= 2022–23 Central Wales Football League =

MMP Central Wales Football League
- Season: 2022–23

For the 2022–23 season, the Mid Wales Football League rebranded to the Central Wales Football League, coinciding with the introduction of a north-south split between its two divisions. It was known as the MMP Central Wales Football League for sponsorship reasons. It operated at the fourth tier of the Welsh football league system.

The North Division was won by Kerry and the South Division was won by Radnor Valley. The league also had a cup, the Central Wales League Challenge Cup, which was won by Llansantffraid Village.

== Changes from previous season ==
Due to a lack of teams from western parts of Mid Wales, the league changed from its east-west split to a north-south split. The league also changed its name from the Mid Wales Football League to the Central Wales Football League. Five teams applied to join the league: Meifod and Trefonen from the Montgomeryshire League, Presteigne St Andrews and Penybont United from the Mid Wales South League, and Llanilar from the Aberystwyth League. All applicants were accepted, and Trewern United joined them in entering the fourth tier for the upcoming season. In July 2022, Trefonen manager Matt Digwood left the club, and they opted to remain in the Montgomeryshire League rather than joining the Central Wales League. Brecon Town also applied to join the league, but both they and Newcastle Emlyn withdrew in pre-season, leaving the South Division with twelve clubs. Penybont United had also been rumoured to withdraw, but the club dismissed the rumours.

Machynlleth also joined the league after resigning from the Ardal Leagues. Churchstoke withdrew from the Central Wales League and were replaced by Berriew, who had also resigned from the Ardal Leagues.

No clubs were relegated from the league in the previous season.

== North Division ==
Kerry were confirmed as North Division champions by the end of April 2023, with a 6–2 win against Tywyn Bryncrug. They did not apply for a licence to join the third-tier Ardal Leagues.

Pos	Team	Pld	W	D	L	GF	GA	GD	Pts	Qualification
1	Kerry (C)	30	25	4	1	102	43	+59	79	
2	Barmouth & Dyffryn United (Note: Barmouth & Dyffryn United were promoted to the Ardal Leagues, but resigned to stay in the Central Wales League North Division instead. This was because they had lost key players and were unable to replace them.)	30	21	3	6	96	36	+60	66	
3	Llansantffraid Village (P)	30	20	0	10	90	46	+44	60	Promoted to Ardal Leagues
4	Abermule	30	19	3	8	80	37	+43	60	
5	Bishops Castle Town	30	18	5	7	61	45	+16	59	
6	Tywyn Bryncrug	30	14	1	15	88	72	+16	43	
7	Waterloo Rovers	30	12	7	11	62	57	+5	43	
8	Montgomery Town	30	11	8	11	66	61	+5	41	
9	Four Crosses	30	11	7	12	52	60	−8	40	
10	Trewern United	30	11	7	12	51	65	−14	40	
11	Carno	30	11	6	13	54	62	−8	39	
12	Forden United	30	9	7	14	69	59	+10	34	
13	Meifod	30	8	5	17	55	68	−13	29	
14	Dyffryn Banw	30	7	5	18	32	56	−24	26	
15	Berriew	30	4	2	24	29	109	−80	14	
16	Llanfyllin Town	30	4	0	26	40	151	−111	12	

Updated to match(es) played on 17 May 2023. Source: FAW Cymru Football app - "MMP Central Wales League North 22/23 Season"
(C) Champions; (P) Promoted

== South Division ==
Radnor Valley were crowned South Division champions in early May 2023. A 4–2 home win against Tregaron Turfs confirmed the title, which was attended by a "bumper crowd".

Pos	Team	Pld	W	D	L	GF	GA	GD	Pts	Qualification
1	Radnor Valley (C, P)	22	19	2	1	106	27	+79	59	Promoted to Ardal Leagues
2	Hay St Marys (P)	22	16	3	3	93	28	+65	51	Promoted to Ardal Leagues
3	Penparcau	22	16	2	4	94	24	+70	50	
4	Machynlleth	22	13	1	8	63	44	+19	40	
5	Aberystwyth University	22	12	3	7	71	42	+29	39	
6	Tregaron Turfs	22	12	3	7	61	37	+24	39	
7	Llanilar	22	10	4	8	75	46	+29	34	
8	Knighton Town	22	11	1	10	73	44	+29	34	
9	Aberaeron	22	6	0	16	32	86	−54	18	
10	Penybont United	22	2	2	18	15	137	−122	8	
11	Talgarth Town	22	1	3	18	18	94	−76	6	
12	Presteigne St Andrews	22	1	2	19	18	110	−92	5	

Updated to match(es) played on 20 May 2023. Source: FAW Cymru Football app - "MMP Central Wales League South 22/23 Season"
(C) Champions; (P) Promoted

== Central Wales League Challenge Cup ==
Sourced to the FAW Cymru Football app unless otherwise stated.

=== First round ===
Matches were played on 7 and 8 October 2022. All other teams had byes to the second round.

Home team	Score	Away team	Ref
Berriew	2–3	Montgomery Town	
Machynlleth	0–3	Tywyn Bryncrug	
Hay St Marys	3–2	Knighton Town	
Penparcau	4–2	Aberystwyth University	
Waterloo Rovers	2–3	Four Crosses	
Trewern United	4–2	Llanfyllin Town	
Radnor Valley	8–0	Talgarth Town	
Penybont United	0–8	Bishops Castle Town	
Kerry	1–2	Llansantffraid Village	
Forden United	5–3	Meifod	
Aberaeron	0–5	Llanilar	
Barmouth & Dyffryn United		Carno	

=== Second round ===
Matches were played on 3 December 2022, except for Barmouth & Dyffryn United vs Abermule which was on 10 December, and Trewern United vs Hay St Marys which was on 28 January 2023.

Home team	Score	Away team	Ref
Tywyn Bryncrug		Presteigne St Andrews	
Tregaron Turfs	3–0	Four Crosses	
Montgomery Town	2–4	Radnor Valley	
Forden United	1–2	Penparcau	
Bishops Castle Town	1–0	Dyffryn Banw	
Llansantffraid Village	4–4 (4–3 p)	Llanilar	
Barmouth & Dyffryn United	2–1	Abermule	
Trewern United	6–1	Hay St Marys	

=== Quarter-finals ===
Matches were played on 25 February 2023.

Home team	Score	Away team	Ref
Barmouth & Dyffryn United	5–1	Trewern United	
Bishops Castle Town	1–4	Llansantffraid Village	
Forden United	2–1	Tregaron Turfs	
Tywyn Bryncrug	1–2	Radnor Valley	

=== Semi-finals ===
Radnor Valley vs Llansantffraid Village was played on 21 March 2023, and Forden United vs Barmouth & Dyffryn United was played on 2 May 2023. Both matches were at neutral grounds.

Home team	Score	Away team	Note	Ref
Forden United	0–5	Barmouth & Dyffryn United	at Machynlleth	
Radnor Valley	0–0 (2–3 p)	Llansantffraid Village	at Llanidloes	

=== Final ===
The final was played on 20 May 2023. Llansantffraid were the first to score, through Matthew Williams. Barmouth equalised in first-half stoppage time, to make the score 1–1 at half-time. The second half had chances for both teams, and a free kick in stoppage time, Williams' second, proved to be the winner for Llansantffraid.

It was played at Caersws's Recreation Ground, which also hosted the Ardal North Cup final between Bow Street and Denbigh Town earlier that day.

20 May 2023

Barmouth & Dyffryn United	1–2	Llansantffraid Village
Jones 45+2'		Williams 37', 90+4'

Caersws Recreation Ground
