= 2010–11 Mid Wales Football League =

SPAR Mid-Wales Football League
- Season: 2010–11

For the 2010–11 Mid Wales Football League, the league was split into two divisions. 15 teams formed Division 1 and 13 teams formed Division 2. Division One began with its first match on 13 August 2010, with the first Division Two match the following day. Both divisions finished on 14 May 2011.

On 9 July 2010, it was announced that Defaid Du had been successful in their application to join the newly formed Division 2, but they withdrew from the league on 10 August, along with Hay St Marys.

== Division 1 ==
SPAR Mid-Wales Football League Division 1
- Champions: Llanrhaeadr
- Promoted: Llanrhaeadr
- Relegated: Presteigne St. Andrews
- Matches played: 210
- Goals scored: 867 (4.13 per match)
- Biggest home win: Bow Street 12–2 Penparcau; 29 March 2011
- Biggest away win: Presteigne St. Andrews 0–9 Berriew; 11 September 2010
- Highest scoring: Bow Street 12–2 Penparcau; 29 March 2011

=== League table ===
Pos	Team	Pld	W	D	L	GF	GA	GD	Pts
1	Llanrhaeadr (C, P)	28	23	1	4	75	23	+52	70
2	Berriew	28	21	5	2	97	29	+68	68
3	Llanidloes Town	28	18	3	7	62	31	+31	57
4	Carno	28	18	3	7	66	37	+29	57
5	Llansantffraid Village	28	15	2	11	64	47	+17	47
6	Tywyn & Bryncrug	28	13	3	12	58	48	+10	42
7	Bow Street	28	11	4	13	66	65	+1	37
8	Aberystwyth University	28	10	4	14	41	53	−12	34
9	Newbridge-on-Wye	28	10	3	15	51	88	−37	33
10	Dolgellau Athletic	28	10	2	16	57	66	−9	32
11	Waterloo Rovers	28	8	8	12	52	61	−9	32
12	Builth Wells	28	9	4	15	41	58	−17	31
13	Penparcau	28	7	6	15	59	87	−28	27
14	Dyffryn Banw	28	5	5	18	39	70	−31	20
15	Presteigne St. Andrews (R)	28	4	3	21	39	104	−65	15

Updated to match(es) played on 14 May 2011. Source: SPAR Mid-Wales Football League
Rules for classification: 1) points; 2) goal difference; 3) number of goals scored.
(C) Champions; (P) Promoted; (R) Relegated

=== Results ===
Home \ Away	ABU	BER	BOW	BUL	CAO	DOL	DYF	LLT	LLH	LLN	NOW	PEN	PSA	T&B	WAT
Aberystwyth University		0–3	0–1	4–1	0–2	3–1	1–1	0–1	2–1	0–1	2–3	5–0	2–1	1–4	1–1
Berriew	6–1		2–2	4–1	2–2	4–0	0–0	2–0	4–1	3–0	7–1	6–2	6–1	1–2	1–0
Bow Street	0–2	0–3		1–0	4–1	2–0	3–2	2–1	1–3	2–4	6–0	12–2	1–1	2–5	2–3
Builth Wells	2–0	0–3	0–0		1–2	3–0	3–4	2–1	1–4	1–0	2–0	4–3	5–1	1–2	2–2
Carno	2–0	1–4	5–1	4–1		3–0	4–2	1–2	0–3	3–1	2–3	2–1	2–0	2–1	3–0
Dolgellau Athletic	2–0	2–2	3–4	1–3	0–3		4–2	2–3	0–4	1–3	5–0	5–1	3–2	3–1	3–4
Dyffryn Banw	2–2	1–2	4–3	1–2	0–4	0–5		3–2	1–4	0–1	6–1	2–3	1–2	0–2	1–0
Llanidloes Town	1–2	2–5	5–0	1–0	1–0	1–0	3–1		0–1	3–0	2–1	3–0	7–1	1–1	2–2
Llanrhaeadr	5–0	2–2	3–1	1–0	3–1	3–0	1–0	1–2		2–0	3–2	4–1	8–0	3–0	2–1
Llansantffraid Village	6–1	2–3	4–3	1–1	0–2	2–0	3–0	2–2	0–2		7–2	3–2	4–2	4–1	6–2
Newbridge-on-Wye	0–6	2–4	2–1	4–2	0–4	4–7	4–1	1–4	1–2	2–1		3–3	2–4	3–1	3–2
Penparcau	1–1	1–5	1–1	6–2	1–1	4–3	1–1	0–2	2–3	1–3	2–2		7–2	2–1	3–2
Presteigne St. Andrews	2–3	0–9	1–7	1–1	2–4	1–2	3–1	0–6	0–4	1–3	0–2	5–2		0–1	3–3
Tywyn & Bryncrug	0–1	1–3	5–0	4–0	1–1	2–3	6–1	1–3	1–0	3–2	1–2	4–3	3–1		2–2
Waterloo Rovers	3–1	2–1	3–4	3–0	3–5	2–2	1–1	0–1	0–2	2–1	1–1	0–4	5–2	3–2	

Updated to match(es) played on 14 May 2011. Source: SPAR Mid-Wales Football League
Legend: Blue = home team win; Yellow = draw; Red = away team win.

== Division 2 ==
SPAR Mid-Wales Football League Division 2
- Champions: Montgomery Town
- Promoted: Montgomery Town
- Matches played: 156
- Goals scored: 628 (4.03 per match)
- Biggest home win: Rhosgoch Rangers 10–0 Talgarth Town; 29 August 2010
- Biggest away win: Meifod 0–7 Llanfair United; 9 October 2010
- Highest scoring: Rhosgoch Rangers 10–0 Talgarth Town; 29 August 2010; Four Crosses 2–8 Montgomery Town; 19 February 2011; Llanfyllin Town 4–6 Rhosgoch Rangers; 14 May 2011

=== League table ===
Pos	Team	Pld	W	D	L	GF	GA	GD	Pts
1	Montgomery Town (C, P)	24	18	5	1	101	23	+78	59
2	Rhosgoch Rangers	24	15	3	6	74	35	+39	48
3	Tregaron Turfs	24	14	4	6	48	42	+6	46
4	Bont	24	10	6	8	47	45	+2	36
5	Kerry	24	10	5	9	43	51	−8	35
6	Llanfair United	24	10	4	10	47	41	+6	34
7	Four Crosses	24	9	7	8	41	50	−9	34
8	Llandrindod Wells	24	8	8	8	48	44	+4	32
9	Aberaeron	24	7	7	10	30	35	−5	28
10	Abermule	24	7	5	12	38	49	−11	26
11	Talgarth Town	24	6	7	11	36	55	−19	25
12	Llanfyllin Town	24	7	3	14	54	76	−22	24
13	Meifod	24	2	2	20	23	82	−59	5 (Note: Meifod deducted three points for failing to fulfil a fixture)

Updated to match(es) played on 14 May 2011. Source: SPAR Mid-Wales Football League
Rules for classification: 1) points; 2) goal difference; 3) number of goals scored.
(C) Champions; (P) Promoted

=== Results ===
Home \ Away	ABE	ABM	BON	FCR	KER	LLW	LLU	LLT	MEI	MON	RHO	TAL	TRT
Aberaeron		2–1	1–1	0–1	2–0	1–2	0–1	2–2	3–1	0–6	1–2	0–0	0–0
Abermule	0–0		0–4	2–3	1–0	2–2	1–0	3–2	6–0	1–1	1–4	3–2	2–4
Bont	2–1	2–1		2–2	2–2	0–0	2–1	2–3	3–1	1–3	2–0	3–1	3–4
Four Crosses	0–1	1–1	3–1		2–2	1–6	1–2	3–1	0–0	2–8	0–1	3–1	2–3
Kerry	1–1	1–1	0–3	1–1		3–2	3–2	5–2	3–2	3–2	1–5	3–2	4–3
Llandrindod Wells	4–4	2–0	1–1	1–1	1–2		1–2	1–4	4–0	1–1	3–2	1–1	0–4
Llanfair United	2–5	4–2	2–2	1–3	3–1	1–3		3–1	6–0	0–0	1–1	3–1	2–0
Llanfyllin Town	0–4	2–1	4–2	4–5	2–3	1–5	5–2		4–2	1–7	4–6	2–2	1–1
Meifod	1–0	1–4	1–2	3–4	4–2	0–4	0–7	2–3		0–5	0–4	0–2	2–3
Montgomery Town	5–1	3–1	5–1	6–0	2–0	5–0	3–1	5–0	6–0		4–4	8–1	6–0
Rhosgoch Rangers	0–1	2–3	5–0	0–1	3–1	3–2	4–0	5–3	2–1	2–2		10–0	5–0
Talgarth Town	2–0	4–0	3–4	2–1	0–1	2–2	0–0	2–1	2–2	1–5	3–0		1–1
Tregaron Turfs	1–0	3–1	1–0	1–1	3–1	3–0	2–1	3–2	3–0	2–3	1–4	2–1	

Updated to match(es) played on 14 May 2011. Source: SPAR Mid-Wales Football League
Legend: Blue = home team win; Yellow = draw; Red = away team win.
