= 2011–12 Mid Wales Football League =

SPAR Mid-Wales Football League
- Season: 2011–12

The 2011–12 Mid Wales Football League began on 13 August 2011. Division 1 ended on 5 May 2012 and Division 2 ended on 13 May 2012.

== Division 1 ==
SPAR Mid-Wales Football League Division 1
- Champions: Rhayader Town
- Promoted: Rhayader Town
- Matches played: 210
- Goals scored: 856 (4.08 per match)
- Biggest home win: Tywyn & Bryncrug 10–0 Welshpool Town; 25 February 2012
- Biggest away win: Waterloo Rovers 0–8 Llanidloes Town; 14 January 2012
- Highest scoring: Rhayader Town 9–2 Welshpool Town; 3 September 2011; Waterloo Rovers 10–1 Welshpool Town; 26 December 2011

=== League table ===
Pos	Team	Pld	W	D	L	GF	GA	GD	Pts
1	Rhayader Town (C, P)	28	21	3	4	84	31	+53	66
2	Montgomery Town	28	21	2	5	97	28	+69	65
3	Newbridge-on-Wye	28	18	6	4	61	37	+24	60
4	Llanidloes Town	28	17	7	4	96	32	+64	58
5	Carno	28	16	4	8	54	33	+21	52
6	Builth Wells	28	15	4	9	64	53	+11	49
7	Berriew	28	11	7	10	54	51	+3	40
8	Tywyn & Bryncrug	28	10	5	13	63	52	+11	35
9	Waterloo Rovers	28	11	2	15	59	63	−4	35
10	Llansantffraid Village	28	9	7	12	47	59	−12	34
11	Bow Street	28	10	4	14	50	71	−21	34
12	Dolgellau Athletic	28	7	3	18	45	80	−35	24
13	Aberystwyth University	28	5	6	17	25	56	−31	21
14	Dyffryn Banw	28	3	6	19	33	91	−58	15
15	Welshpool Town	28	2	2	24	24	119	−95	8

Updated to match(es) played on 5 May 2012. Source: SPAR Mid-Wales Football League
Rules for classification: 1) points; 2) goal difference; 3) number of goals scored.
(C) Champions; (P) Promoted

=== Results ===
Home \ Away	ABU	BER	BOW	BUL	CAO	DOL	DYF	LLT	LLN	MON	NOW	RHA	T&B	WAT	WEL
Aberystwyth University		1–2	0–1	1–3	0–1	2–0	2–2	2–6	3–0	1–2	0–2	1–3	1–1	2–0	2–0
Berriew	2–1		7–1	0–0	1–1	3–3	2–1	1–3	0–1	2–3	0–1	4–4	2–1	2–2	4–0
Bow Street	0–0	1–1		1–3	2–4	2–1	3–3	1–6	2–1	1–6	1–3	0–1	1–2	5–2	4–2
Builth Wells	0–0	2–4	4–1		0–2	4–2	1–0	3–3	2–2	1–0	1–2	2–3	4–3	2–0	4–1
Carno	3–0	1–1	2–1	2–0		3–0	3–1	0–0	1–0	1–2	0–1	0–3	1–2	3–0	4–0
Dolgellau Athletic	3–2	2–1	6–3	0–3	0–2		2–3	0–3	2–3	0–6	2–2	0–2	2–1	1–2	4–2
Dyffryn Banw	1–1	1–2	2–3	2–8	2–4	3–3		0–7	2–2	1–6	0–2	1–4	1–5	0–4	1–1
Llanidloes Town	3–0	2–0	1–1	2–3	1–1	5–1	6–0		6–0	1–1	0–2	4–1	5–4	2–3	4–0
Llansantffraid Village	1–0	3–2	4–1	1–2	3–2	1–3	3–1	2–6		1–2	0–0	0–4	2–2	2–1	1–1
Montgomery Town	7–0	7–1	3–1	8–0	3–0	6–0	6–1	0–2	2–0		2–3	1–3	3–2	2–1	6–0
Newbridge-on-Wye	2–2	3–1	2–5	3–4	1–0	3–1	4–1	3–1	1–1	0–0		1–2	2–1	5–5	5–2
Rhayader Town	4–0	3–0	3–4	1–0	2–3	5–1	5–0	0–0	5–2	1–0	2–0		0–3	5–0	9–2
Tywyn & Bryncrug	4–0	2–4	0–2	3–2	3–2	1–4	0–1	2–2	2–2	2–3	1–2	1–1		0–1	10–0
Waterloo Rovers	3–0	0–2	2–0	5–2	3–4	4–1	0–1	0–8	3–2	2–4	1–2	0–2	2–3		10–1
Welshpool Town	0–1	1–3	0–2	1–4	1–4	3–1	2–1	1–7	1–7	0–6	1–4	1–6	0–2	0–3	

Updated to match(es) played on 5 May 2012. Source: SPAR Mid-Wales Football League
Legend: Blue = home team win; Yellow = draw; Red = away team win.

== Division 2 ==
SPAR Mid-Wales Football League Division 2
- Champions: Aberaeron
- Promoted: Aberaeron; Four Crosses
- Matches played: 240
- Goals scored: 1,129 (4.7 per match)
- Biggest home win: Llandrindod Wells 12–1 Machynlleth; 7 January 2012
- Biggest away win: Rhosgoch Rangers 0–8 Llanfair United; 10 September 2011; Meifod 0–8 Llanfyllin Town; 10 December 2011
- Highest scoring: Bont 3–10 Talgarth Town; 15 October 2011; Aberdyfi 4–9 Tregaron Turfs; 3 December 2011; Llandrindod Wells 12–1 Machynlleth; 7 January 2012

=== League table ===
Pos	Team	Pld	W	D	L	GF	GA	GD	Pts
1	Aberaeron (C, P)	30	24	3	3	97	31	+66	75
2	Four Crosses (P)	30	22	2	6	104	47	+57	68
3	Llanfair United	30	21	4	5	88	28	+60	67
4	Llandrindod Wells	30	20	5	5	95	24	+71	65
5	Rhosgoch Rangers	30	14	5	11	78	53	+25	47
6	Knighton Town	30	14	5	11	68	59	+9	47
7	Llanfyllin Town	30	13	7	10	73	69	+4	46
8	Machynlleth	30	14	4	12	72	80	−8	46
9	Talgarth Town	30	14	3	13	78	79	−1	45
10	Kerry	30	8	9	13	41	65	−24	33
11	Aberdyfi	30	8	6	16	81	90	−9	30
12	Abermule	30	8	5	17	57	91	−34	29
13	Bont	30	7	5	18	53	100	−47	26
14	Tregaron Turfs	30	5	9	16	60	78	−18	24
15	Presteigne St. Andrews	30	5	5	20	53	102	−49	20
16	Meifod	30	2	5	23	31	133	−102	5 (Note: Meifod deducted six points for cancellation of two fixtures.)

Updated to match(es) played on 13 May 2012. Source: SPAR Mid-Wales Football League
Rules for classification: 1) points; 2) goal difference; 3) number of goals scored.
(C) Champions; (P) Promoted

=== Results ===
Home \ Away	ABE	ABY	ABM	BON	FCR	KER	KNI	LLW	LLU	LLT	MAC	MEI	PSA	RHO	TAL	TRT
Aberaeron		2–0	5–0	2–2	5–1	1–1	6–0	1–0	1–0	2–1	3–1	3–2	2–1	2–0	4–2	4–1
Aberdyfi	1–3		5–2	4–0	2–2	2–2	0–1	2–5	2–3	1–3	4–4	6–3	5–1	1–5	6–0	4–9
Abermule	2–4	4–4		4–0	2–3	0–3	0–7	0–2	1–4	3–0	0–3	5–1	3–0	0–6	1–4	3–3
Bont	1–5	4–2	2–3		1–7	6–2	5–1	2–9	2–3	1–5	1–2	2–2	1–0	4–1	3–10	2–2
Four Crosses	1–3	3–6	3–2	3–0		5–0	6–1	2–1	3–0	0–1	9–0	4–0	7–0	3–1	2–0	2–0
Kerry	0–5	2–2	1–1	2–1	0–2		1–2	2–3	0–0	2–3	4–2	1–0	1–3	4–1	1–0	3–1
Knighton Town	1–5	4–2	6–0	7–1	1–4	1–2		1–1	0–1	3–2	1–1	1–1	2–0	3–2	3–2	4–0
Llandrindod Wells	2–0	3–2	2–0	5–0	1–1	6–0	1–0		0–1	8–1	12–1	3–0	5–0	0–0	0–1	1–1
Llanfair United	2–1	5–1	5–1	5–1	1–2	4–0	3–1	1–0		2–0	6–1	6–0	3–2	0–0	6–2	0–0
Llanfyllin Town	2–7	1–7	3–3	2–4	6–3	1–1	1–1	2–2	2–1		4–1	3–0	3–3	3–0	3–2	3–1
Machynlleth	2–0	2–0	0–3	4–1	6–3	3–2	4–2	0–2	1–4	2–1		4–0	4–4	2–3	7–0	3–2
Meifod	1–7	5–2	0–3	2–2	3–8	2–2	0–4	0–6	1–5	0–8	0–5		2–2	0–6	0–6	4–3
Presteigne St. Andrews	1–5	3–4	1–1	1–3	2–4	2–0	3–4	2–6	0–7	3–3	2–4	7–0		2–3	1–6	2–1
Rhosgoch Rangers	1–3	5–1	7–2	3–0	1–3	1–1	3–1	0–2	0–8	2–2	3–1	5–0	0–2		7–0	4–1
Talgarth Town	1–5	3–2	5–4	2–1	1–3	4–0	1–4	1–5	1–1	3–2	0–0	4–1	6–0	2–2		6–3
Tregaron Turfs	1–1	1–1	2–4	0–0	0–5	1–1	1–1	0–2	2–1	1–2	4–2	10–1	7–3	0–6	2–3	

Updated to match(es) played on 13 May 2012. Source: SPAR Mid-Wales Football League
Legend: Blue = home team win; Yellow = draw; Red = away team win.
