= 2011–12 Cymru Alliance =

Huws Gray Alliance
- Season: 2011–12
- Champions: Gap Connah's Quay
- Relegated: Llangefni Town; Llanrhaeadr; Rhos Aelwyd
- Matches: 240
- Goals: 858 (3.58 per match)
- Biggest home win: Connah's Quay 9–1 Penycae 20 August 2011; Rhyl 8–0 Penycae 20 August 2011; Connah's Quay 8–0 Llanrhaeadr 16 September 2011
- Biggest away win: Caersws 1–8 Rhyl; 27 August 2011
- Highest scoring: Connah's Quay 9–1 Penycae 20 August 2011; Caersws 8–2 Llangefni Town 8 October 2011

The 2011–12 Cymru Alliance season, also known as Huws Gray Alliance for sponsoring purposes, is the 22nd season of the Cymru Alliance, the second-level association football league in north Wales. It began on 12 August 2011 and ended on 21 April 2012. Sixteen teams take part in the league, with Gap Connah's Quay being the defending champions.

The champions are eligible for promotion to the 2012–13 Welsh Premier League, pending a licence application and approval, while the bottom three teams will be relegated to one of the three feeder leagues of the Cymru Alliance.

== Teams ==
No team was either promoted to or relegated from the 2010–11 Welsh Premier League after 2010–11 Cymru Alliance champions Gap Connah's Quay were denied a 2011–12 Premier League licence, with Bala Town therefore being spared of relegation from the highest Welsh league.

Rhydymwyn, Rhayader Town and Welshpool Town were relegated at the end of the 2010–11 season after finishing in the bottom three places of the table. They were replaced by the 2010–11 champions of the three Cymru Alliance feeder leagues, Conwy United (Welsh Alliance League), Llanrhaeadr (Mid Wales League) and Penycae (Welsh National League).

Locations of the 2011–12 Cymru Alliance clubs

| Club | Location | Ground | 2010–11 position |
|---|---|---|---|
| Buckley Town | Buckley | Globe Way Stadium | 9th |
| Caersws | Caersws | Recreation Ground | 5th |
| Cefn Druids | Cefn Mawr | The Rock | 3rd |
| Conwy United | Conwy | | WAL, 1st |
| Flint Town United | Flint | Cae-y-Castell | 7th |
| Gap Connah's Quay | Connah's Quay | Deeside Stadium | 1st |
| Guilsfield | Guilsfield | Guilsfield Community Centre | 13th |
| Llandudno | Llandudno | Maesdu Park | 6th |
| Llangefni Town | Llangefni | Bob Parry Field | 10th |
| Llanrhaeadr | Llanrhaeadr-ym-Mochnant | | MWL, 1st |
| Penrhyncoch | Penrhyn-coch | Cae Barker | 11th |
| Penycae | Penycae | | WNL, 1st |
| Porthmadog | Porthmadog | Y Traeth | 8th |
| Rhos Aelwyd | Ponciau | Ponciau Park | 4th |
| Rhyl | Rhyl | Belle Vue | 2nd |
| Ruthin Town | Ruthin | Memorial Playing Fields | 12th |

== League table ==
| Pos | Team | Pld | W | D | L | GF | GA | GD | Pts | Promotion or relegation |
|---|---|---|---|---|---|---|---|---|---|---|
| 1 | Connah's Quay Nomads (C) | 30 | 21 | 5 | 4 | 89 | 23 | +66 | 68 | Promotion to Welsh Premier League (Note: Promotion to the Premier League is subject to a licence application and approval process. If the champions do not apply for a Premier League licence or are declined of the same, the runners-up may be promoted instead.) |
| 2 | Rhyl | 30 | 19 | 5 | 6 | 80 | 22 | +58 | 62 | |
| 3 | Buckley Town | 30 | 19 | 4 | 7 | 67 | 43 | +24 | 61 | |
| 4 | Porthmadog (Note: Caersws & Porthmadog deducted three points for fielding an ineligible player.) | 30 | 19 | 5 | 6 | 68 | 41 | +27 | 59 | |
| 5 | Penrhyncoch | 30 | 17 | 4 | 9 | 56 | 44 | +12 | 55 | |
| 6 | Cefn Druids | 30 | 17 | 3 | 10 | 58 | 42 | +16 | 54 | Qualification for Europa League first qualifying round |
| 7 | Caersws | 30 | 17 | 4 | 9 | 68 | 49 | +19 | 52 | |
| 8 | Llandudno | 30 | 14 | 7 | 9 | 55 | 40 | +15 | 49 | |
| 9 | Flint Town United | 30 | 13 | 7 | 10 | 59 | 47 | +12 | 46 | |
| 10 | Conwy United | 30 | 10 | 7 | 13 | 59 | 65 | −6 | 37 | |
| 11 | Guilsfield | 30 | 10 | 4 | 16 | 41 | 58 | −17 | 34 | |
| 12 | Ruthin Town | 30 | 6 | 7 | 17 | 28 | 60 | −32 | 25 | |
| 13 | Penycae | 30 | 7 | 4 | 19 | 30 | 76 | −46 | 25 | |
| 14 | Llanrhaeadr (R) | 30 | 3 | 9 | 18 | 40 | 77 | −37 | 18 | Relegation to Welsh Level 3 |
| 15 | Llangefni Town (R) | 30 | 4 | 2 | 24 | 32 | 96 | −64 | 14 | Relegation to Welsh Level 3 |
| 16 | Rhos Aelwyd (R) | 30 | 2 | 7 | 21 | 29 | 76 | −47 | 13 | Relegation to Welsh Level 3 |

Source: Soccerway
Rules for classification: 1) points; 2) goal difference; 3) number of goals scored.
(C) Champions; (R) Relegated

== Results ==
| Home \ Away | BUC | CSW | CDR | CON | FTU | CQN | GUI | LND | LGT | LLH | PRC | PYC | POR | RHO | RHL | RUT |
|---|---|---|---|---|---|---|---|---|---|---|---|---|---|---|---|---|
| Buckley Town | | 0–2 | 4–1 | 1–3 | 1–0 | 1–1 | 7–0 | 2–2 | 4–1 | 3–2 | 2–1 | 3–1 | 1–0 | 1–0 | 2–3 | 1–0 |
| Caersws | 3–4 | | 2–1 | 3–2 | 0–1 | 1–6 | 5–0 | 1–3 | 8–2 | 3–1 | 1–1 | 3–2 | 2–3 | 4–1 | 1–8 | 1–0 |
| Cefn Druids | 0–1 | 1–2 | | 4–2 | 4–4 | 1–2 | 4–2 | 1–3 | 6–1 | 5–1 | 3–2 | 1–2 | 2–1 | 2–0 | 1–0 | 4–1 |
| Conwy United | 0–2 | 1–3 | 0–1 | | 1–2 | 2–2 | 2–1 | 0–4 | 4–0 | 6–1 | 3–3 | 1–1 | 0–2 | 4–4 | 0–5 | 6–2 |
| Flint Town United | 1–1 | 2–1 | 1–2 | 2–2 | | 1–2 | 2–1 | 3–1 | 3–0 | 2–0 | 1–3 | 3–1 | 0–1 | 1–1 | 1–1 | 0–2 |
| Connah's Quay Nomads | 6–1 | 1–0 | 2–0 | 1–1 | 0–3 | | 5–0 | 4–0 | 4–0 | 8–0 | 2–0 | 9–1 | 1–1 | 6–0 | 2–1 | 6–0 |
| Guilsfield | 3–0 | 1–0 | 1–2 | 1–2 | 2–2 | 3–1 | | 2–2 | 0–3 | 1–1 | 1–3 | 0–2 | 2–3 | 4–1 | 1–1 | 3–0 |
| Llandudno | 1–3 | 1–2 | 2–0 | 4–2 | 2–3 | 0–1 | 3–2 | | 5–2 | 1–0 | 3–2 | 2–1 | 1–2 | 3–1 | 1–0 | 1–1 |
| Llangefni Town | 0–4 | 0–2 | 1–2 | 1–3 | 1–6 | 0–3 | 0–1 | 0–6 | | 2–2 | 4–2 | 0–1 | 1–5 | 3–0 | 0–1 | 0–2 |
| Llanrhaeadr | 2–4 | 0–4 | 1–2 | 1–1 | 4–3 | 2–2 | 0–2 | 1–1 | 1–3 | | 1–1 | 2–3 | 3–3 | 3–0 | 1–2 | 0–1 |
| Penrhyncoch | 2–0 | 1–4 | 1–0 | 2–0 | 1–0 | 0–3 | 2–0 | 1–0 | 3–2 | 3–1 | | 1–0 | 1–3 | 1–0 | 1–1 | 4–1 |
| Penycae | 0–1 | 2–2 | 0–2 | 0–4 | 2–4 | 0–4 | 1–3 | 1–0 | 2–0 | 1–1 | 0–6 | | 1–2 | 2–1 | 0–2 | 1–1 |
| Porthmadog | 2–6 | 1–2 | 1–1 | 2–4 | 2–1 | 2–0 | 2–1 | 2–2 | 6–2 | 2–1 | 2–3 | 4–0 | | 4–1 | 2–0 | 2–1 |
| Rhos Aelwyd | 2–4 | 0–3 | 0–2 | 1–2 | 2–2 | 1–2 | 0–2 | 0–0 | 1–1 | 2–2 | 2–3 | 4–2 | 1–4 | | 2–6 | 1–0 |
| Rhyl | 2–1 | 1–1 | 1–2 | 6–0 | 6–0 | 1–0 | 2–0 | 0–1 | 6–1 | 4–0 | 4–0 | 8–0 | 0–0 | 3–0 | | 2–0 |
| Ruthin Town | 2–2 | 2–2 | 1–1 | 3–1 | 0–5 | 0–3 | 0–1 | 0–0 | 3–1 | 2–5 | 0–2 | 2–0 | 0–2 | 0–0 | 1–3 | |

Source: Soccerway
Legend: Blue = home team win; Yellow = draw; Red = away team win.
