= 2012–13 Cymru Alliance =

Huws Gray Alliance
- Season: 2012–13
- Matches played: 240

The 2012–13 Cymru Alliance season is the 23rd season of the Cymru Alliance, the second-level association football league in north Wales.

The champions were eligible for promotion to the 2013–14 Welsh Premier League, pending a licence application and approval, while the bottom three teams were relegated to one of the three feeder leagues of the Cymru Alliance.

== Teams ==
Locations of the 2012–13 Cymru Alliance clubs

| Club | Location | Ground | 2010-11 position |
|---|---|---|---|
| Buckley Town | Buckley | Globe Way Stadium | 3rd |
| Caersws | Caersws | Recreation Ground | 7th |
| Cefn Druids | Cefn Mawr | The Rock | 6th |
| Conwy Borough | Conwy | | 10th |
| Flint Town United | Flint | Cae-y-Castell | 9th |
| Gap Connah's Quay | Connah's Quay | Deeside Stadium | 1st |
| Guilsfield | Guilsfield | Guilsfield Community Centre | 11th |
| Holyhead Hotspur | Holyhead | Bob Parry Field | WAL, 1st |
| Llandudno | Llandudno | Maesdu Park | 8th |
| Llanrhaeadr | Llanrhaeadr-ym-Mochnant | | [14th |
| Penrhyncoch | Penrhyn-coch | Cae Barker | 5th |
| Penycae | Penycae | | 13th |
| Porthmadog | Porthmadog | Y Traeth | 4th |
| Rhayader Town | Rhayader | Y Weirglodd | MWL, 1st |
| Rhyl | Rhyl | Belle Vue | 2nd |
| Ruthin Town | Ruthin | Memorial Playing Fields | 12th |

== League table ==
| Pos | Team | Pld | W | D | L | GF | GA | GD | Pts | Promotion or relegation |
|---|---|---|---|---|---|---|---|---|---|---|
| 1 | Rhyl (C, P) | 30 | 24 | 6 | 0 | 100 | 24 | +76 | 78 | Promotion to Welsh Premier League |
| 2 | Cefn Druids A.F.C. | 30 | 22 | 3 | 5 | 79 | 32 | +47 | 69 | |
| 3 | Conwy Borough F.C. | 30 | 18 | 7 | 5 | 57 | 37 | +20 | 61 | |
| 4 | Caersws F.C. | 30 | 18 | 3 | 9 | 90 | 42 | +48 | 57 | |
| 5 | Buckley Town F.C. | 30 | 13 | 10 | 7 | 60 | 35 | +25 | 49 | |
| 6 | Flint Town United | 30 | 14 | 6 | 10 | 61 | 51 | +10 | 48 | |
| 7 | Holyhead Hotspur | 30 | 13 | 4 | 13 | 51 | 55 | −4 | 43 | |
| 8 | Guilsfield F.C. | 30 | 12 | 6 | 12 | 60 | 54 | +6 | 42 | |
| 9 | Porthmadog | 30 | 11 | 5 | 14 | 48 | 52 | −4 | 38 | |
| 10 | Penrhyncoch F.C. | 30 | 9 | 7 | 14 | 50 | 63 | −13 | 34 | |
| 11 | Rhayader Town F.C. | 30 | 9 | 6 | 15 | 44 | 66 | −22 | 33 | |
| 12 | Llandudno F.C. | 30 | 8 | 8 | 14 | 36 | 58 | −22 | 32 | |
| 13 | Penycae F.C. | 30 | 7 | 5 | 18 | 49 | 84 | −35 | 26 | |
| 14 | Rhydymwyn F.C. (R) | 30 | 6 | 8 | 16 | 49 | 96 | −47 | 26 | Relegation to Welsh Level 3 |
| 15 | Llanrhaeadr F.C. (R) | 30 | 4 | 7 | 19 | 29 | 87 | −58 | 19 | Relegation to Welsh Level 3 |
| 16 | Ruthin Town F.C. (R) | 30 | 3 | 7 | 20 | 47 | 74 | −27 | 16 | Relegation to Welsh Level 3 |

Source: http://www.soccervista.com/Wales-Cymru_Alliance-2012_2013-827816.html
(C) Champions; (P) Promoted; (R) Relegated
