= 1991–92 Cymru Alliance =

Cymru Alliance
- Season: 1991–92
- Champions: Caersws

The 1991–92 Cymru Alliance was the second season of the Cymru Alliance after its establishment in 1990. The league was won by Caersws. This season also saw the league extended to 16 teams.

== League table ==
Pos	Team	Pld	W	D	L	GF	GA	GD	Pts	Promotion
1	Caersws (C, P)	30	15	10	5	65	27	+38	55	Promotion to League of Wales
2	Llansantffraid	30	15	8	7	58	34	+24	53	
3	CPD Porthmadog (P)	30	14	10	6	63	43	+20	52	Promotion to League of Wales
4	Flint Town United (P)	30	14	9	7	58	37	+21	51	Promotion to League of Wales
5	Conwy United (P)	30	15	5	10	62	45	+17	50	Promotion to League of Wales
6	Connah's Quay Nomads (P)	30	11	12	7	41	33	+8	45	Promotion to League of Wales
7	Mostyn Town	30	13	6	11	52	56	−4	45	
8	Lex XI	30	11	10	9	44	52	−8	43	
9	Penrhyncoch	30	11	7	12	53	51	+2	40	
10	Mold Alexandra (Note: Mold Alexandra deducted 3 points) (P)	30	12	3	15	40	47	−7	36	Promotion to League of Wales
11	Holywell Town (P)	30	7	10	13	48	49	−1	31	Promotion to League of Wales
12	Llanidloes Town (P)	30	8	7	15	37	57	−20	31	Promotion to League of Wales
13	Gresford Athletic	30	8	6	16	34	55	−21	30	
14	Carno	30	5	2	23	28	69	−41	17	
15	Brymbo	30	4	2	24	29	108	−79	14	
16	Welshpool Town (Note: Welshpool Town deducted 66 points)	30	20	7	3	74	23	+51	1	

Source: NonLeagueMatters
Rules for classification: 1) points; 2) goal difference; 3) number of goals scored.
(C) Champions; (P) Promoted
