= Montgomeryshire Football League =

- Founded: 1904
- Country: Wales
- Other club from: England (3 teams)
- Divisions: 1
- Number of clubs: 16
- Level on pyramid: 5
- Feeder to: Central Wales Football League
- Promotion to: Central Wales Football League
- Current champions: Trefonen (2025–26)
- Most championships: Llanfair United/ Llanfair Caereinion (10 titles)

The Montgomeryshire Football League (currently the Constructiv Clothing Montgomeryshire Amateur Football League for sponsorship reasons) is a football league in Mid Wales, sitting at the fifth level of the Welsh football league system.

The league hosts several cup competitions. These include: The Emrys Morgan Cup, Montgomeryshire Cup, Village Cup, Tanners Town Cup, League Cup and Consolation Cup.

Teams promoted from Division One may enter the Central Wales Football League if standards and facilities fall into line with the regulations and criteria of the FAW and Central Wales League (Tier 4 of the Welsh Football Pyramid).

== History ==
The league was founded in 1904 as the Montgomeryshire & District League, and the first ten seasons before the First World War saw the league dominated by Aberystwyth Town, who won the inaugural title and two other championships, and Llanidloes who won five titles.

After the war, the league was reformed for a single season with Newtown picking up their only title (to date), before the league went into abeyance with the creation of the Welsh National League setup. The league returned in the 1930s as the Montgomeryshire Junior League and ran until the outbreak of the Second World War, when football was again suspended.

The 1950s were notable for five successive titles for Rodney Rovers, a club from Four Crosses, who played behind the Golden Lion public house.

The 1967–68 saw the league expand to two divisions, a format that continued until the 2021–22 season.

It has also been known as the Montgomeryshire Amateur League.

== Member clubs for 2026–27 season ==
- AFC Morda United
- Berriew (development)
- Dyffryn Banw
- Felindre
- Forden United (reserves)
- Four Crosses
- Llanfair United (reserves)
- Llanfechain
- Llangedwyn
- Llanrhaeadr (reserves)
- Llansantffraid Village (development)
- Meifod
- Newcastle
- Trefonen
- Waterloo Rovers (reserves)
- Welshpool Town (reserves)

== Champions ==
=== One division structure ===
Season	Division One
2025–26	Trefonen
2024–25	Kerry reserves
2023-24	Llangedwyn
2022-23	Llangedwyn
2021-22	Meifod

=== Two division structure ===
Season	Division One	Division Two
2020-21	Season cancelled - Covid-19 pandemic	
2019-20	Guilsfield reserves	Newtown Wanderers
2018-19	Guilsfield reserves	Llanrhaeadr reserves
2017-18	Bishops Castle Town	Forden United
2016-17	Waterloo Rovers	Bishops Castle Town
2015-16	Llanfair United reserves	Forden United
2014-15	Bettws (Cedewain)	Morda United
2013-14	Llanfair United reserves	Bettws (Cedewain)
2012-13	Caersws reserves	Llandrinio
2011-12	Caersws	Llanfair United reserves
2010-11	Llanidloes Town reserves	Welshpool Town reserves
2009-10	Llanidloes Town	Trefonen
2008-09	Llansantffraid Village	Welshpool Town reserves
2007-08	Dyffryn Banw	Llansantffraid Village
2006-07	Bishop's Castle Town	The New Saints Colts
2005-06	Total Network Solutions reserves	Waterloo Rovers reserves
2004-05	Four Crosses	Llanfyllin Town reserves
2003-04	Welshpool Town reserves	Four Crosses
2002-03	Llangedwyn	Welshpool Town reserves
2001-02	Bettws (Cedewain)	Forden United
2000-01	Llanfyllin Town	Berriew
1999-00	Llangedwyn	Kerry reserves
1998-99	Waterloo Rovers	Llanwddyn
1997-98	Meifod	Forden United
1996-97	Waterloo Rovers	Welshpool Town reserves
1995-96	Kerry	Llanrhaeadr
1994-95	Guilsfield	Llanfyllin Town
1993-94	Mochdre	Newtown Rangers
1992-93	Llansantffraid reserves	Mochdre
1991-92	Llansantffraid reserves	Meifod
1990-91	Berriew	Llanymynech Rovers
1989-90	Llanfair Caereinion	Waterloo Rovers
1988-89	Llanfair Caereinion	Llanfechain
1987-88	Berriew	Guilsfield
1986-87	Llansantffraid	Llangedwyn
1985-86	Llanfair Caereinion	Carno
1984-85	Llanfair Caereinion	Llanrhaeadr
1983-84	Bettws (Cedewain)	Forden United
1982-83	Llansantffraid	R & Q Sports
1981-82	Welshpool Rangers	Berriew
1980-81	Llanfyllin Town	Llansantffraid
1979-80	Llanfechain	Carno
1978–79	Llanfyllin Town	Llanfair United reserves
1977-78	Caersws reserves	Carno
1976–77	Llanfyllin Town	Caersws reserves
1975-76	Montgomery Town	Carno
1974–75	Llanfair United	Newtown Amateurs
1973–74	Llanfyllin Town	Montgomery Town
1972–73	Llanfair United	Llanfyllin Town
1971-72	Llanwddyn	Abermule
1970–71	Llansantffraid	Welshpool Amateur reserves
1969–70	Llansantffraid	Llanwddyn

=== One division structure ===
Those years empty are not known.

- 1968–69: – Llansantffraid
- 1967–68: – Welshpool Amateurs
- 1966–67: – Carno
- 1965–66: – Llanrhaeadr
- 1964–65: – Forden United
- 1963–64: – Newtown Amateurs
- 1962–63: – Forden United
- 1961–62: – Trewern United
- 1960–61: – Berriew
- 1959–60: – Montgomery Town
- 1958–59: – Montgomery Town
- 1957–58: – Rodney Rovers
- 1956–57: – Rodney Rovers
- 1955–56: – Rodney Rovers
- 1954–55: – Rodney Rovers
- 1953–54: – Rodney Rovers
- 1952–53: – Montgomery Town
- 1951–52: – Llanfechain
- 1950–51: – Llanfechain
- 1949–50: – Llandrinio
- 1948–49: – Llandrinio
- 1947–48: – Llanfair United
- 1946–47: – Llanfair United
- 1945–46: – Football suspended - World War Two
- 1944–45: – Football suspended - World War Two
- 1943–44: – Football suspended - World War Two
- 1942–43: – Football suspended - World War Two
- 1941–42: – Football suspended - World War Two
- 1940–41: – Football suspended - World War Two
- 1939–40: – Football suspended - World War Two
- 1938–39: – Caersws
- 1937–38: – Caersws
- 1936–37: – Guilsfield
- 1935–36: –
- 1934–35: – Newtown C C
- 1920–21: – League went into abeyance with the creation of the Welsh National League setup (started again in 1930s, but unclear which season)
- 1919–20: – Newtown
- 1918–19: – Football suspended - World War One
- 1917–18: – Football suspended - World War One
- 1916–17: – Football suspended - World War One
- 1915–16: – Football suspended - World War One
- 1914–15: – Football suspended - World War One
- 1913–14: – Llanidloes
- 1912–13: – Llanidloes
- 1911–12: – Llanidloes
- 1910–11: – Llanfyllin
- 1909–10: – Llanidloes
- 1908–09: – Llanidloes
- 1907–08: – Aberystwyth Town
- 1906–07: – Aberystwyth Town
- 1905–06: – Newtown North End
- 1904–05: – Aberystwyth Town

=== Titles by team ===
- Llanfair United/ Llanfair Caereinion/ reserves – 10 titles
- Llansantffraid/ TNS / reserves – 8 titles
- Llanidloes – 6 titles
- Llanfyllin – 5 titles
- Rodney Rovers – 5 titles
- Caersws/ Caersws reserves – 4 titles
- Llangedwyn – 4 titles
- Montgomery Town – 4 titles
- Aberystwyth Town – 3 titles
- Berriew – 3 titles
- Bettws (Cedewain) – 3 titles
- Guilsfield/ Guilsfield reserves – 3 titles
- Llanfechain – 3 titles
- Waterloo Rovers – 3 titles
- Bishop's Castle Town – 2 titles
- Forden United – 2 titles
- Kerry/ Kerry reserves – 2 titles
- Llandrinio – 2 titles
- Meifod – 2 titles
- Carno – 1 title
- Dyffryn Banw – 1 title
- Four Crosses – 1 title
- Llansantffraid Village – 1 title
- Llanrhaeadr – 1 title
- Llanwddyn – 1 title
- Mochdre – 1 title
- Newtown - 1 title
- Newtown Amateurs – 1 title
- Newtown C C – 1 title
- Newtown North End – 1 title
- Trefonen – 1 title
- Trewern United – 1 title
- Welshpool Amateurs – 1 title
- Welshpool Rangers – 1 title
- Welshpool Town reserves – 1 title

== See also ==
- Football in Wales
- List of football clubs in Wales
