= Trewern United F.C. =

Football club based in Powys

Trewern United
- Full name: Trewern United Football Club
- Nickname: The Tigers
- Founded: 1954; 2007; 2016
- Dissolved: 2005; 2010
- Ground: Llandrinio Village Hall Field
- League: Central Wales Northern Division
- 2024–25: Central Wales Northern Division, 11th of 15
Home colours	Away colours

Trewern United Football Club is a Welsh football club based in Trewern, Powys. The team last played in the Central Wales Northern Division, before they withdrew from the league in December 2025.

== History ==
The original Trewern United club was founded in 1954. In that year a Trewern United team entered the Welsh Youth Cup, and were scheduled to play Rodney Rovers.

Trewern United were Montgomeryshire League champions in 1961–62. In 1964, they were accused of "throwing" a match, after a 10–1 loss to Newtown Amateurs on 14 March. The club dismissed the accusation as "ridiculous". In February 1965, five Trewern players were warned by the Football Association of Wales for leaving the field without permission, in a game away at Carno on 12 December 1964.

In the 1992–93 season, they were runners-up in the Montgomeryshire League Division Two, and were promoted to Division One. A 4–1 loss to Mochdre late in the season confirmed it was Mochdre who were champions. The club remained active in the Montgomeryshire League until folding in 2005. For the 2007–08 season Trewern United reformed and were again members of the Montgomeryshire League. This club folded in 2010.

In January 2016 it was announced that Trewern Football Club would reform and rejoin the Montgomeryshire League. The club had secured the use of the pitch and changing facilities at Buttington Trewern School. This was confirmed at the league's annual general meeting in June, with the club using the name Trewern United, like the village's the previous clubs. Their first match was in July, in a friendly against a team of players from the previous Trewern United. It finished 3–3 and the team of former players won after a penalty shootout. The club competed in the Welsh Cup in both of its first two seasons (2016–17 and 2017–18), but lost in the first qualifying round both times.

In May 2019, Trewern won 4–0 against Abermule reserves to reach the final of the Consolation Cup. Later that month, they played Kerry reserves in the final, and a 115th minute winner from Matt Windsor secured Trewern's first silverware since reforming.

In the 2021–22 season, they were winners of the Boys and Boden Montgomeryshire League Cup, and runners-up in the Llansantffraid Village Cup. After the season they joined the Central Wales Football League's newly formed Northern Division. This was their first time ever playing in the Central Wales League.

In 2025, Trewern were runners-up in the J. Emrys Morgan Cup, losing to Barmouth & Dyffryn United after a penalty shoot-out. In December 2025, the club withdrew from the Central Wales League, with plans to reform in the Montgomeryshire League for the 2026–27 season.

== Ground ==
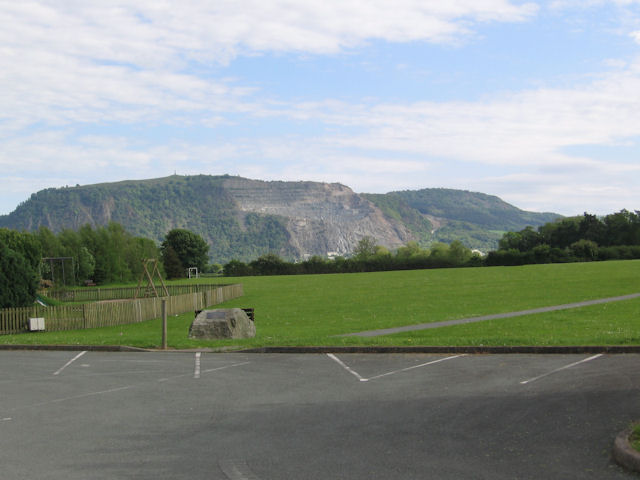
Playing fields at Llandrinio Village Hall

Around the 1960s the club invested in basic ground improvements. In 1961, standing cover was built for spectators, opened ahead of a match against Llansantffraid. The cover has since been demolished.

When the club was reformed in 2016, they played at Buttington Trewern School. In 2022, the club moved to Llandrinio Village Hall Field, coinciding with the club's promotion to tier four.

== Honours ==
- Montgomeryshire Football League – Champions: 1961–62
- Montgomeryshire Football League Division Two – Runners-up: 1992–93
- J. Emrys Morgan Cup – Runners-up: 2024–25
- Boys and Boden Montgomeryshire League Cup – Winners: 2021–22
- Consolation Cup – Winners: 2018–19
- Llansantffraid Village Cup – Runners-up: 2021–22
