= Kerry F.C. =

Kerry Football Club may refer to two unrelated association football clubs:

- Kerry F.C. (Ireland), founded in 2022 and based in Tralee, County Kerry
- Kerry F.C. (Wales), founded in 1876 and based in Kerry, Powys
