= Churchstoke F.C. =

Association football club in Wales

Churchstoke
- Full name: Churchstoke Football Club
- Nickname: The Marketmen
- Founded: 1920
- Dissolved: 2024
- Ground: Cae Camlad
- 2023–24: Montgomeryshire League, (withdrew from league)
Home colours

Churchstoke Football Club was a Welsh football team based in Churchstoke, a village in Montgomeryshire, Powys, Wales. They last played in the Montgomeryshire League, and withdrew from the league in February 2024.

== History ==
The club was originally formed in 1920. They probably first played on a pitch at Wernddu, and later in the 1920s they moved to Cae Gwyn Field. They played in the Montgomeryshire League until moving to the South Shropshire League in 1938.

After World War II, the club resumed with a brief spell in the Montgomeryshire League, before probably moving back to Shropshire football. They returned to the Montgomeryshire League in 1958, using a pitch at Wernddu as they had in the 1920s, and changing facilities at Court House Farm.

In 1966, they left the Montgomeryshire League again to join the South Shropshire League. They had some success in cups, winning the Bucknell Charity Cup in 1966–67, and a double of the League Cup and Consolation Cup in the following season, before folding in 1969.

In 1984, Churchstoke joined the Newtown Sunday League. From 1991 to 1994 a team also competed in the Montgomeryshire League Division Two, without much success.

From the 1996–97 season, they won three of the next four titles in the Newtown Sunday League, as well as many cups. Membership began to decline in the Sunday league, so the club joined the Montgomeryshire League Division Two in 2000. In 2010 they were promoted to Division One after finishing 5th in the league, after a late decision due to Newtown reserves and Bishops Castle Town both leaving the league. Their promotion was confirmed in August. However, in 2012 they were relegated back to Division Two.

They joined the Mid Wales Football League Division Two for the 2014–15 season, after finishing runners-up in the Montgomeryshire League Division Two in the previous season. In the 2016–17 season the team finished as runners-up, gaining promotion to Division One, as well as reaching the final of the ER Jenkins Cup, which they lost 3–1 to Aberystwyth University. After finishing third from the bottom of the table in 2017–18, the following season they finished bottom of the table and were relegated back to Division Two. In their only season there before a restructure of the Welsh football league system, they finished 11th out of 14 teams.

In July 2020 the club was announced as one of the new tier four clubs in the restructured East Division of the Mid Wales Football League. The first season was cancelled due to the COVID-19 pandemic, and in the next season they finished 11th of 13 teams. The club had planned to play in the Central Wales League Northern Division for the 2022–23 season but withdrew from the league prior to the season starting. They subsequently joined the tier five Montgomeryshire League for the 2022–23 season.

In February 2024, the club was unable to recruit a manager and also had a shortage of players. As a result, the club withdrew from the Montgomeryshire League and folded.

== Honours ==
- Mid Wales Football League Division Two - Runners-up: 2016–17
- Montgomeryshire League Division Two - Runners-up: 2013–14
- ER Jenkins Cup - Runners-up: 2016–17
- Bucknell Charity Cup - Winners: 1966–67
- South Shropshire League Cup - Winners: 1967–68
- South Shropshire Consolation Cup - Winners: 1967–68
