= Trefonen F.C. =

Association football club in England

Trefonen
- Full name: Trefonen Football Club
- Nicknames: The Trees, The Pitmen
- Founded: 2008; 18 years ago
- Ground: The Pit Mount (Trefonen)
- League: Montgomeryshire League
- 2024–25: Montgomeryshire League, 6th of 13
Home colours	Away colours

Trefonen F.C. is a football team situated in the village of Trefonen, Shropshire, who play in the Montgomeryshire League.

== History ==
Trefonen had a team playing in the 1883–84 Welsh Cup, they got knocked out by Oswestry White Stars in the second round (Oswestry White Stars won the cup). They were knocked out in the first round of the same cup by Shrewsbury Castle Blues in 1885–86.

In 1981, Trefonen started up another team playing Sunday league in the Wem District Sunday League. Trefonen were a successful team in this league, winning a few trophies, but in 1996 the team folded due to a lack of interest.

In June 2008 the current club formed, aiming to play in the Montgomeryshire League Division Two. After a few months of hard work and time, spent on the pitch, the team played their first game on 16 August 2008, losing 2–1 to Llanfechain. On Saturday, 11 October 2008 the team played its first home game, against Defaid Du FC in the Llansantffraid Village Cup round 1. They lost this game 7–0. Their first win came against Llanidloes Town reserves in a 4–2 score line.

In 2009–10 season the team won the Montgomeryshire League Division Two title, but were not promoted.

On 8 September 2012, Trefonen played their first match on their new pitch, in a 2–1 win against Guilsfield reserves.

== Ground ==
The current team play their games on the local public playing field, known locally as the Pit, because of the old mine situated not far from the pitch.

== Honours ==
Montgomeryshire Amateur Football League

- Champions: 2025–26
- Runners-up: 2021–22
- Division Two Champions: 2009–10
- Division Two Runners-up: 2011–12, 2018–19

Llansantffraid Village Cup

- Champions: 2023–24, 2024–25, 2025–26
- Runners-up: 2009–10, 2022–23

Derek Mills Cup

- Runners-up: 2011–12

Mid Wales Trophies Consolation Cup

- Champions: 2017–18

Bernie Jones Memorial Cup

- Champions: 2021–22, 2022–23

Montgomeryshire Amateur League Cup

- Champions: 2022–23, 2025–26

== See also ==
- Shropshire#Football
