= Trewern (disambiguation) =

Trewern is a village in Montgomeryshire, Wales.

Trewern may also refer to:

- Trewern, Radnorshire, a village in Radnorshire, Wales
- Trewern and Gwaethla, a former community in Radnorshire, Wales
- Trewern Hall or Trewern Farmhouse, a country house in Montgomeryshire, Wales
- Trewern House, one of the Grade II* listed buildings in Powys, Wales
- Trewern Mansion, in the village Llanddewi Velfrey, Pembrokeshire, Wales
- Trewern United F.C., a football club based in Montgomeryshire, Wales

== See also ==
- E. P. Trewern (1895-1959), architect
- Trewen, a hamlet and a civil parish in east Cornwall, England
