= Llanwddyn F.C. =

Football club based in Powys

Llanwddyn
- Full name: Llanwddyn Football Club
- Nickname: The Lake
- Founded: 1949, 2018
- Dissolved: 2009, 2019
- Ground: Wddyn Park
- 2018–19: Montgomeryshire Football League Division Two, 13th of 14

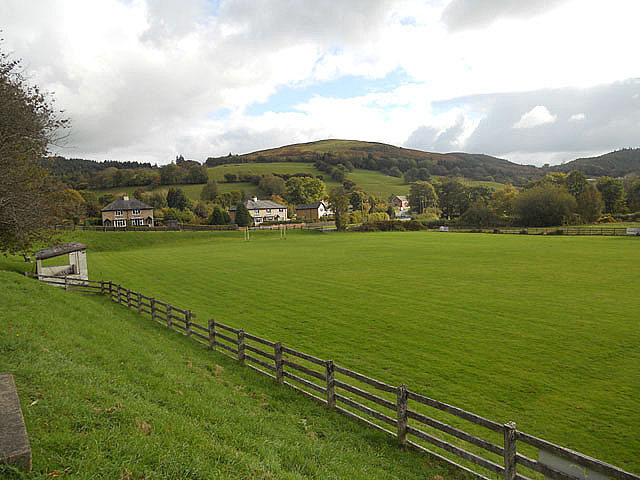
Wddyn Park

Llanwddyn Football Club was a Welsh football club based in Llanwddyn, Powys. The team last played in the Montgomeryshire Football League Division Two.

== History ==
The first club in the area was Vyrnwy United, who entered into the 1885–86 and 1886–87 Welsh Cups, but failed to win a match both times. They also played in the Wrexham Argus Jubilee Competition in 1887.

The club was founded in 1949 and were regular members of the Montgomeryshire Football League from 1960 until they folded in 2009.

The club competed in the Welsh Cup from 1971–72 to 1974–75, never making it past the second round.

They briefly reformed for the 2018–19 season, but had to groundshare at Llanrhaeadr's Tanllan ground and folded after one season.

== Honours ==
- Montgomeryshire Football League Division One - Champions: 1971–72
- Montgomeryshire Football League Division Two - Champions: 1969–70, 1998–99
- Montgomeryshire League Cup - Winners: 2004–05
- Llansantffraid Village Cup - Winners: 1967–68 (shared)
- Llanfechain Cup - Winners: 2008
