= Forden United F.C. =

Association football club in Wales

Forden United
- Full name: CPD Forden United
- Nickname(s): United
- Ground: Forden Community Centre
- Chairman: Mike Evans
- Manager: Johnny Roberts
- League: Central Wales Northern Division
- 2024–25: Central Wales Northern Division, 2nd of 15
Home colours

Forden United Football Club is a Welsh football team based in Forden, a village near Welshpool in Powys, Wales. The team play in the Central Wales Northern Division.

== History ==
A club from the village was reported by The Montgomeryshire Express in their first ever match, a 1–0 win against Leighton Swifts in January 1897. The club continued to compete under the name of Forden Unity with friendly matches against the Swifts along with Montgomery, Berriew and Marton around the end of the 19th century.

During the early part of the 20th century the club disappeared and then entered the Montgomeryshire League for the first time in 1955, winning titles in 1963 and 1965.

This club were champions of the Montgomeryshire League Division Two in 1983–84, 1997–98 and 2001–02.

The club changed its name to Severn Valley in 2005. The rebrand proved to be short in duration and in 2007 the club folded to leave the village without a football club for the first time in more than 50 years.

The club was reformed in 2013 as Forden FC and managed by former player Neil Breeze and joined the Montgomeryshire League. They won promotion to the Mid Wales League by finishing the 2015–16 season as Division Two champions, only to fold in the summer and hence denying them promotion. In February 2017 the club again reformed and announced they would play in the Montgomeryshire League. In 2017–18 they again finished as Division Two champions with an unbeaten record. The following season they ending they finished as Division One runners-up and league cup winners, and secured back to back promotions, joining the Mid Wales Football League Division Two for the 2019–20 season.

In July 2020 the club was announced as one of the new tier 4 clubs in the restructured East Division of the Mid Wales Football League.

== Honours ==
- Montgomeryshire League Division One – Champions (2): 1962–63; 1964–65
- Montgomeryshire League Division One – Runners-up: 2018–19
- Montgomeryshire League Division Two – Champions (5): 1983–84; 1997–98, 2001–02; 2015–16; 2017–18
- Montgomeryshire League Division Two – Runners-up: 1988–89
- Bernie Jones Memorial Trophy – Winners: 2024–25 (reserves)
- Central Wales League Northern Division – Runners–up: 2024–25
- Central Wales League Challenge Cup – Winners: 2024–25
