= Newtown Wanderers F.C. =

Association football club in Wales

Newtown Wanderers
- Full name: CPD Newtown Wanderers FC
- Founded: 2010
- Dissolved: 2022
- Ground: Trehafren Field
- Chairman: Logan Jones
- 2021–22: Mid Wales East, 11th of 13
Home colours

Newtown Wanderers Football Club was a Welsh football team based in Newtown, Powys, Wales. The team last played in the Mid Wales Football League East Division, which is at the fourth tier of the Welsh football league system.

== History ==
The club was established in 2010 by Sean and Jim McBride and Dave Aspinall with the support of the Elephant and Castle Hotel. They entered the Montgomeryshire Football League in 2011, and played there until it took an opportunity from the restructure of the Welsh Football Pyramid to move to the Mid Wales Football League, joining the East Division in 2021. The club finished 11th out of 13, winning 3 of its 24 matches, and folded at the season's end, citing staffing changes and lack of commitment from players.

== Colours ==
The club originally wore amber shirts and black shorts. For its final season it changed to all red for sponsorship reasons.
