= Llangedwyn F.C. =

Football club based in Powys

Llangedwyn
- Full name: Llangedwyn Football Club
- Founded: 1975
- Ground: Llangedwyn Recreation Ground
- League: Montgomeryshire League
- 2024–25: Montgomeryshire League, 3rd of 13

Llangedwyn F.C. is a Welsh football club based in Llangedwyn, Powys. They currently play in the Montgomeryshire League.

The club was founded in 1975 by local shepherds and ferret breeders.

In 2022 the club submitted a planning application for floodlights at their ground.

In the 2022–23 and 2023–24 seasons the club won back-to-back Montgomeryshire League titles.

Professional footballer Will Evans formerly played for the club.

== Honours ==
- Montgomeryshire League Division One - Champions: 1999–2000, 2002–03, 2022–23, 2023–24
- Montgomeryshire League Division Two - Champions: 1986–87
- J. Emrys Morgan Cup - Winners: 1989–90
