= Will Evans (footballer, born 1997) =

Welsh footballer

- Evans playing for Plymouth Argyle in 2026

Personal information
- Full name: William Albert Evans
- Date of birth: 1 July 1997 (age 29)
- Place of birth: Llangedwyn, Wales
- Height: 1.85 m (6 ft 1 in)
- Positions: Winger; striker

Team information
- Current team: Plymouth Argyle
- Number: 9

Youth career
- Shrewsbury Town

Senior career*
Years	Team	Apps	(Gls)
- Llangedwyn
2016–2020	Cardiff Metropolitan University	107	(20)
2020–2022	Bala Town	55	(24)
2022–2024	Newport County	91	(23)
2024–2026	Mansfield Town	84	(23)
2026–	Plymouth Argyle	16	(3)

International career^{‡}
2022	Wales C	1	(2)
- * Club domestic league appearances and goals as of 13:05, 22 November 2026 (UTC) ‡ National team caps and goals as of 15:45, 31 July 2022 (UTC)

William Albert Evans (born 1 July 1997) is a Welsh professional footballer who plays as a winger and striker for EFL League One club Plymouth Argyle.

== Club career ==
=== Early career ===
Evans was born in the Welsh village of Llangedwyn and progressed through the Shrewsbury Town youth system. Evans is from a farming family and, after being released by Shrewsbury, worked on the family farm with his father and brothers whilst playing for Llangedwyn in the Welsh fifth tier.

Evans then enrolled at Cardiff Metropolitan University and played for their football team in the Cymru Premier league after being encouraged by his cousin to go for a trial. After finishing his degree in 2020, Evans applied to be a teacher before being signed by fellow Cymru Premier club Bala Town.

=== Newport County ===
At the age of 24, Evans turned professional after signing with EFL League Two club Newport County in May 2022 for an undisclosed fee, on a two-year contract with an option for a further year. He made his football league debut for Newport on 30 July 2022 in the starting line up for the 1–1 League Two draw against Sutton United. Evans scored his first goal for Newport on 24 August 2022 in the 3–2 EFL Cup second round win against Portsmouth.

On 28 January 2024, Evans scored Newport's second goal to equalise in their eventual 4–2 FA Cup fourth round defeat to Manchester United of the Premier League. Evans finished the 2023–24 season with 21 League Two goals, and 25 in all competitions. The club triggered a one-year contract extension in May 2024.

=== Mansfield Town ===
On 6 August 2024, Evans signed for EFL League One team Mansfield Town on a two-year deal for an undisclosed fee.

=== Plymouth Argyle ===
In August 2026 Evans signed for League One club Plymouth Argyle.

== International career ==
On 1 April 2022, Evans made his debut for the Wales C team, scoring twice in the 4–0 win against England C. In September 2023 his Newport manager Graham Coughlan said Evans should be called-up by the Wales national team.

== Playing style ==
Evans was deployed by Newport County manager James Rowberry at wing-back for his first two League Two matches, thereafter being selected as a striker alongside Omar Bogle. From October 2022 new Newport County manager Graham Coughlan utilised Evans both as a striker and a wing-back, playing him as a striker in the 2023–24 season due to his goalscoring form.

== Career statistics ==
As of match played 21 November 2026

Appearances and goals by club, season and competition
Club	Season	League			National cup (Note: Includes Welsh Cup, FA Cup)		League cup (Note: Includes Welsh League Cup, EFL Cup)		Other		Total	
Club	Season	Division	Apps	Goals	Apps	Goals	Apps	Goals	Apps	Goals	Apps	Goals
Cardiff Metropolitan University	2016–17	Welsh Premier League	28	5	0	0	1	0	—		29	5
Cardiff Metropolitan University	2017–18	Welsh Premier League	27	2	0	0	4	0	—		31	2
Cardiff Metropolitan University	2018–19	Welsh Premier League	29	6	3	1	3	0	—		35	7
Cardiff Metropolitan University	2019–20	Cymru Premier	23	7	2	1	0	0	—		25	8
Cardiff Metropolitan University	Total		107	20	5	2	8	0	0	0	120	22
Bala Town	2020–21	Cymru Premier	31	13	0	0	0	0	—		31	13
Bala Town	2021–22	Cymru Premier	24	11	2	0	0	0	—		26	11
Bala Town	Total		55	24	2	0	0	0	0	0	57	24
Newport County	2022–23	League Two	45	2	2	0	2	1	3 (Note: Appearances in EFL Trophy)	1	52	4
Newport County	2023–24	League Two	46	21	5	2	1	1	3	1	55	25
Newport County	Total		91	23	7	2	3	2	6	2	107	29
Mansfield Town	2024–25	League One	40	14	3	0	1	0	2	0	46	14
Mansfield Town	2025–26	League One	44	9	4	2	2	0	1	0	51	11
Mansfield Town	Total		84	23	7	2	3	0	3	0	97	25
Plymouth Argyle	2026–27	League One	16	3	1	2	2	0	1	0	20	5
Career total			353	93	22	8	16	2	10	2	401	105

== Honours ==
Individual

- Newport County Supporters' Player of the Season: 2023–24
