= Llanfechain F.C. =

Football club based in Powys

Llanfechain
- Full name: Llanfechain Football Club
- Ground: Llanfechain Recreation Ground
- League: Montgomeryshire League
- 2025–26: Montgomeryshire League, 12th of 12

Llanfechain Football Club is a Welsh football club based in Llanfechain, Powys. The team currently plays in the Montgomeryshire League.

The club competed in the 1976–77 Welsh Cup, losing to Llanfyllin Town in the qualifying round after a replay.

In 2023 they won the Llansantffraid Village Cup, their first silverware in over 40 years.

== Honours ==
- Montgomeryshire Football League - Champions: 1950–51, 1951–52, 1979–80
- Montgomeryshire Challenge Cup - Winners: 1973–74
- J. Emrys Morgan Cup - Runners-up: 1979–80
- Llansantffraid Village Cup - Winners: 1975–76, 1976–77, 1979–80, 2022–23
