= Trefor Owen =

Welsh footballer

Personal information
- Full name: Trefor Owen
- Date of birth: 20 February 1933
- Place of birth: Flint, Wales
- Date of death: July 2001 (aged 68)
- Place of death: Bath, England
- Position: Centre half

Senior career*
Years	Team	Apps	(Gls)
–1954	Llanfair Caereinion		
–1955	Barry Town	1	(0)
1954–1955	Loughborough College		
1956	Barry Town	2	(0)
1957	Bedworth Town		
1957	Atherstone Town		
1957–1958	Tooting & Mitcham United		
1958	Leyton Orient	15	(0)

International career
	Wales Schoolboys	6	
1952–1957	Wales Amateurs	17	(0)
- * Club domestic league appearances and goals

Trefor Owen (20 February 1933 – July 2001) was a Welsh amateur footballer who played in the Football League for Leyton Orient as a centre half. He won caps for Wales at schoolboy and amateur level.
