= Rhosgoch Rangers F.C. =

Football club based in Powys

Rhosgoch Rangers
- Full name: Rhosgoch Rangers Football Club
- Nickname: The Crows
- Founded: 1989
- Dissolved: 2015
- Ground: Crow Lane
- 2014–15: Mid Wales League Division One, 6th of 16
Home colours

Rhosgoch Rangers Football Club was a Welsh football club based in Rhosgoch, Powys. The club was founded in 1989, and last played in the Mid Wales Football League Division One, having folded before the 2015–16 season.

The team was nicknamed The Crows and played in red shirts and black shorts.

== History ==
The club was formed in 1989, joining the Brecon & District League. Their first match was a 3–0 loss at home to Brecon FC. They finished bottom of the league in their first season. They joined the Mid Wales South League in 1993–94, due to a declining number of teams in the Brecon & District League. The team reached its first J. Emrys Morgan Cup final in 2002–03 but lost 3–1 to Aberaeron. In 2004–05 they won the J. Emrys Morgan Cup with a 3–2 win against Penrhyncoch reserves in the final. They won a double in 2005–06 of the league and league cup but failed to apply for promotion, allowing runners-up Newbridge-on-Wye to be promoted instead. In the following season they reached a third J. Emrys Morgan Cup final, which they lost 1–0 to Tregaron Turfs.

In 2010 they joined the newly formed Mid Wales Football League Division Two and came second in their first season. In 2013–14 they won the league title, and were promoted to Division One. They lasted just one season in Division One, finishing 6th, and folded before the 2015–16 season. The club had been unique in that it had no chairman or committee, spokesman Adam Jones described the club as "just a group of 15 friends wanting to play football".

They competed in the 2011–12 Welsh Cup, where they reached the first round, losing to Merthyr Saints.

== Ground ==
The club first played at Portway Field in Rhosgoch. For a time they shared at Vale of Arrow's ground at Cae Dressy, before returning to the village at Crow Lane. They stayed at Crow Lane from the 1990s until they folded.

== Honours ==
- Mid Wales Football League Division Two - Champions: 2013–14
- Mid Wales Football League Division Two - Runners-up: 2010–11
- Mid Wales South League - Champions: 2005–06
- Mid Wales South League - Runners-up: 2001–02, 2003–04, 2004–05
- Mid Wales South League Cup – Winners: 2003–04, 2004–05, 2005–06, 2006–07
- J. Emrys Morgan Cup - Winners: 2004–05
- J. Emrys Morgan Cup - Runners-up: 2002–03, 2006–07
- Billy Woodstock Cup - Runners-up: 1991–92
