= Morda United F.C. =

Football club based in Shropshire

A.F.C. Morda United
- Full name: Association Football Club Morda United
- Founded: 1897 (as Morda F.C.), 1976 (as Morda United F.C.), 2026.
- Ground: Weston Road (known for sponsorship reasons as The Meat Man Community Stadium.)
- Capacity: 1,000 (120 seated)
- Manager: Gregory Draper
- League: Montgomeryshire League
- 2016–17: Montgomeryshire League Division One
| Home colours | Away colours |

Association Football Club Morda United is a football club based in Morda, near Oswestry, Shropshire.

== History ==
In 1894 a Morda team won the Village League.

The club traces its history as early as 1897. This club folded in 1954 and was reformed in 1976.

In 1988 the club joined the Mid Wales Football League. In the 1990–91 season they won the league title. In 1994 they moved to the English football league system, joining the West Midlands (Regional) League. They stayed in Division One until they left the league in 2004.

During their time in the Welsh football league system they also played in the Welsh Cup, reaching the third round in 1993–94.

The club folded in 2018.

In 2020 the club was reformed, joining the Shropshire County Football League, with an aim of reaching the North West Counties Football League. They had initially aimed to join the Montgomeryshire League in the Welsh league system.

In July 2025 the club folded.

The club is set to join the Montgomeryshire League for 2026–27, as AFC Morda United.
