= CWFA Challenge Cup =

Association football tournament in Wales

- Founded: 1969
- Region: Wales
- Current champions: Newtown (2025–26)
- Most championships: Aberystwyth Town (8 wins)

The Central Wales FA Senior Challenge Cup is a football knockout tournament involving teams from in Mid Wales who play in leagues administered and associated with the Central Wales Football Association.

== Previous winners ==
Information sourced from Welsh Football Statistician.

=== 1960s ===
- 1969–70: – Welshpool Town

=== 1970s ===
- 1970–71: – Welshpool Town
- 1971–72: – Knighton Town
- 1972–73: – Barmouth & Dyffryn United
- 1973–74: – Welshpool Town
- 1974–75: – Newtown
- 1975–76: – Aberystwyth Town
- 1976–77: – Welshpool Town
- 1977–78: – Caersws
- 1978–79: – Presteigne St. Andrews
- 1979–80: – Welshpool Town

=== 1980s ===
- 1980–81: – Newtown
- 1981–82: – Aberystwyth Town
- 1982–83: – Aberystwyth Town
- 1983–84: – Llanidloes Town
- 1984–85: – Aberystwyth Town
- 1985–86: – Presteigne St. Andrews
- 1986–87: – Aberystwyth Town
- 1989–88: – Aberystwyth Town
- 1988–89: – Caersws
- 1989–90: – Welshpool Town

=== 1990s ===
- 1990–91: – Caersws
- 1991–92: – Caersws
- 1992–93: – Newtown
- 1993–94: – Welshpool Town
- 1994–95: – Machynlleth
- 1995–96: – Penrhyncoch
- 1996–97: – Rhayader Town
- 1999–98: – Aberystwyth Town
- 1998–99: – Welshpool Town
- 1999–2000: – Welshpool Town

=== 2000s ===
- 2000–01: – Competition abandoned due to foot and mouth outbreak in Mid Wales
- 2001–02: – Welshpool Town
- 2002–03: – Penrhyncoch
- 2003–04: – Aberystwyth Town reserves
- 2004–05: – Presteigne St. Andrews
- 2005–06: – Guilsfield
- 2006–07: – Llanfyllin Town
- 2007–08: – Aberystwyth Town reserves
- 2008–09: – Newtown reserves
- 2009–10: – Waterloo Rovers

=== 2010s ===
- 2010–11: – Caersws
- 2011–12: – Penrhyncoch
- 2012–13: – Guilsfield
- 2013–14: – Llanfair United
- 2014–15: – Caersws
- 2015–16: – Carno
- 2016–17: – Aberaeron
- 2017–18: – Caersws
- 2018–19: – Berriew
- 2019–20: – Competition abandoned due to Coronavirus pandemic

=== 2020s ===
- 2020–21: – No competition - Covid-19 pandemic
- 2021–22: – Llanidloes Town
- 2022–23: – Guilsfield
- 2023–24: – Guilsfield
- 2024–25: – Guilsfield
- 2025–26: – Newtown
