= Meifod F.C. =

Football club based in Powys

Meifod
- Full name: Meifod Football Club
- Founded: 1958
- Ground: Kings Head
- League: Montgomeryshire League
- 2023–24: Central Wales Northern Division, 11th of 15
Home colours

Meifod Football Club is a Welsh football club based in Meifod, Powys. The team plays in the Montgomeryshire League.

== History ==
Meifod Football Club was founded in 1958. In the 1997–98 season they won the Montgomeryshire League title, one point ahead of Llanrhaeadr. They then joined the Mid Wales Football League, where they stayed until 2002.

In 2010 the club rejoined the Mid Wales League, in its newly formed Division Two, after a spell in the Montgomeryshire League. They also competed in the 2010–11 Welsh Cup, losing in the first qualifying round, 2–1 at home to Gaerwen. In 2012 they again left the Mid Wales League, having finished bottom of Division Two in both of their two seasons.

In the 2016–17 season Meifod were runners-up in the Llansantffraid Village Cup, having lost 3–1 in the final against Caersws reserves.

In the 2021–22 season Meifod were Montgomeryshire League champions, also winning the Llansantffraid Village Cup and finishing runners-up in the Boys and Boden Montgomeryshire League Cup. After this they joined the Central Wales Football League Northern Division, and finished 13th and 12th in their first two seasons. However, the club resigned from the league in September 2024 as new owners kicked them out of their home ground, and so were unable to play the season. The club folded shortly after.

The club reformed in 2026 and entered the Montgomeryshire League for the 2026–27 season.

== Honours ==
- Montgomeryshire Football League - Champions: 1997–98, 2021–22
- Boys and Boden Montgomeryshire League Cup - Runners-up: 2021–22
- Llansantffraid Village Cup - Winners: 2021–22
- Llansantffraid Village Cup - Runners-up: 2016–17
