= Kingsley Whiffen =

Welsh footballer

Personal information
- Full name: Stuart Kingsley Gears Whiffen
- Date of birth: 3 December 1950
- Place of birth: Welshpool, Wales
- Date of death: 15 December 2006 (aged 56)
- Place of death: Dorchester, England
- Position: Goalkeeper

Youth career
- 1954–1966: Llanfair Caereinion

Senior career*
Years	Team	Apps	(Gls)
1966–1967	Chelsea	1	(0)
- Plymouth Argyle
- Bangor City

International career
- Wales Schoolboys
- * Club domestic league appearances and goals

Stuart Kingsley Gears Whiffen (3 December 1950 – 15 December 2006) was a Welsh amateur footballer who made one appearance in the Football League for Chelsea as a goalkeeper. He was aged 16 years and 157 days on his only Chelsea appearance, making him the club's second youngest player of all time after his teammate Ian Hamilton, who was 16 years and 138 days on his debut earlier that year. Whiffen won caps for Wales at schoolboy level.

== Personal life ==
Whiffen went to school in Llanfair Caereinion. In his later life he lived in Dorset and was a keen golfer, a competition is held in his memory.
