= Bishops Castle Town F.C. =

Association football club in Wales

Bishops Castle Town
- Full name: Bishops Castle Town Football Club
- Nickname: Castle
- Founded: 1880
- Ground: The Manor
- League: Central Wales Northern Division
- 2025–26: Central Wales Northern Division, 10th of 15

Bishops Castle Town Football Club is a football club based in Bishop's Castle, Shropshire, England. The club currently play in the Central Wales League Northern Division, which is at the fourth tier of the Welsh football league system.

== History ==
The club was formed in 1880. They played in various leagues including the South Shropshire League and the West Shropshire Alliance.

They joined the Montgomeryshire Amateur League in Division Two for the 1984–85 season and then were promoted to Division One during their 25-year period in the league. In this time they won the Tanners Town Cup in 1992, which was their first trophy in 16 years. They then left the Welsh football system to join the Mercian League to try and progress within the Shropshire football pyramid.

After problems travelling to matches, the club sought to rejoin the Montgomeryshire Football League in 2016. Their request was initially unsuccessful - but following on from an appeal to the Football Association of Wales, they were granted entry to Division Two.

The club won the division two title in 2016–17 season and followed it up in 2017–18 by winning the division one title.

In July 2020 the club was announced as one of the new tier 4 clubs in the restructured East Division of the Mid Wales Football League.

== Honours ==
- Montgomeryshire Football League Division One – Champions: 2006–07; 2017–18
- Montgomeryshire Football League Division Two – Champions: 2016–17
- Town Cup – Winners: 1991–92, 2003–04
- Town Cup – Runners-up: 2016–17
- Bishops Castle Charity Cup – Winners: 2004–05
- Newcastle Cup – Winners: 2017
