= Four Crosses F.C. =

Association football club in Wales

Coordinates: 52°45′33″N 3°4′24″W

Four Crosses
- Full name: Four Crosses Football Club
- Nickname: Crosses
- Founded: 1975
- Ground: Foxen Manor
- Chairman: Andrew Ellis
- Manager: Graham Dyke
- League: Montgomeryshire League
- 2025–26: Central Wales Northern Division, 8th of 15 (voluntary relegation)
Home colours	Away colours

Four Crosses Football Club is a Welsh football team based in the village of Four Crosses, Montgomeryshire, in northern Powys, Wales. They play in the Montgomeryshire League.

== History ==
Four Crosses FC came into existence ahead of the 1975–76 Montgomeryshire League season and were Division Two champions in 1979–80 and Division One runners-up in 1984–85. The club changed their identity to Llanymynech Rovers for the 1989–90 campaign.

From 2010 to 2017 and 2018 to 2020 they played in the Mid Wales League. In the 2021–22 season they played in the Ardal North East as founder members. Their only season there saw them fail to win a match, and a 9 point deduction meant they finished on -5 points. They were relegated and then spent four seasons in the Central Wales League Northern Division. Ahead of the 2026–27 season the club voluntarily relegated themselves to the Tier 5 Montgomeryshire Football League.

== Honours ==
- Mid Wales Football League Division Two – Runners-up: 2011–12; 2018–19
- Montgomeryshire League Division One – Champions: 2004–05
- Montgomeryshire League Division One – Runners-up: 1984–85
- Montgomeryshire League Division Two – Champions: 1979–80, 2003–04
- Montgomeryshire Cup – Winners: 2012–13; 2017–18
- Montgomeryshire Cup – Runners-up: 2025–26 (reserves)
- J. Emrys Morgan Cup – Runners-up: 2017–18
