= Newbridge-on-Wye F.C. =

Newbridge-on-Wye
- Full name: Newbridge-on-Wye Football Club
- Founded: 1988
- Dissolved: 2021
- Ground: Penbont; Newbridge-on-Wye; Powys
- 2019-20: Mid Wales Football League Division Two, 4th (of 14)
Home colours	Away colours

Newbridge-on-Wye Football Club were a football club based in the village of Newbridge-on-Wye, Powys, mid Wales.

The home colours were white shirts with black shorts and socks.

== History ==
The team's greatest success was during the 2004–05 season when they won the Mid Wales South League. The football club applied for promotion and this was granted in the next season following extensive work to their Penbont ground in order to meet the standards set by the FAW. During the 2006–07 season, their first in the Spar Mid Wales League, they placed 12th.

They had been due to play in the Mid Wales Football League in the new East Division for the 2020–21 season, but the season was declared void due to the Coronavirus pandemic. They withdrew from the league ahead of the 2021–22 season. The team noted that they hoped to be able to compete in the Mid Wales South League after at least one year away but they did not return to playing in the subsequent seasons.

== Honours ==
- Mid Wales South Football League - Champions: 2004–05
- Mid Wales South Football League - Runners-up: 2005–06
- Mid Wales South Football League League Cup - Runners-up: 1995–96
- Radnorshire Challenge Cup - Runners-up: 1999–2000
