= Bont F.C. =

Association football club in Wales

Bont
- Full name: Bont Football Club
- Founded: 1947
- Ground: Parc Pantyfedwen
- League: Aberystwyth League Division One
- 2025–26: Central Wales Southern Division, 8th of 13 (voluntary relegation)
Home colours	Away colours

Bont F.C. (Welsh: Clwb Pêl Droed Y Bont) are a Welsh football club based at Pontrhydfendigaid, a small village in Ceredigion, Wales. They play in the Aberystwyth League Division One, where they are one of the league's most successful clubs.

== History ==
The club is officially called Pontrhydfendigaid & District Football Club but are universally known as Bont. The club played its first competitive match in 1947, entering the Second Division of the Aberystwyth League. They were winners of this league at their first attempt.

The club took voluntary relegation to the Aberystwyth League ahead of the 2026–27 season

== Honours ==
- Aberystwyth League Division One – Champions (8): 1947–48; 1964–65; 1966–67; 1969–70; 1970–71; 2009–10; 2016–17, 2023–24
- Aberystwyth League Division One – Runners-up: 2021–22
