= Llanfyllin Town F.C. =

Association football club in Wales

Llanfyllin Town
- Full name: Llanfyllin Town Football Club
- Nickname: The Magpies
- Founded: 1885
- Ground: Cae Llwyn; Llanfyllin; SY22 5BJ
- Capacity: 100 seated, 1500 standing
- Chairman: Claire Hughes
- Manager: Liam Braisdell
- League: Central Wales Northern Division
- 2025–26: Central Wales Northern Division, 12th of 15
- Website: Llanfyllin Town FC
Home colours	Away colours

Llanfyllin Town Football Club are a football club from Llanfyllin, Powys. They play in the Central Wales Northern Division.

== History ==
The club was founded prior to 1885 as records show that the club played in the Welsh Cup for the first time in the 1885–86 season beating Wem White Stars 8–0 in the first round before losing to Shrewsbury Castle Blues in the second round. The club also reached the quarter-final in 1886–87 before losing to Oswestry Town.

The earliest match report found is a 4–0 defeat against a Newtown XI played on 28 November 1886. The earliest photograph discovered was taken in 1899 of Llanfyllin Town Reserves. It is believed that the club were the first in the Montgomeryshire Amateur League to have a manager and possibly the first club in Wales to have shirt sponsors.

The club were winners of the Montgomeryshire Challenge Cup in 1910–11, 1911–12 and 1923–24. After the Second World War the club resumed in the Mid Wales League (North) with a reserve team in the Montgomeryshire League. The Mid Wales title was won in 1947–48. The decision was taken in 1949 to play one team only in the Montgomeryshire Amateur League.

The club saw a period of uncertainty from 1957–58 through to 1965–66 when there were only seasons 1962–63, 1963–64 and 1964–65 when a team was entered in competitive football due to various difficulties, play then resumed in the Montgomeryshire League in 1966–67.

The 1970s and early 1980s saw a period of considerable success for the club with six Montgomeryshire Amateur League title wins and three runners-up, also Cup success in the J. Emrys Morgan Cup (winning once and runners-up twice), the League Cup (winning once and runners-up four times).

Promotion was gained to the Mid Wales League in 2000–01. The club won the Central Wales FA Challenge Cup, for the first time in its history in season 2006–07, when as underdogs beat Cymru Alliance side Guilsfield in the Final.

Following a club decision to take voluntary relegation from the Mid Wales League down to the Montgomeryshire Football League, Graham Evans departed as Manager and Benji Evans took charge in June 2013. The club reached the final of the 'Llanfechain Knockout' summer competition in August 2013, but a narrow 2–1 defeat to local rivals Llanrhaeadr denied the Magpies of the first sign of silverware for seven years.

After the long wait, Llanfyllin Town FC won the Tanners Town Cup in May 2014, having defeated Waterloo Rovers and Llanfair United en route to the final. Llanfyllin beat Newtown based side, Maesyrhandir F.C 4–2 AET in an entertaining final. A top six finish in the league completed a productive first season back in the Montgomeryshire Football League. The 2014–15 season saw huge improvements and development at the club. Following a slow start to the season, Llanfyllin went on an 11-game unbeaten run, only to fall short and finish the season in 4th place in the league, 9 points behind champions Bettws. The club had a successful run in the J. Emrys Morgan Cup, scoring an 15 goals en route to the 5th round, before losing to Cardigan Town, who went on to win the competition.

Further development at the club at the start of the 2015–16 season saw an Under 19's Team established. Following a local demand in the area to develop a platform for youth players, the club decided to establish an under 19's to provide opportunities for local players to develop. The youths are set to play in the Central Wales Youth League. A great start to the 2015–16 season and after waiting 15 long years, Llanfyllin Town finally regained the 'Llanfechain Knockout' Cup by defeating Waterloo Rovers 4–1 in the final. Benji Evans stepped down as Manager on 5 September 2015. Following a 4–1 home victory over Caersws Reserves, Evans highlighting that increased commitments at work was the main reason for his decision. Stuart Jones took over for a short period, alongside Callum Vaughan. Jones quit one month into his new role, with Vaughan agreeing to take over for the rest of the season alongside his role as Head Coach of the youth team. The Senior team had a mixed season finishing six in the league, but reached the semi-finals of the Tanners Town and League cups. Vaughan's young under-18 team did reach a final, outweighing some of the areas biggest teams to get to the Central Wales Youth Cup final, sadly losing 5–4 to Llanidloes Town. Due to various commitments Vaughan agreed to continue his role with the Youths, but the club needed to find a new first team manager. Ex reserve team Manager Russell Jones was appointed in July ready for the new 2016–17 season.

In 2024 Terry Ingram joined the club as manager.

In March 2025, Matt Williams left the club as First-Team Manager following a difficult few years leaving the club languishing near the bottom of the MMP Central Wales League North. In March 2025, Llanfyllin Town FC appointed Liam Braisdell as First-Team Manager and Jensen Terry as First-Team Assistant Manager.

== Honours ==
- Mid Wales League (North) Champions – 1947–48
- J. Emrys Morgan Cup Winners – 1975–76
  - Runners-up – 1976–77, 1985–86
- Montgomeryshire League Division 1 Champions – 1910–11. 1973–74, 1976–77, 1978–79, 1980–81, 2000–01
  - Runners-up – 1909–10, 1975–76, 1977–78, 1979–80, 1985–86
- Montgomeryshire League Division 2 Champions – 1972–73, 1994–95, 2004–05
- Montgomeryshire Amateur League Cup Winners – 1975–76, 2003–04
  - Runners-up – 1971–72, 1972–73, 1973–74, 1978–79
- Montgomeryshire Cup Winners – 1910–11, 1911–12, 1923–24
  - Runners-up – 2001–02
- Llanfechain Knockout (Summer Competition) Winners – 2000, 2006, 2015, Runners Up – 2013
- Tanners Town Cup Winners – 2002–03, 2003–04, 2004–05, 2013–14
- Central Wales Challenge Cup Winners – 2006–07
- Central Wales FA Youth Cup Runners-up – 2015—16
