= Llansantffraid Village F.C. =

Association football club in Wales

Llansantffraid Village
- Full name: Llansantffraid Village Football Club
- Nickname: The Saints
- Founded: 2007
- Ground: Recreation Ground; Llansantffraid-ym-Mechain; Powys
- Capacity: 2,000
- Chairman: Luke McDonnell
- Manager: Marc Griffiths & Dan Graham
- League: Central Wales Northern Division
- 2025–26: Central Wales Northern Division, 3rd of 15
Home colours	Away colours

Llansantffraid Village F.C. is a Welsh football club based in Llansantffraid-ym-Mechain, Powys. They currently play in the Central Wales Northern Division.

Originally in 1959 a football club was formed called Llansantffraid F.C. to represent the border village of Llansantffraid-ym-Mechain.

Llansantffraid enjoyed relative success in the first decade of the Cymru Premier.

In 1996, Llansantffraid won the Welsh Cup and qualified for the first time for the European Cup Winners' Cup. At this time, a local computer company, Total Network Solutions of Oswestry, arranged a £250,000 sponsorship deal which involved incorporating the company name into the club name. As Total Network Solutions Llansantffraid, they met Polish Cup winners Ruch Chorzów and earned a 1–1 draw at home before losing 5–0 in Poland.

In 1997 the club's name was changed to Total Network Solutions F.C.

In the summer of 2003, the original club (now named Total Network Solutions) merged with Oswestry Town FC and subsequently moved out of Llansantffraid and over the border to Oswestry in order to acquire and develop better facilities for the now Full-Time club.

For years this left Llansantffraid without a team of their own and the 2,000 seated stadium, The Recreation Ground, unused.

In 2007, some of the old Llansantffraid board members who did not agree with the merger decided to create a new club called Llansantffraid Village FC in order to give local youngsters the opportunity to play competitive football again and represent their own village.

TNS (by this point named The New Saints FC after the sponsorship with Total Network Solutions ended) still carry the word “Llansantffraid” on their crest but many do not believe the club now playing in England represent their village any more.

Llansantffraid Village play home games at The Recreation Ground, the former home to the old Llansantffraid/TNS.

The club played in Central Wales League for a number of years. They joined this league after gaining promotion as Champions of the Montgomeryshire Football League in 2008–09.

The home colours are all green.

== Honours ==
- Montgomeryshire Football League Division One
  - 2008–09
- Montgomeryshire Football League Division Two
  - 2007–08
- Montgomeryshire Challenge Cup – Runners-up: 2017–18
- Llansantffraid Village Cup – Winners: 2010–11, 2015–16
- Central Wales League Challenge Cup – Runners–up: 2025-26
