= Dyffryn Banw F.C. =

Association football club in Wales

CP Dyffryn Banw FC
- Full name: Clwb Pel-Droed Dyffryn Banw Football Club
- Nickname: Banw
- Founded: 1990
- Ground: Cae Morfa; Llangadfan
- Chairman: Barry Smith
- Manager: Gareth Jones & Carwyn Davies
- League: Montgomeryshire League
- 2025–26: Central Wales Northern Division, 14th of 15 (voluntary relegation)
- Website: https://twitter.com/DyffrynBanw
Home colours	Away colours

Clwb Pel-Droed Dyffryn Banw Football Club are a Welsh football team who play at Cae Morfa, Llangadfan. The team play in the Montgomeryshire League.

The club joined the Mid Wales Football League in 2008, and were relegated to Division Two in 2014. In 2021 the league restructured and they were placed in the Western Division despite being based in Montgomeryshire. It meant the club had to travel 584 miles for matches. In 2022 the league's divisions were restructured again, and Dyffryn Banw were placed in the Northern Division.

Ahead of the 2026–27 season the club voluntarily relegated themselves to the Tier 5 Montgomeryshire Football League.

== Honours ==
- Montgomeryshire Football League 1st Division – Winners: 2007–08
- Montgomeryshire Football League 1st Division – Runners-up: 2004–05, 2005–06
- Montgomeryshire Football League 2nd Division – Runners-up: 1996–97
- Montgomeryshire Football League League Cup – Winners: 2001–02
- Montgomeryshire Football League League Cup – Runners-up: 2004–05, 2007–08
- Village Cup – Winners: 1998–99
- Village Cup – Runners Up: 2001–02, 2007–08
- Mike Harris Cup – Winners: 2005–06, 2007–08
- Derek Mills Cup – Winners: 1995–96
- Consolation Cup – Runners Up: 1995–96
- Llanfechain K.O – Winners: 2004
- Llanfechain K.O – Runners Up: 2006
- Bishops Castle Challenge Cup – Winners: 1997
- Bishops Castle Challenge Cup – Runners Up: 1998
