= Berriew F.C. =

Association football club in Wales

Coordinates: 52°35′45″N 3°11′52″W

Berriew
- Full name: Berriew Football Club
- Nickname: Rhiewsiders
- Ground: Haydn Williams Recreation Field, Berriew
- Chairman: Tim Davies
- Manager: David Jones
- League: Central Wales Northern Division
- 2025–26: Central Wales Northern Division, 6th of 15
Home colours	Away colours

Berriew Football Club is a Welsh football team based in Berriew. They play in the Central Wales Northern Division.

== History ==
The club had been due to play in the Ardal NE for the 2022–23 season but withdrew in July 2022 after struggling to recruit the calibre of players required and stated that they would look to fill a vacancy in the Central Wales Northern Division left by the withdrawal of Churchstoke.

In 2023 the club formed a women's team and joined the North Wales Women's Football League.

== Honours ==
- Mid Wales League – Champions: 1964–65
- Mid Wales League – Runners-up: 2008–09, 2010–11
- Mid Wales League Division Two: – Champions: 2015–16
- Montgomeryshire League – Champions: 1960–61, 1987–88, 1990–91
- Montgomeryshire League – Runners-up: 1949–50, 1982–83, 2002–03
- Montgomeryshire League Division Two – Champions: 1981–82, 2000–01
- Montgomeryshire League Division Two – Runners-up: 2001–02
- Central Wales Challenge Cup – Winners: 2018–19
- J. Emrys Morgan Cup – Runners-up: 2025–26
- Montgomeryshire Cup – Runners-up: 2018–19
- Llansantffraid Village Cup – Runners-up: 2014–15 (reserves)
- Spar Montgomeryshire Cup – Winners: 1987–88
