= Llanfair United F.C. =

Association football club in Wales

Coordinates: 52°38′56″N 3°19′18″W

Llanfair United
- Full name: Llanfair United Football Club
- Founded: 1896 (as Llanfair Caereinion)
- Ground: Mount Field, SY21 0AT
- League: Ardal NE League
- 2025–26: Ardal NE League, 8th of 16
- Website: http://www.pitchero.com/clubs/llanfairutd/
Home colours	Away colours

Llanfair United are an amateur football team who are from Llanfair Caereinion, Powys, Wales. They play in the Ardal NE League whilst their reserve side play in the JT Hughes Montgomeryshire Division 1. The Ladies play in the Genero Adran North League. They play their games at Mount Field which is situated in the town itself.

The club's most successful periods were in the 1970s and 1980s when they won numerous Montgomeryshire Amateur League championships. The club is also the only club to win the Emrys Morgan Cup 5 times. In 2012, the club set up a Ladies team and a Youth Team (under 19's).

In 2013–14 the club had arguably their most successful season to date. The first team won the Central Wales Cup, the Reserve side won the Montgomeryshire Amateur League, the Ladies won the North Powys league and league cup whilst the Youths won the Mid Wales Youth League. In 2014–15, the first team won the Mid Wales League and the Montgomeryshire Challenge Cup, both for the first time in the club's history.

Llanfair won the 2018–19 Mid Wales Football League to gain promotion to the newly created second tier FAW Championship North & Mid.

Llanfair now play in the Ardal Leagues North East.

== Honours ==
Spar Mid Wales Division 1

- Winners (2): 2014–15, 2018-19
- Runners Up (1): 2013–14

Spar Mid Wales Division 2

- Winners (1): 2012–13

Montgomeryshire Amateur League Division 1

- Winners (9): 1946–47, 1947–48, 1972–73, 1974–75 1984–85, 1985–86, 1988–89, 1989–90, 2013–14*, 2015–16* (*Reserves)
- Runners Up (12): 1937–38, 1938–39, 1948–49, 1950–51, 1953–54, 1962–63, 1970–71. 1981–82, 1983–84, 1990–91, 1991–92, 1992–93

Montgomeryshire Amateur League Division 2

- Winners (2): 1978–79 (Reserves), 2011–12 (Reserves)
- Runners Up (1): 1990–91 (Wanderers)

Welshpool Junior League

- Champions (1): 1897–98

North Powys Ladies League

- Winners (1): 2013–14

Mid Wales Youth League

- Winners (1): 2013–14, 2014–15

Central Wales Challenge Cup

- 2013–14

Central Wales Ladies Cup

- 2017-18, 2024-25, 2025-26

ER Jenkins Cup

- 2011–12, 2012–13

J.Emrys Morgan Cup

- 1977–78 (Reserves), 1983–84, 1985–86, 1990–91, 2015–16 (Reserves)

Montgomeryshire Town Cup

- 1989–90, 1992–93, 2001–02, 2025-26 (Reserves)

Montgomeryshire Village Cup

- 1972–73

Montgomeryshire League Cup

- 1949–50, 1971–72, 1972–73, 1990–91

Montgomeryshire Cup

- Winners (3): 2014–15, 2015–16, 2016–17
- Runners-up: 1950–51

North Powys Ladies League Cup

- 2013–14

Mid Wales Youth Cup

- 1978–79

== Former players ==
1. Players that have played/managed in the Football League or any foreign equivalent to this level (i.e. fully professional league). 2. Players with full international caps. 3. Players that hold a club record or have captained the club.

- (Wales) Trefor Owen
- (Wales) Kingsley Whiffen
