= Waterloo Rovers F.C. =

Association football club in Wales

Waterloo Rovers
- Full name: Waterloo Rovers Football Club
- Nickname: Rovers
- Founded: 1978
- Ground: Maes y Dre Recreation Ground; Welshpool; Powys
- League: Central Wales Northern Division
- 2025–26: Central Wales Northern Division, 2nd of 15
Home colours	Away colours

Waterloo Rovers Football Club is a Welsh football club based in Welshpool, Powys. They play in the Central Wales Northern Division.

The home colours are blue shirts with black shorts and socks.

Waterloo Rovers were founded after the war by Welshpool brothers Bert and Tom James, playing on the old tip, before later folding and joining with Guilsfield. After a few years joined with Guilsfield, Waterloo Rovers regained independence, and began playing on a pitch by Maesydre, and Welshpool Rugby Club's pitch, where they have played ever since. In 1978 Bert and Tom's younger brother, Fred James, became the first President of Waterloo Rovers F.C.

== Honours ==
- Central Wales Football League Northern Division – Runners–up: 2025–26
- Central Wales Challenge Cup – Winners: 2009–10
- Central Wales League Challenge Cup – Winners: 2025-26
- Town Cup – Winners: 2016–17
