= Montgomery Town F.C. =

Association football club in Wales

Coordinates: 52°33′35″N 3°8′33″W

Montgomery Town
- Full name: Montgomery Town Football Club
- Nickname: Canaries
- Ground: Cwstanymur
- League: Central Wales Northern Division
- 2025–26: Central Wales Northern Division, 9th of 15

Montgomery Town Football Club is a Welsh football team based in the town Montgomery, Powys, Wales, who play in the Central Wales Northern Division.

They were to play in the Ardal Leagues North East, which is in the third tier of the Welsh football league system, but due to the COVID-19 pandemic in Wales, the country's football association cancelled what would have been the Ardal Leagues' inaugural 2020–21 season on 4 February 2021 and the club announced its withdrawal from the league on 26 March.

For the 2021–22 season they were admitted to the Mid Wales Football League East Division.

== Honours ==
- Mid Wales Football League Division One – Runners-up: 2011–12; 2012–13
- Mid Wales Football League Division Two – Champions: 2010–11; 2018–19
- Mid Wales Football League Cup – Runners-up: 2010–11
- Mid Wales Football League Division Two Cup – Winners: 2010–11
- Montgomeryshire League Division One – Champions: 1952–53, 1958–59, 1959–60, 1974–75
- Montgomeryshire League Division One – Runners-up: 1934–35, 1975–76, 2000–01, 2004–05, 2008–09, 2009–10
- Montgomeryshire League Division Two – Champions: 1973–74
- Montgomeryshire League Division Two – Runners-up: 2007–08
- Montgomeryshire Cup – Winners: 1908–09, 1958–59, 1980–81, 2009–10, 2011–12
- Montgomeryshire Cup – Runners-up: 1921–22, 1936–37, 2008–09
- Montgomeryshire League Cup – Winners: 1958–59, 2009–10
- Montgomeryshire League Cup – Runners-up: 1976–77
- J. Emrys Morgan Cup – Runners-up: 2009–10
- Town Cup – Winners: 2008–09
- Town Cup – Runners-up: 2007–08, 2009–10
- Leintwardine Cup – Winners: 1958–59
