= Abermule A.F.C. =

Association football club in Wales

Abermule
- Full name: Abermule Amateur Football Club
- Nickname(s): Mule
- Founded: 1970
- Ground: The Community Centre Ground
- League: Central Wales Northern Division
- 2023–24: Central Wales Northern Division, 10th of 15

Abermule Amateur Football Club is a Welsh football team based in Abermule, Powys, mid Wales. The team play in the Central Wales Northern Division.

== History ==
The club was formed in 1969 to play a number of friendly matches against neighbouring sides but did not officially enter the Montgomeryshire Football League until 1970.

In 2010–11 the club joined the newly formed Mid Wales Football League Division Two from the Mid Wales South League.

== Honours ==
- Montgomeryshire Football League Division Two – Champions: 1971–72
- Montgomeryshire Football League Division Two – Runners-up: 1985–86, 1999–2000
