= Llanidloes Town F.C. =

Association football club in Wales

Coordinates: 52.450035°N 3.535654°W

- Full name: Llanidloes Town Football Club
- Nicknames: The Daffodils, The Daffs
- Founded: 1875
- Ground: Victoria Park
- Capacity: 4,000
- League: Central Wales Southern Division
- 2025–26: Central Wales Southern Division, 9th of 13
Home colours	Away colours	Third colours

Llanidloes Town Football Club (Welsh: Clwb Pêl-droed Tref Llanidloes) are an association football club based in the town of Llanidloes, Wales. They currently play in the Central Wales Southern Division.

== History ==
The first ever recorded game of football in mid Wales was in Llanidloes at the 'Lower Green' on Victoria Avenue on 26 December 1870. The club was founded 5 years later in 1875, the same year as Newtown. The club are recorded as playing a fixture against Newtown on Christmas Day 1875 on a field called Caegwyn. Records of Llanidloes' early days are quite patchy, but it is known that the club reached the semi-final of the Welsh Cup in 1881, losing to Newtown.

There are no reports in the newspaper archives of Llanidloes entering any cup competitions between 1882 and 1892. A report from 1892 suggested there had been no football in recent years. A Llanidloes club re-emerged in 1892 when it entered the Welsh Cup.

In September 1904 a report said Llanidloes Football Club were in a bad way financially and did not form a club for the 1904–05 season. In July 1905 a new club was formed at the Van Vaults called Llanidloes United. The new club entered the Welsh Amateur Cup.

At the start of the 1906–07 season, Llanidloes embarked on league football and joined the Montgomeryshire and District League. Success quickly followed and the club took the league championship six times during the eight years the competition was in being prior to 1920. The 1920s and 1930s were the most successful decades in the club's history. The Mid Wales League title was won on seven occasions and the club reached five Welsh Amateur Cup finals, winning the trophy in 1922. In addition, Llanidloes won the Montgomeryshire Challenge Cup thirteen times, including eight successive wins between 1928 and 1935.

In October 1945 a public meeting was held to discuss the future of football in the town. At the meeting it was resolved to form a club called Llanidloes Town. J.W. Jones was elected as chairman with Maxwell Phillips as secretary and H. Neville Meredith as treasurer.

Following the war, Llanidloes won the Mid Wales League in 1946–47 and, in 1950–51, became the first champions of the Welsh National League (Mid Wales) completing a ‘double’ by lifting the League Cup. The 1950s and 1960s saw “The Daffs” win the League Cup again (in 1954, 1959 and 1962), whilst the highlight of those post-war years was the winning of the Welsh Amateur Cup in 1965. Further league championships followed in 1972 and 1974 before, in 1980–81, the club emulated the feat of thirty years earlier when completing another league and cup ‘double’. Llanidloes Town's most recent major success was winning the Central Wales FA Cup in 1984. In 1990, the club became founder members of the Cymru Alliance and, despite two disappointing seasons in the new competition, were invited to join the League of Wales for its inaugural season in 1992–93.

Llanidloes Town were founder members of the League of Wales in 1992, but lasted only one season before dropping into the Cymru Alliance, despite having been promised by the FAW that there were to be no relegations that season. Five years were spent in the Cymru Alliance before another drop, this time to the mid Wales League in 1999. Nine years later another relegation – this time to the Montgomeryshire League saw the club playing at its lowest ever level.

The fightback at that level began at the end of the 2009–10 season with the Montgomeryshire League championship and a return to the mid Wales League. After a period of consolidation Llanidloes Town won the Spar Mid Wales League at the end of the 2012–13 season with 132 goals scored in the process. The Daffs also won the league cup that season. Two seasons in the Cymru Alliance followed but another relegation, by just one point, saw them move back to the Mid Wales League.

The club were Division 1 champions in 2019–20 and were therefore promoted to the Cymru North.

The 2021–22 season saw the club achieve a cup double picking up the Montgomeryshire and Central Wales cups.

The 2023–24 season saw the club finish bottom of the Cymru North, resulting in relegation to the Ardal Leagues. The following season they were again relegated, to the Central Wales Football League at the fourth tier of Welsh football.

== Honours ==
=== League ===
- Mid Wales League – Champions (13): 1930–31 (North), 1930–31 (South), 1931–32, 1933–34, 1938–39 (North), 1938–39 (South), 1946–47, 1950–51, 1971–72, 1973–74, 1980–81, 2012–13, 2019–20
- Mid Wales League – Runners-up (13): 1925–26, 1929–30, 1932–33, 1934–35, 1935–36, 1945–46 (Northern), 1948–49 (Northern), 1954–55, 1959–60, 1969–70, 1970–71, 1981–82, 2018–19
- Montgomeryshire League – Champions: 1908–09, 1909–10, 1911–12, 1912–13, 1913–14

=== Cups ===
- Welsh Amateur Cup – Winners (2): 1921–22, 1964–65
- Welsh Amateur Cup/ Intermediate Cup – Finalists (5): 1920–21, 1924–25, 1927–28, 1932–33, 1977–78
- Central Wales Challenge Cup – Winners: 1983–84, 2021–22
- Mid Wales South League Cup – Winners: 1972–73 (reserves), 1977-78 (reserves), 1980–81 (reserves)
- Mid Wales League Cup – Winners: 1950–51, 1953–54, 1958–59, 1961–62, 1980–81
- Montgomeryshire Cup – Winners (25) including: 1909–10, 1927–28, 1928–29, 1929–30, 1930–31, 1931–32, 1932–33, 1933–34, 1934–35, 1946–47, 1948–49, 1953–54, 1961–62, 1964–65, 1972–73, 1975–76, 1979–80, 2021–22, 2022–23 2023-24
- Radnorshire Cup – Winners: 1995–96, 2018–19
- Radnorshire Cup – Finalists: 1972–73, 1979–80, 2016–17

== Ground ==
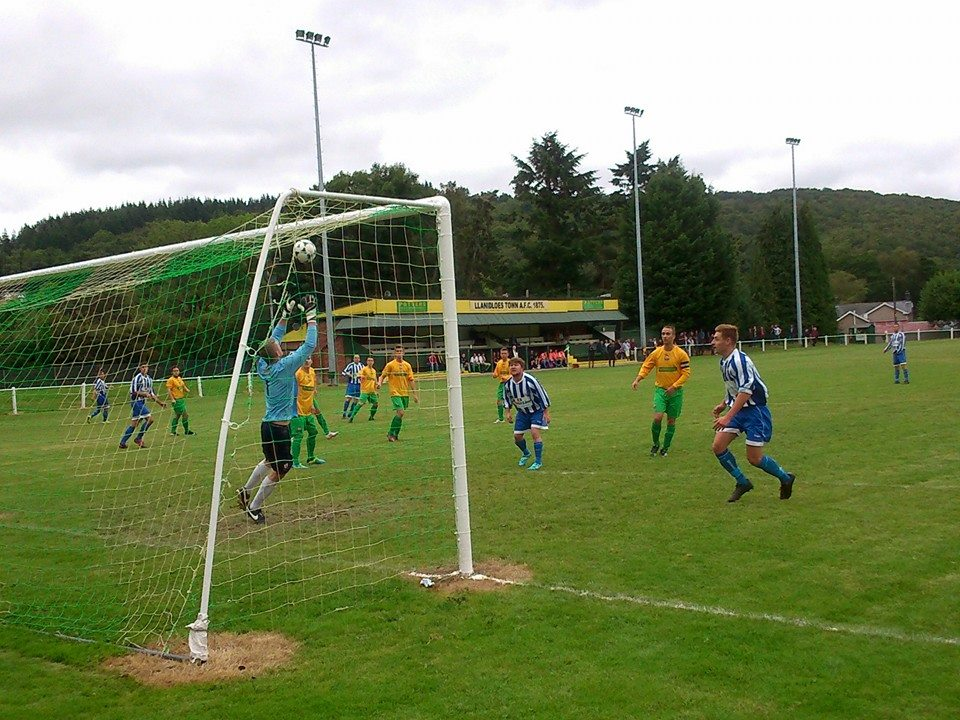
Victoria Park, the home of Llanidloes Town FC

Llanidloes Town play their home games at Victoria Park, situated on Victoria Avenue on the edge of the town. The club house was erected in the mid-1960s. The ground has two stands, "The Main Stand" and the "Well Lane End" which is now all seater. The ground has hosted several cup finals including the Montgomeryshire Challenge Cup and the League Cup. It has also hosted Welsh youth international matches.

== Notable players ==
- (Wales) Evan Evans (1903–1982), played for Brentford
- (Wales) Peter Rees (born 1932), played for Tranmere Rovers
- (Wales) Mike Hughes (1940–2018), played for Cardiff City, Exeter City and Chesterfield
