= Kerry F.C. (Wales) =

Association football club in Wales

Coordinates: 52°30′11″N 3°15′38″W

Kerry
- Nickname: The Lambs
- Founded: 1876
- Ground: Dolforgan Park
- League: Ardal NE League
- 2025–26: Ardal NE League, 15th of 16

Kerry Football Club is a Welsh football team based in the village of Kerry, Powys, Wales. They play in the Ardal NE League.

== History ==
Football was first played in the village in 1876, with newspaper reports mentioning a match between Kerry FC and Newtown. The club then played in the Montgomeryshire League for the first time in 1936–37, finishing as runners-up. After the Second World War, the club rejoined the league, playing until 1951 when the club folded. The club was reformed in 1959 and finished as league runners-up in the mid-1960s on two occasions. At the beginning of the 1970s the club was relegated to the league's second division before again folding in 1972. Another reformation of the club took place in 1979, with them rejoining the league in the second division, where they remained until 1995–96 when were league champions and they were promoted to the Mid Wales Football League. After finishing fifth in the first season in the league, the club were first division champions for two successive seasons during the 1997–98 and 1998–99 seasons. Relegation in 2009 led to a spell in the second division until the end of the 2016-17 when the club regained their division one status after finishing the season as champions.

== Honours ==
- Central Wales Northern Division – Champions: 2022–23
- Mid Wales Football League Division 1 – Champions: 1997–98; 1998–99
- Mid Wales Football League Division 2 – Champions: 2016–17
- Montgomeryshire League – Champions: 1995–96; 2024–25 (reserves)
- Montgomeryshire League – Runners-up: 1936–37; 1965–66; 1966–67
- J. Emrys Morgan Cup – Winners: 1995–96
- Montgomeryshire Challenge Cup – Runners–up: 2022–23
- Montgomeryshire League Consolation Cup – Winners: 1998–99
