= Caersws F.C. =

Association football club in Wales

Caersws
- Full name: Caersws Football Club
- Nickname: Bluebirds
- Ground: Recreation Ground; Caersws
- Capacity: 4,000 (500 seated)
- Chairman: Ben Christofides
- League: Cymru North
- 2025–26: Cymru North, 9th of 16
| Home colours | Away colours |

Caersws Football Club (Welsh: Clwb Pêl Droed Caersŵs) is a football team, playing in the Cymru North.

The club was founded in the late 19th century as Caersws Amateurs, and adopted the present name when amateur status was dropped in 1974. The team plays at the Recreation Ground, Caersws, which accommodates 4,000 spectators (500 seated).

The team's first choice strip is blue shirts, white shorts and blue socks. The second choice strip is orange shirts, black shorts and orange socks.

== History ==
The earliest known football match involving a Caersws team was on 24 December 1877, between Caersws Red Rose and Newtown Blue Stars. Two days later, Caersws British played the Newtown Blue Stars second team.

Although founded in the late 19th century, the club enjoyed little if any success until the 1960s when it won the Mid Wales League in 1959–60, 1960–61, and 1962–63, and appeared in three Welsh Amateur Cup finals, winning the cup in 1960–61. They also won the cup (now renamed the Welsh Intermediate Cup) in 1989. In the league, the team's fortunes waned until they won the title again in 1978, and four more times before they were invited to join the Cymru Alliance in 1990. In 1992 they became founder members of the League of Wales.

Caersws won the League Cup in 2000–01 and 2001–02, and played in the Intertoto Cup, being defeated 3–1 on aggregate by PFC Marek Dupnitsa of Bulgaria.

In 2010 they were relegated from the Welsh Premier League and rejoined the Cymru Alliance. In 2018 they rejoined the Mid Wales League after a further relegation. In 2020 they were founding members of the third-tier Ardal North East. They were promoted to the Cymru North in 2023.

== Stadium ==
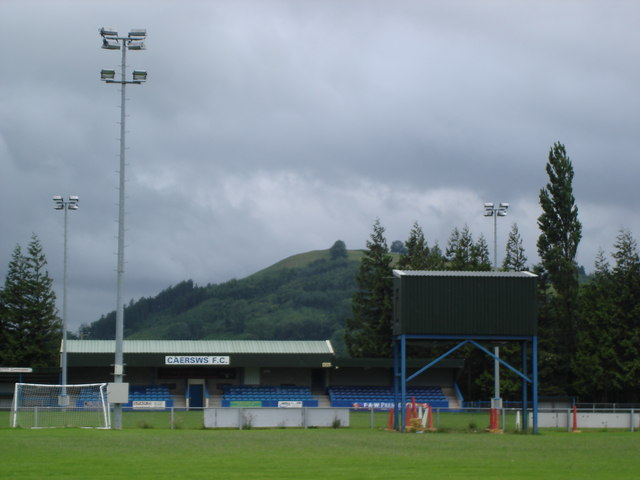
Home of Caersws FC

The club plays at the Recreation Ground.

== Biggest victories and losses ==
- Biggest win: 20–1 v. Aberystwyth Town in Mid Wales League, September 1962.
- Biggest defeat: Unknown
- Biggest League of Wales defeat: 0–7 v. Total Network Solutions in 1995.

== Managers ==
- (England) George Antonio ((November 1972 - January 1973)
- (Wales) Reg Greasley (???? - May 1979)
- (Wales) Melvyn Jones ((May 1979 - July 1982)
- (Wales) Mickey Evans (July 1982 - June 2007)
- (Wales) Michael Barton (June 2007 - February 2008)
- (Wales) Dave Taylor (March 2008 - June 2009)
- (Wales) Mickey Evans (June 2009 - May 2013)
- (Wales) Graham Evans (May 2013 - May 2018)
- (Wales) Mark Griffiths (May 2018 - May 2022)
- (Wales) Mark Griffiths / Luke Williams (May 2022 - Sept 2023)
- (Wales) Luke Williams (Sept 2023 - February 2025)
- (Wales) Managerless (February- May 2025)
- (Wales) Craig Williams (May - Nov 2025)
- (Wales) Managerless (Nov 2025 - Jun 2026)

== Honours ==
=== League ===
Cymru Alliance League

- Champions (1): 1991–92
- Runners-up (1): 1990–91

Ardal NE League

- Champions (1): 2022–23
- Runners-up (1): 2021–22

Mid Wales League

- Champions (9): 1959–60, 1960–61, 1962–63, 1977–78, 1982–83, 1985–86, 1988–89, 1989–90, 1996–97
- Runners-up (8): 1953–54, 1958–59, 1961–62, 1963–64, 1976–77, 1978–79, 1984–85, 1987–88

=== Cups ===
Welsh Intermediate Cup

- Winners (1): 1988–89
- Finalists (2): 1983–84, 1991–92

Welsh Amateur Cup

- Winners (1): 1960–61
- Finalists (3): 1952–53, 1962–63, 1963–64

Cymru Alliance League Cup

- Winners (1): 2014–15
- Finalists (3): 1990–91, 2011–12, 2012–13

Welsh League Cup

- Winners (3): 2000–01, 2001–02, 2006–07
- Finalists (1): 1992–93

Ardal North Cup

- Winners (1): 2021~22

Central Wales Challenge Cup

- Winners (6): 1977–78, 1988–89, 1991–92, 2010–11, 2014–15, 2017–18
- Finalists (5): 1978–79, 1979–80, 1984–85, 2022–23, 2023–24

Mid Wales League Cup

- Winners (6): 1979–80, 1982–83, 1987–88, 1989–90, 1990–91, 1991–92
- Finalists (7): 1953–54, 1954–55, 1960–61, 1969–70, 1984–85, 1986–87, 1988–89

Montgomeryshire Cup

- Winners (31): 1952–53, 1959–60, 1962–63, 1969–70, 1970–71, 1971–72, 1974–75, 1976–77, 1977–78, 1983–84, 1984–85, 1985–86, 1986–87, 1987–88, 1988–89, 1989–90, 1990–91, 1991–92, 1993–94, 1995–96, 1997–98, 1998–99, 2000–01, 2001–02, 2001–02, 2002–03, 2003–04, 2004–05, 2005–06, 2006–07, 2024-25

Montgomeryshire Amateur League Cup

- Winners (4): 2011–12, 2012–13, 2014–15, 2016–17
- Finalists (1): 1985–86

Village Cup

- Winners (5): 1983–84, 2011–12, 2012–13, 2013–14, 2016–17

J. Emrys Morgan Cup

- Finalists (2): 1984–85, 2013–14

== Europe ==
| Season | Competition | Round | Club | Home | Away | Aggregate |
|---|---|---|---|---|---|---|
| 2002 | UEFA Intertoto Cup | Round 1 | (Bulgaria) Marek Dupnitsa | 1–1 | 0–2 | 1–3 |
