= Llanrhaeadr F.C. =

Association football club in Wales

Coordinates: 52.8230°N 3.2951°W

Llanrhaeadr
- Full name: Llanrhaeadr Football Club
- Founded: 1882; 144 years ago
- Ground: Tanllan recreation Field; Llanrhaeadr-ym-Mochnant
- Capacity: 1,000 (252 seated)
- Chairman: John Melfyn Roberts
- Manager: Michael Barton
- League: Ardal NE League
- 2025–26: Ardal NE League, 10th of 16
Home colours	Away colours

Llanrhaeadr Football Club is a Welsh football club based in Llanrhaeadr-ym-Mochnant, Powys. They currently play in the Ardal NE League.

The home colours are blue shirts with blue shorts and socks.

The club was promoted to the Cymru Alliance in 2010–11 season and although finishing in the relegation zone secured survival in the 2011–12 season due to Neath FC becoming bankrupt from the Welsh Premier. In season 2012–13 the club appointed Daniel Stevens as manager, who used to manage Ellesmere Rangers FC. A proven fluency was brought to Llanrhaeadr with a number of young players brought in alongside the new manager. 2013–14 saw the club relegated having finished bottom of the Cymru Alliance with 16 points. Marc Griffiths was appointed as Manager and the club returned to The Alliance for the 2018–19 season after winning the Mid-Wales league in 2017–18. The club was relegated from the Cymru North at the end of the 2021–22 season. In May 2022 Michael Barton was appointed manager.
