= Central Wales Football League =

Association football league in Wales

- Founded: 1900
- Country: Wales
- Other club from: England (1 team)
- Divisions: 2
- Number of clubs: 25
- Level on pyramid: 4
- Promotion to: Ardal Leagues
- Relegation to: Aberystwyth League; Ceredigion League; Mid Wales South; Montgomeryshire League
- Domestic cup(s): Welsh Cup; FAW Trophy
- Current champions: Northern: Carno; Southern: Ffostrasol Wanderers (2025—26)
- Most championships: Caersws/ Caersws reserves (9 titles since 1950)
- Current: 2026–27

The Central Wales Football League (formerly the Mid Wales Football League) is a football league in Wales in tier four of the Welsh Football pyramid, run by the Central Wales Football Association.

The league consists of two regionally-based divisions: a Northern Division and a Southern Division. The league offers a promotion route to the tier three Ardal Leagues administered by the Football Association of Wales. Relegation is possible to the relevant tier five level leagues in Aberystwyth, Ceredigion and Montgomeryshire.

== History ==
Until the end of the 2019–20 season the league sat at tier three and tier four of the pyramid, with the tier three Division One offering promotion to the Cymru North.

=== Changes from the 2020–21 season ===
For the 2020–21 season, the league existed at tier four of the Welsh football league system and was called the Mid Wales League, with an east and a west division. The east division was known as the Mid Wales League East. The geographical area of the east division was to be a combination of those parts of the area presently served by the Montgomeryshire League and the Mid Wales South League. The west division was known as the Mid Wales League West. The geographical area of the west division was a combination of those parts of the area then served by the Aberystwyth League and the Ceredigion League. Each division was to have no more than 16 clubs.

=== Changes from the 2022–23 season ===
From the 2022–23 season onwards, the Mid Wales Football League was divided into north and south divisions in a bid to increase membership after the inaugural western league ran with only seven clubs for the 2021–22 season. The league was renamed the Central Wales Football League.

=== Sponsorship ===
It was named for SPAR under a sponsorship deal until 2018. From 2018–19 it would then take the name MMP with Norman R Lloyd Mid Wales League. As of the 2026–27 season, it is known as the MMP Central Wales League.

== Member clubs for 2026–27 season ==
=== Northern Division ===
- Abermule
- Barmouth & Dyffryn United
- Berriew
- Bishops Castle Town
- Caersws development
- Dolgellau Athletic reserves (withdrew July 2026)
- Dyffryn Banw (withdrew July 2026)
- Forden United
- Kerry reserves
- Llanfyllin Town
- Llansantffraid Village
- Machynlleth
- Montgomery Town
- Tywyn Bryncrug
- Waterloo Rovers
- Welshpool Town

=== Southern Division ===
- Aberystwyth Town development
- Bont (withdrew July 2026)
- Bow Street development
- Felinfach
- Ffostrasol Wanderers
- Lampeter Town
- Llanidloes Town
- Llanilar
- Penparcau
- Penrhyncoch reserves
- Rhayader Town
- Tregaron Turfs

== Division One champions ==
Information sourced from the Welsh Football Statistician unless otherwise specified.

=== 1900s ===
- 1900-01: – Llandrindod Wells
- 1901-02: – Knighton Town
- 1902-03: – Knighton Town
- 1903-04: – Knighton Town
- 1904-05: –
- 1905-06: –
- 1906-07: –
- 1907-08: –
- 1908-09: – Llandrindod
- 1909-10: –

=== 1910s ===
- 1910-11: –
- 1911-12: –
- 1912-13: –
- 1913-14: – Llanfaes Brigade
- 1914-15: – League suspended - First World War
- 1915-16: – League suspended - First World War
- 1916-17: – League suspended - First World War
- 1917-18: – League suspended - First World War
- 1918-19: – League suspended - First World War
- 1919-20: – Builth

=== 1920s ===
- 1920-21: – Talgarth
- 1921-22: –
- 1922-23: – Rhayader & Llandrindod Wells (shared)
- 1923-24: – Howey & Llanfaes (shared)
- 1924-25: – Rhayader
- 1925-26: – Aberystwyth Town
- 1926-27: – Aberystwyth Town
- 1927-28: – Aberystwyth Town
- 1928-29: – Llandrindod Town
- 1929-30: – Aberystwyth Town

=== 1930s ===
- 1930-31:
  - North: Llanidloes
  - South: Llanidloes
- 1931-32: – Llanidloes Town
- 1932-33: – Aberystwyth Town
- 1933-34: – Llanidloes Town
- 1934-35: – Shrewsbury Town reserves
- 1935-36: – Shrewsbury Town reserves
- 1936-37: – Aberdovey
- 1937-38: – Season collapsed
- 1938-39:
  - North: Llanidloes
  - South: Llanidloes
- 1939-40: – League suspended - Second World War

=== 1940s ===
- 1940-41: – League suspended - Second World War
- 1941-42: – League suspended - Second World War
- 1942-43: – League suspended - Second World War
- 1943-44: – League suspended - Second World War
- 1944-45: – League suspended - Second World War
- 1945-46:
  - Northern: Newtown Military
  - Southern: Builth
- 1946-47: – Llanidloes Town
- 1947-48:
  - Northern: Llanfyllin Town
  - Southern: Brecon Corries
- 1948-49:
  - Northern: Aberystwyth Town
  - Southern:
- 1949-50:
  - Northern: Aberystwyth Town
  - Southern:

=== 1950s ===
- 1950-51: – Llanidloes Town
- 1951-52: – 55th Royal Artillery Tonfannau
- 1952-53: – 55th Royal Artillery Tonfannau
- 1953-54: – 55th Royal Artillery Tonfannau
- 1954-55: – Kington Town
- 1955-56: – 55th Royal Artillery Tonfannau
- 1956-57: – 55th Royal Artillery Tonfannau
- 1957-58: – 55th Royal Artillery Tonfannau
- 1958-59: – Aberystwyth Town reserves
- 1959-60: – Caersws

=== 1960s ===
- 1960-61: – Caersws
- 1961-62: – Llandrindod Wells
- 1962-63: – Caersws
- 1963-64: – Kington Town
- 1964-65: – Berriew
- 1965-66: – Kington Town
- 1966-67: – Llandrindod Wells
- 1967-68: – Welshpool
- 1968-69: – Welshpool
- 1969-70: – Barmouth & Dyffryn United

=== 1970s ===
- 1970-71: – Welshpool
- 1971-72: – Llanidloes Town
- 1972-73: – Welshpool
- 1973-74: – Llanidloes Town
- 1974-75: – Welshpool
- 1975-76: – Newtown
- 1976-77: – Welshpool
- 1977-78: – Caersws
- 1978-79: – Newtown
- 1979-80: – Welshpool

=== 1980s ===
- 1980-81: – Llanidloes Town
- 1981-82: – Newtown
- 1982-83: – Caersws
- 1983-84: – Aberystwyth Town
- 1984-85: – Aberystwyth Town
- 1985-86: – Caersws
- 1986-87: – Newtown
- 1987-88: – Newtown
- 1988-89: – Caersws
- 1989-90: – Caersws

=== 1990s ===
- 1990-91: – Morda United
- 1991-92: – Knighton Town
- 1992-93: – Machynlleth
- 1993-94: – Machynlleth
- 1994-95: – Machynlleth
- 1995-96: – Newtown reserves
- 1996-97: – Caersws reserves
- 1997-98: – Kerry
- 1998-99: – Kerry
- 1999-2000: – Carno

=== 2000s ===
- 2000-01: – Season abandoned after outbreak of Foot and mouth disease
- 2001-02: – Penrhyncoch
- 2002-03: – Penrhyncoch
- 2003-04: – Aberystwyth Town reserves
- 2004-05: – Aberystwyth Town reserves
- 2005-06: – Llanrhaeadr-ym-Mochnant
- 2006-07: – Presteigne St Andrews
- 2007-08: – Aberystwyth Town reserves
- 2008-09: – Newtown reserves
- 2009-10: – Penparcau

=== 2010s ===
- 2010-11: – Llanrhaeadr-ym-Mochnant
- 2011-12: – Rhayader Town
- 2012-13: – Llanidloes Town
- 2013-14: – Llandrindod Wells
- 2014-15: – Llanfair United
- 2015-16: – Penrhyncoch
- 2016-17: – Rhayader Town
- 2017-18: – Llanrhaeadr-ym-Mochnant
- 2018-19: – Llanfair United
- 2019-20: – Llanidloes Town

=== 2020s ===
- 2020-21:
  - East Division: – Season cancelled
  - West Division: – Season cancelled
- 2021-22:
  - East Division: – Brecon Corries
  - West Division: – Tywyn Bryncrug
- 2022-23:
  - Northern Division: – Kerry
  - Southern Division: – Radnor Valley
- 2023-24:
  - Northern Division: – Kerry
  - Southern Division: – Penparcau
- 2024-25:
  - Northern Division: – Llanrhaeadr
  - Southern Division: – Knighton Town
- 2025–26:
  - Northern Division: – Carno
  - Southern Division: – Ffostrasol Wanderers

=== Number of titles since 1950 ===
- Caersws/ reserves – 9
- Newtown/ reserves – 7
- Welshpool – 7
- 55th Royal Artillery Tonfannau – 6
- Aberystwyth Town reserves – 6
- Llanidloes Town – 6
- Knighton Town – 5
- Kerry – 4
- Llanrhaeadr-ym-Mochnant – 4
- Llandrindod Wells – 3
- Machynlleth – 3
- Penrhyncoch – 3
- Brecon Corries – 2
- Carno – 2
- Kington Town – 2
- Llanfair United – 2
- Penparcau – 2
- Rhayader Town – 2
- Barmouth & Dyffryn United – 1
- Berriew – 1
- Ffostrasol Wanderers – 1
- Morda United – 1
- Presteigne St Andrews – 1
- Radnor Valley – 1
- Tywyn Bryncrug – 1

== Central Wales League Cup - Winners ==
=== 2020s ===
- 2022–23: – Barmouth & Dyffryn United
- 2023–24: – Tregaron Turfs
- 2024–25: – Forden United
- 2025–26: –

== See also ==
- Football in Wales
- Welsh football league system
- Welsh Cup
- Welsh League Cup
- FAW Premier Cup
- List of football clubs in Wales
- List of stadiums in Wales by capacity
