= 2019–20 Welsh Cup =

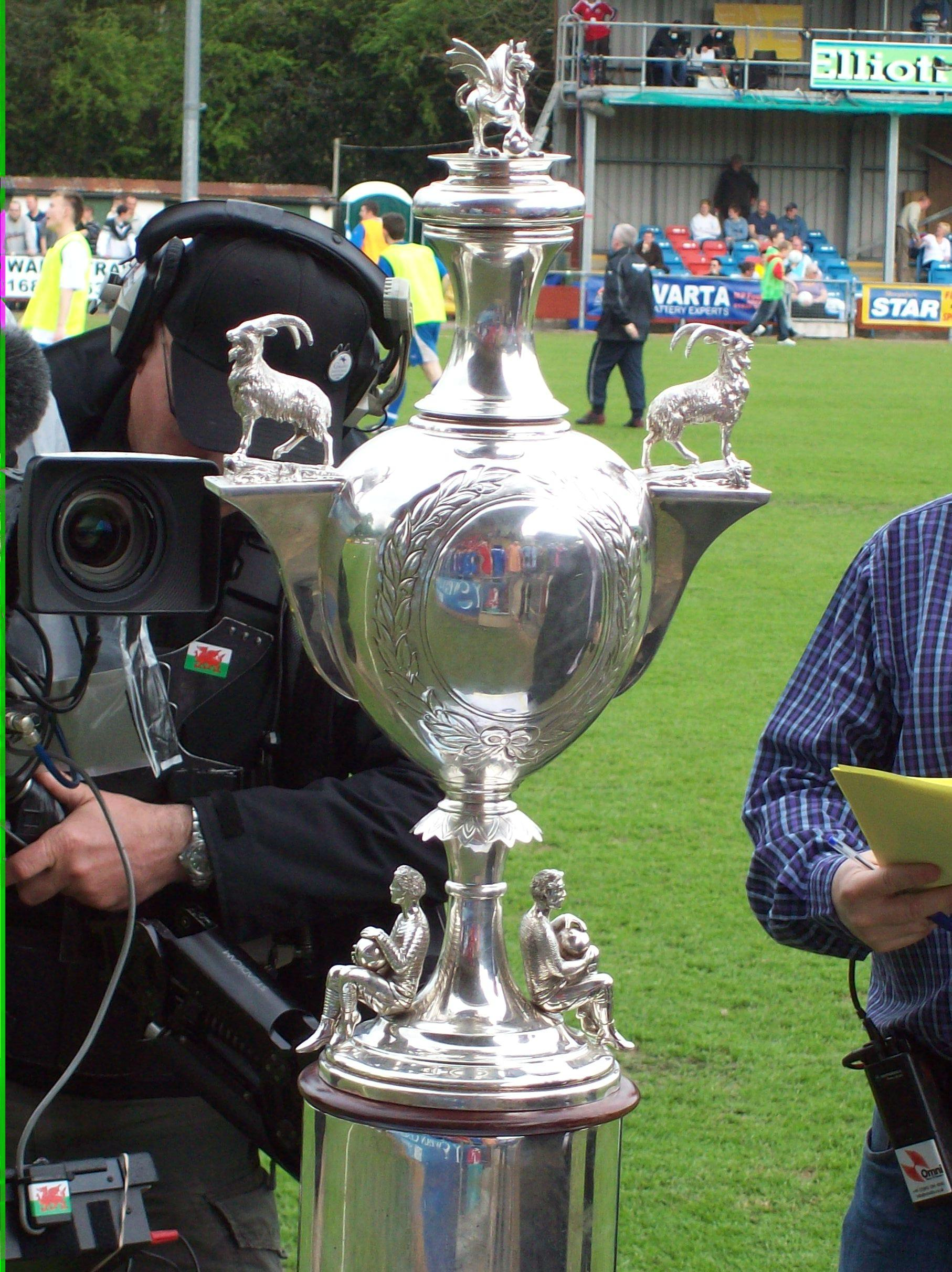
- The Welsh Cup

Tournament details
- Country: Wales
- Dates: 31 August 2019 – 3 March 2020 (Remaining matches cancelled)

Final positions
- Champions: Not awarded

The 2019–20 FAW Welsh Cup was the 133rd season of the annual knockout tournament for competitive football teams in Wales.

== First qualifying round ==
=== North ===
Team 1	Score	Team 2
31 August
CPD Aberffraw (4)	3–1	Llandudno Junction (4)
Amlwch Town (4)	3–5	Holywell Town (4)
Bangor 1876 (5)	4–1	Llandudno Athletic (5)
Brickfield Rangers (3)	2–7	New Brighton Villa (4)
Bro Goronwy (5)	4–5 (a.e.t.)	Blaenau Ffestiniog Amateur (3)
Castell Alun Colts (3)	4–0	Llangollen Town (4)
Cefn Mawr Rangers (4)	5–4	Sychdyn (5)
Coedpoeth United (4)	3–2 (a.e.t.)	Rhostyllen (4)
Gaerwen (4)	2–3 (Note: These ties were reversed from the original announced home venues.)	Llanrwst United (3)
Glan Conwy (3)	8–2	Pentraeth (4)
Llandyrnog United (3)	4–2	Lex XI (4)
Llanfairfechan Town (5)	5–3	Kinmel Bay (4)
Llannefydd (4)	7–2	Gwalchmai (4)
Mynydd Isa Spartans (4)	5–1	Llanuwchllyn (3)
Mynydd Llandegai (3)	w/o	Menai Bridge Tigers (5)
Nefyn United (5)	6–4	Llandudno Amateurs (4)
Penycae (3)	6–0	Caerwys (5)
Penmaenmawr Phoenix (4)	0–2	Mochdre Sports (4)
Rhosllanerchrugog (4)	2–12	Plas Madoc (3)
Rhydymwyn (3)	3–2 (a.e.t.)	Hawarden Rangers (4)

=== Central ===
Team 1	Score	Team 2
31 August
Abermule (4)	0–1	Barmouth & Dyffryn United (4)
Borth United (4)	6–2	Machynlleth (4)
Churchstoke (4)	1–6	Waterloo Rovers (4)
Kerry (3)	1–4	Dolgellau Athletic (4)
Llansantffraid Village (3)	0–2	Four Crosses (3)
Montgomery Town (3)	3–1	Hay St Mary's (3)
Penparcau (4)	2–1	Tywyn Bryncrug (3)
Rhayader Town (4)	2–1 (a.e.t.)	Bow Street (3)

=== South ===
Team 1	Score	Team 2
31 August
Abertillery Bluebirds (4)	4–0	Dinas Powys (3)
AFC Porth (4)	0–2 (Note: Match played at Taff's Well.)	CRC Olympic (6)
Blaenrhondda (5)	0–2 (Note: Match played at 3G Cambrian)	Ynyshir Albions (4)
Cardiff Draconians (5)	7–0	Panteg (4)
Cefn Cribwr BC (5)	3–1	Ynysygerwn (4)
Cwmbach Royal Stars (7)	2–1	Newcastle Emlyn (5)
Cwmbran Town (5)	1–2	Tredegar Town (4)
Ely Rangers (5)	3–4	Risca United (3)
Fairwater (8)	8–2	Aberystwyth Exiles (8)
FC Cwmaman (5)	3–2	Penrhiwceiber Rangers (4)
Lucas Cwmbran (6)	4–2	Ton & Gelli BGC (6)
Merthyr Saints (5)	4–0	Quar Park Rangers (8)
Newport City (4)	3–4 (a.e.t.)	Chepstow Town (4)
Newport Civil Service (5)	5–2	Caerphilly Athletic (5)
Newport Corinthians (5)	6–4	Canton Liberal (5)
Pencoed Athletic BGC (5)	2–2 (a.e.t.); 4–2 (p)	Trebanog (5)
Penlan Club (5)	3–0 (Note: Match played at Trefelin B.G.C.)	Aberdare Town (4)
Penydarren BGC (3)	4–1	Treharris Athletic Western (4)
Pill YMCA (5)	1–3	Cardiff Corinthians (6)
Pontyclun (4)	0–1	Trefelin BGC (3)
Sully Sports (5)	2–3	Caerleon (5)
Treforest (6)	1–2	Vale United (7)
Treowen Stars (4)	3–5 (a.e.t.)	AFC Llwydcoed (3)
Trethomas Bluebirds (4)	2–1	AFC Whitchurch (6)
Wattsville (5)	2–3	Clwb Cymric (6)
West End (4)	0–1	Baglan Dragons (5)

== Second qualifying round ==
=== Northeast ===
Team 1	Score	Team 2
28 September
Brymbo (3)	4–2	Rhos Aelwyd (3)
Cefn Albion (3)	4–5 (a.e.t.)	Chirk AAA (3)
Coedpoeth United (4)	4–2	Llandyrnog United (3)
Denbigh Town (3)	2–3	Mynydd Isa Spartans (4)
Greenfield (3)	4–3	Plas Madoc (3)
Holywell Town (3)	8–2	New Brighton Villa (4)
Llay Welfare (3)	2–3 (a.e.t.)	Penycae (3)
Mold Alexandra (3)	8–0	Castell Alun Colts (3)
Saltney Town (3)	1–3	Rhydymwyn (3)
5 October
Cefn Mawr Rangers (4)	1–4	FC Queens Park (3)

=== Northwest ===
Team 1	Score	Team 2
28 September
Aberffraw (4)	2–1	Glan Conwy (3)
Bangor 1876 (5)	6–2	Penrhyndeudraeth (3)
Holyhead Hotspur (3)	3–1	Holywell Town (4)
Llannefydd (4)	2–0	Llanrwst United (3)
Llanrug United (3)	5–0	Llanfairfechan Town (5)
Mochdre Sports (4)	2–4	Blaenau Ffestiniog Amateur (3)
Nefyn United (5)	7–4 (Note: These ties were reversed from the original announced home venues.)	Mynydd Llandegai (3)
Nantlle Vale (3)	2–1	Bodedern Athletic (3)
Prestatyn Sports (3)	4–2	Llandudno Albion (3)
St Asaph City (3)	1–3	Llanberis (3)

=== Central ===
Team 1	Score	Team 2
27 September
Caersws (3)	5–3	Dolgellau Athletic (4)
28 September
Barmouth & Dyffryn United (4)	0–1	Llanidloes Town (3)
Four Crosses (3)	3–1	Rhayader Town (4)
Llandrindod Wells (3)	5–2	Carno (3)
Montgomery Town (3)	2–1 (a.e.t.)	Berriew (3)
Radnor Valley (3)	2–4	Penparcau (4)
Waterloo Rovers (4)	5–4	Welshpool Town (3)
5 October
Aberaeron (3)	4–2 (a.e.t.)	Borth United (4)

=== Southeast ===
Team 1	Score	Team 2
27 September
Risca United (3)	1–2	Tredegar Town (4)
28 September
Abertillery Bluebirds (4)	3–1	Lucas Cwmbran (6)
Builth Wells (3)	1–0	Bridgend Street (3)
Chepstow Town (4)	4–2	Clwb Cymric (6)
Goytre (3)	1–1 (a.e.t.); 4–5 (p)	Caerleon (5)
Newport Corinthians (5)	0–2	Abergavenny Town (3)
Trethomas Bluebirds (4)	2–4	Croesyceiliog (3)
5 October
Aberbargoed Buds (3)	1–0	Caldicot Town (3)
Monmouth Town (3)	6–2	Newport Civil Service (5)

=== Southwest ===
Team 1	Score	Team 2
28 September
AFC Llwydcoed (3)	1–2	Cefn Cribwr BC (5)
Cardiff Draconians (5)	3–0	Pencoed Athletic BGC (5)
CRC Olympic (6)	2–3	Cardiff Corinthians (6)
Fairwater (8)	0–3	Garden Village (3)
FC Cwmaman (5)	5–1	Baglan Dragons (5)
Penydarren BGC (3)	2–3	Pontardawe Town (3)
Cwmbach Royal Stars (7)	1–2	Penlan Club (5)
Trefelin BGC (3)	3–0	Port Talbot Town (3)
Vale United (7)	1–5	Ton Pentre (3)
Ynyshir Albions (4)	3–1	Merthyr Saints (5)

== First round ==
=== North ===
Team 1	Score	Team 2
19 October
Bangor 1876 (5)	3–3 (a.e.t.); 3–2 (p)	Penycae (3)
Blaenau Ffestiniog Amateur (3)	0–2	Buckley Town (2)
Chirk AAA (4)	0–3	Llannefydd (4)
Coedpoeth United (4)	0–5	Gresford Athletic (2)
Conwy Borough (2)	1–2	Ruthin Town (2)
Corwen (2)	2–3	Colwyn Bay (2)
Flint Town United (2)	9–0	Four Crosses (3)
Greenfield (3)	3–1	Caersws (3)
Guilsfield (2)	2–1	Brymbo (3)
Holyhead Hotspur (3)	4–2	Montgomery Town (3)
Holywell Town (3)	2–3	Llandudno (2)
Llanrhaeadr (2)	1–4	Prestatyn Town (2)
Nantlle Vale (3)	2–0	Rhydymwyn (3)
Nefyn United (5)	0–2	Bangor City (2)
Prestatyn Sports (3)	2–3	FC Queens Park (3)
Rhyl (2)	2–0	Llangefni Town (2)
Waterloo Rovers (4)	1–8	Mold Alexandra (3)
29 October
Porthmadog (2)	7–0 (Note: These ties were reversed from the original announced home venues under FAW rules after the matches were postponed due to weather conditions.)	Llanberis (3)
2 November
Aberffraw (4)	0–1	Llanrug United (3)
Llanfair United (2)	5–3	Mynydd Isa Spartans (4)

=== South ===
Team 1	Score	Team 2
18 October
Cambrian BGC (2)	7–3	Ynyshir Albions (4)
19 October
Aberbargoed Buds (3)	3–1	Aberaeron (3)
Abertillery Bluebirds (4)	3–1	Penparcau (4)
Afan Lido (2)	3–1	Monmouth Town (3)
Ammanford (2)	4–1	Cardiff Draconians (5)
Briton Ferry Llansawel (2)	2–2 (a.e.t.); 3–4 (p)	Undy Athletic (2)
Builth Wells (3)	2–3	Ton Pentre (3)
Cefn Cribwr BC (5)	2–1 (a.e.t.)	Tredegar Town (4)
Chepstow Town (4)	3–2	Taffs Well (2)
Croesyceiliog (3)	2–1	Abergavenny Town (3)
Cwmbran Celtic (2)	2–3 (a.e.t.)	Pontardawe Town (3)
FC Cwmaman (5)	2–6	STM Sports (2)
Garden Village (3)	1–3	Goytre United (2)
Haverfordwest County (2)	5–3	Penlan Club (5)
Llanwit Major (2)	0–1	Llandrindod Wells (3)
Penrhyncoch (2)	2–1 (a.e.t.)	Cardiff Corinthians (6)
Pontypridd Town (2)	3–1	Caerau (Ely) (2)
Swansea University (2)	4–1	Caerleon (5)
Trefelin BGC (3)	2–2 (a.e.t.); 3–4 (p)	Llanidloes Town (3)
23 October
Llanelli Town (2)	2–1	Cwmamman United (2)

== Second round ==
The draw took place on 21 October 2019 with Cambrian & Clydach Vale joining the competition in addition to the winners from round 1.

=== North ===
Team 1	Score	Team 2
9 November 2019
Bangor 1876 (5)	0–2	Ruthin Town (2)
Bangor City (2)	0–3	Prestatyn Town (2)
Llannefydd (4)	1–5	Guilsfield (2)
Greenfield (3)	1–3	Flint Town United (2)
Holyhead Hotspur (3)	0–3	Buckley Town (2)
Porthmadog (2)	4–1	Gresford Athletic (2)
Llandudno (2)	4–1	Llanfair United (2)
Mold Alexandra (3)	8–1	Llanrug United (3)
Nantlle Vale (3)	0–1	Colwyn Bay (2)
Rhyl (2)	3–0	FC Queens Park (3)

=== South ===
Team 1	Score	Team 2
9 November 2019
Abertillery Bluebirds (4)	4–3	Llanidloes Town (3)
Afan Lido (2)	2–1	Aberbargoed Buds (3)
Ammanford (2)	3–1	Ton Pentre (3)
Goytre United (2)	6–4	Cefn Cribwr BC (5)
Haverfordwest County (2)	1–2	Cambrian & Clydach Vale (2)
Llanelli Town (2)	0–1	Penrhyncoch (2)
Pontypridd Town (2)	1–0	Llandrindod Wells (3)
Undy Athletic (2)	5–6	Swansea University (2)
16 November
Chepstow Town (4)	0–5	STM Sports (2)
Pontardawe Town (3)	6–1	Croesyceiliog (3)

== Third round ==
Clubs from the Cymru Premier joined the competition in this round. Ties to be played the weekend of 7 December 2019. The lowest ranked team still in the competition, Abertillery Bluebirds, from the fourth tier lost to the leaders of the top division, Connah's Quay Nomads. Another team from outside the top two divisions, Mold Alexandra from the third tier, lost to Welsh Cup champions, The New Saints.

Team 1	Score	Team 2
6 December 2019
Carmarthen Town (1)	0–4	Ammanford (2)
Colwyn Bay (2)	1–0 (a.e.t.)	Airbus UK Broughton (1)
7 December 2019
Abertillery Bluebirds (4)	0–3	Connah's Quay Nomads (1)
Aberystwyth Town (1)	2–1	Ruthin Town (2)
Afan Lido (2)	5–1	Llandudno (2)
Barry Town United (1)	0–1	Newtown (1)
Cardiff Metropolitan University (1)	1–0	Pontypridd Town (2)
Cefn Druids (1)	2–0	Guilsfield (2)
Flint Town United (2)	2–0	Bala Town (1)
Goytre United (2)	0–4	Caernarfon Town (1)
Penrhyncoch (2)	1–2	Prestatyn Town (2)
Pen-y-Bont (1)	a–a (Note: Match abandoned in extra time with the score at 2-2 due to serious injury to the Pen-y-Bont keeper.)	Porthmadog (2)
Pontardawe Town (3)	3–1	Buckley Town (2)
Rhyl (2)	2–0	STM Sports (2)
Swansea University (2)	3–0	Cambrian & Clydach Vale (2)
The New Saints (1)	9–0	Mold Alexandra (3)
14 December 2019
Pen-y-Bont (1)	6–1	Porthmadog (2)

== Fourth round ==
The draw was made on 9 December with the club from the lowest remaining tier Pontardawe Town, drawn away to Cymru Premier side Cefn Druids.

Team 1	Score	Team 2
24 January 2020
Ammanford (2)	0–4	Caernarfon Town (1)
Flint Town United (2)	3–2	Colwyn Bay (2)
Pen-y-Bont (1)	1–2	Cardiff Metropolitan University (1)
25 January 2020
Cefn Druids (1)	2–0	Pontardawe Town (3)
Connah's Quay Nomads (1)	8–0	Afan Lido (2)
Newtown (1)	4–1	Rhyl (2)
Swansea University (2)	0–1	Prestatyn Town (2)
The New Saints (1)	3–0	Aberystwyth Town (1)

== Quarter-finals ==
Ties were played between 28 February and 3 March.

Team 1	Score	Team 2
28 February 2020
Caernarfon Town (1)	4–0	Cefn Druids (1)
1 March 2020
Connah's Quay Nomads (1)	1–2	Cardiff Metropolitan University (1)
The New Saints (1)	6–1	Newtown (1)
3 March 2020
Flint Town United (2)	0–1	Prestatyn Town (2)

== Semi-finals ==
The remainder of the competition had been postponed by the Football Association of Wales due to the COVID-19 pandemic, until "it is safe and economically viable to resume". On 30 July 2020, the remainder of the competition was cancelled.

Team 1	Score	Team 2
TBC
Caernarfon Town (1)	Cancelled	(1) Cardiff Metropolitan University
Prestatyn Town (2)	Cancelled	(1) The New Saints

== Final ==
Cancelled.
