= 2023–24 Welsh Cup =

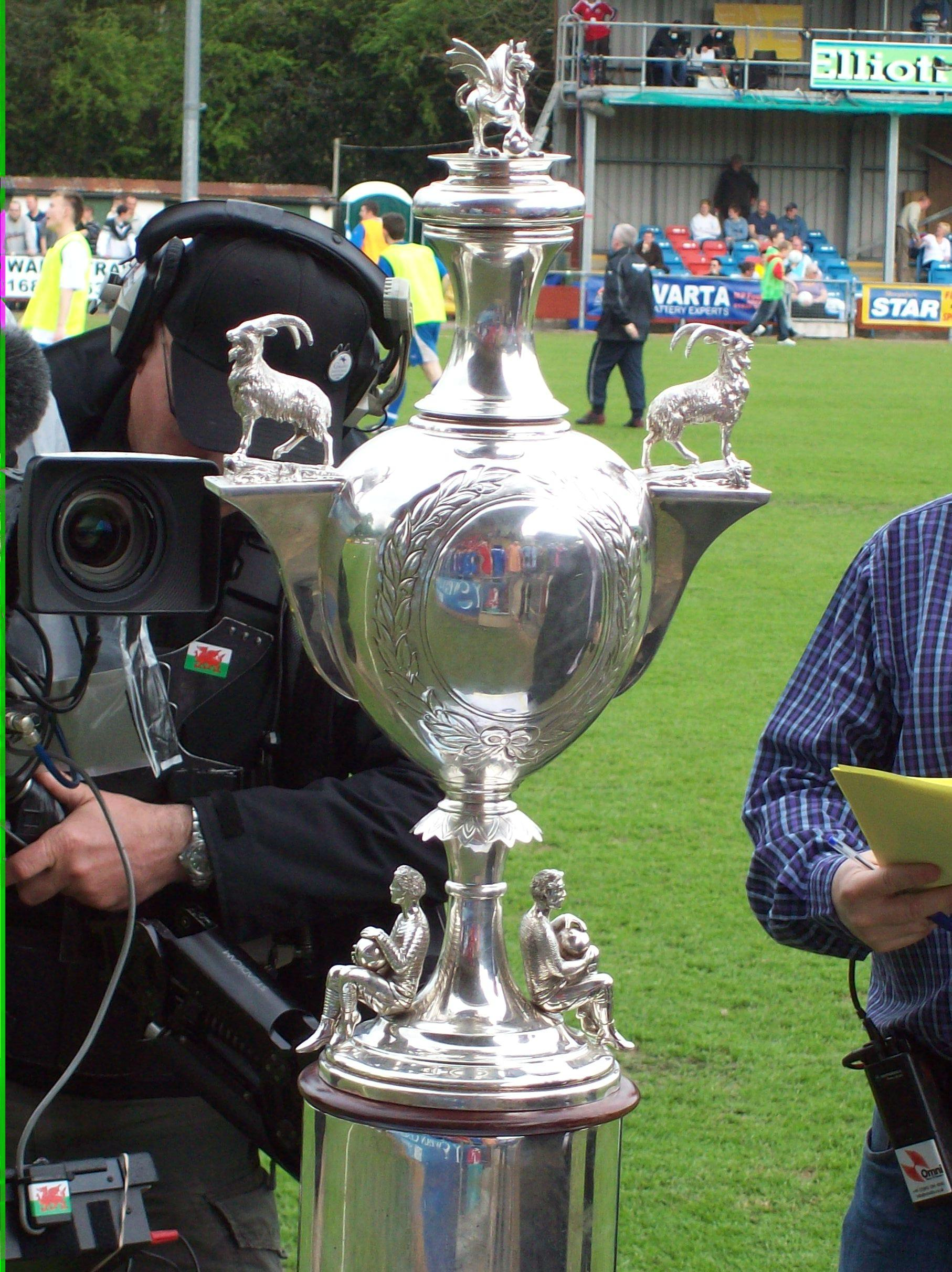
- The Welsh Cup

Tournament details
- Country: Wales

Final positions
- Champions: Connah's Quay Nomads (2nd title)
- Runners-up: The New Saints

The 2023–24 FAW Welsh Cup was the 136th season of the annual knockout tournament for competitive football teams in Wales. The winners qualified for the 2024–25 UEFA Conference League first qualifying round. The New Saints were the defending cup holders (for the third consecutive season).

Connah's Quay Nomads won the cup on 28 April 2024 (their second Welsh Cup win), defeating The New Saints 2–1 in the final. Since they qualified for the Conference League based on league position, the spot for winning the cup was passed to the third-placed team of the 2023–24 Cymru Premier.

== First qualifying round ==
Teams in Tier 3 and below entered the first qualifying round.

The following teams received byes based on league position during the previous season:

- 2023–24 Ardal NE (3): Bow Street, Cefn Albion, Llanfair United, Llanuwchllyn, and Penrhyncoch
- 2023–24 Ardal NW (3): Conwy Borough, Flint Mountain, Holyhead Hotspur, and Y Rhyl 1879
- 2023–24 Ardal SE (3): Caldicot Town, Risca United, Trethomas Bluebirds, and Undy Athletic
- 2023–24 Ardal SW (3): AFC Llwydcoed, Cefn Cribwr, Penrhiwceiber Rangers, Pontyclun, Swansea University, and Ynyshir Albions

=== Central ===
Team 1	Score	Team 2
28 July 2023
Aberaeron	0–3	Tregaron Turfs
Machynlleth	4–3	Four Crosses
29 July 2023
Berriew	0–2	Abermule
Builth Wells	3–1	Kerry
Dolgellau Athletic	1–2	Llandrindod Wells
Knighton Town	4–2	Hay St Marys
Llanilar	4–0	Llanrhaeadr
Llansantffraid Village	3–0	Welshpool Town
Montgomery Town	3–0	Ffostrasol Wanderers
Penparcau	7–0	Presteigne St. Andrews
Radnor Valley	2–0	Waterloo Rovers

=== North Central ===
Team 1	Score	Team 2
28 July 2023
St Asaph City	18–0	Rhyl Dragons
29 July 2023
Bethesda Athletic	1–4	Llanrwst United
Caer Clwyd	2–6	Rhos United
Cerrigydrudion	3–3 (3–1 p)	Llandudno Amateurs
Glan Conwy	0–2	Rhuddlan Town
Llandudno Junction	1–1 (5–4 p)	Llannefydd
Llandyrnog United	3–0	Bro Cernyw
Llansannan	2–3	Llysfaen
Meliden	0–2	Kinmel Bay
Mochdre Sports	3–2	Llanfairfechan Town
NFA	6–0	Penrhyn Bay
Penmaenmawr Phoenix	3–2	Bow
Y Glannau	4–1	Abergele

=== North East ===
Team 1	Score	Team 2
28 July 2023
Llay Welfare	12–0	Holywell United
29 July 2023
Brickfield Rangers	3–0	Saltney Town
Caerwys	1–3	Corwen
Coedpoeth United	0–1	Llangollen Town
Connah's Quay Town	1–2	Mynydd Isa Spartans
Greenfield	4–4 (7–6 p)	Castell Alun Colts
Penycae	4–3	Rhostyllen
Rhos Aelwyd	5–1	Overton Recreation
Rhydymwyn	1–4	Gronant
Yr Wyddgrug	1–11	Hawarden Rangers

=== North West ===
Team 1	Score	Team 2
29 July 2023
Aberffraw	3–4	Penrhyndeudraeth
Amlwch Town	1–0	Llanrug United
Blaenau Ffestiniog Amateur	1–3	Boded
Cemaes Bay	1–2	Talysarn Celts
Glantraeth	3–0	Gwalchmai
Holyhead Town	2–0	Bethesda Rovers
Llanberis	7–2	Bontnewydd
Llanerchymedd	0–2	Nantlle Vale
Llangoed	3–6	Llanfairpwll
Menai Bridge Tigers	9–2	Barmouth & Dyffryn United
Nefyn United	3–1	Cefni
Pwllheli	2–1	Llangefni Town
Y Felinheli	5–1	Trearddur Bay

=== South Central ===
Team 1	Score	Team 2
28 July 2023
Cardiff Corinthians	7–2	Cwrt-Y-Vil
29 July 2023
AFC Wattstown	1–1 (5–6 p)	AFC Whitchurch
Aber Valley	4–1	Trelewis Welfare
Bettws	1–5	Sully Sports
Caerphilly Athletic	3–1	Clwb Cymric
Cardiff Airport	6–0	Cwmbach Royal Stars
Cardiff Draconians	0–1	Canton
Cascade YC	3–6	Treherbert BGC
Dinas Powys	2–2 (2–4 p)	Llanrumney United
Ely Rangers	2–0	Treforest
Garw SBGC	2–2 (2–4 p)	Cardiff Bay
Llangeinor	2–1	Cardiff Bay Warriors
Llantwit Fardre	2–2 (5–4 p)	Brynna
Nelson Cavaliers	1–3	Tonyrefail BGC
St Albans	4–3	Llanrumney Athletic
Treowen Stars	9–0	St Josephs

=== South East ===
Team 1	Score	Team 2
29 July 2023
Abercarn United	3–0	Monmouth Town
Aberbargoed Buds	1–2	Pill
Brecon Corinthians	1–2	Tredegar Town
Cefn Fforest	2–0	Coed Eva Athletic
Chepstow Town	3–2	Wattsville
Cwmbrân Town	3–2	Blaenavon Blues
FC Cwmaman	11–0	FC Tredegar
Goytre	0–1	Newport City
Llanhilleth Athletic	1–2	AFC Pontymister
Lliswerry	1–1 (6–7 p)	New Inn
Machen	3–2	Pentwynmawr Athletic
Newport Civil Service	1–2	Treharris Athletic Western
Newport Corinthians	1–1 (3–4 p)	PILCS
Newport Saints	6–1	Risca Town
Rogerstone	1–3	Caerleon

=== South West ===
Team 1	Score	Team 2
28 July 2023
AFC Penrhiwceiber	3–6	Mumbles Rangers
29 July 2023
Pencoed Athletic	2–2 (6–7 p)	Porthcawl Town
AFC Porth	3–5	Glynneath Town
Clase Social	3–3 (9–10 p)	Penclawdd
Cornelly United	2–0	Ynystawe Athletic
Cwm Wanderers	0–4	Penydarren BGC
Evans & Williams	1–0	Morriston Town
Garden Village	2–1	Penlan
Merthyr Saints	0–2	Aberfan
Neath Town	2–3	Afan United
Port Talbot Town	1–2	Rockspur
South Gower	2–0	Vale United
Tata Steel United	4–2	Seven Sisters Onllwyn
West End	0–15	Ton Pentre
Ynysygerwn	2–2 (5–4 p)	Aberdare Town

== Second qualifying round ==
The second qualifying round draw was made on 4 August 2023.

=== Central ===
Team 1	Score	Team 2
18 August 2023
Machynlleth	2–3	Tregaron Turfs
Penrhyncoch	6–0	Abermule
19 August 2023
Knighton Town	1–8	Builth Wells
Llandrindod Wells	1–3	Bow Street
Llansantffraid Village	1–2	Radnor Valley
Montgomery Town	1–1 (6–5 p)	Llanilar
Penparcau	0–0 (3–1 p)	Llanfair United

=== North East ===
Team 1	Score	Team 2
19 August 2023
Cefn Albion	3–0	Hawarden Rangers
Corwen	4–3	Llay Welfare
Flint Mountain	A–A	Kinmel Bay
Greenfield	0–4	Rhos Aelwyd
Mynydd Isa Spartans	2–2 (4–5 p)	Cerrigydrudion
NFA	4–1	Llandyrnog United
Penycae	2–1	Gronant
Rhuddlan Town	0–5	Brickfield Rangers
St Asaph City	7–0	Y Glannau
Y Rhyl 1879	3–1	Llangollen Town
25 August 2023 (Replay)
Flint Mountain	9–0	Kinmel Bay

=== North West ===
Team 1	Score	Team 2
19 August 2023
Amlwch Town	2–5	Llanuwchllyn
Boded	1–2	Llanrwst United
Conwy Borough	2–1	Talysarn Celts
Glantraeth	3–0	Rhos United
Holyhead Hotspur	2–0	Llysfaen
Holyhead Town	1–1 (3–4 p)	Llandudno Junction
Menai Bridge Tigers	6–2	Penrhyndeudraeth
Mochdre Sports	1–1 (4–3 p)	Llanfairpwll
Nantlle Vale	4–2	Nefyn United
Pwllheli	2–0	Penmaenmawr Phoenix
Y Felinheli	3–0	Llanberis

=== South East ===
Team 1	Score	Team 2
18 August 2023
Cardiff Airport	7–2	Cardiff Bay
19 August 2023
Abercarn United	3–2	Caerleon
Caerphilly Athletic	3–0	Machen
Caldicot Town	2–2 (4–5 p)	Newport City
Cefn Fforest	8–0	AFC Whitchurch
Chepstow Town	3–1	Risca United
Ely Rangers	4–0	Llanrumney United
New Inn	2–4	Trethomas Bluebirds
Pill	3–1	Newport Saints
St Albans	5–3	PILCS
Sully Sports	5–0	AFC Pontymister
Tredegar Town	1–2	Cardiff Corinthians
Treowen Stars	A–A	Cwmbrân Town
Undy Athletic	3–4	Canton
26 August 2023 (Replay)
Treowen Stars	2–2 (0–2 p)	Cwmbrân Town

=== South West ===
Team 1	Score	Team 2
18 August 2023
Treherbert BGC	1–5	Mumbles Rangers
19 August 2023
Aber Valley	4–0	AFC Llwydcoed
Afan United	4–2	Llangeinor
Cefn Cribwr	1–3	Penydarren BGC
Cornelly United	0–3	Porthcawl Town
FC Cwmaman	5–4	Garden Village
Llantwit Fardre	1–1 (4–3 p)	Tata Steel United
Penclawdd	0–9	Penrhiwceiber Rangers
Pontyclun	1–1 (4–2 p)	Ynyshir Albions
Swansea University	0–6	Rockspur
Ton Pentre	5–6	South Gower
Tonyrefail BGC	2–5	Aberfan
Treharris Athletic Western	3–0	Glynneath Town
Ynysygerwn	1–2	Evans & Williams

== First round ==
The 56 second qualifying round winners and teams in Tier 2 entered the first round. The draw was made on 22 August 2023.

The following teams received byes based on league position during the previous season:

- 2023–24 Cymru North (2): Airbus UK Broughton, Buckley Town, Flint Town United, Guilsfield, Holywell Town, Llandudno, Prestatyn Town, and Ruthin Town
- 2023–24 Cymru South (2): Afan Lido, Briton Ferry Llansawel, Cambrian & Clydach Vale BGC, Carmarthen Town, Cwmbran Celtic, Llanelli Town, Llantwit Major, and Pontardawe Town

=== Central and North East ===
Team 1	Score	Team 2
16 September 2023
Brickfield Rangers	3–1	Caersws
Corwen	0–4	Bow Street
Llanidloes Town	5–4	Builth Wells
Mold Alexandra	13–1	Montgomery Town
Penparcau	0–1	Cefn Albion
Penrhyncoch	2–4	Chirk AAA
Penycae	1–4	Rhos Aelwyd
Radnor Valley	0–4	Gresford Athletic
Tregaron Turfs	2–10	Llanuwchllyn

=== North West ===
Team 1	Score	Team 2
15 September 2023
Porthmadog	3–0	Glantraeth
Holyhead Hotspur	0–4	Bangor 1876
16 September 2023
Cerrigydrudion	2–4	Denbigh Town
Llanrwst United	1–1 (4–3 p)	Conwy Borough
Mochdre Sports	0–2	Nantlle Vale
NFA	0–3	Flint Mountain
Pwllheli	1–2	Y Felinheli
St Asaph City	1–0	Llandudno Junction
Y Rhyl 1879	1–1 (6–7 p)	Menai Bridge Tigers

=== South East ===
Team 1	Score	Team 2
15 September 2023
Caerau (Ely)	3–2	Cardiff Corinthians
Newport City	0–2	Abergavenny Town
16 September 2023
Aber Valley	2–2 (3–4 p)	Cwmbrân Town
Abercarn United	4–1	St Albans
Abertillery Bluebirds	1–1 (4–1 p)	Caerphilly Athletic
Cardiff Airport	3–1	Cefn Fforest
Chepstow Town	7–0	Pill
Trethomas Bluebirds	4–1	Ely Rangers
Canton	3–1	Sully Sports

=== South West ===
Team 1	Score	Team 2
15 September 2023
Ammanford	0–0 (3–1 p)	Taff's Well
16 September 2023
Aberfan	2–1	Pontyclun
Baglan Dragons	5–1	FC Cwmaman
Goytre United	1–3	Trefelin BGC
Llantwit Fardre	3–4	Penrhiwceiber Rangers
Mumbles Rangers	1–2	Evans & Williams
Penydarren BGC	2–2 (2–3 p)	South Gower
Rockspur	4–2	Afan United
Treharris Athletic Western	1–2	Porthcawl Town

== Second round ==
The 36 first round winners, the 16 Tier 2 teams given first round byes, and the 12 teams from the 2023–24 Cymru Premier entered the second round. The draw was made on 20 September 2023.

=== North ===
Team 1	Score	Team 2
13 October 2023
Flint Mountain	3–1	Holywell Town
Bala Town	3–0	Llandudno
Llanidloes Town	1–3	Gresford Athletic
14 October 2023
Airbus UK Broughton	4–0	Rhos Aelwyd
Bow Street	2–3	Buckley Town
Chirk AAA	1–1 (3–5 p)	Porthmadog
Colwyn Bay	6–2	Llanrwst United
Connah's Quay Nomads	4–1	Caernarfon Town
Denbigh Town	0–3	Flint Town United
Nantlle Vale	2–2 (4–5 p)	Mold Alexandra
St Asaph City	0–1	Prestatyn Town
Y Felinheli	0–6	Newtown
Bangor 1876	7–1	Cefn Albion
Menai Bridge Tigers	0–2	Llanuwchllyn
18 October 2023
Ruthin Town	0–5	The New Saints
1 November 2023
Guilsfield	7–2	Brickfield Rangers

=== South ===
Team 1	Score	Team 2
13 October 2023
Llanelli Town	4–0	Llantwit Major
Trefelin BGC	2–2 (5–6 p)	Ammanford
Pontypridd United	6–0 (Note: Pontypridd United were expelled from the cup for fielding an ineligible player; Abertillery Bluebirds were reinstated.)	Abertillery Bluebirds
14 October 2023
Aberfan	0–3	Briton Ferry Llansawel
Abergavenny Town	1–3	Cardiff Airport
Aberystwyth Town	2–1	Pontardawe Town
Barry Town United	6–0	Porthcawl Town
Canton	1–1 (4–3 p)	Cambrian & Clydach Vale BGC
Carmarthen Town	2–0	Evans & Williams
Chepstow Town	4–0	Abercarn United
Cwmbran Celtic	0–3	Penybont
Haverfordwest County	0–0 (4–1 p)	Baglan Dragons
South Gower	1–1 (4–2 p)	Rockspur
Trethomas Bluebirds	6–1	Penrhiwceiber Rangers
Cardiff Metropolitan University	4–0	Cwmbrân Town
17 October 2023
Caerau (Ely)	4–1	Afan Lido

== Third round ==
The 32 second round winners entered the third round. The draw was made on 18 October 2023.

Team 1	Score	Team 2
10 November 2023
Connah's Quay Nomads	8–0	Prestatyn Town
Llanelli Town	3–3 (4–3 p)	Penybont
11 November 2023
Airbus UK Broughton	1–2	Briton Ferry Llansawel
Bangor 1876	1–1 (7–8 p)	Flint Town United
Barry Town United	1–0	Guilsfield
Caerau (Ely)	3–3 (4–3 p)	Gresford Athletic
Cardiff Metropolitan University	2–1	Mold Alexandra
Carmarthen Town	4–2	Abertillery Bluebirds
Flint Mountain	2–1	Canton
Haverfordwest County	2–0	Ammanford
Llanuwchllyn	1–2	Buckley Town
Newtown	1–1 (3–5 p)	Colwyn Bay
Porthmadog	5–1	Cardiff Airport
South Gower	2–2 (5–4 p)	Chepstow Town
The New Saints	7–0	Trethomas Bluebirds
Aberystwyth Town	0–1	Bala Town

== Fourth round ==
The 16 third round winners entered the fourth round. The draw was made on 17 November 2023.

Team 1	Score	Team 2
8 December 2023
Briton Ferry Llansawel	1–0	Llanelli Town
9 December 2023
Caerau (Ely)	1–4	Bala Town
Carmarthen Town	0–3	The New Saints
Flint Mountain	2–1	South Gower
Haverfordwest County	1–1 (2–4 p)	Cardiff Metropolitan University
Porthmadog	0–2	Buckley Town
Flint Town United	0–3	Connah's Quay Nomads
16 December 2023
Colwyn Bay	2–0	Barry Town United

== Quarter-finals ==
The eight fourth round winners entered the quarter-finals. The draw was made on 13 December 2023.

Team 1	Score	Team 2
16 February 2024
Briton Ferry Llansawel	1–5	The New Saints
17 February 2024
Bala Town	3–0	Flint Mountain
Buckley Town	1–4	Connah's Quay Nomads
Cardiff Metropolitan University	3–2	Colwyn Bay

== Semi-finals ==
The four quarter-final winners entered the semi-finals. The draw was made on 21 February 2024.

Team 1	Score	Team 2
23 March 2024
Connah's Quay Nomads	1–0	Bala Town
30 March 2024
Cardiff Metropolitan University	2–6	The New Saints

== Final ==
The final was held between the two semi-final winners.

28 April 2024	Connah's Quay Nomads	2–1	The New Saints	Newport
17:25	Franklin 30'; Williams 40'	Report	Baker 36'	Stadium: Rodney Parade; Attendance: 1,246; Referee: Bryn Markham-Jones
