= 2021–22 Ardal NE =

Ardal NE
- Season: 2021–22
- Champions: Chirk AAA
- Promoted: Chirk AAA
- Relegated: Carno; Kerry; Four Crosses

The 2021–22 Ardal NE season (also known as the 2021–22 Lock Stock Ardal NE season for sponsorship reasons) was the first season of the new third-tier northern region football in Welsh football pyramid, part of the Ardal Leagues, after the cancellation of the previous season due to the COVID-19 pandemic in Wales.

== Teams ==
The league was made up of 16 teams competing for one automatic promotion place to Cymru North, whilst the second-placed team qualified for a play-off with the second-placed team of Ardal NW. Three teams were relegated to Tier 4.

=== Team changes ===
==== To Ardal NE ====
Promoted from Mid Wales Football League Division 2

- Dolgellau Athletic

==== From Ardal NE ====
Demoted to Mid Wales Football League East Division

- Montgomery Town

=== Stadia and locations ===
Locations of teams in the 2021–22 Ardal NE

Team	Location	Home Ground	Capacity
Berriew	Berriew	Berriew Recreational Ground	1,000
Bow Street	Rhydypennau	Cae Piod	1,000
Caersws	Caersws	Recreation Ground	3,500
Carno	Carno	Tybrith	400
Cefn Albion	Rhosymedre	The Rock	3,000
Chirk AAA	Chirk	Holyhead Road	1,000
Corwen	Corwen	War Memorial Park	1,000
Dolgellau Athletic	Dolgellau	Cae Marian	2,000
Four Crosses	Four Crosses	Foxen Manor	1,000
Kerry	Kerry	Dolforgan Park	1,000
Llanfair United	Llanfair Caereinion	Mount Field	2,000
Machynlleth	Machynlleth	Plas Grounds	1,000
Penparcau	Penparcau	Min-y-Ddol	1,000
Penycae	Pen-y-cae	The SoccerMillion Riverside Arena	2,000
Rhos Aelwyd	Rhosllanerchrugog	Ponciau Park	1,000
Welshpool Town	Welshpool	Maes y Dre Recreation Ground	3,000

Source: Ardal NE Ground Information

== League table ==
Pos	Team	Pld	W	D	L	GF	GA	GD	Pts	Promotion, qualification or relegation
1	Chirk AAA (C, P)	30	25	1	4	104	22	+82	76	Promotion to Cymru North
2	Caersws	30	23	4	3	100	37	+63	73	Qualification for the Ardal Northern play-off
3	Cefn Albion	30	22	4	4	114	35	+79	70	
4	Llanfair United	30	21	4	5	104	43	+61	67	
5	Bow Street	30	17	4	9	64	43	+21	55	
6	Berriew	30	16	4	10	95	56	+39	52	Club withdrew
7	Rhos Aelwyd	30	13	5	12	69	53	+16	44	
8	Dolgellau Athletic	30	13	4	13	51	57	−6	43	
9	Penparcau	30	13	2	15	58	67	−9	41	Club withdrew
10	Welshpool Town	30	12	5	13	65	81	−16	41	
11	Corwen	30	10	2	18	68	90	−22	29 (Note: Corwen were deducted three points.)	
12	Penycae	30	7	6	17	54	78	−24	27	
13	Machynlleth	30	8	3	19	48	85	−37	27	Club withdrew
14	Carno (R)	30	6	4	20	45	101	−56	22	Relegation to Tier 4
15	Kerry (R)	30	5	2	23	32	144	−112	17	Relegation to Tier 4
16	Four Crosses (R)	30	0	4	26	26	105	−79	−5 (Note: Four Crosses were deducted nine points.)	Relegation to Tier 4

Source: Ardal NE
Rules for classification: 1) Points; 2) Goal difference; 3) Goals scored; 4) Matches won; 5) Play-off.
(C) Champions; (P) Promoted; (R) Relegated

== Results ==
Home \ Away	BER	BOW	CAE	CNO	CFN	CHI	COR	DOL	FCR	KER	LFU	MAC	PPC	PYC	RHO	WEL
Berriew	—	1–1	1–1	4–1	2–5	0–2	7–0	4–1	5–0	5–0	3–3	4–0	5–0	3–1	2–0	3–4
Bow Street	1–4	—	1–1	4–1	3–2	1–2	0–3	1–1	1–0	3–1	2–1	0–1	5–1	4–1	1–1	4–2
Caersws	4–3	3–2	—	8–2	2–2	2–1	5–2	0–2	9–0	3–0	1–3	3–2	7–1	2–0	3–0	5–0
Carno	2–6	0–2	2–3	—	0–4	0–2	2–4	3–4	3–2	3–3	1–3	2–0	0–4	1–3	2–2	3–3
Cefn Albion	3–0	4–1	1–1	4–0	—	0–2	5–2	4–0	4–1	13–0	4–2	8–0	6–0	4–0	1–1	7–1
Chirk AAA	4–0	3–0	2–3	4–0	2–1	—	3–0	4–0	6–1	14–0	2–0	4–0	4–0	2–2	4–1	4–0
Corwen	5–4	1–5	1–4	1–2	2–3	0–5	—	2–4	1–1	4–1	1–4	4–4	4–0	2–3	2–5	5–3
Dolgellau Athletic	2–2	2–1	3–6	4–0	0–1	0–2	3–1	—	1–1	1–2	1–1	4–1	3–2	2–1	1–4	1–2
Four Crosses	2–4	0–3	2–8	0–2	0–3	1–2	1–3	0–2	—	0–2	2–4	1–5	1–6	1–1	1–2	0–2
Kerry	1–6	0–4	1–2	0–4	2–4	0–4	0–5	2–5	3–2	—	1–9	3–2	0–6	1–1	0–8	2–5
Llanfair United	5–3	1–2	2–1	5–0	3–2	5–2	2–0	1–2	9–0	5–0	—	5–0	4–1	3–2	2–1	5–0
Machynlleth	3–1	0–3	0–1	2–4	2–6	0–6	1–5	1–0	4–2	3–0	2–4	—	1–3	1–2	1–1	4–2
Penparcau	2–0	1–3	0–2	6–0	1–1	1–3	2–0	1–0	3–1	7–0	2–2	1–4	—	1–0	2–0	0–3
Penycae	2–3	3–4	1–3	3–3	1–4	1–6	1–4	1–2	2–1	7–1	3–3	3–2	1–4	—	1–3	3–3
Rhos Aelwyd	0–5	1–2	0–5	4–2	4–5	2–1	6–1	4–0	3–0	6–0	2–3	1–0	3–0	1–2	—	1–2
Welshpool Town	1–5	1–0	0–2	7–0	0–3	1–2	4–3	2–0	2–2	3–6	0–5	2–2	4–0	4–2	2–2	—

Source: Ardal NE Match Fixtures
Legend: Blue = home team win; Yellow = draw; Red = away team win.
