= 2023–24 Ardal NE =

Ardal NE
- Season: 2023–24
- Champions: Penrhyncoch
- Promoted: Penrhyncoch
- Relegated: Llanrhaeadr; Welshpool Town

The 2023–24 Ardal NE season (also known as the 2023–24 Lock Stock Ardal NE season for sponsorship reasons), was the third season of the new third-tier northern region football in Welsh football pyramid, part of the Ardal Leagues.

The winners (Penrhyncoch) were promoted to the 2024–25 Cymru North. The third-placed team (Llanuwchllyn) qualified for the Ardal Northern play-off, losing and remaining in the league. The bottom two teams (Llanrhaeadr and Welshpool Town) were relegated to Tier 4.

== Teams ==
The league was made up of fifteen teams; twelve teams remaining from the previous season, two teams promoted from Tier 4, and one team relegated from the 2022–23 Cymru North. On 31 July 2023, Barmouth & Dyffryn United withdrew from the league, reducing the number of teams by one.

The teams promoted from Tier 4 were Llansantffraid Village from the Central Wales Football League Northern Division and Radnor Valley from the Central Wales Football League Southern Division (replacing the relegated Ardal NE teams of Corwen and Rhayader Town). The team relegated from the Cymru North was Penrhyncoch (replacing the promoted Ardal NE team of Caersws).

=== Stadia and locations ===
Locations of teams in the 2023–24 Ardal NE

Team	Location	Home Ground	Capacity
Bow Street	Rhydypennau	Cae Piod	1,000
Builth Wells	Builth Wells	Lant Fields	1,000
Cefn Albion	Rhosymedre	The Rock	3,000
Dolgellau Athletic	Dolgellau	Cae Marian	2,000
Llandrindod Wells	Llandrindod Wells	Lant Avenue Broadway	1,000
Llanfair United	Llanfair Caereinion	Mount Field	2,000
Llangollen Town	Llangollen	Tower Fields	1,100
Llanrhaeadr	Llanrhaeadr-ym-Mochnant	The Recreation Field	1,000
Llansantffraid Village	Llansantffraid-ym-Mechain	Recreation Ground	2,000
Llanuwchllyn	Bala	Maes Tegid	3,000
Penrhyncoch	Penrhyn-coch	Cae Baker	950
Penycae	Pen-y-cae	The SoccerMillion Riverside Arena	2,000
Radnor Valley	New Radnor	The Bypass	
Rhos Aelwyd	Rhosllanerchrugog	Ponciau Park	1,000
Welshpool Town	Welshpool	Maes y Dre	3,000

Source: Ardal NE Ground Information

== Personnel ==
Team	Head coach	Captain
Bow Street	(Wales) Llyr Hughes	(Wales) Steffan Richards
Builth Wells	(Wales) Stuart Turpin	(Wales) Chris Roff
Cefn Albion	(Wales) Ian Andrews	(Wales) Nathan Williams
Dolgellau Athletic	(Wales) Owain Williams	(Wales) Jonathan Sutton
Llandrindod Wells	(Wales) Gareth Jones	(Wales) Shaun Nicholls
Llanfair United	(England) Lawrence WIlson	(Wales) Ben Jones
Llangollen Town	(Wales) Luke Maybury	(Wales) Kristian Jones
Llanrheadr	(Wales) Mike Barton	(Wales) Joe Vaughan
Llansantffraid Village		
Llanuwchllyn	(Wales) Sion Tudor	(Wales) Iolo Jones
Penrhyncoch		
Penycae	(England) Daniel Richards	(Wales) Adam Peters
Radnor Valley		
Rhos Aelwyd	(Wales) Aled Parry	(Wales) Aled Robertson
Welshpool Town	(Wales) Russell Cadwallader	(England) Ricky Litchfield

== League table ==
Pos	Team	Pld	W	D	L	GF	GA	GD	Pts	Promotion, qualification or relegation
1	Penrhyncoch (C, P)	28	21	4	3	83	21	+62	67	Promotion to Cymru North
2	Bow Street	28	20	5	3	90	29	+61	65	
3	Llanuwchllyn	28	19	6	3	74	32	+42	63	Qualification for the Ardal Northern play-off (Note: Bow Street were refused a promotion license; the Ardal Northern play-off spot was passed to the third-placed team.)
4	Builth Wells	28	15	6	7	52	37	+15	51	
5	Dolgellau Athletic	28	14	5	9	60	48	+12	47	
6	Radnor Valley	28	14	4	10	61	57	+4	46	
7	Cefn Albion	28	13	3	12	61	55	+6	39	
8	Llandrindod Wells	28	10	9	9	40	43	−3	39	
9	Llangollen Town	28	10	4	14	49	61	−12	34	
10	Llansantffraid Village	28	9	5	14	53	60	−7	32	
11	Rhos Aelwyd	28	8	7	13	40	44	−4	31	
12	Llanfair United	28	9	4	15	39	63	−24	31	
13	Penycae	28	6	4	18	48	72	−24	22	
14	Llanrhaeadr (R)	28	4	6	18	35	69	−34	15	Relegation to Tier 4
15	Welshpool Town (R)	28	0	4	24	16	110	−94	4	Relegation to Tier 4

Source: Ardal Northern
Rules for classification: 1) Points; 2) Goal difference; 3) Goals scored; 4) Matches won; 5) Play-off.
(C) Champions; (P) Promoted; (R) Relegated

== Results ==
Home \ Away	BOW	BUI	CFN	DOL	LDW	LFU	LGN	LRH	LSF	LNW	PRC	PYC	RNV	RHO	WEL
Bow Street	—	3–1	2–0	4–0	1–1	5–0	5–0	3–0	1–0	3–3	2–2	5–1	6–2	2–0	7–0
Builth Wells	0–3	—	2–1	2–0	1–2	4–1	2–2	4–1	1–1	1–1	1–0	2–1	2–1	1–1	5–0
Cefn Albion	1–3	2–3	—	2–3	3–1	3–3	1–1	0–0	3–0	1–6	1–2	2–1	3–1	1–2	4–1
Dolgellau Athletic	1–3	4–0	2–4	—	3–1	1–2	3–0	4–1	3–0	0–2	0–3	5–2	3–1	1–0	4–1
Llandrindod Wells	3–4	2–2	5–1	3–3	—	0–0	1–0	1–1	0–2	0–1	0–0	1–0	2–2	2–1	0–0
Llanfair United	0–3	0–2	0–2	2–2	0–1	—	1–2	4–3	2–2	0–2	2–4	4–1	3–2	2–1	1–0
Llangollen Town	3–3	1–2	3–4	1–2	0–2	4–2	—	3–0	0–2	0–2	1–2	4–2	1–3	2–1	8–0
Llanrhaeadr	1–4	0–1	4–1	0–3	0–0	1–0	1–2	—	1–6	2–4	0–3	1–1	0–7	2–2	6–1
Llansantffraid Village	0–6	1–4	0–4	2–3	6–0	0–1	8–0	3–2	—	0–2	1–5	2–0	1–1	2–2	6–2
Llanuwchllyn	3–2	2–1	3–1	0–2	1–3	11–2	0–0	3–1	2–2	—	3–0	3–1	3–1	3–2	4–0
Penrhyncoch	1–1	3–0	0–2	3–1	4–1	2–0	6–0	3–0	5–0	1–0	—	6–2	4–1	3–0	5–0
Penycae	2–3	0–1	3–7	3–3	3–1	3–1	2–3	0–0	4–2	1–3	1–3	—	0–2	3–1	4–1
Radnor Valley	1–0	0–4	4–0	3–3	2–1	1–0	0–3	2–1	3–2	2–2	1–7	4–3	—	3–1	4–1
Rhos Aelwyd	3–1	2–1	0–2	2–0	1–2	1–4	3–1	4–0	2–0	2–2	0–0	1–1	1–2	—	1–1
Welshpool Town	0–5	2–2	0–5	1–1	1–3	0–2	1–4	0–6	1–2	1–3	0–6	1–3	0–5	0–3	—

Source: Ardal Northern
Legend: Blue = home team win; Yellow = draw; Red = away team win.
