= 2020–21 Ardal NE =

Ardal NE
- Season: 2020–21
- Champions: None
- Promoted: None
- Relegated: None

The 2020–21 Ardal NE season (also known as the 2020–21 Lock Stock Ardal NE season for sponsorship reasons) was to be the first season of the new third-tier northern region football in Welsh football pyramid, part of the Ardal Leagues. Teams were to play each other twice on a home and away basis.

Due to the COVID-19 pandemic in Wales, the Football Association of Wales cancelled the 2020–21 seasons of the Ardal Leagues and below.

== Teams ==
Normally, the league is made up of 16 teams competing for one automatic promotion place to Cymru North, whilst the second place team goes into a play-off with the second place team of Ardal NW. Three teams are relegated to Tier 4.

=== Team changes ===
==== To Ardal NE ====
From Mid Wales Football League Division 1

- Bow Street
- Caersws
- Welshpool Town
- Berriew
- Montgomery Town
- Kerry
- Carno
- Four Crosses

Promoted from Mid Wales Football League Division 2

- Penparcau
- Machynlleth

From Welsh National League Premier Division

- Cefn Albion
- Penycae
- Rhos Aelwyd
- Chirk AAA

Relegated from Cymru North

- Corwen
- Llanfair United

=== Stadia and locations ===
Locations of teams in the 2020–21 Ardal NE

Team	Location	Home Ground	Capacity
Berriew	Berriew	Berriew Recreational Ground	1,000
Bow Street	Rhydypennau	Cae Piod	1,000
Caersws	Caersws	Recreation Ground	3,500
Carno	Carno	Tybrith	400
Cefn Albion	Rhosymedre	The Rock	3,000
Chirk AAA	Chirk	Holyhead Road	1,000
Corwen	Corwen	War Memorial Park	1,000
Four Crosses	Four Crosses	Foxen Manor	1,000
Kerry	Kerry	Dolforgan Park	1,000
Llanfair United	Llanfair Caereinion	Mount Field	2,000
Machynlleth	Machynlleth	Plas Grounds	1,000
Montgomery Town	Montgomery	Cwstanymur	1,000
Penparcau	Penparcau	Min-y-Ddol	1,000
Penycae	Pen-y-cae	The SoccerMillion Riverside Arena	2,000
Rhos Aelwyd	Rhosllanerchrugog	Ponciau Park	1,000
Welshpool Town	Welshpool	Maes y Dre Recreation Ground	3,000

Source: Ardal NE Ground Information

== Season overview ==
On 28 July 2020, the Football Association of Wales announced that this league would be named Ardal NE and would be sponsored by Lock Stock Self Storage. Ardal NE & Ardal NW divisions will make up the Ardal Northern region of Tier 3 in the men's Welsh domestic game.
Since anti-COVID-19 restrictions were put in place by FAW, clubs could have trained in groups of 15 and contact training was allowed at all-levels of football. However, competitive and exhibition matches were still not allowed to take place.

On 26 March 2021, Montgomery Town announced that they would be withdrawing from the Ardal League. The National Game Board will now be tasked with whether to fill the vacancy will be filled for the 2021/22 season, following the gap in the league.

== League table ==
Pos	Team	Pld	W	D	L	GF	GA	GD	Pts	Promotion, qualification or relegation
1	Berriew	0	0	0	0	0	0	0	0	Promoted to Cymru North
2	Bow Street	0	0	0	0	0	0	0	0	Qualified for the Ardal Northern Play-Off
3	Caersws	0	0	0	0	0	0	0	0	
4	Carno	0	0	0	0	0	0	0	0	
5	Cefn Albion	0	0	0	0	0	0	0	0	
6	Chirk AAA	0	0	0	0	0	0	0	0	
7	Corwen	0	0	0	0	0	0	0	0	
8	Four Crosses	0	0	0	0	0	0	0	0	
9	Kerry	0	0	0	0	0	0	0	0	
10	Llanfair United	0	0	0	0	0	0	0	0	
11	Machynlleth	0	0	0	0	0	0	0	0	
12	Montgomery Town	0	0	0	0	0	0	0	0	
13	Penparcau	0	0	0	0	0	0	0	0	
14	Penycae	0	0	0	0	0	0	0	0	Relegated to Tier 4 Leagues
15	Rhos Aelwyd	0	0	0	0	0	0	0	0	Relegated to Tier 4 Leagues
16	Welshpool Town	0	0	0	0	0	0	0	0	Relegated to Tier 4 Leagues

Source: Ardal NE
Rules for classification: 1) Points; 2) Goal difference; 3) Goals scored; 4) Matches won; 5) Play-off.

== Results ==
Home \ Away	BER	BOW	CAE	CNO	CFN	CHI	COR	FCR	KER	LFU	MAC	MNT	PPC	PYC	RHO	WEL
Berriew	—															
Bow Street		—														
Caersws			—													
Carno				—												
Cefn Albion					—											
Chirk AAA						—										
Corwen							—									
Four Crosses								—								
Kerry									—							
Llanfair United										—						
Machynlleth											—					
Montgomery Town												—				
Penparcau													—			
Penycae														—		
Rhos Aelwyd															—	
Welshpool Town																—

Source: Ardal NE Match Fixtures
Legend: Blue = home team win; Yellow = draw; Red = away team win.
