= C.P.D. Caer Clwyd =

Football club based in Denbighshire

Caer Clwyd
- Full name: Clwb Pêl-Droed Caer Clwyd
- Founded: 2020
- Dissolved: 2023
- Ground: Myddelton College
- 2023–24: North Wales Coast East Division One, (resigned from league)
Home colours	Away colours

Clwb Pêl-Droed Caer Clwyd was a Welsh football club based in Denbigh, Denbighshire. The team played in the North Wales Coast East Football League Division One, at the fifth tier of the Welsh football league system, from its founding in 2020 until it folded in November 2023.

== History ==
The club was founded in 2020, entering the North Wales Coast East Football League Division One. For their first season they were set to be sponsored by Myddelton College on both their home and away kits.

As the 2020–21 season was cancelled due to the COVID-19 pandemic, their first match was on 3 July 2021, a 3–3 draw against Llandudno Amateurs. They finished 9th in their first season.

In the 2022–23 Welsh Cup they beat Rhyl Dragons 3–2 before losing 5–2 to Y Glannau in the second qualifying round. They finished 7th in the league that season.

They again entered the Welsh Cup in 2023–24, losing in the first qualifying round to Rhos United.

In 2023–24 they had started the season with 10 points from their first 4 games, as well as beating fourth-tier Glan Conwy in the FAW Trophy. They were then asked to leave their home ground in September 2023, and were unable to find an alternative ground. The team lost every game until they resigned from the league in November and folded.
