= Tregaron Turfs F.C. =

Association football club in Wales

Tregaron Turfs
- Full name: Tregaron Turfs Football Club
- Founded: 1971
- Ground: School Field
- League: Central Wales Southern Division
- 2024–25: Central Wales Southern Division, 3rd of 17
Home colours	Away colours

Tregaron Turfs Football Club is a Welsh football team based in Tregaron, Ceredigion, Wales. The team play in the Central Wales Southern Division.

== History ==
A team known as the Caron Turfs is recorded from shortly after World War I, with a match against Ystrad Meurig played on 6 December 1919. By the 1930s the team was referred to as Tregaron Turfs.

Tregaron appeared in the 1947–48 Welsh Cup. They won the 1955–56 Aberystwyth League and 1958–59 Cardiganshire League titles.

The current Tregaron Turfs club was founded in 1971.

The club played in the Aberystwyth League before the 2010–11 season when they joined the newly created Mid Wales Football League Division Two. They only stayed in the league for two seasons.

The club then returned to the Aberystwyth League. They were Division One champions in their first season back, finishing one point ahead of Borth United. In 2018–19 they were runners-up to Llanilar in the Aberystwyth League Cup, and in the following season they regained the Aberystwyth League title.

In July 2020 the club was announced as one of the tier 4 clubs in the restructured West Division of the Mid Wales Football League. For the 2020–21 season the club was set to support the Premier League's No Room for Racism campaign by wearing the logo on their kit. The chairman and coach Dilwyn Daniel said he believed they need to "raise awareness" and "make it known that this issue is everywhere", and that the club had been affected by verbal racism towards one of their players a few years prior.

In 2022 league reorganisation meant they were moved into the newly-formed Southern Division. In 2022–23 they were runners-up in the J. Emrys Morgan Cup, losing 2–1 to Barmouth & Dyffryn United in the final. In the following season they were Central Wales League Cup winners, coming back from 2–0 down to win 3–2 against Kerry in the final.

== Reserve team ==
Tregaron Turfs has a reserve team which played in the Aberystwyth League. Dafydd Iolo managed the team for three years until 2023. In August 2023, Alun Davies was named as their new manager, with Caradog Daniel as his assistant. For the 2024–25 season they left the Aberystwyth League to play in the Ceredigion League, where they won Division Three in their first season.

== Women's team ==
Tregaron Turfs have a women's team. After winning six Ceredigion Ladies League titles and seven Ceredigion League Cups, they joined the new Central Wales North Women's League in 2025.

== Honours ==
- Aberystwyth League Division One – Champions (3): 1955–56; 2012–13; 2019–20
- Ceredigion League Division One – Champions (1): 1958–59
- Ceredigion League Division Three – Champions: 2024–25 (reserves)
- J. Emrys Morgan Cup – Runners-up: 2022–23
- Central Wales League Cup – Winners: 2023–24
- Aberystwyth League Cup – Runners-up: 2018–19
