= Aberystwyth University F.C. =

Association football club in Wales

Aberystwyth University
- Full name: Aberystwyth University Football Club
- Nickname: The Students
- Founded: 1904
- Ground: The Vicarage Playing Fields; Aberystwyth
- 2024–25: Central Wales Southern Division, 13th of 17 (resigned after end of season)
- Website: http://www.aberystwythuniversityfc.co.uk/
Home colours	Away colours

Aberystwyth University Football Club (Welsh: Clwb Pêl-droed Prifysgol Aberystwyth) is a football club based in Aberystwyth, Wales. They last played in the Central Wales Football League but withdrew ahead of the 2025–26 season.

The club represent the Students Union of Aberystwyth University – the Aberystwyth Guild of Students.

The club's crest are those of the university. The home colours are Red shirts with black shorts and red socks.

The club enjoys friendly rivalries with fellow town-dwellers Penparcau F.C., Bow Street F.C. of Rhydypennau, and Aberystwyth Town who play in the Welsh Premier League.

== Players ==
As of 25 November 2024

=== Current squad ===
Note: Flags indicate national team as defined under FIFA eligibility rules; some limited exceptions apply. Players may hold more than one non-FIFA nationality.

No.	Pos.	Nation	Player
—	GK	WAL	Oli Edwards
—	GK	ENG	Jack Jennings
—	DF	WAL	Evan Street
—	DF	ENG	Jack Scott
—	DF	GHA	Kwame Koramoah
—	DF	WAL	Javen Low
—	DF	ENG	James Barlow
—	DF	ENG	Mitchell Asbrery
—	DF	ENG	Jonny Mead
—	DF	WAL	Jack Trotman
—	DF	WAL	Danny Reynolds
—	DF	ENG	Henry Thompson
—	MF	WAL	Ben Pettit
—	MF	WAL	Ethan Pask
—	MF	WAL	Josh Evans

No.	Pos.	Nation	Player
—	MF	WAL	Luke Westeng
—	MF	ENG	Ernie Andrews
—	MF	ENG	Will O'Rourke
—	MF	ENG	Mattie Strong
—	MF	JPN	Hayato Inoue
—	FW	WAL	Joshua O'Leary
—	FW	NGA	Salam Abdullahi
—	FW	ENG	Fred Harris
—	FW	ENG	Daniel Read
—	FW	ENG	Jamie Cattermole
—	FW	ENG	Joel O'Malley
—	FW	ENG	Alex Parker (captain)
—	FW	KEN	James Mwenda

== Varsity Results ==
Year	Scoreline	Goal Scorers	Result
2025-26	AUFC 2 - 1 Bangor	Alex Parker, Evan Street	W
2024-25	Bangor 3 - 0 AUFC	N/A	L
2023-24	AUFC 3 - 1 Bangor	Will Ludlow x2, Own Goal	W
2022-23	Bangor 0 - 1 AUFC	Jamie Jones	W
2021-22	AUFC 1 - 0 Bangor	Kieran Booker	W
2020-21*	Bangor P - P AUFC	POSTPONED	P
2019-20*	AUFC P - P Bangor	POSTPONED	P
2018-19	AUFC 0 - 6 Bangor	N/A	L

* Cancelled due to the COVID pandemic

== Committee Members ==
Position	Name
President	(Wales) Oliver Edwards
First Team Captain	(England) Will O'Rourke
Secretary	(Wales) Jack Trotman
Treasurer	(England) Jamie Cattermole
Club Development Officer	(England) Ernie Andrews
Welsh Language	(Wales) Evan Street
Media Officer	(Wales) Javen Low
Wellbeing Officer	(Wales) Evan Street
Social Secretaries	(England) Daniel Read (Wales) Ben Pettit

== Aber D'or Winners ==
Year	Winner
2022-23	(England) Will Ludlow
2023-24	(England) Will Ludlow
2024-25	(Wales) Kieran Booker
2025-26	(Wales) Evan Street

== Clubman of the Year Winners ==
Year	Winner
2015-16	Ben Bell
2016-17	Tom Francis
2017-18	Jordan Roberts
2018-19	Calum Simons
2019-20	Rob Townsend
2020-21	Daniel Clemson
2021-22	Harri Jones
2022-23	Adam Carey
2023-24	Jonny Mead
2024-25	Jonny Mead
2025-26	Jack Jennings
