= Aberystwyth League =

Aberystwyth & District Football League
- Founded: 1934
- Country: Wales
- Divisions: 1
- Number of clubs: 11
- Level on pyramid: 5
- Promotion to: Central Wales Football League
- Current champions: Penparcau (2025–26)
- Most championships: Penparcau (12 titles)

The Aberystwyth & District Football League (known as the Cynghrair Cambrian Tyres Aberystwyth League) is a football league in Mid Wales, sitting at the fifth level of the Welsh football league system.

The league hosts several cup competitions: J. Emrys Morgan Cup, Dai 'Dynamo' Davies Cup, League Cup, and Len & Julie Newman Memorial Trophy.

Teams promoted from Division One can enter the Central Wales Football League if standards and facilities fell into line with the regulations of the Mid Wales League.

== Member clubs for the 2026–27 season ==
=== Division One ===
- Aberystwyth Town Ceidwaid Aberystwyth
- Barmouth & Dyffryn United (development)
- Bont
- Borth United
- Corris United
- Dolgellau AA (reserves)
- Llanilar (reserves)
- Machynlleth (reserves)
- Padarn United
- Talybont
- Tywyn & Bryncrug (reserves)

== League champions - Top division ==
Information sourced from the Welsh Soccer Archive unless referenced.

=== 1930s ===
- 1934–35: Aberayron
- 1935–36: Trefechain

=== 1940s ===
- 1946–47: Season competition declared void
- 1947–48: Bont
- 1948–49: Aberystwyth Rovers
- 1949–50: Aberystwyth Rovers

=== 1950s ===
- 1950–51: Aberayron
- 1951–52: Trefechain
- 1952–53: Trefechain
- 1953–54: Aberystwyth Rovers
- 1954–55: Aberayron
- 1955–56: Tregaron Turfs
- 1956–57: University College of Wales reserves
- 1957–58: YMCA
- 1958–59:
- 1959–60: University College of Wales reserves

=== 1960s ===
- 1960–61: Dewi Stars
- 1961–62: University College of Wales reserves
- 1962–63: University College of Wales reserves
- 1963–64: University College of Wales reserves
- 1964–65: Bont
- 1965–66: Penparcau
- 1966–67: Bont
- 1967–68: Bont
- 1968–69: Penparcau
- 1969–70: Bont

=== 1970s ===
- 1970–71: Bont
- 1971–72: Penrhyncoch
- 1972–73: Phoenix
- 1973–74: Llanilar
- 1974–75: Penrhyncoch
- 1975–76: Penrhyncoch
- 1976–77: Penrhyncoch
- 1977–78: Penrhyncoch
- 1978–79: Aber Athletics Club
- 1979–80: Bryncrug

=== 1980s ===
- 1980–81: Dolgellau Athletic
- 1981–82: Barmouth & Dyffryn United
- 1982–83: Bow Street
- 1983–84: Aberystwyth Town reserves
- 1984–85: Bryncrug
- 1985–86: Penparcau
- 1986–87: Bryncrug
- 1987–88: Padarn United
- 1988–89: Penparcau
- 1989–90: Penparcau

=== 1990s ===
- 1990–91: Penparcau
- 1991–92: Machynlleth
- 1992–93: Bow Street
- 1993–94: U. W. A.
- 1994–95: Bow Street
- 1995–96: Bow Street
- 1996–97: Padarn United
- 1997–98: Penrhyncoch reserves
- 1998–99: Penrhyncoch reserves
- 1999–2000: Penparcau

=== 2000s ===
- 2000–01: League not completed - Foot & Mouth outbreak
- 2001–02: Bow Street
- 2002–03: Bow Street
- 2003–04: Bow Street
- 2004–05: Penparcau
- 2005–06: Penrhyncoch reserves
- 2006–07: Bow Street
- 2007–08: Penparcau
- 2008–09: Dolgellau Athletic 'A'
- 2009–10: Bont

=== 2010s ===
- 2010–11: Aberdyfi
- 2011–12: Penrhyncoch reserves
- 2012–13: Tregaron Turfs
- 2013–14: Borth United
- 2014–15: Talybont
- 2015–16: Dolgellau Athletic
- 2016–17: Bont
- 2017–18: Bow Street reserves
- 2018–19: Penparcau
- 2019–20: Tregaron Turfs

=== 2020s ===
- 2020–21: Season cancelled due to Coronavirus pandemic
- 2021–22: Llanilar
- 2022–23: Penparcau reserves
- 2023–24: Bont
- 2024–25: Talybont
- 2025–26: Penparcau

=== Number of titles by winning clubs ===
- Penparcau – 12 titles
- CPD Penrhyncoch – 10 titles
- Bow Street – 9 titles
- Bont – 8 titles
- U. W. A./ University College of Wales – 6 titles
- Aberayron – 3 titles
- Aberystwyth Rovers – 3 titles
- Bryncrug – 3 titles
- Dolgellau Athletic – 3 titles
- Trefechain – 3 titles
- Tregaron Turfs – 3 titles
- Dewi Stars – 2 titles
- Llanilar – 2 titles
- Padarn United – 2 titles
- Talybont – 2 titles
- Aber Athletics Club – 1 title
- Aberdyfi – 1 title
- Aberystwyth Town reserves – 1 title
- Barmouth & Dyffryn United – 1 title
- Borth United – 1 title
- Machynlleth – 1 title
- Penparcau F.C. Reserves - 1 title
- Phoenix – 1 title
- YMCA – 1 title

== See also ==
- Football in Wales
- List of football clubs in Wales
