= Aberdyfi F.C. =

Football club based in Gwynedd

Aberdyfi
- Full name: Aberdyfi Football Club
- Founded: 1996
- Dissolved: 2022
- Ground: Station Road, Aberdyfi
- 2021–22: Aberystwyth League, 7th of 8
Home colours

Aberdyfi Football Club was a Welsh football club based in Aberdyfi, Gwynedd. They last played in the Aberystwyth League.

== History ==
Aberdyfi won the Welsh Amateur Cup in 1935, beating Aberystwyth Town 2–1 in the final. Aberdyfi Town also won the 1937–38 Cambrian Coast Football League. However this club folded in the 1960s.

They were reformed in 1996, joining the Aberystwyth League. In their first season they won the Division Two title, to earn promotion to Division One. In 2010–11 they were Aberystwyth League champions, earning promotion to the Mid Wales Football League Division Two.

In their first Mid Wales League season, they finished 11th out of 16 teams, and finished last out of 13 in their second season. They then returned to the Aberystwyth League. In 2011–12 they also played in the Welsh Cup, losing in the first qualifying round against Barmouth & Dyffryn United.

In 2017 they were relegated to Division Two of the Aberystwyth League, after finishing bottom of Division One. In 2019 they were promoted back to Division One.

The club folded in 2022.

== Honours ==
- Welsh Amateur Cup - Winners: 1934–35
- Cambrian Coast Football League - Champions: 1937–38
- Aberystwyth League Division Two - Champions: 1996–97
- Aberystwyth League Division One - Champions: 2010–11
