= Corris United F.C. =

Football club based in Gwynedd

Corris United
- Full name: Corris United Football Club
- Nickname(s): The Quarrymen
- Founded: 2019
- Ground: King George Playing Field
- League: Aberystwyth League Division One
- 2024–25: Aberystwyth League Division One, 3rd of 7
Home colours	Away colours

Corris United F.C. is a Welsh football club based in Corris, Gwynedd. The team currently plays in the Aberystwyth League Division One.

The club competed in the 1949–50 and 1955–56 Welsh Cups, but lost in the first round both times.

The club folded in 2011 but was reformed in 2019, rejoining the Aberystwyth League Division Two.

== Honours ==
- Cambrian Coast Football League - Champions: 1960–61
- Aberystwyth League Cup - Winners: 2024–25
