= NWCFA Challenge Cup =

Association football tournament in Wales

- Founded: 1923
- Region: Wales
- Most championships: Rhyl (16 titles)

The North Wales Coast FA Senior Challenge Cup is a football knockout tournament involving teams affiliated with the North Wales Coast Football Association (NWCFA).

It was first played in the 1923–24 season. The competition was suspended in 2014 due to a decreasing number of entries, with only six clubs applying to enter for 2014–15. The NWCFA had planned to revive it for the 2020–21, but the COVID-19 pandemic blocked these plans. It will return for 2026–27 including teams from tiers 1, 2 and 3 of the Welsh football league system.

== Previous winners ==
=== 1920s ===
- 1923–24: – Mold
- 1924–25: – Mold
- 1925–26: – Llandudno
- 1926–27: – Bangor
- 1927–28: – Rhyl
- 1928–29: – Connah's Quay & Shotton
- 1929–30: – Rhyl

=== 1930s ===
- 1930–31: – Colwyn Bay
- 1931–32: – Bethesda Victoria
- 1932–33: – Rhyl
- 1933–34: – Rhyl
- 1934–35: – Rhyl
- 1935–36: – Bangor City
- 1936–37: – Bangor City
- 1937–38: – Bangor City
- 1938–39: – Rhyl
- 1939–40: – Caernarfon Town

=== 1940s ===
- 1940–41: – suspended due to World War II
- 1941–42: – suspended due to World War II
- 1942–43: – suspended due to World War II
- 1943–44: – suspended due to World War II
- 1944–45: – suspended due to World War II
- 1945–46: – Caernarfon Town
- 1946–47: – Bangor City
- 1947–48: – Rhyl
- 1948–49: – Rhyl
- 1949–50: – Rhyl

=== 1950s ===
- 1950–51: – Rhyl
- 1951–52: – Bangor City
- 1952–53: – Rhyl
- 1953–54: – Rhyl
- 1954–55: – Rhyl
- 1955–56: – Holyhead Town
- 1956–57: – Caernarfon Town
- 1957–58: – Bangor City
- 1958–59: – Blaenau Ffestiniog
- 1959–60: – Pwllheli & District

=== 1960s ===
- 1960–61: – Colwyn Bay and Bethesda
- 1961–62: – Pwllheli & District
- 1962–63: – Borough United
- 1963–64: – Borough United
- 1964–65: – Bangor City
- 1965–66: – Caernarfon Town
- 1966–67: – Holyhead Town
- 1967–68: – Bangor City
- 1968–69: – Barmouth & Dyffryn United
- 1969–70: – Rhyl

=== 1970s ===
- 1970–71: – Barmouth & Dyffryn United
- 1971–72: – Blaenau Ffestiniog
- 1972–73: – Denbigh Town
- 1973–74: – Porthmadog
- 1974–75: – Porthmadog
- 1975–76: – Bethesda Athletic
- 1976–77: – Porthmadog
- 1977–78: – Porthmadog
- 1978–79: – Pwllheli
- 1979–80: – Caernarfon Town

=== 1980s ===
- 1980–81: – Caernarfon Town
- 1981–82: – Colwyn Bay
- 1982–83: – Colwyn Bay
- 1983–84: – Colwyn Bay
- 1984–85: – Ffynnongroew
- 1985–86: – Mold Alexandra
- 1986–87: – Holywell Town
- 1987–88: – Y Felinheli
- 1988–89: – Mostyn
- 1989–90: – Mold Alexandra

=== 1990s ===
- 1990–91: – Flint Town United
- 1991–92: – Colwyn Bay
- 1992–93: – Bangor City
- 1993–94: – Connah's Quay Nomads
- 1994–95: – Llandudno
- 1995–96: – Colwyn Bay
- 1996–97: – Porthmadog
- 1997–98: – Colwyn Bay
- 1998–99: – Bangor City
- 1999–2000: – Colwyn Bay

=== 2000s ===
- 2000–01: – Caernarfon Town
- 2001–02: – Caernarfon Town
- 2002–03: – Porthmadog
- 2003–04: – Rhyl
- 2004–05: – Bangor City
- 2005–06: – Rhyl
- 2006–07: – Flint Town United
- 2007–08: – Llandudno
- 2008–09: – Llandudno
- 2009–10: – Porthmadog

=== 2010s ===
- 2010–11: – Colwyn Bay
- 2011–12: – Bangor City
- 2012–13: – Prestatyn Town
- 2013–14: – Caernarfon Town
- 2014–15: – competition suspended
