= Quar Park Rangers F.C. =

Football club based in Merthyr Tydfil

Quar Park Rangers
- Full name: Quar Park Rangers Football Club
- Founded: 2005
- Dissolved: 2021
- Ground: ICI Rifle Fields
- 2020–21: Aberdare Valley League Division One (A), season cancelled
Home colours

Quar Park Rangers F.C. was a Welsh football club based in Merthyr Tydfil. The team last played in the Aberdare Valley League Division One (A), which is at the eighth tier of the Welsh football league system.

== Background ==
The club was founded in 2005, joining the Merthyr & District League.

The club reached the final of the 2018–19 South Wales FA Senior Cup, losing to Llanrumney United.

The club competed in the 2019–20 Welsh Cup, losing to Merthyr Saints in the first qualifying round.

The club was admitted to the Aberdare Valley League for the 2020–21 season, but the season was cancelled due to the COVID-19 pandemic. The club folded in 2021.
