= The North Wales Express =

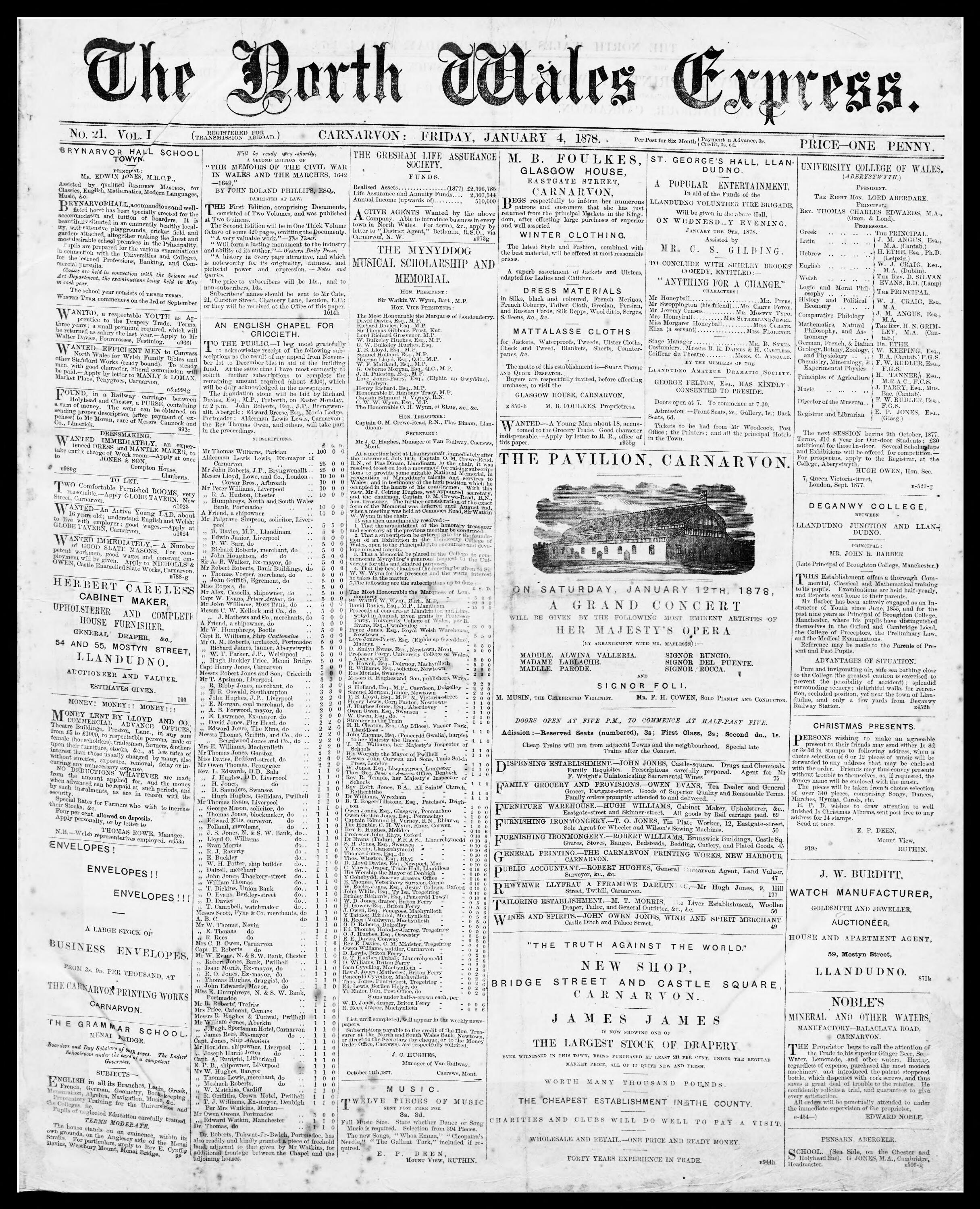
- Volume 21, issue 1 dated January 4, 1878
- Type: Weekly newspaper
- Publisher: Robert Williams
- Founded: 17 August 1877
- Language: English
- Ceased publication: 12 September 1884
- City: Caernarfon
- Country: Wales

The North Wales Express was a weekly English language newspaper published in Caernarfon, Wales between 1877 and 1884. Its circulation area was Caernarfon, Bangor, and surrounding areas of north Wales. After 371 issues it merged with The Bangor Observer and North Wales Advertiser to form The North Wales Observer and Express, in which guise it continued to be published until 1921.
