= Cambrian Coast Football League =

- Founded: 1920
- Folded: 1963
- Country: Wales

The Cambrian Coast Football League was a football league covering Mid Wales, in Wales, United Kingdom. It was also known during its history as the Cambrian Coast League.

== League History ==
The league was founded in January 1920. It ran in the post-World War One period through to the end of the 1921–22 season, before it was absorbed into the Welsh National League system. It was reformed for the 1930–31 season as an eight club league. The league considered a proposal to merge with the Mid-Wales League in May 1935 but rejected this and continued, inviting additional clubs to join the league.

The league ran through to the end of the 1962–63 season. Plans to reform the league in 1971 failed, and the league never returned.

The history of the league was documented by Mel ap Ior Thomas, who set up the Welsh Football Data Archive. He researched, wrote and published the ‘History of the Cambrian Coast League’.

== League Champions ==
Those years empty are not known.

=== 1910s ===
- 1919–20: – Barmouth

=== 1920s ===
- 1920–21: – Pwllheli
- 1921–22: – Barmouth

=== 1930s ===
- 1930–31: – Machynlleth
- 1931–32: – Machynlleth
- 1932–33: – Aberystwyth Town
- 1933–34: – Aberystwyth Town
- 1934–35: – Aberystwyth Town
- 1935–36: – Aberystwyth Town
- 1936–37: – Aberystwyth Town
- 1937–38: – Aberdyfi Town
- 1938–39: – Machynlleth
- 1939–40: – Football suspended - World War Two

=== 1940s ===
- 1940–41: – Football suspended - World War Two
- 1941–42: – Football suspended - World War Two
- 1942–43: – Football suspended - World War Two
- 1944–45: – Football suspended - World War Two
- 1945–46: – Tywyn
- 1946–47: – Machynlleth
- 1947–48: – Machynlleth
- 1948–49: – Machynlleth
- 1949–50: – Aberystwyth Town

=== 1950s ===
- 1950–51: – 55th R.A. Tonfannau 'B'
- 1951–52: – Bryncrug
- 1952–53: – 55th R.A. Tonfannau
- 1953–54: – 37th H.A.A. Tonfannau
- 1954–55: – Barmouth & Dyffryn United
- 1955–56: – 55th R.A. Tonfannau
- 1956–57: – Aberystwyth Town
- 1957–58: – 55th R.A. Tonfannau
- 1958–59: – Bala Town
- 1959–60: – Porthmadog Reserves

=== 1960s ===
- 1960–61: – Corris United
- 1961–62: – Porthmadog Reserves
- 1962–63: – Bala Town
