= Llanilar F.C. =

Football club based in Ceredigion

Llanilar
- Full name: Clwb Pel Droed Llanilar Football Club
- Ground: Castle Hill Park
- League: Central Wales Southern Division
- 2024–25: Central Wales Southern Division, 10th of 17
Home colours	Away colours

C.P.D. Llanilar is a Welsh football club based in Llanilar, Ceredigion. The team currently plays in the Central Wales Southern Division.

The club has competed in the Welsh Cup, getting to the second qualifying round in 2023–24, where they lost on penalties to Montgomery Town.

The club also has a reserve team in Division One of the Aberystwyth League.

In 2025 the club installed new dugouts at their Castle Hill Park ground, with support from sponsors Statkraft.

== Honours ==
- Aberystwyth League - Champions: 1973–74, 2021–22
- Aberystwyth League Cup - Winners: 2018–19
- Ceredigion League Third Division - Champions: 2021–22 (reserves)
