= Myddelton College =

School in Denbighshire, Wales

Coordinates: 53.1828°N 3.4155°W

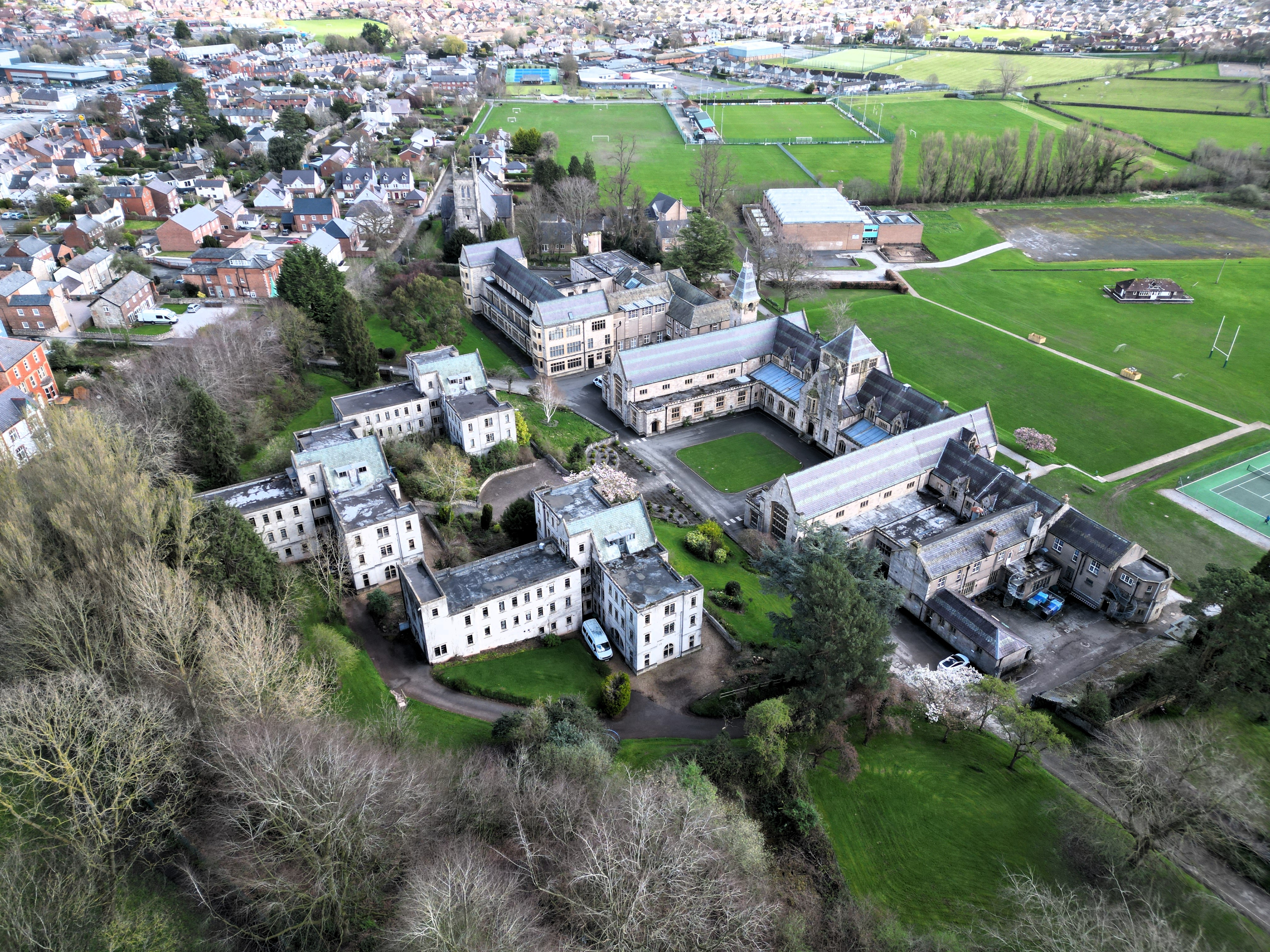
- Myddelton College

Location
- Peakes Lane; Denbigh, Denbighshire, LL16 3EN

Information
- Type: Private day and boarding
- Department for Education URN: 402370 Tables
- Gender: Coeducational
- Age: 7 to 18
- Website: www.myddeltoncollege.com

Myddelton College is located at Denbigh in Wales on the site of Howell's School, Denbigh, a former girls' school founded in 1859. It was reopened in 2016 as an independent co-educational day and boarding school.

== History ==
The college, taking its name from the local Myddelton family who lived in the town, provides education for boys and girls aged 5–18. The campus covers 37 acres and in addition to the main Grade II listed block there are four boarding houses and the headmaster's house.

The sports facilities include an open-air swimming-pool, four tennis courts, a sports hall used by local clubs, squash courts, a climbing wall and caving centre, rugby pitch, football pitch and equestrian centre. The college has many athletes that compete in national teams including triathlon, swimming, gymnastics, horse riding, sailing, climbing and ice skating among others.
