= Menai Bridge Tigers F.C. =

Association football club in Wales

Menai Bridge Tigers
- Full name: Menai Bridge Tigers Football Club
- Nickname: Tigers
- Ground: Treborth Playing Fields, Bangor University
- Chairman: Robyn Cooke
- Manager: Aaron Rowlands
- League: North Wales Coast West Premier Division
- 2025–26: North Wales Coast West Premier Division, 2nd of 15

Menai Bridge Tigers Football Club is a Welsh football team based in Menai Bridge on the Isle of Anglesey in north-west Wales. The team play in the North Wales Coast West Premier Division.

== History ==
The history of football clubs playing in Menai Bridge sees teams playing in the various leagues operating in North Wales, as well as clubs being formed and folding with considerable gaps of clubs playing in leagues.

Football in the town of Menai Bridge can be traced back as early as 1878, when The North Wales Express reported on a Christmas Day football match between the Menai Football Club and Blue Star, with the latter winning by 3 goals (plus one disputed) to one.

=== First league appearances ===
In 1897, the Menai Bridge Football Club unanimously resolved to join the proposed Anglesey League and finished the 1897–98 season as league champions, before joining the North Wales Coast League for the 1898–99 season, where they finished bottom of the league. Records show Menai Bridge Tigers featuring in Division Two of the same league from 1909 to 1910 until the outbreak of World War One.

=== 1920s and 1930s ===
The 1926–27 and 1927–28 seasons saw the club as compete in the Welsh National League (North) as a Division Two West club.

The team then again feature in the Anglesey League as Menai Bridge finishing 1928–29 as champions and the 1929–30 season as runners-up before joining the North Wales Coast League for the 1930–31 season and moving to the Bangor & District League for the 1931–32 season, as one of two Anglesey based teams to feature in the league. The club won two league titles in the 1932–33 and 1933–34 seasons.

=== Post Second World War to mid 1960s ===
As Menai Bridge, the team finished runners-up in Division IIIA (Anglesey League Division Two) in 1947–48, runners-up of the Welsh League North Division Two (Western) in 1948–49, and champions of Division IIIB (Anglesey League Division Two) in 1950–51. and continued to play in the Anglesey League until the end of the 1963–64 season. Menai Bridge Youth played in Caernarfon & District League during the following 1964–65 season but the team seems to disappear after that.

=== 1970s and 1980s ===
The team returned to the Anglesey League as Menai Bridge Tigers for the 1975–76 season, finishing in fourth place, and then were league runners-up on three successive occasions, in 1976–77; 1977–78 and 1978–79. The club then finished third in the 1979–80 season and were promoted to the Welsh League North for the 1980–81 season. They finished bottom of the table and after finishing third from bottom of the league the following season were relegated.

The club then returned to the Anglesey League, finishing third in Division Two. As part of ongoing discussions around restructuring of football in North Wales, the club hosted a meeting at the Menai Bridge Tigers Sports and Recreation Club on 23 June 1983, and the Gwynedd Football League was born. Admitted into the league were Benllech & District, Bethesda Athletic, Conwy United, Llandudno Amateurs, Llanfairpwll, Menai Bridge Tigers, Porthmadog and Y Felinheli. The club finished bottom of the table scoring only three points (one win and one draw) from fourteen matches. Following the end of the season the club resigned from the league because of financial difficulties. The 1984–85 season saw football return to the town with a club called Menai Bridge Town appearing in the Anglesey League Division Two until the end of the 1988–89 season. The next two decades were spent as a junior only club.

=== 2000s return to senior football ===
The club returned to the Anglesey League for the 2009–10 season as Menai Bridge Tigers finishing seventh from nine clubs. The 2013–14 season was successful with the club finishing the season as league champions and gaining promotion to the Gwynedd League. The 2018–19 season saw further success with the club finishing as Gwynedd League champions. Promotion to the Welsh Alliance League Division Two was denied by the Football Association of Wales, even after the club appealed the initial decision from the FAW.

The club finished third in 2019–20, the final season of the Gwynedd League and joined the newly formed North Wales Coast West Football League Premier Division for the 2020–21 season. This was cancelled due to the COVID-19 pandemic, with the club starting the 2021–22 season when amateur football returned to Wales in the summer of 2021.

== Seasons ==
Results of league and cup competitions by season
Season	League											Cups		Top goalscorer(s)	
Season	Division	Tier	Pld	W	D	L	GF	GA	GD	Pts	Pos	Welsh Cup	FAW Trophy	Player(s)	Goals
2009–10	Anglesey League	5	16	5	1	10	45	40	+5	16	7th	Ineligible to enter			
2010-11	Anglesey League	6	22	12	3	7	67	49	+18	39	4th	Ineligible to enter			
2011-12	Anglesey League	6	22	14	3	5	62	39	+33	45	3rd	Ineligible to enter			
2012-13	Anglesey League	6	24	16	3	5	103	35	+67	51	3rd	Ineligible to enter		Lance Williams	62
2013-14	Anglesey League↑	6	20	14	2	4	72	33	+39	44	1st	Did not enter		Gareth Barker	28
2014-15	Gwynedd League	5	28	14	6	8	99	59	+40	48	5th	Did not enter		Gareth Barker	26
2015-16	Gwynedd League	5	24	14	3	7	69	47	+22	45	4th	QR1		Lance Williams	35
2016-17	Gwynedd League	5	22	10	4	8	57	49	+8	34	5th	QR1	R2	Gareth Barker	15
2017-18	Gwynedd League	5	22	7	5	10	48	50	-2	26	9th	Did not enter	R1	Dave Baston	10
2018-19	Gwynedd League	5	20	18	1	1	85	19	+66	55	1st	QR1	Did not enter	Dean Redmond	39
2019-20	Gwynedd League	5	15	11	2	2	47	19	+28	34	3rd	QR1	R3	Callum Davidson	16
2020-21	NWC West Premier	4	Competition not played – Covid-19 pandemic												
2021-22	NWC West Premier	4	28	13	2	13	73	63	+10	41	8th	QR1	R4	Dean Redmond	18
2022-23	NWC West Premier	4	28	15	4	9	81	50	+31	49	6th	QR1	R1	Callum Davidson	20
2023-24	NWC West Premier↑	4	28	19	5	4	105	45	+60	62	2nd	R2	R5	Callum Graves	40
2024-25	Ardal NW	3	30	3	3	24	44	102	-58	12	15th	R1	QR1	Callum Graves	12
2025-26	NWC West Premier	4	28	18	6	4	91	43	+48	60	2nd	QR1	R2		

== Honours ==
=== Leagues ===
- North Wales Coast West Football League Premier Division
  - Runners-up (2): 2023-24; 2025–26
- Gwynedd League
  - Champions (1): 2018–19
- Anglesey League
  - Champions (3): 1897–98, 1928–29, 2013–14
  - Runners-up (3): 1922–23, 1929–30, 1947-48 1976–77, 1977–78, 1978–79
  - Division Two – Champions (1): 1950–51
  - Division Two – Runners-up (1): 1947–48
- Bangor & District League
  - Winners (2): 1932–33, 1933–34
  - Runners-up (1): 1931–32

=== Cups ===
- North Wales Coast FA Junior Challenge Cup – Winners (8 - competition record): 1911–12, 1913–14, 1926–27, 1929–30, 1931–32, 1932–33, 1946–47, 1947–48

==== Anglesey League ====
- Dargie Cup – Winners (2): 1928–29, 1978–79
- Elias Cup – Winners (1): 2012–13
- IPP Cup – Winners (1): 2013–14
- JW Lees Shield – Winners (1): 1981–82
- Megan Cup – Winners (4): 1930–31, 1978–79, 2012–13, 2013–14
- SK Williams Challenge Shield - Winners (1): 1979–80

==== Gwynedd League ====
- Gwynedd Cup – Winners (2): 2014–15, 2018–19
- Bob Owen Memorial Shield – Winners (1): 2015–16
