= Lucas Cwmbran A.F.C. =

Association football club in Wales

Lucas Cwmbran
- Nickname(s): The Brakemen
- Founded: 1946
- Ground: Lucas Girling Sports Ground
- League: Gwent County League Premier Division
- 2024–25: Gwent County League Premier Division, 15th of 16

Lucas Cwmbran is a Welsh football team based in Cwmbran. The team currently play in the Gwent County League Premier Division.

== History ==
The club was formed as part of two factory teams, Cwmbran Girlings FC and Pontypool Girlings FC. These two sides combined in the 1990s to become a stronger team competing as Girlings FC. In the 2000s Saunders Valve FC amalgamated with the club to create the present club of Lucas Cwmbran AFC.

They were founding members of the Gwent County League.

== Honours ==
- Gwent County League Division One - Runners-up: 2019–20
- Gwent County League Division Three - Runners-up: 2010-11
