= Tywyn Bryncrug F.C. =

Association football club in Wales

Tywyn Bryncrug
- Full name: Tywyn Bryncrug Football Club
- Nickname: Crug
- Founded: 1989; 37 years ago
- Ground: Cae Chwarae; Bryncrug; Gwynedd
- League: Central Wales Northern Division
- 2025–26: Central Wales Northern Division, 5th of 15
| Home colours | Away colours |

Tywyn Bryncrug Football Club (Note: There is some variation in the styling of the name, even officially within the club. The club's X and Instagram accounts both use Tywyn Bryncrug. The club's Facebook account uses Tywyn/Bryncrug with a slash, as well as their crest. Local news has also used a hyphenated form Tywyn-Bryncrug.) is a Welsh football club representing the town of Tywyn and the nearby village of Bryncrug, Gwynedd. They play in the Central Wales Northern Division.

The club plays its home games at Cae Chwarae or Bryncrug Field. The home colours are orange shirts with black shorts and orange socks.

== History ==
=== Tywyn ===
Tywyn played in the Mid Wales League from 1984 to 1986.

=== Bryncrug ===
Bryncrug won the Cambrian Coast League in 1951–52.

They later moved to the Aberystwyth League where they won the league in 1979–80, 1984–85 and 1986–87. After their final title, they were elected to take Aberystwyth Town's place in the Mid Wales League. They stayed in the Mid Wales League until the merger in 1989.

=== Merger ===
Tywyn Bryncrug F.C. was formed in 1989 as merger of Bryncrug and Tywyn and played in the Mid Wales League for two seasons before leaving the league. They rejoined the league for the 2006–07 season. They were champions of the West Division for the 2021–22 season and runners-up in the J. Emrys Morgan Cup.

In 2023 the club considered forming a reserve team. This team was formed, joining the Aberystwyth League.

== Honours ==
- Mid Wales Football League West Division – Champions: 2021–22
- Aberystwyth League Division One – Runners-up: 1994–95, 1995–96
- Aberystwyth League Division Two – Champions: 1991–92, 1994–95 (reserves)
- J. Emrys Morgan Cup – Runners-up: 2021–22
