= Borth United F.C. =

Football club based in Ceredigion

Borth United
- Full name: Borth United Football Club
- Nickname: The Crows
- Founded: 1980, 2009 (reformed)
- Dissolved: 2001
- Ground: Uppingham Playing Fields
- Capacity: 1000 (50 seated)
- Chairman: Tim Ellis-Clark
- Manager: Ian Lewis
- League: Aberystwyth League Division One
- 2025–26: Aberystwyth League Division One, 6th of 9
Home colours	Away colours

Borth United Football Club is a Welsh football club based in Borth, Ceredigion. The team plays in the Aberystwyth League Division One.

The club has regularly competed in the qualifying rounds of the Welsh Cup, most recently in the 2021–22 season.

== History ==
There was a Borth team competing in the Aberystwyth Junior League in the 1897–98 season.

A football club in Borth was founded in 1908, playing at the Ynys Field.

Borth United were founding members of the Aberystwyth & District League in 1934. The club folded in 2001.

A new club was founded in 2009. In the 2013–14 season, they won the Aberystwyth League title. and were promoted into the Mid Wales Football League Division Two. In the 2016–17 season, Borth United were promoted to Division One, but finished 16th out of 16 the following season and were relegated back to Division Two.

In 2018–19, the club reached the first round of Welsh Cup, losing 2–0 to Llangefni Town.

In 2020, the club left the Mid Wales League. They then rejoined the Aberystwyth League.

== Honours ==
- Aberystwyth League - Champions: 2013–14
- Aberystwyth League Cup - Winners: 2013–14
- Aberystwyth League Cup - Runners-up: 2022–23
- J. Emrys Morgan Cup - Winners: 2012–13
