= Machynlleth F.C. =

Association football club in Wales

Coordinates: 52°35′17″N 3°51′5″W

Machynlleth
- Full name: Machynlleth Football Club
- Founded: 1885; 1896 (reformed)
- Ground: Cae Glas
- Manager: Richard Evans
- League: Central Wales Northern Division
- 2025–26: Central Wales Southern Division, 5th of 13 (lateral league transfer)
Home colours	Away colours

Machynlleth Football Club (Welsh: Clwb Pêl Droed Machynlleth) is a Welsh football club based in Machynlleth, Powys, Wales. They play in the Central Wales Northern Division.

The club was founded in 1885 and was reformed in 1896. They have played in the Cambrian Coast Football League, the Aberystwyth & District League and the Mid Wales Football League. Their most successful period was between 1992 and 1995 when they won three consecutive Mid Wales League titles.

The club has also won a national competition, the Welsh Amateur Cup, in the 1931–32 season.

== History ==
On Tuesday 8 September 1885, a meeting was held at the "cocoa rooms", which unanimously decided to establish a football club in Machynlleth.

In the 1890s, there were several teams in Machynlleth, including Machynlleth Town, Machynlleth Rovers, Machynlleth Intermediate School, and a reserve team.

On the evening of Saturday 24 October 1896, a meeting was held in the National Schools, and a new Machynlleth Football Club was formed. Joining the Coast League was considered, but the club decided against it.

Machynlleth Town reached the final of the 1901–02 Welsh Junior Cup, where they lost 1–0 to Wrexham Victoria. Wrexham Victoria were awarded the cup, which Machynlleth protested, saying that Wrexham Victoria had used five players who were ineligible due to having played in the Chester & District League. Their protest was successful and Wrexham Victoria were ordered to return the cup to the Football Association of Wales. It is unclear if the cup was ever awarded to Machynlleth. Wrexham Victoria are recorded as the cup winners by recent sources such as the RSSSF.

Machynlleth played in the 1921–22 FA Cup, losing 7–0 to Chester in the extra preliminary round.

In 1931–32, the team reached the final of the Welsh Amateur Cup, and were to play Cardiff Corinthians. In the final, held at the Smithfield enclosure in Aberystwyth, three second-half goals secured a 3–0 win to become winners of the competition.

In 1937–38, they won the Montgomeryshire Challenge Cup. In 1939, they won the Gresham Cup.

The club played in the Cambrian Coast Football League and won six league titles: 1930–31; 1931–32; 1938–39; 1946–47; 1947–48; 1948–49. They also played in the Mid Wales Football League between 1950 and 1971.

In the 1969–70 season Machynlleth's Aberystwyth & District League team finished level on points with Bont, but Bont had one game unplayed (against Bryncrug), so Machynlleth suggested that the title should be awarded to Bont.

In the December 1971, the club was on the brink of folding, already having withdrawn their reserves from the Aberystwyth League, and it "inevitable" that they would have to do the same with their first team in the Mid Wales League. Later that month, the first team withdrew from the league, but the club had second thoughts about the decision. The club can be presumed to have stayed out of the league regardless as they do not appear in the final table for 1971–72.

The club again competed in the Mid Wales League from 1977 to 1980.

In 1984, Machynlleth were accepted to rejoin the Central Wales League (as it was now known). They had initially planned to apply for promotion for 1985–86, but moved their application forward due to reorganisation of the Aberystwyth League. The club played in the Central Wales League for five seasons before leaving in 1989.

The club then returned to the Aberystwyth League, finishing 8th in Division Two in their first season back. They were then promoted as champions of Division Two, with an unbeaten record of 23 wins and 1 draw, and had a similar unbeaten record in the next season to win Division One with 19 wins and one draw.

After this success, the club applied to rejoin the Mid Wales League. Their application was accepted subject to meeting the standards for the ground and other facilities. The standards appear to have been met as the club did compete in the Mid Wales League for the 1992–93 season.

On 15 May 1993, Machynlleth were second in the Mid Wales League, and would require 2 points from their final two games to overtake Morda United, who had already finished their season. They achieved this, winning both games to finish 4 points ahead of Morda, but seemed unwilling to accept promotion to the Cymru Alliance. The manager Dai Eifion Davies was among those opposed, and club secretary Gwyn Evans said "My own personal feeling is that we want to consolidate our position". The club was not promoted, and remained in the Mid Wales League for the following season, citing fears that their facilities "might not be acceptable".

A final day win made sure they would defend their title in 1993–94, as they needed 3 points to go top ahead of Llandrindod Wells, and won 9–1 against Morda United to retain the title by one point. At the end of the season, the manager Dai Eifion Davies stepped down. Machynlleth were declined for promotion as their changing facilities did not meet the required criteria, and second-place Llandrindod Wells were promoted instead.

They again won the league title in 1994–95 as well as gaining the CWFA Challenge Cup. It was speculated that a playoff may be played between them, Rhydymwyn and Oswestry Town to decide promotion to the Cymru Alliance. In the end Machynlleth were not promoted, and had two more seasons in the Mid Wales League, finishing 7th and 10th before leaving in 1997. Their withdrawal was described as a "shock move" with the club's success still so recent. The club stepped down to return to the Aberystwyth League.

In their first season back in the Aberystwyth League they were Division Two champions. This was followed by a last place finish in Division One, with just one league win all season. In the next season the team finished third and was promoted again. They struggled in 2000–01 but the season was abandoned due to a foot-and-mouth outbreak. The team remained in Division One for another five seasons before a last place finish in the 2005–06 season. Early in the season, the club was in danger of folding due to rising costs. In 2008–09 a second-place finish was enough to return to Division One, where they finished seventh of 11 teams in their first season before finishing runners-up to Aberdyfi in 2010–11.

The club then returned to the Mid Wales League, in Division Two. After two mid-table finishes, they finished second in 2013–14 and were promoted to Division One. They finished in the bottom half in all four of their Division One seasons, and were relegated back to Division Two in 2018. In 2019–20, the final season before a restructure of the Welsh football league system, they were runners-up in the division.

In 2020, they were announced as members of the Ardal Leagues North East, at the third tier of Welsh football. They finished 13th of 16 teams in 2021–22 but withdrew from the league in July 2022 citing lack of player commitment. From the 2022–23 season they have instead played in the Central Wales Southern Division, where they were runners-up in 2023–24.

== Ground ==
The club plays at Cae Glas. On 5 December 2018, a friendly was played against Welsh Premier League champions The New Saints to officially open the club's new floodlights.

== Honours ==
- Welsh Amateur Cup – Winners: 1931–32
- Welsh Amateur Cup – Runners-up: 1901–02
- Mid Wales Football League Division One – Champions: 1992–93; 1993–94; 1994–95
- Mid Wales Football League Division One – Runners-up: 2013–14; 2019–20
- Cambrian Coast Football League – Champions: 1930–31; 1931–32; 1938–39; 1946–47; 1947–48; 1948–49
- CWFA Challenge Cup – Winners: 1994–95
- Montgomeryshire Challenge Cup – Winners: 1937–38
- Gresham Cup – Winners: 1939
