= Rhyl Dragons F.C. =

Football club based in Denbighshire

Rhyl Dragons
- Full name: Rhyl Dragons Football Club
- Founded: 2020
- Dissolved: 2023
- 2023–24: North Wales Coast East Division One, (resigned from league)
Home colours

Rhyl Dragons F.C. was a Welsh football club based in Rhyl, Denbighshire. The team last played in the North Wales Coast East Football League Division One, which is at the fifth tier of the Welsh football league system.

The club was founded in 2020.

The club has competed in the Welsh Cup three times, losing in the first qualifying round all three times.

In November 2023, the club resigned from the North Wales Coast East Football League Division One.
