= Dolgellau Athletic A.F.C. =

Association football club in Wales

Coordinates: 52°44′36″N 3°53′28″W

Dolgellau
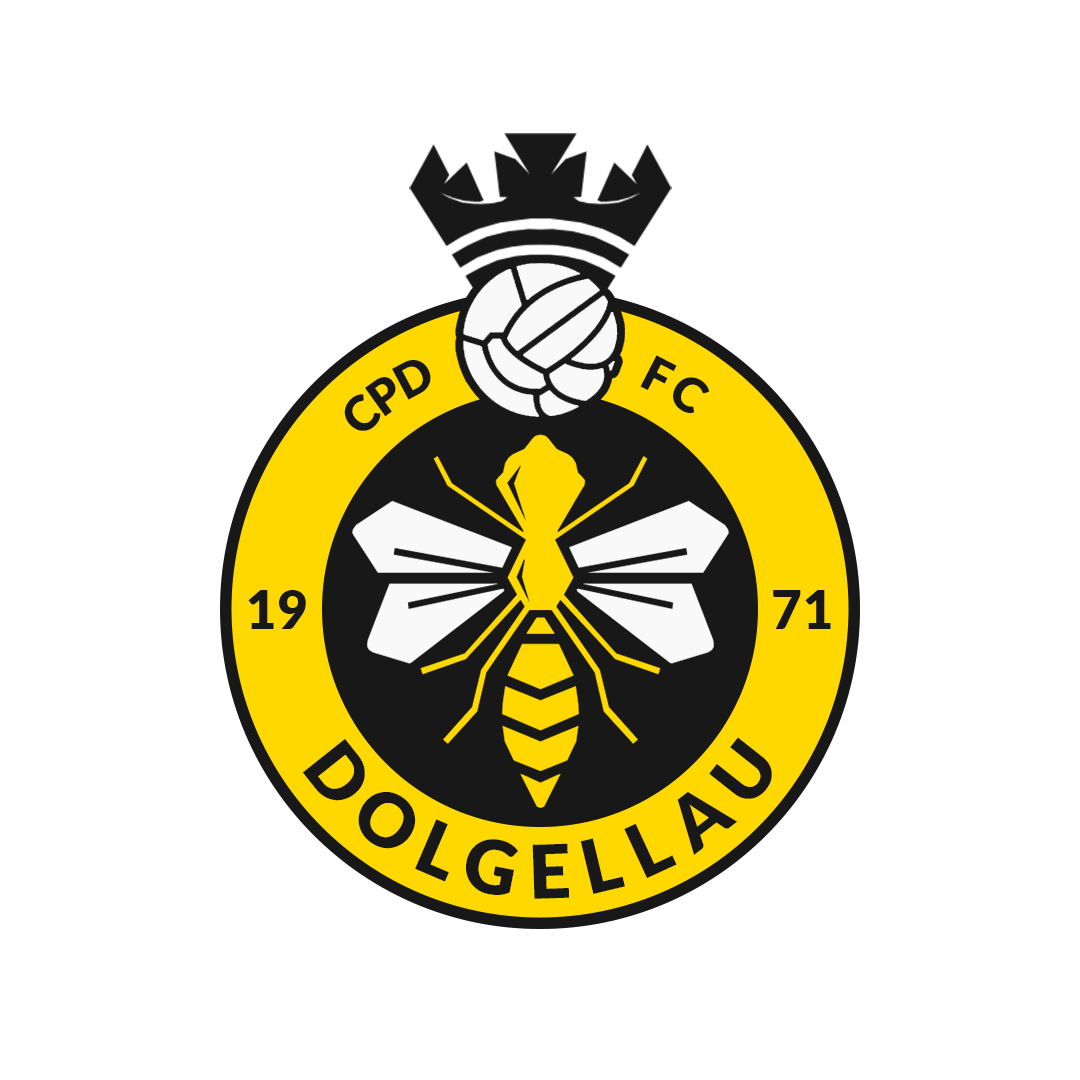
- Full name: Dolgellau Athletic Amateur Football Club
- Nickname: The Hornets
- Founded: 1971
- Ground: Y Marian; Dolgellau
- Chairman: Glyn Roberts
- Manager: Robert Evans
- League: Ardal NE League
- 2025–26: Ardal NE League, 3rd of 16
- Website: https://www.dolgellauaafc.co.uk/
Home colours	Away colours

Dolgellau Athletic A.F.C. are a Welsh football club based in Dolgellau, Wales, who play in the Ardal NE League.

They also have a reserve team playing in the MMP Central Wales League. In 2012 19-year-old David Webber became the youngest football manager in senior British football history when he was appointed first team manager at Dolgellau.

The home colours are yellow shirts with a black chevron and black shorts and socks.

A club was formed in Dolgellau as far back as 1879.

== History ==
=== Early football in Dolgellau ===
The first known record of football being played in Dolgellau dates back to 1879, only two years after the establishment of the Football Association of Wales in 1877. In the same year, Dolgelley FC participated in the Welsh Cup, losing 3-0 to Newtown White Stars, who later won the competition.

Reports of football matches in Dolgellau appeared in local newspapers including Y Dydd and the Cambrian News and Meirionethshire Standard from 1878 onwards, indicating that organised football had been played on Y Marian ground since the late nineteenth century.

Football was also established within local education, with records of matches between Dolgellau County School and Grammar School during the 1880's.

=== Cambrian League and local football ===
By 1886, Dolgellau had joined the Cambrian League alongside clubs from Tywyn, Porthmadog, Blaenau Ffestiniog, Barmouth and Penygroes. In 1898, the club was banned from holding matches on the Marian for six months following crowd disturbances among supporters.

The Cambrian League later evolved into the Cambrian Coast League, in which Dolgellau continued to compete until the league ceased in 1962. Local derby matches against Barmouth regularly attracted large attendances, with reports suggesting crowds in excess of 1,000 spectators during the early twentieth century.

=== Professional era ===
In 1960, Dolgellau Athletic joined the Welsh League North as a professional club, while another Dolgellau side continued competing in the Cambrian Coast League. The professional club folded during the 1964–65 season.

Following the dissolution of Dolgellau Athletic and the end of the Cambrian Coast League, the town was left without a league football club for approximately six years. During this period, the former football ground was sold for industrial development.

=== Formation of Dolgellau A.A.F.C ===
Dolgellau Athletic Amateur Football Club was founded in 1971 and joined the Aberystwyth and District League. The club began playing at its current ground following the loss of the original Marian field.

The club currently fields multiple teams within the Welsh football league system, including a first team and reserve side.

== Players ==
=== First-team squad ===
As of May 2026 Note: Flags indicate national team as defined under FIFA eligibility rules; some limited exceptions apply. Players may hold more than one non-FIFA nationality.

No.	Pos.	Nation	Player
—	GK	WAL	Tyler Andrews
—	DF	WAL	Ben Fisher
—	DF	WAL	Dion James
—	DF	WAL	Guto Pugh
—	DF	WAL	Harri Davies
—	DF	WAL	Joey Jones
—	DF	WAL	Rob John Kimberley
—	MF	WAL	Robert Evans
—	MF	WAL	Gethin Evans

No.	Pos.	Nation	Player
—	MF	WAL	Ioan Roberts
—	MF	WAL	Aaron Young
—	MF	WAL	Steven Jones
—	FW	WAL	Gerwyn Williams (captain)
—	FW	WAL	Daniel Thomas
—	FW	WAL	Osian Morris
—	FW	ENG	Paul Lewis
—	FW	WAL	Wil Gruffydd
—	FW	WAL	Jamie Jones

=== Player of the Year ===
The following players have been named Dolgellau A.A.F.C's Player of the Year.

- 2021-22: Gerwyn Williams
- 2022-23: Jake Jones
- 2023-24: Gerwyn Williams
- 2024-25: Osian Morris

=== Young Player of the Year ===
- 2021-22: Jamie Jones
- 2022-23: Johan Aufdenkamp
- 2023-24: Tyler Andrews
- 2024-25: Guto Pugh

=== Top scorers ===
- 2021-22: Gerwyn Williams (10)
- 2022-23: Gerwyn Williams (10)
- 2023-24: Gerwyn Williams (30)
- 2024-25: Osian Morris (26)

=== Reserves Top scorers ===
- 2021-22: Jack Thomas
- 2022-23: Tom Lloyd
- 2023-24: Tommy Redgrift
- 2024-25: Rhys Taylor-Clarke

== Y Marian football ground gallery ==
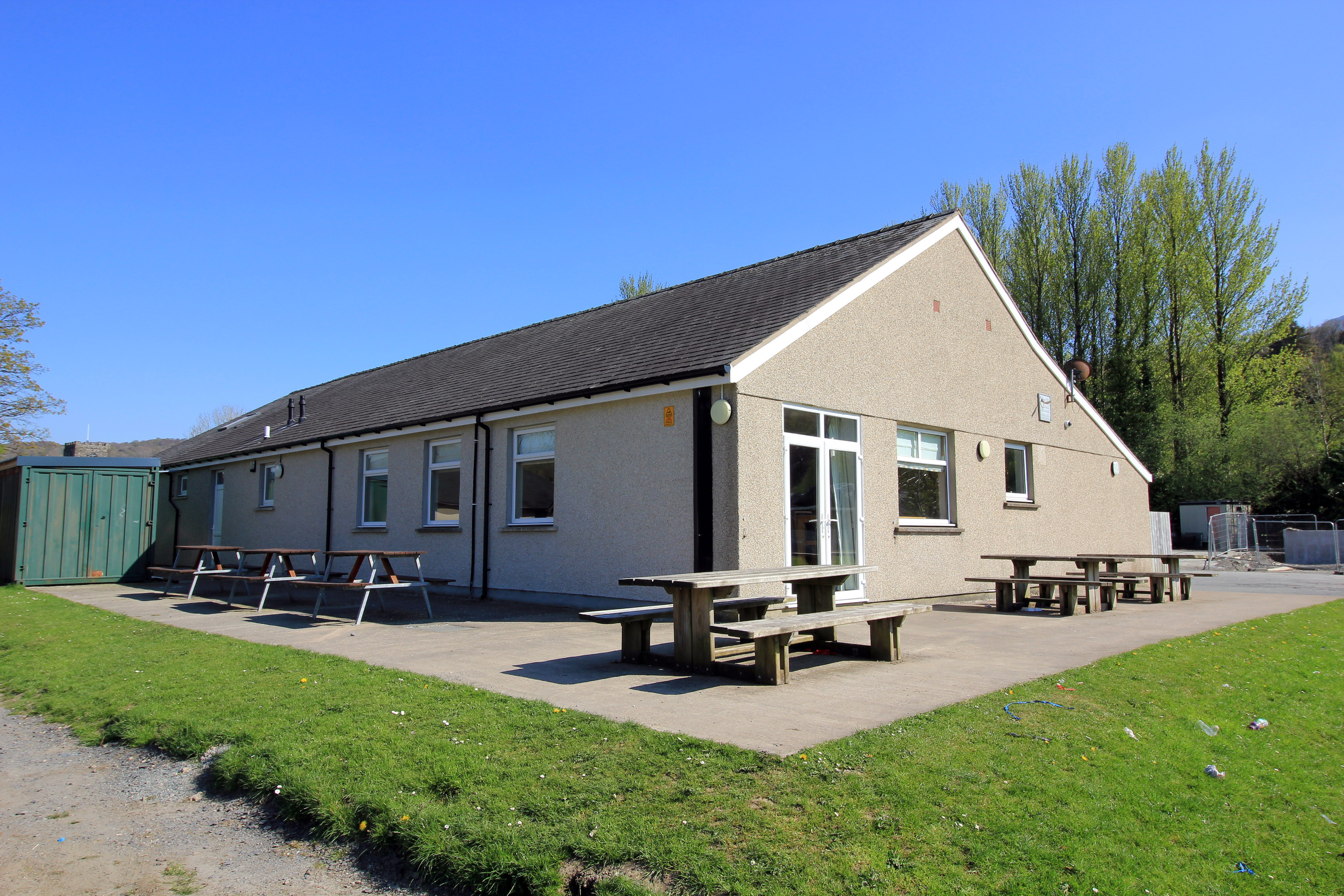
The Dolgellau AAFC Clubhouse

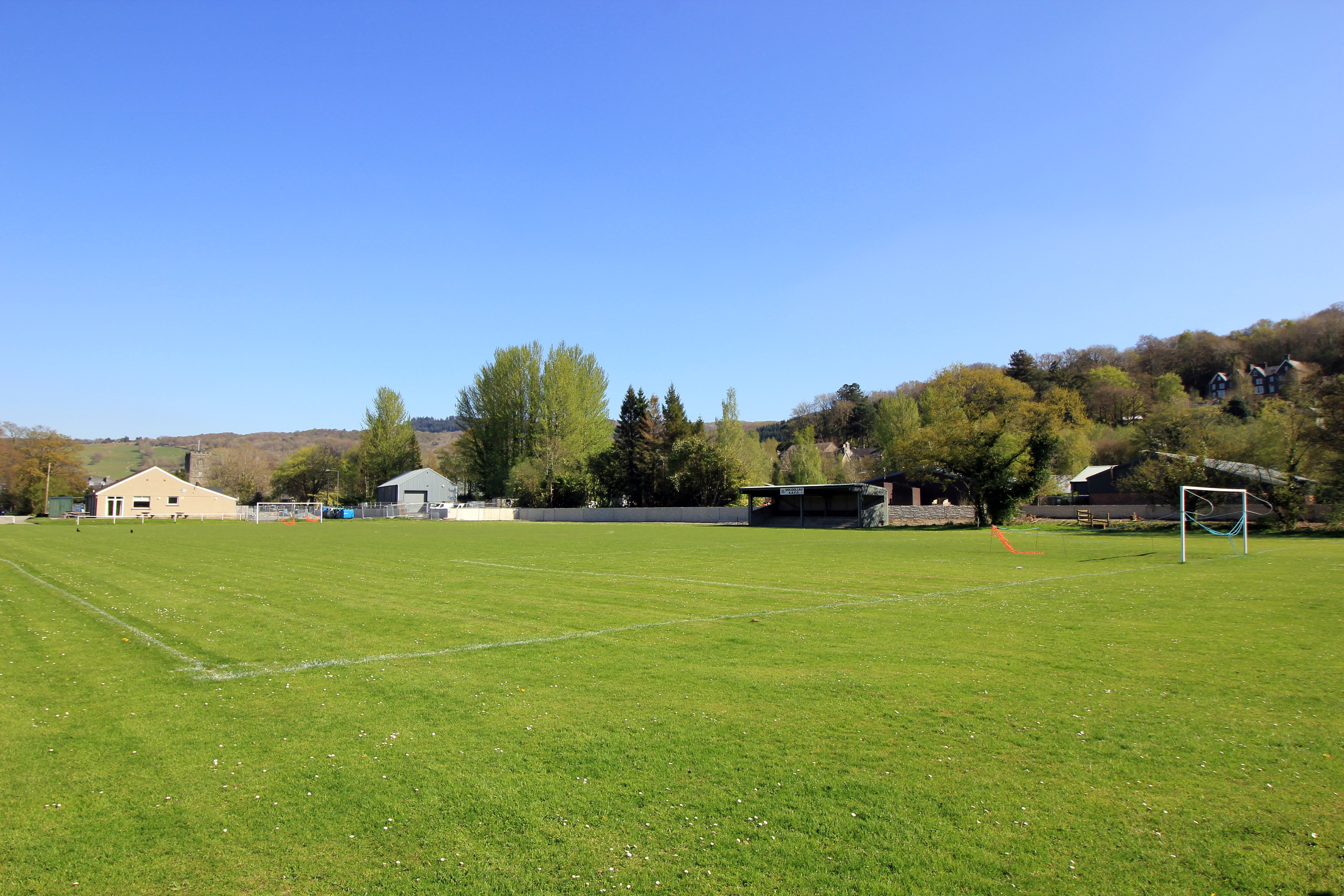
Y Marian pitch

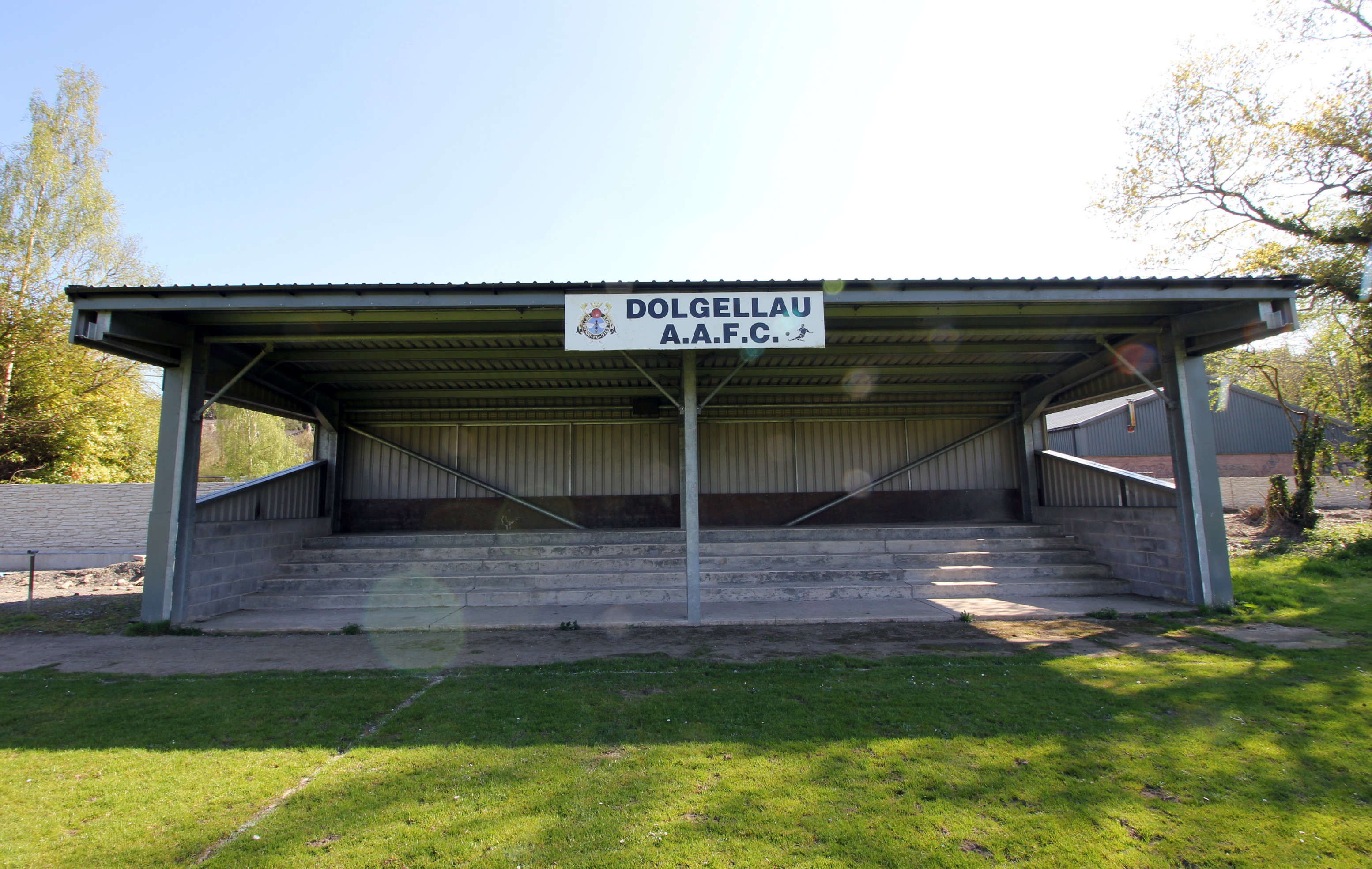
The stand at Y Marian

== Honours ==
- Aberystwyth & District League Cup
  - 1972–73, 1987–88, 2014–15
- Aberystwyth & District League Division One
  - 1980–81, 2008–09, 2015–16
- Aberystwyth & District League Division One Trophy
  - 1998–99
- Aberystwyth & District League Division Two
  - 1987–88
- Aberystwyth & District League Division Two Trophy
  - 1987–88
- J. Emrys Morgan Cup
  - 2001–02
- North Cards Cup
  - 1980–81
- Len & Julia Newman Memorial Cup
  - 2014–15, 2015–16

== Welsh Cup record ==
Season	Round	Opponent	Result
1973/74	Round one	Llansantffraid	1-4
2009/10	Round one	Lex XI	3-5
2010/11	Round one	Llandudno	1-2
2011/12	Qualifying Round one	Gwalchmai	4-6
2012/13	Qualifying Round two	Brickfield Rangers	1-3
2018/19	Round one	Cefn Albion	1-7
2019/20	Qualifying Round two	Caersws	3-5
2021/22	Qualifying Round two	Penrhyndeudraeth	0-3
2022/23	Qualifying Round two	Bow Street	1-2
2023/24	Qualifying Round one	Llandrindod Wells	1-2
2024/25	Qualifying Round one	Bow	1-1 (5-4p)
2025/26	Round three	Caerau Ely	0-2
