= Barmouth & Dyffryn United F.C. =

Association football club in Wales

Barmouth & Dyffryn United
- Full name: Barmouth & Dyffryn United Football Club
- Nickname: Magpies
- Founded: 1863
- Ground: Wern Mynach; Barmouth
- Capacity: 200 seated. ~ 1000 Standing.
- Chairman: Will Huntley
- Manager: Iolo Owen
- League: Central Wales Northern Division
- 2025–26: Central Wales Northern Division, 7th of 15
- Website: http://www.barmouthdyffrynfc.com/
| Home colours | Away colours |

Barmouth & Dyffryn United Football Club (Welsh: Clwb Pêl-Droed Abermaw a Dyffryn) is a Welsh football club based in the coastal town of Barmouth, Gwynedd, also representing the nearby village of Dyffryn Ardudwy. They play in the Central Wales Northern Division. Nicknamed the Magpies, they play their home games at Wern Mynach.

== History ==
The club was founded in 1863, shortly before the formation of the Football Association of Wales, and was one of six inaugural clubs when the Cambrian League was formed in 1896. Little is recorded of this early period. An incarnation of the club reformed in 1901. The Cambrian Coast Football League was founded in January 1920 and Barmouth were league champions in 1920 and 1922. In 1930 an eight-team Cambrian Coast League was revived. It ended in 1963.

Prior to the outbreak of World War II, Barmouth FC and Dyffryn FC were two separate clubs competing in the Cambrian Coast League. Following the ending of hostilities, Barmouth & Dyffryn United was formed as a merger of the two clubs.

Barmouth joined the Central Wales League in 1963 and were champions in the 1969–70 season, also reaching the fifth round of the Welsh Cup, playing Cardiff City F.C. Barmouth won the NWCFA Challenge Cup in 1969 and 1971. They won the Central Wales Challenge Cup in 1973. The club resigned from the Central Wales League at the end of 1972–73 season and reappeared in the Aberystwyth & District League in 1978–79.

Barmouth & Dyffryn left the Aberystwyth & District League at the end of the 1992–93 season and joined the Gwynedd Football League. At the end of the 2000–01 season they withdrew after finishing last but one. They played in the Caernarfon & District League winning the AEEU Cup in 2002 and, after becoming league champions returned to the Gwynedd Football League.

In 2006–07 they were runners-up in the Gwynedd League title but were promoted to the Welsh Alliance League on appeal. They finished tenth in the first full season and fourth in 2009–10.

Ahead of the 2020–21 season, the club moved to the Mid Wales League, having been originally placed in the North Wales Coast West League Premier Division. For the 2023–24 season they were due to play in the third tier Ardal NE, having been promoted from the Central Wales League Northern Division, but withdrew in July 2023, just four days before the start of the season, citing the loss of several key players and an inability to replace them. They were soon accepted back into the Central Wales League.

== Honours ==
Sourced from the club's history page.

=== League ===
- Aberystwyth & District League
  - Champions: 1981–82
  - Runners–up: 1983–84; 1986–87; 1989–90
- Caernarfon & District League
  - Champions: 2002–03
  - Runners–up: 2001–02
  - Division Two – Champions: 2009–10
- Cambrian Coast League
  - Champions: 1919–20; 1921–22; 1954–55
  - Runners-up: 1920–21; 1949–50; 1953–54; 1956–57; 1957–58; 1962–63
- Central Wales League
  - Champions: 1969–70
  - Runners–up: 1972–73
- Gwynedd League
  - Champions: 2006–07
  - Runners–up: 2007–08

=== Cups ===
- Aberystwyth & District League Cup – Winners: 1983–84; 1989–90
- Aberystwyth & District League Cup – Runners-up: 1992–93
- Aberystwyth & District First Division Trophy – Winners: 1988–89
- AEEU Inter League Cup – Winners: 2001–02
- Barmouth Challenge Cup – Winners: 1908–09
- Barritt Cup – Runners-up: 2007–08
- Bert Pritchard Memorial Trophy – Winners: 1981–82; 1983–84
- Cambrian Coast Challenge Cup – Winners: 1952–53
- Cambrian Coast Challenge Cup – Runners-up: 1947–48; 1955–56; 1956–57; 1957–58; 1960–61
- Cambrian Coast League Cup – Winners: 1956–57; 1957–58; 1959–60
- Cambrian Coast League Cup – Runners-Up: 1955–56; 1961–62; 1962–63
- Cambrian Coast Division Two Cup – Winners: 1950–51
- Cambrian Coast Division Two Cup – Runners-up: 1948–49
- Central Wales Challenge Cup – Winners: 1972–73
- Eryri Shield – Winners: 2007–08
- J. Emrys Morgan Cup – Winners: 2022–23, 2024–25
- North Cards Cup – Runners-up: 1981–82
- North Wales Coast Amateur Cup – Winners: 1955–56
- North Wales Coast Challenge Cup – Winners: 1968–69; 1970–71
- North Wales Coast Junior Cup – Winners: 2007–08

== Wern Mynach ==
Wern Mynach is the home ground of Barmouth & Dyffryn United. In 2018 a new stand (named the Tom Hughes Stand), floodlights, and a club shop were unveiled.
