= Penparcau F.C. =

Association football club in Wales

Coordinates: 52°24′12.1″N 4°4′13.5″W

Penparcau Football Club
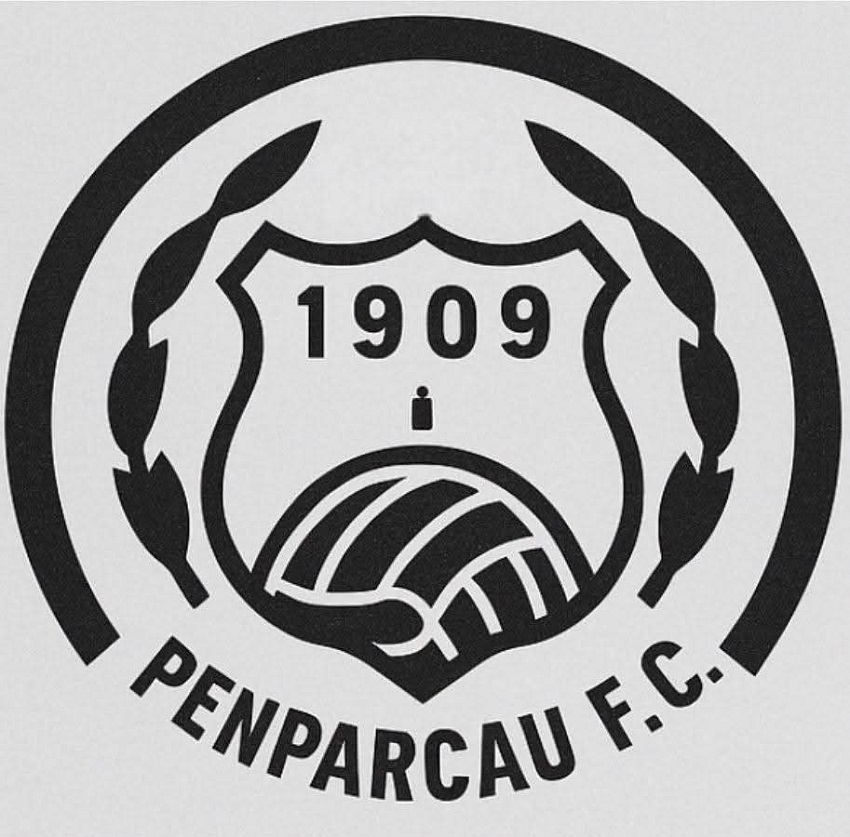
- Full name: Penparcau Football Club
- Nickname: Arky
- Founded: 1909
- Ground: Min-y-Ddol; Penparcau; Aberystwyth; Ceredigion
- Chairman: Cliff Thomas
- League: Aberystwyth League Division One
- 2025–26: Aberystwyth League Division One, 1st of 9
Home colours	Away colours

Penparcau Football Club are a Welsh football club from Penparcau, Ceredigion. They play in the Aberystwyth League Division One.

The club was reformed in the summer of 2017 and played in the Aberystwyth League Division One.

The club's home colours are black and white striped shirt with black shorts and socks

For the 2021–22 season the club played in the tier 3 Ardal North East and finished in 9th position. After the end of the season the club announced they would be withdrawing from the league and for the 2022–23 season would play in the tier 4 Mid Wales Football League South Division. They cited the cost of match officials, as well as the travel expenses for players for away matches, as well as the requirement of a reserve team as their reasons for their departure.

In 2025–26 they won the Aberystwyth League and confirmed a return to tier four.

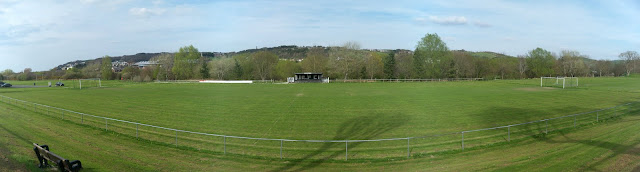

== Honours ==
- Aberystwyth League Division 1 - Champions (12): 1965–66; 1968–69; 1985–86; 1988–89; 1989–90; 1990–91; 1999–2000; 2000–01; 2004–05; 2007–08; 2018–19, 2025–26
- Central Wales Football League Southern Division – Champions: 2023–24
- Mid Wales Football League – Champions (1): 2009–10
- Mid Wales Football League Division 2 - Champions: 2019–20
- J. Emrys Morgan Cup - Winners (2): 2007–08; 2018–19
- J. Emrys Morgan Cup - Runners-up (2): 1988–89; 2001–02
- Len & Julia Newman Trophy - Winners: 2022–23 (reserves), 2025–26
- Aberystwyth League Cup - Winners: 2022–23 (reserves), 2025–26

== Current squad ==
Note: Flags indicate national team as defined under FIFA eligibility rules; some limited exceptions apply. Players may hold more than one non-FIFA nationality.

No.	Pos.	Nation	Player
1	GK	WAL	Lee Jones
21	GK	WAL	Andrew Mackay
2	DF	WAL	Charlie Turner
3	DF	WAL	Gareth Lewis
4	DF	WAL	Daemon Smith
5	DF	WAL	Anthony Evans
6	MF	WAL	Ben Sherbon
7	MF	ENG	Leland Menhenott
8	MF	ENG	Fergus Morris
9	MF	WAL	Daniel Parry
10	FW	WAL	Nathan Pembethy
11	FW	WAL	Nathan Richards

No.	Pos.	Nation	Player
12	FW	WAL	Andrew Gittins
13	FW	WAL	Dylan Bailey
14	MF	WAL	Christian Jones
15	DF	WAL	Jake Bush
16	DF	WAL	James Shields
17	DF	WAL	Terry Davies
18	MF	WAL	Tim Eggoton
19	DF	WAL	Glen Maguire
20	DF	WAL	Josh Ferreira
20	FW	WAL	Kevin 'Chesty' Evans
69	FW	WAL	Iestyn Jones
