= Cefn Albion F.C. =

Association football club in Wales

Coordinates: 53°2′33″N 3°0′55″W

Cefn Albion
- Full name: Cefn Albion Football Club
- Founded: 2014
- Ground: Clywedog Park; Wrexham
- Capacity: 3,500 (500 seated)
- Manager: Phil Hudson
- League: Ardal NE League
- 2025–26 ]: Ardal NE League, 6th of 16
Home colours

Cefn Albion Football Club is a Welsh football club representing the village of Cefn Mawr in Wrexham County Borough. The club was founded in 2014 and plays in the Ardal NE League.

== History ==
The team took its name from an older club also named Cefn Albion who existed from 1967 to 1992, who in turn took their name from an even older team who had existed as far back as 1902. The 1967-1992 club merged with Druids United to form Cefn Druids in 1992.

The team began playing in the 2014–15 season in the Clwyd East Football League (fifth tier). It won the league, scoring 150 goals in 22 games and losing only once. The team also won three cups that season, and lost a fourth in the final.

The following season, the team achieved second consecutive promotion when won it won the Welsh National League Division One.

In October 2015, Cefn Albion player Nicholas Williams broke the leg of AFC Brynford's Andrew Barlow in a league cup game. The following August, he was found guilty of grievous bodily harm and sentenced to a year in custody when the jury decided unanimously that it was a deliberate act.

On 29 September 2018, Cefn Albion defeated FC Queens Park 3–2 to qualify for the Welsh Cup for the first time. On 19 October, in the first round, they defeated Dolgellau Athletic 7–1, to earn a trip to Bangor City in the next stage. There, they lost 6–1 away.

On 16 March 2019, Cefn Albion beat STM Sports 3–1 to reach the FAW Trophy final for the first time in their history. On 13 April, they won the final 4–0 against Pontardawe Town at Park Avenue, Aberystwyth. The semi-final was marred by crowd trouble and both teams ordered to pay fines to the FAW, though accusations that Cefn Albion fans were racist were not proven.

In 2020, the Welsh National League was dissolved and Cefn Albion were placed in the new Ardal Leagues North East, still in the third tier.

== Seasons ==
Season	League											Welsh Cup	FAW Trophy	Other
Season	Tier	Division	P	W	D	L	F	A	Pts	PPG	Pos	Welsh Cup	FAW Trophy	Other
2014-15	5	Clwyd East League	22	21	0	1	150	15	63		1			North East Wales FA Junior (Horace Wynne) Cup Winners
2015-16	4	Welsh National League (Wrexham Area) Division One	24	19	1	4	117	35	58		1	1R		
2016-17	3	Welsh National League (Wrexham Area) Premier Division	26	10	5	11	63	67	35		9	1QR		Premier Division League Cup Winners
2017-18	3	Welsh National League (Wrexham Area) Premier Division	28	16	3	9	73	52	51		4	1QR	4R	
2018-19	3	Welsh National League (Wrexham Area) Premier Division	28	9	6	13	58	69	33		9	2R	Winners	Premier Division League Cup Winners
2019-20	3	Welsh National League (Wrexham Area) Premier Division	20	14	3	3	60	32	45	2.25	2	2QR	2R	Premier Division League Cup Semi-Final

== Honours ==
=== League ===
- Welsh National League Division One

Champions (1): 2015–16

- Clwyd East Football League

Champions (1): 2014–15

=== Cups ===
- FAW Trophy

Winner (1): 2018–19

- Welsh National League Premier Division League Cup

Winner (2): 2016–17, 2018–19

- North East Wales FA Junior (Horace Wynne) Cup

Winner (2): 1976–77, 2014–15

- North East Wales FA Challenge Cup

Winners: 1977–78

- Presidents Cup

Winners: 2014–15

Premier Cup:

Winners: 2014–15

- Clwyd Cup:

Runners-up: 2014–15
