= Bow Street F.C. =

Association football club in Wales

Coordinates: 52°27′8″N 4°1′21″W

Bow Street
- Full name: Bow Street Football Club
- Founded: 1920, 1976 (reformed)
- Ground: Cae Piod, Rhydypennau
- Manager: Gwion ap Dafydd
- League: Ardal NE League
- 2025–26: Ardal NE League, 4th of 16
Home colours	Away colours

Bow Street F.C. (Welsh: Clwb Pêl-droed Bow Street) are a football club from Bow Street in Ceredigion, Wales, about 4 1/2 miles (7.2 km) north-east of Aberystwyth. The first team currently plays in the Ardal NE League. The team are nicknamed the Magpies (Welsh: piod), because the club colours are black and white.

The club's home ground is Cae Piod, in nearby Rhydypennau.

== History ==
Bow Street F.C. was founded some time around 1920, and after two periods of inactivity the club restarted in 1976.

The club won the Aberystwyth League title in each of the following seven seasons: 1992–93, 1994–95, 1995–96, 2001–02, 2002–03, 2003–04 and 2006–07. As well as this they also won the J. Emrys Morgan Cup three times, in 1982–83, 1999–2000 and 2005–06.

After their Aberystwyth League title in 2006–07, Bow Street joined the third-tier Mid Wales Football League, and stayed there until the formation of the Ardal Leagues in 2020. In the 2017–18 season Bow Street won the Mid Wales League Cup.

They were founder members of the Ardal North East, where they finished second in the 2023–24 and 2024–25 seasons.

In 2022–23 they were runners-up in the Ardal North Cup.

Their match at home against Flint Town United in the 2025–26 Welsh Cup second round was selected for coverage on Sgorio. Flint won the game 3–0.

== Honours ==
- Ardal NE – Runners-up: 2023–24, 2024–25
- Aberystwyth League Division One – Champions: 1992–93, 1994–95, 1995–96, 2001–02, 2002–03, 2003–04, 2006–07
- Aberystwyth League Cup – Winners: 1985–86, 1988–89, 1991–92, 1992–93, 1994–95
- J. Emrys Morgan Cup – Winners: 1982–83, 1999–00, 2005–06
- Mid Wales League Cup – Winners: 2017–18
- Ardal North Cup – Runners-up: 2022–23
