= Llechryd F.C. =

Football club based in Ceredigion

Llechryd
- Full name: Llechryd Football Club
- Founded: 2021
- Ground: Llechryd Cricket & Tennis Club
- League: Ceredigion League Premier Division
- 2025–26: Ceredigion League First Division, 1st of 11
Home colours	Away colours

Llechryd Football Club is a Welsh football club based in Llechryd, Ceredigion. The team plays in the Ceredigion League Premier Division.

== History ==
The club was founded in 2021. In its first season it played in the Ceredigion League Division Two, winning all 16 league matches, securing the title and promotion to the league's top division.

In April 2025, Llechryd were beaten 2–1 by Felinfach in the final of the Ceredigion League Cup. In that season, they won the Cwpan Coffa Dai Dynamo Davies and the Percy Eldridge Cup.

In May 2026, Llechryd lifted the Division One title after a 6–1 win against St Dogmaels, with title rivals Crymych and Felinfach drawing 2–2. Llechryd also won the Bay Cup, League Cup and the Percy Eldridge Cup.

The club entered the 2026–27 Welsh Cup and losing 2–0 away to Mumbles Rangers in the first qualifying round.
