= Mond Cup =

- Organiser(s): West Wales Football Association
- Founded: 1925; 101 years ago
- Region: Wales; West Wales
- Most championships: (Wales) Carmarthen Town
- Website: www.wwfa.org.uk

The Mond Cup is a cup competition in Welsh football organised by the West Wales Football Association.

== History ==
The competition was created after Sir Alfred Mond, then the Member of Parliament for Carmarthen, offered a trophy for a new competition between amateur clubs in his constituency. The proposal was approved at a meeting in Carmarthen on 29 December 1925, and twelve clubs entered the inaugural tournament:

Clynderwen United, St Clears, Whitland, Carmarthen Training College, Llandovery Town, St Peters FC, G.W.R. Carmarthen, Gwendraeth United, Tumble, Ponthenry Welfare, Pencader and Bargoed Rangers.

The first final was played at Carmarthen Park on 24 April 1926. Llandovery Town defeated Bargoed Rangers 1–0 before a reported attendance of about 4,000.

It was considered to be one of the oldest domestic cup competitions for Welsh football clubs, after the more well known and prestigious Welsh Cup. Unlike the Welsh Cup, where 135 teams entered in 2008–09, the competition is only open to the members of the West Wales Football Association.

== Format ==
From 1925–26 to 2008–09 the cup was a straight knockout competition. From 2009–10 to 2012–13 the competition consisted of four groups with the winners then making the semi-finals. All ties were then played at Richmond Park, the home ground of Carmarthen Town.

== Winners ==
The first Mond Cup was won by Llandovery Town.

== Past Cup Winners ==
Season-by-season list of winners and runners-up.

Season	Winner	Score	Runner up	Venue
1925–26	Llandovery Town	1–0	Bargoed Rangers	Carmarthen Park
1926–27	Llandovery Town	2–1	Ponthenry	Carmarthen Park
1927–28	Carmarthen Training College	2–1	Llandovery Town	Carmarthen Park
1928–29	Carmarthen Training College	2–1	Pontyates	Carmarthen Park
1929–30	Pontyates	8–2	Carmarthen Training College	Carmarthen Park
1930–31	Carmarthen Training College	2–1 (A.E.T.)	Pontyates	Carmarthen Park
1931–32	Pontyates	2–2, 5–0 (Replay)	St Peter's Rovers	Carmarthen Park
1932–33	Carmarthen Training College	2–0	St Peter's Rovers	Carmarthen Park
1933–34	St Peter's Rovers	3–1	Llandovery A.F.C.	Carmarthen Park
1934–35	St Peter's Rovers	1–0	Llansaint	Carmarthen Park
1935–36	Ponthenry	3–1	Llansaint	Carmarthen Park
1936–37	Pontyates	5–0	Garden Suburbs	Carmarthen Park
1937–38	Pontyates	5–0	Ponthenry	Carmarthen Park
1938–39	Pontyates	2–1	St Peter's Rovers	Carmarthen Park
1939–46	Competition Suspended			
1946–47				
1947–48				
1948–49				
1949–50	Ponthenry	1–1 (Replay)	Newcastle Emlyn	Carmarthen Park
1950–51	Ponthenry	1–0	Carmarthen Town	Carmarthen Park
1951–52	Ponthenry			
1952–53	Ponthenry			
1953–54				
1954–55				
1955–56				
1956–57				
1957–58				
1958–59	Ynysmeudwy Athletic	3–1	HMS Goldcrest	Richmond Park (Carmarthen)
1959–60				
1960–61				
1961–62				
1962–63				
1963–64				
1964–65				
1965–66				
1966–67				
1967–68				
1968–69				
1969–70				
1970–71				
1971–72	Pressed Steel Fisher Sports			
1972–73			Pressed Steel Fisher Sports	
1973–74	Ffostrasol Wanderers			
1974–75	Ffostrasol Wanderers			
1975–76				
1976–77				
1977–78	Carmarthen Town	4–0	Porthyrhyd	
1978–79	Carmarthen Town	6–0	Newcastle Emlyn	Parc Puw, Felindre
1979–80	Carmarthen Town			
1980–81	Carmarthen Town	3–2	Trimsaran	Richmond Park (Carmarthen)
1981–82	Trimsaran		Ammanford AFC	Richmond Park (Carmarthen)
1982–83				
1983–84				
1984–85	Newcastle Emlyn	1–0	Ammanford AFC	Richmond Park (Carmarthen)
1985–86	Newcastle Emlyn	1–1 (A.E.T.), 2–1 (Replay)	Carmarthen Town	Richmond Park (Carmarthen)
1986–87	Carmarthen Town	4–1 (A.E.T.)	Newcastle Emlyn	Richmond Park (Carmarthen)
1987–88	Carmarthen Town	3–0	Newcastle Emlyn	Richmond Park (Carmarthen)
1988–89	Carmarthen Town	2–1	Newcastle Emlyn	Richmond Park (Carmarthen)
1989–90	Carmarthen Town	2–1	St Clears	Richmond Park (Carmarthen)
1990–91	Carmarthen Town	1–0	Llandeilo Town	
1991–92				
1992–93	Carmarthen Town	3–1	Drefach	Richmond Park (Carmarthen)
1993–94				
1994–95				
1995–96	Llandysul	2–1	Kidwelly	Richmond Park (Carmarthen)
1996–97	Carmarthen Town	4–0	Caraway	Richmond Park (Carmarthen)
1997–98	Carmarthen Town (Reserves)	4–1	St. Clears	Bro-Myrddin School Fields (Carmarthen)
1998–99	Carmarthen Town (Reserves)	3–0	Newcastle Emlyn	Carmarthen Park
1999–00				
2000–01	Carmarthen Town		Abergwili	Bro-Myrddin School Fields (Carmarthen)
2001–02				
2002–03				
2003–04	Johnstown			
2004–05	Johnstown		Carmarthen Town	
2005–06				
2006–07				
2007–08				
2008–09				
2009–10	Carmarthen Town	2–0	Ammanford AFC	Richmond Park (Carmarthen)
2010–11	Carmarthen Town		Pencader	Richmond Park (Carmarthen)
2011–12	Llansteffan		Pencader	Richmond Park (Carmarthen)
2012–13	Ponthenri	1–0	Ammanford AFC	Richmond Park (Carmarthen)
2013–14	St Clears	3-3 (3-2 on Pens)	Caerbryn	Richmond Park (Carmarthen)
2014–15	No Competition	N/A	N/A	N/A

== See also ==
- Football in Wales
- Welsh football league system
- Welsh Cup
- FAW Premier Cup
- List of football clubs in Wales
- List of stadiums in Wales by capacity
