= Old Shire Hall, Cardigan =

Municipal building in Cardigan, Wales

- Hen Neuadd y Sir Aberteifi (Welsh)
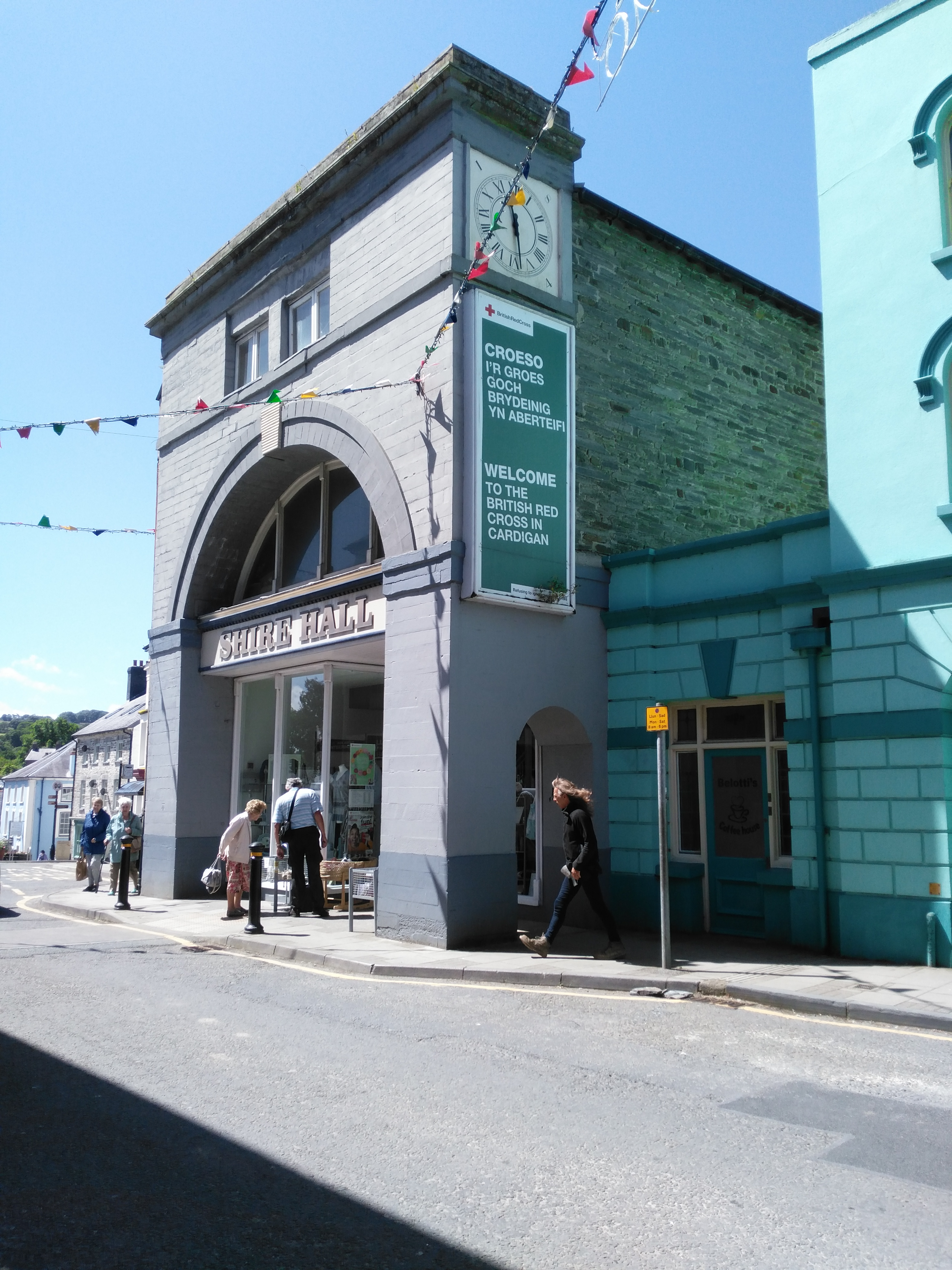
- The building in 2018

- Shown in Ceredigion
- 52.0821°N 4.6615°W
- Location: High Street, Cardigan

History
- Built: 1764

Site notes
- Architectural style: Neoclassical style

Listed Building – Grade II*
- Official name: Old Shire Hall
- Designated: 16 June 1961
- Reference no.: 10488

The Old Shire Hall (Welsh: Hen Neuadd y Sir Aberteifi) is a former judicial building in the High Street in Cardigan, Ceredigion, Wales. The structure, which is now used as a British Red Cross shop, is a Grade II* listed building.

== History ==
The building was commissioned as a courthouse for the county of Cardiganshire, to replace the inadequate judicial facilities in Cardigan Castle. The site the justices selected, on the west side of the High Street, had been occupied by the Church of the Holy Trinity.

The shire hall was designed in the neoclassical style, built in rubble masonry with an ashlar stone frontage and was completed in 1764. The design involved a narrow main frontage facing onto the High Street with long side elevations stretching back behind the main frontage. It featured a two-storey arch formed by two piers with imposts supporting a series of voussoirs and a raised keystone. Above the arch, there was a band which was surmounted by two rectangular attic windows in a recess. At roof level, there was a frieze, a cornice and a parapet, and there was originally also a small bell turret. Internally, there was a corn exchange on the ground floor and a courtroom on the first floor.

The courtroom was used twice year for the quarter sessions, which were also held once a year at Aberystwyth Town Hall and at the Lampeter Town Hall. The building was enlarged to create a room for the grand jury in 1829.

The courtroom ceased to be used for judicial purposes once Cardigan Guildhall was completed in 1860, and the use of the ground floor as a corn exchange declined significantly in the wake of the Great depression of British agriculture in the late 19th century. The building was therefore sold for commercial use: it served as a garage and motor repair shop, operated by S. T. Jones, from 1926 to 1947, and then served as a furniture shop operated by a firm of drapers, David Jones Watts. It was later used as a warehouse and then as a bookshop, known as Bookend. Since 2015, it has served as a charity shop for the British Red Cross.

== See also ==
- Grade II* listed buildings in Ceredigion
