= Pencader United F.C. =

Football club based in Carmarthenshire

Pencader United
- Full name: Pencader United Football Club
- Nickname: The Reds
- Founded: 1982
- Ground: Pencader Park
- League: Ceredigion League First Division
- 2024–25: Ceredigion League Second Division, 1st of 10 (promoted)
Home colours	Away colours

Pencader United F.C. is a Welsh football club based in Pencader, Carmarthenshire. The team plays in the Ceredigion League First Division.

== History ==
Football was played in Pencader as early as 1890. In 1914 a Pencader Football Club was active.

Pencader United Football Club was formed in 1982, replacing an earlier club named Pencader FC which was active during the 1960s and 1970s. In 1984 Pencader United joined the Ceredigion League.

The club's first successes were in 1993–94, with the first team winning Division Two and the reserves winning the Reserves Cup. This was followed by a second Division Two title, as well as the Ceredigion Cup, in 1998–99.

At the start of the 2001–02 season there were rumours of Pencader possibly merging with nearby Llandysul. However this did not happen, and at the end of the season they beat Llandysul 3–1 to win the Ceredigion Cup. That season they also won the Division Two title for a third time, two points clear of RAE Aberporth.

In April 2005 the club were fined £200 (half suspended to the end of the next season) for their part in a "mass brawl" in an under-18 match against St Dogmaels. However the club still won their fourth Division Two title that season.

In 2007–08 and 2009–10 the club won doubles of Division Two and the South Cards Cup, and in 2010–11 won the Bay Cup, having lost in the final in the previous season. In 2011–12 they won the Mond Cup.

In February 2013 the club was on the brink of folding due to a shortage of players. The club did end up withdrawing from the league, having gained 7 points from their 9 games played by that point. In 2014 the club returned to the league, and won the Division Two title in their first season.

In 2017 the club won the South Cards Cup for the first time since 2010.

In 2025 Pencader were crowned Division Two champions, their eighth title.

== Honours ==
- Ceredigion League Division Two - Champions: 1993–94, 1998–99, 2001–02, 2004–05, 2007–08, 2009–10, 2014–15, 2024–25
- Ceredigion League Reserves Cup - Winners: 1993–94
- Ceredigion Cup - Winners: 1998–99, 2001–02
- South Cards Cup - Winners: 2007–08, 2009–10, 2016–17
- Bay Cup - Winners: 2010–11
- Mond Cup - Winners: 2011–12
