= Padarn United F.C. =

Football club based in Ceredigion

Padarn United
- Full name: Padarn United Football Club
- Founded: 1895
- Ground: Llety Gwyn
- League: Aberystwyth League Division One
- 2024–25: Aberystwyth League Division One, 6th of 7
Home colours	Away colours

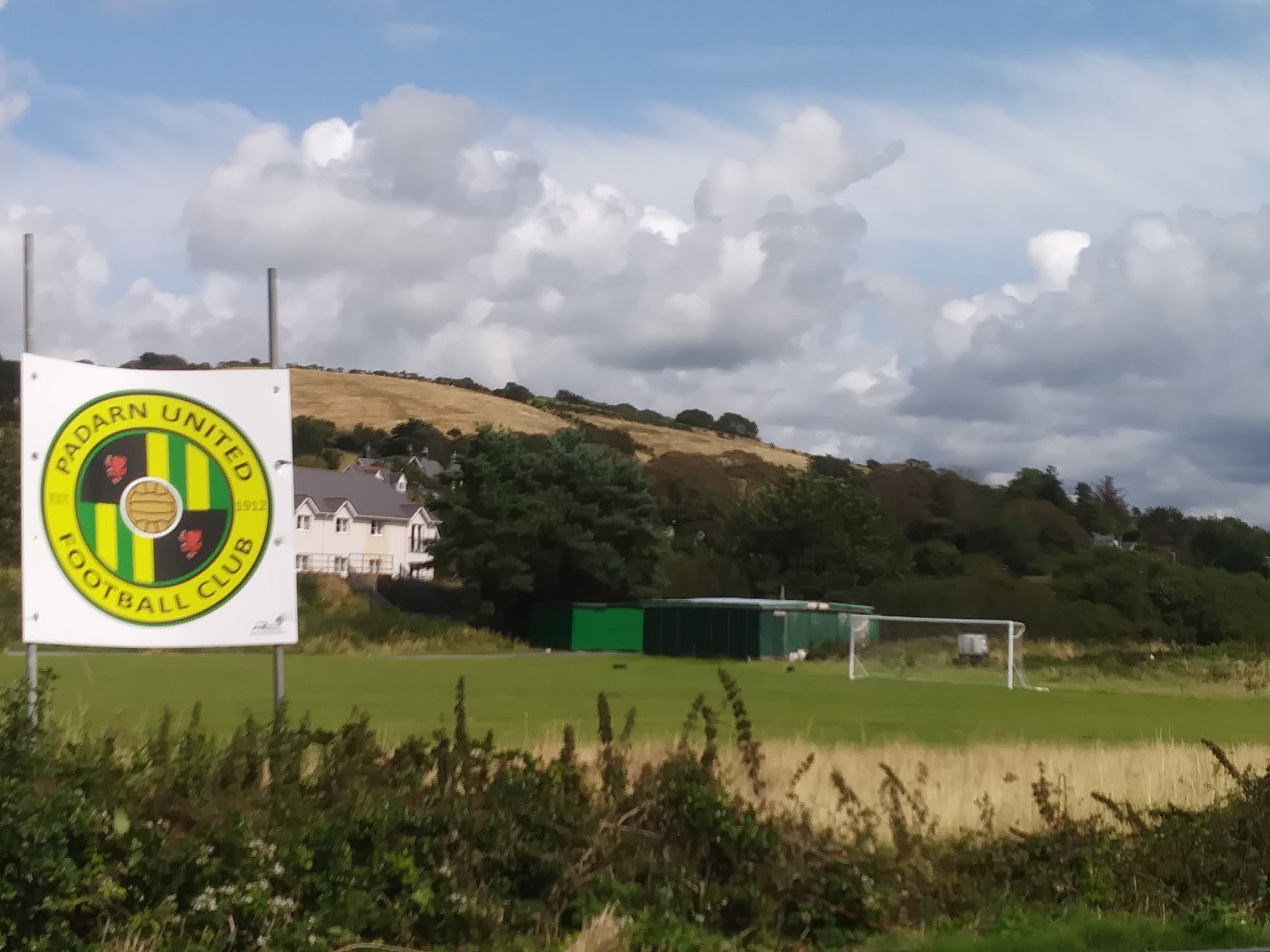
Llety Gwyn, the home ground of Padarn United F.C.

Padarn United F.C. is a Welsh football club based in Llanbadarn Fawr, Ceredigion. The team currently plays in the Aberystwyth League Division One.

== History ==
Padarn United are known to have existed as early as 1895, playing friendlies against other local teams in the Aberystwyth area. For the 1906–07 season, Padarn played in the Aberystwyth Junior League.

In 1921, Padarn were founder members of the Cardiganshire League, where they won the league title in 1923–24. In 1934 they were founder members of the Aberystwyth League.

In 1988 Padarn United won the Aberystwyth League and were runners-up to Maesglas in the South Cards Cup.

In 1997 Padarn United were again champions of the Aberystwyth League. This title was in the same season they won the J. Emrys Morgan Cup, beating Llanrhystud in the final, as well as the North Cards Cup where they beat Penrhyncoch reserves in the final, and the South Cards Cup where they beat Llandysul in the final. After their successful 1996–97 season, Padarn United gained promotion to the Mid Wales Football League, where they would finish second in their only season.

After leaving the Mid Wales League, Padarn rejoined the Aberystwyth League, finishing eighth in their first season after returning.

== Club colours ==
Padarn's club colours are yellow and green. As of 2024 they play in yellow shirts and green shorts.

== Honours ==
- Cardiganshire League - Champions: 1923–24
- Aberystwyth League - Champions: 1987–88, 1996–97
- Mid Wales Football League - Runners-up: 1997–98
- J. Emrys Morgan Cup - Winners: 1996–97
- North Cards Cup - Winners: 1996–97
- South Cards Cup - Winners: 1996–97
- South Cards Cup - Runners-up: 1987–88
