= Cardigan, Ceredigion =

Town and community in Wales

Cardigan: Welsh: Aberteifi
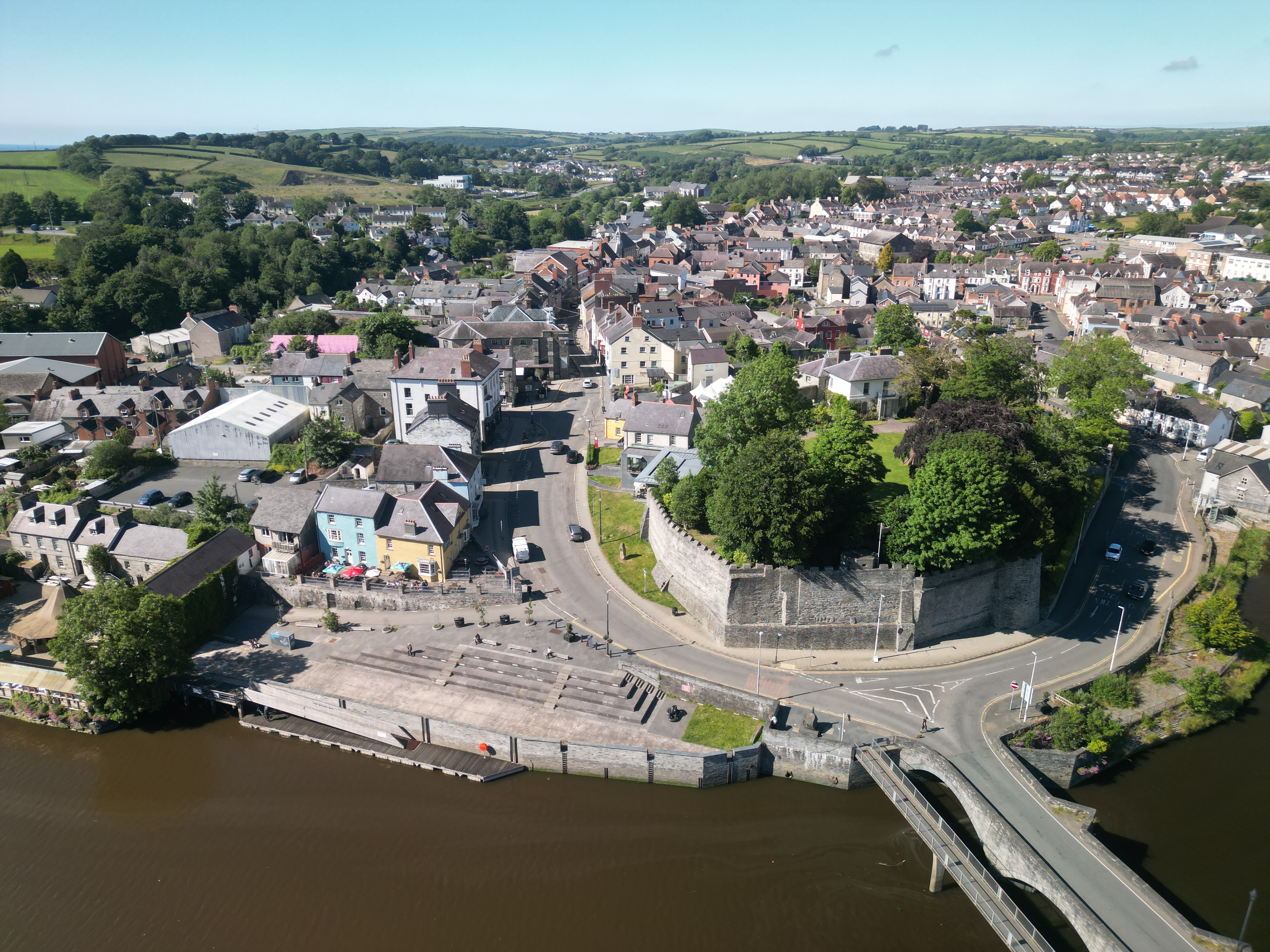
- View of the centre of Cardigan. The River Teifi is in the foreground and Cardigan Castle above on the right.

- Location within Ceredigion
- Population: 4,216 (2021)
- OS grid reference: SN175465
- Principal area: Ceredigion
- Preserved county: Dyfed
- Country: Wales
- Sovereign state: United Kingdom
- Post town: CARDIGAN
- Postcode district: SA43
- Dialling code: 01239
- Police: Dyfed-Powys
- Fire: Mid and West Wales
- Ambulance: Welsh
- UK Parliament: Ceredigion Preseli
- Senedd Cymru – Welsh Parliament: Ceredigion Penfro
- List of places UK Wales Ceredigion 52.08417°N 4.65792°W Community map: Map of the community

Cardigan (Welsh: Aberteifi, pronounced [abɛrˈtei̯vi]) is a town and community in the county of Ceredigion, Wales. It is positioned on the tidal part of the River Teifi on the border with Pembrokeshire, and had a population of 4,216 at the 2021 census.

A castle was established at what would become Cardigan by the Anglo-Norman Gilbert Fitz Richard in 1110; a castle built following an earlier incursion in 1093 was short-lived. Cardigan was recaptured by the Welsh in 1164 or 1165, and the castle was rebuilt in stone by Rhys ap Gruffudd c. 1171–76. Rhys held a gathering of bards at Cardigan in 1176 that was later recognised as the first eisteddfod. The town came under English rule for the final time in the early thirteenth century. A weekly market was established in 1277, and a borough charter was granted in 1284.

Cardigan lent its name to the historic county of Cardiganshire, which was established in 1283. It became the administrative centre of the county and hosted the courts of assize from 1536. Cardigan Castle was used as a courtroom and prison until it was replaced by a new Shire Hall in 1764, and county gaol in 1793, the latter to designs by John Nash. The town, which had always engaged in maritime trade, was successful as a port from the seventeenth to the early twentieth centuries; at its height the Port of Cardigan had jurisdiction over Newport, Fishguard, Aberaeron, Aberporth and Newquay and had 291 registered vessels. The town is no longer the county's administrative centre, Ceredigion County Council being based in Aberaeron, but the council maintains offices in Cardigan.

The town is bypassed to the east by the A487 road, which links Haverfordwest with Bangor. It has a junction with the A478 road to Tenby immediately south of the suburb of Bridgend, on the south side of the Teifi.

== Toponymy ==
Cardigan is an anglicisation of the Welsh Ceredigion ("Ceredig's land"), the surrounding territory its Norman castle once controlled. Ceredig was supposedly one of the sons of Cunedda Wledig, who Welsh legend records invaded from the north to recover lands in Roman Britain from invading Irishmen in late antiquity.

The Welsh name Aberteifi refers to its position by the mouth (aber) of the River Teifi.

== History ==
=== Roman Britain ===
The nearest known Roman fort is Bremia at the gold mines near Llanio above the River Teifi on the Sarn Helen road.

=== Middle ages ===
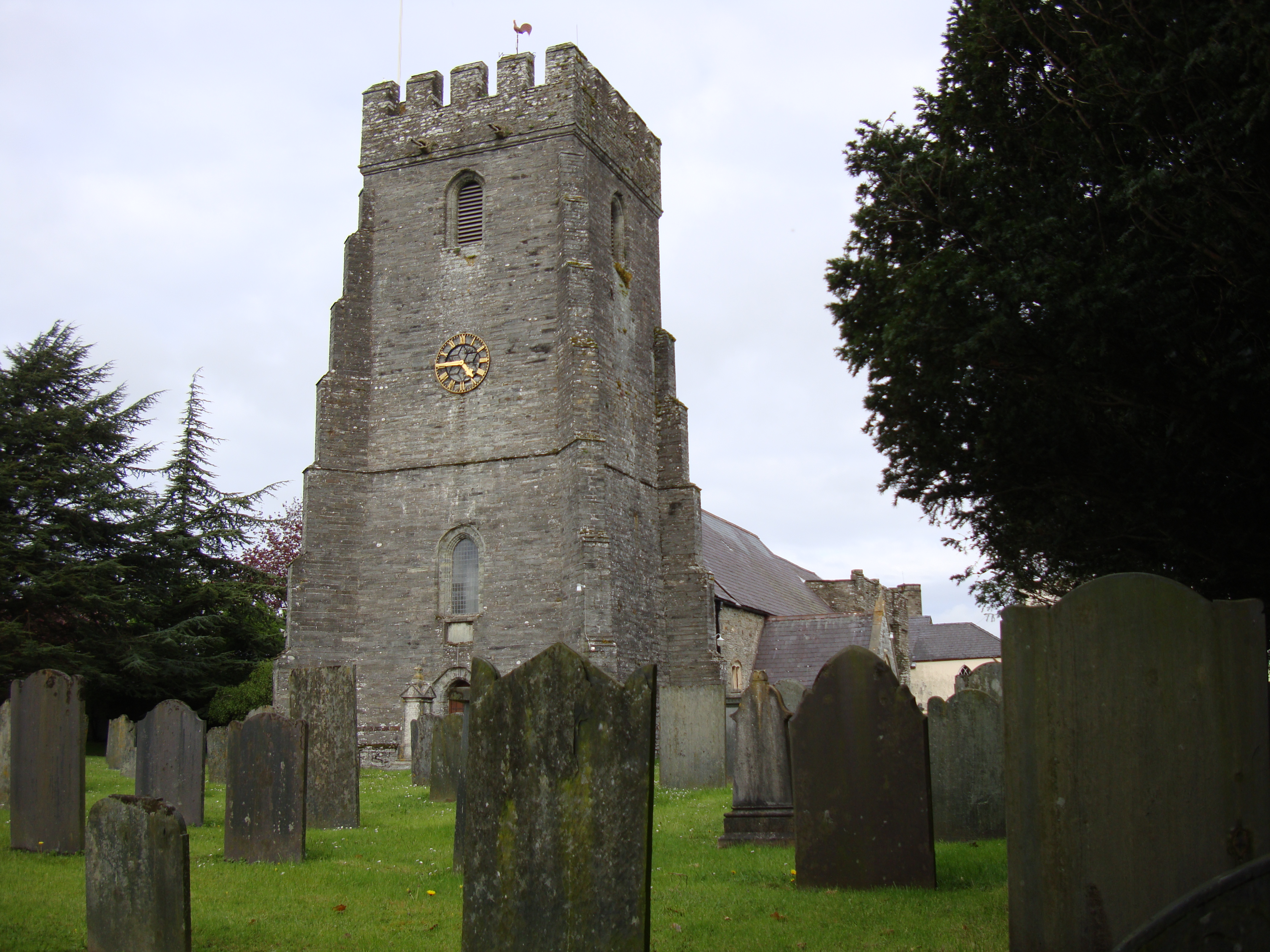
Parish Church of St Mary

The present town grew up near the medieval forts established to control the access of the Teifi and its confluents to Cardigan Bay on the Irish Sea. A castle was built by Roger de Montgomery in 1093 after a Norman army conquered Ceredigion. Its hinterland was regained by Owain Gwynedd, Cadwaladr ap Gruffydd, and Gruffydd ap Rhys in October 1136 after their victory at Crug Mawr over Norman forces army led by Robert fitz Martin and Robert fitz Stephen and Maurice FitzGerald. Rhys ap Gruffydd fortified the town and was credited with the establishment of the castle near the bridge over the Teifi. In 1176, he instituted the first eisteddfod. Contestants came from all over the British Isles to compete for chairs in music and poetry. Some years later, Rhys's grandson Maelgwn razed the castle and sacked the town, but repairs were soon effected.

Cardigan became an important trade centre. In 1227 a weekly market was established which continues to this day. Welsh rule over Cardigan continued, for some periods under royal lordship, until it was annexed to the English crown in 1283 when the county of Cardiganshire was created. The town wall was built in the 1240s and the castle was rebuilt. St Mary's Church was established as a Benedictine Priory and parish church in mediaeval times and survived the Dissolution of the Monasteries. The castle ceased being the administrative centre of the county with the Act of Union in 1536 and by the early 17th century was already falling into ruins.

=== Early modern period ===
A small Benedictine priory operated until the Reformation and the more important abbey of St Dogmael's was also nearby. With Wales formally annexed by England through the Laws in Wales Acts, political and domestic stability boosted economic prosperity through the increase in maritime trade. At the end of the 16th century the port's principal trade was fishing, but over the next century trade expanded to include a range of imports and exports, and a Customs House was established to collect revenues.

During the Civil War, the town's castle was held for a time by the Royalists. In the 17th century, the residence erected around the old priory was famed as the home of Orinda (Catherine Philips), the friend of Jeremy Taylor.

The herring fishery developed and by the beginning of the 18th century there was a large merchant fleet. Exports included herring and salmon, slate, bark for tanning, corn and ale. Imports included oranges, manufactured goods, building materials and coal. Industries that developed included shipbuilding, brickworks, a foundry, ropemakers and sailmakers.

A county jail was erected in 1793.

In 1819, the ship Albion left Cardigan for New Brunswick, carrying the first Welsh settlers to Canada; on board were 27 Cardigan families, many of whom were farmers.

=== Town centre ===
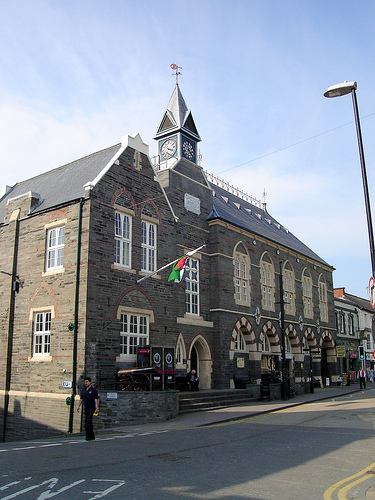
Cardigan Guildhall, built in the Gothic style and opened in 1860

In the 18th and early 19th century, Cardigan was the commercial centre of its county and the most important port in South Wales, exporting slate, oats, barley, and butter. In 1815, it possessed 314 ships totaling 12,554 long tons (12,755 t). This was seven times as many vessels as Cardiff and three times as many as Swansea. It had a thriving shipbuilding industry, with over 200 vessels being built both in Cardigan and downstream in the village of Llandudoch (St Dogmaels). By mid-century, it was connected with the Welsh rail network but its harbour was obstructed by a sand bar that made it dangerous for vessels over 300 tons burden except during the high spring tides.

Rural industries and craftsmen were an important part of life in a country town. Information recorded in Trade Directories show that in 1830 there were Thirteen boot makers, three bakers, one miller, four blacksmiths, seven carpenters, two coopers, six tailors, five dressmakers and milliners, two straw hat makers, two weavers, three curriers, three saddlers, two whitesmiths, four glaziers, five maltsters, two printers, two tanners and one stonemason. The houses were mostly of slate and the streets narrow, steep, and irregular, with a grammar school erected in 1804 and a national school in 1848. The town also had a public library.

Cardigan Guildhall was built between 1858 and 1860 on the site of the old grammar school and a house with a coach-house owned by Abraham Morgan. The cost of building was £1,880 5s for the front buildings, and £2,174 15s for the markets.

By the mid-19th century there were more than 60 taverns in the town. The decline of the port was hastened by the coming of the railway in 1886. The river silted up and larger vessels could no longer reach the port, which had largely become inactive by the early part of the 20th century. Some test dredging was carried out in 2009.

For the last 40 years of the 20th century, a factory in the town made 35,000 pairs of jeans per week for Marks & Spencer, but closed in 2002 with the loss of 400 jobs when M&S sourced from overseas. A new jeans manufacturer—the Hiut Denim Company—opened in 2012, employing some of the original staff and in 2017 became globally recognised for its connection with Meghan Markle.

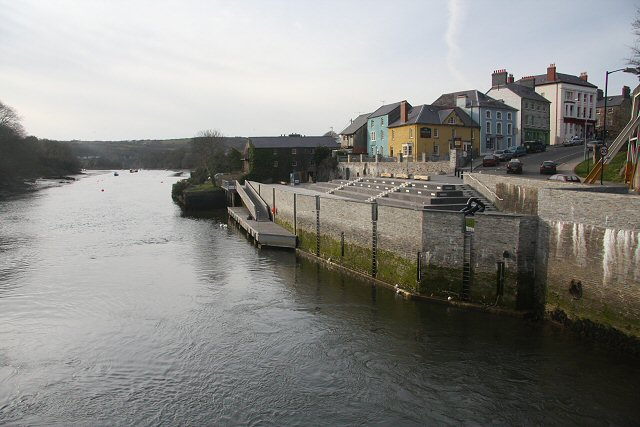
Prince Charles Quay, Cardigan

In 2006 and 2008, the town undertook a coordinated programme of building works, sympathetically restoring many of the shop facades in the town centre. The quayside has been rebuilt with a new civic area and landing stage.

Until 2011, traders in Cardigan were represented by the Chamber of Commerce. Cardigan Traders' Group was set up in that year, attracting half of the members of the Chamber of Commerce. The new group was set to meet in February 2011 to decide how to proceed.

Cardigan was named one of the best places to live in Wales in 2017.

Cardigan and District Community Hospital closed in 2019, after outpatient services were transferred to Cardigan Integrated Health Centre. The future of the former hospital site is under discussion.

== Geography ==
Cardigan lies astride the Afon Teifi and is the last bridging point of the river before the sea 3 miles (5 km) northwest. It is 77 miles (120 km) northwest of Cardiff and 198 miles (319 km) from London. The majority of the town was north of the river before the 20th century. Afon Mwldan which flows south to the west of the town centre has suffered from pollution. The town and rivers are prone to flooding. An earthquake of magnitude 4.4 was felt in the community on 17 February 2018; this was the biggest UK earthquake in ten years.

Glaciolacustrine clay from local brick pits in Bath House Road and on the site of King George's field was used for brick-making until the early 20th century.

=== Climate ===
Cardigan experiences a maritime climate with comfortable summers and cold winters. The nearest Met Office weather station for which online records are available is at Aberporth approximately 6 miles (9.7 km) east-northeast.

Typically, fewer than 3 days of the year will reach a value above 25.0 °C (77.0 °F). The highest temperature recorded at Aberporth was 32.7 °C (90.9 °F), on 19 July 2006. On average 18.3 nights will report air frost and the coldest night of the year should fall to −4.45 °C (23.99 °F). The coldest month was January 1963, with a mean minimum temperature of −9.9 °C (14.2 °F).

Rainfall averages around 890 mm (35 in) per year, with at least 1 mm (0.04 in) falling on 146.4 days.

Climate data for Aberporth 133 m (436 ft) amsl, 1981–2010. Extremes 1960–present (weather station 6 mi (9.7 km) ENE of Cardigan 10 m (33 ft) amsl)
Month	Jan	Feb	Mar	Apr	May	Jun	Jul	Aug	Sep	Oct	Nov	Dec	Year
Record high °C (°F)	13.4 (56.1)	15.2 (59.4)	21.0 (69.8)	25.6 (78.1)	26.6 (79.9)	31.5 (88.7)	32.7 (90.9)	31.5 (88.7)	25.2 (77.4)	22.0 (71.6)	17.0 (62.6)	14.1 (57.4)	32.7 (90.9)
Mean daily maximum °C (°F)	7.6 (45.7)	7.4 (45.3)	9.1 (48.4)	11.1 (52.0)	14 (57)	16.4 (61.5)	18.2 (64.8)	18.2 (64.8)	16.4 (61.5)	13.4 (56.1)	10.2 (50.4)	8.1 (46.6)	12.5 (54.5)
Mean daily minimum °C (°F)	3.1 (37.6)	2.7 (36.9)	4.1 (39.4)	5.3 (41.5)	7.9 (46.2)	10.4 (50.7)	12.3 (54.1)	12.5 (54.5)	11 (52)	8.6 (47.5)	5.8 (42.4)	3.6 (38.5)	7.3 (45.1)
Record low °C (°F)	−13 (9)	−7.5 (18.5)	−6.6 (20.1)	−2.0 (28.4)	0.1 (32.2)	1.7 (35.1)	5.6 (42.1)	5.5 (41.9)	3.3 (37.9)	−0.9 (30.4)	−5.0 (23.0)	−6.0 (21.2)	−13 (9)
Average precipitation mm (inches)	83.7 (3.30)	57.7 (2.27)	62.4 (2.46)	52.9 (2.08)	54.1 (2.13)	58.3 (2.30)	61.4 (2.42)	68.5 (2.70)	71.4 (2.81)	112.1 (4.41)	108.8 (4.28)	96.4 (3.80)	887.7 (34.96)
Average rainy days	15	10.7	12.2	10.6	10.5	9.2	9.8	10.6	11.9	15.6	15.6	14.7	146.4
Average relative humidity (%)	84	83	82	81	80	82	83	83	82	82	84	83	82
Mean monthly sunshine hours	63.1	83	120	177.6	217.4	206.4	199.1	184.1	146.8	105.6	64.4	53.2	1,620.7
Source 1: Met Office
Source 2: weather 2 (January record low and humidity)

== Cardigan Castle ==
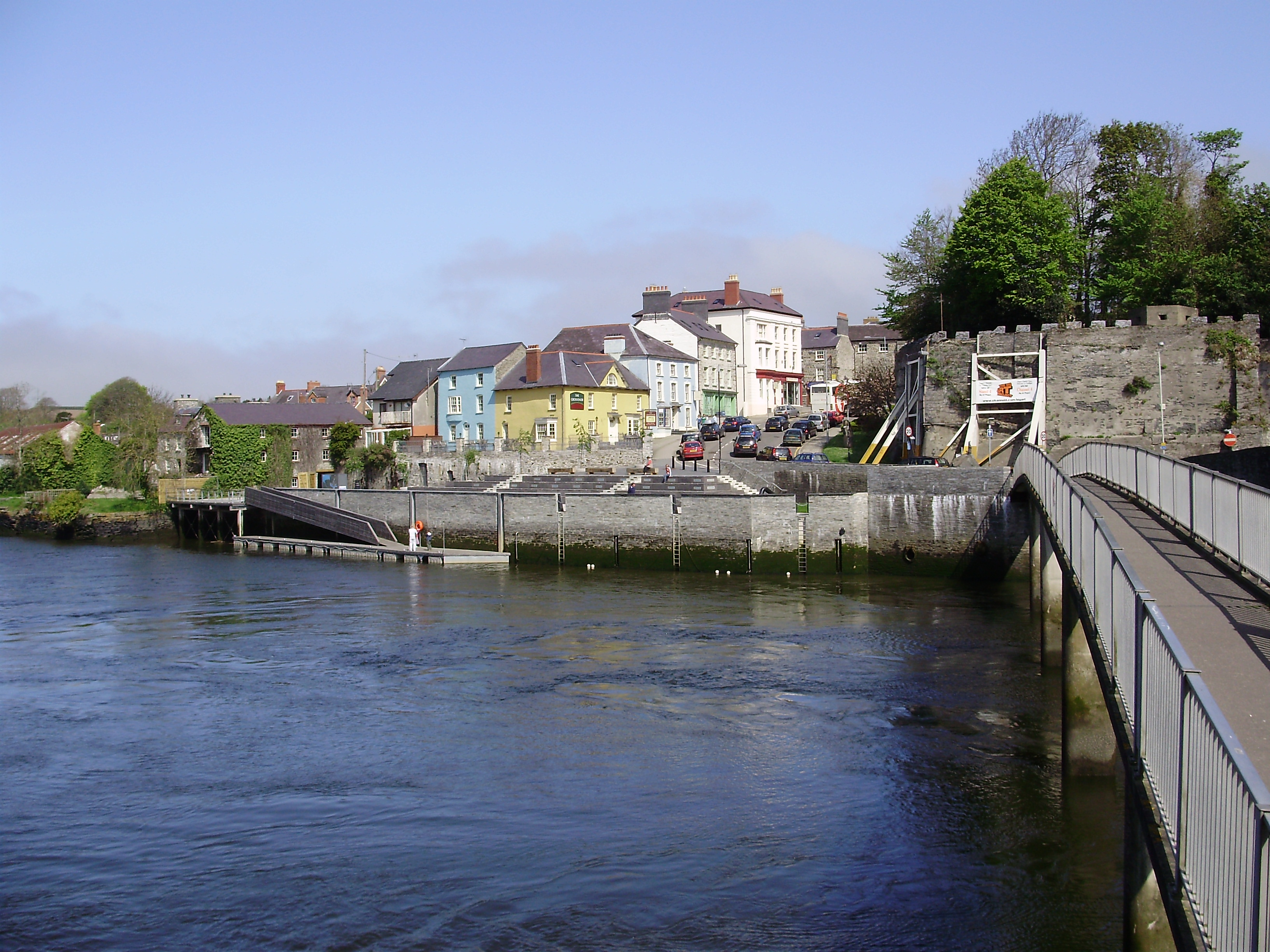
Cardigan looking north across the River Teifi with the castle on the right

In 1176, Cardigan Castle became the site of the first competitive Eisteddfod. Cardigan also hosted the National Eisteddfod of Wales in 1942 and 1976. The castle was for many years privately owned and became run down and derelict. The town council itself showed little interest in saving it. However, a group of volunteers and the local Catholic priest, Seamus Cunane, working separately, did raise its profile. Ceredigion County Council bought it in 2003. The castle and house underwent restoration in 2014.

The castle is open to the public. There is luxury accommodation for hire, a heritage centre with education facilities, a restaurant, an events and open-air concert area, and there are rooms for hire for classes.

== Listed buildings ==
Including the castle (Grade I-listed) and the old bridge (Grade II*), there are over 100 listed buildings in Cardigan community, most in the town itself. These include the Old Shire Hall which is Grade II* listed.

== Demographics ==
Cardigan is the second largest town in Ceredigion with 4,203 inhabitants (2001), reducing slightly to 4,184 at the 2011 census.

At the 2001 census more than 69% of the residents were recorded as being able to speak or understand spoken Welsh, with 45% able to speak, read and write in the language. In 2011 54.6% were able to speak Welsh. In 1176, and again 800 years later, the National Eisteddfod was held in the town (also in 1942). In 2003 the community, together with the Welsh Language Board, set up a language action plan designed to provide opportunities for people of all ages to get together to speak Welsh.

== Governance ==
There are two tiers of local government covering Cardigan, at community (town) and county level: Cardigan Town Council (Cyngor Tref Aberteifi) and Ceredigion County Council (Cyngor Sir Ceredigion). The town council meets at Ty Cadwgan at Cardigan Castle, and has its offices at 36 Pendre. Cardigan Town Council comprises thirteen councillors. Following the 2017 election the council was unique in Wales for having a female majority (seven women, six men).

=== Administrative history ===
Cardigan was an ancient parish, also known as St Mary's after its parish church. The town was administered as a borough from 1284, when it received its first municipal charter.

In 1832, the Cardigan constituency was enlarged to include the Bridgend and Abbey hamlets of the parish of St Dogmaels on the south side of the River Teifi in Pembrokeshire. The borough of Cardigan was reformed to become a municipal borough in 1836 under the Municipal Corporations Act 1835, which standardised how most boroughs operated across the country; as part of those reforms the borough was enlarged to match the constituency. The borough then straddled Cardiganshire and Pembrokeshire until 1889, when the Local Government Act 1888 directed that boroughs could no longer straddle county boundaries, and so the borough was placed entirely in Cardiganshire.

The Cardiganshire assizes were held at Cardigan Castle until 1763 when they transferred to Shire Hall on High Street. In 1889, Cardiganshire County Council was formed; unlike the assizes, it chose to hold its meetings alternately at Lampeter Town Hall and Aberaeron Town Hall. Levi James, one of the town's two inaugural county councillors, was immediately made an alderman and became the second chairman of the council.

The borough of Cardigan was abolished in 1974 under the Local Government Act 1972. A community called Cardigan was created instead, covering the area of the abolished borough. District-level functions passed to Ceredigion District Council, which was in turn replaced in 1996 by Ceredigion County Council. Some of the parts of the old parish of St Dogmaels which had been included in Cardigan borough in 1836 were returned to Pembrokeshire in 2003.

== Amenities ==
The town has several health centres, a college, modern arts centre (with three-screen cinema), theatre and recently refurbished 19th century guildhall housing market stalls. For shopping there are supermarkets, town centre shops and several trading estates.

=== Education ===
Cardigan's college, Coleg Ceredigion, is located north of the town centre and educates 700 full-time and 2,000 part-time students in both Welsh and English languages, and is Ceredigion's only further education college. The college became a constituent college of the University of Wales Trinity Saint David. In a special ceremony at the guildhall, the university's vice-chancellor, Prof Medwin Hughes, chair of the university council, Ven Randolph Thomas and Dr. Brinley Jones, president of UWTSD officially welcomed Coleg Ceredigion to the UWTSD group.

The college and Cardigan Secondary School, Ysgol Uwchradd Aberteifi share the same site. Ysgol Gynradd Gymunedol Aberteifi was established in 2008 when the former Cardigan Infant and Cardigan Junior schools were combined. The school educates more than 300 pupils.

=== Worship ===
The parish church is dedicated to St Mary.

Cardigan is the site of Our Lady of Cardigan, a Roman Catholic shrine, also known as the shrine to Our Lady of the Taper.

Other churches include:

- Bethania Welsh Baptist Church, on William Street, first built in 1775–76 but modified in 1819, 1843 and finally in 1846–47 to the design of architect Daniel Evans of Cardigan.
- Mount Zion Baptist Church, which was built in 1878 in mixed Romanesque/Lombardic style, to the design of architect George Morgan of Carmarthen. It is Grade II listed.
- Tabernacl Methodist Chapel, built in 1760, rebuilt in 1807 and 1832, restored and extended by architect Lloyd Edwards in 1886. The body of the present chapel, dated 1832, is built in Romanesque style but was deeply altered in 1902 with a large projecting central organ chamber, flanking porches and new stucco cladding, and in 1986 when the pyramid roof was modified to a flatter design.

There is also a small Islamic centre on Quay Street called the "Cardigan Islamic Cultural Centre". It serves the local Muslim community in the town.

=== Leisure activities ===
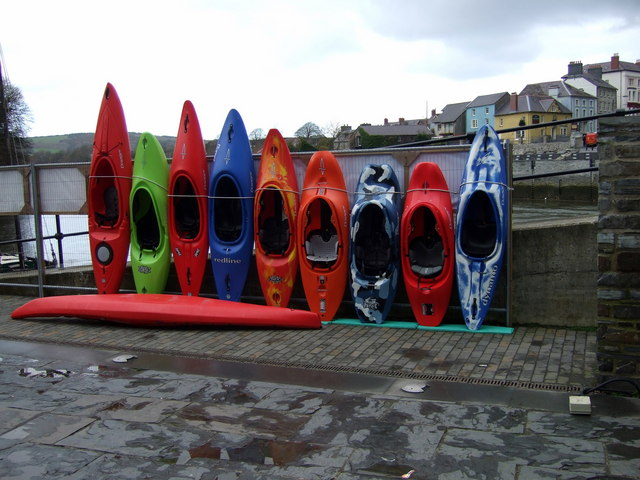
Kayaks by the Teifi

There is a leisure centre in the grounds of the college offering sport and fitness facilities, and a swimming pool and leisure complex (a registered charity opened in 1977) in Napier Street. A public library was situated in 'Canolfan Teifi' near the guildhall, but, in July 2017 moved to the local Council Offices on Morgan Street.

=== Sport ===
The town has two association football clubs - Cardigan Town and Maesglas, both competing in the Ceredigion League.

Cardigan Rugby Football Club was founded in 1876 and plays in WRU Division Two West. It is a feeder club for the Llanelli Scarlets.

Cardigan Golf Club is a 6,500-yard 18 hole clifftop course at Gwbert, north of the town. The current clubhouse was opened in 1977 but the links course originated with 9 holes in 1895.

A blue plaque was put up at Cardigan Quay in 2018 to honour multiple powerboat champion, boat-builder and commentator Jonathan Jones in his home town.

=== River ===
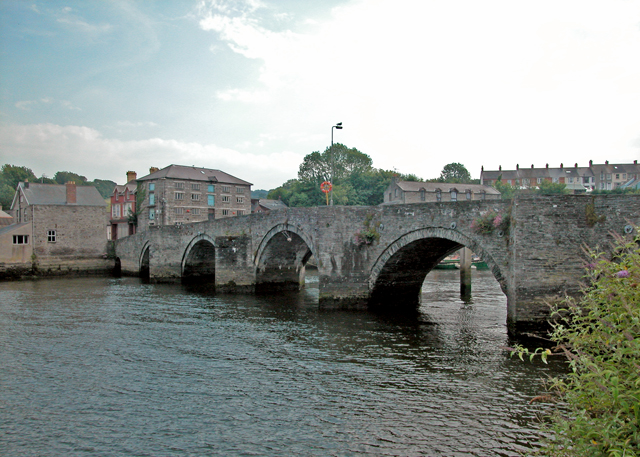
The old Cardigan Bridge

Moorings in the River Teifi are under the control of Afon Teifi Fairways and there is some deepwater mooring on the south bank downstream of the old bridge. Other midstream moorings exist from Cardigan downstream to the estuary and there are occasional slipways on both sides of the river. There is an activity centre by the old bridge for kayaking in the river when tide and river conditions permit.

Cardigan Lifeboat Station is situated at Poppit Sands on the Teifi estuary, having been operational since 1849 apart from the period 1872–1931. Its boathouse and shop are open to the public during the summer months.

=== Annual events ===
Barley Saturday, an agricultural event, has been held in the town on the Saturday following the last Friday in April since the 19th century. Historically the farmers from the surrounding area would come to the town to hire workers and to inspect stallions that are put out to stud. In modern times the horses have become the centre of attention. After judging, the horses are paraded through the town followed by vintage tractors, cars and motorbikes.

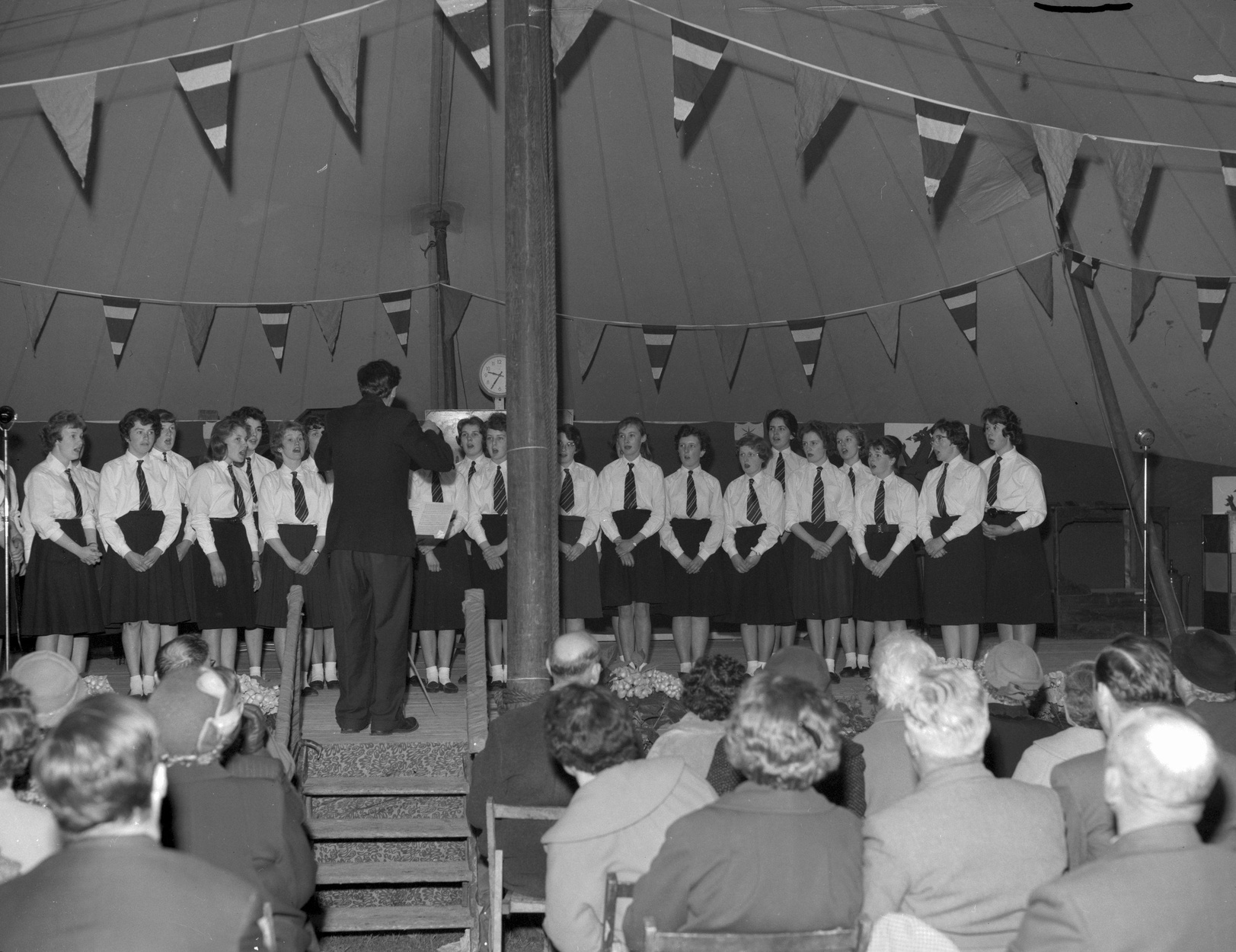
Performers at the 1961 Gwyl Fawr Aberteifi

Since 1953 the town has held its own annual Eisteddfod, originally called Eisteddfod Gadeiriol Is-Genedlaethol Aberteifi ('Cardigan Sub-national Chaired Eisteddfod') but later known as the Gwyl Fawr Aberteifi (lit. 'Cardigan Big Festival'). The festival had a four-year break due to the COVID-19 pandemic in the early 2020s.

In August there is a wine and food festival.

Each August (since 2014), British record label Fruits de Mer Records organizes a three-day psychedelic music festival, The Dream of Dr. Sardonicus: A Festival of Psychedelia, which is held at The Cellar Bar in Cardigan.

== Transport ==
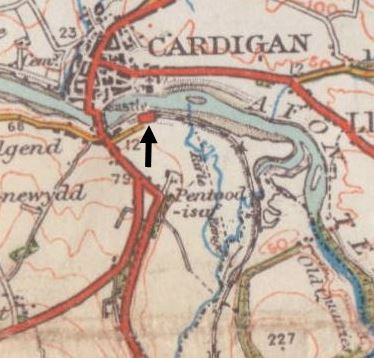
Cardigan railway station (arrowed) south of the Teifi (c. mid-1930s)

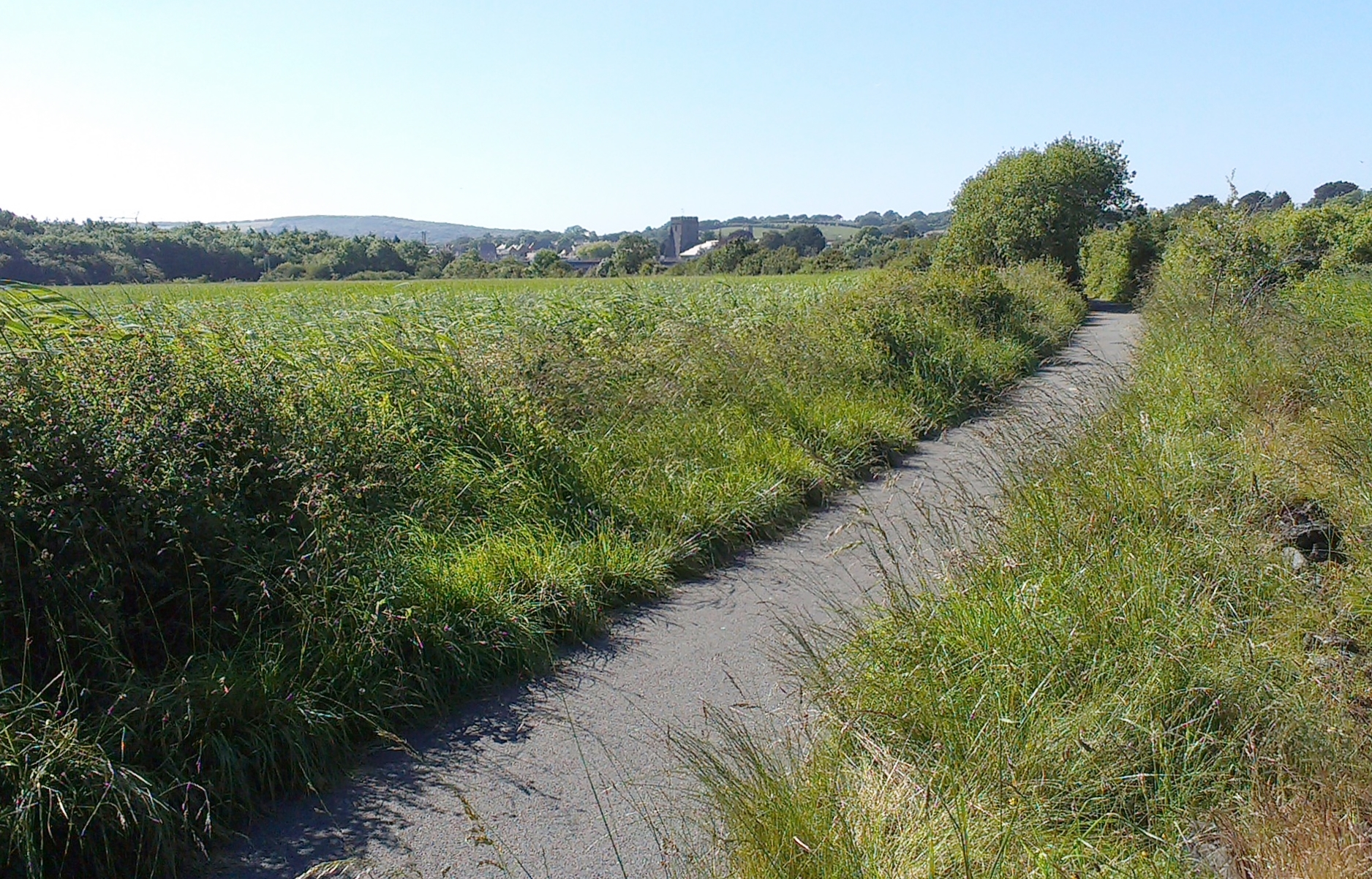
The trackbed of the former railway near Cardigan is now a footpath. The church can be seen in the distance.

The A487 coastal trunk road provides links to the northeast and southwest; the A478 south to Narberth and Tenby and the A484 southeast to Swansea. A bypass was constructed to the southeast of the town in 1989–90, including a new concrete bridge (Priory Bridge) over the River Teifi. Bus services link Cardigan with most nearby towns and villages in Ceredigion, Pembrokeshire and Carmarthenshire.

Cardigan railway station was the terminus of the Whitland and Cardigan Railway. On 2 August 1877, the Whitland and Taf Vale Railway Company obtained an act of Parliament giving authorisation to extend the line to Cardigan. Completion to Cardigan was slow; the opening was finally achieved on 1 September 1886 and on the same day the Great Western Railway took over the working of the line.

The railway station closed to passengers prior to the Beeching Axe on 10 September 1962 but remained open to goods traffic until 27 May 1963. After that, the station remained open as a coal depot until April 1965, staffed by British Railways staff until November 1964. Final closure came on 6 September 1965. The old goods shed marks the site of the former station. A local Welsh language newspaper uses the nickname of the line, Cardi bach, as does the shuttle bus service between Cardigan and New Quay.

The section of old trackbed between Cardigan and Cilgerran is now a footpath and cycle track to the Teifi estuary woodlands and marshes and the Welsh Wildlife Centre.

== Notable people ==
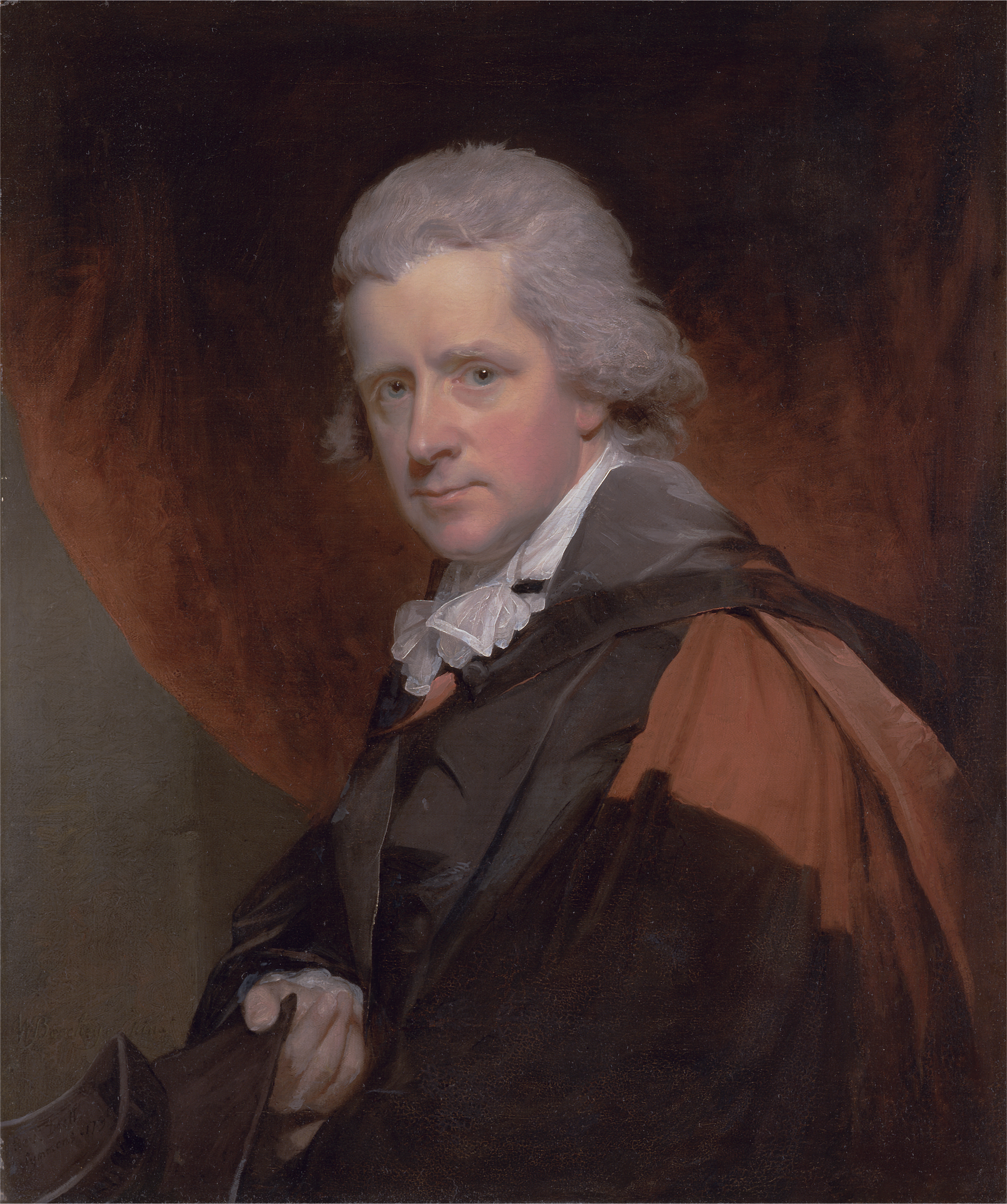
Reverend Dr Charles Symmons, 1794

- Elisha Lawrence (1740–1811), American politician and colonel, died in Cardigan
- Charles Symmons (1749–1826), a Welsh poet and priest.
- Kenny Meadows (1790–1874), caricaturist and illustrator, contributed drawings to Punch
- Robert Lewis-Lloyd (1836–1915), rower, barrister, High Sheriff of Radnorshire and umpire of the Boat Race, 1881/88.
- Towyn Jones (1858–1925), clergyman and politician; MP for Carmarthenshire East and later for Llanelli
- Moelwyn Hughes (1897–1955), lawyer, Liberal and Labour politician and MP
- Evelyn Bowen (1911–1994), a Welsh and Canadian actress, director, writer, editor and educator.
- Nicola Heywood-Thomas (1955–2023), a Welsh broadcaster and journalist best known for presenting HTV Wales News.
- Buddug Verona James (born ca.1955), "Opera Singer, Actress and Butcher"
- David Edwards (1964–2021), musician, singer and writer; lead singer with Datblygu
- Gareth Milton (born ca.1980), actor, born in Aberystwyth and brought up in Cardigan.

=== Sport ===
- Brynmor Williams (born 1951), international rugby union, and professional rugby league footballer.
- Hywel Davies (born 1957), jockey, rode for 16 years with 761 wins, retired 1994.
- John Davies (born 1971), former Welsh rugby union prop with 34 caps for Wales
- Wayne Proctor (born 1972), former rugby union footballer with 274 caps for Llanelli RFC and 39 for Wales
- Owen Evans (born 1989), a Welsh rugby union player
- Jodie Grinham (born 1993), archer, competed at the 2016 Summer Paralympics and won gold at the 2024 Summer Paralympics

== See also ==
- Cardigan Island, which lies just 200 m (220 yd) offshore from Gwbert.
- Cardigan (sweater)
- Earl of Cardigan
- Gwbert, a nearby coastal settlement
- Moylegrove, a nearby village
- Mwnt, a popular nearby coastal location
