= New Quay F.C. =

Football club based in Ceredigion

New Quay
- Full name: New Quay Football Club
- Nicknames: Mackerel Men, The Seasiders
- Founded: 1960s
- Ground: Parc Arthur
- League: Ceredigion League Second Division
- 2025–26: Ceredigion League Second Division, 3rd of 9
- Website: New Quay club website
Home colours	Away colours

New Quay Football Club is a Welsh football club based in New Quay, Ceredigion. The team currently plays in the Ceredigion League Second Division.

== History ==
The first mention of a football club in New Quay was in reference to a match against Llanarth on 29 December 1894.

The club first entered the Ceredigion League in 1931–32, finishing fifth out of six teams.

The club was reformed in the early 1960s.

New Quay played in the 1978–79 Welsh Cup, where they lost in the preliminary round against Montgomery Town.

The club's greatest period came in the early 2010s, with three consecutive Ceredigion League titles in 2010–11, 2011–12, and 2012–13. In 2010–11 they also won the J. Emrys Morgan Cup, beating Llanrhaeadr reserves in the final. However just three years after their last title the club was on the brink of folding.

In the 2019–20 season they won the Division Two title and were promoted to Division One.

In May 2023 the team won 7–1 against Llanboidy reserves to win the South Cards Cup. They finished runners-up to Lampeter Town in Division Two, losing just one league match, and gained promotion.

== Honours ==
- Ceredigion League Division One - Winners: 2010–11, 2011–12, 2012–13
- Ceredigion League Cup - Winners: 2007–08
- Bay Cup - Winners: 2007–08, 2011–12, 2012–13
- Ceredigion League Division Two - Champions: 1997–98, 2002–03, 2019–20
- Ceredigion League Division Three/Reserves Cup - Champions: 1990–91
- J. Emrys Morgan Cup - Winners: 2010–11
- Ceredigion Cup - Winners: 1982–83, 2002–03
- Percy Eldridge Cup - Winners: 1984–85, 1990–91
- South Cards Cup - Winners: 2022–23
- North Cards Cup - Winners: 1994–95
- Cwpan Ceredigion - Winners: 2008–09, 2011–12
