= Cardigan Guildhall =

Municipal Building in Cardigan, Wales

- Neuadd y Dref Aberteifi (Welsh)
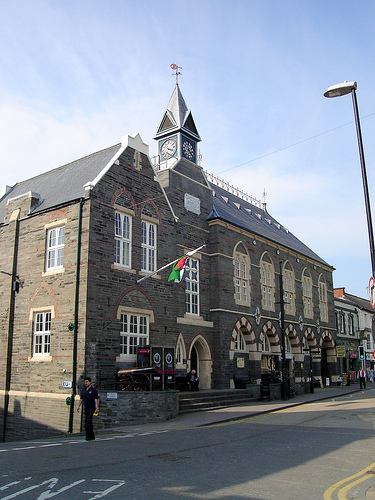
- Cardigan Guildhall

- Shown in Ceredigion
- 52.0837°N 4.6610°W
- Location: Pendre, Cardigan

History
- Built: 1860

Site notes
- Architect: Robert Jewell Withers
- Architectural style: Gothic Revival style

Listed Building – Grade II*
- Official name: The Guildhall and markets
- Designated: 16 June 1961
- Reference no.: 10479

Cardigan Guildhall (Welsh: Neuadd y Dref Aberteifi), is a municipal building in Pendre, Cardigan, Ceredigion, Wales. The structure, which is now used as an art gallery and community events venue, is a Grade II* listed building.

== History ==
The first municipal building in the town was a market hall which was commissioned by a local publican, William Phillips, and erected in Market Lane in 1823. By the mid-19th century, the old market hall had become inadequate and civic leaders decided to commission a larger structure: the site they selected in Pendre was occupied by the local grammar school and by a house and a coach-house owned by a local businessman, Abraham Morgan. The foundation stone for the new building was laid by the mayor, Richard David Jenkins, on 8 July 1858. It was designed by Robert Jewell Withers in the Gothic Revival style, built by local builders, David Jenkins, John Davies and John Thomas of Cilgerran in Blue Lias stone at a cost of £4,055 and was officially opened on 9 July 1860.

The design involved an asymmetrical main frontage with seven bays facing onto Pendre; the main hall section, formed by the five bays on the right which were slightly projected forward, featured arched openings on the ground floor and mullioned and transomed windows with hood moulds on the first floor. The first bay on the left, which was gabled and also slightly projected forward, was fenestrated by a single window on the ground floor and by a pair of cross windows on the first floor, while the second bay of the left featured an arched doorway on the ground floor and a single window on the first floor. At roof level, the main section was covered by a mansard roof. Internally, the principal rooms were the corn exchange on the ground floor and the great hall on the first floor. The guildhall was one of the first buildings in the UK to adopt the principles of Gothic Architecture contained in the book by the art critic, John Ruskin, who claimed that "nothing can possibly be better or more graceful" than a well-constructed Venetian Gothic arch.

A Russian cannon, which had been captured during the charge of the Light Brigade, led by Lord Cardigan against Russian forces during the Battle of Balaclava in October 1854 in the Crimean War, was installed outside the building in 1871. In the early 1890s, a clock tower with a pyramid-shaped roof was installed above the second bay on the left at the expense of the then mayor, David Davies. The tower was designed by a local architect, Richard Thomas, built by a local builder, John Evans, and completed in August 1892.

A public library was officially opened in the former corn exchange on the ground floor of the building on 6 February 1950. The building continued to serve as the meeting place of the Cardigan Borough Council for much of the rest of the 20th century but ceased to be the local seat of government when the enlarged Ceredigion District Council was formed in 1974. After the public library relocated to the Canolfan Teifi in 1994, an art gallery was established on the ground floor of the building. A substantial programme of refurbishment works was carried out with financial support from the Heritage Lottery Fund by a not-for profit local regeneration company, Menter Aberteifi, at a cost of £2.5 million and completed in 2008.

== See also ==
- Grade II* listed buildings in Ceredigion
