= St Mary's, Bourne Street =

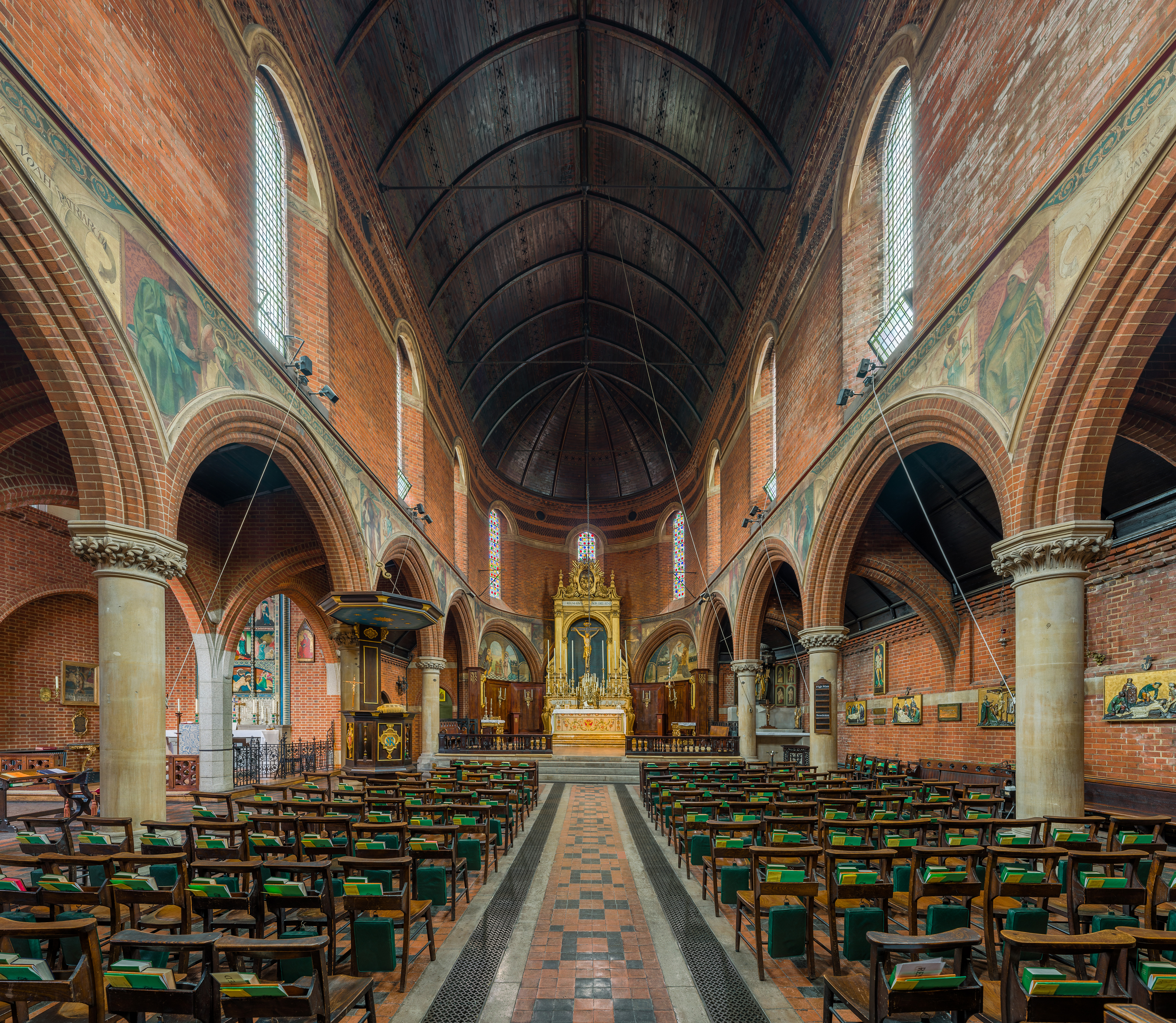
- The interior of St Mary's, looking north-east toward the altar
- St Mary's, Bourne Street
- 51°29′30.52″N 0°9′16.05″W
- Location: 30 Bourne Street, London, SW1W 8JJ
- Country: England
- Denomination: Church of England
- Churchmanship: Anglo-Catholic
- Website: stmarysbournest.com

Architecture
- Architect: RJ Withers
- Style: Early English Period
- Years built: 1874

Administration
- Diocese: London
- Parish: St Mary the Virgin Pimlico

Clergy
- Vicar: Vacant
- Priest: Fr Justin Gau

St Mary's, Bourne Street, is an Anglican church on Bourne Street near Sloane Square in London. It was built 'quickly and cheaply' in 1874 by Robert Jewell Withers, with the intention of providing ministry to the poor living in the nearby slums of Pimlico.

== History and architecture ==
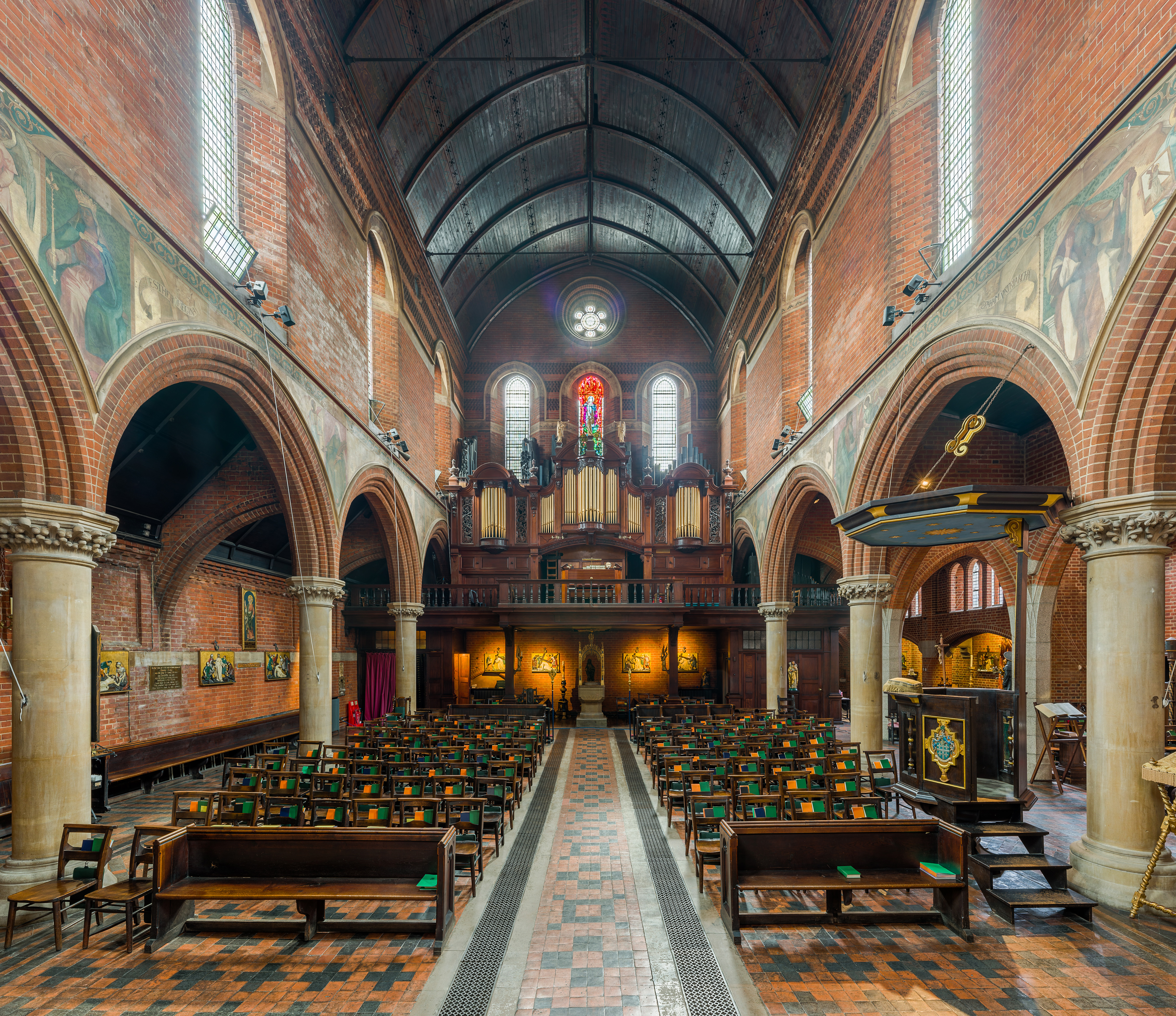
The interior facing south-west toward the organ

In London during the 19th century, there was rapid development of Belgravia and Pimlico which was accompanied by the building of many new churches in the area. In addition, the construction of the London Underground resulted in many houses being demolished by the 'cut and cover' works. In 1874, St Mary's was built directly over the path of the District line in the Early English style using cheap machine-made red brick. The church was designed by RJ Withers, a little known architect practising predominantly in the West Country. Withers had previously undertaken alterations to churches in London, and was working at St Paul's Church, Knightsbridge, when the decision to build St Mary's was taken. With his reputation, according to his obituarist, of building "a good cheap type of brick church", he was the obvious choice to design St Mary's, which was originally intended to act as a servant's church. Other architectural features resulting from the economic construction include low windowless aisles and plain slate roof with a bell cote housing a solitary bell. Buttressing was added by Harry Stuart Goodhart-Rendel following bomb damage in World War II.

In its report of the dedication on 4 July 1874, the Church Times described the interior of St Mary's:

"A spacious nave is terminated in an apsidal chancel and there are two aisles. The nave is very lofty and the interior of the roof is elaborately decorated with colour. Bold figures of Our Lady and St John on either side of a crucifix appear on the reredos, in front of which stands one of the most effective altars we have seen of late. It is formed of sweet cedar, and is richly ornamental with gold and colour. The chapel as a whole is remarkably effective, and has a solid and substantial look which is highly satisfactory. It is, in a word, an excellent specimen of an inexpensive church, the cost of the whole, not counting special gifts such as the reredos, altar, font etc., being about £4,500.".

The paintings in the arcade spandrels are by Nathaniel Westlake (1895–1896): Eve, Ruth, Esther, David and Daniel on the south wall and Adam, Noah, Abraham, Moses and Ezekiel on the north. Also the Annunciation and Mary meeting Elizabeth in the chancel. In the chapel of the Seven Sorrows, next to the altar, a new rose window by Margaret Aldrich Rope replaced that damaged in the war. The west window of St George and St Edward the Confessor, hidden behind the organ, was added in 1897, designed by Mary Lowndes.

== Present day ==
The liturgy and worship at St Mary's combines Gregorian chant, Renaissance, Viennese and contemporary sacred music with the language of the Book of Common Prayer. The ceremonial is traditional. The musical staff is led by the director of music, Richard Pinel, supported by the organist, Richard Hills. Previous directors of music include Paul Brough, David Trendell and William Whitehead.

The parish stands within the Catholic tradition of the Church of England. It has passed resolutions A and B, thereby rejecting the ordination of women. The church is not a member of the traditionalist Catholic organisation, Forward in Faith, nor of the Liberal Catholic group, Affirming Catholicism.
