= South Wales and Monmouthshire Football Association =

The South Wales and Monmouthshire Football Association was the governing body of association football in South Wales and Monmouthshire and was responsible for the development of the game in the region.

== Formation ==
The association was established in 1893 and organised various leagues and cups in the area, including the South Wales Senior Cup. Also, the Association ran two senior leagues in their early days, the South Wales League (which had already been in existence since 1890) and the Rhymney Valley League (formed in 1903).

== Restructuring ==
After the 1967–1968 season the Football Association of Wales decided to restructure the existing football associations and proposed to set up new Area Football Associations. As a result of this restructuring, the Association was split into three separate associations by the beginning of the 1968—1969 season: The South Wales Football Association, the Monmouthshire County Football Association and the West Wales Football Association. The three regionalised associations had previously run under the South Wales and Monmouthshire FA, as early as 1924.
