= C.P.D. Felinfach =

Football club based in Ceredigion

Felinfach
- Full name: Clwb Pel Droed Felinfach Football Club
- Nicknames: The Milkmen, Y Felin
- Founded: 1980
- Ground: Felinfach Playing Fields
- Chairman: Edryd Evans
- League: Central Wales Southern Division
- 2025–26: Ceredigion League First Division, 2nd of 11 (promoted)
Home colours	Away colours

C.P.D. Felinfach is a Welsh football club based in Felinfach, Ceredigion. The team plays in the Central Wales Southern Division.

The club competed in the 2024–25 Welsh Cup, losing in the first qualifying round to Chirk AAA. They also entered the 2026–27 Welsh Cup and lost 6–0 to Cardiff Airport in the first qualifying round.

== History ==
C.P.D. Felinfach was founded in 1980 and joined the Ceredigion League. Their first trophy came in their first season, winning the Ceredigion Cup. In 1995 they won a double of the Second Division and the Ceredigion Cup.

In the 1997–98 season they beat Dewi Stars to win the South Cards Cup.

In the 2023–24 season they won the Dai Davies Memorial Cup. The following season they won the Ceredigion League Cup.

In the summer of 2025 it was announced that the club would benefit from £270,000 worth of improvements to their pitch from the local council, aimed at levelling the pitch and improving the current poor drainage.

In August 2025 the club's chairman Eilir Evans resigned. He was replaced by local businessman Edryd Evans. In the 2025–26 season the team won the Dai Davies Cup again and finished second in the league, one point behind champions Llechryd. The club confirmed promotion to the Central Wales League South (tier four) after this success.

== Honours ==
- Ceredigion League First Division - Runners–up: 2025–26
- Ceredigion League Second Division - Champions: 1994–95
- Ceredigion League Cup - Winners: 2024–25
- South Cards Cup - Winners: 1997–98
- Ceredigion Cup - Winners: 1980–81, 1994–95
- Dai Davies Memorial Cup - Winners: 2023–24, 2025–26
