= Llandysul F.C. =

Football club based in Ceredigion

Llandysul
- Full name: Llandysul Football Club
- Nickname: The Swallows
- Founded: 1886
- Ground: Llandysul Park
- League: Ceredigion League First Division
- 2024–25: Ceredigion League First Division, 11th of 12
Home colours	Away colours

Llandysul F.C. is a Welsh football club based in Llandysul, Ceredigion. The team plays in the Ceredigion League First Division.

== History ==
Llandysul Football Club was founded in 1886, however football had been played in Llandysul as early as 1877. They were founder members of the Cardiganshire League in 1921–22, and beat Parish Hall United in the final to become the league's inaugural champions.

They won the Ceredigion League again in 1948–49. In 1958–59 and 1959–60 they won the Bay Cup twice in a row. They won their third Bay Cup in 1964–65. The team won its first Ceredigion League Cup in 1979–80. In the 1980s their reserves went on to win the Percy Eldridge Cup three times and Division Three once. They won the Percy Eldridge Cup again in 1993–94, and the first team gained a fourth Bay Cup title in 1995–96.

At the start of the 2001–02 season there were rumours of the club potentially merging with Pencader. However this did not happen, and Pencader went on to beat the Swallows in the final of the Ceredigion Cup. In the 2008–09 season Llandysul were Division Two champions, finishing three points ahead of Dewi Stars. This success gained them promotion back to Division One.

In 2016 Llandysul lifted the Bay Cup. The following season was one of the most successful in the club's history. The first team won the Ceredigion League and J. Emrys Morgan Cup, while the reserves won Division Three and the Percy Eldridge Cup. In August 2017 they also went on to lift the Eddie Merry Memorial Trophy. In 2019 Llandysul won the Bay Cup and League Cup.

In 2020 former Swansea City player and Wales international John Cornforth agreed to help out the management team in a league match in February.

At the end of the 2024–25 season they were relegated to Division Two.

== Honours ==
- Ceredigion League Division One - Champions: 1921–22, 1948–49, 2016–17
- Ceredigion League Division Two - Champions: 2008–09
- Ceredigion League Division Three - Champions: 1988–89, 2016–17, 2019–20
- J. Emrys Morgan Cup - Winners: 2016–17
- Ceredigion League Cup - Winners: 1979–80, 2018–19
- Percy Eldridge Cup - Winners: 1982–83, 1985–86, 1988–89, 1993–94, 2016–17
- Bay Cup - Winners: 1958–59, 1959–60, 1964–65, 1995–96, 2015–16, 2018–19
- Eddie Merry Memorial Trophy - Winners: 2017
