= Newcastle Emlyn F.C. =

Association football club in Wales

Newcastle Emlyn AFC
- Full name: Newcastle Emlyn AFC
- Nickname: The Reds
- Founded: August 1969
- Ground: Parc Emlyn
- Capacity: 1000
- League: Ceredigion League Premier Division
- 2025–26: Ceredigion League First Division, 4th of 11
Home colours	Away colours

Newcastle Emlyn A.F.C. are a football club based in Newcastle Emlyn, who play in the Ceredigion League Premier Division. They have previously played in the Welsh Football League.

== History ==
Newcastle Emlyn were one of the founder members of the Cardiganshire League in 1921, but withdrew without playing a game. The original club won the league title in 1947–48 and 1956–57.

The club was reformed in August 1969 after a 10 year gap. They went on to win league titles in 1975–76, 1977–78, 1983–84, 1985–86, 1987–88, 1989–90 and 1998–99, as well as the J. Emrys Morgan Cup in 1976–77 and 1991–92, and many other cup honours. After finishing as runners-up in the 1999–2000 season, they joined the Welsh Football League Division Three. In 2008 they were promoted to Division Two, but were relegated in 2012 and returned to the Ceredigion League in 2014. In 2018 the team won 5–0 in the final of the J. Emrys Morgan Cup against Four Crosses. That season they also won the League Cup, the reserves won the Percy Eldridge Cup, and the youth team won the Youth Cup.

For the 2021–22 season they were placed into the new West Division of the Central Wales Football League. They finished second in the division, but withdrew ahead of the following season due to a lack of players.

The club reformed in 2023 and rejoined the Ceredigion League. In their first season they were crowned champions of Division Two, but in the following season they struggled after promotion to Division One, finishing tenth. The club reached the 2026 league cup final for the first time in 8 years, however Emlyn ended up runners up by losing 3–1 to Llechryd. The club finished an impressive 4th place in the league.

== Crest and colours ==
The dragon on the club's badge represents Gwiber Emlyn, which was once a banner of Owain Glyndŵr. The legend of Gwiber Castell Newydd Emlyn says that a wyvern appeared on the castle walls and initially brought the locals to terror. A soldier then shot the creature and it floated down the River Teifi to its resting place, Pwll Du William, which is located at the bottom of the football pitch.

The club colours are red and white.

== Ground ==
The club plays its home matches at Parc Emlyn. The ground has floodlights.

== Honours ==
- Ceredigion League Division One – Champions: 1947–48, 1956–57, 1975–76, 1977–78, 1983–84, 1985–86, 1987–88, 1989–90, 1998–99, 2013–14
- Ceredigion League Division Two – Champions: 2011–12, 2023–24
- Ceredigion League Division Three – Champions: 1997–98, 1999–2000, 2000–01, 2013–14
- Pembrokeshire League Division Three – Champions: 1977–78
- Ceredigion League Cup – Winners: 1946–47, 1947–48, 1955–56, 1958–59, 1969–70, 1971–72, 1973–74, 1976–77, 1977–78, 1978–79, 1982–83, 1983–84, 1984–85, 1998–99, 2016–17, 2017–18
- South Cards Cup – Winners: 1977–78, 1980–81, 1984–85, 1986–87, 1998–99, 2011–12, 2023–24
- Ceredigion Cup – Winners: 1984–85
- J. Emrys Morgan Cup – Winners: 1976–77, 1991–92, 2017–18
- Percy Eldridge Cup – Winners: 1983–84, 1987–88, 1991–92, 1997–98, 1998–99, 1999–2000, 2015–16, 2017–18
- North Cards Cup – Winners: 1985–86, 1993–94, 1998–99
- Bay Cup – Winners: 1956–57, 1969–70, 1971–72, 1972–73, 1979–80, 1980–81, 1985–86, 1989–90, 1994–95, 1998–99, 1999–2000, 2016–17

== Current squad ==
Note: Flags indicate national team as defined under FIFA eligibility rules; some limited exceptions apply. Players may hold more than one non-FIFA nationality.

No.	Pos.	Nation	Player
1	GK	WAL	Kieran Brook
13	GK	WAL	Jonathan Durbridge
31	GK	WAL	Nathan Jones
2	DF	WAL	Dafydd Owen
3	DF	WAL	Reece Prowse
4	DF	WAL	Callum Cresser
5	DF	WAL	Leon Morgan
6	MF	WAL	Osian Thomas
7	MF	WAL	Josh Bennett
8	MF	WAL	Jethro Smith
9	FW	ENG	Ashley Campbell
10	FW	WAL	Sam Brook
11	MF	ENG	Riley Clemas

No.	Pos.	Nation	Player
14	FW	ENG	Gareth Winston
15	DF	WAL	Mike Glover
16	FW	WAL	Reagan Williams
17	FW	WAL	Tim Griffiths
18	DF	WAL	Dorian Davies
19	FW	WAL	Will Williams
20	MF	WAL	Jonathan Seeley
21	MF	WAL	Carwyn Thomas
22	FW	WAL	John Midgeley
23	MF	WAL	Luca MacMuiris
