= Cardigan Town F.C. =

Football club based in Ceredigion

Cardigan Town
- Full name: Cardigan Town Football Club
- Nickname: The Magpies
- Founded: 1870
- Ground: King George V Playing Fields
- League: Ceredigion League First Division
- 2024–25: Ceredigion League First Division, 6th of 12
Home colours	Away colours

Cardigan Town Football Club is a Welsh football club based in Cardigan, Ceredigion. The team plays in the Ceredigion League First Division.

== History ==
Cardigan Town Football Club is claimed to have been formed in 1870. No contemporary evidence exists for this date, which would make them one of the oldest clubs in Wales.

The club's most successful season was in 2014–15, where they won all five competitions available at their level: The Ceredigion League, J. Emrys Morgan Cup, Cwpan Coffa Dai Dynamo Davies, Easter Monday League Cup, and the Bay Cup, as well as the reserves winning the Reserves Cup and the under-18s winning the Youth Cup. The following season they also won the league title.

In 2025 they were rejected planning permission for a storage container at their ground.

== Honours ==
- Ceredigion League Division One - Champions: 1968–69, 1995–96, 1999–2000, 2002–03, 2009–10, 2014–15, 2015–16
- Ceredigion League Division Two - Champions: 1991–92, 2012–13
- Ceredigion League Reserve Cup - Winners: 1994–95, 2003–04, 2014–15
- Ceredigion League Cup - Winners: 1949–50, 1963–64, 1966–67, 1968–69, 2001–02, 2004–05, 2014–15
- South Cards Cup - Winners: 1995–96
- J. Emrys Morgan Cup - Winners: 1998–99, 2014–15
- Percy Eldridge Cup - Winners: 1995–96, 2008–09
- Bay Cup - Winners: 1966–67, 1968–69, 1997–98, 2002–03, 2004–05, 2006–07, 2009–10, 2014–15, 2023–24
- Cwpan Ceredigion - Winners: 2014–15
- Youth Cup - Winners: 2014–15
