= St Dogmaels F.C. =

Football club based in Pembrokeshire

St Dogmaels
- Full name: St Dogmaels Football Club
- Nickname: Saints
- Ground: School Field
- League: Ceredigion League First Division
- 2025–26: Ceredigion League First Division, 5th of 11
Home colours	Away colours

St Dogmaels F.C. is a Welsh football club based in St Dogmaels, Pembrokeshire. The team plays in the Ceredigion League First Division. The club also has successful teams at junior level.

The club has had success in the local Ceredigion League, including four consecutive league titles between 1991 and 1995 - a period which came to be known as the "Golden Nineties". As of 2020, their four consecutive titles still stood as a league record.

== History ==
The club was successful in the 1960s, winning league titles in 1960–61, 1964–65 and 1965–66. They also won the league title in 1973–74. After Maesglas folded in the early 1990s, many of their key players joined St Dogmaels. In the "Golden Nineties", St Dogmaels won the league four times in a row (from 1991 to 1995), and lifted the 1994–95 J. Emrys Morgan Cup with a win over Llanrhaeadr in the final. As of 2020, their four consecutive league titles was still a league record. They won league titles again in 1996–97 and 2006–07.

In 2019 St Dogmaels were again crowned champions of the Ceredigion League. They repeated this in the following season, and again in 2021–22, the first season after the COVID-19 pandemic.

In 2024 the club formed a women's team for the first time.

== Colours ==
St Dogmaels play in green.

== Ground ==
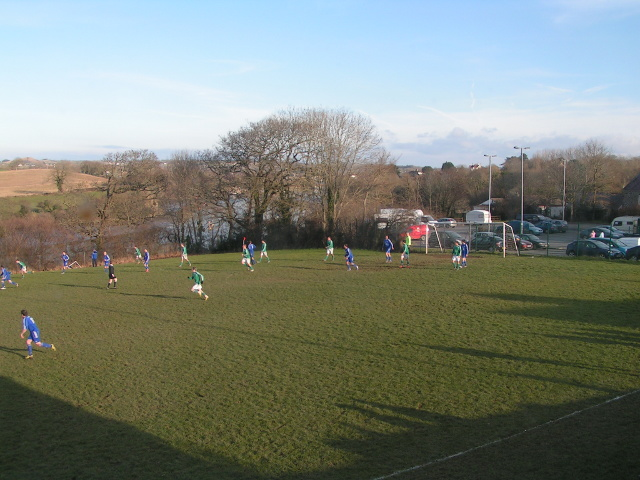
School Field

St Dogmaels play their home games at School Field. The pitch is located in the centre of the village.

The club's junior teams have also used an astroturf pitch at Cardigan Leisure Centre.

== Honours ==
=== League ===
- Ceredigion League Division One
  - Champions (13): 1960–61, 1964–65, 1965–66, 1973–74, 1991–92, 1992–93, 1993–94, 1994–95, 1996–97, 2006–07, 2018–19, 2019–20, 2021–22

=== Cups ===
- Ceredigion League Reserves Cup
  - Winners: 1985–86
- Ceredigion League Cup
  - Winners: 1964–65, 1990–91, 2008–09, 2009–10, 2011–12
- Cwpan Ceredigion
  - Winners: 2006–07, 2010–11, 2012–13
- J. Emrys Morgan Cup
  - Winners: 1994–95
- Percy Eldridge Cup
  - Winners: 1992–93, 1994–95, 2007–08, 2012–13, 2013–14, 2014–15, 2018–19
- South Cards Cup
  - Winners: 1992–93
- Bay Cup
  - Winners: 1967–68, 1983–84, 1990–91, 1992–93, 2013–14, 2017–18
