= Crymych F.C. =

Football club based in Pembrokeshire

Crymych
- Full name: Crymych Football Club
- Founded: 2019
- Ground: Tegryn football pitch
- Manager: Steve John
- League: Ceredigion League First Division
- 2024–25: Ceredigion League First Division, 9th of 12
- Website: cpdcrymych.cymru
Home colours	Away colours

Crymych Football Club is a Welsh football club based in Crymych, Pembrokeshire. They currently play in the Ceredigion League First Division.

== History ==
The club was formed in 2019. They were initially forced into the West Wales Football Association setup due to being located in Pembrokeshire, but an appeal allowed them into the Ceredigion League.

In 2023 they took over the previously closed Crymych Arms pub, which they now use as their clubhouse.

In 2025 the club formed a women's team. The same year, the club raised £90,000 for a new football pitch in the village.

== Honours ==
- Ceredigion League Cup - Runners-up: 2022–23
- Dai Davies Memorial Cup - Runners-up: 2023–24
