= Charles Symmons =

Welsh poet and priest (1749–1826)

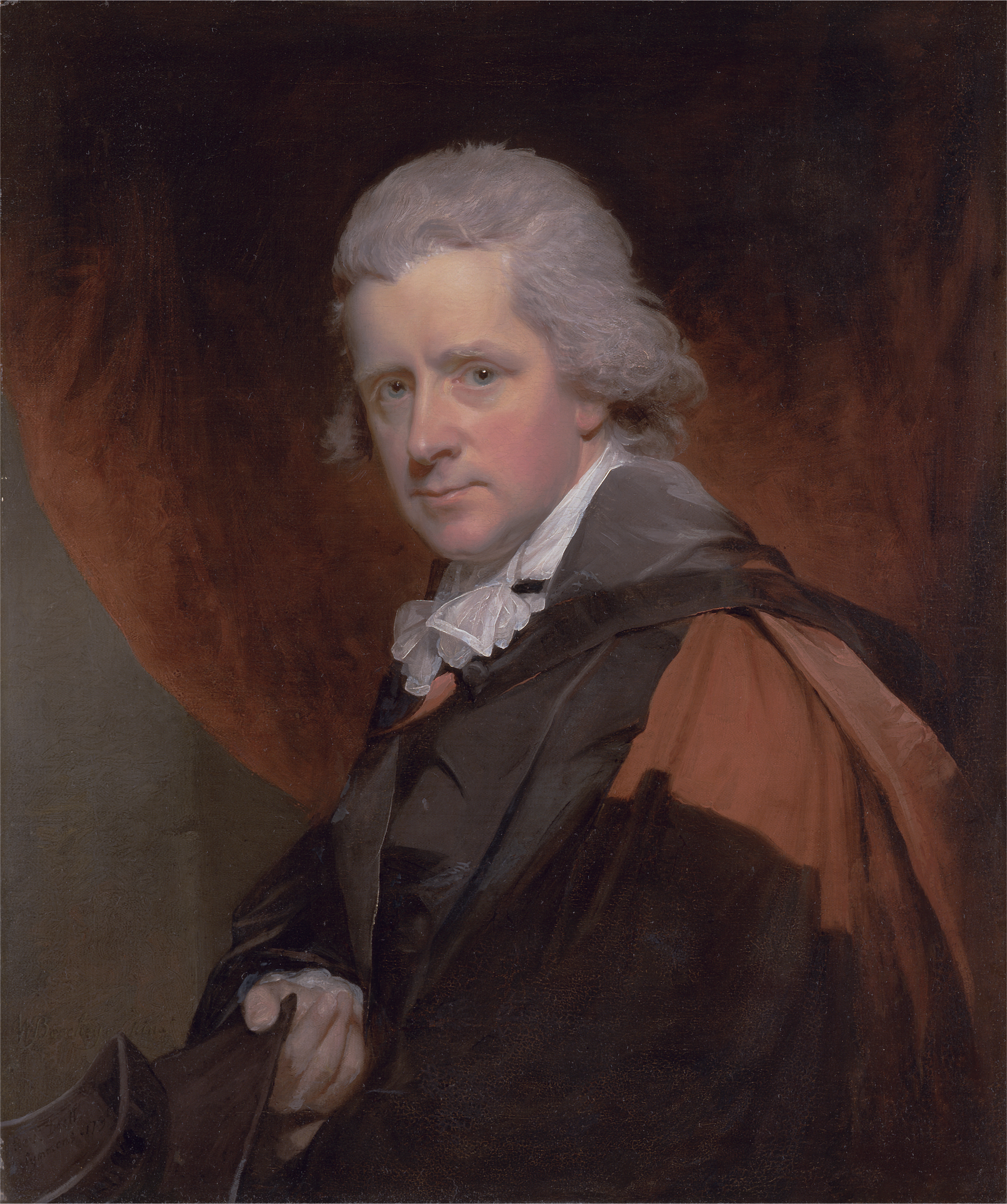
Reverend Dr. Charles Symmons (William Beechey, 1794)

Charles Symmons (1749 – 27 April 1826) was a Welsh poet and priest.

== Life ==
Symmons was the younger son of John Symmons, the MP for Cardigan. He was born in Cardigan in 1749 and educated at Westminster School, joining the school in 1765; he was admitted as a member of Lincoln's Inn later in the same year. He then attended the University of Glasgow in 1766, striking up a friendship with William Windham. Symmons was ordained deacon in 1773 and priest in 1774, and was appointed rector of Narberth in Pembrokeshire in 1778. He also studied at Clare College, Cambridge from 1776 to 1786, obtaining a Bachelor of Divinity degree. He was made a prebendary of St David's Cathedral in 1789.

In 1793, Symmons prepared to take his Doctor of Divinity degree at Cambridge, which required him to preach two sermons at the Church of St Mary the Great, Cambridge. His moderate whig views were controversial in the wake of the trial of William Frend. One of his opponents, Thomas Kipling, sent extracts to influential clerics. Symmons protested, but decided to take his degree from the University of Oxford instead. He was incorporated as a member of Jesus College, Oxford on 29 March 1794 and received his DD two days later. His whiggish views inhibited further advancement in the church, although he was additionally appointed rector of Lampeter Velfrey, an adjoining parish to Narberth, in 1794. He failed to be appointed a prebendary of Westminster Abbey as he wished. He died at Bath on 27 April 1826, survived by his wife, two sons and three daughters.

== Works ==
His earliest works included a volume of sermons (1787), a tragedy Inez (1796) and Constantia, a dramatic poem (1800). Family bereavements reduced his writings thereafter. His major works were a Life of Milton, prefixed to an edition of Milton's work (1806), a rhyming translation of the Aeneid (1817) and a Life of Shakespeare, prefixed to an 1826 edition of Shakespeare's works.
