= Ffostrasol Wanderers A.F.C. =

Football club based in Ceredigion

Ffostrasol Wanderers
- Full name: Ffostrasol Wanderers Association Football Club
- Nickname: Ffos
- Founded: 1963
- Ground: Troedyrhiw Park
- League: Central Wales Southern Division
- 2025–26: Central Wales Southern Division, 1st of 13
| Home colours | Away colours |

Ffostrasol Wanderers A.F.C. is a Welsh football club based in Ffostrasol, Ceredigion. The team plays in the Central Wales Southern Division. The club also has a reserve team in the Ceredigion League.

The club has competed in the Welsh Cup on three occasions, in 2023–24, 2024–25 and 2025–26. They went out in the qualifying rounds all three times.

In the 2025–26 season they were champions of the Central Wales Football League Southern Division.

== Honours ==
- Central Wales League Southern Division
  - Winners: 2025–26
  - Runners–up: 2024–25
- Ceredigion League First Division - Champions: 1967–68, 1969–70, 1970–71, 1971–72, 1974–75, 1976–77, 1979–80, 2022–23, 2023–24
- Ceredigion League Second Division - Champions: 2016–17
- Ceredigion League Third Division - Champions: 2017–18 (reserves)
- Ceredigion League Cup - Winners: 1972–73, 1974–75, 1975–76, 1980–81, 2021–22, 2022–23, 2023–24
- South Cards Cup - Winners: 1978–79, 2015–16
- Ceredigion Cup - Winners: 2003–04
- J. Emrys Morgan Cup - Winners: 1974–75
- Percy Eldridge Cup - Winners: 1996–97, 2021–22, 2022–23, 2023–24
- Bay Cup - Winners: 1970–71, 1974–75, 1977–78, 1991–92, 1993–94, 2021–22, 2022–23
- Mond Cup - Winners: 1973–74, 1974–75
- Easter Monday League - Winners: 1974–75
- Ffostrasol Summer Cup - Winners: 1977–78
- Cwpan Coffa Dai Davies - Winners: 2022–23
- Central Wales League Challenge Cup – Finalists: 2024–25
