= Bargod Rangers A.F.C. =

Football club based in Carmarthenshire

Bargod Rangers
- Ground: Parc Puw, Drefach Felindre
- League: Ceredigion League Second Division
- 2024–25: Ceredigion League Second Division, 4th of 10
Home colours	Away colours

Bargod Rangers A.F.C. is a Welsh football club based in Drefach Felindre, Carmarthenshire. The team currently plays in the Ceredigion League Second Division.

The club dates back to the 1880s. They started out as a hockey team, before switching to football in the 1900s. They were a founder member of the Ceredigion League in 1921, and were then known as Drefach. The club's name was officially changed from Bargoed Rangers to Bargod Rangers in January 1975, to reflect the correct spelling of the River Bargod, which runs through the village.

In 1981–82, Bargod Rangers played a Welsh Cup second round match at home to Stourbridge, which Stourbridge won 5–0. That was also their only season in the Mid Wales Football League, and they finished 8th of 14 teams.

== Honours ==
- Ceredigion League Division One - Champions: 1924–25, 1925–26, 1931–32, 1946–47, 1954–55, 1957–58, 1961–62, 1966–67, 1972–73, 1978–79, 1980–81
- Ceredigion League Division Two - Champions: 1983–84, 1996–97
- Ceredigion League Reserves Cup (Division Three) - Champions: 1983–84, 2011–12
- Ceredigion League Cup - Winners: 1957–58, 1961–62, 1965–66, 1970–71, 2013–14
- Ceredigion Cup - Winners: 1981–82, 1983–84, 1987–88, 1991–92, 1996–97
- Bay Cup - Winners: 1957–58, 1961–62, 1965–66, 1973–74, 1975–76, 1976–77, 1978–79
- South Cards Cup - Winners: 2008–09
- Youth Cup - Winners: 2010–11, 2011–12
- Easter Monday Cup - Winners: 2014
