= J. Emrys Morgan Cup =

- Founded: 1972
- Region: Wales
- Current champions: Carno (2025–26)
- Most championships: Llanfair Caereinion/ United (5 titles)
- Website: Emrys Morgan Cup

J. Emrys Morgan Cup is an association football knockout cup competition for football clubs in the lower leagues of the Football Association of Wales pyramid in Mid Wales. The competition is run by the Central Wales Football Association. It consists of a round by round knockout with semi-finals and the final played a neutral ground. Teams are drawn to play each other home or away in rounds up to the semi-finals. The following leagues are covered by the cup:

- Aberystwyth League
- Ceredigion League
- Mid Wales South League
- Montgomeryshire Football League

== Previous winners ==
- 1972–73: – Aberystwyth Town reserves
- 1973–74: – Llansantffraid
- 1974–75: – Ffostrasol
- 1975–76: – Llanfyllin
- 1976–77: – Newcastle Emlyn
- 1977–78: – Llanfair Caereinion
- 1978–79: – Welshpool Rangers
- 1979–80: – Builth Wells
- 1980–81: – Newtown reserves
- 1981–82: – Aber A.C.
- 1982–83: – Bow Street
- 1983–84: – Llanfair Caereinion
- 1984–85: – Vale of Arrow
- 1985–86: – Llanfair Caereinion
- 1986–87: – Maesglas
- 1987–88: – Maesglas
- 1988–89: – Vale of Arrow
- 1989–90: – Llangedwyn
- 1990–91: – Llanfair Caereinion
- 1991–92: – Newcastle Emlyn
- 1992–93: – Dewi Stars
- 1993–94: – Sennybridge
- 1994–95: – St Dogmaels
- 1995–96: – Kerry
- 1996–97: – Padarn United
- 1997–98: – Saron
- 1998–99: – Cardigan Town
- 1999–2000: – Bow Street
- 2000–01: – Talybont
- 2001–02: – Dolgellau Athletic
- 2002–03: – Aberaeron
- 2003–04: – Knighton Town
- 2004–05: – Rhosgoch Rangers
- 2005–06: – Bow Street
- 2006–07: – Tregaron Turfs
- 2007–08: – Penparcau
- 2008–09: – Hay St. Marys
- 2009–10: – Llandrindod Wells
- 2010–11: – New Quay
- 2011–12: – Penybont United
- 2012–13: – Borth United
- 2013–14: – Lampeter Town
- 2014–15: – Cardigan Town
- 2015–16: – Llanfair United reserves
- 2016–17: – Llandysul
- 2017–18: – Newcastle Emlyn
- 2018–19: – Penparcau
- 2019–20: – Competition cancelled due to the COVID-19 pandemic
- 2020–21: – Competition cancelled due to the COVID-19 pandemic
- 2021–22: – Brecon Corries
- 2022–23: – Barmouth & Dyffryn United
- 2023–24: – Montgomery Town
- 2024–25: – Barmouth & Dyffryn United
- 2025–26: – Carno
