= Carmarthen Park =

Public park in Carmarthen, Wales

Coordinates: 51.855°N 4.316°W

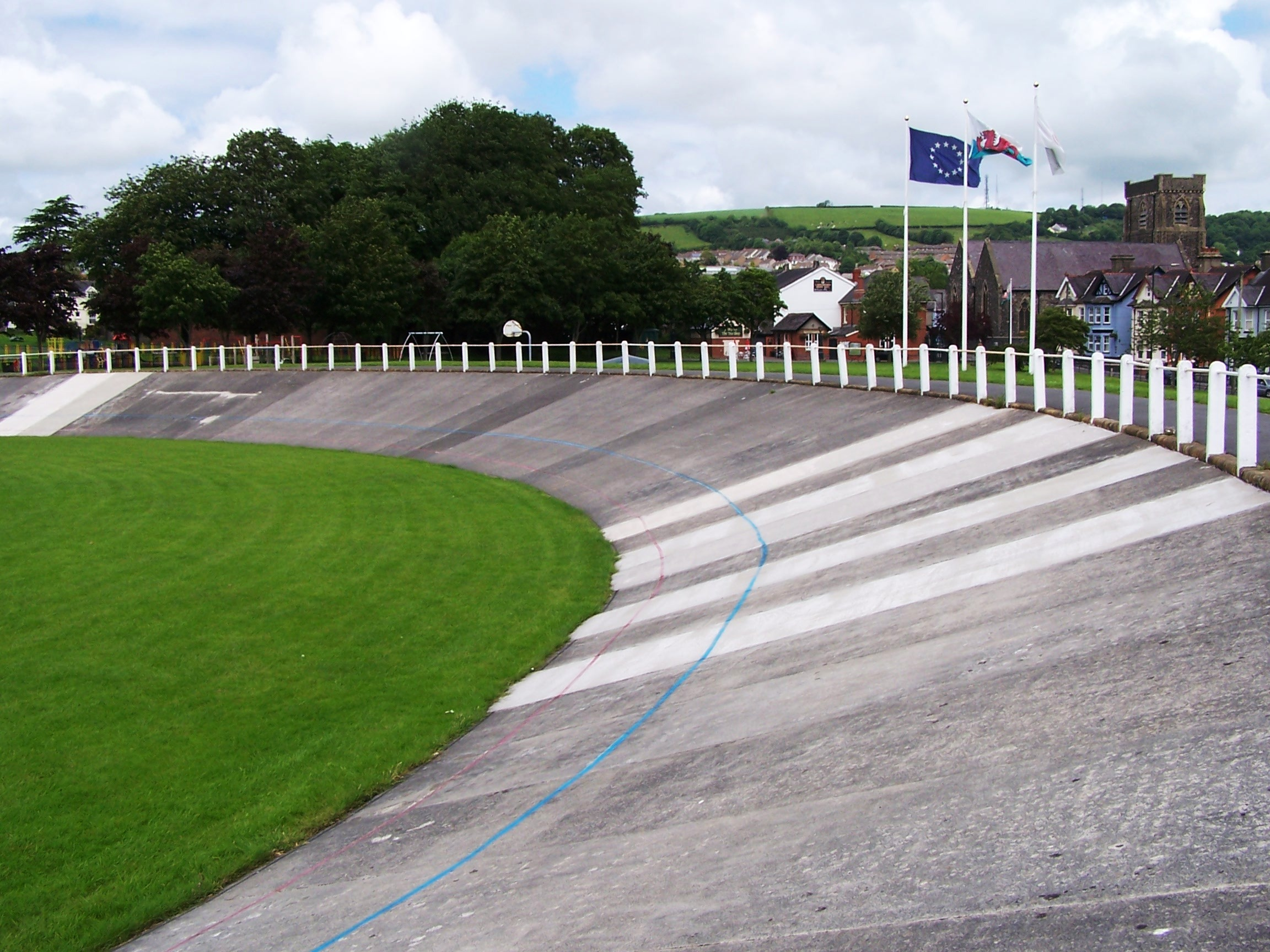
Carmarthen Park Velodrome in 2003

Carmarthen Park is located in Carmarthen, Wales, and contains many recreational and sporting facilities including a velodrome.

== Velodrome ==
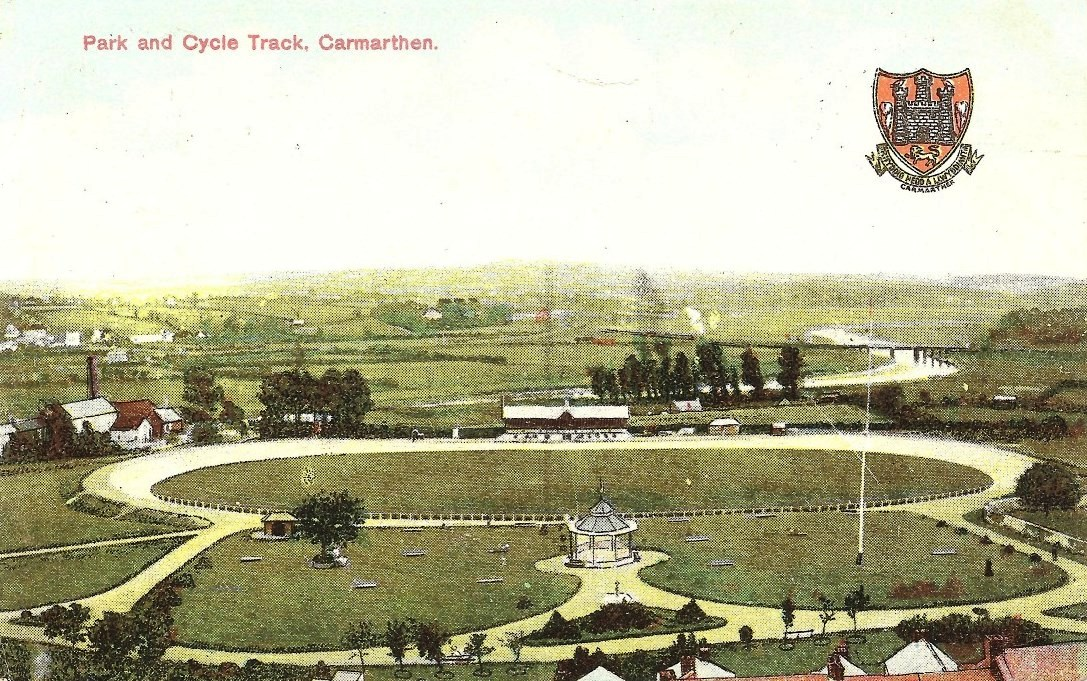
A postcard of the park from 1908

The velodrome is 405.38 metres long, and is the centre piece of Carmarthen Park. Officially opened on Easter Monday in 1900, it has been in continuous use ever since, and is believed to be the oldest outdoor concrete velodrome in continuous use in the world. Here the concept of 'pacing' was first introduced, whereby each cyclist achieves higher speeds by racing in the slipstream of a motor cyclist.

In 2015, a risk assessment found that the velodrome was unsafe. It was renovated and reopened in 2017.

== Park use ==
The park as a whole, including the grassed area enclosed by the velodrome, is used for festivals, games, concerts, fairs, pop concerts, brass band recitals, historical re-enactments, jousting, circuses (non-animal), school and college field studies and team-building exercises. The park is well used every day on an informal basis by all age groups. The skateboard facility is popular with young people, and there is play equipment for children.

Sited on sloping, south-facing ground, the park forms a natural amphitheatre and is landscaped with mature trees. Most of the original 1900 features are still present – including decorative iron entrance gates and bandstand. Carmarthen Park is managed by Carmarthen Town Council.

== See also ==
- List of cycling tracks and velodromes
