= Lampeter Town Hall =

Municipal Building in Lampeter, Wales

- Neuadd y Dref Llanbedr Pont Steffan (Welsh)
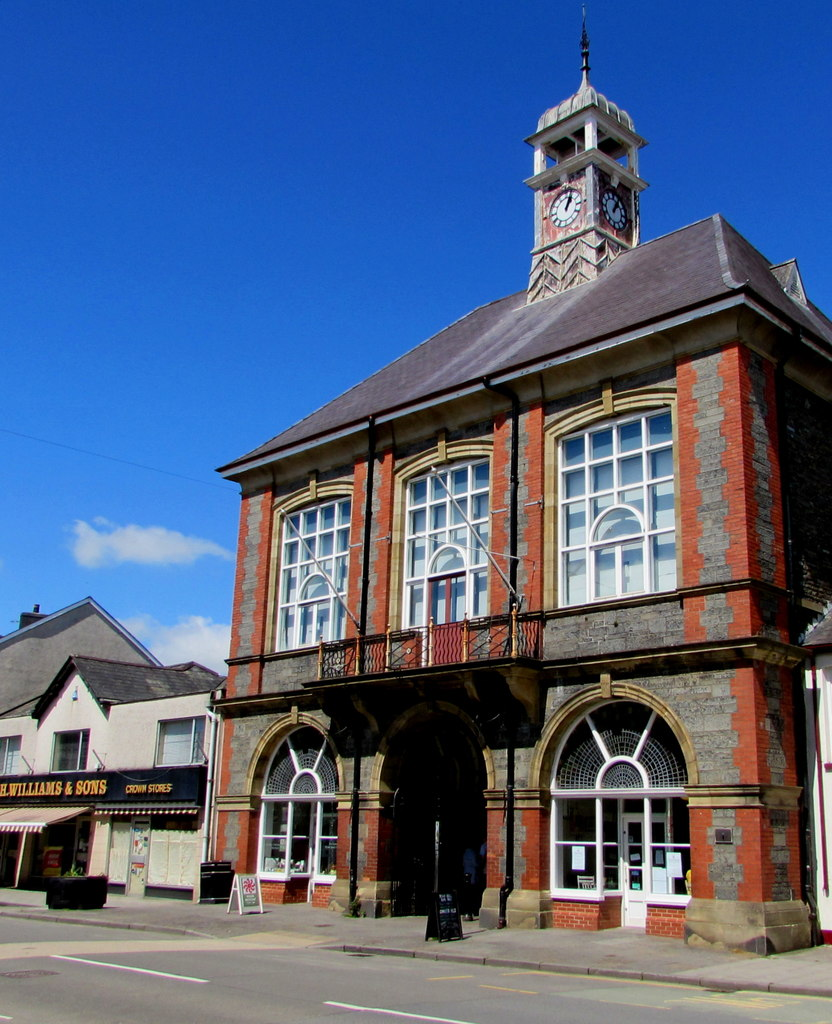
- Lampeter Town Hall

- Shown in Ceredigion
- 52.1131°N 4.0806°W
- Location: High Street, Lampeter

History
- Built: 1881

Site notes
- Architect: Robert Jewell Withers
- Architectural style: Queen Anne Revival style

Listed Building – Grade II
- Official name: The Town Hall
- Designated: 11 March 1992
- Reference no.: 10439

Lampeter Town Hall (Welsh: Neuadd y Dref Llanbedr Pont Steffan) is a municipal structure in the High Street, Lampeter, Wales. The town hall, which was the meeting place of Lampeter Borough Council, is a Grade II listed building.

== History ==
The first town hall in Lampeter, which was commissioned by the lord of the manor and partner in Harford Bank of Bristol, Richard Hart Davis, was designed by Peter Frederick Robinson and completed in 1818. Davis got into financial difficulty in 1819 and sold his estate, which included the town hall, to his son-in-law, John Scandrett Harford, of Blaise Castle in 1820.

In the late 1870s, after the first town hall became dilapidated, the trustees of a Harford descendent, John Battersby Harford, offered to demolish it and to replace it with a new building. The new building was designed by Robert Jewell Withers in the Queen Anne Revival style, built in grey brick with red brick quoins at a cost of £4,000 and was completed in 1881. The design involved a symmetrical main frontage with three bays facing onto the High Street; the ground floor was arcaded with the central bay forming a carriageway and the outer openings being glazed to form two shops. On the first floor, there were three large mullioned windows, each of which were flanked by quoins, and there was a central wrought iron balcony supported by stone brackets. At roof level, there was a cornice and a central cupola with a clock with an ogee-sharped dome. The clock was designed and manufactured by Gillett and Bland of Croydon. Internally, the principal room was the main hall.

The borough council, which met in the town hall, was reformed under the Municipal Corporations Act 1883. Following the implementation of the Local Government Act 1888, which established county councils in every county, it became necessary to establish a meeting place for the newly formed Cardiganshire County Council; the new county council regularly met in the town hall although offices were established for the county officials at the former town hall in Aberaeron in 1910.

The main hall was used once a year for the quarter sessions: it was the venue for the trial of Captain William Killick who was accused and eventually acquitted of the attempted murder of the poet, Dylan Thomas, in March 1945.

The building continued to serve as the headquarters of the Lampeter Borough Council for much of the 20th century but ceased to be the local seat of government after Ceredigion District Council was formed in 1974. The Lord Chancellor's Department announced the closure of the building as a venue for magistrates' court hearings with effect from December 1994. Following a change of ownership and an extensive programme of refurbishment works, which involved conversion of the building into the Jen Jones Welsh Quilt Centre, the building was officially re-opened by the Prince of Wales and Duchess of Cornwall in July 2010. Although the Welsh Quilt Centre closed as a permanent feature in May 2018, the owners announced their intention to host temporary quilt exhibitions in the building.
