= Ceredigion League =

Football league in Wales

- Founded: 1921
- Country: Wales
- Divisions: 3
- Number of clubs: 32
- Level on pyramid: 5–7
- Promotion to: Central Wales Football League
- Current champions: Llechryd (2025–26)
- Most championships: St Dogmaels (13 titles)

The Ceredigion League (known as The Costcutter Ceredigion League for sponsorship purposes) is a Welsh football league for the southern parts of Ceredigion. It is at the fifth to seventh levels of the Welsh football league system.

== History ==
It was founded in 1921 as the Cardiganshire League in Lampeter. The eleven founding teams were Aberaeron, Aberystwyth Battery, Conservative FC, College Reserves, Drefach, Lampeter, Llandysul, Llanybydder, Newcastle Emlyn, Padarn United and Parish Hall United. Newcastle Emlyn withdrew from the league without playing any games.

In the 1970s the Cardiganshire League had just 10 or 11 teams and the region had no junior football competitions. Facilities were poor with even the league's top teams having changing rooms at a nearby hall or garage. By the 2004–05 season it had considerably improved; the league now included 33 teams from 18 clubs (a majority of clubs had reserve sides), many clubs had "excellent facilities" and teams including Lampeter Town and Newcastle Emlyn had installed floodlights.

In July 1998 the league was under threat of suspension by the Football Association of Wales (FAW), due to a rule regarding "senior" players. The Cardiganshire League rules stated that only one "senior player" (who had played 6 or more games in another league) could play in one Cardiganshire League match, however the FAW introduced a rule in 1997 stating a player could sign for two clubs without any restriction in league games. Many involved with the league were unhappy with the situation, stating that the rule had been brought in for "obvious reasons" and removing it could make a "mockery" of the league.

The league renamed to the Ceredigion League in 2004.

=== Sponsorship ===
Period	Sponsored league name
before 1986–87	unknown / unsponsored
1986–87 to 1990–91	Rowley's Double Glazing Cardiganshire League
1991–92 to 2002–03	L'Hirondelle Cardiganshire League
2003–04	unknown
2004–05 to present	Costcutter Ceredigion League

== Member clubs for 2026–27 season ==
=== Premier Division ===
- Cardigan Town
- Crymych
- Lampeter Town (reserves)
- Llanboidy
- Llandysul
- Llechryd
- Maesglas
- Newcastle Emlyn
- St Dogmaels

=== First Division ===
- Aberaeron
- Bargod Rangers
- Crannog
- Dewi Stars
- Felinfach (reserves)
- Ffostrasol Wanderers (reserves)
- Llanon
- Llechryd (reserves)
- New Quay
- Pencader United
- St Dogmaels (reserves)

=== Reserve Division East ===
- Aberaeron
- Crannog (reserves)
- Lampeter Town (thirds)
- Llandysul (reserves)
- Pencader United (reserves)
- Tregaron Turfs (reserves)

=== Reserve Division East ===
- Cardigan Town (reserves)
- Crymych (reserves)
- Llanboidy (reserves)
- Maesglas (reserves)
- Newcastle Emlyn (reserves)
- St Dogmaels (thirds)

== First Division champions ==
Information provided from league website. Those years empty are not known. The league was not running from 1934 to 1946, due to the creation of the Aberystwyth League.

=== 1920s ===
- 1921–22: Llandysul
- 1922–23:
- 1923–24: Padarn United
- 1924–25:
- 1925–26: Bargoed Rangers
- 1926–27: Llanybydder
- 1927–28:
- 1928–29:
- 1929–30: Newcastle Emlyn

=== 1930s ===
- 1930–31: Newcastle Emlyn
- 1931–32: Bargoed Rangers
- 1932–33: Aberaeron

=== 1940s ===
- 1946–47: Bargoed Rangers
- 1947–48: Newcastle Emlyn
- 1948–49: Llandysul
- 1949–50: Cilgerran

=== 1950s ===
- 1950–51: uncompleted
- 1951–52: Llanybydder
- 1952–53: Aberaeron
- 1953–54: Aberaeron
- 1954–55: Bargoed Rangers
- 1955–56: Aberaeron
- 1956–57: Newcastle Emlyn
- 1957–58: Bargoed Rangers
- 1958–59: Tregaron Turfs
- 1959–60: Aberaeron

=== 1960s ===
- 1960–61: St Dogmaels
- 1961–62: Bargoed Rangers
- 1962–63: Beulah
- 1963–64: St David's College
- 1964–65: St Dogmaels
- 1965–66: St Dogmaels
- 1966–67: Bargoed Rangers
- 1967–68: Ffostrasol Wanderers
- 1968–69: Cardigan Town
- 1969–70: Ffostrasol Wanderers

=== 1970s ===
- 1970–71: Ffostrasol Wanderers
- 1971–72: Ffostrasol Wanderers
- 1972–73: Bargoed Rangers
- 1973–74: St Dogmaels
- 1974–75: Ffostrasol Wanderers
- 1975–76: Newcastle Emlyn
- 1976–77: Ffostrasol Wanderers
- 1977–78: Newcastle Emlyn
- 1978–79: Bargod Rangers
- 1979–80: Ffostrasol Wanderers

=== 1980s ===
- 1980–81: Bargod Rangers
- 1981–82: Aberaeron
- 1982–83: Maesglas
- 1983–84: Newcastle Emlyn
- 1984–85: Maesglas
- 1985–86: Newcastle Emlyn
- 1986–87: Maesglas
- 1987–88: Newcastle Emlyn
- 1988–89: Maesglas
- 1989–90: Newcastle Emlyn

=== 1990s ===
- 1990–91: Dewi Stars
- 1991–92: St Dogmaels
- 1992–93: St Dogmaels
- 1993–94: St Dogmaels
- 1994–95: St Dogmaels
- 1995–96: Cardigan Town
- 1996–97: St Dogmaels
- 1997–98: Dewi Stars
- 1998–99: Newcastle Emlyn
- 1999–2000: Cardigan Town

=== 2000s ===
- 2000–01: Cardigan Town
- 2001–02: Aberaeron
- 2002–03: Cardigan Town
- 2003–04: Crannog
- 2004–05: Lampeter Town
- 2005–06: Lampeter Town
- 2006–07: St Dogmaels
- 2007–08: Maesglas
- 2008–09: Lampeter Town
- 2009–10: Cardigan Town

=== 2010s ===
- 2010–11: New Quay
- 2011–12: New Quay
- 2012–13: New Quay
- 2013–14: Newcastle Emlyn reserves
- 2014–15: Cardigan Town
- 2015–16: Cardigan Town
- 2016–17: Llandysul
- 2017–18: Lampeter Town
- 2018–19: St Dogmaels
- 2019–20: St Dogmaels

=== 2020s ===
- 2020–21: No competition
- 2021–22: St Dogmaels
- 2022–23: Ffostrasol Wanderers
- 2023–24: Ffostrasol Wanderers
- 2024–25: Lampeter Town
- 2025–26: Llechryd

=== First Division titles by club ===
- St Dogmaels – 13
- Newcastle Emlyn – 12 (11 + 1 reserves)
- Bargoed Rangers – 10
- Ffostrasol Wanderers – 9
- Cardigan Town – 8
- Aberaeron – 7
- Lampeter Town – 5
- Maesglas – 5
- Llandysul – 3
- New Quay – 3
- Dewi Stars – 2
- Llanybydder – 2
- Beulah – 1
- Cilgerran – 1
- Crannog – 1
- Llechryd – 1
- Padarn United – 1
- St. David's College – 1
- Tregaron Turfs – 1

== Cup Competitions ==
Teams from the Ceredigion League can compete in 6 different cups:

- Bay Cup - only 1st teams.
- League Cup - only 1st teams and reserve sides that do not have their 1st teams participating in this league.
- Cwpan Coffa Dai 'Dynamo' Davies - same teams who participate in the League Cup, with their equivalent from the Aberystwyth League. (known as the Cwpan Ceredigion until 2012)
- Percy Eldridge Cup - only the reserve sides which have their 1st teams participating in the league.
- South Cards Cup - all teams from Division 2 and the teams from the Reserve Cup which do not have their 1st teams in Division 2.
- J. Emrys Morgan Cup - same teams who participate in the League Cup, with their equivalent from the Aberystwyth League, Montgomeryshire League and the Mid Wales South League.
