= Maesglas F.C. =

Football club based in Ceredigion

Maesglas
- Full name: Maesglas Football Club
- Nickname: The Blues
- Founded: 1974, 2004
- Dissolved: 1993
- Ground: Maes Radley Playing Field
- League: Ceredigion League First Division
- 2024–25: Ceredigion League Second Division, 2nd of 10 (promoted)
Home colours	Away colours

Maesglas Football Club is a Welsh football club based in the housing estate of Maesglas, in Cardigan, Ceredigion. The team plays in the Ceredigion League First Division.

== History ==
Maesglas Football Club was founded in 1974 by five youngsters from the Maesglas housing estate. They joined the Cardiganshire League and played at a field at Penlan Farm. They played there for two years before the field was given to the National Eisteddfod. The club then moved to RAF Aberporth, about six miles from Cardigan, with a cowshed serving as changing rooms. They remained there for the next four seasons before disbanding in 1980. On 20 July 1980, John Adey became secretary, and within a day the club had reversed their disbanding, and acquired a new pitch at Dolwerdd and changing rooms at Cardigan Secondary School. 1980–81 was a poor season on the pitch, but success was soon to follow.

The club's first trophy came in 1981–82, winning the League Cup. In the following season, they won the league and the Bay Cup. The club went trophyless in 1983–84, but regained both the league and the Bay Cup in 1984–85. They defended neither title in 1985–86, but still won a double of the League Cup and the South Cards Cup.

In 1986–87, Maesglas won seven competitions: the league, North Cards Cup, Bay Cup, League Cup, J. Emrys Morgan Cup, Percy Eldridge Cup, and the Goodwick Cup. This set a new league record, which the Carmarthen Journal noted "may never be surpassed". In the following season, they won the North Cards Cup, South Cards Cup, Bay Cup, League Cup, J. Emrys Morgan Cup, and were runners-up in the league and Goodwick Cup, as well as the reserves winning Division Two. Success continued in the next season, winning the league, League Cup, North Cards Cup, South Cards Cup, Bay Cup and the reserves winning Division Two. In December 1989, Maesglas's struggles were apparent, with the team already out of the J. Emrys Morgan Cup, and with no youth policy it seemed unlikely for them to return to their old heights. The club went on to again win the League Cup in that season, and in 1991–92 the reserves won the Reserve Cup, in what would be the club's last silverware before folding. After only three players attended a pre-season trial match in August 1993, the club folded.

Maesglas Football Club was reformed in 2004. In their first season, they won the South Cards Cup, and the reserves won the Reserve Cup. In June 2005, doubts were cast over the club's future, with the club claiming that county council officers were "not showing any willingness to help" with extending their use of Maes Radley Playing Field for the next season. The council did support the bid. In the following season they won the Percy Eldridge Cup. In 2006 they were again able to secure another 12 months at Maes Radley.

In 2006–07, they won Division Two, the South Cards Cup, and the reserves won the Reserve Cup. Maesglas also lost in the finals of the League Cup and Youth Cup. In 2007–08 they won Division One. In August 2008 they lost the Eddy Merry Memorial Cup final to the Pembrokeshire Senior Cup holders Pennar Robins.

In 2024–25, the team won the South Cards Cup as well as finishing runners-up in Division Two. They were promoted to Division One.

== Honours ==
- Ceredigion League Division One - Champions: 1982–83, 1984–85, 1986–87, 1988–89, 2007–08
- Ceredigion League Division Two - Champions: 1987–88 (reserves), 1988–89 (reserves), 2006–07
- Ceredigion League Division Three / Reserve Cup - Champions: 1982–83, 1986–87, 1991–92, 2004–05, 2005–06, 2006–07
- Ceredigion League Cup - Winners: 1981–82, 1985–86, 1986–87, 1987–88, 1988–89, 1989–90
- South Cards Cup - Winners: 1985–86, 1987–88, 1988–89, 2004–05, 2006–07, 2024–25
- J. Emrys Morgan Cup - Winners: 1986–87, 1987–88
- Percy Eldridge Cup - Winners: 1986–87, 2005–06
- North Cards Cup - Winners: 1986–87, 1987–88, 1988–89
- Bay Cup - Winners: 1982–83, 1984–85, 1986–87, 1987–88, 1988–89
- Goodwick Cup - Winners: 1986–87
