= Aberaeron F.C. =

Association football club in Wales

Aberaeron
- Full name: Aberaeron Amateur Football Club
- Nicknames: Black and Ambers
- Founded: 1921
- Ground: Cae'r Lli
- League: Ceredigion League Second Division
- 2024–25: Ceredigion League Second Division, 8th of 10
Home colours	Away colours

Aberaeron Amateur Football Club is a Welsh football team based in Aberaeron, Ceredigion, Wales. The team plays in the Ceredigion League Second Division.

== History ==
The club's website suggests the club was formed in the late 1800s. The club were a founder member of the Cardiganshire League and saw success as six times champions of the top league (four times in the 1950s) and nine times winners of the league's cup competition.

In 2010–11 they joined the newly created Mid Wales Football League Division Two. The following season they were crowned champions and promoted to Division One for the 2012–13 season.

In July 2020 the club was announced as one of the tier 4 clubs in the restructured West Division of the Mid Wales Football League.

== Honours ==
- Ceredigion League Division One – Champions (7):1932–33, 1952–53; 1953–54; 1955–56; 1959–60; 1981–82; 2001–02
- Ceredigion League Division Two – Champions (3): 1992–93; 2003–04 (reserves); 2010–11 (reserves)
- Ceredigion League Cup – Winners (9): 1922–23; 1948–49; 1953–54; 1954–55; 1956–57; 1959–60; 1996–97; 2002–03; 2006–07
- Mid Wales Football League Division Two – Champions (1): 2011–12
- CWFA Challenge Cup – Winners: 2016–17
