= Lampeter Town A.F.C. =

Association football club in Wales

Lampeter Town
- Full name: Lampeter Town Association Football Club
- Ground: North Road
- League: Central Wales Southern Division
- 2025–26: Central Wales Southern Division, 2nd of 13

Lampeter Town are a Welsh football club from Lampeter in Ceredigion, Wales. They play in the Central Wales Southern Division.

== History ==
Lampeter were founder members of the Cardiganshire League in 1921, finishing bottom of the southern section in the league's inaugural season.

For the 2025–26 season the team was promoted for the first time to a tier four league. This came after finishing as league champions of the Ceredigion League and gaining tier four certification.

== Ground ==
The club plays its home matches at North Road. The ground has floodlights.

== Honours ==
- Ceredigion League
  - First Division – Champions (5): 2004–05, 2005–06, 2008–09, 2017–18, 2024–25
  - First Division – Runners-up (4): 1958–59, 2003–04, 2012–13, 2015–16
  - Second Division – Champions (2): 2022–23, 2025–26 (reserves)
  - Second Division – Runners-up (2): 1980–81, 1996–97
  - Third Division – Champions (reserves): 1987–88 , 1992–93, 1995–96, 1996–97, 2002–03, 2009–10, 2023–24
  - Third Division – Runners-up (reserves): 1991–92, 2006–07, 2013–14, 2016–17, 2018–19
- J. Emrys Morgan Cup
  - Winners: 2013–14
- Cwpan Ceredigion
  - Winners: 2013–14
  - Finalists: 2006–07, 2008–09
- Bay Cup
  - Winners: 1954–55, 2005–06
  - Finalists: 1957–58, 1973–74, 1981–82, 1982–83, 1991–92, 2007–08, 2012–13, 2013–14, 2015–16, 2023–24
- South Cards Cup/ Division Two Cup:
  - Winners: 2003–04, 2014–15 (reserves)
- Percy Eldridge Cup
  - Winners (reserves): 1979–80, 1980–81, 2006–07
  - Finalists (reserves): 1991–92, 1992–93, 2012–13, 2015–16, 2016–17, 2024–25
