= West Wales Football Association =

Football governing body in west Wales

The West Wales Football Association (WWFA; Welsh: Cymdeithas Bêl-droed Orllewin Cymru) is the governing body of association football in West Wales and is affiliated to the Football Association of Wales. The highest league run solely by the West Wales Football Association will be the West Wales Premier League at Tier 4 of the Welsh League Pyramid, when it commences in the 2020–21 season.

All clubs playing according to the laws of the Football Association of Wales and having their grounds and headquarters west of a line drawn from Briton Ferry, Neath, northwards to Glynneath, and then again northwards to the boundary line of the South Wales Football Association shall be eligible for membership.

The WWFA originally operated under the South Wales and Monmouthshire Football Association, but became independent after the SWMFA was split in 1968.

== Affiliated leagues and clubs ==
The WWFA has senior men's, senior women's, junior men's and junior girls' clubs affiliated to it. The senior men's leagues are the Carmarthenshire League, Neath & District League, Pembrokeshire League, Swansea Senior League and West Wales Premier League. Other Leagues include the West Wales Youth League and West Wales Womens & Girls AFL.

Additionally, teams that compete in the South Wales United Churches League from outside the area are also affiliated to the WWFA - AC Pontypridd, Aberaman Pentecostal, Bethany Ynyshir, Bethel Baptist (Rhondda), Bethlehem Life Centre (Bridgend), Highfields & St Denys (Cardiff), Inter Churches Aberdare, Penarth Vale, R B C United (Cardiff), Rhondda Royals, Tab Life Centre (Newport), U C Bridgend and Woodville Baptist (Cardiff).

All clubs are split into three groups - Classes A, B and C - with the teams plying their trade in the Premier League (Swansea City), the Welsh Premier League and Welsh Football League in the top class.

== WWFA knock-out competitions ==
- WWFA Senior Cup - this ceased in 2009 after 86 years in existence
- WWFA Intermediate Cup
- WWFA Youth Cup
- WWFA Junior Cup
- WWFA Under-13s Cup
