= Robert Jewell Withers =

English architect (1824–1894)

- Born: 2 February 1824; Shepton Mallet, Somerset, England
- Died: 7 October 1894 (aged 70); London, England
- Occupation: Architect
- Spouse: Catherine Mary Vaux
- Children: 4 sons, 5 daughters
- Parent(s): John Alexander Withers; Maria Jewell
- Relatives: Frederick Clarke Withers (brother)

Robert Jewell Withers (1824–1894) was an English ecclesiastical architect.

== Early life ==
Robert Jewell Withers was born on 2 February 1824 in Shepton Mallet, Somerset, England. His father was John Alexander Withers and his mother, Maria Jewell. He had a brother, Frederick Clarke Withers, who also became an architect and worked in America.

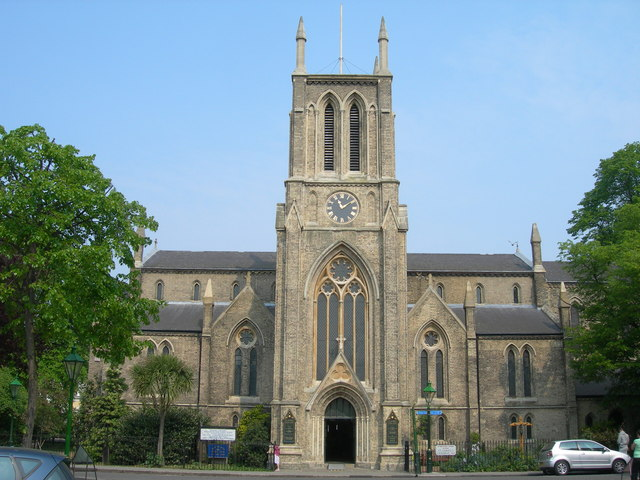
St James' Church, Norlands

== Career ==
Withers began his career as an architect in Sherborne, Dorset, in 1848. He was articled in 1839 to Thomas Hellyer (1811–1894) in Ryde on the Isle of Wight, who specialised in church work. In 1844 he made a tour of England and the Continent, then returned to Sherborne where he set up practice in 1848. He became an Associate of the Royal Institute of British Architects (RIBA) in 1849 and moved to London the following year. He opened an office in 1854 and, except for 1855 to 1859 when he was based on Doughty Street in Holborn, worked out of premises in the Adelphi, the Adam Brothers' development just off the Strand. He became a member of RIBA in 1873.

His works include St Mary's, Bourne Street, as well as the restoration of St Paul's Church, Knightsbridge, and James Gibbs's St Mary-le-Strand in 1871, where his benches and tiled floor remain.

== Selected works ==
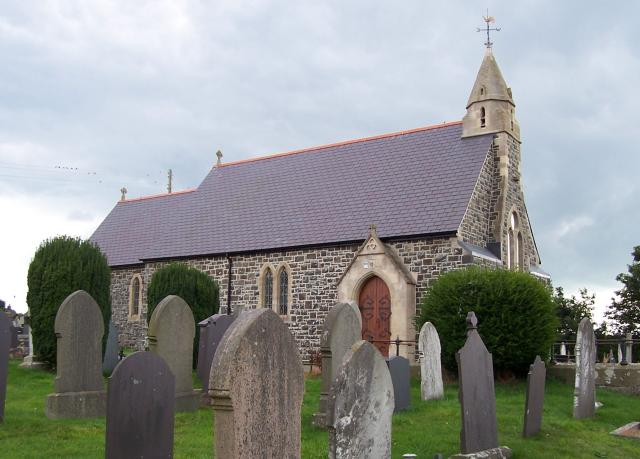
St David's Church, Henfynyw

- 1863–1865: St Dogfael, Meline, Pembrokeshire – rebuilding
- 1864–1866: St David's, Henfynyw, Cardiganshire – rebuilding
- 1876: St James, Norlands, Holland Park – addition of chancel and vestries to the 1845 building designed by Lewis Vulliamy
- 1874: St Mary's, Bourne Street, Westminster
- 1879: St James, Avebury, Wiltshire – chancel largely rebuilt

== Personal life ==
Withers married Catherine Vaux on 20 April 1854 at the parish church in Croydon. They had four sons and five daughters. He was an organist at St John's Church, Kennington.

Withers died on 7 October 1894 in London.
