= Herefordshire Senior Cup =

Herefordshire County Senior Cup
- Founded: 1951
- Region: Herefordshire
- Teams: 15
- Current champions: Westfields
- Most championships: Westfields (12 titles)

The Senior Cup, was formed in 1951 when Ansells Brewery presented Herefordshire FA with the trophy. In the early days the Senior cup became an annual invitation Final. The final often varied in the early years between being a two legged affair or a single match. In 2009 the competition was merged with the much older competition known as the County Challenge Cup, is the county cup for the Herefordshire County Football Association (HCFA). According to the current rules of the competition, it is open to all clubs whose affiliation is with the HCFA. The current holders are Westfields F.C. who won the 2023 competition.

== History ==
The HCFA covers the ceremonial county of Herefordshire. The Cup in its current format was competed in 2009 and was won by Westfields F.C.

=== Winners ===
| | Challenge Cup | | | Senior Cup | | |
| Season | Winner | Score | Runner-up | Winner | Score | Runner-up |
|---|---|---|---|---|---|---|
| 1971–72 | | – | | Hereford United | – | Wigan Athletic |
| 1972–73 | | – | | Hereford United | – | Shrewsbury Town |
| 1973–74 | | – | | | – | |
| 1974–75 | | – | | | – | |
| 1975–76 | | – | | | – | |
| 1976–77 | | – | | Hereford United | 1–0 | Stoke City |
| 1977–78 | | – | | | – | |
| 1978–79 | | – | | | – | |
| 1979–80 | | – | | | – | |
| 1980–81 | | – | | Hereford United | 2–1 | Birmingham City |
| 1981–82 | | – | | | – | |
| 1982–83 | | – | | | – | |
| 1983–84 | | – | | | – | |
| 1984–85 | | – | | | – | |
| 1985–86 | Westfields | – | Hinton | Shrewsbury Town | – | Hereford United |
| 1986–87 | Army | – | Pegasus Juniors | Hereford United | – | Shrewsbury Town |
| 1987–88 | Pegasus Juniors | – | | | – | |
| 1988–89 | Westfields | – | Hinton | Swindon Town | 2–0 | Hereford United |
| 1989–90 | | – | | Swindon Town | 5–4 | Hereford United |
| 1990–91 | Fownhope | – | Ewyas Harold | | – | Hereford United |
| 1991–92 | Westfields | – | Pegasus Juniors | Hereford United | (shared) | Chester City |
| 1992–93 | Hinton | – | Westfields | Hereford United | – | |
| 1993–94 | Hinton | – | Pegasus Juniors | | – | |
| 1994–95 | Hinton | – | Pegasus Juniors | | – | Hereford United |
| 1995–96 | Westfields | – | Ross Town | Hereford United | – | |
| 1996–97 | Bromyard Town | – | Ledbury Town | | – | Hereford United |
| 1997–98 | Ross Town | – | Kington Town | Shrewsbury Town | – | Hereford United |
| 1998–99 | Pegasus Juniors | – | Ross Town | | – | |
| 1999-2000 | Bromyard Town | – | Ewyas Harold | Newport County | 1–0 | Hereford United |
| 2000–01 | Kington Town | – | Ross Town | | – | |
| 2001–02 | Westfields | – | Kington Town | Hereford United | 2–1 | Swansea City |
| 2002–03 | Westfields | – | Kington Town | Not held | – | |
| 2003–04 | Kington Town | – | Ledbury Town | Hereford United | 3–1 | Forest Green Rovers |
| 2004–05 | Westfields | – | Wellington | Hereford United | 3–0 | Westfields |
| 2005–06 | Westfields | – | Hinton | Hereford United | 4–1 | Westfields |
| 2006–07 | Ledbury Town | – | Wellington | Hereford United | 3–0 | Ledbury Town |
| 2007–08 | Westfields | – | Pegasus Juniors | Hereford United | 3–0 | Westfields |
| 2008–09 | Wellington | 2–2* | Westfields | Westfields | 3–0 | Bromyard Town |
| 2009–10 | Ledbury Town | 3–0 | Westfields | Hereford United | 8–0 | Wellington |
| 2010–11 | Westfields | 3–1 | Wellington | Hereford United | 2–0 | Ledbury Town |
| 2011–12 | Westfields | 3–0 | Ewyas Harold | Westfields | 3–2 | Hereford United |
| 2012–13 | Westfields | 3–2 | Ledbury Town | Hereford United | 2–0 | Westfields |
| 2013–14 | Westfields | 3–1 | Pegasus Juniors | Westfields | 1–1* | Hereford United |
| 2014–15 | Westfields | 3–1^{†} | Wellington | Hereford United | P–P | Westfields |
| 2015–16 | Hereford | 5–1 | Westfields | Westfields | 5–3 | Slimbridge |
| 2016–17 | Hereford | 3–0 | Hereford Lads Club | Merthyr Town | 2–1 | Hereford |
| 2017–18 | Hereford | 6–0 | Hereford Lads Club | Hereford | 1–0 | Stourbridge |
| 2018–19 | Westfields | 6–0 | Pegasus Juniors | Cardiff City | 3–0 | Hereford |
| 2019–20 | Not held | | | Cardiff City | 4–4* | Westfields |

The Senior Cup final was not held in 2014 due to the problems at finalist Hereford United, who were subsequently wound up. The Challenge Cup final was not played in 2020 due to the COVID-19 pandemic.

| Season | Winner | Score | Runner-up |
|---|---|---|---|
| 2020–21 | Hereford Lads Club | 4–2 | Westfields |
| 2021–22 | Hartpury University | 2–1 | Hereford |
| 2022–23 | Westfields | 3–1 | Hereford Pegasus |

Westfields have won the competition a record 15 times.

=== Finals ===
9 April 2007

| Ledbury Town | 1 - 0 (a.e.t.) | Wellington F.C. |

Edgar Street, Hereford

24 March 2008
11:00 BST

| Westfields | 2 - 1 | Pegasus Juniors F.C. |

Edgar Street, Hereford

13 April 2009
11:00 BST

| Wellington F.C. | 2 - 2 (a.e.t.) | Westfields |
Penalties
| | 3 - 2 |

Edgar Street, Hereford

5 April 2010
11:00 BST

| Ledbury Town | - | Westfields |

New Street, Ledbury

25 April 2011
11:00 BST

| Westfields | 3 - 1 | Wellington |

Edgar Street, Hereford

9 April 2012
11:00 BST

| Westfields | 3 - 0 | Ewyas Harold F.C. |

Edgar Street, Hereford
Attendance: 723
Referee: Alistair Phillips

17 April 2013
19:30 BST

| Ledbury Town | 2–3 | Westfields |
|---|---|---|
| | Report |

Edgar Street, Hereford
Attendance: 461
Referee: Kevin Morris

23 April 2014
19:30 BST (UTC+01:00)

| Westfields | 3–1 | Pegasus Juniors |
|---|---|---|
| | Report |

Edgar Street, Hereford
Attendance: 320
Referee: Ben Morris
