= Mid Wales South League Cup =

Association football tournament in Wales

- Region: Wales
- Current champions: Talgarth Town (2025–26)
- 2025–26

The Mid Wales (South) League Cup (also known as the Pip Samuel Cup) is a football knockout tournament competed for by clubs who have a team in membership of the Mid Wales South League.

== Winners ==
=== 1960s ===
- 1961–62: – Llanwrtyd
- 1962–63: – Felindre
- 1963–64: – Llanwrtyd
- 1964–65: – Llandrindod Amateurs
- 1965–66: – Whitton
- 1966–67: – Crossgates
- 1967–68: – Crossgates
- 1968–69: –
- 1969–70: – Llandrindod Wells reserves

=== 1970s ===
- 1970–71: – Builth Wells
- 1971–72: – Radnor Valley
- 1972–73: – Llanidloes Town reserves
- 1973–74: – Penybont United
- 1974–75: – Presteigne St. Andrews
- 1975–76: – Builth Wells
- 1976–77: – Aberystwyth Town reserves
- 1977–78: – Llanidloes Town reserves
- 1978–79: – Builth Wells
- 1979–80: – Aberystwyth Town reserves

=== 1980s ===
- 1980–81: – Llanidloes Town reserves
- 1981–82: – Builth Wells
- 1982–83: – Crickhowell
- 1983–84: – Clun Valley
- 1984–85: – Newtown reserves
- 1985–86: – Vale of Arrow (Gladestry)
- 1986–87: – Newtown reserves
- 1987–88: – Clun Valley
- 1988–89: – Kington Town
- 1989–90: – Clun Valley

=== 1990s ===
- 1990–91: – Vale of Arrow (Gladestry)
- 1991–92: – Vale of Arrow (Gladestry)
- 1992–93: – Penybont United
- 1993–94: – Rhayader Town reserves
- 1994–95: – Newcastle
- 1995–96: – Vale of Arrow (Gladestry)
- 1996–97: – Vale of Arrow (Gladestry)
- 1997–98: –
- 1998–99: – Vale of Arrow (Gladestry)
- 1999–2000: – Builth Wells reserves

=== 2000s ===
- 2000–01: –
- 2001–02: –
- 2002–03: –
- 2003–04: – Rhosgoch Rangers
- 2004–05: – Rhosgoch Rangers
- 2005–06: – Rhosgoch Rangers
- 2006–07: – Rhosgoch Rangers
- 2007–08: – Rhayader Town
- 2008–09: –
- 2009–10: – Builth Wells

=== 2010s ===
- 2010–11: – Llandrindod Wells reserves
- 2011–12: – Bucknell
- 2012–13: – Rhayader Town reserves
- 2013–14: – Penybont United
- 2014–15: – Carno reserves
- 2015–16: – Rhayader Town reserves
- 2016–17: – Rhayader Town reserves
- 2017–18: – Rhayader Town
- 2018–19: – Penybont United
- 2019–20: – Competition not completed due to Coronavirus pandemic

=== 2020s ===
- 2020–21: – No competition - Coronavirus pandemic
- 2021–22: – Builth Wells
- 2022–23: – Hay St Marys reserves
- 2023–24: – No competition – league did not operate
- 2024–25: – No competition – league did not operate
- 2025–26: – Talgarth Town
