= 2018–19 FA Vase =

2018–19 Buildbase FA Vase
Football Association Vase

Tournament details
- Country: England; Wales

Final positions
- Champions: Chertsey Town (1st title)
- Runners-up: Cray Valley Paper Mills

The 2018–19 Buildbase FA Vase is the 45th season of the FA Vase, an annual football competition for teams playing below Step 4 of the English National League System. The competition is to be played with two qualifying rounds preceding the six proper rounds, semi-finals (played over two legs) and final to be played at Wembley Stadium. All first-leg ties until the semi-finals are played with extra time if drawn after regulation – first-leg ties may also be resolved with penalties if both teams agree and notify the referee at least 45 minutes before kick-off.

== Calendar ==
The calendar for the 2018–19 Buildbase FA Vase, as announced by The Football Association.

Round	Main Date	Number of Fixtures	Clubs Remaining	New Entries This Round	Losing Club	Winning Club
First round qualifying	1 September 2018	218	638 → 420	436	£ 175	£ 550
Second round qualifying	15 September 2018	187	420 → 233	156	£ 250	£ 725
First round proper	13 October 2018	105	233 → 128	23	£ 275	£ 825
Second round proper	3 November 2018	64	128 → 64	23	£ 300	£ 900
Third round proper	1 December 2018	32	64 → 32	0	£ 375	£ 1,125
Fourth round proper	5 January 2019	16	32 → 16	0	£ 625	£ 1,875
Fifth round proper	2 February 2019	8	16 → 8	0	£ 750	£ 2,250
Quarter-finals	23 February 2019	4	8 → 4	0	£ 1,375	£ 4,125
Semi-finals	16 and 23 March 2019	2	4 → 2	0	£ 1,750	£ 5,500
Final	19 May 2019	1	2 → 1	0	£ 20,000	£ 30,000

== First round qualifying ==
Tie	Home team (tier)	Score	Away team (tier)	Att.
Friday 31 August 2018
5	Whickham (9)	1–0	Jarrow (10)	230
35	AFC Emley (10)	3–4	Litherland REMYCA (9)	199
95	Walsham-le-Willows (9)	3–0	Diss Town (10)	179
103	Wormley Rovers (10)	P–P	Biggleswade United (9)	-
Match abandoned after injury to Wormley Rovers player before kick-off. Match played at Biggleswade United.
150	Bagshot (10)	0–5	Sidlesham (10)	70
152	Lingfield (9)	6–1	Epsom & Ewell (10)	91
188	Christchurch (9)	3–0	Folland Sports (10)	81
Saturday 1 September 2018
1	Alnwick Town (11)	1–2	Charnock Richard (9)	113
2	Stokesley Sports Club (11)	0–9	Guisborough Town (9)	150
3	Holker Old Boys (10)	0–2	Prestwich Heys (10)	26
4	Goole (9)	1–2	Barnoldswick Town (9)	100
6	West Allotment Celtic (10)	3–0	Yorkshire Amateur (9)	44
7	Darlington Railway Athletic (11)	0–5	Bedlington Terriers (10)	35
8	Chester-le-Street Town (10)	1–5	Ryhope Colliery Welfare (9)	116
9	Esh Winning (10)	0–6	Whitley Bay (9)	130
10	Bishop Auckland (9)	2–2	Newton Aycliffe (9)	394
11	North Shields (9)	1–2	Consett (9)	279
12	Daisy Hill (10)	5–2	Whitehaven (11)	36
13	Harrogate Railway Athletic (9)	3–4	Silsden (9)	100
14	Thackley (9)	3–2	Thornaby (10)	110
15	Dunston UTS (9)	2–0	Heaton Stannington (10)	220
16	Team Northumbria (9)	W.O.	Garforth Town (9)	-
Walkover for Garforth Town as Team Northumbria were removed from the competition.
17	Billingham Town (10)	2–0	Campion (10)	188
18	Blyth (9)	W.O.	Crook Town (10)	-
Walkover for Crook Town as Blyth were removed from the tournament as the club folded.
19	Billingham Synthonia (10)	3–1	Knaresborough Town (9)	85
20	Durham City (10)	0–5	Seaham Red Star (9)	78
21	Eccleshill United (9)	0–1	Hebburn Town (9)	111
22	Northallerton Town (10)	2–2	Willington (10)	121
23	Lower Breck (10)	3–1	West Didsbury & Chorlton (9)	101
24	Longridge Town (10)	1–3	Vauxhall Motors (10)	116
25	Worksop Town (9)	2–1	Grimsby Borough (10)	374
26	Burscough (9)	5–1	Alsager Town (10)	68
27	Wythenshawe Town (10)	–	Rylands (10)	-
Both Wythenshawe Town and Rylands were not accepted into the competition.
28	Winsford United (9)	2–1 (a.e.t.)	Liversedge (9)	92
29	Maltby Main (9)	5–1	Ashton Athletic (9)	80
30	Ashton Town (10)	3–1	St. Helens Town (10)	57
31	Barton Town (9)	3–1	AFC Liverpool (10)	139
32	AFC Blackpool (10)	3–1	Nostell Miners Welfare (10)	62
33	Sandbach United (10)	5–1	Athersley Recreation (9)	104
34	Shelley (10)	2–1	Penistone Church (9)	225
36	Swallownest (10)	1–0	Abbey Hey (9)	128
37	Cammell Laird 1907 (10)	2–1	Harworth Colliery (10)	58
38	Armthorpe Welfare (10)	1–2	Worsbrough Bridge Athletic (10)	78
39	Parkgate (10)	5–2 (a.e.t.)	Chadderton (10)	35
40	Congleton Town (9)	1–2	Bootle (9)	150
41	Selby Town (10)	0–5	Staveley Miners Welfare (9)	135
42	Kirby Muxloe (9)	1–2	Brocton (10)	42
43	Nuneaton Griff (10)	3–1	Coton Green (11)	45
44	Littleton (10)	1–0	Lichfield City (10)	47
45	Coventry Sphinx (9)	2–2	Sporting Khalsa (9)	92
47	Abbey Hulton United (10)	2–3	Whitchurch Alport (9)	159
48	AFC Bridgnorth (10)	1–3	Wolverhampton Casuals (10)	36
49	Ellesmere Rangers (10)	0–4	Birstall United (10)	63
50	Rugby Borough (11)	3–2	Malvern Town (10)	106
51	Stafford Town (11)	2–3	Wednesfield (10)	40
52	Droitwich Spa (11)	2–4	Coventry United (9)	58
53	Boldmere St. Michaels (9)	4–1	GNP Sports (11)	113
54	Heather St. John's (10)	4–1	Rocester (10)	40
55	Rugby Town (9)	W.O.	Team Dudley (11)	-
Walkover for Rugby Town as Team Dudley were not accepted into the competition.
56	Racing Club Warwick (10)	10–0	Pegasus Juniors (10)	134
57	Melton Town (10)	2–2 (6–5 p)	Ingles (10)	128
The FA have insisted the tie to be replayed as it should not have been settled on penalties.
58	Lutterworth Athletic (10)	1–3	Cradley Town (10)	59
59	Wellington (10)	3–2	St. Martins (10)	50
60	Dudley Sports (10)	3–1	Shawbury United (10)	48
61	Coventry Copsewood (10)	6–3	Eccleshall (10)	25
63	Gornal Athletic (11)	1–2 (a.e.t.)	Stone Old Alleynians (10)	53
64	Wellington Amateurs (11)	W.O.	Ellistown (11)	-
Walkover for Wellington Amateurs as Ellistown were not accepted into the competition.
65	Heath Hayes (10)	3–1	Shifnal Town (10)	44
66	Dudley Town (10)	W.O.	Bardon Hill (11)	-
Walkover for Dudley Town as Bardon Hill resigned from the competition.
67	Pershore Town (10)	0–4	Hanley Town (9)	79
68	Ashby Ivanhoe (10)	2–0	Friar Lane & Epworth (11)	74
69	Bolehall Swifts (11)	3–0	Tipton Town (11)	52
70	Haughmond (10)	2–4	Saffron Dynamo (11)	56
71	Gedling Miners Welfare (10)	0–4	Ilkeston Town (9)	310
72	Rainworth Miners Welfare (10)	0–3	Teversal (10)	64
73	Newark Flowserve (10)	W.O.	Harrowby United (10)	-
Walkover for Harrowby United as Newark Flowserve were not accepted into the competition.
74	Leicester Road (10)	1–1	Bottesford Town (9)	35
75	Loughborough University (9)	6–0	West Bridgford (10)	78
76	Ollerton Town (10)	1–0	New Mills (10)	72
77	Skegness Town (10)	4–1	Clay Cross Town (11)	158
78	Anstey Nomads (10)	2–5	Eastwood Community (10)	236
79	Borrowash Victoria (10)	0–7	Hucknall Town (11)	78
80	Clifton All Whites (10)	4–4	Belper United (10)	54
81	Blidworth Welfare (11)	5–3	Blaby & Whetstone Athletic (11)	36
82	Clipstone (10)	1–2	Aylestone Park (10)	51
83	South Normanton Athletic (9)	3–0	St. Andrews (10)	41
84	Oadby Town (9)	1–7	Sherwood Colliery (10)	138
85	Dunkirk (9)	3–1 (a.e.t.)	Stapenhill (10)	46
86	Quorn (9)	5–0	Retford United (11)	142
87	Holwell Sports (10)	1–4	Pinxton (11)	82
88	Lincoln Moorlands Railway (11)	1–3	Kimberley Miners Welfare (10)	52
89	Radford (10)	1–3	Selston (10)	52
90	Framlingham Town (9)	3–2	Wisbech St. Mary (10)	70
91	Deeping Rangers (9)	7–1	Blackstones (10)	109
92	Woodbridge Town (9)	3–1	Eynesbury Rovers (9)	154
93	Gorleston (9)	5–1	Boston Town (9)	101
94	Peterborough Northern Star (9)	2–0	Fakenham Town (10)	30
96	Newmarket Town (9)	2–1	Downham Town (10)	67
97	Bourne Town (10)	3–4	March Town United (10)	78
98	Huntingdon Town (10)	0–4	Wroxham (9)	41
99	Ely City (9)	4–3 (a.e.t.)	Norwich United (9)	84
100	Stotfold (9)	4–0	Leyton Athletic (9)	34
102	Newbury Forest (10)	2–1	Wivenhoe Town (10)	30
104	Enfield Borough (10)	6–0	Halstead Town (10)	49
105	Clapton (9)	1–1	Woodford Town (9)	49
106	May & Baker (10)	8–1	Burnham Ramblers (10)	36
107	Stanway Rovers (9)	A–A	White Ensign (10)	50
Match abandoned after 84 minutes due to injury to a White Ensign player when the score was 2–1.
108	Baldock Town (9)	2–1	Long Melford (9)	66
109	Haverhill Rovers (9)	2–1	Ilford (9)	124
110	Holland (10)	4–2	Cornard United (10)	45
111	Walthamstow (9)	1–3 (a.e.t.)	Takeley (9)	85
112	Langford (10)	3–2	Tower Hamlets (9)	42
113	Southend Manor (9)	3–0	Ipswich Wanderers (10)	40
114	Stansted (9)	1–3	Brantham Athletic (9)	48
115	London Colney (9)	2–1	Cockfosters (9)	49

Tie	Home team (tier)	Score	Away team (tier)	Att.
116	Whitton United (9)	5–2	Hatfield Town (10)	55
117	British Airways (10)	1–3	Harefield United (10)	31
118	Rothwell Corinthians (9)	0–5	CB Hounslow United (9)	47
119	Spelthorne Sports (9)	5–3 (a.e.t.)	Northampton ON Chenecks (9)	72
120	FC Deportivo Galicia (10)	3–2	London Tigers (9)	18
121	Sandhurst Town (10)	1–2	Kensington Borough (10)	62
122	Wellingborough Whitworth (9)	0–2	Bugbrooke St. Michaels (10)	37
123	Hanworth Villa (9)	5–1	Bedford (10)	38
124	Ampthill Town (10)	1–3	Edgware Town (9)	47
125	Broadfields United (10)	5–0	Daventry Town (9)	23
126	AFC Hayes (9)	1–2	Wembley (9)	34
127	Rushden & Higham United (10)	4–5 (a.e.t.)	Winslow United (10)	54
128	Raunds Town (10)	2–1 (a.e.t.)	Cranfield United (11)	55
130	Southall (9)	3–2	Reading City (9)	36
131	Leverstock Green (9)	10–0	Unite MK (11)	37
132	Cricklewood Wanderers (11)	4–3	Risborough Rangers (10)	31
133	Burnham (10)	W.O.	Hillingdon (11)	-
Walkover for Burnham as Hillingdon were not accepted into the competition.
134	St. Panteleimon (11)	3–1	Holmer Green (9)	70
135	Shrivenham (9)	9–0	Tytherington Rocks (10)	34
136	Bashley (9)	6–0	AFC Portchester (9)	152
137	Binfield (9)	5–0	Frimley Green (10)	83
138	Tadley Calleva (9)	3–1	Ascot United (9)	95
139	Milton United (10)	0–3	Clanfield (10)	50
140	Chertsey Town (9)	4–2	Woodley United (10)	92
141	Brimscombe & Thrupp (9)	5–1	Ash United (10)	60
142	Wallingford Town (10)	1–4	Abingdon United (9)	48
143	Penn & Tylers Green (10)	1–3	AFC Stoneham (10)	37
144	Lydney Town (9)	1–3	Abbey Rangers (9)	82
145	Cove (10)	0–2	Fleet Spurs (10)	32
146	Royal Wootton Bassett Town (9)	W.O.	Oxford City Nomads (9)	-
Walkover for Royal Wootton Bassett Town as Oxford City Nomads were not accepted into the competition.
147	Ardley United (9)	1–4	Holyport (10)	45
148	Fairford Town (9)	2–3 (a.e.t.)	Baffins Milton Rovers (9)	25
149	Colliers Wood United (9)	3–1 (a.e.t.)	Stansfeld O&BC (10)	26
151	Raynes Park Vale (9)	0–1	Cobham (9)	38
153	Croydon (9)	2–3	Little Common (9)	44
154	Sutton Athletic (10)	1–2	Cray Valley Paper Mills (9)	60
155	Hassocks (9)	0–2	K Sports (9)	52
156	St. Francis Rangers (10)	3–1	FC Elmstead (10)	28
157	Knaphill (9)	1–4	AFC Varndeanians (10)	41
158	Wick (10)	2–1	Godalming Town (10)	44
159	Mile Oak (10)	2–2	Selsey (10)	34
160	Billingshurst (10)	0–3	Tunbridge Wells (9)	64
161	Lordswood (9)	2–0	Fire United (10)	45
163	Meridian Valley Park (10)	0–1	Southwick (10)	14
164	Chessington & Hook United (10)	7–0	Oakwood (10)	35
165	Erith Town (9)	5–0	Arundel (9)	40
166	Lewisham Borough (10)	1–2 (a.e.t.)	Broadbridge Heath (9)	103
167	Kent Football United (10)	2–3 (a.e.t.)	Steyning Town (10)	51
168	Sporting Club Thamesmead (10)	4–3	Midhurst & Easebourne (10)	55
170	AFC Croydon Athletic (9)	4–1	Worthing United (10)	61
171	AFC Uckfield Town (9)	2–0	Hollands & Blair (9)	51
172	Glebe (9)	3–0	Loxwood (9)	47
173	Seaford Town (10)	1–0	Tooting Bec (10)	51
174	Lydd Town (10)	1–2	Punjab United (9)	35
175	Snodland Town (10)	2–3	Newhaven (9)	98
177	Fisher (9)	4–4	Corinthian (9)	92
178	East Preston (9)	5–2	Eastbourne United (9)	81
179	Bearsted (9)	4–1	Bexhill United (10)	84
180	Sheppey United (9)	3–1	Balham (9)	233
181	Langney Wanderers (9)	0–2	Canterbury City (9)	67
182	Saltdean United (9)	2–1	Crawley Down Gatwick (9)	59
183	Redhill (9)	2–0	Holmesdale (10)	61
184	Guildford City (9)	4–0	Rochester United (10)	65
185	Whitchurch United (10)	0–2	Almondsbury (10)	72
186	Devizes Town (10)	0–2	Warminster Town (10)	102
187	Calne Town (10)	4–5	Fawley (10)	95
189	Cowes Sports (9)	3–5 (a.e.t.)	Westbury United (9)	131
191	Lymington Town (9)	4–2	Portland United (9)	61
192	Oldland Abbotonians (10)	2–3	Totton & Eling (10)	53
193	Hamworthy United (9)	5–0	Amesbury Town (10)	80
194	Romsey Town (10)	4–4	Bridport (9)	139
195	Ringwood Town (10)	1–2	Alresford Town (9)	55
196	Stockbridge (11)	1–3	Roman Glass St. George (9)	40
197	Hallen (9)	2–3	Fareham Town (9)	48
198	East Cowes Victoria Athletic (10)	4–3	Pewsey Vale (10)	25
199	Team Solent (9)	2–3	Longwell Green Sports (10)	27
200	Eversley & California (10)	1–0	Downton (10)	46
201	Bournemouth (9)	8–0	Bristol Telephones (10)	51
202	Hythe & Dibden (10)	1–2 (a.e.t.)	Bemerton Heath Harlequins (9)	65
203	Corsham Town (10)	1–0	Laverstock & Ford (10)	61
204	Exmouth Town (10)	4–2	Callington Town (10)	137
205	Plymouth Parkway (9)	5–1	Brislington (9)	124
206	Tavistock (10)	3–1	Helston Athletic (10)	65
207	Keynsham Town (10)	2–3	Sidmouth Town (11)	112
208	Bishops Lydeard (10)	3–0 (a.e.t.)	Bishop Sutton (10)	37
209	Godolphin Atlantic (10)	1–0	Portishead Town (10)	59
210	Hengrove Athletic (9)	1–2 (a.e.t.)	Newquay (10)	90
211	Wellington AFC (9)	1–3	Saltash United (10)	45
212	Liskeard Athletic (11)	1–3	Bovey Tracey (11)	73
213	Crediton United (11)	0–3	Clevedon Town (9)	131
214	AFC St. Austell (10)	3–1	Ilfracombe Town (11)	198
215	Wincanton Town (10)	1–2	Radstock Town (10)	79
216	Witheridge (10)	W.O.	Wells City (10)	-
Walkover for Wells City as Witheridge withdrew from the competition.
217	Odd Down (9)	4–1	Shepton Mallet (9)	56
218	Elburton Villa (10)	3–1	Launceston (10)	49
Sunday 2 September 2018
46	FC Stratford (11)	0–1	Bewdley Town (10)	105
62	NKF Burbage (10)	2–1	Lutterworth Town (10)	202
101	St. Margaretsbury (9)	0–3	Hadleigh United (9)	84
129	Bicester Town (10)	3–2	AFC Spelthorne Sports Club (11)	37
162	Sheerwater (10)	2–1	Lancing (9)	99
169	Westside (11)	2–4	AC London (10)	50
176	Erith & Belvedere (10)	1–3	Rusthall (9)	37
190	Chippenham Park (10)	0–4	Bitton (9)	61
Tuesday 4 September 2018
103	Wormley Rovers (10)	1–2 (a.e.t.)	Biggleswade United (9)	59
Match played at Biggleswade United.
107	Stanway Rovers (9)	4–2	White Ensign (10)	60
Replays
Tuesday 4 September 2018
10R	Newton Aycliffe (9)	0–2	Bishop Auckland (9)	220
45R	Sporting Khalsa (9)	3–0	Coventry Sphinx (9)	121
80R	Belper United (10)	3–0	Clifton All Whites (10)	59
105R	Woodford Town (9)	1–3	Clapton (9)	71
159R	Selsey (10)	3–0	Mile Oak (10)	107
177R	Corinthian (9)	3–2	Fisher (9)	63
Wednesday 5 September 2018
22R	Willington (10)	2–3	Northallerton Town (10)	125
74R	Bottesford Town (9)	2–1	Leicester Road (10)	55
194R	Bridport (9)	4–2	Romsey Town (10)	131
Wednesday 12 September 2018
57R	Ingles (10)	1–0	Melton Town (10)	228

== Second round qualifying ==
Tie	Home team (tier)	Score	Away team (tier)	Att.
Friday 14 September 2018
13	Hebburn Town (9)	3–1	Billingham Synthonia (10)	310
132	Longlevens (9)	0–0	Tuffley Rovers (9)	184
Saturday 15 September 2018
1	Northallerton Town (10)	1–2	Steeton (10)	119
2	Ashington (9)	6–2	Crook Town (10)	111
3	Nelson (10)	5–2	Tow Law Town (10)	57
4	Thackley (9)	5–2	Carlisle City (10)	47
5	Whickham (9)	2–1 (a.e.t.)	Whitley Bay (9)	215
6	Billingham Town (10)	3–1	Birtley Town (10)	206
8	Ryhope Colliery Welfare (9)	0–2	Dunston UTS (9)	104
9	Bishop Auckland (9)	3–1 (a.e.t.)	West Allotment Celtic (10)	231
10	Brandon United (10)	3–2 (a.e.t.)	Washington (10)	62
11	Penrith (9)	1–4	Charnock Richard (9)	123
12	Padiham (9)	2–2	Prestwich Heys (10)	129
14	Ryton & Crawcrook Albion (10)	1–2	Garforth Town (9)	49
15	Guisborough Town (9)	4–2	Barnoldswick Town (9)	177
16	Bedlington Terriers (10)	2–0	Redcar Athletic (10)	70
17	Bridlington Town (9)	1–0 (a.e.t.)	Consett (9)	329
18	Daisy Hill (10)	0–2	Seaham Red Star (9)	54
19	AFC Darwen (10)	1–2	Garstang (10)	99
21	Swallownest (10)	4–1	AFC Blackpool (10)	81
22	Avro (10)	3–0	Barnton (10)	74
23	Irlam (9)	4–2	Burscough (9)	72
24	Bacup Borough (10)	1–4	Litherland REMYCA (9)	47
25	Cammell Laird 1907 (10)	2–1	Shelley (10)	63
26	Glasshoughton Welfare (10)	3–1	Parkgate (10)	82
27	Cheadle Town (10)	2–2	Vauxhall Motors (10)	60
28	Bootle (9)	0–1	Hallam (10)	111
30	Staveley Miners Welfare (9)	4–1	Maine Road (10)	227
31	Wythenshawe Town (10) or Rylands (10)	W.O.	Hemsworth Miners Welfare (9)	-
Walkover for Hemsworth Miners Welfare as both Wythenshawe Town and Rylands were not accepted into the competition.
32	Barton Town (9)	4–0	Ashton Town (10)	145
33	Atherton Laburnum Rovers (10)	0–4	Sandbach United (10)	62
34	Winsford United (9)	5–0	Worksop Town (9)	150
35	Winterton Rangers (10)	2–0	Rossington Main (10)	72
36	Lower Breck (10)	1–0	Stockport Town (10)	74
37	Chelmsley Town (10)	3–1	Tividale (10)	80
38	Dudley Sports (10)	0–4	Hanley Town (9)	26
39	Rugby Borough (11)	0–2	Bustleholme (11)	50
40	Whitchurch Alport (9)	2–3 (a.e.t.)	Shepshed Dynamo (9)	182
41	Littleton (10)	0–1	Smethwick (10)	50
42	Birstall United (10)	0–4	Heather St. John's (10)	74
43	Coventry Copsewood (10)	1–2	Hereford Lads Club (10)	65
44	Boldmere St. Michaels (9)	3–0	Studley (10)	89
45	Lye Town (9)	2–0	Bolehall Swifts (11)	65
46	Wednesfield (10)	5–2	Bromyard Town (11)	95
47	Uttoxeter Town (10)	2–2	Walsall Wood (9)	84
48	Wellington Amateurs (11)	6–3	Racing Club Warwick (10)	77
50	Brocton (10)	4–0	Nuneaton Griff (10)	63
51	Cadbury Athletic (10)	2–0	Wem Town (10)	42
52	Coventry United (9)	2–1	Atherstone Town (10)	176
53	Paget Rangers (10)	W.O.	Kington Town (11)	-
Walkover for Paget Rangers as Kington Town were removed from the competition.
54	Saffron Dynamo (11)	4–0	Heath Hayes (10)	72
55	Ingles (10)	0–2	Rugby Town (9)	133
56	Ashby Ivanhoe (10)	0–1	Bewdley Town (10)	77
57	Black Country Rangers (10)	4–0	Dudley Town (10)	57
58	Wolverhampton Casuals (10)	0–1	Romulus (9)	55
59	AFC Wulfrunians (9)	1–2	Wellington (10)	70
60	Stone Old Alleynians (10)	3–7	Sporting Khalsa (9)	47
61	Hucknall Town (11)	2–0	Harrowby United (10)	144
62	Aylestone Park (10)	2–1	Kimberley Miners Welfare (10)	60
63	Pinxton (11)	1–1	Bottesford Town (9)	151
64	Holbrook Sports (11)	3–5	Blidworth Welfare (11)	25
66	Quorn (9)	4–1	Skegness Town (10)	122
67	Barrow Town (10)	4–1	Shirebrook Town (10)	64
68	Heanor Town (10)	3–2	Dunkirk (9)	107
69	South Normanton Athletic (9)	1–3	Selston (10)	114
70	Ollerton Town (10)	1–5 (a.e.t.)	Long Eaton United (9)	94
71	Arnold Town (10)	0–5	Loughborough University (9)	41
72	Sleaford Town (9)	2–0	Sandiacre Town (11)	80
73	Eastwood Community (10)	3–2	Sherwood Colliery (10)	98
74	Graham Street Prims (10)	0–2	Ilkeston Town (9)	308
75	Dronfield Town (10)	3–1	Harborough Town (9)	75
76	FC Bolsover (10)	1–2	Leicester Nirvana (9)	40
77	Peterborough Northern Star (9)	1–0	March Town United (10)	48
78	Histon (9)	W.O.	Team Bury (10)	-
Walkover for Histon as Team Bury folded before the start of the season.
79	Walsham-le-Willows (9)	1–4	Deeping Rangers (9)	63
80	Wroxham (9)	3–0	Mulbarton Wanderers (10)	132
81	Framlingham Town (9)	0–0	Swaffham Town (10)	73
82	Woodbridge Town (9)	2–1	Pinchbeck United (9)	152
83	Great Yarmouth Town (9)	3–1	Thetford Town (9)	66
84	Gorleston (9)	0–2	Kirkley & Pakefield (9)	118
85	Newmarket Town (9)	5–2	Ely City (9)	82
86	Saffron Walden Town (9)	1–4	May & Baker (10)	170
87	Southend Manor (9)	4–3	Haverhill Rovers (9)	44
88	Hoddesdon Town (9)	2–3	FC Clacton (9)	101
89	London Lions (10)	0–3	Biggleswade United (9)	47
90	Colney Heath (9)	2–1	Langford (10)	77
91	Brantham Athletic (9)	3–4	Takeley (9)	62
92	Haverhill Borough (10)	2–1	Whitton United (9)	52
93	Little Oakley (10)	1–0	Hadleigh United (9)	115
94	Barkingside (9)	1–1 (2–4 p)	Wodson Park (10)	62
95	London Colney (9)	3–1	FC Broxbourne Borough (10)	40
99	Codicote (10)	1–0	Holland (10)	54
100	Clapton (9)	0–2	Newbury Forest (10)	45
101	Hadley (9)	0–1	Enfield (9)	32
102	Stotfold (9)	2–4	West Essex (9)	45
103	Amersham Town (10)	0–1	Hanworth Villa (9)	49
104	Southall (9)	5–0	Wembley (9)	42
105	Brackley Town Saints (9)	0–1	Crawley Green (9)	42
107	Brimsdown (10)	W.O.	Bicester Town (10)	-
Walkover for Brimsdown as Bicester Town withdrew from the competition.

Tie	Home team (tier)	Score	Away team (tier)	Att.
108	Leverstock Green (9)	4–0	Raunds Town (10)	34
109	Wellingborough Town (9)	3–2	Burnham (10)	89
110	Potton United (9)	2–3	CB Hounslow United (9)	64
111	St. Panteleimon (11)	4–1	Long Buckby (10)	47
112	Cricklewood Wanderers (11)	3–6 (a.e.t.)	North Greenford United (9)	38
113	Arlesey Town (9)	1–2 (a.e.t.)	Irchester United (10)	96
114	Kensington Borough (10)	4–2	Northampton Sileby Rangers (10)	32
116	Bedfont & Feltham (10)	2–0	Winslow United (10)	58
117	Bugbrooke St. Michaels (10)	3–3	Spelthorne Sports (9)	37
118	Rayners Lane (10)	3–2	Thrapston Town (10)	44
119	Harefield United (10)	4–1	Oxhey Jets (9)	62
120	Easington Sports (10)	1–2	Brimscombe & Thrupp (9)	56
121	Baffins Milton Rovers (9)	14–1	New College Swindon (10)	88
122	Royal Wootton Bassett Town (9)	0–4	Bashley (9)	52
124	Tadley Calleva (9)	0–1	Chertsey Town (9)	148
125	Abingdon United (9)	3–0	Alton (10)	46
126	AFC Stoneham (10)	3–2	Binfield (9)	89
127	Chipping Sodbury Town (9)	1–3	Abbey Rangers (9)	50
128	Clanfield (10)	2–5	Buckingham Athletic (10)	32
129	Shrivenham (9)	1–4	Badshot Lea (9)	47
130	Malmesbury Victoria (10)	3–1	Virginia Water (9)	110
131	Cheltenham Saracens (10)	0–1	Flackwell Heath (9)	40
133	Holyport (10)	2–1	Fleet Spurs (10)	32
134	Redhill (9)	2–1	Forest Hill Park (10)	60
135	Steyning Town (10)	1–1 (9–8 p)	Punjab United (9)	130
136	AFC Varndeanians (10)	0–2	Canterbury City (9)	43
138	Cobham (9)	W.O.	Gravesham Borough (10)	-
Walkover for Cobham as Gravesham Borough folded before the start of the season.
139	St. Francis Rangers (10)	0–6	Lordswood (9)	27
140	Sporting Club Thamesmead (10)	0–1	Banstead Athletic (9)	47
141	Tunbridge Wells (9)	1–1	Bridon Ropes (10)	181
142	Guildford City (9)	0–2	Rusthall (9)	50
143	Wick (10)	4–2	Hackney Wick (10)	38
144	Peacehaven & Telscombe (9)	3–1	Shoreham (9)	140
145	AFC Uckfield Town (9)	5–0	Southwick (10)	67
146	AC London (10)	2–3	Erith Town (9)	26
147	Colliers Wood United (9)	0–1	Sidlesham (10)	34
148	Saltdean United (9)	3–1	Littlehampton Town (10)	47
149	Selsey (10)	0–2	Bearsted (9)	125
150	Chatham Town (9)	5–1	Camberley Town (9)	136
151	Corinthian (9)	3–0	Glebe (9)	38
152	Chessington & Hook United (10)	0–5	Sheerwater (10)	38
153	Newhaven (9)	1–0	Little Common (9)	84
154	Sheppey United (9)	5–3	Seaford Town (10)	204
155	K Sports (9)	1–4	Deal Town (9)	54
156	East Preston (9)	1–0	Broadbridge Heath (9)	51
157	AFC Croydon Athletic (9)	5–2 (a.e.t.)	Lingfield (9)	65
158	Hamworthy United (9)	3–1	Fawley (10)	82
159	Roman Glass St. George (9)	3–0	Bemerton Heath Harlequins (9)	60
160	Bournemouth (9)	3–1	Christchurch (9)	85
161	Verwood Town (10)	1–1	Alresford Town (9)	39
162	Bridport (9)	5–0	Warminster Town (10)	145
163	Eversley & California (10)	2–1	Lymington Town (9)	39
164	Shortwood United (9)	1–5	Cribbs (9)	97
165	Swanage Town & Herston (11)	0–3	Longwell Green Sports (10)	67
166	Fareham Town (9)	2–1 (a.e.t.)	Corsham Town (10)	104
167	Bitton (9)	3–1	Bishop's Cleeve (9)	45
168	Petersfield Town (10)	1–3	Westbury United (9)	70
169	New Milton Town (10)	1–2	Cadbury Heath (9)	80
170	Totton & Eling (10)	1–0	East Cowes Victoria Athletic (10)	32
171	Sherborne Town (10)	0–1	Almondsbury (10)	86
172	Shaftesbury (9)	5–1	Andover New Street (9)	56
173	United Services Portsmouth (10)	0–2	Brockenhurst (9)	42
174	Buckland Athletic (9)	0–1	Newquay (10)	103
175	Odd Down (9)	2–1	Welton Rovers (10)	104
176	Radstock Town (10)	1–3	Plymouth Parkway (9)	72
177	Cullompton Rangers (10)	0–4	Ivybridge Town (10)	73
178	Sidmouth Town (11)	4–1	Godolphin Atlantic (10)	108
179	Saltash United (10)	6–0	Axminster Town (11)	84
180	Bovey Tracey (11)	1–2 (a.e.t.)	Tavistock (10)	93
181	Falmouth Town (10)	2–1	Clevedon Town (9)	166
182	Bishops Lydeard (10)	0–4	Elburton Villa (10)	55
183	Exmouth Town (10)	3–0	Bridgwater Town (9)	185
184	Cheddar (10)	2–0	Newton Abbot Spurs (11)	51
185	Camelford (10)	3–3	Bodmin Town (10)	69
186	Porthleven (11)	3–6	Torpoint Athletic (10)	76
187	Wells City (10)	2–3	AFC St. Austell (10)	92
Sunday 16 September 2018
7	Albion Sports (9)	0–1	Silsden (9)	144
20	Northwich Victoria (9)	2–0	Maltby Main (9)	124
29	Worsbrough Bridge Athletic (10)	0–2	Squires Gate (9)	102
49	NKF Burbage (10)	2–1	Cradley Town (10)	158
65	Belper United (10)	1–0	Teversal (10)	121
96	Coggeshall United (10)	0–4	Sawbridgworth Town (9)	115
97	Enfield Borough (10)	3–2	Sporting Bengal United (9)	61
98	Baldock Town (9)	1–0	Stanway Rovers (9)	95
106	Burton Park Wanderers (10)	0–5	FC Deportivo Galicia (10)	51
115	Broadfields United (10)	2–0 (a.e.t.)	Edgware Town (9)	62
123	Thame Rangers (10)	1–0	Farnham Town (10)	85
137	Cray Valley Paper Mills (9)	2–0	Hailsham Town (10)	106
Replays
Tuesday 18 September 2018
12R	Prestwich Heys (10)	6–2	Padiham (9)	89
27R	Vauxhall Motors (10)	6–0	Cheadle Town (10)	67
47R	Walsall Wood (9)	5–4 (a.e.t.)	Uttoxeter Town (10)	80
81R	Swaffham Town (10)	2–1	Framlingham Town (9)	69
117R	Spelthorne Sports (9)	2–0	Bugbrooke St. Michaels (10)	89
132R	Tuffley Rovers (9)	0–1	Longlevens (9)	137
161R	Alresford Town (9)	1–0	Verwood Town (10)	50
Wednesday 19 September 2018
63R	Bottesford Town (9)	3–0	Pinxton (11)	94
141R	Bridon Ropes (10)	0–1	Tunbridge Wells (9)	101
185R	Bodmin Town (10)	4–0	Camelford (10)	95

== First round proper ==
Tie	Home team (tier)	Score	Away team (tier)	Att.
Friday 12 October 2018
70	Southall (9)	6–0	Sheerwater (10)	79
Saturday 13 October 2018
1	Hallam (10)	3–1	Charnock Richard (9)	403
2	Northwich Victoria (9)	5–0	Cammell Laird 1907 (10)	172
3	Litherland REMYCA (9)	1–4	Thackley (9)	78
4	Prestwich Heys (10)	6–2	Garforth Town (9)	88
5	Irlam (9)	2–0	Handsworth Parramore (9)	88
6	Staveley Miners Welfare (9)	2–2	Silsden (9)	271
7	Bedlington Terriers (10)	5–1	Whickham (9)	117
8	Sunderland RCA (9)	3–2 (a.e.t.)	Bridlington Town (9)	153
9	Hebburn Town (9)	4–0	City of Liverpool (9)	1,302
10	Vauxhall Motors (10)	4–0	Seaham Red Star (9)	86
11	Squires Gate (9)	2–1	Sandbach United (10)	57
12	Bishop Auckland (9)	2–3	Hemsworth Miners Welfare (9)	327
13	Swallownest (10)	1–1 (3–4 p)	Garstang (10)	164
14	Steeton (10)	2–3	Avro (10)	174
15	Runcorn Town (9)	3–3	Guisborough Town (9)	133
16	Billingham Town (10)	1–3	Dunston UTS (9)	240
17	Winterton Rangers (10)	1–0	Lower Breck (10)	94
18	Nelson (10)	P–P	Ashington (9)	-
19	Shildon (9)	1–0	Glasshoughton Welfare (10)	181
20	Barton Town (9)	8–0	Brandon United (10)	187
21	Shepshed Dynamo (9)	2–0	Bewdley Town (10)	178
22	Cadbury Athletic (10)	4–0	Hanley Town (9)	60
23	Aylestone Park (10)	0–3	Blidworth Welfare (11)	55
24	Lye Town (9)	5–2	Chelmsley Town (10)	96
25	Romulus (9)	3–3	Wellington (10)	60
26	Bustleholme (11)	1–4	NKF Burbage (10)	105
28	Loughborough University (9)	1–2	Heather St. John's (10)	213
29	Wellington Amateurs (11)	1–2	Leicester Nirvana (9)	81
31	Brocton (10)	3–2 (a.e.t.)	Highgate United (9)	69
32	Heanor Town (10)	0–3	Ilkeston Town (9)	931
33	Sporting Khalsa (9)	1–0	Winsford United (9)	127
34	Saffron Dynamo (11)	3–3	Bottesford Town (9)	106
35	Barrow Town (10)	0–1	Dronfield Town (10)	114
36	Hereford Lads Club (10)	2–0	Paget Rangers (10)	73
37	Eastwood Community (10)	3–0	Selston (10)	293
38	Boldmere St. Michaels (9)	2–1	Rugby Town (9)	200
39	Hucknall Town (11)	3–2	Black Country Rangers (10)	181
40	Worcester City (9)	2–1	Long Eaton United (9)	424
41	Smethwick (10)	0–3	Walsall Wood (9)	55
42	Baldock Town (9)	3–0	Brimsdown (10)	74
43	Little Oakley (10)	2–2	Enfield (9)	217
44	Newmarket Town (9)	0–1	Deeping Rangers (9)	102
45	Great Yarmouth Town (9)	3–1	Wroxham (9)	228
46	Colney Heath (9)	1–1	Histon (9)	122
48	Buckingham Athletic (10)	2–2	FC Clacton (9)	75
49	Newbury Forest (10)	2–3	Newport Pagnell Town (9)	55
50	Biggleswade United (9)	2–3 (a.e.t.)	Holbeach United (9)	82
51	Haverhill Borough (10)	3–4	Swaffham Town (10)	44
53	London Colney (9)	2–3 (a.e.t.)	Wellingborough Town (9)	40
54	Southend Manor (9)	1–4	Redbridge (9)	24
55	May & Baker (10)	4–2 (a.e.t.)	North Greenford United (9)	41
56	Thame Rangers (10)	4–2	Crawley Green (9)	40
58	Takeley (9)	0–2	Wodson Park (10)	93
59	Codicote (10)	1–7	Wantage Town (9)	69
60	Harefield United (10)	0–2	Woodbridge Town (9)	90
61	Stowmarket Town (9)	5–0	Harpenden Town (9)	231
62	Sleaford Town (9)	2–2	Peterborough Northern Star (9)	75
63	Leverstock Green (9)	3–0	Sawbridgworth Town (9)	67
64	Sidlesham (10)	0–2	Chatham Town (9)	69
65	Redhill (9)	2–3	Peacehaven & Telscombe (9)	69

Tie	Home team (tier)	Score	Away team (tier)	Att.
66	Sheppey United (9)	4–0	East Preston (9)	279
67	Wick (10)	0–3	Lordswood (9)	28
68	Corinthian (9)	3–2	Deal Town (9)	66
69	Eversley & California (10)	0–1	Horndean (9)	93
71	Spelthorne Sports (9)	2–1	CB Hounslow United (9)	73
72	Rayners Lane (10)	2–3	Abbey Rangers (9)	56
73	Bearsted (9)	3–0	Beckenham Town (9)	147
76	Hanworth Villa (9)	2–4	Pagham (9)	66
77	Sutton Common Rovers (9)	2–1	Cobham (9)	75
78	Chertsey Town (9)	6–1	Flackwell Heath (9)	167
79	AFC Croydon Athletic (9)	3–0	Fareham Town (9)	96
80	Horsham YMCA (9)	0–2	Kensington Borough (10)	110
81	St. Panteleimon (11)	A–A	Cray Valley Paper Mills (9)	50
Match abandoned after 104 minutes due to injury to a St. Panteleimon player when the score was 1–1.
82	Bedfont & Feltham (10)	1–2	Erith Town (9)	78
83	Newhaven (9)	2–1	Rusthall (9)	98
84	Tunbridge Wells (9)	0–2	AFC Uckfield Town (9)	192
85	Steyning Town (10)	1–0	Walton & Hersham (9)	278
86	Bashley (9)	1–2	Baffins Milton Rovers (9)	190
87	Saltash United (10)	2–1	Westbury United (9)	105
88	Brimscombe & Thrupp (9)	2–3	Cribbs (9)	91
89	Longwell Green Sports (10)	1–3	Brockenhurst (9)	68
90	Ivybridge Town (10)	0–0	Holyport (10)	165
91	Torpoint Athletic (10)	0–1	Sholing (9)	116
92	Exmouth Town (10)	2–0	Elburton Villa (10)	128
93	Cheddar (10)	1–0 (a.e.t.)	Totton & Eling (10)	79
94	Roman Glass St. George (9)	0–2	Malmesbury Victoria (10)	59
95	Andover Town (10)	1–4	Badshot Lea (9)	117
96	Odd Down (9)	1–4	Willand Rovers (9)	56
97	Alresford Town (9)	1–0	Abingdon United (9)	190
98	Bridport (9)	0–6	Falmouth Town (10)	179
99	Bodmin Town (10)	2–1	AFC Stoneham (10)	105
100	Bournemouth (9)	6–0	Newquay (10)	72
101	Longlevens (9)	1–3 (a.e.t.)	Tavistock (10)	89
102	Cadbury Heath (9)	5–0	Sidmouth Town (11)	71
103	AFC St. Austell (10)	6–1	Plymouth Parkway (9)	311
104	Almondsbury (10)	2–1	Bitton (9)	56
105	Shaftesbury (9)	1–2	Hamworthy United (9)	125
Sunday 14 October 2018
27	Coventry United (9)	5–0	Wednesfield (10)	109
30	Belper United (10)	1–4	Quorn (9)	117
47	FC Deportivo Galicia (10)	1–2	Irchester United (10)	28
52	Enfield Borough (10)	2–3 (a.e.t.)	Kirkley & Pakefield (9)	26
57	West Essex (9)	1–2	Godmanchester Rovers (9)	75
74	Canterbury City (9)	2–1	Saltdean United (9)	97
75	Broadfields United (10)	1–7	Banstead Athletic (9)	45
Tuesday 16 October 2018
18	Nelson (10)	0–5	Ashington (9)	69
Wednesday 17 October 2018
81	St. Panteleimon (11)	1–3	Cray Valley Paper Mills (9)	56
Replays
Tuesday 16 October 2018
6R	Silsden (9)	2–0	Staveley Miners Welfare (9)	179
25R	Wellington (10)	1–3	Romulus (9)	89
43R	Enfield (9)	2–0 (a.e.t.)	Little Oakley (10)	60
46R	Histon (9)	2–0	Colney Heath (9)	129
48R	FC Clacton (9)	3–2	Buckingham Athletic (10)	83
62R	Peterborough Northern Star (9)	2–0	Sleaford Town (9)	50
90R	Holyport (10)	0–3	Ivybridge Town (10)	92
Wednesday 17 October 2018
15R	Guisborough Town (9)	2–4 (a.e.t.)	Runcorn Town (9)	244
34R	Bottesford Town (9)	2–3	Saffron Dynamo (11)	85

== Second round proper ==
Tie	Home team (tier)	Score	Away team (tier)	Att.
Friday 2 November 2018
2	Vauxhall Motors (10)	1–3	Runcorn Town (9)	297
36	Histon (9)	5–4	Woodbridge Town (9)	174
41	Sutton Common Rovers (9)	6–1	Horley Town (9)	63
Saturday 3 November 2018
1	Hallam (10)	1–2	Hebburn Town (9)	261
3	Silsden (9)	3–1	Bedlington Terriers (10)	151
4	Newcastle Benfield (9)	2–0	1874 Northwich (9)	262
5	Avro (10)	2–1	Squires Gate (9)	110
6	Winterton Rangers (10)	2–1	Dunston UTS (9)	162
7	Irlam (9)	3–1	Hemsworth Miners Welfare (9)	141
8	Barton Town (9)	0–2	Shildon (9)	307
9	Garstang (10)	2–6	Sunderland RCA (9)	198
10	Thackley (9)	0–1	West Auckland Town (9)	148
11	Stockton Town (9)	4–1	Ashington (9)	343
12	Prestwich Heys (10)	0–0	Northwich Victoria (9)	182
13	Westfields (9)	3–2	Romulus (9)	108
14	Shepshed Dynamo (9)	3–0	Blidworth Welfare (11)	159
16	Cadbury Athletic (10)	3–2	Heather St. John's (10)	70
17	Coventry United (9)	3–0	Boldmere St. Michaels (9)	105
18	Sporting Khalsa (9)	3–2	Hucknall Town (11)	145
19	Quorn (9)	1–2	Eastwood Community (10)	165
20	Wolverhampton Sporting (9)	0–2	Ilkeston Town (9)	124
21	Walsall Wood (9)	3–1	Dronfield Town (10)	81
22	Lye Town (9)	4–1	Brocton (10)	92
23	Stourport Swifts (9)	0–2	NKF Burbage (10)	98
24	Hinckley (10)	3–1	Hereford Lads Club (10)	156
25	Leicester Nirvana (9)	3–0	Saffron Dynamo (11)	73
26	Biggleswade (9)	3–1	Norwich CBS (10)	85
27	Cogenhoe United (9)	2–0	Leighton Town (9)	83
Cogenhoe United removed for use of ineligible player. Leighton Town reinstated.
28	FC Clacton (9)	1–0	Kirkley & Pakefield (9)	116
29	Great Yarmouth Town (9)	1–3	Godmanchester Rovers (9)	112
31	Redbridge (9)	1–0	Peterborough Northern Star (9)	62
32	Hullbridge Sports (9)	3–1	Irchester United (10)	89
33	Wellingborough Town (9)	0–7	Tring Athletic (9)	126
35	Stowmarket Town (9)	3–1 (a.e.t.)	Baldock Town (9)	234
37	Wantage Town (9)	1–2	Deeping Rangers (9)	89

Tie	Home team (tier)	Score	Away team (tier)	Att.
38	Wodson Park (10)	0–2	Holbeach United (9)	63
39	Newport Pagnell Town (9)	3–2	Thame Rangers (10)	139
40	Chertsey Town (9)	2–0	Horndean (9)	169
42	Abbey Rangers (9)	5–0	Lordswood (9)	49
43	Chichester City (9)	0–2	Windsor (9)	140
45	Steyning Town (10)	1–0	Banstead Athletic (9)	289
46	AFC Croydon Athletic (9)	1–2	AFC Uckfield Town (9)	85
47	Spelthorne Sports (9)	1–2	Sheppey United (9)	95
49	Crowborough Athletic (9)	0–4	Eastbourne Town (9)	251
50	Corinthian (9)	2–4 (a.e.t.)	Canterbury City (9)	62
51	Pagham (9)	4–1	Peacehaven & Telscombe (9)	108
52	Bearsted (9)	1–0	Newhaven (9)	135
53	Southall (9)	1–0 (a.e.t.)	Chatham Town (9)	41
54	Sholing (9)	5–1	Malmesbury Victoria (10)	185
55	Exmouth Town (10)	3–4	Cadbury Heath (9)	124
56	Almondsbury (10)	1–2	Hamble Club (9)	60
57	Bodmin Town (10)	1–0 (a.e.t.)	Alresford Town (9)	102
58	Cheddar (10)	1–2	AFC St. Austell (10)	171
59	Newport (IoW) (10)	0–2	Cribbs (9)	155
60	Baffins Milton Rovers (9)	3–2	Bournemouth (9)	130
61	Brockenhurst (9)	0–4	Bradford Town (9)	138
62	Willand Rovers (9)	2–1	Tavistock (10)	176
63	Ivybridge Town (10)	1–3	Saltash United (10)	89
64	Hamworthy United (9)	3–1 (a.e.t.)	Falmouth Town (10)	137
Sunday 4 November 2018
15	Worcester City (9)	0–2	Desborough Town (9)	365
30	Enfield (9)	P–P	Leverstock Green (9)	-
34	May & Baker (10)	0–1	Swaffham Town (10)	162
44	Kensington Borough (10)	0–3	Erith Town (9)	26
48	Badshot Lea (9)	0–7	Cray Valley Paper Mills (9)	54
Tuesday 13 November 2018
30	Enfield (9)	1–4	Leverstock Green (9)	66
Replays
Wednesday 7 November 2018
12R	Northwich Victoria (9)	1–0	Prestwich Heys (10)	102

== Third round proper ==
Tie	Home team (tier)	Score	Away team (tier)	Att.
Saturday 1 December 2018
1	Shildon (9)	2–3	Sunderland RCA (9)	212
2	Northwich Victoria (9)	3–0	Silsden (9)	174
3	Stockton Town (9)	3–5	Hebburn Town (9)	427
4	Avro (10)	0–2	West Auckland Town (9)	180
5	Irlam (9)	A–A	Winterton Rangers (10)	100
Match abandoned at half time due to floodlight failure when the score was 0-0.
6	Newcastle Benfield (9)	5–4	Runcorn Town (9)	153
7	Ilkeston Town (9)	1–2	Eastwood Community (10)	908
8	Coventry United (9)	4–0	Hinckley (10)	145
9	Cadbury Athletic (10)	3–2	Desborough Town (9)	91
10	Westfields (9)	0–4	Leicester Nirvana (9)	128
11	Shepshed Dynamo (9)	3–0	NKF Burbage (10)	241
12	Lye Town (9)	4–0 (a.e.t.)	Leighton Town (9)	145
13	Sporting Khalsa (9)	3–1	Walsall Wood (9)	145
15	Godmanchester Rovers (9)	2–0	Holbeach United (9)	136
16	Swaffham Town (10)	0–0	Stowmarket Town (9)	325
17	Tring Athletic (9)	1–1	Biggleswade (9)	239
18	Hullbridge Sports (9)	P–P	Newport Pagnell Town (9)	-
19	Deeping Rangers (9)	4–2	FC Clacton (9)	129
20	AFC Uckfield Town (9)	P–P	Sutton Common Rovers (9)	-
21	Eastbourne Town (9)	0–1	Abbey Rangers (9)	183
22	Redbridge (9)	P–P	Chertsey Town (9)	-
23	Bearsted (9)	3–2 (a.e.t.)	Steyning Town (10)	181
24	Sheppey United (9)	0–4	Cray Valley Paper Mills (9)	202

Tie	Home team (tier)	Score	Away team (tier)	Att.
25	Canterbury City (9)	1–0 (a.e.t.)	Southall (9)	80
26	Erith Town (9)	1–2	Windsor (9)	183
27	Saltash United (10)	P–P	Cribbs (9)	-
28	Bradford Town (9)	1–3	Baffins Milton Rovers (9)	158
29	Willand Rovers (9)	3–0	Bodmin Town (10)	187
30	Cadbury Heath (9)	P–P	AFC St. Austell (10)	-
31	Hamble Club (9)	1–1	Hamworthy United (9)	85
32	Sholing (9)	6–2	Pagham (9)	144
Sunday 2 December 2018
14	Histon (9)	5–1	Leverstock Green (9)	212
Saturday 8 December 2018
5	Irlam (9)	2–0	Winterton Rangers (10)	120
Match played at Winterton Rangers.
18	Hullbridge Sports (9)	0–2	Newport Pagnell Town (9)	61
20	AFC Uckfield Town (9)	5–2	Sutton Common Rovers (9)	38
22	Redbridge (9)	0–5	Chertsey Town (9)	68
27	Saltash United (10)	2–4	Cribbs (9)	135
30	Cadbury Heath (9)	4–8	AFC St. Austell (10)	146
Replays
Tuesday 4 December 2018
16R	Stowmarket Town (9)	2–1	Swaffham Town (10)	363
31R	Hamworthy United (9)	4–1	Hamble Club (9)	110
Saturday 8 December 2018
17R	Biggleswade (9)	0–0 (5–3 p)	Tring Athletic (9)	138

== Fourth round proper ==
Tie	Home team (tier)	Score	Away team (tier)	Att.
Saturday 5 January 2019
1	Godmanchester Rovers (9)	1–0	Sporting Khalsa (9)	252
Match awarded to Sporting Khalsa as Godmanchester Rovers fielded an ineligible player.
2	Irlam (9)	4–0	Cadbury Athletic (10)	320
3	Hebburn Town (9)	2–1	Shepshed Dynamo (9)	795
4	Newcastle Benfield (9)	2–3	Northwich Victoria (9)	360
5	Sunderland RCA (9)	0–1 (a.e.t.)	West Auckland Town (9)	264
6	Coventry United (9)	3–2	Leicester Nirvana (9)	159
Match awarded to Leicester Nirvana as Coventry United fielded an ineligible player.
7	Deeping Rangers (9)	4–0	Eastwood Community (10)	432

Tie	Home team (tier)	Score	Away team (tier)	Att.
8	Histon (9)	2–1	Lye Town (9)	276
9	Willand Rovers (9)	1–0	Hamworthy United (9)	234
11	AFC Uckfield Town (9)	1–4	Windsor (9)	138
12	Cribbs (9)	0–2	Sholing (9)	155
13	Bearsted (9)	1–2 (a.e.t.)	Abbey Rangers (9)	257
14	Chertsey Town (9)	5–0	AFC St. Austell (10)	501
16	Cray Valley Paper Mills (9)	3–1	Baffins Milton Rovers (9)	139
Sunday 6 January 2019
10	Canterbury City (9)	3–2	Newport Pagnell Town (9)	259
15	Biggleswade (9)	1–0	Stowmarket Town (9)	527

== Fifth round proper ==
Tie	Home team (tier)	Score	Away team (tier)	Att.
Saturday 2 February 2019
1	Irlam (9)	P–P	Chertsey Town (9)	-
2	Cray Valley Paper Mills (9)	3–1	Abbey Rangers (9)	217
3	Histon (9)	1–3 (a.e.t.)	Northwich Victoria (9)	643
4	Sholing (9)	3–1	Sporting Khalsa (9)	441
5	Hebburn Town (9)	P–P	West Auckland Town (9)	-
7	Willand Rovers (9)	3–2	Deeping Rangers (9)	776

Tie	Home team (tier)	Score	Away team (tier)	Att.
8	Canterbury City (9)	2–1	Leicester Nirvana (9)	334
Sunday 3 February 2019
6	Biggleswade (9)	6–1	Windsor (9)	557
Saturday 9 February 2019
1	Irlam (9)	0–2	Chertsey Town (9)	449
5	Hebburn Town (9)	0–2	West Auckland Town (9)	1,310

== Quarter-finals ==
Tie	Home team (tier)	Score	Away team (tier)	Att.
Saturday 23 February 2019
1	West Auckland Town (9)	0–2	Chertsey Town (9)	738
3	Willand Rovers (9)	1–3	Cray Valley Paper Mills (9)	758

Tie	Home team (tier)	Score	Away team (tier)	Att.
4	Northwich Victoria (9)	3–1 (a.e.t.)	Sholing (9)	719
Sunday 24 February 2019
2	Canterbury City (9)	2–1	Biggleswade (9)	602

== Semi-finals ==
Semi final fixtures were played on 16 March and 23 March 2019, with the second leg going to extra time and penalties if required.

=== First leg ===
16 March 2019
15:00

Northwich Victoria (9)	P–P	Chertsey Town (9)

Wincham Park, Wincham

17 March 2019
15:00

Cray Valley Paper Mills (9)	1–0	Canterbury City (9)
Flack 55'

Badgers Sports Ground, Eltham
Attendance: 663
Referee: Josh Smith

24 March 2019
14:00

Northwich Victoria (9)	1–1	Chertsey Town (9)
Whyte 72'		Taylor 40'

Wincham Park, Wincham
Attendance: 1,288
Referee: James Oldham

=== Second leg ===
23 March 2019
15:10

Canterbury City (9)	1–1	Cray Valley Paper Mills (9)
Sayer 90'		Tomlin 71'

Salters Lane, Faversham
Attendance: 1,274
Referee: Josh Smith

Cray Valley Paper Mills won 2-1 on aggregate

30 March 2019
15:00

Chertsey Town (9)	0–0 (a.e.t.)	Northwich Victoria (9)
Penalties
Baxter (penalty scored); Guentchev (penalty scored); Taylor (penalty scored); Crossley (penalty scored); Murphy (penalty scored)	5–3	(penalty scored) Craig; (penalty missed) Winder; (penalty scored) Matthews; (penalty scored) Doran

Alwyns Lane, Chertsey
Attendance: 1,847
Referee: Savvas Yianni

Chertsey Town F.C. won 5-3 on penalties after drawing 1–1 on aggregate

== Final ==
19 May 2019
12:15 BST

Chertsey Town	3–1 (a.e.t.)	Cray Valley Paper Mills
Flegg 39'; Baxter 105' (pen.); Rowe 117'	Report	Tomlin 36'

Wembley Stadium, London
Attendance: 42,962
Referee: Ross Joyce
