= Herefordshire Football League (1899) =

Defunct association football league in England

- Founded: 1899
- Folded: 2016
- Country: England
- Divisions: 3
- Number of clubs: 39
- Promotion to: West Midlands (Regional) League Division Two
- League cup(s): League Shield; FW Peterson Cup; HJ Handley Cup; ClubportsTrophy; Strongbow Senior Cup
- Last champions: Premier: Wellington reserves One: Holme Lacy; Two: Ledbury Town reserves (2015–16)
- Website: Official Website – TheFA.com

The Herefordshire County League was an English football league based in the county of Herefordshire. The league, which is sponsored by Supercraft Structures Limited, currently has three divisions – the Premier Division, Division One, and Division Two. The league was affiliated to the Herefordshire County FA.

Whilst the Herefordshire League was not officially part of the National League System, clubs who won this league could apply to enter the lower division of the West Midlands (Regional) League.

The league occasionally had clubs from Wales as members – most recently in 2010, Hay St. Mary's entered their third team into the league in the Premier Division.

The League was wound up at the end of the 2015–16 season and replaced by The Herefordshire FA County League.

== Recent divisional champions ==
Season	Premier Division	Division One	Division Two	Division Three
2002–03	Wellington Rangers	Hereford Lads Club	Ross United Services reserves	Widemarsh Rangers
2003–04	Wellington Rangers	Tupsley	Wellington Rangers Colts	Bulmers
2004–05	Ewyas Harold	Bringsty Sports	Skenfrith United	Stoke Prior
2005–06	Ewyas Harold	Colwall Rangers	Ross Town reserves	Fownhope reserves
2006–07	Wellington Rangers	Widemarsh Rangers	Fownhope reserves	Bartonsham
2007–08	Woofferton	Ross Town	Hereford Lads Club Colts	Hampton Park Rangers
2008–09	Westfields reserves	Holme Lacy	Leintwardine	Hinton reserves
2009–10	Leominster Town	Leintwardine	Kingstone Rovers	Ledbury Town 'A'
2010–11	Westfields reserves	Mercia Athletic	Orleton Colts	Sinkum
2011–12	Ledbury Town	Sinkum	Dore Valley	Leominster Town Colts
2012–13	Wellington reserves	Weobley	Woofferton Colts	Bromyard
2013–14	Ewyas Harold	Tenbury United	Bromyard	Sinkum
2014–15	Ewyas Harold	Ledbury Town reserves	Tenbury Town	Tupsley
2015–16	Wellington reserves	Holme Lacy	Ledbury Town reserves	—
