= Radnorshire Challenge Cup =

Association football tournament in Wales

- Founded: 1963
- Region: Wales
- Current champions: Knighton Town
- 2025–26

The Radnorshire Challenge Cup is a football knockout tournament competed for by clubs either based within the Mid-Wales county boundary of Radnorshire or have a team in membership of the Mid Wales South League.

== Previous winners ==
Information from the commencement of the competition until the 1990–91 season sourced from the 1991 Welsh Football Almanac.

=== 1960s ===
- 1963–64: – Llandrindod Wells
- 1964–65: – Vale of Arrow (Gladestry)
- 1965–66: – Crossgates
- 1966–67: – Rhayader Town
- 1967–68: – Vale of Arrow (Gladestry)
- 1968–69: – Vale of Arrow (Gladestry)
- 1969–70: – Vale of Arrow (Gladestry)

=== 1970s ===
- 1970–71: – Crossgates
- 1971–72: – Knighton Town
- 1972–73: – Knighton Town
- 1973–74: – Hay St Marys
- 1974–75: – Presteigne St. Andrews
- 1975–76: – Builth Wells
- 1976–77: – Rhayader Town
- 1977–78: – Aberystwyth Town reserves
- 1978–79: – Knighton Town
- 1979–80: – Knighton Town

=== 1990s ===
- 1980–81: – Newtown reserves
- 1981–82: – Builth Wells
- 1982–83: – Builth Wells
- 1983–84: – Knighton Town
- 1984–85: – Presteigne St. Andrews
- 1985–86: – Newtown reserves
- 1986–87: – Builth Wells
- 1987–88: – Knighton Town
- 1988–89: – Talgarth Town
- 1989–90: – Builth Wells

=== 1990s ===
- 1990–91: – Vale of Arrow (Gladestry)
- 1991–92: – Builth Wells
- 1992–93: – Kington Town
- 1993–94: – Vale of Arrow (Gladestry)
- 1994–95: – Knighton Town
- 1995–96: – Llanidloes Town
- 1996–97: –
- 1997–98: – Presteigne St. Andrews
- 1999–2000: – Llandrindod Wells

=== 2000s ===
- 2000–01: – Rhayader Town
- 2001–02: – Rhayader Town
- 2002–03: – Knighton Town
- 2003–04: –
- 2004–05: – Presteigne St. Andrews
- 2005–06: –
- 2006–07: – Hay St Marys
- 2007–08: – Knighton Town
- 2008–09: – Rhayader Town
- 2009–10: – Presteigne St. Andrews

=== 2010s ===
- 2010–11: – Llandrindod Wells
- 2011–12: – Llandrindod Wells
- 2012–13: – Rhayader Town
- 2013–14: – Rhayader Town
- 2014–15: – Rhayader Town
- 2015–16: – Hay St Marys
- 2016–17: – Llandrindod Wells
- 2017–18: – Radnor Valley
- 2018–19: – Llanidloes Town
- 2019–20: – Competition abandoned due to Coronavirus pandemic

=== 2020s ===
- 2020–21: – No competition - Covid-19 pandemic
- 2021–22: – Hay St Marys
- 2022–23: – Radnor Valley
- 2023–24: – Builth Wells
- 2024–25: – Radnor Valley
- 2025–26: – Knighton Town

=== Number of wins by club ===
Note: missing seasons to be added.

- Knighton Town – 10
- Rhayader Town – 8
- Builth Wells – 6
- Vale of Arrow (Gladestry) – 6
- Llandrindod Wells – 5
- Presteigne St. Andrews – 5
- Hay St Marys – 4
- Crossgates – 2
- Llanidloes Town – 2
- Newtown reserves – 2
- Radnor Valley – 2
- Aberystwyth Town reserves – 1
- Kington Town – 1
- Talgarth Town – 1
