= Penybont United F.C. =

Association football club in Powys, Wales

Penybont United
- Full name: Penybont United Football Club
- Nickname: The Polecats
- Founded: 1945
- Ground: Racecourse Ground
- League: Mid Wales South
- 2025–26: Mid Wales South 7th of 12

Penybont United Football Club is a Welsh football team based in Penybont, Powys, Wales. The team play in the Mid Wales South.

== History ==
Football in Penybont dates back as early as 1884, with a match reported against Llandrindod Wells, which Penybont won 1–0. On 30 December 1922 a crowd of over 1,000 saw them beat Builth St Mary 4–1. This club folded in 1929.

Penybont United was reformed in 1945. They were ever-present members of the Mid Wales South League until promotion in 2014. During that time they were also known as Penybont Athletic. After promotion, the club joined the Mid Wales Football League, but returned to the Mid Wales South League in 2018 after four seasons of struggle, and three consecutive last-place finishes. In 2022 the club joined the Central Wales Football League in its newly-formed Southern Division.

The club also has a women's team, which won the Herefordshire League in 2024–25.

== Honours ==
- Mid Wales South League
  - Champions: 1953–54, 1954–55, 1955–56, 1956–57, 1969–70, 1992–93, 1994–95
  - Runners-up: 1962–63, 1968–69, 1972–73, 1993–94, 2012–13
- Mid Wales South League Cup – Winners: 1973–74, 1992–93, 2013–14, 2018–19
- Emrys Morgan Cup – Winners: 2011–12
- Felindre Cup – Winners: 2025
