= Llandrindod Wells F.C. =

Association football club in Wales

Coordinates: 52°14′30″N 3°22′22″W

Llandrindod Wells
- Full name: Llandrindod Wells Football Club
- Nickname: The Spamen
- Founded: 1883
- Ground: Lant Avenue Broadway
- Chairman: Grunt Davies
- Manager: Gareth Jones
- League: Mid Wales South
- 2025–26: Ardal NE League, 13th of 16 (voluntary relegation)
Home colours	Away colours

Llandrindod Wells Football Club are an association football club based in the town of Llandrindod Wells, Powys, Wales. The club plays in the Mid Wales South.

== History ==
Llandrindod Wells were formed in November 1883.

The club played in the Mid Wales League until a second-place finish resulted in promotion to the Cymru Alliance in 1994. They remained in the Cymru Alliance for four seasons before returning to the Mid Wales League in 1998. During the 2003–04 season the club resigned from the Mid Wales League and its record was expunged.

On 24 April 2010, Llandrindod won the J. Emrys Morgan Cup by beating Montgomery Town 1–0.

After enjoying a good 2010–11 season, the first team finished runners up in the Mid Wales League South, ending a point behind Builth Wells and were promoted to the Mid Wales League Division Two, at the time a newly formed division.

For the 2011–12 season saw Llandrindod placed fourth behind winners Aberaeron, with second placed Four Crosses also promoted to the Division One. Llanfair United placed 3rd. The season ended with cup success, defeating Hay St Mary's to win the Radnorshire Cup at Builth Wells.

In the 2012–13 season, Llandrindod firsts played their second season in Division Two. After a very good start, going undefeated in the first 10 games, the side fell away after Christmas but finished the season as runners up to winners Llanfair United. Both clubs were promoted to Division One for the 2013–14 season.

In the 2013–14 season the Llandrindod first team won a staggering 16 games out of 16 in their inaugural season in Division One This included an opening day 8–1 away win at local rivals Builth Wells and a further 13–0 win away at Montgomery Town. The team went on to maintain their form enough over the season to win the Division One title at their first attempt. The team remained undefeated at home in the league, dropping just 2 points. The season culminated in a must win match against Montgomery Town. A 3–1 win secured the league title and in the process took the team to 101 goals in just 28 games, whilst also conceding the fewest goals. Remarkably, the runners-up spot was taken by fellow promoted club Llanfair United. Over the season, some 20 players featured in the team. Injuries and absences took their toll after Christmas but the whole squad and strength in depth ensured that the team triumphed and won the league for the first time in 47 years. Of the whole squad, at least 15 players had played at junior and youth level for the club.

After ground improvements in the new year of 2014, the club met the ground criteria for the 2014–15 season to return to the Cymru Alliance, the second tier of the Welsh football league system. The reserve team again competed in the Mid Wales South League for the 2014–15 season.

After one season in the Cymru Alliance they were relegated back to the Mid Wales League, after finishing second-bottom.

In 2020 the club were founding members of the Ardal South East. In 2022 they transferred to the Ardal North East. In July 2026 the club resigned from the league and joined the Mid Wales South League (tier 5) for the 2026–27 season. They had attempted to sign over 60 players but their efforts were unsuccessful as they had to cancel some pre-season fixtures due to not having enough players available. The chairman Rob Nicholls described this as "an opportunity to reset, rebuild and secure a sustainable future for our club".

== Honours ==
- Mid Wales Football League Division One – Champions: 1961–62, 1966–67, 2013–14
- Mid Wales Football League Division One – Runners-up: 1962–63, 1964–65, 1993–94, 2019–20
- Mid Wales Football League Division Two – Runners-up: 2012–13
- Mid Wales South League – Runners-up: 1964–65, 1997–98, 2009–10
- Mid Wales South League Cup – Winners: 2010–11 (reserves)
- Mid Wales South League Cup – Finalists: 2009–10
- J. Emrys Morgan Cup Winners: 2009–10
- Radnorshire Challenge Cup – Winners: 1962–63, 1999–2000, 2010–11, 2011–12, 2016–17
- Radnorshire Challenge Cup – Finalists: 1974–75, 1991–92, 2014–15, 2022–23, 2025–26
- SWFA Intermediate Cup – Winners: 1897–98

== International players ==
Players selected to play for Wales: Carl Robinson 1999–2009 – 52 caps
