= Felindre, Beguildy =

Village in Powys, Wales

Coordinates: 52.424°N 3.224°W

Felindre
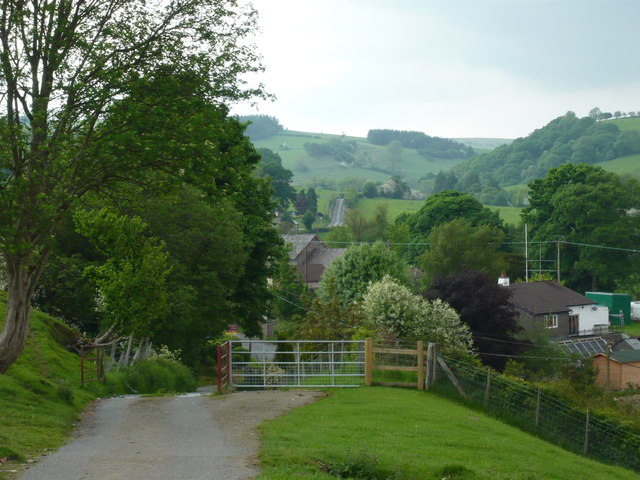

- Location within Powys
- Community: Beguildy
- Principal area: Powys
- Preserved county: Powys
- Country: Wales
- Sovereign state: United Kingdom
- Police: Dyfed-Powys
- Fire: Mid and West Wales
- Ambulance: Welsh
- UK Parliament: Brecon, Radnor and Cwm Tawe
- Senedd Cymru – Welsh Parliament: Brecon and Radnorshire

Felindre is a village in the community of Beguildy, in Powys, Wales. It was historically in Radnorshire.

The village has a pub, the Wharf Inn, and a chapel. The village was also formerly home of the Felindre Women's Institute, which closed in November 2024 after running for nearly 100 years. The village also has a football club, Felindre F.C., who play at Bright Park in the village and are currently members of the Montgomeryshire League.
