= Radnor Valley F.C. =

Association football club in Wales

Coordinates: 52°14′14″N 3°8′28″W

Radnor Valley
- Full name: Radnor Valley Football Club
- Nickname: The Goats
- Founded: 1921
- Ground: The Bypass
- League: Ardal NE League
- 2025–26: Ardal NE League, 9th of 16

Radnor Valley Football Club is a Welsh football team based in New Radnor, near Presteigne, Powys. The team currently play in the Ardal NE League.

== History ==
The original version of the club was formed in 1921. The current incarnation of the club dates from 1984.

== Honours ==
- Central Wales Southern Division – Champions: 2022–23
- Mid Wales Football League League Cup – Winners: 2021–22
- Mid Wales South League - Champions: 2014–15
- Radnorshire Cup – Winners: 2017–18, 2022–23, 2024–25
- Radnorshire Cup – Finalists: 1964–65, 1971–72, 2018–19, 2021–22, 2023-24
- Mid Wales South League Cup – Winners: 1971–72
- Central Wales Challenge Cup – Finalists: 2024–25
