= Ross Town F.C. =

Coordinates: 51°54′43.88″N 2°35′45.89″W

Ross Town
- Full name: Ross Town Football Club
- Founded: 1993
- Dissolved: 2009
- Ground: Ross-on-Wye
- Capacity: 3,000
- 2008–09: Herefordshire Football League; Premier Division, 11th
Home colours	Away colours

Ross Town F.C. was a football club based in Ross-on-Wye, Herefordshire, England. The club was formed in the summer of 1993 following the amalgamation of the town's two senior sides, Ross United and Woodville, and joined the Herefordshire League Premier Division. They joined the Hellenic Football League Division One in 1996 but dropped back down to the Herefordshire League in 2007. In late 2009 Ross Town resigned from the Herefordshire League and folded.

Their ground was on a loop of the River Wye. The club was affiliated to the Herefordshire County FA.
