= Beguildy =

Beguildy: Welsh: Bugeildy
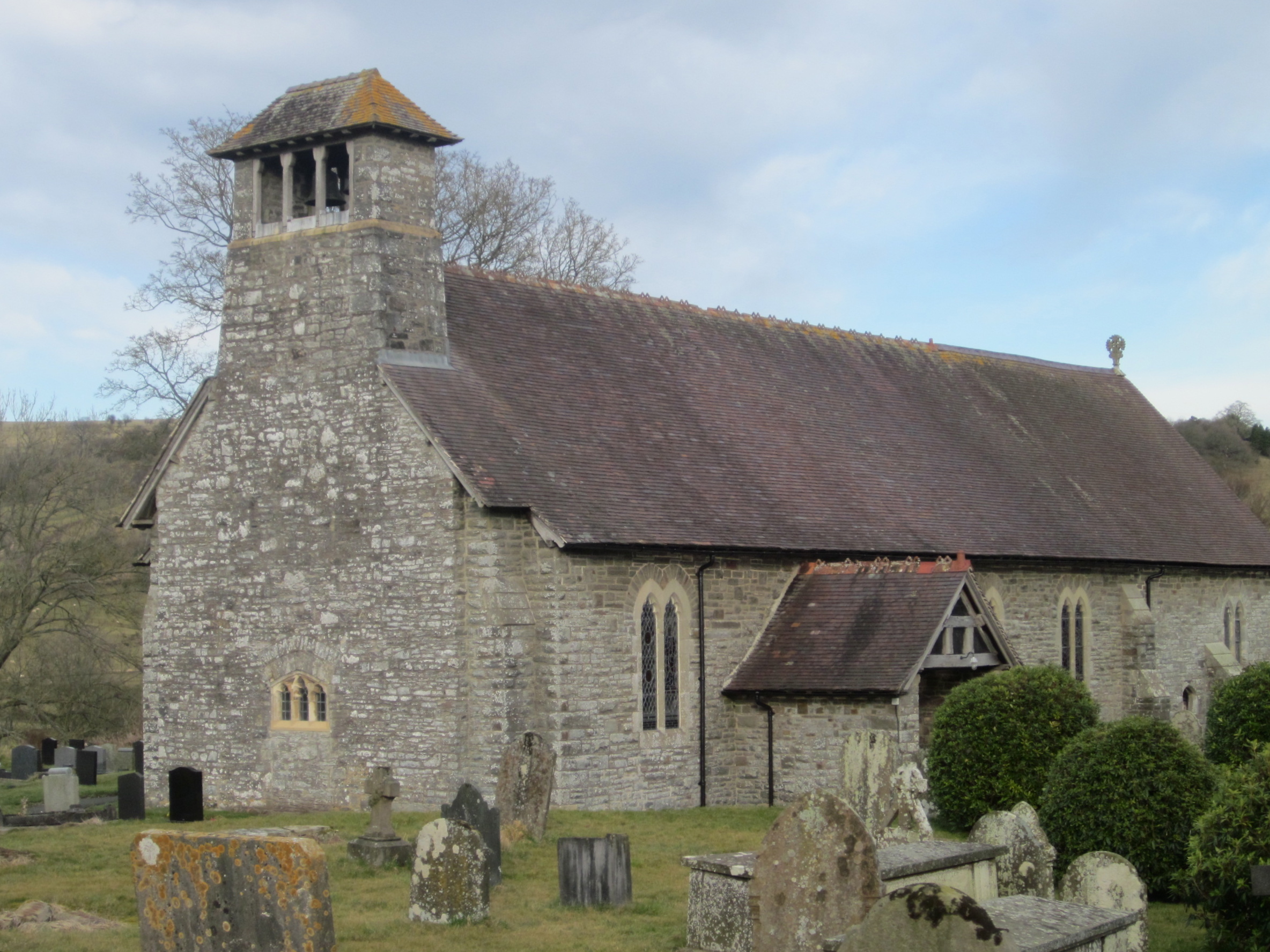
- Beguildy Church

- Location within Powys
- Population: 723 (2011)
- OS grid reference: SO194797
- Community: Beguildy
- Principal area: Powys
- Preserved county: Powys
- Country: Wales
- Sovereign state: United Kingdom
- Post town: KNIGHTON
- Postcode district: LD7
- Dialling code: 01547
- Police: Dyfed-Powys
- Fire: Mid and West Wales
- Ambulance: Welsh
- UK Parliament: Brecon, Radnor and Cwm Tawe
- List of places UK Wales Powys 52.409°N 3.184°W Community map: Map of the community

Beguildy (Welsh: Bugeildy) is a village and community in Powys, Wales. In 2011 the community had a population of 723.

It lies in a remote tract of countryside, 8 miles (13 km) northwest of Knighton, on the B4355 road to Newtown, near the headwaters of the River Teme, at an elevation of 254 metres (833 ft).

The village has a pub, the Radnorshire Arms, a post office, and a place of worship. Beguildy Church in Wales Primary School closed in 2013.

== Toponymy ==
Beguildy is an anglicization of Bugeildy, which means shepherd-house in Welsh, from bugail for shepherd and tŷ for house.

== Community ==
The large, rural community of Beguildy includes the settlements of Beguildy, Felindre, Dutlas, Lloyney, Heyope and Knucklas. It falls in the historic county of Radnorshire. An electoral ward in the same name exists. At the 2011 Census this ward had a population of 1,411.

== Castle ==
Beguildy Castle is a Norman motte-and-bailey castle of which the well preserved 20 foot high motte and earthworks remain. The village and the castle lie on the border between England and Wales.

== Church ==
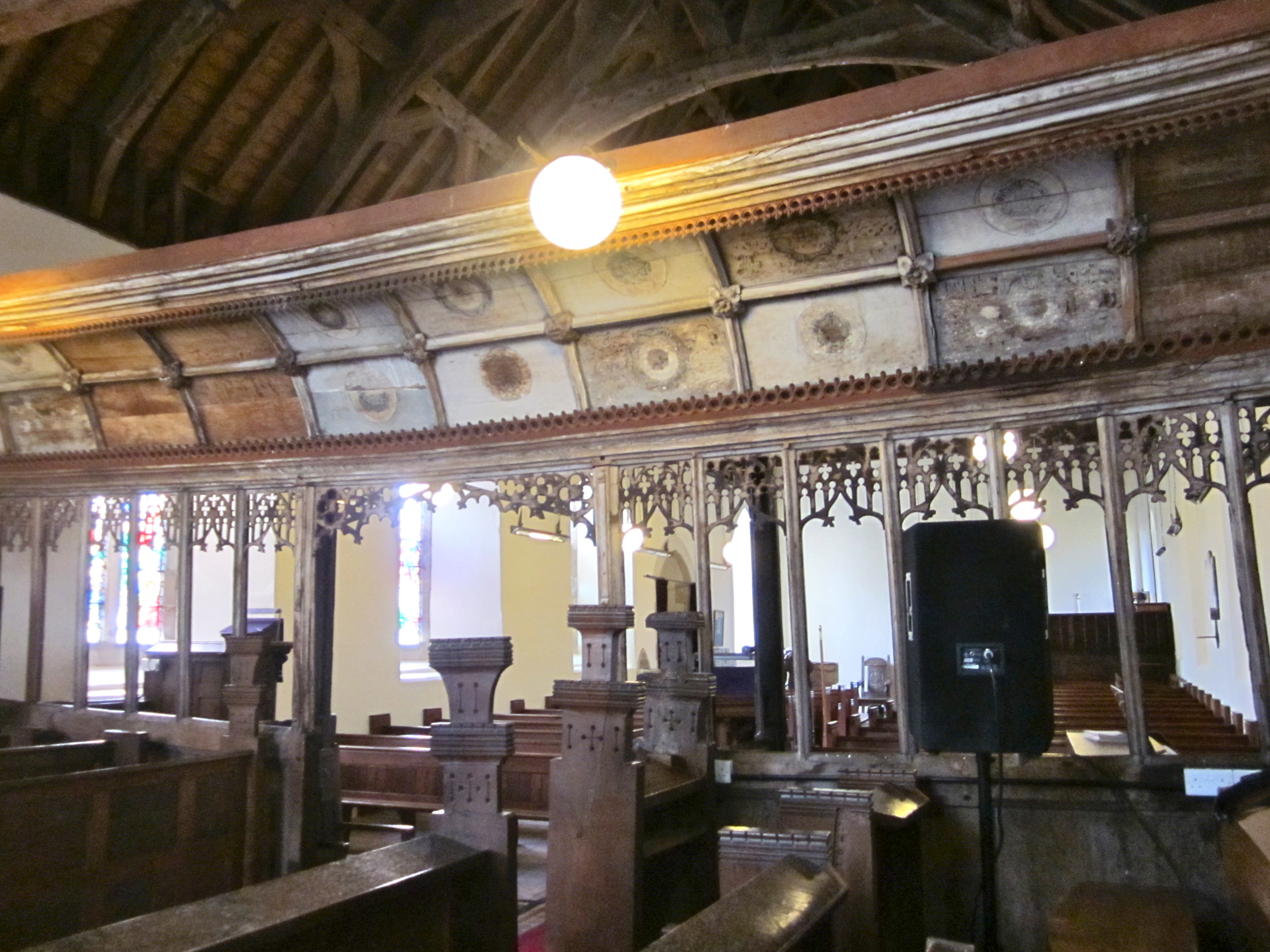
Medieval screen in Beguildy Church

The church, which is mainly 14th century, was restored considerably in the 19th century, with the chancel being rebuilt in 1885 and the nave restored in 1896 (to the design by William Radford Bryden). The original tower collapsed in the 19th century and bells, which date from 1661 and 1664, were re-hung in their present position in 1936.

The church features a 14th-century octagonal font (which reputed to carry marks made by Cromwell's troops sharpening their swords), a holy water stoup at the south door and a priests door in the south wall. The rood screen is a fine example of 15th century workmanship and is well preserved, bearing the original coloured Tudor roses. Probably from the same period are two oak benches. The dug out parish chest, which was reputedly hewn out of a solid block of timber, is an ancient churchwarden's chest and probably dates from the 13th century. At the end of the chest is an iron ring for use when it was drawn by a horse to be buried or hidden in times of trouble. One part of the chest would have held the church valuables and the other the churchwarden's treasures. Each compartment was locked separately. The church is well endowed with 20th-century stained glass windows. In the porch there are two sculpted heads. They were sculpted as a representative of the vicar when the Church was renovated by a stonemason called James Wear(1837–1913)

== Associations ==
John Dee has probably been incorrectly associated with Beguildy. He served at the court of Elizabeth I as the royal tutor in mathematics. He later became the Queen's Ambassador to Poland but is remembered as a distinguished early scientist and astronomer. He was reputedly a descendant of Rhodri Mawr, King of Wales.
