= Crickhowell F.C. =

Football club based in Powys

Crickhowell
- Full name: Crickhowell Football Club
- Founded: 1878 as Crickhowell Victoria Club; 1893 as Crickhowell Football Club
- Ground: Elvicta Football Ground
- League: Gwent County League Division Two
- 2025–26: Gwent County League Division Two, 7th of 11
Home colours	Away colours

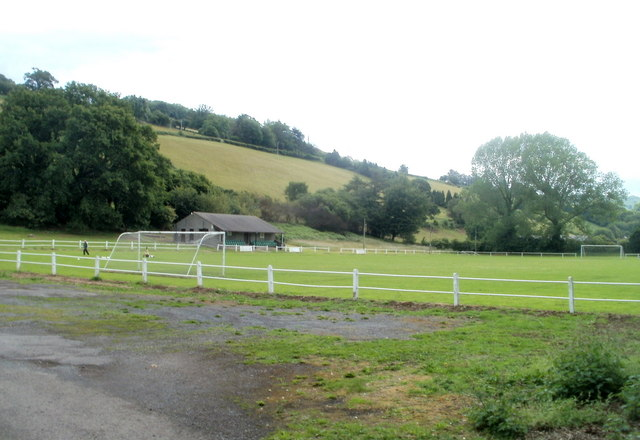
Elvicta Football Ground

Crickhowell Football Club is a Welsh football club based in Crickhowell, Powys. They currently play in the Gwent County League Division Two.

The club plays at the Elvicta Football Ground.

== History ==
Crickhowell Victoria Club was founded in 1878, after a meeting at the Victoria Reading Rooms in Crickhowell.

A new Crickhowell Football Club was founded in 1893. They originally played in black and white.

Crickhowell first entered the Abergavenny and District League for the 1908–09 season. They finished third in their first season, in addition to playing friendlies. In the 1908–09 season they played 25 games, winning 13, drawing 3, and losing 9, including all matches from all competitions.

In the following season the club continued playing in the Abergavenny and District League. They appointed R. Williams as captain and T. Jones of Llangrwyney as vice-captain for the new season. Williams had previously played for a junior team in Newport, and Jones was described as a "very promising player" in the Abergavenny Chronicle.

For the 1910–11 season E. W. Williams was made captain, with R. Williams demoted to vice-captain. The club also entered the South Wales Junior Cup. In December 1910 they played Llangrwyney, with a fair crowd. There was an "intense rivalry" between the two teams.

The club later went on to finish runners-up in the Abergavenny and District League. By June 1915 the club was defunct, as reported with the death of former captain R. Williams. In 1916 another death was reported, of Pte. Geo. Davies, who had previously served as secretary at the club.

By 1919 the club had reformed. On 11 January 1919 they played a home match against Clydach Juniors, losing 2–0. A week later they played Abergavenny Juniors, losing 2–1 in a "creditable performance".

In 1927 Crickhowell A.F.C. rejoined the Abergavenny League, and played their first match against Brynmawr.

In 1934–35 Crickhowell won the Brecon and District League.

In 1969 they won the Brecon and District League Cup, beating Hilltop Sports 5–4 after extra time in the final. In the 1982–83 season they won the Mid Wales South League Cup.

In 1990 the club were Mid Wales South League champions, and joined the Mid Wales Football League. The club left the league in 1992 and returned to the Mid Wales South League. They then left the Central Wales Football Association system in 1994, to join the Gwent Central League. In their first season they won Division Two.

In 1998 Crickhowell won the Open Cup, winning the final on penalties against Fairfield United. In the following season they defended the Open Cup with a 3–0 win over Owens Corning, and made it a double by winning the Gwent Central League Division One. They again won the league in 2005, and joined the Gwent County League Division Three, where they would remain until relegation back to the Gwent Central League in 2010.

In 2014 they ended a dry run of over a decade, beating Blaenavon Blues 2–1 to lift the Langdon Cup. Two years later Crickhowell again won the Gwent Central League Division One. As a result, they returned to the Gwent County League.

In March 2024 the club were aiming to raise money for development of their facilities. Less than two months later, they won the Langdon Cup on penalties against Forgeside.

In April 2025 they won the Open Cup. In September 2025 they played their first match in the J. Emrys Morgan Cup for thirty years, losing 5–0 to Ffostrasol Wanderers.

== Honours ==
- Gwent Central League Division One - Champions: 1998–99, 2004–05, 2015–16
- Gwent Central League Division Two - Champions: 1994–95
- Mid Wales South League - Champions: 1989–90
- Mid Wales South League Cup - Winners: 1982–83
- Brecon and District League - Champions: 1934–35
- Brecon and District League Cup - Winners: 1968–69
- Gwent Central League Open Cup - Winners: 1997–98, 1998–99, 2024–25
- Gwent Central League Langdon Cup - Winners: 2013–14, 2023–24
