= Felindre F.C. =

Football club based in Powys

Felindre
- Full name: Felindre Football Club
- Nickname: The Millers
- Founded: 2017
- Ground: Bright Park
- League: Montgomeryshire League
- 2024–25: Montgomeryshire League, 10th of 13
Home colours	Away colours

Felindre F.C. is a Welsh football club based in Felindre, Powys. The team currently plays in the Montgomeryshire League.

== History ==
Felindre won three Mid Wales South League titles from 1963 to 1965. They also played in the 1959–60 Welsh Cup, losing to Knighton Town in the first round after a replay. In 1960 they won a Welsh Amateur Cup third round match against Newtown. However the club folded in 1965 after their third league title.

Felindre reformed in 2017, rejoining the Mid Wales South League. Their first win came in November, against Brecon Northcote reserves.

In 2023 the league folded, so they joined the Montgomeryshire League. In 2024 they won the Bernie Jones Memorial Trophy, with a 1–0 win over Waterloo Rovers reserves at Llansantffraid-ym-Mechain. This was described as "their first piece of major silverware for nearly 60 years". Felindre won it again in 2026.
