= Knighton Town F.C. =

Association football club in Wales

Knighton Town FC
- Full name: Knighton Town Association Football Club
- Nicknames: The Robins, The Borderers
- Founded: 1887; 139 years ago
- Ground: The Showground, Knighton
- Capacity: 1,200 (96 seated)
- League: Ardal NE League
- 2025–26: Ardal NE League, 2nd of 16
- Website: http://www.knightontownfc.co.uk
Home colours	Away colours

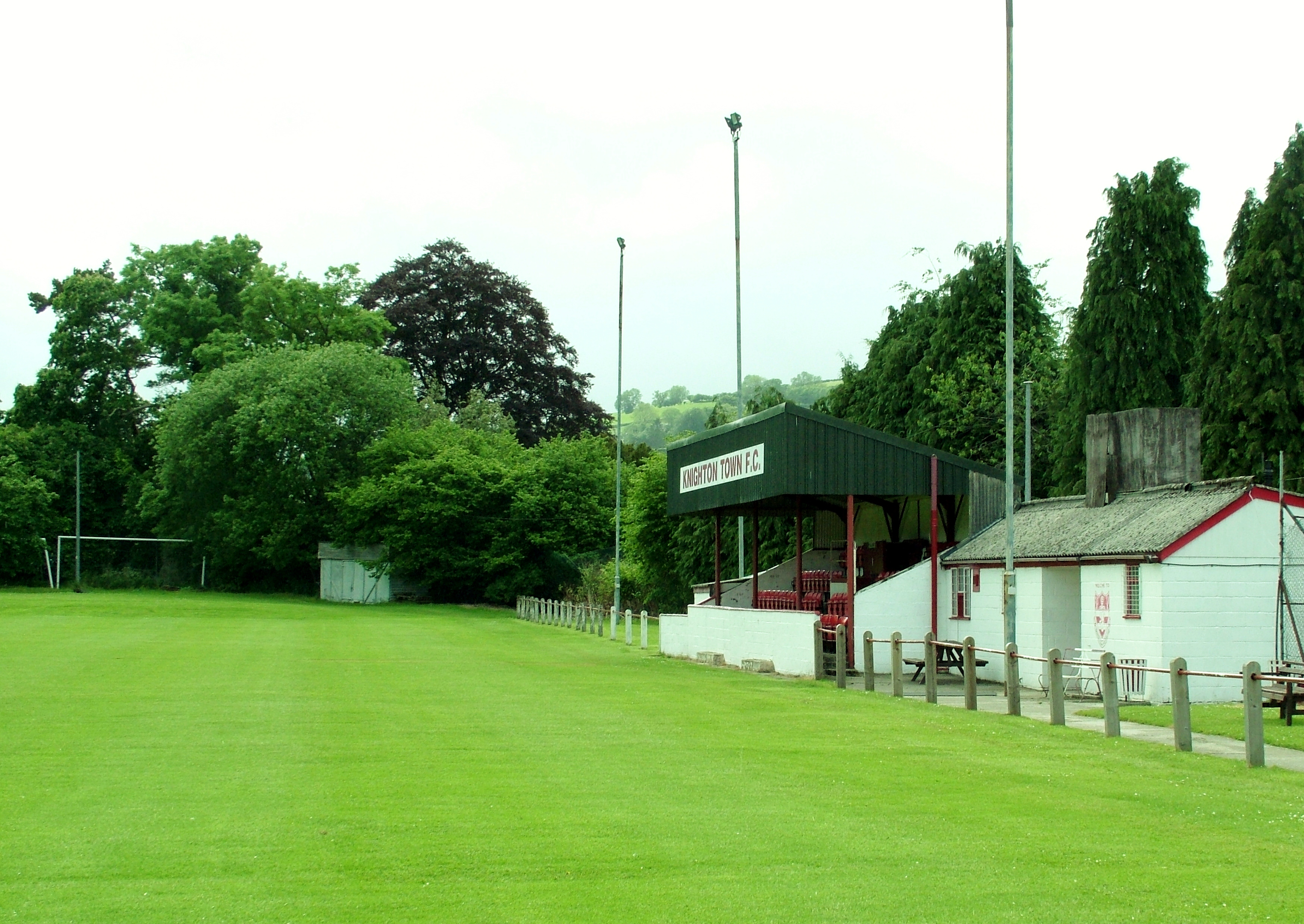

Knighton Town Football Club is a Welsh football club founded officially in 1887, although a club or team had represented Knighton certainly as early as 1882 . They play in the Ardal NE League.

== 2015–16 The Return to Mid Wales Football's Top Division ==
Knighton's return to top flight football in The Mid Wales League was successful, narrowly missing out on back-to-back league titles on the final day of the season to Penrhyncoch, just missing out on a return to The Cymru Alliance league by one point. They also did well in the FAW Cup reaching the 2nd round proper by defeating Kerry A.F.C. (H) 4–0, Welshpool Town (H) 2–1 in the qualifying rounds and Dyffryn Nant Vale (A) 2–1 in the 1st round before losing to Holywell Town (A) 6–3. In the FAW Trophy they defeated Machynlleth (A) 2–1 in the 2nd round before bowing out 3–2 away at Greenfield after extra time.

== 2014–15 Mid Wales League Division 2 League and Cup Double ==
Knighton Town were promoted as champions of Mid Wales League Division 2 scoring 113 league goals, much owing to the striker Connor Bird who netted 30, midfielder Mark Jones who hit 26 and winger Adrian Jones who netted 22. Knighton also conceded only 18 league goals all season which was the best defensive record in Welsh senior football. Losing only 1 league game all season, Knighton Town racked up a record points total with a goal difference of +95.

Knighton completed a league and cup double (E.R. Jenkins Cup) winning 4–3 after extra time against Borth United played at Penrhyncoch. Knighton took the lead midway through the first half through a Sam Williams header. Borth turned the game on its head with Bryn McGilligan Oliver scoring twice in four minutes on 70' and 74'. As injury time reached the forth minute, Adam Worton equalised with a 25-yard volley into the far top corner. Extra time was only 2 minutes old when the league champions took the lead for a second time when Mark Jones raced onto a through ball and calmly clipped the ball over the keeper and into the bottom corner. Knighton quickly ended the game with substitute Marc Wozencraft putting them 4–2 up with a thumping header, from a Mark Jones cross. Borth did get a late consolation through Ryan Davies, but Knighton would still win the Mid Wales league cup double.

The Robins also exceeded all expectations in the FAW Cup by reaching the 2nd proper, the only tier 4 side to do so.

== 1991–92 Mid Wales League Championship ==
In 1991–92 Knighton won their first Mid Wales League Championship for 88:years. They lost one league game all season away at Aberystwyth Town. They clinched the title by winning 3–2 away at Morda United in front of over 700 in attendance. Before the match Morda United were 2 points above Knighton, so only a win would have seen them champions. In the last minute of the game with the score tied at 2–2, Knighton midfielder Sean Parker scored the winner in a goal mouth scramble.

The club started the 2020–21 season in the Mid Wales League East Division but resigned in December 2021 with the club's reserve team in the Mid Wales South League becoming the senior team.

== Honours ==
- Welsh Cup
  - Semi-finalists: 1896–97, 1903–04
- Welsh National League (Mid Wales Section)
  - Runners-up: – 1925
- Ardal NE
  - Runners-up: – 2025–26
- Central Wales League
  - Champions: – 2024–25 (Southern Division)
- Mid Wales League:
  - Champions: – 1901–02, 1902–03, 1903–04, 1991–92.
  - Runners-up: – 1900–01, 1905–06, 1906–07, 1945–46, 1949–50, 1983–84, 2015–16.
- Mid Wales League Division Two
  - Champions: – 2014-15
- Mid Wales League Cup
  - Winners: – 1952–53, 1960–61, 1968–69, 1988–89
  - Finalists: – 1962–63, 1965–66, 1967–68
- Mid Wales League South
  - Champions: – 2002–03, 2003–04
  - Runners-up: – 1974–75
- South Shropshire League
  - Runners-up: 1920–21
- North Herefordshire League
  - Division 1 Champions: – 1931–32
  - Runners-up: – 1934–35, 1951–52
- Central Wales Challenge Cup
  - Winners: – 1969–70, 1971–72
  - Finalists: – 1975–76
- J. Emrys Morgan Cup:
  - Winners: – 2003–04
- Radnorshire Cup
  - Winners: – 1971–72, 1972–73, 1978–79, 1979–80, 1983–84, 1987–88, 1994–95, 2002–03, 2007–08, 2025–26
  - Finalists: – 1973–74, 1984–85, 1993–94, 2011–12, 2012–13, 2017–18
- Highest League Position 4th in the Cymru Alliance, 1997–98 * since formation of Welsh Premier League/League of Wales 1992

== Club records ==
Record Attendance: vs 2,211 v Hereford United, Welsh Cup 4th Round, 1981
Record Victory: 16–0 v Bucknell United, Home – Mid Wales League South, 2004
Record Defeat: 0–16 v Cardiff City, Away, Welsh Cup 5th Round, 1961

== League history ==
- 1887–1914 Mid Wales League
- 1920–1924 Shropshire League
- 1924–1931 Mid Wales League
- 1931–1939 North Herefordshire League
- 1946–1992 Mid Wales League
- 1992–1999 Cymru Alliance
- 1999–2000 Mid Wales League
- 2000–2004 Mid Wales South League
- 2004–2008 Mid Wales League
- 2008–2011 Mid Wales South League
- 2011–2025 Mid Wales League / Central Wales League (league renamed around 2020)
- 2025– Ardal North East
