= Herefordshire Football League =

Association football league in England

- Founded: 2016
- Country: England
- Divisions: 3
- Number of clubs: 37
- Level on pyramid: Level 11 (Premier Division)
- Feeder to: Hellenic Football League; West Midlands (Regional) League
- Promotion to: Hellenic League Division One; West Midlands (Regional) League Division Two
- Domestic cups: Herefordshire County Challenge Cup; Herefordshire Charity Bowl; Herefordshire FA Junior Cup
- Current champions: Premier: Bromyard Town; One: Ewyas Harold; Two: Leominster Town; (2025–26)
- Sponsor(s): Hummel
- Website: Official website

The Herefordshire Football League, known for sponsorship purposes as hummel Herefordshire Football League, is an association football competition based in Herefordshire, England. It also features some clubs from surrounding counties, including Gloucestershire, Worcestershire and Shropshire. The Premier Division operates at level 11 of the English football league system and is a regional feeder league to Step 6 of the National League System.

== History ==
The league was established in 2016 as Herefordshire FA County League after the disbandment of the Herefordshire Football League.

In July 2019, the league was restructured with the Premier Division increasing from 13 to 15 clubs.

In 2021, the Premier Division became a feeder league to Step 6 of the National League System. Hartpury University became the first club to be promoted to Hellenic League Division One.

In July 2022, the competition was renamed to Herefordshire Football League and the Premier Division expanded to 18 teams.

In February 2023, the Herefordshire FA agreed a two-year sponsorship deal with broadband company Zzoomm which saw the Herefordshire Football League be renamed the Zzoomm Herefordshire Football League from the 2023–24 season.

== Member clubs 2026–27 ==
=== Premier Division ===
- AFC Kempsey
- AFC Worcester
- Clee Hill United
- Gloucester City Reserves
- Hereford Lads Club
- Hereford Pegasus Development
- Kington Town
- Ledbury
- Littleton
- Ludlow Town reserves
- Perrywood
- Pershore Town Development
- UDA Gloucester
- Welland
- Wellington
- Worcester City reserves
- Worcester United

=== Division One ===
- AFC Worcester II
- Bartestree
- Bartonsham Bulls
- Belmont Wanderers
- Ewyas Harold
- Fownhope
- Greyhound
- Hereford Pegasus Colts
- Hinton
- Holme Lacy
- Kington Town reserves
- Ledbury reserves
- Leominster Town
- Newent Town Reserves
- Tenbury United
- Wellington reserves
- Westfields reserves
- Worcester United Reserves

=== Division Two ===
- AFC Worcester 4s
- Belmont Wanderers Reserves
- Bromyard Town Reserves
- Burghill Rangers
- Civil Service
- Hinton reserves
- Holme Lacy Reserves
- Kidderminster Town
- Ledbury Development
- Leominster Town Reserves
- Littleton U23s
- Powick
- Tenbury United Colts
- Worcester United Development

== Past winners ==
Season	Premier Division	Division One	Division Two
2016–17	Hinton	Tenbury Town	Burghill Rangers
2017–18	Wellington reserves	Kingstone Rovers	Bartestree reserves
2018–19	Clee Hill United	Ludlow Town Colts	Hereford Lads Club Colts
2019–20	Season(s) abandoned due to coronavirus pandemic		
2020–21	Season(s) abandoned due to coronavirus pandemic		
2021–22	Hartpury University	Worcester United	Ewyas Harold
2022–23	Sporting Club Inkberrow	Hereford Lads Club reserves	Wellington Colts
2023–24	Wellington	Welland	Ro-Stars Hereford
2024–25	Alcester Town	AFC Worcester	Greyhound
2025–26	Bromyard Town	Ewyas Harold	Leominster Town
