= Herefordshire County Football Association =

Governing body of association football in Herefordshire, England

- Purpose: Football Association
- Headquarters: County Ground Offices; Widemarsh Common
- Location: Hereford HR4 9NA
- Chief Executive: Craig Oakley
- Website: herefordshirefa.com

The Herefordshire Football Association, simply known as the Herefordshire FA or HFA, is the governing body of football in the county of Herefordshire. It runs several league and cup competitions in the county.

== Administration ==
The Herefordshire FA consists of two key bodies.

The Council, comprising 17 elected representatives from the Leagues within the county plus 11 Life Members. The Council meets 4 times per year to consider policy issues and direction, as well as to approve proposals put forward by the various committees.

The Board was established in 1998 to make the decision-making process more streamlined, is responsible for major business, strategic and commercial decisions. The Board comprises six elected representatives from the Council, plus the HFA Chief Executive and Company Secretary.

The Herefordshire FA are committed to developing and administering the game at all levels within the county. In line with The Football Association's Whole Sport Plan, the County FA has produced a four-year plan aimed at providing everyone with the opportunity to participate in football for life.

They are keen to develop partnerships to promote the benefits of football and improve the facilities where football is played. Working with key partners we hope to access essential funding which can be invested to increase the quantity and quality of pitches and facilities providing more and better playing opportunities.

== Affiliated leagues and competitions ==
=== Men's Saturday Leagues ===
- Herefordshire FA County League

=== Men's Sunday Leagues ===
- Herefordshire Sunday League

=== Youth Leagues ===
- Herefordshire Junior League
- Herefordshire Girls League
- HFA Floodlit Youth League

=== Small Sided Leagues ===
- HFA Indoor League

=== Cup Competitions ===
- HFA County Challenge
- HFA Senior Cup
- HFA Charity Bowl
- HFA Junior Cup
- HFA Burghill Cup
- HFA Giantkillers
- HFA Sunday Cup
- HFA Women's Cup
- HFA Youth Cup
- Tesco Cup Boys
- Tesco Cup Girls U14
- Tesco Cup Girls U16

== Affiliated Member Clubs ==
All the clubs (First Teams ONLY) that are affiliated to the Herefordshire FA are:

- Bartestree
- Civil Service
- Clee Hill United
- Coppertops
- Dore Valley
- Ewyas Harold
- Fownhope
- Hinton
- Holme Lacy
- Kington Town
- Ledbury Town
- Leominster Town
- Ludlow Town Colts
- Shobdon
- Sporting Club Inkberrow F.C.
- Tenbury United
- The Broadleys
- Welland
- Wellington Rangers
- Worcester United

== List of recent County Cup Winners ==
Season	HFA County Challenge	HFA Charity Bowl	HFA Junior Cup	HFA Burghill Cup
2004–05		Ewyas Harold	Ewyas Harold Reserves	Skenfrith United
2005–06		Ewyas Harold	Colwall Rangers	Civil Service
2006–07	Ledbury Town	Ewyas Harold	Widemarsh Rangers	Fownhope Reserves
2007–08	Westfields	Woofferton	Pegasus Colts	Holme Lacy
2008–09	Wellington	Westfields	Wellington Colts	Leintwardine Colts
2009–10	Ledbury Town	Leominster Town	Ewyas Harold Reserves	Hinton Reserves
2010–11	Westfields	Westfields	Mercia Athletic	Kingstone Rovers
2011–12	Westfields	Ledbury Town	Weobley	Sinkum
2012–13	Westfields	Westfields Reserves	Weobley	Weobley
2013–14	Westfields			
2014–15	Westfields			
2015–16	Hereford			
2016–17	Hereford	Ewyas Harold	Wellington Colts	
2017–18	Hereford	Malvern Town U21	Kingstone Rovers	
2018–19		Ledbury Town	Ludlow Town Colts	
2019–20	Competition abandoned			
2020–21	Hereford Lads Club	Hereford Pegasus Reserves	Fownhope	
2021–22	Hartpury University	Hereford Pegasus Reserves	Ross Juniors	
2022–23	Westfields	Ledbury Town	Wellington Colts	

== List of recent Herefordshire Football League winners ==
Season	Premier Division	Division One	Division Two
2016–17	Hinton	Tenbury United	Burghill Rangers
2017–18	Wellington Reserves	Kingstone Rovers	Bartestree Reserves
2018–19	Clee Hill United	Ludlow Town Colts	Lads Club Colts
2019–20	Bartestree	Civil Service	Bartestree Reserves
2020–21	Clee Hill United	Hereford Lads Club Reserves	Lower Teme & Martley United
2021–22	Hartpury University	Worcester United	Ewyas Harold
2022–23	Sporting Club Inkberrow	Hereford Lads Club Reserves	Wellington Colts
