= Talgarth Town F.C. =

Association football club in Wales

Talgarth Town
- Full name: Talgarth Town Football Club
- Nickname: The Royals
- Founded: 1969
- Ground: King George V Playing Fields
- Chairman: Keith Parry
- Manager: Jack Dodds & Ben Sharman
- League: Mid Wales South
- 2024–25: Gwent Central League Division One, 3rd of 8 (league transfer)

Talgarth Town Football Club is a Welsh football team based in Talgarth, Powys, Wales. The team used to play in Central Wales League Southern Division, which is at the fourth tier of the Welsh football league system but for the 2023–24 season dropped to the Gwent Central League Division Two. They play in the Mid Wales South.

== History ==
Football in Talgarth dates back to the late 19th century.

After World War I the club joined the Mid Wales Football League, and later in the Welsh National League's Mid Wales section from 1921 until World War II.

In 1947–48 Talgarth played in the Mid Wales League (South). In 1950 they joined the Brecon and District League, where they stayed until folding in 1962.

Talgarth Town was founded in 1969 as a successor team to Talgarth FC which had disbanded seven years earlier. The 1971–72 season is regarded as the team's most successful season where they were league champions and winners in seven cup finals. They later progressed to the Mid Wales League (North). In 1987–88 they were Mid Wales League (South) champions, and won the Radnorshire Challenge Cup in the next season. The club folded in 1998.

Gwernyfed then represented the town until they renamed to Talgarth Town in 2010, also forming a reserve team named Talgarth Rovers.

== Honours ==
=== Talgarth FC ===
- Mid Wales League (South) – Champions: 1987–88
- Radnorshire Cup – Winners: 1988–89
- Mid Wales League Cup – Runners-up: 1990–91
- Welsh National League (Central Wales) First Division – Runners-up: 1926–27

=== Talgarth Town ===
- Mid Wales League (South) – Champions: 2018–19
- Radnorshire Cup – Finalists: 2009–10; 2013–14
- Brecon & District League – Champions: 1971–72 (unbeaten)
- Brecon & District League – Runners-up: 1970–71
- Brecon and District League Cup – Winners: 1971–72
- Talgarth R.A.F.A. Cup – Winners: 1969–70, 1970–71, 1971–72
- Glasbury Challenge Cup – Winners: 1971–72
- Glasbury Challenge Cup – Finalists 1970–71
- Hay Cup – Winners: 1971–72
- Boughrood Cup – Winners: 1971–72
- John Hando Cup – Winners: 1971–72
- Alfred Sparey Cup, Presteigne – Winners: 1971–72
