= Mid Wales South League =

Mid Wales South Football League
- Country: Wales
- Other club from: England
- Divisions: 1
- Number of clubs: 14
- Level on pyramid: 5
- Promotion to: Central Wales Football League
- Domestic cup: Mid Wales South League Cup
- Current champions: Hay St Marys (2025–26)
- Most championships: Builth Wells/ reserves (11 titles)
- Current: 2026–27

The Mid Wales South League is an association football league, from Mid Wales at the fifth tier of the Welsh football league system.

Teams are eligible to be promoted to the Central Wales Football League if standards and facilities fall into line with the regulations of the Mid Wales League.

The league has sometimes written as the "Mid-Wales League (South)".

In the 2019–20 season, when the season was curtailed due to the coronavirus pandemic, Brecon Corries were champions with a 100% record of 16 wins from 16 games with 143 goals scored and just two conceded. In addition to these statistics the team scored a 27–0 win at Knighton Town Reserves which was expunged from the record books following Knighton's withdrawal from the league.

In 2022–23 season, only five clubs competed in the league, and at the end of the season the league announced it would not return for the following year. The league planned to revive for the 2024–25 season but this did not materialise but in April 2025 the league confirmed they were planning to return for the 2025–26 season. This was confirmed in August 2025 with twelve teams in the revived league.

== Member clubs for 2026–27 season ==
- Brecon
- Builth Wells (reserves)
- Hay St Marys
- Hay St Marys (development)
- Knighton Town (reserves)
- Llandrindod Wells
- Llanidloes Town (reserves)
- Penybont United
- Presteigne St. Andrews
- Presteigne St Andrews (development)
- Radnor Valley (reserves)
- Rhayader Town (reserves)
- St Harmon
- Talgarth Town

== Champions ==
=== 1950s ===
- 1950–51:
- 1951–52:
- 1952–53: Builth Road
- 1953–54: Penybont United
- 1954–55: Penybont United
- 1955–56: Penybont United
- 1956–57: Penybont United
- 1957–58:
- 1958–59:
- 1959–60:

=== 1960s ===
- 1960–61:
- 1961–62:
- 1962–63: Felindre
- 1963–64: Felindre
- 1964–65: Felindre
- 1965–66: Llanidloes Town reserves
- 1966–67: Crossgates
- 1967–68: Builth Wells
- 1968–69: Builth Wells
- 1969–70: Penybont United

=== 1970s ===
- 1970–71: Builth Wells
- 1971–72: Llanidloes Town reserves
- 1972–73: Crossgates
- 1973–74: Presteigne St. Andrews
- 1974–75: Presteigne St. Andrews
- 1975–76: Builth Wells
- 1976–77: Aberystwyth Town reserves
- 1977–78: Builth Wells
- 1978–79: Builth Wells
- 1979–80: Aberystwyth Town reserves

=== 1980s ===
- 1980–81: Aberystwyth Town reserves
- 1981–82: Newtown reserves
- 1982–83: Builth Wells
- 1983–84: Newtown reserves
- 1984–85: Builth Wells
- 1985–86: Builth Wells
- 1986–87: Vale of Arrow (Gladestry)
- 1987–88: Talgarth
- 1988–89: Kington Town (Herefordshire)
- 1989–90: Crickhowell

=== 1990s ===
- 1990–91: Vale of Arrow (Gladestry)
- 1991–92: Vale of Arrow (Gladestry)
- 1992–93: Penybont United
- 1993–94: Sennybridge
- 1994–95: Penybont United
- 1995–96: Vale of Arrow (Gladestry)
- 1996–97: Newcastle on Clun
- 1997–98: Newcastle on Clun
- 1998–99: Sennybridge
- 1999–2000: Sennybridge

=== 2000s ===
- 2000–01: Season abandoned due to Foot & Mouth outbreak, no champion declared
- 2001–02: St Harmon
- 2002–03: Knighton Town
- 2003–04: Knighton Town
- 2004–05: Newbridge-on-Wye
- 2005–06: Rhosgoch Rangers
- 2006–07: Hay St Marys
- 2007–08: Rhayader Town
- 2008–09: Hay St Marys
- 2009–10: Builth Wells

=== 2010s ===
- 2010–11: Rhayader Town reserves
- 2011–12: Newcastle on Clun
- 2012–13: Rhayader Town reserves
- 2013–14: Rhayader Town reserves
- 2014–15: Radnor Valley
- 2015–16: Rhayader Town reserves
- 2016–17: Hay St Marys reserves
- 2017–18: Rhayader Town reserves
- 2018–19: Talgarth Town
- 2019–20: Brecon Corries

=== 2020s ===
- 2020–21: No competition
- 2021–22: Builth Wells reserves
- 2022–23: Newcastle
- 2023–24: No competition
- 2024–25: No competition
- 2025–26: Hay St Marys

=== Number of known titles by winning clubs ===
- Builth Wells/ reserves – 11 titles
- Penybont United – 7 titles
- Rhayader Town/ reserves – 6 titles
- Hay St Marys/ reserves – 4 titles
- Newcastle on Clun – 4 titles
- Vale of Arrow (Gladestry) – 4 titles
- Aberystwyth Town reserves – 3 titles
- Felindre – 3 titles
- Sennybridge – 3 titles
- Crossgates – 2 titles
- Knighton Town – 2 titles
- Llanidloes Town – 2 titles
- Newtown reserves – 2 titles
- Presteigne St. Andrew's – 2 titles
- Talgarth/ Talgarth Town – 2 titles
- Brecon Corries – 1 title
- Crickhowell – 1 title
- Kington Town – 1 title
- Newbridge-on-Wye – 1 title
- Radnor Valley – 1 title
- Rhosgoch Rangers – 1 title
- St Harmon – 1 title

== See also ==
- Football in Wales
- List of football clubs in Wales
