= Builth Wells F.C. =

Association football club in Wales

Coordinates: 52°9′10″N 3°24′47″W

Builth Wells
- Full name: Builth Wells Football Club
- Nickname: The Bulls
- Founded: 1879
- Ground: Lant Fields
- Capacity: 1,000
- Manager: Dylan McPhee
- League: Ardal NE League
- 2025–26: Ardal NE League, 14th of 16

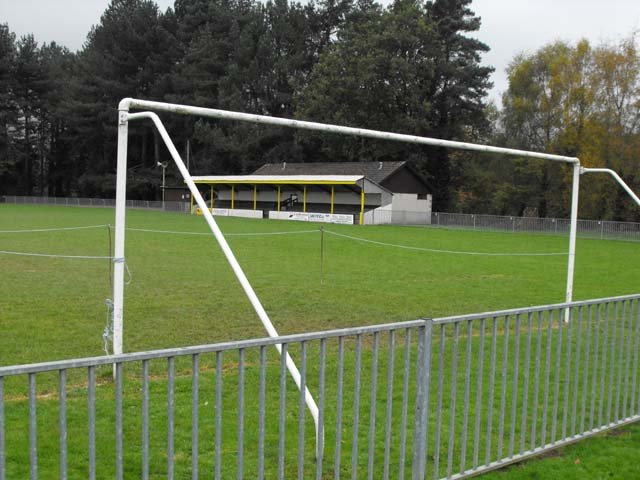
Builth Wells football ground and stand

Builth Wells F.C. is a Welsh football club based in Builth Wells, Powys. They are currently playing in the Ardal NE League. The club is the most successful club in the history of the Mid Wales South Football League, with ten championship wins. The club's reserve team currently plays in this league.

== History ==
The club was formed in 1879.

In 1988-89 the club joined the Mid-Wales League.

In 2000 the club left the –Mid-Wales League.

In 2010-11 the club rejoined Mid-Wales League from the Mid-Wales League (South).

In 2014 the club were relegated to Division Two.

In 2017–18 the club were Mid-Wales League Division Two Champions, and were subsequently promoted to Division One.

For the 2020–21 season the team played in the newly formed Mid Wales League East Division (the fourth tier of the Welsh football pyramid). They finished the season in second place and were subsequently promoted.

In 2022-23 the club will play in the Ardal North East League (the third tier of the Welsh football pyramid).

== Honours ==
- Mid Wales League East – Runners-up: 2021–22
- Mid Wales League Division Two – Champions: 2017–18
- Mid Wales South League – Champions (10): 1967–68; 1968–69; 1970–71; 1975–76; 1977–78; 1978–79; 1982–83; 1984–85; 1985–86; 2009–10
- Mid Wales South League – Runners-up: 1971–72, 1976–77, 1980–81, 1981–82, 1986–87, 1987–88, 2003–04
- J. Emrys Morgan Cup - Winners (1): 1979–80
- Mid Wales League Cup Winners: 2018–19
- Radnorshire Cup – Winners: 1975–76, 1981–82, 1982–83, 1986–87, 1989–90, 2023–24
- Radnorshire Cup – Finalists: 1983–84, 2024–25
