= Hay St Marys F.C. =

Association football club in Wales

Coordinates: 52.070°N 3.127°W

Hay St Marys
- Full name: Hay St Marys Football Club
- Nickname: 'Saints
- Founded: circa. 1889
- Ground: Forest Road; Hay-on-Wye; Powys
- Chairman: Dan Jones
- Manager: Scott Warren(1st Team) Joe O’Hagan, Borja Montejo Moraga (Development)
- League: Mid Wales South
- 2024–25: Central Wales Southern Division, 14th of 17 (league transfer)
Home colours	Away colours

Hay St Marys F.C. are a football club based in Hay-on-Wye. They currently play in the Mid Wales South.

The home colours are green and white striped shirts with green shorts and white socks.

The club plays its home games at 'Forest Road'. The ground boasts two newly built high quality pitches, one with full floodlights and the other with training lights. Both pitches each have permanent dugouts, stands to accommodate the fans and have railings on all four sides.

Hay withdrew from the Mid Wales League South before the 1995–96 season due to a lack of players. They returned to the league in 1997.

In the 2011–12 season, Hay were runners-up in the Mid Wales South League, and were promoted to the Mid Wales League. The 2014–15 season saw the Saints gain promotion again through the runners-up spot, from Division 2 to Division 1 of the Mid Wales League. Along the way they also lifted the Otway Cup in what was a successful season for the club. The 2015–16 season saw the first team finish 4th in Division 1, their highest ever league position under the guidance of former player Gareth Jenkins. 2015–2016 also saw 'The Saint win 'The Radnorshire Cup' and retain 'The Otway Cup'.

At the end of the 2016–17 season, the side took a decision to drop to Division Two, citing players not wishing to travel long distances to away matches.

They started the 2019–20 season in the Mid Wales Football League Division One, but withdrew from the league after seven games.

For the 2021–22 season, the club returned to the Mid Wales Football League in the new East Division.

== Honours ==
- Mid Wales South Football League – Champions: 2006–07, 2008–09, 2016–17 (reserves), 2025–26
- Mid Wales South Football League – Runners-up: 1991–92, 1992–93, 2007–08
- Central Wales Southern Division – Runners–up: 2022–23
- J. Emrys Morgan Cup – Winners: 2008–09
- J. Emrys Morgan Cup – Finalists: 2006–07
- Radnorshire Cup – Winners: 1973–74, 2006–07, 2015–16, 2021–22
- Radnorshire Cup – Finalists: 1968–69, 1977–78, 2001–02, 2010–11, 2011–12
- Otway Cup – Winners: 2012–13, 2014–15, 2015–16
- Herefordshire Senior Amateur Cup – Winners: 1923–24, 1933–34
- Herefordshire Football League Senior Cup – Winners: 1971–72, 1980–81
- Herefordshire County Challenge Cup – Shared Winners: 1973–74
- Hay Cup – Winners: 1973–74
- Herefordshire Football League Division One – Runners-up: 1987–88
- Buith Spa Cup – Winners: 2006–07, 2007–08
- Kington Invitation Cup – Winners: 2006–07
- Brecon Town Cup – Winners: 2007–08
- Ron Ellis Cup – Winners: 2007–08
- Sparey Cup – Winners: 2007–08
- Sparey Cup – Finalists: 2008–09 (reserves)
- Central Wales Senior Cup – Finalists: 2007–08
- Central Wales Cup – Finalists: 2008–09
- Mid Wales South League Cup – Finalists: 2016–17
- Mid Wales South League Cup – Winners: 2022–23 (reserves)
- Hay Challenge Cup – Runners-up: 2025
