= Ledbury Town F.C. =

Coordinates: 52°01′48.13″N 2°25′56.21″W

Ledbury FC
- Full name: Ledbury Football Club
- Nickname: The Friesians
- Founded: 1893
- Ground: New Street, Ledbury
- League: Herefordshire League Premier Division
- 2025–26: Herefordshire League Premier Division, 4th of 14
Home colours	Away colours

Ledbury FC (formerly Ledbury Town Football Club) is a football club based in Ledbury, Herefordshire, England. They are currently members of the Herefordshire League Premier Division and play at New Street.

== History ==
Ledbury Town joined the West Midlands (Regional) League in 1974. Four years later, despite only finishing fifth, they were promoted to the Premier Division ahead of higher placed teams due to the quality of the facilities at their New Street ground. After finishing second from bottom in 1983, they dropped out of the league and played only local football for the next 8 years.

In 1991 they joined the Midland Combination, initially in Division One, but the following season they finished bottom and dropped into Division Two, where they remained until 1999 when they decided to switch leagues and return to the West Midlands (Regional) League, initially in Division One (South). In 2001, despite having one point deducted due to an irregularity, they finished as champions and were promoted to the Premier Division.

A high point in the club's history came in November 2003 when they played Manchester United in a benefit game for a local family who had lost several relatives in a motorway crash. A strong United side ran out 4–2 victors at New Street.

The club pulled out of the West Midlands (Regional) League in late 2014 and closed down completely in January 2015. However, they reformed in summer 2015, and now play in the Herefordshire Football League.

Ledbury Town FC name was changed to Ledbury FC in 2024, in a merger between Ledbury Town Football Club (Adult Football), founded in 1893, and Ledbury Swifts (Youth Football).

== Ground ==
New Street boasts two stands, including a dedicated away seating area, as well as a club house. It backs onto the town's cemetery.

== Honours ==
- West Midlands Regional League
  - Division One Champions: 2000–01
- Herefordshire League
  - Premier Division Champions: 2011–12
- Herefordshire County Challenge Cup
  - Winners: 2006–07, 2009–10
- Herefordshire Charity Bowl
  - Winners: 2011–12, 2018–19, 2022–23

== Records ==
- Best FA Cup performance: Extra preliminary round, 2007–08, 2008–09
- Best FA Vase performance: Fourth Round, 2004–05
