= Wellington F.C. (Herefords) =

Football club based in the village of Wellington, Herefordshire, England

Coordinates: 52°07′40.49″N 2°44′10.58″W

Wellington
- Full name: Wellington Football Club
- Nickname: The Wellies
- Founded: 1968
- Ground: Wellington Playing Fields, Wellington
- Chairman: Phil Smith
- Manager: Gary Stevens
- League: Hellenic League Division One
- 2025–26: Hellenic League Division One, 17th of 18 (relegated)
Home colours	Away colours

Wellington Football Club are a football club based in the village of Wellington, Herefordshire, England. The club is affiliated to the Herefordshire County FA. They were re-formed in 1968. In the 2003–04 season, they reached the third round of the FA Vase. They are currently members of the Hellenic League Division One. They returned to the league in 2024, having resigned before the 2021–22 season. Although officially named simply Wellington F.C., the county in which they play is sometimes appended to their name to differentiate them from the similarly named Wellington A.F.C. based in Somerset.

== History ==
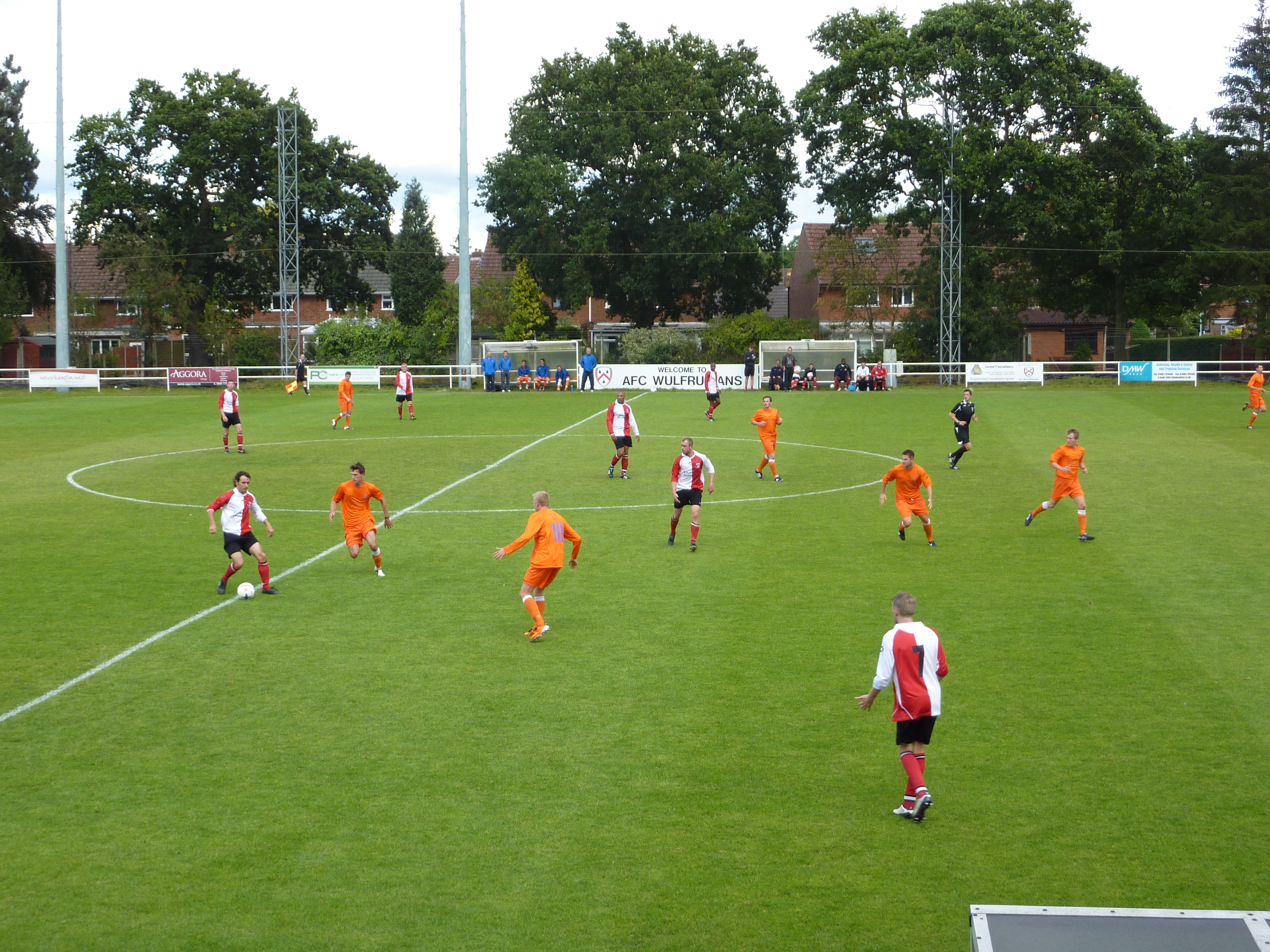
AFC Wulfrunians vs Wellington (Aug 2011)

The club was originally re-formed in 1968 as a youth side, playing on a pitch which had been loaned to them by a local farmer and changing in the village hall. The first league the club entered was Division 3 of the Herefordshire Football League. In 1978 the club moved to a new village playing field and, following the building of new wooden changing rooms in 1981, was invited into the Herefordshire League Premier Division. The club has won the championship of this league on seven occasions, the most recent three times by the reserve team following the promotion up the pyramid of the first team.

In the mid-90s extensive improvement work was carried out on the facilities at the Playing Fields and, following a Herefordshire Premier League and Cup double in 1996–97, the club successfully applied to join the West Midlands (Regional) League. In their second season they finished champions of Division 1 South and also won the League Cup, but were not promoted to the Premier Division as their ground did not yet meet the requirements for that level of football. In 1999–2000 the team finished second and retained the league cup and, following a fund raising drive, further ground improvements were made which allowed the club to be promoted to the Premier Division where they remain to this day, achieving their highest ever finish in the 2004–05 season in 5th place.

In the 2008–09 season the team finally achieved the goal of winning the HFA County Cup, beating Westfields at Hereford United's ground, Edgar Street. In the same season the U18 team won the HFA "Giant Killers" Cup and the Colts team the HFA Junior Cup.

The club have entered the FA Vase since 2002–03, with their best performance coming in 2003–04 when they reached the third round (last 64). In 2007–08 they were accepted into the FA Cup for the first time, beating Coleshill Town after a replay in the Extra-Preliminary Round before losing to Rocester in the preliminary round.

== Club records ==
- Best league performance: 5th in West Midlands (Regional) League Premier Division, 2004–05
- Best FA Cup performance: Preliminary Round, 2007–08
- Best FA Vase performance: 3rd round, 2003–04

== Sources ==
- Wellington at the Football Club History Database
