= Hereford Lads Club F.C. =

Association football club in England

Coordinates: 52.063904°N 2.7203701°W

Hereford Lads Club
- Full name: Hereford Lads Club Football Club
- Nickname: The Blues
- Founded: 1925
- Ground: County Ground, Hereford
- League: Herefordshire League Premier Division

Hereford Lads Club Football Club is a football club based in Hereford, Herefordshire, England. They are currently members of the Herefordshire League Premier Division and play at the County Ground.

== History ==
The club was established in 1925 as a sports club for under-privileged boys, initially focused on boxing and gymnastics. Cricket and football teams were added at a later date. An adult team was later formed and became members of the Herefordshire League. They won the Division One title in 2002–03, earning promotion to the Premier Division. In 2010–11 the club were Premier Division runners-up, and were promoted to Division Two of the West Midlands (Regional) League. They were Division Two runners-up in their first season in the league, and after finishing third in 2012–13, the club were promoted to Division One.

Hereford Lads Club were Division One runners-up in 2015–16, but were denied promotion as they were unable to meet the ground grading criteria. The following season the club reached the final of the Herefordshire County Challenge Cup, in which they lost 3–0 to Hereford. The club were also Division One champions, and were promoted to the Premier Division. They were finalists in the Herefordshire County Challenge Cup again in 2017–18, losing 6–0 to Hereford. At the end of the 2018–19 season the club were transferred to Division One West of the Hellenic League. In 2021 they were promoted to the Premier Division based on their results in the abandoned 2019–20 and 2020–21 seasons.

The club withdrew from the Hellenic League at the end of the 2023–24 season due to financial issues.

== Ground ==
After the original Lads Club building was destroyed by a fire in January 1940, a new club was built next to Widemarsh Common, where the football club's County Ground was developed. From July 2012 the club were forced to play home matches at Hereford Leisure Centre after the West Midlands (Regional) League ruled that the pitch at the county ground was too short. However, they returned to the County Ground in January 2013. A temporary stand was installed in 2016, with a permanent new stand and floodlights erected in 2017; the stand opened by Kevin Sheedy in July prior to a friendly match against Hereford.

== Honours ==
- West Midlands (Regional) League
  - Division One champions 2016–17
- Herefordshire League
  - Division One champions 2002–03

== Records ==
- Best FA Vase performance: First qualifying round, 2017–18

== See also ==
- Hereford Lads Club F.C. players
