= 2019–20 Welsh League Cup =

Nathaniel MG Cup

Tournament details
- Country: Wales; England
- Dates: 2 August 2019 – 1 February 2020
- Teams: 46

Final positions
- Champions: Connah's Quay Nomads (2nd title)
- Runner-up: STM Sports
- All statistics correct as of 15 August 2019.

The 2019–20 Welsh League Cup (known for sponsorship purposes as The Nathaniel MG Cup) was the 28th season of the Welsh League cup competition, which was established in 1992.

Played under a regionalised, knock-out format, the competition is the sixth to be held since the tournament was expanded to include clubs from outside the Cymru Premier. As well as the 12 Cymru Premier clubs from the previous season, every team from the Cymru North and the Cymru South and the wildcard Berriew from the Mid Wales Football League entered. The Premier league teams and the two sides relegated from the top flight, plus the 2nd and 3rd placed teams in each respective Tier 2 league have a bye into the Second Round.

Connah's Quay Nomads defeated STM Sports in the final to win their first League Cup since 1996.

== First round ==
The draw for this round was made on 3 July 2019. On 30 July it was announced that match between Conwy and Bangor would be postponed until further notice pending the outcome of an independent arbitration hearing between Bangor and the Football Association of Wales. The other fixtures were played on the weekend of 2–4 August. Bangor against Conwy was eventually played on 4 September.

=== North ===
Team 1	Score	Team 2
Buckley Town	0–2	Rhyl
Ruthin	0–3	Guilsfield
Prestatyn Town	4–2	Llanrhaeadr
Gresford Athletic	1–0	Colwyn Bay
Conwy Borough	0–1	Bangor City
Llanfair United	3–1	Llangefni Town
Berriew	0–2	Corwen

=== South ===
Team 1	Score	Team 2
Afan Lido	0–1	Cwmbran Celtic
Pontypridd Town	2–3	STM Sports
Undy Athletic	2–2 (a.e.t.) (4–5 p)	Cwmamman United
Swansea University	0–1	Llantwit Major
Goytre United	3–0	Caerau (Ely)
Ammanford	2–1	Penrhyncoch
Briton Ferry Llansawel	3–1	Taffs Well

== Second round ==
The draw for this round was made along with the draw for the previous on 3 July 2019. The matches were played on 9 and 10 August. Bangor City's match against The New Saints was played on 24 September.

=== North ===
Team 1	Score	Team 2
Corwen	0–2	Caernarfon Town
Bala Town	7–0	Gresford Athletic
Rhyl	0–2	Connah's Quay Nomads
Airbus UK Broughton	4–0	Llanfair United
Cefn Druids	1–2	Prestatyn Town
Bangor City	1–1 (a.e.t.) (4–2 p)	The New Saints
Flint Town United	5–1	Portmadog
Guilsfield	1–0	Llandudno

=== South ===
Team 1	Score	Team 2
Cambrian & Clydach Vale B.&G.C.	3–4	Aberystwyth Town
Haverfordwest County	1–1 (a.e.t.) (5–4 p)	Barry Town United
Newtown	2–0	Ammanford
Carmarthen Town	4–1	Cwmamman United
Llanwit Major	1–2	Cardiff Met.
Pen-y-Bont	4–1	Goytre United
Briton Ferry Llansawel A.F.C.	1–1 (a.e.t.) (4–1 p)	Llanelli Town
STM Sports	4–0	Cwmbran Celtic

== Third round ==
Six of the matches were played on 23 and 24 September. SMT vs Haverfordwest was played on 2 October and Bala vs Bangor City was played on 8 October. Defending champions Cardiff Met. were eliminated at this stage.

Team 1	Score	Team 2
Briton Ferry	0–2	Carmarthen Town
STM Sports	1–1 (a.e.t.) (7–6 p)	Haverfordwest County
Guilsfield	1–1 (a.e.t.) (3–5 p)	Connah's Quay Nomads
Cardiff Met.	0–1	Aberystwyth Town
Caernarfon Town	1–4	Prestatyn Town
Flint Town United	2–1	Airbus UK Broughton
Newtown	2–1	Pen-y-Bont
Bala Town	1–1 (a.e.t.) (7–6 p)	Bangor City

== Quarter-final ==
The four ties for the quarter-finals were played on 29 October 2019.

Team 1	Score	Team 2
Newtown	2–2 (a.e.t.) (3–4 p)	STM Sports
Carmarthen Town	0–3	Aberystwyth Town
Connah's Quay Nomads	4–1	Flint Town United
Prestatyn Town	1–2	Bala Town

== Semi-final ==
Both ties in the semi-finals were played on 23 November 2019.

Team 1	Score	Team 2
Connah's Quay Nomads	2–0	Bala Town
STM Sports	2–1	Aberystwyth Town

== Final ==
The final was played on 1 February 2020.

Team 1	Score	Team 2
Connah's Quay Nomads	3–0	STM Sports
