= 2020–21 Cymru South =

Cymru South
- Season: 2020–21

The 2020–21 Cymru South season (also known as the 2020–21 JD Cymru South season for sponsorship reasons) would have been the second season of the second-tier Southern region football in Welsh football pyramid. Teams were play each other twice on a home and away basis.

Swansea University were the defending champions. They were not promoted last season because they did not meet FAW tier 1 guidelines. Second placed Haverfordwest County were promoted instead. Because of the COVID-19 pandemic in Wales, this season was cancelled.

== Teams ==
The league consists of 16 clubs.

=== Team changes ===
==== To Cymru South ====
Promoted from Welsh Football League Division One

- Trefelin BGC
- Port Talbot Town
- Risca United

Relegated from Cymru Premier

- Carmarthen Town

==== From Cymru South ====
Promoted to Cymru Premier

- Haverfordwest County

Relegated to Ardal SW

- STM Sports
- Cwmamman United
- Caerau (Ely)

=== Stadia and Locations ===
Locations of the 2020–21 Cymru South teams

| Team | Home City | Home Ground |
|---|---|---|
| Afan Lido | Aberavon, Port Talbot | Marston's Stadium |
| Ammanford | Ammanford | Recreation Ground |
| Briton Ferry Llansawel | Briton Ferry | Old Road |
| Cambrian & Clydach Vale B.G.C. | Clydach Vale | King George V New Field |
| Carmarthen Town | Carmarthen | Richmond Park |
| Cwmbran Celtic | Cwmbran | Celtic Park |
| Goytre United | Goytre, Port Talbot | Glenhafod Park Stadium |
| Llanelli Town | Llanelli | Stebonheath Park |
| Llantwit Major | Llantwit Major | Frampton Lane |
| Pontypridd Town | Aberdare | Aberaman Park |
| Port Talbot Town | Aberavon, Port Talbot | The Remax Stadium |
| Risca United | Llanfabon | CCB Centre For Sporting Excellence |
| Swansea University | Swansea | Sketty Lane |
| Taff's Well | Taff's Well | Rhiw'r Ddar |
| Trefelin BGC | Velindre, Port Talbot | Ynys Park |
| Undy Athletic | Undy | The Causeway |

Source: footballgroundmap.com Cymru South Ground Information

== Season overview ==
The Professional Registration Periods for the 2020–21 season were as follows: The first period was to open on 27 July 2020 and was to close at midnight on 16 October 2020. Dates for the second period were to be confirmed prior to the season's cancellation. Past Summer transfers can be found here.

Since anti-COVID-19 restrictions were put in place by FAW, as from Monday 10 August 2020, clubs could have trained in groups of 15 and contact training was allowed at all-levels of football. However, competitive and exhibition matches were still not allowed to take place. The FAW eventually cancelled the 2020–21 season on 18 March 2021 because Cymru North and South did not have their Elite Status designation reinstated by the National Sport Group.

== League table ==
| Pos | Team | Pld | W | D | L | GF | GA | GD | Pts |
|---|---|---|---|---|---|---|---|---|---|
| 1 | Afan Lido | 0 | 0 | 0 | 0 | 0 | 0 | 0 | 0 |
| 2 | Ammanford | 0 | 0 | 0 | 0 | 0 | 0 | 0 | 0 |
| 3 | Briton Ferry Llansawel | 0 | 0 | 0 | 0 | 0 | 0 | 0 | 0 |
| 4 | Cambrian & Clydach Vale BGC | 0 | 0 | 0 | 0 | 0 | 0 | 0 | 0 |
| 5 | Carmarthen Town | 0 | 0 | 0 | 0 | 0 | 0 | 0 | 0 |
| 6 | Cwmbran Celtic | 0 | 0 | 0 | 0 | 0 | 0 | 0 | 0 |
| 7 | Goytre United | 0 | 0 | 0 | 0 | 0 | 0 | 0 | 0 |
| 8 | Llanelli Town | 0 | 0 | 0 | 0 | 0 | 0 | 0 | 0 |
| 9 | Llantwit Major | 0 | 0 | 0 | 0 | 0 | 0 | 0 | 0 |
| 10 | Pontypridd Town | 0 | 0 | 0 | 0 | 0 | 0 | 0 | 0 |
| 11 | Port Talbot Town | 0 | 0 | 0 | 0 | 0 | 0 | 0 | 0 |
| 12 | Risca United | 0 | 0 | 0 | 0 | 0 | 0 | 0 | 0 |
| 13 | Swansea University | 0 | 0 | 0 | 0 | 0 | 0 | 0 | 0 |
| 14 | Taff's Well | 0 | 0 | 0 | 0 | 0 | 0 | 0 | 0 |
| 15 | Trefelin BGC | 0 | 0 | 0 | 0 | 0 | 0 | 0 | 0 |
| 16 | Undy Athletic | 0 | 0 | 0 | 0 | 0 | 0 | 0 | 0 |

Source: Cymru South League Table
Rules for classification: 1) Points; 2) Goal difference; 3) Goals scored; 4) Matches won; 5) Play-off.

== Results ==
| Home \ Away | AFL | AMM | BFL | CCV | CAR | CBC | GOU | LLI | LTM | PPT | PTT | RIS | SWU | TAW | TRE | UNA |
|---|---|---|---|---|---|---|---|---|---|---|---|---|---|---|---|---|
| Afan Lido | — | | | | | | | | | | | | | | | |
| Ammanford | | — | | | | | | | | | | | | | | |
| Briton Ferry Llansawel | | | — | | | | | | | | | | | | | |
| Cambrian & Clydach Vale BGC | | | | — | | | | | | | | | | | | |
| Carmarthen Town | | | | | — | | | | | | | | | | | |
| Cwmbran Celtic | | | | | | — | | | | | | | | | | |
| Goytre United | | | | | | | — | | | | | | | | | |
| Llanelli Town | | | | | | | | — | | | | | | | | |
| Llantwit Major | | | | | | | | | — | | | | | | | |
| Pontypridd Town | | | | | | | | | | — | | | | | | |
| Port Talbot Town | | | | | | | | | | | — | | | | | |
| Risca United | | | | | | | | | | | | — | | | | |
| Swansea University | | | | | | | | | | | | | — | | | |
| Taff's Well | | | | | | | | | | | | | | — | | |
| Trefelin BGC | | | | | | | | | | | | | | | — | |
| Undy Athletic | | | | | | | | | | | | | | | | — |

Source: Cymru South Match Results
Legend: Blue = home team win; Yellow = draw; Red = away team win.

== Season statistics ==
=== Top scorers ===
| Season | Player | Club | Goals | Notes |
|---|---|---|---|---|
| 2019-20 | None | | | (League cancelled 18 March 2021 due to COVID-19 pandemic) |

=== League placing ===
| Season | Champions | Runner-up | Third place | Relegated teams |

=== Fair Play winner ===
The winner for each respective division's FAW Fair Play Table will be given £1,000 prize money and the FAW Fair Play Trophy.

| Season | Club |
|---|---|
| 2020-21 | None |
