= 2021–22 Cymru South =

Third season of the second-tier Southern region football in Welsh football pyramid

Cymru South
- Season: 2021–22
- Champions: Llantwit Major
- Promoted: Pontypridd Town
- Relegated: Port Talbot Town; Undy Athletic; Risca United
- Matches: 232
- Goals: 820 (3.53 per match)
- Biggest home win: Pontypridd Town 8–0 Port Talbot (21 August 2021)
- Biggest away win: Port Talbot 0–7 Briton Ferry Llansawel (31 July 2021); Undy Athletic 1–8 Ammanford (21 August 2021)
- Highest scoring: Undy Athletic 1–8 Ammanford (21 August 2021)

The 2021–22 Cymru South season (also known as the 2021–22 JD Cymru South season for sponsorship reasons) was the third season of the second-tier Southern region football in Welsh football pyramid. Teams will play each other twice on a home and away basis.

Swansea University were the defending champions from the 2019–20 season, following the curtailment of the 2020–21 season.

Pre-season favourites Ammanford AFC endured a season of struggle, with a three way title race for much of the season between Briton Ferry, Pontypridd Town AFC, and Llantwit Major AFC. After all three clubs lead at some point, Llantwit Major put together an outstanding finish to the season, winning 11 games out of 12 to lift the trophy with a game to spare. Pontypridd finished 2nd, and were promoted after Llantwit were controversially denied a Tier 1 license.

== Teams ==
The league consists of 16 clubs.

=== Stadia and Locations ===
Locations of the 2021–22 Cymru South teams

Team	Home City	Home Ground
Afan Lido	Aberavon, Port Talbot	Marston's Stadium
Ammanford	Ammanford	Recreation Ground
Briton Ferry Llansawel	Briton Ferry	Old Road
Cambrian & Clydach Vale B.G.C.	Clydach Vale	King George V New Field
Carmarthen Town	Carmarthen	Richmond Park
Cwmbran Celtic	Cwmbran	Celtic Park
Goytre United	Goytre, Port Talbot	Glenhafod Park Stadium
Llanelli Town	Llanelli	Stebonheath Park
Llantwit Major	Llantwit Major	Windmill Ground
Pontypridd Town	Aberdare	USW Sports Park
Port Talbot Town	Aberavon, Port Talbot	The Remax Stadium
Risca United	Llanfabon	CCB Centre For Sporting Excellence
Swansea University	Swansea	Sketty Lane
Taff's Well	Taff's Well	Rhiw'r Ddar
Trefelin BGC	Velindre, Port Talbot	Ynys Park
Undy Athletic	Undy	The Causeway

Source: |footballgroundmap.com Cymru South Ground Information

=== Personnel and kits ===
Team	Head coach	Captain	Kit manufacturer	Front shirt sponsor
Afan Lido	(Wales) Paul Evans	(Wales) Matthew Beynon		
Ammanford	(Wales) Gruff Harrison	(England) Lee Trundle		
Briton Ferry Llansawel	(Wales) Andy Hill	(Wales) Mark Jones		
Cambrian & Clydach	(Wales) Scott Young	(Wales) Jarrad Wright		
Carmarthen Town	(Wales) Sean Cresser	(Wales) Greg Walters		
Cwmbran Celtic	(Wales) James Kinsella	(Wales) Lewis Watkins		
Goytre United	(Wales) Mark Pike	(Wales) Josef Hopkins		
Llanelli Town	(Wales) Lee John	(Wales) Louis Gerrard		
Llantwit Major	(Wales) Karl Lewis	(Wales) Cullen Kinsella		
Pontypridd Town	(Wales) Jonathan Jones	(England) Gavin Beddard		
Port Talbot Town	(Wales) Conor McGarhan	(Wales) Nathaniel James		
Risca United	(Wales) Simon Berry	(Wales) Josh Clayton		
Swansea University	(Wales) Wyn Thomas	(Wales) Adam Orme		
Taff's Well	(Wales) Craig Sampson	(Wales) Marcus Jones		
Trefelin B.G.C.	(Wales) Richie Ryan	(Wales) Ceri Williams		
Undy Athletic	(Wales) Mark Crook	(Wales) Chris Parry		

=== Managerial changes ===
Team	Outgoing manager	Manner of departure	Date of vacancy	Position in table	Incoming manager	Date of appointment
Port Talbot Town	(Wales) Mark Pike	Resigned	16 July 2021	Pre-season	(Wales) Sam O'Sullivan	23 August 2021
Carmarthen Town	(Wales) Kristian O'Leary	Signed by Swansea U23	24 July 2021	8th	(Wales) Sean Cresser	24 July 2021
Llanelli Town	(Wales) Andy Legg	Fired	25 November 2021	6th	(Wales) Lee John	28 November 2021
Goytre United	(Wales) Lee John	Signed by Llanelli Town	28 November 2021	4th	(Wales) Mark Pike	12 December 2021
Port Talbot Town	(Wales) Sam O'Sullivan	Fired	16 February 2022	16th	(Wales) Conor McGarhan	16 February 2022
Carmarthen Town	(Wales) Sean Cresser	Resigned	23 April 2022	4th	(Wales) Mark Aizlewood	24 April 2022

== League table ==
Pos	Team	Pld	W	D	L	GF	GA	GD	Pts	Promotion or relegation
1	Llantwit Major (C)	30	24	2	4	73	31	+42	74	
2	Pontypridd Town (P)	30	21	6	3	79	30	+49	69	Promotion to Cymru Premier
3	Briton Ferry Llansawel	30	17	5	8	76	36	+40	56	
4	Cambrian & Clydach Vale BGC	30	15	6	9	73	42	+31	51	
5	Carmarthen Town	30	15	9	6	52	25	+27	51 (Note: The match between Carmarthen and Risca on 31 July 2021 was cancelled due to COVID-19 cases in Carmarthen. However, it was later deemed that Carmarthen had sufficient players to fulfil the fixture in line with the league's policy, and were therefore deducted 3 points and fined £1,000.)	
6	Goytre United	30	15	6	9	55	36	+19	51	
7	Taff's Well	30	14	7	9	57	47	+10	49	
8	Swansea University	30	11	7	12	44	43	+1	40	
9	Llanelli Town	30	11	7	12	43	54	−11	40	
10	Afan Lido	30	12	3	15	45	67	−22	39	
11	Trefelin BGC	30	9	10	11	58	51	+7	37	
12	Ammanford	30	10	4	16	58	56	+2	34	
13	Cwmbran Celtic	30	10	4	16	43	74	−31	34	
14	Risca United (R)	30	7	10	13	43	51	−8	31	Relegation to Ardal SE or Ardal SW
15	Undy Athletic (R)	30	5	2	23	41	84	−43	17	Relegation to Ardal SE or Ardal SW
16	Port Talbot Town (R)	30	0	0	30	8	121	−113	0	Relegation to Ardal SE or Ardal SW

Source: Cymru South League Table
Rules for classification: 1) Points; 2) Goal difference; 3) Goals scored; 4) Matches won; 5) Play-off.
(C) Champions; (P) Promoted; (R) Relegated

== Results ==
Home \ Away	LTM	PPT	GOU	BFL	CCV	CAR	TAW	SWU	LLI	AFL	RIS	TRE	AMM	CBC	UNA	PTT
Llantwit Major	—	3–1	2–1	0–1	2–1	1–0	4–2	0–2	3–0	3–0	2–0	2–1	1–1	2–0	2–0	6–0
Pontypridd Town	4–0	—	1–3	0–0	2–1	1–1	4–3	1–1	4–1	8–1	2–1	2–1	4–0	3–0	5–1	8–0
Goytre United	2–4	0–1	—	3–1	3–0	1–1	0–2	2–1	3–0	2–2	1–1	1–2	3–0	4–0	2–1	6–1
Briton Ferry Llansawel	3–4	0–0	2–1	—	3–2	1–1	5–0	3–0	0–1	1–2	3–1	3–1	1–0	6–0	4–0	2–1
Cambrian & Clydach Vale BGC	3–3	1–2	4–1	3–0	—	1–1	5–2	0–0	1–0	5–0	5–0	2–2	3–0	4–1	3–0	5–0
Carmarthen Town	0–1	0–2	1–4	1–1	3–1	—	0–0	2–0	3–1	4–0	1–0	1–1	4–0	3–0	4–0	3–0
Taff's Well	1–4	1–3	0–1	2–1	1–1	2–0	—	4–2	2–1	2–1	1–3	1–1	0–1	3–3	3–0	7–1
Swansea University	3–0	3–4	0–1	1–3	0–2	0–1	1–2	—	2–2	2–0	2–2	3–3	2–1	3–1	2–1	4–0
Llanelli Town	1–2	0–4	3–1	0–4	3–2	2–0	1–1	1–1	—	1–1	1–1	3–3	0–3	2–0	2–3	1–0
Afan Lido	0–1	3–2	1–2	1–6	1–1	0–4	1–5	0–3	1–2	—	2–1	1–3	0–1	5–2	4–2	2–0
Risca United	0–2	0–1	1–1	2–5	0–2	1–1	1–1	4–0	1–1	2–3	—	0–2	2–1	1–1	3–0	7–0
Trefelin BGC	2–5	2–2	11–1	2–2	4–1	0–2	0–0	0–2	0–1	1–2	4–0	—	1–1	3–4	4–1	4–0
Ammanford	1–3	0–2	0–1	4–3	3–4	1–3	2–4	0–0	5–0	1–2	2–2	5–3	—	2–3	5–2	3–0
Cwmbran Celtic	0–5	1–2	1–0	3–1	3–1	1–1	0–3	0–1	2–4	0–5	3–3	2–1	1–0	—	1–2	2–1
Undy Athletic	1–3	2–2	1–1	0–4	2–3	2–3	0–1	3–1	1–2	0–2	1–2	1–2	1–8	3–4	—	5–2
Port Talbot Town	0–3	0–2	1–3	0–7	0–6	0–3	0–1	0–2	0–6	0–2	0–1	0–4	1–7	0–4	0–5	—

Updated to match(es) played on 22 April 2022. Source: Cymru South Match Results
Legend: Blue = home team win; Yellow = draw; Red = away team win.

== Season statistics ==
=== Top scorers ===
Rank	Player	Club	Goals
1	(Wales) Tom Walters	Llantwit Major	24
2	(Wales) Tristan Jenkins	Ammanford	21
3	(Wales) Liam Thomas	Carmarthen Town	19
3	(Wales) Sam Johnson	Pontypridd Town	19
5	(Wales) Tyler Brock	Briton Ferry Llansawel	15
5	(Wales) David Lyon	Taffs Well	15

=== Monthly awards ===
Month	Manager of the Month		Player of the Month	
Month	Manager	Club	Player	Club
August	Karl Lewis	Llantwit Major	Conner Goldsworthy	Llantwit Major
September	Karl Lewis	Llantwit Major	Tom Walters	Llantwit Major
October	Jonathan Jones	Pontypridd Town	Tom Walters	Llantwit Major
November	Paul Evans	Afan Lido	Tristan Jenkins	Ammanford
December	Sean Cresser	Carmarthen Town	David Lyon	Taff's Well
January	Karl Lewis	Llantwit Major	Conner Goldsworthy	Llantwit Major

=== Fair Play award ===
The winner for each respective division's FAW Fair Play Table was to be given £1,000 prize money and the FAW Fair Play Trophy.

The winners of the Nationwide Building Society Fair Play Award for the 2021-2022 Cymru South season are Swansea University
