= Cymru Leagues =

- Founded: 2019
- Country: Wales
- Number of clubs: 44
- Level on pyramid: 1 and 2
- Relegation to: Ardal Leagues
- Domestic cup(s): Welsh FA Cup; Welsh League Cup
- Website: cymrufootball.wales

The Cymru Leagues is an umbrella name for the top two tiers of the Welsh football league system. It consists of the Cymru Premier at Tier 1, as well as the Cymru North and Cymru South at the second tier.

== Tier 1 ==
The Cymru Premier is the national football league of Wales. It has both professional and semi-professional status clubs and is at the top of the Welsh football league system. Prior to 2002, the league was known as the League of Wales (LoW), but changed its name as part of a sponsorship deal to the Welsh Premier League. The league has been rebranded as the Cymru Premier for the 2019–20 season.

== Tier 2 ==
The Cymru North and Cymru South are the two football leagues in Wales that form the second level of the Welsh football league system. They have semi-professional status clubs. The first year of their operation was 2019–20, with the Football Association of Wales owning and administering the Tier 2 leagues for the first time. These changes followed from a review of the Welsh Football Pyramid, where the Tier 2 was called the FAW Championship

The tier is split regionally, with the Cymru North covering clubs playing in northern Wales, and the Cymru South covering clubs playing in southern Wales. The winners of each division are eligible for promotion to the Cymru Premier, subject to the clubs meeting FAW criteria for Tier 1 grounds, playing facilities and financial operations.

Relegation from the Cymru North is to three regional based Tier 3 leagues: the Welsh National League (Wrexham Area), the Welsh Alliance League and the Mid Wales Football League. The Cymru South has relegation to the Tier 3 Welsh Football League Division One.

52 teams applied for Tier 2 certification, with teams assessed against a number of infrastructure criteria, including: safety policy and evacuation plan, covered seating, pitch dimensions, dressing room & sanitary facilities. Following the meeting of the FAW's first decision body, 43 clubs were successful in gaining Tier 2 certification.

== Member clubs for 2022–23 season ==
Locations of teams in the 2022–23 season
– Cymru Premier – Cymru North – Cymru South

The clubs for the second season were as follows:

=== Cymru Premier ===
The Cymru Premier is a twelve-club league.

- Aberystwyth Town
- Bala Town
- Barry Town United F.C
- Caernarfon Town
- Cardiff Metropolitan University
- Colwyn Bay
- Connah's Quay Nomads
- Haverfordwest County
- Newtown
- Pen-y-Bont
- Pontypridd Town
- The New Saints

=== Cymru North ===
The Cymru North is a sixteen-club league.

- Airbus UK Broughton
- Bangor 1876
- Buckley Town
- Caersws
- Chirk AAA
- Denbigh
- Flint Town United
- Gresford Athletic
- Guilsfield
- Holywell Town
- Llandudno
- Llanidloes Town
- Mold Alexandra
- Porthmadog
- Prestatyn Town
- Ruthin

=== Cymru South ===
The Cymru South is a sixteen-club league.

- Afan Lido
- Ammanford
- Abergavenny Town
- Baglan Dragons
- Briton Ferry Llansawel
- Caerau (Ely)
- Cambrian & Clydach Vale
- Carmarthen Town
- Cwmbran Celtic
- Goytre United
- Llanelli Town
- Llantwit Major
- Pontardawe Town
- Taffs Well
- Trefelin BGC

== Relegation (historical) ==
Teams relegated from the Cymru North and the Cymru South at the end of the 2019–20 season dropped to the newly-established Ardal Leagues which operated for the first time in the 2021–22 season.

The bottom three teams from each of the tier 2 leagues were relegated.

== See also ==
- List of association football competitions
- Welsh Football League
- Cymru Alliance
