= 2025–26 Welsh League Cup =

Nathaniel MG Cup

Tournament details
- Country: Wales
- Dates: 18 July 2025 – 28 February 2026
- Teams: 44

Final positions
- Champions: Barry Town United (5th title)
- Runners-up: The New Saints

The 2025–26 Welsh League Cup (known for sponsorship purposes as The Nathaniel MG Cup) was the 34th season of the Welsh League Cup competition, which was established in 1992.

Barry Town United beat the defending champions The New Saints in the final by 2–0 to win their first title since 2000.

== Format ==
- 44 clubs in the Cymru Premier, Cymru North and Cymru South leagues entered the season's League Cup.
- Cardiff City and Swansea City also competed as wildcard entries.
- All Cymru Premier sides received a bye into the second round, alongside second tier sides Newtown, Airbus UK Broughton, Holywell Town and Llandudno from the Cymru North and Aberystwyth Town and Trethomas Bluebirds from the Cymru South.

== First round ==
The draws for the first and second rounds were made on 25 June 2025.

=== Northern ===
Home team	Score	Away team
18 July 2025
Buckley Town	4–0	Holyhead Hotspur
Ruthin Town	0–0 (4–2 p)	Penrhyncoch
Flint Mountain	1–3	Denbigh Town
Guilsfield	3–0	Mold Alexandra
19 July 2025
Rhyl 1879	2–1	Caersws
Gresford Athletic	3–0	Brickfield Rangers

=== Southern ===
Home team	Score	Away team
18 July 2025
Pontypridd United	0–0 (4–2 p)	Cwmbran Celtic
Caerau (Ely)	3–4	Trefelin
19 July 2025
Ammanford	0–0 (0–3 p)	Cardiff City U21s
Cambrian United	2–2 (3–1 p)	Treowen Stars
Carmarthen Town	1–4	Swansea City U21s
Ynyshir Albions	4–1	Cardiff Draconians
Llantwit Major	1–2	Afan Lido
20 July 2025
Newport City	2–0	Baglan Dragons

== Second round ==
=== Northern ===
Home team	Score	Away team
Caernarfon Town	3–0	Colwyn Bay
Llandudno	7–0	Gresford Athletic
Ruthin Town	0–9	Connah’s Quay Nomads
Buckley Town	2–3	Newtown
Guilsfield	2–2 (1–3 p)	Bala Town
Flint Town United	1–2	Holywell Town
The New Saints	7–1	Airbus UK Broughton
Rhyl 1879	2–2 (10–11 p)	Denbigh Town

=== Southern ===
Home team	Score	Away team
Cardiff City U21s	0–2	Cambrian United
Barry Town United	2–1	Aberystwyth Town
Briton Ferry Llansawel	3–0	Trethomas Bluebirds
Afan Lido	0–5	Swansea City U21s
Ynyshir Albions	1–4	Llanelli Town
Haverfordwest County	5–0	Newport City
Trefelin	1–6	Penybont
Cardiff MU	4–0	Pontypridd United

== Third round ==
The draw for the third round was made on 7 August 2025.

=== Northern ===
Home team	Score	Away team
10 September 2025
Caernarfon Town	2–2 (4–3 p)	Holywell Town
Connah’s Quay Nomads	1–3	The New Saints
Newtown	1–1 (5–4 p)	Bala Town
16 September 2025
Llandudno	3–1	Denbigh Town

=== Southern ===
Home team	Score	Away team
10 September 2025
Barry Town United	1–0	Llanelli Town
Cambrian United	1–1 (3–2 p)	Cardiff MU
Haverfordwest County	4–1	Swansea City U21s
Penybont	2–2 (3–4 p)	Briton Ferry Llansawel

== Quarter-finals ==
The draw for the quarter-finals was made on 15 September 2025.

=== Northern ===
Home team	Score	Away team
4 November 2025
Newtown	3–6	Llandudno
The New Saints	3–0	Caernarfon Town

=== Southern ===
Home team	Score	Away team
4 November 2025
Cambrian United	1–0	Briton Ferry Llansawel
Haverfordwest County	0–2	Barry Town United

== Semi-finals ==
The draw for the semi-finals took place on 10 November 2025. Each team's ball number was decided by a go-kart race between former professional footballers Joe Ledley, Danny Gabbidon, Andy Legg and Scott Young. Each driver randomly chose a team to represent in the race, and that driver's position was given as the ball number. A normal draw was held after the race. The semi-finals were played on 6 December 2025.

Home team	Score	Away team
6 December 2025
The New Saints	2–1	Llandudno
Cambrian United	0–3	Barry Town United

== Final ==
28 February 2026
17:30

The New Saints	0–2	Barry Town United
		Owen 43', 90+1'

DragonBet Stadium, Bridgend
Attendance: 1,223
Referee: Rob Jenkins

== Season statistics ==
=== Hat-trick ===
As of 2 August 2025

Player	For	Against	Result	Date
(England) Mark Cadwallader	Llandudno	Gresford Athletic	7–0 (H)	2 August 2025

Notes

(H) – Home team
(A) – Away team
