= Kai Whitmore =

Welsh footballer (born 2001)

Personal information
- Full name: Kai Rees William Whitmore
- Date of birth: 25 March 2001 (age 25)
- Place of birth: Neath Port Talbot, Wales
- Height: 1.81 m (5 ft 11 in)
- Position: Midfielder

Team information
- Current team: Young Lions
- Number: 8

Youth career
- Swansea City

Senior career*
Years	Team	Apps	(Gls)
2021–2022	Ammanford	11	(3)
2022–2023	Penybont	44	(2)
2023–2024	Haverfordwest County	27	(4)
2024–2026	Newport County	44	(5)
2026–	Young Lions	0	(0)
- * Club domestic league appearances and goals as of 15:56, 2 February 2026 (UTC)

Kai Rees William Whitmore (born 25 March 2001) is a Welsh professional footballer who plays as a midfielder for Singapore Premier League club Young Lions.

== Club career ==
=== Youth career ===
Whitmore began his footballing journey at a young age coming through the Swansea City academy.

=== Ammanford ===
Whitmore made his senior debut for Cymru South club Ammanford in the 2021–22 season on 23 July 2021 against Llanelli Town in a 3–0 win. He scored his Ammanford goal in a 8–1 win over Undy Athletic on 21 August 2021. Whitemore scored 3 goals and contribute 1 assist in 12 appearances across all competition in his debut season.

=== Penybont ===
On 12 January 2022, Whitmore moved to Cymru Premier club Penybont for the remainder of the 2021–22 season. In the 2022–23 season, Whitmore played a key role in their impressive campaign, featuring in all 32 league games. He helped the club secure a top-three finish, which earned them a spot in the qualification for the Europa Conference League first qualifying round. Whitmore also played in the 2021–22 Welsh Cup final. The game ended in a 2–3 lost, with the victory going to The New Saints.

=== Haverfordwest County ===
In May 2023 Whitmore joined Cymru Premier club Haverfordwest County. At Haverfordwest County, Whitmore continued to shine under the guidance of Tony Pennock. He scored a brace in a 3–0 win over Aberystwyth Town on 30 September. Whitmore played a crucial role in their 2023–24 UEFA Conference League qualification campaign. He featured in all 4 of the 2 two-legged match against Shkëndija and B36 Tórshavn. In total, Whitmore made 32 appearances across all competitions for Haverfordwest, scoring four goals.

=== Newport County ===
In June 2024, Whitmore joined EFL League Two side Newport County. He made his debut for Newport on 10 August in the 3–2 league defeat to Cheltenham Town. In the next match on 17 August, Whitmore scored his first goal for the club in the 3–1 win against Doncaster Rovers.

On 25 October 2025, Whitmore recorded three assists in a 3–0 away win over Harrogate Town. On 8 November, Whitmore scored the opening goal, a top corner screamer, as Newport fell to a 2–4 home defeat against Walsall. On 10 December, he assisted Cameron Antwi, who scored a stoppage time equaliser against Crewe Alexandra to bring the match to a 2–2 draw. On 2 February 2026, Whitmore departed the club by mutual consent.

=== Young Lions ===
On 14 April 2026, Whitmore signed with Singapore Premier League side Young Lions, a developmental club managed by the Football Association of Singapore (FAS). As the transfer took place outside the league's registration window, he was not eligible to feature for the remainder of the 2025–26 season but rather the following 2026–27 season.

== International career ==
Whitmore is eligible to play for the Singapore national team through his grandfather who was born in Singapore in 1961 at the old Changi Hospital. Whitmore also expressed his interest in June 2025 to represent the Singapore national team and has contacted FAS on the process.

== Career statistics ==
=== Club ===
As of match played 1 January 2026

Appearances and goals by club, season and competition
Club	Season	League			National cup (Note: Includes FA Cup, Welsh Cup)		League cup (Note: Includes EFL Cup, Welsh League Cup)		Europe		Other		Total	
Club	Season	Division	Apps	Goals	Apps	Goals	Apps	Goals	Apps	Goals	Apps	Goals	Apps	Goals
Ammanford	2021–22	Cymru South	11	3	1	0	1	0	—		—		13	3
Penybont	2021–22	Cymru Premier	12	0	3	0	0	0	—		—		15	0
Penybont	2022–23	Cymru Premier	32	2	3	0	1	0	—		—		36	2
Penybont	Total		44	2	6	0	1	0	0	0	0	0	51	2
Haverfordwest County	2023–24	Cymru Premier	27	4	1	0	0	0	4 (Note: Appearances in UEFA Europa Conference League qualifying)	0	—		32	4
Newport County	2024–25	League Two	28	2	1	1	1	0	—		1 (Note: Appearances in EFL Trophy)	0	31	3
Newport County	2025–26	League Two	16	3	2	1	1	0	—		1	0	20	4
Newport County	Total		44	5	3	2	2	0	0	0	2	0	51	7
Career total			126	14	11	2	4	0	4	0	2	0	147	16

== Honours ==
Penybont

- Welsh Cup runner-up: 2021–22
