= 2026–27 Cymru Premier =

Welsh football season

Cymru Premier Uwch Gynghrair Cymru
- Season: 2026–27
- Dates: 31 July 2026 – TBD 2027
- All statistics correct as of 02/07/2026, 16:45 BST.

The 2026–27 Cymru Premier (Welsh: Uwch Gynghrair Cymru; known as the Novira Cymru Premier for sponsorship reasons) is the 35th season of the Cymru Premier (formerly known as the Welsh Premier League), the highest men's football league within Wales since its establishment in 1992. It is notable as the first season to use VAR (video assistant referee) following a Football Association of Wales plan to increase the profile of the league, and for the first time, non-televised games being played on Friday evenings instead of Saturday afternoon.

== Teams ==
The league consisted of 16 teams for the first time; the top 10 teams from the previous season, 3 teams promoted from the Cymru North, and 3 teams promoted from the Cymru South. The New Saints entered the season as the defending champions (for the fifth consecutive season).

=== Team changes ===
The following teams changed division since the 2025–26 season.

To Cymru Premier
▲ Promoted from Cymru North
- Llandudno
- Airbus UK Broughton
- Holywell Town
▲ Promoted from Cymru South
- Trefelin BGC
- Cambrian United
- Ammanford

From Cymru Premier
▼ Relegated to Cymru North
- Bala Town
▼ Relegated to Cymru South
- Llanelli Town

The promoted teams were the 2025–26 Cymru North champions Llandudno, the 2025–26 Cymru South champions Trefelin BGC, Cymru North runners-up Airbus UK Broughton, Cymru South runners-up Cambrian United, Cymru North third-placed team Holywell Town, and Cymru South third-placed team Ammanford. Llandudno returned to the Cymru Premier after seven years, Airbus UK Broughton after three years, and Holywell Town after twenty-seven years; Trefelin BGC, Cambrian United, and Ammanford all marked their debuts in the Cymru Premier. They replaced the 2025–26 Cymru Premier bottom two teams Bala Town and Llanelli Town (relegated from the Cymru Premier after seventeen years and one year respectively).

=== Stadiums and locations ===
Locations of teams in the 2026–27 Cymru Premier.
Locations of teams in the 2026–27 Cymru Premier from Flintshire.

Team	Location	Stadium	Capacity	2025-26 season
Airbus UK Broughton^{↑}	Broughton	The Airfield	1,600	2nd in Cymru North
Ammanford^{↑}	Ammanford	The Recreation Ground	1,000	3rd in Cymru South
Barry Town United	Barry	Jenner Park	2,650	3rd in Cymru Premier
Briton Ferry Llansawel	Briton Ferry	Old Road	2,300	8th in Cymru Premier
Caernarfon Town	Caernarfon	The Oval	3,000	4th in Cymru Premier
Cambrian United^{↑}	Clydach Vale	M&P Group 3G	1,000	2nd in Cymru South
Cardiff Met	Cyncoed	Cyncoed Campus	1,620	9th in Cymru Premier
Colwyn Bay	Old Colwyn	Llanelian Road	3,000	5th in Cymru Premier
Connah's Quay Nomads	Connah's Quay	Cae-y-Castell, at Flint (Note: Due to the tenancy problems with the owners of the Deeside Stadium, Connah's Quay Nomads will play their home matches at Cae-y-Castell in Flint.)	3,000	2nd in Cymru Premier
Flint Town United	Flint	Cae-y-Castell	3,000	10th in Cymru Premier
Haverfordwest County	Haverfordwest	Bridge Meadow	2,100	7th in Cymru Premier
Holywell Town^{↑}	Holywell	Halkyn Road	2,000	3rd in Cymru North
Llandudno^{↑}	Llandudno	Maesdu Park	1,013	1st in Cymru North
Penybont	Bridgend	Bryntirion Park	3,000	6th in Cymru Premier
The New Saints	Oswestry	Park Hall	2,034	1st in Cymru Premier
Trefelin BGC^{↑}	Port Talbot	Ynys Park	1,500	1st in Cymru South

^{↑}	Promoted from the Cymru North and Cymru South

== Regular season ==
=== League table ===
Pos	Team	Pld	W	D	L	GF	GA	GD	Pts	Qualification
1	The New Saints	17	15	2	0	57	6	+51	47	Qualification for the Championship Race
2	Penybont	16	12	3	1	34	11	+23	39	Qualification for the Championship Race
3	Connah's Quay Nomads	17	12	2	3	34	10	+24	38	Qualification for the Championship Race
4	Colwyn Bay	17	11	2	4	32	21	+11	35	Qualification for the Championship Race
5	Caernarfon Town	17	10	2	5	43	21	+22	32	Qualification for the Championship Race
6	Airbus UK Broughton	17	10	0	7	37	28	+9	30	Qualification for the Championship Race
7	Barry Town United	17	9	3	5	36	30	+6	30	Qualification for the European Challenger
8	Cardiff Met	17	8	4	5	33	25	+8	28	Qualification for the European Challenger
9	Cambrian United	17	6	4	7	28	41	−13	22	Qualification for the European Challenger
10	Briton Ferry Llansawel	17	5	3	9	18	28	−10	18	Qualification for the European Challenger
11	Llandudno	17	5	2	10	23	30	−7	17	Qualification for the Survival Zone
12	Haverfordwest County	17	5	1	11	12	25	−13	16	Qualification for the Survival Zone
13	Flint Town United	17	4	2	11	19	29	−10	14	Qualification for the Survival Zone
14	Ammanford	17	3	3	11	15	47	−32	12	Qualification for the Survival Zone
15	Trefelin BGC	17	1	3	13	9	41	−32	6	Qualification for the Survival Zone
16	Holywell Town	16	0	2	14	16	53	−37	2	Qualification for the Survival Zone

Updated to match(es) played on 20 November 2026. Source: Cymru Premier
Rules for classification: 1) Points; 2) Goal difference; 3) Goals scored; 4) Head-to-head goal difference; 5) Head-to-head goals scored; 6) Head-to-head away goals scored; 7) Matches won; 8) Away matches won.

=== Results ===
The regular season consists of 30 games, with teams playing each other twice (once at home and once away).

Home \ Away	AIR	AMM	BAR	BFL	CFT	CAM	CAR	CBY	CQN	FTU	HAV	HLL	LND	PEN	TNS	TRE
Airbus UK Broughton		2–0			3–2		0–2	3–4		4–1		6–2			0–2	3–0
Ammanford				3–1	0–5		0–5	2–2	0–2		0–1	2–1		1–5		
Barry Town United	4–2	2–2				2–1	1–0		1–4		1–3		4–1			3–0
Briton Ferry Llansawel	0–2	2–1	1–4					1–0	1–2			1–0	3–0			1–1
Caernarfon Town			0–1	3–1		9–1		3–0	1–0	3–0				1–2	2–3	
Cambrian United	2–3	0–1	3–3	1–1						1–0		2–1	4–3	2–2		
Cardiff Met		4–2		3–0	2–2	2–2					1–0	6–1		0–5	0–5	1–3
Colwyn Bay	1–0		5–2			2–0	2–2		2–1		1–0		2–0			2–0
Connah's Quay Nomads	3–0				1–2	3–0	1–0			2–0	1–1		2–0	1–0		6–0
Flint Town United		3–0	2–3	0–1		0–2	1–1	0–1	1–2			5–0				
Haverfordwest County	0–1			3–1	1–2	0–3	0–3			0–1		1–0		0–3		2–1
Holywell Town	2–3		1–3	1–1	3–5			0–5	1–3						1–6	1–1
Llandudno	1–4	2–0	1–1		1–1		0–1			3–2	2–0	3–1			0–1	
Penybont	2–1		3–1	3–2	2–0			1–0		1–1	2–0		2–1		0–0	
The New Saints		9–0	1–0	1–0		9–0		5–1	0–0	5–0	2–0		2–1			3–0
Trefelin BGC		1–1			0–2	0–4		1–2		0–2			0–4	0–1	1–3	

Updated to match(es) played on 20 November 2026. Source: Cymru Premier
Legend: Blue = home team win; Yellow = draw; Red = away team win.
For upcoming matches, an "a" indicates there is an article about the rivalry between the two participants.

=== Position by round ===
Team ╲ Round	1	2	3	4	5	6	7	8	9	10	11	12	13	14	15	16	17	18	19	20	21	22	23	24	25	26	27	28	29	30
Airbus UK Broughton	7	10	8	11	11	9	8	9	10	8	10	8	8	7	7	5														
Ammanford	11	11	12	12	12	13	13	15	13	14	15	14	13	14	14	14														
Barry Town United	4	3	2	1	1	1	2	2	2	5	6	4	6	6	6	7														
Briton Ferry Llansawel	5	6	9	8	9	11	11	12	12	12	12	11	11	12	12	12														
Caernarfon Town	6	9	7	6	8	5	4	3	5	3	4	5	4	4	4	6														
Cambrian United	12	12	10	7	7	10	10	10	8	9	7	9	9	9	9	9														
Cardiff Met	1	1	6	10	5	4	7	7	9	10	9	7	7	8	8	8														
Colwyn Bay	2	4	11	9	10	8	9	8	7	6	5	6	5	5	5	4														
Connah's Quay Nomads	13	8	5	4	3	3	3	5	4	4	3	2	2	2	2	2														
Flint Town United	10	13	13	13	13	14	15	13	14	15	13	13	14	13	13	13														
Haverfordwest County	14	14	14	14	15	12	12	11	11	11	11	12	12	11	11	11														
Holywell Town	16	16	15	15	16	16	16	16	16	16	16	16	16	16	16	16														
Llandudno	3	2	1	5	4	6	5	6	6	7	8	10	10	10	10	10														
Penybont	8	7	3	3	6	7	6	4	3	2	2	3	3	3	3	3														
The New Saints	9	5	4	2	2	2	1	1	1	1	1	1	1	1	1	1														
Trefelin BGC	15	15	16	16	14	15	14	14	15	13	14	15	15	15	15	15														

Qualification for the Championship Race
Qualification for the European Challenger
Qualification for the Survival Zone

Updated to match(es) played on 6 November 2026. Source: Cymru Premier

== Championship Race ==
The top six teams of the regular season qualify for the Championship Race. The winners qualify for the Champions League and the 2nd-6th placed teams qualify for the Conference League play-off. Results from the regular season are carried over into this round.

== European Challenger ==
The 7th–10th placed teams of the regular season qualify for the European Challenger. The 7th-placed team qualify for the Conference League play-off. Results from the regular season are carried over into this round.

== Survival Zone ==
The bottom six teams of the regular season qualify for Survival Zone. The 14th-placed team qualify for the Cymru Premier play-off, and the bottom two teams are relegated to either the Cymru North or the Cymru South. Results from the regular season are carried over into this round.

== Play-offs ==
=== Conference League play-off ===
Teams placed 2nd–7th qualify for one-off play-off matches, with the winners earning the second spot in the 2027–28 UEFA Conference League first qualifying round (the 2026–27 Welsh Cup winner obtaining the first spot); the higher-placed team per game receive home advantage. If the 2026–27 Welsh Cup winners finish in the top seven, a spot will be vacated.

=== Cymru Premier play-off ===
The runners-up of the 2026–27 Cymru North and 2026–27 Cymru South face other in the semi-finals, with the winners facing the 14th-placed Cymru Premier team for the final place in the 2027–28 Cymru Premier.

== Season statistics ==
=== Attendances ===
Team	Highest	Lowest	Average
Airbus UK Broughton	435	260	325
Ammanford	812	512	609
Barry Town United	823	669	743
Briton Ferry Llansawel	1185	421	844
Caernarfon Town	1392	1199	1331
Cambrian United	1100	572	817
Cardiff Met	359	240	316
Colwyn Bay	2037	1039	1312
Connah's Quay Nomads	603	220	327
Flint Town United	763	320	460
Haverfordwest County	794	554	648
Holywell Town	1001	387	600
Llandudno	721	403	579
Penybont	1025	441	660
The New Saints	601	261	394
Trefelin BGC	785	317	585

Figures taken from FAW Cymru Football app. Correct as of 12 September 2026 (End of Round 8).

=== Hat-trick ===
As of 31 October 2026

Player	For	Against	Result	Date
(Wales) Jasper Payne	Cardiff Met	Holywell Town	6–1 (H)	1 August 2026
(England) Joseph Simatupang Ferguson	Connah's Quay Nomads	Trefelin	6–0 (H)	14 August 2026
(Wales) Zack Clarke	Caernarfon Town	Holywell Town	3–5 (A)	28 August 2026
(England) Elliott Dugan	Barry Town United	Briton Ferry Llansawel	1–4 (A)	31 August 2026
(Wales) Sam Snaith	Cardiff Met	Ammanford	0–5 (A)	31 August 2026
(England) George Peers	Airbus UK Broughton	Flint Town United	4–1 (H)	18 September 2026
(England) George Peers	Airbus UK Broughton	Llandudno	1–4 (A)	9 October 2026
(England) Brad Young	The New Saints	Ammanford	9–0 (H)	23 October 2026
(England) Tom Mehew	Penybont	Cardiff Met	0–5 (A)	31 October 2026

Notes

(H) – Home team
(A) – Away team
