= 2025–26 Cymru North =

Cymru North
- Season: 2025–26
- Dates: 25 July 2025 – 18 April 2026
- Champions: Llandudno
- Promoted: Airbus UK Broughton; Holywell Town; Llandudno
- Relegated: Flint Mountain (voluntarily to Tier 4, reprieving Ruthin Town)
- Top goalscorer: Jamie Breese (18 goals)
- Biggest home win: Airbus UK Broughton 6–0 Rhyl 1879 (24 October 2025); Holywell Town 6–0 Brickfield Rangers (1 November 2025); Penrhyncoch 6–0 Buckley Town (29 November 2025)
- Biggest away win: Gresford Athletic 0–7 Buckley Town (11 October 2025)
- Highest scoring: Holywell Town 8–4 Gresford Athletic (13 September 2025)
- Longest winning run: 9 – Llandudno (22 August 2025–28 November 2025)
- Longest unbeaten run: 16 – Llandudno (25 July 2025-1 January 2026)
- Longest winless run: 12 – Penrhyncoch (26 July 2025–29 November 2025)
- Longest losing run: 6 – Penrhyncoch (12 September 2025–29 November 2025)
- Highest attendance: 1362 - Newtown 2–1 Caersws (25 August 2025)
- Lowest attendance: 48 - Brickfield Rangers 4-1 Penrhyncoch (8 November 2025)

The 2025–26 Cymru North season (also known as the 2025–26 JD Cymru North season for sponsorship reasons) was the sixth season of the second-tier northern region football league in the Welsh football pyramid. The season began on 25 July 2025 and concluded on 18 April 2026. Llandudno finished the season as league champions.

== Teams ==
The league consisted of sixteen teams; twelve teams remaining from the previous season, three teams promoted from the Ardal Leagues, and one team relegated from the Cymru Premier. With the Cymru Premier expanding to sixteen teams for the following season, this was the first season where the top three teams will be promoted to the Cymru Premier, and one team will be relegated to third division.

=== Team changes ===
The following teams changed division since the 2024–25 season.

To Cymru North
▼ Relegated from Cymru Premier
- Newtown
▲ Promoted from Ardal Leagues
- Brickfield Rangers
- Rhyl 1879
- Holyhead Hotspur (via play-off)

From Cymru North
▲ Promoted to Cymru Premier
- Colwyn Bay
▼ Relegated to Ardal NW
- Bangor City 1876
- Prestatyn Town
- Llay Welfare

The promoted teams were the 2024–25 Ardal NE champions Brickfield Rangers, the 2024–25 Ardal NW champions Y Rhyl 1879, and the 2024–25 Ardal Northern play-off winners Holyhead Hotspur. They replaced the 2024–25 Cymru North bottom three teams; Bangor 1876, Prestatyn Town, and Llay Welfare.

The relegated team was the 2024–25 Cymru Premier second-bottom team Newtown (marking their first relegation from the Cymru Premier and ending their streak as one of only two ever presents remaining in the top flight). They replaced the 2024–25 Cymru North champions Colwyn Bay.

=== Stadia and locations ===
Locations of teams in the 2025–26 Cymru North.
Locations of teams in the 2025–26 Cymru North from Flintshire.

| Team | Location | Stadium | Capacity | 2024–25 season |
|---|---|---|---|---|
| Airbus UK Broughton | Broughton | The Airfield | 1,600 | 2nd in Cymru North |
| Brickfield Rangers^{↑} | Wrexham | Clywedog Park | 1,000 | 1st in Ardal NE |
| Buckley Town | Buckley | The Globe | 1,000 | 5th in Cymru North |
| Caersws | Caersws | Recreation Ground | 4,000 | 12th in Cymru North |
| Denbigh Town | Denbigh | Central Park | 1,200 | 9th in Cymru North |
| Flint Mountain | Flint | Bastion Road at Prestatyn | 2,500 | 7th in Cymru North |
| Gresford Athletic | Gresford | The Airfield, at Broughton | 1,600 | 11th in Cymru North |
| Guilsfield | Guilsfield | Community Centre Ground | 1,100 | 6th in Cymru North |
| Holyhead Hotspur^{↑} | Holyhead | The New Oval | 1,000 | 2nd in Ardal NW |
| Holywell Town | Holywell | Halkyn Road | 2,000 | 3rd in Cymru North |
| Llandudno | Llandudno | Maesdu Park | 1,013 | 4th in Cymru North |
| Mold Alexandra | Mold | Alyn Park | 3,000 | 8th in Cymru North |
| Newtown^{↓} | Newtown | Latham Park | 5,000 | 11th in Cymru Premier |
| Penrhyncoch | Penrhyn-coch | Cae Baker | 1,000 | 10th in Cymru North |
| Rhyl 1879^{↑} | Rhyl | Belle Vue | 3,000 | 1st in Ardal NW |
| Ruthin Town | Ruthin | Memorial Playing Fields | 2,000 | 13th in Cymru North |

| ^{↓} | Relegated from the Cymru Premier |
| ^{↑} | Promoted from the Ardal Leagues |

=== Personnel and kits ===
| Team | Manager | Captain | Kit manufacturer | Shirt sponsor (chest) |
|---|---|---|---|---|
| Airbus UK Broughton | (Wales national football team) Mark Allen | (Wales national football team) Joe Palmer | (Germany) Puma | Gardner Aerospace |
| Brickfield Rangers | (Wales national football team) Gareth Wilson | (Wales national football team) Ryan Williams | (Spain) Joma | Travis Perkins |
| Buckley Town | (Wales national football team) Asa Hamilton | (England national football team) Daniel Burgess | (Germany) Adidas | Complete Roofing & Building |
| Caersws | | (Wales national football team) Harry Cottam | (Italy) Macron | Gellidywyll Holiday Home Park |
| Denbigh Town | (Wales national football team) Dewi Llion | (Wales national football team) Keiron Roberts | (Italy) Macron | Travelsport & Lock Stock Self Storage |
| Flint Mountain | (England national football team) Tom Dickinson | (England national football team) Calum Woods | (United States) Arrow Sportswear | Double Time Distribution |
| Gresford Athletic | (Wales national football team) Dave Evans | (Wales national football team) Paul Johnson | (Italy) Macron | Eurogold |
| Guilsfield | (Wales national football team) Gavin Allen | (England national football team) Jake Cook | (Italy) Macron | Hardings Garden Centre |
| Holyhead Hotspur | (Wales national football team) Darren Garmey | (Wales national football team) Tomos Owen | (Spain) Joma | C.L. Jones |
| Holywell Town | (England national football team) Johnny Haseldin | (Republic of Ireland national football team) Danny Sullivan | (Germany) Adidas | Elite Stands UK |
| Llandudno | (Wales national football team) Jordan Hadaway | (England national football team) Anthony Stephens | (Italy) Macron | Go Goodwins |
| Mold Alexandra | (Wales national football team) Barry Owen | (England national football team) Henry Nash | (Spain) Joma | Vision |
| Newtown | (England national football team) Nathan Leonard | (Wales national football team) Kieran Mills-Evans | (Italy) Erreà | Control Techniques |
| Penrhyncoch | (Wales national football team) Gari Lewis | (Wales national football team) Tom Evans | (Spain) Joma | Sterling Asset Management |
| Rhyl 1879 | (England national football team) Paul Moore | (Wales national football team) Reece Fairhurst | (Germany) Adidas | N.W.P.S. Concstruction |
| Ruthin Town | (England national football team) Colin Caton | (Wales national football team) Osian Davies | (Italy) Macron | GJ Teeson Ltd |

=== Managerial changes ===
==== Pre-season ====
| Team | Outgoing manager | Manner | Date of vacancy | Replaced by | Date of arrival |
|---|---|---|---|---|---|
| Newtown | (Wales) Callum McKenzie | Sacked | 8 April 2025 | (England) Nathan Leonard | 21 May 2025 |
| Caersws | (Wales) Neil Lewis | End of caretaker spell | 20 May 2025 | (Wales) Craig Williams | 20 May 2025 |
| Flint Mountain | (England) Aden Shannon | Resigned | 11 June 2025 | | |

==== During the season ====
| Team | Outgoing manager | Manner | Date of vacancy | Week | Position in table | Replaced by | Date of appointment |
|---|---|---|---|---|---|---|---|
| Flint Mountain | (Wales) Andy Ruscoe | Resignation | 7 September 2025 | 6 | 16th | (England) Tom Dickinson | 11 September 2025 |
| Ruthin Town | (England) Dave Evans | Fired | 10 November 2025 | 14 | 13th | (England) Colin Caton | 11 November 2025 |
| Gresford Athletic | (Wales) Eddie Maurice-Jones | Resigned | 13 November 2025 | 14 | 14th | (England) Dave Evans | 26 November 2025 |
| Caersws | (Wales) Craig Williams | Resigned | 1 December 2025 | 16 | 12th | | |
| Flint Mountain | (Wales) Liam Dickinson | Resigned | 21 March 2026 | 27 | 10th | | |

== Standings ==
=== League table ===
| Pos | Team | Pld | W | D | L | GF | GA | GD | Pts | Promotion or relegation |
|---|---|---|---|---|---|---|---|---|---|---|
| 1 | Llandudno (C, P) | 30 | 26 | 2 | 2 | 77 | 22 | +55 | 80 | Promotion to the Cymru Premier |
| 2 | Airbus UK Broughton (P) | 30 | 24 | 3 | 3 | 93 | 22 | +71 | 75 | Promotion to the Cymru Premier |
| 3 | Holywell Town (P) | 30 | 18 | 6 | 6 | 78 | 40 | +38 | 60 | Promotion to the Cymru Premier |
| 4 | Newtown | 30 | 15 | 3 | 12 | 51 | 49 | +2 | 48 | |
| 5 | Rhyl 1879 | 30 | 14 | 4 | 12 | 46 | 55 | −9 | 46 | |
| 6 | Guilsfield | 30 | 13 | 4 | 13 | 50 | 48 | +2 | 43 | |
| 7 | Mold Alexandra | 30 | 12 | 5 | 13 | 38 | 45 | −7 | 41 | |
| 8 | Denbigh Town | 30 | 12 | 4 | 14 | 52 | 59 | −7 | 40 | |
| 9 | Caersws | 30 | 11 | 4 | 15 | 46 | 51 | −5 | 37 | |
| 10 | Brickfield Rangers | 30 | 11 | 4 | 15 | 39 | 49 | −10 | 37 | |
| 11 | Holyhead Hotspur | 30 | 10 | 6 | 14 | 44 | 49 | −5 | 36 | |
| 12 | Penrhyncoch | 30 | 10 | 5 | 15 | 45 | 53 | −8 | 35 | |
| 13 | Buckley Town | 30 | 9 | 3 | 18 | 50 | 77 | −27 | 30 | |
| 14 | Flint Mountain (R) | 30 | 9 | 2 | 19 | 39 | 61 | −22 | 29 | Voluntary relegation to Tier 4 |
| 15 | Gresford Athletic | 30 | 8 | 4 | 18 | 47 | 87 | −40 | 28 | |
| 16 | Ruthin Town | 30 | 6 | 5 | 19 | 36 | 64 | −28 | 23 | Reprieved from relegation (Note: With Flint Mountain having requested relegation to Tier 4, Ruthin Town have been reprieved from relegation into the Ardal NW league.) |

Source: Cymru North
Rules for classification: 1) Points; 2) Goal difference; 3) Goals scored; 4) Matches won; 5) Play-off.
(C) Champions; (P) Promoted; (R) Relegated

== Results ==
| Home \ Away | AIR | BRN | BUC | CAE | DEN | FLT | GRE | GUI | HLE | HLL | LND | MOL | NTN | PRC | RHL | RUT |
|---|---|---|---|---|---|---|---|---|---|---|---|---|---|---|---|---|
| Airbus UK Broughton | — | 5–0 | 3–0 | 4–0 | 2–3 | 3–1 | 2–1 | 3–0 | 4–0 | 0–0 | 3–1 | 8–0 | 2–2 | 4–0 | 6–0 | 4–0 |
| Brickfield Rangers | 0–5 | — | 4–0 | 3–1 | 1–2 | 2–1 | 1–1 | 2–1 | 4–0 | 2–0 | 0–0 | 0–1 | 0–2 | 4–1 | 1–2 | 0–1 |
| Buckley Town | 0–3 | 0–6 | — | 4–3 | 1–4 | 3–0 | 6–4 | 1–2 | 5–5 | 1–2 | 2–3 | 2–2 | 3–0 | 0–2 | 1–2 | 3–2 |
| Caersws | 1–2 | 2–0 | 3–2 | — | 6–0 | 2–2 | 3–1 | 0–0 | 2–2 | 1–3 | 0–1 | 0–2 | 1–0 | 1–2 | 1–0 | 5–1 |
| Denbigh Town | 3–2 | 0–1 | 1–1 | 3–2 | — | 5–1 | 2–3 | 3–2 | 1–1 | 1–2 | 1–2 | 3–1 | 1–0 | 1–0 | 2–1 | 2–2 |
| Flint Mountain | 0–2 | 0–2 | 5–1 | 3–0 | 1–0 | — | 4–4 | 1–0 | 1–2 | 0–3 | 0–1 | 2–1 | 0–1 | 2–3 | 0–1 | 2–0 |
| Gresford Athletic | 2–5 | 1–1 | 0–7 | 0–2 | 0–5 | 3–0 | — | 1–3 | 1–0 | 3–2 | 0–4 | 1–0 | 1–2 | 3–2 | 2–2 | 2–1 |
| Guilsfield | 1–4 | 4–1 | 1–0 | 4–1 | 2–1 | 3–0 | 4–0 | — | 3–1 | 4–4 | 0–1 | 1–2 | 2–1 | 0–1 | 2–3 | 3–2 |
| Holyhead Hotspur | 0–2 | 3–0 | 5–1 | 1–1 | 3–2 | 3–1 | 3–0 | 1–0 | — | 0–1 | 1–2 | 0–1 | 2–0 | 1–1 | 3–1 | 1–3 |
| Holywell Town | 0–3 | 6–0 | 0–1 | 3–1 | 5–1 | 2–1 | 8–4 | 4–1 | 4–1 | — | 1–1 | 2–0 | 6–0 | 4–1 | 1–1 | 5–1 |
| Llandudno | 5–0 | 2–0 | 5–0 | 2–0 | 4–0 | 4–0 | 7–1 | 4–1 | 1–0 | 2–1 | — | 2–1 | 2–0 | 3–0 | 2–0 | 5–2 |
| Mold Alexandra | 1–1 | 2–1 | 1–2 | 0–2 | 2–1 | 3–1 | 4–1 | 0–0 | 1–1 | 1–2 | 1–2 | — | 1–3 | 2–2 | 0–1 | 1–0 |
| Newtown | 0–3 | 4–1 | 0–2 | 2–1 | 4–2 | 3–1 | 0–5 | 2–0 | 1–0 | 2–2 | 1–2 | 1–2 | — | 1–1 | 6–1 | 3–0 |
| Penrhyncoch | 0–1 | 1–0 | 6–0 | 1–3 | 1–1 | 1–4 | 4–1 | 2–3 | 1–0 | 0–1 | 2–3 | 3–1 | 1–2 | — | 3–0 | 1–1 |
| Rhyl 1879 | 1–3 | 0–0 | 2–1 | 3–0 | 3–0 | 2–3 | 1–0 | 1–2 | 4–3 | 3–1 | 3–1 | 0–3 | 2–5 | 3–1 | — | 3–2 |
| Ruthin Town | 0–4 | 1–2 | 1–0 | 0–1 | 3–1 | 1–2 | 2–1 | 1–1 | 0–1 | 3–3 | 1–3 | 0–1 | 2–3 | 3–1 | 0–0 | — |

Source: Cymru North
Legend: Blue = home team win; Yellow = draw; Red = away team win.
For upcoming matches, an "a" indicates there is an article about the rivalry between the two participants.

== Season statistics ==
=== Hat-tricks ===
As of 18 April 2026

| Player | For | Against | Result | Date |
|---|---|---|---|---|
| (Wales) George Peers | Airbus UK Broughton | Buckley Town | 3–0 (A) | 26 July 2025 |
| (England) Bradley Knight | Buckley Town | Holyhead Hotspur | 5–5 (H) | 12 September 2025 |
| (England) Craig Lindfield | Holywell Town | Gresford Athletic | 8–4 (H) | 13 September 2025 |
| (Wales) Owen Cordiner | Mold Alexandra | Rhyl 1879 | 0–3 (A) | 10 October 2025 |
| (Wales) Jamie Breese | Holywell Town | Penrhyncoch | 4–1 (H) | 11 October 2025 |
| (Wales) Max Moore | Buckley Town | Gresford Athletic | 0–7 (A) | 11 October 2025 |
| (Wales) Connor Owen | Holyhaed Hotspur | Gresford Athletic | 3–0 (H) | 15 November 2025 |
| (Wales) Owain Evans | Penrhyncoch | Buckley Town | 6–0 (H) | 29 November 2025 |
| (Wales) Tommy Rowlands | Caersws | Ruthin Town | 5–1 (H) | 13 December 2025 |
| (England) Oliver Lanceley | Airbus UK Broughton | Newtown | 0–3 (A) | 26 December 2025 |
| (England) Danny Warren | Airbus UK Broughton | Penrhyncoch | 4–0 (H) | 31 January 2026 |
| (England) Danny Warren | Airbus UK Broughton | Mold Alexandra | 8–0 (H) | 13 March 2026 |
| (Wales) Jamie Hyne^{4} | Newtown | Rhyl 1879 | 6–1 (H) | 24 March 2026 |
| (Wales) Jay Richardson | Brickfield Rangers | Buckley Town | 0–6 (A) | 3 April 2026 |
| (England) Samuel Flory | Guilsfield | Caersws | 4–1 (H) | 11 April 2026 |
| (England) Callum Bromley | Guilsfield | Gresford Athletic | 4–0 (H) | 18 April 2026 |
| (Wales) Connor Owen | Holyhead Hotspur | Buckley Town | 5–1 (H) | 18 April 2026 |

Notes

(H) – Home team
(A) – Away team
^{4} – player scored 4 goals

=== Monthly awards ===
As of 12 May 2026

| Month | Player of the Month | | Manager of the Month | |
| Month | Manager | Club | Player | Club |
|---|---|---|---|---|
| July/ August | George Peers | Airbus UK Broughton | Johnny Haseldin | Holywell Town |
| September | Jamie Breese | Holywell Town | Jordan Hadaway | Llandudno |
| October | Craig Lindfield | Holywell Town | Jordan Hadaway | Llandudno |
| November | Connor Owen | Holyhead Hotspur | Darren Garmey | Holyhead Hotspur |
| December | Dan Owen | Penrhyncoch | Gari Lewis | Penrhyncoch |
| January | Jamie Breese | Holywell Town | Mark Allen | Airbus UK Broughton |
| February | Jordan Evans / Tom Stephens (shared) | Airbus UK Broughton / Llandudno | Jordan Hadaway | Llandudno |
| March | Haci Ozlu | Gresford Athletic | Jordan Hadaway | Llandudno |
| April | Max McGoona | Mold Alexandra | Mark Allen | Airbus UK Broughton |

=== End of season awards ===
- Cymru North Player of the Season: – Jamie Breese, Holywell Town
- Cymru North Golden Boot: – Jamie Breese, Holywell Town

== Attendances ==
=== Overall ===
| Pos | Team | Total | High | Low | Average | Change |
|---|---|---|---|---|---|---|
| 1 | Airbus UK Broughton | 2,341 | 333 | 123 | 213 | −18.7% |
| 2 | Brickfield Rangers | 524 | 119 | 48 | 76 | n/a^{‡} |
| 3 | Buckley Town | 2,762 | 365 | 151 | 251 | −7.0% |
| 4 | Caersws | 2,477 | 1,300 | 121 | 275 | +69.8% |
| 5 | Denbigh Town | 3,872 | 692 | 93 | 352 | +9.3% |
| 6 | Flint Mountain | 554 | 147 | 50 | 79 | −72.0% |
| 7 | Gresford Athletic | 1,909 | 292 | 85 | 174 | +1.8% |
| 8 | Guilsfield | 1,157 | 205 | 55 | 116 | −5.7% |
| 9 | Holyhead Hotspur | 1,771 | 326 | 120 | 197 | n/a^{‡} |
| 10 | Holywell Town | 3,560 | 732 | 202 | 324 | −6.1% |
| 11 | Llandudno | 2,732 | 490 | 189 | 304 | −14.8% |
| 12 | Mold Alexandra | 1,718 | 324 | 117 | 191 | −11.2% |
| 13 | Newtown | 3,925 | 1,362 | 172 | 436 | n/a^{†} |
| 14 | Penrhyncoch | 1,135 | 400 | 60 | 142 | +11.8% |
| 15 | Rhyl 1879 | 3,845 | 589 | 226 | 385 | n/a^{‡} |
| 16 | Ruthin Town | 3,077 | 1,047 | 150 | 308 | +180.0% |
| | League total | 37,359 | 1,362 | 48 | 245 | −8.2% |

Source: Cymru North
Notes:
^{†} Teams played previous season in Cymru Premier
^{‡} Teams played previous season in Ardal Leagues

=== Home matches played ===
As of 31 January 2026

| Team \ Match played | 1 | 2 | 3 | 4 | 5 | 6 | 7 | 8 | 9 | 10 | 11 | 12 | 13 | 14 | 15 | Total |
|---|---|---|---|---|---|---|---|---|---|---|---|---|---|---|---|---|
| Airbus UK Broughton | 158 | 253 | 224 | 127 | 320 | 333 | 250 | 176 | 174 | 203 | 123 | | | | | |
| Brickfield Rangers | 88 | 119 | 65 | 52 | 48 | 70 | 82 | | | | | | | | | |
| Buckley Town | 331 | 244 | 197 | 365 | 298 | 207 | 351 | 132 | 151 | 240 | 246 | | | | | |
| Caersws | 145 | 157 | 189 | 121 | 143 | 135 | 131 | 1300 | 156 | | | | | | | |
| Denbigh Town | 93 | 253 | 173 | 584 | 419 | 419 | 692 | 490 | 247 | 231 | 271 | | | | | |
| Flint Mountain | 50 | 51 | 57 | 76 | 65 | 108 | | 147 | | | | | | | | |
| Gresford Athletic | 102 | 118 | 145 | 214 | 208 | 292 | 282 | 224 | 86 | 153 | 85 | | | | | |
| Guilsfield | 155 | 115 | 87 | 100 | 75 | 105 | 205 | 160 | 55 | 100 | | | | | | |
| Holyhead Hotspur | 231 | 263 | 132 | 145 | 175 | 172 | 120 | 326 | 207 | | | | | | | |
| Holywell Town | 260 | 224 | 314 | 241 | 576 | 217 | 157 | 402 | 732 | 202 | 235 | | | | | |
| Llandudno | 424 | 238 | 490 | 304 | 189 | 194 | 351 | 192 | 350 | | | | | | | |
| Mold Alexandra | 129 | 203 | 171 | 324 | 223 | 141 | 137 | 273 | 117 | | | | | | | |
| Newtown | 347 | 312 | 1362 | 181 | 223 | 172 | 601 | 189 | 538 | | | | | | | |
| Penrhyncoch | 400 | 80 | 140 | 154 | 60 | 61 | 140 | 100 | | | | | | | | |
| Rhyl 1879 | 361 | 284 | 386 | 335 | 493 | 226 | 299 | 349 | 589 | 523 | | | | | | |
| Ruthin Town | 193 | 351 | 331 | 150 | 201 | 204 | 123 | 1047 | 315 | 162 | | | | | | |
| League total | | | | | | | | | | | | | | | | 37136 |

Source: Cymru North

== See also ==
- 2025–26 Cymru Premier
- 2025–26 Cymru South
- 2025–26 Welsh Cup
- 2025–26 Welsh League Cup
