= 2019–20 Cymru South =

Cymru South
- Season: 2019–20
- Dates: 16 August 2019 – 4 April 2020
- Champions: Swansea University
- Promoted: Haverfordwest County
- Relegated: Caerau (Ely); Cwmamman United; STM Sports F.C.
- Matches: 177
- Goals: 647 (3.66 per match)
- Top goalscorer: Mark Jones Briton Ferry Llansawel (32 goals)
- Biggest home win: Afan Lido 7–0 Cwmamman United (16 November 2019)
- Biggest away win: Cwmamman United 0–6 Briton Ferry Llansawel (10 January 2020)
- Highest scoring: Cwmbran Celtic 4–5 Llanelli Town (25 January 2020)
- All statistics correct as of 7 March 2020.

The 2019–20 Cymru South was the inaugural season of the Cymru South, which is in the second level of the Welsh football pyramid.

The league consisted of sixteen teams with the champions promoted to the Cymru Premier and the bottom three teams relegated to a regional division of FAW League One.

The season commenced on 16 August 2019 and had been scheduled to conclude on 4 April 2020.

After the season was cut short by the Coronavirus-19 pandemic the FAW confirmed its promotion and relegation decision on 16 June 2020.

Haverfordwest County were promoted to the Cymru Premier despite finishing second, after league winners Swansea University failed to achieve a Tier One license. STM Sports were relegated despite finishing 6th, after failing to achieve a Tier Two license. Cwmamman United and Caerau (Ely) were also relegated.

== Teams ==
The inaugural season consisted of twelve teams from the now defunct Welsh Football League Division One, which are Afan Lido, Ammanford, Briton Ferry Llansawel, Cambrian & Clydach Vale B.G.C., Cwmamman United, Cwmbran Celtic, Goytre United, Haverfordwest County, Llantwit Major, Pontypridd Town, Taff's Well and Undy Athletic.

Joining them were Llanelli Town who were relegated from Cymru Premier and Welsh Football League Division Two champions, STM Sports together with runners-up, Swansea University and Caerau (Ely).

Locations of the 2019–20 Cymru South teams

=== Grounds and locations ===
| Team | Location | Ground |
|---|---|---|
| Afan Lido | Aberavon | Marstons Stadium |
| Ammanford | Ammanford | Recreation Ground |
| Briton Ferry Llansawel | Briton Ferry | Old Road |
| Caerau (Ely) | Cardiff | Cwrt-yr-Ala |
| Cambrian & Clydach Vale B.G.C. | Clydach Vale | King George's New Field |
| Cwmamman United | Glanamman | Grenig Park |
| Cwmbran Celtic | Cwmbran | Celtic Park |
| Goytre United | Goytre | Glenhafod Park Stadium |
| Haverfordwest County | Haverfordwest | Bridge Meadow Stadium |
| Llanelli Town | Llanelli | Stebonheath Park |
| Llantwit Major | Llantwit Major | Windmill Ground |
| Pontypridd Town | Aberdare | Aberaman Park |
| STM Sports | Cardiff | Cardiff University Playing Fields |
| Swansea University | Swansea | Sketty Lane |
| Taff's Well | Taff's Well | Rhiw'r Ddar |
| Undy Athletic | Undy | The Causeway |

== League table ==
| Pos | Team | Pld | W | D | L | GF | GA | GD | Pts | Promotion or relegation |
|---|---|---|---|---|---|---|---|---|---|---|
| 1 | Swansea University | 25 | 17 | 5 | 3 | 56 | 31 | +25 | 56 | |
| 2 | Haverfordwest County (P) | 25 | 17 | 4 | 4 | 58 | 26 | +32 | 55 | Promotion to Cymru Premier |
| 3 | Briton Ferry Llansawel | 24 | 15 | 2 | 7 | 65 | 36 | +29 | 47 | |
| 4 | Cambrian & Clydach Vale B.G.C. | 23 | 11 | 7 | 5 | 41 | 31 | +10 | 40 | |
| 5 | Llanelli Town | 26 | 12 | 4 | 10 | 47 | 51 | −4 | 40 | |
| 6 | STM Sports (R) | 22 | 12 | 3 | 7 | 51 | 34 | +17 | 39 | Relegation to FAW League One |
| 7 | Ammanford | 25 | 12 | 1 | 12 | 44 | 47 | −3 | 37 | |
| 8 | Goytre United | 25 | 10 | 6 | 9 | 40 | 41 | −1 | 36 | |
| 9 | Pontypridd Town | 25 | 9 | 8 | 8 | 52 | 41 | +11 | 35 | |
| 10 | Afan Lido | 25 | 10 | 4 | 11 | 47 | 47 | 0 | 34 | |
| 11 | Llantwit Major | 24 | 7 | 6 | 11 | 34 | 39 | −5 | 27 | |
| 12 | Undy Athletic | 21 | 7 | 2 | 12 | 29 | 38 | −9 | 23 | |
| 13 | Cwmbran Celtic | 22 | 6 | 4 | 12 | 29 | 44 | −15 | 22 | |
| 14 | Taff's Well | 25 | 6 | 3 | 16 | 40 | 64 | −24 | 21 | |
| 15 | Cwmamman United (R) | 22 | 5 | 2 | 15 | 22 | 55 | −33 | 17 | Relegation to FAW League One |
| 16 | Caerau (Ely) (R) | 21 | 1 | 5 | 15 | 22 | 52 | −30 | 8 | Relegation to FAW League One |

Updated to match(es) played on 7 March 2020. Source: Cymru South
Rules for classification: 1) Points; 2) Goal difference; 3) Goals scored; 4) Matches won; 5) Play-off.
(P) Promoted; (R) Relegated

== Positions by round ==
The table lists the positions of teams after completion of each round.

| Team ╲ Round | 1 | 2 | 3 | 4 | 5 | 6 | 7 | 8 | 9 | 10 | 11 | 12 | 13 | 14 | 15 | 16 | 17 | 18 | 19 | 20 | 21 | 22 | 23 | 24 | 25 | 26 | 27 | 28 | 29 | 30 |
|---|---|---|---|---|---|---|---|---|---|---|---|---|---|---|---|---|---|---|---|---|---|---|---|---|---|---|---|---|---|---|
| Swansea University | 10 | 3 | 2 | 2 | 5 | 4 | 3 | 1 | 1 | 2 | 1 | 1 | 1 | 2 | 3 | 3 | 2 | 1 | 1 | 1 | 1 | 1 | 1 | 1 | 1 | | | | | |
| Haverfordwest County | 1 | 1 | 1 | 1 | 4 | 3 | 1 | 4 | 3 | 1 | 2 | 3 | 3 | 1 | 1 | 1 | 3 | 2 | 2 | 2 | 2 | 2 | 2 | 2 | 2 | | | | | |
| Briton Ferry Llansawel | 11 | 12 | 13 | 15 | 12 | 9 | 7 | 9 | 10 | 10 | 6 | 6 | 6 | 5 | 2 | 2 | 1 | 3 | 3 | 3 | 3 | 3 | 3 | 3 | 3 | | | | | |
| Llanelli Town | 8 | 4 | 3 | 3 | 2 | 1 | 2 | 2 | 2 | 4 | 4 | 2 | 2 | 3 | 4 | 5 | 5 | 7 | 7 | 8 | 7 | 6 | 6 | 4 | 4 | | | | | |
| STM Sports | 2 | 5 | 5 | 4 | 3 | 5 | 4 | 3 | 5 | 5 | 5 | 4 | 4 | 7 | 5 | 4 | 4 | 4 | 4 | 4 | 5 | 5 | 4 | 5 | 5 | | | | | |
| Cambrian & Clydach Vale B.G.C. | 4 | 2 | 7 | 5 | 1 | 2 | 5 | 6 | 6 | 6 | 7 | 7 | 8 | 8 | 9 | 9 | 9 | 9 | 8 | 7 | 9 | 9 | 9 | 7 | 6 | | | | | |
| Afan Lido | 13 | 6 | 10 | 13 | 11 | 13 | 14 | 12 | 9 | 9 | 10 | 8 | 7 | 6 | 7 | 6 | 6 | 6 | 5 | 5 | 6 | 7 | 8 | 9 | 7 | | | | | |
| Ammanford | 14 | 14 | 15 | 10 | 7 | 6 | 6 | 5 | 4 | 3 | 3 | 5 | 5 | 4 | 6 | 7 | 7 | 5 | 6 | 6 | 4 | 4 | 5 | 6 | 8 | | | | | |
| Goytre United | 5 | 9 | 9 | 12 | 8 | 7 | 9 | 11 | 12 | 11 | 12 | 10 | 9 | 9 | 8 | 8 | 8 | 8 | 10 | 9 | 8 | 8 | 7 | 8 | 9 | | | | | |
| Pontypridd Town | 9 | 15 | 8 | 11 | 13 | 10 | 12 | 13 | 14 | 14 | 11 | 12 | 13 | 13 | 13 | 13 | 13 | 12 | 12 | 12 | 12 | 10 | 10 | 10 | 10 | | | | | |
| Llantwit Major | 12 | 7 | 6 | 8 | 10 | 12 | 10 | 7 | 7 | 7 | 8 | 9 | 10 | 10 | 11 | 11 | 11 | 11 | 11 | 11 | 11 | 12 | 11 | 11 | 11 | | | | | |
| Undy Athletic | 6 | 10 | 11 | 7 | 6 | 8 | 11 | 8 | 8 | 8 | 9 | 11 | 11 | 11 | 10 | 10 | 10 | 10 | 9 | 10 | 10 | 11 | 12 | 12 | 12 | | | | | |
| Taff's Well | 3 | 8 | 4 | 6 | 9 | 11 | 8 | 10 | 11 | 12 | 13 | 13 | 14 | 14 | 14 | 14 | 14 | 14 | 14 | 14 | 14 | 14 | 13 | 13 | 13 | | | | | |
| Cwmbran Celtic | 7 | 13 | 14 | 9 | 14 | 14 | 13 | 14 | 13 | 13 | 14 | 14 | 12 | 12 | 12 | 12 | 12 | 13 | 13 | 13 | 13 | 13 | 14 | 14 | 14 | | | | | |
| Cwmamman United | 15 | 11 | 12 | 14 | 15 | 15 | 15 | 15 | 15 | 15 | 15 | 15 | 15 | 15 | 15 | 15 | 15 | 15 | 15 | 15 | 15 | 15 | 15 | 15 | 15 | | | | | |
| Caerau (Ely) | 16 | 16 | 16 | 16 | 16 | 16 | 16 | 16 | 16 | 16 | 16 | 16 | 16 | 16 | 16 | 16 | 16 | 16 | 16 | 16 | 16 | 16 | 16 | 16 | 16 | | | | | |

| Promotion to Cymru Premier |
| Relegation to FAW League One |

Updated to match(es) played on 21 February 2020. Source: Cymru South

== Results ==
| Home \ Away | AFL | AMM | BFL | CAE | CCV | CAU | CBC | GOU | HWC | LET | LTM | PPT | STM | SWU | TAW | UNA |
|---|---|---|---|---|---|---|---|---|---|---|---|---|---|---|---|---|
| Afan Lido | — | 2–0 | 0–3 | 2–1 | 3–2 | 7–0 | 1–1 | 1–1 | 1–1 | | 5–1 | 1–3 | 1–3 | | 2–1 | 0–1 |
| Ammanford | 2–0 | — | 1–3 | 2–1 | | 3–1 | 5–2 | 2–1 | 0–1 | 2–5 | 4–1 | 0–3 | | 2–4 | 0–3 | 2–1 |
| Briton Ferry Llansawel | 4–3 | 2–2 | — | 3–0 | 0–2 | 2–0 | | 4–2 | 2–4 | 4–1 | 2–4 | 3–0 | 4–1 | 1–4 | | 4–0 |
| Caerau (Ely) | 0–2 | 0–2 | | — | | 1–1 | 1–2 | | 0–2 | 2–3 | 2–2 | | 1–1 | 1–4 | 2–2 | |
| Cambrian & Clydach Vale B.G.C. | 4–1 | | 1–1 | 3–0 | — | | 3–0 | 1–1 | 1–2 | 1–0 | 2–1 | 2–2 | 0–2 | 1–1 | 1–1 | 2–1 |
| Cwmamman United | | | 0–6 | 4–2 | 2–4 | — | 2–1 | 0–2 | | | 1–3 | 0–2 | 0–2 | 1–2 | 1–0 | 2–1 |
| Cwmbran Celtic | | | | 2–0 | | | — | 4–0 | 0–1 | 4–5 | 0–2 | 2–6 | | 1–1 | 2–0 | 0–3 |
| Goytre United | 2–3 | 2–1 | 2–1 | 4–0 | 2–4 | 2–1 | 0–1 | — | 0–2 | 0–1 | 1–1 | | 4–2 | 2–1 | 5–2 | |
| Haverfordwest County | 5–1 | 2–0 | 1–4 | 5–0 | 4–1 | | 2–2 | 1–1 | — | 4–1 | 2–1 | 3–2 | 1–4 | 0–1 | 7–1 | |
| Llanelli Town | 1–0 | 1–4 | 3–2 | | 5–0 | 1–0 | 1–0 | 2–2 | 0–1 | — | 1–0 | 1–1 | 2–1 | 0–2 | 2–2 | 2–2 |
| Llantwit Major | 1–2 | 1–3 | 0–2 | | 0–0 | | 1–2 | | | | — | 0–1 | 3–2 | 2–3 | 3–2 | 1–1 |
| Pontypridd Town | 1–1 | 1–2 | | 4–4 | 2–2 | 1–1 | 6–1 | 0–1 | 1–3 | 2–1 | 1–1 | — | | 1–1 | 6–0 | 3–0 |
| STM Sports | 1–3 | 3–0 | 3–4 | 2–1 | | 3–1 | 0–0 | 2–2 | 0–3 | 6–2 | 3–0 | 3–1 | — | | | 2–1 |
| Swansea University | | 3–2 | 2–0 | | | 2–3 | 2–1 | 3–0 | 1–1 | 3–2 | 1–1 | 3–0 | 0–4 | — | 3–2 | 4–2 |
| Taff's Well | 3–2 | 3–1 | 0–4 | 0–3 | 0–3 | 6–1 | | 0–1 | | 1–3 | 1–2 | 5–2 | | 1–3 | — | 2–1 |
| Undy Athletic | 5–3 | 1–2 | | | 0–1 | 2–0 | 2–1 | | 1–0 | | 0–3 | | | 0–2 | 4–2 | — |

Updated to match(es) played on 7 March 2020. Source: Cymru South
Legend: Blue = home team win; Yellow = draw; Red = away team win.

=== Top scorers ===
| Rank | Player | Club | Goals |
|---|---|---|---|
| 1 | Mark Jones | Briton Ferry Llansawel | 32 |
| 2 | Jordan Carey | Taff's Well | 17 |
| 3 | Kaid Mohamed | Afan Lido | 13 |

== Final League table ==
On 19 May 2020, the league was cancelled due to the COVID-19 pandemic and an unweighted points per game method was applied to determine the final standings. The Football Association of Wales said a decision on promotion and relegation between leagues would be made in due course.

Swansea University were declared champions but they failed to secure a Tier One licence for the 2020–21 season after an unsuccessful appeal and not be eligible for promotion. Second placed Haverfordwest County were granted a Tier One licence.

| Pos | Team | Pld | W | D | L | GF | GA | GD | Pts | PPG |
|---|---|---|---|---|---|---|---|---|---|---|
| 1 | Swansea University (C) | 25 | 17 | 5 | 3 | 56 | 31 | +25 | 56 | 2.24 |
| 2 | Haverfordwest County | 25 | 17 | 4 | 4 | 58 | 26 | +32 | 55 | 2.20 |
| 3 | Briton Ferry Llansawel | 24 | 15 | 2 | 7 | 65 | 36 | +29 | 47 | 1.96 |
| 4 | STM Sports | 22 | 12 | 3 | 7 | 51 | 34 | +17 | 39 | 1.77 |
| 5 | Cambrian & Clydach Vale B.G.C. | 23 | 11 | 7 | 5 | 41 | 31 | +10 | 40 | 1.74 |
| 6 | Llanelli Town | 26 | 12 | 4 | 10 | 47 | 51 | −4 | 40 | 1.54 |
| 7 | Ammanford | 25 | 12 | 1 | 12 | 44 | 47 | −3 | 37 | 1.48 |
| 8 | Goytre United | 25 | 10 | 6 | 9 | 40 | 41 | −1 | 36 | 1.44 |
| 9 | Pontypridd Town | 25 | 9 | 8 | 8 | 52 | 41 | +11 | 35 | 1.40 |
| 10 | Afan Lido | 25 | 10 | 4 | 11 | 47 | 47 | 0 | 34 | 1.36 |
| 11 | Llantwit Major | 24 | 7 | 6 | 11 | 34 | 39 | −5 | 27 | 1.13 |
| 12 | Undy Athletic | 21 | 7 | 2 | 12 | 29 | 38 | −9 | 23 | 1.10 |
| 13 | Cwmbran Celtic | 22 | 6 | 4 | 12 | 29 | 44 | −15 | 22 | 1.00 |
| 14 | Taff's Well | 25 | 6 | 3 | 16 | 40 | 64 | −24 | 21 | 0.84 |
| 15 | Cwmamman United | 22 | 5 | 2 | 15 | 22 | 55 | −33 | 17 | 0.77 |
| 16 | Caerau (Ely) | 21 | 1 | 5 | 15 | 22 | 52 | −30 | 8 | 0.38 |

Updated to match(es) played on 7 March 2020. Source: Cymru South
Rules for classification: 1) Points; 2) Goal difference; 3) Goals scored; 4) Matches won; 5) Play-off.
(C) Champions
