= 2025–26 Cymru South =

Fifth season of the second-tier Southern Welsh football

Cymru South
- Season: 2025–26
- Dates: 25 July 2025 – 18 April 2026
- Champions: Trefelin BGC
- Promoted: Ammanford; Cambrian United; Trefelin BGC
- Relegated: Cwmbran Celtic
- Matches: 240
- Goals: 735 (3.06 per match)
- Top goalscorer: Luke Bowen (21 goals)
- Biggest home win: Pontypridd United 7–0 Cwmbran Celtic (7 November 2025)
- Biggest away win: Baglan Dragons 0–7 Carmarthen Town (28 March 2026); Cwmbran Celtic 1–8 Trefelin BGC (30 March 2026)
- Highest scoring: Trethomas Bluebirds 4–5 Carmarthen Town (6 March 2026); Cwmbran Celtic 1–8 Trefelin BGC (30 March 2026)
- Longest winning run: 15 – Trefelin (10 October 2025–17 March 2026)
- Longest unbeaten run: 22 – Trefelin (16 August 2025–17 March 2026)
- Longest winless run: 28 – Cwmbran Celtic (26 July 2025–11 April 2026)
- Longest losing run: 7 – Afan Lido (29 November 2025–20 February 2026)
- Highest attendance: 926 - Ynyshir Albions 1–3 Cambrian United (26 December 2025)
- Lowest attendance: 37 - Treowen Stars 4–1 Baglan Dragons (17 March 2026)
- Average attendance: 217

The 2025–26 Cymru South season (also known as the 2025–26 JD Cymru South season for sponsorship reasons) was the sixth season of the second-tier Southern region football in Welsh football pyramid. The season began on 25 July 2025 and concluded on 18 April 2026.

== Teams ==
The league consisted of sixteen teams; twelve teams remaining from the previous season, three teams promoted from the Ardal Leagues, and one team relegated from the Cymru Premier. With the Cymru Premier expanding to sixteen teams for the following season, this was the first season where the top three teams will be promoted to the Cymru Premier, and one team will be relegated to third division.

=== Team changes ===
The following teams changed division since the 2024–25 season.

To Cymru South
▼ Relegated from Cymru Premier
- Aberystwyth Town
▲ Promoted from Ardal Leagues
- Treowen Stars
- Cardiff Draconians
- Ynyshir Albions (via play-off)

From Cymru South
▲ Promoted to Cymru Premier
- Llanelli Town
▼ Relegated to Ardal SW
- Taff's Well
- Goytre United
- Penrhiwceiber Rangers

The promoted teams were the 2024–25 Ardal SE champions Treowen Stars, the 2024–25 Ardal SW champions Cardiff Draconians, and the 2024–25 Ardal Southern play-off winners Ynyshir Albions. They replaced the 2024–25 Cymru South bottom three teams; Goytre United, Penrhiwceiber Rangers, and Taff's Well.

The relegated team was the 2024–25 Cymru Premier bottom-placed team Aberystwyth Town (ending a 23-season streak in the top tier of Welsh football). They replaced the 2024–25 Cymru South champions Llanelli Town.

=== Stadia and Locations ===
Locations of teams in the 2025–26 Cymru South.
Locations of teams in the 2025–26 Cymru South from Neath Port Talbot.

Team	Location	Stadium	Cap.	2024–25 season
Aberystwyth Town^{↓}	Aberystwyth	Park Avenue	5,000	12th in Cymru Premier
Afan Lido	Aberavon	Lido Ground	3,000	11th in Cymru South
Ammanford	Ammanford	Recreation Ground	1,000	10th in Cymru South
Baglan Dragons	Baglan	Evans Bevan Playing Field	1,000	8th in Cymru South
Caerau (Ely)	Ely	Cwrt-yr-Ala Road	1,000	12th in Cymru South
Cambrian United	Clydach Vale	M&P Group 3G	1,000	6th in Cymru South
Cardiff Draconians^{↑}	Gabalfa	Lydstep Park	1,000	1st in Ardal SW
Carmarthen Town	Carmarthen	LHP Stadium	2,500	7th in Cymru South
Cwmbran Celtic	Cwmbran	Celtic Park	1,000	13th in Cymru South
Llantwit Major	Llantwit Major	Windmill Ground	1,000	9th in Cymru South
Newport City	Newport	Newport Stadium	5,058	3rd in Cymru South
Pontypridd United	Treforest	USW Sport Park	1,000	5th in Cymru South
Trefelin BGC	Port Talbot	Ynys Park	1,500	4th in Cymru South
Treowen Stars^{↑}	Newbridge	Bush Park	1,000	1st in Ardal SE
Trethomas Bluebirds	Ystrad Mynach	CCB Centre For Sporting Excellence	1,500	2nd in Cymru South
Ynyshir Albions^{↑}	Ynyshir	The Oval	1,000	2nd in Ardal SW

^{↓}	Relegated from the Cymru Premier
^{↑}	Promoted from the Ardal Leagues

=== Personnel and kits ===
Team	Manager	Captain	Kit manufacturer	Front shirt sponsor
Aberystwyth Town	(Wales national football team) Craig Williams	(Montserrat national football team) Desean Martin	(Italy) Acerbis	Aberystwyth University
Afan Lido	(Wales national football team) Lee Surman	(Wales national football team) Liam Griffiths	(Italy) Macron	Shrimpton Developments
Ammanford	(Wales national football team) Wyn Thomas	(Wales national football team) Adam Orme	(Spain) Joma	Morganstone
Baglan Dragons	(Wales national football team) Carl Clement	(Wales national football team) Lewis Holmes	(Spain) Joma	Pinetree Car Superstore
Caerau Ely	(Wales national football team) James McCarthy	(Wales national football team) Tom McLean	(Australia) Classic Sportswear	Mr Homes
Cambrian United	(Wales national football team) Liam Williams	(Wales national football team) Kyle Jones	(Spain) Joma	Pinetree Car Superstore
Cardiff Draconians	(Wales national football team) Nana Baah	(Wales national football team) Luke Bridgeman	(Spain) Joma	
Carmarthen Town	(Wales national football team) Mark Aizlewood	(Wales national football team) Liam Reed	(Spain) Joma	A.T.B. Davies & Son
Cwmbran Celtic	(Wales national football team) Simon Berry	(Wales national football team) Andrew Larcombe	(Denmark) Hummel	Avondale Motor Park
Llantwit Major	(Wales national football team) Karl Lewis	(Wales national football team) Rhys Llewelyn	(Wales) Tor Sports	Compact Cars & Vans
Newport City	(Wales national football team) Sam Houldsworth	(Wales national football team) Lathan Garrett	(England) VX3	Unseen Caffeine
Pontypridd United	(Wales national football team) Matt Driscoll	(Wales national football team) Jamie Veale	(Spain) Joma	UPVCDIRECT.CO.UK
Trefelin BGC	(Wales national football team) Andy Hill	(Wales national football team) Jordan Davies	(Italy) Macron	
Treowen Stars	(Wales national football team) Ben Murphy	(Wales national football team) Christian Davies	(England) VX3	
Trethomas Bluebirds	(Wales national football team) Paul Evans	(Wales national football team) Travis James	(England) VX3	Fernleigh Design
Ynyshir Albions	(Wales national football team) Craig Hopkins	(Wales national football team) Jacob Matthews	(Wales)	

=== Managerial changes ===
==== Pre-season ====
Team	Outgoing manager	Manner	Date of vacancy	Replaced by	Date of arrival
Trethomas Bluebirds	(England) Mark Dunford	Resigned	9 April 2025	(Wales) Paul Evans	14 May 2025
Pontypridd United	(Wales) Andrew Whittington	Resigned	15 April 2025	(England) Mark Dunford	15 April 2025
Llantwit Major	(Wales) Ben Stait	Resigned	21 April 2025	(Wales) Karl Lewis	27 April 2025
Aberystwyth Town	(England) Antonio Corbisiero	Resigned	1 May 2025	(Wales) Callum McKenzie	4 June 2025

==== During the season ====
Team	Outgoing manager	Manner	Date of vacancy	Week	Position in table	Replaced by	Date of appointment
Afan Lido	(Wales) Garry Taylor	20 October 2025	Fired	11	13th	(Wales) Lee Surman	23 January 2026
Aberystwyth Town	(Wales) Callum McKenzie	23 November 2025^{1}	Resigned	15	8th	(Wales) Craig Williams	1 December 2025
Pontypridd United	(England) Mark Dunford	14 December 2025	Fired	17	10th	(Wales) Matt Driscoll	15 December 2025
Caerau Ely	(Wales) Dean Wheeler	30 March 2026	Changed role	29	4th	(Wales) James McCarthy	30 March 2026

1. McKenzie's resignation was announced on 12 of November, but he stayed on until the fixture against Ynyshir Albions on 22 November.

== Standings ==
=== League table ===
Pos	Team	Pld	W	D	L	GF	GA	GD	Pts	Promotion or relegation
1	Trefelin BGC (C, P)	30	25	3	2	83	17	+66	78	Promotion to the Cymru Premier
2	Cambrian United (P)	30	24	4	2	75	20	+55	76	Promotion to the Cymru Premier
3	Ammanford (P)	30	17	9	4	49	26	+23	60	Promotion to the Cymru Premier
4	Caerau (Ely)	30	17	6	7	66	34	+32	57	
5	Carmarthen Town	30	11	12	7	45	38	+7	45	
6	Aberystwyth Town	30	13	5	12	35	38	−3	44	
7	Cardiff Draconians	30	12	4	14	50	48	+2	40	
8	Llantwit Major	30	9	10	11	44	47	−3	37	
9	Treowen Stars	30	10	7	13	51	63	−12	37	
10	Newport City	30	9	10	11	36	48	−12	37	
11	Pontypridd United	30	9	7	14	46	51	−5	34	
12	Afan Lido	30	9	3	18	32	57	−25	30	
13	Trethomas Bluebirds	30	6	11	13	45	62	−17	29	
14	Baglan Dragons	30	5	10	15	26	52	−26	25	
15	Ynyshir Albions	30	5	8	17	27	56	−29	23	
16	Cwmbran Celtic (R)	30	1	7	22	25	78	−53	10	Relegation to the Ardal SE

Source: Cymru South
Rules for classification: 1) Points; 2) Goal difference; 3) Goals scored; 4) Matches won; 5) Play-off.
(C) Champions; (P) Promoted; (R) Relegated

== Results ==
Home \ Away	ABE	AFL	AMM	BAG	CAE	CAM	CFD	CAR	CWM	LTM	NPT	PON	TRE	TRN	TTB	YNY
Aberystwyth Town	—	0–1	0–0	2–1	0–4	1–2	3–2	1–1	2–0	2–2	0–1	0–0	0–2	2–1	3–0	4–0
Afan Lido	0–1	—	3–1	1–1	3–2	0–4	1–3	0–1	4–1	4–1	0–1	2–2	0–2	0–4	1–0	0–2
Ammanford	2–1	6–0	—	1–0	3–2	0–0	2–1	1–1	2–1	2–1	4–0	1–1	0–4	1–0	0–0	2–0
Baglan Dragons	0–1	3–1	0–3	—	0–5	0–1	0–0	0–7	0–0	1–1	3–3	3–0	1–1	3–4	1–1	2–1
Caerau (Ely)	1–0	4–1	3–1	2–1	—	2–3	2–1	3–4	0–0	0–0	4–3	2–0	1–2	3–0	1–1	2–0
Cambrian United	2–0	4–0	1–1	2–0	3–0	—	5–2	3–0	4–0	2–1	2–0	1–0	0–2	4–0	4–2	2–0
Cardiff Draconians	3–1	4–1	0–1	3–1	0–1	0–2	—	2–3	2–1	2–0	0–1	2–2	0–4	4–3	3–0	4–1
Carmarthen Town	1–0	1–0	0–1	0–0	1–1	0–0	2–1	—	2–2	1–1	1–0	0–1	0–2	1–1	1–1	0–0
Cwmbran Celtic	3–1	1–4	1–2	0–1	0–2	1–2	0–1	0–4	—	1–3	1–1	2–5	1–8	1–2	2–2	1–3
Llantwit Major	1–2	1–0	2–3	0–0	1–4	1–3	0–2	0–0	3–1	—	2–2	2–0	0–1	3–2	2–1	2–1
Newport City	0–1	1–0	0–0	1–2	1–1	2–1	2–1	4–4	2–2	2–1	—	0–0	0–5	2–3	1–1	1–1
Pontypridd United	0–1	2–0	0–3	2–0	0–0	2–4	1–2	3–1	7–0	0–4	1–3	—	1–3	5–2	2–1	2–3
Trefelin BGC	4–0	0–0	2–0	3–0	3–0	0–4	3–1	2–0	4–0	3–3	0–2	2–0	—	6–0	3–1	2–0
Treowen Stars	2–3	0–1	1–5	4–1	0–5	2–2	1–0	4–1	2–2	1–1	2–0	2–2	1–3	—	2–0	3–0
Trethomas Bluebirds	2–3	3–2	1–1	2–1	1–5	0–5	4–4	4–5	2–0	2–2	1–0	4–2	1–2	1–1	—	4–1
Ynyshir Albions	0–0	1–2	0–0	0–0	1–4	1–3	0–0	0–2	1–0	2–3	4–0	1–3	0–5	1–1	2–2	—

Source: Cymru South
Legend: Blue = home team win; Yellow = draw; Red = away team win.
For upcoming matches, an "a" indicates there is an article about the rivalry between the two participants.

== Season statistics ==
=== Top scorers ===
Rank	Player	Club	Goals
1	(Wales) Luke Bowen	Trefelin	21
2	(Wales) Liam Eason	Cambrian United	19
2	(Wales) Tyler Brock	Trefelin	19
4	(Wales) Dan John	Ammanford	18
5	(Wales) Liam Thomas	Carmarthen Town	15
5	(Wales) Jack Bevan	Llantwit Major	15

=== Hat-tricks ===
As of 18 April 2026

Player	For	Against	Result	Date
(Wales) Liam Eason	Cambrian United	Treowen Stars	4–0 (H)	25 July 2025
(Wales) Luke Bowen	Trefelin	Ynyshir Albions	0–5 (A)	27 September 2025
(Wales) Cody Williams	Cambrian United	Cardiff Draconians	5–2 (H)	1 November 2025
(Wales) Dan John	Ammanford	Afan Lido	6–0 (H)	7 November 2025
(Latvia) Andzejs Dubjaga	Baglan Dragons	Afan Lido	3–1 (H)	26 December 2025
(Wales) Dan Griffiths	Caerau Ely	Trethomas Bluebirds	1–5 (A)	23 January 2026
(Wales) Dan John	Ammanford	Llantwit Major	2–3 (A)	14 March 2026
(Wales) Luke Bowen	Trefelin	Cardiff Draconians	0–4 (A)	21 March 2026
(Wales) Tyler Brock^{5}	Trefelin	Cwmbran Celtic	1–8 (A)	30 March 2026
(England) Jack Shaw	Trethomas Bluebirds	Cardiff Draconians	4–4 (H)	4 April 2026

Notes

(H) – Home team
(A) – Away team
^{5} – player scored 5 goals

=== Clean sheets ===
Rank	Player	Club	Clean sheets
1	(Wales) Scott Coughlan	Trefelin	17
2	(Wales) Morgan Davies	Cambrian United	14
2	(Wales) Luke Martin	Ammanford	14
4	(Wales) Lee Idzi	Carmarthen Town	11
5	(Democratic Republic of the Congo) Exauce Dimoneke	Caerau Ely/Afan Lido	9

=== Discipline ===
==== Player ====
- Most yellow cards: 10
  - (Montserrat) Desean Martin (Aberystwyth Town)
- Most red cards: 2
  - (Wales) Jonathan Davies (Baglan Dragons)
  - (Wales) Andrew Evans (Pontypridd United)
  - (Wales) Ashley Evans (Cambrian United)
  - (Wales) Dan Griffiths (Caerau Ely)
  - (Wales) Liam McCreesh (Afan Lido)
  - (Wales) Alex Newman-Jones (Trethomas Bluebirds)
  - (England) Ethan O'Toole (Aberystwyth Town)
  - (Wales) Callum Saunders (Trefelin)
  - (Wales) Cory Woods (Afan Lido)

==== Club ====
- Most yellow cards: 72
  - Treowen Stars
  - Llantwit Major
- Fewest yellow cards: 45
  - Trefelin BGC
- Most red cards: 9
  - Aberystwyth Town
- Fewest red cards: 2
  - Llantwit Major
  - Newport City

=== Monthly awards ===
As of 12 May 2026

Month	Player of the Month		Manager of the Month	
Month	Manager	Club	Player	Club
July/ August	Liam Eason	Cambrian United	Liam Williams	Cambrian United
September	Dan Bowen	Cardiff Draconians	Nana Baah	Cardiff Draconians
October	Jack Bevan	Llantwit Major	Nana Baah	Cardiff Draconians
November	Corey Jenkins	Treowen Stars	Andy Hill	Trefelin BGC
December	Sam Cawley	Cardiff Draconians	Liam Williams	Cambrian United
January	Liam Eason	Cambrian United	Andy Hill	Trefelin
February	Luke Bowen	Trefelin	Andy Hill	Trefelin
March	Jack Bevan	Llantwit Major	Lee Surman	Afan Lido
April	Daniel Bowen	Cardiff Draconians	Wyn Thomas	Ammanford

== Attendances ==
=== Overall ===
Pos	Team	Total	High	Low	Average	Change
1	Aberystwyth Town	3,973	428	201	284	n/a^{†}
2	Afan Lido	4,023	707	101	268	−15.7%
3	Ammanford	4,246	512	176	283	+53.0%
4	Baglan Dragons	2,540	395	85	181	+2.8%
5	Caerau (Ely)	2,175	307	82	155	+24.0%
6	Cambrian United	3,405	797	100	227	+155.1%
7	Cardiff Draconians	2,626	340	98	202	n/a^{‡}
8	Carmarthen Town	3,316	447	148	237	−6.7%
9	Cwmbran Celtic	1,644	262	60	126	+26.0%
10	Llantwit Major	2,094	238	57	150	+4.2%
11	Newport City	3,143	462	88	225	+5.1%
12	Pontypridd United	3,489	378	131	249	+6.4%
13	Trefelin BGC	6,289	557	278	419	+24.3%
14	Treowen Stars	1,292	131	37	92	n/a^{‡}
15	Trethomas Bluebirds	2,226	257	52	171	−18.2%
16	Ynyshir Albions	2,874	926	50	205	n/a^{‡}
	League total	49,355			219	+9.5%

Source: Cymru South
Notes:
^{†} Teams played previous season in Cymru Premier
^{‡} Teams played previous season in Ardal Leagues

=== Home matches played ===
As of 2 April 2026

Team \ Match played	1	2	3	4	5	6	7	8	9	10	11	12	13	14	15	Total
Aberystwyth Town	341	281	353	245	214	283	201	205	428	201	353	401	204	263		
Afan Lido	203	151	151	537	221	171	101	707	201	705	223	243	153	115		
Ammanford	237	226	361	387	512	176	312	220	412	209	214	178	243	228		
Baglan Dragons	320	191	347	161	131	85	187	140	140	395	127	117	78	121		
Caerau (Ely)	176	150	136	149	197	247	112	307	165	132	103^{†}	82^{†}	113^{†}	106^{†}		
Cambrian United	168	224	177	797	222	284	135	138	100	195	196	203	213	123		
Cardiff Draconians	240	275	305	98	120	255	220	340	145	165	121	161	181			
Carmarthen Town	243	425	245	235	179	205	215	167	191	447	148	185	205	226		
Cwmbran Celtic	95	81	110	75	220	105	262	160	150	60	101	110	115			
Llantwit Major	238	194	164	151	149	103	130	124	175	102	184	57^{†}	135	188		
Newport City	239	357	462	273	129	207	281	280	349	121	139	88	101	117		
Pontypridd United	378	172	369	187	236	264	310	229	267	228	279	217	131			
Trefelin BGC	376	462	481	431	557	278	278	421	438	521	282	381	357	533		
Treowen Stars	67	116	77	101	67	85	86	131	88	97	95	37^{†}	108	137		
Trethomas Bluebirds	257	213	257	224	190	52	97	55		233	136	124	212	176		
Ynyshir Albions	248	212	208	50	202	112	87	926	126	112	137	163	135	156		
League total																0

Source: Cymru South

notes=^{†} Match was not played at the team's regular home ground

== See also ==
- 2025–26 Cymru Premier
- 2025–26 Cymru North
- 2025–26 Welsh Cup
- 2025–26 Welsh League Cup
