= Jordan Hadaway =

Welsh football coach (born 2002)

Personal information
- Date of birth: January 2002 (age 24)

Team information
- Current team: Llandudno (manager)

Managerial career
- Years: Team
- 2019–2020: Caerwys
- 2023–2024: Llandudno (interim)
- 2024–: Llandudno

Jordan Hadaway (born January 2002) is a Welsh football coach and former player who is manager of Cymru North side Llandudno.

Hadaway stopped playing football at the age of 14 to focus on coaching, becoming the youngest manager in Welsh senior football at the age of 18. In 2026, he guided Llandudno to promotion to the Cymru Premier, aged 24.

== Playing career ==
Hadaway played youth football in his hometown Holywell, before focusing on coaching at the age of 14.

== Coaching career ==
=== Early career ===
Hadaway began coaching at the age of 14, and was a coach at Holywell Town.

Hadaway was managing in the Welsh fifth tier aged 18, being the youngest manager in the Welsh senior football during his time at Caerwys, and possibly the youngest ever in British football. He shared the position with Ethan Jones.

He left Caerwys to work as a coach at the Real Madrid Foundation.

He later worked as a coach for Cefn Druids, joining the club in January 2021.

=== Llandudno ===
After working for Llandudno as a youth team coach, he was appointed interim first team manager in July 2023, aged 21. He became permanent manager in April 2024.

He also worked as manager of the women's team, winning the league title in 2024, although the club was not promoted as they lost in the play-offs.

He guided the men's team to promotion to the 2026–27 Cymru Premier from the 2025–26 Cymru North, also winning the league championship.

== Personal life ==
His parents are fans of English club Everton. Hadaway combined his early coaching career with studying for a degree in teaching at Liverpool Hope University. Whilst manager of Llandudno he worked as a PE teacher at a local school.
