= Bayan Aman =

Saint Lucian footballer

Personal information
- Full name: Bayan Mohammed Aman
- Date of birth: 1 July 2005 (age 21)
- Place of birth: London, England
- Height: 1.71 m (5 ft 7 in)
- Position: Midfielder

Team information
- Current team: Trefelin
- Number: 20

Youth career
- 2013–2019: Vista YFC
- 2019–2023: Colchester United

Senior career*
Years	Team	Apps	(Gls)
2023–2024	Colchester United	0	(0)
2023	→ Felixstowe & Walton United (loan)	2	(0)
2024	Hendon	6	(0)
2024–2025	Sutton Common Rovers	8	(0)
2025–2026	Velež Nevesinje	28	(2)
2026–	Trefelin	10	(0)

International career^{‡}
2024–	Saint Lucia	7	(0)
- * Club domestic league appearances and goals as of 08:40, 8 November 2026 (UTC) ‡ National team caps and goals as of 27 March 2026

Bayan Aman (born 1 July 2005) is a Saint Lucian footballer who plays for Cymru Premier club Trefelin and the Saint Lucia national team.

== Club career ==
Aman began playing football in primary school before a teacher recommended joining his local club, Vista YFC. He remained with the club from age eight to thirteen. From Vista, he joined the academy of Colchester United and worked his way through the club's under-18 and under-21 sides. He made his senior debut in 2023 during a month-long loan at Felixstowe & Walton United. During the loan, he made only two league appearances after committing a serious foul against a Wroxham player during his second appearance which saw the match abandoned after fourteen minutes.

In August 2024, Aman left Colchester United and joined Hendon F.C. of the Isthmian League Premier Division. The club first spotted the player at Colchester in a fourth round 2023–24 Essex Senior Cup victory over Walthamstow. In total, he made ten official appearances throughout the season, including six in the league and two in the 2024–25 FA Cup qualifying rounds. After making one appearance for Northwood F.C. in the Middlesex Senior Cup, Aman joined Sutton Common Rovers of the same league in November 2024. He played eight league matches for the club by the end of the season.

In February 2025, it was announced that Aman had signed for a club abroad for the first time, joining First League of the Republika Srpska club FK Velež Nevesinje in Bosnia and Herzegovina.

In September 2026 on transfer deadline day he signed for Cymru Premier club Trefelin.

== International career ==
Born in London, Aman qualifies to represent Saint Lucia by descent. He received his first senior call-up in October 2024 for two 2024–25 CONCACAF Nations League B matches against Saint Martin. He made his debut on 11 October in the first of the two matches as a second-half substitute for Leaus Henville.

=== International career statistics ===
As of match played 27 March 2026.

Saint Lucia national team
Year	Apps	Goals
2024	2	0
2025	4	0
2026	1	0
Total	7	0
