= Belle Vue, Rhyl =

Multi-purpose stadium in Rhyl, Wales

Coordinates: 53°19′08″N 3°28′34″W

Belle Vue
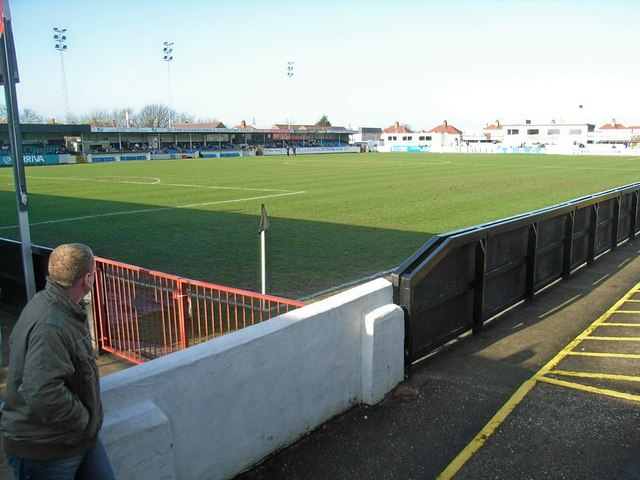
- Interactive map of Belle Vue
- Full name: Belle Vue
- Location: Rhyl, Denbighshire, Wales
- Owner: C.P.D. Y Rhyl 1879
- Operator: C.P.D. Y Rhyl 1879
- Capacity: 3,000 (1,720 seated)
- Surface: Grass

Tenants
- Rhyl F.C. (1892–2020); C.P.D. Y Rhyl 1879 (2021–)

Belle Vue is a multi-purpose stadium in Rhyl, Wales. It is used mostly for football matches, and is the home ground of C.P.D. Y Rhyl 1879 . The stadium holds 3,000 people, with a seating capacity of 1,720.

The stadium has occasionally hosted youth-level international football matches, including an under-16s match between Wales and Scotland. Recently, as a UEFA Category 2 stadium, it has hosted home European matches of other Welsh clubs whose home grounds did not meet the Category 2 requirements, including those of Bala Town and Connah's Quay Nomads.

Domestically it has hosted the Welsh Cup final once in 1962 and the Welsh League Cup once in 2003.

The stadium has 400 seats from the 'Gene Kelly stand' temporary structure at Manchester City's former ground Maine Road.

C.P.D. Y Rhyl 1879 bought the stadium outright in October 2024.

== Stands ==
Belle Vue has four stands, with three out of the four sides of the ground being covered. The Arriva and Don Spendlove Stand make up the largest stand at Belle Vue, and it is here where the changing rooms and officials' room are housed. Opposite these is the George James Stand which is used to accommodate away supporters when fan segregation is in place. Behind one goal is the NWPS Stand which is all seated, and at the other the Grange Road End, which has an open seating area in the middle and unused terraces to the sides.

The George James Stand runs down one side of the pitch. It accommodates away fans and holds the TV gantry as well as the Police Control Unit.
