= C.P.D. Y Rhyl 1879 =

Association football club in Wales

CPD Y Rhyl 1879
- Full name: Clwb Pêl Droed Y Rhyl 1879
- Nickname: The Lilywhites
- Founded: 1879, as Rhyl F.C
- Ground: Belle Vue
- Capacity: 3,000 (1,720 seated)
- Chairman: Tom Jamieson
- Manager: Rob Hughes
- League: Cymru North
- 2025–26: Cymru North, 5th of 16

Clwb Pêl Droed Y Rhyl 1879 (Welsh for 'Rhyl 1879 football club') is a Welsh football club based in Rhyl in Denbighshire, Wales. The team currently play in the Cymru North. They are a phoenix club, continuing the legacy of Rhyl FC's following its dissolution in April 2020.

== History ==
A week after the announcement that Rhyl would be liquidated, a group was formed to take forward the idea of a replacement club in Rhyl. Former Rhyl FC board members Adam Roche and Tom Jamieson agreed to work alongside the Rhyl Fans Association, with Jamieson taking the role of interim chairman. RFA members were balloted and overwhelmingly endorsed the approach.

Rhyl Fans Association ran an online poll for supporters to choose a name for the new club. The unanimous choice was Rhyl FC which fans believed would be acceptable as the former full name of the closed club was Rhyl Football Club Belle Vue Limited. On advice from the Football Association of Wales the club were told a new name would be required. RFA members were again balloted again with 82% voting. CPD Y Rhyl 1879 received 54.6% of the vote and AFC Rhyl received 45.4%.

The club announced it had officially submitted its application to the North Wales Coast FA to play tier four football in 2020–21.

In July 2020 it was confirmed that the club had been placed in the tier four Premier Division of the newly formed North Wales Coast East Football League.

The 2020–21 season was cancelled due to the COVID-19 pandemic. The club's first competitive game was in the 2021–22 Welsh Cup, with a 10–0 home victory over Rhyl Dragons in the first qualifying round. The team progressed through the second qualifying round, beating Prestatyn Sports 2–0 and in the first round, beating Rhydymwyn 1–0. The second round saw them come up against Cymru Premier champions Connah's Quay Nomads, losing 5–0.

The club finished the 2021–22 as league champions and on 9 June 2022, it was announced that the club had been promoted to the tier 3 Ardal NW League for the 2022–23 season.

== Ground ==
In May 2020 it was announced that the club had reached an agreement with David Butters, owner of Belle Vue to use the facilities for the upcoming season, with an exclusive option to purchase the ground. In May 2021 the club signed a two-year lease extension to play at Belle Vue, whilst negotiations to purchase the stadium continued.

In October 2024, the club bought the ground outright.

== Records ==
- Best Welsh Cup performance: Semi final (2025-26)

== Honours ==
- Ardal NW – Champions: 2024–25
- North Wales Coast East Football League Premier Division – Champions: 2021–22
- North Wales Coast FA Cookson Cup – Winners 2021–22

== Current squad ==
As of 5 September 2026

Note: Flags indicate national team as defined under FIFA eligibility rules; some limited exceptions apply. Players may hold more than one non-FIFA nationality.

No.	Pos.	Nation	Player
1	GK	ENG	Luke Riley
2	DF	WAL	Dan Apantaku
3	DF	WAL	William Holmes
4	DF	WAL	Ryan Austin
5	DF	WAL	Reece Fairhurst (Captain)
6	MF	ENG	Rocco Hewitt
7	MF	WAL	Morgan Murray
8	MF	ENG	Ben Lightfoot
9	MF	WAL	Joshua Jones
10	MF	WAL	Max Moore
11	FW	WAL	Archie Jones

No.	Pos.	Nation	Player
12	DF	ENG	Joe Ly
13	GK	WAL	Stephen Bullen
14	FW	ENG	Dan Cockerline
15	DF	WAL	Joel Giblin
16	MF	ENG	Bradley Barnes
17	MF	WAL	Jack Coll (on loan from Flint Town United)
18	DF	IRL	Jordan Brett
19	MF	WAL	Paul Fleming
20	DF	WAL	Luka Graham
—	DF	NAM	Alex-Romio Kenamuinjo

=== Out on loan ===
Note: Flags indicate national team as defined under FIFA eligibility rules; some limited exceptions apply. Players may hold more than one non-FIFA nationality.

No.	Pos.	Nation	Player
—	MF	ENG	Promise Mmadi (on loan until 31 May 2027)

== Club officials ==
The club's management committee members are as follows:

- Chairman: Tom Jamieson
- Managing Director & Club Secretary: Adam Roche
- Club Treasurer: Paul Senior
- Media & Comms Officer: Ryan Desmond
- Head of female football & safeguarding: Andy Lowrie
- Stadium Manager: Daniel Cruse
- Community Lead: Shon Hughes
- Head of Boys football & safeguarding: Justin Jones
- Head Steward: David Ogden
