= Pure Swansea F.C. =

Association football club in Wales

Coordinates: 51°36′21.1″N 3°59′15.1″W

Pure Swansea
- Full name: Pure Swansea Football Club
- Nickname: PSFC
- Founded: 2011
- Ground: Swansea Bay Sports Park, Sketty Lane, Swansea.
- Capacity: 250
- Manager: Jack Midwinter
- League: Ardal SW League
- 2024–25: Ardal SW League, 3rd of 16

Pure Swansea Football Club, formerly known as Swansea University, is a Welsh football club which plays in the Ardal SW League. They play at Sketty Lane, Swansea.

== History ==
The current team was reformed as Team Swansea in 2011 by students from Swansea University. Since the club's reformation, the club has achieved six promotions, two Gwalia cups, one Senior Cup and two West Wales Cups, including a 10–0 win in the 2015 final.

In 2017 the club sealed the Swansea Senior League championship and West Wales Cup double in May 2017, securing their return to the Welsh Football League in a play-off against Neath & District League champions Cwm Wanderers.

In May 2018 the club was promoted to Welsh Football League Division Two as Champions. They followed this up in April 2019 by gaining promotion to the new Cymru South as runners-up in Division Two. They were also awarded the divisional fair play award for the season.

In May 2020 they were crowned champions of Cymru South after the curtailment of the season as a result of the Coronavirus pandemic.

However, due to finishing 15th in the 2022–23 Cymru South, they were relegated into the Ardal Leagues, from 2023–24 onwards.

In 2025 the team was renamed to Pure Swansea FC.

=== Honours ===
- Cymru South Champions – 2019–20
- Ardal SW Champions – 2025–26
- Welsh Football League Division Two Runners-Up - 2018–19
- Welsh Football League Division Three Champions - 2017–18
- Swansea Senior League Division One Champions - 2016–17
- Swansea Senior League Division One Runners-Up - 2015–16
- Swansea Senior League Division Two Runners-Up - 2014–15
- Swansea Senior League Division Three Runners-Up - 2013–14
- Swansea Senior League Division Four Champions - 2011–12
- Swansea Senior League Open Cup Winners- 2014–15
- Ardal South Cup – Winners: 2023–24, 2025–26
- West Wales Intermediate Challenge Cup – Winners (2) - 2014–15; 2016–17
- Gwalia Cup Winners (2): - 2012–13; 2013–14

== Staff ==
- Chairman: Jonathan Hughes
- Head of Operations: Kurtis March
- Head of Football: Jack Midwinter
- Coach: Nathan Cadette

== Seasons ==
Season	League								Welsh Cup	FAW Trophy	Other
Season	Pyramid Tier	Division	P	W	D	L	Pts	Pos	Welsh Cup	FAW Trophy	Other
2011-12 (Note: as Team Swansea)	8	Swansea Senior League Division Four	20	15	3	2	46	1			
2012-13	7	Swansea Senior League Division Three	18	9	2	7	29	4			Gwalia Cup Winners
2013-14	7	Swansea Senior League Division Three	24	16	4	4	52	2			Gwalia Cup Winners
2014-15	6	Swansea Senior League Division Two	18	13	2	3	45	2	R1		West Wales Intermediate Cup winners
2015-16	5	Swansea Senior League Division One	16	10	2	4	32	2			
2016-17	5	Swansea Senior League Division One	20	18	0	2	54	1	1Q		West Wales Intermediate Cup winners
2017-18	4	Welsh Football League Division Three	30	24	3	3	75	1	1Q	R2	
2018-19	3	Welsh Football League Division Two	30	20	4	6	64	2	R2	R5	
2019-20	2	Cymru South	24	17	4	3	55	1	R4		

Notes

- 1Q: First qualifying round
- 2Q: Second qualifying round
- R1: First Round
- R2: Second Round
- R5: Fifth Round

== University College Swansea / Swansea University ==
Swansea University has a Welsh League heritage dating back to the 1960s, when under its previous guise as the University College Swansea. The university first entered the Welsh League in the 1966–67 season winning Division Two in their first season. In the 1967–68 season they finished runners-up in Division One to seal promotion to the Premier Division in just two seasons. They were relegated at the end of the 1968–69 season but were again promoted as Division One Champions. In 1971–72 they were relegated again, remaining in Division One until 1978 when they were relegated to Division Two. The club remained in the Welsh league until 1985 when it left the league.

=== Honours ===
- Welsh Football League Division One (2nd tier Welsh Football League) Champions - 1969–70
- Welsh Football League Division One (2nd tier Welsh Football League) Runners-Up - 1967–68
- Welsh Football League Division Two (3rd tier Welsh Football League) Champions - 1966–67

== Welsh Football League history ==
Information sourced from the Football Club History Database and the Welsh Soccer Archive.

Season	Pyramid Tier	League	Final position
1966–67	3	Welsh Football League Division Two (Note: From the 1964–65 season Division 1 was renamed 'Premier Division', Division 2 East and West were replaced by 'Division One' and 'Division Two' (effectively Division Two and Division Three).)	1st – Champions (Promoted)
1967–68	2	Welsh Football League Division One	2nd – Runners-Up (Promoted)
1968–69	1	Welsh Football League Premier Division	18th (Relegated)
1969–70	2	Welsh Football League Division One	1st – Champions (Promoted)
1970–71	1	Welsh Football League Premier Division	16th
1971–72	1	Welsh Football League Premier Division	17th (Relegated)
1972–73	2	Welsh Football League Division One	13th
1973–74	2	Welsh Football League Division One	6th
1974–75	2	Welsh Football League Division One	9th
1975–76	2	Welsh Football League Division One	15th
1976–77	2	Welsh Football League Division One	11th
1977–78	2	Welsh Football League Division One	17th (Relegated)
1978–79	3	Welsh Football League Division Two	10th
1979–80	3	Welsh Football League Division Two	12th
1980–81	3	Welsh Football League Division Two	11th
1981–82	3	Welsh Football League Division Two	11th
1982–83	3	Welsh Football League Division Two	11th
1983–84 (Note: In this season The Premier Division (The Top Tier Division) was renamed 'National Division'. The 2nd tier division was renamed 'Premier Division' with the 3rd tier division named 'Division 1'.)	3	Welsh Football League Division One	15th
1984–85	3	Welsh Football League Division One	16th
