= Cymru South =

Association football league in Wales

- Founded: 2019; 7 years ago
- Country: Wales
- Confederation: UEFA
- Number of clubs: 16
- Level on pyramid: 2
- Promotion to: Cymru Premier
- Relegation to: Ardal Leagues
- Domestic cup: Welsh Cup
- Current champions: Trefelin (1st title) (2025–26)
- Broadcaster: S4C
- Website: faw.cymru/cymru-south
- Current: 2026–27 Cymru South

The Cymru South is a regional football league in Wales (Welsh: Cymru), covering the southern half of the country. It initially had clubs with semi-professional status. Together with the Cymru North, it forms the second tier of the Welsh football league system.

The first year of its operation was in 2019–20 with the Football Association of Wales owning and administering the tier 2 leagues for the first time. These changes followed on from a review of the Welsh Football Pyramid. Prior to 2019, the equivalent league was the Welsh Football League Division One, covering South Wales.

== Member clubs for 2025–26 season ==
Locations of teams in the 2026–27 Cymru South.
Locations of teams in the 2025–26 Cymru South from Neath Port Talbot.
Locations of teams in the 2025–26 Cymru South from Rhondda Cynon Taf.

Team	Location	Stadium	Capacity	2025–26 season
Aberystwyth Town^{↓}	Aberystwyth	Park Avenue	5,000	6th in Cymru South
Afan Lido	Aberavon	Lido Ground	3,000	12th in Cymru South
Baglan Dragons	Baglan	Evans Bevan Playing Field	1,000	14th in Cymru South
Caerau (Ely)	Ely	Cwrt-yr-Ala Road	1,000	4th in Cymru South
Caerphilly Athletic	Caerphilly	CCB Centre For Sporting Excellence}	1,500	1st in Ardal SE
Cardiff Draconians^{↑}	Gabalfa	Lydstep Park	1,000	7th in Cymru South
Carmarthen Town	Carmarthen	LHP Stadium	2,500	5th in Cymru South
Llanelli Town	Llanelli	Stebonheath Park	1,000	12th in Cymru Premier
Llantwit Major	Llantwit Major	UWL Stadium	1,000	8th in Cymru South
Newport City	Newport	Newport Stadium	5,058	10th in Cymru South
Pontardawe Town	Pontardawe	Parc Ynysyderw	1,000	2nd in Ardal SW
Pontypridd United	Treforest	USW Sport Park	1,000	11th in Cymru South
Pure Swansea	Swansea	Swansea Bay Sport Park	1,000	1st in Ardal SW
Treowen Stars^{↑}	Newbridge	Bush Park	1,000	9th in Cymru South
Trethomas Bluebirds	Ystrad Mynach	CCB Centre For Sporting Excellence	1,500	13th in Cymru South
Ynyshir Albions^{↑}	Ynyshir	The Oval	1,000	15th in Cymru South

^{↓}	Relegated from the Cymru Premier
^{↑}	Promoted from the Ardal Leagues

== Champions ==
Season	Winners	Runners-up	Third place
2019-20	Swansea University (1)	Haverfordwest County	Briton Ferry Llansawel
2020-21	Season cancelled due to COVID-19		
2021-22	Llantwit Major (1)	Pontypridd Town	Briton Ferry Llansawel
2022-23	Barry Town United (1)	Llanelli Town	Briton Ferry Llansawel
2023-24	Briton Ferry Llansawel (1)	Llanelli Town	Ammanford
2024-25	Llanelli Town (1)	Trethomas Bluebirds	Newport City
2025-26	Trefelin (1)	Cambrian United	Ammanford

== Promoted to Cymru Premier ==
- 2019–20: Haverfordwest County (runners-up)
- 2020-21: Competition cancelled
- 2021–22: Pontypridd Town (runners-up)
- 2022–23: Barry Town
- 2023–24: Briton Ferry Llansawel
- 2024–25: Llanelli Town
- 2025-26: Trefelin Boys & Girls, Cambrian United. Ammanford

== Relegated into Cymru South from Cymru Premier ==
- 2019–20: Carmarthen Town
- 2020–21: Competition cancelled
- 2021-22: Barry Town United
- 2022–23: None
- 2023–24: Pontypridd United
- 2024–25: Aberystwyth Town
- 2025-26: Llanelli

== Relegated from Cymru South ==
- 2019–20: STM Sports, Cwmamman United and Caerau (Ely)
- 2020–21: Competition cancelled
- 2021–22: Port Talbot Town, Risca United and Undy Athletic
- 2022–23: Swansea University and Ynyshir Albions
- 2023–24: Pontardawe Town, Abertillery Bluebirds and Abergavenny Town
- 2024–25: Penrhiwceiber Rangers, Goytre United and Taffs Well
- 2025-26: Cwmbran Celtic

== Promoted into Cymru South ==
- 2019–20: Trefelin, Risca United and Port Talbot Town
- 2020–21: Competition cancelled
- 2021–22: Abergavenny Town, Pontardawe Town and Ynyshir Albions
- 2022–23: Abertillery Bluebirds, Baglan Dragons and Caerau (Ely)
- 2023–24: Newport City, Penrhiwceiber Rangers and Trethomas Bluebirds
- 2024–25: Cardiff Draconians, Treowen Stars and Ynyshir Albions
- 2025-26: Pure Swansea, Caerphilly Athletic and Pontardawe Town

== See also ==
- List of association football competitions
- Welsh Football League
- Cymru Championship
