= Llandudno F.C. =

Association football club in Wales

Coordinates: 53°18′56.876″N 3°49′46.553″W

Llandudno
- Full name: Llandudno Football Club
- Nickname: The Seasiders
- Founded: 1878; 148 years ago (as Gloddaeth Rovers)
- Ground: Maesdu Park; Llandudno
- Capacity: 3,000 (1,100 seated)
- Chairman: Dave Guinn
- Manager: Jordan Hadaway
- League: Cymru Premier
- 2025–26: Cymru North, 1st of 16 (promoted)
- Website: www.llandudnofc.co.uk
Home colours	Away colours

Llandudno Football Club (Welsh: Clwb Pêl-droed Llandudno) is a Welsh football club that currently play in the Cymru Premier.

== History ==
Football in Llandudno dates back to 1878 when the club was originally known as Gloddaeth Rovers for around a decade. Gloddaeth Rovers were then replaced by Llandudno Swifts as the towns' main club. Following the demise of Swifts in 1901, a new club, Llandudno Amateurs were formed.

The club was formed for the purpose of providing activity for cricketers during their close season. A full international, Wales v Ireland, was played on the "council field" in 1898. Llandudno were founder members of the Welsh National League (North) in 1921 and were champions in 1923 and League Cup winners in 1930. The club won the North Wales Combination FA Cup in 1926 and the North Wales Amateur Cup in 1929. Controversy struck the club in 1931 when the FAW instructed them to play in East Wales, which Llandudno refused and were suspended.

Llandudno were founder members of the Welsh League North in 1935 and remained in the league until war broke out in 1939 and then rejoined in 1945 and stayed until 1974. Llandudno were league champions in 1936 and repeated the feat the following season. In addition the club won the North Wales Amateur Cup in 1948 and 1962, the Alves Cup in 1951 and the Cookson Cup in 1965.

In 1966, Llandudno Amateurs were formed, splitting off from Llandudno Town. In 1970, Amateurs were Vale of Conwy Football League champions. As a result they were promoted to the Welsh League North.

Llandudno Town folded in 1976, leaving Amateurs as the main club in the town. The name was briefly revived when Llandudno Swifts renamed in 1979, but they folded in December of that year, withdrawing from the Welsh League North.

In 1987, Llandudno Amateurs adopted their current name of Llandudno Football Club, and reverted to the former colours of black and white stripes.

The club moved to its current home at Maesdu Park in 1991 after the "council field" was used for the construction of an ASDA store in the late 1970s, now the new Parc Llandudno. The current ground was officially opened in 1991 and floodlights were added in 1994. The following season saw the erection of a clubhouse and two small stands which provide covered seating for 130 spectators. The club has since undergone major transitions, with the addition of a press box. In the 2004–05 season new dressing rooms were completed. New grandstands, with disabled access, are in place and the stadium meets the criteria set down for Cymru Premier football.

In August 2014, Wales national football team manager Chris Coleman visited Maesdu Park to officially open Llandudno's new £420,000 3G pitch.

After a successful 2014–15 Cymru Alliance season, Llandudno were promoted as champions to the Welsh Premier League for the first time in their history.

In July 2015, Llandudno FC entered into a significant strategic partnership with local organisation, MBi Consulting Ltd. As such the club was known as MBi Llandudno Football Club and Maesdu Park was renamed as Park MBi Maesdu. Llandudno enjoyed a remarkable first season in the Welsh Premier League which saw them finish third and earn them a place in the Europa League for the first time in their history in 2016–17.

The club were relegated back to the second tier in the 2018–19 season and played in the Cymru North.

On 20 May 2021, it was announced that Llandudno, alongside Scottish Championship side Ayr United, League of Ireland First Division side Cobh Ramblers and NIFL Premiership side Portadown, had entered into a partnership with Premier League club Burnley, which was dubbed the 'British Isles Club Partnerships' by Burnley. As a result of the partnership, Llandudno, and the other affiliated clubs, will benefit from a range of support from Burnley, having access to the club's football, operational and commercial expertise as well as access to coaching education and player access.

In 2026 they secured promotion to the Cymru Premier as Cymru North champions.

== European record ==
Season	Competition	Round	Club	Home	Away	Aggregate
2016–17	UEFA Europa League	1Q	(Sweden) IFK Göteborg	1–2	0–5	1–7

Notes

- 1Q: First qualifying round

== Honours ==
- Welsh League (North):
  - Champions: 1935–36, 1936–37
- North Wales Combination FA Cup:
  - Winners: 1925–26
- Welsh National League (North):
  - Champions: 1922–23
- Welsh National League (North) Cup:
  - Winners: 1929–30
- North Wales Amateur Cup:
  - Winners: 1928–29, 1947–48, 1961–62
- Alves Cup:
  - Winners: 1950–51
- Cookson Cup:
  - Winners: 1964–65
- Cymru Alliance:
  - Champions: 2014–15
- Cymru North:
  - Champions: 2025–26
  - Runners-up: 2021–22

== Current Squad ==
As of 19 September 2026

Note: Flags indicate national team as defined under FIFA eligibility rules; some limited exceptions apply. Players may hold more than one non-FIFA nationality.

No.	Pos.	Nation	Player
1	GK	ENG	Joel Torrance
2	FW	ENG	Callum Stephens
3	DF	ENG	Anthony Stephens
4	DF	WAL	Iwan Cartwright
5	DF	ENG	Tom Stephens
6	MF	WAL	Ross Weaver
7	DF	ENG	Kieran Lloyd
8	FW	ENG	Mark Cadwallader
9	FW	ENG	Adam Stephens
10	FW	WAL	Harvey Bennett
11	MF	ENG	Aidan Higgins
12	FW	ENG	Cammron Morris
15	DF	ENG	Nicholas Grogan
16	MF	WAL	Ben Maher

No.	Pos.	Nation	Player
17	MF	AUS	Joe Faux
18	MF	ENG	Kieran Smith
20	MF	WAL	Jordan Pownall
21	DF	WAL	Kai Edwards
22	FW	WAL	Marc Williams
23	DF	WAL	Cai Roberts
26	DF	ENG	Jayden Lloyd
27	FW	ITA	Cody Ruberto
28	MF	WAL	Leon Hughes
29	MF	WAL	Liam Higgins
32	DF	WAL	Tom Monks
51	GK	WAL	Jack Fisher
52	FW	ENG	Niall Flint

=== Out on loan ===
Note: Flags indicate national team as defined under FIFA eligibility rules; some limited exceptions apply. Players may hold more than one non-FIFA nationality.

No.	Pos.	Nation	Player
—	GK	WAL	Joe Angus (at Mold Alexandra)
—	MF	WAL	Alex Boss (at Ruthin Town)

No.	Pos.	Nation	Player
—	MF	ENG	Nathan Lloyd (at Ruthin Town)

=== Management Team ===
As of 28 April 2024

Position	Name
Manager	(Wales) Jordan Hadaway
Assistant Manager	(Wales) Grant Montgomery
Coach	(Wales) Darren Moss
Kit Manager	(Wales) Iain Dyer
Club Physio	(Wales) Rebecca Vale
