= Trefelin B.G.C. =

Association football club in Wales

Coordinates: 51°36′24″N 3°46′21″W

Trefelin BGC
- Full name: Trefelin Boys & Girls Club
- Nickname: Tref
- Founded: 1984
- Ground: Ynys Park, Port Talbot, Neath Port Talbot
- Capacity: 1,500
- Chairman: Martyn Wagstaff
- Manager: Andy Hill
- League: Cymru Premier
- 2025–26: Cymru South, 1st of 16 (promoted)
- Website: https://trefelinbgc.com

Trefelin Boys & Girls Club, often shortened to Trefelin BGC, is an association football club who play their home games at Ynys Park in Port Talbot, Neath Port Talbot, Wales. Their men's team play in the Cymru Premier.

Trefelin BGC was founded in 1984. Initially they played their matches in the local park (the plough) however they later moved to their current home of Ynys Park near Port Talbot following local fundraising efforts. In 2000, Trefelin BGC won the FAW Trophy by winning in the final 6–2 against Bryntirion Athletic F.C. In 2007 they were promoted as champions of the South Wales Amateur League Second Division and following their first season in the First Division, Trefelin BGC finished the season as runners-up to eventual champions and former Welsh League team AFC Porth. In 2014, Trefelin BGC won promotion from the South Wales Amateur League First Division with at least a fourteen-game unbeaten run. In the same year, they won the W John Owen Cup by defeating AFC Bargoed. In the 2015–16 season, Trefelin won promotion to the Welsh Football League after winning the newly formed South Wales Alliance League.

On 2 January 2019 the club announced the signing of former Swansea City striker Lee Trundle.

The club were champions of the Welsh Football League Division One at the end of the 2019–20 season, remaining unbeaten in the league during a season curtailed by the COVID-19 pandemic. They were promoted to the second tier of the Welsh football pyramid in June 2020, joining the Cymru South for the 2020–21 season.

In 2026 they confirmed promotion to the Cymru Premier for the first time as Cymru South champions.

== Current squad ==
As of 18 September 2026

Note: Flags indicate national team as defined under FIFA eligibility rules; some limited exceptions apply. Players may hold more than one non-FIFA nationality.

No.	Pos.	Nation	Player
1	GK	WAL	Scott Coughlin
2	DF	WAL	Morgan Thomas
3	DF	WAL	Declan Evans
4	DF	WAL	Louis Caramella-Gerrard
5	DF	WAL	Shaun MacDonald
7	MF	NIR	Kostya Georgievsky
8	MF	WAL	Jordan Davies (Captain)
9	FW	WAL	Daniel John
10	MF	WAL	Tyler Brock
11	MF	WAL	Lewys Ware
12	MF	WAL	Callum Saunders
14	DF	WAL	Jacob Jones

No.	Pos.	Nation	Player
15	MF	WAL	Kori Parker
16	MF	WAL	Roan Piper
17	MF	ENG	Louis Phillips (on loan from The New Saints)
18	FW	CAN	Owen Degelman
19	MF	WAL	Jasper Jones
20	MF	LCA	Bayan Aman
21	GK	WAL	Harlie Jones
26	DF	WAL	Kane Owen
28	DF	WAL	Owen Thomas
30	MF	WAL	Joshua Williams-Richards
33	FW	WAL	Luca Pockett
35	DF	WAL	Osian Davies

== Honours ==
- Cymru South
  - Champions: 2025–26
- Welsh Football League Division One
  - Champions: 2019–20

== Women ==
In 2010, Trefelin BGC Ladies were promoted from the Southern Conference into the Welsh Premier Women's Football League. Following two years in Welsh women's top flight, the team broke away from Trefelin BGC and renamed themselves Port Talbot Town Ladies after becoming affiliated with Port Talbot Town F.C.
