= Undy A.F.C. =

Association football club in Wales

Coordinates: 51°34′41.6″N 2°48′53.2″W

Undy Athletic
- Full name: Undy Athletic Football Club
- Nickname: The Tiger
- Founded: 1947 (dissolved 1962); 1970 (reformed)
- Ground: The Causeway, Undy
- Capacity: 3,000 (250) seated
- Chairman: Jim Roberts
- Manager: Ben Leahy
- League: Ardal SE League
- 2025–26: Ardal SE League, 5th of 16
- Website: https://www.undyafc.co.uk
| Home colours | Away colours |

Undy Athletic Football Club is a Welsh association football club based in the village of Undy, Monmouthshire. The club's senior men's team plays in the Ardal SE League.

The club's senior women's team play in the South Wales Women & Girls League Division Two. In addition, there are two other men's teams (reserves and third team), a youth team and a large junior section playing mixed and girls' football. The club has been a chartered provider of the FAW's Huddle programme since its inception, and provides disability football sessions to the local community.

== History ==
The club was formed in 1947, playing at local level in South Wales and winning the Argus Cup 3 times in 15 years. However, in 1962 the club disbanded as a result of financial difficulties. In 1970, the club was reformed as Undy United, renaming to Undy AFC in the mid-1980s. At this same time the club took over the running of the playing fields. During the 1990s the club adopted its red colours that it still uses today. The club won the Gwent County League Division One in 2011 and reaching the Welsh Football League for the first time, entering in Division Three. They won promotion at the first attempt, and then under the guidance of Manager Laurence Owen, sealed their highest ever position in 2016 when they finished third in Division Two and earned promotion to Welsh Football League Division One, finishing in the top half of the top division in their first two seasons, step 2 on the Welsh football pyramid. This season also saw the first international footballer to play for Undy, with Gibraltar international Jamie Coombes signing for the club in February 2017. Laurence Owen brought an end to 32 years in club management by announcing his retirement at the end of 2017–18 after another successful campaign, he was replaced by Reserve team manager Jason Pritchard.

Undy also has two senior women's teams and many junior teams competing in local leagues.

== Honours ==
- Gwent County League Division One: 2010–11
- Welsh Football League Division Three: 2011–12
- Highest League Finish: 7th, Welsh Football League Division One, 2016–17
