= Llantwit Major A.F.C. =

Association football club in Wales

Coordinates: 51°24′46″N 3°28′45.5″W

Llantwit Major
- Full name: Llantwit Major Athletic Football Club
- Nicknames: The Major, Windmill Army
- Founded: 1962; 64 years ago
- Ground: Windmill Lane; Frampton Lane; Llantwit Major
- Chairman: John Guy
- Manager: Karl Lewis
- League: Cymru South
- 2025–26: Cymru South, 8th of 16
Home colours	Away colours

Llantwit Major A.F.C. is a football club based in Llantwit Major, Vale of Glamorgan. The team currently plays in the Cymru South.

== History ==
Llantwit Major A.F.C. was founded in 1962. In 1971 they joined the South Wales Amateur League.

In the 2011–12 season they were South Wales Amateur League champions, and joined the Welsh Football League Division Three. From 2016 to 2018 the club achieved back to back promotions, reaching Division One. In 2019 they were founder members of the newly formed Cymru South. In 2021–22 they won the Cymru South title, but were denied promotion, allowing runners-up Pontypridd Town to enter the Cymru Premier instead.

In the 2023–24 season they appeared in the FENIX Trophy, and finished second in their group, with four points in four games. This included a win over the reigning champions BK Skjold in their opening game. In 2024–25 the competition switched to a knockout format. Llantwit Major were drawn against K. Berchem Sport. In the first leg, Llantwit Major lost 7–2 at Berchem. In the return leg, a month later, they lost 1–0 at the SDM Glass Stadium in Bridgend.

== Supporters and rivalries ==
Llantwit Major supporters are known as the 'Windmill Army'.

The club maintains a strong friendship with Boca Juniors due to the shared colours of both clubs. As a result, River Plate are considered rivals, as well as traditional rivals Pontypridd United FC.

== Honours ==
- Cymru South – Champions: 2021–22
- South Wales FA Senior Cup – Winners: 2010–11
- Welsh Football League Division Two – Champions: 2017–18
- Welsh Football League Division Three – Champions: 2016–17
- South Wales Amateur League Division One – Champions: 1979–80, 1980–81, 1983–84, 2011–12
- South Wales Amateur League Division Two – Champions: 1998–99
- Corinthian Cup – Winners: 1980–81, 1983–84, 1986–87
- Barry & District League Division Two – Champions: 1984–85
- Bridgend & District League Premier Division Cup – Winners: 1998–99
- Bridgend & District League Division One – Champions: 1990–91
- Bridgend & District League Division One Challenge Shield – Winners: 1992–93, 1998–99
- Mr Blobby Cup - Winners - 2022, 2025, 2026

== Hall of fame ==
- Rhys Gould
