= Ammanford A.F.C. =

Association football club in Wales

Coordinates: 51°47′23.7″N 3°59′44.4″W

Ammanford AFC
- Full name: Ammanford Association Football Club
- Founded: 1992
- Ground: The Rec, Ammanford
- Manager: Wyn Thomas
- League: Cymru Premier
- 2025–26: Cymru South, 3rd of 16 (promoted)
- Website: https://ammanfordafc.co.uk/
Home colours	Away colours

Ammanford Association Football Club is a football club from Ammanford, Carmarthenshire in Wales. They play in the Cymru Premier. They are now based at the Recreation Ground in Ammanford. The club is affiliated to the Football Association of Wales (FAW) and the West Wales Football Association (WWFA).

== History ==
Football was played in the Ammanford and Betws parish in the 1920s by Ammanford Thursdays (who only played when the shops closed on Thursday afternoons). In the 1930s Ammanford Corinthians played on Betws Park. Betws Blackbirds football team was founded circa 1946, later joining the Carmarthenshire League. The club were elected to the Welsh league and in 1952 reached the final of the West Wales Amateur Cup. In the 1958–59 season they won promotion to the first division.

In 1960 the club changed their name to Ammanford Town, to avoid confusion with similarly named teams. They merged with Ammanford Athletic A.F.C. in 1992, changing their name to Ammanford A.F.C.

The club reached the fourth round of the Welsh Cup in 1991 and made it to the quarter-finals in February 1999.

On 18 April 2026 they were promoted to the Cymru Premier for the first time ever after a 2–1 win over Cwmbran Celtic. They ended the 2025–26 season in third place.

== Squad ==
As of 18 September 2026

Note: Flags indicate national team as defined under FIFA eligibility rules; some limited exceptions apply. Players may hold more than one non-FIFA nationality.

No.	Pos.	Nation	Player
1	GK	WAL	Luke Martin
2	DF	WAL	Seth Woodhouse
2	DF	GAM	Babucar Sauane
4	DF	WAL	Euros Griffiths
5	DF	SCO	Chris Bell
6	MF	WAL	Matthew Delaney
7	FW	WAL	Adam John
8	MF	WAL	Adam Orme (captain)
10	MF	WAL	Callum Thomas
11	MF	WAL	Rhys Davies
12	DF	WAL	Luke Sylvester
13	MF	WAL	Joe Hopkins
14	MF	WAL	Matthew Fisher
15	DF	WAL	Gruffudd Morgan
17	MF	WAL	Charlie Davies

No.	Pos.	Nation	Player
19	DF	WAL	Owain Lyn Davies
20	FW	WAL	Hari Lloyd
21	DF	WAL	Elliott Scotcher
22	MF	WAL	Harri Rowe
23	MF	WAL	Luc Owen
24	FW	WAL	Jonathan Evans
25	MF	WAL	Callum Shirt
26	DF	WAL	Lucas Davies
27	DF	WAL	Ceiron Davies
28	DF	WAL	Gruff Newman
29	MF	WAL	Jacob Protheroe
30	FW	WAL	Joseph Case
40	MF	WAL	Jack Long (player/ coach)
80	GK	WAL	Thomas Wright (on loan from Swansea City)
99	GK	WAL	Oliver Williams
