= 2006–07 Welsh Cup =

Tournament details
- Country: Wales

Final positions
- Champions: Carmarthen Town
- Runners-up: Afan Lido

The 2006–07 FAW Welsh Cup was the 120th edition of the Welsh Cup, the national football cup competition of Wales. Carmarthen Town won the competition after beating Afan Lido 3–2 in the final.

== Preliminary round ==
Home team	Score	Away team
Aberbargoed Buds	2–1	Ystradgynlais
Conwy United	2–1	Glan Conwy
Corwen	0–2	Rhydymwyn
Cwmbran Celtic	2–1	Newcastle Emlyn
Four Crosses	2–2 (a.e.t.) (4–2 p)	Carno
Llangollen Town	0–1	Ruthin Town
Llanidloes Town	2–1	Knighton Town
Llansawel	0–1	Goytre AFC
Llantwit Fardre	3–2	Chepstow Town
Llanwern	4–1	Abertillery Excelsiors
Pentwyn Dynamos	5–1	Cwmamman United
Penycae	4–0	Caerwys
Risca United	1–3	AFC Porth
Sealand Rovers	2–4 (a.e.t.)	Cefn United

== First round ==
Home team	Score	Away team
Afan Lido	3–1	Penrhiwceiber Rangers
Ammanford	4–1 (a.e.t.)	Pontyclun
Barry Town	3–2 (a.e.t.)	Croesyceiliog
Bridgend Town	2–0	Taffs Well
Briton Ferry Athletic	0–1	Bettws
Buckley Town	3–1	Castell Alun Colts
Caerleon	2–1	Garw Athletic
Caldicot Town	0–1	Cwmbran Celtic
Cambrian & Clydach Vale	1–3	Morriston Town
Cardiff Corinthians	3–1 (Note: Win was awarded to Maesteg Park after Cardiff Corinthians fielded an ineligible player.)	Maesteg Park
Chirk AAA	1–3	Conwy United
Coedpoeth United	0–3	Bethesda Athletic
Rhydymwyn	1–3	Penycae
Denbigh Town	6–0	Glyn Ceiriog
Dinas Powys	1–0	Bryntirion Athletic
ENTO Aberaman Athletic	1–2	Neath Athletic
Flint Town United	4–0	Nefyn United
Garden Village	6–0	AFC Llwydcoed
Glantraeth	3–3 (a.e.t.) (3–4 p)	Bodedern
Gresford Athletic	6–3	Halkyn United
Guilsfield	3–2	Four Crosses
Hawarden Rangers	0–1	Llanrwst United
Holyhead Hotspur	2–1	Lex XI
Holywell Town	3–3 (a.e.t.) (3–5 p)	Brickfield Rangers
Llanberis	0–3	Mynydd Isa
Llandudno	4–0	Ruthin Town
Llandudno Junction	3–4	Llanrug United
Llanfyllin Town	3–2	Carno
Llanrhaeadr	3–4	Penrhyncoch
Goytre AFC	2–3 (a.e.t.)	UWIC
Llantwit Fardre	0–1	Newport YMCA
Llanwern	7–0	Aberbargoed Buds
Mold Alexandra	1–2	Llanfairpwll
Pentwyn Dynamos	3–4	Caerau (Ely)
Pontardawe Town	4–1	Porthcawl Town
Pontypridd Town	4–0	Treharris Athletic
Prestatyn Town	5–0	Llandyrnog United
Presteigne St. Andrews	4–0	Kerry
Pwllheli	2–1	Cefn United
Queens Park	3–7 (a.e.t.)	Brymbo
Rhos Aelwyd	2–4	Bala Town
AFC Porth	2–4 (a.e.t.)	West End
Ton Pentre	1–0	Merthyr Saints
Tredegar Town	0–1	Llangeinor
Troedyrhiw	1–2 (a.e.t.)	Ely Rangers

== Second round ==
Home team	Score	Away team
Barry Town	0–4	Afan Lido
Bodedern	3–3 (a.e.t.) (4–3 p)	Bethesda Athletic
Brickfield Rangers	1–4	Airbus UK
Bridgend Town	5–2	Garden Village
Brymbo	1–1 (a.e.t.) (5–3 p)	NEWI Cefn Druids
Buckley Town	2–1	Llanfyllin Town
Caerleon	2–1 (a.e.t.)	UWIC
Connah's Quay Nomads	2–1	Aberystwyth Town
Cwmbran Celtic	2–3 (a.e.t.)	Maesteg Park
Cwmbrân Town	1–7	Carmarthen Town
Denbigh Town	2–4	Newtown
Dinas Powys	3–0	Morriston Town
Ely Rangers	2–2 (a.e.t.) (4–2 p)	Caerau (Ely)
Goytre United	1–2	West End
Guilsfield	0–5	Bala Town
Llandudno	3–0	Flint Town United
Llanelli	5–0	Bettws
Llanfairpwll	0–6	Rhyl
Llanegfni Town	0–2	Holyhead Hotspurs
Llanrug United	0–2	Bangor City
Mynydd Isa	0–5	Caersws
Neath Athletic	2–0	Llanwern
Newport YMCA	2–1 (a.e.t.)	Ammanford
Penrhyncoch	2–0	Conwy United
Pontardawe Town	1–2 (a.e.t.)	Pontypridd Town
Port Talbot Town	3–2	Haverfordwest County
Prestatyn Town	2–4	CPD Porthmadog
Presteigne St. Andrews	1–1 (a.e.t.) (4–3 p)	Penycae
Pwllheli	2–0	Gresford Athletic
The New Saints	3–1	Llanrwst United
Ton Pentre	6–0	Llangeinor
Welshpool Town	4–1	Caernarfon Town

== Third round ==
Home team	Score	Away team
Afan Lido	3–0	Bodedern
Bridgend Town	1–1 (a.e.t.) (5–4 p)	Airbus UK
Caerleon	1–1 (a.e.t.) (2–4 p)	Ely Rangers
Caersws	3–0	Buckley Town
Carmarthen Town	2–0	West End
Holyhead Hotspur	2–0	Presteigne St. Andrews
Maesteg Park	0–1	Llandudno
Neath Athletic	3–2	Brymbo
Newport YMCA	1–3	Connah's Quay Nomads
Newtown	2–0	Dinas Powys
Penrhyncoch	0–2	Llanelli
CPD Porthmadog	2–0	Bangor City
Port Talbot Town	3–0	Bala Town
Pwllheli	1–2	The New Saints
Ton Pentre	1–0	Rhyl
Welshpool Town	2–1 (a.e.t.)	Pontypridd Town

== Fourth round ==
Home team	Score	Away team
Port Talbot Town	3–1 (a.e.t.)	Ton Pentre
Carmarthen Town	0–0 (a.e.t.) (5–4 p)	Caersws
Connah's Quay Nomads	3–1	Llandudno
CPD Porthmadog	2–2 (a.e.t.) (3–2 p)	The New Saints
Llanelli	7–0	Newtown
Welshpool Town	3–0	Neath Athletic
Holyhead Hotspur	2–1 (a.e.t.)	Bridgend Town
Ely Rangers	1–2	Afan Lido

== Quarter-final ==
Home team	Score	Away team
Carmarthen Town	1–1 (a.e.t.) (4–3 p)	CPD Porthmadog
Holyhead Hotspur	1–5	Welshpool Town
Port Talbot Town	0–1	Afan Lido
Llanelli	6–2	Connah's Quay Nomads

== Semi-final ==
Home team	Score	Away team
Afan Lido	1–1 (a.e.t.) (7–6 p)	Welshpool Town
Carmarthen Town	1–0	Llanelli

== Final ==
6 May 2007

Afan Lido	2–3	Carmarthen Town
I. Jones 16', 76'		13', 47' Mohamed; 26' Walters

Stebonheath Park, Llanelli
Attendance: 946
Referee: Lee Evans
