= 2007–08 Welsh Cup =

Tournament details
- Country: Wales

Final positions
- Champions: Bangor City
- Runners-up: Llanelli

The 2007–08 FAW Welsh Cup is the 121st edition of the Welsh Cup, the national football cup competition of Wales. The 2007–08 tournament commenced on 18 August 2007 and concluded on 4 May 2008. The 2007–08 Welsh Cup winners are Bangor City.

== Preliminary round ==
Games were played on 18 August 2007.

Mid
Tie no	Home team	Score	Away team
1	Carno	5–3	Four Crosses
2	Kerry	1–2	Knighton Town
3	Llanidloes Town	0–1	Montgomery Town
4	Newbridge on Wye	3–4	Newcastle Emlyn

North
Tie no	Home team	Score	Away team
1	Chirk AAA	2 – 2	Amlwch Town
Chirk AAA won 5–3 on penalties
2	Corwen	2 – 1	Holywell Town
3	Llanberis	3–0	Castell Alun Colts
4	Nantlle Vale	1–0	Llandudno Junction
5	Nefyn United	4–1	Llangollen Town
6	Rhos Aelwyd	3–4	Halkyn United

South
Tie no	Home team	Score	Away team
1	Abertillery Excelsiors	2–3	Cwmamman United
2	Cwmaman Institute	6–1	Cwmffrwdoer Sports
3	Llanwern	6–3	Monmouth Town
4	Risca United	2–2	Goytre
Goytre won 5–4 on penalties
5	Seven Sisters	1–1	Porthcawl Town
Seven Sisters won 4–3 on penalties
6	Ystradgynlais	1–2	Aberbargoed Buds

== First round ==
Matches played on 15 September 2007.

Mid
Tie no	Home team	Score	Away team
1	Carno	1–4	Penrhyncoch
2	Guilsfield	2–1	Prestiegne St. Andrews
3	Montgomery Town	2–1	Llanfyllin Town
4	Llanrhaeadr ym Mochnant	3–2 (aet)	Berriew
5	Newcastle Emlyn	4–1	Knighton Town

North
Tie no	Home team	Score	Away team
1	Bala Town	6–3	Denbigh Town
2	Bodedern	0–2	Llanfairpwll
3	Brickfield Rangers	0–12	Brymbo
4	Coedpoeth United	0–1	Mold Alexandra
5	Conwy United	4–0	Glyn Ceiriog
6	Corwen	3–1	Lex XI
7	Nantlle Vale	0–2	Chirk AAA
8	Glan Conwy	1–3	Llanrug United
9	Halkyn United	2–1	Ruthin Town
10	Hawarden Rangers	3–0	Buckley Town
11	Holyhead Hotspur	3–2 (aet)	Cefn United
12	Llanberis	4–3 (aet)	Llanrwst United
13	Llandyrnog United	3–1	Penycae
14	Mynydd Isa	3–1	Glantraeth
15	Nefyn United	2–0	Gresford Athletic
16	Prestatyn Town	1–2	Llandudno Town
17	Pwllheli	3–4	Gap Queens Park
18	Tywyn & Bryncrug	6–6	Rhydymwyn
Tywyn & Bryncrug won 5–4 on penalties

South
Tie no	Home team	Score	Away team
1	Bridgend Town	3–1	Garden Village
2	Bryntirion Athletic	6–1	Pontypridd Town
3	Caerau (Ely)	7–0	Garw
4	Caerleon	4–0	Treharris
5	Cwmaman Institute	4–2	Llangeinor
6	Cwmamman United	3–0	Llwydcoed
7	Dinas Powys	3–0	Penrhiwceiber Rangers
8	Ely Rangers	1–4	Llantwit Fardre
9	Goytre United	3–0	Pontardawe Town
10	Llansawel	2–5	ENTO Aberaman Athletic
11	Llanwern	4–2 (aet)	Barry Town
12	Maesteg Park	2–1	Seven Sisters
13	Merthyr Saints	2–0	Cwmbran Town
14	Newport YMCA	2–0	Goytre
15	Pentwyn Dynamos	3–1	Cwmbran Celtic
16	Pontyclun	1–2	Cambrian & Clydach
17	Taffs Well	3–2	Caldicot Town
18	Ton Pentre	3–0	Aberbargoed Buds
19	Tredegar Town	1–1	Cardiff Corinthians
Cardiff Corinthians won 4–3 on penalties
20	Troedyrhiw	3–7	Croesyceiliog
21	West End	2–1	Bettws
22	UW-Aberystwyth	(w/o)	Briton Ferry Athletic

== Second round ==
Matches played on 6 October 2007.

North
Tie no	Home team	Score	Away team
1	Bangor City	3–0	Llandyrnog United
2	Brymbo	4–0	Halkyn United
3	Caernarfon Town	2–1	Llanfairpwll
4	Caersws	9–0	Mold Alexandra
5	Connah's Quay Nomads	3–1 (aet)	The New Saints
6	Corwen	1–3	Mynydd Isa
7	Gap Queens Park	3–1	Penrhyncoch
8	Guilsfield	3–2 (aet)	Airbus UK
9	Holyhead Hotspur	2–1	Bala Town
10	Llanberis	1–5	Newtown
11	Llandudno Town	1–2	NEWI Cefn Druids
12	Llangefni Town	5–0	Hawarden Rangers
13	Llanrug United	5–1	Llanrhaeadr ym Mochnant
14	Nefyn United	2–0	Chirk AAA
15	Porthmadog	0–2	Welshpool Town
16	Rhyl	10–0	Montgomery Town
17	Tywyn & Bryncrug	3–2	Conwy United

South
Tie no	Home team	Score	Away team
1	Aberystwyth Town	3–0	Newcastle Emlyn
2	Afan Lido	3–1	Croesyceiliog
3	Bridgend Town	1–2	Bryntirion Athletic
4	Caerau (Ely)	3–2	Goytre United
5	Caerleon	2–1	Taffs Well
6	Cardiff Corinthians	2–3 (aet)	Ton Pentre
7	Cwmaman Institute	0–3	ENTO Aberaman Athletic
8	Cwmamman United	0–5	Dinas Powys
9	Haverfordwest County	1–0	Llantwit Fardre
10	Maesteg Park	2–0	Briton Ferry Athletic
11	Merthyr Saints	1–2	Carmarthen Town
12	Neath Athletic	6–0	Llanwern
13	Newport YMCA	4–1	Cambrian & Clydach
14	Pentwyn Dynamos	3–7	Llanelli
15	West End	1–2	Port Talbot Town

== Third round ==
Matches played on 3 November 2007.

Tie no	Home team	Score	Away team
1	Aberystwyth Town	3–1	Neath Athletic
2	Bryntirion Athletic	4–2	Dinas Powys
3	Caerleon	2–0	Brymbo
4	Caersws	2–3 (aet)	Bangor City
5	Connah's Quay Nomads	0–2	Guilsfield
6	ENTO Aberaman Athletic	3–1	Caerau (Ely)
7	Gap Queens Park	3–1	Afan Lido
8	Haverfordwest County	3–0	Ton Pentre
9	Llangefni Town	3–0	Mynydd Isa
10	Llanrug United	3–5	Llanelli
11	Nefyn United	1–3	Caernarfon Town
12	NEWI Cefn Druids	3–0	Holyhead Hotspur
13	Newport YMCA	2–1	Carmarthen Town
14	Newtown	2–1 (aet)	Maesteg Park
15	Rhyl	1–0	Port Talbot Town
16	Tywyn & Bryncrug	1–3 (aet)	Welshpool Town

== Fourth round ==
Matches played on 2 February 2008.

Tie no	Home team	Score	Away team
1	Aberystwyth Town	0–0	Bangor City
Bangor City won 3–2 on penalties
2	Bryntirion Athletic	1–2	Welshpool Town
3	Gap Queens Park	2–0	Caerleon
4	Guilsfield	1–0	Caernarfon Town
5	Haverfordwest County	1–2	Rhyl
6	NEWI Cefn Druids	0–0	ENTO Aberaman Athletic
NEWI Cefn Druids won 5–3 on penalties
7	Newport YMCA	0–0	Llangefni Town
Newport YMCA won 4–3 on penalties
8	Newtown	1–2	Llanelli

== Quarter-finals ==
Matches were played on 1 March 2008 and 2 March 2008.

Tie no	Home team	Score	Away team
1	Guilsfield	0–6	Bangor City
2	NEWI Cefn Druids	3-6 (aet)	Llanelli
3	Newport YMCA	3–2	Welshpool Town
4	Rhyl	3–2	Gap Queens Park

== Semi-finals ==
The matches were originally scheduled to be played on the weekend of 29 March 2008, but the Newport YMCA v Bangor City tie was postponed due to a waterlogged pitch. It was eventually played Newtown on the following Saturday. The other tie was played at Aberystwyth Town.

Tie no	Home team	Score	Away team
1	Newport YMCA	1–3	Bangor City
2	Rhyl	2–5	Llanelli

== Final ==
4 May 2008
16:05

Bangor City	4–2 (a.e.t.)	Llanelli
Stott 20'; Seargeant 90'; Limbert 97' (pen.); Noon 99'		Swanick 48' (o.g.); R. Griffiths 56'

Latham Park, Newtown
Attendance: 1,510
Referee: Phil Southall (South Wales)

Bangor City	Llanelli
