= 2011–12 Welsh Football League Division One =

MacWhirter Welsh League Division One
- Season: 2011–12
- Champions: Cambrian & Clydach Vale
- Promoted: Cambrian & Clydach Vale
- Relegated: Caerau (Ely); Cardiff Corinthians; Cwmaman Institute
- Matches: 240
- Goals: 821 (3.42 per match)
- Biggest home win: Cambrian & Clydach Vale 8–0 West End; 28 April 2012
- Biggest away win: Caerau (Ely) 1–7 Cambrian & Clydach Vale; 22 October 2011; Cwmaman Institute 1–7 Goytre United; 10 April 2012
- Highest scoring: Caerau (Ely) 4–7 Haverfordwest County; 3 March 2012

The 2011–12 Welsh Football League Division One began on 12 August 2011 and ended on 12 May 2012.

== Team changes from 2010–11 ==
Afan Lido were promoted to the Welsh Premier League.

Haverfordwest County were relegated from the Welsh Premier League.

AFC Porth, Cwmaman Institute and Ton Pentre were promoted from the Welsh Football League Division Two.

Caldicot Town, Garden Village, Penrhiwceiber Rangers were relegated to the Welsh Football League Division Two.

== League table ==
Pos	Team	Pld	W	D	L	GF	GA	GD	Pts	Relegation
1	Cambrian & Clydach Vale (C)	30	16	10	4	78	25	+53	58	
2	Taff's Well	30	16	4	10	60	42	+18	52	
3	Haverfordwest County	30	15	7	8	58	43	+15	52	
4	Bryntirion Athletic	30	16	3	11	52	43	+9	51	
5	AFC Porth	30	13	9	8	54	36	+18	48	
6	Barry Town	30	12	10	8	48	37	+11	46	Withdrew from the league
7	Goytre United	30	12	8	10	71	55	+16	44	
8	Bridgend Town	30	13	5	12	50	41	+9	44	
9	Ton Pentre	30	9	16	5	48	40	+8	43	
10	Pontardawe Town	30	11	9	10	48	53	−5	42	
11	West End	30	11	5	14	53	62	−9	38	
12	Cwmbran Celtic	30	12	2	16	32	54	−22	38	
13	Aberaman Athletic	30	8	9	13	46	55	−9	33	
14	Cwmaman Institute (R)	30	7	8	15	36	59	−23	29	Relegation to Welsh League Division Two
15	Cardiff Corinthians (R)	30	6	10	14	50	67	−17	28	Relegation to Welsh League Division Two
16	Caerau (Ely) (R)	30	4	3	23	37	109	−72	15	Relegation to Welsh League Division Two

Source: Welsh Football League
Rules for classification: 1) points; 2) goal difference; 3) number of goals scored.
(C) Champions; (R) Relegated

== Results ==
Home \ Away	POR	ABE	BAR	BRI	BRY	CAE	CCV	CAR	CWI	CMC	GOU	HAV	PON	TAF	TON	WES
AFC Porth		3–1	4–0	0–1	3–1	2–0	0–3	5–2	2–0	4–0	1–3	1–0	2–2	1–1	2–2	1–1
Aberaman Athletic	1–1		1–1	1–1	0–2	2–0	0–3	3–1	1–2	0–1	3–3	2–2	0–2	1–3	1–1	2–4
Barry Town	2–1	1–1		0–1	1–3	6–0	0–0	2–1	4–0	0–2	1–1	1–2	2–0	1–2	0–0	3–1
Bridgend Town	0–3	2–2	3–4		0–1	0–2	0–0	3–1	3–0	5–0	1–4	1–1	2–1	0–1	0–2	1–0
Bryntirion Athletic	1–1	1–0	0–2	2–0		4–1	0–3	4–1	1–1	2–0	3–2	0–1	0–1	0–2	2–2	2–1
Caerau (Ely)	3–7	3–5	0–1	1–5	2–6		1–7	3–2	2–2	1–2	0–3	4–7	1–1	1–5	0–4	0–2
Cambrian & Clydach Vale	0–0	1–2	1–3	2–3	4–0	8–1		0–0	3–1	3–1	6–3	0–2	4–0	2–0	1–1	8–0
Cardiff Corinthians	1–2	0–3	3–3	0–4	0–2	0–2	1–1		5–1	2–0	4–3	0–2	3–3	4–1	2–2	3–3
Cwmaman Institute	1–2	1–0	1–2	0–3	1–3	5–0	1–1	1–1		2–0	1–7	2–1	0–1	0–2	3–3	0–2
Cwmbran Celtic	1–0	0–1	1–0	2–1	1–0	3–1	0–3	1–3	1–3		2–2	0–2	1–1	0–3	3–4	0–2
Goytre United	1–1	3–2	2–0	1–2	5–2	0–2	2–2	3–3	3–2	1–2		2–0	0–1	3–1	2–2	0–1
Haverfordwest County	2–0	4–0	2–2	1–0	2–1	3–2	1–3	2–2	3–1	2–1	1–1		7–0	3–4	0–0	1–1
Pontardawe Town	2–1	4–1	2–2	1–0	3–2	6–1	0–5	2–2	1–1	2–4	0–3	3–0		1–3	5–0	2–2
Taff's Well	1–1	0–2	1–1	3–2	0–1	1–7	1–1	1–2	0–1	3–0	2–3	3–1	2–1		0–3	4–1
Ton Pentre	2–1	2–2	1–1	2–2	0–1	0–0	1–1	3–1	1–1	0–1	3–2	1–2	0–0	3–2		3–0
West End	1–2	3–7	0–2	3–4	3–5	4–2	0–2	2–0	1–1	1–2	4–3	5–1	2–0	1–2	2–0	

Source: Welsh Football League
Legend: Blue = home team win; Yellow = draw; Red = away team win.
