= 2013–14 Welsh Football League Division One =

- Season: 2013–14
- Teams: 16
- Matches played: 240
- Goals scored: 801 (3.34 per match)
- Biggest home win: Aberbargoed Buds 7 - 0 West End 23 April 2014
- Biggest away win: West End 1 - 7 Pen-y-Bont 8 March 2014
- Highest scoring: Monmouth Town 7 - 1 Cwmbran Celtic 9 April 2014; Pen-y-Bont 6 - 2 Caerau (Ely) 5 April 2014; West End 1 - 7 Pen-y-Bont 8 March 2014; West End 2 - 6 Monmouth Town 26 APril 2014

== Welsh Football League Division One ==
This league known as the Nathanielcars.co.uk Welsh League Division One for sponsorship reasons, is a football league in Wales. This is the top division of football in South Wales and the second tier of the Welsh Football League.

The reigning champions are West End. However, they were not promoted to Welsh Premier League as they did not meet the necessary ground criteria.

Pen-y-Bont was formed in 2013 following the merger of Bridgend Town F.C. and Bryntirion Athletic F.C.

=== Promotion and relegation ===
Teams promoted from 2012–13 Welsh Football League Division Two

- Goytre - Champions
- Aberbargoed Buds - 2nd Position
- Caerau (Ely) - 3rd Position

Teams relegated from 2012–13 Welsh Premier League

- None

=== Stadia and Locations ===
Location of teams in the 2013–14 Welsh Football League Division One

Club	Stadium	Location	Capacity
Aberbargoed Buds	The Recreational Ground	Aberbargoed	-
Aberdare Town	Aberaman Park	Aberdare	3,000
AFC Porth	Dinas Park	Porth	-
Caerau (Ely)	Cwrt-yr-Ala	Ely, Cardiff	-
Cambrian & Clydach Vale	King George V	Clydach Vale	-
Cwmbran Celtic	Celtic Park	Cwmbran	150
Goytre	Plough Road	Penperlleni	-
Goytre United	Glenhafod Park Stadium	Goytre	4,000
Haverfordwest County	Bridge Meadow Stadium	Haverfordwest	2,000
Monmouth Town	Chippenham Sports Ground	Monmouth	300 standing in covered grandstand
Pen-y-Bont	Bryntirion Park	Bridgend	1,200 (85 seated)
Pontardawe Town	The Recreation Ground	Pontardawe	-
Taff's Well	Rhiw Dda'r	Taff's Well	-
Tata Steel	Tata Sports Ground	Port Talbot	100
Ton Pentre	Ynys Park	Ton Pentre	-
West End	Pryderi Park Stadium	Swansea	-

=== League table ===
Pos	Team	Pld	W	D	L	GF	GA	GD	Pts	Relegation
1	Monmouth Town (C)	30	21	2	7	78	33	+45	65	
2	Taff's Well	30	19	6	5	63	30	+33	63	
3	Pen-y-Bont	30	17	4	9	77	44	+33	55	
4	Haverfordwest County	30	16	7	7	59	37	+22	55	
5	Goytre	30	15	9	6	49	43	+6	54	
6	Cambrian & Clydach Vale	30	15	5	10	60	44	+16	50	
7	Caerau (Ely)	30	12	10	8	52	51	+1	46	
8	Aberdare Town	30	13	5	12	49	48	+1	44	
9	Goytre United	30	11	6	13	56	43	+13	39	
10	AFC Porth	30	10	9	11	48	49	−1	39	
11	Ton Pentre	30	9	11	10	36	47	−11	38	
12	Pontardawe Town	30	9	6	15	34	60	−26	33	
13	Cwmbran Celtic	30	7	5	18	40	58	−18	26	
14	Tata Steel (R)	30	6	7	17	29	65	−36	25	Relegation to Welsh League Division Two
15	Aberbargoed Buds (R)	30	4	8	18	35	65	−30	20	Relegation to Welsh League Division Two
16	West End (R)	30	5	2	23	36	84	−48	17	Relegation to Welsh League Division Two

Source: Welsh Football League
Rules for classification: 1) points; 2) goal difference; 3) number of goals scored.
(C) Champions; (R) Relegated
