= 2010–11 Welsh Football League Division One =

MacWhirter Welsh League Division One
- Season: 2010–11
- Champions: Bryntirion Athletic
- Promoted: Afan Lido
- Relegated: Caldicot Town; Garden Village; Penrhiwceiber Rangers
- Matches played: 240
- Goals scored: 843 (3.51 per match)
- Biggest home win: Bridgend Town 7–0 Caerau (Ely); 29 September 2010; West End 7–0 Penrhiwceiber Rangers; 30 October 2010; Caerau (Ely) 7–0 Cardiff Corinthians; 19 February 2011
- Biggest away win: Penrhiwceiber Rangers 0–7 Bridgend Town; 18 September 2010; Cwmbran Celtic 0–7 Bryntirion Athletic; 22 January 2011; Aberaman Athletic 0–7 Pontardawe Town; 2 February 2011
- Highest scoring: Taff's Well 5–4 Aberaman Athletic; 6 October 2010

The 2010–11 Welsh Football League Division One began on 1 September 2010 and ended on 28 May 2011. Bryntirion Athletic won the league by five points.

== Team changes from 2009–10 ==
Caerau (Ely), Cwmbran Celtic and Penrhiwceiber Rangers were promoted from the Welsh Football League Division Two.

Bettws, Caerleon, Dinas Powys, Ely Rangers and Ton Pentre were relegated to the Welsh Football League Division Two.

== League table ==
Pos	Team	Pld	W	D	L	GF	GA	GD	Pts	Promotion or relegation
1	Bryntirion Athletic (C)	30	23	1	6	76	27	+49	70	
2	Afan Lido (P)	30	20	5	5	63	28	+35	65	Promotion to Welsh Premier League
3	Cambrian & Clydach Vale	30	17	6	7	68	37	+31	57	
4	Pontardawe Town	30	15	6	9	54	44	+10	51	
5	Caerau (Ely)	30	15	4	11	66	52	+14	49	
6	Bridgend Town	30	14	5	11	60	47	+13	47	
7	West End	30	13	6	11	57	47	+10	45	
8	Cardiff Corinthians	30	12	4	14	58	52	+6	40	
9	Taff's Well	30	12	3	15	47	57	−10	39	
10	Aberaman Athletic	30	12	3	15	58	74	−16	39	
11	Goytre United	30	10	8	12	47	53	−6	38	
12	Cwmbran Celtic	30	10	7	13	45	50	−5	37	
13	Barry Town	30	9	8	13	39	55	−16	35	
14	Caldicot Town (R)	30	8	3	19	37	48	−11	27	Relegation to Welsh League Division Two
15	Garden Village (R)	30	6	7	17	41	75	−34	25	Relegation to Welsh League Division Two
16	Penrhiwceiber Rangers (R)	30	4	4	22	27	97	−70	16	Relegation to Welsh League Division Two

Source: Welsh Football League
Rules for classification: 1) points; 2) goal difference; 3) number of goals scored.
(C) Champions; (P) Promoted; (R) Relegated

== Results ==
Home \ Away	ABE	AFA	BAR	BRI	BRY	CAE	CAL	CCV	CAR	CMC	GAR	GOU	PNR	PON	TAF	WES
Aberaman Athletic		2–1	1–1	0–0	0–1	0–2	2–1	1–3	3–4	0–2	4–3	4–3	5–2	0–7	4–1	5–0
Afan Lido	5–1		2–2	1–1	1–0	3–0	3–1	0–0	2–1	1–1	3–0	1–0	3–1	1–3	0–1	2–1
Barry Town	2–0	0–2		2–3	6–0	2–1	0–2	1–3	1–0	2–2	3–3	1–0	3–1	3–3	1–0	1–1
Bridgend Town	5–3	0–3	2–0		0–1	7–0	1–0	3–2	3–1	3–0	3–0	0–3	3–2	0–1	3–4	3–1
Bryntirion Athletic	5–0	2–1	6–1	3–0		5–1	2–0	2–3	3–0	3–0	1–0	2–0	4–1	4–1	2–0	0–1
Caerau (Ely)	1–3	1–4	2–0	6–1	0–1		2–1	2–2	7–0	0–0	6–0	3–2	4–0	2–2	4–1	1–4
Caldicot Town	0–3	0–2	1–0	3–0	1–4	1–2		1–1	2–1	2–3	5–1	4–0	4–0	1–2	0–3	2–3
Cambrian & Clydach Vale	6–0	3–1	4–0	2–2	0–3	2–1	1–0		3–2	0–2	4–1	7–1	3–0	1–1	3–0	0–3
Cardiff Corinthians	2–3	1–2	5–0	3–1	3–4	2–0	0–0	2–0		1–2	5–1	2–2	0–0	4–0	4–2	2–0
Cwmbran Celtic	3–0	1–2	1–2	0–0	0–7	3–3	2–0	1–2	1–1		2–0	0–1	3–0	1–3	6–0	1–2
Garden Village	3–4	0–3	0–2	1–5	1–0	1–3	5–1	2–0	1–5	0–0		4–4	0–0	1–1	0–3	3–1
Goytre United	1–1	0–3	3–1	2–1	1–1	1–2	2–0	1–1	2–1	3–1	0–1		3–1	1–2	2–2	3–2
Penrhiwceiber Rangers	0–3	2–2	1–1	0–7	2–4	0–4	0–3	0–6	1–5	0–5	1–4	0–2		2–1	2–1	4–1
Pontardawe Town	2–1	1–4	0–0	1–2	0–4	0–2	1–0	0–3	3–0	5–0	2–1	2–1	4–1		2–0	1–1
Taff's Well	5–4	1–3	2–1	2–1	3–0	0–2	2–1	1–2	3–0	3–0	1–1	1–1	2–3	1–2		2–1
West End	3–1	1–2	4–0	0–0	0–2	4–2	0–0	3–1	0–1	4–2	3–3	2–2	7–0	2–1	2–0	

Source: Welsh Football League
Legend: Blue = home team win; Yellow = draw; Red = away team win.
