= 2012–13 Welsh Football League Division One =

MacWhirter Welsh League Division One
- Season: 2012–13
- Champions: West End
- Relegated: Tata Steel; Cardiff Corinthians; Barry Town
- Matches: 240
- Goals: 821 (3.42 per match)
- Biggest home win: Tata Steel 0–8 Haverfordwest County; 23 April 2013
- Biggest away win: Barry Town 7–2 Goytre United; 15 September 2012
- Highest scoring: Bryntirion Athletic 3–7 West End; 2 February 2013

The 2012–13 Welsh Football League Division One began on 10 August 2012 and ended on 18 May 2013.

== Team changes from 2011–12 ==
Aberaman Athletic changed name to Aberdare Town.

Monmouth Town, Tata Steel and Caerleon were promoted from the Welsh Football League Division Two.

Caerau (Ely), Cardiff Corinthians, Cwmaman Institute were relegated to the Welsh Football League Division Two.

Barry Town withdrew from the division and were adopted to the Welsh Football League Division Three under name Barry Town United.

== League table ==
Pos	Team	Pld	W	D	L	GF	GA	GD	Pts	Relegation
1	West End (C)	28	18	4	6	64	29	+35	58	
2	Cambrian & Clydach Vale	28	17	5	6	56	26	+30	56	
3	Taff's Well	28	14	7	7	57	39	+18	49	
4	Haverfordwest County	28	13	8	7	63	35	+28	47	
5	Aberdare Town	28	13	8	7	45	35	+10	47	
6	AFC Porth	28	13	7	8	39	34	+5	46	
7	Monmouth Town	28	13	6	9	54	43	+11	45	
8	Bryntirion Athletic	28	10	9	9	38	40	−2	39	Merged with Bridgend Town to form Pen-y-Bont
9	Ton Pentre	28	9	9	10	39	39	0	36	
10	Pontardawe Town	28	10	5	13	34	39	−5	35	
11	Goytre United	28	10	4	14	33	51	−18	34	
12	Cwmbran Celtic	28	9	5	14	41	52	−11	32	
13	Bridgend Town	28	8	7	13	28	51	−23	31	Merged with Bryntirion Athletic to form Pen-y-Bont
14	Tata Steel	28	5	6	17	28	61	−33	21	
15	Caerleon (R)	28	1	4	23	18	63	−45	7	Relegation to Welsh League Division Two

Source: Welsh Football League
Rules for classification: 1) points; 2) goal difference; 3) number of goals scored.
(C) Champions; (R) Relegated
