= 2009–10 Welsh Football League Division One =

MacWhirter Welsh League Division One
- Season: 2009–10
- Champions: Goytre United
- Relegated: Ton Pentre, Ely Rangers, Bettws, Dinas Powys, Caerleon
- Goals scored: 1,066
- Average goals/game: 3.48
- Biggest home win: Afan Lido 9–1 Dinas Powys; 24 March 2010
- Biggest away win: Caerleon 0–6 Goytre United; 29 August 2009
- Highest scoring: Afan Lido 9–1 Dinas Powys; 24 March 2010

The 2009–10 Welsh Football League Division One began on 15 August 2009 and ended on 22 May 2010. Goytre United won the league by one point.

== Team changes from 2008–09 ==
West End, Ely Rangers and Garden Village were promoted from the Welsh Football League Division Two.

Cwmbran Town, Croesyceiliog and Newport YMCA were relegated to the Welsh Football League Division Two.

== League table ==
Pos	Team	Pld	W	D	L	GF	GA	GD	Pts	Relegation
1	Goytre United (C)	34	19	12	3	86	47	+39	69	
2	Cambrian & Clydach Vale	34	19	11	4	73	42	+31	68	
3	Afan Lido	34	19	6	9	74	37	+37	63	
4	Caldicot Town	34	16	7	11	78	54	+24	55	
5	Bryntirion Athletic	34	15	9	10	67	60	+7	54	
6	Taff's Well	34	15	5	14	72	60	+12	50	
7	Barry Town	34	12	13	9	46	41	+5	49	
8	Pontardawe Town	34	13	8	13	59	56	+3	47	
9	Bridgend Town	34	12	9	13	57	55	+2	45	
10	Aberaman Athletic	34	12	8	14	56	68	−12	44	
11	West End	34	12	8	14	62	84	−22	44	
12	Cardiff Corinthians	34	12	7	15	63	69	−6	43	
13	Garden Village	34	12	6	16	46	52	−6	42	
14	Ton Pentre (R)	34	11	8	15	56	65	−9	41	Relegation to Welsh League Division Two
15	Ely Rangers (R)	34	10	6	18	46	67	−21	36	Relegation to Welsh League Division Two
16	Bettws (R)	34	9	9	16	38	59	−21	36	Relegation to Welsh League Division Two
17	Dinas Powys (R)	34	9	4	21	50	83	−33	31	Relegation to Welsh League Division Two
18	Caerleon (R)	34	8	6	20	37	67	−30	30	Relegation to Welsh League Division Two

Source: Welsh Football League
Rules for classification: 1) points; 2) goal difference; 3) number of goals scored.
(C) Champions; (R) Relegated

== Results ==
Home \ Away	ABE	AFA	BAR	BET	BRI	BRY	CAE	CAL	CCV	CAR	DIN	ELY	GAR	GOU	PON	TAF	TON	WES
Aberaman Athletic		0–0	0–2	1–1	4–0	2–2	1–0	1–0	2–6	2–4	1–2	5–3	2–4	2–2	3–1	3–2	1–1	1–1
Afan Lido	2–0		2–0	2–1	1–3	1–2	3–0	2–1	1–1	2–0	9–1	4–0	1–0	1–2	2–1	7–1	1–0	5–0
Barry Town	2–2	2–0		3–0	1–2	3–2	1–3	0–0	1–3	2–0	1–1	1–1	1–2	2–2	0–0	2–1	2–2	1–1
Bettws	1–1	1–1	1–0		2–0	2–2	2–0	2–3	0–2	1–3	2–0	2–3	3–1	2–2	0–3	1–0	0–0	1–5
Bridgend Town	3–2	2–2	0–1	1–2		1–1	0–0	2–0	0–2	4–1	2–0	0–1	2–2	1–1	1–2	2–4	2–0	4–0
Bryntirion Athletic	3–1	2–1	1–1	2–0	1–1		2–0	0–1	3–4	2–2	2–1	2–1	3–0	1–3	0–1	0–2	3–1	1–2
Caerleon	2–3	3–0	1–2	1–0	3–1	3–2		1–3	1–1	3–0	2–1	2–1	2–2	0–6	1–3	0–0	1–3	2–3
Caldicot Town	5–2	1–4	1–1	4–1	4–4	3–3	3–1		3–0	5–2	6–0	3–0	0–1	1–3	1–2	0–3	3–2	7–1
Cambrian & Clydach Vale	2–0	1–1	0–0	2–2	1–1	1–2	3–1	3–3		3–1	1–0	1–1	2–0	1–2	3–1	3–1	1–2	1–1
Cardiff Corinthians	2–1	1–3	2–0	3–0	3–2	2–2	2–0	2–2	2–5		4–2	1–2	1–1	0–3	2–2	1–2	3–0	4–0
Dinas Powys	1–2	1–1	1–3	5–0	1–2	2–4	3–1	0–3	2–3	3–1		0–5	3–1	1–3	2–1	2–1	4–3	1–3
Ely Rangers	0–1	1–2	0–1	0–0	4–1	5–2	2–0	3–2	0–3	0–4	1–1		1–3	1–3	1–3	0–4	0–4	4–2
Garden Village	1–2	2–1	2–1	1–0	0–4	1–2	2–0	0–2	2–4	1–2	3–1	3–0		1–2	2–1	1–1	0–0	0–0
Goytre United	3–0	2–1	1–1	3–2	5–1	3–4	1–1	1–1	1–1	5–2	1–0	1–1	1–0		6–3	4–4	0–0	3–4
Pontardawe Town	4–0	1–3	2–3	3–3	2–0	2–0	1–1	0–1	0–2	2–2	3–1	3–1	3–1	1–1		0–4	3–2	2–2
Taff's Well	1–4	1–4	1–2	1–2	1–1	1–2	4–0	5–3	1–2	3–2	3–1	0–0	2–1	4–1	1–0		4–3	7–1
Ton Pentre	1–3	1–3	1–0	0–1	0–4	4–4	4–0	1–3	1–1	2–0	3–3	2–1	0–4	0–5	2–1	2–1		6–1
West End	4–1	2–1	3–3	1–0	1–3	2–3	2–1	1–0	3–4	2–2	2–3	1–2	2–1	2–4	2–2	3–1	2–3	

Source: Welsh Football League
Legend: Blue = home team win; Yellow = draw; Red = away team win.
