= 2016–17 Welsh Football League Division One =

Welsh Football League Division One
- Season: 2016–17
- Dates: 13 August 2016 – 6 May 2017
- Champions: Barry Town United
- Promoted: Barry Town United
- Relegated: Caldicot Town; Risca United
- Matches: 240
- Goals: 833 (3.47 per match)

The 2016–17 Welsh Football League Division One (known as the Nathaniel Cars Welsh Football League Division One for sponsorship reasons) was the 2016–17 season of the top football league in South Wales. Together with its North Wales counterpart, the Cymru Alliance, the 16-team division forms the second tier of the Welsh football league system, one level below the nationwide Welsh Premier League. The season began on 13 August 2016 and concluded on 6 May 2017.

On 18 April 2017, Barry Town United defeated Goytre United 3–0 to clinch promotion to the Welsh Premier League for the 2017–18 season.

== Teams ==
Locations of the 2016–17 Welsh Football League Division One teams

Cardiff Metropolitan University were champions in the previous season and were promoted to the 2016–17 Welsh Premier League; they were replaced by Haverfordwest County and Port Talbot Town who were both relegated from the 2015–16 Welsh Premier League.

Aberbargoed Buds, Aberdare Town, Briton Ferry Llansawel and Garden Village were all relegated to 2016–17 Welsh Football League Division Two; they were replaced by Caldicot Town, Cwmbran Celtic and Undy Athletic who were all promoted from Division Two the previous season.

=== Stadia and locations ===
| Team | Location | Stadium |
|---|---|---|
| Afan Lido | Aberavon | Marston Stadium |
| Barry Town United | Barry | Jenner Park |
| Caerau (Ely) | Ely | Cwrt-yr-Ala |
| Caldicot Town | Caldicot | Jubilee Way |
| Cambrian & Clydach Vale | Clydach Vale | King George's New Field |
| Cwmbran Celtic | Cwmbran | Celtic Park |
| Goytre | Penperlleni | Plough Road |
| Goytre United | Goytre | Glenhafod Park Stadium |
| Haverfordwest County | Haverfordwest | Bridge Meadow Stadium |
| Monmouth Town | Monmouth | Chippenham Sports Ground |
| Pen-y-Bont | Bridgend | Kymco Stadium |
| Port Talbot Town | Port Talbot | Victoria Road |
| Risca United | Risca | CCB Centre for Sporting Excellence |
| Taff's Well | Taff's Well | Rhiw Dda'r |
| Ton Pentre | Ton Pentre | Ynys Park |
| Undy Athletic | Undy | The Causeway |

== League table ==
| Pos | Team | Pld | W | D | L | GF | GA | GD | Pts | Promotion or relegation |
|---|---|---|---|---|---|---|---|---|---|---|
| 1 | Barry Town United (C, P) | 30 | 20 | 6 | 4 | 69 | 18 | +51 | 66 | Promotion to the Welsh Premier League |
| 2 | Pen-y-Bont | 30 | 19 | 4 | 7 | 73 | 41 | +32 | 61 | |
| 3 | Goytre | 30 | 18 | 4 | 8 | 80 | 49 | +31 | 58 | |
| 4 | Haverfordwest County | 30 | 16 | 6 | 8 | 55 | 47 | +8 | 54 | |
| 5 | Caerau (Ely) | 30 | 13 | 9 | 8 | 57 | 50 | +7 | 48 | |
| 6 | Cwmbran Celtic | 30 | 14 | 3 | 13 | 60 | 50 | +10 | 45 | |
| 7 | Undy Athletic | 30 | 13 | 2 | 15 | 53 | 53 | 0 | 41 | |
| 8 | Afan Lido (Note: Afan Lido were deducted three points.) | 30 | 13 | 5 | 12 | 46 | 49 | −3 | 41 | |
| 9 | Taff's Well | 30 | 12 | 4 | 14 | 40 | 48 | −8 | 40 | |
| 10 | Goytre United | 30 | 10 | 9 | 11 | 44 | 37 | +7 | 39 | |
| 11 | Cambrian & Clydach Vale | 30 | 10 | 7 | 13 | 41 | 49 | −8 | 37 | |
| 12 | Ton Pentre | 30 | 10 | 6 | 14 | 51 | 61 | −10 | 36 | |
| 13 | Port Talbot Town | 30 | 10 | 5 | 15 | 41 | 57 | −16 | 35 | |
| 14 | Monmouth Town | 30 | 9 | 6 | 15 | 49 | 74 | −25 | 33 | |
| 15 | Caldicot Town (R) | 30 | 7 | 2 | 21 | 36 | 65 | −29 | 23 | Relegation to Welsh League Division Two |
| 16 | Risca United (R) | 30 | 6 | 2 | 22 | 38 | 85 | −47 | 20 | Relegation to Welsh League Division Two |

Source: Welsh Football League, Soccerway
Rules for classification: 1) Points; 2) Goal difference; 3) Goals scored; 4) Matches won; 5) Play-off.
(C) Champions; (P) Promoted; (R) Relegated

== Results ==
| Home \ Away | AFA | BAR | CAE | CAL | CCV | CMC | GOA | GOU | HAV | MON | PYB | PTA | RIS | TAF | TON | UND |
|---|---|---|---|---|---|---|---|---|---|---|---|---|---|---|---|---|
| Afan Lido | — | 1–2 | 1–0 | 2–0 | 0–1 | 4–0 | 0–5 | 1–1 | 1–2 | 4–3 | 1–1 | 0–1 | 2–1 | 0–1 | 1–0 | 2–2 |
| Barry Town United | 3–0 | — | 2–2 | 5–2 | 1–0 | 0–0 | 1–2 | 3–0 | 2–0 | 2–0 | 1–1 | 4–1 | 11–0 | 2–0 | 6–0 | 2–0 |
| Caerau (Ely) | 3–1 | 1–1 | — | 0–5 | 1–0 | 2–2 | 4–1 | 1–0 | 5–5 | 1–0 | 5–1 | 2–0 | 6–1 | 2–1 | 1–1 | 4–2 |
| Caldicot Town | 1–3 | 1–3 | 1–0 | — | 2–3 | 0–4 | 3–4 | 1–0 | 2–3 | 0–1 | 0–1 | 0–1 | 1–1 | 2–1 | 2–1 | 0–3 |
| Cambrian & Clydach Vale | 1–1 | 0–1 | 1–1 | 0–1 | — | 1–3 | 1–3 | 3–3 | 3–1 | 1–1 | 1–3 | 2–2 | 1–3 | 0–3 | 0–0 | 1–2 |
| Cwmbran Celtic | 6–0 | 2–1 | 6–4 | 3–4 | 1–3 | — | 2–1 | 1–1 | 0–3 | 7–1 | 1–5 | 2–0 | 3–0 | 4–0 | 1–0 | 2–0 |
| Goytre | 2–0 | 1–0 | 1–1 | 4–1 | 3–4 | 2–1 | — | 2–2 | 5–1 | 5–2 | 3–0 | 2–1 | 2–2 | 2–4 | 3–4 | 4–1 |
| Goytre United | 2–4 | 1–0 | 0–0 | 0–0 | 1–2 | 0–2 | 1–3 | — | 1–2 | 7–0 | 0–2 | 3–0 | 0–1 | 0–0 | 5–0 | 0–3 |
| Haverfordwest County | 0–4 | 0–0 | 1–2 | 2–0 | 1–0 | 3–1 | 2–2 | 1–1 | — | 1–0 | 1–4 | 6–2 | 1–0 | 0–0 | 1–1 | 2–1 |
| Monmouth Town | 1–2 | 1–3 | 3–1 | 4–1 | 2–2 | 1–3 | 2–1 | 1–1 | 2–4 | — | 0–5 | 2–2 | 4–2 | 1–1 | 4–1 | 6–1 |
| Pen-y-Bont | 0–3 | 0–0 | 5–2 | 2–1 | 3–1 | 5–2 | 2–1 | 1–2 | 1–3 | 6–1 | — | 1–0 | 5–1 | 1–0 | 4–1 | 5–0 |
| Port Talbot Town | 4–0 | 0–3 | 1–1 | 2–1 | 2–1 | 3–0 | 1–4 | 2–3 | 2–1 | 0–1 | 1–1 | — | 4–2 | 1–0 | 5–4 | 1–2 |
| Risca United | 2–4 | 0–3 | 0–2 | 3–2 | 1–2 | 2–1 | 3–5 | 0–4 | 0–2 | 1–3 | 1–3 | 4–0 | — | 0–1 | 1–2 | 3–2 |
| Taff's Well | 1–1 | 0–2 | 3–0 | 3–0 | 1–2 | 1–0 | 1–5 | 0–2 | 2–1 | 3–0 | 1–3 | 2–1 | 3–2 | — | 2–4 | 3–1 |
| Ton Pentre | 0–2 | 1–3 | 2–0 | 3–2 | 2–3 | 2–0 | 2–1 | 1–2 | 1–2 | 1–1 | 3–2 | 1–1 | 4–1 | 6–0 | — | 2–2 |
| Undy Athletic | 3–1 | 1–2 | 2–3 | 3–0 | 0–1 | 1–0 | 0–1 | 0–1 | 2–3 | 5–1 | 4–0 | 2–0 | 2–0 | 3–2 | 3–1 | — |

Source: Welsh Football League
Legend: Blue = home team win; Yellow = draw; Red = away team win.
