= 2023–24 Welsh League Cup =

Nathaniel MG Cup

Tournament details
- Country: Wales
- Dates: 21 July 2023 – 20 January 2024
- Teams: 46

Final positions
- Champions: The New Saints
- Runners-up: Swansea City

The 2023–24 Welsh League Cup (known for sponsorship purposes as The Nathaniel MG Cup) is the 32nd season of the Welsh League cup competition, which was established in 1992. The reigning champions were Bala Town.

== Format ==
- 44 clubs in the Cymru Premier, Cymru North and Cymru South leagues entered the season's League Cup.
- Swansea City and Cardiff City were awarded the two wildcard spots for the current season.
- 2 teams from each of the Cymru North and Cymru South received byes into the second round - with those byes decided by being the first two clubs in each section of the competition to be drawn in the first round draw, These clubs joined the 12 clubs of the Cymru Premier plus the winners of the first round ties in the second round.

== First round ==
The draw for the first round was made on 27 June 2023 with matches taking place on the weekend of 21 July. Prestatyn Town and Gresford Athletic of the Cymru North and Caerau Ely and Trefelin in the Cymru South were drawn as the clubs receiving byes in to the second round

=== Northern ===
21 July 2023	Chirk AAA (2)	0–1	Denbigh Town (2)	Chirk, Wales
18:45		Report	Blackwell-Jones 43'	Stadium: Holyhead Road; Referee: Richard Lee Wright

21 July 2023	Ruthin Town (2)	3–2	Llandudno (2)	Ruthin, Wales
19:30	Davies 28'; Hughes-Hampson 58'; Morris 82'	Report	Holland 36'; Murtas 43'	Stadium: Memorial Playing Fields; Referee: Thomas Owen

22 July 2023	Buckley Town (2)	2–1	Mold Alexandra (2)	Buckley, Wales
14:30	Smith 18'; Littler 79'	Report	Durnell 72'	Stadium: The Globe; Referee: Rob Jenkins

22 July 2023	Holywell Town (2)	2–3	Bangor 1876 (2)	Holywell, Wales
14:30	Edwards 27' (pen.), 90+3' (pen.)	Report	McGonigle 65' (pen.); Hughes 68'; Edwards 85' (o.g.)	Stadium: Halkyn Road; Referee: Iwan Arwel Griffith

22 July 2023	Porthmadog (2)	4–2	Llanidloes Town (2)	Porthmadog, Wales
14:30	Cavanagh 48', 55', 56', 88'	Report	Smallwood 45+3', 61'	Stadium: Y Traeth; Referee: Mark James

22 July 2023	Caersws (2)	1–3	Guilsfield (2)	Caersws, Wales
14:30	Mitchell 11' (pen.)	Report	Evans 48'; Matthews 53', 85' (pen.)	Stadium: Recreation Ground; Referee: John Andrew Jones

=== Southern ===
21 July 2023	Baglan Dragons (2)	1–3	Afan Lido (2)	Baglan, Wales
18:30	Williams 70' (pen.)	Report	Griffiths 35', 76'; Webber 85'	Stadium: Evans Bevans Playing Fields; Referee: Ryan Kenny

21 July 2023	Abergavenny Town (2)	0–2	Briton Ferry Llansawel (2)	Abergavenny, Wales
19:30		Report	Walters 3', 24'	Stadium: Pen-y-Pound Stadium; Referee: Joshua Lewis Howells

21 July 2023	Cambrian & Clydach Vale (2)	2–2 (3–4 p)	Cardiff City	Clydach Vale, Wales
19:30	Parker 6'; Morgan 90+1'	Report	Jones 33' (o.g.); Ashford 44'	Stadium: M&P 3G; Referee: Alex McInch

21 July 2023	Llanelli Town (2)	1–0	Pontardawe Town (2)	Llanelli, Wales
19:30	Phipps 90+5' (pen.)	Report		Stadium: Stebonheath Park; Referee: Jordan Harman

22 July 2023	Carmarthen Town (2)	0–4	Swansea City	Carmarthen, Wales
14:30		Report	Morgan 27', 43'; Lloyd 31'; Nzingo 40'	Stadium: Richmond Park; Referee: Bryn Markham-Jones

22 July 2023	Cwmbran Celtic (2)	2–2 (0–3 p)	Taff's Well (2)	Cwmbran, Wales
14:30	Howells 90+4'; Hewitt 90+9'	Report	Daniels 51'; Treharne 54'	Stadium: Celtic Park; Referee: Benjamin Schofield

22 July 2023	Goytre United (2)	1–2	Llantwit Major (2)	Goytre, Wales
14:30	Watts 3' (pen.)	Report	Woolfenden 36', 73'	Stadium: Glenhafod Park Stadium; Referee: Ieuan Lewis

25 July 2023	Ammanford (2)	2–0	Abertillery Bluebirds (2)	Ammanford, Wales
19:45	Reed 50', 82'	Report		Stadium: Ammanford Recreation Ground; Referee: Tegid Richards

== Second round ==
=== Northern ===
4 August 2023	Ruthin Town (2)	0–4	Bala Town (1)	Ruthin, Wales
19:30		Report	Newell 57', 63', 88'; Peate 66'	Stadium: Memorial Playing Fields; Referee: Siôn Davies

4 August 2023	Prestatyn Town (2)	1–1 (4–1 p)	Flint Town United (2)	Prestatyn, Wales
19:30	Cahill 81'	Report	Brindley-Peagram 6'	Stadium: Bastion Road; Referee: Arthur Smallman

4 August 2023	Caernarfon Town (1)	2–2 (2–4 p)	Porthmadog (2)	Caernarfon, Wales
19:45	Davies 45'; Austin 63'	Report	Brookwell 32'; Owen 89'	Stadium: The Oval; Referee: Alex Livesey

5 August 2023	Bangor 1876 (2)	0–3	Gresford Athletic (2)	Bangor, Wales
14:30		Report	Edge 50'; Spridgeon 73'; Ozlu 80'	Stadium: Nantporth; Referee: Iolo Williams

5 August 2023	Buckley Town (2)	3–0	Denbigh Town (2)	Buckley, Wales
14:30	Hamilton 59' (pen.), 81'; Driscoll 61'	Report		Stadium: The Globe; Referee: Mark James

5 August 2023	Colwyn Bay (1)	5–0	Airbus UK Broughton (2)	Old Colwyn, Wales
14:30	Hill 13'; Turner 28'; Rushton 47'; Edwards 81'; Marsh-Hughes 88'	Report		Stadium: Llanelian Road; Referee: John Jones

5 August 2023	The New Saints (1)	2–1	Connah's Quay Nomads (1)	Oswestry, England
14:30	Williams 32'; Daniels 44'	Report	Bratley 12'	Stadium: Park Hall; Referee: Rob Jenkins

5 August 2023	Newtown (1)	1–1 (3–4 p)	Guilsfield (2)	Newtown, Wales
17:00	Oswell 12'	Report	Evans 47'	Stadium: Latham Park; Referee: Nicholas Pratt

=== Southern ===
4 August 2023	Briton Ferry Llansawel (2)	3–1	Llantwit Major (2)	Briton Ferry, Wales
19:30	Bull 28'; Brock 78' (80)	Report	Kimmins 24'	Stadium: Old Road; Referee: Joseph Gibson

4 August 2023	Llanelli Town (2)	1–4	Pontypridd United (1)	Llanelli, Wales
19:30	Johnson 9'	Report	Williams-Margetson 18'; Jones 28'; Knott 39'; Ahmun 48'	Stadium: Stebonheath Park; Referee: Ieuan Lewis

4 August 2023	Penybont (1)	1–1 (4–5 p)	Afan Lido (2)	Bridgend, Wales
19:45	Venables 45+4'	Report	McCreesh 19' (pen.)	Stadium: SDM Glass Stadium; Referee: Daniel Richardson

5 August 2023	Barry Town United (1)	1–2	Aberystwyth Town (1)	Barry, Wales
14:30	McLaggon 59'	Report	Darlington 70'; Kirkman 81'	Stadium: Jenner Park; Referee: Alex McInch

5 August 2023	Swansea City	3–1	Caerau (Ely) (2)	Briton Ferry, Wales
14:30	Bates 6'; Wilson 27'; Morgan 54'	Report	Williams 71'	Stadium: Old Road; Referee: Joshua Howells

5 August 2023	Taff's Well (2)	0–3	Cardiff Met University (1)	Taff's Well, Wales
14:30		Report	Lewis 28', 72'; Evans 59'	Stadium: Rhiw'r Ddar; Referee: Jordan Harman

5 August 2023	Trefelin (2)	2–2 (2–4 p)	Ammanford (2)	Cwmafan, Wales
14:30	Piper 65', 78' (pen.)	Report	Jones 45'; D. Thomas 90+9'	Stadium: Ynys Park; Referee: Thomas Bevan

6 August 2023	Haverfordwest County (1)	0–4	Cardiff City	Haverfordwest, Wales
14:30		Report	Ashford 14', 25', 47', 66'	Stadium: Bridge Meadow Stadium; Referee: Benjamin Williams

== Third round ==
=== Northern ===
19 September 2023	Buckley Town (2)	0–1	Gresford Athletic (2)	Buckley, Wales
19:30		Report	Ozlu 44'	Stadium: The Globe; Referee: Conor Charlton-Fleming

19 September 2023	Guilsfield (2)	1–0	Bala Town (1)	Guilsfield, Wales
19:45	Haycock 66'	Report		Stadium: Community Centre Ground; Referee: Siôn Peter Davies

19 September 2023	The New Saints (1)	4–1	Porthmadog (2)	Oswestry, England
19:45	Daniels 5'; Clark 39'; Dafydd 54'; Cieślewicz 90+4' (pen.)	Report	Cavanagh 9'	Stadium: Park Hall; Referee: Alex Livesey

3 October 2023	Prestatyn Town (2)	2–2 (4–1 p)	Colwyn Bay (1)	Prestatyn, Wales
19:45	Scoullar 49'; Clifton 50'	Report	Allshorn 41'; Turner 45+4'	Stadium: Bastion Road; Referee: Richard Wright

=== Southern ===
19 September 2023	Afan Lido (2)	0–4	Cardiff Met University (1)	Aberavon, Wales
19:30		Report	Vincent 17', 53', 71'; Evans 73'	Stadium: Lido Ground; Referee: Ryan Kenny

19 September 2023	Ammanford (2)	0–1	Briton Ferry Llansawel (2)	Ammanford, Wales
19:30		Report	Bowen 9' (pen.)	Stadium: Ammanford Recreation Ground; Referee: Benjamin Williams

19 September 2023	Swansea City	1–1 (5–3 p)	Cardiff City	Swansea, Wales
19:30	Cadogan 25'	Report	Evans 71'	Stadium: Swansea.com Stadium; Referee: Bryn Markham-Jones
	Penalties
	Congreve (penalty scored); Parker (penalty scored); Cadogan (penalty scored); Jenkins (penalty scored); Fletcher (penalty scored)		Crole (penalty scored); Johnson (penalty missed); Ashford (penalty scored); Giles (penalty scored)

19 September 2023	Aberystwyth Town (1)	0–1	Pontypridd United (1)	Aberystwyth, Wales
20:00		Report	Karadogan 90'	Stadium: Park Avenue; Referee: Alex McInch

== Quarter-finals ==
=== Northern ===
24 October 2023	The New Saints (1)	9–0	Gresford Athletic (2)	Oswestry, England
19:45	Baker 16', 27', 52' (pen.); Dafydd 39', 58'; Brennan 48'; Williams 77'; Cieślewicz 81'; Pask 90'	Report		Stadium: Park Hall; Referee: Nicholas Pratt

25 October 2023	Guilsfield (2)	1–1 (3–0 p)	Prestatyn Town (2)	Guilsfield, Wales
19:45	Knott 71'	Report	Pearson 3'	Stadium: Community Centre Ground

=== Southern ===
23 October 2023	Swansea City	6–0	Briton Ferry Llansawel (2)	Briton Ferry, Wales
19:45	Jenkins 7', 45+3'; Davies 40', 75'; Fletcher 78', 82'	Report		Stadium: Old Road Welfare Ground; Attendance: 1,028; Referee: Bryn Markham-Jones

19 December 2023	Cardiff Met University (1)	1–0	Pontypridd United (1)	Cardiff, Wales
	Evans 31'	Report		Stadium: Cyncoed Campus

== Semi-finals ==
3 January 2024	Swansea City	0–0 (5–4 p)	Cardiff Metropolitan University (1)
19:45		Report

9 January 2024	Guilsfield (2)	0–2	The New Saints (1)	Guilsfield, Wales
19:45			Williams 40', 75'	Stadium: Community Centre Ground

== Final ==
20 January 2024	The New Saints (1)	5–1	Swansea City	Barry, Wales
17:30	Brobbel 7'; Pask 19'; Young 50'; Cieślewicz 90+1', 90+3'	Report	Lloyd 58'	Stadium: Jenner Park Stadium; Attendance: 711; Referee: Mark Petch
