= 2015–16 Welsh Football League Division One =

Welsh Football League Division One
- Season: 2015–16
- Champions: Cardiff Metropolitan University
- Relegated: Garden Village; Briton Ferry Llansawel
- All statistics correct as of 3 August 2016.

The 2015-16 Welsh Football League Division One (referred to as Nathaniel Cars Welsh League Division One for sponsorship reasons) is current season of the top football league in South Wales. Mirroring its North Wales counterpart the Cymru Alliance, the 16-team division forms half of the second tier of the Welsh football league system and falls one level below the nationwide Welsh Premier League. The season began on Saturday 15 August 2015 and is set to conclude on Saturday 12 March 2016.

Clubs competing in Welsh Football League Division One are eligible for promotion to the Welsh Premier League for 2016–17, should they finish in the top two positions and achieve the league's Domestic Licence. Current champions Caerau Ely did not meet these criteria, allowing runners-up Haverfordwest County to be promoted instead.

== Clubs and stadia ==
Locations of association football teams in 2015–2016 Welsh Football League Division One

| Club | Stadium |
|---|---|
| Aberbargoed Buds | CCB Centre for Sporting Excellence |
| Aberdare Town | Aberaman Park |
| Afan Lido | Marston Stadium |
| Barry Town United | Jenner Park |
| Briton Ferry Llansawel | Old Road |
| Cardiff Metropolitan | Cyncoed Campus |
| Caerau Ely | Cwrt-yr-Ala |
| Cambrian & Clydach | King George's New Field |
| Garden Village | Stafford Common |
| Goytre AFC | Plough Road |
| Goytre United | Glenhafod Park |
| Monmouth Town | Monmouth Sports Ground |
| Penybont | Kymco Stadium |
| Risca United | CCB Centre for Sporting Excellence |
| Taffs Well | Rhiw Dda'r |
| Ton Pentre | Ynys Park |

== Promotion and relegation ==
=== Added to the division for 2015-16 ===
- Barry Town United (promoted)
- Aberbargoed Buds (promoted)
- Risca United (promoted)

=== Removed from the division for 2015-16 ===
- Haverfordwest County (promoted)
- Pontardawe Town (relegated)
- AFC Porth (relegated)
