= 2018–19 Welsh Football League Division One =

Welsh Football League Division One
- Season: 2018–19
- Dates: 10 Aug 2018 – 06 Apr 2019
- Champions: Penybont
- Relegated: Ton Pentre; Port Talbot Town; Goytre
- All statistics correct as of 15:40, 8 May 2019 (UTC).

The 2018–19 Welsh Football League Division One (known as the Nathaniel Cars Welsh Football League Division One for sponsorship reasons) was the 2018–19 season of the top football league in South Wales. The champions at the end of the season were Penybont.

Together with its North Wales counterpart, the Cymru Alliance, the 16-team division formed the second tier of the Welsh football league system, one level below the nationwide Welsh Premier League. The season began on 10 August 2018 and concluded in April 2019.

This was the last season as the 'Welsh League Division One' at Tier 2 with FAW Championship South & Mid instead being this level from the 2019–20 season. The First Division will instead be at Tier 3 level for the 2019–20 season.

== Teams ==
Locations of the 2018–19 Welsh Football League Division One teams

Llanelli Town were champions in the previous season and were promoted to the 2018–19 Welsh Premier League. There was no relegation from the Premier League to Division One.

Monmouth Town and Caerau (Ely) were relegated and replaced by the promoted teams from 2017-18 Welsh Football League Division Two. They were Llantwit Major, Pontypridd Town and Ammanford.

=== Stadia and locations ===
Team	Location	Stadium
Afan Lido	Aberavon	Marston Stadium
Ammanford	Ammanford	Manor Road
Briton Ferry Llansawel	Briton Ferry	Old Road
Cambrian & Clydach Vale	Clydach Vale	King George's New Field
Cwmamman United	Glanamman	Grenig Park
Cwmbran Celtic	Cwmbran	Celtic Park
Goytre	Penperlleni	Plough Road
Goytre United	Goytre	Glenhafod Park Stadium
Haverfordwest County	Haverfordwest	Bridge Meadow Stadium
Llantwit Major	Llantwit Major	Windmill Ground
Penybont	Bridgend	Kymco Stadium
Pontypridd Town	Pontypridd	USW Sport Park
Port Talbot Town	Port Talbot	Victoria Road
Taff's Well	Taff's Well	Rhiw Dda'r
Ton Pentre	Ton Pentre	Ynys Park
Undy Athletic	Undy	The Causeway

== League table ==
Pos	Team	Pld	W	D	L	GF	GA	GD	Pts	Promotion or relegation
1	Pen-y-Bont (C, P)	30	25	5	0	81	22	+59	80	Promotion to the Welsh Premier League
2	Cambrian & Clydach Vale	30	18	6	6	58	32	+26	60	
3	Haverfordwest County	30	16	6	8	69	34	+35	54	
4	Afan Lido	30	15	6	9	68	59	+9	51	
5	Goytre United	30	15	5	10	52	39	+13	50	
6	Cwmamman United	30	14	8	8	55	55	0	50	
7	Llantwit Major	30	14	6	10	46	37	+9	48	
8	Briton Ferry Llansawel	30	12	6	12	44	50	−6	42	
9	Ammanford	30	10	6	14	51	57	−6	36	
10	Cwmbran Celtic	30	10	6	14	49	57	−8	36	
11	Pontypridd Town	30	9	6	15	52	66	−14	33	
12	Undy Athletic	30	8	7	15	51	64	−13	31	
13	Port Talbot Town (R)	30	6	11	13	39	50	−11	29	Relegation to Welsh League Division Two
14	Taff's Well	30	7	4	19	33	62	−29	25	
15	Goytre (R)	30	6	6	18	39	65	−26	24	Relegation to Welsh League Division Two
16	Ton Pentre (R)	30	6	4	20	38	76	−38	22	Relegation to Welsh League Division Two

Rules for classification: 1) Points; 2) Goal difference; 3) Goals scored; 4) Matches won
(C) Champions; (P) Promoted; (R) Relegated

== Results ==
Home \ Away	AFA	AMM	BFL	CCV	CWU	CWC	GOA	GOU	HAV	LTM	PYB	PTY	PTA	TAF	TON	UND
Afan Lido	—	0–0	4–1	1–3	2–4	4–0	1–1	1–1	0–4	1–2	1–2	2–1	4–4	4–1	2–1	0–5
Ammanford	1–4	—	0–1	0–4	1–1	5–0	4–3	1–2	2–0	2–0	1–3	3–3	5–1	1–1	4–1	4–1
Briton Ferry Llansawel	0–1	2–1	—	1–2	2–2	1–1	0–2	1–0	0–3	1–1	2–2	2–2	3–2	3–2	5–0	0–2
Cambrian & Clydach Vale	1–2	1–1	0–1	—	3–3	2–0	3–1	1–0	2–1	1–1	1–2	3–2	1–0	5–1	3–0	2–1
Cwmamman United	3–2	1–0	0–1	2–1	—	2–2	4–2	2–0	3–2	2–1	0–9	4–2	0–0	2–3	3–4	3–5
Cwmbran Celtic	4–4	5–3	0–2	1–3	1–2	—	2–2	4–0	3–1	2–4	0–2	2–1	1–2	2–1	4–1	4–0
Goytre	1–4	0–4	4–2	1–1	0–2	2–0	—	1–4	2–2	1–4	2–3	2–1	1–1	1–0	0–1	1–1
Goytre United	3–0	1–0	3–2	1–2	1–1	0–0	2–1	—	3–1	0–1	1–5	0–1	4–1	2–1	1–1	3–3
Haverfordwest County	2–1	4–0	3–0	2–2	2–3	3–0	1–0	2–0	—	2–0	0–3	10–1	0–0	4–0	4–2	2–1
Llantwit Major	2–3	2–0	2–3	0–0	0–1	0–1	2–1	0–1	3–2	—	0–0	4–3	2–1	2–1	1–0	1–1
Pen-y-Bont	3–3	4–1	2–0	5–3	2–0	3–1	2–0	5–2	1–1	1–0	—	3–1	1–0	1–0	5–0	2–1
Pontypridd Town	1–2	5–0	5–1	0–1	1–1	0–2	3–2	0–2	1–5	1–1	0–3	—	1–1	1–4	1–0	2–1
Port Talbot Town	2–1	2–2	2–1	0–2	1–1	4–2	3–0	1–6	0–0	0–2	0–2	2–2	—	1–2	5–0	3–1
Taff's Well	1–3	0–2	1–1	0–3	1–0	0–3	2–4	0–3	0–1	1–2	1–1	0–2	1–0	—	1–4	3–3
Ton Pentre	4–5	4–1	1–2	0–2	1–2	1–1	4–0	0–2	0–4	1–4	0–3	1–4	0–0	0–2	—	3–3
Undy Athletic	2–5	1–2	0–3	2–0	3–1	2–1	2–1	0–4	1–1	3–2	0–1	2–4	1–1	1–2	2–3	—

Source: Welsh Football League
Legend: Blue = home team win; Yellow = draw; Red = away team win.
