= 2016–17 Welsh Football League Division Two =

Welsh Football League Division Two
- Season: 2016–17

The 2016-17 Welsh Football League Division Two had seen the following 16 teams participating:

- AFC Llwydcoed
- AFC Porth
- Aberbargoed Buds (relegated from Welsh Football League Division One)
- Aberdare Town (relegated from Welsh Football League Division One)
- Abergavenny Town (promoted from Welsh Football League Division Three)
- Ammanford
- Briton Ferry Llansawel (demoted from Welsh Football League Division One)
- Croesyceiliog
- Cwmamman United
- Dinas Powys
- Garden Village (relegated from Welsh Football League Division One)
- Llanelli Town
- Newport City (renamed from Llanwern FC)
- Pontardawe Town
- Pontypridd Town (promoted from Welsh Football League Division Three)
- West End

Llanelli Town made it the furthest out of any team in the division this season.
