= Welsh Football League Division One =

Nathanielcars.co.uk Welsh League Division One
- Founded: 1904
- Folded: 2020
- Country: Wales
- Number of clubs: 16
- Level on pyramid: 1 (1904–1992); 2 (1992–2019); 3 (2019–2020)
- Promotion to: Cymru South
- Relegation to: Welsh Football League Division Two
- Domestic cup(s): Welsh Cup; Welsh Football League Cup
- Last champions: Trefelin BGC (2019-20)
- Current: 2019–20 Welsh League Division One

The Welsh Football League Division One, known as the Nathanielcars.co.uk Welsh League First Division for sponsorship reasons, was a football league in South Wales. It formed the top division of the Welsh Football League and the second level of the Welsh football league system until the 2019–20 season when it was replaced by the Cymru South. From the 2019–20 season it operated at the third level of the Welsh football league system.

If the team which finished top of the Division had good enough ground facilities, it was promoted to the Welsh Premier League and was replaced by one of the two teams finishing bottom of the Premiership. If the Division champions' ground did not meet Premiership standards, then the team which finished second may have been promoted. The team which finished in bottom position was relegated to the Welsh Football League Division Two.

From its inception in 1904 it had always been the top flight of the Welsh League, or the Rhymney Valley League and Glamorgan League as it was known until 1912. This division changed its name on numerous occasions, which includes Premier Division and National Division.

In 1992 it became level two of the Welsh Football Pyramid following the creation of the Welsh Premier League.

In 2019 it became level three of the Welsh Football Pyramid following the creation of the Cymru South. It folded in 2020 after the Football Association of Wales took over the running of tier 3 leagues and the responsibility for tier 4 passed to regional football associations.

== Member clubs for the final 2019–20 season ==
Locations of teams in the 2019–20 Welsh Football League Division One season
- Aberbargoed Buds
- Abergavenny Town
- AFC Llwydcoed
- Bridgend Street
- Caldicot Town
- Croesyceiliog
- Dinas Powys
- Garden Village
- Goytre
- Monmouth Town
- Penydarren BGC
- Pontardawe Town
- Port Talbot Town
- Risca United
- Ton Pentre
- Trefelin BGC

== Top Division of the Welsh League (1904–1992) ==
Since its inception in 1904 it has always been the top flight of the Welsh League for the teams located in South Wales.
This division has changed its name on numerous occasions.

Seasons	Winner
Rhymney Valley League Division 1
1904–05	Aberdare
1905–06	Rogerstone
1906–07	Cwmaman
1907–08	Ton Pentre
1908–09	Aberdare
Glamorgan League Division 1
1909–10	Treharris
1910–11	Merthyr Town
1911–12	Aberdare
Welsh Football League Division 1
1912–13	Swansea Town Reserves
1913–14	Llanelli
1914–15	Ton Pentre
1915–1919	Not played due World War I
1919–20	Mid Rhondda
1920–21	Aberdare
1921–22	Porth
1922–23	Cardiff City Reserves
1923–24	Pontypridd FC
1924–25	Swansea Town Reserves
1925–26	Swansea Town Reserves
1926–27	Barry Town Reserves
1927–28	Newport County Reserves
1928–29	Cardiff City Reserves
1929–30	Llanelli
1930–31	Merthyr Town Reserves
1931–32	Lovell's Athletic
1932–33	Llanelli
1933–34	Swansea Town Reserves
1934–35	Swansea Town Reserves
1935–36	Swansea Town Reserves
1936–37	Newport County Reserves
1937–38	Lovell's Athletic
1938–39	Lovell's Athletic
1939–1945	Not played due World War II
1945–46	Lovell's Athletic
1946–47	Lovell's Athletic
1947–48	Lovell's Athletic
1948–49	Merthyr Town Reserves
1949–50	Merthyr Tydfil Reserves
1950–51	Swansea Town Reserves
1951–52	Merthyr Tydfil Reserves
1952–53	Ebbw Vale
1953–54	Pembroke Borough
1954–55	Newport County Reserves
1955–56	Pembroke Borough
1956–57	Haverfordwest County
1957–58	Ton Pentre
1958–59	Abergavenny Thursdays
1959–60	Abergavenny Thursdays
1960–61	Ton Pentre
1961–62	Swansea Town Reserves
1962–63	Swansea Town Reserves
1963–64	Swansea Town Reserves
Welsh Football League Premier Division
1964–65	Swansea Town Reserves
1965–66	Lovell's Athletic
1966–67	Cardiff City Reserves
1967–68	Cardiff City Reserves
1968–69	Bridgend Town
1969–70	Cardiff City Reserves
1970–71	Llanelli
1971–72	Cardiff City Reserves
1972–73	Bridgend Town
1973–74	Ton Pentre
1974–75	Newport County Reserves
1975–76	Swansea City Reserves
1976–77	Llanelli
1977–78	Llanelli
1978–79	Pontllanfraith
1979–80	Newport County Reserves
1980–81	Haverfordwest County
1981–82	Ton Pentre
1982–83	Barry Town
Welsh Football League National Division
1983–84	Barry Town
1984–85	Barry Town
1985–86	Barry Town
1986–87	Barry Town
1987–88	Ebbw Vale
1988–89	Barry Town
1989–90	Haverfordwest County
1990–91	Abergavenny Thursdays
1991–92	Abergavenny Thursdays

=== Performance by club ===
- 22 Clubs won Top Division of the Welsh League (1904–1992) in South Wales.

Club	Wins	Winning years
Swansea Town / City Reserves	12	1912–13, 1924–25, 1925–26, 1933–34, 1934–35, 1935–36, 1950–51, 1961–62, 1962–63, 1963–64, 1964–65, 1975–76
Lovell's Athletic	7	1931–32, 1937–38, 1938–39, 1945–46, 1946–47, 1947–48, 1965–66
Barry Town & Reserves	7	1926–27, 1982–83, 1983–84, 1984–85, 1985–86, 1986–87, 1988–89
Cardiff City Reserves	6	1922–23, 1928–29, 1966–67, 1967–68, 1969–70, 1971–72
Llanelli	6	1913–14, 1929–30, 1932–33, 1970–71, 1976–77, 1977–78
Ton Pentre	6	1907–08, 1914–15, 1957–58, 1960–61, 1973–74, 1981–82
Newport County Reserves	5	1927–28, 1936–37, 1954–55, 1974–75, 1979–80
Aberdare	4	1904–05, 1908–09, 1911–12, 1920–21
Abergavenny Thursdays	4	1958–59, 1959–60, 1990–91, 1991–92
Merthyr Town & Reserves	3	1910–11, 1930–31, 1948–49
Haverfordwest County	3	1956–57, 1980–81, 1989–90
Merthyr Tydfil Reserves	2	1949–50, 1951–52
Pembroke Borough	2	1953–54, 1955–56
Bridgend Town	2	1968–69, 1972–73
Ebbw Vale	2	1952–53, 1987–88
Rogerstone	1	1905–06
Cwmaman	1	1906–07
Treharris	1	1909–10
Mid Rhondda	1	1919–20
Porth	1	1921–22
Pontypridd FC	1	1923–24
Pontllanfraith	1	1978–79

== Welsh Football League Division One (1992–2019) ==
In 1992 it became level two of the Welsh Football Pyramid following the creation of the Welsh Premier League.

Seasons	Winner
Welsh Football League Division 1
1992–93	Ton Pentre
1993–94	Barry Town
1994–95	Briton Ferry Athletic
1995–96	Carmarthen Town
1996–97	Haverfordwest County
1997–98	Ton Pentre
1998–99	Ton Pentre
1999–00	Ton Pentre
2000–01	Ton Pentre
2001–02	Ton Pentre
2002–03	Bettws
2003–04	Llanelli
2004–05	Ton Pentre
2005–06	Goytre United
2006–07	Neath Athletic
2007–08	Goytre United
2008–09	Aberdare Town
2009–10	Goytre United
2010–11	Bryntirion Athletic
2011–12	Cambrian & Clydach
2012–13	West End
2013–14	Monmouth Town
2014–15	Caerau (Ely)
2015–16	Cardiff Met
2016-17	Barry Town United
2017-18	Llanelli Town
2018-19	Pen-y-Bont

=== Performance by club ===
Club	Wins	Winning years
Ton Pentre	7	1992–93, 1997–98, 1998–99, 1999–00, 2000–01, 2001–02, 2004–05
Goytre United	3	2005–06, 2007–08, 2009–10
Llanelli Town	2	2003–04, 2017–18
Barry Town	2	1993–94, 2016–17
Briton Ferry Athletic	1	1994–95
Carmarthen Town	1	1995–96
Haverfordwest County	1	1996–97
Bettws	1	2002–03
Neath Athletic	1	2006–07
Aberdare Town	1	2008–09
Bryntirion Athletic	1	2010–11
Cambrian & Clydach	1	2011–12
West End	1	2012–13
Monmouth Town	1	2013–14
Caerau (Ely)	1	2014–15
Pen-y-Bont	1	2018–19

== Welsh Football League Division One (2019–2020) ==
In 2019 it became level three of the Welsh Football Pyramid following the creation of the Cymru South.

Seasons	Winner
Welsh Football League Division 1
2019–20	Trefelin BGC

== See also ==
- Football in Wales
- Welsh football league system
- Welsh Cup
- Welsh League Cup
- FAW Premier Cup
- List of football clubs in Wales
- List of stadiums in Wales by capacity
