= Gap Queens Park F.C. =

Former association football club in Wales

Gap Queens Park
- Full name: Gap Queens Park Football Club
- Nickname: Park
- Founded: 1988 (as Queens Park F.C.)
- Dissolved: 2008
- Ground: Queensway Stadium, Wrexham
- League: Cymru Alliance
- 2007–08: Cymru Alliance, 6th (of 18)
Home colours	Away colours

Gap Queens Park Football Club was a Welsh association football club based in Wrexham. Their home ground was Queensway Stadium. Formed as Queens Park F.C. in 1988, the club nearly went out of business in 2007 after finishing bottom of the Cymru Alliance. They were subsequently taken over by new owners including recruitment firm Gap Personnel and rebranded as Gap Queens Park, playing in the company colours of all white with navy and maroon trim. After one season under their new identity, the club folded in 2008.
