= Pontypridd United F.C. =

Association football club in Wales

Coordinates: 51°34′10.6″N 3°16′53.9″W

Pontypridd United
- Full name: Pontypridd United Football Club
- Nickname: The Dragons
- Founded: 1992; 34 years ago as Pontypridd Town AFC
- Ground: USW Sports Park, Pontypridd
- Capacity: 1,000
- Chairman: Paul Ragan
- Manager: Vacant
- League: Cymru South
- 2025–26: Cymru South,11th of 16
- Website: https://pontytownafc.wixsite.com/pontytownafc
Home colours	Away colours

Pontypridd United FC (formerly Pontypridd Town AFC) is a Welsh football club, based in Pontypridd, Rhondda Cynon Taf. The club plays at USW Sports Park on Treforest Industrial Estate. The club plays in the Cymru South.

== History ==
=== 1990s ===
The club was formed in 1992 after Pontypridd Sports & Social Club merged with another team, Ynysybwl. They played at Ynysangharad Park in Pontypridd. It was decided in their second season at the Park that they should be called Pontypridd Town AFC.

=== 2000s ===
In April 2006, former Cardiff City player Ryan Nicholls earned success at the first attempt as the club beat Cardiff Corries 4–1 to secure promotion for the 2006–07 season to the Welsh Football League First Division. Nicholls also took the club to round four of the Welsh Cup. Earlier in the competition, they had knocked out the Division Two and Division One champions, Pontardawe Town & Ton Pentre, as well as the biggest giant-killing of the season – a 1–0 home win over Welsh Premier League side Aberystwyth Town.

The team manager for the 2007–08 season was Mal Camilleri but after the club's successive relegations down to Division Three, the club was on the brink of collapse. Discussions between Pontypridd Town and Treforest began. At the 11th hour, the club received support from local businessman Clayton Jones and was saved. In 2009 Cardiff businessman Phil Gibb joined the club and Allan Davies was appointed as Manager. Davies was an experienced defender who also coached at Graig FC in 2008 and previously spent ten years at Burton Albion where he played under Nigel Clough.

=== 2010s ===
In the 2010–11 season, the team started erratically, but from January they lost just two out of 20 games and they were on top of the table for more than two months. In the last week of the season, although they won the last game, they missed out on promotion to Division 2 on goal difference.

The 2013–14 season started with a change of management. Dominic Broad was appointed Manager, bringing in his brother Damien Broad as his Assistant Manager and Sam Houldsworth as First-team coach. A week before the season started the club only had only 2 signed players, the others having followed Allan Davies out of the club. They quickly set about signing enough players to field a team for the first match and set themselves the target of maintaining Welsh League status, which they achieved by finishing 15th that year.

On 29 July 2014, Ponty played a pre-season friendly against Valencia CF Mestalla, the second team of Spanish La Liga giants Valencia CF. In the run-up to the game, TalkSPORT radio presenter Colin Murray picked up on news of the match as it gathered national media attention and decided to come and watch the game, inviting any of his listeners to join him. Well over 100 people from around the UK booked their flights to Valencia and spent 3 days supporting the club. Against this professional team, the club came away with a 3–0 defeat.

In the summer of 2015, Assistant Manager Damien Broad took over the Manager's position from his brother Dominic due to work commitments; Dominic remained as Player/Assistant Manager. On 29 July 2015, exactly a year after the Valencia game, the club repeated it's feat by securing another high-profile friendly in Spain, this time against Deportivo de La Coruña.

In January 2016 Manager Damien Broad left the club having secured a prestigious coaching role with Manchester City based in China. Dominic Broad returned as Manager and lead the club to the Division Three title, breaking the club record for most wins in a season (25) with goalkeeper Ryan Griffiths breaking the club record for most Clean Sheets (14).

The talkSPORT Trophy: On 11 May 2016, almost 1,600 supporters from around the UK gathered in Ynysangharad Park to see Ponty Town take on the talkSPORT All-Stars. The brainchild of Dominic Broad and talksSPORT Radio presenter Colin Murray, the match saw a team of ex. professional footballers, other sportsmen and celebrities descended on Pontypridd in the inaugural talkSPORT Trophy. The All Stars fielded names including Danny Murphy, Dietmar Hamann, Danny Gabbidon, Simon Davies, Matthew Etherington, Micky Gray, Perry Groves, Martyn Williams, Mike Tindall, Sonny Pike, Max Rushden and Colin Murray. The club won the game 3–1 with goals from Luke Gullick, Scott Hillman and Omar Abdillahi, with a consolation penalty coming in the last minute for the All-Stars' Micky Gray.

After a successful 2015–16 season, the club sealed the Welsh Football League Division Three title in May 2016 after a 2–0 victory away at Tredegar Town. After their title-winning season, the club made several changes in the management team in their fierst season back in the Welsh Football League Division Two. Damien Broad returned in a Head Coach role at the club and alongside spending his days working at Bristol City's prestigious youth academy, whilst Welsh League veteran Phil Clay came in to replace Sam Houldsworth as Assistant Manager.

The Football Association of Wales were introducing the new Tier 2 Ground regulations for the 2018–19 season and Pontypridd Town's Ynysangharad Park did not comply with the new standards. After exploring a number of ground options with various parties including the local authority and Pontypridd RFC, the club approached the University of South Wales (USW) about the use of their Sports Campus on Treforest Industrial Estate and proceeded to use these facilities from the start of the 2017–18 campaign.

The club under Dom and Damien Broad had a tremendous season and obtained promotion to Welsh Football League Division One as runners up as well as getting to the fourth round of the Welsh Cup (eliminated by Penydarren BGC, then of the South Wales Alliance League). Unfortunately the new University of South Wales Tier 2 level facility was held up which meant the club either had to turn down promotion or find a ground share at a Tier 2 ground. After being turned down by Merthyr Town, Cambrian & Clydach and Ystrad Mynach Sports Centre, the club were helped by the Cardiff Athletic Stadium to start their season in the First Division after an FAW appeal. Due to excessive wear of the new surface at the Stadium the club had to find another ground after playing half the season there. Aberdare Town gave the club permission to play at their Aberaman Park tier 2 ground for the remainder of the season.

The club appointed Lee Kendall as their new Manager with eleven games to go to the end of the season to replace the Broad brothers who left for personal reasons. Kendall is a fully qualified 'A' licence coach both for outfield players as well as goalkeepers. Kendall left The Dragons at the end of the 2018–19 season. His assistant, Jonathan Jones, was appointed as his successor for the inaugural Cymru South campaign.

=== 2020s ===
The club started the 2020s with matches until COVID-19 hit and multiple games were cancelled. They then wouldn't play a match until July 16 of 2021, where they would play Briton Ferry in a Welsh League Cup match in which Pontypridd would win on penalties 4 to 3.

The club finished as runners-up in the 2021–22 Cymru South season and were promoted to the Cymru Premier after champions Llantwit Major were not awarded Tier 1 status by the Football Association of Wales. Jones resigned as manager at the end of the season.

Going into the new season, the club was renamed from Pontypridd Town to Pontypridd United in June 2022. Stated by club president Max James, this name change was because the club had moved from the town centre to Treforest and believed that the United name was the more appropriate name, although the club was still in the Pontypridd District. In their first season in the Cymru Premier the club would come out of the gates struggling. Because of this, the club sat in 11th at the end of the regular season. Only above 12th placed Broughton who had -2 points due to being deducted 3 points during the regular season. However, in the play-offs the dragons would perform much better. Pontypridd United would finish 8th in the Cymru Premier after having just 1 loss in 10 matches during the play-offs. Goalkeeper George Ratcliffe stepped up during the play-offs as the clubs goal difference went from -20 to -11. On the goals forced side of things the club did pretty well for a newly promoted side, scoring 41 goals in 32 matches. About 32% of those goals came from Benjamin Ahmun who scored 13 goals across the season. Because of these 13 goals he was tied for 5th in the top goal scored in the Cymru Premier. Overall, the club had a decently successful season in the Cymru Premier. The club hopes for prosperity in the 2023-24 Cymru Premier season.

=== Esports ===
In November 2024, Pontypridd United became the first football club in the Welsh pyramid to form an official esports partnership, linking up with the Pit Ponies esports organisation. The collaboration aimed to engage younger audiences and expand the club’s presence into competitive gaming. The club is recognised as a full member of Esports Wales.

In the 2025 Welsh Esports League Counter-Strike 2 season, the Pit Ponies (affiliated with Pontypridd United) reached the final, where they were defeated by S.E.A. Dragons. The club also participated in the first Welsh Masters “phygital” event, which combined traditional football activities with digital competition in EA Sports FC 25.

== Current squad ==
As of 2 July 2025

Note: Flags indicate national team as defined under FIFA eligibility rules; some limited exceptions apply. Players may hold more than one non-FIFA nationality.

No.	Pos.	Nation	Player
1	GK	WAL	Ashley Morris
2	DF	WAL	Luke Cummings
3	DF	WAL	Ethan Vaughan
4	DF	WAL	Keston Davies
5	DF	WAL	Ben Margetson
6	DF	WAL	Jordan Knott
10	MF	WAL	Kieran Lewis

No.	Pos.	Nation	Player
12	FW	GER	Jan Märtins
13	GK	WAL	Kane Draper
16	DF	WAL	Jarrad Wright
21	MF	ENG	David Carty
22	DF	WAL	Owen Pritchard
27	MF	WAL	Ryan Bevan
29	MF	WAL	Clayton Green (captain)
31	GK	WAL	George Ratcliffe

=== Technical staff ===
Position	Name
Manager	(Wales) Matthew Driscoll
Assistant manager	Vacant
Coach	(Wales)
Goalkeeping Coach	Vacant
Head of academy & Community	(Wales) Ben Slade
Club President	(Wales) Max James

=== Notable former players ===
For all players with a Wikipedia article see Category:Pontypridd United F.C. players.

== Honours ==
Welsh Football League

- Division 3 Winners: 2015–16
- Promotion to Cymru Premier: 2021–22

== Final league positions ==
Season	Division	Pl	W	D	L	F	A	Pts	Pos	Notes
2026-27	Cymru South	8	5	1	2	19	15	16		
2025-26	Cymru South	30	9	7	14	46	51	34	11th	
2024-25	Cymru South	30	16	5	9	54	44	53	5th	
2023-24	Cymru Premier	32	8	7	17	23	41	* 22	12th	Relegated to Cymru South – (9 Points Deducted)
2022-23	Cymru Premier	32	12	5	15	41	52	41	8th	
2021-22	Cymru South	30	21	6	3	79	30	69	2nd	Promoted to Cymru Premier
2020-21	Cymru South									Season cancelled due to COVID-19
2019-20	Cymru South	25	9	8	8	52	41	35	9th	Season cut short by COVID-19
2018-19	Welsh League Division 1	30	9	6	15	52	66	33	11th	
2017-18	Welsh League Division 2	30	22	1	7	93	31	67	2nd	Promoted after coming 2nd behind Llantwit Major
2016–17	D2	30	16	9	5	66	38	57	3rd	
2015–16	D3	34	25	6	3	99	31	81	1st	Promoted to Division 2
2014–15	D3	34	16	6	12	71	50	54	7th	
2013–14	D3	36	10	8	18	46	81	38	15th	
2012–13	D3	30	17	8	5	54	30	59	4th	Missed promotion on GD
2011–12	D3	28	16	4	8	69	38	52	5th	
2010–11	D3	34	19	6	9	73	50	63	5th	
2009–10	D3	34	18	9	7	67	41	63	5th	
2008–09	D2	34	5	6	23	39	100	21	18th	Relegated
2007–08	D1	34	3	4	27	38	116	13	17th	Relegated
2006–07	D1	36	24	8	4	88	37	80	3rd	
2005-06	D2	34	26	6	2	91	28	84	1st	Champions promoted Division 1
2004–05	D2	34	20	6	8	79	44	66	5th	
2003–04	D2	32	8	5	19	39	58	29	15th	
2002–03	D2	34	12	15	7	62	41	51	7th	
2001–02	D3	34	20	9	5	77	32	69	3rd	Promoted
2000–01	D3	30	10	10	10	40	47	40	10th	
1999-00	D3	28	6	10	12	54	62	28	12th	
1998–99	D2	30	4	1	25	43	111	13	16th	Relegated
1997–98	D2	30	10	2	18	41	85	32	12th	
1996–97	D2	30	9	4	17	46	71	31	11th	
1995–96	D1	34	12	7	15	58	73	* 36	15th	Relegated – (7 Points Deducted)
1994–95	D1	36	16	2	18	67	58	50	11th	
1993–94	D1	34	15	8	11	53	43	53	5th	
1992–93	D1	26	14	9	3	53	24	51	3rd	
1991–92	D1	32	15	4	13	57	53	49	6th	
1990–91	D1	32	11	4	17	55	60	37	11th	
