= Bridgend Town A.F.C. =

Former association football club in Wales

Bridgend Town
- Full name: Bridgend Town Association Football Club
- Nicknames: The Bridge, The Fish, The Townies
- Founded: 1920; 106 years ago
- Dissolved: 2013; 13 years ago
- Ground: Brewery Field, Newbridge Fields, Bridgend
- Capacity: 8,000 (1,100 seated)
- Chairman: Colin Mawer
- Coach: Tom Ramasut
- League: Welsh Football League Division One, Bridgend Port-Talbot Junior Football League
- 2012–13,: Welsh Football League Division One, 13th
Home colours	Away colours

Bridgend Town A.F.C. (Welsh: Clwb Pêl-droed Tref Pen-y-bont) was a Welsh football club that played in the Welsh Football League. Historically, their local rivals were Maesteg Park who disbanded in 2009. In 2013, they merged with local rivals Bryntirion Athletic to form Pen-y-Bont.

== History ==
Bridgend Town were originally formed in the early 1920s playing in the Welsh section of the Southern League. Despite finishing 6th, 14th and 4th, the side disbanded.

The club re-emerged in the 1960s playing in the Welsh League and were crowned Division 2 East champions in their first season. The club won the Welsh league in 1969 and did it again four years later. After their second title the name of the club changed to Everwarm FC due to the sponsorship from the local central heating company of the same name. They reverted to the name Bridgend Town on 6 December 1976. In the 1976/1977 season Bridgend reached the semi-finals of the Welsh Cup, losing to Cardiff City. The following season Bridgend rejoined the Southern League and were promoted to the Southern Premier Division. In 1979/1980, Bridgend were crowned overall champions of the Southern League, having won the Midland Division of the Southern League, beating Dorchester Town 5–1 in the Championship play-off.

Bridgend returned to the Welsh pyramid in 1983, where they finished runner-up in the National Division twice. After being relegated to the Welsh League First Division and subsequently the Second Division, the club were eventually promoted back to the First Division in 2002/2003, where they have remained since.

Bridgend Town vacated Coychurch Road in 2006 – their home for many years – to make way for associated works related to a new supermarket. They finished with a comprehensive 7–0 win over Croesyceiliog in their last fixture at the ground.

In the 2008–09 season, the club reached the semi-final of the Welsh Cup, losing 2–1 in a tight game to Bangor City who went on to retain the cup.

== Temporary grounds and return to Bridgend ==
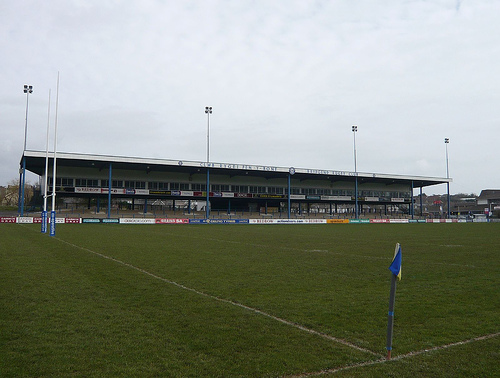
Brewery Field

Bridgend Town set up a temporary base at Tyn-y-Wern Fields, University of Glamorgan, Treforest, having also played at Porthcawl since vacating Coychurch Road.

The club returned to Bridgend for the 2009–10 season, playing at the home of Bridgend Rugby, the Brewery Field. Bridgend Town are one of 24 clubs that have applied for a domestic club licence to compete in a 12-team Welsh Premier League for the 2010–11 season.

The Brewery Field meets FAW Domestic Club Licensing requirements.

In December 2008, local company HD Limited announced plans for a "sporting village" at Island Farm, which includes a 15000-seater stadium, a 5000-capacity stadium for Bridgend Ravens and a 2000-capacity stadium for Bridgend Town.

In September 2009, an outline application was lodged with Bridgend County Borough Council.

== Merger ==
It was confirmed in 2013 that the club would merge with local rivals Bryntirion Athletic to form Pen-y-Bont given them access to £1,000,0000 of funding. The new club is based at Bryntirion Park and started life in Welsh Football League Division One from season 2013–14.

The club's last match was against Pontardawe Town which ended 0–0.

== Grassroots ==
Bridgend Town still exists today, although it is no longer a professional football club. Instead, the club now focuses on grassroots football, with teams ranging from Under-6 to Under-16. All Bridgend Town youth teams compete in the Bridgend Port Talbot Junior Football League, and they play their home matches at Newbridge Fields. One of their successful Age groups is Under-13.

== Club honours ==
=== League ===
- Southern Football League
  - Winners: 1979–80
- Welsh Football League Division One
  - Winners: 1968–69, 1972–1973
  - Runners-up: 1975–76 (as Everwarm); 1976–77, 1984–85, 1985–86
- Welsh Football League Division Two
  - Winners: 1996–97

=== Cups ===
- Welsh Cup
  - Semi finalists: 1976–77, 2008–09
- Welsh Football League Cup
  - Winners: 1987–88
  - Runners-up: 1998–99
