= Cambrian United F.C. =

Association football club in Wales

Coordinates: 51°37′24″N 3°28′5″W

Cambrian United
- Full name: Cambrian United Football Club
- Nicknames: Cam Army; Sky Blues
- Short name: Cam Utd; Cambrian
- Founded: 1965; 61 years ago
- Ground: The M&P 3G Stadium, Clydach Vale
- Capacity: 1000
- Chairman: Luke Davies
- Manager: Liam Williams
- League: Cymru Premier
- 2025–26: Cymru South, 2nd of 16 (promoted)
- Website: https://cambrianunited.cymru/
Home colours	Away colours

Cambrian United Football Club (formerly Cambrian and Clydach Vale B.G.C.) is a Welsh football club based in Clydach Vale in the Rhondda Valley. The club was founded in 1965 as Cambrian United and, after playing their football in the South Wales Amateur League for a number of years, they joined the Welsh Football League in 2005. A merger between Cambrian United and Clydach Vale Boys and Girls Club led to the current club. The men's side have risen through the divisions by finishing in promotion positions in Divisions Three and Two in successive seasons and are currently members of the Cymru Premier. The club also operates a senior women’s team competing within the South Wales Women’s & Girls’ League structure, reflecting its expanding commitment to the women’s game. In addition to its senior teams, Cambrian United runs a Football Association of Wales National Academi, providing an FAW‑licensed elite development pathway for youth players in the region.

== History ==
Cambrian & Clydach Vale was originally formed in 1965 as Cambrian United and was named after the local coal mine, Cambrian Colliery. In its formative years, the club played in the Rhondda & District League before joining the South Wales Corinthian League in 1972. In 1980, Cambrian United merged with Clydach Vale Boys and Girls Club but the merger proved disappointing as the club were nearly relegated out of the renamed South Wales Amateur League. The two clubs subsequently split.

In 1992, Cambrian United returned to the First Division of the South Wales Amateur League after winning the Second Division title. By the end of the decade, the club was regularly competitive at the top of the First Division, missing out on winning the league title during the 2000–01 season after being deducted six points. Cambrian United and Clydach Vale Boys and Girls Club merged for a second time in 2002 to become Cambrian & Clydach Vale Boys and Girls Club and the venture proved more successful. In its third year, the club won the First Division of the South Wales Amateur League and were promoted to the Welsh Football League.

In its first two seasons in the Welsh Football League, the club won consecutive promotions to reach the First Division by the 2007–08 season. The side has remained in the division for over a decade since. Former England manager Terry Venables, whose mother was from the Clydach Vale area, served as an honorary chairman of the club in the 2010s.

The club reached the final of the 2018–19 Welsh League Cup, beating several Welsh Premier League teams during the competition, including defending league and cup champions The New Saints. In the final, Cambrian lost 2–0 to Cardiff Metropolitan University at Jenner Park.

Ahead of the 2024–25 season, the club renamed back to Cambrian United.

In April 2026 Cambrian United confirmed promotion to the JD Cymru Premier by securing a top two finish in the Cymru South and completing the requirements of a UEFA and FAW Men’s Tier 1 licence, marking a historic milestone in the club’s journey.

This meant a side from the Rhondda Valley would be competing in the highest level of domestic football in Wales for the first time since Ton Pentre FC in the 1996-97 season.

== Squad ==
As of 02 November 2026

Note: Flags indicate national team as defined under FIFA eligibility rules; some limited exceptions apply. Players may hold more than one non-FIFA nationality.

No.	Pos.	Nation	Player
1	GK	WAL	Kelland Absalom
2	DF	WAL	Taylor Jones
3	DF	WAL	Danny Birch
4	MF	WAL	Ashley Evans
5	DF	WAL	Kyle Jones (Captain)
6	MF	WAL	Alex John
7	MF	WAL	Frazer Thomas
8	DF	WAL	Jay Woodford
9	FW	WAL	Alex Bonthron
10	FW	WAL	Liam Eason
11	MF	WAL	Dylan Edwards
12	DF	WAL	Camillo Strinati
13	GK	WAL	Mason Morgan

No.	Pos.	Nation	Player
14	DF	WAL	Jake Morris
15	DF	WAL	Josh Beecher
16	MF	WAL	Danny Hillman
18	MF	WAL	Kieran Lewis
20	MF	WAL	Jack Karadogan
21	MF	WAL	Brodie Gill
23	FW	WAL	Jac Joseph
24	MF	WAL	Logan Roberts
27	DF	WAL	Charlie Discoll
31	DF	WAL	Jarrard Wright
36	MF	WAL	Josh Allen
40	DF	WAL	Harrison Bright

== Women's Football ==
Cambrian United run an expanding women’s football programme established in 2023, after being approached by former international Sophie Dando, and local coach Jody Pugh. The senior women’s team compete in the South Wales Women’s & Girls’ League (Combined). The side finished second in the SWWGL Division One during the 2023–24 season and were subsequently promoted and selected as the wildcard entrants for the 2024–25 Genero Adran Trophy following the withdrawal of Pontardawe Town Ladies. At the start of the 2025-26 season former Wales Captain, Claire O'Sullivan, took over the Women's Team Manager role.

Alongside the competitive senior team, the club also operates the Cambrian United Hot Steppers, a women’s walking football squad that participates in the Wales Veterans Football Association’s Women’s O35 league structure. The programme was established to promote inclusive participation and provide opportunities for women returning to or newly entering the sport.

== Honours ==
=== League ===
- Cymru South
  - Runners-up: 2025–26
- Welsh Football League Division One
  - Champions: 2011–12
  - Runners-up: 2009–10; 2012–13; 2018–19
- Welsh Football League Division Two
  - Runners-up: 2006–07
- Welsh Football League Division Three
  - Champions: 2005–06
- South Wales Amateur League
  - Champions: 2004–05
  - Runners-up: 1999–00; 2001–02

=== Cup ===
- Welsh League Cup
  - Runners-up: 2018–19
