= Bryntirion Athletic F.C. =

Former association football club in Wales

Bryntirion Athletic
- Full name: Bryntirion Athletic Football Club
- Nickname(s): The Tirion
- Founded: 1956; 69 years ago
- Dissolved: 2013; 12 years ago
- Ground: Bryntirion Park, Bridgend
- Capacity: 1,200 (85 seated)
- Coordinates: 51°30′43.1″N 3°36′32.1″W
- Chairman: Emlyn Phillips
- Manager: Francis Ford
- League: Welsh Football League Division One
- 2012–13: Welsh Football League Division One, 8th
Home colours	Away colours

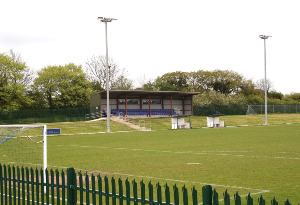
The Bryntirion Park ground

Bryntirion Athletic F.C. (Welsh: Clwb Pêl Droed Athletaidd Bryntirion) was a Welsh football team from the Bridgend suburb of Bryntirion. In 2013, they merged with local rivals Bridgend Town to form Pen-y-Bont.

== Merger ==
It was confirmed in 2013 that the club would merge with local rivals Bridgend Town to form Pen-y-Bont given them access to one million pounds of funding. The new club is based at Bryntirion Park and started life in Welsh Football League Division One from season 2013–14.

== Club honours ==
=== League ===
- Welsh Football League Division One
  - Winners: 2010–11
- Welsh Football League Division Three
  - Winners: 2003–04
- South Wales Amateur League Division One
  - Winners: 2002–03

=== Cups ===
- Welsh Football League Cup
  - Runners-up: 2007–08, 2012–13
