= Afan Lido F.C. =

Association football club in Wales

Afan Lido
- Full name: Afan Lido Football Club
- Founded: 1967; 59 years ago
- Ground: Marston Stadium; Aberavon
- Capacity: 4,200 (701 seated)
- Chairman: Leigh Shrimpton
- League: Cymru South
- 2025–26: Cymru South, 12th of 16
Home colours	Away colours

Afan Lido Football Club (Welsh: Clwb Pêl-droed Lido Afan) is a football team based in Port Talbot, Wales, playing in the Cymru South.

== History ==
Afan Lido F.C. were founded in 1967 shortly after the opening of the Afan Lido Sports Centre in Aberavon. A football team was set up to give the centre's users a proper organisation. Ken Williams was the prime mover behind the club.

Lido gained admission to the Port Talbot and District League for the 1967–68 season. In 1971–72 the club was accepted into the Welsh Football League, and two years later was promoted into the First Division (afterwards the Second Division), and another two years later they were promoted again into the Premier Division (afterwards the First Division). After a barren spell they were relegated but were promoted in 1984–85; by this time the League had been reorganised and a higher National Division had been formed, to which Afan Lido were promoted in 1989–90 after finishing 3rd (they had actually won the Premier Division the two previous seasons, but not been promoted because of the ground criteria set by the League).

Afan Lido became founder members of the League of Wales in 1992, and won the League Cup in 1992–93 and 1993–94. The next year the porous defence was addressed, and the team finished in second place in the League, winning a UEFA Cup place, but they were defeated by RAF Yelgava of Latvia on the away-goals rule. This was a taste of things to come, and Afan Lido were relegated from the League of Wales before winning their place back after an absence of two years.

Lido's young team that emerged during the spell out of the League of Wales grew together and the club enjoyed several encouraging seasons after settling again in the top flight. Lido's policy of choosing players from within the club's huge junior structure (which has 25 teams for all age groups, from under 5s upwards) paid off, when they finished 5th place in 2001–02. If the club had scored a single point more, in fact, Lido would have taken the town into European football for a second time.

Leaner years followed that near miss, and in 2005 the club left the Welsh Premier in controversial circumstances, after being deducted points for fielding an ineligible player in a league game. The points deducted sunk the Lido into the relegation zone below NEWI Cefn Druids, which sealed their fate.

In 2011 Lido secured a return to the Welsh Premier and their first season in the top flight saw the club survive the drop. The club also won the Welsh Premier League Cup, defeating Newtown on penalties at Aberystwyth.

Off-field issues surfaced the following season, however, and Lido had to assemble an all-new squad under the guidance of Paul Reid. The club finished bottom of the Welsh Premier, but survived relegation due to the demise of Llanelli and the inability of Haverfordwest County to finish in a promotion spot in Welsh League Division One.

On 4 July 2013 Afan Lido appointed former club captain and fans favourite Paul Evans to the hotseat as they look to cement their position within the top division.

For the 2016–17 season, the club found themselves in the same division as town rivals Port Talbot.

Season	League	Position
92/93	League of Wales	12th
93/94	League of Wales	15th
94/95	League of Wales	2nd
95/96	League of Wales	20th (R)
96/97	Welsh Football League Division One	6th
97/98	Welsh Football League Division One	2nd (P)
98/99	League of Wales	14th
99/00	League of Wales	10th
00/01	League of Wales	11th
01/02	League of Wales	5th
02/03	Welsh Premier League	7th
03/04	Welsh Premier League	14th
04/05	Welsh Premier League	18th (R)
05/06	Welsh Football League Division One	7th
06/07	Welsh Football League Division One	5th
07/08	Welsh Football League Division One	6th
08/09	Welsh Football League Division One	7th
09/10	Welsh Football League Division One	3rd
10/11	Welsh Football League Division One	2nd (P)
11/12	Welsh Premier League	10th
12/13	Welsh Premier League	12th
13/14	Welsh Premier League	12th (R)
14/15	Welsh Football League Division One	13th
15/16	Welsh Football League Division One	8th
16/17	Welsh Football League Division One	8th
17/18	Welsh Football League Division One	5th
18/19	Welsh Football League Division One	4th
19/20	Welsh Football League Division One	10th
21/22	JD Cymru South	10th
22/23	JD Cymru South	6th
23/24	JD Cymru South	7th
24/25	JD Cymru South	11th

== Current squad ==
As of 15th January 2025.

Note: Flags indicate national team as defined under FIFA eligibility rules; some limited exceptions apply. Players may hold more than one non-FIFA nationality.

No.	Pos.	Nation	Player
—	GK	WAL	Exauce Dimoneke
—	DF	WAL	Jackson Hall
—	DF	WAL	Lee Surman
—	DF	WAL	Cole Gibbings
—	DF	WAL	Callum Jones
—	DF	ENG	William Francis-Obeng
—	DF	WAL	Jak Carson
—	DF	WAL	Cai Owens
—	MF	WAL	Cory Woods
—	MF	ENG	Johden De Mayer
—	MF	WAL	Cameron Keetch

No.	Pos.	Nation	Player
—	MF	WAL	Liam McCreesh
—	MF	WAL	Ioan Evans
—	MF	WAL	Sacha Walters
—	MF	WAL	Matthew Richards
—	MF	WAL	Brad Flay
—	MF	WAL	Dylan Williams
—	MF	WAL	Sean Hanbury
—	MF	ITA	Jonathan Invernizzi
—	FW	WAL	Liam Griffiths
—	FW	WAL	Joshua Webber
—	FW	WAL	Brandon Roberts

== Staff ==
- Director of Football: Mark Robinson
- Manager: Lee Surman
- Assistant Manager: Lee John
- Coach: Liam Hughes
- Goalkeeping coach: Gareth Couch
- Physio: Leighton Jones

== Stadium ==
They play at the Lido Ground, currently known as the Marston's Stadium for sponsorship purposes. It's located in Aberavon, Neath Port Talbot and has a capacity of 4,200 (601 seated).

== Rivalries ==
Afan Lido's main rivals are Port Talbot Town, who are based less than half a mile away from Afan Lido's ground. However over recent years with Port Talbot Town dropping out of the league, a strong rivalry has formed with 3 other Port Talbot based teams playing in the JD Cymru South. Baglan Dragons, Trefelin and Goytre United have all filled the rivalry gap left by Port Talbot Town in recent years.

== Honours ==
- Welsh League Cup winners (3): 1992/93, 1993/94, 2011/12
- Welsh Football League Cup winners (2): 2006/07, 2008/09
- U16’s Neath Port Talbot league Cup Winners: 2018/19

== Biggest victories and losses ==
- Biggest win: 9–1 v. Dinas Powys in 2010.
- Biggest defeat: 1–8 v. Connah's Quay Nomads in 2014.
- Biggest League of Wales win: 6–0 v. Abergavenny Thursdays in 1993.
- Biggest League of Wales defeat: 0–6 v. Barry Town in 1995.

== Managers ==
- Phil Robinson / David Rees (1992–93)
- Dai Rees (1993–94)
- Nigel Rees (1994–96)
- (Wales) Mark Robinson (1998–06)
- Phil Holmes / Paul Evans (2006–09)
- Craig Duggan (2009–10)
- Kim Bowley (2010–11)
- (Wales) Andrew Dyer (1 July 2011 – 30 June 2012)
- (England) Paul Reid (2012–13)
- (Wales) Paul Evans (1 July 2013–2014)
- (Wales) Stephen Llewellyn (2014–2015)
- (Wales) Mark Robinson (2015– 2016)
- (Wales) Liam McCreesh (2016–2017)
- (Wales) Wayne Davies (2017–2018)
- (Wales) Andrew Mumford (2018–2019)
- (Wales) Paul Evans (2019–2024)
