= A.F.C. Porth =

Association former football club in Porth, Wales

Coordinates: 51°36′56.7″N 3°25′41.9″W

AFC Porth
- Full name: Athletic Football Club Porth
- Nickname: Black Dragons
- Founded: 1950 (as Beatus United F.C)
- Ground: Dinas Park, Porth
- Chairman: Huw Jones
- Manager: Stuart Dean
- 2022–23: South Wales Alliance Championship

AFC Porth was a Welsh football team based in the village of Porth in the Rhondda Valley. The club played in the South Wales Alliance League Championship Division, which is the fifth tier of Welsh football. The club played its home matches at Dinas Park before withdrawing in 2023.

The club was originally founded in 1950 as Beatus United before changing its name to Porth in 1986. Porth won the Second Division of the Welsh Football League in 1993 and spent several years in the First Division. The club changed its name to A.F.C. Rhondda in 1996 but reverted to Porth in 2004.

In 2023, the club was unable to field a side, and withdrew from competition for the 23/24 season.

== History ==
The town of Porth in the Rhondda Valley had been represented by several football teams, including Porth Athletic, Porth United and Porth Welfare prior to 1950. The same year, a new club was formed under the guise of Beatus United which represented a local factory. The club competed under the name for 34 years in the Rhondda League and later the South Wales Amateur League, before it was renamed as A.F.C. Porth in 1984. The side won the Second Division of the Welsh Football League in the 1991–92 season. When the Welsh football league system was restructured the ahead of the following campaign with the foundation of the League of Wales, Porth remained in the Second Division, although it had effectively been promoted due to the restructure. In the 1992–93 season Porth reached the quarter-final of the Welsh Cup.

The side finished as winners of the Second Division for the second consecutive season and won promotion to the First Division of the Welsh Football League. In 1996, the club was renamed as A.F.C. Rhondda in the hope of increasing the club's profile. The newly renamed club initially enjoyed improved results, finishing in the top three of the First Division twice between 1997 and 1999. However, having finished in the top eight for five consecutive season, the club was relegated after finishing bottom of the division during the 2001–02 season. A second straight relegation in the following season led the team to the Third Division. The club reverted to its previous name, A.F.C. Porth in 2004.

In 2007, Porth was relegated from the Welsh Football League to the South Wales Amateur League. However, the club won promotion back to the Welsh Football League in its first season, becoming the first team to achieve a direct return to the Welsh Football League. The club entered a swift rise, winning two promotions in the following three seasons to return to the First Division. Manager Scott Young, who led the club back to the First Division, left the club in 2012 to take up a position with Port Talbot Town. Porth was relegated back to the Second Division during the 2015–16 season.

== Ground ==
The club played its home matches at Dinas Park which features a single stand for spectators. In 2015, a new stand was constructed, to replace the original structure which had been built in the 1990s, along with other improvements, following a grant from the Welsh Football Trust and fundraising efforts. Porth Harlequins of the South Wales Premier League Division 1 west now play there.
