= Cwmbran Celtic F.C. =

Association football club in Wales

Coordinates: 51°38′37.4″N 3°1′5.2″W

Cwmbran Celtic
- Full name: Cwmbran Celtic Football Club
- Nickname: The Yellows
- Founded: 1925
- Ground: Celtic Park, Cwmbran
- Capacity: 700
- Chairman: Barrie Desmond
- Manager: Simon Berry
- League: Ardal SE League
- 2025–26: Cymru South, 16th of 16 (relegated)
- Website: http://www.cwmbranceltic.com
Home colours	Away colours

Cwmbran Celtic Football Club is a football club based in Cwmbran, Torfaen, South Wales who play in the Ardal SE League.

The first team plays in the Cymru South at Celtic Park in Cwmbran.

== History ==
Cwmbran Celtic formed in 1925 as CYMS (Catholic Young Men's Society). Initially the club played in the Newport & District League, winning the Division 2 Section A title in 1925–26. Between 1930 and 1939 the club played in the Gwent Church League. After the war Celtic were back in the Newport & District League, winning the Premier Division title in 1950–51. A few years later the seniors disbanded and only junior sides were run, however in the early 1960s the club was reformed under the new name of Cwmbran Catholics. In 1972 they were renamed as Cwmbran Celtic. In season 1972–73 Celtic won the Gwent Amateur Cup and were runners-up in the Gwent Premier League.

In 1979 the club bought its own premises at Oak Street, Old Cwmbran which is the club's present headquarters. The club's ground was in Cwmbran Park but over the seasons the drainage deteriorated and the club sought and was granted the use of the grounds outside Cwmbran Stadium which were shared with Cwmbran Cricket club. The cricket club later moved to Caerleon and Celtic were granted the lease.

Cwmbran Celtic played in the Gwent County League throughout the 1980s and 1990s and after gaining promotion as champions of Division 2 in 1986–87 they were comfortably placed in the First Division for the next dozen or so seasons. The side gained successive promotions from the 3rd to the 1st division between 1999 and 2001 and in season 1999–00 they won the Gwent County league cup.

In season 2004–05 under new player-manager Mickey Copeman, the club were runners-up to Clydach Wasps. As runners-up Cwmbran Celtic applied for the promotion place, and the Welsh League accepted the club's application.

In their first season, 2005–06, Celtic struggled near the bottom of the 3rd division all season.

The following season, 2006–07, Celtic, now back at their upgraded and newly named ground, Celtic Park, only lost 2 games all season and enjoyed a 24 match unbeaten run. When they went to Risca Town for their last match of the season they were already promoted.

In Division 2 Celtic consolidated their position in seasons 2007–08 and 2008–09. In season 2009–10 they were runners-up to Penrhiwceiber.

In their first season in the 1st division, 2010–11, under new manager Ben Graham, Celtic struggled during the first half of the season and were firmly planted in the relegation zone but a superb run-in during which they won 7 and drew 3 of 14 games placed them safely in 12th place out of 16.

In 2011–12 and 2012–13 they finished 12th.

In 2015–16 Nicky Church stepped up to take the manager's role and took Celtic to the Quarter final of the Welsh Cup – the club's best ever Welsh cup run. The team finished season 2016–17 in 6th place in Division 1, its best ever finish in five seasons in the top tier.

Over the next two seasons the team consolidated its place in Division 1 and in 2019–20 was placed in the newly formed FAW tier 2 Cymru South League.

In August 2026 the club received attention from the media after Grian Chatten the lead singer of Irish band Fontaines D.C. wore the clubs jersey at the Reading Festival.

== Honours ==
- Gwent Premier League County Motors Cup – Winners: 2000–01
