= West End F.C. =

Coordinates: 51.645151°N 3.851810°W

West End
- Full name: West End Football Club
- Founded: 1964
- Ground: Pryderi Park Stadium, Mayhill
- League: West Wales Premier League
- 2024–25: West Wales Premier League, 12th of 16
Home colours	Away colours

West End Football Club is a football team, based in the Mayhill area of Swansea, Wales. They play in the West Wales Premier League.

== History ==
Formed in 1964 by a group of local enthusiasts in a local public house (The Wellington) which was situated in the west end of Swansea and so the birth of West End AFC.

In 2004–05, the club won the FAW Trophy, defeating Rhydymwyn F.C. at Rhayader.

== Notable players ==
Alan Beer played for West End before later joining Swansea City.

Jazz Richards played for West End before joining Cardiff City's academy

== Honours ==
- FAW Trophy – Winners: 2004–05, 2005–06
- Welsh Football League
  - Division 1 – Winners: 2012–13
  - Division 2 – Winners: 2008–09
  - Division 3 – Runner Up: 2005–06
- Swansea Senior Football League
  - First Division Champions (13): 1970–71, 1973–74, 1974–75, 1976–77, 1982–83, 1985–86 1994–95; 1996–97; 1997–98; 1998–99; 2001–02; 2002–03; 2004–05
- West Wales Amateur Cup/ Intermediate Cup.
  - Winners: 1968–69, 1974–75, 1977–78, 1982–83, 1993–94, 1997–98, 2001–02
  - Runners-up: 1965–66, 1979–80, 1996–97, 1998–99, 2002–03
- West Wales Senior Cup
  - Runners-up: 2008–09
