= Caerau (Ely) A.F.C. =

Association football club in Wales

Coordinates: 51°27′51″N 3°14′51″W

Caerau Ely
- Full name: Caerau Ely Association Football Club
- Nickname: Young Guns
- Founded: 1955
- Ground: Cwrt-yr-Ala
- Capacity: 500
- Chairman: Mark Rees
- Manager: Ben Stait
- League: Cymru South
- 2025–26: Cymru South, 4th of 16
- Website: http://www.pitchero.com/clubs/caerauelyfc/
Home colours	Away colours

Caerau Ely Association Football Club is a Welsh team based in Cardiff. It was formed in 1955. The club plays in the Cymru South.

Caerau Ely were formed in 1955 joining the junior division of the Cardiff Combination League. A set of red jerseys given to the club by Mr.Ron Miller of Cross Bros. AFC was to determine the colours of the club forever. The club started its playing days on the Ely Racecourse moving on to Glyn Derw School in the eighties and then finally moving onto the Cwrt-yr-Ala ground in Ely.

In 1991 they gained entry to the new Senior League and then progressed to the CC Sports Welsh League in 1998 after beating Dinas Powys 1–0 in the play-off held at Bridgend.

The history shows that after winning well over eighty combined league titles and cups in its time, Caerau Ely has become one of the most successful clubs in Cardiff.

Season 04/05 the club gained promotion from the 3rd Division to the 2nd finishing in the third place, they carried on surviving near the bottom and scraping to safety at the end of most seasons, with most players leaving their best days behind them, the club realised they had to look at the future.

Season 06/07 saw the coming together of Caerau Ely and the youth of Llanishen Dons football club. Caerau without a representative side in the youth league approached Llanishen to invite them to join the Caerau set up. The advantages for Llanishen were obvious in that they could play at a very good level and the advantages for Caerau were that they would have a new group of young players for the future.

The first season saw the youngsters finish third in the East division and also saw a number of players move up and take their place in the senior side, the next season they finished second with even more of a presence in the first side.

Season 09/10 was the biggest in the club's history ending in promotion to Division One, winning 8 drawing 2 and with 1 loss in the last 11 games they took third place. On times the club played with a starting eleven that did not have a player over the age of 21, so the youth policy adopted in 06/07 had finally paid off.

The first Season in Division One went very well, with the club finishing with a respectful fifth place, which was the club's highest finish in their history and a great achievement. The second season the club came up very short, with major problems trying to keep hold of players and discipline on and off the pitch returning to days the club thought they had moved on from. They finished bottom of the league.

Caerau Ely returned to Division Two in 2012–13 after relegation from the first division. A new team Manager, Nana Baah, was helped by Giles Smith and Dominic Broad to try to rebuild the team. They returned to Division One the following season and in 2014–15 won the Welsh League Division One title and were runners up in the league cup losing to Taff's Well A.F.C. at Jenner Park.

== Current squad ==
Note: Flags indicate national team as defined under FIFA eligibility rules; some limited exceptions apply. Players may hold more than one non-FIFA nationality.

No.	Pos.	Nation	PlayerJaden Bahumaid
—	GK	WAL	Elliott Matthews
—	DF	WAL	Jerome Maynard
—	DF	WAL	Levi Robson
—	DF	WAL	George Shepherd
—	MF	WAL	Huw Corne
—	DF	WAL	Danny Hooper
—	MF	WAL	Joe Shephard
—	MF	WAL	Nathan Mathias
—	MF	ITA	Matteo Pulvirenti

No.	Pos.	Nation	Player
—	MF	WAL	Adam Coomer
—	MF	WAL	Dylan Amin
—	FW	WAL	Rameer Outlaw
—	FW	WAL	Dan Griffiths
—	FW	WAL	David Lyons
—	FW	WAL	Liam Bishop
—	FW	WAL	Dylan Batten
—	FW	WAL	Callum Smith
—	DF	WAL	Joe Woodiwiss

== Honours ==
- Ardal SW – Champions: 2022–23
- Welsh League Division One – Champions: 2014–15
- Cardiff Combination League - Champions (10): 1962–63; 1972–73; 1974–75; 1976–77; 1982–83; 1983–84; 1985–86; 1986–87; 1988–89; 1989–90
