= Taffs Well A.F.C. =

Association football club in Wales

Coordinates: 51°32′49.4″N 3°15′55.8″W

Taffs Well FC
- Full name: Taffs Well Association Football Club
- Nickname: The Wellmen
- Founded: 1946
- Ground: Rhiw'r Ddar Stadium (3,000)
- Chairman: Geza Hajgato
- Manager: Mark Dunford
- League: Ardal SW League
- 2025–26: Ardal SW League, 14th of 16
- Website: http://www.taffswellfc.com
Home colours	Away colours

Taffs Well Association Football Club is a Welsh association football Club founded in 1946. The team are based in Taff's Well, near Cardiff, and compete in the Ardal SW League. The team is nicknamed the Wellmen and their home is situated at the Rhiw'r Ddar Stadium in Taffs Well.

== History ==
Following the end of World War II, Elan Gough and Bill Newman initiated the idea of merging local clubs to improve the facilities and playing standards than experienced pre-war. This idea was warmly welcomed and Taffs Well AFC was born. The club was formed at St Marys Church Hall, Glan-y-Llyn in the summer of 1946. Two teams were formed and entered into the Cardiff and District League. The club's first ground was at the Gwaelod-y-Garth cricket club. The team then shortly moved to a field provided by Dai Parry, a local farmer. Following the inaugural season the club joined the South Wales Amateur League. The club were champions twice and runners up 4 times between 1949 and 1956 and won the Corinthian Cup in 1954.Following a successful initial period, Bill Newman died and the Club faced a difficult time. In 1960, Don James joined the club as Secretary. The determination of Don and many others resulted in a change of fortunes for the team both on and off the pitch, with the club winning three titles in the 1970s. Don has now been with the club for over 60 years and his fantastic efforts were rewarded in 2014 as the main stand was renamed the “Don James Stand”.

The Club won the South Wales Amateur League First Division in 1975, 1976 and 1977 as well as South Wales Intermediate Cup in 1975 and 1977. The Club entered the Welsh League in 1977. Malcolm Frazer joined the club the same year and his hard work was recognised in 2017 with the unveiling of a new stand brandishing his name. In 1996 committee member Norma Samuel became the club's secretary until her deathin 2024.

Under the management of Lee Bridgeman, the club's most successful spell in the 21st century as of 2025 saw the Club finish as Division One runners-up in 2011-12 and 2012–13, and winning the Nathaniel Car Sales League Cup four times in five seasons; 2011–12, 2012–13, 2014-2015 and 2015–16. In 2018-19 Taffs Well Youth side won the Welsh League Youth Division. and in 2021/22 won the JD Cymru Premier Development League South and the Cymru Premier League National Playoff.

The club was a member of the inaugural JD Cymru South League, which began in 2019, finishing 7th in the 2021/22 season.

In 2023 the first Taffs Well Women's team was established.

== Honours ==
- Welsh Football League Division One
  - Runners-up: 2011–12, 2012–13; 2014–15; 2015–16
- Welsh Football League Cup
  - Winners: 2011–12, 2012–13, 2014–15, 2015–16,
- South Wales Amateur League
  - Champions: 1952–53; 1953–54; 1954–55; 1974–75; 1975–76; 1976–77
- South Wales Amateur League
  - Runners-up: 1955–56; 1971–72; 1972–73; 1973–74
- South Wales FA Senior Cup
  - Winners: 2015–16; 2016–17
- South Wales FA Intermediate Cup
  - Winners: 1957–58; 1974–75; 1976–77
- Corinthian Cup
  - Winners: 1953–54
- Corinthian Cup
  - Runners-up: 1950–51; 1952–53

== Colours ==
The predominant club colours are yellow and black. The strip typically has a yellow top, with the shorts normally black. The colours of blue, green and pink have been mainly used in the away strips.

== Stadium ==
Taffs Well play their home games at the Rhiw'r Ddar Stadium in Taff's Well. It is currently known as the Gentles Construction Stadium due to a sponsorship deal. The 3000 capacity stadium was expanded to include two new stands between 2014 and 2017.
