= Goytre United F.C. =

Association football club in Wales

Goytre United
- Full name: Goytre United Football Club
- Nickname: The Goyt
- Founded: 1963
- Ground: Glenhafod Park Stadium, Goytre
- Capacity: 1,000 (350 seated)
- Chairman: Craig Humphries & Andrew Watts
- Manager: Nathan Cadette
- League: Ardal SW League
- 2025–26: Ardal SW League, 7th of 16
- Website: https://goytreunited.co.uk/
Home colours	Away colours

Goytre United Football Club is a Welsh football club based in Goytre, near Port Talbot. They play in the Ardal SW League. Despite winning Division One of the Welsh Football League in 2005–06 and 2007–08 they were not promoted to the Welsh Premier League.

Their home stadium is the Glenhafod Park Stadium.

== History ==
In the spring of 1963 what funds the club had were handed to football secretary Boris Suhanski. Utilising these funds Goytre United Football Club was reborn. The club were members of the Port Talbot and District Football League but were promoted to the South Wales Amateur League in the late sixties. After a successful opening spell things became more difficult and the club was eventually relegated back into the Port Talbot League in the late seventies.

In 1982 the Goytre United AFC Social Club opened.

A period of ten years passed when the club competed in the Port Talbot and District League. During this time the club grew in stature on and off the field and in 1988 was re-elected back into the South Wales Amateur League. In the 1989–90 season the club secured promotion to the First Division of the South Wales Amateur League. Also in this year a 350 all-seating grandstand was built.

In the 1990–91 season the club were promoted to the Welsh Football League and on 24 August 1991 played their first match against Milford United. Since the club's elevation into the Welsh League, steady improvements have been made both on and off the pitch and in 2000 floodlights were erected. In the 2003–2004 season the club attained its highest position within the League when it ended the season in the runners-up spot in division one and just missed out on promotion to the Welsh Premier League.

In the 2004–05 season the club won the League Challenge Cup for the first time at Ton Pentre. Further history was made in the 2005–06 season when the club lifted the Welsh League First Division Championship, only losing three games. However, they chose to remain in the Welsh League First Division for the 2006–07 season. Normally, the top clubs from each of the two feeder leagues (the Welsh League First Division and the Cymru Alliance) are promoted subject to an application for membership of the Welsh Premier League being received and accepted and the stadium and infrastructure safety criteria of the League being met. Goytre United elected not to apply for promotion, and the First Division runners-up, Neath Athletic, failed to meet the stadium criteria and had their bid for promotion rejected.

In the 2006–07 season, the reserve team won the Welsh League Reserve West Division for the first time in the club's history, guided by former team player/manager Paul Wiseman.

In 2007–08 they won the Welsh Football League again, but once more they declined to apply for promotion to the Welsh Premier League.

In 2008-09 the same situation occurred with Goytre winning the Welsh Football League for a third time, but were still denied promotion.

In the 2022/23 Season in the Cymru South Goytre started off the season with Mark Pike as the manager. Goytre got off to a poor start with the first game of the season which was in the Nathanial MG Cup taking a defeat to Trefelin which ended 6–1 with Youngster Alex Walters scoring the only goal. Things were looking promising after taking 4 points out of their first 2 games against Swansea University and Cambrian and Clydach Vale. The season took a turn for the worse after picking up 4 points out of a possible 30 in the next 10 games which had them sitting in the relegation zone with the possibility of relegation for the first time in 20+ years. At the start of December the clubs chairman Lyndon made the decision of parting ways with the current coaching team to bring in the previous seasons winning manager Karl Lewis and his team of coaches. Karl got off to a great start by defeating his old club Llantwit Major 4-3 who were sitting in the top half of the table. From the 18 remaining games Karl had to rescue Goytre from the relegation zone. He managed to take 24 points and secured Goytres’ place in the Cymru South for the 2023/24 season.

On 19 October 2025 the club announced the decision to part ways with manager Michael Waters.

== Honours ==
Welsh Football League

- Champions: 2005–06, 2007–08, 2009–10

Port Talbot League Challenge Cup

- Finalists: 1985–86, 1988–89

Port Talbot League Premier Division

- Runners-up: 1988–89

South Wales Amateur League Division 2

- Runners-up: 1989–90

Port Talbot Challenge Cup

- Winners: 1992–93

Welsh League Division Three

- Runners-up: 1993–94

Welsh League Reserve Division

- Runners-up: 1994–95

Welsh League Division Two

- Runners-up: 1995–96

Welsh League Reserve Division Cup

- Finalists: 1996–97

Welsh League Division One

- Runner-up: 2003–04

Welsh League Shamrock Travel Cup

- Winners: 2004–05

Port Talbot District Reserve Division

- Winners: 2011–12, 2012-13

Port Talbot District Reserve Premier Division

- Winners: 2014–15

Port Talbot & District Reserve Knockout Cup

- Winners: 2011–12, 2012-13

FAW Reserve League South West

- Winners: 2022–23

== Club Directory ==
•PATRON•

Martyn Margetson

•CLUB BOARD•

•CHIEF EXECUTIVE OFFICER•

Craig Humphries

•CHAIRMAN•

Andrew Watts

•GENERAL SECRETARY/HEAD OF LICENSING•

Ryan Harding & Morgan Lambert

•GENERAL MANAGER•

Richard C Final

•TREASURER•

Pam Watts

•MEDIA OFFICERS•

Matthew Rogers & Keane Watts

•WEBSITE EDITOR•

Morgan Lambert

•MATCH DAY OFFICIALS•

Malcolm Margetson, David Glaves, Ben Howells, Morgan Lambert, Ryan Harding, Cameron Suhanski, Byron Hillier, David Ace

•SOCIAL CLUB ASSISTANTS•

Sue Ace & Julie Humphreys

•CORNER FLAG MATCH REFRESHMENTS•

Pam Watts & Chloe Davies

•CLUB LIFE MEMBERS•

John H Tobin, David G Evans, Robert A Ketcher

•FIRST TEAM HEAD COACH•

Nathan Cadette

•FIRST TEAM COACHES•

Owen Roberts & Cory Kingdom

•DEVELOPMENT & RESERVE TEAM COACH•

Mark Simmonds

•UNDER 19 TEAM COACHES•

Mark Simmonds

•HEAD OF MINI/JUNIOR FOUNDATION PHASE•

Paul Cardy

•CLUB PHYSIO•

Jordan Discombe

== First Team Squad ==
As of July 24 Note: Flags indicate national team as defined under FIFA eligibility rules; some limited exceptions apply. Players may hold more than one non-FIFA nationality.

No.	Pos.	Nation	Player
—	GK	WAL	Lucas Cavalcante
—	DF	WAL	Dafydd Owen
—	DF	WAL	Rhys Thomas
—	DF	WAL	Daniel Paull
—	DF	WAL	Connor Smith
—	DF	WAL	Kyran Gardner
—	DF	WAL	Iwan Batcup
—	DF	WAL	Jack O’Brien
—	MF	WAL	Daniel Simmonds
—	MF	WAL	Isaac Davies
—	MF	WAL	Kyle Williams

No.	Pos.	Nation	Player
—	FW	WAL	Samuel McMahon
—	MF	WAL	Kyran Steadman
—	MF	WAL	Jonathan Fletcher
—	MF	WAL	Danny Hillman
—	MF	WAL	Bradley Flay
—	MF	WAL	Cameron Harris
—	MF	WAL	William Flay
—	FW	WAL	Jordan Edwards
—	FW	WAL	Keane Watts
—	FW	WAL	Benjamin Cripps
—	FW	WAL	Leon Rayner

== First Team Staff ==
- Manager: (Wales) Nathan Cadette
- Assistant Manager: (Wales) Owen Roberts
- Coaches: (Wales) Cory Kingdom
- Physio: (Wales) Jordan Discombe
- Social Media Officers: (Wales) Keane Watts and Matthew Rogers
- Chief Operating Officer: (Wales) Craig Humphrey's (CxJ building services)
