= Aberdare Town F.C. =

Association football club in Wales

Aberdare Town
- Full name: Aberdare Town Football Club
- Founded: 1892
- Ground: Aberaman Park
- Capacity: 268 (seated)
- Manager: Jordan Price
- League: Aberdare Valley League
- 2025–26: South Wales Premier League Division One East, 10th of 12 (relegated)
- Website: http://www.aberdaretownfc.co.uk
Home colours	Away colours

Aberdare Town Football Club is a Welsh football club that play in the Aberdare Valley League. Their ground is situated on Cardiff Road, Aberdare, between the suburb of Aberaman and the village of Abercwmboi. They are a former member of the Welsh Football League.

== History ==
Aberaman were founded in 1892 as Aberaman Athletic and joined the Southern League in 1919. In 1926 they merged with nearby Aberdare Athletic, then of the Football League Third Division South to form Aberdare & Aberaman Athletic. However the merged club dropped out of the Football League in 1927 and the arrangement came to an end the following year; Aberaman broke off and started competing as a single club again, while Aberdare promptly folded.

Aberaman continued to compete as a single club until 1945, when another combined Aberdare & Aberaman Athletic FC were re-formed. Once again, the merged clubs only lasted two years, and Aberaman went their separate way in 1947, and have continued in that form to this day.

From 2004 to 2009, the club was known as ENTO Aberaman Athletic due to a sponsorship agreement. The agreement ran out after the 2008–09 season, and the club reverted to its original name. For the 2012–13 season the club adopted the name Aberdare Town F.C.

At the end of the 2019–20 season the club were relegated to the South Wales Alliance League Premier Division.

== Nickname ==
The club's nickname before the merger with Aberdare was the Swifts.
