= Ton Pentre F.C. =

Association football club in Ton Pentre, Wales

Coordinates: 51°38′47″N 3°29′7″W

- Full name: Ton Pentre Football Club
- Nickname: Rhondda Bulldogs
- Founded: 1896 & 1935
- Ground: Ynys Park, Ton Pentre
- Capacity: 250
- Manager: Ryan Betteney
- League: South Wales Premier League Championship Division
- 2025–26: South Wales Premier League Championship Division, 8th of 12
- Website: www.tonpentreafc.com
Home colours	Away colours

Ton Pentre Football Club (Welsh: Clwb Pêl-droed Ton Pentre) is a football team based in Ton Pentre, Wales, which plays in the South Wales Premier League Championship Division.

Nicknamed the "Rhondda Bulldogs", the team plays at Ynys Park, Ton Pentre, Rhondda Cynon Taff. Home strip is all red, away strip is all blue with white detail.

== History ==
The present club was founded in 1935, but there were at least two earlier Ton Pentre F.C.'s, dating back to at least 1896, when Ton Pentre was a football-playing island in the rugby union sea of the South Wales valleys. One of the previous incarnations of Ton Pentre F.C. reached the Welsh Cup final in 1922 for the town's first and only time where they lost 2–0 to Cardiff City in Tonypandy.

After the Second World War, the Welsh National League (South) was re-introduced and besides having Division One a new Division Two was regionalised into East and West sections, with the two respective champions being promoted to replace the bottom two clubs of Division One. Ton Pentre were placed in the Division Two (West) competition and became the first champions.

On 15 November 1986 Ton Pentre played Cardiff City at Ynys Park in the First Round of the F.A. Cup. A full house of 2,800, and the ‘Match of the Day’ cameras, saw the ‘Bluebirds’ win 4–1, with Ton Pentre's consolation goal being scored by Gareth Bees.

They were invited to be founder members when the League of Wales (now called the Cymru Premier) was created in 1992. Ton Pentre however preferred to be promoted to the highest level on their own merits, which was achieved the next year.

In each of its first two seasons in the League of Wales, Ton Pentre finished third. In 1995 they played in the UEFA Intertoto Cup.

Since 1996, Ton Pentre has won the Welsh League Championship six times in eight years (1997–98, 1998–99, 1999–2000, 2000–01, 2001–02 and 2004–05).

The team has also achieved two doubles adding the Welsh League Challenge Cup to their honours. Through the Welsh Cup they have proved time and time again that they can compete at the highest level with wins in the 2001–02 and 2002–03 seasons against Welsh Premier opposition. Both seasons the Rhondda side reached the Semi-finals first losing out to Barry Town 2–0 after extra-time and Cwmbran Town 2-1 having led the match eight minutes from time. Had Ton Pentre held out for the win they would have qualified for the UEFA Cup as Barry Town had secured European qualification through the league.

Following two seasons without silverware, Ton Pentre were again crowned Welsh League Champions in the 2004–05 season for the sixth time in eight seasons.

Ton Pentre suffered their first ever relegation in 2010, despite finishing 14th of 18, five teams were to go down, with the number of teams in the league system being cut and Ton Pentre were among the teams that dropped to Division Two for 2010–11.

== Honours ==
- Welsh Football League – Champions: (6) [Tier 1]: 1907–08, 1914–15, 1957–58, 1960–61, 1973–74, 1981–82
- Welsh Football League – Champions: (7) [Tier 2]: 1992–93, 1997–98, 1998–99, 1999–2000, 2000–01, 2001–02, 2004–05
- Welsh Cup – Runners-up: 1921–22
- South Wales FA Senior Cup – Winners: (12) 1907–08; 1908–09; 1909–10; 1914–15; 1920–21; 1947–48; 1960–61; 1961–62; 1963–64; 1982–83; 1992–93; 2022–23

== Notable former players ==
1. Players that have played/managed in the Football League or any foreign equivalent to this level (i.e. fully professional league).
2. Players with full international caps.
3. Players that hold a club record or have captained the club.

- (Wales) Moses Russell
- (Wales) Alex Lawless
- (Wales) Harry Hanford
- (England) Horace Jones
- (England) Trevor Lawless
- (Scotland) Teddy Roseboom
