= Pontardawe Town A.F.C. =

Association football club in Wales

Coordinates: 51°42′47.6″N 3°51′25.1″W

Pontardawe Town
- Full name: Pontardawe Town Association Football Club
- Founded: 1947
- Ground: Parc Ynysderw, Pontardawe
- Chairman: Jason Dykes
- Manager: Steve Berry
- League: Cymru South
- 2025–26: Ardal SW League, 2nd of 16 (promoted via play-off)
Home colours	Away colours

Pontardawe Town A.F.C. (Welsh: Clwb Pêl Droed Tref Pontardawe) are a football club based in the town of Pontardawe. They play in the Cymru South.

== History ==
Although the present club was founded in 1947, football in Pontardawe certainly stretches back over 100 years, into the closing years of the 19^{th} Century, when a Pontardawe club, run by industrialist CF Gilbertson, was among the members of the earliest Swansea League, and won the championship in 1899-1900. The club went on to join the Swansea & District League in the early 1900s, playing familiar names like Swansea Town, Morriston, Skewen and Clydach, as well as long forgotten ones such as Mond Nickel, York Place and Sketty. But honors were not forthcoming, and the club disbanded at the outbreak of the Second World War.

Reformed as Pontardawe Athletic in 1947, the club entered the Welsh League in 1948-49, playing in Division 2 (West). The first few post war years brought reasonable success at this level and in 1960-61 the club won the championship with 28 wins out of 32 league games. However, relegation came swiftly from Division 1 in 1961-62, Ponty finishing 19^{th} out of 20 to go back down to Division 2 (West) with Milford United. The club failed to bounce back the following season with Milford pipping Ponty by 4 points. For 1964-65 the Welsh League restructured and Ponty spent several seasons in Division 1 until relegation to Division 2 in 1978-79.

A period of comparative success followed in the early 1980s, with successive promotions as runners up in 1980-81 and 1981-82 behind Trelewis and Brecon Corinthians respectively taking the club back to the top-flight of the Welsh League. 1981-82 also brought success in the Welsh Cup with Dixie McHale's team reaching the fourth round, beating Maesteg Park (1-0) & Cardiff Corinthians (1-0) before losing at home 5-1 to Wrexham, containing Dai Davies, Joey Jones & Dixie McNeil.

Now competing in the Premier Division, 1982-83 saw Pontardawe lift the West Wales Senior Cup and finish 13^{th} in the league, however another restructuring saw Ponty lack a ground adequate for the Welsh League's new ‘National Division’ and they were relegated back into the middle division. Ponty went into decline again, slipping back to the third level of the Welsh League by the mid-1980s, quietly remaining there for over a decade.

In 1994-95 season, the club won the Division 3 championship, while 1997-98 the club also won the Division 2 league title to gain promotion to Division 1. Now adopting the Town name, Ponty came agonizingly close to winning Division 1 in 2001-02, losing out by a point to Ton Pentre. 2003-04 brought relegation however but this was short lived though as the club won Division 2 again in 2004-05.

For the next ten years the club played in Division 1 before relegation to Division 2 at the end of the 2014-15. Ponty also went close to League Cup success over this period, but on three occasions lost in the final to Goytre United (2005), Penrhiwceiber Rangers (2006) and AFC Porth (2014).

The club relocated to Parc Ynysderw in 2015 which is a ground now dedicated to the club and the committee has invested time and money to bring the ground to Tier 2 standard.

After the club has spent two seasons at Tier 2 in the JD Cymru South they were relegated by goal difference to play in the Ardal Southern West Division. After two seasons at Tier 3 level the club won the Ardal League South play off in May 2026 to return to the JD Cymru South after beating Cwmbran Town 2-0. This followed a FAW Trophy Final earlier in the month where they lost 3-1 to CPD Bangor City

== Current squad ==
As of 14 September 2023

Note: Flags indicate national team as defined under FIFA eligibility rules; some limited exceptions apply. Players may hold more than one non-FIFA nationality.

No.	Pos.	Nation	Player
—	GK	POL	Filip Lisczyk
—	GK	EST	Sten-Marek Orumaa
—	GK	WAL	Jac Jones
—	GK	WAL	Nathaniel Osborne
—	DF	WAL	Tyler Aylward
—	DF	WAL	Iwan Batchup
—	DF	WAL	Steve Berry
—	DF	WAL	Craig Davies
—	DF	WAL	James Dolman
—	DF	WAL	Jacob Evans
—	DF	WAL	Tim Georgievsky
—	DF	WAL	Harri Lawson
—	DF	WAL	Kieran Norman
—	DF	WAL	Matthew Richards
—	DF	WAL	Connah Troy
—	MF	WAL	Joe Clarke

No.	Pos.	Nation	Player
—	MF	WAL	Jack Cullen
—	MF	WAL	Owain Evans
—	MF	WAL	Ryan Kostromin
—	MF	LTU	Artiom Legavec
—	MF	WAL	Joe Lloyd
—	MF	WAL	Iwan Mcnab
—	MF	WAL	Mikey Morris
—	MF	WAL	Garry Taylor
—	MF	WAL	Cameron Williams
—	FW	WAL	Rio Booth
—	FW	WAL	Tom Davies
—	FW	WAL	Josh Dorward
—	FW	LVA	Andzjes Dubjaga
—	FW	LTU	Roman Legavec
—	FW	WAL	Oliver O'brien
—	FW	WAL	Callum Silcox

== Honours ==
1982–83 : West Wales Senior Cup Winners
1995–96 : Welsh League Division 3 Champions
1996–97 : Welsh Youth Cup Winners
1996–97 : Welsh Youth League Winners
2001–02 : Welsh League Division One Runners-up
2004–05 : Welsh League Cup Runners-up
2005–06 : Welsh League Cup Runners-up
2005–06 : Welsh League Division 2 Champions
2006–07 : Welsh League Youth Cup Runners-up
2007–08 : Welsh League Youth Cup Runners-up
2009–10 : Welsh League Reserve West Champions
2010–11 : Welsh League Reserve Cup Winners
2010–11 : Welsh League Youth Division West Champions
2010–11 : Neath League Division 2 Champions
2011–12 : Ystradgynlais 5 A Side Tournament Winners
2011–12 : Adidas Predator Cup 5 A Side Winners
2011–12 : SWFA Youth League West Champions
2011–12 : Welsh League Youth Division West Champions
2011–12 : Welsh League Reserve Division West Champions
2012–13 : Welsh League Youth Division West Champions
2012–13 : WWYAFL Division A Champions
2012–13 : WWYAFL S&R Trophies Cup Final Winners
2013–14 : Welsh League Cup Runners-up
2016-17 : Welsh League Youth Division West Champions
2016–17 : WWYAFL S&R Trophies Cup Final Winners
2017–18 : Welsh League Reserve Division West Champions
2018-19 : WWYAFL Champions
2018-19 : FAW Trophy Runners-up
2021–22 : Ardal SW Champions
2021–22 : Ardal SW Champions
2025–26 : FAW Trophy Runners-up

2025-26 : Ardal League South Play Off Winners

== Staff ==
- President: Herbie Probert
- Chairman: Jason Dykes
- Secretary: Gary Thomas
- Team Manager : Christian Evans
- 1st Team Manager: Kyle Cockings
- 1st Team Assistant Manager : Jason Dykes
- 1st Team Coaches: Jon Meacock, Corey Bevan
- Academy Managers : Kevin Hodder, Andrew Hodder
- Head of Goalkeeping : Mark Smith
- Sports Therapist : Claire Parker
- Development Team Managers : Jon Meacock
- Under 18s Team Managers : Anthony Morgan, Kian Pickman
