= 2021–22 Welsh League Cup =

Nathaniel MG Cup

Tournament details
- Country: Wales
- Dates: 16 July 2021 – 6 February 2022
- Teams: 46

Final positions
- Champions: Connah's Quay Nomads (3rd title)
- Runners-up: Cardiff Met University

Tournament statistics
- Matches played: 45
- Goals scored: 174 (3.87 per match)
- All statistics correct as of 6 February 2022.

The 2021–22 Welsh League Cup (known for sponsorship purposes as The Nathaniel MG Cup) was the 30th season of the Welsh League cup competition, which was established in 1992. The reigning champions were Connah's Quay Nomads.

== Format ==
- 44 clubs in the Cymru Premier, Cymru North and Cymru South leagues will enter the season's League Cup.
- Newport County and Denbigh Town were awarded the two wildcard spots for the current season.
- In the first round, the wildcard entrants were placed one in each section, joining 13 clubs from each of the Cymru North and South
- Three teams from each of the Cymru North and Cymru South were awarded byes in the first round, and along with the 12 Cymru Premier teams join the competition in the Second round.

== Access List ==
Round	Main date	Number of fixtures	Clubs	New Entries	Leagues entering at this round
First round Northern & Southern	17 July 2021	Northern: 7 Southern: 7	Northern: 14; Southern:14	28	Northern: 13 Cymru North teams 1 Wildcard team Southern: 1 Wildcard team 13 Cymru South clubs
Second round Northern & Southern	7 August 2021	Northern: 8 Southern: 8	Northern: 16; Southern:16	18	12 Cymru Premier clubs 6 Cymru North/South clubs
Third round Northern & Southern	21 September 2021	8	16	None	
Quarter-finals; Northern & Southern	26 October 2021	4	8	None	
Semi-finals	26 & 27 November 2021	2	4	None	
Final	6 February 2022	1	2	None	

== First round ==
The draw for the first round took place on 24 June 2021. The game between Port Talbot Town and Swansea University was postponed on 16 July after two Port Talbot players tested positive for COVID-19 and the Port Talbot squad was told to self-isolate by Welsh health authorities. Port Talbot Town subsequently forfeited the match in line with the approach adopted by the Football Association of Wales for the 2021–22 season's cup matches in relation to teams unable to play cup games due to Coronavirus infections.

=== Northern ===
17 July 2021	Airbus UK Broughton (2)	1–1 (6—5 p)	Guilsfield (2)	Broughton
	Gareth Edwards 41'	Report	Adam Jenkins 90+1'	Stadium: The Airfield; Referee: Aled Williams
	Penalties
	Nathan Brown (penalty missed); Callum Humphries (penalty scored); Owen Payne (penalty missed); Oli Lanceley (penalty scored); Finn Savage (penalty scored); Gareth Edwards (penalty scored); Iwan Jones (penalty scored); Ryan Edwards (penalty scored)		Chris Cathrall (penalty scored); Gareth Mansell (penalty scored); Iwan Lewis (penalty missed); Adam Jenkins (penalty missed); Greg Draper (penalty missed); Jamie Hyne (penalty scored); Aaron Lloyd (penalty scored); Andrew Ford (penalty scored); Spencer Parrish (penalty missed)

16 July 2021	Bangor City (2)	5–0	Holyhead Hotspur (2)	Bangor
	Alex Boss 35', 52'; Dante Isla Cacciavillani 59'; Mello 80', 85'			Stadium: Nantporth; Attendance: 150; Referee: Mark James

17 July 2021	Holywell Town (2)	2–1	Colwyn Bay (2)	Holywell
	Daniel Sullivan 69'; Daniel Andrews 75'		Ilan Hughes 24'	Stadium: Halkyn Road; Referee: John Jones

16 July 2021	Llandudno (2)	3–3 (3—0 p)	Denbigh Town (3)	Llandudno
	Dean Seagar 37'; Max Moore 51', 80'	Report	Mark Roberts 22'; Paul Fleming 84'; Daniel Clarke 90+5'	Stadium: Maesdu Park; Referee: Conor Charlton-Fleming
	Penalties
	Lee Thomas (penalty scored); Shaun Cavanagh (penalty scored); Guto Wiiliams (penalty scored)		Kristian Pierce (penalty missed); Mark Roberts (penalty missed); Daniel Clarke (penalty missed)

17 July 2021	Llangefni Town (2)	1–2	Prestatyn Town (2)	Llangefni
	Gari Owen 82'		Ian Kearney 46'; Ashley Ruane 68'	Stadium: Cae Bob Parry; Referee: James Walker

17 July 2021	Llanidloes Town (2)	2–3	Gresford Athletic (2)	Llanidloes
	Ashley Owen 10'; D. Reynolds 77'		Joseph Chaplin 30'; Matthew Worrall 60'; Samuel Molyneux 88'	Stadium: Victoria Park; Referee: Alex Livesey

17 July 2021	Llanrhaeadr (2)	1–4	Penrhyncoch (2)	Llanrhaeadr-ym-Mochnant
	Liam Sklenar 42'		Geoff Kellaway 30'; Joshua Shaw 40', 85'; Ifan Burrel 67'	Stadium: The Recreation Field; Referee: Cheryl Foster

=== Southern ===
16 July 2021	Briton Ferry Llansawel (2)	2–2 (3—4 p)	Pontypridd Town (2)	Briton Ferry
	Luke Bowen 37(p)'; Liam McCreesh 87'	Report	Gavin Beddard 35'; Lee Baldock 90'	Stadium: Old Road; Attendance: 202; Referee: Ryan Kenny
	Penalties
	Luke Bowen (penalty scored); Rory Healy (penalty missed); Alex Gammond (penalty scored); Liam McCreesh (penalty scored); Warren Hudson (penalty missed)		Lee Baldock (penalty scored); Luke Gullick (penalty missed); Gavin Beddard (penalty scored); Aiden Lewis (penalty scored); Shane Parry (penalty scored)

17 July 2021	Cambrian & Clydach Vale BGC (2)	4–1	Carmarthen Town (2)	Clydach Vale
	Liam Reed 12'; Josh Bull 30'; Cam Strinati 35'; Sam Jones 77'		Noah Daley 60'	Stadium: King George's New Field; Referee: Benjamin Williams

17 July 2021	Cwmbran Celtic (2)	3–0	Afan Lido (2)	Cwmbran
	Lewis Iles 10'; Thomas Meechan 25', 41'			Stadium: Celtic Park; Attendance: 105; Referee: Kim Fisher

16 July 2021	Llanelli Town (2)	5–0	Newport County (–)	Llanelli
	Kyle Copp 19'; Miles John 23'; Lewis Reed 25'; Zac Brown 61(p)'; Gavin Jones 69'			Stadium: Stebonheath Park; Referee: Alex McInch

17 July 2021	Llantwit Major (2)	3–3 (2—4 p)	Risca United (2)	Llantwit Major
	Thomas Walters 1(p)'; Joshua Jones 31', 41'	Report	Leon Thomas 19'; Taylor Marsh 57'; Jordan Thomas 68'	Stadium: Windmill Ground; Attendance: 68; Referee: Joshua Howells
	Penalties
	Thomas Walters (penalty scored); Josh Morgan (penalty missed); Goldsworthy (penalty scored); Ioan Emanuel (penalty missed)		Tom Berry (penalty scored); Lewis Ellis (penalty scored); Callum Porter (penalty scored); Arthur Furness (penalty scored)

Forfeit to Swansea University	Port Talbot Town (2)	–	Swansea University (2)

17 July 2021	Trefelin BGC (2)	2–0	Taff's Well (2)	Port Talbot
	Jamie Latham 68'; Ryan Griffiths 85'			Stadium: Ynys Park; Referee: Teifion Cook

== Second round ==
The draw for the Second round took place on 21 July 2021. All ties were played 6 and 7 August. The tie between Llandudno and Connah's Quay Nomads was reversed with Connah's Quay Nomads hosting the game instead of Llandudno.

=== Northern ===
6 August 2021	Airbus UK Broughton (2)	3—2	Buckley Town (2)	Broughton
19:45	George Peers 10'; Adam Davies 18', 80'		Leonard Hamilton 54', 79'	Stadium: The Airfield; Attendance: 315; Referee: Aaron Jones

6 August 2021	Connah's Quay Nomads (1)	2—0	Llandudno (2)	Connah's Quay
19:45	Jordan Davies 6'; Thomas Moore 70'			Stadium: Deeside Stadium; Referee: Thomas Owen

6 August 2021	Conwy Borough (2)	1—3	Holywell Town (2)	Conwy
19:45	C, McGonigle 7'		Mark Winslade 12'; Daniel Andrews 32 (p)'; David Hayes 38'	Stadium: Y Morfa Stadium; Referee: Alex Livesey

7 August 2021	Flint Town United (1)	1—1 (1–3 p)	Bala Town (1)	Flint
14:30	Benjamin Nash 84'		David Edwards 24 (p)'	Stadium: Cae-y-Castell; Attendance: 240; Referee: Simon Evans
	Penalties
	Alex Jones (penalty missed); Daniel Harrison (penalty scored); Samuel Hart (penalty missed); Ben Maher (penalty missed)		David Edwards (penalty scored); Bradley Burgess (penalty scored); Calum Woods (penalty scored); Antony Kay (penalty missed)

7 August 2021	Gresford Athletic (2)	0—1	Bangor City (2)	Gresford
14:30			Dante Isla Cacciavillani 16'	Stadium: Clappers Lane; Attendance: 105; Referee: Nicholas Platt

7 August 2021	Penrhyncoch (2)	2—1	The New Saints (1)	Penrhyn-coch
14:30	Taylor Watts 45 (p)'; Ifan Burrell 47'		Beau Cornish 57'	Stadium: Cae Baker; Referee: Bryn Markham-Jones

6 August 2021	Prestatyn Town (2)	3—0	Cefn Druids (1)	Prestatyn
19:45	Ashley Ruane 13'; Dominic Elsey-McHugh 32'; Paul Johnson 41'			Stadium: Bastion Road; Referee: John Jones

6 August 2021	Ruthin Town (2)	0—3	Caernarfon Town (1)	Ruthin
19:00			Cai Jones 11'; Sion Bradley 30'; Noah Edwards 60'	Stadium: Memorial Playing Fields; Attendance: 338; Referee: Mark Petch

=== Southern ===
6 August 2021	Aberystwyth Town (1)	1—1 (5—4 p)	Penybont (1)	Aberystwyth
20:00	Mathew Jones 82 (p)'		Samuel Snaith 5'	Stadium: Park Avenue; Referee: Robert Jenkins
	Penalties
	Mathew Jones (penalty scored); Thomas Rimmer (penalty scored); Jack Thorn (penalty scored); David Evans (penalty scored); Harry Franklin (penalty missed); Rhys Davies (penalty missed); Owain Jones (penalty scored)		Kane Owen (penalty scored); Samuel Snaith (penalty scored); James Waite (penalty missed); Mael Davies (penalty scored); Ashley Evans (penalty scored); Daniel Jefferies (penalty missed); Lewis Harling (penalty missed)

6 August 2021	Ammanford (2)	0—4	Cardiff Metropolitan University (1)	Ammanford
19:45			Emyln Lewis 4'; Adam Roscrow 15'; Matthew Chubb 66'; Christopher Baker 86'	Stadium: The Rec; Attendance: 412; Referee: Benjamin Williams

7 August 2021	Barry Town United (1)	5—0	Llanelli Town (2)	Barry
14:30	Marcus Day 14', 22'; Luke Cooper 19'; Kayne McLaggon 79'; Theo Wharton 85'			Stadium: Jenner Park Stadium; Referee: Alex McInch

7 August 2021	Cambrian & Clydach Vale BGC (2)	2—4	Newtown (1)	Clydach Vale
14:30	Sam Jones 14', 61 (p)'		Aaron Williams 39 (p)', 41', 49 (p)', 73'	Stadium: King George's New Field; Referee: Daniel Richardson

7 August 2021	Cwmbran Celtic (2)	1—2	Pontypridd Town (2)	Cwmbran
14:30	Thomas Meechan 40'		Samuel Johnson 55', 76'	Stadium: Celtic Park; Attendance: 104; Referee: Kris Hames

7 August 2021	Haverfordwest County (1)	3—0	Goytre United (2)	Haverfordwest
14:30	Kieran Lewis 76', 90+3'; H. Jones 90+1'			Stadium: Bridge Meadow Stadium; Referee: George Nemes

7 August 2021	Trefelin BGC (2)	2—0	Risca United (2)	Port Talbot
14:30	Sean Handbury 3', 88'			Stadium: Ynys Park; Referee: Teifion Cook

6 August 2021	Undy Athletic (2)	1—1 (5—3 p)	Swansea University (2)	Undy
19:00	Haris Thomas 90+3'		Nick Hyden 30'	Stadium: The Causeway; Referee: Ryan Kenny
	Penalties
	Oliver Smith (penalty scored); Christopher Parry (penalty scored); James Gidney (penalty scored); James Barnes (penalty scored); Samuel Thomas (penalty scored)		Harry Huddart (penalty scored); Elliot Jones (penalty scored); Nick Hyden (penalty scored); (penalty missed)

== Third round ==
The draw for the Third round took place on 11 August 2021. All ties were played 21 and 22 September.

=== Northern ===
21 September 2021	Bangor City (2)	0—0 (7—8 p)	Bala Town (1)	Bangor
19:45				Stadium: Nantporth; Attendance: 220; Referee: Aaron Wyn Jones
	Penalties
	Mello (penalty missed); Ignacio Torres (penalty scored); Agustin Zicarelli (penalty scored); Tyler Garratt (penalty scored); Dante Isla Cacciavillani (penalty scored); David Carty (penalty scored); Philippe Edmonds (penalty scored); Federico Tobler (penalty scored); Jack Walsh (penalty missed); Daniel Mullarkey (penalty missed)		Chris Venables (penalty missed); Calum Woods (penalty scored); Bradley Bauress (penalty scored); Paul Rutherford (penalty scored); Lassana Mendes (penalty scored); Anthony Stephens (penalty scored); Oliver Shannon (penalty scored); Danny Walker-Rice (penalty scored); Oliver Southern (penalty missed); Nathan Peate (penalty scored)

21 September 2021	Connah's Quay Nomads (1)	6—3	Airbus UK Broughton (2)	Connah's Quay
19:45	Jamie Insall 4', 13', 74'; Declan Poole 16'; George Hogan 67'; Byron Harrison 77'		George Peers 23'; Oliver Lanceley 26'; Callum Humphries 34'	Stadium: Deeside Stadium; Referee: Mark Petch

21 September 2021	Newtown (1)	5—0	Caernarfon Town (1)	Newtown
19:45	Jamie Breese 34'; Fumpa Mwandwe 45'; Nick Rushton 56'; Aaron Williams 68'; Craig Williams 73'			Stadium: Latham Park; Attendance: 211; Referee: Alex McInch

21 September 2021	Prestatyn Town (2)	3—4	Holywell Town (2)	Prestatyn
19:45	Jamie Reed 26'; Ben Barratt 45+1'; Wesley Baynes 70'		Oliver Buckley 8'; Jake Cooke 58'; Zebb Edwards 76'; Dylan Allshorn 77'	Stadium: Bastion Road; Referee: Thomas Owen

=== Southern ===
21 September 2021	Aberystwyth Town (1)	2—5	Cardiff Metropolitan University (1)	Aberystwyth
20:00	Mathew Jones 50'; Jonathan Evans 80'		Emyln Lewis 11'; Daniel Warre 33', 45'; Liam Warman 75', 90+9'	Stadium: Park Avenue; Attendance: 258; Referee: Benjamin Williams

21 September 2021	Barry Town United (1)	3—0	Trefelin BGC (2)	Barry
19:45	Robbie Patten 53'; Nathaniel Jarvis 62', 73'			Stadium: Jenner Park Stadium; Attendance: 224; Referee: Richard Harrington

21 September 2021	Haverfordwest County (1)	5—0	Undy Athletic (2)	Haverfordwest
19:45	Mason Jones-Thomas 26'; Touray Sisay 29', 47'; Gyles Thompson (o.g.); Danny Williams 74'			Stadium: Bridge Meadow Stadium; Attendance: 300; Referee: Ryan Kenny

22 September 2021	Penrhyncoch (2)	1—3	Pontypridd Town (2)	Penrhyn-coch
19:45	Ifan Burrel 9'		Drew Fahiya 12'; Aidan Lewis 22'; Taylor Marsh 83'	Stadium: Cae Baker; Referee: Robert Jenkins

== Quarter-finals ==
The draw was made on 23 September with this being the last round where clubs were placed in regional draws. All ties were played on 26 October.

=== Northern ===
26 October 2021	Bala Town (1)	3—1	Newtown (1)	Bala
	Paul Rutherford 16'; Chris Venables 25'; Kieran Mill-Evans 57' (o.g.)		James Rowland 12'	Stadium: Maes Tegid; Attendance: 268; Referee: Iwan Griffith

26 October 2021	Connah's Quay Nomads (1)	4—0	Holywell Town (2)	Connah's Quay
	Byron Harrison 9'; Jordan Davies 49' (p); Jamie Insall 77'; Aron Williams 82'			Stadium: Deeside Stadium; Attendance: 346; Referee: Mark Petch

=== Southern ===
26 October 2021	Barry Town United (1)	7—1	Pontypridd Town (2)	Barry
	Kayne McLaggon 39', 59', 71'; Marcus Day 48'; Curtis McDonald 53'; Jordan Cotterill 66'; Rhys Kavanagh 85'		Gavin Beddard 45+2'	Stadium: Jenner Park Stadium; Attendance: 612; Referee: Alex McInch

26 October 2021	Haverfordwest County (1)	0—2	Cardiff Metropolitan University (1)	Haverfordwest
			Harry Owen 51'; Adam Roscrow 52'	Stadium: Bridge Meadow Stadium; Attendance: 300; Referee: Ryan Kenny

== Semi-finals ==
The semi finals saw both remaining North Walian and South Walian clubs drawn together.

26 November 2021	Bala Town (1)	1—4	Connah's Quay Nomads (1)	Bala
19:45	Anthony Stephens 30'		Paulo Mendes 43', 67'; Craig Curran 65'; Jamie Mullan 72'	Stadium: Maes Tegid; Attendance: 274; Referee: Tom Owen

27 November 2021	Cardiff Metropolitan University (1)	3—2	Barry Town United (1)	Cardiff
14:30	Adam Roscrow 32'; Emlyn Lewis 36'; Eliot Evans 55'		Jordan Cotterill 6'; Nathaniel Jarvis 90+2'	Stadium: Cyncoed Campus Stadium; Attendance: 394; Referee: Lee Evans

== Final ==
6 February 2022	Cardiff Metropolitan University (1)	0—0 (9—10 p)	Connah's Quay Nomads (1)	Bridgend
12:30		Match report		Stadium: SDM Glass Stadium; Attendance: 822; Referee: Dean John
	Penalties
	S. Jones (penalty scored); Alex Lang (penalty scored); Joe Evans (penalty missed); Matt Chubb (penalty scored); Kyle McCarthy (penalty scored); Emlyn Lewis (penalty missed); Liam Warman (penalty scored); CJ Craven (penalty scored); Eliot Evans (penalty scored); Chris Baker (penalty scored); Tom Price (penalty scored); Eliot Evans (penalty missed)		Kris Owens (penalty scored); Callum Morris (penalty scored); Oliver Byrne (penalty scored); Paulo Mendes (penalty missed); Declan Poole (penalty scored); Craig Curran (penalty scored); George Horan (penalty scored); Neal Eardley (penalty scored); Aeron Edwards (penalty scored); Callum Morris (penalty scored); Danny Holmes (penalty scored); Jamie Insall (penalty missed)
