= 2009–10 Welsh League Cup group stage =

The 2009–10 Welsh League Cup group stage matches took place between 18 August and 20 October 2009. The draw for the eight groups took place on 29 June 2009.

At the completion of the group stage, the top team in each group will advance to play in the Quarter finals, along with the two best placed runners up.

== Groups ==
Key to colours in group tables
Teams progressed to the quarter-finals
Best runner-up that progressed to the quarter-finals

=== Group 1 ===
| Team | Pld | W | D | L | GF | GA | GD | Pts |
|---|---|---|---|---|---|---|---|---|
| Port Talbot Town | 4 | 3 | 1 | 0 | 8 | 3 | +5 | 10 |
| Neath Athletic | 4 | 1 | 1 | 2 | 4 | 8 | -4 | 4 |
| Carmarthen Town | 4 | 0 | 2 | 2 | 3 | 5 | -2 | 2 |

18 August 2009
19:30

| Port Talbot Town | 2–1 | Neath Athletic |
|---|---|---|
| Holland 47'; Rose 82' | Report | Spendiff 88' |

The GenQuip Stadium, Port Talbot
Attendance: 182
Referee: B James

25 August 2009
19:30

| Neath Athletic | 0–0 | Carmarthen Town |
|---|---|---|
| | Report |

The Gnoll, Neath
Attendance: 143
Referee: W Stephens

1 September 2009
19:30

| Carmarthen Town | 0–1 | Port Talbot Town |
|---|---|---|
| | Report | Holland 41' |

Richmond Park, Carmarthen
Attendance: 154
Referee: C Richards

22 September 2009
19:30

| Carmarthen Town | 2–3 | Neath Athletic |
|---|---|---|
| Hicks 10'; Walters 27' | Report | Shaw 13'; Spendiff 65'; Hillier 67' |

Richmond Park, Carmarthen
Attendance: 137
Referee: C Richards

29 September 2009
19:30

| Neath Athletic | 1–4 | Port Talbot Town |
|---|---|---|
| Howard 80' | Report | Rose 7', 25' (pen.); Fahiya 60', 62' |

The Gnoll, Neath
Attendance: 139
Referee: D Adie

6 October 2009
19:30

| Port Talbot Town | 1–1 | Carmarthen Town |
|---|---|---|
| Thomas 47' | Report | Hicks 31' |

The GenQuip Stadium, Port Talbot
Attendance: 111
Referee: K Morgan

=== Group 2 ===
| Team | Pld | W | D | L | GF | GA | GD | Pts |
|---|---|---|---|---|---|---|---|---|
| Llanelli | 4 | 2 | 2 | 0 | 13 | 4 | +9 | 8 |
| Aberystwyth Town | 4 | 1 | 2 | 1 | 5 | 11 | -6 | 5 |
| Haverfordwest County | 4 | 0 | 2 | 2 | 2 | 5 | -3 | 2 |

15 August 2009
19:30

| Aberystwyth Town | 0–0 | Haverfordwest County |
|---|---|---|
| | Report |

Park Avenue, Aberystwyth
Attendance: 176
Referee: W Stephens

25 August 2009
19:30

| Haverfordwest County | 1–1 | Llanelli |
|---|---|---|
| Williams 43' | Report | Jones 29' |

Bridge Meadow Stadium, Haverfordwest
Attendance: 290
Referee: B James

15 September 2009
19:30

| Haverfordwest County | 1–2 | Aberystwyth Town |
|---|---|---|
| Walters 89' | Report | Hughes 80'; Kellaway 87' |

Bridge Meadow Stadium, Haverfordwest
Attendance: 102
Referee: N Morgan

22 September 2009
19:30

| Llanelli | 2–3 | Neath Athletic |
|---|---|---|
| Foster 6'; Moses 84' | Report |

Stebonheath Park, Llanelli
Attendance: 136
Referee: W Tregonning

6 October 2009
19:30

| Aberystwyth Town | 2–2 | Llanelli |
|---|---|---|
| Kellaway 35'; Hughes 40' | Report | Moses 55'; Follows 63' |

Park Avenue, Aberystwyth
Attendance: 202
Referee: B James

20 October 2009
19:30

| Llanelli | 8–1 | Aberystwyth Town |
|---|---|---|
| Griffiths 11'; Moses 12', 43', 81', 88'; Corbisiero 29', 75' (pen.); Evans 36' (o.g.) | Report | Bowen 65' (pen.) |

Stebonheath Park, Llanelli
Attendance: 189
Referee: M Whitby

=== Group 3 ===
| Team | Pld | W | D | L | GF | GA | GD | Pts |
|---|---|---|---|---|---|---|---|---|
| Porthmadog | 4 | 2 | 0 | 2 | 9 | 4 | +5 | 7 |
| Gap Connah's Quay | 4 | 2 | 1 | 1 | 6 | 7 | -1 | 7 |
| Caersws | 4 | 0 | 2 | 2 | 2 | 6 | -4 | 2 |

18 August 2009
19:30

| Caersws | 0–0 | Gap Connah's Quay |
|---|---|---|
| | Report |

Recreation Ground, Caersws
Attendance: 142
Referee: J Swindley

25 August 2009
19:30

| Gap Connah's Quay | 3–2 | Porthmadog |
|---|---|---|
| McGregor 32'; McNutt 37' (pen.); Hayes 48' | Report | Roberts 28'; Davies 80' |

Deeside Stadium, Connah's Quay
Attendance: 102
Referee: B Markham-Jones

1 September 2009
19:30

| Porthmadog | 2–0 | Caersws |
|---|---|---|
| Evans 66', 71' | Report |

Y Traeth, Porthmadog
Attendance: 172
Referee: A Harms

8 September 2009
19:30

| Gap Connah's Quay | 3–1 | Caersws |
|---|---|---|
| McNutt 30'; Hayes 35'; Petrie 79' | Report | Lewis 47' (pen.) |

Deeside Stadium, Connah's Quay
Attendance: 115
Referee: M Bridges

22 September 2009
19:30

| Porthmadog | 4–0 | Gap Connah's Quay |
|---|---|---|
| Shannon 8', 89'; Gornall 12'; Thompson 75' | Report |

Y Traeth, Porthmadog
Attendance: 136
Referee: C LoFaro

6 October 2009
19:30

| Caersws | 1–1 | Porthmadog |
|---|---|---|
| Melia 14' | Report | Jones 38' |

Recreation Ground, Caersws
Attendance: 102
Referee: W Stephens

=== Group 4 ===
| Team | Pld | W | D | L | GF | GA | GD | Pts |
|---|---|---|---|---|---|---|---|---|
| Rhyl | 4 | 4 | 0 | 0 | 11 | 2 | +9 | 12 |
| Prestatyn Town | 4 | 1 | 1 | 2 | 5 | 7 | -2 | 4 |
| Airbus UK Broughton | 4 | 0 | 1 | 3 | 3 | 10 | -7 | 1 |

18 August 2009
19:30

| Prestatyn Town | 2–2 | Airbus UK Broughton |
|---|---|---|
| Fisher-Cooke 38'; Moran 67' | Report | McManus 86' (pen.); McIntosh 90' |

Bastion Road, Prestatyn
Attendance: 246
Referee: M Jones

25 August 2009
19:30

| Airbus UK Broughton | 1–2 | Rhyl |
|---|---|---|
| McManus 62' | Report | Hunt 36'; Owen 73' |

The Airfield, Broughton
Attendance: 131
Referee: J Swindley

1 September 2009
19:30

| Rhyl | 2–1 | Prestatyn Town |
|---|---|---|
| Naylor 37'; Connolly 85' | Report | Lewis 31' |

Belle Vue, Rhyl
Attendance: 412
Referee: K Parry

9 September 2009
19:30

| Airbus UK Broughton | 0–2 | Prestatyn Town |
|---|---|---|
| | Report | Rogers 4'; Hayes 47' |

The Airfield, Broughton
Attendance: 91
Referee: H Jones

22 September 2009
19:30

| Rhyl | 4–0 | Airbus UK Broughton |
|---|---|---|
| Connolly 10', 61'; Kirk 30'; Doran 41' | Report |

Belle Vue, Rhyl
Attendance: 305
Referee: L Evans

6 October 2009
19:30

| Prestatyn Town | 0–3 | Rhyl |
|---|---|---|
| | Report | Connolly 11'; Hunt 39'; Williams 85' |

Bastion Road, Prestatyn
Attendance: 224
Referee: L Evans

=== Group 5 ===
| Team | Pld | W | D | L | GF | GA | GD | Pts |
|---|---|---|---|---|---|---|---|---|
| Technogroup Welshpool Town | 4 | 3 | 1 | 0 | 11 | 6 | +7 | 10 |
| Bala Town | 4 | 2 | 1 | 1 | 7 | 3 | +4 | 7 |
| Elements Cefn Druids | 4 | 0 | 0 | 4 | 5 | 15 | -10 | 0 |

18 August 2009
19:30

| Elements Cefn Druids | 0–4 | Bala Town |
|---|---|---|
| | Report | Evans 29'; Moore 55'; Jones 63'; Roberts 70' |

Plaskynaston Lane, Cefn Mawr
Attendance: 117
Referee: A Harms

25 August 2009
19:30

| Bala Town | 1–2 | Technogroup Welshpool Town |
|---|---|---|
| Bell 83' (pen.) | Report | Peate 35', 56' |

Maes Tegid, Bala
Attendance: 253
Referee: C LoFaro

1 September 2009
19:30

| Technogroup Welshpool Town | 5–2 | Elements Cefn Druids |
|---|---|---|
| Davie 3' (pen.); Lamb 5', 84'; Harris 31'; Jenkins 90' | Report | Whitfield 23'; Tebble 90' |

Maes y Dre Recreation Ground, Welshpool
Attendance: 86
Referee: B Markham-Jones

8 September 2009
19:30

| Bala Town | 2–1 | Elements Cefn Druids |
|---|---|---|
| Lloyd 18'; Griffiths 62' | Report | Hesp 69' |

Maes Tegid, Bala
Attendance: 207
Referee: J Swindley

22 September 2009
19:30

| Technogroup Welshpool Town | 0–0 | Bala Town |
|---|---|---|
| | Report |

Maes y Dre Recreation Ground, Welshpool
Attendance: 101
Referee: M Bridges

6 October 2009
19:30

| Elements Cefn Druids | 2–4 | Technogroup Welshpool Town |
|---|---|---|
| Whitfield 17'; Hesp 19' | Report | Hughes 35', 65'; Pritchard 52'; Davies 54' |

Plaskynaston Lane, Cefn Mawr
Attendance: 41
Referee: K Parry

=== Group 6 ===
| Team | Pld | W | D | L | GF | GA | GD | Pts |
|---|---|---|---|---|---|---|---|---|
| The New Saints | 4 | 3 | 1 | 0 | 13 | 6 | +7 | 10 |
| Bangor City | 4 | 2 | 0 | 2 | 7 | 8 | -1 | 6 |
| Newtown | 4 | 0 | 1 | 3 | 5 | 11 | -6 | 1 |

15 August 2009
19:30

| Newtown | 1–2 | Bangor City |
|---|---|---|
| | Report | Smyth 35'; Sharp 54' |

Latham Park, Newtown
Attendance: 160
Referee: P Thomas

25 August 2009
19:30

| Bangor City | 0–2 | The New Saints |
|---|---|---|
| | Report | Abbot 35'; Wood 70' |

Farrar Road Stadium, Bangor
Attendance: 379
Referee: L Evans

1 September 2009
19:30

| The New Saints | 2–2 | Newtown |
|---|---|---|
| Abbot 74'; Marriott 90' | Report | Mitchell 18'; Breeze 67' |

Park Hall, Oswestry
Attendance: 156
Referee: J Swindley

15 September 2009
19:30

| Bangor City | 3–0 | Newtown |
|---|---|---|
| Stott 11'; Smyth 11', 76' | Report |

Farrar Road Stadium, Bangor
Attendance: 206
Referee: L Evans

22 September 2009
19:45

| The New Saints | 5–2 | Bangor City |
|---|---|---|
| Berkeley 34', 48'; Marriott 40', 85'; Williams 67' | Report | Sharp 38'; Stott 51' |

Park Hall, Oswestry
Attendance: 247
Referee: M Jones

20 October 2009
19:30

| Newtown | 2–4 | The New Saints |
|---|---|---|
| Marriott 14' (o.g.); Stephens 55' (pen.) | Report | Ruscoe 56'; Berkeley 64'; Jones 76'; Seargeant 79' |

Latham Park, Newtown
Attendance: 110
Referee: M Bridges
