= 2010–11 in Welsh football =

The 2010–11 season was the 136th season of competitive football in Wales.

== Men's national team ==
The home team is on the left column; the away team is on the right column.

Win Draw Loss

=== Friendly match ===
11 Aug 2010	Wales	5 – 1	Luxembourg	Parc y Scarlets, Llanelli
19:45 BST (UTC+01)	David Cotterill 35'; Joe Ledley 48' (pen.); Andy King 55'; Ashley Williams 78'; Craig Bellamy 82'	Report	Joël Kitenge 44'	Attendance: 4,500; Referee: Mattias Gestranius (Finland)

=== Euro 2012 Qualifying ===
The Welsh men's national team were drawn into UEFA Euro 2012 qualifying Group G.

All fixtures for this group were negotiated between the participants at a meeting in Frankfurt, Germany on 21 and 22 February 2010.

3 Sep 2010	Montenegro	1 – 0	Wales	(Montenegro) Podgorica City Stadium, Podgorica
19:30 CEST (UTC+02)	Mirko Vučinić 30'	Report		Attendance: 9,862; Referee: Anastassios Kakos (Greece)

8 Oct 2010	Wales	0 – 1	Bulgaria	Cardiff City Stadium, Cardiff
19:30 BST (UTC+01)		Report	48' Ivelin Popov	Attendance: 14,061; Referee: Jonas Eriksson (Sweden)

26 Mar 2011	Wales	0 – 2	England	Millennium Stadium, Cardiff
15:00 GMT (UTC)		Report	Frank Lampard 7' (pen.); Darren Bent 14'	Attendance: 68,959; Referee: O.Benquerença (Portugal)

=== Nations Cup ===
In February 2011 Wales would play the inaugural game of the new Nations Cup, which was staged in Dublin, Republic of Ireland during February and May 2011.

8 Feb 2011	Republic of Ireland	3 – 0	Wales	(Republic of Ireland) Aviva Stadium, Dublin
19:45 WET (UTC)	Darron Gibson 60'; Damien Duff 67'; Keith Fahey 83'	Report		Attendance: 19,783; Referee: Mark Courtney (Northern Ireland)

24 May 2011	Wales	1 – 3	Scotland	(Republic of Ireland) Aviva Stadium, Dublin
19:45 IST (UTC+01)	Robert Earnshaw 36'	report	James Morrison 55'; Kenny Miller 63'; Christophe Berra 70'	Attendance: 6,036; Referee: Raymond Crangle (Northern Ireland)

26 May 2011	Wales	2 – 0	Northern Ireland	(Republic of Ireland) Aviva Stadium, Dublin
19:45 IST (UTC+01)	Aaron Ramsey 36'; Robert Earnshaw 69'	report		Attendance: 529; Referee: Alan Kelly (Republic of Ireland)

== Women's national team ==
As hosts of the 2011 FIFA World Cup, Germany did not have to play qualifying.

=== Friendly matches ===
25 Aug 2010	Wales	8 – 1	Bulgaria	Rhosymedre Stadium, Rhosymedre
19:00 BST (UTC+01)	Jessica Fishlock 11'; Helen Lander 15', 51'; Jayne Ludlow 29'; Jasmin Dutton 60'; Cheryl Foster 60'; Gwennan Harries 74'; Nia Jones 89'		63' Gergana Tznakova	Attendance: 607; Referee: Bryn Markham-Jones (Wales)

13 Feb 2011	Wales	2 – 4	Scotland	Bridge Meadow Stadium, Haverfordwest
12:30 GMT (UTC+0)	Gwennan Harries 17'; Helen Lander 78'		33' Jane Ross; 44', 87'Hayley Lauder; 80'Joanne Love	Attendance: 200; Referee: Dean John (Wales)

20 Apr 2011	Wales	5 – 1	Luxembourg	Marston Stadium, Aberavon
18:00 BST (UTC+01)	Amie Lea 4', 38', 70'; Zoe Atkins 52', 90'		Amy Thompson 19'	Attendance: 200; Referee: Paul Fisher (Wales)

=== 2011 FIFA Women's World Cup qualification ===
21 Aug 2010	Wales	15 – 0	Azerbaijan	Latham Park, Newtown
15:00 BST (UTC+01)	Helen Lander 3', 7', 21', 36', 38', 72'; Gwennan Harries 13', 56', 66'; Jasmin Dutton 19'; Jessica Fishlock 59'; Sophie Ingle 65'; Michelle Emma Green 81', 83'; Kerrie Manley 90+2'	Report	44' Joël Kitenge	Attendance: 395; Referee: Paloma Quintero Siles (Spain)

25 Aug 2010	Sweden	5 – 1	Wales	(Sweden) Värendsvallen, Växjö
18:00 BST (UTC+01)	Lotta Schelin 12', 60'; Josefine Öqvist 45', 55', 71'	Report	81' Gwennan Harries	Attendance: 2,091; Referee: Silvia Tea Spinelli (Italy)

=== 2011 Algarve Cup ===
2 March 2011 Group stage	Portugal	3 – 1	Wales	(Portugal) Estádio Municipal, Vila Real de Santo António
18:00 WET (UTC+00)	Carla Couto 11', 56'; Edite Fernandes 18'		41' Loren Dykes	Referee: Estella De Olivera (Argentina)

4 March 2011 Group stage	Wales	2 – 1	Romania	(Portugal) Estádio Municipal Fernando Cabrita, Lagos
18:00 WET (UTC+00)	Jessica Fishlock 60'; Helen Lander 72'		40' Cosmina Duca	Referee: Carolina Gonzalez (Chile)

7 March 2011 Group stage	Chile	1 – 2	Wales	(Portugal) Estádio Algarve, Faro
18:00 WET (UTC+00)	Daniele Zamora 74'		24', 62' Jessica Fishlock	Referee: Sung Mi Cha (South Korea)

9 March 2011 7th place match	Wales	1 – 2	China	(Portugal) Estádio Municipal De Albufeira, Albufeira
11:00 WET (UTC+00)	Helen Lander 58'		3' You Jia; 54' Gu Yasha	Referee: Silvia E Reyes Juarez (Peru)

== Honours ==
=== League football ===
Competition	Winner	Details	Match report	
Welsh Premier League	Bangor City	2010–11 Welsh Premier League	welsh-premier.com	
Welsh Cup	Llanelli	2010–11 Welsh Cup beat Bangor City 4–1 in final	welsh-premier.com	
Welsh League Cup	The New Saints	2010–11 Welsh League Cup beat Llanelli 4-3	aet = yes in final	welsh-premier.com

=== North Wales ===
Competition	Winner	Details	Match report
Cymru Alliance	Gap Connah's Quay	2010–11 Cymru Alliance	
Welsh National League (Wrexham Area) Premier Division	Penycae	2010–11 Welsh National League (Wrexham Area) Premier Division	
Welsh National League (Wrexham Area) Division One	Penyffordd	2010–11 Welsh National League (Wrexham Area) Division One	
Welsh Alliance League Division One	Conwy United	2010–11 Welsh Alliance League Division One	
Welsh Alliance League Division Two	Caernarfon Wanderers	2010–11 Welsh Alliance League Division Two	
Mid Wales Football League Division One	Llanrhaeadr	22010–11 Mid Wales Football League Division One	
Mid Wales Football League Division Two	Montgomery Town	2010–11 Mid Wales Football League Division Two	

=== South Wales ===
Competition	Winner	Details	Match report
Welsh Football League Division One	Bryntirion Athletic	2010–11 Welsh Football League Division One	
Welsh Football League Division Two	Ton Pentre	2010–11 Welsh Football League Division Two	
Welsh Football League Division Three	Monmouth Town	2010–11 Welsh Football League Division Three	

== Welsh clubs' performance in Europe ==
Team	Contest and round	Opponent	1st leg score*	2nd leg score*	Aggregate score
The New Saints	Champions League 2nd Qualifying Round	(Republic of Ireland) Bohemians	0 – 1 (A)	4 – 0 (H)	W 4 – 1
The New Saints	Champions League 3rd Qualifying Round	(Belgium) RSC Anderlecht	1 – 3 (H)	0 – 3 (A)	L 1 – 6
The New Saints	Europa League Playoff Round	(Bulgaria) CSKA Sofia	0 – 3 (A)	2 – 2 (H)	L 2 – 5
Bangor City	Europa League 2nd Qualifying Round	(Finland) FC Honka	1 – 1 (A)	2 – 1 (H)	W 3 – 2
Bangor City	Europa League 3rd Qualifying Round	(Portugal) C.S. Marítimo	2 – 8 (A)	1 – 2 (H)	L 3 – 10
Port Talbot Town	Europa League 1st Qualifying Round	(Finland) Turun Palloseura	1 – 3 (A)	0 – 4 (H)	L 1 – 7
Llanelli	Europa League 1st Qualifying Round	(Lithuania) FK Tauras Tauragė	2 – 2 (H)	2 – 2 (A)	L 4 – 5^{(a.e.t)}^{[nb1]}

* Welsh club score shown first.

== European qualification ==
Competition	Qualifiers	Reason for Qualification
UEFA Champions League Second qualifying round	Bangor City	1st in Welsh Premier League
UEFA Europa League First qualifying round	The New Saints	2nd in Welsh Premier League
UEFA Europa League First qualifying round	Neath	3rd in Welsh Premier League (qualification awarded as end of season 2010–11 Welsh Premier League UEFA Europa League play-offs winners)
UEFA Europa League Second qualifying round	Llanelli	Welsh Cup winners

== League Tables ==
=== Welsh Premier League ===
			P	W	D	L	F	A	GD	Pts
C	1	Bangor City	32	22	4	6	80	44	+36	70
EL	2	The New Saints	32	20	8	4	87	34	+53	68
EL	3	Neath	32	16	10	6	62	41	+21	58
EL	4	Llanelli	32	15	8	9	58	41	+17	53
	5	Prestatyn Town	32	10	10	12	44	46	−2	40
	6	Port Talbot Town	32	8	12	12	37	48	−11	36
	7	Aberystwyth Town	32	11	9	12	42	54	−12	42
	8	Airbus UK Broughton	32	11	8	13	53	52	+1	41
	9	Newtown	32	8	11	13	40	55	−15	35
	10	Carmarthen Town	32	10	5	17	39	64	−25	35
	11	Bala Town	32	10	3	19	41	57	−16	33
R	12	Haverfordwest County	32	5	4	23	30	77	−47	19

Leading goalscorer: Rhys Griffiths (Llanelli) - 25

=== Cymru Alliance ===
			P	W	D	L	F	A	GD	Pts
C	1	Gap Connah's Quay	30	23	2	5	89	33	+56	71
	2	Rhyl	30	19	5	6	73	32	+41	62
	3	Cefn Druids	30	18	6	6	60	29	+31	60
	4	Rhos Aelwyd	30	15	6	9	68	64	+4	51
	5	Caersws	30	15	5	10	59	49	+10	50
	6	Llandudno	30	13	10	7	50	35	+15	49
	7	Flint Town United	30	13	7	10	64	55	+9	46
	8	Porthmadog	30	14	4	12	59	54	+5	46
	9	Buckley Town	30	13	6	11	46	48	−2	45
	10	Llangefni Town	30	11	4	15	67	64	+3	37
	11	Penrhyncoch	30	9	10	11	49	56	−7	37
	12	Ruthin Town	30	11	4	15	39	58	−19	37
	13	Ruthin Town	30	8	6	16	43	56	−13	30
R	14	Rhydymwyn	30	4	6	20	27	82	−55	18
R	15	Rhayader Town	30	4	3	23	34	76	−42	15
R	16	Technogroup Welshpool Town	30	5	6	19	39	76	−37	3^{[nb2]}

Leading goalscorer: Gary O'Toole (Gap Connah's Quay) - 31

=== Welsh Football League First Division ===
			P	W	D	L	F	A	GD	Pts
C	1	Bryntirion Athletic	30	23	1	6	76	27	+49	70
P	2	Afan Lido	30	20	5	5	63	28	+35	65
	3	Cambrian & Clydach Vale	30	17	6	7	68	37	+31	57
	4	Pontardawe Town	30	15	6	9	54	44	+10	51
	5	Caerau (Ely)	30	15	4	11	66	52	+14	49
	6	Bridgend Town	30	14	5	11	60	47	+13	47
	7	West End	30	13	6	11	57	47	+10	45
	8	Cardiff Corinthians	30	12	4	14	58	52	+6	40
	9	Taff's Well	30	12	3	15	47	57	−10	39
	10	Aberaman Athletic	30	12	3	15	58	74	−16	39
	11	Goytre United	30	10	8	12	47	53	−6	38
	12	Cwmbran Celtic	30	10	7	13	45	50	−5	37
	13	Barry Town	30	9	8	13	39	55	−16	35
R	14	Caldicot Town	30	8	3	19	37	48	−11	27
R	15	Garden Village	30	6	7	17	41	75	−34	25
R	16	Penrhiwceiber Rangers	30	4	4	22	27	97	−70	16

== Welsh Cup ==
7 May 2011
15:00 BST (UTC+01)
2011 Welsh Cup Final

Bangor City	1 – 4	Llanelli
Alan Bull 51'	Report	15', 60' Rhys Griffiths; 20' Craig Moses; 64' Chris Venables

Parc y Scarlets, Llanelli
Attendance: 1,719
Referee: Mark Petch (Deganwy)

Bangor City	Llanelli

== Welsh League Cup ==
2 May 2011
15:00 BST (UTC+01)
2011 Welsh League Cup Final

Llanelli	3 – 4 (a.e.t.)	The New Saints
Chris Holloway 78'; Jordan Follows 86'; Craig Moses 87'	Report	43' Aeron Edwards; 75', 89' Chris Sharp; 120' Scott Ruscoe

Park Avenue, Aberystwyth
Attendance: 310
Referee: Brian James (Rhydyfelin)

Llanelli	The New Saints

== See also ==
- Wales national football team
- Wales women's national football team
- 2010–11 Welsh Premier League
- 2010–11 Cymru Alliance
- 2010–11 Welsh Football League Division One
- 2010–11 Welsh Cup
- 2010–11 Welsh League Cup

== Notes ==
1. ^{nb1} After 90 minutes of play Llanelli drew 2 – 2 with Tauras Tauragė in the second leg. This meant the score was 4 – 4 on aggregate and after 30 minutes of extra time Tauras Tauragė would progress to the next round after the game finished 5 – 4.
2. ^{nb2} Technogroup Welshpool Town deducted 15 points for fielding ineligible players and a further three points for failing to fulfil a fixture
