= 2011–12 Welsh League Cup =

2011–2012 Welsh League Cup
Loosemores League Cup

Tournament details
- Country: Wales; England
- Teams: 12

Final positions
- Champions: Afan Lido (3rd title)
- Runners-up: Newtown

The 2011-2012 Welsh League Cup was the 20th season of the Welsh League Cup, which was established in 1992. Afan Lido became champions for the third time after beating Newtown 3–2 in a penalty shoot-out after a 1–1 draw in the final.

== First round ==
=== First leg ===
20 January 2012	Airbus UK Broughton	4–1	Bala Town	The Airfield, Broughton
19:30	Cadwallader 18' (pen.), 44', 69'; Rule 61'	Report	Allen 77' (o.g.)	Attendance: 223; Referee: Petch

20 January 2012	Carmarthen Town	1–0	Port Talbot Town	Richmond Park, Carmarthen
19:30	Christopher 37'	Report		Attendance: 230; Referee: John

21 January 2012	Afan Lido	2–0	Aberystwyth Town	Marston Stadium, Aberavon
15:45	Hill 12' (pen.); Jones 26'	Report		Attendance: 212; Referee: Harrington

21 January 2012	Prestatyn Town	1–1	Newtown	Bastion Road, Prestatyn
14:30	Fisher-Cooke 28'	Report	Wright 62'	Attendance: 171; Referee: Jones

Source: welsh-premier.com

=== Second leg ===
31 January 2012	Aberystwyth Town	1–0 (1–2 agg.)	Afan Lido	Park Avenue, Aberystwyth
19:30	Nalborski 65'	Report		Attendance: 152; Referee: James

7 February 2012	Bala Town	2–1 (3–5 agg.)	Airbus UK Broughton	Maes Tegid, Bala
19:30	Sheridan 45'; Hunt 81' (pen.)	Report	G.Rule 25'; R.Rule (red card) 90'	Attendance: 153; Referee: Evans

14 February 2012	Port Talbot Town	3–1 (3–2 agg.)	Carmarthen Town	The GenQuip Stadium, Port Talbot
19:45	Greaves 7'; Hartland 76'; Walters 86'	Report	Williams 90'	Attendance: 122; Referee: Whitby

15 February 2012	Newtown	2–1 (3–2 agg.)	Prestatyn Town	Latham Park, Newtown
19:30	Rushton 65'; Boundford 88'	Report	Stephens 29'	Attendance: 125; Referee: Markham-Jones

Source: welsh-premier.com

== Second round ==
=== First leg ===
14 February 2012	The New Saints	2–1	Airbus UK Broughton	Park Hall, Oswestry
19:45	Seargeant 28'; Baker 85'	Report	Danks 59'	Attendance: 202; Referee: Petch

15 February 2012	Llanelli	0–0	Neath	Stebonheath Park, Llanelli
19:30		Report		Attendance: 134; Referee: James

21 February 2012	Port Talbot Town	0–2	Afan Lido	The GenQuip Stadium, Port Talbot
19:30		Report	D.Thomas 40'; James 47'	Attendance: 135; Referee: Morgan

25 February 2012	Bangor City	1–1	Newtown	Nantporth, Bangor
13:30	Brewerton 31'	Report	Rushton 75'	Attendance: 355; Referee: Jones

Source: welsh-premier.com

=== Second leg ===
28 February 2012	Afan Lido	0–0 (2–0 agg.)	Port Talbot Town	Marston Stadium, Aberavon
19:30		Report		Attendance: 145; Referee: Stephens

28 February 2012	Airbus UK Broughton	0–1 (1–3 agg.)	The New Saints	The Airfield, Broughton
19:30		Report	Finley 13'	Attendance: 238; Referee: Pratt

28 February 2012	Neath	4–2 (4–2 agg.)	Llanelli	The Gnoll, Neath
19:30	Bowen 1', 39'; K.Edwards 21'; Collins 70'; Hillier (red card) 84'	Report	Venables 80'; Griffiths 88'	Attendance: 269; Referee: Harrington

28 February 2012	Newtown	5–1 (6–2 agg.)	Bangor City	Latham Park, Newtown
19:30	Jones 3'; Boundford 35', 78'; Wright 37'; Rushton 52'	Report	Bull 45'	Attendance: 153; Referee: John

Source: welsh-premier.com

== Semifinals ==
=== First leg ===
20 March 2012
19:30

Neath	0–1	Afan Lido
	Report	Evans 4'

The Gnoll, Neath
Attendance: 254
Referee: Dean John (Swansea)
20 March 2012
19:45

The New Saints	3–2	Newtown
Seargeant 18'; Darlington 45', 89'	Report	Rushton 65'; Partridge 67'

Park Hall, Oswestry
Attendance: 208
Referee: Kevin Parry (Llanfairpwll)

=== Second leg ===
31 March 2012
14:30

Afan Lido	2–1	Neath
Thomas 49'; Payne 51'	Report	31' Hughes

Marston Stadium, Aberavon
Attendance: 431
Referee: Bryn Markham-Jones (Wrexham)
3 April 2012
19:30

Newtown	1–0	The New Saints
Boundford 85'	Report

Latham Park, Newtown
Attendance: 226
Referee: Mark Whitby (Penllergaer)

== Final ==
28 April 2012
15:10

Afan Lido	1–1 (a.e.t.)	Newtown
Jones 42'	Report	Rushton 90'
Penalties
	3–2

Park Avenue, Aberystwyth
Attendance: 301
Referee: Kevin Morgan (Cardiff)
