= 2010–11 Welsh League Cup =

Loosemores League Cup

Tournament details
- Country: Wales; England

Final positions
- Champions: The New Saints
- Runners-up: Llanelli

The 2010–11 Welsh League Cup is the 19th season of the Welsh League Cup, which was established in 1992. The cup culminated with the Final between Llanelli A.F.C. and The New Saints F.C. which The New Saints won 4–3 after extra time.

== First round ==
=== First leg ===
August 30, 2010	Airbus UK Broughton	4–2	Newtown	The Airfield; Broughton
19:30	Dorman 1'; Allen 13'; Rushton 26', 58'	Report	Davies 47' (pen.); Hutchinson 53'	Attendance: 130; Referee: Nick Pratt

August 30, 2010	Bala Town	2–2	Prestatyn Town	Maes Tegid; Bala
19:30	Macauley 29'; Evans 69'	Report	Hunt 40', 45'	Attendance: 214; Referee: Bryn Markham-Jones

August 30, 2010	Carmarthen Town	0–0	Aberystwyth Town	Richmond Park; Carmarthen
19:30		Report		Attendance: 235; Referee: Paul Thomas

August 30, 2010	Haverfordwest County	2–1	Neath	Bridge Meadow Stadium; Haverfordwest
19:30	Hudgell 15'; Thomas 71'	Report	Bond 8'	Attendance: 201; Referee: Paul Fisher

Source: welsh-premier.com

=== Second leg ===
September 7, 2010	Aberystwyth Town	3–0 (3–0 agg.)	Carmarthen Town	Park Avenue; Aberystwyth
19:30	Codling 4', 59'; Sherbon 26'	Report		Attendance: 209; Referee: Dean John

September 7, 2010	Prestatyn Town	2–0 (4–2 agg.)	Bala Town	Bastion Road; Prestatyn
19:30	Stephens 4', 59'; Hunt 35' (pen.)	Report		Attendance: 117; Referee: Lee Evans

September 8, 2010	Neath	2–2 (3–4 agg.)	Haverfordwest County	The Gnoll; Neath
19:30	Cochlin 7'; Hill 79'	Report	Christopher 18', 48'	Attendance: 201; Referee: Darren Aide

September 8, 2010	Newtown	1–0 (3–4 agg.)	Airbus UK Broughton	Latham Park; Newtown
19:30	Hartland 34'	Report		Attendance: 201; Referee: Brian James

Source: welsh-premier.com

== Second round ==
=== First leg ===
September 21, 2010	Haverfordwest County	1–1	Aberystwyth Town	Park Avenue; Aberystwyth
19:30		Report		Attendance: 209; Referee: Dean John

September 21, 2010	Llanelli	1–2	Port Talbot Town	Bastion Road; Prestatyn
19:30		Report		Attendance: 117; Referee: Lee Evans

September 21, 2010	The New Saints	2–0	Airbus UK Broughton	The Gnoll; Neath
19:30		Report		Attendance: 201; Referee: Darren Aide

September 21, 2010	Prestatyn Town	3–2	Bangor City	Latham Park; Newtown
19:30		Report		Attendance: 201; Referee: Brian James

Source: welsh-premier.com

=== Second leg ===
October 5, 2010	Aberystwyth Town	3–0 (4–1 agg.)	Haverfordwest County	Park Avenue; Aberystwyth
19:30		Report		Attendance: 209; Referee: Dean John

October 5, 2010	Bangor City	2–1 (4–4 agg.)	Prestatyn Town	The Gnoll; Neath
19:30		Report		Attendance: 201; Referee: Darren Aide

October 5, 2010	Port Talbot Town	0–2 (2–3 agg.)	Llanelli	Latham Park; Newtown
19:30		Report		Attendance: 201; Referee: Brian James

October 6, 2010	Airbus UK Broughton	2–2 (2–4 agg.)	The New Saints	Bastion Road; Prestatyn
19:30		Report		Attendance: 117; Referee: Lee Evans

Source: welsh-premier.com

== Semi finals ==
=== First leg ===
26 October 2010
19:30

Aberystwyth Town	0–1	Llanelli AFC

Park Avenue, Aberystwyth

26 October 2010
19:30

The New Saints	9–0	Bangor City

Park Hall, Oswestry

=== Second leg ===
9 November 2010
19:30

Bangor City	1–3	The New Saints

Farrar Road Stadium, Bangor

The New Saints won 12–1 on aggregate.

9 November 2010
19:30

Llanelli AFC	3–1	Aberystwyth Town

Stebonheath Park, Llanelli

Llanelli won 4–1 in aggregate.

== Final ==
2 May 2011
14:30

Llanelli AFC	3–4 (a.e.t.)	The New Saints
Holloway 78'; Follows 86'; Moses 87'		43' Edwards; 75', 89' Sharp; 120' Ruscoe

Park Avenue, Aberystwyth
Attendance: 310
