= 2009–10 Welsh League Cup =

2009–2010 Welsh League Cup
Loosemores League Cup

Tournament details
- Country: Wales; England
- Teams: 18

Final positions
- Champions: The New Saints (3rd title)
- Runners-up: Rhyl

The 2009–10 Welsh League Cup was the 18th season of the Welsh League Cup, which was established in 1992. Defending champions The New Saints beat Rhyl in the final to win the competition for the third time.

== Round and draw dates ==
Date	Event
18 August 2009	Group stage, round 1
25 August 2009	Group stage, round 2
1 September 2009	Group stage, round 3
8–9 September 2009	Group stage, round 4
15–23 September 2009	Group stage, round 5
6 October 2009	Group stage, round 6
October 2009	Quarter-finals
November 2009	Semi-finals, first leg
December 2009	Semi-finals, second leg
April 2010	Final

== Group stage ==
Key to colours in group tables
Teams progressed to the quarter finals
Best runner-up that progressed to the quarter finals

=== Group 1 ===
Team	Pld	W	D	L	GF	GA	GD	Pts
Port Talbot Town	4	3	1	0	8	3	+5	10
Neath Athletic	4	1	1	2	4	8	−4	4
Carmarthen Town	4	0	2	2	3	5	−2	2

	CAR	NEA	PTT
Carmarthen Town	–	2–3	0–1
Neath Athletic	0–0	–	1–4
Port Talbot Town	1–1	2–1	–

=== Group 2 ===
Team	Pld	W	D	L	GF	GA	GD	Pts
Llanelli	4	2	2	0	13	4	+9	8
Aberystwyth Town	4	1	2	1	5	11	−6	5
Haverfordwest County	4	0	2	2	2	5	−3	2

	ABER	HFW	LLA
Aberystwyth Town	–	0–0	2–2
Haverfordwest County	1–2	–	1–1
Llanelli	8–1	2–3	–

=== Group 3 ===
Team	Pld	W	D	L	GF	GA	GD	Pts
Porthmadog	4	2	0	2	9	4	+5	7
Gap Connah's Quay	4	2	1	1	6	7	−1	7
Caersws	4	0	2	2	2	6	−4	2

	CSWS	GCQ	POR
Caersws	–	0–0	1–1
Gap Connah's Quay	3–1	–	3–2
Porthmadog	2–0	4–0	–

=== Group 4 ===
Team	Pld	W	D	L	GF	GA	GD	Pts
Rhyl	4	4	0	0	11	2	+9	12
Prestatyn Town	4	1	1	2	5	7	−2	4
Airbus UK Broughton	4	0	1	3	3	10	−7	1

	AIR	PRE	RYL
Airbus UK	–	0–2	1–2
Prestatyn Town	2–2	–	0–3
Rhyl FC	4–0	2–1	–

=== Group 5 ===
Team	Pld	W	D	L	GF	GA	GD	Pts
Technogroup Welshpool Town	4	3	1	0	11	6	+7	10
Bala Town	4	2	1	1	7	3	+4	7
Elements Cefn Druids	4	0	0	4	5	15	−10	0

	BAL	ECD	TWT
Bala Town	–	2–1	1–2
Elements Cefn Druids	0–4	–	2–4
Technogroup Welshpool Town	0–0	5–2	–

=== Group 6 ===
Team	Pld	W	D	L	GF	GA	GD	Pts
The New Saints	4	3	1	0	13	6	+7	10
Bangor City	4	2	0	2	7	8	−1	6
Newtown	4	0	1	3	5	11	−6	1

	BAN	NEW	TNS
Bangor City	–	3–0	0–2
Newtown	1–2	–	2–4
The New Saints	5–2	2–2	–

== Knockout stage ==
=== Quarter-finals ===
27 October 2009
19:30

Bala Town	2–3	Gap Connah's Quay
Jefferies 15'; Griffits 87'	Report	Glover 30'; Hayes 90'; McNutt 93+3'

Maes Tegid, Bala
Attendance: 182
Referee: D Aide

27 October 2009
19:30

Porthmadog	1–4	Rhyl
D Williams 84'	Report	Connolly 17', 66'; M Williams 55', 87'

Y Traeth, Rhyl
Attendance: 247
Referee: K Parry

27 October 2009
19:30

Port Talbot Town	3–1	Technogroup Welshpool Town
Fahiya 9'; Rose 38'; McCreesh 64'	Report	Peate 64'

Victoria Road, Port Talbot
Attendance: 159
Referee: N Morgan

27 October 2009
19:45

The New Saints	4–1	Llanelli
Evans 36'; McKenna 41', 43'; Ruscoe 63' (pen.)	Report	Griffiths 4'

Park Hall, Oswestry
Attendance: 232
Referee: D John

=== First leg ===
10 November 2009
19:30

Gap Connah's Quay	2–1	Rhyl
Jones 17'; Harbert 31' (pen.)	Report	Connolly 55'

Deeside Stadium, Connah's Quay
Attendance: 252

10 November 2009
19:30

Port Talbot Town	0–0	The New Saints
	Report

The GenQuip Stadium, Port Talbot
Attendance: 166

=== Second leg ===
17 November 2009
19:30

Rhyl	4–0	Gap Connah's Quay
Connolly 8'; Hunt 40'; Smith 88', 90'	Report

Belle Vue, Rhyl
Attendance: 253

17 November 2009
19:45

The New Saints	2–0	Port Talbot Town
Hogan 22'; Ruscoe 30' (pen.)	Report

Park Hall, Oswestry
Attendance: 248

== Final ==
27 April 2010
19:30

Rhyl	1–3	The New Saints
Tuner 65'	Report	Sargent 31', 77'; Wood 36'

The Airfield
Attendance: 375
Referee: Paul Thomas (Wales)

== See also ==
- Welsh League Cup
- Welsh Premier League
- Welsh Cup
