= 2005–06 Welsh League Cup =

Loosemores League Cup

Tournament details
- Country: Wales
- Teams: 18

Final positions
- Champions: Total Network Solutions
- Runners-up: Port Talbot Town

Tournament statistics
- Matches played: 19
- Goals scored: 66 (3.47 per match)
- All statistics correct as of 02:00, 31 August 2009 (UTC).

The 2005–06 Welsh League Cup season was won by Total Network Solutions, beating Port Talbot Town in the final. It was the second victory for Total Network Solutions in the competition, and the first appearance by Port Talbot Town in the final. The final took place at Park Avenue, in Aberystwyth, Wales. The match was refereed by Ray Ellingham.

== Round and draw dates ==
Date	Event
13 August 2005	Preliminary Round
20 August – 13 September 2005	First Round
20 September – 5 October 2005	Second Round
15–23 November 2005	Semi-finals, first leg
7–20 December 2005	Semi-finals, second leg
30 April 2006	Final in Park Avenue, Aberystwyth

== Knockout stage ==
=== Preliminary round ===
Team 1	Score	Team 2
Cardiff Grange Quins	1–0	Caernarfon Town
NEWI Cefn Druids	2–5 (aet)	Airbus UK

=== First round ===
Team 1	Score	Team 2
Bangor City	2–4	Rhyl FC
Connah's Quay Nomads	0–3	Newtown AFC
Cwmbran Town	1–0	Haverfordwest County
Cardiff Grange Quins	3–1	Caersws FC
Llanelli AFC	3–0	Aberystwyth Town
Porthmadog FC	2–3	Airbus UK
Port Talbot Town	1–0	Carmarthen Town
Welshpool Town	0–2	Total Network Solutions

=== Second round ===
Team 1	Score	Team 2
Airbus UK	3–2	Rhyl FC
Llanelli AFC	5–2	Cardiff Grange Quins
Port Talbot Town	2–1	Cwmbran Town
Total Network Solutions	6–1	Newtown AFC

=== Semi-finals ===
Team 1	Agg.	Team 2	1st leg	2nd leg
Airbus UK	1–4	Total Network Solutions	1–2	0–2
Port Talbot Town	1–1 (aet); 7–6 (pens)	Llanelli AFC	0–1	1–0

=== Final ===
30 April 2006
14:30 (UTC+0)

Port Talbot Town	0–4	Total Network Solutions
	Report	Nicky Ward 7', Michael Wilde 16', 61', 84',

Park Avenue, Aberystwyth
Attendance: 358
Referee: Ray Ellingham (Wales)

Welsh League Cup
2005–06 Winners

Total Network Solutions
Second Title

== See also ==
- Welsh League Cup
- Welsh Premier League
- Welsh Cup
