= 2024–25 Welsh League Cup =

Nathaniel MG Cup

Tournament details
- Country: Wales
- Dates: 19 July 2024 - 28 February 2025
- Teams: 48

Final positions
- Champions: The New Saints
- Runners-up: Aberystwyth Town

The 2024–25 Welsh League Cup (known for sponsorship purposes as The Nathaniel MG Cup) is the 33rd season of the Welsh League Cup competition, which was established in 1992. The reigning champions The New Saints, retained the cup, beating Aberystwyth Town 1–0 in the final.

== Format ==
- 44 clubs in the Cymru Premier, Cymru North and Cymru South leagues entered the season's League Cup.
- Cardiff City, Merthyr Town, Newport County and Swansea City also competed as wildcard entries.
- All Cymru Premier sides received a bye into the second round, alongside second tier sides Ammanford, Colwyn Bay, Llanelli Town and Pontypridd United.

== First round ==
The draws for the first and second rounds were made on 19 June 2024.

=== Northern ===
Home team	Score	Away team
19 July 2024
Llay Welfare	3–1	Denbigh Town
Flint Mountain	0–3	Gresford Athletic
Ruthin Town	2–1	Bangor 1876
20 July 2024
Penrhyncoch	0–3	Guilsfield
Caersws	0–1	Holywell Town
Buckley Town	5–1	Prestatyn Town
Llandudno	3–0	Newport County
21 July 2024
Airbus UK Broughton	3–2	Mold Alexandra

=== Southern ===
Home team	Score	Away team
19 July 2024
Taff's Well	1–3	Merthyr Town
Afan Lido	1–3	Cardiff City
20 July 2024
Cwmbran Celtic	2–3	Trethomas Bluebirds
Caerau (Ely)	2–1	Trefelin
Penrhiwceiber Rangers	1–4	Goytre United
Carmarthen Town	2–1	Cambrian United
Llantwit Major	2–0	Newport City
21 July 2024
Baglan Dragons	1–1 (5–3 p)	Swansea City

== Second round ==
=== Northern ===
Home team	Score	Away team
Buckley Town	0–3	Connah's Quay Nomads
The New Saints	5–1	Flint Town United
Llandudno	2–2 (4–2 p)	Guilsfield
Gresford Athletic	1–4	Airbus UK Broughton
Ruthin Town	0–1	Bala Town
Colwyn Bay	0–2	Aberystwyth Town
Newtown	2–2 (1–3 p)	Caernarfon Town
Holywell Town	3–1	Llay Welfare

=== Southern ===
Home team	Score	Away team
Briton Ferry Llansawel	0–3	Penybont
Cardiff City	3–1	Pontypridd United
Trethomas Bluebirds	3–1	Baglan Dragons
Carmarthen Town	0–5	Haverfordwest County
Merthyr Town	2–0	Ammanford
Goytre United	3–2	Caerau (Ely)
Llantwit Major	2–3	Cardiff Metropolitan University
Barry Town United	1–1 (5–3 p)	Llanelli Town

== Third round ==
=== Northern ===
17 September 2024	Connah's Quay Nomads	3–2	Caernarfon Town
19:45

17 September 2024	Airbus UK Broughton	0–1	The New Saints
19:45

17 September 2024	Bala Town	2–0	Holywell Town
19:45

17 September 2024	Aberystwyth Town	3–2	Llandudno
20:00

=== Southern ===
17 September 2024	Cardiff City	2–1	Merthyr Town
19:30

17 September 2024	Cardiff Metropolitan University	9–1	Goytre United
19:45

17 September 2024	Penybont	1–0	Haverfordwest County
19:45

17 September 2024	Trethomas Bluebirds	1–4	Barry Town United
19:45

== Quarter-finals ==
=== Northern ===
22 October 2024	Connah's Quay Nomads	1–2	Aberystwyth Town	Flint
19:45				Stadium: Essity Stadium

13 November 2024	The New Saints	3–1	Bala Town
19:45

=== Southern ===
21 October 2024	Cardiff City	3–2	Cardiff Met University	Cardiff, Wales
19:45		Report		Stadium: Cardiff International Sports Stadium; Attendance: 300

22 October 2024	Barry Town United	3–2	Penybont	Jenner Park, Barry
19:45

== Semi-finals ==
30 November 2024	Aberystwyth Town (1)	1–1 (4–1 p)	Cardiff City	Aberystwyth, Wales
14:30				Stadium: Park Avenue, Aberystwyth

1 December 2024	Barry Town United (1)	1–2	The New Saints (1)	Barry
14:00				Stadium: Jenner Park

== Final ==
28 February 2025	Aberystwyth Town (1)	0–1	The New Saints (1)	Newtown
19:45				Stadium: Latham Park
