= 2006–07 Welsh League Cup =

Loosemores League Cup

Tournament details
- Country: Wales
- Teams: 17

Final positions
- Champions: Caersws FC
- Runners-up: Rhyl FC

Tournament statistics
- Matches played: 65
- Goals scored: 260 (4 per match)
- All statistics correct as of 22:00, 30 August 2009 (UTC).

The 2006–07 Welsh League Cup season was won by Caersws FC, beating Rhyl FC in the final. It was the third victory for Caersws FC in the competition, and the fourth appearance by Rhyl FC in the final. The final took place at Park Avenue, in Aberystwyth, Wales. The match was refereed by Brian Lawlor.

== Round and draw dates ==
Date	Event
22 August 2006	Group stage, round 1
22 August 2006	Group stage, round 2
13 September 2006	Group stage, round 3
26 September 2006	Group stage, round 4
3 October 2006	Group stage, round 5
17 October 2006	Group stage, round 6
7–14 November 2006	Quarter-finals
28 November 2006	Semi-finals, first leg
5–19 December 2006	Semi-finals, second leg
18 March 2007	Final in Park Avenue, Aberystwyth

== Group stage ==
Key to colours in group tables
Teams progressed to the quarter-finals
Runner-up that progressed to the quarter-finals

=== Group A ===
Team	Pld	W	D	L	GF	GA	GD	Pts
Rhyl FC	6	4	1	1	13	4	+9	13
CPD Porthmadog	6	2	2	2	8	7	1	8
Bangor City	6	2	1	3	11	16	−5	7
Caernarfon Town	6	2	0	4	10	15	−5	6

	BAN	CAER	POR	RHY
Bangor City	–	3–1	2–2	1–4
Caernarfon Town	4–3	–	1–2	2–1
CPD Porthmadog	1–2	3–1	–	0–0
Rhyl FC	4–0	3–1	1–0	–

=== Group B ===
Team	Pld	W	D	L	GF	GA	GD	Pts
The New Saints	6	5	0	1	32	7	+25	15
Connah's Quay Nomads	6	5	0	1	22	9	+13	15
NEWI Cefn Druids	6	2	0	4	7	14	−7	6
Airbus UK Broughton	6	0	0	6	6	33	−27	0

	AIR	CQN	NCD	TNS
Airbus UK Broughton	–	1–6	2–3	1–3
Connah's Quay Nomads	7–2	–	3–0	2–1
NEWI Cefn Druids	3–0	0–1	–	1–5
The New Saints	11–0	5–3	3–0	–

=== Group C ===
Team	Pld	W	D	L	GF	GA	GD	Pts
Caersws FC	6	3	1	2	11	9	+2	10
Aberystwyth Town	6	3	1	2	8	7	+1	10
Welshpool Town	6	2	2	2	7	6	+1	8
Newtown AFC	6	2	0	4	9	13	−4	6

	ABER	CAER	NEW	WEL
Aberystwyth Town	–	3–1	2–1	0–0
Caersws FC	3–0	–	4–3	1–1
Newtown AFC	0–2	2–1	–	2–1
Welshpool Town	2–1	0–1	3–1	–

=== Group D ===
Team	Pld	W	D	L	GF	GA	GD	Pts
Llanelli FC	8	8	0	0	29	10	+19	24
Carmarthen Town	8	5	1	2	21	13	+8	16
Port Talbot Town	8	2	1	5	15	22	−7	7
Haverfordwest County	8	2	1	5	12	22	−10	7
Cwmbran Town	8	1	1	6	13	23	−10	4

	CARM	CWMB	HFWC	LLAN	PTT
Carmarthen Town	–	4–0	3–1	0–4	4–2
Cwmbran Town	0–3	–	7–2	0–3	3–3
Haverfordwest County	0–0	2–1	–	2–3	2–0
Llanelli FC	4–3	3–1	5–2	–	3–1
Port Talbot Town	2–4	3–1	3–1	1–4	–

== Knockout stage ==
=== Quarter-finals ===
Team 1	Score	Team 2
Caersws FC	2–1	Carmarthen Town
Rhyl FC	2–0	Connah's Quay Nomads
The New Saints	1–2	CPD Porthmadog
Llanelli FC	1–2	Aberystwyth Town

=== Semi-finals ===
Team 1	Agg.	Team 2	1st leg	2nd leg
Aberystwyth Town	4–5	Caersws FC	1–2	3–3
CPD Porthmadog	0–4	Rhyl FC	0–0	0–4

=== Final ===
18 March 2007
15:00 (UTC+0)

Caersws FC	1–1 (a.e.t.)	Rhyl FC
Graham Evans 98'	Report	Dave Cameron 106'
Penalties
	3–1

Park Avenue, Aberystwyth
Attendance: 400
Referee: Brian Lawlor (Wales)

Welsh League Cup
2006–07 Winners

Caersws FC
Third Title

== See also ==
- Welsh League Cup
- Welsh Premier League
- Welsh Cup
