= List of Bala Town FC seasons =

== Seasons ==
Season	League										Welsh Cup	Welsh League Cup	Europe	Other
Season	Tier	Division	P	W	D	L	F	A	Pts	Pos	Welsh Cup	Welsh League Cup	Europe	Other
1969-70		Welsh National League (Wrexham Area) Division One												
1970-71		Welsh National League (Wrexham Area) Division One												
1971-72		Welsh National League (Wrexham Area) Division One												
1972-73		Welsh National League (Wrexham Area) Division One												
1974-75		Welsh National League (Wrexham Area) Division One												
1975-76		Welsh National League (Wrexham Area) Division One												
1976-77		Welsh National League (Wrexham Area) Division One												
1977-78		Welsh National League (Wrexham Area) Division One												
1978-79		Welsh National League (Wrexham Area) Division One												
1979-80		Welsh National League (Wrexham Area) Division One	26	4	6	16	19	58	14	14				
1980-81		Welsh National League (Wrexham Area) Division One	30	8	6	16	43	56	22	13				
1981-82		Welsh National League (Wrexham Area) Division One	30	12	4	14	56	58	28	8				
1982-83		Welsh National League (Wrexham Area) Division One	30	10	9	11	56	58	29	9				
1983-84		Welsh National League (Wrexham Area) Division One	28	8	4	16	56	80	20	12				
1984-85		Welsh National League (Wrexham Area) Premier Division	30	13	3	14	53	58	29	10				
1985-86		Welsh National League (Wrexham Area) Premier Division	30	2	8	20	25	71	12	15				
1986-87		Welsh National League (Wrexham Area) Premier Division	28	16	4	8	39	36	52	5				
1987-88		Welsh National League (Wrexham Area) Premier Division	30	3	3	24	16	94	12	15				
1988-89		Welsh National League (Wrexham Area) Division One	26	11	6	9	49	58	39	7				
1989-90		Welsh National League (Wrexham Area) Division One	26	18	5	3	66	30	59	1				
1990-91		Welsh National League (Wrexham Area) Premier Division	26	2	7	17	23	64	13	14				
1991-92		Welsh National League (Wrexham Area) Division One	34	11	10	13	58	65	43	11				
1992-93	5	Welsh National League (Wrexham Area) Division Two	30	11	11	8	64	55	44	7				
1993-94	5	Welsh National League (Wrexham Area) Division Two	24	9	1	14	52	68	28	7				
1994-95	5	Welsh National League (Wrexham Area) Division Two	26	17	3	6	89	52	54	3				
1995-96	4	Welsh National League (Wrexham Area) Division One	26	12	4	10	57	59	40	8				
1996-97	4	Welsh National League (Wrexham Area) Division One	18	7	6	5	30	28	27	5				
1997-98	4	Welsh National League (Wrexham Area) Division One	22	15	2	5	69	29	47	1				
1998-99	3	Welsh National League (Wrexham Area) Premier Division	28	9	4	15	34	59	31	10				
1999-2000	3	Welsh National League (Wrexham Area) Premier Division	30	8	6	16	38	70	30	14				
2000-01	3	Welsh National League (Wrexham Area) Premier Division	30	17	3	10	63	50	54	5				
2001-02	3	Welsh National League (Wrexham Area) Premier Division	28	4	7	17	33	61	19	14				
2002-03	3	Welsh National League (Wrexham Area) Premier Division	30	10	4	16	43	66	31*	10				
2003-04	3	Welsh National League (Wrexham Area) Premier Division	26	18	4	4	70	25	58	1				NEWFA Cup Winners
2004-05	2	Cymru Alliance	34	18	6	10	60	41	60	4	QF			Cymru Alliance League Cup Winners
2004-05	2	Cymru Alliance	34	18	6	10	60	41	60	4	QF			NEWFA Cup Runner Up
2005-06	2	Cymru Alliance	34	14	9	11	63	52	51	7				Cymru Alliance League Cup Runner Up
2006-07	2	Cymru Alliance	34	21	7	6	80	31	70	2				NEWFA Cup Winners
2007-08	2	Cymru Alliance	32	19	4	9	71	42	61	2				NEWFA Cup Winners
2007-08	2	Cymru Alliance	32	19	4	9	71	42	61	2				Welsh National League Division One League Cup
2008-09	2	Cymru Alliance	32	23	6	3	81	23	75	1				Cymru Alliance League Cup Winners
2009-10	1	Welsh Premier League	34	12	9	13	39	47	45	11	SF	QF		
2010-11	1	Welsh Premier League	32	10	3	19	41	57	33	11		1R		
2011-12	1	Welsh Premier League	32	14	7	11	48	41	49	5	SF	1R		
2012-13	1	Welsh Premier League	32	17	5	10	62	41	56	7		3R		
2013-14	1	Welsh Premier League	32	13	6	13	61	45	45	8	SF	RU	UEFA Europa League 1QR	
2014-15	1	Welsh Premier League	32	18	5	9	67	42	59	2		RU		
2015-16	1	Welsh Premier League	32	15	12	5	48	27	57	2	QF	2R	UEFA Europa League 1QR	
2016-17	1	Welsh Premier League	32	16	9	7	61	46	57	3	Winners	2R	UEFA Europa League 1QR	
2017-18	1	Welsh Premier League	32	15	4	13	37	48	49	4	3R	1R	UEFA Europa League 1QR	
2018-19	1	Welsh Premier League	32	13	5	14	55	63	44	6	QF	QF	UEFA Europa League PR	
2019-20	1	Cymru Premier	26	15	4	7	53	23	49	3	3R	SF		
2020-21	1	Cymru Premier	32	18	6	8	67	42	60	3			UEFA Europa League 2QR	
2021-22	1	Cymru Premier	32	16	11	5	67	37	59	2	SF	SF	UEFA Europa Conference League 1QR	
2022-23	1	Cymru Premier	32	12	8	12	51	37	44	5	RU	Winners	UEFA Europa Conference League 1QR	
2023-24	1	Cymru Premier	32	13	12	7	38	31	51	3	SF	3R		
2024-25	1	Cymru Premier	32	8	13	11	38	43	46	6	4R	QF	UEFA Conference League 1QR	

== Key ==
Champions	Runners-up	Promoted	Relegated	* = Points Deduction
