= Welsh Tier Two League Cup =

- Founded: 2022
- Region: Wales
- Teams: 32
- Current champions: Airbus UK Broughton (2025–26)

The Welsh Tier Two League Cup is a football cup competition in Wales. It is played between the teams of the Cymru North and the Cymru South; both leagues are at the second tier of the Welsh football league system. The cup was founded in 2022 and is known as the Welsh Blood Service League Cup for sponsorship reasons.

Until 2025 it had teams competing in a regionalised draw up to and including the "regional finals", then a national final between the two regional winners. For 2025–26 it was changed so that the "regional finals" are removed and replaced by unregionalised semi-finals, with the national final then becoming the only final in the competition.

It will not be played in 2026–27, due to the expansion of the Cymru Premier leading to an increased number of fixtures for each team.

== Previous winners ==
- 2022–23: Barry Town United
- 2023–24: Mold Alexandra
- 2024–25: Airbus UK Broughton
- 2025–26: Airbus UK Broughton
- 2026–27: Not played due to expansion of Cymru Premier
