= Brandon Diau =

Congolese footballer

Personal information
- Full name: Berti Brandon Diau
- Date of birth: 2 June 1993 (age 33)
- Place of birth: Bonn, Germany
- Height: 6 ft 6 in (1.98 m)
- Position: Defender

Team information
- Current team: Airbus UK Broughton
- Number: 12

Youth career
- –2008: Bayer Leverkusen
- 2008–2009: SF Troisdorf
- 2009–2011: Hamburger SV

Senior career*
Years	Team	Apps	(Gls)
2012–2013	Hamburger SV	0	(0)
2013–2014	Hilal Bergheim		
2014	TSC Euskirchen		
2014–2015	Hapoel Afula		
2015–2016	SVN Zweibrücken		
2016	Billericay Town	4	(1)
2017	Burgess Hill	2	(0)
2018–2019	Tunbridge Wells		
2019	Truro City	4	(0)
2019	Great Wakering Rovers	3	(1)
2019–2020	Kidderminster Harriers	8	(0)
2020–2021	Pandurii	14	(0)
2021–2022	Víkingur Ólafsvík	9	(0)
2022–2023	Flint Town United	34	(2)
2023–2024	Colwyn Bay	7	(1)
2024	Portadown	38	(1)
2024–2025	Institute	6	(0)
2025	Lokomotíva Košice	7	(2)
2026–	Airbus UK Broughton	8	(0)

International career
	Congo U17	2	(0)
	Congo U20	2	(0)
- * Club domestic league appearances and goals as of 07:59, 8 November 2026 (UTC)~

Berti Brandon Diau (born 2 June 1993) is a German-born Congolese footballer who plays for Airbus UK Broughton

== Personal life ==
Berti Brandon Diau was born in Bonn, North Rhine-Westphalia, Germany, on 2 June 1993, to parents of Congolese descent.

== Career ==
Diau was part of the Bayer Leverkusen academy before being released in 2008. He spent the 2008–09 season with SF Troisdorf before joining Hamburger SV, where he remained until 2013. Between 2013 and 2016, he had spells with Hilal Bergheim, TSC Euskirchen, Hapoel Afula and SVN Zweibrücken.

In 2016, he joined Isthmian League Premier Division side Billericay Town and later played for Burgess Hill Town, Tunbridge Wells, Truro City and Great Wakering Rovers between 2017 and 2019. He signed for Kidderminster Harriers in September 2019, before being loaned out to Redditch United in December of that year.

Between 2020 and 2021, Diau played for Romanian club Pandurii Târgu Jiu and Icelandic side Víkingur Ólafsvík. He returned to the United Kingdom in July 2022, signing for Flint Town United. He left the club at the end of the season. He went on trial at Scottish side Greenock Morton, before ultimately joining Colwyn Bay in September 2023. On the 30th September 2023, during a game against Cardiff Met, he scored an own goal from near his own half-way line.

In January 2024, he moved to NIFL Championship side Portadown, before signing for Institute the following season.

In September 2025, Diau signed for Slovak third tier side Lokomotíva Košice, scoring on his debut in a 2–1 win against Slovan Sabinov. The club's head coach, Martin Juhar confirmed on 4th January 2026 that "It is certain that Berti Brandon Diau will no longer continue in the club".

In July 2026, Airbus UK Broughton announced the signing of Diau until the end of the 2026–27 season. Diau made his club debut on 31st August 2026 against Holywell Town in the Cymru Premier in a 6-2 victory on 28 August.

== Honours ==
=== Portadown FC ===
- NIFL Championship: 2023–24
