= Andy Thomas (footballer, born 1977) =

English footballer and manager

Personal information
- Full name: Andrew Thomas
- Date of birth: 14 December 1977 (age 48)
- Place of birth: Chester, England
- Position: Defender

Youth career
- Wrexham

Senior career*
Years	Team	Apps	(Gls)
1995–1997	Wrexham	0	(0)
1997–1999	Connah's Quay Nomads	70	(3)
1999	Cwmbran Town	3	(1)
1999–2001	Connah's Quay Nomads	38	(0)
2001–2003	Newtown	51	(0)
2003–2007	Airbus UK	20	(1)
2005–2006	→ Halkyn United (dual registration)		

Managerial career
- 2007–2016: Airbus UK (assistant)
- 2016–2018: Airbus UK
- * Club domestic league appearances and goals as of 02:00, 3 January 2017 (UTC)

Andrew Thomas (born 14 December 1977) is an English football manager and former footballer.

== Career ==
=== Playing career ===
Thomas was born in Chester, and began his career as a trainee with Wrexham, playing in the 1995-96 UEFA Cup Winners' Cup against FC Petrolul Ploieşti. He turned professional in August 1996, but failed to make any further first team appearances and was released in 1997. He joined Connah's Quay Nomads and began a lengthy career in Welsh football. He moved to Cwmbran Town in the 1999–2000 season, but played just twice before returning to Connah's Quay. In 2001, he joined Newtown, moving to Airbus UK Broughton in August 2003. At the end of this first season with Airbus, they won the Cymru Alliance and with it promotion to the Welsh Premier League. He spent the 2005–06 season on a dual registration with both Airbus UK and Cymru Alliance side Halkyn United. He retired in 2007.

=== Coaching career ===
In November 2007, Thomas was appointed as assistant manager of Airbus UK. In August 2016, Thomas was appointed interim manager of Airbus UK before taking permanent charge in September 2016.

== Career statistics ==
=== Managerial record ===
As of 3 January 2017.

Managerial record by team and tenure
Team	Nat	From	To	Record					Ref
Team	Nat	From	To	P	W	D	L	Win %	Ref
Airbus UK Broughton	(Wales)	11 August 2016	2018	41	12	6	23	29.3	
Total				41	12	6	23	29.3	—

== Honours ==
=== Player ===
Airbus UK

- Cymru Alliance (1): 2003–04
