= 2020–21 Welsh League Cup =

Nathaniel MG Cup

Tournament details
- Country: Wales; England
- Dates: 11–12 December 2020
- Teams: 46

Tournament statistics
- Matches played: 14
- Goals scored: 36 (2.57 per match)
- Top goal scorer(s): Tom Berry; Damon Thomas (3 goals each)

The 2020–21 Welsh League Cup (known for sponsorship purposes as The Nathaniel MG Cup) was the 29th season of the Welsh League cup competition, which was established in 1992. The reigning champions were Connah's Quay Nomads. The competition was suspended in December 2020, before being cancelled in March 2021.

== Format ==
- 44 clubs in the JD Cymru Premier, JD Cymru North & JD Cymru South Leagues will enter the season's League Cup.
- Newport County and Cardiff City were afforded the two wildcard spots for the season.
- Due to Welsh Government Regulations, only clubs from Tiers 1 & 2 of the Welsh Domestic Pyramid were eligible to participate.
- In the first round, the wildcard entrants were both placed in the Southern section of the draw and joined 13 JD Cymru South teams, and Penrhyncoch from the JD Cymru North, whilst the Northern Section comprised twelve teams for JD Cymru North.
- The top two unpromoted teams from the Tier 2 leagues last season, the 2 relegated JD Cymru Premier Clubs and the 12 teams currently playing in Tier 1 will join the competition in the Second Round later in 2021.

== Access List ==
Round	Main date	Number of fixtures	Clubs	New Entries	Leagues entering at this round
First round North & South	12 December 2020	North: 6 South: 8	North: 12; South:16	28	North: 12 JD Cymru North teams South: 2 Wildcard teams 13 JD Cymru South clubs 1 JD Cymru North club (Penrhyncoch)
Second round	TBA	16	32	18	Top 2 unpromoted teams from the Tier 2 leagues last season 2 relegated JD Cymru Premier clubs last season 12 JD Cymru Premier clubs 2 JD Cymru North/South clubs
Third round	TBA	8	16	None	
Quarter-finals	TBA	4	8	None	
Semi-finals	TBA	2	4	None	
Final	TBA	1	2	None	

== First round ==
=== North ===
12 December 2020	Holyhead Hotspur	1–0	Llandudno	Holyhead
14:30	Corey Jones 4'			Stadium: The New Oval

12 December 2020	Buckley	2–2 (5–6 p)	Colwyn Bay	Buckley
14:30	Shaun Tinsley 84', 90+1'		Michael Williams 9'; Sion Edwards 44'	Stadium: Globe Way Stadium; Referee: David Wright
	Penalties
	Chris Roberts (penalty missed); Shaun Tinsley (penalty missed)		Jordan Carrington (penalty missed); Morgan Ashworth (penalty scored)

12 December 2020	Bangor City	3–0	Gresford	Bangor
14:30	Enzo Zicarelli 17'; Giacomo Mello 31', 50'			Stadium: Nantporth

12 December 2020	Llanrhaeadr	2–2 (3–4 p)	Llangefni Town	Llanrhaeadr-ym-Mochnant
13:30	Joe Vaughan 27'; Matthew Jones 69'		Kurt Williams 4'; Andy Sinclair 18'	Stadium: The Recreation Field
	Penalties
	Penalty scored Penalty missed		Penalty scored Penalty missed

11 December 2020	Holywell Town	P–P	Llanidloes Town	Holywell
19:00				Stadium: Halkyn Road

12 December 2020	Conwy Borough	0–2	Ruthin Town	Conwy
14:30			Jamie Cumming 23'; Joshua Jones 49'	Stadium: Y Morfa Stadium

=== South ===
11 December 2020	Newport County	P–P	Undy Athletic	Newport
19:00				Stadium: Rodney Parade

11 December 2020	Goytre United	P–P	Penrhyncoch	Goytre
19:00				Stadium: Glenhafod Park Stadium

12 December 2020	Pontypridd Town	2–0	Cwmbrân Celtic	Pontypridd
14:30	Aiden Lewis 12'; Luke Gullick 70'			Stadium: USW Sports Park

12 December 2020	Ammanford	0–6	Trefelin BGC	Ammanford
14:30			Ryan Griffiths; Damon Thomas; Steve Berry (pen.)	Stadium: Recreation Ground

12 December 2020	Risca United	5–2	Afan Lido	Risca
14:30	Tom Berry 8', 34', 59'; Lewis Hitchock 16' (pen.); Morgan Thomas 89' (o.g.)		Craig Reddy 33'; Ioan Clatworthy 54'	Stadium: Ty-Isaf Park

11 December 2020	Cardiff City	2–0	Taff's Well	Pontypridd
19:00	Kieron Evans 44'; Isaak Davies 79' (pen.)			Stadium: USW Sports Park

12 December 2020	Port Talbot Town	1–1 (2–4 p)	Cambrian & Clydach Vale	Port Talbot
14:30	Jordan Edwards 8'		Josh Bull 90+6'	Stadium: Victoria Road
	Penalties
	Connor Harris (penalty scored); Jordan Edwards (penalty missed); Jack Underwood (penalty scored); Morgan Thomas (penalty missed)		Liam Edwards (penalty scored); Dai Thomas (penalty missed); Jarred Wright (penalty scored); Cam Thomas (penalty scored); Josh Bull (penalty scored)

11 December 2020	Llanelli Town	1–2	Llantwit Major	Llanelli
19:00	Ricky Kerr 5'		Cullen Kinsella 43'; Josh Jones 50'	Stadium: Stebonheath Park

== Competition Cancelled ==
On 31 March 2021, The Football Association of Wales National Cup Board (NCB) decided to cancel the rest of the Nathaniel MG Cup competition for the 2020–21 season.

The decision to cancel the competition was made as the ongoing public health crisis made it impossible to make playing the rest of the competition viable.
