= Jamie Insall =

English football player

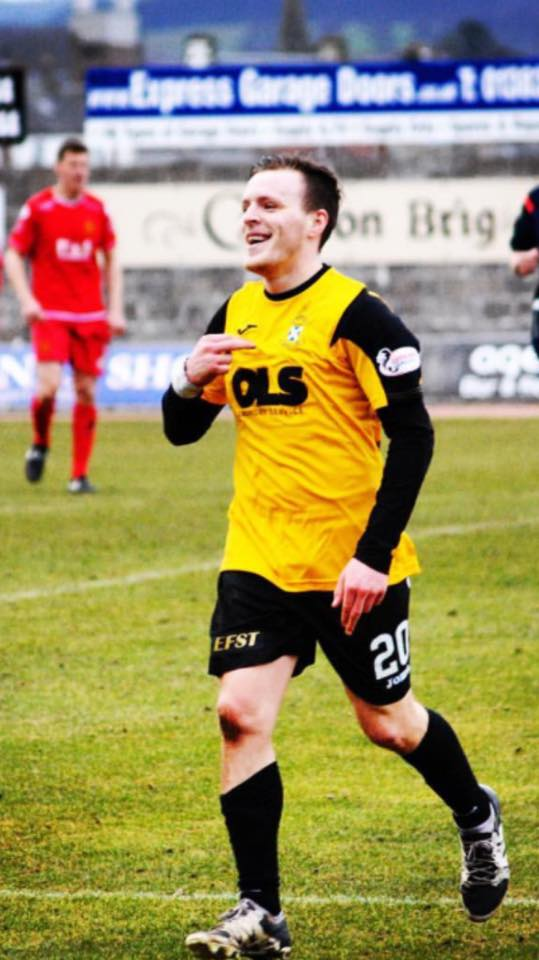
- Jamie Insall in action for Scottish club East Fife

Personal information
- Date of birth: 1 March 1992 (age 34)
- Place of birth: Worcester, England
- Height: 5 ft 8 in (1.73 m)
- Position: Forward

Team information
- Current team: Halesowen Town

Youth career
- 2008–2010: Kidderminster Harriers

Senior career*
Years	Team	Apps	(Gls)
2009	→ Stourport Swifts (loan)	15	(9)
2011–2012	Pershore Town	9	(16)
2012–2013	Littleton	22	(28)
2013–2014	Westfields	22	(16)
2014–2015	Worcester Raiders	14	(22)
2015	Bromyard Town	12	(20)
2015	Stourbridge	0	(0)
2015–2017	Hibernian	0	(0)
2015–2016	→ East Fife (loan)	15	(8)
2016–2017	→ East Fife (loan)	24	(7)
2019–2022	Connah's Quay Nomads	68	(18)
2022–2023	Halesowen Town	31	(11)
2023	Redditch United	3	(0)
2023–	Worcester City	29	(12)
- * Club domestic league appearances and goals as of 30 April 2024

Jamie Paul Insall (born 1 March 1992) is an English footballer who plays for Worcester City.

== Career ==
Born in Worcester, Insall's started out as a scholar at Kidderminster Harriers Stourport Swifts. Insall early senior playing career was spent at a number of other teams in the Midlands, including Pershore Town, Littleton and Worcester Raiders - all of which he held impressive goalscoring records at. Ahead of the 2015–16 season, Insall joined Stourbridge scoring six goals in five pre-season friendlies. This prompted Scottish side Hibernian to offer Insall a trial. During his trial, Insall scored one against Brentford in a reserve game and shortly after scored three goals against the Hibernian first team for the reserves - as a result, Insall signed for Hibernian on a three-year deal in early September 2015.

Insall made his Hibernian debut in a pre-season friendly against Birmingham City and was an unused substitute against Queen of the South. Shortly after, he was loaned to East Fife where he went on to score seven goals in 15 appearances, helping the side to win the Scottish League Two in the 2015–16 campaign. Insall returned to East Fife the following season, again on loan, where he scored a further 14 goals. Insall was named as the Scottish League One Player of the Month alongside then manager, Gary Naysmith.

In October 2017, it was announced that Insall had failed an in-competition doping test and was banned from all sport for two years after the test came back with a positive result for benzoylecgonine - a metabolite of cocaine.

As part of his attempts to keep fit and competitive during his ban, Insall took part in a bare-knuckle fight in February 2018.

Insall made his return to football at Cymru Premier team Connah's Quay Nomads as announced by the Welsh side on 1 April 2019, however Insall didn't make his debut for the team until 20 April due to International Clearance.

In October 2019, Insall was named as Cymru Premier Player of the Month, alongside manager Andy Morrison who won the Manager of the Month. Insall added another piece of silverware to his collection, scoring a volley in the final of the Nathaniel MG Cup as Connah's Quay Nomads defeated STM Sports in February 2020.

Insall then added the Cymru Premier title to his CV, as the season was brought to a premature end due to the Coronavirus pandemic, with Connah's Quay Nomads ending the season four points clear of previous champions, The New Saints. The league was determined on a Points-per-game average, which saw Insall's side lead the pack with an average of 2.15. He added a second winners medal the following season and left the club at the end of the 2021–22 season.

Insall was signed by Northern Premier League Midlands Division side Halesowen Town for the start of the 2022–23 season.
