= Joël Kitenge =

Luxembourgish international footballer (born 1987)

Personal information
- Full name: Joël Ngoy Kitenge
- Date of birth: 12 November 1987 (age 38)
- Place of birth: Kinshasa, Zaire
- Height: 1.75 m (5 ft 9 in)
- Position: Striker

Senior career*
Years	Team	Apps	(Gls)
2005–2007	CS Oberkorn		
2007	FC Villefranche	12	(1)
2007–2008	FC Lienden		
2008	FC Emmendingen	11	(2)
2008–2012	CS Fola Esch	93	(26)
2012–2014	F91 Dudelange	34	(10)
2014–2016	CS Grevenmacher	22	(2)
2016–2017	Jeunesse Useldange		
2017–2018	US Rumelange	9	(0)
2018–2021	Blo-Wäiss Itzig		
2021–2023	FC Schengen		
2023	CS Grevenmacher		

International career^{‡}
2005–2011	Luxembourg	29	(2)
- * Club domestic league appearances and goals as of 31 May 2025 (UTC) ‡ National team caps and goals as of 18:53, 28 March 2017 (UTC)

Joël Ngoy Kitenge (born 12 November 1987) is a retired Luxembourgish international footballer who played as a striker.

== Early and personal life ==
Kitenge was born in Kinshasa, Zaire.

== Club career ==
Kitenge has played club football in Luxembourg, France, the Netherlands and Germany for CS Oberkorn, FC Villefranche, FC Lienden, FC Emmendingen, CS Fola Esch, F91 Dudelange, CS Grevenmacher and Jeunesse Useldange.

== International career ==
Kitenge made his international debut for Luxembourg in 2005, earning 29 caps between then and 2011. He appeared for them in FIFA World Cup qualifying matches.
