= Jasmin Dutton =

Welsh footballer (born 1992)

Personal information
- Date of birth: 2 December 1992 (age 33)

Team information
- Current team: Llandudno

Youth career
- Rhyl Hearts
- 2000-?: Tranmere Rovers

College career
Years	Team	Apps	(Gls)
2011–2014	East Tennessee State Buccaneers	?	(3)

Senior career*
Years	Team	Apps	(Gls)
?–2011	Tranmere Rovers		
2011–2014	East Tennessee State Buccaneers		
2018–2019	Llandudno		
2019–2020	Connah's Quay Nomads		
2021–	Llandudno		

International career
2006–2007	Wales U17s	8	(0)
2007–2011	Wales U19s	22	(6)
2009–2011	Wales	8	(2)
- * Club domestic league appearances and goals

Jasmin Dutton (born 2 December 1992) is a Welsh footballer who plays for Llandudno Ladies F.C. She formerly played for Tranmere Rovers, East Tennessee State Buccaneers, Connah's Quay Nomads, and Wales.

== Early life ==
Dutton grew up in Kinmel Bay and attended Ysgol Emrys Ap Iwan in Abergele and Coleg Cambria Deeside. She began playing football with Rhyl Hearts, a local boys team and in 2000 joined Tranmere Rovers. In 2009 she was voted Wales Girls' Player of the Year.

== Club career ==
Dutton played for Tranmere Rovers until 2011 when she moved to attend college in the USA. After her return from the USA she played for Llandudno from 2018, expect for the 2019–20 season that she spent at Connah's Quay.

== College career ==
Dutton attended East Tennessee State University, majoring in physical education. She scored three goals for the Buccaneers. She earned All-Southern Conference First-Team honors in 2014 after finishing the season with 18 assists.

After leaving college she worked as a coach for Lenoir–Rhyne University in North Carolina.

== International career ==
Dutton played in the Wales U15s from 2003. In 2006 she made her debut for the U17s before progressing to the U19s in 2007, whom she captained.

In 2009 she received her first cap against Slovenia, playing 8 games for the senior national team. She scored two goals - against Azerbaijan and Bulgaria.
