= Maes y Dre Recreation Ground =

Coordinates: 52.6555°N 3.1446°W

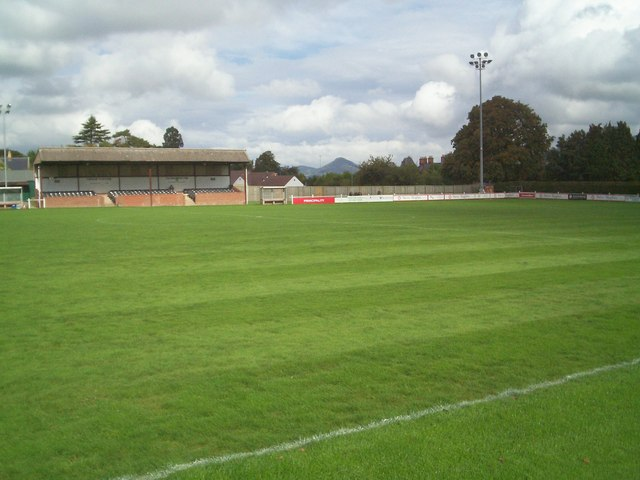
Maes-y-Dre Recreation Ground

Maes y Dre Recreation Ground is a multi-use stadium in Welshpool, Powys, Wales. It is currently used mostly for football matches and is the home ground of Welshpool Town F.C. It is also used for some cricket matches.

The stadium has a capacity of 3,000.
