= Federico Tobler =

Uruguayan footballer (born 1992)

Personal information
- Full name: Federico Tobler Caballero
- Date of birth: 15 May 1992 (age 34)
- Place of birth: Treinta y Tres, Uruguay
- Height: 1.90 m (6 ft 3 in)
- Position: Defender

Youth career
- Danubio
- –2013: Peñarol

Senior career*
Years	Team	Apps	(Gls)
2013–2014	Sud América		
2014–2015	St Joseph's		
2015	Rocha	6	(0)
2016–2017	Danubio		
2017	Lincoln Red Imps	1	(0)
2017–2018	Lynx	23	(0)
2018–2019	UP Plasencia	20	(2)
2019–2020	Real Tomayapo		
2020–2022	Bangor City		
- * Club domestic league appearances and goals as of 25 August 2020

Federico Tobler Caballero (born 15 May 1992) is a Uruguayan footballer who plays as a defender. He last played for Bangor City.

== Club career ==
In July 2019 he joined Real Tomayapo.

In January 2020 he joined Bangor City and in September he was appointed club captain. He left the club in February 2022.

== Career statistics ==
=== Club ===
As of 25 August 2020.

Club	Season	League			Cup		Continental		Other		Total	
Club	Season	Division	Apps	Goals	Apps	Goals	Apps	Goals	Apps	Goals	Apps	Goals
Rocha	2015–16	Segunda División	6	0	0	0	–		0	0	6	0
Lincoln Red Imps	2016–17	Gibraltar Premier Division	1	0	1 (Note: Appearances in the Rock Cup)	1	–		0	0	2	1
Lynx	2017–18	Gibraltar Premier Division	23	0	0	0	–		1 (Note: Appearances in the Gibraltar Premier Division Promotion/relegation play-off)	0	24	0
UP Plasencia	2018–19	Tercera División	20	2	0	0	–		0	0	20	2
Career total			50	2	1	1	0	0	1	0	52	3
