= Welsh League Cup =

Welsh football tournament

Cymru League Cup
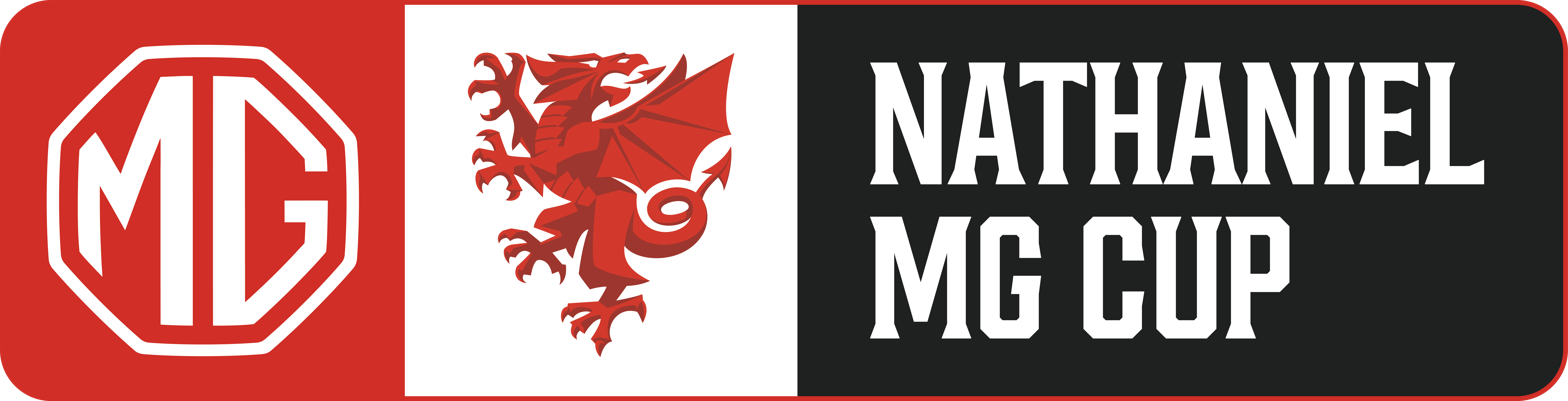
- Founded: 1992
- Teams: 46
- Current champions: Barry Town United (5th title)
- Most championships: The New Saints (11 titles)
- 2025–26 Welsh League Cup

The Cymru League Cup, currently known as the Nathaniel MG Cup for sponsorship reasons, is a cup competition in Welsh football organised by the Football Association of Wales.

The competition was established in 1992 and is considered to be the second-most important domestic cup competition for Welsh football clubs, after the older and more prestigious Welsh Cup. Unlike the Welsh Cup, where 135 teams entered in 2008–09, the competition is only open to the members of the Cymru Premier, the Cymru North, Cymru South and a very select few other clubs. It should not be confused with the Welsh Football League Cup, which was for the clubs in the Welsh Football League, which despite its name only covered the south and centre of Wales up until it was disbanded at the end of the 2018-19 season. For the 2023-24 season Cardiff City and Swansea City U21 sides are 'wildcard' entries into the competition.

It will not be played in the 2026–27 season, due to the expansion of the Cymru Premier leading to an increased number of fixtures for each team.

== Format ==
Since the inaugural season in 1992–93 the format of the competition has changed many times. The 2006–07 season saw the introduction of a new format for the competition. Beginning in August, the eighteen Welsh Premier League teams were split into six regionalised groups of three teams. The six group winners and two runners-up entered a quarter-final knock-out phase, followed by a two legged semi-final match before ending with the final in April.

A new format, introduced in 2014–15, saw a radical shake up for the competition. The 12 Cymru Premier teams were joined by six teams each from the two feeder leagues, and also four wildcard entrants. 24 teams entered Round 1, with the previous season's four semi-finalists receiving a bye through to Round 2. The draw for each round was regionalised as per competition rules, with teams being divided between northern and southern sections. The format changed slightly for the 2018–19 season, with each round up to the semi-finals being regionalised, and the semis an open draw. The semi-finals took place over a weekend for the first time.

From 2019-20 the format was expanded significantly with all 44 teams from the top two tiers of the Welsh football league system taking part as well as two wildcard entries. Twenty-eight clubs entered in Round 1, which was made up of any club without floodlights, the two wildcard entries, and the remaining teams ranked lowest in their respective Tier 2 league from the previous season. Round 1 was regionalised, as were all rounds up to the semi-final stage. The fourteen winners joined the eighteen remaining sides in Round 2, which was seeded so that Premier League sides are not drawn against one another. The winner of the tournament gained entry to the Scottish Challenge Cup.

== History ==
The first Welsh League Cup was won by Afan Lido in 1992–93, who beat Caersws FC 4–3 on penalties, after drawing in the final 1–1. The New Saints hold the record for the most League Cup titles; they have won the competition six times. Bangor City hold the distinction of making the most number of appearances in the final and losing on every occasion (6).

The New Saints dominated the competition between 2015 and 2018, winning all four finals during that period. Saints have won nine of the ten finals they have appeared in. They have however not made the final since beating Cardiff Met in 2018.

The 2018–19 final between Cardiff Met and Cambrian & Clydach Vale holds the record attendance in the competition, with 1,503 fans witnessing Met's first major trophy win.

=== Sponsorship ===
Since 2003, the League Cup has been named after its sponsor, giving it the following name:

- Loosemores League Cup (2003 to 2012), sponsored by Loosemores Solicitors (Cardiff)
- The Word Cup (2012 to 2016), sponsored by theWord, a Cardiff-based telecommunications provider.
- Nathaniel MG Cup (2016 to present), sponsored by Nathaniel MG Cars, a car sales company based in Bridgend and Cardiff.

=== EFL clubs ===
In 2024, a proposal was put forward to allow the (at that time) four Welsh clubs playing in the English Football League – Cardiff City, Swansea City, Wrexham and Newport County – entry into the Welsh League Cup, with a view to them being permitted to represent Wales in European football. Until 1995, Welsh clubs playing in the English football league system took part in the Welsh Cup, which granted the winner a place in the UEFA Cup Winners' Cup. However, they were excluded from 1996, with UEFA stating in 2012 that any such club playing outside the Welsh football league system would no longer be permitted to represent Wales in European football, with the only routes to qualification via English competitions. It was through this route that Swansea City played in the 2013–14 UEFA Europa League, having won the previous season's Football League Cup. The proposal submitted by the four clubs would see the Welsh League Cup be granted a place in the UEFA Conference League, with the four EFL clubs entering their first teams in the competition. While this would not impact their places in the English leagues, it would mean that they were no longer able to qualify for Europe via any English competition.

On 24 January 2025, the English FA rejected the proposal saying "undertook a thorough consultation with stakeholders" and rejected the proposals following "concerns raised by stakeholders regarding competition integrity, fixture congestion and player welfare, and the impact on the standing of existing competitions".

== Prize money ==
The total prize fund for the competition is £15,000. The league awards £1,000 to each losing semi-finalist, £3,000 to the runner-up and £10,000 to the competition winners.

== Past winners ==
Correct as of 28 February 2026.

Season	Winner	Score	Runner-up	Venue
1992–93	Afan Lido	1 – 1	Caersws	Park Avenue, Aberystwyth
1992–93	Afan Lido won 4–3 on penalties
1993–94	Afan Lido	1 – 0	Bangor City	Park Avenue, Aberystwyth
1994–95	Llansantffraid FC	2 – 1	Ton Pentre F.C.	Latham Park, Newtown
1995–96	Connah's Quay Nomads	1 – 0	Ebbw Vale	Recreation Ground, Caersws
1996–97	Barry Town	2 – 2	Bangor City	Park Avenue, Aberystwyth
1996–97	Barry Town won 4–2 on penalties
1997–98	Barry Town	1 – 1	Bangor City	Farrar Road, Bangor
1997–98	Barry Town won 5–4 on penalties
1998–99	Barry Town	3 – 0	Caernarfon Town	Park Avenue, Aberystwyth
1999–2000	Barry Town	6 – 0	Bangor City	Park Avenue, Aberystwyth
2000–01	Caersws	2 – 0	Barry Town	Park Avenue, Aberystwyth
2001–02	Caersws	2 – 1	Cwmbran Town	Park Avenue, Aberystwyth
2002–03	Rhyl	2 – 2	Bangor City	Belle Vue, Rhyl
2002–03	Rhyl won 4–3 on penalties
2003–04	Rhyl	4 – 0	Carmarthen Town	Latham Park, Newtown
2004–05	Carmarthen Town	2 – 0 (a.e.t.)	Rhyl	Latham Park, Newtown
2005–06	The New Saints	4 – 0	Port Talbot Town	Park Avenue, Aberystwyth
2006–07	Caersws	1 – 1	Rhyl	Park Avenue, Aberystwyth
2006–07	Caersws won 3–1 on penalties
2007–08	Llanelli	2 – 0	Rhyl	Latham Park, Newtown
2008–09	The New Saints	2 – 0	Bangor City	Latham Park, Newtown
2009–10	The New Saints	3 – 1	Rhyl	The Airfield, Broughton
2010–11	The New Saints	4 – 3 (a.e.t.)	Llanelli	Park Avenue, Aberystwyth
2011–12	Afan Lido	1 – 1	Newtown	Park Avenue, Aberystwyth
2011–12	Afan Lido won 3–2 on penalties
2012–13	Carmarthen Town	3 – 3	The New Saints	Latham Park, Newtown
2012–13	Carmarthen Town won 3–1 on penalties
2013–14	Carmarthen Town	0 – 0	Bala Town	Park Avenue, Aberystwyth
2013–14	Carmarthen Town won 3–1 on penalties
2014–15	The New Saints	3 – 0	Bala Town	Latham Park, Newtown
2015–16	The New Saints	2 – 0	Denbigh Town	Maesdu Park, Llandudno
2016–17	The New Saints	4 – 0	Barry Town United	Cyncoed Stadium, Cardiff
2017–18	The New Saints	1 – 0	Cardiff MU	Park Avenue, Aberystwyth
2018–19	Cardiff MU	2 – 0	Cambrian & Clydach Vale	Jenner Park, Barry
2019–20	Connah's Quay Nomads	3 – 0	STM Sports	Latham Park, Newtown
2020–21	Cancelled due to COVID-19 pandemic
2021–22	Connah's Quay Nomads	0 – 0	Cardiff MU	SDM Glass Stadium, Bridgend
2021–22	Connah's Quay Nomads won 10–9 on penalties
2022–23	Bala Town	0 – 0	Connah's Quay Nomads	The Rock, Wrexham
2022–23	Bala Town won 4–3 on penalties
2023–24	The New Saints	5 – 1	Swansea City U21s	Jenner Park, Barry
2024–25	The New Saints	1 – 0	Aberystwyth Town	Latham Park, Newtown
2025–26	Barry Town United	2 – 0	The New Saints	DragonBet Stadium, Bridgend

== Results by team ==
Club	Winners	Runners-up	Total Appearance	Last Final
The New Saints	11	2	13	2026
Barry Town United	5	2	7	2026
Caersws	3	1	4	2007
Carmarthen Town	3	1	4	2014
Connah's Quay Nomads	3	1	4	2023
Afan Lido	3	–	3	2012
Rhyl	2	4	6	2010
Cardiff MU	1	2	3	2022
Bala Town	1	2	3	2023
Llanelli	1	1	2	2011
Bangor City	–	6	6	2009
Caernarfon Town	–	1	1	1999
Cambrian & Clydach Vale	–	1	1	2019
Cwmbran Town	–	1	1	2002
Denbigh Town	–	1	1	2016
Ebbw Vale	–	1	1	1996
Newtown	–	1	1	2012
Port Talbot Town	–	1	1	2006
STM Sports	–	1	1	2020
Swansea City U21s	–	1	1	2024
Ton Pentre	–	1	1	1995
Aberystwyth	–	1	1	2025

Notes:

- Barry Town United's total includes wins as Barry Town
- The New Saints' total includes wins under previous names: Total Network Solutions and Llansantffraid.

== See also ==
- Football in Wales
- Welsh football league system
- Welsh Cup
- FAW Premier Cup
- List of football clubs in Wales
- List of stadiums in Wales by capacity
