= Giácomo Mello =

Brazilian footballer (born 1992)

Giacomo Mello
Personal information
- Full name: Giácomo Mello Corbellini
- Date of birth: 8 November 1992 (age 34)
- Place of birth: Porto Alegre, Brazil
- Height: 1.74 m (5 ft 9 in)
- Position: Midfielder

Youth career
- –2012: Botafogo

Senior career*
Years	Team	Apps	(Gls)
2012	Botafogo	0	(0)
2012	→ Os Limianos (loan)	9	(2)
2014–2015	Tombense		
2014–2015	→ Nacional-MG (loan)		
2016–2017	Vigor Acquapendente		
2017–2018	Ruch Chorzów	26	(4)
2018–2019	Zagłębie Sosnowiec	5	(0)
2019–2020	Akzhayik	25	(7)
2020–2022	Bangor City	11	(2)
2022	Connah's Quay Nomads	7	(3)
2022–2024	FC Calvi Noale		
2024–2026	ACD Portomansué		
- * Club domestic league appearances and goals as of 7 November 2024

Giácomo Mello Corbellini (born 8 November 1992), sometimes known as just Mello, is a Brazilian footballer. He holds an Italian passport.

== Club career ==
A product of Botafogo’s academy, Mello played for teams in Brazil, Italy and Poland. He played in Kazakhstan for Akzhayik before in August 2020 he signed for Welsh side Bangor City. He left the club in January 2022. He then joined Connah's Quay Nomads leaving the club at the end of the 2021–22 season.

== Career statistics ==
=== Club ===
As of 4 April 2019.

Club	Season	League			National cup (Note: Includes Polish Cup)		Continental		Other		Total	
Club	Season	Division	Apps	Goals	Apps	Goals	Apps	Goals	Apps	Goals	Apps	Goals
Botafogo	2012	Série A	0	0	0	0	—		0	0	0	0
Os Limianos (loan)	2011–12	Segunda Divisão	9	2	0	0	—		0	0	9	2
Ruch Chorzów	2017–18	I liga	26	4	0	0	—		—		26	4
Zagłębie Sosnowiec	2018–19	Ekstraklasa	5	0	1	0	—		—		6	0
Career total			40	6	1	0	0	0	0	0	41	6
