= Maes Tegid =

Field in Wales

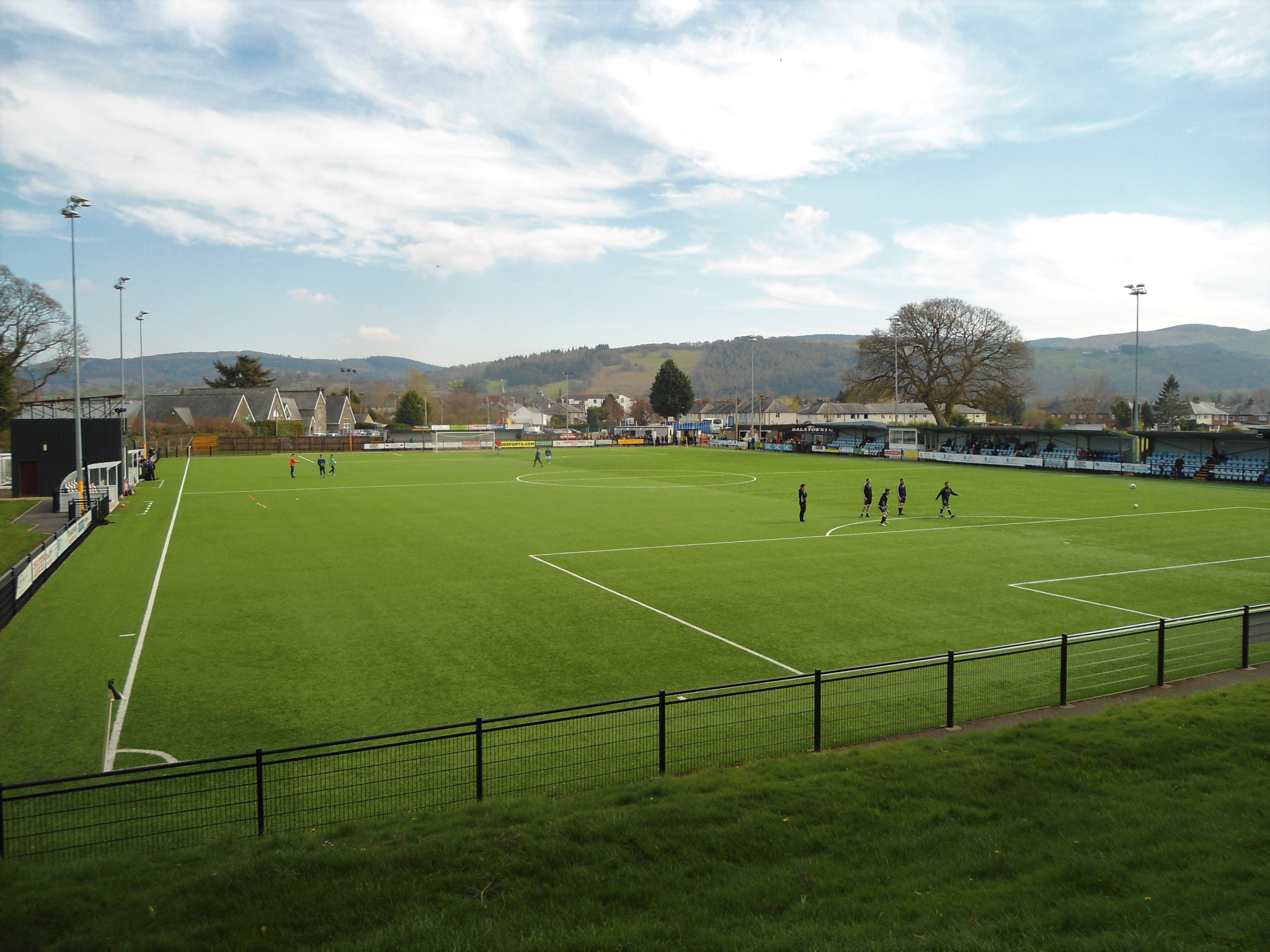
- Interactive map of Maes Tegid
- Location: Bala, Gwynedd, Wales
- Coordinates: 52°54′44″N 3°36′5″W
- Capacity: 3,000
- Surface: 3G Artificial Turf

Tenant
- Bala Town F.C.

Maes Tegid (Welsh for 'Tegid field') is a community playing field in Bala, Wales. It is currently used mostly for football matches, and is the home ground of Bala Town (Welsh: Clwb Pêl-droed y Bala).

The stadium holds 3,000 people, with 504 seats and has been used by Bala Town since the 1950s. The seats at Maes Tegid are second-hand from Chesterfield and Coventry City, and were installed when Bala won promotion to the Welsh Premier League. Bala Town have used Rhyl's Belle Vue stadium and The New Saints’s Park Hall Ground for European matches due to UEFA stadium regulations.

In January 2016, Bala Town begun discussions to install a synthetic 3G pitch at Maes Tegid. In February 2016 it was announced by the Football Association of Wales that Bala Town had been successful in applying for a synthetic 3G pitch at Maes Tegid with completion due ahead of the 2016–17 Welsh Premier League. In September 2016, the 3G artificial turf was successfully installed at Maes Tegid.

The record attendance at Maes Tegid was set on 14 August 2009 in a match against Bangor City, with an attendance of 938.

A number of sports websites have named Maes Tegid as "The Most Beautiful Place to Watch Football in the UK".

In August 2025 the local council approved a plan to install "VAR Lite" at Maes Tegid, this is a simpler and cheaper version of VAR.
