= Bala Town F.C. =

Association football club in Wales

Bala Town
- Full name: Bala Town Football Club
- Nickname: Lakesiders
- Founded: 1880; 146 years ago
- Ground: Maes Tegid, Bala
- Capacity: 3,000 (504 seated)
- Chairman: Arwel Roberts
- Manager: Steve Fisher
- League: Cymru North
- 2025–26: Cymru Premier, 11th of 12 (relegated)
- Website: www.balatownfc.net
Home colours	Away colours

Bala Town Football Club (Welsh: Clwb Pêl-droed y Bala, lit. 'Bala football club') is a Welsh professional football club from Bala, Gwynedd, who play in the Cymru North. They play their home games at Maes Tegid.

== History ==
For a full history see; List of Bala Town FC seasons

Although the current Bala Town was formed in 1880, there is record of a football club competing in the 1877–78 Welsh Cup, losing to Corwen after two replays. After Bala North End, Bala South End and Bala Thursdays merged, Bala Town's first available league status record is playing in the Welsh National League (North) Division 2 East in the 1921–22 season. Bala Town moved to their current home, Maes Tegid, in the early 1950s and joined the Wrexham Alliance in 1950, however Bala Town had to wait for more than a century until they were promoted to the second tier of Welsh football, into the Cymru Alliance at the end of the 2003–04 season. After only four seasons in the Cymru Alliance, Bala Town sealed promotion to the Cymru Premier.

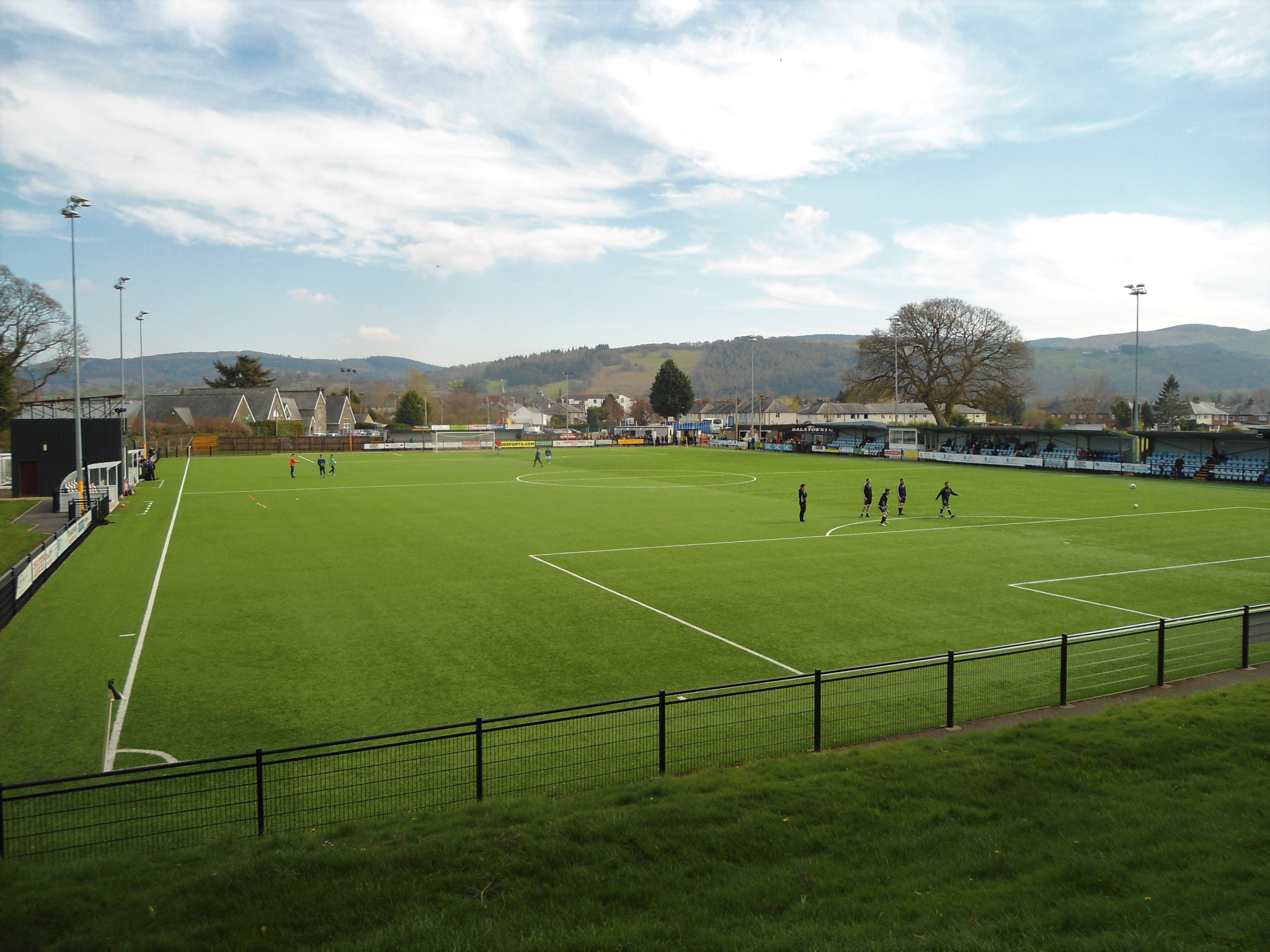
A view of Maes Tegid from the corner

Bala Town secured European football for the first time in their history after a John Irving goal in the 89th minute was enough to see off Port Talbot Town 2–1 to ensure the Lakesiders a European place. Bala Town were drawn against Estonian outfit Levadia Tallinn in the Europa League first qualifying round but after winning the home leg 1–0, they lost 3–1 in the reverse fixture in Tallinn and were eliminated. In the 2014–15 season, the Lakesiders finished second, their highest ever league position, thus qualifying for the 2015–16 UEFA Europa League. Bala Town missed out the opportunity of playing Turkish giants Trabzonspor in the 2015–16 Europa League after losing on aggregate to FC Differdange 03 after falling victim to an injury time Differdange goal, however Bala maintained a proud record of a 100% win percentage at "home", playing at Rhyl's Belle Vue stadium due to UEFA stadium requirements on both occasions, in Europe.

After finishing second in the 2015–16 Cymru Premier they followed this success up by winning their first Welsh Cup, beating The New Saints 2–1 in the final ending their 8 trophy winning streak.

In the 2021–22 season Bala Town secured a runners-up finish for the third time in their history behind champions The New Saints. The 2023–24 season then saw Bala secure a third-place finish.

In June 2025 it was announced that Colin Caton had stepped down as manager after 22 years at the club. Before resigning he was the longest serving manager in the Cymru Premier.

At the end of the 2025–26 season, the club was relegated on the last day of the season to the Cymru North.

== Stadium ==
Bala Town have played at Maes Tegid in Bala since the 1950s. For European matches they use Rhyl's Belle Vue stadium due to UEFA stadium regulations. They lost a 2021–22 Europa Conference League qualifying match at Park Hall to Sligo Rovers on 8 July 2021.

== European record ==
Season	Competition	Round	Club	Home	Away	Aggregate
2013–14	UEFA Europa League	1Q	(Estonia) Levadia Tallinn	1–0	1–3	2–3
2015–16	UEFA Europa League	1Q	(Luxembourg) Differdange	2–1	1–3	3–4
2016–17	UEFA Europa League	1Q	(Sweden) AIK	0–2	0–2	0–4
2017–18	UEFA Europa League	1Q	(Liechtenstein) Vaduz	1–2	0–3	1–5
2018–19	UEFA Europa League	PR	(San Marino) Tre Fiori	1–0	0–3	1–3
2020–21	UEFA Europa League	1Q	(Malta) Valletta	—N/a	1–0	—N/a
2020–21	UEFA Europa League	2Q	(Belgium) Standard Liège	—N/a	0–2	—N/a
2021–22	UEFA Europa Conference League	1Q	(Northern Ireland) Larne	0–1	0–1	0–2
2022–23	UEFA Europa Conference League	1Q	(Republic of Ireland) Sligo Rovers	1–2	1–0 (a.e.t.)	2–2 (3–4 p)
2024–25	UEFA Conference League	1Q	(Estonia) Paide Linnameeskond	1–2	1–1 (a.e.t.)	2–3

Notes

- PR: Preliminary round
- 1Q: First qualifying round
- 2Q: Second qualifying round

== Current squad ==
As of 15 September 2026

Note: Flags indicate national team as defined under FIFA eligibility rules; some limited exceptions apply. Players may hold more than one non-FIFA nationality.

No.	Pos.	Nation	Player
1	GK	ENG	La’Trell Jones
2	DF	WAL	Jake Phillips
4	DF	ENG	Tom Kelly
5	DF	ENG	Will Bell
6	DF	ENG	Iwan Lewis
7	FW	ENG	Jamie Cumming
8	MF	ENG	Nathan Burke (Captain)
9	FW	ENG	Craig Lindfield
10	FW	WAL	John Owen
11	FW	ENG	Mike Hayes
12	FW	ENG	Osebi Abadaki

No.	Pos.	Nation	Player
14	MF	WAL	Tom Jones
15	MF	WAL	Henry Evans
16	MF	ENG	James Farr
17	FW	SKN	Okera Simmonds
21	FW	ENG	Charlie Fisher
22	FW	WAL	Aron Williams (on loan from Colwyn Bay)
23	DF	WAL	Ross White
24	MF	ENG	Kyle Harrison
28	DF	WAL	Naim Arsan
48	MF	WAL	Calum Roberts
—	MF	ENG	Oliver Shannon

== Notable former players ==
- David Artell - Former Gibraltar international
- Dave Edwards - Former Wales international and Premier League footballer
- Mark Jones - Former Wales international
- Kenny Lunt - Over 370 appearances in the English Football League
- Chris Venables - Multiple Cymru Premier Golden boot award winner

For all players with a Wikipedia article see Category:Bala Town F.C. players.

== Honours ==
- Cymru Premier:
  - Runners-up (3): 2014–15, 2015–16, 2021–22
- Welsh Cup
  - Winners (1): 2016–17
- Cymru Premier Cup:
  - Winners (1): 2022–23
  - Runners-up (2): 2013–14, 2014–15
- Cymru Alliance
  - Winners (1): 2008–09
  - Runners-up (2): 2006–07, 2007–08
- Welsh National League (Wrexham Area) Premier Division
  - Winners (1): 2003–04
- Cambrian Coast Football League
  - Winners (2): 1958–59; 1962-63
- North East Wales FA Challenge Cup
  - Winners (4): 1971–72, 2003–04, 2006–07, 2007–08
- North East Wales FA Junior (Horace Wynne) Cup
  - Winners (1): 1996–97

== Managerial history ==
- Colin Caton (2003–June 2025) – 880 matches
- Steve Fisher (June 2025–)
