= The Airfield =

Football stadium in Flintshire, Wales

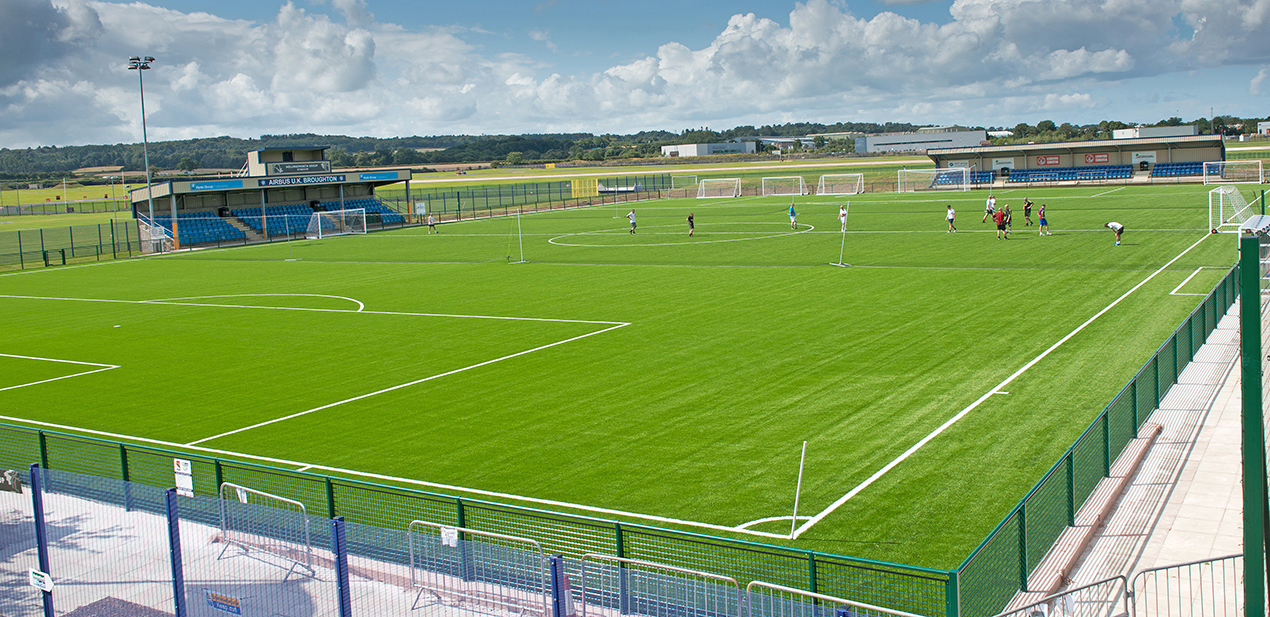
- Interactive map of The Airfield
- Location: Broughton, Wales
- Coordinates: 53.1715°N 2.9815°W
- Capacity: 1,600 (500 seated)
- Surface: 3G Artificial Turf

The Airfield, also known by its sponsored name as the Hollingsworth Group International Airfield, is a football stadium in Broughton, Flintshire, Wales. It is home to Airbus UK Broughton F.C., who play in the Cymru Premier. In 2014, the grass surface was replaced with a 3G synthetic pitch.

== History ==
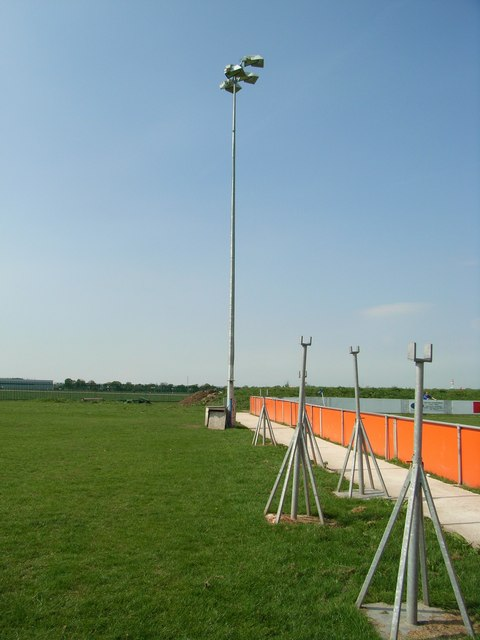
One of the retractable floodlights

The Airfield is noted in Welsh football for having retractable floodlights due to the ground being located close to a working runway at Hawarden Airport. Steve Williams, chairman of the Football Association of Wales, stated that he wanted the Wales national football teams to play more international matches in north Wales. The Airfield was suggested as a location for friendlies. The Airfield, however, does not meet UEFA standards, meaning the only international ground in north Wales is the Racecourse Ground in Wrexham. Due to failing to meet UEFA standards, Airbus UK Broughton also have to play their home UEFA competition matches away from The Airfield.

In 2004, Airbus UK Broughton were promoted from the Cymru Alliance into the League of Wales. However, The Airfield did not meet the LOW's standards. Airbus UK Broughton decided to groundshare at Conwy United's Y Morfa Stadium in order to partake in the league while they upgraded The Airfield. Airbus UK's first opponents in the League of Wales at The Airfield were Total Network Solutions. In 2012, Airbus UK Broughton sold the naming rights of The Airfield to the Hollingsworth Group and renamed The Airfield. Due to regular waterlogging of the pitch, The Airfield's grass surface was replaced with a 3G synthetic pitch in 2014. This came after funding was raised by UEFA, the FAW and the Airbus Sports and Social Club.

=== Ground-sharing ===
In 2020, Gresford Athletic agreed a temporary ground-share at The Airfield for the 2020–21 season due to COVID-19 restrictions. In September 2024 Gresford moved to The Airfield again having previously used The Rock in Rhosymedre, and it took until April 2026 for them to return to Clappers Lane in Gresford. For the 2026–27 season it is currently shared with Ardal North West side Broughton United.
