= Park Avenue, Aberystwyth =

Stadium in Aberystwyth, Wales

Coordinates: 52°24′37″N 4°4′51″W

Park Avenue
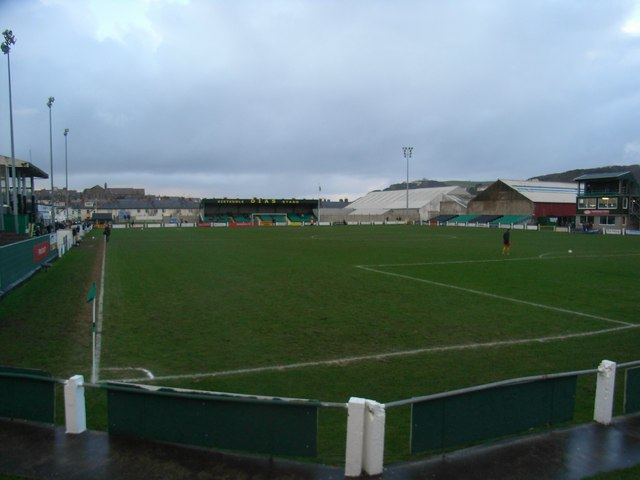
- Interactive map of Park Avenue
- Full name: Park Avenue
- Location: Aberystwyth, Wales
- Owner: Ceredigion County Council
- Operator: Aberystwyth Town Football Club
- Capacity: 5,000 (1,500 seated)
- Surface: 3G Artificial Turf
- Public transit: Aberystwyth (0.3 miles)

Construction
- Opened: 1907

Tenant
- Aberystwyth Town F.C. (1907-present)

Park Avenue (Welsh: Coedlan y Parc) currently called Aberystwyth University Stadium for sponsorship purposes, is a football stadium in Aberystwyth, Wales and has served as the home of Cymru Premier side Aberystwyth Town since 1907.

The stadium capacity is 5,000 with 1,500 seats. It is a 4G artificial turf pitch. In May 2021, the ground was designated UEFA Category 2 status after successful inspection by Standards Officer Scott Struthers. The ground is adjacent to the River Rheidol and close to the shore of Cardigan Bay. The ground has a bar, named after John Charles, who played in the Wales national football team.

== Layout ==
The ground has five areas: the Railway End, named after the former Carmarthen to Aberystwyth Line; the Dias Stand after a former Green Legend; the Rhun Owens Stand after a former secretary; the Shed End and the Narks Corner.

== History ==
The ground has hosted the final of the Welsh League Cup on eleven occasions. The club renamed the hospitality room the 'Lolfa Emyr James' (Emyr James Suite) after a board member who died in August 2018.
