= Airbus UK Broughton F.C. =

Football club in Wales

Airbus UK Broughton
- Full name: Airbus UK Broughton Football Club
- Nicknames: The Wingmakers, The Belugas
- Founded: 1946; 80 years ago (as Vickers-Armstrong)
- Ground: Hollingsworth Group Stadium; Broughton
- Capacity: 1,600 (500 seated)
- Owner(s): Broughton Wings Sports and Social Club
- Chairman: Michael Mayfield
- Manager: Mark Allen
- League: Cymru Premier
- 2025–26: Cymru North, 2nd of 16 (promoted)
- Website: https://www.airbusukfc.com/
Home colours	Away colours

Airbus UK Broughton Football Club is a semi-professional football club based in Broughton, Flintshire, Wales. They had their origins as the works team of the Airbus UK factory in Broughton where the wings of Airbus aircraft are produced, and are consequently nicknamed The Wingmakers or The Planemakers. They play in the Cymru Premier.

The club was promoted to the Cymru Premier for the first time in 2004, and play at The Hollingsworth Group Stadium (previously known as The Airfield), Broughton (capacity 1,600, of which 500 are seated); however as their pitch could not be brought up to Cymru Premier standards in time following their promotion, for their first two games they shared Conwy United's ground. The Airfield features three unusual retracting floodlights as it is adjacent to an operational runway. In 2014, the grass surface was replaced with a 3G synthetic pitch. At the end of the 2016–17 season the club were relegated to the Cymru Alliance having finished bottom of the league.

In the 2022–23 season, the club finished with -4 points after being deducted 6 points and losing all but two matches. As a result, they were relegated back to the Cymru North after having been promoted in the 2021–22 season.

== History ==
Formed in 1946, the club has known several different names as the ownership of the factory has changed over the years. Originally called Vickers-Armstrong, it has variously been named de Havillands, Hawker Siddeley, British Aerospace, and BAE Systems.

The club's early years were spent in the Chester & District League and the Wrexham area leagues. The club won the Welsh National League (Wrexham Area) Division Two title during the 1991–92 season, when they won 28 of their 34 matches and scored 130 goals to finish 19 points ahead of their nearest rival. They then spent four years making steady improvements in their position in the Welsh National League (Wrexham Area) Division One before being promoted to the Welsh National League Premier Division at the end of the 1995–96 season when they were runners-up in Division One. They spent four years in the Premier Division before winning promotion to the Cymru Alliance at the end of the 1999–2000 season, when they won 21 of their 30 matches. To coincide with this promotion the club changed its name to Airbus UK.

Once again they spent four seasons in their new league, successively finishing in 11th, 8th, and 5th positions before winning the league title by 19 points in 2003–04 to earn promotion to the top level of Welsh domestic football for the first time.

Airbus' first season in the Premier League was a torrid time, with the team acquiring only 21 points in the first 32 matches and being in next-to-last position with only a few matches remaining. Their manager, Rob Lythe, who had led them to promotion, resigned in February 2005, citing "not having enough time" to do the job. The Wingmakers eventually avoided relegation in their debut season after a victory over local rivals Connah's Quay Nomads and a 1–0 defeat at Caersws on the last day.

Airbus made a promising start to their second season in the WPL, reaching the semi-final of the League Cup eventually losing out to TNS Llansantffraid over two legs.

For the start of the 2007–08 season, the club changed its name once more, adding the village name to become "Airbus UK Broughton F.C.". Owing to UEFA's rules over sponsorship, when competing in European competition the club is known as "AUK Broughton".

During their time in the Cymru Premier, Airbus UK Broughton went from relegation strugglers to a club that challenged regularly for honours. They qualified for Europe for the first time in 2013 as Cymru Premier runners-up, repeating the feat the following season and appearing in the Europa League for a third consecutive time as third-place finishers in 2015.

In May 2016 the club reached the Welsh Cup final for the first time, losing 2–0 to The New Saints at Wrexham's Racecourse Ground. They just failed to qualify for Europe again, losing 1–0 in the Play-off final to neighbours Gap Connah's Quay. A difficult summer saw the majority of players recruited by other Welsh Premier clubs and director of football Andy Preece leaving the club by mutual consent three days before the start of the next campaign, to be replaced by former player Andrew Thomas.

The 2016–17 season produced only five wins and saw first round exits from both the League Cup and Welsh Cup, ending with the Wingmakers finishing in bottom place and being relegated back to the Cymru Alliance ending 13 seasons in the Welsh top flight. In the 2018-19 season, Airbus won the Cymru Alliance title for a second time after a 4-0 victory over Holywell Town and won promotion back to the Cymru Premier as well as completing a double by defeating Holyhead Hotspur 5-1 in the League Cup final.

== Honours ==
- Welsh National League (Wrexham Area) Division Two:

Winners: 1991–92

- Welsh National League (Wrexham Area) Division One:

Runners-up: 1995–96

- Welsh National League (Wrexham Area) Premier Division:

Winners: 1999–00

- Cymru Alliance:

Winners: 2003–04, 2018-19

- Cymru Alliance League Cup:

Winners: 2018-19

- Cymru North:

Winners: 2021–22
Runners-up: 2024–25, 2025–26

- Cymru Premier:

Runners-up: 2012–13, 2013–14

- Welsh Cup:

Finalists: 2015–16

- Welsh Blood Service League Cup - National
  - Winners: 2024-25, 2025-26
- Welsh Blood Service League Cup - Northern
  - Winners: 2024-25
- NEWFA Challenge Cup
  - Winners: 2024-25, 2025–26

== European record ==
Season	Competition	Round	Club	Home	Away	Aggregate
2013–14	UEFA Europa League	First qualifying round	(Latvia) Ventspils	1–1	0–0	1–1 (a)
2014–15	UEFA Europa League	First qualifying round	(Norway) Haugesund	1–1	1–2	2–3
2015–16	UEFA Europa League	First qualifying round	(Croatia) Lokomotiva	1–3	2–2	3–5

== Current squad ==
As of 4 September 2026

Note: Flags indicate national team as defined under FIFA eligibility rules; some limited exceptions apply. Players may hold more than one non-FIFA nationality.

No.	Pos.	Nation	Player
1	GK	ENG	Louis Fallon (on loan from Altrincham)
2	MF	WAL	Tyler McManus
3	DF	WAL	Kieran Evans
4	DF	ENG	Joshua Stevenson
5	DF	WAL	Joe Palmer
6	MF	ENG	Sam Rickett
7	MF	WAL	Mason Blackwell
8	MF	WAL	Jordan Evans
9	FW	ENG	Jack Parry
10	FW	WAL	Kaiden Cooke
11	MF	WAL	George Peers

No.	Pos.	Nation	Player
12	DF	GER	Brandon Diau
13	GK	ENG	Keighan Jones
14	FW	WAL	James Hughes (on loan from Connah's Quay Nomads)
16	DF	ENG	Evan Smith
17	FW	WAL	Jake Roberts
18	MF	ENG	Oliver Calland
19	FW	WAL	Ollie Lanceley
21	GK	WAL	Jacob Carroll
22	MF	ENG	Sean Moscrop
23	DF	WAL	Nathan Williams
61	GK	WAL	Jacob Clement

=== Development Team ===
The following players have been included in first team match day squads this season.

Note: Flags indicate national team as defined under FIFA eligibility rules; some limited exceptions apply. Players may hold more than one non-FIFA nationality.

No.	Pos.	Nation	Player
28	DF	ENG	Louis Bebbington-Roberts
30	MF	WAL	Dylan Cusato
31	DF	ENG	William Green
32		ENG	
35	MF	ENG	Harry Henderson
38		POL	
40		ENG	Alex Mossman

No.	Pos.	Nation	Player
44	DF	WAL	Caiden Baker-Williams
48	FW	ENG	Finlay Hayes
50	FW	WAL	Jack Davies
55	FW	ENG	Will Hewitt
59	FW	POL	Kacper Bury
60	MF	WAL	Jack Griffiths

=== Out on loan ===
Note: Flags indicate national team as defined under FIFA eligibility rules; some limited exceptions apply. Players may hold more than one non-FIFA nationality.

No.	Pos.	Nation	Player
15	MF	WAL	Ieuan Jones-Wellstead (at Llay Welfare until January 2027)

== Staff ==
As of 27 July 2025

- Manager: Mark Allen
- Assistant Manager: Richard Chapman
- First Team Goalkeeping Coach: Chris Vales
- Physiotherapist: Ritson Lloyd
- Sports Therapists: Emily Luke & Ryan Evans

=== Managers ===
- Rob Lythe (? – Feb 2005)
- Garry Wynne (Feb 2005 – June 2005)
- (Wales) Gareth Owen (June 2005 – June 2008)
- (England) Craig Harrison (July 2008 – 2011)
- (Wales) Gareth Owen (Dec 2011 – Jan 2012)
- (England) Andy Preece (Jan 2012 – Aug 2016)
- (Wales) Andrew Thomas (Aug 2016 – Nov 2017)
- (Wales) Steve O'Shaughnessy (Nov 2017 – Sep 2022)
- (Wales) Jamie Reed (Oct 2022–2023)
