= 2012–13 Welsh Cup =

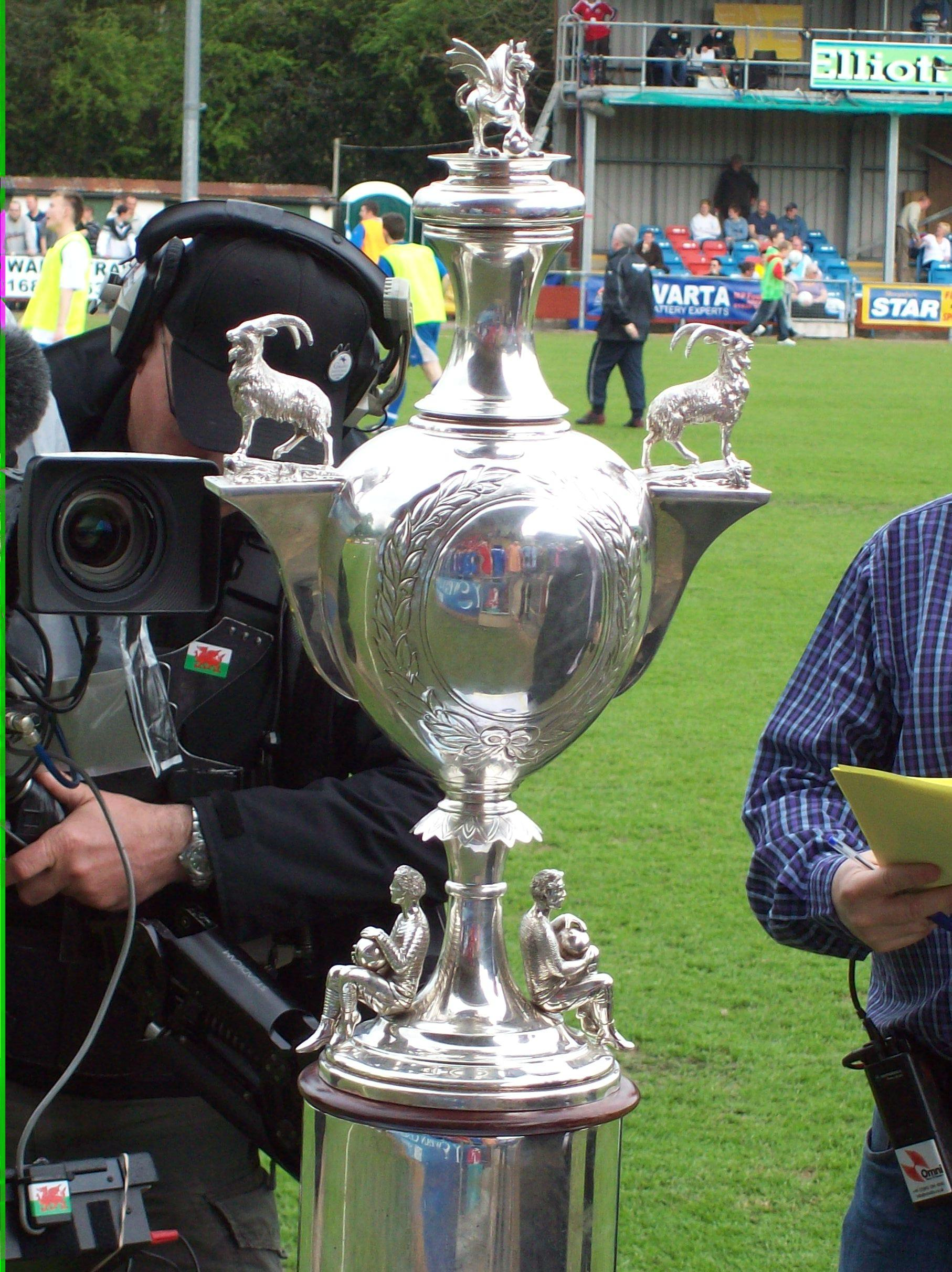
- The Welsh Cup

Tournament details
- Country: Wales
- Teams: 182

Final positions
- Champions: Prestatyn Town
- Runners-up: Bangor City

The 2012–13 FAW Welsh Cup was the 126th season of the annual knockout tournament for competitive football teams in Wales. The 2012–13 tournament commenced on 18 August 2012, and will run until the final in May 2013. The winner of the Cup qualifies to the first qualifying round of the 2013–14 UEFA Europa League.

== Qualifying round one ==
Qualifying Round One will be played on either Saturday 18th or Sunday 19 August 2012.

=== North ===
Team 1	Score	Team 2
Amlwch Town	0–3	Corwen
Connah's Quay Town	4–0	Flint Mountain
Greenfield	w/o	West Shore
Gresford Athletic	2–1	New Brighton Villa
Halkyn United	w/o	Caernarfon Wanderers
Johnstown Youth	0–6	Llanuwchllyn
Knighton Town	4–1	Gaerwen
Lex XI	3–1	Machynlleth
Llandyrnog United	3–4	Bodedern Athletic
Llanfairpwll	3–1	Nantlle Vale
Llanfyllin	2–6	Bethel
Llanllyfni	4–3	Castell Alun Colts
Llanystumdwy	0–2	Caerwys
Montgomery Town	7–1	Blaenau Amateurs
Nomads of Connah's Quay	3–1	Kinmel Bay Sports
Pen y Ffordd	1–0	Penmaenmawr Phoenix
Penrhyndeudraeth	w/o	Acton Village
Presteigne St Andrews	4–1	Kerry
Trearddur Bay United	10–0	Penley

=== South ===
Team 1	Score	Team 2
Cardiff Hibernian	0–1	Aber Valley
Cardiff Metropolitan University	1–2	Splott Albion
Carnetown	2–5	Aberfan
Ely Valley	3–5	Kenfig Hill
Fleur de Lys Welfare	1–2	Bridgend Street
Garw	0–2	Llantwit Major
Llanharry	0–5	Treforest
Llanwern	3–1	Tonyrefail
Llwydcoed	8–2	Cwmbrân Town
Merthyr Saints	0–2	Cwmamman United
Nelson Cavaliers	1–3	Pontyclun
Newcastle Emlyn	1–3	Chepstow Town
Newport Civil Service	3–4	Cardiff Grange Harlequins
Penrhiwceiber CA	1–9	Abertillery Bluebirds
Perthcelyn United	4–0	Tredegar Athletic
Pontypridd Town	5–0	Graig y Rhacca
Porthcawl Town Athletic	1–2	Brecon Corinthians
Rhydyfelin	1–4	Llantwit Fardre
STM Sports	0–4	Ton & Gelli
Tredegar Town	5–1	Llandrindod Wells
Trefelin	2–3	Risca United
Treharris Athletic Western	3–2	Baglan Dragons
Treowen Stars	5–1	Trethomas Bluebirds

== Qualifying round two ==
Qualifying Round Two will be played on either Saturday 8 or Sunday 9 September 2012.

=== North ===
Team 1	Score	Team 2
Berriew	3–4	Caernarfon Town
Bethel	1–2	Llanrug United
Bethesda Athletic	0–3	Corwen
Bodedern Athletic	4–2	Lex XI
Brickfield Rangers	3–1	Dolgellau
Brymbo	6–0	Caerwys
Cefn	w/o	Greenfield
Coedpoeth United	3–2	Trearddur Bay United
Connah's Quay Town	0–7	Gwalchmai
Gresford Athletic	0–7	Denbigh Town
Holywell Town	3–0	Llanfairpwll
Knighton Town	2–4	Four Crosses
Llanberis	1–0	Pen y Ffordd
Llandudno Junction	3–0	Llangollen Town
Llangefni Town	0–4	Waterloo Rovers
Llanllyfni	2–1	Barmouth & Dyffryn United
Llanrwst United	1–3	Pwllheli
Llansantffraid	1–0	Bow Street
Llanuwchllyn	2–0	Nefyn United
Montgomery Town	6–2	Chirk AAA
Nomads of Connah's Quay	1–4	Llanidloes Town
Penrhyndeudraeth	2–3	Halkyn United
Presteigne St Andrews	3–2	Glantraeth
Rhos Aelwyd	0–4	Glan Conwy
Tywyn & Bryncrug	0–3	Mold Alexandra
Venture Community	2–0	Overton Recreation
Welshpool Town	1–2	Carno

=== South ===
Team 1	Score	Team 2
Aberbargoed Buds	3–0	Perthcelyn United
Ammanford	5–1	Kenfig Hill
Bettws	2–2	Pontyclun
Brecon Corinthians	4–1	Aberaeron
Bridgend Street	1–0	Aberfan
Briton Ferry Llansawel	1–3	Pontypridd Town
Builth Wells	0–4	Llwydcoed
Caldicot Town	1–2	Treforest
Cardiff Corinthians	0–5	Caerau
Cardiff Grange Harlequins	3–0	Treharris Athletic Western
Chepstow Town	2–1	Ton & Gelli
Croesyceiliog	4–0	Treowen Stars
Cwmaman Institute	4–6	Newbridge-on-Wye
Garden Village	1–4	Ely Rangers
Goytre	3–0	Abertillery Bluebirds
Llantwit Fardre	1–0	Aber Valley
Llantwit Major	1–2	Caerau (Ely)
Penrhiwceiber Rangers	1–3	Dinas Powys
Risca United	2–1	Newport YMCA
Splott Albion	2–6	Cwmamman United
Tredegar Town	1–2	Llanwern

== Round one ==
Round One will be played on either Saturday 6 or Sunday 7 October 2012.

=== North ===
Team 1	Score	Team 2
Brickfield Rangers	2–5	Pwllheli
Brymbo	1–1 (3–0 pen.)	Penycae
Caernarfon Town	0–0 (3–4 pen.)	Conwy Borough
Cefn Druids	7–1	Llanberis
Coedpoeth United	1–2	Caersws
Corwen	2–1 (a.e.t.)	Ruthin Town
Flint Town United	3–2	Guilsfield
Four Crosses	1–2	Llanrug United
Gwalchmai	4–1	Carno
Halkyn United	1–6	Llanidloes Town
Holyhead Hotspur	6–2	Llansantffraid
Holywell Town	3–1	Denbigh Town
Llandudno Junction	4–2	Mold Alexandra
Llanllyfni	0–4	Greenfield
Llanrhaeadr	2–1	Glan Conwy
Llanuwchllyn	3–6 (a.e.t.)	Buckley Town
Porthmadog	2–3	Llandudno
Rhyl	7–0	Bodedern Athletic
Venture Community	2–5 (a.e.t.)	Montgomery Town
Waterloo Rovers	5–1	Rhydymwyn

=== South ===
Team 1	Score	Team 2
Aberbargoed Buds	2–1	Treforest
Ammanford	1–2	Chepstow Town
Brecon Corinthians	2–5	Haverfordwest County
Bridgend Town	0–1	Pontardawe Town
Caerau	8–0	Llantwit Fardre
Caerleon	2–5	Barry Town
Cardiff Grange Harlequins	4–3	Llanwern
Croesyceiliog	3–7	Caerau (Ely)
Cwmamman United	1–5	Newbridge-on-Wye
Cwmbran Celtic	0–1	Cambrian & Clydach Vale
Dinas Powys	1–3	Ton Pentre
Ely Rangers	3–1	Bryntirion Athletic
Goytre	3–0	Llwydcoed
Goytre United	6–0	Pontyclun
Monmouth Town	0–0 (6–5 pen.)	Porth
Pontypridd Town	0–0 (0–3 pen.)	Aberdare Town
Presteigne St Andrews	0–2	Penrhyncoch
Rhayader Town	2–0	Risca United
Tata Steel	7–4	Bridgend Street
West End	4–0	Taff's Well

== Round two ==
Round Two was played on either Saturday 10 or Sunday 11 November 2012.

=== North ===
Team 1	Score	Team 2
Brymbo	1–3	Cefn Druids
Conwy Borough	1–1 (4–3 pen.)	Buckley Town
Corwen	1–2 (a.e.t.)	Gwalchmai
Flint Town United	3–0	Greenfield
Holyhead Hotspur	5–2	Pwllheli
Holywell Town	5–3 (a.e.t.)	Llandudno
Llanidloes Town	3–2	Caersws
Llanrhaeadr	2–3	Llanrug United
Montgomery Town	1–3	Llandudno Junction
Waterloo Rovers	0–5	Rhyl

=== South ===
Team 1	Score	Team 2
Aberdare Town	2–1	Tata Steel
Caerau	1–3	Goytre
Cambrian & Clydach Vale	0–1	Haverfordwest County
Chepstow Town	4–1	Cardiff Grange Harlequins
Ely Rangers	6–1	Aberbargoed Buds
Goytre United	2–4	Caerau (Ely)
Newbridge-on-Wye	1–5	Monmouth Town
Penrhyncoch	1–2	Barry Town
Pontardawe Town	2–0	Ton Pentre
West End	2–0	Rhayader Town

== Round three ==
Round Three will be played on either Saturday 8 or Sunday 9 December 2012.

Team 1	Score	Team 2
Aberystwyth Town	2–5	Rhyl
Afan Lido	3–4	Prestatyn Town
Airbus UK	3–0	Port Talbot Town
Bangor City	4–1	Aberdare Town
Barry Town	3–1 (a.e.t.)	Ely Rangers
Flint Town United	1–0	Llanidloes Town
Gap Connah's Quay	4–2	Llanelli
Gwalchmai	0–2	Chepstow Town
Holyhead Hotspur	1–2	Carmarthen Town
Holywell Town	0–2	Caerau (Ely)
Llandudno Junction	2–3	Haverfordwest County
Llanrug United	0–5	West End
Monmouth Town	2–3	Bala Town
Newtown	2–0	Cefn Druids
Goytre	0–2	Pontardawe Town
The New Saints	3–1 (a.e.t.)	Conwy Borough

== Round four ==
Round Four will be played on either Saturday 26th or Sunday 27 January 2013.

Team 1	Score	Team 2
Barry Town	2–1	Pontardawe Town
Carmarthen Town	3–2 (a.e.t.)	Bala Town
Chepstow Town	3–4	Haverfordwest County
Flint Town United	3–1	Caerau (Ely)
Gap Connah's Quay	0–2	Bangor City
Newtown	1–1 (4–5 pen.)	Airbus UK
Prestatyn Town	2–0	West End
The New Saints	5–1	Rhyl

== Quarter-finals ==
The Quarter-finals were played on 1 and 2 March 2013.

Team 1	Score	Team 2
Bangor City	1–0	Airbus UK
Carmarthen Town	2–3 (a.e.t.)	Prestatyn Town
Flint Town United	0–2	Barry Town
Haverfordwest County	0–1	The New Saints

== Semi-finals ==
The Semi-finals were played on 6 April 2013.

Team 1	Score	Team 2
Bangor City	1–0	The New Saints
Barry Town	1–2	Prestatyn Town

6 May 2013
15:00 BST

Bangor City	1–3 (a.e.t.)	Prestatyn Town
Simm 60'	Report	A. Barrett 2', 111'; A. Barrett PEN 103'

Racecourse Ground, Wrexham
Attendance: 1,732
Referee: Kevin Morgan (Cardiff)
