= 2004–05 Welsh Cup =

Tournament details
- Country: Wales

Final positions
- Champions: Total Network Solutions
- Runners-up: Carmarthen Town

The 2004–05 FAW Welsh Cup was the 118th edition of the Welsh Cup, the national football cup competition of Wales. Total Network Solutions won the tournament, beating Carmarthen Town 1–0 in the final.

== First round ==
Home team	Score	Away team
Ammanford	0–9	Goytre United
Bala Town	5–2 (a.e.t.)	Conwy United
Barry Town	3–0	Gwynfi United
Blaenrhondda	3–2	Ystradgynlais
Bodedern	5–0	Brynteg Village
Bridgend Town	2–0	Neath
Caldicot Town	2–2 (5–4 p)	Croesyceiliog
Cardiff Corinthians	3–2	Maesteg Park Athletic
Carmarthen Town	7–2	Bryntirion Athletic
Carno	3–2	Caerwys
Cefn United	1–2	Denbigh Town
Chirk AAA	2–4 (a.e.t.)	Gresford Athletic
Corwen	0–5	Ruthin Town
Dinas Powys	6–0	AFC Porth
Garden Village Youth	w/o	Llanrug United
Glan Conwy	1–3	Penmaenmawr Phoenix
Goytre	0–3	Caerau (Ely)
Cardiff Grange Harlequins	7–0	Morriston Town
Guilsfield	w/o	Sealand Leisure
Halkyn United	2–0	Flint Town United
Holyhead Hotspur	4–0	Cemaes Bay
Holywell Town	1–0	Mold Alexandra
Lex XI	5–4	Llanberis
Llandudno Junction	w/o	Amlwch Town
Llandudno Town	1–0	Llanfyllin Town
Llangollen Town	4–1	Rhostyllen United
Llanidloes Town	0–10	Llangefni Town
Llanrhaeadr	2–1	Llandyrnog United
Llantwit Fardre	0–1	Garden Village
Meifod	1–8	Glantraeth
Newport YMCA	1–2	Briton Ferry Athletic
Penrhiwceiber Rangers	1–2	AFC Llwydcoed
Penrhiwfer	4–2 (a.e.t.)	Llanwern
Penycae	1–3	Penrhyncoch
Pontyclun	3–1	Newcastle Emlyn
Pontypridd Town	0–1	Llanelli
Porthcawl Town	0–3	Bettws
Prestatyn Town	1–4	Airbus UK
Rhayader Town	1–0	Rhos Aelwyd
Rhydymwyn	4–2	Llanfairpwll
Risca & Gelli United	2–0	ENTO Aberaman Athletic
Skewen Athletic	6–0	Garw Athletic
Summerhill United	1–2	Buckley Town
Taffs Well	7–0	Cwmamman United
Ton Pentre	2–1	Ely Rangers
Tredegar Town	0–1	Caerleon
Troedyrhiw	1–0	Fields Park Pontllanfraith
UWIC Inter Cardiff	1–0	Treowen Stars
Y Felinheli	1–3	Mynydd Isa

== Second round ==
Home team	Score	Away team
Briton Ferry Athletic	1–2	Garden Village
Afan Lido	1–0	Caldicot Town
Airbus UK	2–1	Rhydymwyn
Bala Town	3–0	Denbigh Town
Barry Town	3–0	Blaenrhondda
Bettws	0–2	Aberystwyth Town
Bodedern	3–1	Carno
Buckley Town	1–1 (7–8 p)	Gresford Athletic
Caerau (Ely)	0–2	Penrhiwfer
Caerleon	3–3 (5–4 p)	Taffs Well
Caersws	5–1	Ruthin Town
Carmarthen Town	3–0	Bridgend Town
Dinas Powys	2–1	Risca & Gelli United
Glantraeth	2–0	NEWI Cefn Druids
Goytre United	0–1	AFC Llwydcoed
Llandudno	1–3	Rhyl
Llandudno Junction	1–5	Welshpool Town
Llanelli	2–3	Cwmbran Town
Llangefni Town	3–1	Guilsfield
Llangollen Town	0–8	Caernarfon Town
Llanrhaeadr	1–5	Lex XI
Llanrug United	2–3	Halkyn United
Mynydd Isa	1–2	Holywell Town
Newtown	0–1	Porthmadog
Penmaenmawr Phoenix	0–2	Bangor City
Penrhyncoch	2–2 (3–4 p)	Holyhead Hotspur
Rhayader Town	2–4	Port Talbot Town
Skewen Athletic	0–2	Cardiff Grange Harlequins
Ton Pentre	2–0	Cardiff Corinthians
Total Network Solutions	5–0	Connah's Quay Nomads
Troedyrhiw	2–3	Haverfordwest County
UWIC Inter Cardiff	4–3	Pontyclun

== Third round ==
Home team	Score	Away team
AFC Llwydcoed	1–2	Welshpool Town
Airbus UK	0–2	Afan Lido
Bala Town	5–3 (a.e.t.)	Ton Pentre
Barry Town	2–1	Garden Village
Caernarfon Town	2–1 (a.e.t.)	Cardiff Grange Harlequins
Dinas Powys	2–3	Bangor City
Gresford Athletic	3–6 (a.e.t.)	Carmarthen Town
Haverfordwest County	3–0	Glantraeth
Holywell Town	w/o	Aberystwyth Town
Lex XI	0–1	Caersws
Llangefni Town	1–0	Bodedern
Porthmadog	1–3 (a.e.t.)	Cwmbrân Town
Port Talbot Town	0–1	Halkyn United
Rhyl	9–0	Holyhead Hotspur
Total Network Solutions	11–0	Penrhiwfer
UWIC Inter Cardiff	3–1	Caerleon

== Fourth round ==
Home team	Score	Away team
Aberystwyth Town	3–2 (a.e.t.)	Caernarfon Town
Barry	2–5	Afan Lido
Carmarthen Town	1–0	Cwmbrân Town
Halkyn United	0–4	Caersws
Rhyl	4–0	Llangefni Town
Total Network Solutions	2–1	Bangor City
UWIC Inter Cardiff	1–4	Haverfordwest
Welshpool	1–2	Bala

== Quarter-finals ==
Home team	Score	Away team
Aberystwyth Town	0–2	Haverfordwest County
Caersws	0–1	Carmarthen Town
Rhyl	4–1	Bala Town
Total Network Solutions	4–1	Afan Lido

== Semi-finals ==
2 April 2004

Carmarthen Town	1–0	Haverfordwest County

Stebonheath Park, Llanelli
3 April 2004

Total Network Solutions	3–1	Rhyl

Racecourse Ground, Wrexham

== Final ==
8 May 2005

Carmarthen Town	0–1	Total Network Solutions
		Lawless 75'

Stebonheath Park, Llanelli
Attendance: 1,126
Referee: S. Jones
