= 2005–06 Welsh Cup =

Tournament details
- Country: Wales

Final positions
- Champions: Rhyl
- Runners-up: Bangor City

The 2005–06 FAW Welsh Cup was the 119th edition of the Welsh Cup, the national football cup competition of Wales. Rhyl won the competition after beating Bangor City 2–0 in the final.

== First round ==
Home team	Score	Away team
Afan Lido	0–3	West End
AFC Llwydcoed	5–0	Blaenrhondda
AFC Porth	0–1	Pontyclun
Bethesda Athletic	1–5	Mynydd Isa
Bridgend Town	1–4	UWIC
Briton Ferry Athletic	5–2	Llantwit Fardre
Buckley Town	4–2	Flint Town United
Caerleon	5–6 (a.e.t.)	Bettws
Caerwys	0–2	Llanrwst United
Caldicot Town	4–0	Porthcawl Town
Cefn United	0–2	Connah's Quay Nomads
Chirk AAA	3–2	Brynteg Village
Coedpoeth United	0–3	Caernarfon Town
Conwy United	w/o	Y Felinheli (withdrew)
Corwen	0–6	Glantraeth
Croesyceiliog	2–1	Garden Village
Cwmbran Celtic	2–4	Ystradgynlais
Denbigh Town	1–4	Prestatyn Town
Dinas Powys	0–2	Port Talbot Town
Ely Rangers	4–2 (a.e.t.)	Cambrian & Clydach Vale
ENTO Aberaman Athletic	2–0	Barry Town
Garw Athletic	0–3	Taffs Well
Glan Conwy	0–3	Bala Town
Goytre United	7–1	Llanwern
Cardiff Grange Harlequins	2–0 (a.e.t.)	Penrhiwceiber Rangers
Gresford Athletic	2–1	Bodedern
Hawarden Rangers	2–3	Mold Alexandra
Holywell Town	0–1	NEWI Cefn Druids
Knighton Town	0–4	Penrhyncoch
Llandudno Junction	0–3	Airbus UK
Llandyrnog United	3–2	Llanrhaeadr
Llanfairpwll	1–3	Llangefni Town
Llanfyllin Town	2–1	Carno
Llangollen Town	0–2	Llanberis
Llanidloes Town	0–7	Guilsfield
Llanrug United	2–6	Llandudno
Maesteg Park Athletic	7–0	Ammanford
Morriston Town	0–1	Bryntirion Athletic
Neath Athletic	0–1	Llanelli
Nefyn United	1–0	Halkyn United
Newcastle Emlyn	1–6	Cardiff Corinthians
Newport YMCA	2–1	Caerau (Ely)
Penmaenmawr Phoenix	1–1 (a.e.t.) (4–5 p)	Summerhill Brymbo
Penrhiwfer	2–4	Risca United
Pontypridd Town	3–2	Pontardawe Town
Presteigne St Andrews	w/o	Meifod (disqualified)
Rhayader Town	5–1	Four Crosses
Rhydymwyn	0–6	Holyhead Hotspur
Ruthin Town	3–4	Lex XI
Sealand Rovers	3–2	Rhos Aelwyd
Tredegar Town	0–4	Ton Pentre
Treharris Athletic	4–2	Goytre AFC
Troedyrhiw	3–0 (a.e.t.)	Treowen Stars

== Second round ==
Home team	Score	Away team
Aberystwyth Town	2–0	Bettws
Airbus UK	4–1	Conwy United
Bala Town	3–2 (a.e.t.)	Penrhyncoch
Bangor City	4–0	Llanberis
Caersws	5–3	Cardiff Grange Harlequins
Caldicot Town	1–3	Cwmbran Town
Cardiff Corinthians	0–11	Carmarthen Town
Chirk AAA	1–2	Nefyn United
Croesyceiliog	3–2	West End
ENTO Aberaman Athletic	0–1	Briton Ferry Athletic
Glantraeth	6–1	Guilsfield
Gresford Athletic	1–2	Porthmadog
Haverfordwest County	1–2	Goytre United
Holyhead Hotspur	1–3	Caernarfon Town
Lex XI	4–2	Connah's Quay Nomads
Llanelli	8–2	Risca United
Llanfyllin Town	1–3	Buckley Town
Llanrwst United	3–2	Llandudno
Mold Alexandra	4–3	Mynydd Isa
Newtown	5–1	Llandyrnog United
Pontyclun	2–1 (a.e.t.)	Maesteg Park Athletic
Pontypridd Town	2–2 (a.e.t.) (7–6 p)	Ton Pentre
Port Talbot Town	3–2	Newport YMCA
Presteigne St Andrews	2–4 (a.e.t.)	Prestatyn Town
Rhayader Town	2–4	Llangefni Town
Rhyl	4–0	Sealand Rovers
Summerhill Brymbo	2–3 (a.e.t.)	NEWI Cefn Druids
Total Network Solutions	4–1	Welshpool Town
Treharris Athletic	1–3	Ely Rangers
Troedyrhiw	3–2 (a.e.t.)	Taffs Well
UWIC	2–1	AFC Llwydcoed
Ystradgynlais	2–3	Bryntirion Athletic

== Third round ==
Home team	Score	Away team
Bala Town	4–3 (a.e.t.)	Buckley Town
Bangor City	4–2	Airbus UK
Caersws	3–1	Croesyceiliog
Carmarthen Town	4–0	Briton Ferry Athletic
Ely Rangers	1–4	Cwmbran Town
Glantraeth	2–5	Rhyl
Goytre United	6–3	Troedyrhiw
Llangefni Town	3–0	Llanrwst United
Mold Alexandra	0–5	Prestatyn Town
NEWI Cefn Druids	3–1	Nefyn United
Newtown	6–0	Pontyclun
Pontypridd Town	1–0 (a.e.t.)	Aberystwyth Town
Port Talbot Town	3–0	Bryntirion Athletic
Porthmadog	0–3	Caernarfon Town
Total Network Solutions	4–0	Lex XI
UWIC	1–3	Llanelli

== Fourth round ==
Home team	Score	Away team
Bangor City	2–1	Newtown
Caernarfon Town	4–0	Bala Town
Caersws	1–3	Llangefni Town
Cwmbran Town	1–3	Port Talbot Town
Llanelli	1–0	Total Network Solutions
NEWI Cefn Druids	3–5	Rhyl
Pontypridd Town	0–5	Goytre United
Prestatyn Town	1–2	Carmarthen Town

== Quarter-finals ==
Home team	Score	Away team
Bangor City	1–0	Carmarthen Town
Llanelli	3–0	Caernarfon Town
Port Talbot Town	3–0	Llangefni Town
Rhyl	5–2	Goytre United

== Semi-finals ==
Home team	Score	Away team
Llanelli	0–1	Bangor City
Rhyl	2–2 (a.e.t.) (5–4 p)	Port Talbot Town

== Final ==
7 May 2006

Bangor City	0–2	Rhyl
		Moran 47' (pen.); Wilson 78'

Racecourse Ground, Wrexham
Attendance: 1,743
Referee: Mark Whitby
