= 2013–14 Welsh Cup =

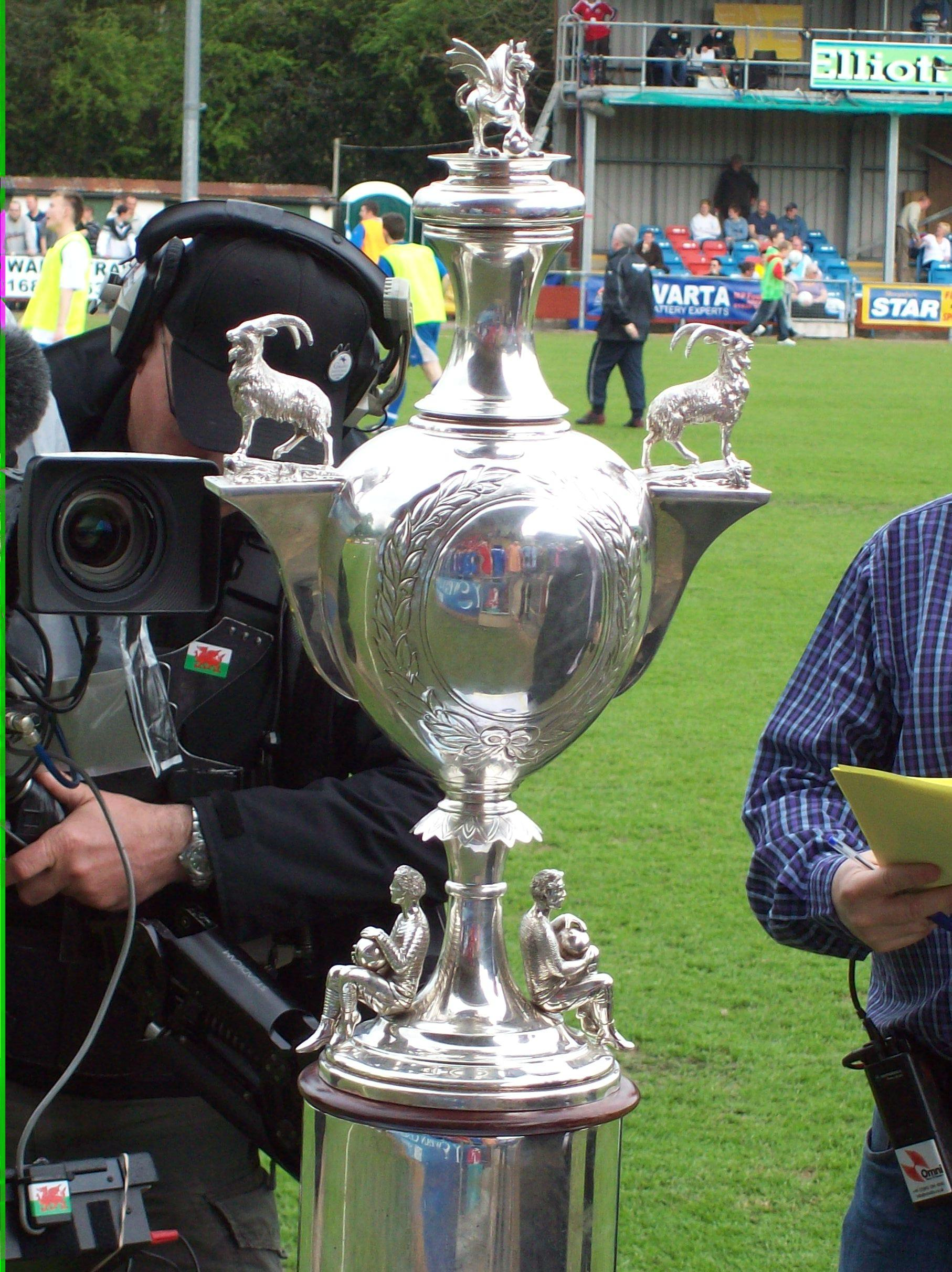
- The Welsh Cup

Tournament details
- Country: Wales
- Teams: 191

Final positions
- Champions: The New Saints
- Runners-up: Aberystwyth Town

The 2013–14 FAW Welsh Cup was the 127th season of the annual knockout tournament for competitive football teams in Wales. The tournament commenced on 16 August 2013, and ran until the final in May 2014. The final itself featured Aberystwyth Town for the fourth time, the last being in 2009, and The New Saints for the seventh time, the last being in 2012. They had never faced each other in a final before. The final was won 3−2 by The New Saints, who made the Double and qualified to the first qualifying round of the 2014–15 UEFA Europa League. Aberystwyth Town qualified to the first qualifying round of the 2014–15 UEFA Europa League as the cup runner-up.

== Qualifying round one ==
Qualifying round one was played on either Saturday 17 or Sunday 18 August 2013.

Team 1	Score	Team 2
Aber Valley (5)	0−5	Cardiff Grange Harlequins (4)
Barry Town (4)	8−0	Treforest (5)
Bettws (4)	0−4	Rhoose (4)
Blaenrhondda (6)	0−5	Treharris Athletic Western (4)
Brecon Corinthians (5)	3−1	Cardiff Corinthians (3)
Brickfield Rangers (3)	w/o	New Brighton Villa (4)
Butetown (5)	3−1	Aberfan (6)
Chepstow Town (3)	3−0	Clwb Cymric (5)
Cwmbrân Town (5)	2−3	Cardiff Metropolitan University (3)
Dafen Welfare (5)	1−8	Sully Sports (5)
Ely Rangers (3)	8−0	Sporting Marvels (6)
Ely Valley (7)	0−6	Pontypridd Town (4)
Garw (6)	7−1	Kenfig Hill (5)
Greenfield (4)	w/o	Connah's Quay Town (4)
Kinmel Bay Sports (4)	3−4	St Asaph City (4)
Lex XI (4)	2−2 (4−2p)	Castell Alun Colts (4)
Llandrindod Wells (3)	5−0	Newbridge-on-Wye (4)
Llandudno Junction (3)	7−2	Gaerwen (4)
Llandyrnog United (3)	1−3	Llanuwchllyn (4)
Llanfair United (3)	9−1	Kerry (4)
Llangefni Town (6)	1−2	Blaenau Ffestiniog Amateur (4)
Llanharry (6)	2−2 (2−4p)	Canton Rangers (7)
Llanllyfni (5)	w/o	Bethel (5)
Llannerch-y-medd (5)	4−1 (a.e.t.)	Amlwch Town (4)
Llantwit Fardre (5)	0−1	Bridgend Street (4)
Llantwit Major (4)	3−1	Penrhiwfer (6)

Team 1	Score	Team 2
Llanystumdwy (5)	3−4	Penmaenmawr Phoenix (4)
Lliswerry (4)	2−3	Fairfield United (5)
Llwydcoed (3)	10−0	Carnetown (6)
Machynlleth (4)	6−3	Hay St Marys (4)
Meliden (4)	0−2	Nantlle Vale (4)
Merthyr Saints (5)	8−1	Cwmaman Institute (4)
Nefyn United (3)	4−3	Trearddur Bay United (4)
Nelson Cavaliers (7)	1−2	Cardiff Hibernian (5)
FC Nomads of Connah's Quay (4)	3−2	Halkyn United (4)
Newcastle Emlyn (4)	4−1	Llanelli Town (4)
Penrhyndeudraeth (4)	3−1	Llanfairpwll (3)
Penygraig United (7)	2−1	Pontyclun (5)
Pontlottyn (5)	1−5	Newport Civil Service (4)
Presteigne St Andrews (4)	7−0	Llanfyllin Town (5)
Rhos Aelwyd (3)	9−1	Llay Miners Welfare (3)
Risca United (4)	1−4	Llanwern (4)
Rumney Juniors (7)	3−2	Tonyrefail (7)
Splott Albion (5)	3−0 (a.e.t.)	Ebbw Vale (6)
Tredegar Athletic (6)	1−3	Cefn Fforest (6)
Tredegar Town (4)	0−1	Trelewis Welfare (5)
Trefelin (5)	3−1	Porthcawl Town Athletic (5)
Treowen Stars (4)	3−2	Penrhiwceiber CA (6)
Trethomas Bluebirds (5)	6−0	Graig-y-Rhacca (8)
Venture Community (4)	2−5	Caerwys (5)
Ynysddu Welfare (6)	3−2	Abertillery Bluebirds (4)

== Qualifying round two ==
Qualifying round two was played on either Saturday 14 or Sunday 15 September 2013.

Team 1	Score	Team 2
Aberaeron (3)	3−0	Bow Street (3)
Butetown (5)	2−1	Cardiff Grange Harlequins (4)
Brecon Corinthians (5)	1−4	Cardiff Metropolitan University (3)
Brickfield Rangers (3)	3−1	Llandudno Junction (3)
Brymbo (3)	0−4	Chirk AAA (3)
Builth Wells (3)	3−7	Llanfair United (3)
Caerau (3)	0−11	Trefelin (5)
Caerleon (3)	1−5	Briton Ferry Llansawel (3)
Caldicot Town (3)	5−0	Newport YMCA (3)
Canton Rangers (7)	0−6	Cardiff Hibernian (5)
Carno (3)	1−2	Barmouth & Dyffryn United (3)
Corwen (3)	0−1	Caerwys (5)
Croesyceiliog (3)	0−1	Splott Albion (5)
Fairfield United (5)	8−4	Cefn Fforest (6)
Garden Village (3)	4−3 (a.e.t.)	Ammanford (3)
Greenfield (4)	1−3	Mold Alexandra (3)
Gresford Athletic (3)	2−2 (2−4p)	Coedpoeth United (3)
Holywell Town (3)	8−1	Llannerch-y-medd (5)
Lex XI (4)	0−1	Denbigh Town (3)
Llanberis (3)	3−2	Hawarden Rangers (3)
Llandrindod Wells (3)	5−3	Waterloo Rovers (3)
Llanllyfni (5)	0−6	Llangollen Town (3)
Llanrug United (3)	5−0	St Asaph City (4)
Llanrwst United (3)	4−2	Llanuwchllyn (4)

Team 1	Score	Team 2
Llansantffraid (3)	1−5	Berriew (3)
Llantwit Major (4)	6−2	Trelewis Welfare (5)
Llanwern (4)	2−3	Treowen Stars (4)
Llwydcoed (3)	2−1	Penrhiwceiber Rangers (3)
Machynlleth (4)	3−0	Montgomery Town (3)
Nefyn United (3)	7−3	Blaenau Ffestiniog Amateur (4)
Newcastle Emlyn (4)	1−0	Ely Rangers (3)
Newport Civil Service (4)	3−2	Garw (6)
FC Nomads of Connah's Quay(4)	3−0	Penmaenmawr Phoenix (4)
Overton Recreation (3)	1−3	Gwalchmai (3)
Penyffordd (3)	3−4	Glan Conwy (3)
Penygraig United (7)	2−4	Sully Sports (5)
Pontypridd Town (4)	1−1 (1−4p)	Bridgend Street (4)
Presteigne St Andrews (4)	3−2	Four Crosses (3)
Pwllheli (3)	3−1	Nantlle Vale (4)
Rhoose (4)	5−1	Merthyr Saints (5)
Rhos Aelwyd (3)	w/o	Bodedern Athletic (3)
Rumney Juniors (7)	0−3	Barry Town (4)
Ruthin Town (3)	1−3	Glantraeth (3)
Saltney Town (3)	1−3	Penrhyndeudraeth (4)
Treharris Athletic Western (4)	2−1	Dinas Powys (3)
Undy Athletic (3)	2−1	Trethomas Bluebirds (5)
Welshpool Town (3)	w/o	Tywyn & Bryncrug (3)
Ynysddu Welfare (6)	0−3	Chepstow Town (3)

== Round one ==
Round One was played on Saturday 12 October 2013.

Team 1	Score	Team 2
AFC Porth (2)	1−2	Monmouth Town (2)
Barry Town (4)	1−0	Taff's Well (2)
Bridgend Street (4)	1−3	Tata Steel (2)
Briton Ferry Llansawel (3)	3−1 (a.e.t.)	Aberbargoed Buds (2)
Caerau Ely (2)	4−0	Cardiff Hibernian (5)
Caldicot Town (3)	2−1	Splott Albion (5)
Cambrian & Clydach Vale (2)	4−0	Butetown (5)
Cardiff Metropolitan University (3)	4−1	Aberaeron (3)
Cwmbran Celtic (2)	0−1	Pen-y-Bont (2)
Garden Village (3)	1−2	Rhoose (4)
Goytre (Monmouthshire) (2)	1−2	Pontardawe Town (2)
Goytre United (2)	3−1	Trefelin (5)
Llandrindod Wells (3)	3−0	Newport Civil Service (4)
Llantwit Major (4)	2−3	Treharris Athletic Western (4)
Newcastle Emlyn (4)	1−2 (a.e.t.)	Chepstow Town (3)
Sully Sports (5)	3−1	Llwydcoed (3)
Ton Pentre (2)	3−0	Fairfield United (5)
Treowen Stars (4)	2−4	Aberdare Town (2)
Undy Athletic (3)	5−2	Presteigne St Andrews (4)
West End (2)	2−3	Haverfordwest County (2)

Team 1	Score	Team 2
Bodedern Athletic (3)	3−2 (a.e.t.)	Glantraeth (3)
Caernarfon Town (2)	4−1	Llanrug United (3)
Caersws (2)	2−0	Denbigh Town (3)
FC Nomads of Connah's Quay (4)	3−0	Pwllheli (3)
Coedpoeth United (3)	2−6	Barmouth & Dyffryn United (3)
Flint Town United (2)	3−1	Llanberis (3)
Glan Conwy (3)	1−3	Llanidloes Town (2)
Guilsfield (2)	6−1 (a.e.t.)	Machynlleth (4)
Holyhead Hotspur (2)	0−3	Cefn Druids (2)
Holywell Town (3)	3−0	Penrhyncoch (2)
Llandudno (2)	5−1	Llanrhaeadr (2)
Llanfair United (3)	3−2	Gwalchmai (3)
Llangollen Town (3)	0−2	Buckley Town (2)
Llanrwst United (3)	3−4	Conwy Borough (2)
Nefyn United (3)	2−1	Penrhyndeudraeth (4)
Penycae (2)	7−4 (a.e.t.)	Brickfield Rangers (3)
Porthmadog (2)	1−0	Mold Alexandra (3)
Rhayader Town (2)	1−0	Chirk AAA (3)
Rhydymwyn (2)	2−1	Caerwys (5)
Tywyn & Bryncrug (3)	2−2 (5−4 p)	Berriew (3)

== Round two ==
Round Two was played on Saturday 9 November 2013.

Team 1	Score	Team 2
Barry Town (4)	4−3 (a.e.t.)	Undy Athletic (3)
Briton Ferry Llansawel (3)	2−3	Aberdare Town (2)
Caldicot Town (3)	3−0	Pen-y-Bont (2)
Cambrian & Clydach Vale (2)	2−0	Pontardawe Town (2)
Cardiff Metropolitan University (3)	6−1	Haverfordwest County (2)
Goytre United (2)	0−1	Chepstow Town (3)
Llandrindod Wells (3)	3−3 (4–3 p)	Caerau Ely (2)
Rhoose (4)	1−0	Tata Steel (2)
Ton Pentre (2)	0−1	Sully Sports (5)
Treharris Athletic Western (4)	1−7	Monmouth Town (2)

Team 1	Score	Team 2
Barmouth & Dyffryn United (3)	1−3	Cefn Druids (2)
Bodedern Athletic (3)	5−1	Tywyn & Bryncrug (3)
Buckley Town (2)	1−0	Rhayader Town (2)
Caernarfon Town (2)	1−2	Porthmadog (2)
Conwy Borough (2)	3−2	Flint Town United (2)
Holywell Town (3)	3−0	Penycae (2)
Llanfair United (3)	2−1	Guilsfield (2)
Llanidloes Town (2)	2−0	Llandudno (2)
Nefyn United (3)	1−3 (a.e.t.)	Caersws (2)
Rhydymwyn (2)	4−1	FC Nomads of Connah's Quay (4)

== Round three ==
Round Three was played on Saturday 7 December 2013.

Team 1	Score	Team 2
Aberdare Town (2)	4−2	Prestatyn Town (1)
Afan Lido (1)	2−0	Rhydymwyn (2)
Bodedern Athletic (3)	2−0 (a.e.t.)	Buckley Town (2)
Caersws (2)	2−1 (a.e.t.)	Gap Connah's Quay (1)
Conwy Borough (2)	1−2 (a.e.t.)	The New Saints (1)
Pen-y-Bont (2)	0−2	Airbus UK Broughton (1)
Cambrian & Clydach Vale (2)	3−1	Chepstow Town (3)
Carmarthen Town (1)	2−1	Port Talbot Town (1)
Cefn Druids (2)	5−2	Barry Town (4)
Llandrindod Wells (3)	1−3	Holywell Town (3)
Llanfair United (3)	2−4	Aberystwyth Town (1)
Monmouth Town (2)	2−1	Llanidloes Town (2)
Newtown (1)	2−1	Cardiff Metropolitan University (3)
Porthmadog (2)	2−1	Sully Sports (5)
Rhoose (4)	1−6	Bala Town (1)
Rhyl (1)	1−2	Bangor City (1)

22 November 2013 - Caldicot Town (3) withdrawn from the competition for fielding an un-registered player in Round 2.

== Round Four ==
Round Four was played on either Saturday 1 or Sunday 2 February 2014.

Team 1	Score	Team 2
Aberdare Town (2)	4−1	Bodedern Athletic (3)
Aberystwyth Town (1)	5−1	Afan Lido (1)
Cefn Druids (2)	0–5	Bala Town (1)
Airbus UK Broughton (1)	2–0	Bangor City (1)
Caersws (2)	4−3 (a.e.t.)	Cambrian & Clydach Vale (2)
Holywell Town (3)	3−2	Newtown (1)
Porthmadog (2)	3−2 (a.e.t.)	Monmouth Town (2)
The New Saints (1)	2−0	Carmarthen Town (1)

== Quarter-finals ==
The Quarter-finals were played on 1 March 2014.

1 March 2014	Aberdare Town (2)	1–2	Bala Town (1)	Aberaman Park, Aberdare
14:00	Small 61'		Connolly 28', 80'

1 March 2014	Aberystwyth Town (1)	2–1	Caersws (2)	Park Avenue, Aberystwyth
14:30	Venables 13' (pen.); Kellaway 47'		Jenkins 11'

1 March 2014	Holywell Town (3)	2–1	Porthmadog (2)	Halkyn Road, Holywell
14:30	Jones 35'; Lloyd 88'		Newell 44'

1 March 2014	The New Saints (1)	2–0	Airbus UK Broughton (1)	Park Hall, Oswestry
15:00	Wilde 80'; Finley 90'

== Semi-finals ==
The Semi-finals were played on 5 April 2014.

5 April 2014	The New Saints (1)	2−1	Bala Town (1)	The Airfield, Broughton
15:30	M. Williams 19'; J. Mullan 35'		C. Murtagh 28'	Attendance: 302

5 April 2014	Aberystwyth Town (1)	3−1	Holywell Town (3)	Latham Park, Newtown
16:15	C. Williams 44'; C. Venables 82'; G. Kellaway 89'		G. Williams 13'	Attendance: 890; Referee: Mark Whitby

== Final ==
3 May 2014	The New Saints (1)	3−2	Aberystwyth Town (1)	Racecourse Ground, Wrexham
15:00	Draper 74' (pen.), 79'; Wilde 87'	Report	Venables 13', 15' (pen.)	Attendance: 1,273; Referee: Brian James
