= 2011–12 Welsh Football League Division Three =

MacWhirter Welsh League Division Three
- Season: 2011–12
- Champions: Undy Athletic
- Promoted: Briton Ferry Llansawel; Goytre; Undy Athletic
- Relegated: AFC Llwydcoed; Pontyclun
- Matches played: 210
- Goals scored: 776 (3.7 per match)
- Biggest home win: Bridgend Street 6–0 Treowen Stars; 19 November 2011; Briton Ferry Llansawel 7–1 Treowen Stars; 17 December 2011; Pontypridd Town 6–0 Newport Civil Service; 18 February 2012; Cardiff Grange Harlequins 6–0 Risca United; 27 March 2012
- Biggest away win: AFC Llwydcoed 0–4 Pontypridd Town; 17 August 2011; Pontyclun 1–5 Undy Athletic; 27 August 2011; Llanwern 2–6 Briton Ferry Llansawel; 1 October 2011; Newport Civil Service 1–5 Pontypridd Town; 29 October 2011; Cardiff Grange Harlequins 1–5 Pontypridd Town; 19 November 2011; Pontyclun 2–6 AFC Llwydcoed; 26 November 2011; Tredegar Town 0–4 Pontypridd Town; 28 January 2012; Pontyclun 0–4 Bridgend Street; 10 March 2012; Tredegar Town 0–4 Risca United; 10 March 2012; Pontyclun 1–5 Pontypridd Town; 7 April 2012; Newport Civil Service 0–4 Briton Ferry Llansawel; 21 April 2012
- Highest scoring: Bridgend Street 8–3 Cardiff Grange Harlequins; 17 August 2011

The 2011–12 Welsh Football League Division Three began on 16 August 2011 and ended on 16 May 2012.

== Team changes from 2010–11 ==
Bridgend Street were promoted from the South Wales Senior League and Undy Athletic were promoted from the Gwent County League.

Cwmamman United were relegated to the Neath & District League. Cwmbrân Town were relegated to the Gwent County League. South Gower were relegated to the Swansea Senior League. Porthcawl Town Athletic were relegated to the South Wales Senior League.

Caerau, Monmouth Town and Tata Steel were promoted to the Welsh Football League Division Two.

AFC Llwydcoed, Abertillery Bluebirds and Llangeinor were relegated from the Welsh Football League Division Two.

Llangeinor withdrew from the league in December.

== League table ==
Pos	Team	Pld	W	D	L	GF	GA	GD	Pts	Promotion or relegation
1	Undy Athletic (C, P)	28	20	3	5	70	32	+38	63	Promoted
2	Goytre (P)	28	19	3	6	65	39	+26	60	Promoted
3	Briton Ferry Llansawel (P)	28	17	7	4	72	39	+33	58	Promoted
4	Bridgend Street	28	16	7	5	73	42	+31	55	
5	Pontypridd Town	28	16	4	8	69	38	+31	52	
6	UWIC	28	13	5	10	49	51	−2	44	
7	Abertillery Bluebirds	28	13	4	11	45	44	+1	43	
8	Risca United	28	12	5	11	58	49	+9	41	
9	Cardiff Grange Harlequins	28	11	3	14	53	58	−5	36	
10	Llanwern	28	7	9	12	44	57	−13	30	
11	Newport Civil Service	28	7	7	14	46	68	−22	28	
12	Tredegar Town	28	5	8	15	31	53	−22	23	
13	Treowen Stars	28	6	5	17	29	70	−41	23	
14	AFC Llwydcoed (R)	28	6	3	19	40	67	−27	21	Relegated
15	Pontyclun (R)	28	2	7	19	32	69	−37	13	Relegated
16	Llangeinor	0	0	0	0	0	0	0	0 (Note: Llangeinor withdrew from the league in December 2011, their record was expunged.)	Club withdrew, record expunged

Updated to match(es) played on 16 May 2012. Source: Welsh Football League
Rules for classification: 1) points; 2) goal difference; 3) number of goals scored.
(C) Champions; (P) Promoted; (R) Relegated

== Results ==
Home \ Away	LLWY	ATB	BRI	BFL	CGH	GOA	LLNG	LLNW	NCS	PYC	PPT	RIS	TRE	TRO	UND	UWIC
AFC Llwydcoed		1–2	1–4	1–3	1–3	0–2		3–0	0–1	1–1	0–4	2–2	3–2	4–1	2–4	1–3
Abertillery Bluebirds	4–2		1–3	2–1	3–1	1–2		4–3	0–0	0–0	2–3	0–2	2–1	2–0	1–3	3–1
Bridgend Street	3–0	0–2		1–1	8–3	2–1		4–4	5–0	4–2	2–2	2–4	1–1	6–0	4–3	1–1
Briton Ferry Llansawel	5–1	1–0	3–1		3–1	2–2		2–2	3–3	2–3	3–2	4–1	2–1	7–1	3–2	0–0
Cardiff Grange Harlequins	2–0	4–0	1–3	0–1		1–4		2–4	4–4	2–1	1–5	6–0	4–0	2–0	0–2	3–1
Goytre	3–0	4–3	3–0	3–2	0–2			2–2	6–1	4–2	4–0	1–0	2–1	2–1	3–1	2–3
Llangeinor																
Llanwern	3–1	0–1	1–2	2–6	1–1	4–2			1–1	2–1	1–3	1–2	0–0	3–1	0–4	1–2
Newport Civil Service	1–2	1–2	1–1	0–4	5–3	3–0		3–0		4–1	1–5	1–4	3–0	1–3	2–2	1–4
Pontyclun	2–6	0–1	0–4	1–1	1–2	1–2		1–1	2–4		1–5	2–3	1–1	0–0	1–5	5–1
Pontypridd Town	3–2	3–2	1–1	1–2	1–2	1–2		0–0	6–0	2–0		2–1	3–2	5–0	1–2	1–2
Risca United	3–0	1–1	1–3	0–1	3–2	1–2		7–2	1–0	4–0	2–2		3–3	3–1	1–2	2–4
Tredegar Town	1–1	2–1	1–3	0–3	3–0	0–2		2–1	1–1	2–0	0–4	0–4		0–0	1–4	1–1
Treowen Stars	1–3	2–2	2–0	3–4	1–1	1–2		0–3	2–1	1–1	0–1	1–0	2–1		2–5	2–0
Undy Athletic	1–0	3–1	1–2	2–0	1–0	2–2		0–0	3–1	3–1	3–0	1–0	2–1	6–1		3–0
UWIC	3–2	0–2	1–3	3–3	2–0	2–1		0–2	3–2	2–1	0–3	3–3	0–3	5–0	2–0	

Updated to match(es) played on 16 May 2012. Source: Welsh Football League
Legend: Blue = home team win; Yellow = draw; Red = away team win.
