= 2010–11 Welsh Football League Division Three =

MacWhirter Welsh League Division Three
- Season: 2010–11
- Champions: Monmouth Town
- Promoted: Monmouth Town; Corus Steel; Caerau
- Relegated: Cwmamman United; South Gower; Cwmbran Town; Porthcawl Town Athletic
- Matches played: 306
- Goals scored: 1,117 (3.65 per match)
- Biggest home win: Caerau 13–0 Treowen Stars; 28 May 2011
- Biggest away win: Cardiff Grange Harlequins 0–6 UWIC; 14 September 2010; Cwmamman United 2–8 Risca United; 10 May 2011; Pontyclun 0–6 Caerau; 14 May 2011
- Highest scoring: Caerau 13–0 Treowen Stars; 28 May 2011

The 2010–11 Welsh Football League Division Three began on 1 September 2010 and ended on 28 May 2011. Monmouth Town won the league by two points.

Caerau claimed third spot on the final day of the season. Requiring an 11-goal victory, they beat Treowen Stars 13–0 to take the final promotion spot on goal difference ahead of Goytre and Pontypridd Town.

== Team changes from 2009–10 ==
Treowen Stars were promoted from the Gwent County League and Caerau were promoted from the South Wales Amateur League.

Seven Sisters were relegated to the Neath & District League. Llantwit Fardre and Troedyrhiw were relegated to the South Wales Amateur League. Garw and Pentwyn Dynamo were relegated to the South Wales Senior League.

Aberbargoed Buds, Abertillery Bluebirds and Cwmaman Institute were promoted to the Welsh Football League Division Two.

Cardiff Grange Harlequins, Cwmbran Town, Llanwern, Porthcawl Town Athletic, Tredegar Town and UWIC were relegated from the Welsh Football League Division Two.

== League table ==
Pos	Team	Pld	W	D	L	GF	GA	GD	Pts
1	Monmouth Town (C, P)	34	19	9	6	96	64	+32	66
2	Corus Steel (P)	34	18	10	6	64	40	+24	64
3	Caerau (P)	34	18	9	7	83	51	+32	63
4	Goytre	34	19	6	9	82	53	+29	63
5	Pontypridd Town	34	19	6	9	73	50	+23	63
6	Newport Civil Service	34	17	6	11	78	54	+24	57
7	Briton Ferry Llansawel	34	17	5	12	68	54	+14	56
8	Risca United	34	16	4	14	74	61	+13	52
9	UWIC	34	14	7	13	59	47	+12	49
10	Treowen Stars	34	13	6	15	48	68	−20	45
11	Cardiff Grange Harlequins	34	10	11	13	57	58	−1	41
12	Pontyclun	34	12	3	19	62	72	−10	39
13	Llanwern	34	9	10	15	56	65	−9	37
14	Tredegar Town	34	9	9	16	46	65	−19	36
15	Cwmamman United (R)	34	10	6	18	51	88	−37	36
16	South Gower (R)	34	8	10	16	51	77	−26	34
17	Cwmbran Town (R)	34	7	11	16	38	59	−21	32
18	Porthcawl Town Athletic (R)	34	4	6	24	31	91	−60	18

Updated to match(es) played on 28 May 2011. Source: Welsh Football League
Rules for classification: 1) points; 2) goal difference; 3) number of goals scored.
(C) Champions; (P) Promoted; (R) Relegated

== Results ==
Home \ Away	BFL	CAE	CGH	COR	CWU	CMT	GOA	LLW	MON	NCS	PYC	PPT	PTA	RIS	SGO	TRE	TRO	UWIC
Briton Ferry Llansawel		1–2	2–0	4–0	4–0	4–1	1–2	4–1	0–4	2–0	1–3	1–2	2–2	4–0	0–0	3–2	4–0	1–2
Caerau	4–1		1–0	0–2	1–1	2–1	2–1	2–2	4–4	3–2	3–0	2–2	4–0	4–3	3–0	1–1	13–0	1–1
Cardiff Grange Harlequins	1–2	2–2		0–1	6–0	4–1	3–0	0–1	3–3	2–5	0–2	1–3	3–1	2–0	2–2	2–4	2–1	0–6
Corus Steel	1–1	0–0	0–0		3–0	3–0	3–0	0–3	2–4	3–1	3–0	0–0	2–2	1–1	3–1	3–1	1–1	1–0
Cwmamman United	0–0	2–1	0–1	3–1		1–1	2–2	3–2	2–3	1–4	3–2	1–5	4–3	2–8	2–1	0–1	2–0	1–2
Cwmbran Town	1–1	0–2	0–1	0–3	1–2		3–1	0–0	1–3	0–1	1–3	1–2	2–0	2–0	2–2	4–1	1–1	1–0
Goytre	1–2	3–3	2–4	7–2	4–2	4–3		4–2	2–3	2–2	1–0	3–1	2–2	3–0	6–0	0–2	2–2	4–0
Llanwern	3–1	2–4	1–1	3–3	1–1	2–2	2–4		1–3	4–1	0–4	3–2	1–1	0–1	2–4	3–1	1–2	1–3
Monmouth Town	3–5	4–1	2–2	1–6	7–3	2–2	2–2	0–0		1–0	2–5	3–1	7–2	2–1	3–1	1–1	3–6	2–2
Newport Civil Service	4–2	3–0	2–2	0–2	3–0	6–0	2–4	1–1	0–1		4–0	3–6	5–1	1–0	2–2	4–2	5–2	1–1
Pontyclun	1–2	0–6	3–2	1–2	4–1	0–3	0–1	1–3	0–4	1–3		1–5	5–0	3–2	1–2	1–2	1–1	3–1
Pontypridd Town	1–2	2–1	2–2	1–2	3–2	1–0	2–0	3–2	4–2	0–2	2–2		2–0	4–1	4–1	1–1	1–0	0–2
Porthcawl Town Athletic	0–2	1–3	1–1	0–5	0–2	0–1	0–2	1–0	0–2	4–2	2–2	1–2		0–5	0–2	2–4	0–2	0–5
Risca United	1–0	4–0	1–1	1–1	3–1	0–0	1–3	4–2	0–1	3–0	4–3	1–3	4–1		3–2	4–3	3–1	4–0
South Gower	4–2	5–2	1–3	0–0	2–1	1–1	0–3	2–2	2–7	1–4	1–0	3–3	1–2	2–4		3–0	2–4	0–3
Tredegar Town	2–4	1–2	1–0	2–3	3–3	1–1	0–1	0–3	0–0	1–3	1–6	0–2	2–0	1–4	0–0		2–0	1–1
Treowen Stars	0–3	0–2	2–1	1–2	5–1	4–0	0–3	1–0	0–5	0–0	2–1	2–0	2–0	3–2	1–1	0–2		0–1
UWIC	6–0	0–2	3–3	1–0	1–2	1–1	0–3	1–2	3–2	0–2	2–3	2–1	1–2	5–1	2–0	0–0	1–2	

Updated to match(es) played on 28 May 2011. Source: Welsh Football League
Legend: Blue = home team win; Yellow = draw; Red = away team win.
