= 2010–11 Welsh Football League Division Two =

MacWhirter Welsh League Division Two
- Season: 2010–11
- Champions: Ton Pentre
- Promoted: Cwmaman Institute; Ton Pentre; AFC Porth
- Relegated: Abertillery Bluebirds; AFC Llwydcoed; Llangeinor
- Matches: 240
- Goals: 845 (3.52 per match)
- Biggest home win: Ton Pentre 7–0 Abertillery Bluebirds; 2 October 2010; Croesyceiliog 8–1 Llangeinor; 20 April 2011; Ton Pentre 7–0 Ely Rangers; 20 April 2011
- Biggest away win: Llangeinor 1–7 Ammanford; 20 November 2010; Llangeinor 1–7 Ton Pentre; 19 February 2011; Llangeinor 2–8 Abertillery Bluebirds; 9 April 2011; Llangeinor 1–7 Cwmaman Institute; 23 April 2011; Llangeinor 0–6 Newport YMCA; 10 May 2011
- Highest scoring: Ton Pentre 8–2 Llangeinor; 30 October 2010; Llangeinor 2–8 Abertillery Bluebirds; 9 April 2011

The 2010–11 Welsh Football League Division Two began on 1 September 2010 and ended on 28 May 2011. Ton Pentre won the league by 13 points.

== Team changes from 2009–10 ==
Caerau (Ely), Cwmbran Celtic and Penrhiwceiber Rangers were promoted to the Welsh Football League Division One.

Bettws, Caerleon, Dinas Powys, Ely Rangers and Ton Pentre were relegated from the Welsh Football League Division One.

Cardiff Grange Harlequins, Cwmbran Town, Llanwern, Porthcawl Town Athletic, Tredegar Town and UWIC were relegated to the Welsh Football League Division Three.

Aberbargoed Buds, Abertillery Bluebirds and Cwmaman Institute were promoted from the Welsh Football League Division Three.

Maesteg Park resigned from the league.

== League table ==
Pos	Team	Pld	W	D	L	GF	GA	GD	Pts
1	Ton Pentre (C, P)	30	22	8	0	98	34	+64	74
2	Cwmaman Institute (P)	30	19	4	7	70	37	+33	61
3	AFC Porth (P)	30	16	7	7	49	35	+14	55
4	Croesyceiliog	30	15	9	6	73	46	+27	54
5	Aberbargoed Buds	30	13	7	10	64	52	+12	46
6	Ely Rangers	30	12	9	9	56	50	+6	45
7	Dinas Powys	30	12	8	10	47	42	+5	44
8	Caerleon	30	12	7	11	44	37	+7	43
9	Newport YMCA	30	12	6	12	55	49	+6	42
10	Bettws	30	12	5	13	38	49	−11	41
11	Newcastle Emlyn	30	10	8	12	54	58	−4	38
12	Ammanford	30	10	6	14	40	50	−10	36
13	Treharris Athletic Western	30	9	6	15	49	55	−6	33
14	Abertillery Bluebirds (R)	30	9	5	16	58	74	−16	32
15	AFC Llwydcoed (R)	30	3	8	19	30	65	−35	17
16	Llangeinor (R)	30	1	3	26	20	112	−92	6

Updated to match(es) played on 28 May 2011. Source: Welsh Football League
Rules for classification: 1) points; 2) goal difference; 3) number of goals scored.
(C) Champions; (P) Promoted; (R) Relegated

== Results ==
Home \ Away	LLW	POR	ABB	ATB	AMM	BET	CAR	CRO	CWI	DIN	ELY	LLN	NEM	NEW	TON	TAW
AFC Llwydcoed		1–2	1–1	1–4	2–4	1–2	0–3	1–2	2–0	3–3	1–1	1–0	2–2	0–1	1–4	1–1
AFC Porth	1–1		1–3	2–1	2–2	4–0	0–0	3–0	2–1	2–1	1–0	5–1	2–1	0–0	0–2	2–1
Aberbargoed Buds	4–0	1–2		2–4	4–1	2–1	2–3	3–5	1–4	1–3	4–1	0–0	3–2	6–2	2–2	0–0
Abertillery Bluebirds	3–2	3–1	3–2		1–2	1–1	1–2	0–2	1–0	0–1	1–1	3–0	4–5	1–5	3–6	2–0
Ammanford	1–1	1–1	2–3	2–1		0–0	1–0	2–0	1–2	0–2	1–1	2–0	0–2	1–0	1–4	0–2
Bettws	3–1	0–1	1–1	5–1	3–0		1–1	1–2	0–3	1–0	1–2	2–0	1–1	1–3	1–2	1–0
Caerleon	2–0	0–1	0–1	0–0	1–2	1–2		2–2	1–1	1–2	1–0	4–0	1–0	2–1	2–3	2–1
Croesyceiliog	3–0	2–0	1–1	5–0	1–2	1–2	2–2		3–2	1–1	4–2	8–1	3–1	3–1	2–2	4–1
Cwmaman Institute	1–0	2–2	5–0	2–1	2–0	0–2	3–0	3–2		2–1	1–1	6–0	3–1	3–0	2–2	2–1
Dinas Powys	2–0	2–0	1–2	3–2	4–0	2–0	2–1	2–2	0–3		3–2	0–0	1–1	1–1	1–2	0–3
Ely Rangers	4–2	2–1	2–2	5–2	2–1	7–1	4–3	1–2	3–0	1–1		5–1	3–1	0–1	1–1	2–2
Llangeinor	1–2	1–3	0–4	2–8	1–7	0–1	0–3	1–3	1–7	1–5	0–0		2–3	0–6	1–7	0–1
Newcastle Emlyn	3–0	3–3	0–4	2–1	3–2	3–0	0–1	2–2	1–2	1–1	3–0	4–1		1–6	0–2	1–2
Newport YMCA	2–1	0–2	0–2	2–2	2–0	2–3	2–1	2–2	1–3	4–0	0–1	3–1	3–3		1–2	2–1
Ton Pentre	4–1	2–1	2–1	7–0	2–1	4–0	2–2	3–3	3–0	3–1	7–0	8–2	1–1	1–1		5–0
Treharris Athletic Western	1–1	1–2	3–2	4–4	1–1	3–1	1–2	2–1	4–5	2–1	1–2	1–2	2–3	5–1	2–3	

Updated to match(es) played on 28 May 2011. Source: Welsh Football League
Legend: Blue = home team win; Yellow = draw; Red = away team win.
