= 2009–10 Welsh Football League Division Two =

MacWhirter Welsh League Division Two
- Season: 2009–10
- Champions: Penrhiwceiber Rangers
- Promoted: Penrhiwceiber Rangers, Cwmbran Celtic, Caerau (Ely)
- Relegated: UWIC Inter Cardiff, Cardiff Bay Harlequins, Cwmbran Town, Llanwern, Tredegar Town, Maesteg Park, Porthcawl Town
- Goals scored: 1,034
- Average goals/game: 3.38
- Biggest home win: Cwmbran Celtic 6–0 Llanwern; 12 December 2009; Ammanford 6–0 Maesteg Park; 27 March 2010; Ammanford 8–2 Porthcawl Town; 8 May 2010
- Biggest away win: Tredegar Town 1–5 Porthcawl Town; 29 August 2009; Cardiff Bay Harlequins 0–4 Penrhiwceiber Rangers; 10 October 2009; Porthcawl Town 0–4 Caerau (Ely); 30 January 2010; Cardiff Bay Harlequins 0–4 Ammanford; 23 February 2010; Porthcawl Town 1–5 AFC Llwydcoed; 27 February 2010; UWIC Inter Cardiff 0–4 Maesteg Park; 27 February 2010
- Highest scoring: Treharris Athletic Western 5–5 Maesteg Park; 17 October 2009; Ammanford 8–2 Porthcawl Town; 8 May 2010

The 2009–10 Welsh Football League Division Two began on 15 August 2009 and ended on 22 May 2010. Penrhiwceiber Rangers won the league by two points.

== Team changes from 2008–09 ==
West End, Ely Rangers and Garden Village were promoted to the Welsh Football League Division One.

Cwmbran Town, Croesyceiliog and Newport YMCA were relegated from the Welsh Football League Division One.

Pentwyn Dynamos, Garw and Pontypridd Town were relegated to the Welsh Football League Division Three.

AFC Llwydcoed, AFC Porth and Porthcawl Town were promoted from the Welsh Football League Division Three.

== League table ==
Pos	Team	Pld	W	D	L	GF	GA	GD	Pts
1	Penrhiwceiber Rangers (C, P)	34	21	8	5	79	53	+26	71
2	Cwmbran Celtic (P)	34	21	6	7	75	33	+42	69
3	Caerau (Ely) (P)	34	18	7	9	82	53	+29	61
4	AFC Llwydcoed	34	17	4	13	74	62	+12	55
5	Ammanford	34	16	6	12	67	47	+20	54
6	Croesyceiliog	34	13	13	8	58	42	+16	52
7	Treharris Athletic Western	34	15	6	13	69	67	+2	51
8	AFC Porth	34	14	7	13	47	49	−2	49
9	Llangeinor	34	15	2	17	47	59	−12	47
10	Newport YMCA	34	11	13	10	54	52	+2	46
11	Newcastle Emlyn	34	13	6	15	54	57	−3	45
12	UWIC (R)	34	11	11	12	57	59	−2	44
13	Cardiff Bay Harlequins (R)	34	11	9	14	52	66	−14	42
14	Cwmbran Town (R)	34	10	7	17	47	62	−15	37
15	Llanwern (R)	34	10	7	17	52	77	−25	37
16	Tredegar Town (R)	34	6	14	14	35	46	−11	32
17	Maesteg Park (R)	34	7	11	16	51	72	−21	32
18	Porthcawl Town (R)	34	6	5	23	34	78	−44	23

Source: Welsh Football League
Rules for classification: 1) points; 2) goal difference; 3) number of goals scored.
(C) Champions; (P) Promoted; (R) Relegated

== Results ==
Home \ Away	LLC	PRT	AMM	CBH	CRO	CMC	CMT	CAE	LLN	LLW	MAE	NEM	NEW	PNR	PCT	TRE	TAW	UWIC
AFC Llwydcoed		3–1	4–3	1–3	3–4	0–1	3–0	0–2	4–2	3–2	2–1	3–3	3–2	2–2	4–1	4–1	4–5	2–1
AFC Porth	0–1		0–2	2–0	2–3	2–2	0–3	0–2	2–0	2–0	2–2	2–1	2–2	2–1	3–1	1–0	0–2	3–2
Ammanford	2–1	4–1		1–2	0–2	2–1	0–2	0–3	4–0	2–1	6–0	0–2	0–1	0–1	8–2	1–1	2–0	2–3
Cardiff Bay Harlequins	2–0	0–0	0–4		1–0	0–2	1–2	0–3	4–0	4–0	1–3	2–1	2–2	0–4	0–0	1–1	1–2	1–0
Croesyceiliog	0–1	0–0	1–2	4–1		1–0	3–1	1–1	1–0	1–1	1–2	2–2	1–1	1–3	4–0	1–0	5–0	0–0
Cwmbran Celtic	2–1	3–1	4–0	5–0	1–2		1–1	1–2	3–0	6–0	6–2	1–1	2–2	1–3	4–0	1–0	2–0	1–0
Cwmbran Town	0–2	0–2	0–1	2–1	1–1	2–3		3–3	1–2	0–2	3–3	4–1	1–1	0–2	2–1	0–1	0–3	0–2
Caerau (Ely)	2–0	1–2	3–2	3–3	1–3	3–0	3–1		1–2	3–0	3–1	1–3	3–3	3–5	3–0	2–1	5–1	3–3
Llangeinor	1–2	0–2	1–0	3–1	2–1	1–2	1–4	3–4		3–1	1–0	3–1	0–2	2–3	2–1	2–2	0–2	1–0
Llanwern	3–3	4–2	0–3	2–5	3–3	0–3	3–2	4–3	0–2		2–1	1–3	3–1	0–0	1–2	1–0	2–4	3–3
Maesteg Park	0–2	1–0	1–2	3–3	3–1	1–3	2–2	1–1	1–1	1–2		1–2	2–0	1–1	2–4	1–1	2–5	2–4
Newcastle Emlyn	3–1	1–2	1–1	2–2	2–1	1–3	1–2	2–0	0–1	2–1	0–1		1–3	2–3	1–0	2–0	1–2	3–2
Newport YMCA	3–2	1–3	1–1	4–1	2–2	1–1	3–1	3–2	0–3	3–0	0–0	0–1		4–2	2–3	1–0	1–0	1–3
Penrhiwceiber Rangers	4–3	2–1	3–5	5–2	2–2	1–1	5–2	0–3	1–0	1–4	3–0	3–1	3–2		2–1	1–0	1–1	2–0
Porthcawl Town	1–5	0–3	1–3	0–2	1–3	0–2	0–1	0–4	2–3	0–1	0–0	0–3	0–0	1–1		0–2	2–1	2–0
Tredegar Town	1–2	0–0	0–0	2–2	1–1	0–3	1–1	1–1	4–2	1–1	3–1	1–1	1–1	2–3	1–5		1–0	4–1
Treharris Athletic Western	3–2	4–1	2–2	2–3	1–1	2–1	2–3	0–3	1–2	3–2	5–5	4–1	2–0	3–3	3–1	1–1		4–4
UWIC Inter Cardiff F.C.	1–1	1–1	2–2	1–1	1–1	1–3	2–0	4–2	2–1	2–2	0–4	4–2	1–1	1–3	2–2	1–0	3–1	

Source: Welsh Football League
Legend: Blue = home team win; Yellow = draw; Red = away team win.
