= 2013–14 Welsh Football League Division Three =

Nathanielcars.co.uk Welsh League Division Three
- Season: 2013–14
- Teams: 19
- Matches: 342
- Goals: 1,342 (3.92 per match)
- Biggest home win: Barry Town United 9 - 0 Pontypridd Town 29 March 2014
- Biggest away win: Cwmaman Institute 0 - 5 Treharris Athletic Western 28 August 2013; Tredegar Town 0 - 5 Risca United 14 September 2013; Cwmaman Institute 0 - 5 Lliswerry 21 September 2013; Pontypridd Town 3 - 8 Bettws 05 October 2013; Cwmaman Institute 0 - 5 Llanwern 12 October 2013; Treharris Athletic Western 0 - 5 Cardiff Grange Harlequins 30 November 2013; Rhoose 1 - 6 Cwmamman United 28 December 2013; Treowen Stars 0 - 5 Barry Town United 11 January 2014
- Highest scoring: Treharris Athletic Western 5 - 6 Llanwern 21 September 2013; Pontypridd Town 3 - 8 Bettws 05 October 2013

== Welsh Football League Division Three ==
This league known as the Nathanielcars.co.uk Welsh League Division Three for sponsorship reasons, is a football league in Wales. This is the third division of football in South Wales and the fourth tier of the Welsh Football League.

The reigning champions are Cardiff Corinthians.

=== Promotion and relegation ===
New Teams entered into this League

- Barry Town United
- Llanelli Town
- Lliswerry
- Cwmamman United
- Rhoose
- Bettws

Teams relegated from 2012–13 Welsh Football League Division Two

- None

=== Stadia and locations ===
Club	Stadium	Location
Abertillery Bluebirds	Cwmnantygroes Field	Six Bells
Barry Town United	Jenner Park	Barry
Bettws	North Site	Bettws
Bridgend Street	The Willows	Cardiff
Cardiff Grange Harlequins	Cardiff International Sports Stadium	Cardiff
Cwmaman Institute	Canolfan Cwmaman	Aberdare
Cwmamman United	Grenig Park	Glanaman
Llanelli Town	Stebonheath Park	Llanelli
Llantwit Major	Windmill Ground	Llantwit Major
Llanwern	Newport Stadium	Newport
Lliswerry	Spytty Park	Newport
Newcastle Emlyn	Parc Emlyn	Newcastle Emlyn
Newport Civil Service	Civil Service Sports Club	Bettws
Pontypridd Town	Ynysangharad Park	Pontypridd
Rhoose	Jenner Park	Barry
Risca United	Ty-Isaf Park	Risca
Tredegar Town	Tredegar Leisure Complex	Tredegar
Treharris Athletic Western	Athletic Ground	Treharris
Treowen Stars	Bush Park	Newbridge

=== League table ===
Pos	Team	Pld	W	D	L	GF	GA	GD	Pts	Promotion or relegation
1	Barry Town United (C, P)	36	29	3	4	116	29	+87	90	Promotion to 2014–15 Welsh Football League Division Two
2	Llanwern (P)	36	27	7	2	112	41	+71	88	Promotion to 2014–15 Welsh Football League Division Two
3	Risca United (P)	36	23	6	7	96	51	+45	75	Promotion to 2014–15 Welsh Football League Division Two
4	Cwmamman United	36	23	4	9	106	63	+43	73	
5	Lliswerry	36	15	11	10	76	56	+20	56	
6	Llanelli Town	36	16	6	14	75	59	+16	54	
7	Rhoose	36	14	8	14	82	66	+16	50	
8	Tredegar Town	36	14	8	14	66	76	−10	50	
9	Cardiff Grange Harlequins	36	13	9	14	71	67	+4	48	
10	Newport Civil Service	36	12	5	19	65	79	−14	41	
11	Treowen Stars	36	12	5	19	49	84	−35	41	
12	Bridgend Street	36	11	7	18	58	73	−15	40	
13	Bettws	36	11	6	19	61	85	−24	39	
14	Llantwit Major	36	12	5	19	50	72	−22	38 (Note: 3 points deducted)	
15	Pontypridd Town	36	10	8	18	46	81	−35	38	
16	Treharris Athletic Western	36	9	10	17	61	91	−30	37	
17	Abertillery Bluebirds (R)	36	9	10	17	52	88	−36	37	Relegation to 2014–15 Gwent County League
18	Cwmaman Institute (R)	36	10	4	22	50	102	−52	34	Relegation to 2014–15 South Wales Senior League
19	Newcastle Emlyn (R)	36	8	6	22	50	79	−29	30	Relegation to 2014–15 Ceredigion League

Updated to match(es) played on 24 April 2014. Source:
Rules for classification: 1) points; 2) goal difference; 3) number of goals scored.
(C) Champions; (P) Promoted; (R) Relegated
