= 2013–14 Welsh Football League Division Two =

Nathanielcars.co.uk Welsh League Division Two
- Season: 2013–14
- Teams: 16
- Matches: 240
- Goals: 1,003 (4.18 per match)
- Biggest home win: Caldicot Town 14 - 0 Caerau 5 April 2014
- Biggest away win: Caerau 1 - 11 Briton Ferry Llansawel 21 August 2013
- Highest scoring: Croesyceiliog 14 - 1 Caerau 21 September 2013

== Welsh Football League Division Two ==
This league known as the Nathanielcars.co.uk Welsh League Division Two for sponsorship reasons, is a football league in Wales. This is the second division of football in South Wales and the third tier of the Welsh Football League.

The reigning champions are Goytre.

=== Promotion and relegation ===
Teams promoted from 2012–13 Welsh Football League Division Three

- Chepstow Town - Champions
- Cardiff Corinthians - 2nd Position

Teams relegated from 2012–13 Welsh Football League Division One

- Caerleon - 16th Position

=== Stadia and locations ===
Club	Stadium	Location
AFC Llwydcoed	Welfare Ground	Llwydcoed
Ammanford	Manor Road	Ammanford
Briton Ferry Llansawel	Old Road	Briton Ferry
Caerau	Caerau Athletic Ground (Riverboat)	Maesteg
Caerleon	Cold Bath Road	Caerleon
Caldicot Town	Jubilee Way	Caldicot
Cardiff Corinthians	The Riverside Ground	Radyr
Cardiff Metropolitan University	Cyncoed Campus	Cardiff
Chepstow Town	Larkfield Park	Chepstow
Croesyceiliog	Woodland Road	Croesyceiliog
Dinas Powys	The Murch	Dinas Powys
Ely Rangers	Station Road	Ely, Cardiff
Garden Village	Stafford Common	Kingsbridge, Swansea
Newport YMCA	The YMCA Ground	Newport
Penrhiwceiber Rangers	Glasbrook Field	Penrhiwceiber
Undy Athletic	The Causeway	Undy

=== League table ===
Pos	Team	Pld	W	D	L	GF	GA	GD	Pts	Promotion or relegation
1	Cardiff Metropolitan University (C, P)	30	20	6	4	86	24	+62	66	Promotion to 2014–15 Welsh Football League Division One
2	Briton Ferry Llansawel (P)	30	21	3	6	84	42	+42	66	Promotion to 2014–15 Welsh Football League Division One
3	Garden Village (P)	30	20	4	6	93	34	+59	64	Promotion to 2014–15 Welsh Football League Division One
4	Chepstow Town	30	19	7	4	84	36	+48	64	
5	Undy Athletic	30	19	6	5	70	32	+38	63	
6	Caldicot Town	30	15	8	7	78	34	+44	53	
7	Ely Rangers	30	12	7	11	62	56	+6	43	
8	Croesyceiliog	30	13	4	13	72	75	−3	43	
9	Penrhiwceiber Rangers	30	12	4	14	50	52	−2	40	
10	Caerleon	30	11	6	13	63	63	0	39	
11	AFC Llwydcoed	30	11	4	15	63	57	+6	37	
12	Dinas Powys	30	8	9	13	39	46	−7	33	
13	Ammanford	30	7	7	16	49	55	−6	28	
14	Cardiff Corinthians (R)	30	5	6	19	42	83	−41	21	Relegation to 2014–15 Welsh Football League Division Three
15	Newport YMCA (R)	30	4	3	23	37	99	−62	15	Relegation to 2014–15 Welsh Football League Division Three
16	Caerau (R)	30	1	0	29	31	215	−184	3	Relegation to 2014–15 Welsh Football League Division Three

Updated to match(es) played on 23 April 2014. Source:
Rules for classification: 1) points; 2) goal difference; 3) number of goals scored.
(C) Champions; (P) Promoted; (R) Relegated
