= MIFC =

MIFC is an acronym and may refer to:

- Midwest Intercollegiate Football Conference, a defunct college football conference in the United States
- Mynydd Isa F.C., a Welsh football (soccer) team
- Malaysia International Islamic Financial Centre (MIFC)
- Material & Information Flow Chart, a tool used in Value Stream Mapping
