= 2014–15 Welsh Football League Division One =

Nathanielcars.co.uk Welsh League Division One
- Season: 2014–15
- Teams: 16
- Champions: Caerau Ely

This league known as the Nathanielcars.co.uk Welsh League Division One for sponsorship reasons, is a football league in Wales. This is the top division of football in South Wales and the second tier of the Welsh Football League.

The reigning champions are Monmouth Town. However, they were not promoted to the Welsh Premier League as they did not meet the necessary ground criteria.

== Promotion and relegation ==
=== Teams promoted from 2013–14 Welsh Football League Division Two ===
- Cardiff Metropolitan University - Champions
- Briton Ferry Llansawel - 2nd Place
- Garden Village - 3rd Place

=== Teams relegated from 2013–14 Welsh Premier League ===
- Afan Lido

=== Stadia and Locations ===
Club	Stadium	Location	Capacity
Aberdare Town	Aberaman Park	Aberdare	3,000
Afan Lido	Marston Stadium	Port Talbot (playing in Aberavon)	4,200
AFC Porth	Dinas Park	Porth	-
Briton Ferry Llansawel	Old Road	Briton Ferry	-
Cardiff Metropolitan University	Cyncoed Campus	Cardiff	-
Caerau (Ely)	Cwrt-yr-Ala	Ely, Cardiff	-
Cambrian & Clydach Vale	King George V	Clydach Vale	-
Garden Village	Stafford Common	Kingsbridge, Swansea	-
Goytre	Plough Road	Perperlleni	-
Goytre United	Glenhafod Park Stadium	Goytre	4,000
Haverfordwest County	Bridge Meadow Stadium	Haverfordwest	2,000
Monmouth Town	Pen Y Pound Stadium	Abergavenny	-
Pen-y-Bont	Bryntirion Park	Bridgend	-
Pontardawe Town	The Recreation Ground	Pontardawe	-
Taff's Well	Rhiw Dda'r	Taff's Well	-
Ton Pentre	Ynys Park	Ton Pentre	-

=== League table ===
Pos	Team	Pld	W	D	L	GF	GA	GD	Pts	Promotion or relegation
1	Caerau (Ely) (C)	30	21	5	4	75	39	+36	68	
2	Haverfordwest County (P)	30	19	6	5	69	32	+37	63	Promotion to Welsh Premier League
3	Cardiff Metropolitan University	30	19	6	5	57	20	+37	63	
4	Goytre United	30	16	8	6	74	41	+33	56	
5	Pen-y-Bont	30	17	5	8	73	52	+21	56	
6	Monmouth Town	30	16	3	11	57	35	+22	51	
7	Briton Ferry Llansawel	30	13	9	8	52	37	+15	48	
8	Taff's Well	30	15	2	13	61	45	+16	47	
9	Ton Pentre	30	12	4	14	44	54	−10	40	
10	Goytre	30	11	3	16	46	47	−1	36	
11	Aberdare Town	30	10	5	15	48	68	−20	35	
12	Garden Village	30	8	10	12	49	61	−12	34	
13	Afan Lido	30	9	6	15	40	60	−20	33	
14	Cambrian & Clydach Vale	30	7	7	16	45	46	−1	28	
15	Pontardawe Town (R)	30	4	6	20	28	66	−38	18	Relegation to Welsh League Division Two
16	AFC Porth (R)	30	0	1	29	16	131	−115	1	Relegation to Welsh League Division Two

Source: Welsh Division 1 table
Rules for classification: 1) points; 2) goal difference; 3) number of goals scored.
(C) Champions; (P) Promoted; (R) Relegated
