= 2013–14 Welsh Premier League =

Welsh Premier League
- Season: 2013–14
- Champions: The New Saints
- Relegated: Afan Lido
- Champions League: The New Saints
- Europa League: Airbus UK Broughton; Aberystwyth Town; Bangor City
- Matches: 192
- Goals: 620 (3.23 per match)

The 2013–14 Welsh Premier League (known as the Corbett Sports Welsh Premier League for sponsorship reasons) was the 22nd season of the Welsh Premier League, the highest football league within Wales since its establishment in 1992. The season began on 23 August 2013 and ended on 17 May 2014 with the Europa League play-off final.

The New Saints won the league after 29 games.

The league's rules are contained as a section of the Handbook of the Football Association of Wales.

== Teams ==
Location of teams in the 2013–14 Welsh Premier League

Llanelli were relegated out of the Welsh Premier League the previous season, while Rhyl were promoted as winners of the Cymru Alliance.

=== Stadia and locations ===
| Team | Location | Stadium | Capacity |
|---|---|---|---|
| Aberystwyth Town | Aberystwyth | Park Avenue | 5,000 |
| Afan Lido | Aberavon | Lido Ground | 4,200 |
| Airbus UK Broughton | Broughton | The Airfield | 1,600 |
| Bala Town | Bala | Maes Tegid | 3,000 |
| Bangor City | Bangor | Nantporth | 3,000 |
| Carmarthen Town | Carmarthen | Richmond Park | 3,000 |
| Gap Connah's Quay | Connah's Quay | Deeside Stadium | 1,500 |
| Newtown | Newtown | Latham Park | 5,000 |
| Port Talbot Town | Port Talbot | Victoria Road | 6,000 |
| Prestatyn Town | Prestatyn | Bastion Road | 2,300 |
| Rhyl | Rhyl | Belle Vue | 3,000 |
| The New Saints | Oswestry | Park Hall | 2,000 |

== League table ==
| Pos | Team | Pld | W | D | L | GF | GA | GD | Pts | Qualification or relegation |
|---|---|---|---|---|---|---|---|---|---|---|
| 1 | The New Saints (C) | 32 | 22 | 7 | 3 | 86 | 20 | +66 | 73 | Qualification for Champions League second qualifying round |
| 2 | Airbus UK Broughton | 32 | 17 | 9 | 6 | 56 | 34 | +22 | 59 (Note: Airbus UK Broughton were deducted one point over a registration of a player.) | Qualification for Europa League first qualifying round |
| 3 | Carmarthen Town | 32 | 14 | 6 | 12 | 54 | 51 | +3 | 48 | Qualification for Europa League play-offs |
| 4 | Bangor City (O) | 32 | 14 | 6 | 12 | 47 | 50 | −3 | 48 | Qualification for Europa League play-offs |
| 5 | Newtown | 32 | 12 | 6 | 14 | 46 | 58 | −12 | 42 | Qualification for Europa League play-offs |
| 6 | Rhyl | 32 | 11 | 5 | 16 | 43 | 49 | −6 | 38 | Qualification for Europa League play-offs |
| 7 | Aberystwyth Town | 32 | 15 | 9 | 8 | 72 | 48 | +24 | 51 (Note: Aberystwyth Town were deducted three points for fielding a player under a yellow card suspension.) | Qualification for Europa League first qualifying round (Note: The 2013–14 Welsh Cup final was won by The New Saints. As The New Saints qualified for 2014–15 UEFA Champions League First qualifying round, Aberystwyth Town qualify automatically for the 2014–15 UEFA Europa League First qualifying round.) |
| 8 | Bala Town | 32 | 13 | 6 | 13 | 61 | 45 | +16 | 45 | |
| 9 | Port Talbot Town | 32 | 10 | 8 | 14 | 45 | 53 | −8 | 38 | |
| 10 | Connah's Quay Nomads | 32 | 10 | 8 | 14 | 47 | 65 | −18 | 38 | |
| 11 | Prestatyn Town | 32 | 9 | 8 | 15 | 42 | 47 | −5 | 35 (Note: Prestatyn Town were spared from relegation as Haverfordwest County, the only Welsh Football League Division 1 team to have been awarded a FAW Domestic Licence, failed to finish in the top two of the mentioned 2nd-tier league.) | |
| 12 | Afan Lido (R) | 32 | 3 | 6 | 23 | 21 | 100 | −79 | 15 | Relegation to Welsh Division One |

Source: Soccerway
Rules for classification: 1) points; 2) goal difference; 3) number of goals scored.
(C) Champions; (O) Play-off winners; (R) Relegated

=== Points deductions ===
Before the league season split into two, both Airbus UK Broughton and Aberystwyth Town both had a points deduction and fines given to them, with Airbus UK Broughton receiving a one-point deduction over a player registration, with Aberystwyth Town's ruling at a Disciplinary Panel meant they were deducted three points over playing a suspended player in a match against gap Connah's Quay.

== Results ==
Teams played each other twice on a home and away basis, before the league was split into two groups at the end of January 2014 - the top six and the bottom six.

=== Matches 1–22 ===
| Home \ Away | ABE | AFA | AIR | BAL | BAN | CMR | CQN | NEW | PTA | PRE | RHL | TNS |
|---|---|---|---|---|---|---|---|---|---|---|---|---|
| Aberystwyth Town | | 3–0 | 2–1 | 1–1 | 3–3 | 3–2 | 3–3 | 3–3 | 1–2 | 1–0 | 3–2 | 2–2 |
| Afan Lido | 2–1 | | 1–3 | 1–6 | 0–3 | 2–2 | 2–1 | 2–2 | 0–3 | 0–1 | 0–3 | 1–2 |
| Airbus UK Broughton | 4–1 | 2–0 | | 2–1 | 0–1 | 1–0 | 1–2 | 6–1 | 3–0 | 2–0 | 2–2 | 1–1 |
| Bala Town | 0–0 | 0–0 | 1–2 | | 1–0 | 2–4 | 7–0 | 1–0 | 0–0 | 2–1 | 0–1 | 1–3 |
| Bangor City | 3–2 | 1–0 | 0–1 | 4–2 | | 0–1 | 4–1 | 2–1 | 1–1 | 0–1 | 2–3 | 1–2 |
| Carmarthen Town | 0–3 | 3–0 | 0–1 | 2–0 | 4–4 | | 3–3 | 0–2 | 3–1 | 2–1 | 1–0 | 0–0 |
| Connah's Quay Nomads | 0–4 | 0–0 | 1–2 | 2–1 | 2–1 | 1–3 | | 0–4 | 0–2 | 2–2 | 1–3 | 0–4 |
| Newtown | 0–0 | 3–3 | 2–2 | 2–1 | 0–1 | 0–4 | 2–3 | | 2–0 | 2–1 | 2–0 | 1–0 |
| Port Talbot Town | 3–0 | 5–1 | 1–1 | 0–2 | 1–2 | 1–1 | 0–0 | 0–1 | | 1–2 | 1–0 | 1–3 |
| Prestatyn Town | 2–2 | 1–2 | 2–3 | 4–1 | 0–0 | 1–1 | 1–2 | 5–2 | 0–0 | | 0–0 | 1–0 |
| Rhyl | 0–3 | 3–0 | 2–2 | 2–4 | 0–0 | 2–0 | 2–1 | 0–1 | 5–2 | 2–1 | | 0–2 |
| The New Saints | 4–0 | 3–0 | 1–1 | 1–1 | 2–0 | 6–0 | 5–0 | 5–1 | 6–0 | 3–0 | 3–0 | |

Source: Welsh Premier League
Legend: Blue = home team win; Yellow = draw; Red = away team win.

=== Matches 23–32 ===
Top six

| Home \ Away | AIR | BAN | CMR | NEW | RHL | TNS |
|---|---|---|---|---|---|---|
| Airbus UK Broughton | | 0–1 | 1–2 | 1–0 | 2–1 | 1–1 |
| Bangor City | 2–4 | | 3–1 | 1–0 | 2–0 | 1–9 |
| Carmarthen Town | 1–2 | 0–1 | | 6–1 | 2–1 | 1–0 |
| Newtown | 1–1 | 3–1 | 0–3 | | 2–1 | 1–2 |
| Rhyl | 2–0 | 1–1 | 4–2 | 0–3 | | 0–2 |
| The New Saints | 1–1 | 4–1 | 4–0 | 3–1 | 2–1 | |

Source: Welsh Premier League
Legend: Blue = home team win; Yellow = draw; Red = away team win.

Bottom six

| Home \ Away | ABE | AFA | BAL | CQN | PTA | PRE |
|---|---|---|---|---|---|---|
| Aberystwyth Town | | 7–1 | 2–3 | 2–1 | 6–1 | 4–0 |
| Afan Lido | 0–6 | | 0–5 | 1–8 | 2–8 | 0–2 |
| Bala Town | 1–2 | 6–0 | | 2–0 | 3–1 | 2–4 |
| Connah's Quay Nomads | 3–0 | 3–0 | 1–1 | | 2–0 | 1–1 |
| Port Talbot Town | 1–1 | 0–0 | 2–1 | 1–2 | | 2–0 |
| Prestatyn Town | 0–1 | 4–0 | 1–2 | 1–1 | 2–4 | |

Source: Welsh Premier League
Legend: Blue = home team win; Yellow = draw; Red = away team win.

== UEFA Europa League play-offs ==
Teams who finished in positions third through sixth at the end of the regular season took part in play-offs to determine the second participant for the 2014–15 UEFA Europa League.

=== Semi-finals ===
10 May 2014
15:00 BST

| Bangor City | 1–0 | Newtown |
|---|---|---|
| Chris Jones 57' | Report |

Book People Stadium, Bangor
Attendance: 1572
Referee: Huw Jones

10 May 2014
15:00 BST

| Carmarthen Town | 1–6 | Rhyl |
|---|---|---|
| Bassett 45+3' | Report | Forbes 42', 90'; McManus 51' (pen.); Cadwallader 53'; Lewis 59', 68' (pen.) |

GenQuip Stadium, Port Talbot
Attendance: 311
Referee: Lee Evans

Notes

1. Carmarthen Town played their home match at GenQuip Stadium, Port Talbot instead of their regular stadium, Richmond Park, Carmarthen.

=== Final ===
17 May 2014
15:00 BST

| Bangor City | 2–0 | Rhyl |
|---|---|---|
| Davies 64'; Chris Jones 74' (pen.) | Report |

Book People Stadium, Bangor
Attendance: 3,442
Referee: Mark Whitby
