= Malaysia International Islamic Financial Centre =

The Malaysia International Islamic Financial Centre (MIFC) is an initiative of Malaysia’s financial market regulators and relevant government agencies dedicated to developing Malaysia’s Islamic finance market by engaging with industry and government. The initiative was launched in 2006 and is based in Kuala Lumpur, Malaysia.

The MIFC is supported by Bank Negara Malaysia, Securities Commission Malaysia, Labuan Financial Services Authority, and Bursa Malaysia. The MIFC’s private sector partners include Islamic banks, conventional banks with Islamic banking windows, investment banks, brokers, lawyers, Shariah advisory firms, Shariah scholars, accounting and tax advisers, ratings agencies and takaful providers.
