= Llanllyfni F.C. =

Defunct association football club in Wales

Llanllyfni
- Full name: CPD Llanllyfni
- Founded: 2005
- Dissolved: 2017
- Ground: King George V Playing Field
- 2016–17: Welsh Alliance League; Division Two (resigned)
Home colours	Away colours

Llanllyfni Football Club (Welsh: Clwb Pêl Droed Llanllyfni) were a Welsh football team based in Llanllyfni, Gwynedd, Wales.

== History ==
The club was formed in 2005, with many of the players that season having played for the village's junior teams including those who won the Gwyrfai League under-12 competition in 1992. The club was confirmed as one of three new clubs to join the Caernarfon & District League for the 2005–06 season. The team's first friendly took place in July against Rhiwlas. The following month saw the club's first competitive game against Caernarfon Borough. The club finished the season as league champions. The club were promoted to the Gwynedd League for following season, and finished 11th, from 16 clubs in the division. The following season saw more success with the club finishing as league champions. The club were promoted again, this time to the Welsh Alliance League and finished 13th from 17 clubs. The club left the league ahead of the 2009–10 season and folded due to a shortage of players.

The club reformed and returned to Caernarfon & District League in Division One for the 2010–11 season and immediately achieved more success, winning the title. The first season back in the Gwynedd League saw them finish in fourth place. The following season they finished seventh before in the 2013–14 season they finished bottom of the league. In a remarkable turnaround the following season they finished as league champions. Promoted back to the Welsh Alliance League as Division Two side, the club finished third in the 2015–16 season.

In May 2017, the club resigned from the Welsh Alliance League with two games of the season remaining, and their record in the league for the 2016–17 was expunged. The club folded shortly afterwards.

== Honours ==
- Gwynedd League
  - Champions (2): 2007–08, 2014–15
- Caernarfon & District League
  - Champions (2): 2005–06, 2010–11
