= Mynydd Isa F.C. =

Former association football club in Wales

Mynydd Isa
- Full name: Mynydd Isa Football Club
- Nickname: Spartans
- Founded: 1976
- Dissolved: 2009
- Ground: Argoed Sports Ground, Mynydd Isa
- Chairman: James Hollyoak
- Manager: James Hollyoak
- 2008–09: Cymru Alliance, 4th (of 17)
| Home colours | Away colours |

Mynydd Isa Football Club were a Welsh football team who played in the Cymru Alliance until the end of the 2008–09 season. They played their games at Argoed Sports Ground in Mynydd Isa, near Mold, Flintshire, Wales.

== History ==
(taken from the Welsh Alliance Site)

Founded in 1976, Mynydd Isa enjoyed their best seasons in 2004–05 and 2005–06, reaching the semi-final of the NEWFA Cup, finishing runners up in the Welsh National League (Wrexham Area) and also winning the League Cup for the second time in the club's history. Their first promotion to the Cymru Alliance was in 2006.

The club was dissolved in May 2009.

== Honours ==
- Welsh National League (Wrexham Area) Premier Division Runners-up: 2005–06
- Welsh National League (Wrexham Area) Division One Champions: 2001–02
- Welsh National League (Wrexham Area) Division Two Runners-up: 1996–97
- North East Wales FA Junior (Horace Wynne) Cup Winners: 2001–02
