= Cardiff Met F.C. =

Association football club in Wales

Coordinates: 51°30′44.982″N 3°9′34.9734″W

Cardiff Met Football Club
- Full name: Cardiff Met Football Club
- Nickname: The Archers
- Founded: 1957
- Ground: Cyncoed Stadium
- Capacity: 1,620 (510 seated)
- Manager: Ryan Jenkins
- League: Cymru Premier
- 2025–26: Cymru Premier, 9th of 12
- Website: https://cardiffmetfc.co.uk
Home colours	Away colours

Cardiff Met Football Club (Welsh: Clwb Pêl-droed Met Caerdydd), commonly known as Cardiff Met F.C., are a Welsh football club, based in Cyncoed, Cardiff that plays in the Cymru Premier. The club badge features the bowman with the words "I lwyddo, rhaid chwarae" which is translated as "To succeed, [one] must play".

== History ==
=== Origins: 1964-2000 ===
Cardiff Met F.C. was originally founded sometime before 1964 as the Cardiff College of Education F.C. They made their Welsh Amateur Cup debut in 1964, defeating Pembroke Borough 3–2 in their inaugural game and Dunlop Semtex 3–0 in the third round before suffering elimination in round 4 at the hands of Merthyr Tydfil.

During the 1966–67 and 1969–70 seasons, Cardiff College of Education reached the final of the Welsh Amateur Cup every year, winning the cup on 2 occasions in 1968 and 1969 beating Welshpool and Tonyrefail Welfare respectively.

During the 1972–73 season, Cardiff College joined the second division of the Welsh Football League, finishing a creditable 7th (amongst 19 teams) in their first season. The following season the club ended the campaign in 10th place and again reached the final of the Welsh Amateur Cup, losing 2–1 to Whitchurch Alport. The 1974–75 season saw the club promoted to the second tier of Welsh football for the first time following a second-place finish behind eventual champions Blaenavon Blues, despite ending the season level on points.

The 1975–76 season saw the club complete a league and FAW Intermediate Cup double, scoring over 100 goals in the process. The promotion meant the club would be playing at the top level of Welsh Football for the first time in its history. However, after two seasons in the Welsh League South Premier Division, the 1978–79 season saw the team record only one win and its lowest ever points tally to finish bottom of the league. During this season, they renamed themselves to South Glamorgan Institute F.C. in 1979 when their host college (Cardiff) merged with neighbouring colleges.

In the following 7 seasons, the club recorded consistent mid-table finishes until the 1986–87 season when the club was once again relegated back to the third tier of Welsh football for the first time since 1974. Before the 1990 season, the college renamed itself to Cardiff Institute of Higher Education, so the club once again rebranded to Cardiff Institute of Higher Education F.C. for the 1990–1991 season.

Once again, the club was demoted to the Welsh League Division 3 following the inception of the League of Wales in 1992. It was not until the 1995–96 season that the club was promoted back to level 3 of the Welsh Pyramid, scoring 104 goals in 28 league games and without losing a game all season. Back-to-back promotions were confirmed the following season as the Archers secured a second-place finish, six points behind champions Bridgend Town.

=== Merge with Inter Cardiff: 2000-2012 ===
After 3 seasons in Welsh League Division 1, it was announced that the club would be merging with Inter Cardiff to form a new club, UWIC Inter Cardiff, for the 2000–01 season of the League of Wales. With only 3 wins and 13 points, the club was relegated after one season. They returned to the Welsh League Division 1 where they remained until the 2006–07 campaign which saw the Archers demoted to Division 2.

In 2009, the club again rebranded to UWIC and appointed former professional footballer and Welsh international Christian Edwards as their Director of Football. Edwards was ably assisted by Professor Robyn Jones, who was part of the Sutton United team that dumped Coventry City out of the FA Cup in 1989. Initially, the club dropped back into Welsh League Division 3 due to a Cymru Premier restructure. Whilst the 2010–11 season ended with a mid table finish, the club equaled their best Welsh Cup showing by reaching the quarterfinals, only to lose 4–0 at the hands of GAP Connah's Quay.

=== Cardiff Metropolitan University F.C: 2012–present ===
Preceding the 2012 season, the club rebranded to Cardiff Metropolitan University F.C., and immediately showed success by getting back to back champions in the 2012–13 and 2013–14 seasons.

Despite the club starting a 2014–15 campaign in Welsh League Division 1, they were unable to gain a third successive promotion and a chance to play at the top level of Welsh football following a loss of 5–0 to Aberdare Town.

The 2015–16 season began with the Archers as favourites to get promoted and despite being pushed all the way by both Barry and Goytre, promotion was sealed in late April with a 3–0 victory at Taff's Well to ensure Capital City representation in the Cymru Premier for the first time since the 2005–06 season.

The 2016–17 campaign picked up just one point from their first 6 matches with a goalless draw away to Cefn Druids. A run of 3 consecutive victories within a week proved the catalyst to not only ensuring survival but qualifying for the end of season Europa League Play-offs with a 6th-place finish. Met faced Carmarthen Town and despite going a goal down early in the second half, a sumptuous lob from Adam Roscrow and an injury time diving header from Charlie Corsby was enough to see the club through to face Bangor City in the final. The dream was shattered when Dean Rittenburg drilled home from 12 yards for the Citizens to give Bangor a 1 – 0 victory and a passport into the Europa League Qualifying round.

On 19 May 2019, Cardiff Met defeated Bala Town F.C. in a penalty shoot-out to qualify for the preliminary round of the 2019–20 UEFA Europa League, but lost to Progrés Niederkorn in the preliminary round due to the away goals rule. The club played their only home match in Europe to date at Cardiff International Sports Stadium.

=== League and cup history ===
Season	League Contested	Level	Pld	W	D	L	GF	GA	GD	Pts	League Position	Avg. Home Attendance^{1}	Welsh Cup	Welsh League Cup	Leading scorer^{1}
1972–73	Welsh League South Division Two	3	36	19	7	10	85	57	+28	45	7th of 19	??	R1	n/a	unknown ??
1973–74	Welsh League South Division Two	3	32	11	5	16	56	48	+8	27	10th of 17	??	R1	n/a	unknown ??
1974–75	Welsh League South Division Two	3	34	27	5	2	112	22	+90	59	2nd of 18 Promoted	??	QR	n/a	unknown ??
1975–76	Welsh League South Division One	2	34	25	4	5	108	22	+86	54	1st of 18 Promoted	??	R3	n/a	unknown ??
1976–77	Welsh League South Premier Division	1	34	15	9	10	54	38	+16	39	4th of 18	??	R1	n/a	unknown ??
1977–78	Welsh League South Premier Division	1	34	11	7	16	48	57	−9	29	13th of 18	??	R1	n/a	unknown ??
1978–79	Welsh League South Premier Division	1	34	1	7	26	25	88	−63	9	18th of 18 Relegated	??	R1	n/a	unknown ??
1979–80	Welsh League South Division One	2	34	7	13	14	37	62	−25	27	15th of 18	??	R1	n/a	unknown ??
1980–81	Welsh League South Division One	2	34	13	13	8	42	45	−3	39	5th of 18	??	R3	n/a	unknown ??
1981–82	Welsh League South Division One	2	34	12	8	14	53	53	0	44	9th of 18	??	R2	n/a	unknown ??
1982–83	Welsh League South Division One	2	32	16	5	11	71	54	+17	33	12th of 17	??	R3	n/a	unknown ??
1983–84	Welsh League South Premier Division	2	36	14	8	14	75	68	+7	50	9th of 19	??	R1	n/a	unknown ??
1984–85	Welsh League South Premier Division	2	34	12	6	16	54	69	−15	42	10th of 18	??	R2	n/a	unknown ??
1985–86	Welsh League South Premier Division	2	34	9	9	16	46	80	−34	36	15th of 18	??	R2	n/a	unknown ??
1986–87	Welsh League South Premier Division	2	34	4	5	25	26	98	−72	17	18th of 18 Relegated	??	R1	n/a	unknown ??
1987–88	Welsh League South Division One	3	34	2	11	21	24	77	−53	17	18th of 18	??	R1	n/a	unknown ??
1988–89	Welsh League South Division One	3	34	9	6	19	40	74	−34	33	15th of 18	??	R1	n/a	unknown ??
1989–90	Welsh League South Division One	3	32	9	6	17	40	63	−23	33	14th of 17	??	R1	n/a	unknown ??
1990–91	Welsh League South Division Two	3	32	11	3	18	40	70	−30	36	12th of 17	??	R1	n/a	unknown ??
1991–92	Welsh League South Division Two	3	32	7	7	18	41	67	−26	28	14th of 17	??	R1	n/a	unknown ??
1992–93	Welsh Football League Division Three	4	26	11	6	9	63	49	+14	39	5th of 14	??	QR	n/a	unknown ??
1993–94	Welsh Football League Division Three	4	26	4	6	16	28	72	−44	18	12th of 14	??	n/a	n/a	unknown ??
1994–95	Welsh Football League Division Three	4	30	17	8	5	82	35	+47	55	4th of 16	??	QR	n/a	unknown ??
1995–96	Welsh Football League Division Three	4	28	26	2	0	104	16	+88	80	1st of 15 Promoted	??	n/a	n/a	unknown ??
1996–97	Welsh Football League Division Two	3	30	20	5	5	80	25	+55	65	2nd of 16 Promoted	??	R1	n/a	unknown ??
1997–98	Welsh Football League Division One	2	36	18	7	11	59	35	+24	61	7th of 19	??	R3	n/a	unknown ??
1998–99	Welsh Football League Division One	2	34	15	8	11	49	44	+5	53	5th of 18	??	R2	n/a	unknown ??
1999-00	Welsh Football League Division One	2	34	10	8	16	50	82	−32	38	15th of 18	??	R3	n/a	unknown ??
2000–01	League of Wales	1	34	3	4	27	26	104	−78	13	18th of 18; Relegated	??	R2	n/a	unknown ??
2001–02	Welsh Football League; Division One	2	36	23	7	6	81	45	+36	76	3rd of 19	??	R2	n/a	unknown ??
2002–03	Welsh Football League; Division One	2	34	23	7	4	67	33	+34	76	3rd of 18	??	R4	n/a	unknown ??
2003–04	Welsh Football League; Division One	2	34	21	6	7	72	33	+39	69	4th of 18	??	QF	n/a	unknown ??
2004–05	Welsh Football League; Division One	2	34	15	6	13	65	49	+16	51	9th of 18	??	R2	n/a	unknown ??
2005–06	Welsh Football League; Division One	2	34	16	6	12	61	52	+9	54	5th of 18	??	R3	n/a	unknown ??
2006–07	Welsh Football League; Division One	2	36	9	6	21	46	74	−28	33	16th of 19	??	R2	n/a	unknown ??
2007–08	Welsh Football League; Division Two	3	34	15	11	8	59	42	+17	56	5th of 18	??	n/a	n/a	unknown ??
2008–09	Welsh Football League; Division Two	3	34	14	4	16	76	67	+9	46	10th of 18^{2}	??	R1	n/a	unknown ??
2009–10	Welsh Football League; Division Two	3	34	11	11	12	57	59	−2	44	12th of 18; Relegated^{3}	??	PR	n/a	unknown ??
2010–11	Welsh Football League; Division Three	4	34	14	7	13	59	47	+12	49	9th of 18	??	QF	n/a	unknown ??
2011–12	Welsh Football League; Division Three	4	28	13	5	10	49	51	−2	44	6th of 15^{4}	??	R1	n/a	unknown ??
2012–13	Welsh Football League; Division Three	4	30	23	3	4	98	41	+57	72	1st of 16; Promoted	??	1Q	n/a	unknown ??
2013–14	Welsh Football League; Division Two	3	30	20	6	4	86	24	+62	66	1st of 16; Promoted	??	R3	n/a	unknown ??
2014–15	Welsh Football League; Division One	2	30	19	6	5	69	32	+37	63	3rd of 16	??	R4	n/a	unknown ??
2015–16	Welsh Football League; Division One	2	30	19	5	6	63	26	+37	62	1st of 16; Promoted	??	QF	R1	unknown ??
2016–17	Welsh Premier League	1	32	10	6	16	41	41	0	36	6th of 12	264	R4	R2	Adam Roscrow (6)
2017–18	Welsh Premier League	1	32	12	7	13	46	41	+5	43	6th of 12	283	R4	F	Eliot Evans (12)
2018–19	Welsh Premier League	1	32	16	3	13	53	40	+13	51	7th of 12	259	SF	W	Eliot Evans (8)
2019–20	Cymru Premier	1	25	9	8	8	30	29	+1	35	7th of 12	241	SF	R3	Eliot Evans (7)
2020–21	Cymru Premier	1	32	11	7	14	47	46	+1	40	8th of 12	0	n/a	n/a	Ollie Hulbert (14)
2021–22	Cymru Premier	1	32	10	12	10	35	38	-3	42	7th of 12	211	R4	F	Adam Roscrow (10)
2022–23	Cymru Premier	1	32	16	4	12	41	49	-8	52	4th of 12	193	R2	SF	Sam Jones (12)
2023–24	Cymru Premier	1	32	10	9	13	35	63	-28	36	6th of 12	265	SF	SF	Eliot Evans (13)
2024–25	Cymru Premier	1	32	12	8	12	43	45	-2	44	5th of 12	285	R3	QF	Ryan Reynolds and Tom Vincent (10)

^{1}: League games only
^{2}: Name reverted to UWIC at end of season.
^{3}: Relegated as part of League reorganization
^{4}: Name changed to Cardiff Metropolitan University F.C. at end of season.

Last Updated: 30 August 2020

QR = Qualifying Round; R = Round Proper; P = Position; Pld = Matches played; W = Matches won; D = Matches drawn; L = Matches lost; GF = Goals for; GA = Goals against; GD = Goal difference; Pts = Points

== Honours ==
=== League ===
- Welsh Football League Division One
  - Champions: 1975–76, 2015–16
- Welsh Football League Division Two
  - Champions: 2013–14
  - Runner-up: 1974–75, 1996–97
- Welsh Football League Division Three
  - Champions: 1995–96, 2012–13

=== Cups ===
- Welsh Amateur Cup
  - Champions: 1968, 1969, 1976
  - Runner-up: 1967, 1970, 1974
- Welsh League Cup
  - Champions: 2019
  - Runners-up: 2018, 2022

== European record ==
All results (home and away) list Cardiff's goal tally first.

Updated 4 July 2019

Season	Competition	Round	Club	Home	Away	Agg.
2019–20	UEFA Europa League	PR	(Luxembourg) Progrès Niederkorn	2–1	0–1	2–2 (a)

Notes

- PR: Preliminary round

== Current squad ==
As of 31 August 2026

Note: Flags indicate national team as defined under FIFA eligibility rules; some limited exceptions apply. Players may hold more than one non-FIFA nationality.

No.	Pos.	Nation	Player
1	GK	ENG	Arron Davies
2	DF	ENG	Tom English
3	DF	ENG	Joel Edwards
4	DF	ENG	Jack Vearle
5	DF	ENG	James Clarke (player/ coach)
6	MF	WAL	Ryan Reynolds
8	DF	WAL	CJ Craven
9	FW	WAL	Jasper Payne
10	FW	WAL	Sam Jones
11	FW	ZAM	Lifumpa Mwandwe
12	MF	NZL	Bailey Gaughan
13	GK	ENG	Will Howard

No.	Pos.	Nation	Player
14	DF	ENG	Spencer Dymond-Hall
16	MF	WAL	Myles McKenzie
18	FW	WAL	Tomos Lloyd
20	MF	WAL	Harri John
21	DF	WAL	Mitchell Ford
23	DF	ENG	Jack Hooper (on loan from Bristol City)
24	MF	ENG	Aaron Wildig
25	DF	WAL	Jack Block
26	MF	WAL	Ollie Good
29	FW	WAL	Harrison Matthews
33	DF	ENG	Toby Raison
36	FW	WAL	Sam Snaith (on loan from Briton Ferry Llansawel)

=== Out on loan ===
Note: Flags indicate national team as defined under FIFA eligibility rules; some limited exceptions apply. Players may hold more than one non-FIFA nationality.

No.	Pos.	Nation	Player
22	FW	WAL	Jonah Williams (at Newport City until January 2027)
