= Cwmamman United A.F.C. =

Association football club in Wales

Coordinates: 51°48′17.8″N 3°55′59.8″W

Cwmamman United
- Full name: Cwmamman United Football Club
- Founded: 1976
- Ground: Grenig Park; Glanaman
- Owner: Alun Rees
- Chairman: Lance Williams
- Manager: Eirian Rees
- League: West Wales Premier League
- 2025–26: West Wales Premier League, 6th of 15
- Website: http://www.cwmammanunited.co.uk/news.php
| Home colours | Away colours |

Cwmamman United A.F.C are a Welsh football team formed in 1976. They are based in the village of Glanaman, Carmarthenshire, Wales. Cwmamman United currently have three senior teams and seven junior teams. The club plays in the West Wales Premier League. They play their home games at Grenig Park.

== History ==
Cwmamman United started their history in 1976 in the Neath & District League Division Three. In Season 1981–82 Cwmamman entered a reserve side in Division Four of the same league. Further success came for the first team as they were once again promoted to Division One in 1983–84 season. It was not long before (season 1985–86) when Cwmamman were promoted to the Premier League. The next few seasons were an up and down affair with relegation from the premier being followed by promotion back to the premier. Cwmamman were then relegated once more and didn't return to the Premier until season 1998–99 and in that season finished runners-up and played in a play-off game against Garden Village to enter the Welsh Football League which they lost 3–0 after extra time. Cwmamman finally won the Premier Division in season 2001–02 and then entered the Welsh League for season 2002–03. Cwmamman were relegated in season 2010–11 after finishing fourth from bottom and due to the restructure of the Welsh League.

In 2017, Cwmamman reached Division One of the Welsh Football League for the first time after winning promotion. They started celebrating their 50th-anniversary in 2025, and Ammanford A.F.C. gave them a plaque for the special occasion.
