= Pontyclun F.C. =

Association football club in Wales

Coordinates: 51°31′6.9″N 3°23′47.6″W

Pontyclun FC
- Full name: Pontyclun Football Club
- Nickname: The Clun
- Founded: 1896
- Ground: Ivor Park, Pontyclun
- Capacity: 2,000
- Chairman: Tudor Davies
- Manager: Glyndŵr Davies
- League: South Wales Premier League Premier Division
- 2025–26: South Wales Premier League Premier Division, 4th of 13
- Website: http://www.pontyclunfc.com/
Home colours	Away colours

Pontyclun Football Club is an amateur Welsh football club based in Pontyclun. It currently plays in the South Wales Premier League as of the 2025–26 season following relegation from the Ardal South West League.

Founded in 1896, the club originally played in the Bridgend & District League before joining the Cardiff & District League at the end of World War I. In 1922 the club was admitted to the Football Association of Wales – one of few amateur clubs to achieve such status at that time.

Pontyclun's club motto "gorau chwarae, cyd chwarae" which roughly translates as "the best players, play together", was first used in the 1920s by Thomas Edgar Russell and has since been adopted by the FAW and to this day features on the playing shirts of the national players.

In 1968 the club was admitted to the Welsh Football League, finishing the 1968–69 season in 13th place in Division Two. At the same time the club continued to run senior teams in both the Rhondda and Pontypridd local leagues.

In 1980 they gained promotion to Division One but were relegated after two seasons there. In 1993 they returned to the division, by then named Division Two, and stayed until 1998. They returned again in 2003 and remained there until relegation in 2007–08 and in 2011–12 the team finished bottom of Division Three and were relegated from the Welsh League after 44 consecutive seasons of membership.

After relegation from the Welsh League, the club spent three seasons in the South Wales Amateur League. In 2015 the two leagues merged and Pontyclun became founding members of the South Wales Alliance League Premier Division. They won this league in 2016–17 and returned to the Welsh League.

In 2020 they were announced as members of the new Ardal South West at tier 3. After its first season was cancelled due to the COVID-19 pandemic, the club finished 3rd in two consecutive seasons. They fell to finish 13th in 2023–24 and bottom in 2024–25, resulting in relegation to the South Wales Premier League Premier Division.

Four notable Pontyclun players have achieved high honours – Thomas Edgar Russell who was goalkeeper and secretary in the 1920s became President of the FAW from 1968 to 1972. Former Cardiff City centre half Keith Pontin, who was also a Pontyclun youth product and local boy was capped by Wales in 1981. Wayne Morgan, who was a professional with Norwich City was capped by Wales at Under 17's level and Craig Williams was capped by the Boys Clubs of Wales in 2002 as well as representing the Swansea City and Cardiff City youth teams.
