= Treowen Stars F.C. =

Association football club in Wales

Coordinates: 51°40′9″N 3°9′1″W

Treowen Stars AFC
- Full name: Treowen Stars Football Club
- Nickname: The Stars
- Founded: 1926; 100 years ago
- Ground: Bush Park, The Uplands, Treowen, NP11 4RX
- Capacity: 950
- Chairman: Gary Evans
- Coach: Ben Murphy
- League: Cymru South
- 2025–26: Cymru South, 9th of 16
Home colours	Away colours

Treowen Stars F.C. are a Welsh football club from the village of Treowen near Newbridge, Caerphilly. The club plays in the Cymru South.

== History ==
Treowen Stars were formed in 1926 in the village of Treowen, near Newbridge, and played most of their early football in the Abertillery & District and West Monmouthshire Leagues.

It was in the early 1970's under the chairmanship of Archie Davies that Treowen, by now in the Monmouthshire Senior League, planted the seeds of success. In 1973, new changing rooms were erected just below the field at Bush Park, largely paid for with proceeds of a successful tote run by the Committee at the time. It wasn't until 1984 that the club was given licence to sell alcohol on the premises. It didn't take long though to reconstruct the inside of the building, since a very strong social element had been instrumental in keeping the club going financially.

In 1980 the Gwent County League had been formed from a merger of the Monmouthshire Senior League and the Gwent Premier League. In 1985–86, Treowen Stars won promotion from Division 3 of the Gwent County League and started the climb up the ladder. In 1990–91, Treowen gained promotion from Division 2 and a year later clinched the Division 1 title at the first attempt. This coincided with a restructuring of the Welsh football pyramid and Treowen were offered a place in the Welsh Football League. Within weeks, the required ground improvements were completed and Treowen entered the league.

In 1992–93, the club's first season in the league, The Stars won the Welsh Football League Division Three title in March, winning 21 and drawing 4 of their 26 league games. Treowen won promotion again the following year, this time as Welsh Football League Division Two runners-up, having lost out on goal difference to Taffs Well. The 1993–94 season also saw them reach the Welsh League Cup final, losing to Barry Town at Coychurch Road, Bridgend.

The next four seasons from 1994 to 1998 would see Treowen Stars become an established top six Welsh Football League Division One side, recording 6th, 5th, 4th & 4th-placed finishes respectively. The club also won the Welsh League Cup in 1998, with a 4–3 victory after extra time over BP Llandarcy, again at Coychurch Road in Bridgend. Between 1997 and 2003 the club experienced mixed fortunes; they reached the last 32 of the Welsh Cup on four occasions, but also suffered consecutive relegations in 2000–01 and 2001–02.

Three seasons of top 10 finishes followed in Division Three, before Treowen Stars were relegated from the Welsh Football League to the Gwent County League at the end of the 2005–06 season, losing out by a single point to Cwmbran Celtic and Llantwit Fardre. Four seasons later in 2009–10, Treowen were crowned Gwent County Division One champions and returned to the Welsh Football League.

Treowen remained at this level, until another restructuring of the Welsh football league system in 2019–20 saw them compete in the final season of the Welsh Football League Division Two. Treowen Stars finished in 13th place, calculated on a points per game basis due to the COVID-19 pandemic. In 2020–21, Treowen Stars took their place in the newly-formed Ardal South East league where they finished 7th, followed by 6th and 10th–placed finishes in respective seasons thereafter.

In the summer of 2024, Ben Murphy was appointed as First Team Manager.

The club now have an active junior section with teams from Under 6's to youth level, both boys and girls and are currently fundraising to improve facilities at Bush Park.

== Honours ==
=== League ===
- Ardal South East
  - Champions: 2024–25
- Welsh Football League Division Two
  - Runners-up: 1993–94
- Welsh Football League Division Three
  - Champions: 1992–93
- Gwent County League Division 1
  - Champions: 1991–92; 2009–10

=== Cup ===
- Welsh League Cup
  - Winners:1997–98
  - Runners-up:1993–94
- Gwent Premier League County Motors Cup – Winners: 2009–10

== Players ==
Note: Flags indicate national team as defined under FIFA eligibility rules; some limited exceptions apply. Players may hold more than one non-FIFA nationality.

No.	Pos.	Nation	Player
—	GK	WAL	Cael Jones
—	FW	WAL	Chris Hartland
—	MF	WAL	Corey Mitchell
—	DF	WAL	Tommy James
—	FW	WAL	Corey Jenkins
—	DF	WAL	Aaron Thomas
—	DF	WAL	Gavin Meacham
—	DF	WAL	Nathan Gulley
—	MF	WAL	Christian Davies
—	MF	WAL	Jordan Needs
—	MF	WAL	Macsen Evans

No.	Pos.	Nation	Player
—	MF	WAL	Jak Lewis
—	FW	WAL	Chris Colvin
—	DF	WAL	Craig Mcdonnall
—	FW	WAL	Carter Campbell
—	MF	WAL	Scott Jones
—	FW	WAL	Kyle Williams
—	DF	WAL	Leigh Sharp
—	MF	WAL	Callum Chivers
—	GK	WAL	Jon Green
—	DF	WAL	Jamie Russell

== Youth teams ==
Treowen Stars have a number of Mini, Junior and Youth Teams that develop players for the first team. Players can start young, as early as under 7's and progress to the under 16's. Mini and Junior teams at Treowen play in the Islwyn Youth League.

Season 22/23 saw both the U12s and U14s win their respective leagues without dropping a point.

Treowen Youth currently operates an U18s and U19s team.
