= Llantwit Fardre F.C. =

Association football club in Wales

Llantwit Fardre
- Full name: Llantwit Fardre Football Club
- Founded: 1958
- League: South Wales Premier League Premier Division
- 2025–26: South Wales Premier League Premier Division, 8th of 13
Home colours	Away colours

Llantwit Fardre Football Club are an association football club based in the village of Llantwit Fardre near Pontypridd, Wales. They play in the South Wales Premier League Premier Division.

From 2003 to 2010 they played in the Welsh Football League Division Three.

== Honours ==
- South Wales Alliance League Division Two – Champions: 2022–23
- South Wales Amateur League Division One – Champions: 1982–83, 2002–03
- South Wales Amateur League Division Two – Champions: 1976–77
