= Ely Rangers A.F.C. =

Association football club in Wales

Ely Rangers
- Full name: Ely Rangers Association Football Club
- Nickname: The Griffins
- Founded: 1965
- Ground: Station Road, Wenvoe
- Capacity: 500
- Chairman: Graham Clarke
- Manager: Stephen 'Okay' Kelleher
- League: South Wales Premier League Premier Division
- 2025–26: South Wales Premier League Premier Division, 11th of 13
Home colours	Away colours

Ely Rangers Association Football Club are a Welsh association football team founded in 1965. They are based in Ely, Cardiff and they play at Station Road, Wenvoe near Cardiff. They play in the South Wales Premier League Premier Division.

== History ==
Ely Rangers' origins date back to 1963–64 at a time when the club did not have enough players to put out a full side, so they joined with Heath Park Rangers. After just one season, a chance meeting with other boys from Ely whilst on holiday at Butlins resulted in the formation of Ely Rangers AFC in 1965. The club joined the Cardiff Combination League and quickly established themselves as a major playing force, in season 1967–68 they were crowned champions of the first division, and within two seasons in the senior division they won the first of five championships, their further triumphs came in 1970–71, 1975–76, 1977–78 and 1978–79. The club's success was not limited to the league, as they won the Combination Cup on five occasions, the City Supporters Cup four times and the Senior Cup twice. Following this successful period, the club were on the look out for a Ground of their own, so they could further their ambition of South Wales Amateur League status. In 1983 Ely Rangers moved into Station Road Wenvoe, and were accepted into the Amateur League. Success followed, winning the Corinthian Cup and the SWFA Amateur cup twice.

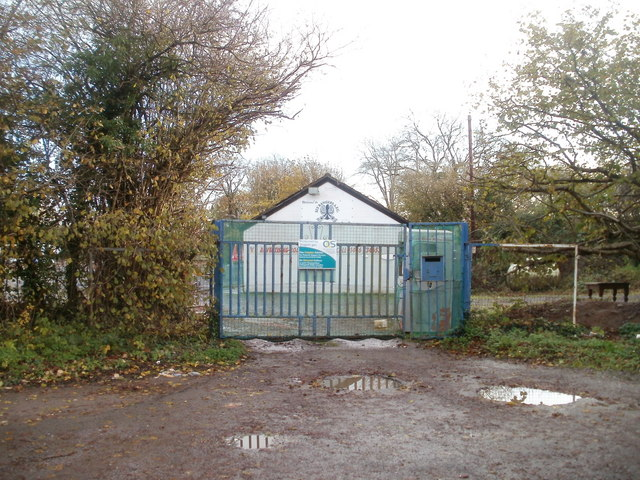
Entrance gates to Ely Rangers AFC ground, Station Road

In the Amateur League the best finish was runners up, until the 1996–97 season where Ely Rangers won the First Division Championship under Manager John Boulton. Rangers then had to contest a play-off with old local rivals Caerau Ely, at Ninian Park and won the game 3–0 in front of 1,300 spectators, to claim their place in the Welsh Football League for season 1997–98.

In the Welsh League, Rangers spent the first three seasons in division three finishing 5th, 5th, and then runners up (drawing only 3 games and winning the rest) and in turn promotion. Division Two was a short stay of only one season finishing 3rd and again gaining promotion. Season 2001–02, Ely entered into the First Division and finished in eighth position, however, in the last few seasons Ely have finished 15th, and 14th twice.

At the end of the 2018–19 season the club were relegated from the Welsh Football League and joined the South Wales Alliance League Premier Division. They were then relegated for a second successive season at the end of the 2019–20 season, dropping to the First Division for 2020–21.

In 2024 they won the W John Owen Cup.

== Club Crest ==
The Ely Rangers AFC crest dates back to the club's formation in the 1960s.

The club received a great deal of help in its early days from Barclays Bank (a link that is still alive today) and the 'iron eagle' that forms the basis of the club's crest is directly linked to the old Barclays logo.

The club crest is completed by the addition of the club name above the eagle, along with the club's year of formation beneath it.

The club's nickname of 'The Griffins' also derives from the crest after the club's eagle symbol was mistaken for that of the griffin mythical creature.

== Current Senior Team squad ==
Note: Flags indicate national team as defined under FIFA eligibility rules; some limited exceptions apply. Players may hold more than one non-FIFA nationality.

No.	Pos.	Nation	Player
1	GK	WAL	Jaedyn Brana
13	GK	WAL	Shaun-Paul Chapman
5	DF	WAL	Andrew Muscat
3	DF	WAL	Luke Davidson
2	DF	ENG	Harry Baily
4	DF	WAL	Morgan Ashworth
4	DF	WAL	Zach Cleary
5	DF	WAL	Luke Birnage
2	DF	WAL	Ethan Cavney
15	DF	WAL	Yusef Moore
6	MF	WAL	Reuben Bryl
7	MF	WAL	Oliver Bradley
8	MF	WAL	Archie Leckie
9	FW	WAL	Richard Greaves
10	FW	WAL	Alex Long (Captain)
11	FW	WAL	Jaden Bahumaid
12	FW	WAL	Tobi Winton
14	FW	WAL	Luke Garland
16	FW	USA	Peter Olson
—			
—			
—			
—			

== Club Committee ==
- Director of Football : (Wales) Jason Clarke
- 1st Team Manager: (Wales) Stevie Kelleher
- 1st Team Coach: (Wales) Richard Yarr
- 1st Team Analyst: (China) Junyuan Ding
- Secretaries : (Wales) Lee Smith & Jason Jones
- Kitman: (Wales) Jason Clarke
- Groundsman: (Wales) Paul Bryant
