= Risca United F.C. =

Association football club in Risca, Wales

Coordinates: 51°30′6.4″N 3°14′14.6″W

Risca United
- Full name: Risca United Association Football Club
- Nickname: The Cuckoos
- Founded: 1946
- Ground: Ty-Isaf Park, Risca
- Capacity: 3000
- Chairman: Robb Derraven
- Coach: Scott Oldridge & Gareth Kedward
- League: Ardal SE League
- 2025–26: Ardal SE League, 12th of 16
Home colours	Away colours

Risca United Association Football Club is a football club based in Risca, South Wales. The team plays in the Ardal SE League.

== History ==
Established in 1946 Risca United A.F.C. are a Welsh League football club. They are nicknamed the "Cuckoos", in keeping with the town's legend of the Cuckoo. The club's motto is "Integrity".

From 2001 to 2005 the club was called Risca & Gelli United.

The home ground is Ty-Isaf Park, now managed by the club through a long-term lease from its owners, Caerphilly County Borough Council. It is undergoing development to improve its facilities, to include seating in its 500 (standing) capacity spectator stand. Floodlights, improved dressing rooms and playing surface are part of the planned developments.

Supported by a committee including, Secretary, Stuart Luckwell and the Management Committee, the club has two senior teams competing in The Welsh Football League, an under 19s Youth side also competes in the Welsh Youth Cup and the Youth Division of the Welsh Football League.

Risca United are also affiliated to the Clubs for Young People Wales (previously the Boys & Girls Clubs of Wales). Three of its players (Knott, Griffiths, Sharp) gained CYP Welsh Caps at under 18 level in season 2011–12.

The club have had connections with Coleg Gwent Crosskeys Football Academy and in season 2026 2027 have formed a partnership with Cardiff Metropolitan University to enable 16-21 year olds to gain valuable senior football experience.

In September 2023, Ty isaf were a victim of an arson attack that destroyed their changing rooms.

In May 2024 the club were youth and reserve league winners. In May 2023 they also won both league titles while the first team came 2nd in their respective league losing 2-1 in a play off final.

In 2025 the club returned to their home ground at Ty-Isaf Park, after 11 years playing in Ystrad Mynach.

== Honours ==
- Ardal SE – Runners-up: 2022–23
- Monmouthshire/Gwent Amateur Cup – Winners: 1985–86
- FAW Reserve League SE – Champions: 2022-23, 2023-24
- FAW Youth League – Champions: 2022-23, 2023-24
- Gwent Premier League County Motors Cup – Winners: 1987–88, 1988–89

== Staff and board members ==
- Chairman : Rob Derraven
- Manager : Scott Oldridge
- Secretary : Stuart Luckwell
- Treasurer : Kerri Oldridge
- Groundsman : Ryan Gingell
