= Porthcawl Town Athletic F.C. =

Association football club in Wales

Porthcawl Town A.F.C.
- Full name: Porthcawl Town Athletic Football Club
- Nickname: Seasiders
- Founded: 1947
- Ground: Locks Lane
- Capacity: 100 Seated
- Chairman: Peter Crofts
- League: South Wales Premier League Premier Division
- 2025–26: South Wales Premier League Premier Division, 7th of 13
Home colours	Away colours

Porthcawl Town Athletic F.C. is a Welsh football club based in the seaside town of Porthcawl in South Wales. The first team play in the South Wales Premier League Premier Division.

In the 1979–80 season the team won the Bridgend & District League and were recommended for membership of the South Wales Corinthian League.

The club were promoted to the Premier Division at the end of the 2018–19 season finishing as champions of Division One.

The club runs three senior men's teams & two youth teams & are affiliated with Porthcawl Town Spartans MAFC.

== Other Teams ==
The reserves play in the Port Talbot & District League Premier Division following promotion in the 22/23 season. The team is managed by Pete Gillet, Sam McCarthy & Curtis Ivin.

The third team play in the Port Talbot & District League First Division. The team is managed by Matthew Allen & Gareth Booth.

In the last 2 years the club has also taken on a youth side. They play in the South Wales Youth League - Roald Dahl Division. The team is managed by Jack Brooks & Paul Black.

== Mental Health Team ==
The club merged in Summer 2020 with Mental Health and disabled club South Wales Spartans, to building Porthcawl Town Spartans MAFC.

== Honours ==
- South Wales Alliance League Division One – Champions: 2018–19
- Port Talbot & District League First Division Challenge Cup Winners: 2022–23 ( 2nd team )
- Port Talbot & District League First Division Winners: 2022–23 ( 2nd team )
- South Wales Amateur League Champions 1989-90
- South Wales Intermediate Cup Winners 1989-90
- Bridgend & District League Champions 1979-80
