= Goytre A.F.C. =

Association football club in Wales

Coordinates: 51°43′53.2″N 2°58′15.7″W

Goytre
- Full name: Goytre Association Football Club
- Founded: 1902
- Ground: Plough Road
- Manager: Dale Clark
- League: Ardal SE League
- 2025–26: Ardal SE League, 3rd of 16
| Home colours | Away colours |

Goytre Association Football Club is a football club is based in the village of Penperlleni, Monmouthshire in South Wales. The team play in the Ardal SE League.

They play at their Plough Road ground which opened in the mid-1990s. The clubhouse has recently been extended to accommodate a function room and further expansion is planned to include a second playing surface and training ground.
