= A.F.C. Llwydcoed =

Association football club in Wales

Coordinates: 51°44′10.3″N 3°27′30.2″W

AFC Llwydcoed
- Full name: Association Football Club Llwydcoed
- Founded: 1931 (as Llwydcoed Welfare)
- Ground: Welfare Ground, Llwydcoed; Aberdare CF44 0UT
- Capacity: 268 (seated)
- Chairman: Ashley Lewis
- Manager: Chris Vardon
- League: Ardal SW League
- 2024–25: Ardal SW League, 13th of 16
Home colours	Away colours

A.F.C. Llywdcoed is a Welsh football club based in the village of Llwydcoed. The club plays in the Ardal SW League. Its home matches are played at the Welfare Ground.

== History ==
A.F.C. Llwydcoed was founded in 1931 as Llwydcoed Welfare. In its early years, the club competed in the Aberdare Valley League and won the division on several occasions during the 1950s. The side later moved into the South Wales Amateur League. The club became a founder member of the South Wales Senior League at the start of the 1991–92 season and changed its name to A.F.C. Llwydcoed at the end of the campaign. Also in the same season, David “Runner” Evans took over as club secretary from Ron James. ‘Dai’ was a tireless worker with plans to start up a thriving mini and juniors section at the club to help with future progress with the first team and to see local children thriving in grassroots football. Under Dai's supervision, Llwydcoed moved from strength to strength with the growth of the mini section and the development of a new home ground. ‘Dai’ stepped back from his role as secretary at the beginning of the 2022–2023 season after over 30 years of service to Llwydcoed. ‘Dai’ is a legend at the club and him, alongside a dedicated committee and a hardworking wife, grew the club massively. He is honoured at the club with the stands at the welfare ground being named, “The Dai Runner Stands.” The side remained in the league for the remainder of the decade, finishing as runners-up during the 1996–97 season in which the team scored 104 goals in 30 matches. The side won promotion two years later, in the 1998–99 season, joining the Third Division of the Welsh Football League.

In its first five seasons in the Welsh Football League, the club won promotion twice, reaching the First Division. Llwydcoed finished third in its first campaign in the division, but were relegated the following season having finished bottom. A second successive relegation a year later dropped the side back to the Third Division. In the 2008–09 season, the club won promotion to the Second Division, scoring 126 times during the campaign.

== Ground ==
Llwydcoed's home fixtures are played at the Welfare Ground in the town. The ground has a double stand holding 268 seats for spectators.
