= Cardiff Grange Harlequins A.F.C. =

Former association football club in Wales

Cardiff Grange Harlequins
- Full name: Cardiff Grange Harlequins Association Football Club
- Nickname(s): The Quins
- Founded: 1935 (as Grange Harlequins)
- Dissolved: 2015 (reformed 2020 as Grangetown Harlequins)
- 2021–22: Cardiff & District League Three, (resigned from league)
Home colours	Away colours

Cardiff Grange Harlequins (known as the 'Quins') are a Welsh football team originating in Grangetown, Cardiff. The team's first choice strip is red shirts, black shorts and red socks. Their second strip is gold and black shirts, black shorts and black socks. They used to play their football at Cardiff Athletics Stadium in Leckwith.

The Quins were formed in 1935, and progressed in the 1990s from 'parks' football into the Welsh League, via the FAW Pyramid system. The club won the Welsh League Challenge Cup in 1995.

In the 2005–06 season, they played in the Welsh Premier League. However, a lack of finances and fan support led to the departure of key players, leaving the club to rely on youth and reserve players. The 'Quins' remained rooted to the bottom of the table, and never looked able to avoid relegation. A second relegation followed in 2006–07, and the club's prospects of returning to the Premier in the short term looked slim.

With the demolition of the old Cardiff Athletics Stadium in 2007 Grange Quins lost their home ground. Because a replacement was not due to be completed until late 2009 the Quins had nowhere to play and, in any case, were considering withdrawing from the Welsh League because of the far higher costs of playing at the new Cardiff International Sports Stadium.

The club had a long-standing rivalry with fellow Cardiff side Cardiff Corinthians which dated back to the 1980s, when both clubs were fierce cross-city rivals and took part in some mouth-watering fixtures. Both clubs have rarely been in the same division, but the rivalry resumed in 2014–15 with the Corinthians relegation to Division 3.

In 2014–15 the Cardiff Grange Harlequins resigned from the Welsh League towards the end of the season and their record was expunged.

The team continued to play in the Cardiff & District League for a season, though with none of the players that played in the Welsh League, using the park facilities at Pontcanna Fields as their home ground. The club folded shortly afterwards. The club was reformed in 2020 as Grangetown Harlequins, playing in the Cardiff & District League Division Three for the 2021–22 season, but withdrew mid-season. The club continues as a junior club.

== Honours ==
- Welsh Football League Division One - Runners-up: 2004–05
- Welsh Football League Division Two - Runners-up: 2002–03
- Welsh Football League Division Three - Runners-up: 1993–94
- South Wales Senior League - Champions: 1992–93
- South Wales Senior League - Runners-up: 1991–92

== Team names ==
- 1935–1999: Grange Harlequins
- 1999–2002: Porto Grange Harlequins
- 2002–2005: Grange Harlequins
- 2005–2006: Cardiff Grange Harlequins
- 2006–2009: Grange Harlequins
- 2009–2010: Cardiff Bay Harlequins
- 2010–2015: Cardiff Grange Harlequins
- 2020–date: Grangetown Harlequins
