= Tredegar Town F.C. =

Association football club in Wales

Coordinates: 51°45′48.3″N 3°14′24.2″W

Tredegar Town
- Full name: Tredegar Town Football Club
- Founded: 1968 (as Rhyd Boys Club)
- Ground: Tredegar Leisure Complex
- Manager: Gareth Harboard
- League: Ardal SE League
- 2025–26: Ardal SE League, 15th of 16
Home colours	Away colours

Tredegar Town Football Club are a football club based in Tredegar, in Wales. The club plays in the Ardal SE League.

== History ==
Source: Tredegar Town AFC was formed in 1968 by its present life president Cliff Bethel to provide a recreation for those young men who preferred playing association football to Rugby Union, the team was originally known as the Rhyd Boys Club and was known throughout Wales for sending players to represent Wales at school boy and Boys Club of Wales level.

In 1983 the team changed to Tredegar Town AFC and moved on to senior level football initially plying their trade in the North Gwent Division One League rising to a Premier Division place in the 1980s.

With the introduction of the Welsh League Pyramid of non-league clubs Tredegar gained a place in the Gwent County FA League and played their games at the Recreation Ground. The team rose from Division 3 to Division 2 then to the top division, then in season 1997–98 they won the Gwent County League and applied to the Welsh League for membership and joined the Welsh Football League in season 1998–99.

After one season they finished runners up in the league and gained promotion to Welsh Football League Division Two in 2000–01 and remained in this division until they were relegated at the end of the 2009–10 season.

== Stadium ==
In August 2004 Tredegar moved from the Recreation Ground to a purpose-built ground at Tredegar Leisure Centre. Lights were added with the help of funding from the Welsh League and the local council.

== Honours ==
- Gwent County League Division 1 Champions – 1997–98
- Gwent County League Division 2 Champions – 1992–93, 1994–95
- Gwent Premier League County Motors Cup – Winners: 1996–97
- Gwent League Challenge Cup – Winners: 2015–16
