= Newport City F.C. =

Association football club in Wales

- Full name: Newport City Football Club
- Nickname: The Steelmen
- Founded: 1963 (as Spencer Works AFC)
- Ground: Newport Stadium, Newport
- Capacity: 5,058 (3,246 seated)
- Chairman: Sam Houldsworth
- Manager: Robbie Willmott
- League: Cymru South
- 2025–26: Cymru South, 10th of 16
- Website: http://www.newportcityfc.co.uk
Home colours	Away colours

Newport City Football Club (Welsh: Clwb Pêl-droed Dinas Casnewydd) is an association football club based in the city of Newport, South Wales. The club plays in the Cymru South league.

== History ==
The club was formed in 1963 as Spencer Works AFC and joined the Newport and District Football League.

The club eventually moved up to Gwent Premier League, winning it in 1970–71 and 1971–72 and then elected to the Welsh league for the 1972–73 season.

They spent most of the next twenty seasons in the middle division of the league until 1988, when they changed their name to Llanwern AFC to reflect the change of name of the steelworks on whose ground they played. This change coincided with a change in the club's fortunes, and they gained promotion to the top division in 1992–93.

As Llanwern AFC, they spent a number of years between the top two divisions, and in 2002 they won the Welsh Football League Cup.

In 2003, they re-located to the Newport Stadium, at the time sharing with nearby neighbours Newport County, where they have played ever since.

League re-organisation led to the club dropping to Division Three in 2010–11, spending two seasons there before promotion back to Division Two for the 2014–15 season.

In May 2016, the FAW agreed that the club could change its name to Newport City FC for the 2016–17 season.

With the club being saved at the last minute by Matthew Rake (now Honorary President) they had to look at a rebuild with the squad not at a level to compete in League 2. The club at the time was being led by Crawford Chalmers, who was also a Director of Football at Oxford United. With no experience in Welsh League football, Crawford's tenure saw the side drop to rock bottom of the division. The club bought in Sam Houldsworth as joint manager after a successful period as Assistant at Pontypridd Town. Houldsworth helped land an unexpected 3–2 victory away to Abergavenny Town in his first game, the team's first win in seven games. A huge revamp of players and staff was not enough to save the club from relegation from Division 2 after a valiant attempt at survival, being adrift by 16 points of safety when Houldsworth was appointed.

A successful 2023–24 season saw the side win the FAW Trophy after a 5-4 win over Penrhyncoch. City finished second in the 2023–24 Ardal South East and qualified for a Playoff against Ardal South West side Cefn Cribwr. Played at the home of Penybont, Newport beat the Bridgend-based side 2-0 to earn promotion to the second-tier Cymru South for the first time in their history.

In 2024-25, the team achieved their highest ever finish by placing third in the Cymru South.

== Current squad ==
As of April 2025.

Note: Flags indicate national team as defined under FIFA eligibility rules; some limited exceptions apply. Players may hold more than one non-FIFA nationality.

No.	Pos.	Nation	Player
—	GK	WAL	Cohen Riella
—	GK	WAL	Edward King
—	GK	WAL	Keiron Blackburn
—	DF	WAL	Luke Cooper (Captain)
—	DF	WAL	Evan Cadwallader
—	DF	WAL	Lathan Garrett
—	DF	WAL	Adam Ward
—	DF	WAL	Harvey Sing
—	DF	WAL	Clayton Farrah
—	MF	WAL	James Bloom
—	MF	WAL	Eduardo Bregua

No.	Pos.	Nation	Player
—	MF	WAL	Danny Hillman
—	MF	WAL	Cole Mace
—	MF	WAL	Kai Steadman
—	MF	WAL	Solomon Taylor St. Clair
—	FW	WAL	Josh Graham
—	FW	WAL	Rhys Kavanagh
—	FW	WAL	Charlie Davies
—	FW	WAL	George Kabza
—	FW	WAL	Drew Perrett
—	FW	WAL	McKenzie Thompson

== Staff and board members ==
Position	Staff
Chairman	Sam Houldsworth
Manager	Robbie Willmott
Assistant Coaches	Tom Hooper Laurie Marsh

== Honours ==
- Ardal South East
  - Runners-up: 2023–24
- FAW Trophy
  - Winners: 2023–24
- FAW Youth League South East
  - Winners: 2024–25
