= List of football clubs in Wales =

This is a list of football clubs that compete within the leagues and divisions of the Welsh football league system as far down as Level 4, that is to say, down to the first division of the Welsh Regional Leagues. The relative levels of divisions can be compared on the Welsh football league system page.

== List of leagues and divisions ==
- Cymru Premier (Level 1)
- Cymru North / Cymru South (Level 2)
- Ardal Leagues Northeast / Northwest / Southeast / Southwest (Level 3)

Below these, there are the regional feeders (starting at Level 4):

- Gwent County League Premier (there are also a Division One and Two at Levels 5 & 6)
- Mid Wales Football League East / West
- North East Wales Football League Premier (there is also a championship at Level 5)
- North Wales Coast East Football League Premier (there is also a Division One at Level 5)
- North Wales Coast West Football League Premier (there is also a Division One at Level 5)
- South Wales Alliance League Premier (there are also a Division One and Two at Levels 5 & 6)
- West Wales Premier League

== Alphabetical list of clubs ==
=== Key ===
Key to divisional change
New Club
Club was promoted to a higher Level
Club was transferred between divisions at the same Level
Club resigned or was demoted to a lower Level
Club was relegated to a lower Level

=== A ===
| Club | League/Division | Lvl | Nickname | Change from 2020 to 2021 |
|---|---|---|---|---|
| A.F.C. Llwydcoed | Ardal South West | 3 | | |
| Aber Valley | South Wales Alliance League Premier | 4 | | |
| Aberaeron | Ceridigion League Division 2 | 6 | Black and Ambers | |
| Aberbargoed Buds | Ardal South East | 3 | Buds | |
| Abercarn United | Gwent County League Premier | 4 | | |
| Aberdare Town | South Wales Alliance League Premier | 4 | | |
| Aberffraw | North Wales Coast West League Premier | 4 | | |
| Abergavenny Town | Ardal South East | 3 | Pennies | |
| Abermule | Mid Wales League East | 4 | Mule | |
| Aberystwyth Town | Cymru South | 2 | Seasiders | |
| Aberystwyth University | Mid Wales League West | 4 | Students | |
| Abertillery Bluebirds | Ardal South East | 3 | Bluebirds | |
| Abertillery Excelsiors | Ardal South East | 3 | Excelsiors | |
| AC Pontymister | Gwent County League Premier | 4 | | |
| Afan Lido | Cymru South | 2 | | |
| Airbus UK Broughton | Cymru North | 2 | Wingmakers | |
| Albion Rovers | Gwent County League Premier | 4 | | |
| Amlwch Town | North Wales Coast West League Premier | 4 | Town | |
| Ammanford | Cymru South | 2 | | |

=== B ===
| Club | League/Division | Lvl | Nickname | Change from 2020 to 2021 |
|---|---|---|---|---|
| Baglan Dragons | South Wales Alliance League Premier | 4 | | |
| Bala Town | 2021–22 Cymru Premier | 1 | Lakesiders | |
| Bangor 1876 | North Wales Coast West League Premier | 4 | | |
| Bangor City | Cymru North | 2 | Citizens | |
| Barmouth & Dyffryn United | Mid Wales League West | 4 | Magpies | |
| Barry Town United | 2021–22 Cymru Premier | 1 | Linnets | |
| Berriew | Ardal North East | 3 | Rhiewsiders | |
| Bishops Castle Town | Mid Wales League East | 4 | Castle | |
| Blaenau Ffestiniog Amateur | Ardal North West | 3 | Quarrymen | |
| Blaenavon Blues | Gwent County League Premier | 4 | | |
| Blaenrhondda | South Wales Alliance League Premier | 4 | | |
| Bodedern Athletic | North Wales Coast West League Premier | 4 | Boded | |
| Bow Street | Ardal North East | 3 | Magpies | |
| Brecon Corinthians | Mid Wales League East | 4 | Corries | |
| Brickfield Rangers | Ardal North West | 3 | | |
| Bridgend Street | South Wales Alliance League Premier | 4 | The Mission | |
| Briton Ferry Llansawel | Cymru South | 2 | Ferry | |
| Bro Cernyw | North Wales Coast East League Premier | 4 | | |
| Brymbo | Ardal North West | 3 | Steelmen | |
| Buckley Town | Cymru North | 2 | Bucks | |
| Builth Wells | Mid Wales League East | 4 | Bulls | |

=== C ===
| Club | League/Division | Lvl | Nickname | Change from 2020 to 2021 |
|---|---|---|---|---|
| Caerau (Ely) | Ardal South West | 3 | Young Guns | |
| Caerleon | Gwent County League Premier | 4 | Romans | |
| Caernarfon Town | 2021–22 Cymru Premier | 1 | Canaries | |
| Caersws | Ardal North East | 3 | Bluebirds | |
| Caldicot Town | Ardal South East | 3 | | |
| Cambrian & Clydach Vale B.G.C. | Cymru South | 2 | | |
| Canton Liberal | South Wales Alliance League Premier | 4 | | |
| Cardiff Corinthians | South Wales Alliance League Premier | 4 | Corries | |
| Cardiff Draconians | Ardal South West | 3 | Dracs | |
| Cardiff Met | 2021–22 Cymru Premier | 1 | Archers | |
| Carno | Ardal North East | 3 | Greens | |
| Carmarthen Town | Cymru South | 2 | Old Gold | |
| Castell Alun Colts | North East Wales League Premier | 4 | | |
| Cefn Albion | Ardal North East | 3 | | |
| Cefn Cribwr | South Wales Alliance League Premier | 4 | Riders | |
| Cefn Druids | 2021–22 Cymru Premier | 1 | Druids | |
| Cefn Mawr Rangers | North East Wales League Premier | 4 | Rangers | |
| Chepstow Town | Ardal South East | 3 | | |
| Chirk AAA | Ardal North East | 3 | Colliers | |
| Chirk Town | North East Wales League Premier | 4 | | |
| Churchstoke | Mid Wales League East | 4 | Marketmen | |
| CK Swiss Valley | West Wales Premier League | 4 | | |
| Coedpoeth United | North East Wales League Premier | 4 | | |
| Colwyn Bay | Cymru North | 2 | Seagulls | |
| Connah's Quay Nomads | 2021–22 Cymru Premier | 1 | Nomads | |
| Conwy Borough | Cymru North | 2 | Tangarines | |
| Corwen | Ardal North East | 3 | | |
| Croesyceiliog | Ardal South East | 3 | | |
| Cwm Wanderers | West Wales Premier League | 4 | | |
| Cwmamman United | Ardal South West | 3 | | |
| Cwmbran Celtic | Cymru South | 2 | Celts | |
| Cwmbrân Town | Gwent County League Premier | 4 | Crows | |

=== D ===
| Club | League/Division | Lvl | Nickname | Change from 2020 to 2021 |
|---|---|---|---|---|
| Dafen Welfare | West Wales Premier League | 4 | Bluebirds | |
| Denbigh Town | Ardal North West | 3 | Reds | |
| Dinas Powys | Ardal South West | 3 | | |
| Dolgellau Athletic | Ardal North East | 3 | Wasps | |
| Dyffryn Banw | Mid Wales League West | 4 | Banw | |

=== E ===
| Club | League/Division | Lvl | Nickname | Change from 2020 to 2021 |
|---|---|---|---|---|
| Evans & Williams | West Wales Premier League | 4 | Albies | |

=== F ===
| Club | League/Division | Lvl | Nickname | Change from 2020 to 2021 |
|---|---|---|---|---|
| F.C. Queens Park | North East Wales League Premier | 4 | | |
| F.C. Cwmaman | South Wales Alliance League Premier | 4 | Corries | |
| Flint Town United | 2021–22 Cymru Premier | 1 | Silkmen | |
| Forden United | Mid Wales League East | 4 | United | |
| Four Crosses | Ardal North East | 3 | Crosses | |

=== G ===
| Club | League/Division | Lvl | Nickname | Change from 2020 to 2021 |
|---|---|---|---|---|
| Gaerwen | North Wales Coast West League Premier | 4 | | |
| Garden Village | Ardal South West | 3 | Canaries | |
| Garw S.B.G.C. | South Wales Alliance League Premier | 4 | | |
| Giants Grave | West Wales Premier League | 4 | Albies | |
| Glan Conwy | North Wales Coast East League Premier | 4 | | |
| Goytre | Ardal South East | 3 | | |
| Goytre United | Cymru South | 2 | | |
| Graig Villa Dino | Gwent County League Premier | 4 | | |
| Grange Albion | South Wales Alliance League Premier | 4 | | |
| Greenfield | North East Wales League Premier | 4 | | |
| Gresford Athletic | Cymru North | 2 | Colliers | |
| Guilsfield | Cymru North | 2 | Guils | |
| Gwalchmai | North Wales Coast West League Premier | 4 | | |

=== H ===
| Club | League/Division | Lvl | Nickname | Change from 2020 to 2021 |
|---|---|---|---|---|
| Halkyn & Flint Mountain | North East Wales League Premier | 4 | Mountain | |
| Haverfordwest County | 2021–22 Cymru Premier | 1 | Bluebirds | |
| Hawarden Rangers | North East Wales League Premier | 4 | | |
| Hay St Marys | Mid Wales League East | 4 | Saints | |
| Holyhead Hotspur | Cymru North | 2 | Hotspurs | |
| Holywell Town | Cymru North | 2 | Wellmen | |

=== K ===
| Club | League/Division | Lvl | Nickname | Change from 2020 to 2021 |
|---|---|---|---|---|
| Kerry | Ardal North East | 3 | Lambs | |
| Kinmel Bay | North Wales Coast East League Premier | 4 | | |
| Knighton Town | Mid Wales League East | 4 | Robins | |

=== L ===
| Club | League/Division | Lvl | Nickname | Change from 2020 to 2021 |
|---|---|---|---|---|
| Lex Glyndwr XI | North East Wales League Premier | 4 | Lawmen | |
| Llanberis | North Wales Coast West League Premier | 4 | Y Darans | |
| Llandrindod Wells | Ardal South East | 3 | Spamen | |
| Llandudno Albion | Ardal North West | 3 | Albion | |
| Llandudno | Cymru North | 2 | Seasiders | |
| Llandudno Junction | North Wales Coast East League Premier | 4 | Railwaymen | |
| Llandyrnog United | North Wales Coast East League Premier | 4 | Dyrny | |
| Llanelli Town | Cymru South | 2 | Reds | |
| Llanfair United | Ardal North East | 3 | | |
| Llanfairfechan Town | North Wales Coast East League Premier | 4 | | |
| Llanfyllin Town | Mid Wales League East | 4 | Magpies | |
| Llangefni Town | Cymru North | 2 | Dazzlers | |
| Llangollen Town | North East Wales League Premier | 4 | Town | |
| Llanidloes Town | Cymru North | 2 | Daffodils | |
| Llannefydd | North Wales Coast East League Premier | 4 | | |
| Llanrhaeadr | Cymru North | 2 | | |
| Llanrug United | North Wales Coast West League Premier | 4 | | |
| Llanrumney United | South Wales Alliance League Premier | 4 | | |
| Llanrwst United | Ardal North West | 3 | Rwsters | |
| Llansannan | North Wales Coast East League Premier | 4 | | |
| Llansantffraid Village | Mid Wales League East | 4 | Saints | |
| Llantwit Major | Cymru South | 2 | | |
| Llanuwchllyn | Ardal North West | 3 | | |
| Llay Welfare | Ardal North West | 3 | Welly | |
| Lliswerry | Gwent County League Premier | 4 | | |
| Lucas Cwmbran | Gwent County League Premier | 4 | Brakemen | |

=== M ===
| Club | League/Division | Lvl | Nickname | Change from 2020 to 2021 |
|---|---|---|---|---|
| Machynlleth | Ardal North East | 3 | | |
| Meliden | North Wales Coast East League Premier | 4 | Miners | |
| Menai Bridge Tigers | North Wales Coast West League Premier | 4 | Tigers | |
| Merthyr Saints | South Wales Alliance League Premier | 4 | Saints | |
| Mochdre Sports | North Wales Coast East League Premier | 4 | Miners | |
| Mold Alexandra | Ardal North West | 3 | | |
| Monmouth Town | Ardal South East | 3 | Kingfishers | |
| Montgomery Town | Mid Wales League East | 4 | Canaries | |
| Morriston Town | West Wales Premier League | 4 | | |
| Mumbles Rangers | West Wales Premier League | 4 | | |
| Mynydd Isa Spartans | North East Wales League Premier | 4 | Spartans | |
| Mynydd Llandegai | North Wales Coast West League Premier | 4 | | |

=== N ===
| Club | League/Division | Lvl | Nickname | Change from 2020 to 2021 |
|---|---|---|---|---|
| Nantlle Vale | Ardal North West | 3 | | |
| Nefyn United | North Wales Coast West League Premier | 4 | Y Penwaig | |
| New Brighton Villa | North East Wales League Premier | 4 | Yellers | |
| Newcastle Emlyn | Mid Wales League West | 4 | | |
| Newport City | Ardal South East | 3 | Steelmen | |
| Newtown | 2021–22 Cymru Premier | 1 | Robins | |
| Newtown Wanderers | Mid Wales League East | 4 | | |
| Newport Civil Service | Gwent County League Premier | 4 | Civil | |
| Newport Corinthians | Gwent County League Premier | 4 | | |

=== O ===
| Club | League/Division | Lvl | Nickname | Change from 2020 to 2021 |
|---|---|---|---|---|
| Overton Recreation | North East Wales League Premier | 4 | O's | |

=== P ===
| Club | League/Division | Lvl | Nickname | Change from 2020 to 2021 |
|---|---|---|---|---|
| Panteg | Ardal South East | 3 | Black and Whites | |
| Pencoed Athletic | South Wales Alliance League Premier | 4 | | |
| Penlan Club | West Wales Premier League | 4 | | |
| Penmaenmawr Phoenix | North Wales Coast East League Premier | 4 | Phoenix | |
| Penparcau | Ardal North East | 3 | Arky | |
| Penrhiwceiber Rangers | Ardal South West | 3 | | |
| Penrhyncoch | Cymru North | 2 | Roosters | |
| Penrhyndeudraeth | North Wales Coast West League Premier | 4 | Cockles | |
| Pentraeth | North Wales Coast West League Premier | 4 | | |
| Penybont | 2021–22 Cymru Premier | 1 | | |
| Pen-y-cae | Ardal North East | 3 | Cae | |
| Penydarren B.G.C. | Ardal South West | 3 | Pen | |
| Pill YMCA | Gwent County League Premier | 4 | | |
| Pontardawe Town | Ardal South West | 3 | | |
| Pontarddulais Town | West Wales Premier League | 4 | Bont | |
| Pontyclun | Ardal South West | 3 | Clun | |
| Pontypridd Town | Cymru South | 2 | Dragons | |
| Port Talbot Town | Cymru South | 2 | Steelmen | |
| Porthcawl Town | South Wales Alliance League Premier | 4 | Seasiders | |
| Porthmadog | Ardal North West | 3 | Port | |
| Prestatyn Sports | North Wales Coast East League Premier | 4 | | |
| Prestatyn Town | Cymru North | 2 | Seasiders | |
| Pwllheli | North Wales Coast West League Premier | 4 | Lillywhites | |

=== R ===
| Club | League/Division | Lvl | Nickname | Change from 2020 to 2021 |
|---|---|---|---|---|
| Radnor Valley | Mid Wales League East | 4 | Goats | |
| Rhuddlan Town | North Wales Coast East League Premier | 4 | Town | |
| Rhayader Town | Ardal South East | 3 | Thin Red Line | |
| Rhos Aelwyd | Ardal North East | 3 | | |
| Rhostyllen | Ardal North West | 3 | Rhos | |
| Rhydymwyn | Ardal North West | 3 | Rhyd | |
| Risca United | Cymru South | 2 | Cuckoos | |
| Rogerstone | Gwent County League Premier | 4 | Welfare | |
| RTB Ebbw Vale | Gwent County League Premier | 4 | Ts | |
| Ruthin Town | Cymru North | 2 | Town | |

=== S ===
| Club | League/Division | Lvl | Nickname | Change from 2020 to 2021 |
|---|---|---|---|---|
| Saltney Town | Ardal North West | 3 | Bordermen | |
| Seven Sisters Onllwyn | West Wales Premier League | 4 | Green Army | |
| South Gower | West Wales Premier League | 4 | | |
| St Asaph City | Ardal North West | 3 | | |
| Swansea University | Cymru South | 2 | | |

=== T ===
| Club | League/Division | Lvl | Nickname | Change from 2020 to 2021 |
|---|---|---|---|---|
| Taff's Well | Cymru South | 2 | Wellmen | |
| The New Saints | 2021–22 Cymru Premier | 1 | Saints | |
| Ton Pentre | Ardal South West | 3 | Rhondda Bulldogs | |
| Trebanog | South Wales Alliance League Premier | 4 | | |
| Tredegar Town | Ardal South East | 3 | | |
| Trefelin B.G.C. | Cymru South | 2 | | |
| Tregaron Turfs | Mid Wales League West | 4 | | |
| Treharris Athletic Western | Ardal South West | 3 | Lilywhites | |
| Treowen Stars | Ardal South East | 3 | Stars | |
| Trethomas Bluebirds | Ardal South East | 3 | Bluebirds | |
| Trewern United | Central Wales North Division | 4 | Tigers | |
| Tywyn & Bryncrug | Mid Wales League West | 4 | | |

=== U ===
| Club | League/Division | Lvl | Nickname | Change from 2020 to 2021 |
|---|---|---|---|---|
| Undy Athletic | Cymru South | 2 | Tigers | |

=== W ===
| Club | League/Division | Lvl | Nickname | Change from 2020 to 2021 |
|---|---|---|---|---|
| Waterloo Rovers | Mid Wales League East | 4 | Rovers | |
| Wattsville | Gwent County League Premier | 4 | Ville | |
| Welshpool Town | Ardal North East | 3 | Lillywhites | |
| West End | Ardal South West | 3 | | |

=== Y ===
| Club | League/Division | Lvl | Nickname | Change from 2020 to 2021 |
|---|---|---|---|---|
| Y Felinheli | Ardal North West | 3 | | |
| Y Rhyl 1879 | North Wales Coast East League Premier | 4 | Lilywhites | |
| Ynysddu Welfare | Gwent County League Premier | 4 | | |
| Ynyshir Albions | Ardal South West | 3 | Buns | |
| Ynysygerwn | Ardal South West | 3 | | |
