= 2011–12 Welsh Cup =

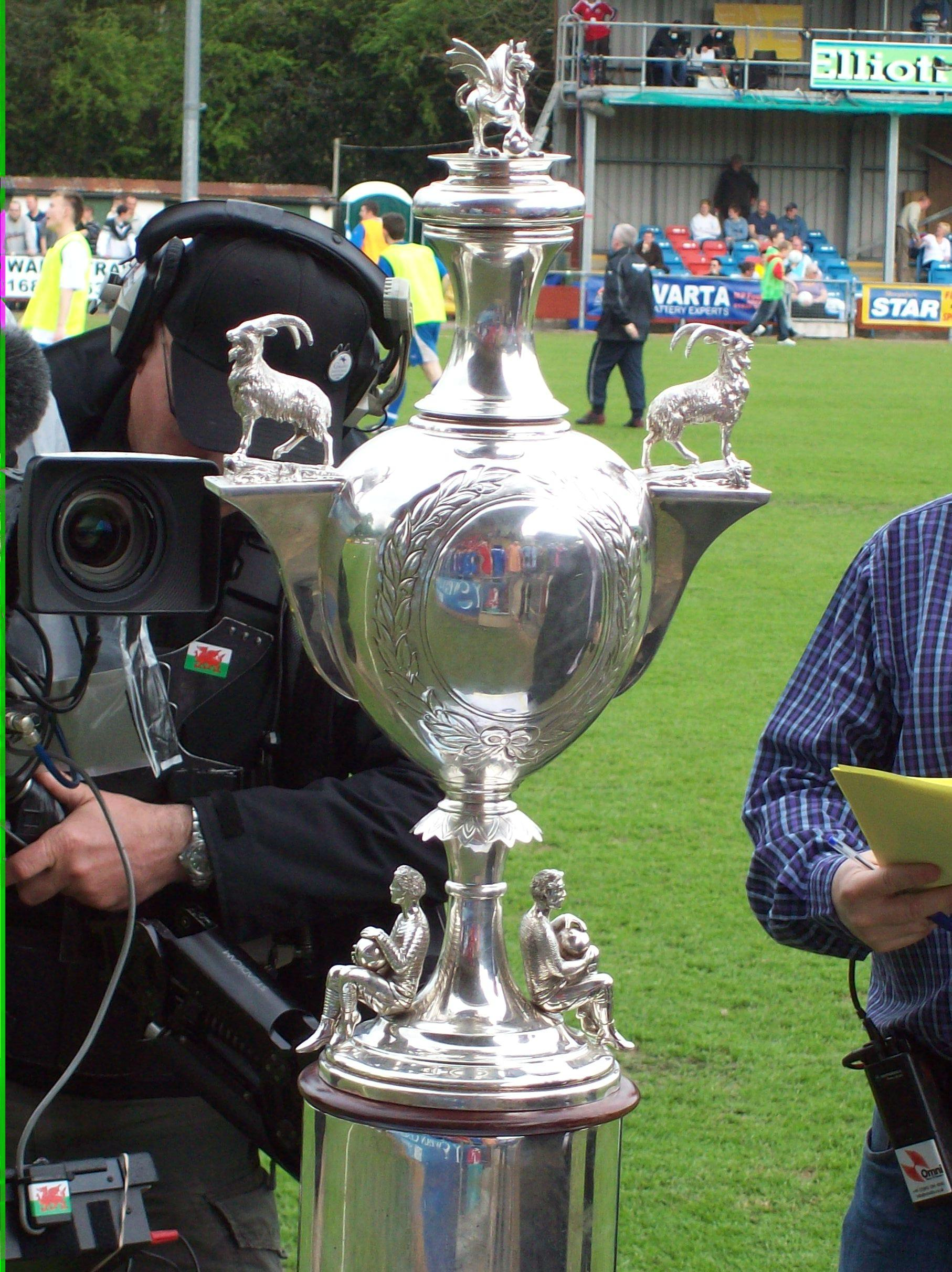
- The Welsh Cup

Tournament details
- Country: Wales
- Teams: 190

Final positions
- Champions: The New Saints
- Runners-up: Cefn Druids

The 2011–12 FAW Welsh Cup was the 125th season of the annual knockout tournament for competitive football teams in Wales. The 2011–12 tournament commenced on 13 August 2011, and ran until the final in May 2012. The winner of the Cup qualified to the first qualifying round of the 2012–13 UEFA Europa League.

The 2011–12 Welsh Cup saw the return of Western League side Merthyr Town and Conference National sides Newport County and Wrexham. Football League side Cardiff City, Conference North side Colwyn Bay, and Premier League side Swansea City rejected the invitation to participate in this season's Welsh Cup. Nevertheless, the UEFA barred these teams from competing in the Europa League even if they had won.

== Qualifying round 1 ==
Qualifying Round 1 will be played on either Saturday 13 or Sunday 14 August 2011.

=== North ===
Team 1	Score	Team 2
Acrefair Youth	0–4	Coedpoeth United
Amlwch Town	0–5	Rhydymwyn
Barmouth & Dyffryn United	3–1	Aberdyfi
Bethel	1–2	Caernarfon Wanderers
Blaenau Ffestiniog	3–7	Caernarfon Town
Bow Street	1–9	Mold Alexandra
Brymbo	0–1	Penmaenmawr Phoenix
Builth Wells	3–2	Llanberis
Carno	4–2	Trearddur Bay
Connah's Quay Town	3–1	Kerry
Dyffryn Nantle Vale	1–2	Llanllyfni
Connah's Quay Nomads	3–2	Llay Miners Welfare
Gaerwen	2–1 (aet)	Llandudno Junction
Glan Conwy	4–1	Overton Recreational
Greenfield	0–4	FC Cefn
Gwalchmai	6–4 (aet)	Dolgellau Athletic
Johnstown Youth	1–3	Llandrindod Wells
Kinmel Bay Sports	1–1 (4–5 pen.)	Chirk AAA
Llandyrnog United	1–0	Holywell Town
Llanfyllin	1–5	Brickfield Rangers
Llanrwst United	0–1	Llangollen United
Llanystumdwy	2–6	Bro Goronwy
Montgomery Town	8–0	Machynlleth
Nefyn United	5–0	Presteigne St Andrews
Penyffordd	2–5	Glantraeth
Pontrhydfendigaid	4–2	Castell Alun Colts
Pwllheli	1–3	Llanrug United
Rhayader Town	3–3 (2–3 pen.)	Hawarden Rangers
Rhosgoch Rangers	2–1	Halkyn United
Tregaron Turfs	0–4	Llanfair United
Tywyn Bryncrug	3–2 (aet)	Llanfair PG
Venture Community	3–0	Bodedern
Waterloo Rovers	1–3	Berriew

=== South ===
Team 1	Score	Team 2
Aber Valley YMCA	8–3	Garw
Abercarn United	8–3	Llanharry
AFC Abercynon	w/o	Perthcelyn
AFC Llwydcoed	3–1	Croesyceiliog
Bettws	0–4	Trefelin
Brecon Corries	1–6	Undy Athletic
Bridgend Street	2–0	Treforest
Briton Ferry Llansawel	3–1	Treharris Athletic Western
Cadoxton Barry	0–1	UWIC
Cardiff Hibernian	0–2	Caerau
Cornelly United	0–6	Ely Rangers
Cwmbran Town	2–1	Hirwaun Welfare/Mackworth
Dinas Powys	6–1	Blaenrhondda
Ferndale	w/o	Goytre
Graig	4–5 (aet)	STM Sports
Kenfig Hill	1–1 (2–4 pen.)	Caerleon
Llangeinor	2–4 (aet)	Merthyr Saints
Llantwit Fardre	2–1	Baglan Dragons
Llanwern	1–2	Fleur de Lys Welfare
Newport Civil Service	3–2	Cwmamman United
Penrhiwceiber Constitutional	1–3	Aberbargoed Buds
Penrhiwceiber Rangers	2–5	Aberaeron
Pentwynmawr Athletic	0–5	Abertillery Bluebirds
Pontyclun	2–0	Penygraig
Talgarth Town	2–3	Nelson Cavaliers
Tata Steel	3–2	Carnetown
Tonyrefail	3–2 (aet)	RTB Ebbw Vale
Tredegar Athletic	0–3	Risca United
Tredegar Town	3–2	Cardiff Grange Harlequins
Treowen Stars	4–3 (aet)	Pontypridd Town
Trethomas Bluebirds	0–1 (aet)	Splott Albion

== Qualifying round 2 ==
Qualifying Round 2 was played on either Saturday 3 or Sunday 4 September 2011.

=== North ===
Team 1	Score	Team 2
Barmouth & Dyffryn	4–1	Hawarden Rangers
Brickfield Rangers	1–4	Builth Wells
Caernarfon Town	8–0	Penmaenmawr Phoenix
Caernarfon Wanderers	1–5	Bethesda Athletic
Chirk AAA	1–0	Berriew
Coedpoeth United	5–1	Gaerwen
FC Cefn	3–1 (aet)	Connah's Quay Nomads F.C.
Glantraeth	9–0	Pontrhydfendigaid
Gresford Athletic	3–2 (aet)	Mold Alexandra
Gwalchmai	3–2	Llansantffraid Village
Holyhead Hotspur	4–3 (aet)	Llanfair United
Lex XI	1–3	Connah's Quay Town
Llandyrnog United	1–2	Llanrug United
Llangollen United	1–2	Carno
Llanidloes Town	4–3	Glan Conwy
Llanllyfni	0–3	Venture Community
Montgomery Town	5–0	Bro Goronwy
Nefyn United F.C.	2–3	Llandrindod Wells
Rhydymwyn	0–5	Denbigh Town
Rhosgoch Rangers	2–1	Corwen Amateurs
Rhydymwyn	1–3	Newbridge-on-Wye

=== South ===
Team 1	Score	Team 2
Aber Valley YMCA	3–6	Abertillery Bluebirds
Aberbargoed Buds	4–0	Abercarn United
Ammanford	1–3	Dinas Powys
Bridgend Street	2–3	UWIC
Briton Ferry Llansawel	0–1	Tata Steel
Caerleon	2–0	Newport YMCA
Cwmbran Town	3–1	Pontyclun
Fleur de Lys Welfare	3–5	Undy Athletic
Garden Village	1–1 (2–4 pen.)	Caldicot Town
Goytre	1–0	Llantwit Fardre
Merthyr Town	5–1	Caerau
Monmouth Town	6–2	Tredegar Town
Nelson Cavaliers	0–6	Aberaeron
Newcastle Emlyn	0–0 (4–2 pen.)	Ely Rangers
Perthcelyn United	5–6 (aet)	Merthyr Saints
Risca United	4–0	Tonyrefail
Splott Albion	1–0	AFC Llwydcoed
STM Sports	2–3	Newport Civil Service
Trefelin	1–2	Treowen Stars

== Round 1 ==
Round 1 was played on either Saturday 1 or Sunday 2 October 2011.

=== North ===
Team 1	Score	Team 2
Barmouth & Dyffryn	4–1	Ruthin Town
Buckley Town	4–0	Penrhyncoch
Caersws	1–1 (4–2 pen.)	Conwy United
Carno	0–2	Coedpoeth United
Cefn Druids	6–1	Caernarfon Town
Flint Town United	5–1	Chirk AAA
Connah's Quay Nomads	7–2	Gwalchmai
Llandrindod Wells	3–3 (4–1 pen.)	Llanrug United
Llangefni Town	2–3 (aet)	Denbigh Town
Llanidloes Town	4–3	Glantraeth
Llanrhaeadr ym Mochnant	1–6	Holyhead Hotspur
Montgomery Town	4–0	Connah's Quay Town
Penycae	1–2	FC Cefn
Porthmadog	3–1	Bethesda Athletic
Rhos Aelwyd	0–1	Guilsfield
Rhyl	5–0	Gresford Athletic
Venture Community	1–3	Llandudno Town

=== South ===
Team 1	Score	Team 2
Abertillery Bluebirds	0–2	Caerau
AFC Porth	2–0	Aberbargoed Buds
Bridgend Town	2–0	Splott Albion
Bryntirion Athletic	3–1	Cwmbran Town
Caerleon	1–0	Aberaman Athletic
Caldicot Town	2–4	Newport Civil Service
Cambrian & Clydach	5–1	Monmouth Town
Cardiff Corinthians	2–0	Cwmaman Institute
Dinas Powys	0–2	Builth Wells
Goytre	3–1	Aberaeron
Goytre United	1–0	Ton Pentre
Merthyr Town	0–3	Barry Town
Pontardawe Town	3–0	Treowen Stars
Rhosgoch Rangers	2–6	Merthyr Saints
Risca United	0–4	Newbridge-on-Wye
Taff's Well	5–4 (aet)	Undy Athletic
Tata Steel	3–1	Newcastle Emlyn
UWIC	0–2	Haverfordwest County
West End	2–0	Cwmbran Celtic

== Round 2 ==
Round 2 was played on either Saturday 5 or Sunday 6 November 2011.

=== North ===
Team 1	Score	Team 2
Barmouth & Dyffryn	0–3	Caersws
Buckley Town	5–2	Holyhead Hotspur
Cefn Druids	8–0	Coedpoeth United
Denbigh Town	1–2 (a.e.t.)	Flint Town United
Guilsfield	1–3	Llandudno Town
Llanidloes Town	0–2	Connah's Quay Nomads
Montgomery Town	3–7	FC Cefn
Porthmadog	2–3	Rhyl

=== South ===
Team 1	Score	Team 2
AFC Porth	3–0	Pontardawe Town
Bridgend Town	5–3	Tata Steel
Bryntirion Athletic	5–2	Goytre
Builth Wells	0–5	Taff's Well
Caerau	1–8	Goytre United
Caerleon	3–4	Merthyr Saints
Cambrian & Clydach	2–0	Llandrindod Wells
Haverfordwest County	1–2 (a.e.t.)	Barry Town
Newport Civil Service	2–0	Newbridge-on-Wye
West End	2–1	Cardiff Corinthians

== Round 3 ==
Round 3 was played on either Saturday 3 or Sunday 4 December 2011.

Team 1	Score	Team 2
Flint Town United	3–0	Newport Civil Service
Port Talbot Town	0–1	Afan Lido
The New Saints	6–0	Bryntirion Athletic
AFC Porth	0–0 (4–3 pen.)	Cambrian & Clydach
Wrexham	1–2 (a.e.t.)	Airbus UK Broughton
Carmarthen Town	2–1	Bridgend Town
Caersws	0–1	Llandudno Town
Buckley Town	4–3	Taff's Well
Neath	4–0	West End
FC Cefn	1–6	Aberystwyth Town
Newtown	1–2	Rhyl
Bangor City	2–4	Llanelli
Prestatyn Town	6–2	Goytre United
Newport County	3–2	Barry Town
Connah's Quay Nomads	1–2	Cefn Druids
Merthyr Saints	0–6	Bala Town

== Round 4 ==
Round 4 was played on either Saturday 28 or Sunday 29 January 2012.

Team 1	Score	Team 2
Rhyl	3−3 (4–5 pen.)	Llanelli
Afan Lido	2−2 (4–5 pen.)	Airbus UK Broughton
Buckley Town	2−4 (a.e.t.)	Bala Town
Flint Town United	1−3	Neath
Aberystwyth Town	1−1 (5–4 pen.)	Llandudno Town
The New Saints	4−0	Newport County
Prestatyn Town	0−2	Cefn Druids
Carmarthen Town	3−1 (a.e.t.)	AFC Porth

== Quarter-finals ==
Quarter Finals was played on Saturday 25 February 2012.

25 February 2012
12:30

The New Saints	1–0	Neath
Draper 37'

Park Hall, Oswestry

25 February 2012
14:30

Aberystwyth Town	0–1	Cefn Druids
		43' Cann

Park Avenue, Aberystwyth

25 February 2012
14:30

Airbus UK Broughton	3–1	Carmarthen Town
Worton 15'; Thompson 62'; Hayes 88'		78' Harrhy

The Airfield, Broughton

25 February 2012
14:30

Bala Town	1–1 (a.e.t.)	Llanelli
Hunt 51'		41' Venables
Penalties
	5–4

Maes Tegid, Bala

== Semi-finals ==
The Semi-finals were played on Saturday 31 March 2012.

31 March 2012
12:30

Airbus UK Broughton	1–4	Cefn Druids
Hesp 51' (o.g.)		24' Cann; 39', 55', 80' Swarbrick

Belle Vue, Rhyl
Attendance: 252

31 March 2012
15:00

Bala Town	0–4	The New Saints
		8' Ward; 12' Draper; 26' Fraughan; 62' Edwards

Maes Tegid, Bala

== Final ==
5 May 2012
14:00 BST

Cefn Druids	0–2	The New Saints
	BBC Sport	Draper 14'; Darlington 15'

Nanporth Stadium, Bangor
Attendance: 731
Referee: Kevin Parry
