= 2014–15 Welsh Cup =

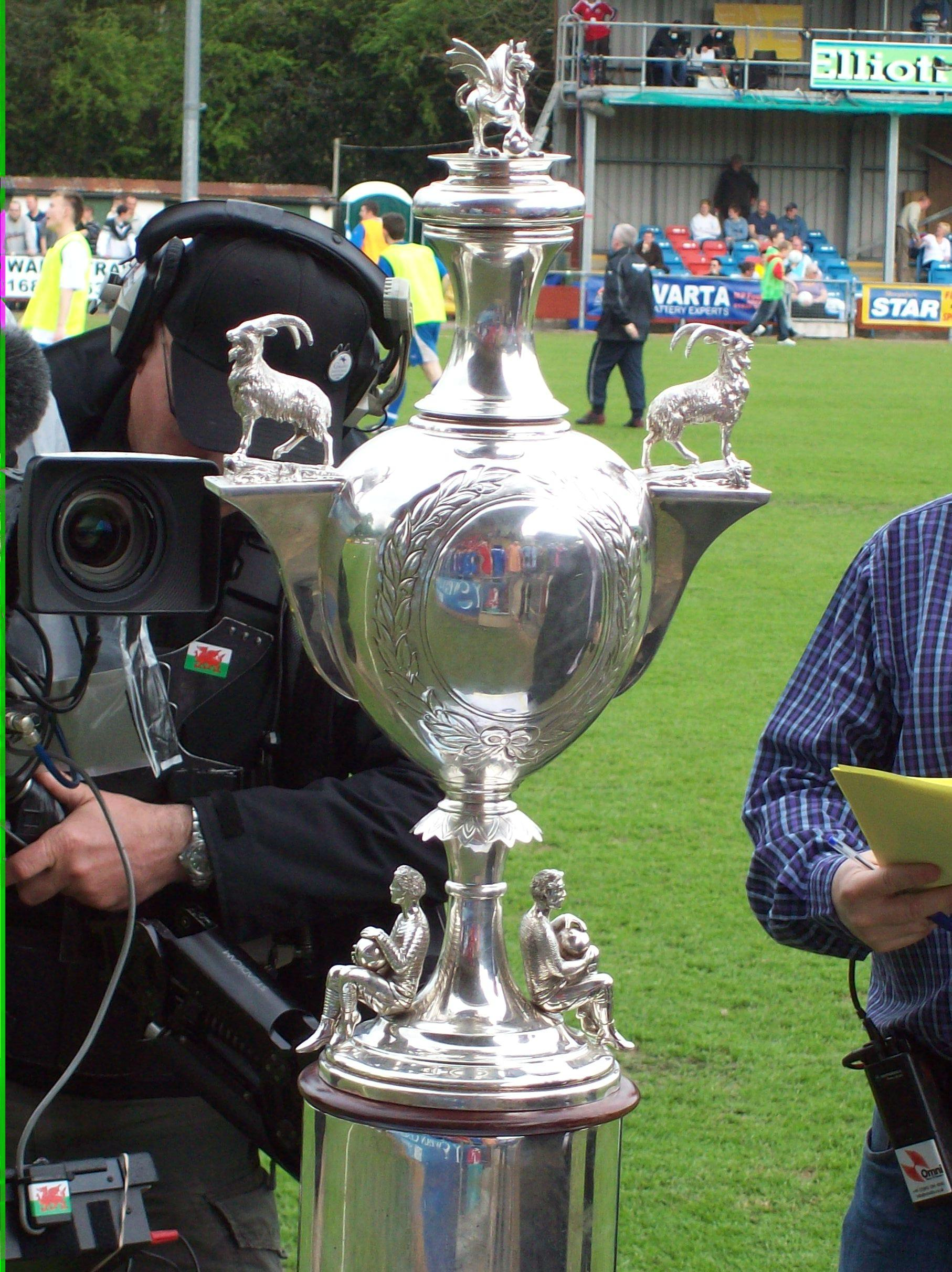
- The Welsh Cup

Tournament details
- Country: Wales

Final positions
- Champions: The New Saints
- Runners-up: Newtown

The 2014–15 FAW Welsh Cup was the 128th season of the annual knockout tournament for competitive football teams in Wales. The 2014–15 tournament commenced on 23 August 2014, and ended on 2 May 2015. The New Saints were the defending champions and successfully defended its title by defeating Newtown in the final. This meant The New Saints qualified to the first qualifying round of the 2015–16 UEFA Europa League.

== Qualifying round one ==
The matches were scheduled to be played on the weekend of 30/31 August 2014.

Mid
Tie no	Home team	Score	Away team	Tie no	Home team	Score	Away team
1	Builth Wells (4)	0–1	Kerry (4)	4	Montgomery Town (3)	1–2	Llanuwchllyn (4)
2	Four Crosses (3)	2–4	Welshpool Town (3)	5	Presteigne St. Andrews (4)	4–3	Newbridge on Wye (4)
3	Hay St. Marys FC (4)	7–2	Borth United (4)	6	Knighton Town (4)	2–1	Machynlleth (3)

North
Tie no	Home team	Score	Away team	Tie no	Home team	Score	Away team
7	Amlwch Town (4)	1–2	Treaddur Bay United (4)	16	Llangefni Town (4)	3–2	Llanystumdwy (5)
8	Brickfield Rangers (3)	2–1	Brymbo (3)	17	Mynydd Llandegai (4)	1–2	Pwllheli (3)
9	Caerwys (4)	2–4	Llangollen Town (3)	18	Nefyn United (5)	1–4	Dyffryn Nantlle Vale (4)
10	Castell Alun Colts (4)	1–3	Greenfield (4)	19	Penmaenmawr Phoenix (4)	2–1	Pentraeth (4)
11	Flint Mountain FC (5)	2–6	Brynford United (4)	20	Penrhyndeudraeth (3)	6–4	Llanfairpwllgwyngyll (3)
12	Gaerwen (4)	6–2	Llanllyfni (5)	21	Queens Park (4)	3–4	FC Nomads of Connahs Quay (3)
13	Halkyn United (4)	2–6	Coedpoeth United (3)	22	St. Asaph City (4)	8–1	New Brighton Villa (4)
14	Lex Glyndwr (4)	0–2	Llandyrnog United (3)	23	Talysarn Celts FC (5)	1–4	Kinmel Bay Sports (3)
15	Llandudno Junction (3)	3–4 (a.e.t.)	Llanerch ym Medd (4)	24	Venture Community (3)	w/o	Meliden (4)

South
Tie no	Home team	Score	Away team	Tie no	Home team	Score	Away team
25	Newport Civil Service (4)	3–4	Dynamo Aber FC (6)	41	Merthyr Saints (5)	0–1	Cwmaman Institute (5)
26	Aber Valley YMCA (5)	3–5	Tiger Bay (7)	42	Newcastle Emlyn (5)	1–2	Llanelli Town AFC (4)
27	AFC Butetown (5)	4–2	Carnetown (7)	43	Penrhiwceiber Constitutional (6)	5–6	Canton Liberal FC (6)
28	Albion Rovers FC (5)	4–2	Cwmbran Town (5)	44	Penrhiwfer FC (6)	1–1 (a.e.t.) 1-3(p)	Dinas Powys (3)
29	Ammanford (4)	3–2	Trostre (5)	45	Pontyclun (5)	1–1 (a.e.t.) 4-3(p)	Sporting Marvels FC (5)
30	Bettws (4)	3–0	Ynysgerwn (5)	46	Porthcawl Town Athletic (5)	1–2	Cwmamman United (4)
31	Bridgend Street (4)	5–4 (a.e.t.)	Llantwit Fardre (5)	47	Rhoose (4)	7–2	Cardiff Hibernian (6)
32	Caerau (4)	3–3 (a.e.t.) 4-1(p)	Treforest (5)	48	RTB Ebbw Vale (6)	3–4	Marshfield (5)
33	Cwm Rhonnda (7)	10–0	Trelewis Welfare (5)	49	Splott Albion (6)	0–8	Barry Town United (3)
34	Cwm Welfare FC (4)	6–0	Cardiff Grange Harlequins (4)	50	STM Sports (5)	3–2	Pontypridd Town (4)
35	FC Tredegar (6)	0–2	Newport YMCA (4)	51	Sully Sports (5)	10–1	Llanharry (6)
36	Garw (6)	3–3 (a.e.t.) 7-8(p)	Cornelly United (5)	52	Tredegar Town (4)	2–0	Cefn Fforest (6)
37	Kenfig Hill (6)	0–3	Trefelin (5)	53	Treharris Athletic Western (4)	2–1 (a.e.t.)	Aberfan (6)
38	Llantwit Major FC (4)	1–2	Cardiff Corinthians (4)	54	Treowen Stars (4)	5–1	Trethomas Bluebirds (5)
39	Lliswerry FC (4)	1–2	Risca United (3)	55	Ynysddu Welfare (6)	0–1	Blaenavon Blues (5)
40	Malpas United FC (6)	3–2	Llanwern (3)	56	Ystradgynlais (5)	2–0	Dafen Welfare (5)

== Qualifying round two ==
The matches were scheduled to be played on the weekend of 13/14 September 2014.

Mid
Tie no	Home team	Score	Away team	Tie no	Home team	Score	Away team
1	Berriew (3)	0–1 (a.e.t.)	Penrhyncoch (3)	5	Kerry (4)	3–2	Aberaeron (3)
2	Bow Street (3)	1–2	Waterloo Rovers	6	Llanfair United (3)	3–1	Knighton Town (4)
3	Carno (3)	2–1 (a.e.t.)	LLantsantffraid Village (3)	7	Llanrhaeadr Ym Mochant (3)	3–0	Presteigne St. Andrews (4)
4	Hay St. Marys FC (4)	5–0	Barmouth & Dyffryn United (3)	8	Tywyn Bryncrug (2)	2–3	Welshpool Town (3)

North
Tie no	Home team	Score	Away team	Tie no	Home team	Score	Away team
9	Llanberis (3)	5–3	Llanerch ym Medd (4)	18	Llangollen Town (3)	3–0	Llanrwst United (3)
10	A.F.C. Brynford (4)	4–0	Greenfield (3)	19	Llanrug United (3)	1–3	Coedpoeth United (3)
11	Corwen (3)	1–1 (a.e.t.) 1-3(p)	Gaerwen (4)	20	Llay Miners Welfare (3)	3–0	Penmaenmawr Phoenix (4)
12	Dyffryn Nantlle Vale (4)	1–0	Treaddur Bay United (4)	21	Meliden (4)	w/o	Bodedern Athletic (3)
13	Glan Conwy (3)	1–0	Hawarden Rangers (3)	22	Pwllheli (3)	1–4	St. Asaph City (4)
14	Glantraeth (3)	2–4	FC Nomads of Connahs Quay (3)	23	Rhos Aelwyd (3)	1–3	Llanuwchllyn (4)
15	Gwalchmai (3)	2–3	Brickfield Rangers (3)	24	Ruthin Town (3)	3–2	Chirk A.A.A. (3)
16	Kinmel Bay Sports (3)	2–4	Gresford Athletic (3)	25	Saltney Town (3)	1–2	Penrhyndeudraeth (3)
17	Llangefni Town (4)	3–1 (a.e.t.)	Llandrynog United (3)				

South
Tie no	Home team	Score	Away team	Tie no	Home team	Score	Away team
26	Trefelin (5)	3–2	AFC Rhoose (4)	37	Dynamo Aber FC (6)	3–1	Newport YMCA (4)
27	AFC Butetown (5)	1–0	Tredegar Town (4)	38	Ely Rangers (3)	3–5	Aberbargoed Buds (3)
28	Albion Rovers FC (5)	3–2	Pontyclun (5)	39	Llanelli Town (4)	2–0	Caldicot Town (3)
29	Barry Town United (3)	5–2	Ystradgynlais (5)	40	Marshfield (5)	3–0	Croesyceiliog (3)
30	Bettws (4)	0–1	Cardiff Corinthians (4)	41	Penrhiwceiber Rangers (3)	2–3	Sully Sports (5)
31	Blaenavon Blues (5)	0–2	Cwmbran Celtic (4)	42	Risca United (3)	5–1	Treowen Stars (4)
32	Caerleon (3)	0–4	Dinas Powys (3)	43	Tata Steel (3)	3–0	Caerau (4)
33	Canton Liberal FC (6)	3–1	Cwmaman Institute (5)	44	Tiger Bay (7)	5–2	Cwm Rhondda (7)
34	Chepstow Town (3)	3–0	Bridgend Street (4)	45	Treharris Athletic Western (4)	1–4	STM Sports (5)
35	Cwm Welfare FC (4)	1–2	Cornelly United (5)	46	Undy Athletic (3)	8–1	Malpas United (6)
36	Cwmamman United (4)	1–2 (a.e.t.)	Ammanford (4)	47	West End (3)	3–5 (a.e.t.)	AFC Llwydcoed (3)

== Round one ==
The matches were scheduled to be played on the weekend of 4/5 October 2014.

North
Tie no	Home team	Score	Away team	Tie no	Home team	Score	Away team
1	Caernarfon Town (2)	4–0	Porthmadog (2)	12	Llangefni Town (4)	3–6	St. Asaph City (4)
2	Caersws (2)	1–0	Llandudno (2)	13	Llanidloes Town (2)	4–0	Gaerwen (4)
3	Carno (3)	0–1	Rhayader Town (2)	14	Llanrhaead ym Mochant (3)	4–2	Glan Conwy (3)
4	Coedpoeth United (3)	0–3	Denbigh Town (2)	15	Llay Miners Welfare (3)	1–3	Gresford Athletic (3)
5	Dyffryn Nantlle Vale (3)	5–5 (a.e.t.) 2-4(p)	Llanberis (3)	16	Mold Alexandra (2)	4–0	Welshpool Town (3)
6	FC Nomads of Connahs Quay (3)	1–0 (a.e.t.)	AFC Brynford (4)	17	Penrhyncoch (3)	2–1	Flint Town United (2)
7	Guilsfield (2)	3–1	Penycae (2)	18	Penrhyndeudraeth (3)	2–3 (a.e.t.)	Llanfair United (3)
8	Holyhead Hotspur (2)	0–2	Conwy Borough (2)	19	Rhydymwyn (2)	0–3	Meliden (4)
9	Holywell Town (3)	4–2	Hay St. Marys FC (4)	20	Ruthin Town (3)	2–3	Buckley Town (2)
10	Kerry (4)	1–2	Brickfield Rangers (3)	21	Waterloo Rovers (3)	2–1	Llanuwchllyn (4)
11	Llandrindod Wells (2)	2–3 (a.e.t.)	Llangollen Town (3)				

South
Tie no	Home team	Score	Away team	Tie no	Home team	Score	Away team
22	Aberdare Town (2)	4–2	Barry Town United (3)	32	Dynamo Aber FC (6)	4–2	AFC Butetown (5)
23	Albion Rovers (5)	3–1	Cardiff Corinthians (4)	33	Garden Village (2)	9–0	AFC Porth (2)
24	Ammanford (4)	5–2	Sully Sports (5)	34	Goytre (Mon.) (2)	0–4	Goytre United (2)
25	Briton Ferry Llansawel (2)	4–1	Aberbargoed Buds (3)	35	Monmouth Town (2)	3–0	Ton Pentre (2)
26	Cambrian & Clydach BGC (2)	0–2	Undy Athletic (3)	36	STM Sports (5)	0–2	Haverfordwest County (2)
27	Canton Liberal FC (5)	1–2	Risca United (3)	37	Tata Steel	1–1 (a.e.t.) 1-3(p)	Marshfield (5)
28	Cardiff Metropolitan University (2)	9–0	AFC Llwydcoed (3)	38	Tiger Bay (7)	3–2	Trefelin BGC (5)
29	Cornelly United (5)	1–0	Pontardawe Town (2)	39	Afan Lido (2)	4–0	Chepstow Town (3)
30	Cwmbran Celtic (3)	2–1	Llanelli Town AFC (4)	40	Taffs Well (2)	0–3	Caerau Ely (2)
31	Dinas Powys (3)	0–1 (a.e.t.)	Pen-y-Bont (2)				

== Round two ==
Round Two matches were largely played on the weekend of 8/9 November 2014 - although some had to be postponed because of bad weather.

North
Tie no	Home team	Score	Away team	Tie no	Home team	Score	Away team
1	Brickfield Rangers (3)	1–2 (a.e.t.)	Llanrhaead ym Mochant (3)	6	Gresford Athletic (3)	2–1	Llanfair United (3)
2	Buckley Town (2)	6–0	Waterloo Rovers (3)	7	Llanberis (3)	0–3	Caersws (2)
3	Caernarfon Town (2)	1–0	Guilsfield (2)	8	Llanidloes Town (2)	0–2	Penrhyncoch (3)
4	Conwy Borough (2)	5–0	Denbigh Town (2)	9	Mold Alexandra(2)	0–1	Holywell Town (3)
5	FC Nomads of Connahs Quay (3)	5–2	Llangollen Town (3)	10	St. Asaph City (4)	1–0	Meliden (4)

South
Tie no	Home team	Score	Away team	Tie no	Home team	Score	Away team
11	Albion Rovers (5)	0–2	Undy Athletic (3)	16	Risca United (3)	1–2	Garden Village (2)
12	Briton Ferry Llansawel (2)	5–1	Aberdare Town (2)	17	Ammanford (4)	2–3	Cardiff Metropolitan University (2)
13	Cwmbran Celtic (3)	0–2	Caerau Ely (2)	18	Cornelly United (5)	1–5	Goytre United (2)
14	Dynamo Aber FC (6)	2–3	Tiger Bay (7)	19	Haverfordwest County (2)	2–1	Rhayader Town (2)
15	Monmouth Town (2)	3–1	Pen-y-Bont (2)	20	Afan Lido (2)	4–1	Marshfield (5)

Notes

1. Played at Undy Athletic / Tie reversed after original draw.

== Round three ==
The matches are scheduled to be played on the weekend of 29/30 November 2014.

Tie no	Home team	Score	Away team	Tie no	Home team	Score	Away team
1	Caernarfon Town (2)	2–3	The New Saints (1)	9	Cefn Druids (1)	1–5	Aberystwyth Town (1)
2	Undy Athletic (3)	2–4	Carmarthen Town (1)	10	Conwy Borough (2)	4–3	Briton Ferry Llansawel (2)
3	Afan Lido (2)	0–3	Llanrhaeadr ym Mochnant (3)	11	Gap Connah's Quay (1)	5–3	Monmouth Town (2)
4	Airbus UK Broughton (1)	5–0	Haverfordwest County (2)	12	Gresford Athletic (3)	5–0	St Asaph City (4)
5	Bala Town (1)	2–1	Port Talbot Town (1)	13	Newtown (1)	2–0	FC Nomads of Connah's Quay (3)
6	Bangor City (1)	1–0	Garden Village (2)	14	Penrhyncoch (3)	0–5	Caerau (Ely) (2)
7	Buckley Town (2)	0–1	Holywell Town (3)	15	Rhyl (1)	2–1	Goytre United (2)
8	Cardiff Metropolitan University (2)	4–1	Prestatyn Town (1)	16	Tiger Bay (7)	0–4	Caersws (2)

== Round Four ==
The matches are scheduled to be played on the weekend of 7/8 February 2015.

Tie no	Home team	Score	Away team	Tie no	Home team	Score	Away team
1	Caersws (2)	2–3	Newtown (1)	5	Cardiff Metropolitan University (2)	1–4	Airbus UK Broughton (1)
2	The New Saints (1)	3–0	Gresford Athletic (3)	6	Gap Connah's Quay (1)	2–2 (a.e.t.) 4-2(p)	Bala Town (1)
3	Bangor City (1)	3–0	Conwy Borough (2)	7	Holywell Town (3)	0–0 (a.e.t.) 2-3(p)	Aberystwyth Town (1)
4	Caerau (Ely) (2)	0–4 (a.e.t.)	Carmarthen Town (1)	8	Llanrhaeadr ym Mochnant (3)	2–4	Rhyl (1)

== Quarter-finals ==
The matches are scheduled to be played on the weekend of 7/8 March 2015.

Tie no	Home team	Score	Away team	Tie no	Home team	Score	Away team
1	Carmarthen Town (1)	2–3	Rhyl (1)	3	Bangor City (1)	1–2	Newtown (1)
2	Aberystwyth Town (1)	1–1 (a.e.t.) 2-4(p)	Airbus UK Broughton (1)	4	Gap Connah's Quay (1)	0–1	The New Saints (1)

== Semi-finals ==
The matches are scheduled to be played on the weekend of 4/5 April 2015. The first semi-final was played at Newtown's Latham Park ground while the second was held at the ground of Cefn Druids.

Tie no	Home team	Score	Away team
1	Airbus UK Broughton (1)	2–4	The New Saints (1)
2	Newtown (1)	2–1	Rhyl (1)

== Final ==
The final was played on the day of Saturday 2 May 2015 at Latham Park, Newtown, Powys.

Team 1	Score	Team 2
The New Saints (1)	2–0	Newtown (1)
