= 1995–96 Welsh Cup =

Tournament details
- Country: Wales

Final positions
- Champions: Llansantffraid
- Runners-up: Barry Town

The 1995–96 Welsh Cup was the 109th season of the main domestic football cup competition in Wales, the Welsh Cup. It was the first season where teams playing in the English football league system were excluded from the competition. The defending champions Wrexham were thus unable to enter, and Llansantffraid ended as the cup winners, beating Barry Town in the final.

== Preliminary round ==
| Home team | Score | Away team | Notes |
|---|---|---|---|
| Abercynon Athletic | 1–2 | Cambrian United | |
| Bala Town | 0–2 | Penley | |
| British Steel | 3–1 | Bryntirion Athletic | |
| Grange Harlequins | 3–2 | Pontlottyn Blast Furnace | |
| Panteg | 0–2 | Newport YMCA | |
| Porthcawl Town | 2–2 | Llangeinor | |
| Llangeinor | 2–3 | Porthcawl Town | replay |
| Porth Tywyn Suburbs | 6–0 | Pontyclun | |
| Trelewis Welfare | 0–5 | Albion Rovers | |

== First round ==
Matches were played on Saturday 16 September 1995.

| Home team | Score | Away team | Notes |
|---|---|---|---|
| Aberaman Athletic | 3–1 | Risca United | |
| Abergavenny Thursdays | 1–0 | Caerleon | |
| Albion Rovers | 0–2 | Treowen Stars | |
| Ammanford | 2–0 | Bridgend Town | |
| Brecon Corinthians | 0–1 | Cardiff Corinthians | |
| British Steel | 0–1 | BP Llandarcy | |
| Buckley Town | 1–1 | New Brighton Villa | |
| New Brighton Villa | 0–3 | Buckley Town | replay |
| Cambrian United | 0–4 | Newport YMCA | |
| Carmarthen Town | 2–4 | Pontardawe Athletic | |
| Carno | 1–2 | Rhayader Town | |
| Cefn Druids | 0–2 | Oswestry Town | |
| Ferndale Athletic | 1–12 | Taffs Well | |
| Fields Park Pontllanfraith | 2–2 | AFC Porth | |
| AFC Porth | 2–1 | Fields Park Pontllanfraith | replay |
| Goytre United | 3–0 | Haverfordwest County | |
| Grange Harlequins | 5–1 | Caldicot Town | |
| Gresford Athletic | 1–2 | Chirk AAA | |
| Knighton Town | 1–3 | Llandrindod Wells | |
| Llandudno | 1–0 | Llangefni Town | |
| Llandyrnog United | 2–0 | Prestatyn Town | |
| Llanrwst United | 3–2 | Rhyl Delta | |
| Llanwern | 0–4 | Pontypridd Town | |
| Maesteg Park | 2–1 | Caerau | |
| Mostyn | 3–2 | Denbigh Town | |
| Nantlle Vale | 2–1 | Nefyn United | |
| New Broughton | 1–3 | Ruthin Town | |
| Newcastle Emlyn | 1–5 | Morriston Town | |
| Penley | 2–2 | Mold Alexandra | |
| Mold Alexandra | 5–2 | Penley | replay |
| Penparcau | 1–1 | Llanidloes Town | |
| Llanidloes Town | 2–3 | Penparcau | replay |
| Penrhiwceiber Rangers | 2–1 | Cardiff Civil Service | |
| Pen-y-cae | 1–6 | Brymbo | |
| Porthcawl Town | 0–3 | Porth Tywyn Suburbs | |
| Port Talbot Athletic | 2–0 | Skewen Athletic | |
| Rhos Aelwyd | 0–2 | Lex XI | |
| Welshpool | 2–1 | Penrhyncoch | |

== Second round ==
Matches were played on Saturday 14 October 1995.

| Home team | Score | Away team | Notes |
|---|---|---|---|
| Aberaman Athletic | 1–1 | Llandrindod Wells | |
| Llandrindod Wells | 4–1 | Aberaman Athletic | replay |
| AFC Porth | 3–3 | Grange Harlequins | |
| Grange Harlequins | 3–2 | AFC Porth | replay |
| Ammanford | 1–4 | Cardiff Corinthians | |
| Briton Ferry Athletic | 3–0 | Pontardawe Athletic | |
| Brymbo | 1–3 | Conwy United | |
| Connah's Quay Nomads | 5–1 | Welshpool | |
| Ebbw Vale | 3–1 | BP Llandarcy | |
| Goytre United | 4–2 | Penrhiwceiber Rangers | |
| Llandudno | 3–2 | Mostyn | |
| Llandyrnog United | 2–1 | Buckley Town | |
| Llanrwst United | 2–6 | Cemaes Bay | |
| Maesteg Park | 2–1 | Morriston Town | |
| Nantlle Vale | 1–3 | Caersws | |
| Newport YMCA | 2–4 | Pontypridd Town | |
| Oswestry Town | 1–0 | Chirk AAA | |
| Penparcau | 0–2 | Rhyl | |
| Porthmadog | 2–1 | Mold Alexandra | |
| Porth Tywyn Suburbs | 0–0 | Taffs Well | |
| Taffs Well | 1–0 | Porth Tywyn Suburbs | replay |
| Port Talbot Athletic | 2–7 | Aberystwyth Town | |
| Rhayader Town | 1–2 | Abergavenny Thursdays | |
| Ruthin Town | 0–3 | Lex XI | |
| Treowen Stars | 1–3 | Llanelli | |

== Third round ==
Matches were played on Saturday 4 November 1995.

| Home team | Score | Away team | Notes |
|---|---|---|---|
| Abergavenny Thursdays | 3–2 | Caersws | |
| Aberystwyth Town | 1–1 | Newtown | |
| Newtown | 0–1 | Aberystwyth Town | replay, after extra time |
| Bangor City | 2–3 | Cwmbrân Town | |
| Cemaes Bay | 3–0 | Maesteg Park | |
| Connah's Quay Nomads | 1–3 | Llandudno | |
| Conwy United | 0–2 | Barry Town | |
| Ebbw Vale | 1–0 | Briton Ferry Athletic | |
| Goytre United | 8–2 | Llanelli | |
| Holywell Town | 0–2 | Grange Harlequins | |
| Lex XI | 0–0 | Ton Pentre | |
| Ton Pentre | 2–3 | Lex XI | replay, after extra time |
| Llandrindod Wells | 1–0 | Afan Lido | |
| Llansantffraid | 2–1 | Llandyrnog United | |
| Oswestry Town | 2–1 | Flint Town United | |
| Porthmadog | 1–0 | Cardiff Corinthians | |
| Rhyl | 1–0 | Inter Cardiff | Rhyl disqualified, fielded ineligible player. Inter Cardiff advanced to the next round |
| Taffs Well | 0–1 | Pontypridd Town | |

== Fourth round ==
Matches were played on Saturday 16 December 1995, unless otherwise stated.

| Home team | Score | Away team | Notes |
|---|---|---|---|
| Aberystwyth Town | 0–0 | Oswestry Town | |
| Oswestry Town | 3–2 | Aberystwyth Town | replay, played on Wednesday 10 January 1996 |
| Cwmbrân Town | 3–0 | Goytre United | |
| Grange Harlequins | 1–2 | Ebbw Vale | played on Wednesday 13 December 1995 |
| Inter Cardiff | 2–0 | Llandudno | |
| Llansantffraid | 4–0 | Abergavenny Thursdays | |
| Pontypridd Town | 1–0 | Cemaes Bay | |
| Porthmadog | 2–1 | Llandrindod Wells | |
| Ton Pentre | 0–1 | Barry Town | |

== Fifth round (quarter-finals) ==
Matches were played on Saturday 17 February 1996, unless otherwise stated.

| Home team | Score | Away team | Notes |
|---|---|---|---|
| Ebbw Vale | 0–1 | Inter Cardiff | played on Sunday 11 February 1996 |
| Cwmbrân Town | 2–0 | Porthmadog | |
| Oswestry Town | 0–2 | Barry Town | |
| Pontypridd Town | 1–2 | Llansantffraid | |

== Semi-finals ==
=== First leg ===
Matches were played on Saturday 16 March 1996.

| Home team | Score | Away team | Notes |
|---|---|---|---|
| Barry Town | 1–0 | Cwmbrân Town | |
| Inter Cardiff | 0–1 | Llansantffraid | |

=== Second leg ===
Matches were played on Saturday 13 April 1996.

| Home team | Score | Away team | Notes |
|---|---|---|---|
| Cwmbrân Town | 3–2 | Barry Town | 3–3 on aggregate, Barry Town advanced on away goals |
| Llansantffraid | 3–1 | Inter Cardiff | Llansantffraid won 4–1 on aggregate |

== Final ==
The final was played on Saturday 19 May 1996, between Llansantffraid and Barry Town. It finished 2–2 during regular time and 3–3 after extra time. In the penalty shoot-out, Llansantffraid won 3–2 to win the Welsh Cup for the first time in their history. Llansantffraid at the time were a comparatively small club, from a village with a population under 1,000, while Barry Town were full-time professionals.

19 May 1996

| Llansantffraid | 3–3 (3–2 p) | Barry Town |
|---|---|---|
| Tommy Morgan 29'; Gary Evans 54'; Chris Whelan 95' | | Gary Lloyd 35' own goal 61'; Tony Bird 118' |

National Stadium, Cardiff
Attendance: 2,666
Referee: R. B. Gifford (Llanbradach)
