= Newport F.C. =

Newport Football Club could refer to:

== Association football (soccer) ==
Current teams:

- Newport City F.C. (Newport, Wales)
- Newport Corinthians F.C. (Newport, Wales)
- Newport County A.F.C. (Newport, Wales)
- Newport (IOW) F.C. (Newport, Isle of Wight)
- Newport Pagnell Town F.C. (Newport Pagnell, Buckinghamshire)
- Newport Saints F.C. (Newport, Wales)

Historic teams:

- Newport Civil Service F.C. (Newport, Wales), former name of Sifil A.F.C.
- Newport F.C. (Newport, Shropshire); also called Newport Town
- Newport YMCA A.F.C. (Newport, Wales)

== Rugby union ==
- Newport RFC (Newport, Wales)
