= Welsh Football League Division Three =

Association football league in Wales

Welsh League Division Three
- Founded: 1964
- Folded: 2019
- Country: Wales
- Number of clubs: 16
- Level on pyramid: 3 (1964–1983 as Division Two); 3 (1983–1990 as Division One); 3 (1990–1992 as Division Two); 4 (1992–2019 as Division Three)
- Domestic cup(s): Welsh Cup; Welsh Football League Cup
- Last champions: Penydarren BGC (2018–19)

The Welsh Football League Division Three, (last known as the Nathanielcars.co.uk Welsh League Division Three, for sponsorship reasons) was a football league.

== History ==
Until the 1964–65 season the Welsh Football League operated three divisions, Division One, and two regional Division Two leagues, East and West within the Welsh football league system in South Wales. From the 1964–65 season this changed with Division One becoming the Premier Division and Division Two renamed as Division One. Following these changes, a Tier 3, Division Two was created. operated under the Division Two title.

From 1983-84 season, the Premier Division changed its name to the National Division and the First Division adopted the Premier Division With these changes the third tier Division Two was renamed 'Division One'

With the creation of the League of Wales for the 1992–93 season, the Welsh Football League moved to levels two, three and four of the Welsh football pyramid, and adopted the titles of Division One, Division Two and Division Three respectively.

After the creation of the Cymru South, for the 2019–20 season, the league was rebranded as the Welsh Football League Division Two and Division Three was defunct.

== Promotion and relegation ==
If the team which finished top of the Division had good enough ground facilities, it was promoted to the Welsh Football League Division Two and was replaced by the team finishing bottom of Division Two. The team finishing in bottom position of the division was relegated to one of the local leagues.

== Champions ==
as Division Two (Tier 3 of the Welsh Football League)

- 1964-65: Chepstow Town
- 1965-66: Caerleon
- 1966-67: Swansea University
- 1967-68: Cwmbrân Town
- 1968-69: Ynysybwl Athletic
- 1969-70: Croesyceiliog
- 1970-71: Cardiff University
- 1971-72: Sully
- 1972-73: Pontllanfraith
- 1973-74: Caerau Athletic
- 1974-75: Blaenavon Blues
- 1975-76: Abergavenny Thursdays
- 1976-77: Milford United
- 1977-78: Aberaman Athletic
- 1978-79: Newport YMCA
- 1979-80: Lake United
- 1980-81: Trelewis
- 1981-82: Ferndale Athletic
- 1982-83: Tondu Robins

as Division One (Tier 3 of the Welsh Football League)

- 1983-84: Pontlottyn Blast Furnace
- 1984-85: Taff's Well
- 1985-86: South Wales Police
- 1986-87: BP (Llandarcy)
- 1987-88: Merthyr Tydfil
- 1988-89: Garw Athletic
- 1989-90: Caldicot Town

as Division Two (Tier 3 of the Welsh Football League)

- 1990-91: Cardiff Civil Service
- 1991-92: AFC Porth

as Division Three (Tier 4 of the Welsh Football Pyramid)

- 1992-93: Treowen Stars
- 1993–94: Penrhiwceiber Rangers
- 1994–95: Pontardawe Town
- 1995–96: Cardiff Institute
- 1996–97: Gwynfi United
- 1997–98: Milford United
- 1998–99: Caerleon
- 1999–2000 Garw Athletic
- 2000–01: Bettws
- 2001–02: Newport YMCA
- 2002–03: Pontyclun
- 2003–04: Bryntirion Athletic
- 2004–05: Troedyrhiw
- 2005–06: West End
- 2006–07: Cwmbran Celtic
- 2007–08: Pentwyn Dynamo
- 2008–09: AFC Llwydcoed
- 2009–10: Aberbargoed Buds
- 2010–11: Monmouth Town
- 2011–12: Undy Athletic
- 2012–13: Cardiff Metropolitan University
- 2013–14: Barry Town United
- 2014–15: Llanelli Town
- 2015–16: Pontypridd Town
- 2016–17: Llantwit Major
- 2017–18: Swansea University
- 2018–19: Penydarren BGC

== See also ==
- Football in Wales
- Welsh football league system
- Welsh Cup
- Welsh League Cup
- FAW Premier Cup
- List of football clubs in Wales
- List of stadiums in Wales by capacity
