= Gwent County FA Senior Cup =

Regional knock-out competition for clubs

- Founded: 1919
- Region: Wales
- Current champions: Newport Corinthians
- Most championships: Newport County/ Newport AFC (28 titles)
- 2025–26

The Gwent County Football Association Senior Cup is the regional knock-out competition for clubs beneath the umbrella of the Gwent County Football Association in South Wales.

== Previous winners ==
Information sourced from the Gwent County Football Association website.

=== 1910s ===
- 1919–20: – Abertillery Town

=== 1920s ===
- 1920–21: – Newport County
- 1921–22: – Newport County
- 1922–23: – Newport County
- 1923–24: – Newport County
- 1924–25: – Ebbw Vale
- 1925–26: – Newport County
- 1926–27: – Ebbw Vale
- 1927–28: – Newport County
- 1928–29: – Ebbw Vale
- 1929–30: – Lovell's Athletic

=== 1930s ===
- 1930–31: – Lovell's Athletic
- 1931–32: – Newport County
- 1932–33: – Ebbw Vale
- 1933–34: – Pontnewydd
- 1934–35: – Oakdale
- 1935–36: – Newport County
- 1936–37: – Lovell's Athletic
- 1937–38: – Lovell's Athletic
- 1938–39: – Lovell's Athletic
- 1939–40: – Monmouth Town

=== 1940s ===
- 1940–41: – No competition – World War Two
- 1941–42: – No competition – World War Two
- 1942–43: – No competition – World War Two
- 1943–44: – No competition – World War Two
- 1944–45: – Cwm Welfare
- 1945–46: – Ebbw Vale
- 1946–47: – Lovell's Athletic
- 1947–48: – Albion Rovers
- 1948–49: – Lovell's Athletic
- 1949–50: – Lovell's Athletic

=== 1950s ===
- 1950–51: – Ebbw Vale
- 1951–52: – Lovell's Athletic
- 1952–53: – Abergavenny Thursdays
- 1953–54: – Newport County
- 1954–55: – Lovell's Athletic
- 1955–56: – Abergavenny Thursdays
- 1956–57: – Abergavenny Thursdays
- 1957–58: – Newport County
- 1958–59: – Newport County
- 1959–60: – Pontllanfraith

=== 1960s ===
- 1960–61: – Abergavenny Thursdays
- 1961–62: – Pontllanfraith
- 1962–63: –
- 1963–64: – Abergavenny Thursdays
- 1964–65: – Newport County
- 1965–66: – South Wales Switchgear
- 1966–67: – South Wales Switchgear
- 1967–68: – Newport County
- 1968–69: – Newport County
- 1969–70: – Newport County

=== 1970s ===
- 1970–71: – Cwmbran R.C.
- 1971–72: – Newport County
- 1972–73: – Newport County
- 1973–74: – Newport County
- 1974–75: – Newport YMCA
- 1975–76: – Newport YMCA
- 1976–77: – Pontnewydd Seniors
- 1977–78: – Newport YMCA
- 1978–79: – Aberbargoed Buds
- 1979–80: – Caldicot Town

=== 1980s ===
- 1980–81: – Albion Rovers
- 1981–82: – Girlings (Cwmbran)
- 1982–83: – Llanfrechfa Grange
- 1983–84: – Fields Park Athletic
- 1984–85: – Risca United
- 1985–86: – Croesyceiliog
- 1986–87: – Croesyceiliog
- 1987–88: – Aberbargoed Buds
- 1988–89: – Albion Rovers
- 1989–90: – Pill A.F.C.

=== 1990s ===
- 1990–91: – Pill A.F.C.
- 1991–92: – Abergavenny Thursdays
- 1992–93: – Caldicot Town
- 1993–94: – Caerleon
- 1994–95: – Cwmbran Town
- 1995–96: – Cwmbran Town
- 1996–97: – Newport AFC
- 1997–98: – Newport AFC
- 1998–99: – Newport AFC
- 1999–2000: – Newport County

=== 2000s ===
- 2000–01: – Newport County
- 2001–02: – Newport County
- 2002–03: – Croesyceiliog
- 2003–04: – Newport County
- 2004–05: – Newport County
- 2005–06: – Cwmbran Town
- 2006–07: – Croesyceiliog
- 2007–08: – Caldicot Town
- 2008–09: – Newport Civil Service
- 2009–10: – Competition suspended

=== 2010s ===
- 2010–11: – Newport County
- 2011–12: – Newport County
- 2012–13: – Caldicot Town
- 2013–14: – Goytre
- 2014–15: – Monmouth Town
- 2015–16: – Cwmffrwdoer Sports
- 2016–17: – Malpas United
- 2017–18: – Abertillery Bluebirds
- 2018–19: – Cwmbran Town
- 2019–20: – Competition not completed (Covid-19 pandemic)

=== 2020s ===
- 2020–21: – No Competition (Covid-19 pandemic)
- 2021–22: – Blaenavon Blues
- 2022–23: – Aberbargoed Buds
- 2023–24: – Newport Corinthians
- 2024–25: – Cwmbran Town
- 2025–26: – Newport Corinthians

=== Number of competition wins ===
- Newport County/ Newport AFC – 25
- Lovell's Athletic – 10
- Abergavenny Thursdays – 6
- Ebbw Vale – 6
- Caldicot Town – 4
- Croesyceiliog – 4
- Cwmbran Town – 4
- Pontllanfraith/ South Wales Switchgear – 4
- Aberbargoed Buds – 3
- Albion Rovers – 3
- Newport YMCA – 3
- Monmouth Town – 2
- Newport Corinthians – 2
- Pill – 2
- Pontnewydd – 2
- Abertillery Bluebirds – 1
- Abertillery Town – 1
- Blaenavon Blues – 1
- Caerleon – 1
- Cwmbran R.C. – 1
- Cwmffrwdoer Sports – 1
- Cwm Welfare – 1
- Fields Park Athletic – 1
- Girlings (Cwmbran) – 1
- Goytre – 1
- Llanfrechfa Grange – 1
- Malpas United – 1
- Newport Civil Service – 1
- Oakdale – 1
- Risca United – 1
