= Gwent County FA Amateur Cup =

Regional knock-out competition for clubs

- Founded: 1925
- Region: Wales
- Current champions: Aberbargoed Buds
- Most championships: Albion Rovers (Newport) (7 wins)
- 2025–26

The Gwent County Football Association Amateur Cup is the regional knock-out competition for clubs beneath the umbrella of the Gwent County Football Association in South Wales. Known as the Gwent Amateur Cup, it has also in its history been called the Monmouthshire Amateur Cup.

== Previous winners ==
Information sourced from the Gwent County Football Association website unless otherwise indicated.

=== 1920s ===
- 1925–26: – Lovell's Athletic
- 1926–27: – New Tredegar
- 1927–28: – Excelsiors
- 1928–29: – Lovell's Athletic
- 1929–30: – 1st Brigade R.H.A.

=== 1930s ===
- 1930–31: – Cwm Betterment
- 1931–32: – Lliswerry
- 1932–33: – Cwm Betterment
- 1933–34: – Brookside Athletic
- 1934–35: – Cwm Welfare
- 1935–36: – Ynysddu Crusaders
- 1936–37: – Ebbw Junction
- 1937–38: – Clydach United
- 1938–39: – Cefn Forest
- 1939–40: – No competition – World War Two

=== 1940s ===
- 1940–41: – No competition – World War Two
- 1941–42: – No competition – World War Two
- 1942–43: – No competition – World War Two
- 1943–44: – No competition – World War Two
- 1944–45: – Cwm Welfare
- 1945–46: – Lysaght’s
- 1946–47: – Albion Rovers
- 1947–48: – Ynysddu Welfare
- 1948–49: – Newbridge Welfare
- 1949–50: – St. Julian's

=== 1950s ===
- 1950–51: – St. Julian's
- 1951–52: – St. Julian's
- 1952–53: – Fleur-de-Lys Welfare
- 1953–54: – Fleur-de-Lys Welfare
- 1954–55: – Caerleon
- 1955–56: – St. Julian's
- 1956–57: – St. Julian's
- 1957–58: – Monmouth Town
- 1958–59: – Monmouth Town
- 1959–60: – Albion Rovers (Newport)

=== 1960s ===
- 1960–61: – Docks United
- 1961–62: – Abergavenny Thursdays
- 1962–63: – Girlings
- 1963–64: – Caerleon
- 1964–65: – Bedwas Colliery
- 1965–66: – Caerleon
- 1966–67: – Corinthians
- 1967–68: – Christchurch
- 1968–69: – Pontnewydd
- 1969–70: – Fields Park Athletic

=== 1970s ===
- 1970–71: – Christchurch
- 1971–72: – Pontllanfraith
- 1972–73: – Cwmbran Celtic
- 1973–74: – Newport YMCA
- 1974–75: – Newport YMCA
- 1975–76: – Croesyceiliog
- 1976–77: – No winner listed
- 1977–78: – Aberbargoed Buds
- 1978–79: – Fields Park Athletic
- 1979–80: – Aberbargoed Buds

=== 1980s ===
- 1980–81: – Girlings (Cwmbran)
- 1981–82: – Newbridge Town
- 1982–83: – Tredegar Town
- 1983–84: – Monmouth Town
- 1984–85: – Caldicot Town
- 1985–86: – Risca United
- 1986–87: – Albion Rovers (Newport)
- 1987–88: – Albion Rovers (Newport)
- 1988–89: – Newport Corinthians
- 1989–90: – Albion Rovers (Newport)

=== 1990s ===
- 1990–91: – Albion Rovers (Newport)
- 1991–92: – Pill
- 1992–93: – Pill
- 1993–94: – Spencer Youth and Boys
- 1994–95: – Newport Civil Service
- 1995–96: – Monmouth Town
- 1996–97: – Spencer Youth and Boys
- 1997–98: – Cwmtillery
- 1998–99: – Newport Civil Service
- 1999–00: – Cwmtillery

=== 2000s ===
- 2000–01: – Abertillery Town
- 2001–02: – Llanhilleth Athletic
- 2002–03: – Christchurch/Hamdden
- 2003–04: – Croesyceiliog
- 2004–05: – Underwood
- 2005–06: – Abertillery Bluebirds
- 2006–07: – Abertillery Bluebirds
- 2007–08: – Govilon
- 2008–09: – Abertillery Bluebirds
- 2009–10: – Coed Eva Athletic

=== 2010s ===
- 2010–11: – Newport Corinthians
- 2011–12: – Lliswerry
- 2012–13: – Lliswerry
- 2013–14: – Pill
- 2014–15: – Albion Rovers (Newport)
- 2015–16: – Spencer Youth & Boys
- 2016–17: – Fairfield United
- 2017–18: – Ynysddu Welfare
- 2018–19: – Abertillery Excelsiors
- 2019–20: – Competition not completed (Covid-19 pandemic)

=== 2020s ===
- 2020–21: – No Competition (Covid-19 pandemic)
- 2021–22: – Cwmffrwdoer Sports
- 2022–23: – Cefn Fforest
- 2023–24: – AFC Pontymister
- 2024–25: – Nantyglo
- 2025–26: – Aberbargoed Buds
