= Cardiff University F.C. =

Association football club in Wales

Cardiff University Football Club
- Full name: Cardiff University Football Club
- League: BUCS Football League

Cardiff University Football Club are a Welsh football club based at Cardiff University, Cardiff, Wales. They complete in the British Universities and Colleges Sport BUCS Football League competitions.

== Period in the Welsh Football League ==
The team joined the Welsh Football League for the 1968–69 season in Division Two, finishing 5th in their first season in the league. The 1970–71 season saw them finish as league champions and promoted to Division One. The 1971–72 season saw the club finish as runner-up and gain promotion to Premier Division, then highest tier of football in South Wales. Dai Smith won promotion with Aberaman and Cardiff University in 3 consecutive seasons 1969 to 1972. They spent two seasons in the top division finishing 15th and 18th (bottom of the table). The club then spent two seasons in Division One and two seasons in Division Two, leaving the Welsh League at the end of the 1977–78 season.

== Honours ==
- Division One – Runners-up: 1971–72
- Division Two – Champions: 1970–71
