= Danny McCarthy (footballer) =

Welsh footballer (1942–2019)

Personal information
- Full name: Daniel John Anthony McCarthy
- Date of birth: 26 September 1942
- Place of birth: Abergavenny, Wales
- Date of death: July 2019 (aged 76)
- Position: Winger

Senior career*
Years	Team	Apps	(Gls)
- Abergavenny Thursdays
1960–1962	Cardiff City	7	(0)
- Merthyr Tydfil
- Abergavenny Thursdays
- * Club domestic league appearances and goals

Daniel John Anthony McCarthy (26 September 1942 – July 2019) was a Welsh professional footballer who played as a winger. He made seven appearances in the Football League for Cardiff City.
