= Cefn Fforest A.F.C. =

Football club based in Caerphilly County Borough

Cefn Fforest
- Full name: Cefn Fforest Association Football Club
- Nickname: The Village
- Founded: 1934
- Ground: Britannia Fields
- League: Gwent County League Premier Division
- 2025–26: Gwent County League Premier Division, 13th of 16
- Website: cefnfforestafc.com

Cefn Fforest A.F.C. is a Welsh football club based in Cefn Fforest, Caerphilly County Borough. The team currently plays in the Gwent County League Premier Division.

The club has competed in the Welsh Cup, getting to the first round in 2023–24, losing to Cardiff Airport.

In 2023, the club were promoted to the Gwent County League Premier Division.

== Honours ==
- Gwent County League Division One (level 2) - Champions: 2022–23
- Gwent County League Division Two (level 2) - Champions: 1989–90, 1997–98
- Gwent County League Division Two (level 3) - Champions: 2019–20
- Gwent County League Division Three (level 3) - Champions: 1988–89
- Monmouthshire/ Gwent Amateur Cup – Winners: 1938–39, 2022–23
