= Abertillery Excelsiors A.F.C. =

Association football club in Wales

Coordinates: 51°44′45″N 3°8′8.1″W

Abertillery Excelsiors
- Full name: Abertillery Excelsiors Football Club
- Founded: 2000 (as Tillery FC)
- Ground: The Jim Owen Field
- Capacity: 300
- Chairman: Darren Britton
- League: Gwent County League Premier Division
- 2023–24: Gwent County League Premier Division, 9th of 16

Abertillery Excelsiors A.F.C. are a Welsh football club from the town of Abertillery, Blaenau Gwent in South Wales. Formed in 2000 as Tillery FC, they have played in the Welsh Football League. The team play in the Gwent County League Premier Division, tier 4 of the Welsh football pyramid.

== History ==
At the end of the 1999–2000 season, two neighbouring clubs, Cwmtillery and Abertillery Town forged an alliance, and played under the club name Tillery FC until the close of the 2004–05 season. At the beginning of the 2005–06 season, the club was officially renamed Abertillery Excelsiors.

== Honours ==
- Gwent County League Premier Division – Champions: 2019–20
- Gwent County League Second Division – Runners-up: 2018–19
- Gwent County League Amateur Cup – Winners: 2018–19
- Gwent County FA Amateur Cup – Winners: 2017–18
- Gwent County League Premier League Cup – Runners–up: 2022–23

== Welsh Football League history ==
Information in this section is courtesy of Football Club History Database and the Welsh Soccer Archive.

Season	Pyramid Tier	League	Final position
2001–02	4	Welsh Football League Division Three	8th
2002–03	4	Welsh Football League Division Three	10th
2003–04	4	Welsh Football League Division Three	3rd (promoted)
2004–05	3	Welsh Football League Division Two	14th
2005–06	3	Welsh Football League Division Two	16th (relegated)
2006–07	4	Welsh Football League Division Three	14th
2007–08	4	Welsh Football League Division Three	17th (relegated)
