= Cardiff Civil Service F.C. =

Former Welsh football club

- Full name: Cardiff Civil Service Football Club
- Short name: CCS
- Ground: Civil Service Ground, Cardiff
Home colours	Away colours

Cardiff Civil Service Football Club was an association football club based in Cardiff, Wales. The team joined the Second Division of the Welsh Football League in 1990 and won promotion to the First Division in its first campaign. The side remained in the First Division for more than a decade before dropping out of the Welsh Football League.

The club played its home matches at the Civil Service Grounds on Sanatorium Road in Ely, Cardiff, Wales.

== History ==
Cardiff Civil Service joined the Second Division of the Welsh Football League for the 1990–91 season. The side finished the campaign as champions of the division, scoring 100 goals in the process and winning promotion to the First Division. The Civil Service initially adapted well to the higher tier, finishing in the top eight in four of its first five seasons in the higher tier. This included a fourth-placed finish in the 1995–96 campaign, the club's highest placed finish in the Welsh Football League. However, a gradual decline led the side to finish in the bottom half of the table for the majority of its time in the First Division. The side left the Welsh Football League in 2003. The club's reserve side spent two seasons in the South Wales Amateur League.

The club gained media attention following the progress of Welsh footballer Gareth Bale, who began his career in the club's youth sides. He was subsequently spotted by scouts as an eight-year old playing for the Civil Service's six-a-side team in Newport by scouts from Southampton.

== Honours ==
- Welsh Football League Division Two (Tier 3 of the Welsh Football League)
  - Champions (1): 1990–91
