= Newport Saints F.C. =

Association football club in Wales

Newport Saints
- Full name: Newport Saints Football Club
- Nickname: The Saints
- Founded: 2012
- Ground: Blackash Park
- League: Gwent County League Premier Division
- 2024–25: Gwent County League Premier Division, 6th of 16
Home colours	Away colours

Newport Saints are a Welsh football club from Newport, Wales. They play in the Gwent County League Premier Division.

== History ==
The club were originally known as West of St Julians FC, formed in 2012 as a merger of the St Julians Saturday team and the West of England Sunday team. They played in the Newport and District Football League, finishing the 2013–14 season as champions and were promoted to Division Three of the Gwent County League. In the 2018–19 season the club changed their name to Newport Saints FC and finished the season as league champions, gaining promotion to Division Two, which was then renamed as Division One.

The 2023–24 season saw the club finish the season as Division One champions, gaining promotion to the Premier Division, tier four of the Welsh Football Pyramid for the 2024–25 season.

== Honours ==
=== Newport Saints ===
- Gwent County League Division One – Champions: 2023–24
- Gwent County League Division Three – Champions: 2018–19

=== West of St Julians ===
- Newport and District Football League – Champions: 2013–14
