= Newport YMCA A.F.C. =

Former association football club in Wales

Newport YMCA
- Full name: Newport YMCA; Association Football Club
- Nickname(s): The YM or YMCA
- Founded: 1973
- Dissolved: 2018
- Ground: The YMCA Ground; Mendalgief Road, Newport
- Capacity: 250
- 2017–18: Gwent County League
Home colours	Away colours

Newport YMCA Association Football Club were a football team based in the city of Newport, South Wales.

They were founded in 1973 with the merging of the Newport Central YMCA and Newport Pill YMCA sides and were elected to the Welsh Football League in 1978. Newport YMCA had good Welsh Cup results in the 2000s as they reached the Fifth round of the competition on various occasions. This resulted in them facing off against three Welsh Premier League sides: Carmarthen Town, Welshpool Town & Bangor City.

== History ==
=== 1973: The formation of YM ===
Newport YMCA Football Club was formed in 1973 when the Newport Central YMCA and Newport Pill YMCA sides merged to form one club.

The merger took place as a result of a decision made by the Board of Management who were responsible for running the affairs of the YMCA in Newport at that time. They believed that it would be in the best interests of both clubs for them to merge and share facilities. After many months of negotiation the two sides, usually fierce rivals on the park, merged to form the one Club, Newport YMCA.

Prior to the merger both sides were successful teams in their own right. Pill YMCA playing in the higher standard Gwent Premier League and Central YMCA in the Newport & District League Premier X Division.

Pill YMCA who had moved onto an eight-acre ground at Mendalgief Road in 1955, boasted two football pitches and a rugby pitch, but suffered from poor changing facilities, whilst Central YMCA situated in the town centre, had better changing facilities, but no ground of their own. At the time of the merger Central YMCA ran five senior sides and Pill YMCA ran two senior sides and a range of junior sides.

The merger proved an instant success with the club running five senior teams plus junior teams from under-12s to under-18s. Cups and trophies came the club's way on an annual basis.

=== 1978–1981: Welsh Football League status ===
In 1978 after winning the Gwent Premier League four times in succession they gained election to the Welsh Football League.

Under the management of Michael Carvell the club worked its way up to the Premier Division, which at that time was the highest level of football in South Wales. In 1980–81 the club made it to the final of the Welsh Intermediate Cup (formerly known as the Welsh Amateur Cup) only to lose the game 1–0 to Connah's Quay Nomads.

=== 1982–1984: YMCA's high and low ===
The pinnacle of success came when the side finished in 3rd place in the Premier Division in 1982–83, their highest-ever finish in the Welsh football pyramid. Despite this high finish the creation of the ‘National Division’ for season 1983–84 effectively demoted the YM, their lack of facilities costing them a place in the newly created division.

=== 1990–1993: planning ahead ===
In 1990 The Board of Management at the YMCA decided to sell off the Central YMCA building and half of the land at Mendalgief Road, using the money to finance a new purpose-built facility in Pill. For one season the club were forced to play their home games at Somerton Park, home of Newport County, as uncertainty over the sale of the land and building work meant the club needed to find an alternative venue for home games.

After spending the 1990–91 season at Somerton Park the YM returned to their home at Mendalgief Road as the sale of the land failed to materialise, causing building work to be delayed. Unfortunately the uncertainty over events off the field transmitted itself to the football club and the retirement of older players plus the inability to attract new ones caused the club to suffer relegation at the end of the 1992–93 season.

=== 2000: New era for YMCA ===
The new building that was planned for 1991 eventually opened in January 2000 and this marked an upturn in the fortunes of the club. In season 2001–2002 the YMCA started their comeback back by winning the Division 3 championship. Two seasons later the club finished just one place below a promotion spot, but in season 2004–05 they secured a return to the top division of Welsh League football by finishing runners-up to Pontardawe in Division 2.

Newport YMCA celebrate their greatest victory

In the 2007–08 season the club were Welsh Cup Semi-finalists losing 3–1 to Bangor City at Latham Park in Newtown missing out on a cup final place. One year later and the club were on another cup run reaching the quarter-final of the Welsh Cup in the 2008–09 season losing out to Bridgend Town.

=== 2018: Merger with Pill ===
At the end of 2017–18 season, the team merged with Division Two club Pill AFC to form a new club, Pill YMCA. This club play in the Gwent County League Premier Division. At the end of the first season the club finished in 5th place in the league,

== Honours ==
- Welsh Football League Second Division: Champions: 1979 – Promoted to Division 1
- Welsh Football League First Division: 3rd place 1981 – Promoted to Welsh League Premier Division
- Welsh Football League Premier Division: 3rd place 1983 (Highest ever finish)
- Welsh Football League Third Division: Champions 2002 – Promoted to Second Division
- Welsh Football League Second Division: Runners-up 2005 – Promoted to Division 1
- Welsh Football League Reserve Division: Cup Winners 2005
- Gwent Premier League - Champions: 1974–75, 1975–76, 1976–77, 1977–78
- Monmouthshire/Gwent Senior Cup
  - Winners: 1974–75, 1975–76, 1977–78
  - Runners-up: 1976–77, 2003–04
- Monmouthshire/Gwent Amateur Cup
  - Winners: 1973–74, 1974–75
- Welsh Reserve League East: Winners 2007
- Welsh Cup: Semi-Finalists 2008 Quarter-Finalists 2009

== Local rival clubs ==
- Newport Civil Service
- Caerleon
- Llanwern
- Cwmbran Celtic
- Cwmbran Town
- Newport County

Newport YMCA had many local rivals in the city of Newport. Newport YMCA enjoyed clashes with cross-city rivals Caerleon and Llanwern. During the 2008–2009 season, they began a rivalry with Cwmbran Town, who had previously been relegated from the Welsh Premier League.

At youth level Newport YMCA had a rivalry with Newport County but at senior level the teams did not compete in the same league system. They used to play each other in an annual preseason friendly. The last time they met was in 2004, twice. First in the Gwent Senior Cup Final, in which County won the match 1–0 and during preseason in a Friendly match, which ended 1–1.
