= AFC Pontymister =

Association football club in Wales

- Ground: Longbridge Fields, Risca
- League: Gwent County League Division One
- 2025–26: Gwent County League Division One, 9th of 15
Home colours	Away colours

AFC Pontymister is a Welsh football team based in Pontymister, a village near Risca in Caerphilly County Borough, Wales. The team currently play in the Gwent County League Division One.

They play their home games at Longbridge Fields in Risca.

== History ==
The club was originally formed in the mid-1950s playing under a variety of names, which included Pontymister Rovers, Pontymister Rangers and plain Pontymister. There was a further name change to AC Pontymister in the late 1970s, after an enforced relocation of their home ground from Tanybryn to Pontymister Recreation Ground.

The club have been members of the Gwent County League since its formation at the start of the 1980s.

In 2008–09 they won Division Three and made it back-to-back promotions by winning Division Two in the following season. In 2016–17 they won Division One. In 2019 the league was renamed to the Gwent Premier League, and Pontymister remained in its top division, now renamed to the Premier Division.

The club changed its name once again, to AFC Pontymister, in 2022 after merging with a local youth side. After finishing 14th (third-bottom) in the 2022–23 season, they were relegated to Division One.

In the 2023–24 season, Pontymister reached the final of the Gwent County Amateur Cup. At the Pen y Pound Stadium, Pontymister came back from 1–0 down at half time to win 4–1.

== Honours ==
- Gwent County League Division One - Champions: 2016–17
- Gwent County League Division Two - Champions: 2009–10
- Gwent County League Division Three - Champions: 2008–09
- Gwent County FA Amateur Cup – Winners: 2023–24
