= RTB Ebbw Vale F.C. =

Association football club in Wales

Coordinates: 51°46′55.1″N 3°13′10.2″W

RTB Ebbw Vale Football Club
- Full name: RTB Ebbw Vale Football Club
- Nickname: Ts
- Founded: 1951
- Ground: Hilltop Stadium, Ebbw Vale
- Chairman: Grant Matthews
- Manager: Craig Morgan-Hill
- League: Gwent County League Premier Division
- 2025–26: Gwent County League Premier Division, 6th of 16

RTB Ebbw Vale Football Club are a Welsh association football club based in the town of Ebbw Vale, Blaenau Gwent, South Wales. The team was founded in 1951 as the football club of the Richard Thomas and Baldwins Steelworks. They currently play in the Gwent County League Premier Division.

They played in the Welsh Football League for two seasons in the early 2000s and in the tier 3 Ardal Leagues in early 2020s.

== History ==
RTB Ebbw Vale FC was formed in 1951 as part of the then Richard Thomas & Baldwin Steel Company (social section) and entered the Ebbw Vale & District League. In the early 1960s RTB, as they were to be known, joined the Mon Senior League. The club won the Mon Senior Cup in 1969-70 and were finalists in 1971 and 1973. They were crowned Division One Champions in 1973, just missing out on the double by losing in the cup final.

In 1980 the Mon Senior League was amalgamated with the Gwent Premier League to form the Gwent County League. As coach, Mike Cope led the club to promotion to the First Division of the Gwent County League as Division Two Champions in 1993–94 and Mike Williams, as player/manager led them to promotion to the Welsh Football League Division Three in 2000–01. In 2002 the club were runners up in the Gwent Senior Cup, losing 4–1 to Newport County at Caldicot. After two seasons in the Welsh League the club were relegated back into the Gwent County and have fluctuated between the First and Second Divisions ever since.

On 9 June 2022, it was announced that the club had been promoted to the tier 3 Ardal SE League for the 2022–23 season via the vacancy route.

== Honours ==
- Gwent County League Division One - Runners-Up: 2000–01
- Gwent County League Division Two - Champions: 1993–94; 2015–16
- Gwent County League Division Two - Runners-Up: 2007–08
- Gwent County Motors Cup - Runners-Up: 2015–16
- Gwent League Challenge Cup – Winners: 2014–15
- Gwent Amateur Cup - Runners-Up: 2015–16
- Mon Senior League - Champions: 1972–73
- Mon Senior Cup - Winners: 1969–70
- Mon Senior Cup - Runners-Up: 1970–71; 1972–73

== Welsh Football League history ==
Information in this section is sourced from the Football Club History Database and the Welsh Soccer Archive.

Season	Pyramid Tier	League	Final position
2001–02	4	Welsh Football League Division Three	16th
2002–03	4	Welsh Football League Division Three	17th (relegated)
2014–15	6	Gwent County League Division Two	5th
2015–16	6	Gwent County League Division Two	1st (promoted)
2016–17	5	Gwent County League Division One	4th
2017–18	5	Gwent County League Division One	13th
2018–19	5	Gwent County League Division One	8th
2019–20	4	Gwent County Premier Division	9th (when season cancelled)
2020–21	4	Gwent County Premier Division	Season cancelled
2021–22	4	Gwent County Premier Division	4th
