= Abertillery Bluebirds F.C. =

Association football club in Wales

Coordinates: 51°43′27.2″N 3°7′16.4″W

Abertillery Bluebirds
- Full name: Abertillery Bluebirds F.C.
- Founded: 1989
- Ground: Abertillery Leisure Centre
- League: Gwent County League Premier Division
- 2025–26: Ardal SE League, 16th of 16 (relegated)

Abertillery Bluebirds are a Welsh football team based in the town of Abertillery. They currently have a senior side in the Gwent County League Premier Division.

In May 2019 they returned to the Welsh Football League, gaining promotion from the Gwent County League. They had last played in the league in the 2013–14 season.

The club formed its junior section in 1992, initially with under-12 and under-14 teams.

== Honours ==
- Ardal SE – Champions: 2022–23
- Ardal SE – Runners-up: 2021–22
- Welsh Football League Division Two - Runners-up: 2009–10
- Gwent County League Division One – Champions (2): 2008–09; 2018–19
- Gwent County League Division One – Runners-up 2017–18
- Gwent County League Division Two – Champions: 2006–07
- Gwent County League Division Three – Runners-up: 2000–01
- North Gwent Football League Premier Division – Champions: 1999–00
- North Gwent Football League Division One – Champions: 1992–93
- Gwent County FA Amateur Cup – Winners: 2005–06, 2006–07, 2008–09
- Gwent County Motors Cup – Winners: 2006–07, 2017–18
- Gwent County FA Senior Cup – Winners: 2017–18
