= Ferndale Athletic F.C. =

Defunct Association football club in Wales

Ferndale Athletic Football Club
- Dissolved: 1999
- League: Welsh Football League Division Three
- 1997–98: 16th (of 16)

Ferndale Athletic Football Club are a Welsh football club from the town of Ferndale in Rhondda Cynon Taf, Wales. They played in the Welsh Football League for 42 seasons.

== History ==
The club joined the Welsh Football League for the 1956–57 season, and immediately saw success, finishing as runners-up in Welsh Football League Division Two East. They remained in the Welsh League until leaving the league after the 1997–98 season. The club folded the following year.

The club's best performance was the 1974–75 when they finished as runners-up by one point to Newport County's reserves side, in Premier Division, which was the top tier of league football in the south of Wales at the time.

The Club reformed in 2010. The brainchild of Micky (Villan) Evans(Life President)supported by Dean Gauvain and Rachel Millard All working tirelessly behind the scenes for a rejuvenated Ferndale Athletic Football Club, initially running junior football teams in the Aberdare Rhondda Merthyr Football League.

They are now for the first time since 1998 running a senior team playing in The Rhondda Football League on the newly re-furbished and relayed 4G pitch at Darren Park.

Current Officials.

Club Secretary :TBC

Chairman : Mr Dean Gauvain

Head Coach : Mr David Evans

== Honours ==
The following information is sourced from the club's entry on Football Club History Database.

- Welsh Football League Premier Division (Tier 1)
  - Runners-up: 1974–75
- Welsh Football League Division Two East (Tier 2)
  - Champions: 1961–62
  - Runners-up: 1956–57
- Welsh Football League Premier Division (Tier 2)
  - Runners-up: 1989–90
- Welsh Football League Division Two (Tier 3)
  - Champions: 1981–82
- South Wales Senior Cup
  - Runners-up: 1975–76

Aberdare Rhondda Junior League

Under 14s Cup Winners 2017

Under 16s League Winners 2017/18 18/19
