= Pill A.F.C. =

Association football club in Newport, Wales

Pill
- Founded: 2018
- Ground: The YMCA Ground; Mendalgief Road, Newport
- League: Gwent County League Premier Division
- 2025–26: Gwent County League Premier Division, 12th of 16
Home colours	Away colours

Pill Association Football Club is an association football club based in the Pillgwenlly area of the city of Newport, South Wales. The team currently play in the Gwent County League Premier Division.

== History ==
Pill YMCA was formed in May 2018 by the merger of former Welsh Football League club, Newport YMCA who were then playing in the Gwent County League Division One and Pill AFC who were in Division Two.

The club finished fifth and seventh in their first two seasons as a new club.

For the 2022–23 season the club reverted to 'Pill AFC' as the club's name.

== Honours ==
Gwent County League Motors Cup – Winners: 2024–25
