= Gwent Premier League =

- Founded: 1980
- Country: Wales
- Number of clubs: 41
- Level on pyramid: 4-6
- Promotion to: Ardal Leagues
- Relegation to: East Gwent League; Gwent Central League; Newport & District League; North Gwent League
- Domestic cup(s): Gwent Premier League; Challenge Cup
- Current champions: Newport Corinthians (2025–26)

The Gwent Premier League (known as the Autocentre Gwent Premier League for sponsorship reasons) is a football league in South Wales, consisting of three divisions, named the Premier Division, Division One and Division Two. The Premier Division is a feeder to the Ardal Leagues, and therefore sits at tier four of the Welsh football pyramid.

The league was formed in 1980 as the Gwent County League from a merger of the Monmouthshire Senior League and the Gwent Premier League. In 2019 it was renamed to the Gwent Premier League to avoid confusion with the lower-tier Gwent Central League.

== Member clubs for 2026–27 season ==
=== Premier Division ===
- Abertillery Bluebirds
- Abertillery Excelsiors
- Caerleon
- Cefn Fforest
- Clydach Wasps
- Graig Villa Dino
- Marshfield
- Monmouth Town
- Newport Saints
- Pentwynmawr Athletic
- PILCS
- Pill
- Rogerstone
- RTB Ebbw Vale
- Sifil
- Wattsville

=== Division One ===
- Aberbargoed Buds
- AFC Pontymister
- Albion Rovers
- Alway
- Brynmawr United
- Coed Eva Athletic
- Cwmcarn Athletic
- Fairfield United
- FC Tredegar
- Llanhilleth Athletic
- Lucas Cwmbran
- Machen
- Nantyglo
- Panteg
- Ponthir
- Pontnewydd United

=== Division Two ===
- Crickhowell
- Croesyceiliog Athletic
- Newbridge Town
- Pontnewynydd
- Rassau & Oak
- Riverside Rovers
- Thornwell Red & White
- Trinant
- Usk Town

== Champions ==
Season	Division One	Division Two	Division Three
1980–81			
1981–82	Fields Park Athletic	Llanfrechfa Grange	Spencer Youth & Boys
1982–83	Albion Rovers	Tredegar Town	Trinant
1983–84	Croesyceiliog	Spencer Youth & Boys	Gilwern
1984–85	Risca United	Pontnewydd Seniors	Chepstow Town
1985–86	Aberbargoed Buds	Lliswerry	Cwmtillery
1986–87	Albion Rovers	Cwmbran Celtic	Pill
1987–88	Albion Rovers	Pill	Newport Civil Service
1988–89	Albion Rovers	Newport Civil Service	Cefn Fforest
1989–90	Albion Rovers	Cefn Fforest	Abergavenny Thursdays
1990–91	Albion Rovers	Treowen Stars	Trethomas Rangers
1991–92	Treowen Stars	Chepstow Town	South Wales Switchgear
1992–93	Albion Rovers	Tredegar Town	Newbridge Town
1993–94	Cwmtillery	RTB Ebbw Vale	Lucas Cwmbran
1994–95	Croesyceiliog	Tredegar Town	Abercarn Town
1995–96	Pill	Monmouth Town	Girling Pontypool
1996–97	Chepstow Town	Girling Pontypool	Mardy
1997–98	Tredegar Town	Cefn Fforest	Cromwell Youth
1998–99	Spencer Youth & Boys	Abertillery Town	West Pontnewydd
1999–00	Spencer Youth & Boys	Clydach Wasps	Llanhilleth Athletic
2000–01	Spencer Youth & Boys	Trinant	Pentwynmawr Athletic
2001–02	Croesyceiliog	Goytre	Greenmeadow
2002–03	Aberbargoed Buds	Garnlydan Athletic	Cwmffrwdoer Sports
2003–04	Croesyceiliog	Coed Eva Athletic	Race
2004–05	Clydach Wasps	Cwmffrwdoer Sports	Rogerstone
2005–06	Aberbargoed Buds	Monmouth Town	Trethomas Bluebirds
2006–07	Newport Civil Service	Abertillery Bluebirds	Fairfield United
2007–08	Newport Civil Service	Pentwynmawr Athletic	Govilon
2008–09	Abertillery Bluebirds	Govilon	AC Pontymister
2009–10	Treowen Stars	AC Pontymister	Fleur-De-Lys Welfare
2010–11	Undy Athletic	Fleur-De-Lys Welfare	Pill
2011–12	Chepstow Town	Pill	Tredegar Athletic
2012–13	Lliswerry	Newport Corinthians	Ynysddu Crusaders
2013–14	Pill	Cwmffrwdoer Sports	Sebastopol
2014–15	Abergavenny Town	Malpas United	Cwm
2015–16	Trethomas Bluebirds	RTB Ebbw Vale	Villa Dino Christchurch
2016–17	AC Pontymister	Villa Dino Christchurch	Sudbrook Cricket Club
2017–18	Albion Rovers	Ynysddu Welfare	Rogerstone
2018–19	Abertillery Bluebirds	Newport Corinthians	Newport Saints

Season	Premier Division	Division One	Division Two
2019–20	Abertillery Excelsiors	Rogerstone	Cefn Fforest
2020–21	Competition cancelled	Competition cancelled	Competition cancelled
2021–22	Lliswerry	New Inn	Cwmffrwdoer Sports
2022–23	Aberbargoed Buds	Cefn Fforest	Mardy
2023–24	Croesyceiliog	Newport Saints	Marshfield
2024–25	Cwmbrân Town	Marshfield	Cwmcarn Athletic
2025–26	Newport Corinthians	Pentwynmawr Athletic	Brynmawr United
