= Croesyceiliog A.F.C. =

Association football club in Wales

Coordinates: 51°39′21″N 3°0′41.4″W

Croesyceiliog AFC
- Full name: Croesyceiliog Association; Football Club
- Founded: 1964
- Ground: Woodland Road
- Capacity: 200 (stand)
- Chairman: Marc Thomas
- League: Ardal SE League
- 2025–26: Ardal SE League, 6th of 16
- Website: www.croesyceiliogafc.co.uk
Home colours	Away colours

Croesyceiliog Association Football Club is a football club playing in Croesyceiliog, Cwmbran, Wales. They currently play in the Ardal SE League. The club was formed in 1964 as a youth team for pupils of Croesyceiliog School. It later entered a senior team in the Newport and District Football League and reached the Welsh Football League for the first time in 2004.

== History ==
Croesyceiliog was formed in 1964 by pupils at Croesyceiliog School after they reached an agreement with the school for the use of its sporting facilities. The club was initially formed as a youth team and joined the under-18 division of the Newport and District Football League the same year and later merged with Cwmbran Wanderers. The team entered a team in the senior league for the first time the following season, joining Division 2B of the Newport and District League. For the 1967–68 season, the league launched the Premier Division, of which Croesyceiliog became a founder member.

The club won the First Division of the Gwent County League during the 2001–02 season but were not promoted. The team achieved the feat again two seasons later and were subsequently promoted to the Welsh Football League for the first time in the club's history after finishing the campaign unbeaten. Croesyceiliog enjoyed early success in the Welsh Football League, winning consecutive promotions in its first two season to reach the First Division. The club suffered relegation to the Second Division in the 2008–09 season.

The 23/24 season became the clubs most successful season in its history. All senior teams were champions of their respective leagues with both the Reserves and Youth achieving league and cup doubles. The 1st team dominating the Gwent Premier, going on a 21 game unbeaten run with their star striker Owen Llewellyn scoring 40 league goals and the team over 100. The Reserves had a much tighter battle but still ended up winning the league by 9 points and securing the Vibez Senior Bowl 3-2 in a memorable game against their neighbours Croesyceiliog Athletic. The youth league came down to two teams fighting it out for the title with Croesyceiliog placing one hand on the trophy following a key 4-1 away win over 2nd placed Newport Corries with a few games remaining. The team scored 89 goals in only 14 matches with striker Jay Pelopida contributing 39 of those. As with the Reserves the Youth won the 'Youth Cup' with a dominant 6-2 display in the final.

For the first time in its history Croesyceiliog won 5 trophies in a single season with all 3 teams contributing to that landmark season.

During the club's history, four players have gone on to play professionally in the English Football League: Terry Cooper, Andy Dibble, Glyn Garner and Christian Doidge.

== Honours ==
- Welsh Football League Division Two
  - Runners-up: 2005–06
- Welsh Football League Division Three
  - Runners-up: 2004–05
- Gwent County League
  - Division One – Champions: 2001–02, 2003–04
  - Premier - Champions: 2023–24
- Monmouthshire/Gwent Senior Cup
  - Winners (4): 1985–86, 1986–87, 2002–03, 2006–07
- Monmouthshire/Gwent Amateur Cup
  - Winners (2): 1975–76, 2003–04
- Vibez Dennis Herbert Senior Bowl
  - Winners: 2023–24
- Gwent Premier Youth League
  - Champions: 2023–24
- Gwent Premier Youth Cup
  - Winners: 2023–24
- Newport and District Premier Y
  - Champions 2023-24
- Gwent Premier League County Motors Cup – Winners: 1982–83, 1994–95

== Club Officials ==
Position	Name
Chairman	(Wales) Marc Thomas
Secretary	(Wales) Stuart Brown
Vice Chairman	(Wales) Andrew Howells
Commercial Manager	(Wales) Chris Evans
Treasurer	(Wales) Sharon Williams
Lifelong President	(Wales) Robert Urie
Committee Members	(Wales) Alan Jones, Paul Couzens, Barry King, Sam Hoskin, Mario Natale, Jack Sainsbury, Kate Culleton

== Ground ==
The club is based at Woodland Road in Croesyceiliog, Cwmbran.

== 1st Team (Ardal Leagues South East) ==
=== Squad ===
Position	Name
Manager	James Kinsella
Assistant Manager	Mark Broom
Physio	Mark Broom

== The Development Squad ==
=== Coaching staff ===
Position	Name
Manager	(Wales) Wayne James
Assistant Managers	(Wales) N/A

== Miscellaneous ==
=== Notable former players ===
- (Wales) Terry Cooper
- (Wales) Andy Dibble
- (Wales) Glyn Garner
- (Wales) Christian Doidge
