= Caldicot Town F.C. =

Association football club in Wales

Coordinates: 51°35′29.3″N 2°45′14.6″W

Caldicot Town
- Full name: Caldicot Town Athletic Football Club
- Founded: 1953
- Ground: Jubilee Way
- Capacity: 1600
- Chairman: Archie McKay
- Manager: Tony Wallis / Mark Williams
- League: Ardal SE League
- 2025–26: Ardal SE League, 4th of 16
Home colours	Away colours

Caldicot Town Athletic Football Club is a Welsh football club. The team play in the Ardal SE League. They are based in the town of Caldicot, Monmouthshire and have a long running rivalry with nearby team based 5.8 miles away, Chepstow Town.

== History ==
Caldicot Town AFC has its beginning back in 1953. Then, with voluntary help from the community the necessary funds were raised and after much hard work two pitches were laid at King George V playing fields. The 'green wooden hut' was erected to serve as changing rooms with a small shower area. The club then entered the East Gwent League. In the 1963–64 season a second side was formed to play in the East Gwent Division 2.

Throughout the 1960s season the club was successful in winning the East Gwent Division 1 and 2 – the Watkins Shield – the Benevolent Cup – The Gill Cup and the Argus Shield.

In 1966 the Senior side joined the Monmouthshire Senior League Division, now known as the Gwent County League. During the late 1970s and early 80s the club won the Gwent Senior League Division 1, on two occasions, as well as winning the Senior Cup and Amateur Cup.

In December 1975 the original Clubhouse was built in Jubilee Way. This incorporated a small bar, a lounge, changing rooms and shower facilities. Since then the clubhouse has been modified and upgraded and now boasts four players changing rooms, a referees room, shower and toilet facilities, a large function room, a new lounge, a well equipped kitchen and outside patio areas complete with bench seats.

1979 saw the formation of Caldicot Town Junior Section. This gave local boys the opportunity to play competitive football at both local and County Level. It is also a source of future players for the senior teams.

In 1986, the club gained election into the Welsh Football League, following extensive preparation. To meet league standards, facility upgrades were required. Workers enclosed the ground with a high perimeter fence and installed a barrier around the pitch. Also the changing facilities were upgraded to meet official league requirements. Ongoing pitch maintenance includes annual re-seededing and regular upkeep. The ground now features covered spectator seating and floodlight system. Due to these upgrades, local and county organizations regularly select the venue to host representative games.

The club has played 24 seasons in the Welsh League, winning the Division 2 Championship 1989–90 and as runners up in Division 1 gained promotion to the top Division 1990/91.

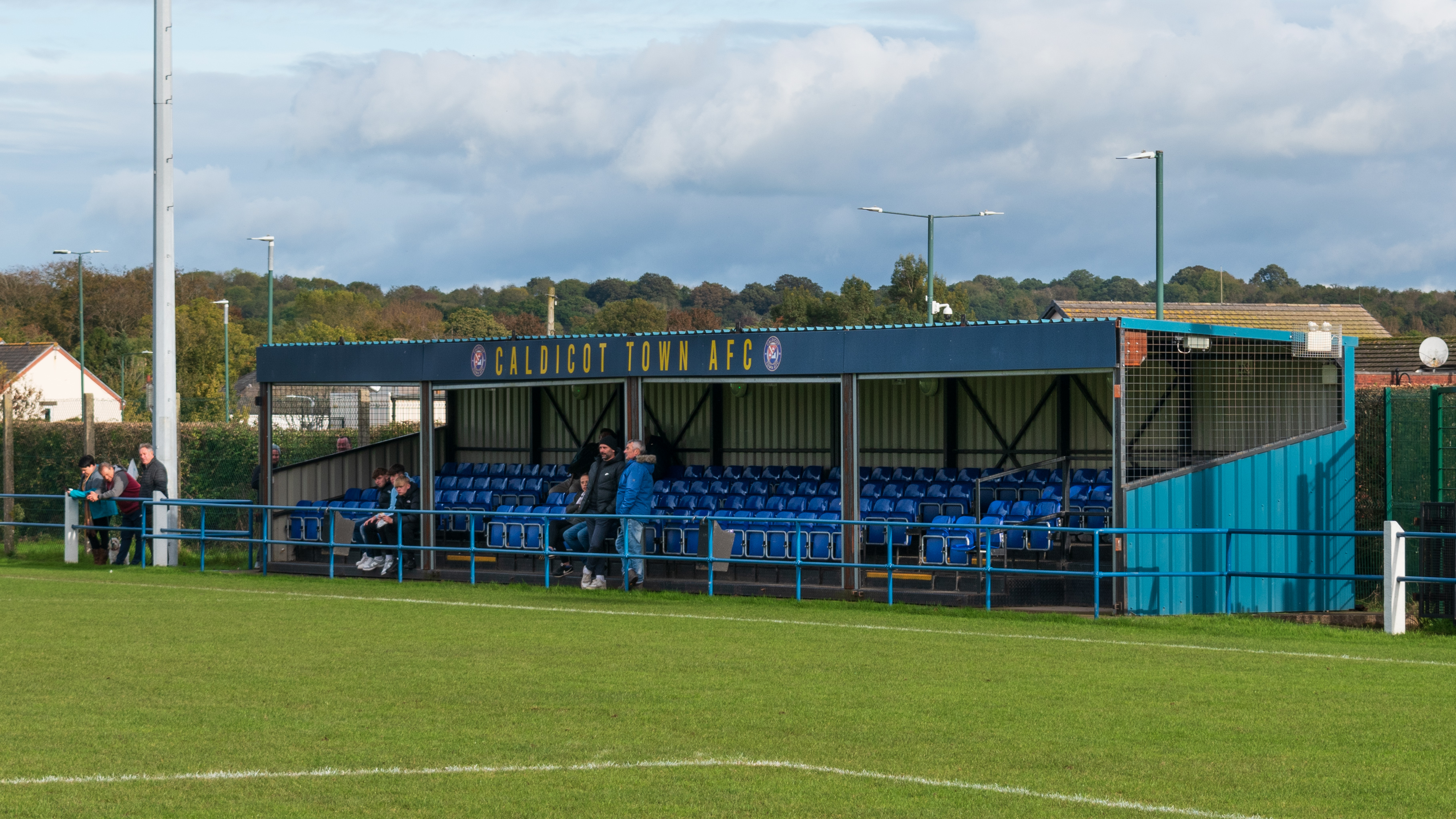
Main stand at Caldicot Town's Jubilee Way ground

1996 was a bad year for the Welsh League side with poor performances leading to relegation to Division Two. A further setback came at the end of the 1999–00 season when we relegated to Division Three. The Season 2001–02 saw us miss out on promotion on goal difference, but our fortune was to change 2002–03 season when we pipped Caerau Ely to promotion by 1 point after they lost their last game of the season away to Seven Sisters.

Season 2006–07 saw Caldicot return to the Welsh League 1st Division, finishing third behind champions Garw and runners-up Cambrian & Clydach. Season 2007–08 was Caldicot's first year back in the 1st division and should be hailed as a success as the team finished in a solid 11th place with the players competing well with the top sides. The first team also won the Gwent Senior Cup when they defeated Cwmbran Town in the semi-final and then Cwmbran Celtic in the final by a 1–0 scoreline. Caldicot struggled in their second season back in 2008–09 and finished 14th, having topped the table up till Christmas.

Season 2009–10 saw a return to management for Jason Pritchard, who shared duties with Simon Wetter. The side had their best season for some years, finishing fourth in the league. They were later relegated in 2010–11 to re-enter the second division for the 2011–12 season.

Season 2014-15 saw Caldicot miss out on promotion placed Risca United in third place by one point. Another fourth-placed finish for Caldicot meant they again missed out on promotion back to the second division after five years of trying to reach a third spot saw them maintain their position in the third division.

Season 2015-16 finally saw Caldicot promoted back to the second division after the six-year wait. Caldicot beat West End away 5–2 to secure the title after their rivals Undy Athletic missed out on the chance by not winning their game on the final day, allowing Caldicot the top spot by two points. Mark Williams management, successfully managed 24 wins in 30 games reaching back to the second division. Caldicot were joined by Undy Athletic and Cwmbran Celtic on their promotion.

Season 2016-17 saw Caldicot re-entered the third tier after a difficult first season back in the second tier. They placed 15th missing safety by a clear 10 points. Caldicot only managed to get 7 wins in 30 games in their first season back meaning they were relegated back to Welsh League Division Two as they were joined by Risca United.

== Current squad ==
As of June 2022.

Note: Flags indicate national team as defined under FIFA eligibility rules; some limited exceptions apply. Players may hold more than one non-FIFA nationality.

No.	Pos.	Nation	Player
—	GK	WAL	Mathew Sandiford
—	DF	WAL	Sam Watkins
—	DF	WAL	Matt James
—	DF	WAL	Harvey Cochrane
—	DF	WAL	Gethin Foster
—	DF	WAL	Matt Swann
—	DF	WAL	Jacob Guy
—	MF	NGR	Kazeem Kareem
—	DF	ENG	Benjamin Burns
—	DF	WAL	Alex Edwards
—	MF	WAL	Jake Clarke
—	MF	WAL	Sam Swann
—	MF	WAL	Richard Sharratt
—	FW	WAL	Jackson Dean
—	FW	WAL	Luke Evans
—	FW	WAL	Laurent Ngunjoh
—	FW	WAL	Ben Donoghue
—	FW	WAL	Ben Smith

== Youth Policy ==
Caldicot Town A.F.C. incorporates youth players into the first team. The organization maintains an Under 18's team and an Under 16's team in the Gwent County Youth League, as well as various junior teams.

== Honours ==
- Welsh Football League Division One (tier 3) – Champions: 1989–90
- Welsh Football League Division Two – Champions: 2015–16
- Gwent County FA Senior Cup – Winners: 1979–80, 1992–92, 2007–08, 2012–13
- Gwent County FA Amateur Cup – Winners: 1984–85
