= Newport Corinthians F.C. =

Association football club in Newport, Wales

Newport Corinthians
- Founded: 1961
- Ground: Coronation Park
- League: Ardal SE League
- 2025–26: Gwent County League Premier Division, 1st of 16 (promoted)

Newport Corinthians Football Club is an association football team based in the city of Newport, South Wales. They currently play in the Gwent County League.

== History ==
Newport Corinthians AFC was formed in 1961 by two friends, Alan Merton and Hedley Morgan as they wanted to play football together along with their friends and family. The club started off with humble beginnings, playing out of various pubs and clubs in the Newport and District League. Tredegar Park, Duffryn and Alfa Steel were pitches and parks used before finally settling at Coronation Park. During these years, The Corries played in the District and Gwent County Leagues as well as the domestic cups. In 1990 the current clubhouse was built.

In 2021, the Newport band Goldie Lookin Chain sponsored the team in their 60th anniversary season.

In 2025, the team were relegated from the Ardal Leagues due to an 18 point deduction.

== Honours ==
- Gwent Premier League – Premier Division
  - Champions: 2025–26
  - Runners-up: 2023–24
- Gwent County League Division Two – Champions: 2012–13; 2019–20
- Gwent County League Division Two – Runners-up: 2001–02
- Gwent County League Premier League Cup – Winners: 2022–23
- Gwent County FA Senior Cup – Winners: 2023–24, 2025–26
- Gwent County FA Senior Cup – Runners-up: 2022–23
- Gwent Premier League County Motors Cup
  - Winners: 1986–87, 2022–23, 2023–24
  - Runners-up: 2025–26
