= Abergavenny Thursdays F.C. =

Former association football club in Wales

Abergavenny Thursdays
- Full name: Abergavenny Thursdays Football Club
- Nicknames: Thursdays, The Pennies, The Butchers
- Founded: 1927
- Dissolved: 2013
- Ground: Pen-Y-Pound Stadium
- 2012–13: Gwent County League Division Three, 4th (of 15)
Home colours	Away colours

Abergavenny Thursdays Football Club was a Welsh football team based in Abergavenny, Monmouthshire. The club was founded in 1927 though several defunct clubs had existed in the town since the mid-19th century. It won the Welsh Football League title on two occasions in the late-1950s where it gained a reputation as one of the strongest teams competing in the Welsh leagues. The Thursdays won its last two titles prior to the founding of the League of Wales in 1992.

As a founder member of the new League of Wales, they competed in the Division's inaugural season. Financial issues at the start of the campaign led to an exodus of players and staff and the club suffered relegation after finishing bottom of the table. The club entered a decline in the ensuing years that saw it suffer seven relegations in ten seasons, ending its playing days playing in the Gwent County League Division 3. It withdrew from the league in August 2013 after agreeing with local side Govilon FC to merge and form a new club Abergavenny Town FC. The ground Penypound Stadium is run and maintained by the Thursday's Trust, thus preserving the history of the club.

== History ==
Records show that organised football was started in Abergavenny during the 1890s with the founding of Abergavenny Rangers. The team later became known as Abergavenny Rangers Thursdays before dropping Rangers from its name altogether in 1908. The Thursdays, who were unconnected to the first team formed in the town, were founded in 1927. The club's name derived from the fact that many Welsh towns gave workers a half-day on Thursdays, leading to the founding of many social clubs due to the free time.

The club won promotion to the top tier of the Welsh Football League in 1951. They won the Welsh Football League Cup in 1952 after defeating Caerau Athletic in the final. Eight years after entering Division One, the club won its first Welsh Football League title during the 1958–59 season, finishing 15 points clear of second placed side Cardiff City reserves after winning 28 of their 36 league matches. They retained the title the following year. They also reached the semi-final of the Welsh Cup during their second title winning season, the furthest the club ever advanced in the competition, suffering a defeat to Wrexham in a replay.

Thursdays' strong performances in the Welsh leagues led to an invitation to join the Southern Football League, part of the English football league system. The club eventually declined the offer in the hope of a Welsh national league being formed, an idea put forward by Llanelli after their request to join the Southern League was declined by the Football Association of Wales (FAW). Although there was strong support in the north of Wales for the idea, southern clubs playing in the English league system, such as Merthyr Tydfil and Barry Town, believed that the standard of competition was too low and resisted the move leading to its collapse. Several of the Thursdays' players during this era went on to join English Football League sides after performing well for the club, including Brian Evans and Danny McCarthy.

In the 1960s, the team remained in the top tier and finished as runners-up on three consecutive occasions between 1963 and 1965, losing out to Swansea Town reserves each time. Thursdays reached their second Welsh Football League Cup final in 1963 but suffered a defeat to Brecon Corinthians. They suffered consecutive relegations at the start of the 1970s, dropping into Division Two and did not return to the top tier of Welsh football until 1988.

=== League of Wales and decline ===
Success returned to the club in the 1990–91 season, when the club won the Welsh Football League for the first time in 31 years, and they retained the title a year later. They also won the Welsh Intermediate Cup in 1990–91 but were fined £100 in addition to having to forfeit their £750 prize money due to crowd trouble in the final. They became one of the founding members of the League of Wales, a new national division which promised European football for the highest-placed teams. However, prior to the start of the inaugural season, the club was required to provide a bond to the FAW as security to ensure that floodlights would be installed in time for the start of the campaign. Although Thursdays obliged, the money put a considerable strain on the club's financial resources and the ensuing uncertainty as to whether the club would be competing in the League of Wales led to a mass exodus of players, as well as the resignation of manager Ray Warren and coach John Lewis. Kyle Holmes, one of the few senior players who remained, was appointed player-manager in their place and quickly assembled a team in preparation for the start of the season. They suffered a 1–0 defeat against Bangor City on the opening day of the season before securing their first point a week later with a 1–1 draw with Porthmadog. However, Thursdays ended the first season of the League of Wales with relegation after finishing in last place.

Thursdays dropped to Division One of the Welsh Football League and finished 14th in their first campaign. Their second year brought some positive results back to the club after they finished fourth but another mass exodus of players followed and hope of a return to the League of Wales were soon forgotten. After low placed finishes in the following two seasons, Thursdays suffered a disastrous campaign in the 1997–98 season, failing to win any of their 36 league matches and conceding 210 goals which led to relegation to Division Two. After finishing 12th in their first season, the club entered a severe decline in which they suffered four successive relegations, dropping from Division Two of the Welsh Football League to Division Three of the regional Gwent County League, during which they conceded 675 goals. Their final relegation season, saw the club collect only two points in the Division Two of the Gwent County League as they failed to win a game.

In 2004, a supporter's trust, named The Thursdays Trust, was founded with the intention of taking over control of the club in an effort to stabilise its financial future. The trust included former manager Kyle Holmes and several former players. The trust took over ownership of the club and renovated several areas of the ground. Tentative approaches were made over a potential merger between the Thursdays and local side Mardy in 2006 but were eventually dismissed. The club's last 11 seasons were spent in the Third Division of the Gwent County League. In August 2013, Thursdays withdrew from the Gwent County League days before they were due to play Pontypool in their opening match of the 2013–14 season, citing a lack of players. The problem had been a longstanding issue within the local area and the Thursdays had struggled for consistent levels for a number of seasons.

Within a year of the old club's demise, a new club was formed to represent the town of Abergavenny – Abergavenny Town F.C.

== Honours ==
Welsh Football League Division 1

- Champions: 1958–59, 1959–60, 1990–91, 1991–92

Welsh Football League Cup

- Winners: 1951–52
- Runners-up: 1962–63

Monmouthshire/Gwent Amateur Cup

- Winners: 1961–62
