= Albion Rovers F.C. (Newport) =

Association football club in Newport, Wales

Albion Rovers
- Full name: Albion Rovers Football Club
- Founded: 1937; 89 years ago
- Ground: Kimberley Park, Newport
- Chairman: Tom Humph
- Manager: Terry Wilkins
- League: Gwent County League Division One
- 2025–26: Gwent County League Division One, 5th of 15
Home colours	Away colours

Albion Rovers Football Club is an association football club based in the city of Newport, South Wales who play in the Gwent County League Division One.

The team was formed by Scottish coalminers who moved to Newport for work in 1937. They named the team after Albion Rovers of their homeland in Coatbridge. They currently play at Crindau Park (also known as Kimberley Park) but have also shared Newport Stadium with Newport County.

Famous ex-players include Nathan Blake, Neil Swift, Tim Coleman, Sean Hamill, Bobby Campbell, Mike Harris, Kevin Hole, Michael Herbert. During the mid-1970s Peter Nicholas (Crystal Palace, Arsenal and Wales) and Tony Pulis (Premier League manager) also played for the Albion.

Between 1993 and 2005 the club played in the Welsh Football League, before at the end of the 2004–05 season being relegated to the Gwent County League.

On 24 July 2010, Albion Rovers played Premier League side Stoke City in a friendly to celebrate the opening of the clubhouse at Kimberley Park. Stoke won the match 9–0.

The club returned to the Welsh Football League in 2018 after 14 years by winning promotion. They finished bottom of the league at the end of the 2019–20 season and were relegated back to the Gwent County League, and in 2021–22 were relegated to Division One.

In 2023 the club released an unusual kit sponsored by Subway, where the entire shirt is made up of a pattern of repeated Subway logos.

== Honours ==
- Gwent County League
  - Division One – Champions: 2017–18
  - Division One – Runners-up: 2008–09, 2009–10, 2010–11, 2014–15
- Gwent County FA Senior Cup
  - Winners (3): 1947–48, 1980–81, 1988–89
- Gwent County FA Amateur Cup
  - Winners (7): 1946–47, 1959–60, 1986–87, 1987–88, 1989–90, 1990–91, 2014–15
- Gwent County League Motors Cup – Winners (4): 1980–81, 2007–08, 2014–15, 2016–17
- Gwent League Challenge Cup – Winners: 2018–19
