= Monmouth Town F.C. =

Association football club in Wales

Coordinates: 51°43′53.2″N 2°58′15.7″W

Monmouth Town
- Full name: Monmouth Town Football Club
- Nickname: The Kingfishers
- Founded: 1930
- Ground: Monmouth Sports Ground Blestium St Monmouth
- Chairman: Committee
- Manager: Scott Russell
- League: Gwent County League Premier Division
- 2025–26: Gwent County League Premier Division, 3rd of 16
- Website: https://www.monmouthtown.co.uk/
Home colours	Away colours

Monmouth Town Football Club is a Welsh football club based in the historic town of Monmouth. They currently play in the Gwent County League Premier Division.

== History ==
Association football was first played in Monmouth as early as February 1870. Regular association matches was played between Monmouth Grammar School and Troy FC (Mitchel Troy). By 1874, both teams had fully converted to rugby, and very rarely played association football over the next few years. At the beginning of the 1888/1889 season. Monmouth Association Football Club were formed. Their first match was a 6–3 win at home to Micheltroy. Monmouth lost their second match 5–0 away to Abergavenny AFC. During their third match, away to Micheltroy, one of Monmouth's players, T. T. Williams, a Monmouth Grammar School pupil, broke his leg during the match. The match was immediately abandoned. Monmouth were winning 2–1. Their fourth match was against a team called "Minstrels", where the Minstrels club played in costume. Monmouth won 5–2. Another match was announced at home to Abergavenny AFC, but it seems this match was not played. No other matches was reported during their first season. It seems Monmouth AFC only played 1 season, as there is no evidence to suggest that the club carried on playing after this season. There is evidence to suggest that an 'association club' was playing in all white at Dixton Road in the town in the year 1906. The Monmouth Beacon of 14 December recalls this and adds a comment about a period when football had been extinct in Monmouth. Indeed, research shows that Monmouth were joint champions of the Monmouth and District League in 1925–26 with Clearwell FC.

The next honour recorded by the Town was victory on the Monmouthshire Senior Cup on the eve of war in 1940, defeating Lovell's Athletic, (aka the Toffeemen) then about to lift the Southern League West title, 3–2 at Monmouth Sportsground which is still home today.

Nearly 20 years later, in 1958, the Town lifted the Monmouthshire Amateur Cup beating Cefn Fforest 3–0 at Pontllanfraith. The following season saw victories in both the Monmouthshire Senior and Monmouth Amateur cups.

Town's only appearance in the FA Cup was a 2nd preliminary round defeat away at Llanelli on 6 October 1945.

Silverware was scarce with wins in the Gwent Amateur Cup in 1984 and 1996 being highlights of many years gracing the fields of Newport and the Gwent Leagues with an occasional foray into the English Forest of Dean and Herefordshire leagues.

More recently the Town were relegated to the bottom tier of the Gwent County in 2004. The returning Andrew Smith took up the reins and gained promotion in his first season in charge finishing runners up to Rogerstone. At the beginning of 2005–06 season the club adopted 'the Kingfishers' nickname and logo in homage to a peculiar legend outlined later.

The season ended with fourteen match winning run as Town clinched the Gwent County Division Two title ahead of Newport Civil Service.

2006–07 almost saw a repeat but were Town were pipped by Civil for the title. However, The Kingfishers were offered the chance to take the step into the Welsh league for the first time in their history.

With Robin Pick and Barry Burns at the helm The Kingfishers won the Division Three title in 2010–11 and followed it with The Division Two title in 2011–12, Dan MacDonald scoring a remarkable 44 goals.

Their first ever season in Division One ended with a seventh-place finish after topping the table as late as March. The Kingfishers were also finalists in the Gwent Senior Cup for the first time since 1940 but lost out 1–0 to Caldicot Town.

16 times capped Steve Jenkins took over in June 2013 and after reaching the last sixteen of the Welsh Cup on 17 May 2014 The club clinched the Division One title, capping a remarkable rise up the divisions with a 2–0 win at Cwmbran Celtic.

A sixth-place finish was offset by winning the Gwent Senior cup for the first time since 1940 in a stunning 8–0 win against Panteg. During the four rounds Town scored 22 goals with just 2 against.

The club is a member of Gwent County F.A. On 8 August 2011, Monmouth Town F.C. entered into an agreement to be purchased by internet venture fivepoundfootballclub.com. In September 2011 the club established itself as a Community Interest Company, the first of its kind in Wales. The club's rally cry is "Kingfishers All The Way!"

After narrowly missing out on promotion in 2018–19 season and a change of manager, Monmouth Town F.C. announced Scott Russell as the new First Team Manager, Scott decided to leave his role as Goalkeeping Coach at Hereford F.C. to take on his new role at the Kingfishers in June 2019. He will be assisted by Steve Saunders and Dan Chance, both coaches were also at Hereford F.C. before joining the club with Scott. The management's aim for the 2019–20 season was to be competitive and look to take one of the three promotion places into the Welsh Championship (Tier 2), and to help develop the club as a whole and invest time into the impressive youth set up the club currently has.

== Colours and crest ==
The main colours for Monmouth Town F.C. are yellow and blue, which have been used throughout their recent history.

The Monmouth Town F.C. crest is a large yellow crest with a blue circle and text. The top of the circle has the name of the club in English, "Monmouth Town Football Club". Prominently positioned in the middle is a picture of the Kingfisher and the numbers 19 and 30 on either side of the bird. The name of the club in Welsh, "Clwb Pêl-Droed Trefynwy", adorns the bottom of the circle.

== Stadiums ==
Monmouth Town F.C. has spent over eight decades playing at Chippenham Sports Ground, located on Blestium Street in Monmouth. The current grandstand was originally sited at the Monmouth Racecourse on Vauxhall Fields and relocated in around 1920.

In August 2014 The club moved its first team to Pen Y Pound Stadium Abergavenny, to improve their chances of being able to take up any future promotion to the Welsh Premier League.

In May 2015 The club aborted their stay at Abergavenny citing a breakdown in the relationship and returned to Monmouth.

== Support ==
Having recently agreed to be purchased by FivePoundFootballClub.com, the Kingfishers have an international following among Welsh teams. With part-owners spanning multiple countries, the club has made efforts to expand their online presence. Kingfisher TV recently began broadcasting from YouTube.

== Ownership and finances ==
In 2011, Monmouth Town was selected to gain funding from Five Pound Football Club, where members could play £5 for a small stake in the ownership of the club.

== Honours ==
- Monmouth & District League Winners: – 1926
- Monmouthshire/Gwent Senior Cup Winners: – 1940, 2015
- Monmouthshire/Gwent Amateur Cup Winners: – 1957–58, 1958–59, 1983–84, 1995–96
- Gwent County Division 3 Runners up: – 2005
- Gwent County Division 2 Champions: – 2006
- Gwent County Division 1 Runners up: – 2007
- Welsh League Division Three Champions: – 2010–11
- Welsh League Division Two Champions: – 2011–12
- Welsh League Division One Champions: – 2013–14

== Staff ==
- President: Terry Cleaves
- Chairman: Rob Laurie
- Vice Chairman: David Uttley
- Youth Chairman: Paul Burke
- Club Secretary: Peter Jefferies
- Youth Secretary: Karen Scott
- Youth Goalkeeping Coach: Scott Russell
- Club Captain: Ash Ford
- Assistant Secretary: Vacant
- Treasurer: Ben Gouldingay
- Commercial Manager: Rob Laurie
- IT Comms: Dan Evans
- Child Welfare Officer: Jonty Wright
- First Team Manager: Scott Russell
- First Team Assistant Manager: Dan Chance
- Data Analysis: Alex Jenkins
- Reserve Team Manager: Richard Finn
- Club Physiotherapist: John Fitzgerald

=== Supporters club ===
- Chair: Nicola Johns
- Board President: Steve Hughes
- Finance Officer: Vacant
- Media Relations: James Cart

== See also ==
- Monmouth
