= Aberbargoed Buds F.C. =

Association football club in Wales

Coordinates: 51°41′41.2″N 3°13′10.1″W

Aberbargoed Buds
- Full name: Aberbargoed Buds Football Club
- Nickname: The Buds
- Founded: 1957
- Ground: Aberbargoed Recreational Ground
- Chairman: Lewis Jones
- Manager: Rob Shorney
- League: Gwent County League Division One
- 2025–26: Gwent County League Division One 4th of 15
- Website: https://www.pitchero.com/clubs/aberbargoedbudsfc2
Home colours	Away colours

Aberbargoed Buds Football Club is a football club based in Aberbargoed, Wales. They currently play in the Gwent County League Division One.

== History ==
Aberbargoed Buds was founded in 1957 after the previous team in the area, Aberbargoed Town, folded in 1949. The Buds, believed to be an abbreviation of "Bedwellty Urban District sides", began playing in the West Monmouthshire League before there was a reorganisation of the league structure and moved to the Gwent County League. The Buds won the Gwent Cup in 1984 and their first Gwent Championship in 1985–86.

In 1999, Aberbargoed Town who had reformed in 1986 approached the Buds' committee to amalgamate the Town with the current Buds who were on the verge of folding leading up to the 1999–2000 season. The Town committee agreed to this arrangement which kept the Buds in the Gwent County League and the Town, now known as the seconds, in the North Gwent League. In 2001–02 the Buds won the Gwent Cup defeating Llanhilleth 3–0 and then retained the trophy the following year by defeating Blaenavon Blues 6–0. The Buds won the Gwent County League to complete a double but were not promoted to the Welsh League Division Three due to a lack of facilities.

Having finished runners up in the following season (2003–04) and then third the season after (2004–05) managers Graham Owen and John Randall stood down. Former player Neil Thomas became manager. The club once again won the league during the 2005–06 season, which was decided in the last game of the season with the Buds defeating the reigning champions Clydach Wasps 4–1 to take the league title and gain promotion to Welsh League Football for the 2006–07 season.

The Buds have twice reached Division One of the Welsh Football League but suffered relegation after a single season on both occasions, the most recent campaign being the 2015–16 season.

At the end of the 2021–22 Ardal SE season the club initially finished in 12th places but were deducted 30 points by the Football Association of Wales and relegated, after finishing bottom of the revised divisional table.

In 2024, the club was taken over by Aberbargoed Town, a local side in the North Gwent Football League after the Buds faced difficulties on and off the pitch. The new merged club dropped down from the Ardal Leagues to the Gwent County League Division One.

== Honours ==
- Amateur Cup – Winners: 1977–78, 1979–80, 1983–84
- Gwent Cup – Winners: 1983–84, 2001–02, 2002–03
- Gwent County League Premier Division – Champions: 2022–23
- Gwent County Division One – Champions: 1985–86, 2002–03, 2005–06
- Gwent County Division Two – Runners-up: 2012–13
- Gwent County FA Senior Cup – Winners: 1978–79, 1987–88, 2022–23
- Monmouthshire/Gwent Amateur Cup – Winners: 1977–78, 1979–80, 2025–26
- Gwent Premier League County Motors Cup – Winners: 2001–02, 2002–03
