= Caerleon A.F.C. =

Association football club in Wales

Caerleon
- Full name: Caerleon Association Football Club
- Nickname: The Romans
- Founded: 1902
- Ground: Cold Bath Road, Caerleon, Newport
- Capacity: 1,200
- Chairman: Don Prosser
- Manager: Nicky Davies
- League: Gwent County League Premier Division
- 2025–26: Gwent County League Premier Division, 7th of 16
Home colours	Away colours

Caerleon Association Football Club is an association football club based in the Roman village of Caerleon on the northern outskirts of the City of Newport, South Wales. The team currently play in the Gwent County League Premier Division.

The club's crest depicts the former Roman legionary fortress at Caerleon. The name of the home ground, Cold Bath Road, has Roman origins and is close to several Roman architectural remains.

== Club history ==
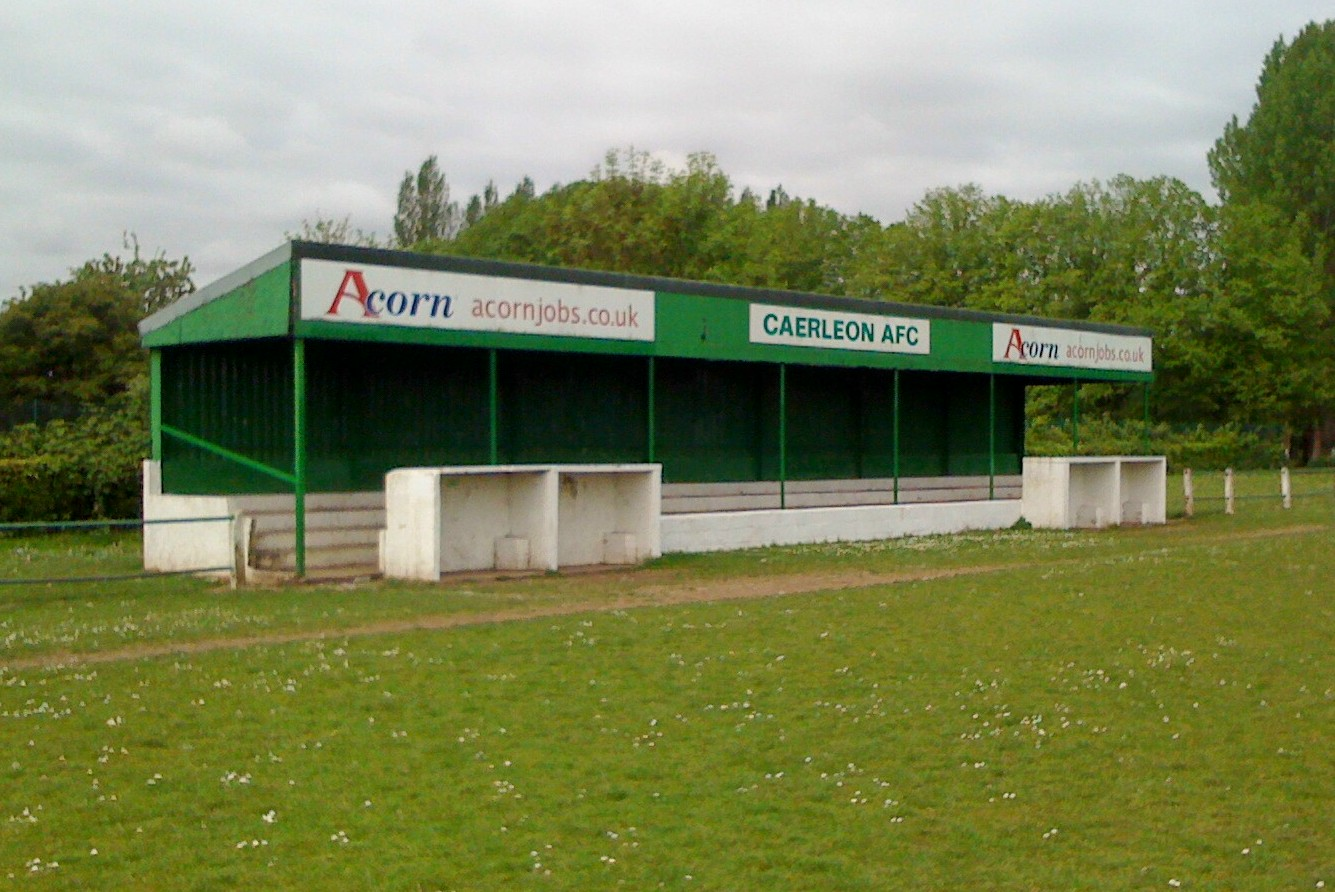
Cold Bath Road

A Caerleon club were members of the South Wales League in its first two seasons, between 1890 and 1892.

Caerleon claim to have been founded in 1893.

A football club in Caerleon was founded in 1902, running teams in both association football and rugby football. In 1903, they joined the Newport & District Football League, having been rejected the previous season due to not being based in Newport. A club named Caerleon Athletic appeared in the FA Cup in the 1913–14 and 1914–15 seasons, losing in the first qualifying round and in the preliminary round.

Caerleon joined the Welsh Football League in the 1965–66 season, having previously played in the Monmouthshire Senior League. They finished the season as Division 2 champions and also won the Welsh Amateur Cup, beating Welshpool in the final at Llanidloes. Caerleon were also Division 1 champions in 1967–68. Caerleon played in the top division of the Welsh League until relegation in 1977.

Caerleon were promoted again to the top division after the 1979–80 season when they were runners-up in the league. The following five seasons were successful as they finished in the top five league positions three times.

Caerleon retained their place in the top division until relegation came after the 1988–89 season. The club reached its lowest point when further relegations in 1995–96 and 1996–97 seasons left them in the Welsh League Division 3.

Fortunes turned with back-to-back promotions in 1998–99 and 1999–00. Caerleon were at last back in the top division; the Welsh Football League First Division. An unlikely success also came in the 1999–00 Welsh Cup when Caerleon reached the quarter-final, losing 4–1 at home to Bangor City.

Caerleon resided in the Welsh Football League Division One for numerous seasons but were relegated to Division Two for the 2010–11 season. They finished in third place in Division Two in the 2011–12 season and were promoted back to Division One.

== Honours ==
=== Leagues ===
- Welsh Football League
  - Division One – Champions: 1967–68
  - Division Two – Champions: 1965–66
  - Division Three – Champions: 1998–99
- Mon Senior League
  - Division One – Winners: 1959–60
- Newport and District Football League
  - Premier 'X' – Champions: 1950–51, 1952–53

=== Cups ===
- Welsh Amateur Cup
  - Winners: 1965–66
- Monmouthshire/Gwent Senior Cup
  - Winners: 1993–94
- Monmouthshire Amateur Cup
  - Winners: 1954–55, 1963–64, 1965–66
- Monmouthshire County F.A. Youth Cup
  - Winners: 1970–71
- Woodcock Cup:
  - Winners: 1907
