= 2016–17 Welsh Cup =

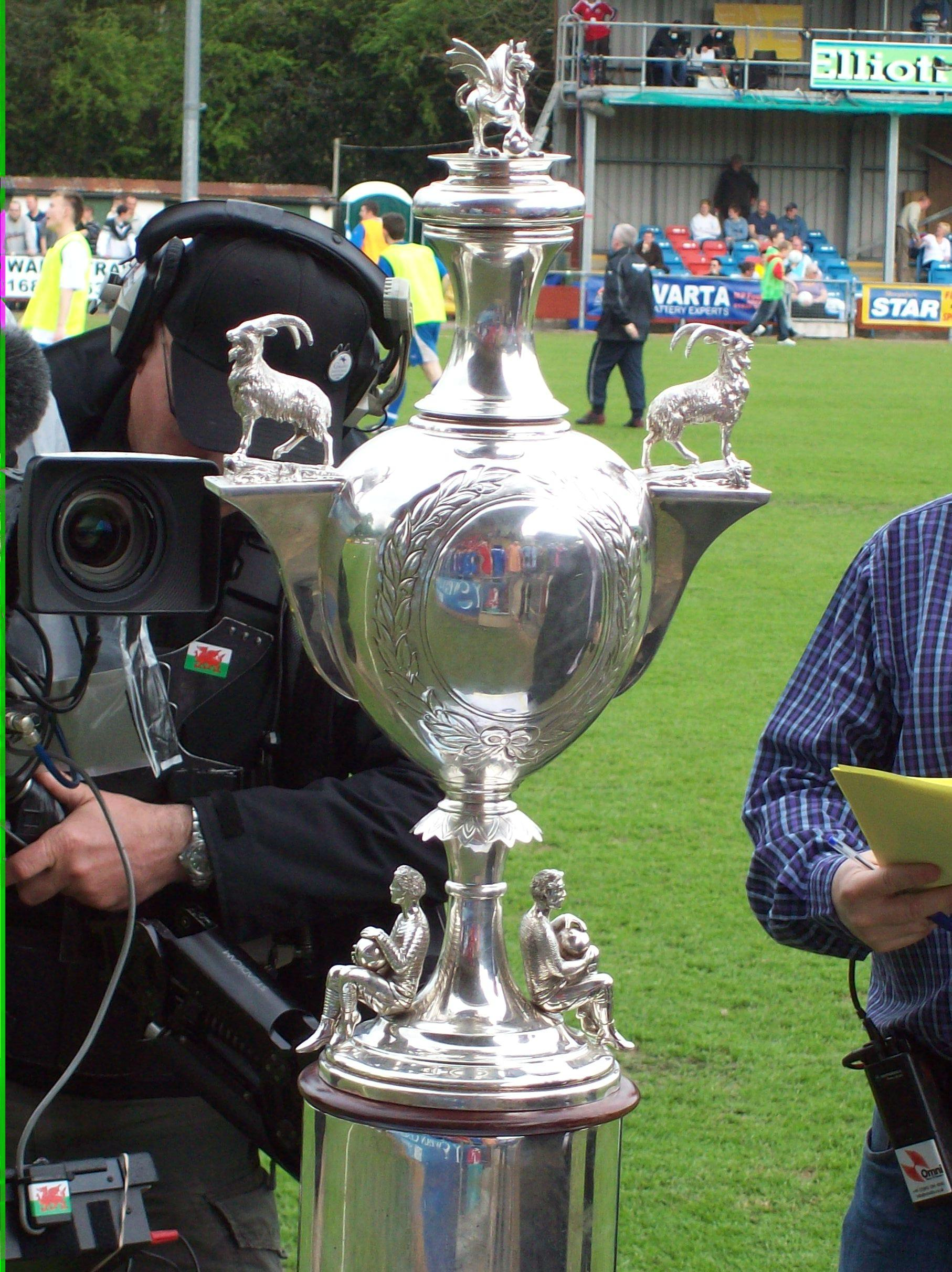
- The Welsh Cup

Tournament details
- Country: Wales
- Teams: 193

Final positions
- Champions: Bala Town
- Runners-up: The New Saints

The 2016–17 FAW Welsh Cup is the 130th season of the annual knockout tournament for competitive football teams in Wales. The defending champions are The New Saints, having defeated Airbus UK Broughton 2–0 in the previous year's competition. The total prize money for 2015–16 was set at £180,000.

== First qualifying round ==
The First Qualifying Round featured teams outside of the top two tiers of Welsh football league system. The matches in the first qualifying round were played on 19, 20, 21, and 27 August 2016 and was regionalised into North-west, North-east, Central, South-west and South-east.

Team 1	Score	Team 2
19 August
Llansantffraid Village	3–4	Abermule
20 August
AFC Brynford	6–3	Cefn Albion
Coedpoeth United	3–2	Acton
FC Penley	1–2	Sychdyn
Lex Gwyndwr	4–1	Rhostyllen
Mynydd Isa Spartans	1–5	Greenfield
Rhydymwyn	4–1	Castell Alun Colts
Amlwch Town	1–2	Mochdre Sports
Cemaes Bay	4–2	Blaenau Ffestiniog
Dyffryn Nantlle	3–2	Pwllheli
Gaerwen	3–2 (a.e.t.)	Llanfairfechan Town
Llandudno Albion	7–1	Llanfairpwll
Llanllyfni	7–3	Llanystumdwy
Llanrwst United	1–4	Penmaenmawr Phoenix
Meliden	1–3	Pentraeth
Prestatyn Sports	w/o	Gwalchmai
Y Felinheli	6–5	Llandyrnog United
Berriew	5–0	Trewern
Brecon Corries	3–1	Kerry
Montgomery Town	3–2	Tywyn Bryncrug
Presteigne St Andrews	2–3	Borth United
Waterloo Rovers	4–4 (a.e.t.); 6–7 (p)	Newbridge-on-Wye
Bettws	w/o	CP Suburbs
Cefn Cribbwr	2–4	Trefelin BGC
Ely Rangers	7–0	Llandovery
Hirwaun	0–2	Penlan Social
Newcastle Emlyn	0–6	Porthcawl
Llangynwyd Rangers	1–2	Pontyclun
Llantwit Major	2–0	Garw
Penrhiwfer	2–5	Hirwaun Sports
Pontypridd Town	4–0	Team Swansea
Ynysygerwn	4–1	Treforest
Abergavenny Town	6–4	Chepstow Town
Abertillery Bluebirds	2–3	Treowen Stars
AFC Perthcelyn	0–4	Aber Valley
Bridgend Street	4–1	AFC Butetown
Caerleon	5–3	Cwm Welfare
Dynamo Aber	5–3	Penrhiwceiber Rangers
Gelli Hibernian	0–6	Dinas Powys
Llanrumney United	2–1 (a.e.t.)	Cwmbrân Town
Merthyr Saints	5–2	Cardiff Hibernian
Newport YMCA	4–1	Cardiff Corinthians
Risca Whiteheads	0–3	Nelson Cavaliers
STM Sports	2–0	Llantwit Fardre
Sully Sports	4–0	Clwb Cymric
Tiger Bay	2–1	Blaenavon Blues
Trethomas Bluebirds	3–2	Panteg
Wattsville	0–4	Tredegar Town
21 August
Llangollen Town	3–4	Llanuwchllyn
27 August
RTB Ebbw Vale	3–1	Newport City
Caerau	1–0	West End
Blaenrhondda	1–0	Ynysddu Welfare
Mynydd Llandegai	5–0	Menai Bridge Tigers

== Second qualifying round ==
The matches of the Second Qualifying Round were played on 9 and 10 September 2016. The draw was regionalised into South, North and Central groupings.

Team 1	Score	Team 2
9 September
Aberdare Town	0–1	Trethomas Bluebirds
10 September
Aberbargoed Buds	4–2	Dynamo Aber
Abergavenny Town	4–3 (a.e.t.)	Aber Valley
AFC Porth	2–1 (a.e.t.)	AFC Llywdcoed
Ammanford	0–1	Ynysygerwn
Bettws	1–11	Trefelin BGC
Bridgend Street	2–0	STM Sports
Caerau	2–0	Briton Ferry Llansawel
Cwmamman United	5–1	Porthcawl Town Athletic
Ely Rangers	1–4	Croesyceiliog
Dinas Powys	0–1	Merthyr Saints
Hirwaun Sports	2–2 (a.e.t.); 3–4 (p)	Pontardawe Town
Llanelli Town	3–1	Pontypridd Town
Pontyclun	4–3 (a.e.t.)	Garden Village
Llantwit Major	2–1 (a.e.t.)	Penlan Social
Nelson Cavaliers	0–4	Blaenrhondda
RTB Ebbw Vale	2–1	Llanrumney United
Newport YMCA	3–2	Caerleon
Sully Sports	4–1	Tiger Bay
Treowen Stars	1–0	Tredegar Town
Abergele Town	7–3	Pentraeth
Brymbo	6–1	Llay Welfare
Cemaes Bay	1–5	Prestatyn Sports
Coedpoeth United	2–0	AFC Brynford
Corwen	4–1	FC Queens Park
Dyffryn Nantlle	5–3	Glan Conwy
FC Nomads of Connah's Quay	3–1	Brickfield Rangers
Gaerwen	0–1	Llangefni Town
Lex XI	3–2	Chirk AAA
Llanberis	7–2	Penmaenmawr Phoenix
Llandudno Albion	4–2	Llanllyfni
Llandudno Junction	2–3	Mynydd Llandegai
Llanrug United	4–0	Penrhyndeudraeth
Mochdre Sports	0–3	St. Asaph City
Rhydymwyn	1–3	Hawarden Rangers
Saltney Town	2–4	Penycae
Sychdyn	0–7	Greenfield
Trearddur Bay United	0–1	Glantraeth
Y Felinheli	2–3	Barmouth & Dyffryn United
Aberaeron	2–1	Montgomery Town
Abermule	1–6	Llanuwchllyn
Borth United	1–3	Welshpool Town
Bow Street	0–2	Brecon Corries
Carno	3–0	Knighton Town
Hay St Marys	1–2	Llanrhaeadr Ym Mochnant
Llanidloes Town	4–2	Berriew
Newbridge-on-Wye	2–6	Llandrindod Wells
Rhayader Town	6–2	Machynlleth

== First round ==
The First Round matches were played on 29 and 30 September 2016 and 1, 2, 4, and October 2016. This round was regionalised to North and South groups and included teams from the second tier of Welsh football.

Team 1	Score	Team 2
29 September
Guilsfield	6–3	Welshpool Town
30 September
Conwy Borough	1–5	Caernarfon Town
Trethomas Bluebirds	0–6	Llanelli Town
1 October
Aberaeron	1–4	Caldicot Town
Merthyr Saints	2–3	Llandrindod Wells
Sully Sports	2–6	Llantwit Major
Croesyceiliog	1–1 (a.e.t.); 2–4 (p)	Goytre United
Cambrian & Clydach	1–3	Trefelin
Aberbargoed Buds	0–5	Barry Town United
Afan Lido	4–1	Pontyclun
Newport YMCA	1–2	Haverfordwest County
Ton Pentre	4–2	Abergavenny Town
RTB Ebbw Vale	1–2	Ynysygerwn
Pen-y-Bont	3–1	AFC Porth
Undy Athletic	3–0	Blaenrhondda
Bridgend Street	2–2 (a.e.t.); 4–5 (p)	Goytre
Mold Alexandra	4–0	Llanberis
St Asaph City	0–8	Prestatyn Town
Llanrhaeadr	5–3	Prestatyn Sports
Greenfield	3–2	Llandudno Albion
Dyffryn Nantlle Vale	0–3	Holyhead Hotspur
Lex XI	1–2	Corwen
Flint Town United	6–0	Penycae
Hawarden Rangers	2–1	Carno
Abergele Town	0–2	Llanrug United
Gresford Athletic	3–0	Denbigh Town
Llanuwchllyn	0–3	Ruthin Town
Llangefni Town	4–0	Brymbo
Glantraeth	3–5	Mynydd Llandegai
Coedpoeth United	0–8	Holywell Town
Porthmadog	4–0	Caersws
Llanidloes Town	0–2	Llanfair United
2 October
Monmouth Town	1–0	Brecon Corries
4 October
Penrhyncoch	2–0	FC Nomads of Connah's Quay
Rhayader Town	4–3	Caerau (Ely)
Taff's Well	0–0 (a.e.t.); 5–3 (p)	Port Talbot Town
8 October
Barmouth & Dyffryn United	0–2	Buckley Town
Pontardawe Town	1–0	Cwmbran Celtic
Cwmamman United	2–0	Caerau
Treowen Stars	4–1	Risca United

== Second round ==
The Second Round matches were played on 4 and 5 November 2016. This round was regionalised into North and South groups.

Team 1	Score	Team 2
4 November
Afan Lido	1–0	Pontardawe Town
Taff's Well	2–3	Llanelli Town
5 November
Mold Alexandra	2–4 (a.e.t.)	Guilsfield
Llangefni Town	4–4 (a.e.t.); 3–4 (p)	Caernarfon Town
Hawarden Rangers	1–4	Prestatyn Town
Buckley Town	1–6	Corwen
Holywell Town	6–0	Llanrhaeadr
Penrhyncoch	3–0	Ruthin Town
Porthmadog	2–2 (a.e.t.); 3–1 (p)	Gresford Athletic
Mynydd Llandegai	0–3	Greenfield
Flint Town United	3–4	Llanfair United
Holyhead Hotspur	2–1	Llanrug United
Rhayader Town	1–2	Goytre
Haverfordwest County	3–2	Undy Athletic
Llantwit Major	1–0	Llandrindod Wells
Treowen Stars	1–2	Ton Pentre
Trefelin BGC	0–1 (a.e.t.)	Goytre United
Ynysygerwn	7–3	Monmouth Town
Barry Town United	0–3	Pen-y-Bont
Caldicot Town	2–0	Cwmamman United

== Third round ==
The Third Round matches were played on 2, 3, and 10 December 2016. This round was not regionalised and a free draw.

Team 1	Score	Team 2
2 December
Llanelli Town	5–1	Ynysygerwn
3 December
Greenfield	0–3	Guilsfield
Caernarfon Town	3–1	Carmarthen Town
Prestatyn Town	2–1	Holyhead Hotspur
Pen-y-Bont	4–1	Airbus UK Broughton
Aberystwyth Town	2–0	Holywell Town
Llanfair United	1–0	Corwen
Haverfordwest County	1–0	Afan Lido
Rhyl	6–0	Penrhyncoch
Bala Town	6–1	Caldicot Town
Cardiff Met University	4–0	Porthmadog
Newtown	0–3	The New Saints
Connah's Quay Nomads	3–2	Goytre United
Llandudno	0–2	Goytre
10 December
Ton Pentre	0–2	Bangor City
Cefn Druids	2–0	Llantwit Major

== Fourth round ==
The Fourth Round matches were played on 28 January 2017. This round was not regionalised and a free draw.

Team 1	Score	Team 2
28 January
Aberystwyth Town	1–5	Prestatyn Town
Llanfair United	4–1	Cefn Druids
Bangor City	4–0	Llandudno
Bala Town	4–1	Pen-y-Bont
Guilsfield	4–2	Cardiff Met University
Haverfordwest County	1–5	Connah's Quay Nomads
The New Saints	7–0	Llanelli Town
Caernarfon Town	3–2	Rhyl

== Fifth Round ==
The Fifth Round matches were played on 25 February 2017. This round was not regionalised and a free draw.

Team 1	Score	Team 2
25 February
The New Saints	2–1 (a.e.t.)	Bangor City
Llanfair United	0–7	Caernarfon Town
Guilsfield	0–3	Bala Town
Prestatyn Town	2–2 (a.e.t.); 3–4 (p)	Connah's Quay Nomads

== Semi-finals ==
Team 1	Score	Team 2
1 April
Caernarfon Town	1–3	Bala Town
Connah's Quay Nomads	0–3	The New Saints

== Final ==
Team 1	Score	Team 2
30 April
Bala Town	2–1	The New Saints
