= 2018–19 Welsh Cup =

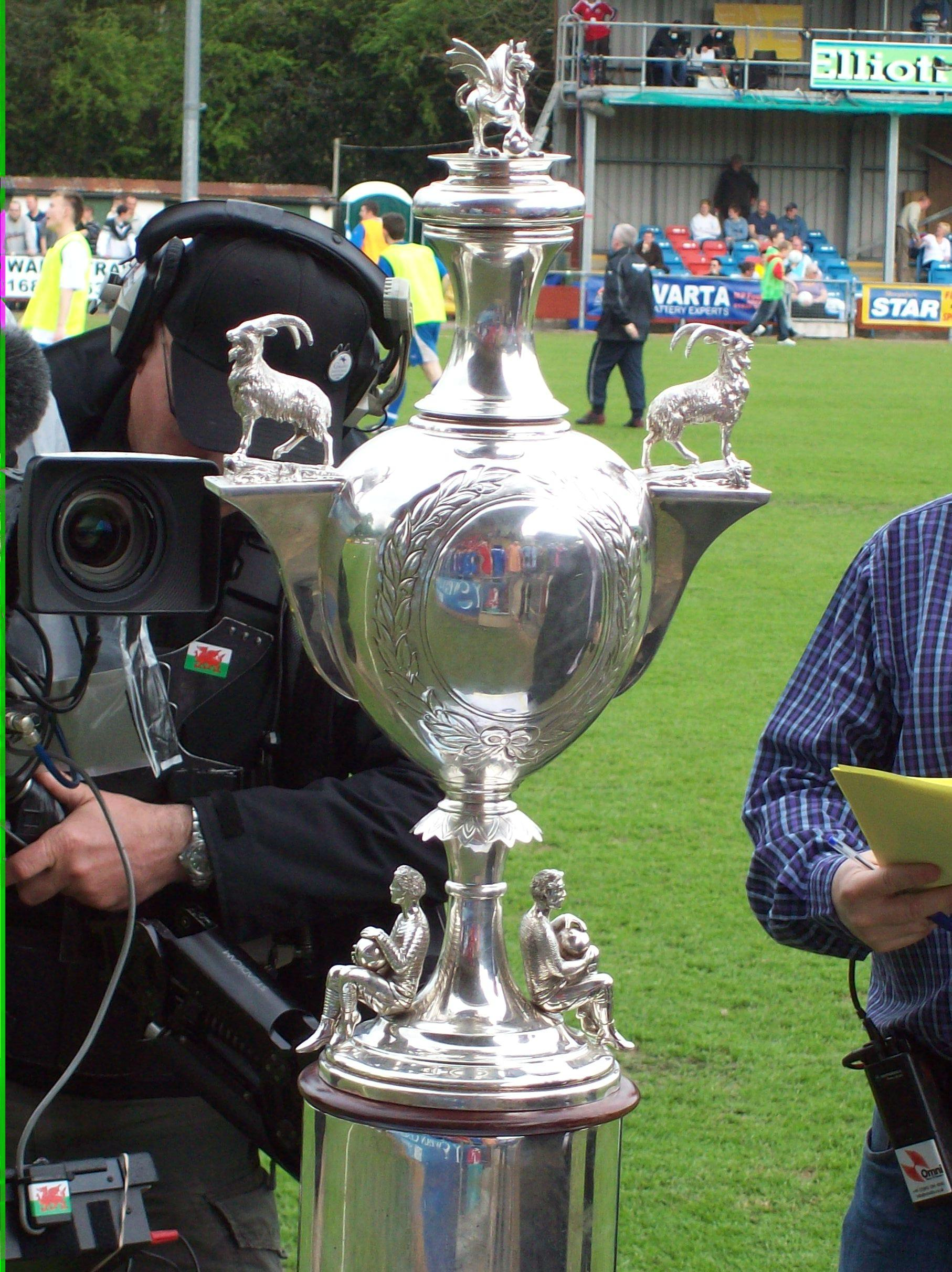
- The Welsh Cup

Tournament details
- Country: Wales

Final positions
- Champions: The New Saints
- Runners-up: Connah's Quay Nomads

The 2018–19 FAW Welsh Cup was the 132nd season of the annual knockout tournament for competitive football teams in Wales.

== First qualifying round ==
Team 1	Score	Team 2
Saturday 8 September
Penycae (3)	2–0	Offa Athletic (4)
Treforest (6)	0–3	Panteg (3)
Dyffryn Nantlle Vale (3)	9–1	Gaerwen (4)
Blaenrhondda (4)	2–2 aet (7–6 pens)	Penrhiwceiber Rangers (4)
Tredegar Town (4)	3–3 aet (6–7 pens)	Cwmbrân Town (5)
Glantraeth (5)	4–6	Penmaenmawr Phoenix (4)
Penydarren BGC (4)	7–4	Blaenavon Blues (5)
Holyhead Town (4)	3–2	Menai Bridge Tigers (5)
Treharris Athletic Western (4)	8–1	Aberystwyth Exiles (8)
Pwllheli (4)	3–3 aet (5–3 pens)	CPD Llannefydd (4)
Pill YMCA (5)	4–3	Ely Rangers (4)
Trearddur Bay United (4)	w/o	Meliden (4)
Newport Corinthians (5)	1–4	Cardiff Draconians (5)
Rhydymwyn (3)	4–3 (a.e.t.)	Llangollen Town (4)
Aber Valley (6)	3–2	Canton Liberal (5)
Rhosllanerchrugog (4)	0–4	Rhos Aelwyd (3)
Ynysddu Welfare (5)	2–1	Machen AFC (6)
Castell Alun Colts (3)	0–5	Llay Welfare (3)
Llansantffraid Village (3)	1–3	Builth Wells (3)
Chepstow Town (4)	6–0	Fairwater (8)
Cefn Mawr Rangers (4)	1–5	Coedpoeth United (4)
Abermule (4)	3–2	Rhayader Town (4)
Montgomery Town (3)	2–3	Machynlleth Town (4)
Mynydd Isa Spartans (4)	1–4	Brymbo (3)
Four Crosses (3)	5–0	Waterloo Rovers (4)
Brecon Corries (5)	2–0	Clwb Cymric (6)
Plas Madoc (3)	1–2	New Brighton Villa (4)
Borth United (4)	2–0	Presteigne St. Andrews (4)
Merthyr Saints (5)	2–2 aet (6–5 pens)	Treowen Stars (4)
Dolgellau Athletic Amateur (4)	5–2	Churchstoke (4)
Newcastle Emlyn (5)	1–4	Glynneath Town (5)
Cornelly United (6)	3–2	Trebanog (5)
Rogerstone (6)	1–5	Sully Sports (5)
Prestatyn Sports (3)	2–0	Pentraeth (4)
Caerau (4)	3–3 aet (9–10 pens)	Pontyclun (4)
Baglan Dragons (5)	1–2	Penrhiwceiber Constitutional Athletic (7)
Wattsville (5)	6–1	Cardiff Corinthians (6)
Newport Civil Service (5)	9–1	Pontlottyn (5)
Amlwch Town (4)	0–6	Llandudno Amateurs (5)
Penlan (5)	8–2	Ferndale BC (9)
Pencoed Athletic Boys and Girls Club (5)	3–0	AFC Porth (4)
Trethomas Bluebirds (3)	3–1 (a.e.t.)	St. Albans (7)
Bodedern Athletic (3)	1–2	Aberffraw (4)
Porthcawl Town Athletic (6)	0–4	Trefelin BGC (4)
Newport City (3)	5–0	Brecon Northcote (4)
Ynysygerwn (4)	2–3	Cefn Cribwr (5)

== Second qualifying round ==
Team 1	Score	Team 2
Saturday 29 September
Llanuwchllyn (3)	1–4	Hawarden Rangers (4)
Caerau (Ely) (2)	2–1	Trethomas Bluebirds (3)
Prestatyn Sports (3)	3–4 (a.e.t.)	Pwllheli (4)
Penmaenmawr Phoenix (4)	3–3 aet (2–4 pens)	New Brighton Villa (4)
Aber Valley (6)	1–2	Trefelin BGC (4)
Llangefni Town (3)	4–0	Saltney Town (3)
Aberbargoed Buds (4)	1–1 aet (5–3 pens)	Bridgend Street (3)
St Asaph City (3)	3–1	Barmouth & Dyffryn United (4)
Lex XI (4)	0–4	Corwen (3)
Caldicot Town (3)	2–0	Merthyr Saints (5)
Mold Alexandra (3)	2–0 (a.e.t.)	Chirk Amateur Athletic Association (3)
Monmouth Town (3)	4–2	Wattsville (5)
West End (3)	5–2	Aberdare Town (3)
Dyffryn Nantlle Vale (3)	2–2 aet (5–4 pens)	Mynydd Llandegai (3)
Dinas Powys (3)	2–2 aet (4–3 pens)	Pill YMCA (5)
Pontardawe Town (3)	2–2 aet (3–4 pens)	Penlan (5)
Llandyrnog United (3)	2–2 aet (2–3 pens)	Rhydymwyn (3)
Penydarren BGC (4)	0–3	Garden Village (3)
Cardiff Draconians (5)	3–4 (a.e.t.)	Sully Sports (5)
Rhos Aelwyd (3)	3–4	Brymbo (3)
Newport City (3)	0–3	Pencoed Athletic Boys and Girls Club (5)
Risca United (3)	2–3	Treharris Athletic Western (4)
Llandudno Albion (3)	3–1	Llanrug United (3)
Brecon Corries (5)	2–0	Abermule (4)
Cefn Cribwr (5)	2–4 (a.e.t.)	Pontyclun (4)
Panteg (3)	3–2	Penrhiwceiber Constitutional Athletic (7)
Aberffraw (4)	0–0 aet (3–4 pens)	Rhostyllen (3)
Llandrindod Wells (3)	4–2	Four Crosses (3)
STM Sports (3)	12–0	Glynneath Town (5)
Penrhyndeudraeth (3)	1–4	Coedpoeth United (4)
Caersws (3)	8–0	Tywyn Bryncrug (3)
Cwmbrân Town (5)	2–0	Newport Civil Service (5)
Llanrwst United (3)	0–5	Brickfield Rangers (3)
Machynlleth Town (4)	1–2	Dolgellau Athletic Amateur (4)
Llwydcoed (3)	1–2	Blaenrhondda (4)
Llay Welfare (3)	3–0	Nomads of Connahs Quay (3)
Radnor Valley (3)	4–0	Carno (3)
Cornelly United (6)	4–3 (a.e.t.)	Chepstow Town (4)
Meliden (4)	1–2	Penycae (3)
Llanfair United (3)	5–2	Aberaeron (3)
Holyhead Town (4)	4–3	Llanberis (3)
Bow Street (3)	1–2	Borth United (4)
Greenfield (3)	2–5	Llandudno Amateurs (5)
Croesyceiliog (3)	2–4 (a.e.t.)	Ynysddu Welfare (5)
Welshpool Town (3)	3–3 aet (4–5 pens)	Llanidloes Town (3)
Cefn Albion] (3)	3–2	FC Queens Park (3)
Swansea University (3)	5–0	Abergavenny Town (3)
Berriew (3)	5–2 (a.e.t.)	Builth Wells (3)

== First round ==
Team 1	Score	Team 2
20 October
Llandudno Amateurs (5)	2–4	Dyffryn Nantlle Vale (3)
Llangefni Town (3)	2–0	Borth United (4)
Pontyclun (4)	3–1	Llantwit Major (2)
STM Sports (3)	1–2	Haverfordwest County (2)
Trefelin BGC (4)	1–2	Swansea University (3)
Ynysddu Welfare (5)	2–1	Taff's Well (2)
Llandrindod Wells (3)	1–1	Aberbargoed Buds (4)
Prestatyn Town (2)	5–1	New Brighton Villa (4)
Cambrian & Clydach (2)	5–0	Port Talbot Town (2)
Guilsfield (2)	2–0	Rhostyllen (3)
Radnor Valley (3)	1–2	Goytre (2)
Buckley Town (2)	3–1	Brymbo (3)
Llanrhaeadr (2)	1–2	Flint Town United (2)
Berriew (3)	1–1 aet (5–4 pens)	Penrhyncoch (2)
Coedpoeth United (4)	2–3	Ruthin Town (2)
Caersws (3)	3–2 (a.e.t.)	Holywell Town (2)
Pwllheli (4)	0–3	Porthmadog (2)
Llay Welfare (3)	2–0	Rhydymwyn (3)
Hawarden Rangers (4)	2–3	Llanfair United (3)
Denbigh Town (2)	9–3	Holyhead Town (4)
Sully Sports (5)	3–1	Brecon Corries (5)
Llanidloes Town (3)	1–2	Pontypridd Town (2)
Treharris Athletic Western (4)	3–2	Cornelly United (6)
Undy Athletic (2)	3–4	Monmouth Town (3)
Cwmbrân Town (5)	3–2	Afan Lido (2)
Ton Pentre (2)	3–1	Pencoed Athletic (5)
Holyhead Hotspur (3)	4–2	Corwen (3)
Cwmamman United (2)	4-0	Dinas Powys (3)
Penycae (3)	0–4	Airbus UK Broughton (2)
West End (3)	0–6	Caldicot Town (3)
Bangor City (2)	4-2	Mold Alexandra (3)
Garden Village (3)	1–2	Blaenrhondda (5)
Panteg (3)	1–3	Pen-y-Bont (2)
Conwy Borough (2)	1–2	Rhyl (2)
Cwmbran Celtic (2)	3-0	Ammanford (2)
Gresford Athletic (2)	4-3 (a.e.t.)	Brickfield Rangers (3)
Briton Ferry Llansawel (2)	1-0	Caerau (Ely) (2)
Llandudno Albion (3)	3–4	St Asaph City (3)
Penlan Club (5)	0–1	Goytre United (2)
Cefn Albion (3)	7-1	Dolgellau Athletic (4)

== Second round ==
Team 1	Score	Team 2
17 November
Aberbargoed Buds (4)	0–2	Pen-y-Bont (2)
Cwmmamman United (2)	2–1	Blaenrhondda (5)
Buckley Town (2)	1–3	Denbigh Town (2)
Flint Town United (2)	3–2	Gresford Athletic (2)
Guilsfield (2)	4–3	Nantlle Vale (3)
Holyhead Hotspur (3)	3–1	Ruthin Town (2)
Llangefni Town (3)	5–1	St. Asaph City (3)
Prestatyn Town (2)	6–3	Berriew (3)
Rhyl (2)	3–1	Caersws (3)
Goytre United (2)	1–0	Pontyclun (4)
Haverfordwest County (2)	4–3	Swansea University (3)
Airbus UK Broughton (2)	9–1	Llay Welfare (3)
Bangor City (2)	6–1	Cefn Albion (3)
Pontypridd Town (2)	6–3	Goytre (2)
Treharris Athletic Western (3)	3–4	Briton Ferry Llansawel (2)
Sully Sports (5)	1–3	Cwmbran Celtic (2)
Llanfair United (2)	1–4	Porthmadog (2)
Cwmbrân Town (5)	1–2	Ton Pentre (2)
Monmouth Town (2)	1–3	Ynysddu Welfare (5)
Caldicot Town (3)	2–3	Cambrian & Clydach (2)

== Third round ==
Team 1	Score	Team 2
26 January
Prestatyn Town (2)	0–3	Caernarfon Town (1)
Barry Town (1)	4–1	Pen-y-Bont (2)
Bangor City (2)	4–1	Holyhead (2)
Cwmbran Celtic (2)	0–3	The New Saints (1)
Cwmamman United (2)	3–4	Aberystwyth Town (1)
Newtown (1)	1–2	Rhyl (2)
Llangefni Town (3)	1–0	Llanelli Town (1)
Ynysddu Welfare (5)	1–3	Cefn Druids (1)
Goytre United (2)	0–3	Carmarthen Town (1)
Ton Pentre (2)	1–4	Cardiff Metropolitan University (1)
Haverfordwest County (2)	3–0	Pontypridd Town (2)
Airbus UK Broughton (2)	1–1 aet (4–2 pens)	Porthmadog (2)
Denbigh Town (2)	1–2	Cambrian & Clydach (2)
Guilsfield (2)	2–4	Connah's Quay Nomads (1)
Briton Ferry (2)	2–3	Llandudno Town (1)
Flint Town United (2)	0–3	Bala Town (1)

== Fourth round ==
Team 1	Score	Team 2
26 January
Carmarthen Town (1)	1–3	Connah's Quay Nomads (1)
Haverfordwest County (2)	0–0 (0–4 aet)	Bala Town (1)
Bangor City (2)	1–2	Caernarfon Town (1)
Barry Town United (1)	3–2	Cefn Druids (1)
Airbus UK Broughton (2)	2–5	The New Saints (1)
Cambrian & Clydach Vale (2)	1–1 aet (5–4 pens)	Rhyl (2)
Aberystwyth Town (1)	1–3	Cardiff Metropolitan University (1)
Llangefni Town (3)	1–3	Llandudno (1)

== Quarter-finals ==
Team 1	Score	Team 2
1 March
Caernarfon Town (1)	1–2	Connah's Quay Nomads (1)
2 March
Barry Town United (1)	3–2	Cambrian & Clydach Vale (2)
Bala Town (1)	0–1	Cardiff Metropolitan University (1)
Llandudno (1)	1–8	The New Saints (1)

== Semi-finals ==
Team 1	Score	Team 2
30 March
The New Saints (1)	2–0	Barry Town United (1)
31 March
Cardiff Metropolitan University (1)	0–3	Connah's Quay Nomads (1)

== Final ==
Team 1	Score	Team 2
5 May
Connah's Quay Nomads (1)	0–3	The New Saints (1)
