= 2015–16 Welsh Cup =

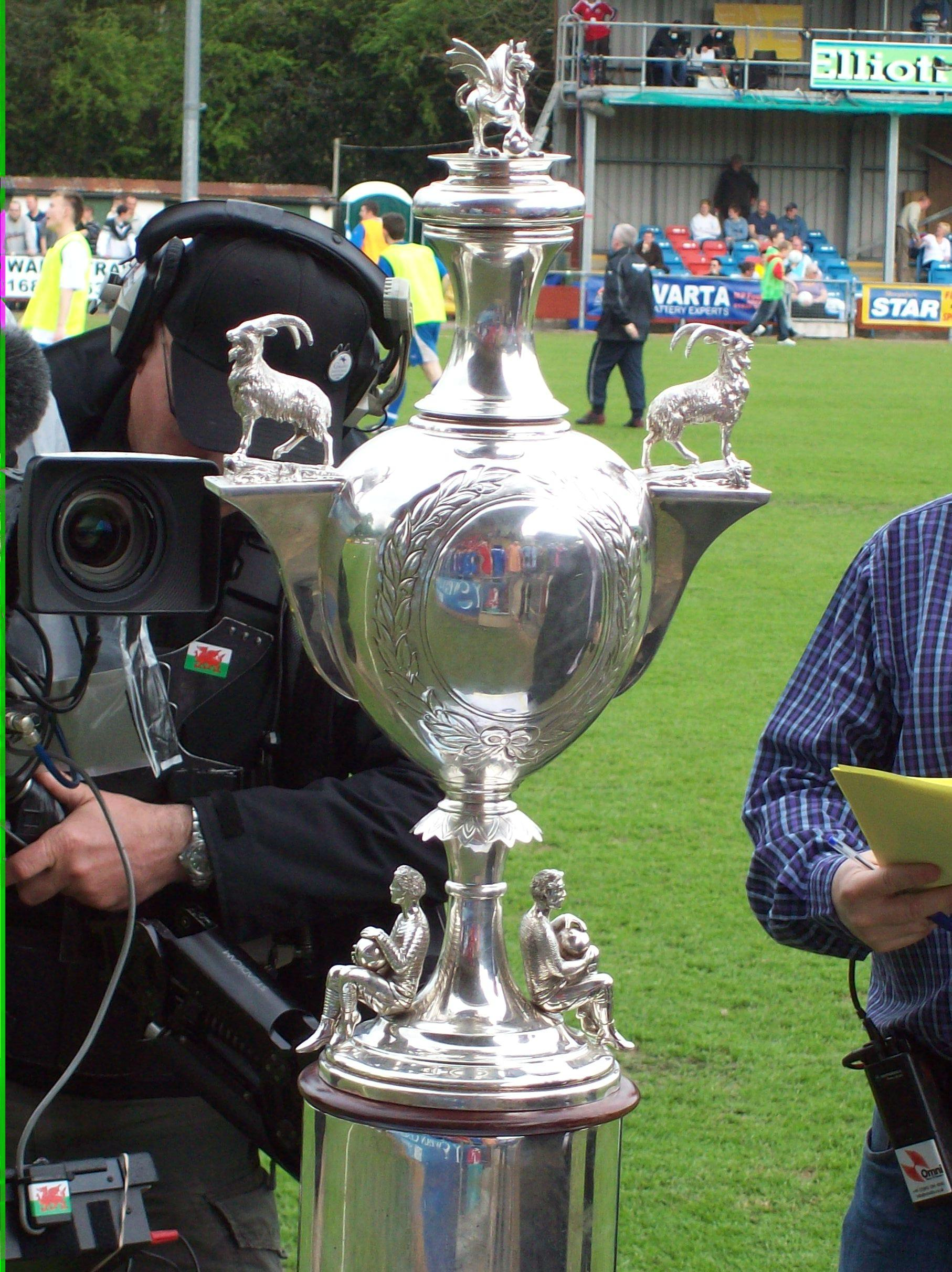
- The Welsh Cup

Tournament details
- Country: Wales

Final positions
- Champions: The New Saints
- Runners-up: Airbus UK Broughton

The 2015–16 FAW Welsh Cup is the 129th season of the annual knockout tournament for competitive football teams in Wales. The defending champions are The New Saints, having defeated Newtown 2–0 in the previous year's competition. The total prize money for 2015–16 was set at £158,000.

Both qualifying rounds and the first two rounds proper were regionalised, thereafter the draws were made nationwide.

== First qualifying round ==
=== Northern Region ===
Team 1	Score	Team 2
Aberffraw	4-1	Gaerwen
Amlwch Town	3-2 (a.e.t.)	Meliden
Aston Park Rangers	2-4	Llandyrnog United
Blaenau Ffestiniog	0-6	Prestatyn Sports
Brymbo	4-1	Halkyn United
Caerwys	1-3	Castell Alun Colts
Cefn Albion	5-2	CPD Llanuwchllyn
CPD Sychdyn	2-1	Argoed United
Ewloe Spartans	2-3	Lex Glyndwr
Greenfield	2-1	Overton Recreational
Llanerchymedd	8-0	Talysarn Celts
Llanfairpwll	2-4	Llanberis
Llangefni Town	3-0	Mynydd Llandegai
Llangollen Town	9-1	Llay Miners Welfare
Llanystumdwy	0-1	Dyffryn Nantlle Vale
Mochdre Sports	3-2	Llanllyfni
Penley	4-3	Brickfield Rangers
Penmaenmawr Phoenix	3-1	Pwllheli
Pentraeth	7-1	Menai Bridge Tigers
Penyffordd	8-0	Coedpoeth United
Rhostyllen	6-0	AFC Brynford
Saltney Town	1-4	FC Queens Park
St Asaph City F.C.	0-2	Llanrwst United
Trearddur Bay United	5-2	Glan Conwy

=== Central Region ===
Team 1	Score	Team 2
Aberaeron	6-1	Abermule
Berriew	11-2	Newbridge on Wye
Hay St Mary's	2-2 (a.e.t.); 5-4 (pens)	Llansantffraid Village
Knighton Town	4-0	Kerry
Llanfyllin Town	2-4	Machynlleth
Montgomery Town	3-0	Bont
Presteigne St. Andrews	2-4	Tywyn Bryncrug
Welshpool Town	5-4	Borth United

=== Southern Region ===
Team 1	Score	Team 2
AFC Butetown	4-1	Blaenrhondda
AFC Perthcelyn	1-2	Llantwit Fardre
Bettws	6-2	Newcastle Emlyn
Brecon Corinthians	3-0	Penrhiwfer
Bridgend Street	2-3	Cardiff Corinthians
Canton Liberal	1-2	Pontypridd Town
Cardiff Hibernians	3-5	Treharris Athletic Western
Carnetown	1-7	Pontyclun
Cornelly United	2-4	Penlan
Cwmbach Royal Stars	2-0	Ely Rangers
FC Tredegar	4-4 (a.e.t.); 1-4 (pens)	Dynamo Aber
Garw	3-0	Ynysygerwn
Graig	2-4	Cwm Welfare
Llangynwyd Rangers	4-2	Trefelin BGC
Llantwit Major	5-0	Cefn Cribwr Boys Club
Lliswerry	1-1 (a.e.t.); 3-4 (pens)	Newport Civil Service
Merthyr Saints	5-2	Cogan Coronation
Panteg	2-1	Newport YMCA
Penrhiwceiber Constitutional Athletic	2-1	Clwb Cymric
Porthcawl Town Athletic	3-1	Caerau
RTB Ebbw Vale	6-2	Aberfan
STM Sports	6-0	West of St Julians
Sully Sports	3-0	Treforest
Tredegar Town	0-2	Caerleon
Treowen Stars	3-2	Aber Valley YMCA
Trethomas Bluebirds	2-3 (a.e.t.)	Cwmbran Town
Ynysddu Welfare	4-0	Machen

== Quarter-final ==
Prior the quarter finals there were two qualifying rounds and four rounds proper. Quarter final matches were played on Saturday 5 March 2016.

Team 1	Score	Team 2
Airbus UK Broughton (1)	3-0	Bala Town (1)
Cardiff Metropolitan University (2)	0-2	Connah's Quay Nomads (1)
Cwmbran Celtic (3)	1-2	Port Talbot Town (1)
The New Saints (1)	1-0	Newtown (1)

== Semi-final ==
Semi-final matches are to be played on Saturday 2 April 2016, both at Latham Park, Newtown, Powys.

Team 1	Score	Team 2
Port Talbot Town (1)	0–7	Airbus UK Broughton (1)
The New Saints (1)	5–0	Connah's Quay Nomads (1)

== Final ==
2 May 2016
16:15

The New Saints (1)	2–0	Airbus UK Broughton (1)
Brobbel 33'; Quigley 51'	Report

Racecourse Ground, Wrexham
