= 2011–12 Welsh Football League Division Two =

MacWhirter Welsh League Division Two
- Season: 2011–12
- Champions: Monmouth Town
- Promoted: Caerleon; Monmouth Town; Tata Steel
- Relegated: Bettws; Newcastle Emlyn; Treharris Athletic Western
- Matches played: 240
- Goals scored: 850 (3.54 per match)
- Biggest home win: Monmouth Town 8–2 Caldicot Town; 31 August 2011; Aberbargoed Buds 7–1 Treharris Athletic Western; 15 October 2011; Monmouth Town 6–0 Caerau; 15 October 2011; Tata Steel 6–0 Treharris Athletic Western; 28 January 2012; Caerleon 6–0 Caerau; 24 March 2012; Monmouth Town 6–0 Bettws; 25 March 2012
- Biggest away win: Treharris Athletic Western 1–8 Monmouth Town; 5 November 2011
- Highest scoring: Monmouth Town 8–2 Caldicot Town; 31 August 2011; Treharris Athletic Western 6–4 Caerleon; 26 November 2011

The 2011–12 Welsh Football League Division Two began on 13 August 2011 and ended on 12 May 2012.

== Team changes from 2010–11 ==
AFC Porth, Cwmaman Institute and Ton Pentre were promoted to the Welsh Football League Division One.

Caldicot Town, Garden Village, Penrhiwceiber Rangers were relegated from the Welsh Football League Division One.

AFC Llwydcoed, Abertillery Bluebirds and Llangeinor were relegated to the Welsh Football League Division Three.

Caerau, Monmouth Town and Tata Steel were promoted from the Welsh Football League Division Three.

== League table ==
Pos	Team	Pld	W	D	L	GF	GA	GD	Pts
1	Monmouth Town (C, P)	30	22	4	4	102	33	+69	70
2	Tata Steel (P)	30	23	1	6	80	36	+44	70
3	Caerleon (P)	30	18	8	4	68	25	+43	62
4	Newport YMCA	30	18	3	9	60	38	+22	57
5	Dinas Powys	30	17	5	8	54	35	+19	56
6	Penrhiwceiber Rangers	30	13	5	12	50	47	+3	44
7	Croesyceiliog	30	12	6	12	55	54	+1	42
8	Garden Village	30	11	8	11	57	50	+7	41
9	Caldicot Town	30	12	3	15	42	63	−21	39
10	Caerau	30	11	5	14	44	58	−14	35 (Note: Caerau deducted three points for failing to fulfil a fixture.)
11	Ely Rangers	30	9	7	14	51	62	−11	34
12	Ammanford	30	9	6	15	44	67	−23	33
13	Aberbargoed Buds	30	9	5	16	47	59	−12	32
14	Bettws (R)	30	7	4	19	31	65	−34	25
15	Newcastle Emlyn (R)	30	6	3	21	35	66	−31	21
16	Treharris Athletic Western (R)	30	4	5	21	30	92	−62	17

Updated to match(es) played on 12 May 2012. Source: Welsh Football League
Rules for classification: 1) points; 2) goal difference; 3) number of goals scored.
(C) Champions; (P) Promoted; (R) Relegated

== Results ==
Home \ Away	ABB	AMM	BET	CAE	CAR	CAL	CRO	DIN	ELY	GAR	MON	NEM	NEW	PNR	TAT	TAW
Aberbargoed Buds		2–2	1–2	2–1	1–5	2–0	2–5	0–2	1–1	1–2	1–2	4–0	0–4	1–0	3–5	7–1
Ammanford	1–1		2–1	2–1	0–2	2–3	3–2	1–2	2–3	4–2	1–4	4–3	0–3	2–2	1–4	3–2
Bettws	1–3	0–0		0–1	3–2	3–3	0–1	1–0	1–1	0–5	1–6	2–1	0–0	2–0	2–5	1–2
Caerau	2–1	2–0	2–1		1–1	0–2	4–3	1–2	1–2	1–1	1–1	3–1	0–2	2–1	0–2	6–1
Caerleon	0–0	0–0	2–1	6–0		3–0	2–1	4–0	4–0	1–0	3–0	1–0	0–1	0–0	0–0	2–1
Caldicot Town	2–1	2–3	1–0	2–1	0–5		1–3	0–1	1–2	1–0	2–4	1–0	0–1	0–5	2–3	2–0
Croesyceiliog	2–0	2–0	4–0	1–2	2–3	2–3		4–2	0–0	1–0	0–5	3–1	2–3	2–2	1–3	0–0
Dinas Powys	1–4	2–1	2–0	3–0	0–2	3–2	5–1		0–0	0–0	2–0	3–0	0–2	4–0	3–2	3–0
Ely Rangers	4–3	2–2	2–4	2–1	6–4	1–2	3–2	0–1		1–3	2–4	2–3	0–0	2–2	1–4	4–0
Garden Village	1–2	3–2	2–0	2–2	2–2	2–2	1–2	2–2	4–0		0–5	3–1	5–3	1–2	4–2	4–0
Monmouth Town	4–1	4–0	6–0	6–0	2–2	8–2	1–1	1–1	3–1	4–1		4–0	1–2	6–2	4–0	2–0
Newcastle Emlyn	1–2	4–0	2–1	1–3	0–2	2–2	1–1	3–2	3–2	1–1	2–3		2–4	0–1	0–2	2–0
Newport YMCA	2–1	2–0	4–0	3–0	2–4	1–3	1–2	0–0	2–1	2–3	0–2	4–1		2–1	1–2	3–0
Penrhiwceiber Rangers	1–0	2–3	2–1	2–0	1–1	3–0	1–2	2–1	1–0	2–1	0–2	1–0	3–4		0–3	3–1
Tata Steel	5–0	1–2	1–0	3–4	4–0	2–0	2–0	0–2	2–1	3–1	4–0	4–0	2–0	4–3		6–0
Treharris Athletic Western	0–0	4–1	2–3	2–2	0–5	0–1	3–3	2–5	2–5	1–1	1–8	1–0	3–2	0–5	1–3	

Updated to match(es) played on 12 May 2012. Source: Welsh Football League
Legend: Blue = home team win; Yellow = draw; Red = away team win.
