= Welsh Football League Cup =

Association football competition in Wales

Welsh Football League Challenge Cup
- Founded: 1925
- Abolished: 2020
- Last champions: Penydarren B.G.C.
- Most championships: Cardiff City Reserves (7 titles)
- Website: Official Welsh League website

The Welsh Football League Challenge Cup (known for a time as the Nathaniel Car Sales League Cup for sponsorship reasons, and not to be confused with the national Welsh League Cup) was a knock-out competition for all members of the divisions that make up the Welsh Football League in south Wales.

== Winners ==
Winners and runners-up of the Welsh Football League Cup
Season	Winner	Runner-up	Venue	Source
1925–26	Merthyr Town	Swansea Town	Swansea	
1926–27	Ebbw Vale	Aberdare	Ebbw Vale	
1927–28	Cardiff City reserves	Lovells Athletic	Swansea	
1928–29	Cardiff City reserves	Ebbw Vale	Ebbw Vale	
1929–30	Llanelli	Barry Town reserves	Llanelli	
1930–31	Swansea Town reserves	Llanelli	Llanelli	
1931–32	Llanelli A.F.C.	Troedyrhiw	Troedyrhiw	
1932–33	Swansea Town reserves	Newport County	Treorchy	
1933–34	Porth	Llanelli	Porth	
1934–35	Barry Town reserves	Gelli Colliery	Treorchy	
1935–36	Cardiff City reserves	Aberdare Town	Aberaman	
1936–37	Newport County	Milford	Haverfordwest	
1937–38	Cardiff City reserves	Tredomen	Nelson	
1938–39	Milford United	Aberaman	Milford	
1939–1946	The competition was suspended during World War II.			
1946–47	Barry Town	Milford United	Haverfordwest	
1947–48	Merthyr Tydfil	Newport County	Merthyr	
1948–49	Merthyr Tydfil	Llanelli	Swansea	
1949–50	Caerau Athletic	Milford United	Llanelli	
1950–51	Merthyr Tydfil reserves	Caerau Athletic	Merthyr	
1951–52	Abergavenny Thursdays	Caerau Athletic	Merthyr	
1952–53	Newport County reserves	Treharris Athletic	Aberystwyth	
1953–54	Pembroke Borough	Aberystwyth Town	Llanelli	
1954–55	Treharris Athletic	Milford United	Llanelli	
1955–56	Ebbw Vale	Newport County reserves	Abergavenny	
1956–57	Ebbw Vale	Milford United	Llanelli	
1957–58	Newport County reserves	Milford United	Llanelli	
1958–59	Pembroke Borough	Caerau Athletic	Port Talbot	
1959–60	Cardiff City reserves	Llanelli	Swansea	
1960–61	Haverfordwest	Llanelli	Llanelli	
1961–62	Merthyr Tydfil reserves	Pembroke Borough	Haverfordwest	
1962–63	Brecon Corinthians	Abergavenny Thursdays	Abergavenny	
1963–1972	Competition did not take place.			
1972–73	Cardiff City reserves	Newport County reserves	Cardiff	
1973–74	Cardiff City reserves	Ton Pentre	Caerau	
1974–75	Llanelli	Haverfordwest	Caerau	
1975–76	Cardiff Corinthians	Cardiff City reserves	Cardiff	
1976–77	Newport County reserves	Cardiff City reserves	Newport	
1977–78	Newport County reserves	Pontllanfraith	Ton Pentre	
1978–79	Barry Town	Pontllanfraith	Ton Pentre	
1979–80	Pontllanfraith	Newport County reserves	Ton Pentre	
1980–81	Merthyr Tydfil reserves	Sully	Ton Pentre	
1981–82	Brecon Corinthians	Trelewis	Merthyr	
1982–83	Barry Town	Merthyr Tydfil reserves	Bridgend	
1983–84	Lake United	Ammanford Town	Ton Pentre	
1984–85	Pontllanfraith	Haverfordwest	Caerau	
1985–86	Pembroke Borough	Cwmbrân Town	Merthyr	
1986–87	Barry Town	AFC Cardiff	Maesteg	
1987–88	Bridgend Town	Barry Town	Ton Pentre	
1988–89	Haverfordwest County	Barry Town	Ebbw Vale	
1989–90	Blaenrhondda	Llanelli	Ton Pentre	
1990–91	Cwmbrân Town	Pembroke Borough	Llanelli	
1991–92	Brecon Corinthians	Pembroke Borough	Llanelli	
1992–93	Pembroke Borough	Penrhiwceiber	Bridgend	
1993–94	Barry Town	Treowen Stars	Bridgend	
1994–95	Grange Harlequins	Briton Ferry	Bridgend	
1995–96	Carmarthen Town	Maesteg Park	Bridgend	
1996–97	UWIC	Haverfordwest County	Afan Lido	
1997–98	Treowen Stars	BP (Llandarcy)	Bridgend	
1998–99	Ton Pentre	Bridgend Town	Afan Lido	
1999–2000	Port Talbot Town	Cardiff Civil Service	Bridgend	
2000–01	Ton Pentre	Fields Park/Pontllanfraith	Neath	
2001–02	Llanwern	Gwynfi United	Neath	
2002–03	Neath	Bettws	Ton Pentre	
2003–04	Briton Ferry	Llanelli	Ton Pentre	
2004–05	Goytre United	Pontardawe Town	Ton Pentre	
2005–06	Penrhiwceiber	Pontardawe Town	Afan Lido	
2006–07	Afan Lido	Goytre United	Port Talbot	
2007–08	Goytre United	Bryntirion Athletic	Afan Lido	
2008–09	Afan Lido	Penrhiwceiber	Maesteg	
2009–10	Croesyceiliog	Goytre United	Bridgend	
2010–11	Goytre	Aberbargoed Buds	Bryntirion	
2011–12	Taff's Well	Cambrian & Clydach Vale BGC	Ton Pentre	
2012–13	Taff's Well	Bryntirion Athletic	Ton Pentre	
2013–14	AFC Porth	Pontardawe Town	Port Talbot	
2014–15	Taff's Well	Caerau (Ely)	Barry	
2015–16	Taff's Well	Briton Ferry Llansawel	Afan Lido	
2016–17	Llanelli Town	Bridgend Street	Briton Ferry	
2017–18	Trefelin BGC	Llanelli Town	Garden Village, Swansea	
2018–19	Penydarren BGC	Ynysygerwn	Port Talbot Town	

== Titles per club ==
Wins	Clubs
7	Cardiff City Reserves
5	Merthyr Tydfil Reserves, Newport County Reserves
4	Pembroke Borough, Taff's Well, Llanelli (Llanelly)
3	Barry Town Reserves, Barry Town, Brecon Corinthians, Ebbw Vale
2	Afan Lido, Goytre United, Haverfordwest County, Pontllanfraith, Swansea Town Reserves, Ton Pentre, AFC Porth
1	Abergavenny Thursdays, Blaenrhondda, Bridgend Town, Briton Ferry, Caerau Athletic, Cardiff Corinthians, Carmarthen Town, Croesyceiliog, Cwmbran Town, Grange Harlequins, Inter CableTel, Lake United, Llanwern, Merthyr Town Reserves, Milford, Neath, Penrhiwceiber Rangers, Port Talbot Athletic, Trefelin BGC, Treharris Athletic, Treowen Stars, Penydarren BGC

== See also ==
- Football in Wales
- Welsh football league system
- Welsh Cup
- Welsh League Cup
- FAW Premier Cup
- List of football clubs in Wales
- List of stadiums in Wales by capacity
