= Kenfig Hill A.F.C. =

Football club based in Wales

Kenfig Hill
- Full name: Kenfig Hill Association Football Club
- Nickname: The Riversiders
- Founded: early 1900s reformed 1934
- Ground: Croft Goch
- League: Port Talbot Football League
- 2024–25: Port Talbot Football League First Division, 4th of 8
Home colours	Away colours

Kenfig Hill Association Football Club is a Welsh football club based in Kenfig Hill. They were founded in the early 1900s, and played in the South Wales Amateur League from 1956 to 2015. They currently play in the Port Talbot Football League.

== History ==
The club has existed since the early 1900s. They won the Llanharan League in 1919–20 and were runners-up in the following season, when the reserves won the Second Division of the league. In 1924 the club joined the Welsh Football League. In November 1926 they withdrew from both the Welsh League and Llanharan League, folding both the first and second team. By 1927 they were back in the Llanharan League, and apparently "ought to climb into a higher class next year". In January 1928 it was said that the committee would not carry on unless better support can be received from the players. In 1929 the club joined the Bridgend & District League, out of debt due to organising "everything possible" to help the club. This club was still active in February 1932, but by August 1932 it was described as "impossible" to revive the club. In 1933 a meeting was called to reform the club and in 1934 a new club was formed in Kenfig Hill. They joined the Port Talbot Football League when it reformed in 1946 after World War II. In 1954 they moved to the Central Athletic Ground and in 1956 they were accepted into the South Wales Amateur League.

In the 1968–69 season they won the South Wales Amateur League Division Two, having led for most of the season. Wins over Maerdy, Aber Valley, Bryntirion, and a draw with Ynysddu secured the title.

In the 1988–89 season they won the South Wales Amateur League Division Two by 11 points, and the reserves gained promotion to the Port Talbot League Premier Division.

The club formed an under-18 team in October 1994. In March 1995 this team received a one-off start-up grant of £50 from Ogwr Borough Council.

Kenfig Hill were again Division Two champions in 1999–2000, gaining promotion to Division One. They were relegated in 2002 but returned after one season back in Division Two, and won the Division One title in their first season after promotion. They were again relegated in 2006, and were promoted after finishing third in Division Two in 2009. In 2010–11 the team won its second Division One title. Poor seasons followed, and the team was relegated in 2014, before leaving the South Wales Amateur League entirely in 2015. They now play in the Port Talbot League.

== Honours ==
- South Wales Amateur League Division One - Champions: 2003–04, 2010–11
- South Wales Amateur League Division Two - Champions: 1968–69, 1988–89, 1999–2000
- Llanharan League First Division - Champions: 1919–20
- Llanharan League Second Division - Champions: 1920–21 (reserves)
