= Paul Giles =

Welsh footballer and manager (born 1961)

Personal information
- Full name: Paul Anthony Giles
- Date of birth: 22 February 1961 (age 65)
- Place of birth: Cardiff, Wales
- Positions: Forward; left midfielder

Youth career
- Cardiff City

Senior career*
Years	Team	Apps	(Gls)
1980–1983	Cardiff City	24	(1)
1981–1982	→ Exeter City (loan)	9	(1)
1983–1984	Excelsior Rotterdam	5	(0)
1984	SVV	3	(1)
1985–1986	Newport County	1	(0)
1985–1986	Merthyr Tydfil		
1986–1988	Newport County	29	(2)
1988–?	Merthyr Tydfil		
1993–1994	Inter Cardiff	33	(9)
1994–1996	Barry Town	66	(12)
1996–1998	Ebbw Vale	72	(19)
1998–1999	Cwmbran Town	4	(1)
1998–1999	Inter Cabletel	9	(3)
2000	Inter Cardiff	10	(0)
2004–2005	Grange Quins	1	(0)

Managerial career
- 1995–1996: Barry Town
- 1996–1998: Ebbw Vale
- 2000: Inter Cardiff
- 2002–2003: Dinas Powys
- 2004–2005: Grange Quins
- 2012–?: Rhoose
- 2016–2017: Dinas Powys
- * Club domestic league appearances and goals

Paul Anthony Giles (born 21 February 1961) is a Welsh former professional footballer and manager. He started his career with his hometown side Cardiff City after joining the club at the age of seven. He made his professional debut at the age of 19 in 1980 and went on to make over 25 appearances for the club in all competitions before being released in 1983 following a brief loan spell at Exeter City. He spent time playing in Holland for Excelsior Rotterdam and SVV before returning to Wales with Newport County and Merthyr Tydfil.

He was appointed player-manager of League of Wales side Barry Town in 1995 and led the side to their first title in 1996. He has also managed several other Welsh clubs including Ebbw Vale, Inter Cardiff and Dinas Powys on two occasions.

== Early life ==
Giles was born in Cardiff to Alan and Maureen Giles. He grew up on Virgil Street in the Grangetown area of the city and attended Courtmead Junior School before moving up to Fitzalan High School.

== Playing career ==
Giles' older brother David was also a footballer and joined the youth system at their hometown club Cardiff City. After signing as an apprentice, David was offered the chance to bring a friend along with him and he decided to take his younger brother. Despite being only seven years old, Paul impressed enough to be offered a place on the club's youth side. He also continued to play school's football in Division Two West of the Cardiff Schools Trophy and the Stanbury Cup. After twelve years at the club, Giles was handed a senior contract in June 1979 and made his professional debut at the age of 19 on 15 November 1980 in a 3–2 victory over Blackburn Rovers. He scored his first senior goal two months later in a 2–2 draw with Luton Town.

On 9 March 1982, Cardiff played a league match against Crystal Palace where Giles' brother David started in the opposition line-up. Having created several chances for Cardiff during the first-half, Palace manager Alan Mullery tasked Billy Gilbert with stopping Giles only for David to offer to take the role. During the second half, as Giles ran at the opposition defence, his brother David fouled him which resulted in Giles suffering damaged ankle ligaments that caused him to be taken off and left him injured for over a month. He later joined Exeter City on loan at the end of the 1982–83 season, making nine appearances and scoring one goal during a 3–0 victory over Chester City. He was released by Cardiff at the end of the season.

Following his release, Giles moved to Holland, spending brief periods with Excelsior Rotterdam and SVV. He returned to Wales in 1985 and played for both Newport County and Merthyr Tydfil on two occasions before playing for several teams in the Welsh Premier League.

== Management ==
In 1995, Giles was appointed player-manager of Welsh Premier League side Barry Town, guiding them to their first league title in 1996 and being named Welsh Premier League Manager of the Season. He moved to Ebbw Vale the following season, helping the side qualify for European competition for two consecutive seasons, and later managed Inter Cardiff after manager George Wood joined the coaching staff at Cardiff City. Taking a joint managerial role with his brother David, he led the side to nine victories in their final ten matches.

Giles had a spell as manager of Division Three Dinas Powys and led them to promotion to Division Two. In 2003 with Dinas already confirmed as champions of the division and guaranteed promotion to Division One he resigned, one week after chairman Paul Marks did likewise. Giles later commented that he was "gutted" but had to "stand by the chairman".

Giles was appointed manager of Cardiff Grange Quins in 2004. He led the club to the Welsh Premier League in his first season but resigned three months into the following season as the club had begun experiencing financial difficulties after their main sponsor removed backing and chairman David Pinches described Giles as being "mentally and emotionally drained". He took over as manager of South Wales Amateur League side Rhoose in 2012, winning promotion into the Welsh Football League and returned for a second spell with Dinas Powys between 2016 and 2017.

== Honours ==
Player-manager

Barry Town

- League of Wales winner: 1995–96

Individual

- League of Wales Manager of the Season: 1995–96
