= South Wales Amateur League =

- Founded: 1946
- Folded: 2015
- Country: Wales
- Number of clubs: 32 (16 in each division)
- Level on pyramid: 5 and 6
- Promotion to: Welsh Football League Division Three
- Domestic cup: South Wales Amateur Football League Challenge Cup
- Most championships: Taff's Well (5 titles)

The South Wales Amateur League was a former football league in South Wales. The league consisted of two divisions, named Divisions One and Two. Division One was a feeder to the Welsh Football League Division Three, and sat at level 5 of the Welsh football pyramid.

== History ==
The league began in the 1946–47 season as the South Wales Corinthian League acting to bridge the gap between local football leagues and the Welsh Football League. Eleven clubs entered the inaugural championship with Dinas Corries claiming the first title.

The league was merged with South Wales Senior League in the 2015–16 season to form South Wales Alliance League.

== Member Clubs in the final 2014-15 season ==
=== Division 1 ===
- Aber Valley YMCA
- Baglan Dragons
- Caerau Link
- Hirwaun Welfare/Mackworth
- Llangynwyd Rangers
- Llantwit Fardre
- Merthyr Saints
- Pencoed Athletic
- Pontyclun
- STM Sports
- Ton & Gelli
- Trefelin
- Treforest
- Trelewis Welfare (withdrew mid-season)

=== Division 2 ===
- Aberfan SDC
- AFC Bargoed
- Brynna
- Canton Liberal
- Cardiff Draconians
- Cardiff Hibernian
- Clwb Cymric
- Dynamo Aber
- Graig
- Kenfig Hill
- Llanharry
- Rhydyfelin
- Splott Albion

== Divisional Champions ==
=== 1940s ===
Season	Division One	Division Two
1946–47	Dinas Corries	n/a
1947–48	Lysaghts	n/a
1948–49	Porth Welfare	Tonyrefail Welfare
1949–50	Porth Welfare	Abercwmboi Athletic

=== 1950s ===
Season	Division One	Division Two
1950–51	Tonyrefail Welfare	Fochriw
1951–52	Wattstown BC	Ynysybwl
1952–53	Taff's Well	Llanharan
1953–54	Taff's Well	Davies Athletic (Merthyr)
1954–55	Taff's Well	Teddington
1955–56	Teddington	Gilfach Goch
1956–57	Guest Keen	Ystrad Athletic
1957–58	Penarth Town	Cwmbach Sports
1958–59	Cwmbach Sports	Pontlottyn United
1959–60	Cwmbach Sports	Cwm Welfare

=== 1960s ===
Season	Division One	Division Two
1960–61	Cwmbach Sports	Llanharan
1961–62	Guest Keen	Bridgend Town
1962–63	Cwmbach Sports	Caerau Rangers
1963–64	Guest Keen	Bridgend Town
1964–65	Pyrene	Beatus United
1965–66	Beatus United	Cardiff Cosmos
1966–67	Bridgend Town	Taff's Well
1967–68	Guest Keen	Cadoxton Albion
1968–69	Bridgend Town	Kenfig Hill
1969–70	Ynyshir United	Dare Inglis

=== 1970s ===
Season	Division One	Division Two
1970–71	Pontllanfraith	Aber Valley
1971–72	Pontllanfraith	Cardiff Corinthians
1972–73	Hoover Sports	Cambrian United
1973-74	Ton & Gelli	Barry Plastics
1974-75	Taff's Well	Lake United
1975-76	Taff's Well	Caerau Rangers
1976-77	Taff's Well	Llantwit Fardre
1977-78	Ton & Gelli	Cardiff Cosmos
1978-79	Caerau Rangers	British Steel
1979-80	Llantwit Major	Maerdy

=== 1980s ===
Season	Division One	Division Two
1980-81	Llantwit Major	Bryntirion Athletic
1981-82	Hirwaun Welfare	Pencoed Athletic
1982-83	Llantwit Fardre	Porthcawl Town
1983-84	Llantwit Major	FC Cwmaman
1984-85	AFC Cardiff	Gwynfi United
1985-86	AFC Cardiff	British Steel (Port Talbot)
1986-87	AFC Cardiff	Cardiff Cosmos
1987-88	British Steel (Port Talbot)	Ynysddu Welfare
1988-89	British Steel (Port Talbot)	Kenfig Hill
1989-90	Porthcawl Town	AFC Porth

=== 1990s ===
Season	Division One	Division Two
1990-91	Hoover Sports	Llangeinor
1991-92	Penrhiwceiber Rangers	Cambrian United
1992-93	Llangeinor	Pencoed Athletic
1993-94	British Steel (Port Talbot)	Red Dragon
1994-95	Hoover Sports	Gwynfi United
1995-96	Gwynfi United	Trefelin BGC
1996-97	Ely Rangers	Cardiff Corinthians reserves
1997-98	Dinas Powys	Troedyrhiw
1998-99	Dinas Powys	Llantwit Major
1999-00	Dinas Powys	Kenfig Hill

=== 2000s ===
Season	Division One	Division Two
2000-01	Troedyrhiw	Cardiff Corinthians reserves
2001-02	Bryntirion Athletic	Ynysddu Welfare
2002-03	Llantwit Fardre	Red Dragon & Baglan
2003-04	Kenfig Hill	AFC Bargoed
2004-05	Cambrian & Clydach Vale BGC	Aber Valley YMCA
2005-06	Llangeinor	Rhydyfelin
2006-07	Cwmaman Institute	Trefelin BGC
2007-08	AFC Porth	Rhoose
2008-09	Corus Steel	Cardiff Draconians
2009-10	Caerau	Ton & Gelli

=== 2010s ===
Season	Division One	Division Two
2010-11	Kenfig Hill	STM Sports
2011-12	Llantwit Major	Perthcelyn United
2012-13	Rhoose	Merthyr Saints
2013-14	Trefelin BGC	Llangynwyd Rangers
2014-15	STM Sports	Canton Liberal

=== Divisional Champions - by number of titles ===
- Taff's Well – 6 titles
- British Steel (Port Talbot)/ Corus Steel – 4 titles
- Cwmbach Sports – 4 titles
- Guest Keen – 4 titles
- Llantwit Major – 4 titles
- AFC Cardiff – 3 titles
- Dinas Powys – 3 titles
- Hoover Sports – 3 titles
- Beatus United/ AFC Porth – 2 titles
- Bridgend Town – 2 tiles
- Caerau Rangers/ Caerau – 2 titles
- Kenfig Hill – 2 titles
- Llangeinor – 2 titles
- Llantwit Fardre – 2 titles
- Pontllanfraith – 2 titles
- Porth Welfare – 2 titles
- Ton & Gelli– 2 titles
- Bryntirion Athletic – 1 title
- Cambrian & Clydach Vale BGC – 1 title
- Cwmaman Institute – 1 title
- Dinas Corries – 1 title
- Ely Rangers – 1 title
- Fleur De Lys Welfare – 1 title
- Gwynfi United – 1 title
- Hirwaun Welfare – 1 title
- Lysaghts – 1 title
- Penarth Town – 1 title
- Penrhiwceiber Rangers reserves – 1 title
- Porthcawl Town – 1 title
- Pyrene – 1 title
- Rhoose – 1 title
- STM Sports – 1 title
- Teddington – 1 title
- Tonyrefail Welfare – 1 title
- Trefelin BGC – 1 title
- Troedyrhiw – 1 title
- Wattstown BC – 1 title
- Ynyshir United – 1 title
