= Fields Park Pontllanfraith A.F.C. =

Former association football club in Wales

Fields Park Pontllanfraith Association Football Club
- Full name: Fields Park Pontllanfraith Association Football Club
- Founded: 1992
- Dissolved: 2005

Fields Park Pontllanfraith A.F.C. were a Welsh football club who played in Welsh Football League and were formed in 1992 after a merger between Fields Park and Pontllanfraith. The club played for 13 seasons in the Welsh Football League until 2005, when it folded.

== Honours ==
- Welsh Football League Division Two (Fourth Tier of the Welsh Football Pyramid) – Champions: 1999–2000
- Welsh Football League Cup – Runners-Up: 2000–01

== Welsh Football League history ==
Information sourced from the Football Club History Database for Fields Park Pontllanfraith and the Welsh Soccer Archive.

Season	Pyramid Tier	League	Final position
1992–93	3	Welsh Football League Division Two	11th
1993–94	3	Welsh Football League Division Two	6th
1994–95	3	Welsh Football League Division Two	12th
1995–96	3	Welsh Football League Division Two	12th
1996–97	3	Welsh Football League Division Two	16th (relegated)
1997–98	4	Welsh Football League Division Three	4th
1998–99	4	Welsh Football League Division Three	3rd (promoted)
1999–2000	3	Welsh Football League Division Two	1st – Champions (promoted)
2000–01	2	Welsh Football League Division One	3rd
2001–02	2	Welsh Football League Division One	16th (relegated)
2002–03	3	Welsh Football League Division Two	18th (relegated)
2003–04	4	Welsh Football League Division Three	14th
2004–05	4	Welsh Football League Division Three	18th (relegated)
