= 1980–81 FA Trophy =

FA Challenge Trophy

Tournament details
- Country: England; Wales
- Teams: 230

Final positions
- Champions: Bishop's Stortford
- Runners-up: Sutton United

The 1980–81 FA Trophy was the twelfth season of the FA Trophy.

== Preliminary round ==
=== Ties ===
Tie	Home team	Score	Away team
1	Alfreton Town	2–0	Sutton Town
2	Aveley	5–1	Clacton Town
3	Basingstoke Town	2–1	Maidenhead United
4	Belper Town	3–2	Curzon Ashton
5	Bideford	0–1	Saltash United
6	Billericay Town	0–0	Lowestoft Town
7	Bishop's Stortford	3–1	Spalding United
8	Brereton Social	6–3	New Brighton
9	Bridport	2–1	Mangotsfield United
10	Caernarfon Town	1–4	Colwyn Bay
11	Cambridge City	2–3	Sudbury Town
12	Canterbury City	1–0	Sheppey United
13	Chatham Town	1–2	Tonbridge
14	Chesham United	2–1	St Albans City
15	Cinderford Town	0–0	Llanelli
16	Clandown	2–2	Moor Green
17	Clapton	1–0	Wembley
18	Clevedon Town	1–1	Knighton Town
19	Darlaston	0–2	Bilston
20	Dawlish Town	6–3	Paulton Rovers
21	Eastwood Town	1–2	Bridlington Trinity
22	Epsom & Ewell	2–5	Tilbury
23	Farnborough Town	3–0	Camberley Town
24	Finchley	1–1	Corby Town
25	Glastonbury	4–1	Ilminster Town
26	Hampton	2–2	Salisbury
27	Horsham	2–0	Lewes
28	Keynsham Town	2–4	Dudley Town
29	Kirkby Town	0–1	Workington
30	Pwllheli & District	0–0	Rhyl
31	Ramsgate	0–3	Walton & Hersham
32	Rossendale United	1–1	Accrington Stanley
33	Shepton Mallet Town	0–1	Maesteg Park
34	Sittingbourne	1–3	Kingstonian
35	Sutton Coldfield Town	2–1	Ilkeston Town
36	Tamworth	1–2	Arnold
37	Wellingborough Town	4–1	Wisbech Town
38	Welton Rovers	0–2	Pontllanfraith

=== Replays ===
Tie	Home team	Score	Away team
6	Lowestoft Town	1–7	Billericay Town
15	Llanelli	1–0	Cinderford Town
16	Moor Green	5–3	Clandown
18	Knighton Town	0–1	Clevedon Town
24	Corby Town	4–0	Finchley
26	Salisbury	2–1	Hampton
30	Rhyl	3–0	Pwllheli & District
32	Accrington Stanley	1–0	Rossendale United

== First qualifying round ==
=== Ties ===
Tie	Home team	Score	Away team
1	Accrington Stanley	4–1	St Helens Town
2	Alfreton Town	1–1	Dudley Town
3	Alvechurch	2–2	Bromsgrove Rovers
4	Ashford Town (Kent)	0–3	Addlestone & Weybridge Town
5	Banbury United	2–0	Hertford Town
6	Basingstoke Town	2–2	Hounslow
7	Belper Town	0–2	Bedworth United
8	Billericay Town	6–0	Milton Keynes City
9	Bilston	1–2	South Liverpool
10	Bootle	2–1	Colwyn Bay
11	Boreham Wood	0–0	Corby Town
12	Bridgwater Town	2–2	Maesteg Park
13	Bridlington Trinity	4–0	Darwen
14	Bromley	1–2	Carshalton Athletic
15	Canterbury City	3–1	Andover
16	Chelmsford City	1–2	Bishop's Stortford
17	Chesham United	0–1	Witney Town
18	Clapton	2–1	Farnborough Town
19	Consett	1–1	Fleetwood Town
20	Crawley Town	3–2	Fareham Town
21	Croydon	2–0	Aveley
22	Droylsden	1–3	Goole Town
23	Dunstable	2–2	Wellingborough Town
24	Enderby Town	2–0	Long Eaton United
25	Evenwood Town	1–3	Willington
26	Falmouth Town	2–1	Pontllanfraith
27	Ferryhill Athletic	3–2	Emley
28	Folkestone	2–1	Tilbury
29	Formby	0–3	Oswestry Town
30	Gateshead	1–0	Durham City
31	Gloucester City	3–1	Glastonbury
32	Harwich & Parkeston	1–2	Harlow Town
33	Hednesford Town	2–0	Arnold
34	Hitchin Town	3–1	Ware
35	Horsham	0–0	Bognor Regis Town
36	Horwich R M I	0–3	Penrith
37	Leytonstone Ilford	1–1	Hillingdon Borough
38	Llanelli	1–2	Salisbury
39	Lye Town	1–1	Leek Town
40	Macclesfield Town	3–4	Sutton Coldfield Town
41	Margate	4–1	Metropolitan Police
42	Moor Green	4–3	A P Leamington
43	Nantwich Town	3–4	Brereton Social
44	Netherfield	2–0	Mexborough Town Athletic
45	New Mills	0–2	Buxton
46	North Shields	2–5	Workington
47	Poole Town	0–1	Dawlish Town
48	Redditch United	1–0	Highgate United
49	Rhyl	2–0	Hyde United
50	Saltash United	3–2	Trowbridge Town
51	Southport	1–0	Burscough
52	Staines Town	2–2	Gosport Borough
53	Sudbury Town	2–3	King's Lynn
54	Taunton Town	3–0	Clevedon Town
55	Tonbridge	1–1	Kingstonian
56	Tow Law Town	0–2	South Bank
57	Walton & Hersham	1–1	Wokingham Town
58	Waterlooville	2–1	Hayes
59	Wealdstone	2–4	Oxford City
60	West Auckland Town	1–2	Shildon
61	Weston super Mare	3–0	Bridport
62	Whitby Town	2–2	Ashton United
63	Whitley Bay	2–2	Billingham Synthonia
64	Worksop Town	1–2	Stourbridge

=== Replays ===
Tie	Home team	Score	Away team
2	Dudley Town	1–0	Alfreton Town
3	Bromsgrove Rovers	0–2	Alvechurch
6	Hounslow	0–1	Basingstoke Town
11	Corby Town	4–1	Boreham Wood
12	Maesteg Park	0–1	Bridgwater Town
19	Fleetwood Town	2–3	Consett
23	Wellingborough Town	2–4	Dunstable
35	Bognor Regis Town	4–2	Horsham
37	Hillingdon Borough	1–3	Leytonstone Ilford
39	Leek Town	2–1	Lye Town
52	Gosport Borough	1–0	Staines Town
55	Kingstonian	4–0	Tonbridge
57	Wokingham Town	3–0	Walton & Hersham
62	Ashton United	1–2	Whitby Town
63	Billingham Synthonia	8–2	Whitley Bay

== Second qualifying round ==
=== Ties ===
Tie	Home team	Score	Away team
1	Addlestone & Weybridge Town	2–1	Dunstable
2	Banbury United	1–2	Harlow Town
3	Basingstoke Town	1–0	Corby Town
4	Bedworth United	3–0	Moor Green
5	Billingham Synthonia	0–0	Goole Town
6	Bishop's Stortford	2–0	Kingstonian
7	Brereton Social	1–0	Enderby Town
8	Clapton	2–2	Wokingham Town
9	Consett	0–1	Accrington Stanley
10	Crawley Town	0–4	Bognor Regis Town
11	Croydon	1–0	Oxford City
12	Dudley Town	0–0	Stourbridge
13	Falmouth Town	1–3	Saltash United
14	Folkestone	2–4	Leytonstone Ilford
15	Gateshead	5–0	Ferryhill Athletic
16	Gloucester City	1–0	Bridgwater Town
17	Gosport Borough	4–1	Canterbury City
18	Hednesford Town	3–2	Buxton
19	Hitchin Town	3–0	Billericay Town
20	Netherfield	0–0	Bridlington Trinity
21	Oswestry Town	2–1	Leek Town
22	Redditch United	3–0	King's Lynn
23	Salisbury	2–1	Dawlish Town
24	Shildon	0–1	Southport
25	South Bank	2–2	Penrith
26	South Liverpool	5–1	Rhyl
27	Sutton Coldfield Town	1–1	Alvechurch
28	Waterlooville	1–1	Margate
29	Weston super Mare	3–2	Taunton Town
30	Willington	0–4	Bootle
31	Witney Town	1–2	Carshalton Athletic
32	Workington	1–2	Whitby Town

=== Replays ===
Tie	Home team	Score	Away team
5	Goole Town	1–2	Billingham Synthonia (Billingham Synthonia disqualified)
8	Wokingham Town	1–0	Clapton
12	Stourbridge	3–2	Dudley Town
20	Bridlington Trinity	1–1	Netherfield
25	Penrith	2–1	South Bank
27	Alvechurch	3–1	Sutton Coldfield Town
28	Margate	3–1	Waterlooville

=== 2nd replay ===
Tie	Home team	Score	Away team
20	Netherfield	2–2	Bridlington Trinity

=== 3rd replay ===
Tie	Home team	Score	Away team
20	Netherfield	1–1	Bridlington Trinity

=== 4th replay ===
Tie	Home team	Score	Away team
20	Netherfield	1–1	Bridlington Trinity

=== 5th Replay ===
Tie	Home team	Score	Away team
20	Netherfield	2–2	Bridlington Trinity

=== 6th Replay ===
Tie	Home team	Score	Away team
20	Netherfield	2–0	Bridlington Trinity

== Third qualifying round ==
=== Ties ===
Tie	Home team	Score	Away team
1	Addlestone & Weybridge Town	2–5	Carshalton Athletic
2	Aylesbury United	1–0	Gosport Borough
3	Barnet	0–1	Harlow Town
4	Barnstaple Town	0–0	Dorchester Town
5	Bath City	1–1	Merthyr Tydfil
6	Bedworth United	1–0	Telford United
7	Bishop Auckland	1–1	Scarborough
8	Bishop's Stortford	1–0	Hendon
9	Bognor Regis Town	2–1	Harrow Borough
10	Bootle	3–1	Oswestry Town
11	Bridgend Town	2–0	Salisbury
12	Burton Albion	3–1	Stourbridge
13	Crook Town	1–3	Gateshead
14	Dartford	3–1	Margate
15	Dover	2–5	Hitchin Town
16	Frome Town	0–0	Saltash United
17	Goole Town	3–1	Whitby Town
18	Grantham	1–3	Gloucester City
19	Hastings United	2–1	Basingstoke Town
20	Hednesford Town	0–1	Winsford United
21	Horden Colliery Welfare	0–1	Penrith
22	Leytonstone Ilford	2–0	Croydon
23	Morecambe	0–0	Frickley Athletic
24	Netherfield	2–1	Accrington Stanley
25	Northwich Victoria	2–1	Boston
26	Redditch United	1–2	Kidderminster Harriers
27	Slough Town	6–0	Wokingham Town
28	South Liverpool	0–3	Alvechurch
29	Southport	1–2	Lancaster City
30	Stalybridge Celtic	3–0	Gainsborough Trinity
31	Weston super Mare	1–1	Minehead
32	Witton Albion	3–0	Brereton Social

=== Replays ===
Tie	Home team	Score	Away team
4	Dorchester Town	2–1	Barnstaple Town
5	Merthyr Tydfil	1–3	Bath City
7	Scarborough	4–2	Bishop Auckland
16	Saltash United	2–4	Frome Town
23	Frickley Athletic	0–2	Morecambe
31	Minehead	5–2	Weston super Mare

== 1st round ==
The teams that given byes to this round are Dagenham, Altrincham, Weymouth, Worcester City, Boston United, Gravesend & Northfleet, Maidstone United, Kettering Town, Bangor City, Nuneaton Borough, Yeovil Town, Barrow, Stafford Rangers, Matlock Town, Bedford Town, Runcorn, Enfield, Wycombe Wanderers, Leatherhead, Tooting & Mitcham United, Spennymoor United, Marine, Blyth Spartans, Cheltenham Town, Mossley, Barking, Chorley, Walthamstow Avenue, Dulwich Hamlet, Sutton United, Woking and Ashington.

=== Ties ===
Tie	Home team	Score	Away team
1	Altrincham	3–2	Spennymoor United
2	Alvechurch	4–2	Penrith
3	Aylesbury United	2–2	Enfield
4	Bedford Town	3–1	Dulwich Hamlet
5	Bishop's Stortford	1–1	Bridgend Town
6	Boston United	4–0	Gateshead
7	Burton Albion	0–2	Blyth Spartans
8	Carshalton Athletic	3–0	Barking
9	Cheltenham Town	0–1	Wycombe Wanderers
10	Chorley	1–2	Netherfield
11	Dagenham	4–0	Bath City
12	Dartford	4–1	Slough Town
13	Dorchester Town	0–1	Walthamstow Avenue
14	Frome Town	1–1	Yeovil Town
15	Goole Town	2–0	Morecambe
16	Gravesend & Northfleet	2–3	Kettering Town
17	Harlow Town	2–0	Bognor Regis Town
18	Hastings United	1–1	Maidstone United
19	Hitchin Town	2–1	Tooting & Mitcham United
20	Kidderminster Harriers	2–2	Bedworth United
21	Lancaster City	2–2	Winsford United
22	Leatherhead	1–3	Weymouth
23	Leytonstone Ilford	7–0	Gloucester City
24	Marine	2–0	Matlock Town
25	Minehead	1–3	Worcester City
26	Mossley	2–2	Scarborough
27	Northwich Victoria	3–0	Barrow
28	Nuneaton Borough	1–2	Ashington
29	Runcorn	0–1	Stafford Rangers
30	Stalybridge Celtic	2–3	Bootle
31	Witton Albion	0–3	Bangor City
32	Woking	0–1	Sutton United

=== Replays ===
Tie	Home team	Score	Away team
3	Enfield	0–0	Aylesbury United
5	Bridgend Town	1–2	Bishop's Stortford
14	Yeovil Town	2–1	Frome Town
18	Maidstone United	1–2	Hastings United
20	Bedworth United	1–0	Kidderminster Harriers
21	Winsford United	5–2	Lancaster City
26	Scarborough	0–1	Mossley

=== 2nd replay ===
Tie	Home team	Score	Away team
3	Aylesbury United	1–0	Enfield

== 2nd round ==
=== Ties ===
Tie	Home team	Score	Away team
1	Alvechurch	4–1	Bedworth United
2	Aylesbury United	2–0	Netherfield
3	Blyth Spartans	1–0	Stafford Rangers
4	Bootle	0–0	Carshalton Athletic
5	Boston United	0–1	Hitchin Town
6	Dagenham	1–1	Bishop's Stortford
7	Dartford	1–0	Ashington
8	Goole Town	1–4	Worcester City
9	Harlow Town	0–1	Northwich Victoria
10	Kettering Town	0–1	Mossley
11	Leytonstone Ilford	1–1	Weymouth
12	Marine	0–1	Bangor City
13	Sutton United	5–1	Wycombe Wanderers
14	Walthstow Avenue	0–0	Bedford Town
15	Winsford United	0–2	Altrincham
16	Yeovil Town	1–1	Hastings United

=== Replays ===
Tie	Home team	Score	Away team
4	Carshalton Athletic	2–1	Bootle
6	Bishop's Stortford	3–1	Dagenham
11	Weymouth	3–4	Leytonstone Ilford
14	Bedford Town	1–0	Walthamstow Avenue
16	Hastings United	2–1	Yeovil Town

== 3rd round ==
=== Ties ===
Tie	Home team	Score	Away team
1	Aylesbury United	0–0	Northwich Victoria
2	Bangor City	1–0	Hitchin Town
3	Bishop's Stortford	3–2	Alvechurch
4	Carshalton Athletic	0–3	Mossley
5	Dartford	1–0	Blyth Spartans
6	Hastings United	0–0	Worcester City
7	Leytonstone Ilford	0–1	Altrincham
8	Sutton United	3–0	Bedford Town

=== Replays ===
Tie	Home team	Score	Away team
1	Northwich Victoria	1–1	Aylesbury United
6	Worcester City	2–1	Hastings United

=== 2nd replay ===
Tie	Home team	Score	Away team
1	Aylesbury United	1–0	Northwich Victoria

== 4th round ==
=== Ties ===
Tie	Home team	Score	Away team
1	Bangor City	5–3	Mossley
2	Bishop's Stortford	4–0	Worcester City
3	Dartford	3–1	Altrincham
4	Sutton United	0–0	Aylesbury United

=== Replay ===
Tie	Home team	Score	Away team
4	Aylesbury United	0–1	Sutton United

== Semi finals ==
=== First leg ===
Tie	Home team	Score	Away team
1	Bangor City	2–2	Sutton United
2	Dartford	1–1	Bishop's Stortford

=== Second leg ===
Tie	Home team	Score	Away team	Aggregate
1	Sutton United	4–1	Bangor City	6–3
2	Bishop's Stortford	2–1	Dartford	3–2

== Final ==
16 May 1981
15:00

Bishop's Stortford	1–0	Sutton United
Sullivan 90'

Wembley Stadium, London
Attendance: 22,578
