= Gwynfi United F.C. =

Association football club in Wales

Gwynfi United
- Full name: Gwynfi United Football Club
- League: Port Talbot Football League
- 2025–26: Port Talbot Football League First Division, 4th of 8

Gwynfi United F.C. is a Welsh football club from Blaengwynfi, a village in the Neath Port Talbot area of South Wales. They play in the Port Talbot Football League. The club played in the Welsh Football League for eleven seasons from 1996–97 until 2006–07 when they resigned from the league and their results from the season were expunged.

== History ==
Gwynfi United were an established club in the South Wales Amateur League, winning the Division Two title in 1985 and 1995. Newly promoted to Division One, Gwynfi won the league title, and joined the Welsh Football League.

The club won the Division Three title in their first season in the Welsh League. In 1999, they finished second in Division Two, achieving promotion to Division One, at the second tier of Welsh football. The following season they finished ninth, which was their highest ever league finish. In 2005, they were relegated to Division Two, and were again relegated the next season, returning to Division Three. In January 2007, the club resigned from the Welsh League, and took the place of their reserve team in the Port Talbot Football League.

In 2008, Gwynfi were promoted to the Port Talbot League Premier Division, following a second place finish in Division One. In their first season in the Premier Division they finished second, 18 points behind last season's Division One champions Real Bay View. In the same season they won the Port Talbot League Challenge Cup.

In 2012, Gwynfi left the Port Talbot League, following a 4th place finish in the Premier Division. By 2013 they had returned to the league, in the Premier Division.

In the 2019–20 season they received a 15 point deduction which cost them promotion to the South Wales Alliance League.

== Welsh Football League history ==
Information in this section is sourced from the Football Club History Database.

Season	Pyramid Tier	League	Final position
1996–97	4	Welsh Football League Division Three	1st - Champions (promoted)
1997–98	3	Welsh Football League Division Two	4th
1998–99	3	Welsh Football League Division Two	2nd - Runners-Up (promoted)
1999–2000	2	Welsh Football League Division One	9th
2000–01	2	Welsh Football League Division One	12th
2001–02	2	Welsh Football League Division One	10th
2002–03	2	Welsh Football League Division One	14th
2003–04	2	Welsh Football League Division One	15th
2004–05	2	Welsh Football League Division One	17th (relegated)
2005–06	3	Welsh Football League Division Two	18th (relegated)
2006–07	4	Welsh Football League Division Three	Resigned from the league (record expunged)

== Honours ==
- Welsh Football League Division Three – Champions: 1996–97
- Welsh Football League Division Two – Runners-up: 1997–98
- South Wales Amateur League Division One – Champions: 1995–96
- South Wales Amateur League Division Two – Champions: 1984–85, 1994–95
- Port Talbot Football League Challenge Cup – Winners: 2008–09
