= Port Talbot Football League =

- Founded: 1926
- Country: Wales
- Confederation: UEFA
- Divisions: Premier Division
- Number of clubs: 16
- Level on pyramid: 7
- Promotion to: South Wales Premier League Division One
- Domestic cup: Port Talbot Open Cup
- League cup: Port Talbot League Cup
- Current champions: Porthcawl Town Athletic Reserves (2025–26)
- Website: League website

The Port Talbot & District Football League, also known as the Port Talbot Football League, is a league competition featuring non-professional association football clubs in the area of Port Talbot, South Wales. Founded in 1926, it is one of the oldest such competition in Wales. The first champions were Baglan United. The main competition consists of two divisions named "Premier League" & "Division One" . The Premier League is a feeder to the South Wales Alliance League Division One, and therefore sits at tier 7 of the Welsh football pyramid.

== Background ==
The league is currently one division. It has recently also run as a single division which splits at the midway point. The split consisted of the Port Talbot Premier League, followed by the Port Talbot Division One.

The League is administered by Mr T. Lewis (chairman), Mr A. Short (Vice Chairman), Mr B. Owen (Treasurer) and Mr David King (General Secretary).

Among the clubs who have progressed to a higher level from the Port Talbot Football League is Goytre United, Cornelly United and Tata Steel.

Promotion from the Premier League is possible to the lowest tier of the South Wales Premier League, with the champion of the league playing the other tier 7 champions from the South Wales regional leagues via play-off games to determine promotion.

== League membership 2026–27 ==
=== Premier League ===
- Afan United (reserves)
- Baglan Dragons (reserves)
- Cornelly United
- Cornelly United (reserves)
- Croeserw Athletic
- Cwmavon BGC
- Cwmavon BGC (reserves)
- FC Porthcawl (reserves)
- Glyncorrwg
- Gwynfi United
- Kenfig Hill
- Margam Youth (reserves)
- Port Talbot Town (reserves)
- Porthcawl Town (reserves)
- Porthcawl Town (thirds)
- Tata Steel United (reserves)

== Divisional history - Premier Division champions ==
- 1983–84: Abercregan United
- 1994–95: Trefelin BGC
- 1997–98: Glyncorrwg United
- 1998–99: Cwmafan Phoenix (Note: The title was awarded to Cwmafan Phoenix in June 1999. Glyncorrwg United failed to complete their fixtures, finishing with 2 games left, and were 6 points behind Cwmafan. The Glyncorrwg chairman said they could have won the league on goal difference if the matches were played, and called for the league's chairman and vice-chairman to "do the honourable thing and resign". Runners-up Tyn-y-Twr also would have been able to win the title (by 2 points ahead of Cwmafan), had they won their one remaining fixture against Glyncorrwg. The fixture secretary said that the league took the decision because the season was finished, and the fact clubs could not finish their fixtures (even with the season extended by a month) was not the league's fault.)
- 1999–2000: Glyncorrwg United
- 2006–07: Grove Park
- 2007–08: Grove Park
- 2008–09: Real Bay View CF
- 2009–10: Cornelly United
- 2010–11: Cwmafan
- 2011–12: Cornelly United
- 2012–13: Margam YC
- 2013–14: Glyncorrwg
- 2014–15: Goytre United reserves
- 2015–16: Cwmafan
- 2016–17: Cwmafan
- 2017–18: Cwmafan
- 2018–19: Tata Steel United
- 2019–20: Glyncorrwg
- 2020–21: No competition
- 2021–22: Margam YC
- 2022–23: Afan United (promoted to SWAL through play-off finals)
- 2023–24: Margam YC (promoted to SW Premier League)
- 2024–25: FC Porthcawl (promoted to SW Premier League via play-off finals)
- 2025–26: Porthcawl Town Athletic Reserves
