= Welsh Football League Division Two =

Association football league in Wales

Nathanielcars.co.uk Welsh League Second Division
- Folded: 2020
- Country: Wales
- Number of clubs: 16
- Level on pyramid: 2 (1904–1992); 3 (1992–2019); 4 (2019–2020)
- Promotion to: Welsh Football League Division One
- Domestic cup(s): Welsh Cup; Welsh Football League Cup
- Last champions: Penrhiwceiber Rangers (2019–20)

The Welsh Football League Division Two, (last known as the Nathanielcars.co.uk Welsh League Division Two, for sponsorship reasons) was a football league and forms the fourth level of the Welsh football league system in South Wales.

If the team which finishes top of the division has good enough ground facilities, traditionally it was promoted to the Welsh Football League Division One and is replaced by the team finishing bottom of Division One. The team finishing in bottom position is relegated to the Welsh Football League Division Three. For the 2019–20 season promotion was to the newly formed Ardal Leagues at Tier 3 and relegation was to one of the regional leagues.

From its inception in 1904 it always sat below the top flight of the Welsh League, or the Rhymney Valley League and Glamorgan League as it was known until 1912. This division has changed its title on numerous occasions to follow suit of the other leagues within the competition; for seven years in the 1980s it was known as the Premier Division as the top flight adopted the National Division name, while Division Two was split into two sections - A & B and West & East - for many years before 1965.

In 1992 it became level three of the Welsh Football Pyramid following the creation of the Welsh Premier League.

After the creation of the Cymru South, for the 2019–20 season, the league was rebranded and Welsh Football League Division Two incorporated the former Division Three teams.

== Member clubs for the final 2019–20 season ==
Locations of 6 of the teams in the Welsh Football League Division Two season 2019–20
Locations of remaining 10 teams in the Welsh Football League Division Two season 2019–20
- Aberdare Town
- Abertillery Bluebirds
- AFC Porth
- Albion Rovers
- Chepstow Town
- Newport City
- Panteg
- Penrhiwceiber Rangers
- Pontyclun
- Tredegar Town
- Treharris Athletic Western
- Trethomas Bluebirds
- Treowen Stars
- West End
- Ynyshir Albions
- Ynysygerwn

== Champions (as level 2 of the Welsh League) ==
Information from 1913-14 onwards is sourced from the Welsh Football Data Archive section for the Welsh Football League.

Rhymney Valley League Division 2

- 1905–06: Abergavenny
- 1906–07: Pontlottyn
- 1907–08: Treharris Reserves
- 1908–09: Gilfach
- 1909–10: shared between Cwm and Troedyrhiw

Glamorgan League Division 2

- 1910–11: Pontlottyn Town
- 1911–12: Troedyrhiw
- 1912–13: Troedyrhiw

Welsh Football League Division 2

- 1913–14: Troedyrhiw
- 1914–15: Bargoed
- 1915–20: no competitions
- 1919–20: Aberdare Amateurs
- 1920–21: Rhymney
- 1921–22: unknown
- 1922–23: unknown
- 1923–24: unknown
- 1924–25: unknown
- 1925–26:
  - Section A: Llanbradach
  - Section B: Troedyrhiw Welfare
- 1926–27:
  - Section A: Ystrad Mynach
  - Section B: Troedyrhiw Welfare
- 1927–28:unknown
- 1928–29: Abertysswg
- 1929–30: unknown
- 1930–31: unknown
- 1931–32: Troedyrhiw
- 1932–33:
  - Eastern Division: Gelli Colliery
  - Western Division: Llanelly A
- 1933–34: unknown
- 1934–35: unknown
- 1935–36: unknown
- 1936–37: unknown
  - Eastern Division: Abercynon
  - Western Division: Milford Haven
- 1937–38: unknown
- 1939–45: Football suspended due to World War Two
- 1945–46:
  - Eastern Division: Lovell's Athletic reserves
  - Western Division: Brynna United
- 1946–47:
  - Eastern Division: Penrhiwceiber
  - Western Division: Briton Ferry Athletic
- 1947–48:
  - Eastern Division: Bargoed United
  - Western Division: Pembroke Borough
- 1948–49
  - Eastern Division: Senghenydd Town
  - Western Division: Cwmparc
- 1949–50:
  - Eastern Division: Nelson Welfare
  - Western Division: Llanelly
- 1950–51:
  - Eastern Division: Abergavenny Thursdays
  - Western Division: Cwmparc
- 1951–52:
  - Eastern Division: Barry Town
  - Western Division: Aberystwyth Town
- 1952–53:
  - Eastern Division: Pontllanfraith
  - Western Division: Tonyrefail
- 1953–54:
  - Eastern Division: Nelson
  - Western Division: Atlas Sports (Swansea)
- 1954–55:
  - Eastern Division: Brecon Corinthians
  - Western Division: Gwynfi Welfare
- 1955–56:
  - Eastern Division: Cwmparc
  - Western Division: Haverfordwest
- 1956–57:
  - Eastern Division: Cardiff Corinthians
  - Western Division: Port Talbot Athletic
- 1957–58:
  - Eastern Division: Barry Town
  - Western Division: Llanelly
- 1958–59:
  - Eastern Division: Tredomen Works
  - Western Division: Bettws FC (Ammanford)
- 1959–60:
  - Eastern Division: Cardiff Corinthians
  - Western Division: Carmarthen Town
- 1960–61:
  - Eastern Division: Ebbw Vale
  - Western Division: Pontardawe Athletic
- 1961–62:
  - Eastern Division: Ferndale Athletic
  - Western Division: Port Talbot Athletic
- 1962–63:
  - Eastern Division: Bridgend Town
  - Western Division: Milford United
- 1963–64:
  - Eastern Division: South Wales Switchgear
  - Western Division: Clydach United

Welsh Football League Division 1

- 1964–65: Ebbw Vale
- 1965–66: Ammanford Town
- 1966–67: Tonyrefail Welfare
- 1967–68: Caerleon
- 1968–69: Caerau Athletic
- 1969–70: Swansea University
- 1970–71: Cardiff Corinthians
- 1971–72: Briton Ferry Athletic
- 1972–73: Lewistown
- 1973–74: Pontllanfraith
- 1974–75: Spencer Works
- 1975–76: Cardiff College of Education
- 1976–77: Caerau Athletic
- 1977–78: Cardiff Corinthians
- 1978–79: Maesteg Park Athletic
- 1979–80: Haverfordwest County
- 1980–81: Sully
- 1981–82: Brecon Corinthians
- 1982–83: Abercynon Athletic

Welsh Football League Premier Division

- 1983–84: Sully
- 1984–85: Cardiff Corinthians
- 1985–86: Sully
- 1986–87: AFC Cardiff
- 1987–88: Afan Lido
- 1988–89: Afan Lido
- 1989–90: Sully

Welsh Football League Division 1

- 1990–91: Morriston Town
- 1991–92: Blaenrhondda

== Champions (as Step 3 of the pyramid) ==
Welsh Football League Division 2

- 1992–93: AFC Porth
- 1993–94: Taffs Well
- 1994–95: Penrhiwceiber Rangers
- 1995–96: Grange Harlequins
- 1996–97: Bridgend Town
- 1997–98: Pontardawe Town
- 1998–99: Penrhiwceiber Rangers
- 1999–2000: Fields Park Pontllanfraith
- 2000–01: Garw Athletic
- 2001–02: Garden Village
- 2002–03: Dinas Powys
- 2003–04: Skewen Athletic
- 2004–05: Pontardawe Town
- 2005–06: Pontypridd Town
- 2006–07: Garw Athletic
- 2007–08: Bettws
- 2008–09: West End
- 2009–10: Penrhiwceiber Rangers
- 2010–11: Ton Pentre
- 2011–12: Monmouth Town
- 2012–13: Goytre
- 2013–14: Cardiff Metropolitan University
- 2014–15: Barry Town United
- 2015–16: Caldicot Town
- 2016–17: Llanelli Town
- 2017–18: Llantwit Major
- 2018–19: STM Sports

== Champions (as Step 4 of the pyramid) ==
Welsh Football League Division 2

- 2019–20: Penrhiwceiber Rangers

== See also ==
- Football in Wales
- Welsh football league system
- Welsh Cup
- Welsh League Cup
- FAW Premier Cup
- List of football clubs in Wales
- List of stadiums in Wales by capacity
