= A.F.C. Cardiff =

Association football club in Cardiff, Wales

- Full name: A.F.C. Cardiff
- Founded: c.1977 (as Lake United)
- Dissolved: 1990 (merged with Sully F.C. to form Inter Cardiff F.C.)
- Ground: Cwrt-y-Ala

A.F.C. Cardiff was a football club based in Cardiff, Wales. It was founded as Lake United during the 1960s before being renamed A.F.C. Cardiff in 1984.

After winning back-to-back promotions between 1979 and 1981, moving from the Second Division to the Premier Division, the club won the Welsh Football League Cup in 1984 and were champions of the Welsh Football League Division Two (then known as the "Welsh Football League Premier Division") in 1987, winning promotion to the Welsh National League. It was dissolved in 1990, when it merged with Sully F.C. to form Inter Cardiff F.C.

== Honours ==
League

- Welsh Football League Premier Division
  - Champions: 1986–87
  - Runners-up: 1985–86
- Welsh Football League Division One
  - Runners-up: 1980–81^{[a]}
- Welsh Football League Division Two
  - Champions: 1979–80^{[a]}
- South Wales Amateur League Division Two
  - Champions: 1974–75

Cups

- Welsh Football League Cup
  - Champions: 1984^{[a]}
  - Runners-up: 1987

== See also ==
- Cardiff Metropolitan University F.C.

== Notes ==
1. ^{a} as Lake United F.C.
