= Tonyrefail Welfare A.F.C. =

Tonyrefail Welfare
- Full name: Tonyrefail Welfare Association Football Club
- Founded: 1925
- Ground: The Welfare Park; Tonyrefail; Wales
- Chairman: Andrew Roberts
- Manager: Andrew Roberts
Home colours	Away colours

Tonyrefail Welfare Association Football Club is a football club based in Tonyrefail, Rhondda Cynon Taf, Wales. The club currently competes in the . Founded in 1925, Tonyrefail Welfare was a member of the Welsh Football League from 1952 to 1999, during which time they achieved considerable success, including winning the Division One championship in 1966–67 and reaching multiple cup finals.

== History ==
=== Formation and early years ===
Tonyrefail Welfare AFC was established around 1925, coinciding with the opening of the Welfare Park in Tonyrefail. The club's formation was part of the broader welfare movement that saw the establishment of sports and recreational facilities for working-class communities across South Wales. During its early years, the club competed in local leagues and achieved notable success in both league and cup competitions.

=== Post-war success ===
Following the Second World War, Tonyrefail Welfare joined the South Wales Amateur League, where they continued their successful trajectory. The club won the league championship in 1951 and secured the Corinthian Cup in both 1950 and 1952. A particularly notable achievement was winning the Brecon Corinthian Cup in three consecutive years from 1949 to 1951, establishing the club as a dominant force in Welsh amateur football.

=== Welsh Football League era ===
In 1952, Tonyrefail Welfare made the significant step up to join the Welsh Football League, beginning in the 1952–53 season. The club made an immediate impact by winning the Division Two West title in their inaugural season. This promotion marked the beginning of a 46-season tenure in the Welsh Football League system that would last until their relegation in 1998–99.

The club's golden period occurred during the 1950s and 1960s, when they regularly competed in the Premier Division and achieved their greatest success by winning the Division One championship in 1966–67. During this era, Tonyrefail Welfare also made several notable cup final appearances, reaching the South Wales FA Senior Cup final on three occasions (1954, 1967, and 1969) and the Welsh Amateur Cup final in 1969, though they finished as runners-up in each instance.

=== Decline and modern era ===
Following their relegation from the Welsh Football League in 1998–99, Tonyrefail Welfare experienced a period of significant decline. The club struggled to maintain its position in the lower divisions and faced financial difficulties that brought them to the brink of liquidation in 2004.

In 2009, the club faced another setback when a stand collapsed at the Welfare Ground. Although no injuries occurred, the incident led to the closure of their historic home ground. The club's on-field fortunes also continued to decline, culminating in relegation to the Rhondda & District League Premier Division following a poor 2010–11 season. This represented a significant fall from grace for a club that had once competed at the highest levels of Welsh football.

The club began to stabilise in the late 2010s, and at the start of the 2017–18 season, Tonyrefail Welfare returned to play at their historic Welfare Park ground, marking a symbolic homecoming for the club.

== Ground and facilities ==
Tonyrefail Welfare play their home matches at the Welfare Park in Tonyrefail. The ground was opened in 1925 as part of the welfare movement that provided recreational facilities for working-class communities across South Wales. The venue served as the club's home throughout their most successful periods in the Welsh Football League.

In 2009, the club faced a significant challenge when a stand at the Welfare Ground collapsed, though fortunately no injuries occurred. This incident forced the temporary closure of the ground and the club had to seek alternative venues. After several years playing away from their traditional home, Tonyrefail Welfare returned to the Welfare Park at the start of the 2017–18 season, marking an important milestone in the club's recent history.

== Honours ==
Welsh Football League

- Division One – Champions: 1966–67
- Division Two West – Champions: 1952–53

South Wales Amateur League

- Champions: 1951

Cup competitions

- Corinthian Cup: 1950, 1952
- Brecon Corinthian Cup: 1949, 1950, 1951

Cup final appearances

- South Wales FA Senior Cup – Runners-up: 1954, 1967, 1969
- Welsh Amateur Cup – Runners-up: 1969
