= Tata Steel United F.C. =

Association football club in Wales

Tata Steel United
- Full name: Tata Steel United Football Club
- Nickname: Scow
- Founded: 1954
- Ground: Tata Sports Ground, Margam, Port Tabot
- Capacity: 100
- Chairman: Anthony Morgan
- Manager: Luke Rees
- League: South Wales Premier League Premier Division
- 2025–26: South Wales Premier League Division Championship Division, 2nd of 12 (promoted)

Tata Steel United F.C. (formerly Tata Steel F.C, Corus Steel F.C, British Steel (Port Talbot) F.C.) is a football club from Port Talbot. They play in the South Wales Premier League Premier Division.

== History ==
The club played in the South Wales Amateur League as British Steel (Port Talbot) before changing its name in 2003 to Corus Steel. The following year the club finished runners-up in Division 1 - and followed this up again with another second-place finish in 2005–06. In the 2008–09 season they improved on this, winning promotion to the Welsh Football League Division Three as champions. In 2010–11 the club finished as runner-up, winning promotion to the Welsh Football League Division Two.

In the 2011–12 season the club changed its name to Tata Steel F.C. following the purchase of the company by Tata Steel. The team finished second, again sealing promotion to Welsh Football League Division One, the second tier of the Welsh football league system. After two poor seasons (where they finished 14th in each season from 15 or 16 club divisions), at the end of the second season they were relegated to Division 2.

The club folded in 2016, but was reformed as Tata Steel United F.C. in 2016.

At the end of the 2018–19 season the club won promotion from the Port Talbot Football League Premier Division to the South Wales Alliance League through the play-offs.

== Honours ==
- Welsh Football League Division Two – Runners-Up: 2011–12
- Welsh Football League Division Three – Runners-Up: 2010–11
- South Wales Amateur League Division One – Champions: 1987–88, 1988–89, 1993–94, 2008–09
- South Wales Amateur League Division One – Runners-up: 2004–05; 2005–06
- Port Talbot Football League Premier Division – Champions: 2018–19
- South Wales League Championship – Runners-up: 2025–26
- South Wales League Division One West – Runners-up: 2024–25

== See also ==
- Jamshedpur FC, a football club in India which is also owned by Tata Steel
