= Troedyrhiw F.C. =

Former association football club in Wales

Troedyrhiw
- Full name: Troedyrhiw Football Club
- Dissolved: 2012
- Ground: The Willows, Troedyrhiw
Home colours	Away colours

Troedyrhiw F.C. were an association football team based in Merthyr Tydfil County Borough, where they played in the South Wales Amateur League First Division. They entered the FA Cup on six occasions in the late 1940s and early 1950s, losing at the first qualifying round stage each time. They played in the Welsh Football League finishing 14th in the 2009–10 Welsh Football League Division Three season. They then dropped to the South Wales Amateur League before folding in 2012.

== Honours ==
- South Wales Amateur Cup Winners: 1908–09
- Welsh League Division Two Champions: 1920–21
- Welsh League Division 2B Champions: 1925–26
- Welsh League Division 2B Champions: 1926–27
- Welsh League Division Two Champions: 1930–31
- Welsh League Division Two Champions: 1931–32
- Amateur Cup Winners: 1946–47
- Welsh League Runner Up: 1947–48
- Left Welsh League: 1965
- Reformed in Merthyr League: 1993
- Merthyr League Premier Champions: 1995–96
- Joined Amateur League Division Two: 1996–97
- Amateur League Division Two Champions/Int.cup Winners: 1997–98
- Amateur League Division One Champions/Int.cup Runner Up: 2000–01
- Joined Welsh League Division Three: 2001–02
- Welsh League Division Three Champions: 2004–05

== FA Cup results ==
Below is a list of all FA Cup matches played by Troedyrhiw during their only spell in the competition, from 1948 until 1953. In this period they won two Preliminary Round matches, but were knocked out of the competition at the 1st Qualifying Round stage in all six attempts.

Year	Round	Opponent	Venue	Result
1948–49	1st qualifying	Lovells Athletic	Home	1–2
1949–50	Preliminary round	Bristol Aeroplane Company	Home	3–0
1949–50	1st qualifying	Clevedon	Away	1–2
1950–51	Preliminary round	Hanham Athletic	Away	2–0
1950–51	1st qualifying	Stonehouse	Away	1–3
1951–52	1st qualifying	Barry Town	Home	1–3
1952–53	1st qualifying	Barry Town	Home	3–8
1953–54	1st qualifying	Ebbw Vale	Home	2–3
