= Pontllanfraith A.F.C. =

Former association football club in Wales

Pontllanfraith Association Football Club
- Full name: Pontllanfraith Association Football Club
- Dissolved: 1992

Pontllanfraith A.F.C. were a Welsh football club from the large village and community located in the Sirhowy Valley in Caerphilly county borough, Wales, within the historic boundaries of Monmouthshire and situated adjacent to the town of Blackwood. They played in the Welsh Football League and were associated with South Wales Switchgear, a major employer in the area who specialised in electrical equipment. In 1992 they merged with Fields Park to form Fields Park Pontllanfraith. This merged club played for 13 seasons in the Welsh Football League until 2005, when the club folded.

== Honours ==
- Welsh Football League Premier Division (Tier 1 Welsh Football Pyramid) – Champions: 1978–79
- Welsh Football League Premier Division (Tier 1 Welsh Football Pyramid) – Runners-Up: 1980–81
- Welsh Football League Division One (Tier 2 Welsh Football Pyramid) – Champions: 1973–74
- Welsh Football League Division One (Tier 2 Welsh Football Pyramid) – Runners-Up: 1964–65
- Welsh League Division Two East (Tier 2 Welsh Football Pyramid) – Champions (2): 1952–53; 1963–64
- Welsh Football League Division Two (Tier 3 Welsh Football Pyramid) – Champions: 1972–73
- Welsh Football League Cup – Winners: 1979–80; 1984–85
- Welsh Football League Cup – Runners-Up: 1977–78; 1978–79
- Monmouthshire/Gwent Amateur Cup – Winners: 1971–72

== Welsh Football League history ==
Information sourced from the Football Club History Database for Pontllanfraith and South Wales Switchgear, and the Welsh Soccer Archive.

Season	Pyramid Tier	League	Final position
1947–48	2	Welsh League Division Two East	5th
1948–49	2	Welsh League Division Two East	12th
1949–50	2	Welsh League Division Two East	3rd
1950–51	2	Welsh League Division Two East	4th
1951–52	2	Welsh League Division Two East	7th
1952–53	2	Welsh League Division Two East	1st - Champions (promoted)
1953–54	1	Welsh Football League Division One	16th
1954–55	1	Welsh Football League Division One	8th
1955–56	1	Welsh Football League Division One	4th
1956–57	1	Welsh Football League Division One	11th
1957–58	1	Welsh Football League Division One	5th
1958–59		Left the Welsh Football League	
1959–60	1	Welsh Football League Division One	13th
1960–61	1	Welsh Football League Division One	12th
1961–62	1	Welsh Football League Division One	15th
1962–63	1	Welsh Football League Division One	16th
1963–64 (Note: From this season the club was renamed South Wales Switchgear and used this name until the end of the 1969–70 season when it reverted to Pontllanfraith.)	2	Welsh Football League Division Two East	1st - Champions
1964–65 (Note: From the 1964–65 season Division 1 was renamed 'Premier Division', Division 2 East and West were replaced by 'Division One' and 'Division Two' (effectively Division Two and Division Three).)	2	Welsh Football League Division One	2nd - Runners-Up (promoted)
1965–66	1	Welsh Football League Premier Division	5th
1966–67	1	Welsh Football League Premier Division	13th
1967–68	1	Welsh Football League Premier Division	9th
1968–69	1	Welsh Football League Premier Division	6th
1969–70	1	Welsh Football League Premier Division	14th
1970–71		Left Welsh Football League	
1971–72			
1972–73	3	Welsh Football League Division Two	1st – Champions (promoted)
1973–74	2	Welsh Football League Division One	1st – Champions (promoted)
1974–75	1	Welsh Football League Premier Division	7th
1975–76	1	Welsh Football League Premier Division	8th
1976–77	1	Welsh Football League Premier Division	7th
1977–78	1	Welsh Football League Premier Division	3rd
1978–79	1	Welsh Football League Premier Division	1st – Champions
1979–80	1	Welsh Football League Premier Division	4th
1980–81	1	Welsh Football League Premier Division	2nd – Runners-Up
1981–82	1	Welsh Football League Premier Division	11th
1982–83	1	Welsh Football League Premier Division	10th
1983–84 (Note: In this season The Premier Division (Division 1) was renamed 'National Division'. The 2nd tier division was renamed 'Premier Division' with the 3rd tier division named 'Division 1'.)	1	Welsh Football League National Division	13th
1984–85	1	Welsh Football League National Division	13th
1985–86	1	Welsh Football League National Division	14th
1986–87	1	Welsh Football League National Division	9th
1987–88	1	Welsh Football League National Division	13th
1988–89	1	Welsh Football League National Division	15th
1989–90	1	Welsh Football League National Division	16th (relegated)
1990–91 (Note: In this season, The 2nd tier division was renamed 'Division One' with the 3rd tier division renamed 'Division Two'.)	2	Welsh Football League Division One	14th
1991–92	2	Welsh Football League Division One	15th
