= Merthyr Saints A.F.C. =

Association football club in Wales

Merthyr Saints
- Full name: Merthyr Saints Football Club
- Nickname: 'The Saints'
- Founded: 2000
- Ground: ICI Rifle Ground, Merthyr Tydfil
- Capacity: 1000 (100 seats)
- Chairman: Dean Powell
- Manager: Jordan Davies
- League: (resigned)
- 2024–25: South Wales Premier League Championship Division (withdrew from league)
Home colours

Merthyr Saints F.C. are a Welsh football club from the town of Merthyr Tydfil in South Wales.

Having previously played in the Welsh Football League the club last played in the , but resigned from the league in February 2025.

The club moto is ‘FORTIUS QUO FIDELIUS’ which translated means ‘Strength Through Loyalty’ and features on the club crest along with the dragon with five keys that represent the 5 Merthyr Saints.

== Merthyr Saints F.C. - Brief History ==
Merthyr Saints were elected to Division Three of the Welsh Football League in 1995, after winning the South Wales Amateur League for a third time playing under the name of Hoover Sports F.C. and sharing Penydarren Park with Merthyr Tydfil F.C.

Promotion to Welsh League Division Two was achieved at the first attempt with a third-place finish.

In 2000, Hoover Sports moved to the ICI Rifle Ground in Pant, just off the A465, the club raised £500,000 to upgrade facilities at the new ground and changed their name to Merthyr Saints F.C.

The club remained in Welsh League Division Two for ten successive seasons with the highest finishing place of fifth in 2003–04.

They were relegated to Division Three at the end of the 2006–07 and in season 2008–09 were again relegated and back in the South Wales Amateur League for the following season.

At the conclusion of the 2009–10 season, despite finishing outside the Division One relegation positions, a restructure of the Welsh football League meant they were forced to drop into the South Wales Amateur League Division Two.

The club's best performance in the FAW Welsh Cup came during the 2011–12 season when progressing to the Third Round before losing 6–0 to Cymru Premier League side Bala Town at the ICI Rifle ground.

In the 2012–13 season the club were promoted as South Wales Amateur League Division Two Champions.

Further success followed in the 2014–15 season when they finished runners-up in Division One and with the merge of the South Wales Amateur League and Senior League were placed in the South Wales Alliance League Premier Division.

In August 2022, the club announced the appointment of Jordan Davies as Merthyr Saints first team Manager.

A seven-year stay in the South Wales Alliance League Premier Division came to an end in 2022–23 after a difficult season that included a nine-point deduction.

In February 2025 the club withdrew from the Championship Division and their results from the season were expunged.

== Honours as Hoover Sports F.C. ==
Season	League	Division	Title
1971-72	Merthyr & District League	Division One	Champions
1972-73	South Wales Amateur League	Division One	Champions
1990-91	South Wales Amateur League	Division One	Champions
1993-94	Merthyr & District League	Premier Division	Champions
1994-95	South Wales Amateur League	Division One	Champions
1995-96	Welsh Football League	Division Three	Promoted

== Honours as Merthyr Saints F.C. ==
Season	League	Division	Title
2012-13	South Wales Amateur League	Division Two	Champions
2014-15	South Wales Amateur League	Division One	Runners-Up

== Club Colours ==
Merthyr Saints play in a green shirt with white sleeves, green shorts with green and white socks, the away colours consist of the colours of white, and green, however the top is white with green as a secondary colour, in addition to that they have plain, white socks as well as white shorts with a small amount of green on the sides.

== Club Officials ==
Position	Nation	Name
President	(Wales)	Ron Jones
Chairman	(Wales)	Dean Powell
Secretary	(Wales)	Peter Toomey
Treasurer	(Wales)	Hywel Llewellyn

== Coaching staff ==
Position	Nation	Name
Manager	(Wales)	Jordan Davies
Coach	(Wales)	Kerry Morgan
Coach	(Wales)	Luke Jones
Coach	(Wales)	Adam Price

== Season-by-Season as Merthyr Saints F.C. ==
Season	League & Division	Position	Played	Wins	Draws	Losses	GD	Points
2000-01	Welsh Football League - Division Two	10-16	30	12	3	15	-17	39
2001-02	Welsh Football League - Division Two	13-16	30	8	7	15	-19	31
2002-03	Welsh Football League - Division Two	14-18	34	11	5	18	-19	38
2003-04	Welsh Football League - Division Two	05-17	32	15	4	13	+2	49
2004-05	Welsh Football League - Division Two	10-18	34	12	4	18	-8	40
2005-06	Welsh Football League - Division Two	11-18	34	11	5	18	-20	38
2006-07	Welsh Football League - Division Two	15-18	34	9	6	19	-22	33
2007-08	Welsh Football League - Division Three	13-18 *	34	15	2	17	-11	37
2008-09	Welsh Football League - Division Three	18-18 *	34	4	2	28	-115	11
2009-10	South Wales Amateur League - Division One	13-16	30	10	5	15	-31	35
2010-11	South Wales Amateur League - Division Two	05-15	28	16	4	8	+31	52
2011-12	South Wales Amateur League - Division Two	05-16	30	19	4	7	+43	61
2012-13	South Wales Amateur League - Division Two	01-15	28	21	3	4	+51	66
2013-14	South Wales Amateur League - Division One	07-16	30	13	7	10	+13	46
2014-15	South Wales Amateur League - Division One	02-13	24	17	5	2	+43	56
2015-16	South Wales Alliance League – Premier	07-16	30	13	2	15	+1	41
2016-17	South Wales Alliance League – Premier	04-16	30	18	4	8	+31	58
2017-18	South Wales Alliance League – Premier	04-16	30	20	1	9	+36	61
2018-19	South Wales Alliance League – Premier	10-16	30	13	5	12	-3	44
2019-20	South Wales Alliance League – Premier	10-16 *	16	5	5	6	+5	20
2020-21	South Wales Alliance League – Premier	00-00 *	0	0	0	0	0	0
2021-22	South Wales Alliance League – Premier	08-16	30	15	2	13	+4	47
2022-23	South Wales Alliance League – Premier	14-15 *	28	3	1	24	-80	1
2023-24	South Wales Alliance League – Championship	8-11	20	6	3	11	-27	21

2007–08, Ten-point deduction. *

2008–09, Three-point deduction. *

2019–20, Season curtailed due to coronavirus pandemic, league decided on points per game basis. *

2020–21, Football in Wales below Tier One cancelled for entire season due to COVID-19 regulations. *

2022–23, Nine-point deduction. *

== FAW Welsh Cup ==
Season	Progress	Opponents	Venue	Result
2007-08	Second Round	Carmarthen Town	Home	1-2
2008-09	Preliminary Round	Pontyclun	Home	0-9
2009-10 *				
2010-11 *				
2011-12	Third Round	Bala Town	Home	0-6
2012-13	First Qualifying Round	Cwmamman United	Home	0-2
2013-14	Second Qualifying Round	Rhoose	Away	1-5
2014-15	First Qualifying Round	Cwmaman Institute	Home	0-1
2015-16	Second Qualifying Round	Llantwit Fardre	Away	1-1 (5-6 pens)
2016-17	First Round	Llandrindod Wells	Home	2-3
2017-18	Second Qualifying Round	Ammanford	Away	2-5
2018-19	Second Qualifying Round	Caldicot Town	Away	0-2
2019-20	Second Qualifying Round	Ynyshir Albions	Away	1-3
2020-21 *				
2021-22	Second Qualifying Round	Penydarren BGC	Home	0-3
2022-23	First Qualifying Round	Treharris Athletic	Away	0-11
2023-24	First Qualifying Round	Aberfan	Home	0-2

2009-10 & 2010–11, Did not compete. *

2020–21, No competition held due to the coronavirus pandemic. *
