= Blaenrhondda A.F.C. =

Blaenrhondda
- Full name: Blaenrhondda Association Football Club
- Founded: 1934
- Dissolved: 2022
- Ground: Blaenrhondda Park
- 2021–22: South Wales Alliance Premier, 9th of 16

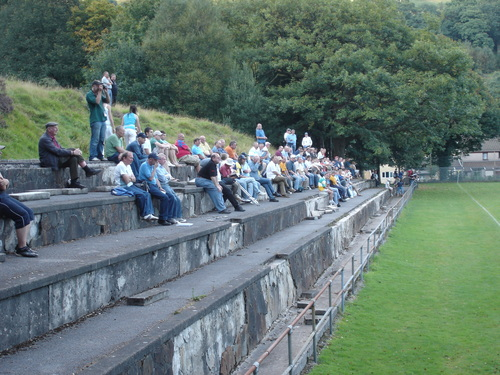
Crowd at Blaenrhondda Park in 2007

Blaenrhondda Association Football Club was an association football club based in the village of Blaenrhondda in Rhondda Cynon Taf, Wales. The club last played in the South Wales Alliance League Premier Division, part of the Welsh football league system in South Wales but folded in July 2022.

== History ==
The club had significant history in the Welsh Football League, including periods in the top two divisions from the 1970s to the 1990s.

After dropping out of the Welsh Football League the club played in the South Wales Amateur League, before dropping into the Rhondda & District League. The club joined the South Wales Alliance League for the 2017–18 season. Since then the club has secured back-to-back promotions - winning the second division in 2017–18 and finishing first division runners-up in the 2018–19 season, gaining promotion to the Premier Division.

== Honours ==
- Welsh Football League Division One - Champions: 1991–92
- Welsh Football League Premier Division - Runners-Up: 1982–83
- Welsh Football League Division Two - Runners-Up: 1970–71
- Welsh Football League Division Three - Runners-Up: 1996–97
- South Wales Alliance League Division Two - Runners-Up: 2018–19
- South Wales Alliance League Division Two - Champions: 2017–18
- Rhondda & District League Premier Division – Champions: 2016–17
- WJ Owen Cup – Winners: 2018
