= Aber Valley F.C. =

Association football club in Wales

Aber Valley
- Full name: Aber Valley Football Club
- Founded: 2000 (reformed)
- Ground: Abertridwr Park
- Manager: Ben Thornton
- League: South Wales Premier League Premier Division
- 2025–26: South Wales Premier League Premier Division, 10th of 13
Home colours

Aber Valley Football Club is a Welsh football team based in Abertridwr, Caerphilly, Wales. They play in the South Wales Premier League Premier Division.

== History ==
A club called Aber Valley played in the Welsh Football League Division Two East for the 1963–64 season, finishing tenth, and gained promotion to Division One (tier 2) at the end of the 1966–67 season after finishing third in Division Two. After one season in Division One, where they finished bottom of the league, the club left the Welsh Football League. They were South Wales Amateur League Division Two champions in the 1970–71 season.

The current club was formed in 2000 as Aber Valley YMCA by Howard Herbert and started in the Rhymney Valley League. In their first season they won two cups and finished runners-up in the league. After that season, the league merged with the Taff Ely League to form the Taff Ely & Rhymney Valley Alliance League, and Aber Valley were placed in the second division as only one Rhymney Valley League team was accepted into the top division. They won the league and a cup, earning promotion, and they did the same in the first division to gain promotion to the South Wales Amateur League. In 2003–04 they had seven points deducted which cost them the Division Two championship title. The following season they did finish as champions. They were runners-up of Division One for the 2006–07 season and won the WJ Owen Cup, which they won again in the following season.

Sometime around 2015 the club changed its name to Aber Valley. In 2015 the South Wales Amateur League merged with the South Wales Senior League, and Aber Valley became founder members of the new South Wales Alliance League. Their first season was in the Premier Division and after finishing second-bottom they were relegated to Division One. They were champions of Division One for the 2019–20 season and were promoted to the Premier Division.

== Ground ==
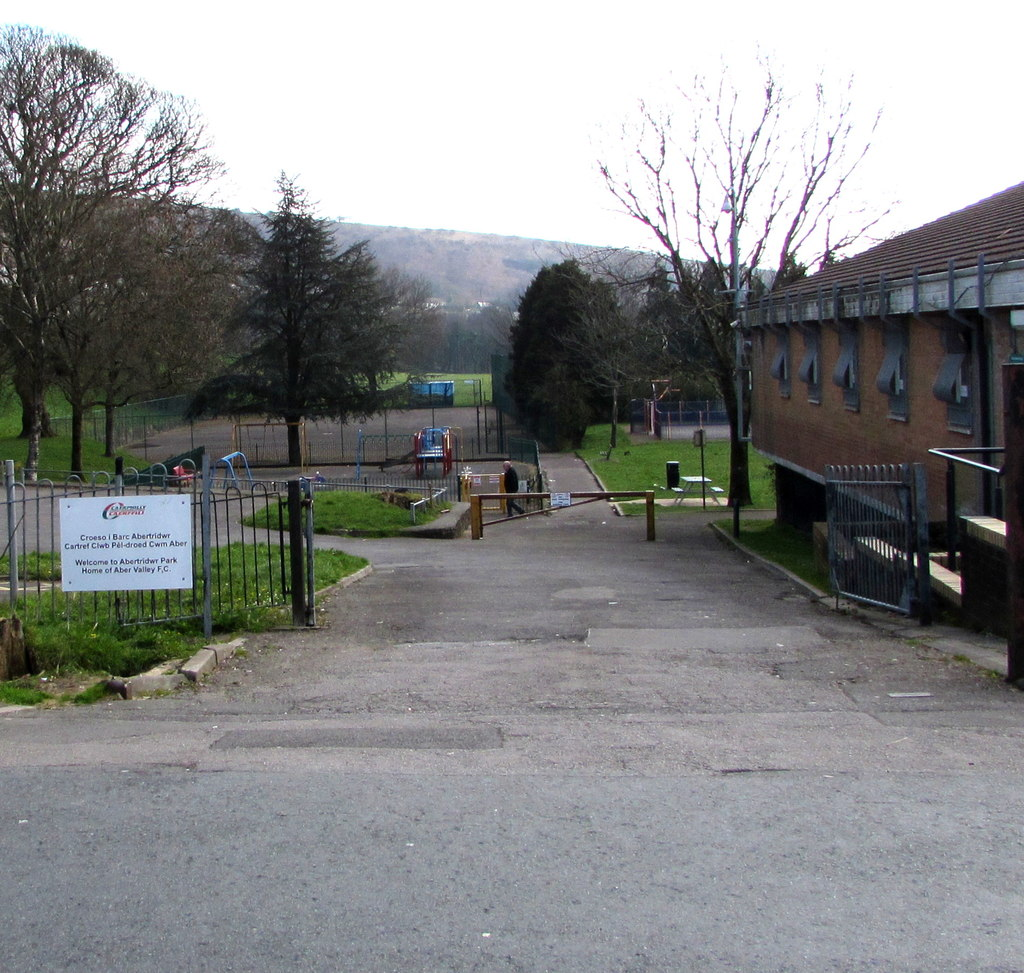
Abertridwr Park

Aber Valley play their home matches at Abertridwr Park. As of summer 2019, they also trained at Penyrheol Park during the summer months.

== Honours ==
- Welsh Football League Division Two A – Champions: 1923–24
- South Wales Alliance League Division One: – Champions: 2019–20
- South Wales Amateur League Division One: – Runners-up: 2006–07
- South Wales Amateur League Division Two: – Champions: 1970–71; 2004–05
- Taff Ely & Rhymney Valley Alliance League Premier Division: – Champions: 2002–03
- Taff Ely & Rhymney Valley Alliance League Division One: – Champions: 2001–02
- Rhymney Valley League: – Runners-up: 2000–01
- WJ Owen Cup: – Winners: 2006–07; 2007–08
