= Brecon Corinthians A.F.C. =

Association football club in Wales

Coordinates: 51°56′32″N 3°23′13″W

Brecon Corinthians
- Full name: Brecon Corinthians Association Football Club
- Nicknames: Corries, The Chisels
- Founded: 1946
- Ground: The Rich Field, Brecon
- Coach: Damien Daniels (Player/ Manager)
- League: Ardal SE League
- 2025–26: Ardal SE League, 13th of 16
Home colours	Away colours

Brecon Corinthians A.F.C. (Brecon Corries) are a Welsh football club from the town of Brecon in Powys. The club played for much of its history in the Welsh Football League, as well as spells in leagues in South and Mid Wales. They currently play in the Ardal SE League.

== History ==
The club was formed in 1946 at the Greyhound Coffee Tavern in Llanfaes and were accepted into the Mid Wales League (Southern Section). In 1947–48 they achieved a league-cup double and for the 1949–50 season they joined the Welsh Football League Division Two East Division. The club played in the Welsh Football League until the end of the 1966–67 season when they left to play in the Brecon and District League. During their first spell in the Welsh Football League their most notable achievement was winning the Welsh Football League Cup in 1962–63, beating Abergavenny Thursdays.

They re-joined the Welsh Football League for the 1974–75 season, playing in Division Two - the third tier of the Welsh football pyramid. At the end of the 1979–80 season, they finished third, gaining promotion to Division One - the second tier. At the end of the 1981–82 season the club finished as champions gaining promotion to the Premier Division, the top tier of Welsh football. For ten seasons the club played in the top level division until the mid to late 1990's saw the club relegated across a number of seasons, dropping down to tier 4 - the bottom division of the Welsh Football League, with the club leaving the league at the end of the 1998–99 season.

The club then joined the South Wales Senior League but were relegated at the end of their first season from Division One. They earned promotion from Division Two at the end of 2001–02 season but at the end of the 2004–05 season were relegated again. In summer of 2006, decisions were made to focus on using local players and former Newtown midfielder Damien Daniel took over as player-manager. The team were promoted at the end of the 2008–09 season after finishing third, but relegated at the end of the following season having finished bottom of the first division. The following season they were again promoted, this time having finished as Division Two runners-up. At the end of the 2015 season the team transferred to the new South Wales Alliance League Premier Division, at level five of the pyramid. They finished in the top six in each of the new league's opening three seasons, before finishing 9th in their final season in the South Walian league structure.

For the 2019–20 season the club moved within the Welsh football structure to central Wales - and re-joined the Mid Wales South League at tier 5 level. In a season which was curtailed due to the coronavirus pandemic, the club were champions with a 100% record of 16 wins from 16 games with 143 goals scored and just two conceded. having previously played in the South Wales Alliance League. In addition to these statistics the team recorded a 27–0 win at Knighton Town Reserves which was expunged from the record books following Knighton's withdrawal from the league. The club were promoted to the Mid Wales Football League's new East Division at tier 4 for the 2020–21 season, however the season was declared as abandoned without any games played due to the continued impact of the pandemic. Ahead of the 2021–22 season the club installed covered seating for 100 spectators, a criterion which needs to be met to play at tier 3 of the Welsh football pyramid. The club earned their second league title win in two seasons by securing the East Division title in May 2022. On 9 June 2022, it was announced that the club had been promoted to the tier 3 Ardal SE League for the 2022–23 season.

== Honours ==
- Mid Wales Football League Play-off – Winners: 2021–22
- Mid Wales League East – Champions (1): 2021–22
- Mid Wales League (Southern Section) - Champions (1): 1947–48
- Mid Wales League Cup – Winners (1): 1947–48
- Welsh League Division Two East - Champions (1): 1954–55
- Welsh Football League Cup - Winners (3): 1962–63; 1981–82; 1991–92
- Gwent Central League Division Two – Champions (1): 1978–79 (reserves)
- Gwent Central League Division Two Cup – Winners (1): 1978–79 (reserves)
- Welsh Football League Division One - Champions (1): 1981–82
- FAW Intermediate Cup – Finalists (2): 1984–85, 1992–93
- Welsh Football League Division One - Runners-up (1): 1992–93
- South Wales Senior League Division Two - Runners-up (2): 2001–02; 2010–11
- Mid Wales League (South) - Champions (1): 2019–20
- J. Emrys Morgan Cup – Winners (1): 2021–22
- Central Wales Challenge Cup – Finalists: 2021–22

== League history ==
Information in this section is courtesy of Football Club History Database and the Welsh Soccer Archive.

Season	Pyramid Tier	League	Final position
1946–47			
1947–48		Mid Wales League (Southern Section)	1st - Champions
1948–49			
1949–50	2	Welsh Football League Division Two East	12th
1950–51	2	Welsh Football League Division Two East	9th
1951–52	2	Welsh Football League Division Two East	15th
1952–53	2	Welsh Football League Division Two East	14th
1953–54	2	Welsh Football League Division Two East	4th
1954–55	2	Welsh Football League Division Two East	1st - Champions (promoted)
1955–56	1	Welsh Football League Division One	15th
1956–57	1	Welsh Football League Division One	16th
1957–58	1	Welsh Football League Division One	4th
1958–59	1	Welsh Football League Division One	14th
1959–60	1	Welsh Football League Division One	11th
1960–61	1	Welsh Football League Division One	10th
1961–62	1	Welsh Football League Division One	10th
1962–63	1	Welsh Football League Division One	5th
1963–64	1	Welsh Football League Division One	6th
1964–65 (Note: In this season Division 1 was renamed 'Premier Division', Division 2 East and West were replaced by 'Division 1' and 'Division 2' (effectively Division 2 and Division 3))	1	Welsh Football League Premier Division	15th (relegated)
1966–66	2	Welsh Football League Division One	4th
1966–67	2	Welsh Football League Division One	8th (Left/joined; Brecon and District League)
1974–75	3	Welsh Football League Division Two	14th
1975–76	3	Welsh Football League Division Two	17th
1976–77	3	Welsh Football League Division Two	13th
1977–78	3	Welsh Football League Division Two	13th
1978–79	3	Welsh Football League Division Two	7th
1979–80	3	Welsh Football League Division Two	3rd
1980–81	2	Welsh Football League Division One	8th
1981–82	2	Welsh Football League Division One	1st - Champions (promoted)
1982–83	1	Welsh Football League Premier Division	12th
1983–84 (Note: In this season The Premier Division (Division 1) was renamed 'National Division'. The 2nd tier division was renamed 'Premier Division' with the 3rd tier division named 'Division 1'.)	1	Welsh Football League National Division	10th
1984–85	1	Welsh Football League National Division	8th
1985–86	1	Welsh Football League National Division	4th
1986–87	1	Welsh Football League National Division	10th
1987–88	1	Welsh Football League National Division	12th
1988–89	1	Welsh Football League National Division	5th
1989–90	1	Welsh Football League National Division	12th
1990–91 (Note: In this season, The 2nd tier division was renamed 'Division One' with the 3rd tier division renamed 'Division Two'.)	1	Welsh Football League National Division	8th
1991–92	1	Welsh Football League National Division	14th
1992–93 (Note: In this season the League of Wales was created as the new national tier 1 league. The Welsh Football League covered South Wales and now exists at tier 2 (Division One); tier 3 (Division Two) and tier 4 (Division Three).)	2	Welsh Football League Division One	2nd - Runners-Up
1993–94	2	Welsh Football League Division One	12th
1994–95	2	Welsh Football League Division One	12th
1995–96	2	Welsh Football League Division One	16th (relegated)
1996–97	3	Welsh Football League Division Two	13th
1997–98	3	Welsh Football League Division Two	16th (relegated)
1998–99	4	Welsh Football League Division Three	17th (relegated)
1999–2000	5	South Wales Senior League Division One	16th (relegated)
2000–01	6	South Wales Senior League Division Two	10th
2001–02	6	South Wales Senior League Division Two	2nd - Runners-Up (promoted)
2002–03	5	South Wales Senior League Division One	4th
2003–04	5	South Wales Senior League Division One	12th
2004–05	5	South Wales Senior League Division One	14th (relegated)
2005–06	6	South Wales Senior League Division Two	11th
2006–07	6	South Wales Senior League Division Two	8th
2007–08	6	South Wales Senior League Division Two	7th
2008–09	6	South Wales Senior League Division Two	3rd (promoted)
2009–10	5	South Wales Senior League Division One	16th (relegated)
2010–11	6	South Wales Senior League Division Two	2nd - Runners-Up (promoted)
2011–12	5	South Wales Senior League Division One	8th
2012–13	5	South Wales Senior League Division One	7th
2013–14	5	South Wales Senior League Division One	10th
2014–15	5	South Wales Senior League Division One	6th
2015–16	5	South Wales Alliance League Premier Division	5th
2016–17	5	South Wales Alliance League Premier Division	5th
2017–18	5	South Wales Alliance League Premier Division	6th
2018–19	5	South Wales Alliance League Premier Division	9th
2019–20	5	Mid Wales South League	1st - Champions (promoted)
2020–21	4	Mid Wales Football League East Division	Season cancelled (Coronavirus pandemic)
2021–22	4	Mid Wales Football League East Division	1st - Champions (promoted)

== Former players ==
See Category:Brecon Corinthians F.C. players to see a list of notable Brecon Corries players, past and present.
