= Ynysddu Welfare F.C. =

Association football club in Wales

- Founded: 1945
- Dissolved: 14 September 2023
- Ground: Nine Mile Point Miners' Welfare Ground, Graig View, Ynysddu
- 2023–24: Gwent County League Division One (club resigned)

Ynysddu Welfare Football Club was a Welsh football team based in Ynysddu, a small village and community of the lower Sirhowy Valley in south-east Wales. Their last season was played in the Gwent Premier League Division One, which is the fifth tier of the FAW Pyramid System.

== History ==
Association Football in Ynysddu began in 1905, with the launch of Ynysddu Albion AFC. The club then changed its name to Ynysddu Crusaders AFC in 1915, and existed until the outbreak of World War Two in 1939, when it disbanded.

The two local wartime clubs, Ynysddu Celtic and Cwmfelinfach Rangers merged at the end of the war in 1945–46 to become Ynysddu Welfare AFC.

The club played in the South Wales Amateur Football League from Season 1946–47 to 2011–12, when they transferred to the Gwent County FA League for Season 2012/13 onwards.

Following the formal amalgamation of Ynysddu Welfare AFC and Crusaders Seniors AFC in 2008, the club then became Ynysddu Crusaders FC' until the summer of 2013 when the club renamed themselves Ynysddu Welfare FC.

They club were affiliated to the Gwent County Football Association. The first team played in the Gwent County FA League (which subsequently became the Gwent Premier League) and the reserve team played in the North Gwent Football League.

On 14 September 2023 the club made an official statement that the club was "coming to an end and disbanding with immediate effect".

== Honours ==
- Monmouthshire County FA Cup Winners: 1947–48
- South Wales Amateur Football League Division Two - Champions 1987-88; 2001-2002
- Gwent County FA League Division Three Champions: 2012–13.
- Gwent County FA League Division Two – Champions: 2017–18.
- Gwent County FA Amateur Cup – Winners: 2017–18.
