= Caerau F.C. =

Association football club in Wales

Caerau FC
- Full name: Caerau Football Club
- Founded: 1901
- Ground: Caerau Athletic Ground
- 2024–25: (withdrew pre-season)
Home colours	Away colours

Caerau Football Club was a Welsh football club from Caerau, near Maesteg. They last played in the Bridgend & District League. They formerly played in the Welsh Football League.

They were promoted to the Welsh Football League Division Three for the 2010–11 season from the South Wales Amateur League. In 2011–12 they gained another promotion to the Welsh Football League Division Two, but were relegated to Division Three in 2013–14. At the end of the 2018–19 season the club were relegated from the Welsh Football League and joined the South Wales Alliance League Premier Division. They were then relegated for a second successive season at the end of the 2019–20 season, dropping to the First Division for 2020–21. They subsequently took a decision to drop out of the South Wales Alliance League and moved into tier 7, playing in the Bridgend & District League Premier Division for the 2021–22 season. They finished second from the bottom of the table.

== History ==
Former Arsenal and England midfielder Paul Merson made one appearance for the club in October 2017.
