= Dinas Powys F.C. =

Association football club in Wales

Coordinates: 51°25′59.4″N 3°12′48.4″W

Dinas Powys
- Full name: Dinas Powys Football Club
- Founded: 1971
- Ground: The Murch
- Chairman: Andrew Perry
- Manager: Harry Driscoll
- League: South Wales Premier League Championship Division
- 2025–26: South Wales Premier League Championship Division, 1st of 12
Home colours	Away colours

Dinas Powys F.C. is a Welsh football club that plays in the South Wales Premier League Championship Division. They are based in Dinas Powys, near Cardiff, in South Wales. They have an academy with over 100 players.

== Current squad ==
Note: Flags indicate national team as defined under FIFA eligibility rules; some limited exceptions apply. Players may hold more than one non-FIFA nationality.

No.	Pos.	Nation	Player
—	GK	WAL	Jack Jenkins
—	DF	WAL	Nick Grist
—	DF	WAL	Lucas Murray
—	DF	WAL	Patrick Jones
—	DF	WAL	Will Thomas
—	DF	WAL	Ben Smart
—	DF	WAL	Gareth Emmanuel
—	MF	WAL	James Marr
—	MF	WAL	Ryan Garland
—	MF	WAL	Declan Andrews
—	MF	ENG	George Yianni

No.	Pos.	Nation	Player
—	MF	WAL	Matthew Leyshon
—	MF	WAL	Rory Price
—	FW	WAL	Kylan Ericksen
—	FW	WAL	Jacob Flower
—	MF	WAL	Keena Hinds
—	MF	ENG	Marcus Savage
—	FW	ENG	Jack Preston
—	FW	WAL	Isaac Follon

== Staff ==
Club Manager: (Wales) Harry Driscoll Assistant Manager: (Wales) Ben Luck

== Honours ==
=== League ===
- South Wales Premier League Championship Division – Champions: 2025–26
- Welsh Football League Division One – Runners-up: 2007–08
- Welsh Football League Division Two – Champions: 2002–03
- Welsh Football League Division Three - Runners-up: 2001–02
- South Wales Amateur League Division One - Champions: 1997–98, 1998–99, 1999–2000

=== Cups ===
- FAW Trophy - Winners: 1997-98
- Corinthian Cup – Winners: 1998–99
- Milsom & Harries Cup – Winners: 1979
