= Ynysygerwn F.C. =

Association football club in Wales

Coordinates: 51.645151°N 3.851810°W

Ynysygerwn
- Full name: Ynysygerwn Football Club
- Founded: 1981
- Ground: Llandarcy Academy of Sport
- Chairman: Barrie Davies
- Manager: Nicholas Maggs
- League: Ardal SW League
- 2024–25: Ardal SW League, 11th of 16
| Home colours | Away colours |

Ynysygerwn Football Club is a Welsh football club based in Aberdulais, situated approximately two miles from Neath town centre. The club currently competes Ardal SW League.

Ynysygerwn has three senior football sides along with a youth academy which runs teams from Under 6s to Under 18s. The first team currently play their home games at Llandarcy Academy of Sport, the training ground of the Ospreys rugby union team, while the rest of the teams play at Ynysygerwn Cricket Club. The club's president is Tottenham Hotspur and Wales player Ben Davies.

== History ==
Ynysygerwn Football Club was founded in 1981 by members of the town's cricket club as a way for the players to stay fit when the cricket season ended. The club entered the amateur Neath & District League. The club achieved promotion in 1985 and by the early 1990s had reached the First Division. In the 1991–92 season, Ynysygerwn finished First Division champions.

The team remained in the top tiers of the Neath & District League, achieving a third-placed finished in 2014. Two years later, the club won promotion to the Welsh Football League during the 2015–16 season for the first time in its history, defeating Team Swansea in a play-off match in May 2016 having finished as runners-up. The side also won the Neath & District League Cup for the first time in its history in the same season.

Wales international defender Ben Davies was named club president in the 2010s. Davies had played cricket for the club as a teenager.
