= Penrhiwceiber Rangers F.C. =

Association football club in Wales

Coordinates: 51°40′4″N 3°21′32″W

Penrhiwceiber Rangers FC
- Full name: Penrhiwceiber Rangers Football Club
- Founded: 1961
- Ground: Glasbrook Field
- Chairman: Billy Cooksley
- Manager: Dean Brown
- League: Ardal SW League
- 2025–26: Ardal SW League, 3rd of 16
| Home colours | Away colours |

Penrhiwceiber Rangers F.C are a football team based in Glasbrook Terrace, Penrhiwceiber, that competes in the Ardal SW League.

The club was previously known as Penrhiwceiber Welfare and was established in 1961 by Billy Cooksley, Tony Jones, and Chris Kerr.

== Honours ==
- South Wales Amateur League Winners: 1991–92
- Corinthian Cup Winners: 1991–92
- Welsh League Division Three Champions: 1993–94
- Welsh League Division Two Champions: 1994–95
- Welsh League Division Two Champions: 1998–99
- Welsh League Division Two Champions: 2009–10
- Welsh League Division Two Champions: 2019–20
- Ardal Leagues South West Champions: 2023–24
