= Welsh Football League =

- Founded: 1904; 122 years ago (as "Rhymney Valley League")
- Folded: 2020
- Country: Wales
- Number of clubs: 32 (16 in each division)
- Level on pyramid: 1–3 (pre-1992); 2–4 (1992–2019); 3–4 (2019–2020)
- Domestic cup(s): Welsh Cup; Welsh Football League Cup
- Last champions: Pen-y-Bont (2019–20 Welsh Football League Division One)

The Welsh Football League (also known as the Nathaniel Car Sales Welsh Football League for sponsorship reasons) was a club football league in Wales. For its final season in 2019–20 it operated at levels 3 and 4 of the Welsh football league system. Level 3 – the Welsh Football League Division One and level 4 Welsh Football League Division Two. It folded in 2020 after the Football Association of Wales took over the running of tier 3 leagues and the responsibility for tier 4 passed to regional football associations.

The Welsh Football League's history stretches back to 1904 when the competition was first formed and Aberdare were crowned first champions of a seven-team First Division. Abergavenny were champions of Division 2 and Trelewis the winners of Division 3.

== The first season in 1904–05 ==
In April 1904, the Merthyr Express newspaper reported that a new football league would be formed in addition to the South Wales League which had been in existence since 1891.

This new competition would be named the Rhymney Valley League and the reason for its creation was due to the South Wales League being overly dominated by Cardiff clubs, though the number of teams from Cardiff barely numbered more than a couple in any one season.

== Structure ==
Division One of the League operated at the second tier of the Welsh system, until 2019–20, when it was replaced at that tier by the Cymru South. It then ran at the third tier for one season in 2019–20, before the league folded.

== Former divisions ==
- Welsh Football League Division One
- Welsh Football League Division Two
- Welsh Football League Division Three
