= 2023–24 Ardal SE =

Ardal SE
- Season: 2023–24
- Champions: Trethomas Bluebirds
- Promoted: Newport City; Trethomas Bluebirds
- Relegated: Aberbargoed Buds; Hay St Marys; Lliswerry

The 2023–24 Ardal SE season (also known as the 2023–24 Floodlighting and Electrical Services Ardal SE season for sponsorship reasons) was the third season of the new third-tier southern region football in Welsh football pyramid, part of the Ardal Leagues.

The winners (Trethomas Bluebirds) were promoted to the 2024–25 Cymru South. The runners-up (Newport City) were also promoted after winning the Ardal Southern play-off. The bottom two teams (Hay St Marys and Lliswerry) and Aberbargoed Buds (who withdrew after the completion of the season) were relegated to Tier 4.

== Teams ==
The league was made up of sixteen teams; twelve teams remaining from the previous season, three teams promoted from Tier 4, and one team transferred from the 2022–23 Ardal SW.

The teams promoted from Tier 4 were Aberbargoed Buds and Abercarn United from the Gwent County League Premier Division, and Hay St Marys from the Mid Wales Football League South Division (replacing the relegated Ardal SE teams of Croesyceiliog, Monmouth Town, and RTB Ebbw Vale). Since no team was relegated from the 2022–23 Cymru South, Treharris Athletic Western were transferred from the Ardal SW (replacing the promoted Ardal SE team of Abertillery Bluebirds).

=== Stadia and locations ===
Locations of teams in the 2023–24 Ardal SE

Team	Location	Home Ground
Aberbargoed Buds	Aberbargoed	Aberbargoed Recreational Ground
Abercarn United	Abercarn	The Welfare Ground
Blaenavon Blues	Blaenavon	The Memorial Ground
Brecon Corinthians	Brecon	The Richfield
Caldicot Town	Caldicot	Jubilee Way
Chepstow Town	Chepstow	Larkfield Park
Goytre	Penperlleni	Plough Road
Hay St Marys	Hay-on-Wye	Forest Road
Lliswerry	Newport	Newport Stadium
Newport City	Newport	Newport Stadium
Risca United	Llanfabon	CCB Centre For Sporting Excellence
Tredegar Town	Tredegar	Tredegar Leisure Complex
Treharris Athletic Western	Treharris	Parc Taf Bargoed
Treowen Stars	Newbridge	Bush Park
Trethomas Bluebirds	Llanfabon	CCB Centre For Sporting Excellence
Undy Athletic	Undy	The Causeway

Source: Ardal SE Ground Information

- (Risca United and Trethomas Bluebirds groundshare, as do Lliswerry and Newport City)

== League table ==
Pos	Team	Pld	W	D	L	GF	GA	GD	Pts	Promotion, qualification or relegation
1	Trethomas Bluebirds (C, P)	30	25	3	2	100	25	+75	78	Promotion to Cymru South
2	Newport City (O, P)	30	23	2	5	97	26	+71	71	Qualification for the Ardal Southern play-off
3	Risca United	30	19	5	6	67	40	+27	62	
4	Goytre	30	19	4	7	79	44	+35	61	
5	Chepstow Town	30	16	4	10	56	49	+7	52	
6	Caldicot Town	30	14	5	11	71	55	+16	47	
7	Brecon Corinthians	30	13	6	11	77	83	−6	45	
8	Undy Athletic	30	12	4	14	65	59	+6	40	
9	Aberbargoed Buds	30	13	1	16	51	55	−4	40	Club withdrew
10	Treowen Stars	30	10	5	15	57	57	0	35	
11	Tredegar Town	30	9	6	15	43	51	−8	33	
12	Blaenavon Blues	30	8	8	14	49	58	−9	32	
13	Treharris Athletic Western	30	8	6	16	34	69	−35	30	
14	Abercarn United	30	7	5	18	48	77	−29	26	
15	Lliswerry (R)	30	7	4	19	46	70	−24	25	Relegation to Tier 4
16	Hay St Marys (R)	30	1	4	25	33	155	−122	7	Relegation to Tier 4

Source: Non League Matters
Rules for classification: 1) Points; 2) Goal difference; 3) Goals scored; 4) Matches won; 5) Play-off.
(C) Champions; (O) Play-off winners; (P) Promoted; (R) Relegated

== Results ==
Home \ Away	ABB	ACU	BLE	BRE	CLD	CHP	GYR	HSM	LLI	NPT	RIS	TDG	TAW	TOW	TTB	UND
Aberbargoed Buds	—	2–1	2–3	2–3	0–2	0–3	2–0	1–2	4–1	0–1	1–2	3–1	0–1	3–2	2–2	3–2
Abercarn United	2–1	—	2–1	4–4	3–3	1–3	4–0	3–0	3–3	0–3	1–1	1–2	2–0	2–5	0–3	2–5
Blaenavon Blues	0–3	2–1	—	4–4	1–1	3–4	2–3	12–1	2–1	0–2	2–0	2–1	0–0	1–0	1–1	1–2
Brecon Corinthians	2–3	4–1	1–1	—	2–3	4–1	1–5	5–0	5–3	1–3	4–2	2–1	2–1	3–0	0–6	3–0
Caldicot Town	1–2	6–2	4–2	1–4	—	2–3	0–2	8–0	5–1	3–1	0–1	1–0	3–0	4–3	2–3	1–1
Chepstow Town	1–0	4–1	1–0	2–0	1–1	—	0–5	4–1	3–0	1–3	2–3	4–1	3–1	1–0	0–2	0–2
Goytre	4–1	2–1	0–0	6–1	2–1	1–1	—	7–1	3–0	0–5	1–2	2–0	8–2	1–1	3–1	3–3
Hay St Marys	2–6	2–2	3–3	3–3	3–4	2–3	2–5	—	3–5	0–7	1–3	1–4	1–2	2–5	0–12	0–5
Lliswerry	3–2	1–0	4–0	6–0	0–2	0–0	1–2	3–0	—	0–3	1–2	1–3	2–2	3–2	1–3	1–1
Newport City	3–0	7–0	6–0	1–2	3–1	3–1	3–2	14–0	3–0	—	1–1	2–0	7–2	2–2	0–1	2–0
Risca United	4–1	4–1	5–3	4–0	2–2	2–2	2–1	3–1	4–3	1–2	—	3–0	5–0	1–0	0–5	2–0
Tredegar Town	0–1	2–3	1–1	2–2	2–0	3–1	1–2	4–0	2–0	2–4	1–0	—	1–1	1–1	0–1	0–3
Treharris Athletic Western	3–2	2–1	1–0	1–5	1–2	0–2	1–2	1–1	3–1	2–0	0–2	3–3	—	0–0	0–3	2–1
Treowen Stars	1–3	1–0	0–2	5–3	2–4	2–4	2–3	7–1	2–1	1–0	0–2	2–2	2–1	—	0–3	3–1
Trethomas Bluebirds	3–0	2–1	2–1	7–2	4–2	4–0	2–1	4–0	6–0	2–4	2–2	2–0	4–1	2–1	—	6–0
Undy Athletic	0–1	2–3	2–0	5–5	4–2	2–1	1–3	10–0	1–0	1–3	3–2	2–3	4–0	1–5	1–2	—

Source: Non League Matters
Legend: Blue = home team win; Yellow = draw; Red = away team win.
