= Leon Jeanne =

Welsh footballer

Personal information
- Full name: Leon Charles Jeanne
- Date of birth: 17 November 1980 (age 45)
- Place of birth: Cardiff, Wales
- Position: Midfielder

Team information
- Current team: Cwmbrân Town

Youth career
- Arsenal
- Queens Park Rangers

Senior career*
Years	Team	Apps	(Gls)
1997–2001	Queens Park Rangers	12	(0)
2001–2002	Cardiff City	2	(0)
2002	Havant & Waterlooville	0	(0)
2002	Newport County	2	(0)
2002	Port Talbot	7	(2)
2003	Barry Town	12	(3)
2003	Dinas Powys		
2003–2004	Barry Town	3	(1)
2006	Merthyr Tydfil		
2007–2008	Maesteg Park		
2008–2009	Carpenters Arms	8	
2009	Weston-super-Mare	2	(0)
2009	→ Maesteg Park (loan)	0	(0)
2010	Cardiff Corinthians	9	(1)
2010–2011	Bath City	3	(0)
2010–2011	Cinderford Town (dual registration)	?	(?)
2011–2012	Afan Lido	1	(0)
2012	Carmarthen Town	0	(0)
2012–2013	Bridgend Street		
2013–?	Weston-super-Mare		
2015	Port Talbot Town	6	(0)
2016	Paulton Rovers		
2016	Evesham United	0	(0)
2016–2017	Taffs Well		
2018	Goytre United		
?–2020	Bridgend Street		
2023–2024	Prescoed	5	(10)
2024	Splott Albion	4	(2)
2025–2026	Bridgend Street	6	(3)
2026	Trethomas Bluebirds	5	(1)
2026–	Cwmbrân Town	3	(1)

International career^{‡}
1998–2000	Wales U21	7	(1)
- * Club domestic league appearances and goals as of 08:34, 12 October 2026 (UTC) ‡ National team caps and goals as of 17:37, 5 October 2026 (UTC)

Leon Charles Jeanne (born 17 November 1980) is a Welsh former professional footballer who currently plays for Cwmbrân Town. He began his career with Queens Park Rangers before joining his hometown team Cardiff City. However, he suffered from drug and alcohol addiction and was given a two-year suspended ban by the Football Association of Wales after testing positive for a class A drug. Continued disciplinary problems eventually led to his release from Cardiff.

== Early life ==
Jeanne was born in Cardiff and grew up in the Llanrumney area of the city. He attended Llanrumney High School.

== Career ==
=== Football League ===
A talented winger, Jeanne was spotted at the age of ten by Arsenal scout Eddie Prenderville. He spent time with the London-based club as a schoolboy before joining Queens Park Rangers on a YTS scheme at the age of thirteen. He made his debut in February 1999 against Watford, but problems began to arise nearly as soon as he became a professional when he disappeared for over a week when he was meant to be reporting for Wales under-21 duty. However, manager Gerry Francis revealed that it was not the first time the youngster had gone missing, stating "We've covered up for Leon enough now. This is not a one off." Francis also commented that Jeanne was on his last chance at the club after being charged for drink-driving and threatening behaivour towards police officers the previous year.

He left QPR in 2001 to sign for his hometown club Cardiff City in the hope of ending his disciplinary problems. The transfer was arranged by Jeanne's agent John Fashanu who had worked with Cardiff chairman Sam Hammam at his former club Wimbledon and described how Hammam had been a positive influence over him and hoped that he could do the same for Jeanne. However, just weeks after joining, he tested positive for a class A drug and was handed a two-year suspended sentence by the Football Association of Wales. The FAW also stipulated that Jeanne should undergo an education programme to help him learn to read and write and find a family to live with, eventually moving into the home of former Cardiff player Ronnie Bird.

In January 2002, he was named in the starting line-up for a 3–0 victory over Newtown in the FAW Premier Cup, scoring his side's first goal of the match with a header. However, he was substituted in the second half by manager Alan Cork for "showboating". He was named as an unused substitute for a league match against Wycombe Wanderers in but, less than a month later, Jeanne was admitted to the Priory Hospital in an attempt to overcome an alcohol problem. Cardiff manager Cork stated his belief that Jeanne had a "big problem" with alcohol and that he kept a breathalyzer in his office and had once taken Jeanne to a local Alcoholics Anonymous meeting. In May 2002 Jeanne was selected for random drugs testing and sent his sample away but the results came back only to show that the sample he had submitted was not urine. He refused to provide a second sample which led to Cardiff terminating his contract and he left the club. On the morning of the drugs test, Jeanne had agreed a new contract with the club but this was revoked following the incident.

=== Non-league ===
After his release from Cardiff he attempted a comeback with Havant & Waterlooville in a pre-season friendly against League of Wales side Barry Town but was withdrawn from playing after officials at Barry questioned if he was allowed to play at which point it was revealed that he was currently banned from playing football. He was allowed to resume playing a short while later and enjoyed a prosperous spell at Port Talbot Town but yet again he was involved in a scandal. In September 2002 he was arrested, along with two other men, on suspicion of dealing class A drugs. During the court case he revealed that he used to be addicted to cocaine. Eventually he and the other two men were cleared of all charges.

After the case ended he returned to football with Newport County followed by spells at Dinas Powys and Barry Town. After a spell playing for Maesteg Park, Jeanne joined amateur side Carpenters Arms. On 7 July 2009, Jeanne was arrested on suspicion of money-laundering after a police raid on his home.

Jeanne featured in two pre-season friendlies for Conference South side Weston-super-Mare on 9 and 11 July before signing on non-contract terms, making his debut on the opening day of the season in a defeat to Staines Town. However, he was released the following month due to a lack of fitness.

In November 2010, Jeanne left Welsh League side Cardiff Corinthians, and signed for Conference National side Bath City on a non-contract pay-as-you-play basis. Jeanne also signed on for Cinderford Town of the Southern League South & West Division on dual registration and spent the majority of the 2010–11 season with Cinderford.

In June 2011, Jeanne joined Championship side Brighton & Hove Albion for pre-season training in a bid to earn a contract and play football at a high level once more. He started the 2011–12 season playing for Welsh Premier League side Afan Lido but left before the start of the 2012–13 season to join Carmarthen Town.

In the second half of the 2015–16 season, Jeanne played for Paulton Rovers. In July 2016 he went on trial with Evesham United and in August he signed for the club. He made 5 substitute appearances for Evesham, none in the league, and later in the 2016–17 season he played for Taffs Well. In 2018 he was playing for Goytre United. He subsequently joined Bridgend Street.

He played for prison club Prescoed in the Gwent Central League Division Two during the 2023–24 and 2024–25 seasons and then also played for Splott Albion in the Cardiff & District League in the 2024–25 season.

In August 2025, Jeanne signed for Bridgend Street for a third spell at the club. In July 2026, Jeanne signed for Cymru South side Trethomas Bluebirds.

In September 2026 he signed for Cwmbrân Town.

== Honours ==
Cardiff City

- FAW Premier Cup winner: 2001–02

== Legal issues ==
In May 2015 Jeanne was sentenced to 30 months in prison for conspiring to supply cocaine, heroin and cannabis. He was part of a drug gang operating in Gloucester and surrounding cities and areas selling crack cocaine and heroin. He was responsible for the Cardiff side of the gang's business operation. Judge Ford told him: "You are a great disappointment to many people. You wasted your talent and turned from an honest, athletic man to a common criminal. You've been ruined by drugs. References show you have the capacity for reform."

In June 2017, Jeanne and his 19-year-old son Tremaine were convicted after the latter had an armed fight with another man in Llanrumney the previous November. Jeanne admitted threats and received 180 hours of unpaid work, while his son received eight months in detention for affray and possession of an offensive weapon, concurrent with his three-year sentence for possessing crack cocaine with intent to supply. The third man received six months in prison for affray.

In July 2019, Jeanne was convicted of dangerous driving after damaging another car while fleeing from the police at 100 miles per hour. He was given an eight-month prison sentence suspended for 18 months, and 12 weeks of curfew. In September, a warrant was issued for his arrest due to breaches of curfew.

His son, Rafel, was killed, along with two other passengers in March 2023 in Cardiff when a car which Rafel was driving crashed. The victims and two survivors were not discovered until 46 hours later. The occupants of the car had been drinking and inhalling nitrous oxide before the accident. Jeanne attended his son's funeral in handcuffs.

In 2024 he was released from prison having served five and a half years. In January 2025 it was reported that the police had again issued Jeanne a recall to prison notice, although they did not specify what for.

In 2024 his son Tremaine was involved in a car chase when drugs were thrown from a car he was driving and in August 2026 Tremaine was arrested by South Wales Police in relation to a case in Thailand where children were arrested. Tremaine has been charged with conspiring to fraudulently evade a prohibition on the importation of a class B drug and four counts of conspiring to arrange or facilitate the travel of another person with a view to exploitation.
