= Cardiff Combination League =

Football league in South Wales

- Founded: 10 August 1939
- Country: Wales
- Number of clubs: 39
- Level on pyramid: 7–8
- Promotion to: South Wales Premier League
- Current champions: Llanishen (2025–26)
- Most championships: Caerau (Ely) 10
- Website: https://ccfl.leaguerepublic.com/
- Current: 2026–27

The Cardiff Combination Football League is a football league covering the city of Cardiff and surrounding areas in South Wales. The leagues are at the seventh and eighth levels of the Welsh football league system.

The most successful club in the league's history is Caerau (Ely), with ten top division titles.

On 10 November 2016 it became the first local league to broadcast a live draw, doing so for its Milsom Harries Cup. In 2018 a match between Aberystwyth Exiles and Cathays Conservatives (won 4–1 by Cathays) was attended by John Hartson and Robbie Savage. They were there as part of the filming for the BT Sport Pub Cup, where the Exiles were set to represent the Four Elms pub in Roath.

== Divisions ==
The league is composed of two divisions. There are also two Reserve divisions - a Reserve Premier and a Reserve First.

=== Member clubs 2026–27 ===
==== Premier Division ====
- AFC Rumney (combination team)
- Aberystwyth Exiles
- CPD Treganna
- Caerau (Ely) (community)
- Fairwater
- K & H Forever Young
- North Cardiff Cosmos
- Pontprennau Pumas
- Radyr Rangers
- Tiger Bay

==== First Division ====
- Butetown
- CF Dragons
- Cardiff Crusaders
- Cardiff Town
- Cathays United
- Earlswood Rangers
- Lisvane Pathers
- Pentwyn Dynamos
- Roath Park Rangers
- Splott Albion OB
- Thornhill AFC
- Tremorfa
- Wanderers

==== Reserve Premier Division ====
- AFC Rumney (reserves)
- AFC Whitchurch (combination)
- Aberystwyth Exiles (reserves)
- Bridgend Street (reserves)
- CPD Treganna (reserves)
- K & H Forever Young (reserves)
- Llanishen (reserves)
- Pontprennau Pumas (reserves)

==== Reserve First Division ====
- Caerau (Ely) (community reserves)
- Cardiff Cosmopolitan (reserves)
- Cardiff Draconians (reserves)
- Cardiff Hibernian (reserves)
- Pentwyn Dynamos (reserves)
- Radyr Rangers (reserves)
- St Mellons (reserves)
- Wanderers (reserves)

== Promotion and relegation ==
Promotion from the Premier Division is possible to the lowest tier of the South Wales Premier League, with the champion of the league playing the other tier 7 champions from the South Wales regional leagues via play-off games to determine promotion.

== Champions - Top Division ==
The top division has been called the Senior Division or Premier Division throughout its history. A full set of the champions can be found below.

=== 1940s ===
- 1940–41: Fairoak
- 1941–42: Grange Albion
- 1942–43: No competition
- 1943–44: No competition
- 1944–45: No competition
- 1945–46: Grange Albion
- 1946–47: A – Cardiff City Colts; B – Cogan British Legion
- 1947–48: Fairoak
- 1948–49: Fairoak
- 1949–50: Fairoak

=== 1950s ===
- 1950–51: Fairoak
- 1951–52: Cogan
- 1952–53: Cogan
- 1953–54: Fairoak
- 1954–55: Roath Rangers
- 1955–56: Roath Rangers
- 1956–57: Roath Rangers
- 1957–58: The Nomads
- 1958–59: Roath Rangers
- 1959–60: Roath Rangers

=== 1960s ===
- 1960–61: Roath Rangers
- 1961–62: The Nomads
- 1962–63: Caerau (Ely)
- 1963–64: Bell Rangers
- 1964–65: Roath Rangers
- 1965–66: Roath Rangers
- 1966–67: Roath Rangers
- 1967–68: Cardiff Draconians
- 1968–69: Gabalfa Grasshoppers
- 1969–70: Ely Rangers

=== 1970s ===
- 1970–71: Ely Rangers
- 1971–72: Cardiff Draconians
- 1972–73: Caerau (Ely)
- 1973–74: Cardiff Draconians
- 1974–75: Caerau (Ely)
- 1975–76: Ely Rangers
- 1976–77: Caerau (Ely)
- 1977–78: Ely Rangers
- 1978–79: Ely Rangers
- 1979–80: Cardiff Draconians

=== 1980s ===
- 1980–81: Anthony's
- 1981–82: Home Guard (Ely)
- 1982–83: Caerau (Ely)
- 1983–84: Caerau (Ely)
- 1984–85: Anthony's
- 1985–86: Caerau (Ely)
- 1986–87: Caerau (Ely)
- 1987–88: Fairoak
- 1988–89: Caerau (Ely)
- 1989–90: Caerau (Ely)

=== 1990s ===
- 1990–91: Whitchurch Hospital Grasshoppers
- 1991–92: Gabalfa Draconians
- 1992–93: Gabalfa Draconians
- 1993–94: Whitchurch
- 1994–95: Butetown YC
- 1995–96: Butetown YC
- 1996–97: Gabalfa Draconians
- 1997–98: Ely West End
- 1998–99: Gabalfa Draconians
- 1999–2000: Cavalier

=== 2000s ===
- 2000–01: AFC St Mellons
- 2001–02: Heath Park United
- 2002–03: AFC Butetown
- 2003–04: Avenue Hotspur
- 2004–05: AFC Butetown
- 2005–06: Baybridge
- 2006–07: Avenue Hotspur
- 2007–08: Thornhill United
- 2008–09: Adamsdown Athletic
- 2009–10: STM Sports (promoted to the South Wales Amateur League)

=== 2010s ===
- 2010–11: Cardiff Hibernian (promoted to the South Wales Amateur League)
- 2011–12: RAFA
- 2012–13: Avenue Hotspur
- 2013–14: FC Zenith
- 2014–15: STM Sports Old Boys
- 2015–16: Thornhill
- 2016–17: STM Sports Old Boys
- 2017–18: STM Sports Old Boys (promoted to SWAL through play-off finals)
- 2018–19: Fairwater
- 2019–20: Fairwater

=== 2020s ===
- 2020–21: Not contested - Covid 19 pandemic
- 2021–22: Fairwater (promoted to SWAL through play-off finals)
- 2022–23: Cardiff Hibernian
- 2023–24: Cardiff Hibernian
- 2024–25: Cardiff Hibernian (promoted to SWPL)
- 2025–26: Llanishen (promoted to SWPL)

== Number of top flight championships by club ==
- Caerau (Ely) – 10 titles
- Roath Rangers – 9 titles
- Cardiff Draconians – 8 titles (4 as Gabalfa Draconians)
- Fairoak – 7 titles
- Ely Rangers – 5 titles
- Cardiff Hibernian – 4 titles
- Avenue Hotspur – 3 titles
- Fairwater – 3 titles
- STM Sports Old Boys – 3 titles
- AFC Butetown – 2 titles
- Anthony's – 2 titles
- Butetown YC – 2 titles
- Cogan – 2 titles
- Grange Albion – 2 titles
- The Nomads – 2 titles
- Adamsdown Athletic – 1 title
- AFC St Mellons – 1 title
- Baybridge – 1 title
- Bell Rangers – 1 title
- Cardiff City Colts – 1 title
- Cavalier – 1 title
- Cogan British Legion – 1 title
- Ely West End – 1 title
- Gabalfa Grasshoppers - 1 title
- Heath Park Avenue – 1 title
- Home Guard (Ely) – 1 title
- FC Zenith – 1 title
- Llanishen – 1 title
- RAFA – 1 title
- STM Sports – 1 title
- Thornhill – 1 title
- Thornhill United – 1 title
- Whitchurch – 1 title
- Whitchurch Hospital Grasshoppers – 1 title
