= 2024–25 Cymru South =

Fourth season of the second-tier Southern Welsh football

Cymru South
- Season: 2024–25
- Champions: Llanelli Town (1st title)
- Promoted: Llanelli Town
- Relegated: Goytre United; Penrhiwceiber Rangers; Taff's Well
- Matches: 240
- Goals: 736 (3.07 per match)
- Top goalscorer: Liam Eason (27 goals)
- Biggest home win: Llanelli Town 7–1 Goytre United (22 November 2024)
- Biggest away win: Penrhiwceiber Rangers 1–5 Goytre United (10 August 2024)/Taff's Well 3–7 Carmarthen Town (21 February 2025)/Penrhiwceiber Rangers 0–4 Caerau Ely (26 December 2024)
- Highest scoring: Taff's Well 3–7 Carmarthen Town (21 February 2025)/Cwmbran Celtic 4–6 Trethomas Bluebirds (30 November 2024)/Carmarthen Town 5–5 Penrhiwceiber Rangers (12 April 2025 2024)
- Longest winning run: 7 – Newport City (1 March 2025–present)
- Longest unbeaten run: 14 – Llanelli Town (11 October 2024-21 February 2025)
- Longest winless run: 16 – Taff's Well (22 November 2024–present)
- Longest losing run: 7 – Taff's Well (30 November 2024–15 February 2025)
- Highest attendance: 881 - Trefelin BGC 1–1 Afan Lido (30 December 2024)
- Lowest attendance: 26 - Cambrian United 5–0 Cwmbran Celtic (28 September 2024)
- Average attendance: 200

The 2024–25 Cymru South season (also known as the 2024–25 JD Cymru South season for sponsorship reasons) was the fifth season of the second-tier Southern region football in Welsh football pyramid.

== Teams ==
The league consisted of 16 clubs; 12 clubs remaining from the previous season, 1 club relegated from the Cymru Premier, and 3 clubs promoted from the Ardal Leagues.

Trethomas Bluebirds and Penrhiwceiber Rangers were promoted as champions of the 2023–24 Ardal SE and 2023–24 Ardal SW respectively, while Ardal SE runners-up Newport City defeated Ardal SW runners-up Cefn Cribwr in the Ardal Southern play-off to also earn promotion. The three promoted teams replaced the three relegated 2023–24 Cymru South teams (Abergavenny Town, Abertillery Bluebirds, and Pontardawe Town). Pontypridd United were relegated from the 2023–24 Cymru Premier, replacing the promoted 2023–24 Cymru South winners (Briton Ferry Llansawel).

=== Stadia and Locations ===
Locations of the 2024–25 Cymru South teams

Team	Home City	Home Ground	Capacity
Afan Lido	Aberavon, Port Talbot	Marston's Stadium	3,000
Ammanford	Ammanford	Recreation Ground	1,000
Baglan Dragons	Baglan, Port Talbot	Evans Bevan Playing Field	1,000
Cambrian United	Clydach Vale	King George V New Field	1,000
Caerau (Ely)	Ely, Cardiff	Cwrt-yr-Ala Road	1,000
Carmarthen Town	Carmarthen	Richmond Park	2,500
Cwmbran Celtic	Cwmbran	Celtic Park	1,000
Goytre United	Goytre, Port Talbot	Glenhafod Park Stadium	1,500
Llanelli Town	Llanelli	Stebonheath Park	3,700
Llantwit Major	Llantwit Major	Windmill Ground	1,000
Newport City	Newport	Newport Stadium	5,058
Penrhiwceiber Rangers	Penrhiwceiber	Glasbrook Field	1,000
Pontypridd United	Treforest	USW Sport Park	1,000
Taff's Well	Taff's Well	Rhiw'r Ddar	2,930
Trefelin BGC	Velindre, Port Talbot	Ynys Park	1,000
Trethomas Bluebirds	Ystrad Mynach	CCB Centre for Sporting Excellence	1,000

== Personnel and kits ==
Team	Head coach	Captain	Kit manufacturer	Front shirt sponsor
Afan Lido	(Wales) Garry Taylor	(Wales) Liam Griffiths	Macron	Shrimpton Developments
Ammanford	(Wales) Wyn Thomas	(Wales) Morgan Clarke	Joma	Morganstone
Baglan Dragons	(Wales) Carl Clement	(Wales) Lewis Holmes	Joma	Pinetree Car Superstore
Caerau (Ely)	(Wales) Dean Wheeler	(Wales) Jack Ashford	Classic Sportswear	Mr Homes
Cambrian United	(Wales) Liam Williams	(Wales) Kyle Jones	Joma	Pinetree Car Superstore
Carmarthen Town	(Wales) Mark Aizlewood	(Wales) Noah Daley	Kappa	A.T.B. Davies & Son
Cwmbran Celtic	(Wales) Simon Berry	(Wales) Andrew Larcombe	Hummel	Avondale Motor Park
Goytre United	(Wales) Stephen Kelleher	(Wales) Keane Watts	Joma	CXJ Building Sponsors
Llanelli Town	(Wales) Lee John	(Wales) Josef Hopkins	Joma	First Choice Flooring Wales
Llantwit Major	(Wales) Ben Stait	(Wales) Rhys Llewelyn	Tor Sports	Compact Cars & Vans
Newport City	(Wales) Sam Houldsworth	(Wales) Luke Cooper	VX3	Unseen Caffeine
Penrhiwceiber Rangers	(Wales) Dean Brown	(Wales) Warren Jones	Macron	W.A.G. Scaffolding Service
Pontypridd United	(Wales) Andrew Whittington	(Wales) Jarrad Wright	Joma	UPVCDIRECT.CO.UK
Taff's Well	(Wales) Josh Anderson	(United States) Vaughn Fowler	Macron	Gentles Construction
Trefelin BGC	(Wales) Andy Hill	(Wales) Jordan Davies	Macron	
Trethomas Bluebirds	(England) Mark Dunford	(Wales) James Saddler	VX3	Fernleigh Design

=== Managerial changes ===
Team	Outgoing manager	Manner of departure	Date of vacancy	Position in table	Incoming manager	Date of appointment
Cwmbran Celtic	(Wales) James Kinsella	Resigned	7 March 2024^{1}	Pre-season	(Wales) Simon Berry	11 May 2024
Ammanford	(Wales) Gruff Harrison	Resigned	14 August 2024	15th	(Wales) Wyn Thomas	22 August 2024
Afan Lido	(Wales) Paul Evans	Mutual consent	5 October 2024	15th	(Wales) Garry Taylor	10 October 2024
Taff's Well	(Wales) Geza Hajgato/ (Wales) Nathan Cotterall	Sacked	13 October 2024	15th	(Wales) Josh Anderson	30 October 2024
Pontypridd United	(Wales) Gavin Allen	Resigned	30 October 2024	2nd	(Wales) Andrew Whittington	7 November 2024
Goytre United	(Wales) Laurie Marsh	Resigned	3 November 2024	12th	(Wales) Stephen Kelleher	5 January 2025

1. Kinsella's resignation was announced during the 2023–24 season, but did not come into effect until the end of the season.

== League table ==
Pos	Team	Pld	W	D	L	GF	GA	GD	Pts	Promotion or relegation
1	Llanelli Town (C, P)	30	18	10	2	64	25	+39	64	Promotion to the Cymru Premier
2	Trethomas Bluebirds	30	17	8	5	53	33	+20	59	
3	Newport City	30	16	6	8	50	32	+18	54	
4	Trefelin BGC	30	15	8	7	54	41	+13	53	
5	Pontypridd United	30	16	5	9	54	44	+10	53	
6	Cambrian United	30	13	11	6	50	38	+12	47 (Note: Cambrian United were deducted three points for fielding an ineligible player against Pontypridd United on 1 January 2025.)	
7	Carmarthen Town	30	12	9	9	55	44	+11	45	
8	Baglan Dragons	30	11	10	9	44	34	+10	43	
9	Llantwit Major	30	11	10	9	37	34	+3	43	
10	Ammanford	30	11	3	16	47	50	−3	36	
11	Afan Lido	30	8	10	12	44	51	−7	34	
12	Caerau (Ely)	30	9	5	16	42	43	−1	32	
13	Cwmbran Celtic	30	9	3	18	39	62	−23	30	
14	Penrhiwceiber Rangers (R)	30	7	7	16	30	57	−27	28	Relegation to the Ardal SW
15	Goytre United (R)	30	6	5	19	41	72	−31	23	Relegation to the Ardal SW
16	Taff's Well (R)	30	3	6	21	32	76	−44	15	Relegation to the Ardal SW

Source: Cymru South
Rules for classification: 1) Points; 2) Goal difference; 3) Goals scored; 4) Matches won; 5) Play-off.
(C) Champions; (P) Promoted; (R) Relegated

== Results ==
Teams play each other twice on a home and away basis.

Home \ Away	AFL	AMM	BGD	CRU	CBU	CAR	CBC	GOU	LLI	LTM	NPT	PNR	PON	TAW	TRE	TTB
Afan Lido	—	2–1	0–3	2–2	1–2	3–3	4–1	4–1	0–1	1–3	1–1	2–0	2–0	1–2	0–0	1–0
Ammanford	5–1	—	1–1	0–2	1–0	2–3	6–2	3–1	0–2	1–2	1–2	4–1	2–3	3–0	1–2	2–3
Baglan Dragons	1–1	0–2	—	2–1	4–1	1–1	4–3	6–1	2–2	0–0	2–2	1–2	2–2	1–1	1–2	2–0
Caerau (Ely)	3–0	2–1	2–1	—	0–2	2–2	1–2	1–1	1–2	2–4	1–2	0–1	0–1	3–1	2–0	2–2
Cambrian United	0–0	3–2	0–0	2–2	—	2–1	5–0	2–0	1–1	1–0	1–1	1–0	3–3	3–0	1–3	0–1
Carmarthen Town	2–2	3–0	3–2	2–0	4–1	—	3–1	1–2	1–1	0–1	1–0	5–5	0–1	2–0	1–1	2–0
Cwmbran Celtic	1–1	4–0	0–2	3–2	1–3	1–0	—	2–1	0–1	1–0	0–1	1–1	2–1	2–2	1–3	4–6
Goytre United	0–3	1–2	0–1	0–2	2–2	3–1	2–3	—	2–4	0–1	0–3	2–1	3–3	2–0	1–3	1–2
Llanelli Town	1–1	0–1	2–0	3–1	1–1	1–1	3–1	7–1	—	2–0	2–3	3–0	3–0	5–0	3–0	1–1
Llantwit Major	2–0	1–0	0–1	1–0	2–2	0–2	2–1	1–1	2–2	—	1–1	4–2	1–1	4–1	0–0	0–1
Newport City	5–1	3–1	1–0	3–1	0–0	3–0	2–0	0–1	1–2	2–1	—	1–3	0–1	2–2	1–0	1–2
Penrhiwceiber Rangers	3–2	1–1	0–0	0–4	0–2	0–0	0–1	1–5	0–1	1–1	1–2	—	0–2	1–0	1–3	0–0
Pontypridd United	3–2	3–0	1–0	1–0	1–3	1–3	2–0	3–0	1–2	1–1	0–2	4–1	—	3–0	4–2	2–3
Taff's Well	1–3	1–2	1–3	0–3	2–4	3–7	2–1	4–4	1–1	3–0	0–1	1–2	1–3	—	3–3	0–2
Trefelin BGC	1–1	0–1	2–0	1–0	5–2	2–1	1–0	3–2	1–1	3–1	4–3	1–2	2–3	2–0	—	2–2
Trethomas Bluebirds	3–2	1–1	0–1	1–0	0–0	3–0	1–0	3–1	1–4	1–1	2–1	3–0	4–0	3–0	2–2	—

Source: Cymru South Match Results
Legend: Blue = home team win; Yellow = draw; Red = away team win.
