= SWFA Intermediate Cup =

Regional knock-out competition for clubs

- Founded: 1891
- Region: Wales
- Most championships: Caerau (Ely)/ Guest Keen/ Treharris (5 titles each)

The South Wales Intermediate Cup is the regional knock-out competition for clubs beneath the umbrella of the South Wales Football Association, at the level of Tier 4 and below of the Welsh Football Pyramid in South Wales.

It was last played in the 2021–22 season.

== History ==
The cup was originally called the South Wales & Monmouthshire Amateur Cup, run by the South Wales and Monmouthshire Football Association until after the 1967–68 season.

== Previous winners ==
Information sourced from the South Wales Football Association website.

=== 1890s ===
- 1891–92: – Treharris
- 1892–93: – Cardiff
- 1893–94: – Rogerstone
- 1894–95: – Builth Rangers
- 1895–96: – Treharris Rangers
- 1896–97: – Porth
- 1897–98: – Llandrindod Wells
- 1898–99: – Milford Haven
- 1899–1900: – Rogerstone

=== 1900s ===
- 1900–01: – Gadlys Rovers
- 1901–02: – Treharris
- 1902–03: – Cardiff Albions
- 1903–04: – Milford Haven
- 1904–05: – Pontlottyn
- 1905–06: – Barry Dock Albion
- 1906–07: – 2nd Wiltshire Regiment
- 1907–08: – Llanfaes Brigade
- 1908–09: – Troedyrhiw Stars
- 1909–10: – High Cross Stars Rogerstone

=== 1910s ===
- 1910–11: – Mond Nickel Works
- 1911–12: – Aberaman Athletic & Nelson
- 1912–13: – Aberaman Athletic
- 1913–14: – Barry ‘A’
- 1914–15: – No competition - World War One
- 1915–16: – No competition - World War One
- 1916–17: – No competition - World War One
- 1917–18: – No competition - World War One
- 1918–19: – No competition - World War One
- 1919–20: – Troedyrhiw Stars

=== 1920s ===
- 1920–21: – Treharris Athletic
- 1921–22: – Abercynon
- 1922–23: – Cardiff Corinthians reserves
- 1923–24: – Merthyr Vale
- 1924–25: – Wattstown
- 1925–26: – Wattstown
- 1926–27: – Dowlais Town
- 1927–28: – Merthyr Vale Rechabites
- 1928–29: – Swansea ‘A’
- 1929–30: – Ranks Athletic

=== 1930s ===
- 1930–31: – Treorchy Juniors
- 1931–32: – Treharris Athletic
- 1932–33: – Treorchy Juniors
- 1933–34: – Treharris Athletic
- 1934–35: – Caerphilly United
- 1935–36: – Caerphilly United
- 1936–37: – Llwynypia Colliery
- 1937–38: – Swansea Nomads
- 1938–39: – Llwynypia Colliery
- 1939–40: – No competition

=== 1940s ===
- 1940–41: – No competition
- 1941–42: – No competition
- 1942–43: – No competition
- 1943–44: – 32 MU RAF
- 1944–45: – Abercynon Athletic
- 1945–46: – Bargoed United
- 1946–47: – Cwmbach Royal Stars
- 1947–48: – Hirwaun Welfare
- 1948–49: – Brynna United
- 1949–50: – Grange Albion

=== 1950s ===
- 1950–51: – Fleur-de-Lys Welfare
- 1951–52: – Cilfynydd Welfare
- 1952–53: – GKB & N (Cardiff)
- 1953–54: – Hirwaun Welfare
- 1954–55: – Penarth Town
- 1955–56: – Guest Keen (Cardiff)
- 1956–57: – Steel Company of Wales
- 1957–58: – Taffs Well
- 1958–59: – Cwmbach Sports
- 1959–60: – Guest Keen (Cardiff)

=== 1960s ===
- 1960–61: – Cwm Welfare
- 1961–62: – Guest Keen (Cardiff)
- 1962–63: – Tynte Rovers
- 1963–64: – Cardiff Cosmos
- 1964–65: – Cardiff Cosmos
- 1965–66: – St Patricks
- 1966–67: – Swansea Nomads
- 1967–68: – Guest Keen (Cardiff)
- 1968–69: – Swansea Nomads
- 1969–70: – Cambrian United

=== 1970s ===
- 1970–71: – Ynyscynon Athletic
- 1971–72: – Cambrian United
- 1972–73: – Abercwmboi Athletic
- 1973–74: – Llanishen
- 1974–75: – Taffs Well
- 1975–76: – Barry Plastics
- 1976–77: – Taffs Well
- 1977–78: – Cardiff Cosmos
- 1978–79: – Ely Rangers
- 1979–80: – Anthonys

=== 1980s ===
- 1980–81: – Ely Rangers
- 1981–82: – Llantwit Fardre
- 1982–83: – Seaview
- 1983–84: – Bridgend Street
- 1984–85: – Caerau (Ely)
- 1985–86: – Llantwit Fardre
- 1986–87: – Baglan BC
- 1987–88: – Grange Albion
- 1988–89: – Hoover Sports
- 1989–90: – Porthcawl Town

=== 1990s ===
- 1990–91: – Llwydcoed Welfare
- 1991–92: – Bridgend Street
- 1992–93: – Les Croupiers Caerau (Ely)
- 1993–94: – Les Croupiers Caerau (Ely)
- 1994–95: – Les Croupiers Caerau (Ely)
- 1995–96: – Gwynfi United
- 1996–97: – Les Croupiers Caerau (Ely)
- 1997–98: – Troedyrhiw
- 1998–99: – AFC Llwydcoed
- 1999–2000: – Bettws

=== 2000s ===
- 2000–01: – Grange Albion
- 2001–02: – Llantwit Fardre
- 2002–03: – Caerau All Whites
- 2003–04: – Pantyscallog Village Juniors
- 2004–05: – Cornelly United
- 2005–06: – Glyncorrwg Hall
- 2006–07: – Glyncorrwg Hall
- 2007–08: – Abernant Rovers
- 2008–09: – Penrhiwceiber Con A
- 2009–10: – Clwb Cymric

=== 2010s ===
- 2010–11: – Brackla
- 2011–12: – Trelai
- 2012–13: – Margam YC
- 2013–14: – Bluebird
- 2014–15: – Gelli Hibernia
- 2015–16: – Trebanog
- 2016–17: – Penydarren
- 2017–18: – No competition
- 2018–19: – Holton Road
- 2019–20: – Competition cancelled - Covid-19 pandemic

=== 2020s ===
- 2020–21: – No competition - Covid-19 pandemic
- 2021–22: – Llanrumney Athletic

=== Multiple winners - number of competition wins ===
- Caerau (Ely) – 5
- Guest Keen (Cardiff)/ GKB & N (Cardiff) – 5
- Cardiff Cosmos – 3
- Grange Albion – 3
- Swansea Nomads – 3
- Bridgend Street – 2
- Caerphilly United – 2
- Cambrian United – 2
- Ely Rangers – 2
- Glyncorrwg Hall – 2
- Hirwaun Welfare – 2
- Llantwit Fardre – 2
- Llwynypia Colliery – 2
- Milford Haven – 2
- Rogerstone – 2
- Taffs Well – 2
- Treorchy Juniors – 2
- Troedyrhiw Stars – 2
- Wattstown – 2
