= Llanarth FC =

Welsh football club

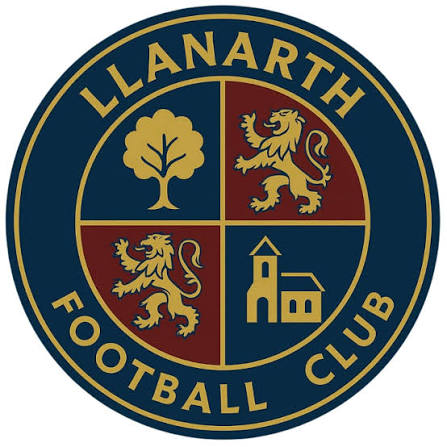
- Full name: Llanarth Football Club
- Founded: 2024
- Ground: Llanarth Village Hall
- League: Gwent Central League Division One (Tier 7)
- Website: https://llanarthfc.cymru
Home colours	Away colours

Llanarth Football Club (formerly Glascoed FC) is a Welsh association football team based in Llanarth, Monmouthshire. Founded in 2024, the club plays its home matches at Llanarth Village Hall and competes in the Gwent Central League Division One.

== History ==
A Glascoed FC team played in the Usk and District League in 1922 and 1923.

Glascoed FC 2024–25

Glascoed FC was formed in the summer of 2024 by players and community members from the Torfaen area. From the outset, Glascoed emphasised grassroots development and community engagement, launching a crowdfunding campaign that raised £1,715 to purchase a Veo 3 camera to support match analysis and produce highlights for the local community.

Glascoed competed in the Gwent Central League Division Two during their inaugural 2024–25 campaign.

The club achieved a league and cup double in its first season.

On 14 November 2024, the club secured a 3–2 Benevolent Cup quarter-final victory against Mardy 2nds, in a match covered by the Abergavenny Chronicle and the Forest of Dean & Wye Valley Review.

On 3 May 2025, Glascoed won the Benevolent Cup final, defeating Clydach Wasps 1–0. The victory was reported by the Abergavenny Chronicle.

During the league season, the team achieved notable results including a 7–0 win over Usk 2nds, featured in the Monmouthshire Beacon.

Fixtures and standings were tracked through official portals such as All Wales Sport.

2024–25 season summary

Competition	Result
Gwent Central League Division Two	Champions
Benevolent Cup	Winners
Promotion	Promoted to Division One

Gwent Central League 2024/2025 Benevolent Cup Final Starting XI vs Clydach Wasps F.C.

Glascoed FC 2025–26

Following their successful inaugural campaign, Glascoed FC entered the 2025–26 season in the Gwent Central League Division One following promotion from Division Two.

The 2025–26 campaign was the club's second season of competitive football and its first at Division One level.

In September 2025, Glascoed's debut season achievements were reported by multiple outlets including Yahoo Sports and the Free Press Series, highlighting both their competitive success and new sponsorship partnerships.

Glascoed finished the 2025–26 season in fifth position in the Gwent Central League Division One.

The season also represented the final campaign played under the Glascoed FC name before the club adopted the Llanarth FC identity.

2025–26 season summary

Competition	Result
Gwent Central League Division One	5th
FAW Tier	7

Llanarth FC 2026–27

From 1 July 2026, the club adopted the name Llanarth FC, beginning a new chapter in its history.

The name change followed two seasons of football under the Glascoed FC name and marked the club's move into a new identity representing Llanarth and the surrounding community.

Llanarth FC competes in the Gwent Central League Division One during the 2026–27 season.

The club retained its place in Division One following Glascoed's fifth-place finish during the 2025–26 season.

The 2026–27 season is therefore the first campaign in which the club competes under the Llanarth FC name.

2026–27 season information

Detail	Information
Club	Llanarth FC
Previous name	Glascoed FC
Season	2026–27
League	Gwent Central League Division One
FAW Tier	7
Ground	Llanarth Village Hall
Status	Season in progress

The new identity introduced a new navy and red club colour scheme and branding while retaining the competitive position achieved during the club's Glascoed era.

== Community & Development ==
Llanarth FC has placed emphasis on local partnerships and community integration. In 2025, the club partnered with Vitalize Radio to sponsor weekly match highlights and promote fixtures across Monmouthshire.

The club also invested in match analysis and media production, supported by the fundraising campaign for a Veo 3 camera.

== Current squad ==
As of 19 August 2026

Note: Flags indicate national team as defined under FIFA eligibility rules; some limited exceptions apply. Players may hold more than one non-FIFA nationality.

No.	Pos.	Nation	Player
1	GK	WAL	Paul Hale
2	DF	WAL	Dan Wilcox
3	DF	ENG	John Jones
4	DF	WAL	Lyndon Munn
5	DF	WAL	Liam Oliver
6	DF	WAL	Robert Thomas
99	DF	WAL	Daniel Hughes
7	DF	WAL	Jordan Taylor
8	MF	WAL	Kevin Andrews
9	MF	WAL	Keenan Welch
10	MF	WAL	Andrew Davey
12	MF	WAL	Kai Bevan
14	MF	WAL	Jack Bannister
15	MF	WAL	Callum Tudball

No.	Pos.	Nation	Player
16	MF	WAL	Riley Beard
17	MF	WAL	Andrew Lewis
18	FW	WAL	Kyle Baldwin
19	FW	WAL	Shane Davies
20	FW	ENG	Warren Ryan
21	FW	WAL	Dawson Stubbs
22	FW	WAL	Ashley Martin
23	FW	WAL	Tom Fowler
24	FW	WAL	Gavin Phillips
25	FW	WAL	Aaron Ewers

== Current Technical Team ==
Position	Name
Chairman/Manager	(Wales) Gavin Phillips
Vice Chairman/First Team Coach	(Wales) Aaron Ewers
Treasurer/Club Secretary	(Wales) Barry England
Kit Provider	(Wales) Tor Sports

== Club History ==
Season	FAW Tier	League	Final Position
2024–25	8	Gwent Central League Division Two	1st
2025–26	7	Gwent Central League Division One	5th
2026–27	7	Gwent Central League Division One	Season in progress

== Honours ==
- Gwent Central League Division Two – Champions: 2024–25
- Benevolent Cup – Winners: 2024–25
