= Cardiff Draconians F.C. =

Association football club in Wales

Coordinates: 51°30′0″N 3°12′52″W

Cardiff Draconians
- Full name: Cardiff Draconians Football Club
- Nickname: Dracs
- Founded: 1963
- Ground: Lydstep Park
- Manager: Nana Baah
- League: Cymru South
- 2025–26: Cymru South, 7th of 16
- Website: cardiffdracs.com
Home colours	Away colours

Cardiff Draconians Football Club is a Welsh football team based in Gabalfa, Cardiff, Wales. They play in the Cymru South.

== History ==
The Draconians were founded in 1963, receiving special permission to use the Draconians name first used by a Welsh representative side. In their first season in the Cardiff Combination League, they finished as Second Division champions.

The club changed its name to Gabalfa Draconians at about the time that the Llanidloes Road ground was first used for home games (1984–85 season), before reverting to their original name in 2000 when they entered the South Wales Amateur League.

After finishing as runner-up in the South Wales Alliance League Premier Division in 2019–20 and being granted a tier 3 licence by the Football Association of Wales, the club initially failed to gain a place in the new tier 3. However, after the withdrawal and folding of STM Sports, on 3 August 2020 the club was informed that they had been accepted to the new tier 3 Ardal Leagues South West for the 2020–21 season as the highest placed team from the Alliance League who had been awarded a licence.

In their first season in the Ardal South West, the club were runners up in the first Ardal Southern Cup final.

The club finished champions of the Ardal South West in the 2024-25 season and were promoted to the Cymru South (the Welsh second tier) for the first time in their history.

== Honours ==
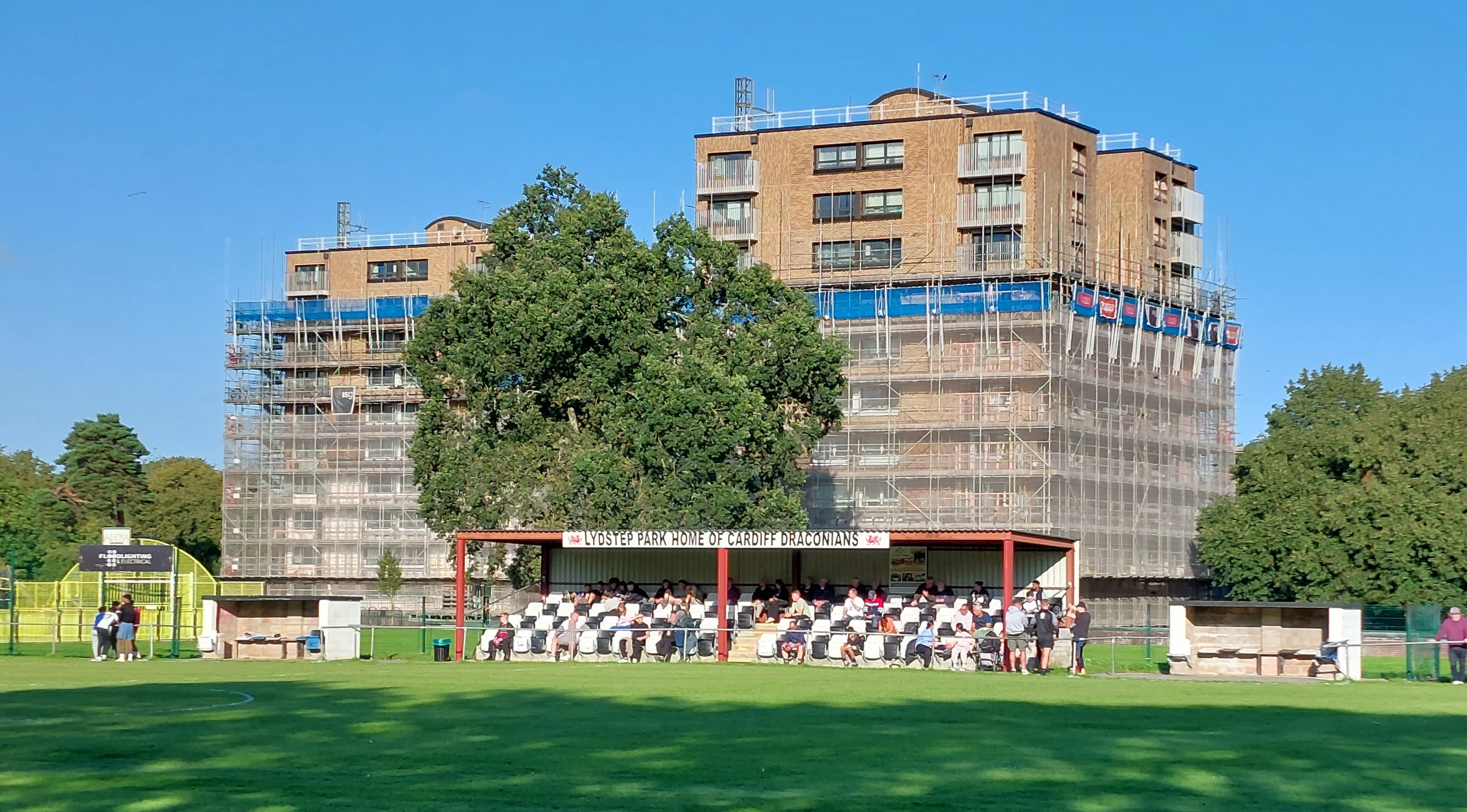
Lydstep Park, the home ground of Cardiff Draconians since the 1984–85 season

- Ardal SW – Champions: 2024–25
- South Wales Alliance League Premier Division – Runners-up: 2019–20
- South Wales Alliance League Division One – Champions: 2016–17; 2021-22
- South Wales Alliance League Division Two – Runners-up: 2015–16
- South Wales Amateur League Division Two – Champions: 2008–09
- South Wales Amateur League Division Two – Runners-up: 2000–01
- Cardiff Combination League Senior Division/ Premier Division – Champions (as Cardiff Draconians): 1967–68; 1971–72; 1973–74; 1979–80
- Cardiff Combination League Senior Division/ Premier Division – Champions (as Galbalfa Draconians): 1991–92; 1992–93; 1996–97; 1998–99
- Cardiff Combination League Second Division – Champions: 1963–64; 1972–73 (seconds)
- Cardiff Combination League Second Division Cup – Winners: 1972–73 (seconds)
- Cardiff Combination League Second Division Cup – Runners-up: 1963–64
- Cardiff Combination League Combination Cup – Winners: 1965–66; 1974–75
- WJ Owen Cup – Winners: 2017, 2019
- Ardal South Cup – Runners-up: 2021–22
- FAW Reserve League South Central - Champions: 2021–22
