= Cardiff Airport F.C. =

Association football club in Wales

Cardiff Airport
- Full name: Cardiff Airport Football Club
- Founded: 1970
- Ground: Jenner Park, Barry
- Capacity: 2,650
- Coach: Stephen Jones
- League: Ardal SW League
- 2025–26: Ardal SW League, 12th of 16

Cardiff Airport Football Club are a Welsh football club from Rhoose in the Vale of Glamorgan, Wales. They play in the Ardal SW League in the Welsh football pyramid.

== History ==
The club played in the Vale of Glamorgan League before being promoted to the South Wales Alliance League.

In the 2022–23 season, the club progressed to the third round of the Welsh Cup, their best performance in the club's history. They knocked out Cefn Fforest, Cardiff Bay, Cwmbach Royal Stars and Abergavenny Town before losing to tier two Cymru North team Porthmadog 5–1.

As champions of the South Wales Premier League's top division, the club will be promoted to the Ardal Leagues for the 2025–26 season, tier three of the Welsh Football Pyramid, marking the highest level the club has operated at.

== Honours ==
- South Wales Premier League Premier Division – Champions: 2024–25
- South Wales Alliance League Division One – Champions: 2021–22
- South Wales Alliance League Division Two – Runners-up: 2017–18
- Vale of Glamorgan League Premier Division – Champions: 2014–15, 2015–16, 2024–25 (reserves)
- W J Owen Cup – Winners: 2024–25
- ASRS Cup – Winners: 2012–13, 2014–15
