= Canton F.C. =

Association football club in Wales

Coordinates: 51°28′23.4″N 3°12′47.4″W

Canton FC
- Full name: Canton FC
- Founded: 2006
- Ground: Cardiff International Sport Stadium SSI Pitch, part of the Cardiff International Sports Campus
- Chairman: Dean Bowden
- Manager: Daniel Tanhai
- League: Ardal SE League
- 2024–25: Ardal SE League, 5th of 16

Canton Football Club is a Welsh football team based in Canton, Cardiff, Wales. The club plays in the Ardal SE League.

== History ==
The club was established as Canton Liberal FC in 2006, named after a local social club, and initially played in the Cardiff & District League. In their first four seasons they won each divisional title. They were champions of the Premier Division in the 2012–13 season, joining the South Wales Amateur League Division Two, where they were champions in 2014–15. They joined the newly formed South Wales Alliance League for the 2015–16 season, and were again league champions, gaining promotion to the Premier Division for the 2016–17 season.

Canton finished third in the South Wales Alliance League Premier Division in the 2021–22 season missing out on promotion by one point.

Christopher Dye became the first player to make 500 appearances for the club, spanning 13 seasons.

=== Promotion to the third tier ===
The club finished second in the South Wales Alliance Premier Division at the end of 2022–23 season, and earned promotion to the Ardal South-West, the third tier in the Welsh pyramid. During that season Canton had the strongest defence in the league, conceding 31 goals in 28 games, which was better than the league winners Cardiff Corinthians. Canton scored a total of 87 goals, which was second best in the league. They also reached the final of the J.Owen Cup but were well beaten 1–0 by Cardiff Cosmopolitan.

During the club's 2022—23 awards ceremony, vice captain Brian Camilleri won the Manager's Player award for the season, featuring for the first team 33 times throughout the season, contributing to three goals and one assist accompanied by seven clean sheets. Kofi Rowe won the Player's Player award, finishing top scorer for the club and also winning the South Wales Alliance League Golden boot in the lague campaign with 29 goals overall and 9 assists. Captain Bo Cordle finished with the highest amount of assists for the club for the second season in a row with 21 in all competitions, 17 of those in the league, along with 17 goals in all competitions. Cohen Riella won the Golden Glove award for the season with 10 clean sheets altogether. He also scored a goal and provided three assists while playing in goal.

In July 2023, the club changed its name to Canton, dropping Liberal from the title.

== Current squad ==
Note: Flags indicate national team as defined under FIFA eligibility rules; some limited exceptions apply. Players may hold more than one non-FIFA nationality.

No.	Pos.	Nation	Player
1	GK	WAL	Cohen Riella
25	GK	POR	Namir Queni
30	GK	WAL	Aaron Fettah
32	GK	WAL	James Wood
2	DF	WAL	Christopher Dye
3	DF	WAL	Luke Davies
4	DF	WAL	Arron Garrett
5	DF	WAL	Sam O'Sullivan
12	DF	ENG	David Trace
15	DF	WAL	Harvey Powell
16	DF	WAL	Brian Camilleri (VC)
17	DF	WAL	Nile White
18	DF	AUS	David Allen
20	DF	WAL	Stephen Ward
23	DF	WAL	Kyle Campbell

No.	Pos.	Nation	Player
6	MF	WAL	Ashley Park
7	MF	WAL	Andre Phillips
8	MF	WAL	Harri Collins
13	MF	WAL	Louie Crowe
14	MF	WAL	Cian Hales
19	MF	IRN	Saul Tanhai
26	MF	GAM	Abdoulie Tunkara
27	MF	ESP	Dani Rodriguez
9	FW	WAL	Kofi Rowe
10	FW	WAL	Jordan Carey
11	FW	WAL	Tyrrell Webbe
21	FW	POR	Mario Amona
22	FW	WAL	Bo Cordle (C)
24	FW	WAL	Adam Jones
29	FW	WAL	Fin Richards

=== Technical staff ===
Position	Name
Club Chairman	(Wales) Dean Bowden
Manager	(Wales) (Iran) Daniel Tanhai
Assistant manager	(Wales) Sam O'Sullivan
Coach	(Wales) James Wood
Coach	(Wales) Neil Thomas
Reserve Manager	(Wales) Mark Tucker
Youth Team Manager	(Wales) Craig Robinson
Youth Coach	(Wales) Christopher Dye
Coach	(Wales) Nathan Murphy
Kitman	(Wales) (United States) Ezra Harper
Kit Ladie	(Wales) (Iran) Freya Tanhai

== Honours ==
- South Wales Alliance League Division One: – Champions: 2015–16
- South Wales Amateur League Division Two: – Champions: 2014–15
- Cardiff & District League Premier Division: – Champions: 2010–11, 2012–13
- Cardiff & District League Division One: – Champions: 2009–10
- Cardiff & District League Division Two: – Champions: 2008–09
- Cardiff & District League Division Three: – Champions: 2007–08
- Cardiff & District League Division Four: – Champions: 2006–07
- South Wales Alliance League (W John Owen) Cup: – Runners-up: 2022–23
