= Graig Villa Dino F.C. =

Association football club in Wales

Graig Villa Dino
- Ground: Whiteheads Sports Ground
- League: Gwent County League Premier Division
- 2025–26: Gwent County League Division One, 2nd of 15 (promoted)

Graig Villa Dino Football Club is an association football club based in the Graig area of the city of Newport, South Wales. The team currently play in the Gwent County League Premier Division.

== History ==
The team was known as Christchurch Hamdden and played in the Gwent County League in Divisions Two and Three in the early 2000s. In 2007 the team changed its name to Villa Dino/ Christchurch. In 2010 the club left the league and played in the Newport and District Football League until re-joining the Gwent County League for 2015–16 season, where they ended the season as Division Three champions. They followed this up with a back-to-back championship win in Division Two for the 2016–17 season.

The team changed its name again to Graig Villa Dino as it merged with Whitehead Graig United ahead of the 2021–22 season.

== Honours ==
- Gwent County League Division Two - Champions: 2016–17
- Gwent County League Division Three - Champions: 2015–16
- Newport and District Football League Premier 'X' - Champions: 2014–15
- Gwent League Challenge Cup – Winners: 2016–17
- Gwent Amateur Cup – Runners-up: 2016–17
