= East Gwent League =

- Founded: 1913
- Country: Wales
- Number of clubs: 16
- Level on pyramid: 7–8
- Promotion to: Gwent County League Division Two
- Current champions: Sudbrook Cricket Club (2025–26)

The East Gwent Association Football League (currently billed as The Monmouthshire Windows East Gwent Association Football League for sponsorship reasons) is a football league covering the eastern part of the preserved county of Gwent. It is affiliated to the Gwent County Football Association. The leagues are at the seventh and eighth levels of the Welsh football league system.

== Area ==
The area of the league is bordered by the River Severn/ Bristol Channel on the South and the River Wye on the East to Monmouth. The league area continues west to include Raglan then following a line south to, but not including Llanwern, then on to the River Severn/ Bristol Channel.

== Divisions ==
The league is composed of two divisions.

=== Member clubs 2026–27 ===
==== Division One ====
- Caldicot Castle
- Caldicot Town (reserves)
- Chepstow Town (thirds)
- Monmouth Town (reserves)
- Rockfield Rovers
- Sudbrook Cricket Club
- Underwood
- Undy Athletic (thirds)

==== Division Two ====
- Caldicot Castle (reserves)
- Portskewett & Sudbrook
- Raglan Juniors
- Severn Tunnel
- Sudbrook Cricket Club (reserves)
- Thornwell Red & White (reserves)
- Tintern Abbey
- Underwood (reserves)

== Promotion and relegation ==
The league features other teams of clubs with representation at higher levels of the Welsh football pyramid. Promotion from the First Division is to the Gwent County League Division Two may be possible if a team is eligible.

== Champions: Division One ==
- 1973–74: Undy Athletic
- 1994–95: Bulwark
- 1995–96: Mathern Athletic 'A'
- 1996–97: Tintern Abbey
- 1997–98: Thornwell Red & White
- 1998–99: Tintern Abbey
- 2001–02: Sudbrook Cricket Club 'A'
- 2002–03: Underwood Social Club
- 2003–04: Underwood Athletic 'A'
- 2004–05: not declared
- 2005–06: Tintern Abbey
- 2006–07: Tintern Abbey
- 2007–08: Rockfield Rovers (?)
- 2008–09: Tintern Abbey
- 2009–10:
- 2010–11:
- 2011–12: Tintern Abbey
- 2012–13: Mathern Wanderers 'A'
- 2013–14: Underwood Athletic 'A'
- 2014–15: Sudbrook Cricket Club 'A'
- 2015–16: Mathern 'A'
- 2016–17: Underwood Athletic 'A'
- 2017–18: Caldicot Castle 'A'
- 2018–19: Caldicot Castle 'A'
- 2019–20: Iscoed Tafarn
- 2020–21: No competition
- 2021–22: Thornwell Red & White
- 2022–23: Underwood
- 2023–24: Underwood
- 2024–25: Caldicot Castle
- 2025–26: Sudbrook Cricket Club
