= Aberdare Valley League =

- Founded: 1904, 1924
- Country: Wales
- Number of clubs: 14
- Level on pyramid: 7
- Promotion to: South Wales Premier League
- Current champions: AFC Llwydcoed reserves (2025–26)
- Website: Aberdare Valley League

The Aberdare Valley Association Football League is a football league affiliated to the South Wales FA and provides football at the seventh level of the Welsh football league system. The league's boundaries stretch from Rhigos in the north to Carnetown, Abercynon in the south of the Cynon Valley.

== History ==
The Aberdare & District Junior League was founded in 1904. The founder member clubs were: Aberaman Stars, Aberaman Windsors, Aberdare Crescents, Aberdare Excelsiors, Cefnpennar, Cwmbach Lilywhites, Gadlys Rovers, Greenhill Rovers, GWR Rovers and Mardy Albions, and the first champions were Aberdare Crescents.

Also in 1904, the Aberdare Leader Junior Medals competition was founded by the local newspaper, and was won by Aberaman Windsors.

The league renamed to the Aberdare & District (Belle Vue) League in 1907, but folded in 1908. The league briefly returned for the 1909–10 season, but then would not return until 1924, being reformed as the Aberdare Valley Football League.

Since 2015, the league has not had junior divisions (under-12 to under-16), with it now being the responsibility of the newly formed Cynon Rhondda Merthyr Junior Football League.

The league is currently at the seventh tier of the Welsh football league system, and a feeder league to the South Wales Premier League.

== Premier Division ==
As of the 2026–27 season, the league consists of 14 teams:

=== Member clubs for 2026–27 season ===
- AFC Abercynon
- AFC Llwydcoed (reserves)
- AFC Oak
- AFC Penrhiwceiber (reserves)
- Aberdare Town
- Aberdare Town reserves
- Abernant
- Carnetown
- Cwmbach Royal Stars (reserves)
- Cwmdare
- FC Cwmaman (reserves)
- Hirwaun
- Penrhiwceiber Social
- Penywaun

== Champions (Top Division) ==
=== 1900s ===
- 1904–05: – Aberdare Crescents
- 1905–06: – Aberdare Crescents
- 1906–07: – Aberdare Crescents
- 1907–08: –
- 1908–09: – No competition
- 1909–10: –

=== 1920s ===
- 1924–25:
- 1925–26:
- 1926–27:
- 1927–28:
- 1928–29:
- 1929–30:

=== 1930s ===
- 1930–31: – Hirwaun K.B.R.
- 1931–32:
- 1932–33:
- 1933–34: – Hirwaun K.B.R.
- 1934–35: – Hirwaun K.B.R.
- 1935–36:
- 1936–37: – Hirwaun Welfare
- 1937–38:
- 1938–39:
- 1939–40:

=== 1940s ===
- 1940–41:
- 1941–42:
- 1942–43:
- 1943–44:
- 1944–45:
- 1945–46:
- 1946–47: – Hirwaun Welfare
- 1947–48: – Abercwmboi Athletic
- 1948–49:
- 1949–50:

=== 1950s ===
- 1950–51:
- 1951–52:
- 1952–53:
- 1953–54: – Llwydcoed Welfare
- 1954–55: – Llwydcoed Welfare
- 1955–56:
- 1956–57:
- 1957–58:
- 1958–59:
- 1959–60:

=== 1960s ===
- 1960–61:
- 1961–62:
- 1962–63:
- 1963–64:
- 1964–65:
- 1965–66:
- 1966–67:
- 1967–68:
- 1968–69: – Ivy Bush
- 1968–69:
- 1969–70:

=== 1970s ===
- 1970–71:
- 1971–72:
- 1972–73:
- 1973–74:
- 1974–75:
- 1975–76:
- 1976–77:
- 1977–78:
- 1978–79: – FC Cwmaman
- 1979–80: – FC Cwmaman

=== 1980s ===
- 1980–81: – FC Cwmaman
- 1981–82:
- 1982–83:
- 1983–84:
- 1984–85:
- 1985–86:
- 1986–87:
- 1987–88:
- 1988–89:
- 1989–90: – Cwmbach Royal Stars 'A'

=== 1990s ===
- 1990–91:
- 1991–92: – Baileys Arms
- 1992–93: – Aberaman Ex-Servicemen
- 1993–94: – FC Abercwmboi
- 1994–95: – Baileys Arms
- 1995–96: – Penrhiwceiber Con
- 1996–97: – Aberaman Ex-Servicemen
- 1997–98: – Cwmbach Royal Stars 'A'
- 1998–99: – Penywaun
- 1999–2000: – Osborne Athletic

=== 2000s ===
- 2000–01: – Mountain Ash Town
- 2001–02: – Hirwaun Welfare
- 2002–03: – Mountain Ash Town
- 2003–04: – Park Rovers
- 2004–05: – Abercynon Athletic
- 2005–06: – AFC Abercynon
- 2006–07: – Abernant Rovers '97
- 2007–08: – Aberaman
- 2008–09: – Aberaman
- 2009–10: – Perthcelyn United

=== 2010s ===
- 2010–11: – Perthcelyn United
- 2011–12: – AFC Abercynon 'A'
- 2012–13: – Tynte Rovers
- 2013–14: – FC Abercwmboi 'A'
- 2014–15: – FC Abercwmboi
- 2015–16: – Carnetown 'A'
- 2016–17: – FC Abercwmboi 'A'
- 2017–18: – Hirwaun Sports
- 2018–19: – FC Abercwmboi 'A'
- 2019–20: – AFC Abercynon 'A'

=== 2020s ===
- 2020–21: – cancelled due to COVID-19 pandemic
- 2021–22: – Cwmbach Royal Stars reserves
- 2022–23: – Cwmbach Royal Stars reserves
- 2023–24: – Penywaun
- 2024–25: – AFC Abercynon
- 2025–26: – AFC Llwydcoed reserves
