= Blaenavon Blues A.F.C. =

Association football club in Wales

Coordinates: 51°46′41″N 3°5′19″W

Blaenavon Blues
- Full name: Blaenavon Blues Association Football Club
- Nickname: Blues
- Founded: 1946
- Ground: The Memorial Ground
- Chairman: Lee Wathen
- Coach: Ryan Keen
- League: Ardal SE League
- 2025–26: Ardal SE League, 8th of 16
Home colours	Away colours

Blaenavon Blues A.F.C. are a Welsh football club from the town of Blaenavon, Torfaen in south eastern Wales. Formed in 1946, they have played in the Welsh Football League. They currently play in the Ardal SE League.

== History ==
There has been many clubs in Blaenavon dating back to the 1900s. Most of these clubs had been church sides, and not one of the sides made an impact on a senior level. Clubs that represented the town included Blaenavon Thursdays, Clapham United from Forgeside, The Corinthians, and Garn-yr-erw. There is also evidence of a Blaenavon side competing in the Usk & District league in 1936 to 1939.

Following the end of the Second World War, Blaenavon man Ernest Pugh founded Blaenavon Blues AFC in the summer of 1946. During the early years the club played in the local leagues. The 1960s saw an upturn in the club's achievements and in 1960 the club won a treble of cups, The Langdon, Benevolent and Peake Cups. Back to back Championship wins in 1960–61 and 1961–62 along with two more Langdon Cup wins and two Benevolent Cup wins saw the club dominate the Pontypool league. The club again won the league in 1966–67.

The club applied for admittance into the Gwent Senior and Welsh Football Leagues and were accepted, with the 1968–69 season seeing the Blues playing senior football for the first time in their history.

In 1972 former Busby babe Ken Morgans managed the team for a season. The following year saw the club finish third, and in 1974–75 the club finished as champions of the tier 3 Welsh Football League Division Two. The club spent the next three years in the second tier before being relegated. The club continued to play in the Welsh league until the end of the 1990–91 season when a decision was made to leave the league given the pending Welsh pyramid re-organisation. After resignation from the league, the club dropped into the Gwent County League.

The 2021–22 season saw the club go unbeaten in the Gwent County Premier Division across 30 games but finish as runners-up on goal difference to Lliswerry, having scored 99 goals and conceded 22 goals. The runner-up spot entitled the club to promotion to the tier 3 Ardal Leagues pending the outcome of their tier three Certification application to the Football Association of Wales, which was awarded in May 2022.

In the 2025–26 season the club reached the second round of the Welsh Cup for the first time in their history.

== Honours ==
- Welsh Football League Division Two (Tier 3 of the Welsh Football League)
  - Champions (1): 1974–75
- Gwent Central League
  - Division One – Champions (5): 1960–61, 1961–62, 1966–67, 1992–93, 1996–97
  - Division One – Runners-Up (2): 1965–66, 2007–08
  - Division Two – Champions: (1): 1989–90
  - Division Two – Runners-Up (2): 2003–04
- Gwent County League
  - Premier Division – Runners-Up (2): 2019–20, 2021–22
  - Division One – Runners-Up (1): 2005–06
  - Division Two – Runners-Up (1): 2003–04
  - Division Three - Runners-Up (1): 2002–03
- Gwent Senior League
  - Division Two - Champions (1): 1977–78
- Gwent County FA Senior Cup
  - Winners – 2021–22
- The Langdon Cup
  - Winners (4): 1959–60, 1960–61; 1961–62, 2004–05
  - Runners-Up (1): 1953–54
- Benevolent Cup
  - Winners (6): 1959–60, 1960–61; 1962–63, 1995–96; 2002–03; 2003–04
  - Runners-Up (2): 1964–65; 1966–67
- E.I.Peake Cup
  - Winners (1): 1959–60
- Open Cup
  - Winners (2): 1992–93; 2005–06
  - Runners-Up (1): 2007–08
- Super Cup
  - Winners (1): 2005–06

== Welsh Football League history ==
Information in this section is sourced from the Football Club History Database and the Welsh Soccer Archive.

Season	Pyramid Tier	League	Final position
1968–69 (Note: From the 1964–65 season Division 1 was renamed 'Premier Division', Division 2 East and West were replaced by 'Division 1' and 'Division 2' (effectively Division 2 and Division 3).)	3	Welsh Football League Division Two	12th
1969–70	3	Welsh Football League Division Two	11th
1970–71	3	Welsh Football League Division Two	13th
1971–72	3	Welsh Football League Division Two	7th
1972–73	3	Welsh Football League Division Two	8th
1973–74	3	Welsh Football League Division Two	3rd
1974–75	3	Welsh Football League Division Two	1st - Champions (promoted)
1975–76	2	Welsh Football League Division One	6th
1976–77	2	Welsh Football League Division One	9th
1977–78	2	Welsh Football League Division One	7th
1978–79	2	Welsh Football League Division One	9th
1979–89	3	Welsh Football League Division Two	17th (relegated)
1980–81	3	Welsh Football League Division Two	19th
1981–82	3	Welsh Football League Division Two	8th
1982–83	3	Welsh Football League Division Two	6th
1983–84 (Note: In this season The Premier Division (Division 1) was renamed 'National Division'. The 2nd tier division was renamed 'Premier Division' with the 3rd tier division named 'Division 1'.)	3	Welsh Football League Division One	3rd
1984–85	2	Welsh Football League Premier Division	8th
1985–86	2	Welsh Football League Premier Division	7th
1986–87	2	Welsh Football League Premier Division	16th (relegated)
1987–88	3	Welsh Football League Division One	8th
1988–89	3	Welsh Football League Division One	13th
1989–90	3	Welsh Football League Division One	4th
1990–91	3	Welsh Football League Division Two	10th
