= Clwb Cymric F.C. =

Association football club in Wales

Cymric
- Full name: Clwb Cymric
- Founded: 1969
- Ground: Ocean Park Arena; Cardiff
- Capacity: 220
- Chairman: (Wales) Hywel Price
- Coach: (Wales) Steve Cope
- League: South Wales Premier League Premier Division
- 2024–25: South Wales Premier League Championship Division, 2nd of 12 (promoted)
Home colours

Clwb Cymric (Welsh: Clwb Pêl-Droed Amatur Cymry Cymraeg o Gaerdydd) are a Welsh language football club from Cardiff, Wales. They play in the South Wales Premier League Premier Division.

== History ==
Clwb Cymric was established in September 1969, initially as a men’s football team which competed in the Cardiff & District League Division Five for the 1969–70 season. The establishment of the football club was inspired by the formation of Cardiff Welsh Rugby Club in 1967.

The initial players of the club were all Welsh speakers and socialised in the New Ely pub in Cathays, Cardiff, formed the club which was originally named Clwb Pêl-droed Cymry Caerdydd. Opposition players and staff soon referred to them as “The Cardiff Welsh”. The club was renamed Clwb Cymric, as Cymric is an adjective for Welsh in culture and language.

The club played much of its history in the Cardiff & District League, rising through the league's pyramid and winning the top division's title three times, before gaining promotion to the South Wales Amateur League. The club rose through the divisions of this league and its successor, the South Wales Alliance League. At the end of the 2024–25 season they finished as league runners-up in the South Wales Premier League Championship Division, gaining promotion to tier four for the first time for the 2025–26 season.

The first team reached the second round of the Welsh Cup in 2024 losing 0–3 to Llanelli Town.

By 2024 the club had evolved to include other teams and sports including, three men's teams, a women's football team, Cymric Women's Netball Club, Cymric Women's Hockey Club, and approximately 750 school-age girls and boys playing in teams with the club.

== Ground ==
Cymric's home playing field was the Cwrt-yr-Ala field in the Ely, Cardiff area, but in 2021 they moved to the newly-built Ocean Park Arena in Cardiff Bay.

== Club colours ==
The team played their first game wearing red shirts and socks and green shorts but as their opponent's shirts were also green, the Welsh had to play their first game shirtless. The official kit of shirts with horizontal green and white stripes was adopted for the 1985-86 season when the club played in the Cardiff and District Premier League for the first time.

Over the years the kit has changed several times. Their first team shirt is now green and white stripes – a strip similar to that of Celtic FC.

== Carwyn Award ==
Since the 2006-07 season the Carwyn Award has been awarded for a player's contribution to the club over the season. The award is named in memory of Carwyn Thomas, who was originally from Tregarth near Bangor and was a leading player for the club for a decade but died in 2006. Before his death Carwyn was the only player to win the 'Player of the Year' award for the second team and the first team. He also designed the club's emblem.

== Club Englyn ==
The club has an official englyn composed by Carwyn Eckley:

Waeth o le o'r Sowth o Lŷn - ni ddynion
y ddinas sy'n perthyn
Dan undod y bathodyn
mond Cymric sy'n cynnig hyn

== Honours ==
- South Wales Premier League Championship – Runners-up: 2024–25
- South Wales Amateur League Division Two – Runners-up: 2012–13
- Cardiff & District League – Champions: 2005–06, 2009–10, 2011–12
- Cardiff & District League – Runners–up: 2006–07, 2007–08, 2010–11
- Cardiff & District League Cup – Winners: 2005–06
- South Wales Intermediate Cup – Winners: 2009–10
