= Tynte Rovers A.F.C. =

Former association football club in Wales

Tynte Rovers
- Full name: Tynte Rovers A.F.C.
- Dissolved: 2019
- Ground: Glasbrook Terrace

Tynte Rovers Football Club was a Welsh football team based in Mountain Ash, in the Cynon Valley, within the County Borough of Rhondda Cynon Taf, Wales. The club last played in the South Wales Alliance League and had previously played in the Welsh Football League for 31 seasons.

== History ==
The club joined the Welsh Football League as a Division Two East club for the 1958–59 season. They finished runners-up for three successive seasons between 1961–62 and 1963–64. The club remained in the second tier of the league until end of the 1975–76 season and remained in the third tier until the end of the 1988–89 season when they left the league.

The club then played in the Aberdare Valley League being crowned as Premier Division champions in the 2012–13 season, and were promoted to the South Wales Amateur League Division Two for the 2013–14 season. They then transferred into the newly formed South Wales Alliance League Division Two for the 2015–16 season.

In July 2019 the club announced they had folded.

== Honours ==
- Welsh Football League Division Two East – Runners-up: 1961–62; 1962–63; 1963–64
- South Wales Intermediate Cup – Winners: 1962–63
- Aberdare Valley League Premier Division – Champions: 2012–13
