= FC Cwmaman =

Association football club in Wales

- Full name: Football Club Cwmaman
- Founded: 1965 as Ivy Bush FC
- League: South Wales Premier League Premier Division
- 2024–25: South Wales Alliance League Premier Division, 10th of 12
- Website: http://www.cwmamaninstitutefc.co.uk/
Home colours	Away colours

Football Club Cwmaman are a Welsh football team based in the village of Cwmaman near Aberdare. They play in the South Wales Premier League Premier Division. They formerly played in the Welsh Football League during a period when the club were known as Cwmaman Institute.

== History ==
The club were founded in 1965 as Ivy Bush, winning the Aberdare Valley League in 1968–69, before changing the name of the club to FC Cwmaman in 1976. Following the change of name. the club saw a period of success with three successive seasons where they finished champions of the league. They applied to join the South Wales Amateur League on a number of occasions and were turned down, before in 1983 they were admitted to the league. In 2000 the club changed its name to Cwmaman Institute. After a number of seasons where the club finished at the top part of the table, in 2006–07, they were champions of Division One, gaining promotion to the Welsh Football League. At the end of the 2010–11 season they finished as runners-up in Division Two, gaining promotion to Division One. In 2011 they received an undisclosed percentage of the proceeds from the Stereophonics pre-Christmas gigs.

The club then had three successive seasons when they were relegated, finishing 14th (of 16 teams) in their only season in Division One, followed by finishing bottom of Division Two the following season and second from bottom of the Division Three, and hence left the Weish League. The club joined the South Wales Senior League in Division One for a singular season before moving to the newly formed South Wales Alliance League in Division One for the 2015–16 season. The club then changed its name back to being called FC Cwmaman.

The club were promoted to the Premier Division at the end of the 2018–19 season after a third-place finish in Division One.

== Honours ==
- Welsh Football League Division Two – Runners-up: 2010–11
- South Wales Alliance League Premier Division – Champions: 2023–24
- South Wales Amateur League Division One – Champions: 2006–07
- Aberdare Valley League Premier Division – Champions: 1968–69, 1978–79, 1979–80, 1980–81
- Aberdare Valley League Division One – Champions: 1977–78, 1980–81
- Aberdare Valley League Cup – Winners: 1977–78
- Aberdare Valley League Coronation Cup – Winners: 1980–81
- Aberdare Valley League Jubilee Cup – Winners: 2021–22
