= Nathan Cadette =

Welsh footballer

Personal information
- Full name: Nathan Daniel Cadette
- Date of birth: 6 January 1980 (age 46)
- Place of birth: Cardiff, Wales
- Height: 5 ft 2 in (1.57 m)
- Positions: Striker; midfielder; full back

Team information
- Current team: Goytre United (manager)

Senior career*
| Years | Team | Apps | (Gls) |
| 1997–1999 | Cardiff City | 4 | (0) |
| 1998–1999 | → Telford United (loan) | | |
| 1999 | Aberystwyth Town | 1 | (0) |
| 1999–2000 | Llanelli | 8 | (0) |
| 2006–2009 | Barry Town | 66 | (1) |
| 2009–? | Aberaman Athletic | | |

Managerial career
- 2011–2012: Caldicot Town
- 2015–2017: STM Sports
- 2018–2019: STM Sports (Assistant Manager)
- 2019–: Bridgend Street
- * Club domestic league appearances and goals

Nathan Daniel Cadette (born 6 January 1980) is a Welsh former professional footballer who played as a striker, midfielder and full back. He is currently manager of Goytre United.

== Club career ==
Born in Cardiff, Cadette began his career with his hometown club Cardiff City and made his professional debut during the 1997–98 season. He was handed his first professional contract at the end of the season before joining non-league side Telford United on loan in order to gain first team experience. However, he was released by Cardiff on his return and had short spells with League of Wales sides Aberystwyth Town and Llanelli. He later played for Barry Town, where he inexplicably scored an own goal versus Tredegar Town, and Aberaman Athletic.

== Managerial career ==
In October 2011, Cadette was appointed manager of Caldicot Town, where he had previously been assistant manager, following the resignation of Mike Dowler. He remained in charge until the end of the season, in May 2012.

Cadette was appointed manager of STM Sports in 2015, leading the side to promotion into the Welsh Football League Division Two. However, he stood down from the role in May 2017 due to work commitments. He later returned to the club as assistant manager.

In May 2019 he was appointed manager of Bridgend Street.
