= Vale of Glamorgan League =

Association football league in Wales

- Founded: 1998
- Country: Wales
- Number of clubs: 34
- Level on pyramid: 7–9
- Promotion to: South Wales Premier League
- Current champions: Barry Athletic (2025–26)
- Website: Vale of Glamorgan Association Football League

The Vale of Glamorgan Association Football League is a football league covering the area of the Vale of Glamorgan in Glamorgan, South Wales and the surrounding areas. The leagues are at the seventh and eighth levels of the Welsh football league system.

== History ==
The league has its origins in the Barry and District League, first formed in 1907.

== Divisions ==
The league is composed of three divisions, which are in tiers seven, eight and nine of the Welsh Football League System.

== Member clubs for 2025–26 season ==
The following clubs are competing in the Vale of Glamorgan League during the 2025–26 season.

=== Premier Division ===
- AFC Rhoose
- Barry Athletic
- Cadoxton Imps
- Cardiff Airport (reserves)
- Cwm Talwg
- Island Marine
- Penarth Town
- St Athan
- Vale Madrid
- Vale United (reserves)

=== Championship ===
- AFC Rhoose (reserves)
- Barry Athletic (reserves)
- Cardiff Airport (vets)
- Cogan Coronation (reserves)
- Cowbridge Town (withdrew May 2026)
- Dinas Powys (development)
- Island Marine (reserves)
- Peterston-Super-Ely
- Porthkerry Panthers
- Rhoose Social
- St Athan (reserves)
- Vale Athletic

=== Division One ===
- Barry Athletic (development)
- Cadoxton Imps (reserves)
- Ely Rangers (reserves)
- FC Barry
- Holton Road (reserves)
- Island Marine (development)
- Llantwit Major (thirds)
- Penarth Town (development)
- Rhoose Social (Reserves)
- Sparta Park
- St Athan (development)
- Sully Sports (development)
- Vale of Glamorgan Rovers

== Promotion and relegation ==
Promotion from the Premier Division is possible to the lowest tier of the South Wales Premier League, with the champion of the league playing the other tier 7 champions from the South Wales regional leagues via play-off games to determine promotion.

== Champions (Premier Division) ==
- 2002–03: – FC Blazes
- 2003–04: – N&M Construction
- 2004–05: – N&M Construction
- 2005–06: – St Athan
- 2006–07: – Rhoose
- 2007–08: – Penarth Town
- 2008–09: – SW Flooring
- 2009–10: – SW Dockers
- 2010–11: – Dockers
- 2011–12: – AFC Colcot
- 2012–13: – AFC Colcot
- 2013–14: – Barry Athletic
- 2014–15: – Cardiff Airport (100% win record)
- 2015–16: – Cardiff Airport
- 2016–17: – Vale United
- 2017–18: – Barry Athletic
- 2018–19: – Barry Athletic
- 2019–20: – Island Marine
- 2020–21: – Competition cancelled due to Covid-19 pandemic
- 2021–22: – Penarth Town
- 2022–23: – Holton Road (promoted to SWAL through play-off finals)
- 2023–24: – St Athan
- 2024–25: – Cardiff Airport reserves
- 2025–26: – Barry Athletic
