= Cardiff Albion A.F.C. =

Former football club based in Cardiff

Cardiff Albion
- Full name: Cardiff Albion Association Football Club
- Founded: 1898

Cardiff Albion Association Football Club was a Welsh football club based in Cardiff. They played in the Cardiff & District League, as well as the Welsh Cup and FA Cup.

== History ==
The club was formed in 1898, mostly made up of players from the Radnor and Severn Road school teams. In the 1901–02 season they were champions of the Cardiff & District League and winners of the Bevan Shield.

From 1914–15 to 1922–23 the club entered the Welsh Cup. In 1920–21 they also entered the FA Cup, losing 4–0 in the preliminary round against Aberdare Athletic.
