= A.F.C. Rhoose =

Association football club in Wales

AFC Rhoose
- Founded: 1969
- Ground: Ceri Road, Rhoose
- League: Vale of Glamorgan Premier
- 2025–26: Vale of Glamorgan Premier, 8th of 10
Away colours

AFC Rhoose are a Welsh football club from Rhoose, a village and community near the sea (the Bristol Channel) in the Vale of Glamorgan, Wales, near Barry. They played for two seasons in the Welsh Football League. They play in the Vale of Glamorgan Premier.

== Club history ==
The club was formed in 1969 as Rhoose Social in the Barry and District League. The club, as Rhoose FC, were accepted into the South Wales Amateur League for a second time in 2006–07 and were Division Two champions in the 2007–08 season. In the 2012–13 season they were Division One champions and beat Sully Sports (champions of the South Wales Senior League in the Welsh Football League promotion play-off match.

The club spent the following two seasons in Welsh Football League Division Three, finishing eighth and fifth respectively before they resigned from the league at the end of the season.

The club's current organisation came as an amalgamation of the different football teams playing in Rhoose in 2015. Senior teams Pro Copy Athletic and Rhoose Rovers merged in addition to the mini and junior teams of Rhoose Athletic to play under one united club as AFC Rhoose.

== Honours ==
=== A.F.C. Rhoose ===
- Vale of Glamorgan League Premier Division – Runners-Up: 2018–19
- Vale of Glamorgan League First Division – Champions: 2019–20 (reserves team)
- Vale of Glamorgan League Second Division – Champions: 2018–19 (reserves team)
- ASRS Cup – Winners: 2018–19
- ASRS Cup – Winners: 2021–22
- Barry Cup – Runners–up: 2022–23

=== Rhoose F.C. ===
- South Wales Amateur League Division One – Champions: 2012–13
- South Wales Amateur League Division Two – Champions: 2007–08
- Vale of Glamorgan League Premier Division – Champions: 2006–07
- South Wales FA Senior Cup – Winners: 2009–10

=== Rhoose Rovers ===
- Vale of Glamorgan League Second Division – Champions: 2012–13
- Dockers Cup – Winners: 2012–13

=== Pro Copy Athletic ===
- Vale of Glamorgan League Division One – Champions: 2012–13
- Vale of Glamorgan League Division Two – Champions: 2011–12
- Dockers Cup – Winners: 2011–12

== Seasons (as Rhoose F.C.) ==
Information in this section is sourced from the Football Club History Database.

Season	League	Final position
2003–04	Vale of Glamorgan League Premier Division	4th
2004–05	Vale of Glamorgan League Premier Division	unknown
2005–06	Vale of Glamorgan League Premier Division	unknown
2006–07	Vale of Glamorgan League Premier Division	1st (promoted)
2007–08	South Wales Amateur League Division Two	1st (promoted)
2008–09	South Wales Amateur League Division One	3rd
2009–10	South Wales Amateur League Division One	3rd
2010–11	South Wales Amateur League Division One	9th
2011–12	South Wales Amateur League Division One	5th
2012–13	South Wales Amateur League Division One	1st (promoted)
2013–14	Welsh Football League Division Three	8th
2014–15	Welsh Football League Division Three	5th
