= Tiger Bay F.C. =

Football club based in Cardiff

Tiger Bay
- Full name: Tiger Bay Football Club
- Founded: 2009
- Ground: Canal Park
- League: Cardiff Combination League Premier Division
- 2024–25: Cardiff Combination League Premier, 6th of 9

Tiger Bay F.C. is a Welsh football club based in Butetown, Cardiff. They currently play in the Cardiff Combination League Premier Division.

The club was formed in 2009, entirely by first and second generation Somali immigrants.

They reached the third round of the Welsh Cup in 2014–15, losing 4–0 at home to Caersws.

In 2023–24 the team went unbeaten in the Cardiff Combination League Premier Division, but finished 2nd, three points below champions Cardiff Hibernian.
