= Sully Sports F.C. =

Association football club in Wales

Sully Sports Football Club
- Founded: 1972
- Ground: Sports and Social Club, South Road
- Chairman: Stephen Greenslade
- League: South Wales Premier League Division One West
- 2024–25: South Wales Premier League Division One West, 4th of 11

Sully Sports Football Club are a Welsh football club from Sully in the Vale of Glamorgan, Wales. They play in the South Wales Premier League Division One West.

== History ==
The origins of the football club can be traced to 1950 when "Barry Plastics Sports and Social was born which had no club room, no sports field but plenty of enthusiasm". Events were organised via three prominent employers - Distillers, Goodrich and British Geon. In 1952, Distillers obtained 37.5 acres of ground at the east end of the village of Sully. The covenant on the land was that one third of the ground would be used by the club and the remaining two-thirds would remain agricultural. The agreement was for 10 years. This led to the first sports pitches and a temporary pavilion being erected. In 1962, a permanent building, the Barry Plastics Sports and Social Club pavilion, was erected and formally opened in June.

BP purchased the chemical and plastics interests of The Distillers Company in 1967 and in 1968 took over the Sports and Social Club, supplying subsidies for the various sections including football.

The football club was formed in 1972.

The team as BP Barry joined the South Wales Senior League for the 1992–93 season and were promoted to Division One at the end of the 1997–98 season after finishing as runners-up.

The partnership with BP continued until 1993 when BP Chemicals called a public meeting to discuss their plans to sell half the site for housing and to give the sports club the remainder. Various proposals were considered and BP accepted the Sports and Social Club's proposal to purchase the Market Street and Sully Clubhouses along with their assets for £500,000.

The club changed its name in 2001 to Sully Sports. The club won back-to-back South Wales Senior League titles in the 2005–06 and 2006–07 seasons. The club were turned down for promotion to the Welsh Football League by the Football Association of Wales after the 2005–06 season because of the lack of a permanent stand.

They were again back-to-back champions in the 2011–12 season, where they played South Wales Amateur League champions Llantwit Major in the play-off for promotion to the Welsh Football League but lost the match, and in the 2012–13 season where they lost to Rhoose in the corresponding play-off game.

The club moved to the South Wales Alliance League upon its formation and remained in the Premier Division until the end of the 2019–20 season when they were one of five clubs relegated because of changes to the Welsh Football Pyramid ahead of the 2020–21 season. The 2020–21 season was cancelled due to the COVID-19 pandemic so instead the club's first season in Division One was 2021–22.

== Honours ==
- South Wales Alliance League Premier Division
  - Runners-up: 2015–16
- South Wales Senior League Division One
  - Champions: 2005–06, 2006–07, 2011–12, 2012–13
  - Runners up: 2010–11, 2013–14
- South Wales Senior League Division Two
  - Runners-up: 1997–98 (as BP Barry)
- FAW Trophy
  - Winners: 2011–12
  - Runners-up: 2015–16
- Bruty Cup
  - Winners: 2013–14
- Vale of Glamorgan League
  - Division One – Champions: 2013–14 (reserves)
  - Division One – Champions: 2021-22 (reserves)
