= Gwent Central League =

- Country: Wales
- Number of clubs: 19
- Level on pyramid: 7–8
- Promotion to: Gwent County League Division Two
- Current champions: New Inn (development) (2025–26)
- Website: Gwent Central League website

The Gwent Central League is a football league covering the central part of the preserved county of Gwent. It is affiliated to the Gwent County Football Association. The leagues are at the seventh and eighth levels of the Welsh football league system. It was previously known as the Pontypool & District League, and the North East Gwent League.

== Divisions ==
The league is composed of two divisions.

=== Member clubs 2026–27 ===
==== First Division ====
- Clydach Wasps (reserves)
- Crickhowell (reserves)
- Fairfield United (development)
- Forgeside
- Llanarth
- Mardy (reserves)
- Penygarn & Trevethin
- PILCS (reserves)
- Pontypool Town (withdrew August 2026)
- Race
- Sebastopol
- Tranch

==== Second Division ====
- Forgeside (reserves)
- Mardy (reserves)
- Panteg (reserves)
- Penygarn & Trevethin (development) (withdrew)
- Pontnewynydd (reserves)
- Pontypool Town (reserves)
- Sebastopol (reserves)
- Tranch (reserves)
- Usk Town (reserves)

== Promotion and relegation ==
The league features other teams of clubs with representation at higher levels of the Welsh football pyramid. Promotion from the First Division is to the Gwent County League Division Two may be possible if a team is eligible.

== Champions - Top Division ==
- 1948–49: – Race
- 1960–61: – Blaenavon Blues
- 1961–62: – Blaenavon Blues
- 1966–67: – Blaenavon Blues
- 1967–68: – Llanfoist
- 1968–69: – Race
- 1969–70: – Race
- 1977–78: – Race
- 1980–81: – Usk
- 1981–82: – Race
- 1982–83: – Tranch
- 1983–84: – ICI
- 1984–85: – Llanfoist
- 1985–86: – Fibreglass
- 1986–87: – Trevethin
- 1987–88: – Sebastopol
- 1988–89: – Panteg
- 1989–90: – Llanfoist
- 1990–91: – Llanfoist
- 1991–92: – Llanfoist
- 1992–93: – Blaenavon Blues
- 1993–94: – Mardy
- 1994–95: – Owens Corning
- 1995–96: – Clydach Wasps
- 1996–97: – Blaenavon Blues
- 1997–98: – Goytre
- 1998–99: – Crickhowell
- 1999–00: – Trevethin Old Boys
- 2000–01: – Govilon
- 2001–02: – Govilon
- 2002–03: – Pilcs
- 2003–04: – Sebastopol
- 2004–05: – Crickhowell
- 2005–06: – Tranch
- 2006–07: – Govilon
- 2007–08: – Trevethin
- 2008–09: – Trevethin
- 2009–10: – Trevethin
- 2010–11: – Llanarth
- 2011–12: – Panteg
- 2012–13: – Llanarth
- 2013–14: – Wainfelin Bluebirds
- 2014–15: – Penygarn & Trevethin
- 2015–16: – Crickhowell
- 2016–17: – Usk Town
- 2017–18: – Tranch
- 2018–19: – Gilwern and District
- 2019–20: – Cwmffrwdoer Sports
- 2020–21: – Season cancelled due to Covid-19 pandemic
- 2021–22: – Mardy
- 2022–23: – Pontypool Town
- 2023–24: – Pontnewynydd
- 2024–25: – Fairfield United
- 2025–26: – New Inn (development)

== Cup Competitions ==
This league currently runs three different knock out cup competitions for its member clubs:

Open Cup: All league teams (from both Division One & Two) are eligible to compete in this competition - which is the league's premier knockout cup competition.

Langdon Cup: All Division One teams are eligible to compete in this cup competition.

Benevolent Cup: All Division Two teams are eligible to compete in this cup competition.

=== Lists of cup winners since 1980–81 season ===
Open Cup

- 1980 - 81: - Usk Town
- 1981 - 82: - Race
- 1982 - 83: - ICI Sports
- 1983 - 84: - ICI Sports
- 1984 - 85: - Clydach Wasps
- 1985 - 86: - New Inn United
- 1986 - 87: - Usk Town
- 1987 - 88: - Panteg
- 1988 - 89: - Abergavenny Thursdays
- 1989 - 90: - Abergavenny Thursdays
- 1990 - 91: - Pontypool Town
- 1991 - 92: - Llanfoist
- 1992 - 93: - Blaenavon Blues
- 1993 - 94: - Fairfield
- 1994 - 95: - Llanarth
- 1995 - 96: - Fairfield United
- 1996 - 97: - Pontypool Town
- 1997 - 98: - Crickhowell
- 1998 - 99: - Crickhowell
- 1999–2000: - Govilon
- 2000 - 01: - Govilon
- 2001 - 02: - Govilon
- 2002 - 03: - PILCS
- 2003 - 04: - Gilwern & District
- 2004 - 05: - (Competition Abandoned)
- 2005 - 06: - Blaenavon Blues
- 2006 - 07: - Govilon
- 2007 - 08: - Clydach Wasps
- 2008 - 09: - Trevethin
- 2009 - 10: - Llanarth
- 2010 - 11: - Govilon
- 2011 - 12: - Usk Town
- 2012 - 13: - (Competition Abandoned)
- 2013 - 14: - Gilwern & District
- 2014 - 15: - Penygarn & Trevethin
- 2015 - 16: - Usk Town
- 2016 - 17: - Tranch
- 2017 - 18: - Tranch
- 2018 - 19: - Blaenavon Blues
- 2019 - 20: - (Competition Abandoned Due To Covid-19)
- 2020 - 21: - (Competition Cancelled Due To Covid-19)
- 2021 - 22: - Pontypool Town
- 2022 - 23: - Pontypool Town
- 2023 - 24: - Fairfield United
- 2024 - 25: - Crickhowell
- 2025 - 26: - Sebastopol

Langdon Cup

- 1980 - 81: - Race
- 1981 - 82: - Sebastopol
- 1982 - 83: - Tranch
- 1983 - 84: - ICI Sports
- 1984 - 85: - Griffithstown
- 1985 - 86: - Trevethin
- 1986 - 87: - Mardy
- 1987 - 88: - Sebastopol
- 1988 - 89: - Panteg
- 1989 - 90: - Clydach Wasps
- 1990 - 91: - Llanfoist
- 1991 - 92: - New Inn
- 1992 - 93: - Goytre
- 1993 - 94: - Goytre
- 1994 - 95: - Pontypool Town
- 1995 - 96: - Fairfield United
- 1996 - 97: - Goytre
- 1997 - 98: - Goytre
- 1998 - 99: - Pontypool Town
- 1999–2000: - Owens Corning
- 2000 - 01: - Govilon
- 2001 - 02: - Owens Corning
- 2002 - 03: - Usk Town
- 2003 - 04: - Llanarth
- 2004 - 05: - Blaenavon Blues
- 2005 - 06: - Goytre
- 2006 - 07: - Clydach Wasps
- 2007 - 08: - Trevethin
- 2008 - 09: - Goytre
- 2009 - 10: - Trevethin
- 2010 - 11: - Llanarth
- 2011 - 12: - Llanarth
- 2012 - 13: - Llanarth
- 2013 - 14: - Crickhowell
- 2014 - 15: - Gilwern & District
- 2015 - 16: - Gilwern & District
- 2016 - 17: - Usk Town
- 2017 - 18: - Tranch
- 2018 - 19: - Pontypool Town
- 2019 - 20: - (Competition Abandoned Due To Covid-19)
- 2020 - 21: - (Competition Cancelled Due To Covid-19)
- 2021 - 22: - Mardy
- 2022 - 23: - Pontypool Town
- 2023 - 24: - Crickhowell
- 2024 - 25: - Race
- 2025 - 26: - New Inn (development)

Benevolent Cup

- 1980 - 81: - Griffithstown
- 1981 - 82: - Teazer
- 1982 - 83: - Usk
- 1983 - 84: - Rangers
- 1984 - 85: - Bailey Park Rangers
- 1985 - 86: - Fairfield
- 1986 - 87: - Gilwern & District
- 1987 - 88: - Kings Head
- 1988 - 89: - Gilwern & District
- 1989 - 90: - Race
- 1990 - 91: - New Inn
- 1991 - 92: - Little Mill
- 1992 - 93: - Govilon United
- 1993 - 94: - Mardy
- 1994 - 95: - Owens Corning B
- 1995 - 96: - Blaenavon Blues B
- 1996 - 97: - Waterloo
- 1997 - 98: - Clydach Wasps
- 1998 - 99: - Llanarth B
- 1999–2000: - Trevethin Old Boys
- 2000 - 01: - Owens Corning B
- 2001 - 02: - Trevethin Old Boys
- 2002 - 03: - Blaenavon Blues B
- 2003 - 04: - Blaenavon Blues B
- 2004 - 05: - Crickhowell B
- 2005 - 06: - Pandy
- 2006 - 07: - Fairfield United
- 2007 - 08: - Pontypool Town
- 2008 - 09: - Clydach Wasps
- 2009 - 10: - Clydach Wasps
- 2010 - 11: - Clydach Wasps
- 2011 - 12: - Cwmffrwdoer
- 2012 - 13: - Wainfelin Bluebirds
- 2013 - 14: - Gilwern & District
- 2014 - 15: - Crickhowell B
- 2015 - 16: - Gilwern & District B
- 2016 - 17: - Fairfield United
- 2017 - 18: - Blaenavon Blues B
- 2018 - 19: - Mardy
- 2019 - 20: - (Competition Abandoned Due To Covid-19)
- 2020 - 21: - (Competition Cancelled Due To Covid-19)
- 2021 - 22: - Tranch
- 2022 - 23: - PILCS
- 2023 - 24: - Cwmffrwdoer Reserves
- 2024 - 25: - Glascoed
- 2025 - 26: - Penygarn & Trevethin
