= Cardiff & District League =

- Founded: 1897
- Country: Wales
- Number of clubs: 26
- Level on pyramid: 7–9
- Promotion to: South Wales Premier League
- Current champions: Splott Albion (2025–26)
- Current: 2026–27

The Cardiff & District League is a football league covering the city of Cardiff and surrounding areas in South Wales. The leagues are at the seventh to ninth levels of the Welsh football league system.

== Area of the league ==
Clubs within the bounds of St Mellons, Rumney, Tremorfa, Splott, The Docks, Llandough, Bonvilston, Peterstone, Super Ely, Radyr, Pentyrch, Gwaelod y Garth, Taffs Well, Thornhill, Lisvane, Cyncoed, Pentwyn and Llanrumney are eligible to apply to play in the league.

== Divisions ==
The league is composed of three divisions.

=== Member clubs 2026–27 ===
==== Premier Division ====
- Canton Rangers
- Cardiff Bay
- Clwb Cymric Ail Dim
- Clwb Sparta
- Cwrt Y Vil
- Grangetown Catholic OB
- Splott Albion
- St Josephs
- St Mellons

==== Division One ====
- Avenue Hotspur
- Cardiff Academicals
- Cardiff Allstars
- Grange Albion (reserves)
- Llanrumney Athletic
- Llanrumney United Reserves
- Pentyrch Rangers (development)
- Splott Albion (seconds)
- Tongwynlais (reserves)

==== Division Two ====
- AFC Whitchurch (reserves)
- Canton Rangers (reserves)
- Cardiff All Stars (reserves)
- Clwb Sparta (reserves)
- Ely Rangers (reserves)
- Grangetown Catholic OB (reserves)
- Llanrumney Athletic (development)
- Llanrumney United (district)

== Promotion and relegation ==
Promotion from the Premier Division is possible to the lowest tier of the South Wales Premier League, with the champion of the league playing the other tier 7 champions from the South Wales regional leagues via play-off games to determine promotion.

== Champions (top flight division) ==
- 1901–02: – Cardiff Albion
- 1904–05: – Barry Dock Albions
- 1905–06: – Roath Park Old Boys
- 1908–09: – Gordon's FC
- 1930–31: – Barry Amateurs
- 1931–32: – Barry Amateurs
- 1946–47: – Grange Albion
- 1959–60: – Docks Albion
- 1960–61: – Docks Albion
- 1961–62: – Docks Albion
- 1962–63: – Cardiff Cosmos
- 1963–64: – Canton Athletic
- 1964–65: – St Patrick's
- 1965–66: – St Patrick's
- 1966–67: – St Patrick's
- 1967–68: – St Patrick's
- 1968–69: – St Patrick's
- 1969–70: – St Patrick's
- 1970–71: – St Patrick's
- 1971–72: – St Patrick's
- 1972–73: – St Patrick's
- 1973–74: – St Patrick's
- 1974–75: – St Patrick's
- 1975–76: – St Patrick's
- 1976–77: – Cardiff Rovers
- 1981–82: – Bridgend Street
- 1983–84: – Grange Quins
- 1984–85: – Bridgend Street
- 1985–86: – Bridgend Street
- 1986–87: – Bridgend Street
- 1987–88: – Grange Albion
- 1988–89: – Grange Albion
- 1991–92: – Trelai YC
- 1992–93: – St Joseph's
- 1993–94: – Bridgend Street
- 1995–96: – Llanrumney AFC
- 2000–01: – Fairwater SS
- 2001–02:
- 2002–03:
- 2003–04:
- 2004–05:
- 2005–06: – Clwb Cymric
- 2006–07: – Pentwyn Dynamo reserves
- 2007–08: – Grangetown Catholics Old Boys
- 2008–09: – St. Albans
- 2009–10: – Clwb Cymric
- 2010–11: – Canton Liberal
- 2011–12: – Clwb Cymric
- 2012–13: – Canton Liberal
- 2013–14: – Cardiff Cosmopolitan
- 2014–15: – Cardiff Cosmopolitan
- 2015–16: – Creigiau
- 2016–17: – Pentwyn Dynamo
- 2017–18: – AFC Rumney Juniors
- 2018–19: – Canton Rangers
- 2019–20: – Tongwynlais
- 2020–21: – Season void
- 2021–22: – Tongwynlais (promoted via SWAL playoff)
- 2022–23: – Star
- 2023–24: – Splott Cons
- 2024–25: – Pentyrch Rangers (promoted via SWPL playoff)
- 2025–26: – Splott Albion
- 2026–27: –
