= Abercarn United A.F.C. =

Association football club in Wales

Coordinates: 51°38′20″N 3°8′9″W

Abercarn United
- Founded: 1997
- Ground: Abercarn Welfare Ground
- Capacity: 100
- Manager: Rhys Iles
- League: Ardal SE League
- 2025–26: Ardal SE League, 14th of 16
Home colours	Away colours

Abercarn United Football Club is a Welsh football team based in Abercarn, Caerphilly County Borough, Wales. They currently play in the Ardal SE League.

== History ==
=== Earlier clubs ===
There was an Abercarn Association Football Club active in 1909 and 1910.

An Abercarn team played in the 1921–22 FA Cup, losing to Llanhilleth in the extra preliminary round. Abercarn FC still existed by 1925–26.

=== Abercarn Town ===
Abercarn Town were Newport and District Football League champions in 1992–93 and 1993–94.

=== Abercarn Rangers ===
Abercarn Rangers existed as early as the 1950s. They won the Junior Cup in 1985–86 and a double in 1987–88 of the Newport and District Football League Premier X and the Senior Bowl Cup. From 1988 onwards they played in the Gwent County League.

=== Abercarn United ===
Abercarn United was formed in 1997 via the merger of Abercarn Town and Abercarn Rangers. They initially played in the Gwent County League Second Division, but by 2000 they had reached Division One, the top division of the league. They played in the top tier of the Gwent County League continuously from then, winning the County Motors Challenge Cup in 2015–16 and 2021–22, until a second-place finish in 2022–23 gained them promotion to the Ardal South East. In their first season in the Ardal Leagues they finished 14th out of 16 teams, but avoided relegation due to Aberbargoed Buds' withdrawal.

== Honours ==
=== Abercarn Town ===
- Newport and District Football League Premier X – Champions: 1992–93, 1993–94

=== Abercarn Rangers ===
- Newport and District Football League Premier X – Champions: 1987–88
- Junior Cup – Winners: 1985–86
- Senior Bowl Cup – Winners: 1987–88

=== Abercarn United ===
- Gwent County League Premier Division – Runners-up: 2022–23
- Gwent Premier League County Motors Cup – Winners: 2015–16, 2021–22
