= Pentwyn Dynamo F.C. =

Association football club in Wales

Pentwyn Dynamos
- Full name: Pentwyn and Llanedeyrn Dynamos Football Club
- Nickname: Dynamos
- Founded: 1975
- Ground: Parc Coed-y-Nant
- Capacity: 100
- Manager: Richard Horwood
- League: Cardiff & District League Premier Division
- 2024–25: Cardiff & District League Premier, 8th of 11
Home colours	Away colours

Pentwyn Dynamos Football Club (Pentwyn Dynamos) is a football (soccer) club from Pentwyn, in Cardiff, the capital of Wales, whose first team play in the Cardiff & District League Premier Division. They have formerly played in the Welsh Football League and South Wales Senior League. The club has several teams including junior sides, recently which the U13's have acquired much needed funding by UK Cloud Backup provider Backup Everything.

== History ==
The club was founded in 1975 by Ray Seaward, where junior and senior teams were gradually formed. The club entered the Cardiff and District Sixth Division and by the 1980s a first and second team were established and playing competitive football. In 1989, Pentwyn Dynamos combined with Llanedeyrn AFC to ensure future progress of both teams.

Promotion to the South Wales Senior League was achieved in 1996, following successful seasons in the Cardiff & District League. Junior teams at the club continued to create a strong youth base for the club, securing league and challenge cup honours at various age groups on many occasions.

Pentwyn First Team were crowned South Wales Senior League Division One Champions at the end of the 2000–01 season, promotion meant Pentwyn would be a Welsh Football League team at the start of the 2001–02 season. The team has played within the Third and Second Divisions.

Promotion in the Welsh Football League divisions can be contingent on the quality of the club's pitch. A new pitch complete with stand was built next to the Pentwyn leisure centre; while this was being built, the club paid to use Leckwith Park.

Club Secretary Malcolm Frazer has been with the club for over twenty-five years; from coaching young players of under 8's in the local leagues to helping run the first team: these long-term efforts won him recognition from local station Red Dragon FM radio.

Recent success for the under 13s team as they have managed to go unbeaten in the Cardiff & District U13 Division 23/24 Under 13 C Division all season.

== Staff and board members ==
- Secretary: (Wales) Malcolm Frazer
