= Newport and District Football League =

- Founded: 1901
- Country: Wales
- Number of clubs: 42
- Level on pyramid: 7–9
- Promotion to: Gwent County League
- Domestic cup(s): Senior Challenge Bowl; Junior Challenge Cup; Sunday Challenge Cup; Challenge Plate
- Current champions: Graig Villa Dino (reserves) (2025–26)
- Website: Newport AFL
- Current: 2026–27

The Newport and District Football League (currently billed as The Monmouthshire Building Society Newport and District Football League for sponsorship reasons) is a football league covering the city of Newport and surrounding areas in South Wales. The headquarters are located at Newport Civic Centre.

== Area ==
The League's area consists of the city of Newport and the surrounding part of the historic county of Monmouthshire as far west as the county boundary at Bedwas, as far north-west as Abercarn and Wattsville, as far north-east as Sebastopol Bridge, and as far east as Llanwern, and Nash.

== Member clubs 2026–27 and divisions ==
The league is composed of four divisions. The top-level consists of a premier division split into "Premier X" and "Premier Y", and two feeder divisions numbered one and two.

=== Premier 'X' ===
- Bedwas
- Caerleon Town
- Cromwell Youth
- Llanyrafon
- Maesglas
- Maindee United
- Newport Panthers
- Risca Town
- Spencer Boys

=== Premier 'Y' ===
- AFC Pontymister (reserves)
- Albion Rovers (reserves)
- Caerleon (reserves)
- Cwmcarn Athletic (reserves)
- Graig Villa Dino (reserves)
- Newport Corinthians (thirds)
- Newport Saints (reserves)
- Pill (reserves)
- Ponthir (reserves)
- Riverside Rovers (reserves)
- Rogerstone (thirds)
- Sifil (reserves)

=== Division One ===
- Albion Rovers (development)
- Caerleon (thirds)
- Coed Eva Athletic (reserves) (withdrew)
- Graig Villa Dino (thirds)
- Machen (reserves)
- Maesglas (reserves)
- Newport Corinthians (fourths)
- Pontnewydd United (reserves)
- Rogerstone (fourths) (withdrew)
- Spencer Boys (reserves)
- Young Valley Colts

=== Division Two ===
- Afon Valley
- Bedwas (reserves)
- Caerleon Town (reserves)
- Graig Villa Dino (fourths)
- Llanyrafon (development)
- Mill Street Dynamo
- Newport Eagles
- Newport Eagles (reserves)
- Newport Saints (thirds)
- Risca Town (development)
- River Usk
- Spencer Boys (development)

== Promotion and relegation ==
The Premier 'X' Division champions (or runners-up if the champions do not meet ground criteria) are promoted to the Gwent County League. Promotion and relegation also applies to the two bottom clubs of Division One and the two top clubs of Division Two. Promotion to the Premier Division from Division One and relegation from the Premier Division is at the discretion of the league's Executive Committee. Clubs requesting places in the Premier Division will be interviewed by the Executive Committee.

== Champions (Top Division) ==
Information provided by the league.

=== Pre 1950s ===
- 1903–04: – Tydu Oddfellows
- 1904–05: – Orb W.M.C.
- 1905–06: – Orb W.M.C.
- 1949–50: – Beechwood

=== 1950s ===
- 1950–51: – Caerleon
- 1951–52: – St. Julians
- 1952–53: – Caerleon
- 1953–54: – St. Julians
- 1954–55: – St. Julians
- 1955–56: – St. Julians
- 1956–57: – Central YMCA
- 1957–58: – Central YMCA
- 1958–59: – Maesglas
- 1959–60: – Docks United

=== 1960s ===
- 1960–61: – Maesglas
- 1961–62: – S.T.C.
- 1962–63: – Christchurch
- 1963–64: – Cashmore Corries
- 1964–65: – Cashmore Corries
- 1965–66: – Christchurch
- 1966–67: – Christchurch
- 1967–68: – Pontnewydd
- 1968–69: – Ebbw Bridge Hibernians
- 1969–70: – Cwmbran R. C.

=== 1970s ===
- 1970–71: – Ebbw Bridge Hibernians
- 1971–72: – Central YMCA
- 1972–73: – Central YMCA
- 1973–74: – Brynglas Dynamo
- 1974–75: – B. R. S.
- 1975–76: – Spencer BC
- 1976–77: – Spencer BC
- 1977–78: – Spencer BC
- 1978–79: – Lliswerry
- 1979–80: – Spencer BC

=== 1980s ===
- 1980–81: – Spencer BC
- 1981–82: – Pill
- 1982–83: – Crindau United
- 1983–84: – Lliswerry
- 1984–85: – Malpas Unionists
- 1985–86: – Pill
- 1986–87: – Malpas
- 1987–88: – Abercarn Rangers
- 1988–89: – Golden Harvester
- 1989–90: – Golden Harvester

=== 1990s ===
- 1990–91: – Golden Harvester
- 1991–92: – Greenmeadow
- 1992–93: – Abercarn Town
- 1993–94: – Abercarn Town
- 1994–95: – Girlings
- 1995–96: – West Pontnewydd
- 1996–97: – Cromwell
- 1997–98: – Bettws Social
- 1998–99: – Greenmeadow
- 1999–00: – Bettws Social

=== 2000s ===
- 2000–01: – Bettws Social
- 2001–02: – Marshfield
- 2002–03: – Pill Hibernians
- 2003–04: – Caerleon Town
- 2004–05: – Pioneer
- 2005–06: – Pioneer
- 2006–07: – Pioneer
- 2007–08: – Llanwern RTB
- 2008–09: – Marshfield
- 2009–10: – Marshfield

=== 2010s ===
- 2010–11: – K-2
- 2011–12: – Ponthir
- 2012–13: – Pontnewydd United
- 2013–14: – West of St Julians
- 2014–15: – Villa Dino Christchurch
- 2015–16: – Machen
- 2016–17: – Cwmcarn Athletic
- 2017–18: – Cromwell Youth
- 2018–19: – Whiteheads Rhisga
- 2019–20: – Riverside Rovers

=== 2020s ===
- 2020–21: – No competition due to Covid-19 pandemic
- 2021–22: – Marshfield
- 2022–23: – Marshfield
- 2023–24: – Alway
- 2024–25: – Pill reserves
- 2025–26: – Graig Villa Dino (reserves)
