= STM Sports F.C. =

Former association football club in Wales

STM Sports
- Full name: STM Sports Association Football Club
- Founded: 2007
- Dissolved: 2020
- Ground: Cardiff University Playing Fields, Cardiff

STM Sports Association Football Club was a Welsh football club. They were based in St Mellons, Cardiff and played at Cardiff University Sports fields.

== History ==
=== Regional leagues ===
The club was formed mostly from players of Cardiff Cosmos Portos, coupled with players from Sunday League side Willows FC. They played originally in the Cardiff Combination League, before moving to the South Wales Amateur League for the 2010–11 season where they were crowned Division Two champions at their first attempt. The following season in Division One saw the club finish seventh position, whilst the following year saw them finish in fifth position and also saw them win the South Wales FA Senior Cup.

The 2013–14 season saw them finish in fourth place, with promotion to the Welsh Football League obtained at the end of 2014–15 season, finishing as Champions. The club had to lodge an appeal with the Football Association of Wales to secure promotion and then defeated Pontlottyn 4–1 at Cardiff City Stadium in the SWFA promotion play-off. The match also featured the unusual situation of one of the club's players being arrested during the match by police officers for an outstanding charge of assault and failing to answer to court.

=== Welsh Football League ===
In the first season in Division Three, the club finished in fourth place before improving on that for the 2016–17 season, finishing second to Llantwit Major and gaining promotion to Division Two. In their first season in Division Two the club finished in fourth place, before being crowned champions in the 2018–19 season. The season included a record 20–0 Welsh League Cup away win over Caerau which saw five STM Sports players score hat-tricks.

The team also reached the semi-final of the FAW Trophy before losing in extra time to Cefn Albion in a match that was marred by claims of racism against two STM Sports players by supporters of Cefn Albion. Both clubs were later charged by FA Wales in relation to potential offences in relation to the match.

=== Cymru South ===
As Division Two champions, the club was eligible for promotion to the newly established Cymru South. The club was informed by the Football Association of Wales (FAW) in May 2019 that they had not been awarded tier 2 certification to be eligible to play at that level, and were given the right of appeal. The club won their appeal later in May. In the first season in tier 2, the club's season was curtailed by the COVID-19 pandemic which led to the suspension of all football in Wales and curtailment of the season. The club finished in sixth position after a decision was made to determine final places on a points per game (PPG) basis by the FAW.

At the end of the season, the club was informed by the Football Association of Wales that they had not been successful in gaining a tier 2 domestic licence for the forthcoming season. Despite appealing this decision, the club lost their appeal, and were therefore told they must compete in the newly established tier 3 structure for 2020–21. The club were placed in the new Ardal Leagues South West when it was announced in July 2020.

=== Closure of the club ===
On 27 July 2020 it was announced that the club would not play in the 2020–21 season, and would dissolve.

== Honours ==
- Welsh League Cup – Runners-up: 2019–20
- Welsh Football League Division Two – Champions: 2018–19
- Welsh Football League Division Three – Runners-up: 2016–17
- South Wales Amateur League Division One – Champions: 2014–15
- South Wales Amateur League Division Two – Champions: 2010–11
- Cardiff Combination League Premier Division – Champions: 2009–10
- Cardiff Combination League Division One – Runners-up: 2008–09
- Cardiff Combination League Division Two – Runners-up: 2007–08
- South Wales FA Senior Cup – Winners: 2012–13

== Management history ==
- Nathan Cadette (July 2015 – May 2017)
- Gareth Morgan (May 2017) – January 2018)
- Dale Gardiner [Player/ Manager] (January 2018 – ?)
- Nana Baah [Manager] (July 2019 - July 2020)

== Seasons ==
Season	Pyramid Tier	League							Welsh Cup	FAW Trophy	Other
Season	Pyramid Tier	Division	P	W	D	L	Pts	Pos	Welsh Cup	FAW Trophy	Other
2007-08	9	Cardiff Combination League Division Two	20	18	1	1	55	2			
2008-09	8	Cardiff Combination League Division One	20	17	1	2	52	2			
2009-10	7	Cardiff Combination League Premier Division	20					1			
2010-11	6	South Wales Amateur League, Division Two	28	23	1	4	70	1	R1		
2011-12	5	South Wales Amateur League, Division One	28	12	4	12	40	7	1Q		
2012-13	5	South Wales Amateur League, Division One	30	15	3	12	48	5	1Q		South Wales FA Senior Cup Winners
2013-14	5	South Wales Amateur League, Division One	30	17	6	7	57	4			
2014-15	5	South Wales Amateur League, Division One	24	17	5	2	56	1	R1		
2015-16	4	Welsh Football League Division Three	34	21	4	9	67	4			
2016-17	4	Welsh Football League Division Three	20	21	4	5	64	2	2Q		
2017-18	3	Welsh Football League Division Two	30	18	6	6	60	4	R2	R2	
2018-19	3	Welsh Football League Division Two	29	21	4	4	67	1	R1	SF	
2019-20	2	Cymru South	22	12	3	7	39	6	R3		Nathaniel MG Cup Runner Up

Notes

- 1Q: First qualifying round
- 2Q: Second qualifying round
- R1: First Round
- R2: Second Round
- SF: Semi Final
