= Welsh football clubs in English competitions =

Many Welsh football clubs have played in English football competitions. The League of Wales was founded in 1992, and before then there was no national league or formal league system within Wales, leading the top Welsh clubs away from Welsh leagues.

As of 2026, five Welsh football clubs play in the English football league system: Cardiff City, Swansea City, Wrexham, Newport County and Merthyr Town. Only Cardiff, Swansea, Wrexham, and Newport play in the EFL. Most recently, Colwyn Bay played in the English league system until they joined the Cymru North in 2019.

Welsh football clubs playing in the English league system can only qualify for UEFA competitions through English competitions.

== Early days ==
The FAW is the third oldest football association in the world, having been formed in 1876. Despite this, they did not form a national league for over 100 years after the FAW was founded. This led Wales's leading clubs to join English competitions such as the Southern Football League, and later the Football League. Six football clubs based in Wales joined the Football League – five still exist in the English league system today in some form – the sixth being Aberdare Athletic who played in the Football League for six seasons in the 1920s. In 1927, Cardiff City won the FA Cup. This remains the only time a Welsh club has won the FA Cup.

== 1992–present ==
The League of Wales was founded in October 1991 by Alun Evans and was first played in the 1992–93 season. The first season of the league was largely made up of teams from the previous season's Cymru Alliance (North Wales) and Welsh Football League National Division (South Wales) due to a dispute between the FAW and eight of its clubs, dubbed the 'Irate Eight'. The eight clubs were Bangor City, Barry Town, Caernarfon Town, Colwyn Bay, Merthyr Tydfil, Newport AFC, Newtown and Rhyl. Three other clubs (Cardiff City, Swansea City and Wrexham) were allowed to stay in the English league system as they played in the Football League at the time. The FAW told the 'Irate Eight' that if they wanted to stay in the English league system they would have to play their home games in England. However, only two of the 'Irate Eight', Bangor City and Newtown, joined the new League of Wales, and Rhyl joined the second-tier Cymru Alliance. Merthyr Tydfil were exempt due to playing in the fifth-tier Football Conference but the remaining four of the 'Irate Eight' had to groundshare with English teams. Barry Town played at Worcester (as Barri), Caernarfon played at Curzon Ashton, Colwyn Bay played at Northwich Victoria's Drill Field, and Newport played in Moreton-in-Marsh. The following season Barry Town reverted to their previous name and joined the Welsh Football League Division One, at the second tier of the Welsh league system.

In 1995, the dispute was solved at High Court, as the three remaining clubs (Caernarfon, Colwyn Bay and Newport) successfully sued the FAW and were allowed to play in Wales without leaving the English league system. However just four months later Caernarfon decided to join the League of Wales for the 1995–96 season.

In 2010, Merthyr Tydfil were liquidated. The phoenix club Merthyr Town were allowed to join the Western Football League First Division, which they won at the first attempt, achieving promotion to the Premier Division. Merthyr went on to win the Premier Division in the following season.

In 2019, Colwyn Bay left the English league system after 35 years, joining the newly formed Cymru North, at the second tier of Welsh football.

In 2025, Merthyr Town were offered £6 million to join the expanded Cymru Premier for the 2025–26 season. However Merthyr rejected this offer, and were promoted to the National League North for the 2025–26 season.

=== Seasons in English League tiers ===
Total Seasons	Club	First tier			Second tier			Third tier			Fourth tier		
Total Seasons	Club	Seasons	First	Last	Seasons	First	Last	Seasons	First	Last	Seasons	First	Last
100	Cardiff City	17	1921/22	2018/19	53	1920/21	Current	20	1931/32	2025/26	10	1986/87	2000/01
100	Swansea City	9	1981/82	2017/18	46	1925/26	Current	27	1920/21	2007/08	18	1967/68	2004/05
84	Wrexham				6	1978/79	Current	55	1921/22	2024/25	23	1960/61	2023/24
74	Newport County				1	1946/47	1946/47	40	1920/21	2007/08	33	1962/63	Current
10	Merthyr Town							10	1920/21	1929/30			
6	Aberdare Athletic							6	1921/22	1926/27			

== FA Cup ==
The FA Cup is the main cup competition in English football. Despite the existence of the Welsh Cup, many Welsh teams have played in the FA Cup, and many English teams have played in the Welsh Cup.

In 1986, it was decided that only 14 Welsh clubs would be chosen to compete in the FA Cup and FA Trophy; previously any Welsh team could enter. In 1992, all teams in the Welsh league system were banned from entering FA competitions due to the founding of the League of Wales.

In 1927, Cardiff City became the only Welsh team to win the FA Cup, a record that stands today. In January 1992, Wrexham famously upset Arsenal, beating them 2–1 in what came to be widely known as one of the greatest giant-killings in FA Cup history.

== UEFA qualification ==
Football clubs based in Wales that play in the English leagues cannot qualify for UEFA competitions through the Welsh Cup. They were originally banned from the cup for the 1995–96 season, but this ban was briefly lifted for the 2011–12 season. During the existence of the European Cup Winners' Cup, the Welsh Cup winners were allowed in the tournament even if they played in the English leagues, but not if they were based in England.

In 2025, it was planned that they could qualify for UEFA competitions through the Welsh League Cup, in a proposal known as Prosiect Cymru (meaning Project Wales in Welsh), however the FA blocked the plan.

=== English league teams in Europe ===
In 2013, Swansea City became the first Welsh team to play in the Europa League, and also the first Welsh team to qualify for Europe through the English league system.

=== Welsh league teams in Europe ===
In 2025, The New Saints became the first team from the Welsh league system to reach the group stage or league phase of a UEFA tournament, after qualifying for the UEFA Conference League. The New Saints themselves are based in Oswestry in England, and have played there at Park Hall Stadium since 2007.

== See also ==
- List of EFL Cup finals
