= Trethomas Bluebirds A.F.C. =

Association football club in Wales

Trethomas Bluebirds
- Full name: Trethomas Bluebirds A.F.C.
- Nickname: Bluebirds
- Founded: 1903
- Ground: CCB Centre For Sporting Excellence, Hengoed
- Manager: Paul Evans
- League: Cymru South
- 2025–26: Cymru South, 13th of 16

Trethomas Bluebirds A.F.C. are a Welsh football team based in the village Trethomas in the Caerphilly County Borough. The club plays in the Cymru South.

== History ==
The club was formed in 1903 as Trethomas Football Club. The pitch was bought by the miners who worked at the mine and coke works of Bedwas & Trethomas. The name Bluebirds came from one of the founders who was a Cardiff City supporter. The club entered the Gwent County League in 2003, winning promotion to Division Two as Champions in 2005–06. Promotion to Division One followed after the club finished as runners-up in the 2012–13 season.

They were promoted to the Welsh Football League in 2015–16 for the first time.

On 1 July 2026, former Cardiff City player Michael Chopra came out of retirement to sign for the club.

== Honours ==
- Cymru South Runners–up (1): 2024–25
- Ardal SE Champions (1): 2023–24
- Gwent County League Division One Champions (1): 2015–16
- Gwent County League Division Two Runners-up (1): 2012–13
- Gwent County League Division Three Champions (1): 2005–06
- Ardal South Cup – Winners: 2021–22
- FAW Trophy – Winners: 2022–23
- Gwent Premier League County Motors Cup – Winners: 2011–12
