= Clydach Wasps F.C. =

Welsh football club

Clydach Wasps
- Full name: Clydach Wasps Football Club
- Nickname: Wasps
- Founded: 1977
- Ground: Clydach Recreation Ground
- League: Gwent County League Premier Division
- 2025–26: Gwent County League Premier Division, 11th of 16
- Website: Club website
Home colours	Away colours

Clydach Wasps F.C. is a Welsh football club based in Clydach, Monmouthshire. They currently play in the Gwent County League Premier Division.

The team has played in the Welsh Cup qualifying rounds on multiple occasions.

== Honours ==
- FAW Trophy - Runners-up: 2009–10
- Gwent County League Division One (level 1) - Champions: 2004–05
- Gwent County League Division One (level 2) - Runners-up: 2022–23
- Gwent County League Division Two (level 2) - Champions: 1999–2000
- Gwent Central League – Champions: 1995–96
- Gwent Central League Open Cup – Winners: 2007–08
- Gwent Central League Langdon Cup – Winners: 1989–90, 2006–07
- Gwent Central League Benevolent Cup - Winners: 1997–98, 2008–09, 2009–10, 2010–11
- Hay Challenge Cup - Winners: 2023, 2025
