= Grange Albion F.C. =

Association football club in Wales

Grange Albion
- Full name: Grange Albion Association Football Club
- Founded: 1942
- Ground: Coronation Park, Cardiff
- League: South Wales Premier League Division One West
- 2025–26: South Wales Premier League Division One West, 8th of 12

Grange Albion Association Football Club is a Welsh football team based in Grangetown, Cardiff, Wales. They play in the South Wales Premier League Division One West.

== History ==
The football team was formed in 1942 by the merger of Stockland Rovers (who had been a formidable junior team in the 1930s), merged with players of the Grange Albion baseball team to form Grange Albion AFC.

The 1946–47 season saw the club finish as undefeated winners of the First Division of the Cardiff & District League. They also won the Lord Ninian Stuart Cup in the same season. In the 1949–50 season Grange Albion became the first Cardiff & District team to win the South Wales & Monmouthshire Amateur Cup, a feat which they repeated in 1988 and 2001. During the 1950s they also spent time in the South Wales Amateur League having gained promotion from the local Cardiff and District League.

The 1987–88 season was one of the most successful in the club's history as it won both the Cardiff & District Premier Division and the SWFA Intermediate Cup as well as being runners-up in the Lord Ninian Stuart Cup

Grange Albion went on to retain the Premier Division title in 1988–89. The 1989–90 season brought further success with another appearance in the SWFA Intermediate Cup Final while the reserve team won both the Cardiff & District First Division title and the Greyhound Cup.

In 1991, Grange Albion joined the newly established South Wales Senior League and in the first season they won the League's C.W. Bruty Cup with a 4–1 win over Tredomen Athletic at Somerton Park, Newport. The club have gone on to win the C.W. Bruty Cup on two further occasions, in 1995 against Caerau Ely and in 2011 against Cogan Coronation.

Over the years a number of former players have gone on to play professionally including Fred Stansfield, Graham Vearncombe, David Giles, Matteo Pulvirenti and Melvyn Rees.

== Honours ==
- South Wales Senior League Division Two - Runner-up: 2001–02
- Cardiff & District League Premier Division - Champions: 1987–88; 1988–89
- Cardiff & District League First Division - Champions: 1946–47; 1989-90 (reserves)
- Lord Ninian Stuart Cup – Winners: 1946–47
- Lord Ninian Stuart Cup – Runners-up: 1987–88
- South Wales & Monmouthshire Amateur Cup/ South Wales Intermediate Cup – Winners: 1949–50; 1987–88; 2000–01.
- C.W. Bruty Cup – Winners: 1991–92; 1994–95; 2010–11
