= Welsh football league system =

Series of association football leagues in Wales

The Welsh football league system (or pyramid) is a series of football leagues with regular promotion and relegation between them.

It consists of four main tiers, as well as lower local leagues.

While most Welsh clubs play in the Welsh pyramid and most clubs in that pyramid are Welsh, five Welsh clubs play in English leagues, and four English clubs play in Welsh leagues.

== Structure of Welsh football ==
=== Tier 1: Cymru Premier ===
At the top is the Cymru Premier, which is the only national league in Wales and is run by the Football Association of Wales.

=== Tier 2: Cymru North and Cymru South ===
Following a review of the Welsh league pyramid, since 2019–20 the Football Association of Wales runs the second tier for the first time. Tier 2 is split into a north and central Wales league, Cymru North, and a corresponding league for south Wales, Cymru South. The champions of each of these leagues can be promoted to the Cymru Premier, subject to acceptable ground facilities, and if the champions cannot meet the criteria the runner-up team may be considered.

The Cymru North replaced the Cymru Alliance whilst the Cymru South incorporated most of the clubs of the then highest division of the Welsh Football League.

=== Tier 3: Ardal Leagues ===
Following a review of the Welsh league pyramid, since the 2020–21 season the Football Association of Wales has run the third tier. Tier 3, called the Ardal Leagues, is split into a Northern and Southern League, with each league further divided into two regionally based divisions, giving North East, North West, South East and South West leagues, each consisting of a maximum of 16 clubs. To avoid dividing the previous Mid-Wales teams across all four leagues, the North-East league contains a large contingent of the Mid-Wales teams. The North-West league contains the sides near the North Wales coast. To be eligible to join the league, clubs need to meet the criteria for FAW tier 3 certification.

The new structure replaces the former tier 3 leagues: Welsh Football League Division One, Mid Wales Football League Division One, Welsh Alliance League Division 1 and the Welsh National League Premier Division, which were based in South Wales, Mid Wales, North West Wales and North East Wales respectively.

Three clubs are relegated from each of the tier 3 leagues at the end of each season.

=== Tier 4: Area leagues ===
Below this are six local tier 4 leagues, each run by one of the area associations of Welsh football:

- Central Wales Football League (run by Central Wales Football Association)
- North East Wales Football League Premier Division (run by North East Wales Football Association)
- North Wales Coast East Football League Premier Division and North Wales Coast West Football League Premier Division (run by North Wales Coast Football Association)
- Gwent Premier League Premier Division (run by Gwent County Football Association)
- West Wales Premier League (run by the West Wales Football Association)
- South Wales Premier League Premier Division (run by South Wales Football Association)

The winners of each league are eligible for promotion to the Ardal Leagues subject to meeting FAW tier 3 certification. In the event that winners do not meet the criteria, the runner-up is also eligible for promotion, again subject to meeting the same tier 3 certification requirements.

=== Lower tier leagues ===
==== North Wales ====
Below the North Wales Coast East and West there are Division One leagues at tier 5 and North East Wales Football League has a championship division, also at tier 5.

==== Central Wales ====
In this area there are four leagues at tier 5: the Ceredigion League, the Montgomeryshire League, the Mid Wales South League, and the Aberystwyth League. These offer promotion to the tier 4 Central Wales Football League Northern and Southern divisions.

==== South Wales ====
Local leagues are affiliated to Gwent County FA, South Wales FA, and West Wales FA respectively, with promotion up the pyramid possible.

In the Gwent County FA Area, clubs from the Newport and District, East Gwent, Gwent Central and North Gwent leagues have a promotion pathway to Division Two of the Gwent County League (tier 6). Champions (or runners-up) of these leagues are eligible for promotion if they satisfy FAW criteria.

The South Wales Alliance League offers a promotion pathway to leagues affiliated to the South Wales Football Association. Champions of local leagues in the towns and cities of South Wales play off to be promoted into the South Wales Alliance Division Two (tier 6), subject to meeting licensing requirements.

The West Wales FA area has had its own Premier League since its creation in 2020, having previously having been the only FA area to not have one. Promotion to this tier 4 league is possible from the champions of the Pembrokeshire, Carmarthenshire, Swansea Senior and Neath & District Leagues, subject to meeting FAW licensing requirements. The top divisions of each of these leagues are at tier 5.

== Current system (until 2025–26) ==
From the 2023–24 season, the following structure will follow. For each division, its official name and number of clubs is given:

Level	Total clubs (802 +-)	League(s)/Division(s)																							
1	12	Cymru Premier; 12 clubs																							
2	32	Cymru North; 16 clubs						Cymru South; 16 clubs																	
3	64	Ardal Leagues North West 16 clubs			Ardal Leagues North East 16 clubs			Ardal Leagues; South West; 16 clubs									Ardal Leagues; South East; 16 clubs								
4	106	North East Wales Football League; Division One 12 clubs	North Wales Coast East League Premier Division; 13 clubs	North Wales Coast West League Premier Division; 15 clubs	Central Wales Football League North Division; 15 clubs	Central Wales Football League South Division; 8 clubs		West Wales Premier League; 16 clubs				South Wales Premier League Premier Division; 12 clubs									Gwent County League Premier Division; 16 clubs				
5	135	North East Wales Football League; Division Two; 8 clubs	North Wales Coast East League Division One; 9 clubs	North Wales Coast West League Division One; 12 clubs	Montgomeryshire League Division One; 14 clubs	Ceredigion League Division One; 12 clubs	Aberystwyth League Division One; 7 clubs	Pembrokeshire League Division One; 12 clubs	Carmarthenshire League Premier Division; 10 clubs	Swansea Senior League Premier Division; 11 clubs	Neath & District League Premier Division; 12 clubs	South Wales Premier League Championship; 13 clubs									Gwent County League Division One; 15 clubs				
6	100	North East Wales Football League; Division Two; 8 clubs				Ceredigion League Division Two; 10 clubs		Pembrokeshire League Division Two; 12 clubs	Carmarthenshire League Division One; 12 clubs	Swansea Senior League Division Two; 11 clubs	Neath & District League Division One; 11 clubs	South Wales Premier League Division One – West; 12 clubs				South Wales Premier League Division One – East; 12 clubs					Gwent County League Division Two; 11 clubs				
7	182					Ceredigion League Division Three; 7 clubs		Pembrokeshire League Division Three; 12 clubs	Carmarthenshire League Division Two; 13 clubs		Neath & District League Division Two; 11 clubs	Aberdare Valley League Premier Division; 12 clubs	Bridgend & District League Premier Division; 10 clubs	Cardiff & District League Premier Division; 9 clubs	Cardiff Combination League Premier Division; 8 clubs	Merthyr & District League Premier Division; 11 clubs	Port Talbot Football League Premier Division; 9 clubs	Rhondda & District League Premier Division; 8 clubs	Taff Ely & Rhymney Valley Alliance League Premier Division; 10 clubs	Vale of Glamorgan League Premier Division; 10 clubs	North Gwent League Premier Division; 12 clubs	Gwent Central League Division One; 10 clubs	Newport and District League Premier X Division; 9 clubs	Newport and District League Premier Y Division; 9 clubs	East Gwent League Division One; 8 clubs
8	111							Pembrokeshire League Division Four; 12 clubs			Neath & District League Division Three; 12 clubs		Bridgend & District League Division One; 11 clubs	Cardiff & District League Division One; 10 clubs	Cardiff Combination League Division One; 9 clubs			Rhondda & District League Division One; 8 clubs	Taff Ely & Rhymney Valley Alliance League Division One; 9 clubs	Vale of Glamorgan League Division One; 14 clubs		Gwent Central League Division Two; 9 clubs	Newport and District League Division One; 10 clubs		East Gwent League Division Two; 8 clubs
9	61							Pembrokeshire League Division Five; 12 clubs			Neath & District League Division Four; 11 clubs		Bridgend & District League Division Two; 11 clubs	Cardiff & District League Division Two; 10 clubs					Taff Ely & Rhymney Valley Alliance League Division Two; 9 clubs				Newport and District League Division Two; 10 clubs		
10	8													Cardiff & District League Division Three; 8 clubs											

== New system (From 2026–27 onwards) ==
From the 2026–27 season, the following structure will follow. For each division, its official name and number of clubs is given:

Level	Total clubs (822 +-)	League(s)/Division(s)																								
1	16	Cymru Premier; 16 clubs																								
2	32	Cymru North; 16 clubs							Cymru South; 16 clubs																	
3	64	Ardal Leagues North West 16 clubs			Ardal Leagues North East 16 clubs				Ardal Leagues; South West; 16 clubs									Ardal Leagues; South East; 16 clubs								
4	109	North East Wales Football League; Division One 11 clubs	North Wales Coast East League Premier Division; 13 clubs	North Wales Coast West League Premier Division; 15 clubs	Central Wales Football League North Division; 15 clubs	Central Wales Football League South Division; 12 clubs			West Wales Premier League; 16 clubs				South Wales Premier League Premier Division; 12 clubs									Gwent County League Premier Division; 16 clubs				
5	149	North East Wales Football League; Division Two 10 clubs	North Wales Coast East League Division One; 9 clubs	North Wales Coast West League Division One; 12 clubs	Montgomeryshire League Division One; 14 clubs	Ceredigion League Division One; 12 clubs	Aberystwyth League Division One; 7 clubs	Mid Wales South League Division One; 12 clubs	Pembrokeshire League Division One; 12 clubs	Carmarthenshire League Premier Division; 10 clubs	Swansea Senior League Premier Division; 11 clubs	Neath & District League Premier Division; 12 clubs	South Wales Premier League Championship; 13 clubs									Gwent County League Division One; 15 clubs				
6	102	North East Wales Football League; Division One 10 clubs				Ceredigion League Division Two; 10 clubs			Pembrokeshire League Division Two; 12 clubs	Carmarthenshire League Division One; 12 clubs	Swansea Senior League Division Two; 11 clubs	Neath & District League Division One; 12 clubs	South Wales Premier League Division One – West; 12 clubs				South Wales Premier League Division One – East; 12 clubs					Gwent County League Division Two; 11 clubs				
7	182					Ceredigion League Division Three; 7 clubs			Pembrokeshire League Division Three; 12 clubs	Carmarthenshire League Division Two; 13 clubs		Neath & District League Division Two; 12 clubs	Aberdare Valley League Premier Division; 12 clubs	Bridgend & District League Premier Division; 10 clubs	Cardiff & District League Premier Division; 9 clubs	Cardiff Combination League Premier Division; 8 clubs	Merthyr & District League Premier Division; 11 clubs	Port Talbot Football League Premier Division; 9 clubs	Rhondda & District League Premier Division; 8 clubs	Taff Ely & Rhymney Valley Alliance League Premier Division; 10 clubs	Vale of Glamorgan League Premier Division; 10 clubs	North Gwent League Premier Division; 12 clubs	Gwent Central League Division One; 10 clubs	Newport and District League Premier X Division; 9 clubs	Newport and District League Premier Y Division; 9 clubs	East Gwent League Division One; 8 clubs
8	111								Pembrokeshire League Division Four; 12 clubs			Neath & District League Division Three; 11 clubs		Bridgend & District League Division One; 11 clubs	Cardiff & District League Division One; 10 clubs	Cardiff Combination League Division One; 9 clubs			Rhondda & District League Division One; 8 clubs	Taff Ely & Rhymney Valley Alliance League Division One; 9 clubs	Vale of Glamorgan League Division One; 14 clubs		Gwent Central League Division Two; 9 clubs	Newport and District League Division One; 10 clubs		East Gwent League Division Two; 8 clubs
9	61								Pembrokeshire League Division Five; 12 clubs			Neath & District League Division Four; 9 clubs		Bridgend & District League Division Two; 11 clubs	Cardiff & District League Division Two; 10 clubs					Taff Ely & Rhymney Valley Alliance League Division Two; 9 clubs				Newport and District League Division Two; 10 clubs		
10	8														Cardiff & District League Division Three; 8 clubs											

== See also ==
- Football in Wales
- Welsh Cup
- Welsh League Cup
- FAW Premier Cup
- List of football clubs in Wales
- List of stadiums in Wales by capacity
