= Lliswerry A.F.C. =

Association football club in Wales

Coordinates: 51°34′26.2″N 2°57′19.5″W

Lliswerry
- Full name: Lliswerry; Association Football Club
- Founded: 1926 (reformed 1977)
- Ground: Spytty Park, Newport, Wales
- League: Ardal SE League
- 2024–25: Gwent County League Premier Division, 2nd of 16 (prmomoted)
Home colours	Away colours

Lliswerry Association Football Club is an association football club based in the Lliswerry area of the city of Newport, South Wales. They currently play in the Ardal SE League. They have in the past played in the Welsh Football League, the previous tier three league.

== History ==
The club was original formed in 1926, but after a break from senior football reformed in 1977, progressing through the divisions of the Newport and District Football League. In the early 1980s the club joined the Gwent County League with promotion to the Welsh Football League achieved in 2013.

The 2021–22 season saw the club go win the Gwent County Premier Division which entitled the club to promotion to the tier 3 Ardal Leagues pending the outcome of their tier three Certification application to the Football Association of Wales, which was awarded in May 2022.

== Honours ==
The club's honours include:

- Gwent County League Premier Division – Champions: 2021–22
- Gwent County League Division One – Champions: 2012–13
- Gwent County League Division Two – Champions: 1985–86
- Monmouthshire/ Gwent Amateur Cup – Winners: 1931–32, 2011–12, 2012–13
- Gwent County Challenge Cup – Winners: 1990–91, 1993–94
- Newport and District Football League Senior Bowl – Winners: 1977–78
- Newport and District Football League Premier 'X' – Champions: 1978–79, 1983–84
- Newport and District Football League Premier 'Y' – Champions: 1985–86, 2003–04
- Newport and District Football League First Division – Champions: 2009–10
- Newport and District Football League Division 2A – Champions: 1978–79, 1990–91
