= 2021–22 Welsh Cup =

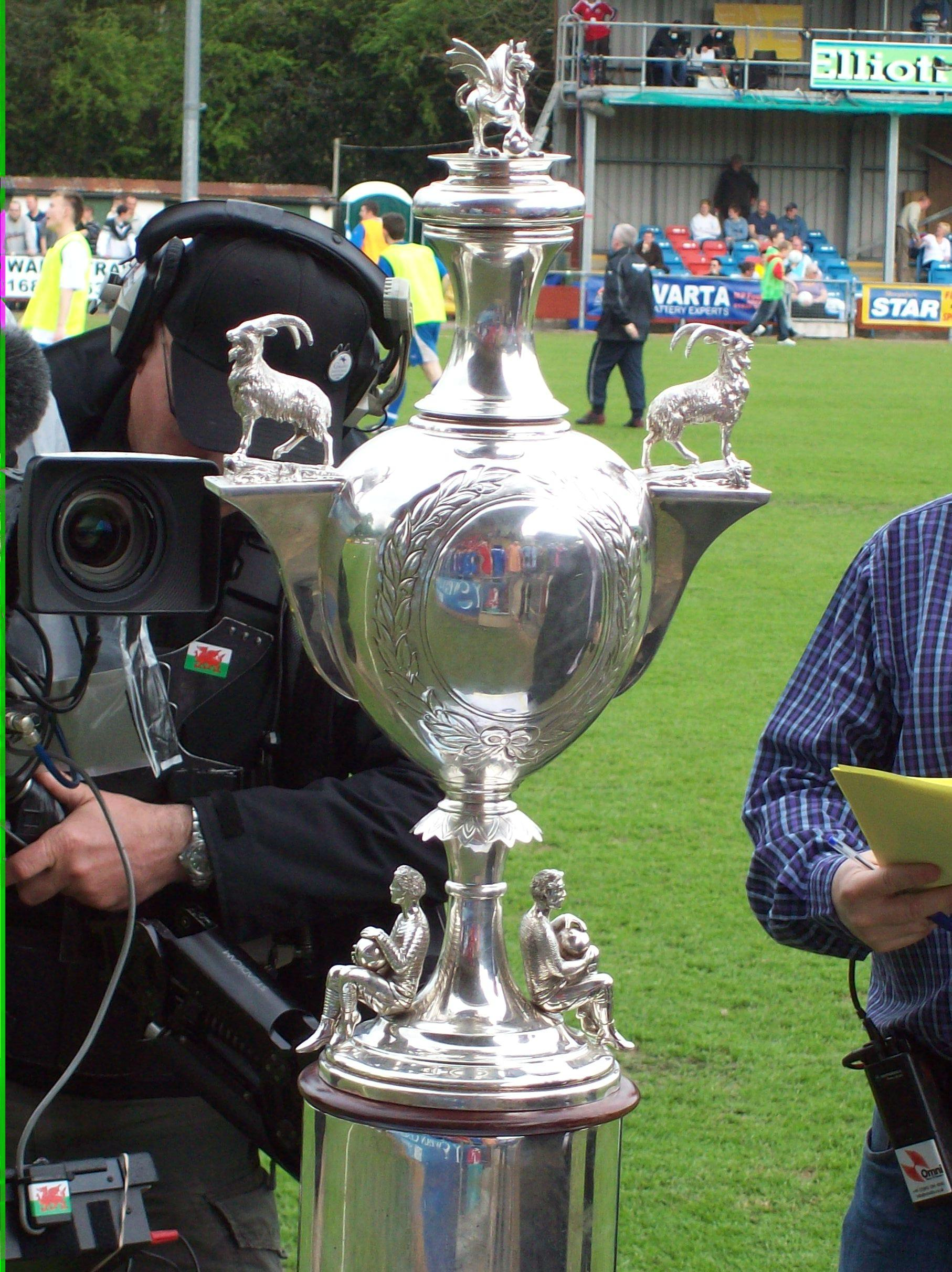
- The Welsh Cup

Tournament details
- Country: Wales
- Dates: 9 July 2021 – 1 May 2022

Final positions
- Champions: The New Saints
- Runners-up: Penybont

The 2021–22 FAW Welsh Cup was the 134th season of the annual knockout tournament for competitive football teams in Wales. The New Saints were the competition's winners, the eighth time they had triumphed.

== Changes to the competition ==
Ahead of the first matches of the cup, the Football Association of Wales announced that for the 2021–22 season there would the following changes:

- There will no longer be any extra-time with matches ending in a tie going straight to a penalty shoot-out;
- An extended Round of 64 will be been introduced, meaning that Round 2 will see all twelve Cymru Premier clubs directly enter the competition alongside half of the Tier 2 clubs who did not enter in the Round 1 stage;
- Introduction of a seeding system for Round 2 to encourage more encounters between larger and smaller clubs;
- Changes to prize money awarded which will award money to all clubs winning matches from the start of the tournament including qualifying rounds;
- Introduction of a coefficient ranking system to assist with byes and seeding in future editions of the cup.

== First qualifying round ==
The first qualifying round matches were announced on 11 June and played on 9 and 10 July.

=== North ===
Team 1	Score	Team 2
Match date
9 July
Y Rhyl 1879 (4)	10–0	Rhyl Dragons (5)
Llysfaen (5)	2–1	CPD Gwalchmai (4)
10 July
Amlwch Town (4)	4–0	CPD Pentraeth (4)
Bangor 1876 (4)	8–2	Menai Bridge Tigers (4)
Bethel United	w/o	CPD Waunfawr (5)
Blaenau Ffestiniog (3)	0–3	Meliden (4)
Bodorgan Juniors (5)	0–11	Bodedern Athletic (4)
Caerwys (5)	3–5	Llanelwy Athletic (5)
Castell Alun (4)	1–2	Brickfield Rangers
Coedpoeth United (4)	1–4	FC Queens Park (4)
CPD Cefni (5)	2–4	Caergybi (5)
CPD Henllan (5)	0–3	CPD Bro Cernyw (4)
CPD Llanberis (4)	4–2	Llanrug United (4)
CPD Llanerch-Y-Medd (5)	2–2; 3–0 (p)	CPD Aberffraw (4)
CPD Llannefydd (4)	2–3	Llansannan (4)
CPD Y Fali (5)	w/o	CPD Bro Goronwy (–)
Gaerwen (4)	1–4	Glantraeth (5)
Greenfield (4)	1–4	Rhydymwyn (3)
Halkyn & Flint Mountain (4)	1–1; 2–4 (p)	Connahs Quay Town (5)
Hawarden Rangers (4)	4–2	Mynydd Isa Spartans (4)
Llanfairfechan Town (4)	3–1	Llandudno Junction (4)
Mountain Rangers (5)	1–3 (Note: Following these games, four winning clubs were found guilty of breaking Welsh Cup rules and as such the opposition instead progressed to the next round of the competition."Decisions of National Cup Board: FAW Qualifying Round 1". Football Association of Wales. 17 July 2021.)	Nefyn United (4)
New Brighton Villa (4)	1–3	Chirk AAA (3)
Penmaenmawr Phoenix (4)	3–5	Llandyrnog United (4)
Penrhyndeudraeth (4)	3–1	Talysarn Celts (5)
Penycae (3)	4–2	Lex XI (4)
Prestatyn Sports (4)	3–1	NFA (5)
Pwllheli (4)	2–2; 7–6 (p)	Llanystumdwy (5)
Rhos Aelwyd (3)	2–0	Cefn Mawr Rangers (4)
Ruabon Rangers (5)	2–7	Saltney Town (3)
St Asaph City (3)	2–2; 1–3 (p)	Rhuddlan Town (4)
Treaddur Bay Bulls (–)	w/o	Llangoed (5)
Y Felinheli (3)	4–0	Mynydd Llandegai (4)

=== Central ===
Team 1	Score	Team 2
Match date
10 July
Aberaeron (4)	6–2	Borth United (5)
Abermule (4)	w/o	Four Crosses (3)
Brecon Corries (4)	6–0	Carno (3)
Dolgellau (3)	2–1	Machynlleth (3)
Hay St Marys (4)	0–0; 3–4 (p)	Knighton Town (4)
Llansantffraid Village (4)	2–1	Waterloo Rovers (4)
Montgomery Town (4)	0–3	Llanymynech (5)
Radnor Valley (4)	w/o	Presteigne St Andrews (5)
Rhayader Town (3)	1–2	Builth Wells (4)
Tregaron Turfs (4)	0–6	Penparcau (3)
Tywyn Bryncrug (4)	1–1; 3–2 (p)	Barmouth & Dyffryn United (4)

=== South ===
Team 1	Score	Team 2
Match date
9 July
Blaenrhondda (4)	0–4	Ynyshir Albions (3)
Cardiff Airport (5)	3–2	Cardiff Draconians (3)
Cardiff Corinthians (4)	0–3	Canton Liberal (4)
Croesyceilog (3)	0–3	Abertillery Bluebirds (3)
10 July
Aber Valley (4)	2–1	Tredegar Town (3)
Aberdare Town (4)	1–1; 2–4 (p)	Cwmbach Royal Stars (6)
Aberfan (6)	4–3	Vale United (5)
Abergavenny Town (3)	2–1	New Inn (5)
AC Pontymister (4)	3–0	Pill YMCA (4)
AFC Pemrhiwceiber (5)	1–2	Pemrhiwceiber Rangers (3)
AFC Porth (3)	1–2	Maesteg Park (5)
Bryn Rovers (5)	w/o	Ystradgynlais (4)
Canton Rangers (5)	5–5; 4–1 (p)	Aberystwyth Exiles (7)
Cefn Hengoed	1–2	Aberbargoed Buds (3)
Clwb Cymric (5)	1–0	Bridgend Street (4)
Cwm Wanderers (4)	0–2	Seven Sisters Onllwyn (4)
Cwmbrân Town (5)	0–3	Monmouth Town (3)
Dafen Welfare (4)	0–3	Newcastle Emlyn (4)
Docks Albion (7)	0–2	AFC Whitchurch (5)
Fairwater (7)	6–4	Ely Rangers (5)
FC Tredegar (5)	2–0	Machen (5)
FC Porthcawl (7)	0–3 (Note: These ties were reversed from the original announced home venues.)	Baglan Dragons (4)
Garw SBGC (4)	4–1	Ton & Gelli BGC (5)
Gorseinon Athletic (5)	5–6	Morriston Town (4)
Merthyr Saints (4)	3–0	AFC Llwydcoed (3)
Mumbles Rangers (4)	1–2	Penlan Club (4)
Newport City (3)	2–0	Caerleon (4)
Newport Civil Service (4)	2–5	Newport Corinthians (4)
Pentwynmawr Athletic (5)	1–8	Abertillery Excelsiors (3)
Pontyclun (3)	2–1	Cefn Cribwr (4)
Porthcawl Town Athletic (4)	w/o	CRC Olympic (5)
Roath Park Rangers	w/o	Dinas Powys (3)
South Gower (4)	4–0	Pontarddulais Town (5)
St Albans (6)	0–2	Chepstow Town (3)
Ton Pentre (3)	w/o	Pencoed Athletic (4)
Treharris Athletic (3)	1–2	FC Cwmaman (4)
Treowen Stars (3)	1–0	Panteg (3)
Trethomas Bluebirds (3)	3–2	Caerphilly Athletic (5)
Trostre (5)	6–1	Evans & Williams (4)
Wattsville (4)	6–3	Rogerstone (4)
West End (3)	3–3; 7–6 (p)	Rockspur Fords (5)
Ynysddu Welfare (4)	2–4	Treforest (5)
Ynysygerwn (3)	3–0	Giants Grave (4)

== Second qualifying round ==
The draw for the second qualifying round was made on 12 July 2021 and the matches were played on 23 and 24 July.

=== North ===
Team 1	Score	Team 2
Match date
23 July
Chirk AAA (3)	2–2; 3–4 (p)	Rhos Aelwyd (3)
Llandudno Albion (3)	4–1	Glantraeth (5)
Llysfaen (5)	0–4	Llanelwy Athletic (5)
24 July
Amlwch Town (4)	1–2	Llanrwst United (3)
Brickfield Rangers (3)	0–3	Saltney Town (3)
Bro Cernyw (4)	1–5	Llanfairfechan Town (4)
Caergybi (5)	5–0	Llangoed (5)
CPD Llanberis (4)	2–2; 4–2 (p)	Nantlle Vale (3)
CPD Llanerch Y Medd (5)	w/o (Note: This match did not take place as the Bangor 1876 squad had to self-isolate given a positive Covid-19 case. The club released a statement to say that they were appealing against an FAW decision that the match would be forfeited."Welsh Cup: Club Statement". Bangor 1876. 26 July 2021.) (Note: Bangor 1876's appeal was unsuccessful."Statement on Welsh Cup expulsion". Bangor 1876.)	Bangor 1876 (4)
CPD Y Fali (5)	1–6	Bodedern Athletic (4)
Y Rhyl 1879 (4)	2–0	Prestatyn Sports (4)
Denbigh Town (3)	12–2 (Note: Played at Cambian Pengwern College.)	Rhudddlan Town
FC Queens Park (4)	1–4	Cefn Albion (3)
Hawarden Rangers (4)	0–4 (Note: These ties were reversed from the original announced home venues.)	Llay Welfare (3)
Llandyrnog United (4)	4–1	CPD Llansannan (4)
Llanuwchllyn (3)	1–0	Pwllheli (4)
Meliden (4)	2–3	Rhydymwyn (3)
Mold Alexandra (3)	3–0	Connahs Quay Town (5)
Penrhyndeudraeth (4)	3–0	Dolgellau (4)
Penycae (3)	1–1; 2–4 (p)	Brymbo (3)
Porthmadog (3)	9–0	CPD Mountain Rangers
Rhostyllen (3)	5–0	Corwen (3)
Y Felinheli (3)	2–0	CPD Waunfawr (5)

=== Central ===
Team 1	Score	Team 2
Match date
24 July
Aberaeron (4)	3–1	Builth Wells (4)
Berriew (3)	w/o	Knighton Town (4)
Brecon Corries (4)	3–0	Llandrindod Wells (3)
Four Crosses (3)	0–3	Llanfair United (3)
Llanymynech (5)	0–6	Caersws (3)
Llansantffraid Village (4)	2–2; 4–2 (p)	Welshpool Town (3)
Presteigne St Andrews (5)	1–4	Bow Street (3)
Tywyn Bryncrug (4)	0–4	Penparcau (3)

=== South ===
Team 1	Score	Team 2
Match date
23 July
Canton Liberal (4)	1–1; 0–3 (p)	Dinas Powys (3)
Merthyr Saints (4)	0–3	Penydarren BGC (3)
Ynyshir Albions (3)	2–0	Cwmbach Royal Stars (6)
24 July
Aberbargoed Buds (3)	1–4	AC Pontymister (4)
Aberfan (6)	0–6	Pemrhiwceiber Rangers (3)
Abertillery Bluebirds (3)	2–2; 6–7 (p)	Caldicot Town (3)
Abertillery Excelsiors (3)	1–3	Monmouth Town (3)
Bryn Rovers (5)	2–7	Pencoed Athletic (4)
Caerau Ely (3)	3–1	Canton Rangers (5)
Cardiff Airport (5)	4–0	Ynysddu Welfare (4)
Chepstow Town (3)	1–0	Rogerstone (4)
Clwb Cymric (5)	3–4	Fairwater (7)
Cwmamman United (3)	2–1	South Gower (4)
FC Tredegar (5)	0–5	Trethomas Bluebirds (3)
Garden Village (3)	6–2	Newcastle Emlyn (4)
Garw SBGC (4)	2–8	Ynysygerwn (3)
Goytre (3)	1–1; 5–3 (p)	Newport City (3)
Morriston Town (4)	0–6	Pontardawe Town (3)
Newport Corinthians (4)	0–1	Abergavenny Town (3)
Pontyclun (3)	4–0	AFC Whitchurch (5)
Porthcawl Town Athletic (4)	3–1 (Note: These ties were reversed from the original announced home venues.)	Maesteg Park (5)
Treharris Athletic (3)	3–2	Baglan Dragons (4)
Treowen Stars (3)	1–2	Aber Valley (4)
Trostre (5)	1–4	Penlan Club (4)
West End (3)	4–2	Seven Sisters Onllwyn (4)

== First round ==
The draw for the first round, which took place on 26 July, saw 8 clubs from the Cymru North and 8 from the Cymru South join the competition. Matches took place on 13, 14 and 15 August.

=== Northern ===
Team 1	Score	Team 2
Match date
13 August
Llandudno Albion (3)	5–1	CPD Llanerch-Y-Medd (5)
14 August
Bodedern Athletic (4)	5–1	Llandyrnog United (4)
Bow Street (3)	2–3	Llanidloes Town (2)
Brymbo (3)	3–1	Llansantffraid Village (4)
Buckley Town (2)	2–1	Mold Alexandra (3)
Y Rhyl 1879 (4)	1–0	Rhydymwyn (3)
Caergybi (5)	1–4	Cefn Albion (3)
Caersws (3)	2–2; 4–5 (p)	Rhostyllen (3)
Holyhead Hotspur (2)	1–0	Rhos Aelwyd (3)
Holywell Town (2)	2–3	Gresford Athletic (2)
Llanelwy Athletic (5)	2–7	Berriew (3)
Llanfair United (3)	2–3	Penrhyndeudraeth (4)
Llanfairfechan Town (4)	1–2	Llanrwst United (3)
Llangefni Town (2)	0–1	Ruthin Town (2)
Llanuwchllyn (3)	2–4	Denbigh Town (3)
Llay Welfare (3)	2–4 (Note: These ties were reversed from the original announced home venues.)	Llandudno (2)
Porthmadog (3)	3–0	CPD Llanberis (4)
Saltney Town (3)	3–1	Y Felinheli (3)

=== Southern ===
Team 1	Score	Team 2
Match date
13 August
Caldicot Town (3)	6–3	Penparcau (3)
Penydarren BGC (3)	1–0 (Note: Played at Penydarren Park, ground of Merthyr Town.)	Cwmbran Celtic (2)
Undy Athletic (2)	3–0	Chepstow Town (3)
14 August
AC Pontymister (4)	1–2	Dinas Powys (3)
Aberaeron (4)	1–3	Ynyshir Albions (3)
Abergavenny Town (3)	1–3	Taff's Well (2)
Caerau Ely (3)	3–8	Brecon Corries (4)
Cardiff Airport (5)	2–2; 1–3 (p)	Trethomas Bluebirds (3)
Cwmamman United (3)	1–3 (Note: These ties were reversed from the original announced home venues.)	Monmouth Town (3)
Garden Village (3)	2–2; 0–3 (p)	Goytre (3)
Llantwit Major (2)	4–0	Risca United (2)
Pencoed Athletic (4)	5–0	Treharris Athletic (3)
Penlan Club (4)	0–2	Ynysygerwn (3)
Pontyclun (3)	0–3	Pontardawe Town (3)
Port Talbot Town (2)	0–6	Afan Lido (2)
Porthcawl Town Athletic (4)	0–2	Aber Valley (4)
Trefelin BGC (2)	8–1	Fairwater (7)
West End (3)	2–12	Pemrhiwceiber Rangers (3)

== Second round ==
The second round of the competition saw the remaining eight clubs from each of the Cymru North and Cymru South, as well as all 12 Cymru Premier clubs join the competition. The draw took place on 16 August with ties played on 3 and 4 September 2021.

Six clubs from tier four remained at the start of this round of the competition as the lowest ranked clubs, but all were eliminated by clubs from higher divisions. Bala Town's 17–1 victory over Brymbo equalled the record for the biggest margin of victory in a Welsh Cup tie.

=== Northern ===
Team 1	Score	Team 2
Match date
3 September
Llandudno (2)	1–2	Airbus UK Broughton (2)
Connah's Quay Nomads (1)	5–0	Y Rhyl 1879 (4)
Denbigh Town (3)	0–4	Caernarfon Town (1)
Gresford Athletic (2)	1–2	Colwyn Bay (2)
4 September
Bala Town (1)	17–1	Brymbo (3)
Bodedern Athletic (4)	4–5	Ruthin Town (2)
Buckley Town (2)	3–1	Porthmadog (3)
Cefn Druids (1)	0–0; 4–2 (p)	Holyhead Hotspur (2)
Conwy Borough (2)	3–2	Cefn Albion (3)
Flint Town United (1)	5–0	Penrhyndeudraeth (4)
Llandudno Albion (3)	3–5	Guilsfield (2)
Llanidloes Town (2)	1–4	Bangor City (2)
Llanrhaeadr (2)	3–5	Saltney Town (3)
Newtown (1)	6–1	Berriew (3)
Prestatyn Town (2)	6–0	Rhostyllen (3)
The New Saints (1)	6–0	Llanrwst United (3)

=== Southern ===
Team 1	Score	Team 2
Match date
3 September
Ammanford (2)	0–3	Penrhiwceiber Rangers (3)
Briton Ferry Llansawel (2)	0–3	Trefelin BGC (2)
4 September
Aberystwyth Town (1)	9–0	Aber Valley (4)
Barry Town United (1)	2–0	Goytre (3)
Carmarthen Town (2)	2–1	Trethomas Bluebirds (3)
Dinas Powys (3)	2–1	Afan Lido (2)
Goytre United (2)	0–3	Taff's Well (2)
Haverfordwest County (1)	6–0	Brecon Corries (4)
Monmouth Town (3)	3–0	Llanelli Town (2)
Llantwit Major (2)	3–0 (Note: These ties were reversed from the original announced home venues.)	Pencoed Athletic (4)
Penrhyncoch (2)	4–1	Ynyshir Albions (3)
Penybont (1)	7–0	Undy Athletic (2)
Pontardawe Town (3)	0–1	Cardiff Metropolitan University (1)
Pontypridd Town (2)	6–0	Penydarren BGC (3)
Swansea University (2)	6–3	Caldicot Town (3)
Ynysygerwn (3)	1–3	Cambrian & Clydach Vale BGC (2)

== Third round ==
The draw took place on 6 September with ties played on 24 and 25 September 2021. Four clubs from tier three progressed from round two as the lowest ranked remaining clubs, with three of them gaining home ties.

Team 1	Score	Team 2
Match date
24 September
Caernarfon Town (1)	3–0	Prestatyn Town (2)
Cambrian & Clydach Vale BGC (2)	1–3	Penybont (1)
Colwyn Bay (2)	5–1	Ruthin Town (2)
Conwy Borough (2)	0–1	The New Saints (1)
Taff's Well (2)	2–1	Llantwit Major (2)
25 September
Aberystwyth Town (1)	4–1	Cefn Druids (1)
Airbus UK Broughton (2)	1–2	Haverfordwest County (1)
Bala Town (1)	5–0	Pontypridd Town (2)
Buckley Town (2)	2–0	Monmouth Town (3)
Cardiff Metropolitan University (1)	3–0	Barry Town United (1)
Dinas Powys (3)	2–4	Guilsfield (2)
Newtown (1)	0–0; 4–5 (p)	Carmarthen Town (2)
Pemrhiwceiber Rangers (3)	1–3	Flint Town United (1)
Saltney Town (3)	0–0; 4–2 (p)	Penrhyncoch (2)
Swansea University (2)	1–0	Bangor City (2)
Trefelin BGC (2)	0–4	Connah's Quay Nomads (1)

== Fourth round ==
The draw took place on 27 September. Saltney Town, the only remaining club from the Ardal Leagues (tier 3), were drawn at home to Cymru Premier side Aberystwyth Town. Ties were played on 15 and 16 October 2021. The upset of the round was Colwyn Bay's defeat of higher league Cardiff Metropolitan University.

Team 1	Score	Team 2
Match date
15 October
Flint Town United (1)	0–2	Connah's Quay Nomads (1)
16 October
Buckley Town (2)	0–2	Taff's Well (2)
Carmarthen Town (2)	0–0; 4–5 (p)	The New Saints (1)
Colwyn Bay (2)	1–0	Cardiff Metropolitan University (1)
Haverfordwest County (1)	1–3	Bala Town (1)
Penybont (1)	0–0; 3–1 (p)	Caernarfon Town (1)
Saltney Town (3)	0–0; 4–5 (p)	Aberystwyth Town (1)
Swansea University (2)	1–2	Guilsfield (2)

== Quarter-finals ==
The quarter-final draw took place on 18 October with matches played on 19 February 2022. Colwyn Bay was the only non-Cymru Premier side to advance after beating Cymru Premier champions Connah's Quay Nomads 2–0 away.

19 February 2022	Bala Town (1)	2–1	Aberystwyth Town (1)	Bala
14:30	Dean Ebbe 9', 63'		Harry Franklin 86'	Stadium: Maes Tegid; Attendance: 260; Referee: Robert Jenkins

19 February 2022	Connah's Quay Nomads (1)	0–2	Colwyn Bay (2)	Connah's Quay
14:30			Ryan Edwards 63'; James Kirby 66'	Stadium: Deeside Stadium; Attendance: 604; Referee: Iwan Griffith

19 February 2022	Penybont (1)	3–2	Taff's Well (2)	Bridgend
12:45	Lewis Clutton 2'; Sam Snaith 88'; Daniel Jefferies 89'		David Lyon 45+1'; Jan Maertens 52'	Stadium: Bryntirion Park; Referee: Bryn Markham-Jones

19 February 2022	The New Saints (1)	2–0	Guilsfield (2)	Oswestry
14:30	Jon Routledge 45+3'; Ben Clark 78'			Stadium: Park Hall; Attendance: 327; Referee: Cheryl Foster

== Semi-finals ==
The draw took place on 21 February. Semi-final ties will be played at neutral venues on 18 and 20 March 2022. The match dates and venues were announced on 4 March. The first semi saw Penybont reach their first Welsh Cup final, beating Bala Town on penalties whilst the second saw the recently confirmed Cymru Premier champions The New Saints beat Colwyn Bay 1–0.

18 March 2022	Penybont (1)	0–0 (5—3 p)	Bala Town (1)	Aberystwyth
19:45				Stadium: Park Avenue; Attendance: 215; Referee: Thomas Owen
	Penalties
	Mael Davies (penalty scored); Sam Snaith (penalty scored); Nathan Wood (penalty scored); Kane Owen (penalty scored); Shaun MacDonald (penalty scored)		Chris Venables (penalty scored); Dave Edwards (penalty scored); Bradley Bauress (penalty missed); Antony Kay (penalty scored)

20 March 2022	The New Saints (1)	1–0	Colwyn Bay (2)	Rhyl
14:15	Danny Davies 15'			Stadium: Belle Vue; Attendance: 1013; Referee: Dean John

== Final ==
The final was played on 1 May 2022 at the Cardiff City Stadium. The New Saints won the competition for the eighth time, going three goals up with two scored by Jordan Williams before Penybont scored two goals in the final five minutes of the match.

1 May 2022	Penybont (1)	2–3	The New Saints (1)	Cardiff
16:00	Shaun MacDonald 85'; Daniel Jefferies 90+1'	Report	Jordan Williams 31', 32'; Declan McManus 59' (p)	Stadium: Cardiff City Stadium; Attendance: 2,417; Referee: Robert Jenkins
