= 2017–18 Welsh Cup =

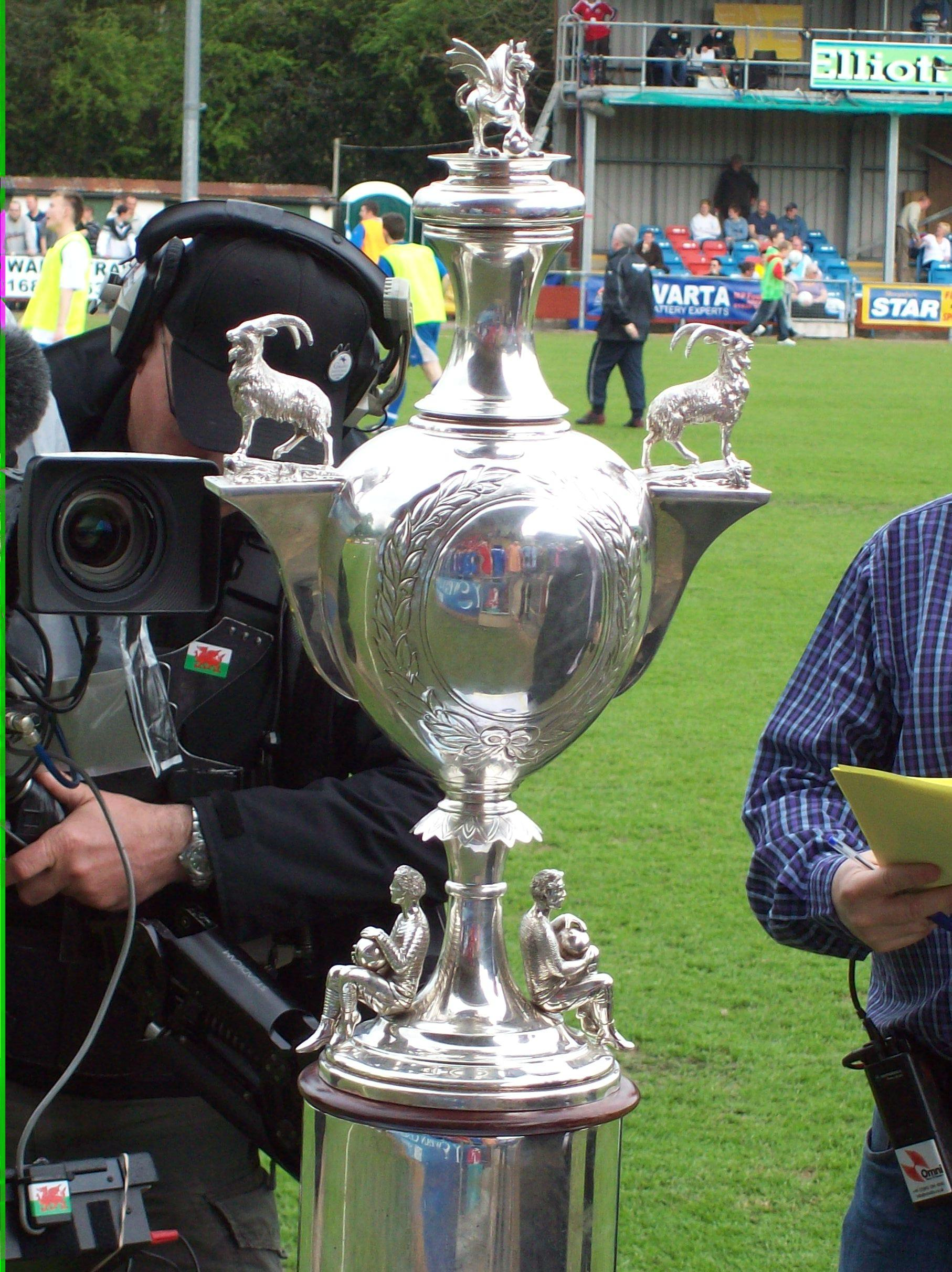
- The Welsh Cup

Tournament details
- Country: Wales

Final positions
- Champions: Connah's Quay Nomads
- Runners-up: Aberystwyth Town

The 2017–18 FAW Welsh Cup was the 131st season of the annual knockout tournament for competitive football teams in Wales.

The winners Connah's Quay Nomads qualified for the 2018–19 UEFA Europa League preliminary round.

== First qualifying round ==
The draw for the first qualifying round was held on 12 July 2017. The draw was regionalized into six sections: South East, South Central, South West, Central, North West and North East. All matches were played on 19 August 2017.

South East region

Team 1	Score	Team 2
Villa Dino Christchurch (5)	4–1	Neuadd Wen (4)
Abertillery Bluebirds (5)	5–4	Chepstow Town (4)
Panteg (4)	2–0	Newport City (4)
Newport YMCA (5)	1–4	Machen (6)
FC Tredegar (6)	3–3 (a.e.t.) (6–7) p	Tredegar Town (4)
Cwmbrân Town (5)	3–1	Caerleon (5)

South Central region

The Aber Valley/Cardiff Corinthians and Merthyr Saints/Tiger Bay ties had been reversed.

Team 1	Score	Team 2
Butetown (6)	3–2	Aberfan S.D.C. (6)
Cardiff Draconians (5)	8–1	Canton Liberal F.C. (5)
Llantwit Fardre (6)	1–0	Grange Allstars F.C. (8)
Merthyr Saints (5)	6–4	Tiger Bay
Treharris Athletic Western (4)	7–0	Llanrumney United (7)
Blaenrhondda (7)	3–4	Brecon Corries (5)
Trethomas Bluebirds (4)	3–4	Ely Rangers (4)
Aber Valley (5)	3–4	Cardiff Corinthians (5)
Penydarren (5)	5–3	Penrhiwceiber Rangers (4)
Trebanog (6)	0–2	Caerphilly Athletic (5)
Treforest (6)	1–3 (a.e.t.)	Brecon Northcote (4)
Rumney Juniors (8)	4–2	Ferndale BGC
Pontlottyn (5)	2–6	Bridgend Street (4)
Pontyclun (4)	2–0	Garw (6)
Clwb Cymric (6)	0–1	Penrhiwfer (7)

South West region

Team 1	Score	Team 2
Penlan Club (5)	1–4	Caerau (4)
Llangynwyd Rangers (5)	2–3	Porthcawl Town (6)
Trefelin (4)	1–1 (a.e.t.); 1–3 p	Ynysygerwn (4)
Newcastle Emlyn (5)	0–2	Pencoed Athletic (5)
Carmarthen Stars (5)	4–3	CRC Rangers (5)
Swansea University (4)	2–2 (a.e.t.); 1–4 p	Cefn Cribwr Boys Club (6)

Central region

Team 1	Score	Team 2
Kerry (4)	2–1	Hay St Marys (4)
Abermule (4)	1–0	Tywyn Bryncrug (3)
Llansantffraid Village (4)	6–0	Montgomery Town (4)
Borth United (3)	5–3	Trewern United (5)
Churchstoke (3)	2–3 (a.e.t.)	Welshpool Town (3)
Machynlleth (3)	0–5	Llandrindod Wells (3)

North East region

Team 1	Score	Team 2
Lex Glyndwr (3)	2–1	Greenfield (3)
Penyffordd Lions (5)	3–2	Cefn Albion (3)
Rhydymwyn (4)	3–2	Cefn Mawr Rangers (4)
Rhostyllen (3)	4–2	Llangollen Town (4)
Brymbo Victoria (4)	3–6 (a.e.t.)	Acton (5)
Penycae (3)	5–3	Castell Alun Colts (4)
St Asaph City (3)	1–2	Llay Welfare (3)
FC Penley (4)	4–4 (a.e.t.); 4–3 p	Mostyn Dragons (5)
Rhos Aelwyd (4)	1–2	Coedpoeth United (3)
New Brighton Villa (4)	0–2	Brymbo (4)
Mynydd Isa Spartans (4)	1–3	Rhosllanerchrugog (5)

North West region

Team 1	Score	Team 2
Barmouth & Dyffryn United (3)	1–0	Llanfairpwll (4)
Cemaes Bay (3)	0–5	Llannefydd (4)
Llanberis (3)	2–3	Llandudno Albion (3)
Waunfawr (5)	4–6 (a.e.t.)	Llanrwst United (3)
Nantlle Vale (3)	5–1	Llanystumdwy (5)
Blaenau Ffestiniog Amateurs (4)	3–12	Llandyrnog United (3)
Trearddur Bay United (3)	1–3	Aberffraw (4)
Pwllheli (3)	3–1 (a.e.t)	Llangefni Town (3)
Penrhyndeudraeth (3)	2–3	Bodedern Athletic (4)
Llanrug United (3)	4–2 (a.e.t)	Pentraeth (4)
Holyhead Town	2–4	Gaerwen (4)

== Second qualifying round ==
The draw for the second qualifying round was held on 21 August 2017. The draw was regionalized into five sections: South East, South West, Central, North West and North East. Matches were played on 9 September 2017 with the exception of Mynydd Llandygai/Mochdre Sports which was played on 23 September 2017 . Treharris Athletic Western were disqualified for fielding an ineligible player and Llanrumney United replaced them.

South East region

Team 1	Score	Team 2
Bridgend Street (4)	7–0	Llanrumney United (7)
Rumney Juniors (8)	1–4	Caerphilly Athletic (5)
Butetown (6)	3–5	STM Sports (3)
Machen (6)	4–0	Ely Rangers (4)
Abertillery Bluebirds (5)	1–2	Cardiff Corinthians (5)
Llwydcoed (3)	3–4 (a.e.t.)	Panteg (4)
Risca United (3)	1–2 (a.e.t.)	Croesyceiliog (3)
Cwmbrân Town (5)	1–7	Aberbargoed Buds (3)
Abergavenny Town (3)	7–0	Porth (3)
Villa Dino Christchurch (5)	2–5	Caldicot Town (3)
Cardiff Draconians (5)	5–1	Tredegar Town (4)
Aberdare Town (3)	2–1	Dinas Powys (3)

South West region

Team 1	Score	Team 2
West End (3)	1–1 (a.e.t.); 1–3 p	Ynysygerwn (4)
Caerau (4)	2–6	Pontyclun (4)
Penrhiwfer (7)	1–3 (a.e.t.)	Pontypridd Town (3)
Pontardawe Town (3)	3–4 (a.e.t.)	Garden Village (3)
Brecon Corries (5)	1–3	Penydarren (5)
Carmarthen Stars (5)	5–4 (a.e.t.)	Porthcawl Town (6)
Llantwit Major (3)	2–1	Cefn Cribwr Boys Club (6)
Ammanford (3)	5–2	Merthyr Saints (5)
Pencoed Athletic (5)	2–0	Llantwit Fardre (6)

Central region

Team 1	Score	Team 2
Knighton Town (3)	0–2	Bow Street (3)
Llansantffraid Village (4)	0–7	Berriew (3)
Llanrhaeadr (3)	3–1	Kerry (4)
Welshpool Town (3)	3–4	Aberaeron (3)
Abermule (4)	3–2	Borth United (3)
Carno (3)	2–1	Llandrindod Wells (3)
Rhayader Town (3)	3–2 (a.e.t.)	Brecon Northcote (4)
Llanidloes Town (3)	3–0	Barmouth & Dyffryn United (3))

North East region

The Mold Alexandra/Acton, Penycae/Llay Welfare and Llanuwchllyn/Chirk ties were reversed from the original draw.

Team 1	Score	Team 2
Rhosllanerchrugog (5)	2–3	Penyffordd Lions (5)
Lex Glyndwr (3)	1–0	Hawarden Rangers (3)
FC Penley (4)	3–2	Brymbo (4)
Saltney Town (3)	3–2	Coedpoeth United (3
Penycae (3)	1–3	Llay Welfare (3)
Rhostyllen (3)	2–7	Brickfield Rangers (3)
Mold Alexandra (3)	5–0	Acton (5)
Corwen (3)	3–1 (a.e.t.)	Nomads of Connahs Quay (3)
Llanuwchllyn (3)	0–1	Chirk AAA (3)
Rhydymwyn (4)	0–2	Buckley Town (3)

North West region

Glantraeth FC were due to play Prestatyn Sports but withdrew.

Team 1	Score	Team 2
Meliden (4)	3–3 (a.e.t.); 4–3 (p)	Nantlle Vale (3)
Gaerwen (4)	6–5	Pwllheli (3)
Llanrug United (3)	5–1	Llandyrnog United (3)
Penmaenmawr Phoenix (4)	1–4	Llanrwst United (3)
Bodedern Athletic (4)	2–0	Aberffraw (4)
Llandudno Albion (3)	1–1 (a.e.t.); 5–4 (p)	Llannefydd (4)
Conwy Borough (3)	4–1	Amlwch Town (4)
Mynydd Llandygai (3)	0–3	Mochdre Sports (4)

== First round ==
The draw for the first round was held on 11 September 2017.

Results:

Team 1	Score	Team 2
6 October
Aberdare Town (3)	0–0(a.e.t.) (2–3 p)	Ammanford (3)
7 October
Caersws (2)	w/o	(4)
Conwy Borough (3)	5-1	Bodedern Athletic (4)
Aberbargoed Buds (3)	2-0	Port Talbot Town (2)
STM Sports (3)	5-2	Afan Lido (2)
Caldicot Town (3)	2-3	Goytre (2)
Porthmadog (2)	3-0	Penyffordd (5)
Garden Village (3)	3-4	Penrhyncoch (2)
Brickfield Rangers (3)	1-0	Chirk AAA (3)
Mochdre Sports (4)	1–1(a.e.t.) (3–5 p)	F.C. Penley (4)
Pontypridd Town (3)	2–1(a.e.t.)	Cambrian & Clydach Vale (2)
Llay Welfare (3)	1-0	Llanrug United (3)
Buckley Town (3)	2-1	Llanidloes Town (3)
Gaerwen (4)	1-3	Llandudno Junction (3)
Haverfordwest County (2)	2-1	Croesyceiliog (3)
Guilsfield (2)	4-0	Mold Alexandra (3)
Llandudno Albion (3)	3-2	Rhyl (2)
Cwmamman United (2)	3-1	Rhayader Town (2)
Carno (3}	0-4	Gresford Athletic (2)
Bridgend Street (4)	4-3	Machen (6)
Cardiff Draconians (5)	1-2	Ton Pentre (2)
Llanrhaeadr (3)	3-0	FC Queens Park (2)
Caerau (Ely) (2)	0-1	Cwmbran Celtic (2)
Briton Ferry Llansawel (2)	3-1	Goytre United (2)
Abergavenny Town (3)	1-3	Panteg (4)
Denbigh Town (2)	4-3	Holyhead Hotspur (2)
Aberaeron (3)	1-6	Llanelli Town (2)
Flint Town United (2)	3-0	Llanfair United (3)
Cardiff Corinthians	0-4	Penydarren (5)
Monmouth Town (2)	4-1	Ynysygerwn (4)
Abermule (4)	0-4	Berriew (3)
Saltney Town (3)	6-0	Llanrwst United (3)
Caerphilly Athletic (5)	4-1(a.e.t.)	Carmarthen Stars (5)
Caernarfon Town (2)	5-1	Lex XI (3)
Llantwit Major (3)	3-2	Taff's Well (2)
Meliden (4)	0-4	Ruthin Town (2)
Pontyclun (4)	0–0(a.e.t.) (7–8 p)	Pencoed Athletic (5)
Holywell Town (2)	3-0	Corwen (3)
Pen-y-Bont (2)	1-0(a.e.t.)	Undy Athletic (2)
Airbus UK Broughton (2)	3-0	Bow Street (3)

== Second round ==
The draw for the second round was held on 8 October 2017.

Results:

Team 1	Score	Team 2
4 November
Goytre (2)	2-1	Briton Ferry Llansawel (2)
Haverfordwest County (2)	2-0	Aberbargoed Buds (3)
Airbus UK Broughton (2)	4-0	Saltney Town (3)
Pen-y-Bont (2)	2-1	Monmouth Town (2)
Brickfield Rangers (3)	2-3(a.e.t.)	Ruthin Town (2)
Buckley Town (3)	2-1	Llandudno Albion (3)
Ton Pentre (2)	1-2	Panteg (4)
Caernarfon Town (2)	4-1	Berriew (3)
Caersws (2)	1-2	Llanrhaeadr (3)
Porthmadog (2)	10-0	F.C. Penley (4)
Gresford Athletic (2)	5-1	Conwy Borough (3)
Holywell Town (2)	2-3	Guilsfield (2)
Llay Welfare (3)	1-3	Flint Town United (2)
Ammanford (3)	1-1(a.e.t.) (3-2 p)	Llantwit Major (3)
Caerphilly Athletic (5)	2-4	Penrhyncoch (2)
Cwmamman United (2)	3-0	Bridgend Street (4)
Cwmbran Celtic (2)	2-1	Llanelli Town (2)
Pencoed Athletic (5)	1-3	Pontypridd Town (3)
Penydarren (5)	2-1	STM Sports (3)
Llandudno Junction (3)	3-2(a.e.t.)	Denbigh Town (2)

== Third round ==
The draw for the third round was held on 6 November 2017.

Results:

Team 1	Score	Team 2
1 December
The New Saints (1)	6-0	Penrhyncoch (2)
2 December
Llandudno (1)	4-0	Gresford Athletic (2)
Newtown (1)	2-0	Guilsfield (2)
Llandudno Junction (3)	0-4	Penydarren (5)
Pontypridd Town (3)	3-1	Haverfordwest County (2)
Ammanford (3)	2-3	Carmarthen Town (1)
Buckley Town (3)	0-1	Flint Town United (2)
Pen-y-Bont (2)	1-3	Cardiff Metropolitan University (1)
Bangor City (1)	4-3	Cwmamman United (2)
Aberystwyth Town (1)	4-0	Bala Town (1)
Prestatyn Town (1)	0-3	Ruthin Town (2)
Llanrhaeadr (3)	3-2	Cefn Druids (1)
Connah's Quay Nomads (1)	3-0	Cwmbran Celtic (2)
Porthmadog (2)	7-2	Panteg (4)
Airbus UK Broughton (2)	3-2 (a.e.t.)	Goytre (2)
3 December
Caernarfon Town (2)	2-0	Barry Town United (1)

== Fourth round ==
The draw for the fourth round was held on 4 December 2017.

Results:

Team 1	Score	Team 2
26 January
Caernarfon Town (2)	1-3	The New Saints (1)
27 January
Llanrhaeadr (3)	2-3	Bangor City (1)
Pontypridd Town (3)	1-2	Penydarren (5)
Flint Town United (2)	2-2(a.e.t.) (3-4 p)	Newtown (1)
Connah's Quay Nomads (1)	3-1	Porthmadog (2)
Cardiff Metropolitan University (1)	0-1	Aberystwyth Town (1)
Llandudno (1)	4-3(a.e.t.)	Ruthin Town (2)
Airbus UK Broughton (2)	1-4	Carmarthen Town (1)

== Quarter-finals ==
The draw for the quarter-finals was held on 29 January 2018.

Results:

Team 1	Score	Team 2
4 March
Bangor City (1)	7-0	Penydarren (5)
6 March
Connah's Quay Nomads (1)	2-1	The New Saints (1)
Carmarthen Town (1)	1-3	Aberystwyth Town (1)
Llandudno (1)	0-2	Newtown (1)

== Semi-finals ==
The draw for the semi-finals was held on 5 March 2018. The matches were played at neutral venues.

Results:

Team 1	Score	Team 2
7/8 April
Connah's Quay Nomads (1)	6-1	Bangor City (1)
Newtown (1)	1-2	Aberystwyth Town (1)

== Final ==
The final was played on 6 May 2018.

Team 1	Score	Team 2
6 May
Aberystwyth Town	1 - 4	Connah's Quay Nomads
