= 2023–24 Ardal SW =

Ardal SW
- Season: 2023–24
- Champions: Penrhiwceiber Rangers
- Promoted: Penrhiwceiber Rangers
- Relegated: Mumbles Rangers; Penydarren BGC; Port Talbot Town

The 2023–24 Ardal SW season (also known as the 2023–24 Floodlighting and Electrical Services Ardal SW season for sponsorship reasons) was the third season of the new third-tier southern region football in Welsh football pyramid, part of the Ardal Leagues.

The winners (Penrhiwceiber Rangers) were promoted to the 2024–25 Cymru South. The runners-up (Cefn Cribwr) qualified for the Ardal Southern play-off, losing and remaining in the league. The bottom three teams (Mumbles Rangers, Penydarren BGC, and Port Talbot Town) were relegated to Tier 4.

== Teams ==
The league was made up of sixteen teams; ten teams remaining from the previous season, four teams promoted from Tier 4, and two teams relegated from the 2022–23 Cymru South.

The teams promoted from Tier 4 were Cardiff Corinthians and Canton from the South Wales Alliance League Premier Division, and South Gower and Morriston Town from the West Wales Premier League (replacing the relegated Ardal SE teams of Garden Village, Cwmamman United, and Dinas Powys). The teams relegated from the Cymru South were Swansea University and Ynyshir Albions (replacing the promoted Ardal SW teams of Caerau (Ely) and Baglan Dragons)). Since no team was relegated to the Ardal SE from the 2022–23 Cymru South, Treharris Athletic Western were transferred from the Ardal SW.

=== Stadia and locations ===
Locations of teams in the 2023–24 Ardal SW

| Team | Location | Home Ground | Capacity |
|---|---|---|---|
| AFC Llwydcoed | Llwydcoed | Welfare Ground | 1,000 |
| Canton Liberal | Canton | Lawrenny Avenue | |
| Cardiff Corinthians | Cardiff | The Riverside Ground | |
| Cardiff Draconians | Cardiff | Lydstep Park | 1,000 |
| Cefn Cribwr | Clydach Vale | King George V New Field | 900 |
| Morriston Town | Morriston | The Dingle Field | |
| Mumbles Rangers | Swansea | Sketty Lane | 1,500 |
| Penrhiwceiber Rangers | Penrhiwceiber | Glasbrook Field | 1,000 |
| Penydarren BGC | Penydarren | The Bont Playing Fields | 1,000 |
| Pontyclun | Pontyclun | Ivor Park | 1,000 |
| Port Talbot Town | Port Talbot | Victoria Road | 6,000 |
| Seven Sisters Onllwyn | Neath | Welfare Ground | 500 |
| South Gower | Scurlage | South Gower Sports Club | |
| Swansea University | Swansea | Sketty Lane | 1,000 |
| Ynyshir Albions | Ynyshir | The Oval | 250 |
| Ynysygerwn | Llandarcy | Llandarcy Academy of Sport | 1,000 |

Source: Ardal SW Ground Information

- (Cefn Cribwr are ground sharing at Cambrian & Clydach Vale, whilst Mumbles Rangers share at Swansea University)

== League table ==
| Pos | Team | Pld | W | D | L | GF | GA | GD | Pts | Promotion, qualification or relegation |
|---|---|---|---|---|---|---|---|---|---|---|
| 1 | Penrhiwceiber Rangers (C, P) | 30 | 20 | 4 | 6 | 56 | 31 | +25 | 64 | Promotion to Cymru South |
| 2 | Cefn Cribwr | 30 | 18 | 7 | 5 | 61 | 29 | +32 | 61 | Qualification for the Ardal Southern play-off |
| 3 | Cardiff Draconians | 30 | 15 | 7 | 8 | 58 | 42 | +16 | 52 | |
| 4 | Swansea University | 30 | 15 | 5 | 10 | 51 | 44 | +7 | 50 | |
| 5 | Ynyshir Albions | 30 | 15 | 3 | 12 | 48 | 45 | +3 | 48 | |
| 6 | Morriston Town | 30 | 14 | 5 | 11 | 48 | 41 | +7 | 47 | |
| 7 | South Gower | 30 | 14 | 4 | 12 | 58 | 44 | +14 | 46 | |
| 8 | Ynysygerwn | 30 | 12 | 8 | 10 | 50 | 38 | +12 | 44 | |
| 9 | Canton | 30 | 11 | 8 | 11 | 51 | 43 | +8 | 41 | |
| 10 | Seven Sisters Onllwyn | 30 | 12 | 3 | 15 | 39 | 68 | −29 | 39 | |
| 11 | AFC Llwydcoed | 30 | 11 | 5 | 14 | 50 | 55 | −5 | 38 | |
| 12 | Cardiff Corinthians | 30 | 10 | 7 | 13 | 45 | 52 | −7 | 37 | |
| 13 | Pontyclun | 30 | 8 | 8 | 14 | 36 | 43 | −7 | 32 | |
| 14 | Penydarren BGC (R) | 30 | 9 | 4 | 17 | 50 | 72 | −22 | 31 | Relegation to Tier 4 |
| 15 | Port Talbot Town (R) | 30 | 7 | 5 | 18 | 40 | 58 | −18 | 26 | Relegation to Tier 4 |
| 16 | Mumbles Rangers (R) | 30 | 6 | 3 | 21 | 36 | 72 | −36 | 21 | Relegation to Tier 4 |

Source: Non League Matters
Rules for classification: 1) Points; 2) Goal difference; 3) Goals scored; 4) Matches won; 5) Play-off.
(C) Champions; (P) Promoted; (R) Relegated

== Results ==
| Home \ Away | LWY | CAN | CDC | CDD | CFN | MOR | MUR | PNR | PNY | PTY | PTT | SSO | SGW | SWU | YNA | YNS |
|---|---|---|---|---|---|---|---|---|---|---|---|---|---|---|---|---|
| AFC Llwydcoed | — | 1–1 | 6–3 | 0–2 | 4–1 | 1–1 | 2–1 | 1–4 | 1–2 | 2–1 | 2–2 | 1–1 | 1–1 | 3–2 | 4–0 | 0–2 |
| Canton | 2–3 | — | 2–1 | 1–2 | 1–1 | 2–2 | 4–2 | 0–2 | 3–3 | 1–2 | 3–0 | 6–0 | 1–0 | 2–3 | 1–3 | 1–2 |
| Cardiff Corinthians | 1–0 | 1–4 | — | 1–1 | 1–0 | 0–2 | 2–2 | 1–3 | 2–3 | 1–2 | 2–0 | 1–1 | 0–2 | 1–0 | 7–2 | 2–1 |
| Cardiff Draconians | 2–0 | 0–0 | 1–4 | — | 0–1 | 4–4 | 3–2 | 3–0 | 4–0 | 2–2 | 3–1 | 6–0 | 3–2 | 0–4 | 0–1 | 1–1 |
| Cefn Cribwr | 2–1 | 3–1 | 1–1 | 1–4 | — | 4–0 | 6–2 | 0–3 | 3–1 | 2–0 | 0–0 | 5–1 | 1–1 | 1–2 | 1–0 | 3–0 |
| Morriston Town | 3–2 | 1–0 | 1–0 | 1–2 | 1–2 | — | 3–0 | 0–1 | 1–0 | 3–0 | 3–2 | 1–0 | 1–1 | 1–2 | 2–3 | 1–3 |
| Mumbles Rangers | 1–2 | 2–1 | 0–0 | 0–2 | 0–1 | 1–3 | — | 2–1 | 4–0 | 2–1 | 0–1 | 3–5 | 1–5 | 1–2 | 1–4 | 0–1 |
| Penrhiwceiber Rangers | 2–0 | 2–3 | 2–0 | 3–1 | 0–0 | 3–1 | 1–1 | — | 1–4 | 3–0 | 3–2 | 3–0 | 2–1 | 1–0 | 2–0 | 2–1 |
| Penydarren BGC | 2–3 | 0–1 | 1–2 | 3–4 | 1–4 | 3–2 | 2–1 | 2–1 | — | 0–1 | 6–4 | 4–3 | 0–3 | 2–2 | 0–4 | 0–1 |
| Pontyclun | 2–1 | 0–1 | 2–2 | 1–2 | 2–2 | 0–2 | 1–3 | 0–1 | 3–0 | — | 2–1 | 1–2 | 2–0 | 1–2 | 0–1 | 1–1 |
| Port Talbot Town | 3–2 | 3–0 | 1–3 | 1–1 | 0–1 | 2–1 | 3–0 | 1–1 | 2–3 | 1–1 | — | 0–2 | 3–4 | 0–2 | 0–3 | 3–1 |
| Seven Sisters Onllwyn | 4–0 | 0–4 | 2–1 | 1–0 | 0–4 | 0–0 | 3–1 | 3–4 | 2–1 | 0–4 | 1–0 | — | 0–4 | 3–0 | 2–0 | 0–3 |
| South Gower | 0–2 | 0–1 | 2–1 | 2–3 | 1–5 | 0–3 | 4–0 | 1–2 | 3–2 | 1–1 | 0–1 | 4–1 | — | 3–0 | 3–0 | 0–3 |
| Swansea University | 4–2 | 2–2 | 1–2 | 1–1 | 1–3 | 2–1 | 4–0 | 0–1 | 2–2 | 1–1 | 3–1 | 3–0 | 2–5 | — | 1–4 | 1–0 |
| Ynyshir Albions | 1–0 | 1–1 | 6–1 | 2–1 | 0–3 | 0–1 | 1–2 | 1–0 | 1–1 | 1–0 | 2–1 | 3–0 | 2–3 | 0–1 | — | 2–2 |
| Ynysygerwn | 2–3 | 1–1 | 1–1 | 2–0 | 0–0 | 1–2 | 4–1 | 2–2 | 4–2 | 2–2 | 3–1 | 1–3 | 1–2 | 0–1 | 4–0 | — |

Source: Non League Matters
Legend: Blue = home team win; Yellow = draw; Red = away team win.
