= South Wales FA Senior Cup =

Regional knock-out competition for clubs

- Founded: 1893
- Region: Wales
- Current champions: Port Talbot Town (2nd Title)
- Most championships: Cardiff City/ Barry Town (15 titles)
- 2025-26

The South Wales FA Senior Cup (known as the Hugh James Senior Cup) is the regional knock-out competition for clubs beneath the umbrella of the South Wales Football Association, in the Welsh Football Pyramid in South Wales.

== History ==
The cup was originally called the South Wales & Monmouthshire Senior Cup, run by the South Wales and Monmouthshire Football Association until after the 1967–68 season.

== Previous winners ==
Information sourced from the South Wales Football Association website.

=== 1890s ===
- 1893–94: – Builth
- 1894–95: – Rhayader
- 1895–96: – Barry District & Brecon
- 1896–97: – Rogerstone
- 1897–98: – Rogerstone
- 1898–99: – Barry Unionists
- 1899–1900: – Aberystwyth

=== 1900s ===
- 1900–01: – Barry Unionists
- 1901–02: – Aberdare
- 1902–03: – Aberaman
- 1903–04: – Treharris
- 1904–05: – Ebbw Vale
- 1905–06: – Treharris
- 1906–07: – Treharris
- 1907–08: – Ton Pentre
- 1908–09: – Ton Pentre
- 1909–10: – Ton Pentre

=== 1910s ===
- 1910–11: – Treharris
- 1911–12: – Merthyr Town
- 1912–13: – Aberdare
- 1913–14: – Cardiff City
- 1914–15: – Ton Pentre
- 1915–16: – No competition - World War One
- 1916–17: – No competition - World War One
- 1917–18: – No competition - World War One
- 1918–19: – No competition - World War One
- 1919–20: – Mid Rhondda

=== 1920s ===
- 1920–21: – Ton Pentre
- 1921–22: – Cardiff City
- 1922–23: – Cardiff City
- 1923–24: – Cardiff City
- 1924–25: – Pontypridd
- 1925–26: – Aberdare & Mid Rhondda
- 1926–27: – Barry
- 1927–28: – Cardiff City
- 1928–29: – Cardiff City
- 1929–30: – Swansea Town

=== 1930s ===
- 1930–31: – Lovells Athletic
- 1931–32: – Swansea Town
- 1932–33: – Swansea Town
- 1933–34: – Swansea Town
- 1934–35: – Lovells Athletic
- 1935–36: – Barry
- 1936–37: – Lovells Athletic
- 1937–38: – Barry
- 1938–39: – Barry
- 1939–40: – No competition - World War Two

=== 1940s ===
- 1940–41: – No competition - World War Two
- 1941–42: – No competition - World War Two
- 1942–43: – No competition - World War Two
- 1943–44: – No competition - World War Two
- 1944–45: – No competition - World War Two
- 1945–46: – Merthyr Tydfil
- 1946–47: – Troedyrhiw
- 1947–48: – Ton Pentre
- 1948–49: – Lovells Athletic
- 1949–50: – Merthyr Tydfil

=== 1950s ===
- 1950–51: – Merthyr Tydfil
- 1951–52: – Merthyr Tydfil
- 1952–53: – Barry Town
- 1953–54: – Barry Town
- 1954–55: – Lovells Athletic
- 1955–56: – Merthyr Tydfil
- 1956–57: – Cwmparc
- 1957–58: – Cardiff City
- 1958–59: – Barry Town
- 1959–60: – Barry Town

=== 1960s ===
- 1960–61: – Ton Pentre
- 1961–62: – Ton Pentre
- 1962–63: – Cardiff City
- 1963–64: – Ton Pentre
- 1964–65: – Abergavenny Thursdays
- 1965–66: – Barry Town
- 1966–67: – Cardiff College of Education
- 1967–68: – Merthyr Tydfil
- 1968–69: – Cardiff City
- 1969–70: – Cardiff City

=== 1970s ===
- 1970–71: – Cardiff City
- 1971–72: – Cardiff City
- 1972–73: – Cardiff City
- 1973–74: – Cardiff City
- 1974–75: – Cardiff City
- 1975–76: – Barry Town
- 1976–77: – Merthyr Tydfil
- 1977–78: – Barry Town
- 1978–79: – Maesteg Park Athletic
- 1979–80: – Merthyr Tydfil

=== 1980s ===
- 1980–81: – Sully
- 1981–82: – Sully
- 1982–83: – Ton Pentre
- 1983–84: – Barry Town
- 1984–85: – Merthyr Tydfil
- 1985–86: – Sully
- 1986–87: – Barry Town
- 1987–88: – Barry Town
- 1988–89: – Merthyr Tydfil
- 1989–90: – Merthyr Tydfil

=== 1990s ===
- 1990–91: – Maesteg Park
- 1991–92: – Barry Town
- 1992–93: – Ton Pentre
- 1993–94: – No competition
- 1994–95: – No competition
- 1995–96: – No competition
- 1996–97: – No competition
- 1997–98: – No competition
- 1998–99: – No competition
- 1999–2000: – No competition

=== 2000s ===
- 2000–01: – No competition
- 2001–02: – No competition
- 2002–03: – Stanleytown
- 2003–04: – Ynyshir Albions
- 2004–05: – Carnetown
- 2005–06: – Grange Albion
- 2006–07: – Pantyscallog Village Juniors
- 2007–08: – Bridgend Street
- 2008–09: – Penydarren BGC
- 2009–10: – Rhoose

=== 2010s ===
- 2010–11: – Llantwit Major
- 2011–12: – Cwmbach Royal Stars
- 2012–13: – STM Sports
- 2013–14: – Penydarren BGC
- 2014–15: – Cornelly United
- 2015–16: – Taffs Well
- 2016–17: – Taffs Well
- 2017–18: – AFC Whitchurch
- 2018–19: – Llanrumney United
- 2019–20: – Competition cancelled - Covid-19 pandemic

=== 2020s ===
- 2020–21: – No competition - Covid-19 pandemic
- 2021–22: – Cwrt Rawlin
- 2022–23: – Ton Pentre
- 2023–24: – FC Cwmaman
- 2024–25: – Port Talbot Town
- 2025–26: – Port Talbot Town

=== Number of competition wins ===
- Barry / Barry Town — 15
- Cardiff City – 15
- Ton Pentre – 12
- Merthyr Tydfil – 11
- Lovells Athletic – 5
- Swansea Town – 4
- Treharris – 4
- Sully– 3
- Barry Unionists –2
- Aberdare – 2
- Maesteg Park/ Maesteg Park Athletic – 2
- Penydarren BGC – 2
- Port Talbot Town - 2
- Rogerstone– 2
- Taffs Well – 2
- Aberaman – 1
- Abergavenny Thursdays – 1
- Aberystwyth – 1
- AFC Whitchurch – 1
- Barry District & Brecon – 1
- Bridgend Street – 1
- Builth – 1
- Cardiff College of Education – 1
- Carnetown – 1
- Cornelly United – 1
- Cwmbach Royal Stars – 1
- Cwmparc – 1
- Cwrt Rawlin – 1
- Ebbw Vale – 1
- FC Cwmaman – 1
- Llanrumney United – 1
- Llantwit Major – 1
- Merthyr Town – 1
- Mid Rhondda – 1
- Mid Rhondda & Aberdare – 1
- Pantyscallog Village Juniors – 1
- Pontypridd – 1
- Rhayader – 1
- Rhoose – 1
- Stanleytown – 1
- Troedyrhiw – 1
- STM Sports – 1
- Ynyshir Albions – 1
