= Merthyr & District League =

- Founded: 1913
- Country: Wales
- Number of clubs: 8
- Level on pyramid: 7
- Promotion to: South Wales Premier League
- Current champions: Trelewis Welfare (2025–26)

The Merthyr Tydfil League is a football league covering the town of Merthyr Tydfil and surrounding areas in Merthyr Tydfil County Borough, South Wales. The league is in the seventh tier of the Welsh football league system.

== Divisions ==
The league is composed of one division. It has previously operated with multiple divisions. In the 1990s the league operated with three senior divisions, and a second tier division operated up until the 2016–17 season. Following on from this the league suffered from a lack of clubs, with only seven clubs completing the 2018–19 season, and ten, including two reserve sides making up the league for the 2019–20 season. For the 2020–21 season the league was not planned to function with eight of the league's teams instead being admitted to the Aberdare Valley League. The league returned for the 2021–22 season with a Premier Division of five clubs and a First Division of seven clubs. For the 2022–23 season, the league changed to just a Premier Division, sponsored by RTM Brickwork.

=== Member clubs 2026-27 ===
The following clubs are competing in the Merthyr & District League during the 2025–26 season.

==== Premier Division ====
- Aberfan
- Aberfan Rangers
- Baili Glas
- Gurnos FC
- Gurnos FC (development)
- Penydarren BGC (reserves)
- Red Lion BGC (reserves)
- Treharris Athletic Western (reserves)

== Promotion and relegation ==
Promotion from the Premier Division is possible to the lowest tier of the South Wales Premier League, with the champion of the league playing the other tier 7 champions from the South Wales regional leagues via play-off games to determine promotion.

== Champions (Top Tier Division) ==
- 1971–72: Hoover Sports
- 1988–89: Gellideg SC
- 1990–91: Mount Pleasant
- 1991–92: Hoover Sports
- 1992–93: Mount Pleasant
- 1993–94: Hoover Sports
- 1994–95: Gellideg SC
- 1995–96: Troedyrhiw B.C.
- 1996–97: Gellideg
- 1997–98: Bluebirds
- 2001–02: Gurnos Social Bluebirds
- 2006–07: Courthouse
- 2007–08: Bluebirds
- 2008–09: Bluebirds
- 2009–10: Bluebirds
- 2010–11: Bluebirds
- 2011–12: Aberfan SDC
- 2012–13: Pant
- 2013–14: Bluebirds
- 2014–15: Pantyscallog VJ
- 2015–16: Pantyscallog VJ
- 2016–17: Hills Plymouth
- 2017–18: Hills Plymouth
- 2018–19: Navi
- 2019–20: Aber Wanderers
- 2020–21: No competition
- 2021–22: Georgetown BGC
- 2022–23: Pantyscallog Village
- 2023–24: Pantyscallog Village (promoted to SW Premier League)
- 2024–25: Heolgerrig Red Lion Community
- 2025–26: Trelewis Welfare
