= Treherbert BGC =

Football club based in Rhondda Cynon Taf

- Full name: Treherbert Boys and Girls Club
- Founded: 1935
- Ground: Baglan Field
- League: Ardal SW League
- 2024–25: Ardal SW League, 9th of 16
Home colours	Away colours

Treherbert BGC is a Welsh football club based in Treherbert, Rhondda Cynon Taf. The team currently plays in the Ardal SW League.

== History ==
Treherbert Boys and Girls Club was founded in 1935. They formed a senior football team in 2017, and won the Rhondda & District League Division One in their first season.

In 2020, the club were champions of the Rhondda & District League Premier Division. They had initially missed out on promotion to the South Wales Alliance League Division Two by points per game, but in August a 15 point deduction for Gwynfi United confirmed Treherbert's promotion to the South Wales Alliance League. The 2020–21 season was not played due to the COVID-19 pandemic, but in the following two seasons they were promoted twice, as Division Two champions and Division One runners-up.

The club competed in the 2023–24 Welsh Cup, reaching the second qualifying round, where they lost 5–1 to Mumbles Rangers.

Treherbert finished third in the 2023–24 South Wales Alliance League Premier Division, gaining promotion to the Ardal Leagues.

In the 2024–25 season, they finished 9th in their first season in the Ardal South West. They also reached the first round of the 2024–25 Welsh Cup, losing on penalties after a 1–1 draw against Clwb Cymric.

The following season, the club again entered the Welsh Cup, but lost in the first qualifying round against fifth-tier AFC Wattstown.

== Ground ==
The club plays at Baglan Field in the Penyrenglyn area of Treherbert. In 2021 Rhondda Cynon Taf County Borough Council announced plans to create a 3G facility at Baglan Field, which was opened by Rob Page in November 2022.

The 3G pitch at Baglan Field has also been used by Baglan FC, Treorchy RFC, Treherbert RFC, Rhondda Schools Rugby, and Ynyshir Albions seconds. The small-sided pitches are used by Penyrenglyn school.

== Honours ==
- South Wales Alliance League Division One – Runners-up: 2022–23
- South Wales Alliance League Division Two – Champions: 2021–22
- Rhondda & District League Premier Division – Champions: 2019–20
- Rhondda & District League Premier Division – Runners-up: 2018–19
- Rhondda & District League Division One – Champions: 2017–18
