= Montgomeryshire Challenge Cup =

Annual football tournament in Wales

- Founded: 1906
- Current champions: Llanrhaeadr
- Most championships: Caersws (31 times)
- 2025–26

The Montgomeryshire Challenge Cup is a football knockout tournament involving teams from Mid Wales. The competition was established for the 1906–07 season. Caersws are the most successful club in the competition's history.

== Previous winners ==
=== 1900s ===
- 1906–07: – Royal Welsh Warehouse
- 1907–08: – Royal Welsh Warehouse
- 1908–09: – Montgomery Town
- 1909–10: – Llanidloes Town

=== 1910s ===
- 1910–11: – Llanfyllin Town
- 1911–12: – Llanfyllin Town
- 1912–13: – Llanidloes Town
- 1913–14: – Royal Welsh Warehouse
- 1914–15: – No competition - World War One
- 1915–16: – No competition - World War One
- 1916–17: – No competition - World War One
- 1917–18: – No competition - World War One
- 1918–19: – No competition - World War One
- 1919–20: – Llanidloes Town

=== 1920s ===
- 1920–21: – Llanidloes Town
- 1921–22: – Llanidloes Town
- 1922–23: – Newtown
- 1923–24: – Llanfyllin Town
- 1924–25: – Llanidloes Town
- 1925–26: – Llanymynech
- 1926–27: – Llanymynech
- 1927–28: – Llanidloes Town
- 1928–29: – Llanidloes Town
- 1929–30: – Llanidloes Town

=== 1930s ===
- 1930–31: – Llanidloes Town
- 1931–32: – Llanidloes Town
- 1932–33: – Llanidloes Town
- 1933–34: – Llanidloes Town
- 1934–35: – Llanidloes Town
- 1935–36: – Llanymynech
- 1936–37: – Newtown
- 1937–38: – Machynlleth
- 1938–39: – Llanidloes Town
- 1939–40: – No competition - World War Two

=== 1940s ===
- 1940–41: – No competition - World War Two
- 1941–42: – No competition - World War Two
- 1942–43: – No competition - World War Two
- 1943–44: – No competition - World War Two
- 1944–45: – No competition - World War Two
- 1945–46: – Llanymynech Rovers
- 1946–47: – Llanidloes Town
- 1947–48: – Newtown
- 1948–49: – Llanidloes Town
- 1949–50: – Newtown

=== 1950s ===
- 1950–51: – Welshpool
- 1951–52: – Newtown
- 1952–53: – Caersws
- 1953–54: – Llanidloes Town
- 1954–55: – Newtown
- 1955–56: – Newtown
- 1956–57: – Newtown
- 1957–58: – Newtown
- 1958–59: – Montgomery Town
- 1959–60: – Caersws

=== 1960s ===
- 1960–61: – Llanymynech Rovers
- 1961–62: – Llanidloes Town
- 1962–63: – Caersws
- 1963–64: – Llanymynech Rovers
- 1964–65: – Llanidloes Town
- 1965–66: – Newtown
- 1966–67: – Newtown
- 1967–68: – Newtown
- 1968–69: – Newtown
- 1969–70: – Caersws

=== 1970s ===
- 1970–71: – Caersws
- 1971–72: – Caersws
- 1972–73: – Llanidloes Town
- 1973–74: – Llanfechain
- 1974–75: – Caersws
- 1975–76: – Llanidloes Town
- 1976–77: – Caersws
- 1977–78: – Caersws
- 1978–79: – Newtown
- 1979–80: – Llanidloes Town

=== 1980s ===
- 1980–81: – Montgomery Town
- 1981–82: – Newtown
- 1982–83: – Carno
- 1983–84: – Caersws
- 1984–85: – Caersws
- 1985–86: – Caersws
- 1986–87: – Caersws
- 1987–88: – Caersws
- 1988–89: – Caersws
- 1989–90: – Caersws

=== 1990s ===
- 1990–91: – Caersws
- 1991–92: – Caersws
- 1992–93: – Waterloo Rovers
- 1993–94: – Caersws
- 1994–95: – Caersws
- 1995–96: – Newtown
- 1996–97: – Caersws
- 1997–98: – Caersws
- 1998–99: – Caersws
- 1999–2000: – Welshpool Town

=== 2000s ===
- 2000–01: – Caersws
- 2001–02: – Caersws
- 2002–03: – Caersws
- 2003–04: – Caersws
- 2004–05: – Caersws
- 2005–06: – Caersws
- 2006–07: – Caersws
- 2007–08: – Carno
- 2008–09: – Newtown
- 2009–10: – Montgomery Town

=== 2010s ===
- 2010–11: – Montgomery Town
- 2011–12: – Montgomery Town
- 2012–13: – Four Crosses
- 2013–14: – Carno
- 2014–15: – Llanfair United
- 2015–16: – Llanfair United
- 2016–17: – Llanfair United
- 2017–18: – Four Crosses
- 2018–19: – Llanrhaeadr
- 2019–20: – Competition abandoned due to Coronavirus pandemic

=== 2020s ===
- 2020–21: – No competition - Covid-19 pandemic
- 2021–22: – Llanidloes Town
- 2022–23: – Llanidloes Town
- 2023–24: – Llanidloes Town
- 2024–25: – Caersws
- 2025–26: – Llanrhaeadr

=== Number of cup wins by clubs ===
- Caersws – 31
- Llanidloes Town – 25
- Newtown – 17
- Llanymynech – 6
- Montgomery Town – 5
- Carno – 3
- Llanfair United – 3
- Royal Welsh Warehouse – 3
- Four Crosses – 2
- Llanrhaeadr – 2
- Welshpool – 2
- Llanfechain – 1
- Machynlleth – 1
- Waterloo Rovers – 1
