= Ton & Gelli BC =

Association football club in Wales

Ton & Gelli
- Full name: Ton & Gelli Boys & Girls Football Club
- Founded: 1925
- Ground: Ynys Park
- Manager: Paul Gillard
- League: Rhondda & District League Championship
- 2025–26: Rhondda & District League Championship 5th of 7

Ton & Gelli Boys & Girls Football Club are a Welsh football club from Ton Pentre in Rhondda Cynon Taf, Wales.

== History ==
The club were formed in 1925. They were reformed for the 1964–65 season and played in the Rhondda League, where they were champions in the 1968–69 season. They then entered the South Wales Amateur League in the 1970–71 season. The 1970s were a period of success for the club, being league champions twice in 1973–74 and 1977–78 and runners-up in 1974–75 and 1976–77.

In 2015–16 the club joined the newly formed South Wales Alliance League as a Division One club, finishing third and gaining promotion to the Premier Division.

== Honours ==
The club's honours include:

- South Wales Amateur League Division One
  - Champions: 1973–74, 1977–78
  - Runners up: 1974–75, 1976–77
- South Wales Amateur League Division Two
  - Champions: 2009–10
  - Runners up: 2001–02,
- Rhondda & District League
  - Champions: 1968–69
