= Lewistown F.C. =

Defunct Association football club in Wales

Lewistown Football Club
- League: South Wales Senior League Division One
- 2013–14: Resigned

Lewistown F.C. were a Welsh football club from the village of Lewistown in Wales. They played in the Welsh Football League for 39 seasons, before leaving the league after the 1983–84 season. Other versions of the club played in the Bridgend & District League and South Wales Senior League until the 2013–14 season.

== History ==
=== Lewistown in the Welsh Football League ===
The club joined the Welsh Football League Division Two Western Section in 1945–46 At the end of the 1971–72 season they were runners up in Division Two to Sully, gaining promotion to Division One, where they finished as champions gaining promotion to the Premier Division. They played in Welsh Football League until the end of the 1983–84 season when they left the league.

=== Pant yr Awel ===
A club known as Pant yr Awel played in the Bridgend & District League, finishing as league champions in the 1998–99 and 1999–2000 seasons, gaining promotion to the South Wales Senior League Division Two. At the end of the 2001–02 season they finished as runners-up gaining promotion to Division One.

=== Lewistown in the South Wales Senior League ===
They played in this division for a number of seasons before changing their name to Lewistown in 2007. The club continued to play in the league until the 2013–14 season when they resigned from the league and their record was expunged.

== Honours ==
- Welsh Football League Division One (1): Champions: 1972–73
- Welsh Football League Division Two (1): Runners-up: 1971–72
- South Wales Senior League Division Two – Runners-up (1): 2001–02 (as Pant yr Awel)
- Bridgend & District League Premier Division – Champions (2): 1998–99, 1999–2000 (as Pant yr Awel)
- Bridgend & District League Premier Division – Runners-up (1): 2001–02 (reserves) (as Pant yr Awel)
