= Bridgend & District League =

- Founded: 1928
- Country: Wales
- Number of clubs: 33
- Level on pyramid: 7–9
- Promotion to: South Wales Premier League
- Domestic cup(s): WT John Open Cup; Premier Division Cup
- Current champions: Bryntirion Athletic (2025–26)
- Website: Bridgend & District League

The Bridgend & District League is a football league covering the town of Bridgend and surrounding areas in South Wales. The leagues are at the seventh, eighth and ninth levels of the Welsh football league system.

== Area ==
The radius of the league covers Ogmore Valley, the Llynfi Valley, Bridgend, the Garw Valley and Gilfach. The league's eastern side is Llanharry and its western side is Cefn Cribwr.

== Divisions ==
The league is composed of three divisions.

=== Member clubs 2026–27 ===
==== Premier Division ====
- Brackla
- Bridgend Town
- Broadlands
- Brynna
- Bryntirion Athletic
- Carn Rovers
- Llangynwyd Rangers
- Llanharan
- Maesteg Park
- Penyfai
- Sarn
- Tondu Robins

==== Division One ====
- Bettws (reserves)
- Bridgend Town (reserves)
- Brynna (reserves)
- Caerau All Whites (reserves)
- Cefn Cribwr (reserves)
- Llangeinor (reserves)
- Llangynwyd Rangers (reserves)
- Llanharry
- Llanilid & Bryncae Community
- Maesteg Park (reserves)
- Pencoed Athletic (reserves)
- Red Valley

==== Division Two ====
- Brackla (reserves)
- Broadlands (reserves)
- Brynna (thirds)
- Bryntirion Athletic (reserves)
- Carn Rovers (reserves)
- Cefn Cribwr (thirds)
- Garw SBGC
- Llangeinor (thirds)
- Llanharan (reserves)
- Llanilid & Bryncae Community (reserves)
- Llynfi United
- Penyfai (reserves)
- Sarn (reserves)

== Promotion and relegation ==
Promotion from the Premier Division is possible to the lowest tier of the South Wales Premier League, with the champion of the league playing the other tier 7 champions from the South Wales regional leagues via play-off games to determine promotion.

== Champions (Premier Division) ==
Information on all winners between 1980–81 and 2015–16 sourced from the league's website.

- 1948–49: – Pencoed Athletic
- 1979–80: – Porthcawl Town
- 1980–81: – Tondu Robins
- 1981–82: – Llanharan
- 1982–83: – Tondu Robins
- 1983–84: – Cefn Cribwr
- 1984–85: – Maesteg Rangers
- 1985–86: – Bettws
- 1986–87: – Cefn Cribwr
- 1987–88: – Cefn Cribwr
- 1988–89: – Maesteg Rangers
- 1989–90: – Llangynwyd Rangers
- 1990–91: – Bettws
- 1991–92: – Maesteg Rangers
- 1992–93: – Llanharry
- 1993–94: – Coytrahen
- 1994–95: – Caerau All Whites
- 1995–96: – Caerau All Whites
- 1996–97: – Bettws
- 1997–98: – Brynna
- 1998–99: – Pant yr Awel
- 1999–2000: – Pant yr Awel
- 2000–01: – Bettws
- 2001–02: – Tondu Robins
- 2002–03: – Caerau All Whites
- 2003–04: – Llangynwyd Rangers
- 2004–05: – St Athans
- 2005–06: – Brynna
- 2006–07: – Gilfach Goch 'A'
- 2007–08: – G.W.R.
- 2008–09: – Llanharan
- 2009–10: – Caerau BC
- 2010–11: – Brackla
- 2011–12: – Broadlands
- 2012–13: – Brackla
- 2013–14: – Cefn Cribwr
- 2014–15: – Brackla
- 2015–16: – Llanharry
- 2016–17: – Llanharry
- 2017–18: – Llangeinor
- 2018–19: – Maesteg Park
- 2019–20: – Bettws
- 2020–21: – League cancelled due to Coronavirus pandemic
- 2021–22: – Brackla
- 2022–23: – Caerau All Whites
- 2023–24: – Caerau All Whites (promoted to SW Premier League)
- 2024–25: – Brynna
- 2025–26: – Bryntirion Athletic
