= Llangeinor A.F.C. =

Association football club in Wales

Llangeinor FC
- Full name: Llangeinor Football Club
- Nicknames: Llan, The Rags
- Ground: Llangeinor Park
- Capacity: 1,000
- Manager: Simon Livick
- League: South Wales Premier League Championship Division
- 2025–26: South Wales Premier League Division Championship Division, 3rd of 12
| Home colours | Away colours |

Llangeinor Football Club are an association football club based in the village of Llangeinor near Bridgend, Wales. The club plays in both the South Wales Premier League Championship Division and the Bridgend & District League in South Wales. Llangeinor have a history of football going back to before the Second World War, when football was played at Pandy Woods. The move to Llangeinor Park came after a brief spell playing on Llangeinor Common.

They currently play in South Wales Alliance League Division 2, Bridgend and District Division 1 and Division 2. They also have a team playing in the local Sunday League Second Division.

Llangeinor withdrew from the Welsh Football League Division Three in December 2011.

== Board Members ==
- Chairman: Brendan McGrail
- Secretary : Angela Loosmore
- Treasurer :
- Football Secretary : Paul Davies
- Assistant Football Secretary :

== Records ==
- Record Attendance Approx 370 ( v Bettws 2007–08 )

== Honours ==
- Bridgend & District League — Premier Division League Champions: 2017–18 - First Team
- Bridgend & District League — Division 2 League Cup Winners: 2016–17 - Second Team
- Bridgend & District League — Division One Champions: 2010–11- Second Team
- Bridgend & District League — Division One Runners-Up: 2004–05
- Bridgend & District League — Division One Runners-Up: 2000–01
- Bridgend & District League — Division One Champions: 1994–95
- Bridgend & District League — Division One Runners-Up: 1988–89
- Bridgend & District League — Division One Cup Runners-Up: 1987–88
- Bridgend & District League — Division One Cup Runners-Up: 1987–88
- Bridgend & District League — Division One Cup Winners: 1983–84
- South Wales Premier League John Owen Cup – Runners-up: 2025–26

== Junior Side - Llangeinor Rangers ==
Established in 2002, Llangeinor Rangers is a Junior Section which run teams from Under 7 to Under 16. Many of the current squad of players have come through the Junior Section, with three players still playing from the original Rangers side that was developed in 2002, Anthony Bale, Gareth Taylor and Jack Taylor. See external links for more information on the junior section.

== Other teams ==
Llangeinor Football Club are represented by a number of teams in different sporting areas. Currently at the club, there are two Pool teams playing in the Garw Valley Pool League and one Pool team playing in the Ogmore Vale Summer Pool League. Also representing the club is a Darts team playing in the Aberkenfig Darts League.
