= Ardal South Cup =

- Founded: 2020
- Current champions: Pure Swansea
- Most championships: Pure Swansea (2 wins)
- 2025–26

The Ardal Southern Cup is a football knockout tournament involving teams who play in the tier three Ardal South East and South West Leagues, administered by the Football Association of Wales.

== Competition history ==
The first season of the competition was meant to be the 2020–21 season but the competition was cancelled due to the Coronavirus pandemic. The competition instead started in the 2021–22 season.

== Past winners ==
=== 2020s ===
- 2020–21: – No competition
- 2021–22: – Trethomas Bluebirds
- 2022–23: – Cefn Cribwr
- 2023–24: – Swansea University
- 2024–25: – Cardiff Corinthians
- 2025–26: – Pure Swansea

== Details of competition finals ==
Season	Winners	Score	Runners-up	Date	Other Info
2021–22	Trethomas Bluebirds	1–0	Cardiff Draconians	25 May 2022	played at Penydarren B.G.C.
2022–23	Cefn Cribwr	1–0	Garden Village	30 May 2023	played at Penybont F.C.
2023–24	Swansea University	3–2	Cefn Cribwr	30 May 2024	played at Penybont F.C.
2024–25	Cardiff Corinthians	5–2	Chepstow Town	16 May 2025	played at Taff's Well F.C.
2025–26	Pure Swansea	5–2	Caerphilly Athletic	14 May 2026	played at Penybont F.C.

== Number of times by winning clubs since 2020s ==
- Cardiff Corinthians – 1 win
- Cefn Cribwr – 1 win
- Swansea University – 1 win
- Trethomas Bluebirds – 1 win

== See also ==
- Ardal North Cup, the corresponding cup for clubs from the two northern Ardal Leagues.
