= Rhondda & District League =

- Founded: 1907
- Country: Wales
- Number of clubs: 13
- Level on pyramid: 7
- Promotion to: South Wales Premier League
- Current champions: Tonypandy Albion (2025–26)

The Rhondda Valley League (currently the Carol Hosking Rhondda & District League for sponsorship reasons) is a football league covering the Rhondda and surrounding areas in South Wales. The league is at the seventh level of the Welsh football league system.

== History ==
The Rhondda & District Football League was formed on 7 June 1907. The league was originally called The Rhondda Junior League.

The original clubs elected to the league were:

- First Division: Ton-Pentre Thistles, Maindy Crescents, Pentre Blue and Whites, Mill Vue, Porth United and (Tre)Hafod Juniors
- Second Division: Ton-Pentre Juniors, Cwmparc Crescents, Ynyshir Albion, Tylorstown Crescents, Porth Reserves and Cymmer United.

In 1927 the league was called The Rhondda Valley (Amateur) Football League. At the time some clubs in the league were made up entirely of unemployed men. This resulted in the North Rhondda League being created because clubs were unable to afford travelling expenses. In 1929 the North Rhondda League was affiliated and in 1933 it was renamed The Upper Rhondda League. The leagues remained separated until the 1962–63 season when they reformed back into one league.

In 1931 a third League was formed called the Rhondda Fach League, but this dissolved after the 1937–38 season.

Throughout the Second World War The Rhondda League was one of the very few leagues to continue playing football; because of the thousands of miners working in the collieries in the Rhondda.

== Divisions ==
=== Member clubs 2026–27 ===
==== Premiership ====
- Banog
- Cambrian United (development)
- Ely Valley
- Ferndale BGC
- Llwynypia BGC
- Penrhiwfer
- Penygraig BGC
- The Baglan
- Ton & Gelli BGC
- Tonyrefail BGC (reserves)
- Tonyrefail Welfare
- Ynyscynon
- Ynyshir Albions (reserves)

== Promotion and relegation ==
Promotion from the Premier League is possible to the lowest tier of the South Wales Premier League, with the champion of the league playing the other tier 7 champions from the South Wales regional leagues via play-off games to determine promotion.

== Champions of the Top division ==
Information for champions of the top division from 1954–55 to 2006–07 is sourced from a booklet to commemorate 100 Years of Football in the Rhondda League.

=== 1900s ===
- 1907–08: – Trehafod

=== 1930s ===
- 1936–37: – Rhondda Transport

=== 1950s ===
- 1950–51: –
- 1951–52: –
- 1952–53: –
- 1953–54: –
- 1954–55: – Dinas Corries
- 1955–56: – Ystrad Athletic
- 1956–57: – Trebanog
- 1957–58: – Pentre BC
- 1958–59: – Pentre BC
- 1959–60: – Pentre BC

=== 1960s ===
- 1960–61: – Blaencwm
- 1961–62: – Beatus
- 1962–63: – Llwynypia BC
- 1963–64: – Beatus
- 1964–65: – Dare Inglis
- 1965–66: – Dare Inglis
- 1966–67: – Dare Inglis
- 1967–68: – Rest Assured
- 1968–69: – Ton & Gelli BC
- 1969–70: – Cambrian United

=== 1970s ===
- 1970–71: – Cambrian United
- 1971–72: – Cambrian United
- 1972–73: – Wattstown United
- 1973–74: – Gilfach United
- 1974–75: – Cambrian United
- 1975–76: – Gilfach United
- 1976–77: – Ferndale 'A'
- 1977–78: – Gilfach United
- 1978–79: – Ystrad BC
- 1979–80: – Penrhiwfer

=== 1980s ===
- 1980–81: – Ystrad BC
- 1981–82: – Ystrad BC
- 1982–83: – Blaencwm
- 1983–84: – Treorchy BC
- 1984–85: – Ferndale BC
- 1985–86: – Kensington
- 1986–87: – Ferndale BC
- 1987–88: – Ferndale BC
- 1988–89: – Kensington
- 1989–90: – Blaencwm

=== 1990s ===
- 1990–91: – Ynyshir/ Wattstown BGC
- 1991–92: – Stanleytown
- 1992–93: – Naval
- 1993–94: – Trebanog Workingmens
- 1994–95: – Penrhiwfer
- 1995–96: – Llwynypia WMC
- 1996–97: – Ynyshir Albions
- 1997–98: – Penrhys Athletic
- 1998–99: – Penrhys United
- 1999–2000: – Tonypandy Naval

=== 2000s ===
- 2000–01: – Tonyrefail BC
- 2001–02: – Penrhys United
- 2002–03: – Ferndale BC
- 2003–04: – Trebanog Rangers
- 2004–05: – Turberville Arms
- 2005–06: – Cambrian & Clydach BGC
- 2006–07: – Tonypandy Albion
- 2007–08: – Wyndham
- 2008–09: – Ynyshir/ Wattstown BGC
- 2009–10: – Llwynypia BGC

=== 2010s ===
- 2010–11: – Max United
- 2011–12: – Sporting Marvels
- 2012–13: – Sporting Marvels
- 2013–14: – Penygraig United
- 2014–15: – Gelli Hibs
- 2015–16: – Trebanog
- 2016–17: – Blaenrhondda
- 2017–18: – AFC Wattstown
- 2018–19: – Penygraig United
- 2019–20: – Treherbert BGC

=== 2020s ===
- 2020–21: – Competition cancelled due to Coronavirus pandemic
- 2021–22: – Penygraig United (promoted to SWAL via playoffs)
- 2022–23: – Ferndale BGC
- 2023–24: – Treorchy BGC (promoted to SW Premier League)
- 2024–25: – Porth Harlequins (promoted to SW Premier League)
- 2025–26: – Tonypandy Albion
