= Trelewis Welfare F.C. =

Association football club in Wales

Trelewis Welfare Association Football Club
- Founded: 1966 (reformed 2020)
- Ground: Trelewis Welfare Ground
- League: South Wales Premier League Division One East
- 2025–26: Merthyr & District League, 1st of 11 (promoted)

Trelewis Welfare A.F.C. are a Welsh football club from the village of Trelewis, Merthyr Tydfil in Wales. They played in the Welsh Football League for 27 seasons. The club folded in 2014. In 2020 the club reformed and entered the Merthyr & District League.

== Honours ==
- Welsh Football League Division Two (Third Tier) – Champions: 1980–81
- Welsh Football League Division Two (Third Tier) – Runners-Up: 1987–88
- Welsh Football League Cup – Runners-Up: 1981–82
- South Wales Amateur League Division Two – Runners-Up: 2011–12
- Merthyr & District League Premier Division – Champions: 2025–26
- Rhymney Valley League – Champions: 1967–68
- Rhymney Valley Senior Cup – Winners: 1966–67
- J.V Bevan cup- Winners: 2024/2025

== Welsh Football League history ==
Information sourced from the Football Club History Database and the Welsh Soccer Archive.

Season	Pyramid Tier	League	Final position
1970–71	3	Welsh Football League Division Two	10th
1971–72	3	Welsh Football League Division Two	14th
1972–73	3	Welsh Football League Division Two	11th
1973–74	3	Welsh Football League Division Two	16th
1974–75	3	Welsh Football League Division Two	15th
1975–76	3	Welsh Football League Division Two	18th
1976–77	3	Welsh Football League Division Two	8th
1977–78	3	Welsh Football League Division Two	14th
1978–79	3	Welsh Football League Division Two	9th
1979–80	3	Welsh Football League Division Two	11th
1980–81	3	Welsh Football League Division Two	1st – Champions (promoted)
1981–82	2	Welsh Football League Division One	12th
1982–83	2	Welsh Football League Division One	16th
1983–84 (Note: In this season The Premier Division (The Top Tier Division) was renamed 'National Division'. The 2nd tier division was renamed 'Premier Division' with the 3rd tier division named 'Division 1'.)	3	Welsh Football League Division One	16th
1984–85	3	Welsh Football League Division One	13th
1985–86	3	Welsh Football League Division One	16th
1986–87	3	Welsh Football League Division One	12th
1987–88	3	Welsh Football League Division One	2nd – Runners-Up (promoted)
1988–89	2	Welsh Football League Premier Division	15th
1989–90	2	Welsh Football League Premier Division	16th (relegated)
1990–91 (Note: In this season, The 2nd tier division was renamed 'Division One' with the 3rd tier division renamed 'Division Two'.)	3	Welsh Football League Division Two	16th
1991–92	3	Welsh Football League Division Two	17th (relegated)
1992–93 (Note: In this season the League of Wales was created as the new national tier 1 league. The Welsh Football League covered South Wales and now exists at tier 2 (Division One); tier 3 (Division Two) and tier 4 (Division Three).)	4	Welsh Football League Division Three	14th
1993–94	4	Welsh Football League Division Three	14th
1994–95	4	Welsh Football League Division Three	15th
1995–96	4	Welsh Football League Division Three	14th
1996–97	4	Welsh Football League Division Three	16th
