= Caerphilly Athletic F.C. =

Football club based in Caerphilly

Caerphilly Athletic
- Full name: Caerphilly Athletic Football Club
- Nicknames: The A’s, CAFC
- Founded: 2007 as Dynamo Aber
- Ground: Centre of Sporting Excellence, Ystrad Mynach
- Chairman: Chris Parry
- Manager: Ian Butterworth
- League: Cymru South
- 2025–26: Ardal SE League, 1st of 16 (promoted)
Home colours	Away colours

Caerphilly Athletic Football Club is a Welsh football club based in Caerphilly. The team currently plays in the Cymru South.

The club have competed in the Welsh Cup, reaching the second round in 2017–18, where they lost to Penrhyncoch.

Dynamo Aber F.C. was founded in 2007, initially playing in Sunday league and local five-a-side competitions. They then played in the Taff Ely & Rhymney Valley Alliance League, and after winning the league in 2013–14 they were promoted to the South Wales Amateur League. In 2015 it became the South Wales Alliance League and in 2016 they were promoted to Division One. In 2017 they renamed to Caerphilly Athletic.

In 2025, the club was promoted to the Ardal South East (tier 3) as runners-up of the South Wales Alliance Premier League. They were champions in their first season and gained promotion to the Cymru South.

== Honours ==
- Ardal South East – Champions: 2025–26
- South Wales Alliance League Premier – Runners–up: 2024–25
- South Wales Alliance League Division One – Champions: 2022–23
- Taff Ely & Rhymney Valley Alliance League Premier Division – Champions: 2013–14
- Ardal South Cup – Runners-up: 2025–26
