= Royal Welsh Warehouse F.C. =

Football club based in Newtown, Powys

Royal Welsh Warehouse
- Full name: Royal Welsh Warehouse Football Club
- Nickname: the Wanderers
- Short name: RWW
- Founded: 1880
- Dissolved: 1914

Royal Welsh Warehouse F.C. (often abbreviated to RWW) was a Welsh football club based in Newtown, Powys.

== History ==
The club was formed in 1880, but first appears in the 1888–89 Welsh Cup, where they went out in the first round, losing 1–0 to Oswestry.

In 1895 they were founder members of the Newtown & District Junior League, and in 1896–97 they were champions.

They were founder members of the Montgomeryshire League in 1904.

In 1906–07, 1907–08, and 1913–14 the club won the Montgomeryshire Challenge Cup.

The club does not appear to have reformed after World War One.

== Rivals ==
The club's main rivals were Newtown North End, another football club that emerged at a similar time in Newtown. They were originally known as Cambrian North End and rebranded in 1895, but folded in 1909.
