= Pontlottyn Blast Furnace F.C. =

Former association football club in Wales

Ponlottyn Blast Furnace Association Football Club
- Dissolved: 2003
- Ground: Pontlottyn Welfare Ground

Pontlottyn Association Football Club
- Founded: 2008
- Dissolved: 2019
- Ground: Pontlottyn Welfare Ground

Pontlottyn Blast Furnace A.F.C. were a Welsh football club from the village of Pontlottyn, in the county borough of Caerphilly, Wales. They played in the Welsh Football League for 34 seasons. The club folded in 2003 before reforming in 2008 as Pontlottyn A.F.C.

== History ==
=== Pontlottyn Town ===
The first Pontlottyn team was formed in September 1882. The Association football club was formed in 1898 with the first season of the club seeing them playing 24 matches with 15 matches won, 5 lost and 4 drawn. A club called Pontlottyn Town A.F.C. won the Second Division of the Glamorgan League in 1909–10.

=== Pontlottyn ===
A club called Pontlottyn F.C. appeared in the Welsh Football League in the 1920s.

=== Pontlottyn Blast Furnace ===
The club joined the Welsh Football League for the 1969–70 season and remained a league member for 34 seasons before withdrawing from the league after the end of the 2002–03 season citing lack of players.

=== Pontlottyn AFC ===
Another club, Pontlottyn AFC was formed in 2008 using the same ground. The team joined the Taff Ely and Rhymney Valley League, before gaining promotion to the South Wales Senior League where they moved up the top division after finishing runners-up in Division Two at the end of the 2012–13 season. In the final season of that division in 2014–15, the club were Division One champions. They came within a game of a return to the Welsh Football League, losing the play-off final to STM Sports at the Cardiff City Stadium in 2015. The club subsequently played in the new merged South Wales Alliance League, but were relegated from the Premier Division. The club again folded in the summer of 2019.

== Honours ==
=== Pontlottyn Blast Furnace ===
- Welsh Football League Division One (Third Tier of Pyramid) – Champions: 1983–84
- Welsh Football League Division One (Second Tier of Pyramid) – Runners-Up: 1976–77

=== Pontlottyn AFC ===
- South Wales Senior League Division One – Champions: 2014–15
- South Wales Senior League Division Two – Runners-Up: 2012–13
- Taff Ely & Rhymney Valley Alliance League Premier Division – Champions: 2010–11, 2011–12

=== Pontlottyn Town ===
- Glamorgan League Second Division – Champions: 1909–10

== Welsh Football League history ==
Information sourced from the Football Club History Database and the Welsh Soccer Archive.

Season	Pyramid Tier	League	Final position
1925–26 (Note: As Pontlottyn FC)	2	Welsh Football League Division Two Section A	2nd – Runners-Up
1926–27 (Note: As Pontlottyn FC)	2	Welsh Football League Division Two Section A	4th
1928–29 (Note: As Pontlottyn FC)	2	Welsh Football League Division Two	11th
1969–70	3	Welsh Football League Division Two (Note: From the 1964–65 season Division 1 was renamed 'Premier Division', Division 2 East and West were replaced by 'Division One' and 'Division Two' (effectively Division Two and Division Three).)	4th
1970–71	3	Welsh Football League Division Two	4th
1971–72	3	Welsh Football League Division Two	6th
1972–73	3	Welsh Football League Division Two	5th
1973–74	3	Welsh Football League Division Two	5th
1974–75	3	Welsh Football League Division Two	3rd (promoted)
1975–76	2	Welsh Football League Division One	5th
1976–77	2	Welsh Football League Division One	2nd – Runners-Up (promoted)
1977–78	1	Welsh Football League Premier Division	8th
1978–79	1	Welsh Football League Premier Division	15th
1979–80	1	Welsh Football League Premier Division	13th
1980–81	1	Welsh Football League Premier Division	11th
1981–82	1	Welsh Football League Premier Division	18th (relegated)
1982–83	2	Welsh Football League Division One	13th (transferred) (Note: At the end of this season the club was transferred to Division One as part of the league's re-organisation.)
1983–84 (Note: In this season The Premier Division (The Top Tier Division) was renamed 'National Division'. The 2nd tier division was renamed 'Premier Division' with the 3rd tier division named 'Division 1'.)	3	Welsh Football League Division One	1st – Champions (promoted)
1984–85	2	Welsh Football League Premier Division	6th
1985–86	2	Welsh Football League Premier Division	5th
1986–87	2	Welsh Football League Premier Division	15th
1987–88	2	Welsh Football League Premier Division	16th (relegated)
1988–89	3	Welsh Football League Division One	10th
1989–90	3	Welsh Football League Division One	10th
1990–91 (Note: In this season, The 2nd tier division was renamed 'Division One' with the 3rd tier division renamed 'Division Two'.)	3	Welsh Football League Division Two	17th
1991–92	3	Welsh Football League Division Two	10th
1992–93 (Note: In this season the League of Wales was created as the new national tier 1 league. The Welsh Football League covered South Wales and now exists at tier 2 (Division One); tier 3 (Division Two) and tier 4 (Division Three).)	4	Welsh Football League Division Three	9th
1993–94	4	Welsh Football League Division Three	6th
1994–95	4	Welsh Football League Division Three	6th
1995–96	4	Welsh Football League Division Three	9th
1996–97	4	Welsh Football League Division Three	9th
1997–98	4	Welsh Football League Division Three	11th
1998–99	4	Welsh Football League Division Three	9th
1999–2000	4	Welsh Football League Division Three	15th
2000–01	4	Welsh Football League Division Three	7th
2001–02	4	Welsh Football League Division Three	14th
2002–03	4	Welsh Football League Division Three	8th
