= Bettws F.C. =

Association football club in Wales

Bettws FC
- Full name: Bettws Football Club
- Founded: 1995
- Ground: North Site, Bettws
- Capacity: 1,500
- Chairman: Gavin Salter
- Manager: Gareth Darks
- League: South Wales Premier League Division One West
- 2025–26: South Wales Premier League Championship Division, 12th of 12 (relegated)
Home colours	Away colours

Bettws F.C. is a football club based in Bettws, near Bridgend, Wales. The team play in the South Wales Premier League Division One West. They have previously played in the Welsh Football League. Their ground, North Site, is located in the north-east of the village, east of Heol Glannant and north of Heol Richard Price. At the end of the 2019–20 season they were promoted to the South Wales Alliance League Division Two pending passing the ground inspection criteria.

== History ==
Bettws FC was formed in 1995 from the amalgamation of Bettws AFC and Bettws Athletic. Bettws AFC was formed in 1957 as Bettws Welfare and played in the Llynfi Valley, Bridgend & District League and up until 1995 the Port Talbot & District League. Bettws Athletic was formed in 1981 as Bettws Boys` Club and played in the Bridgend and District League before becoming one of the founder members of the South Wales Senior League which was formed in 1990 as part of the new pyramid system formulated by the FAW.

== History Timeline ==
- 1957: formation of Bettws Welfare by President Stan Epton. Played in the Llynfi Valley, Bridgend & District and Port Talbot & District Leagues. Bettws Welfare then became Bettws AFC.
- 1981: Bettws Boys Club was formed. Played in Bridgend & District League before becoming Bettws Athletic, one of the founder members of the South Wales Senior League in 1990 as part of the new pyramid system formulated by the FAW.
- 1995: Bettws FC (established from an amalgamation of Bettws AFC and Bettws Athletic) was formed in 1995, sponsored by Bettws Social Club. The target was Welsh League 2000, a 5-year plan.
- 1998–99 – Runners up in the Senior League once again.
- 1999–2000 – Senior League winners, South Wales Intermediate Cup winners but lost the play off for a place in the Welsh League to Dinas Powys.
- 2000–01 – After a successful appeal, Bettws won the 3rd Division title at the first attempt.
- 2001–02 – Followed on with a 2nd place promotion from Division 2, behind Garden Village.
- 2002–03 – Bettws went into the 1st Division hoping to consolidate at mid table but achieved much more. Runners up to Neath in the League Cup. Welsh League winners. However, this magnificent achievement came too early for Bettws to progress into the FAW Premier League due to inadequate facilities.
- 2005–06 – Unfortunately relegation became a reality on the final day of the season.
- 2007–08 – Greater success followed with promotion back to the first division – by six clear points before relegation loomed again in the 2009–10 season.
- 2010–11 – Once again personnel changes bring some instability to the club but a mid-table finish in division 2 was achieved.
- 2011–12 – A poor season by Bettws standards, resulting in relegation to Division 3 for the first team. The reserve team, however, were runners up in the cup.
- 2012–13 – A young team remained in the Welsh League, only due to a late restructure of the 3rd division to include 19 (rather than the usual 16) teams.
- 2013–14 – A mid table finish ensured the team would play Welsh League football again next season.

== Honours ==
- Welsh Football League Division One – Champions: 2002–03
- Welsh Football League Division Two – Champions: 2007–08
- Welsh Football League Division Three – Champions: 2000–01
- South Wales Senior League – Champions: 1999–2000
- South Wales Intermediate Cup – Winners: 1999–2000
- Bridgend & District League Premier Division – Champions: 2019-20 1985-86 1990-91 1996–97
- Bridgend & District League First Division – Champions: 1995–96
- Bridgend & District League First Division – Runners-up: 1983–84
