= Tondu Robins A.F.C. =

Association football club in Wales

Tondu Robins
- Full name: Tondu Robins Association Football Club
- Nickname: The Robins
- Founded: 1898
- Ground: Pandy Park
- Chairman: Gavin Jenkins
- Manager: Jim Betts
- League: Bridgend & District Premier Division
- 2025–26: Bridgend & District Premier Division, 9th of 9
Home colours	Away colours

Tondu Robins A.F.C. is a Welsh football club from the village of Tondu in Bridgend County Borough, South Wales. The club played for 29 seasons in the Welsh Football League including three seasons in the second tier of Welsh club football. They play in the Bridgend & District Premier Division.

== History ==
The club was founded in 1898.

== Welsh Football League history ==
Information in this section is sourced from the Football Club History Database for Tondu Robins (1966–67 to 1989–90 and 1993–94 to 1995–96 seasons) and AFC Tondu (1990–91 to 1992–93 seasons)

Season	Pyramid Tier	League	Final position
1967–68	3	Welsh Football League Division Two	8th
1968–69	3	Welsh Football League Division Two	9th
1969–70	3	Welsh Football League Division Two	12th
1970–71	3	Welsh Football League Division Two	9th
1971–72	3	Welsh Football League Division Two	17th
1972–73	3	Welsh Football League Division Two	15th
1973–74	3	Welsh Football League Division Two	9th
1974–75	3	Welsh Football League Division Two	6th
1975–76	3	Welsh Football League Division Two	6th
1976–77	3	Welsh Football League Division Two	4th
1977–78	3	Welsh Football League Division Two	7th
1978–79	3	Welsh Football League Division Two	11th
1979–80	3	Welsh Football League Division Two	8th
1980–81	3	Welsh Football League Division Two	10th
1981–82	3	Welsh Football League Division Two	4th
1982–83	3	Welsh Football League Division Two	1st – Champions (promoted)
1983–84 (Note: In this season The Premier Division (Division 1) was renamed 'National Division'. The 2nd tier division was renamed 'Premier Division' with the 3rd tier division named 'Division One'.)	2	Welsh Football League Premier Division	13th
1984–85	2	Welsh Football League Premier Division	13th
1985–86	2	Welsh Football League Premier Division	18th (relegated)
1986–87	3	Welsh Football League Division One	8th
1987–88	3	Welsh Football League Division One	12th
1988–89	3	Welsh Football League Division One	12th
1989–90	3	Welsh Football League Division One	15th
1990–91 (Note: In this season, The 2nd tier division was renamed 'Division One' with the 3rd tier division renamed 'Division Two'.)	3	Welsh Football League Division Two	8th
1991–92	3	Welsh Football League Division Two	15th
1992–93 (Note: In this season the League of Wales was created as the new national tier 1 league. The Welsh Football League covered South Wales and now exists at tier 2 (Division One); tier 3 (Division Two) and tier 4 (Division Three).)	4	Welsh Football League Division Three	11th
1993–94	4	Welsh Football League Division Three	5th
1994–95	4	Welsh Football League Division Three	8th
1995–96	4	Welsh Football League Division Three	15th

== Honours ==
- Welsh Football League Division Two (Tier 3 of the Welsh Pyramid) – Champions: 1982–83
- South Wales Amateur League Division One – Runners-Up: 2003–04
- South Wales Amateur League Division Two – Runners-Up: 2002–03
- Bridgend & District League Premier Division – Champions: 2001–02
- Bridgend & District League Premier Division – Runners-Up (3): 1998–99; 1999–2000; 2010–11
- Bridgend & District League Division One – Runners-Up: 2024–25
