= Trebanog F.C. =

Association football club in Wales

Trebanog
- Full name: Trebanog Football Club
- Founded: 2013
- Ground: Trebanog Field
- Manager: Rhys Hughes
- 2022–23: South Wales Alliance Premier, (club resigned)

Trebanog Football Club was a Welsh football team based in Porth, Wales. They played in the South Wales Alliance League First Division, which is in the fifth tier of the Welsh football league system.

== History ==
The club was established in 2013 by Dean Gill, Dean Lewis and Dylan Lewis, out of the reserves of AFC Porth, and initially played in the Rhondda & District League. They won the League once, the Lucania Cup twice, and the South Wales Intermediate Cup. They gained promotion to the South Wales Alliance League in the 2016–17 season, finishing as runners-up and gaining another promotion to Division One. In the 2017–18 season they finished third in Division One, gaining another promotion to the Premier Division.

In May 2023 the club confirmed that they had withdrawn from the senior Welsh football system, and would instead concentrate on supporting the club's junior sides.

== Honours ==
- South Wales Alliance League Division Two: Runners-up: 2016–17
- Rhondda & District League Premier Division: Runners-up 2013–14, 2014–15, Champions 2015–16
- Lucania Cup (Rhondda & District) Champions 2014–15, 2015–16
- South Wales Intermediate Cup Champions 2015–16
