= Maesteg Park A.F.C. =

Association football club in Wales

Maesteg Park
- Full name: Maesteg Park Athletic Football Club
- Nickname: The Park
- Founded: 1945
- Ground: Tudor Park
- League: Bridgend & District Premier Division
- 2025–26: Bridgend & District Premier Division, 6th of 9
Home colours	Away colours

Maesteg Park Athletic Football Club is a Welsh football club based in Maesteg, Wales. The club played in the Welsh Football League and the top flight League of Wales before being dissolved. The club reformed in 2010 and play in the Bridgend & District Premier Division, having won promotion from the Bridgend & District League via the South Wales Alliance League promotion play-offs in June 2019, and the Division Two title in the summer of 2020.

== History ==
Formed in 1945, as Maesteg Park Athletic, they spent nearly twenty years in local league football prior to joining Division Two West of the Welsh Football League in 1962–63. Within six years the club gained promotion and in 1969–70 moved to their present home at Tudor Park. The ground was built adjacent to the clubhouse which pre-dates Tudor Park by some seven years.

Following promotion in 1972–73, The Park spent two seasons in the top flight with moderate success, only to be relegated in 1975. They had plenty to celebrate in 1978–79 season when the Division One title was won along with the South Wales Senior Cup. The following season Maesteg were runners up to Newport County and reached the last eight of the Welsh Cup before bowing out to Swansea City.

Floodlights were erected at Tudor Park in 1982 and Cardiff City played the inaugural match under them. Thereafter, Maesteg Park enjoyed an unbroken spell in the Abacus League's top flight having been elected as founder members of the restructured National Division in 1983–84. They finished third that season and continued to perform satisfactorily in the 1980s, without ever bettering that position.

In 1989–90 Maesteg just managed to escape relegation, though they made up for this lapse by finishing fifth the following year. That was Phil Holmes' first year as the club manager and he saw his side triumph over Barry Town in the final of the South Wales Senior Cup, Maesteg winning a two-legged final with a 6–3 aggregate score. Within another two years The Park had another achievement to be proud of when reaching the semi-final of the Welsh Cup in 1992. On their way to reaching the late stage of the competition, Maesteg Park beat Trelewis Welfare 8–0 and Llanwern 4–2 before winning 5–2 at Cwmbran Town. In the fourth round they were drawn to play Football League side Hereford United at Edgar Street, yet came away with a 2–1 victory. A 2–0 quarter final success over Aberystwyth Town was rewarded with a semi final tie against Cardiff City.

Following a goalless draw at Ninian Park, Maesteg were ordered to return to Cardiff's home for the replay amidst much controversy. Police objections to the tie staged at Tudor Park left Maesteg Park with no choice but to comply. Despite holding the Football League side to 0–0 at half-time, strength and experience told in the end and Cardiff City ran out 4–0 winners.

Maesteg Park enjoyed the distinction of being one of just fourteen Welsh Clubs accepted into the F.A. Cup and F.A. Trophy for each of the eleven seasons prior to the formation of The League of Wales in 1992.

The team's initial season in The League of Wales saw the club finish in fifteenth position, gaining forty points from nine victories and thirteen draws. However, The Park finished last but one and only escaped relegation when Haverfordwest County had to resign from the League. Maesteg were forced to play their first seven games away from home in 1993, while ground and dressing room improvements were finished off at Tudor Park. They fared quite well during that period, but then won only three of their next 25 league games and a relegation battle was fought to the end.

The 1994–95 season brought little other than disappointment as the club slid quietly out of the League of Wales with hardly a murmur. They were tailed off for most of the season and finished 22 points adrift of Mold Alexandra the other relegated club. One of the fifty players to feature in the first team that season Mark Jones, took over the managerial reins for the following term as the club returned to the Welsh League, and stayed as manager of the club for six seasons.

Since then the Welsh League have witnessed Maesteg Park as a regular top half side. Twice in 1995–96 and 1999–2000, the club finished in third place and in 2000–01 they lost the Welsh League Championship on goal difference to Ton Pentre as well as reaching the semi-finals of the Welsh Cup for the second time in nine years.

With Andrew Rickard as Manager for the last two seasons The Park finished fourth and seventh respectively in the league. Dave Elliott subsequently took over the reins as Manager, but could not avoid the club resigning from the league at the end of the 2009–10 season.

The club reformed in the 2010, and played in the Bridgend & District League. In 2013–14 they were champions of the Tier 9 First Division. After finishing in the top 4 for the next three seasons in the Premier Division, they were runners-up in the 2017–18 season. before being crowned champions at the end of the 2018–19 season. After winning the league they entered the playoff for promotion to the South Wales Alliance League and won 4–0 against Ynysybwl to secure promotion.

In May 2020 they secured the South Wales Alliance League Division Two title, on points per game average after the season was curtailed as a result of the Coronavirus pandemic.

== Honours ==
=== Maesteg Park ===
- South Wales Alliance League Division Two — Champions: 2019–20
- South Wales Alliance League Promotion Play-Offs — Winners: 2018–19
- Bridgend & District League Premier League — Champions: 2018–19
- Bridgend & District League Premier League — Runners-Up: 2017–18
- Bridgend & District League First League — Champions: 2013–14
- South Wales Senior Cup – Winners: 1990–91

=== Maesteg Park Athletic ===
- Welsh Football League Premier League Division — Runners-Up: 1979–80
- Welsh Football League First Division — Champions: 1978–79
- Welsh Football League First Division — Runners-Up: 1972–73
- Welsh Football League First Division — Runners-Up: 2000–01
- Welsh Football League Second Division — Runners-Up: 1968–69
- South Wales Senior Cup – Winners: 1978–79
