= South Wales Senior League =

- Founded: 1991
- Folded: 2015
- Country: Wales
- Divisions: 2
- Number of clubs: 32 (16 in each division)
- Level on pyramid: 5 and 6
- Promotion to: Welsh Football League Division Three
- Domestic cup: CW Bruty League Challenge Cup
- Last champions: Pontlottyn (Division 1); Cadoxton Barry (Division 2) (2014-15)
- Most championships: Bridgend Street; Caerau (Ely); Sully Sports (4 titles)

The South Wales Senior League is a former football league in South Wales. The league consisted of two divisions, named Divisions One and Two. Division One was a feeder to the Welsh Football League Division Three, and therefore sat at levels 5 of the Welsh football pyramid.

The league was dominated by clubs from Cardiff with no fewer than 14 titles going to the city. Bridgend Street won it four times and their success in 2011 saw them move up into the Welsh Football League for the first time.

The league was merged with South Wales Amateur League in 2015–16 season to form South Wales Alliance League.

== Member Clubs in the final 2014-15 season ==
=== Division 1 ===
- AFC Butetown
- Brecon Corries
- Cornelly United
- Cwmaman Institute
- Cwmbach Royal Stars
- Fochriw
- Grange Albion
- Max United (withdrew mid-season)
- Penydarren BGC
- Pontlottyn
- Porthcawl Town
- Sporting Marvels
- Sully Sports
- Tonyrefail BGC

=== Division 2 ===
- AFC Whitchurch
- Cadoxton Barry
- Cefn Cribwr
- Cogan Coronation
- Garw SBGC
- Llanrumney United
- Margam Youth Centre
- Penrhiwceiber Cons Athletic
- Penrhiwfer
- St Albans
- St Josephs
- Stanleytown
- Tongwynlais
- Ynyshir Albions

== Divisional Champions ==
Season	Division One	Division Two
1991-92	Les Croupiers Caerau (Ely)	No competition
1992-93	Grange Quins	No competition
1993-94	Lisvane Heath Hornets	No competition
1994-95	Les Croupiers Caerau (Ely)	Penydarren BC
1995-96	Lisvane FC	Llangynwyd Rangers
1996-97	Les Croupiers Caerau (Ely)	Butetown
1997-98	Caerau (Ely)	Wenvoe Park
1998-99	AFC Llwydcoed	Ynyshir Albions
1999-00	Bettws	Penrhiwceiber Cons
2000-01	Pentwyn Dynamos	AFC Whitchurch
2001-02	Bridgend Street	Fairwater
2002-03	Ynyshir Albions	Penrhiwfer
2003-04	Penrhiwfer	Cwm Welfare
2004-05	Bridgend Street	Nelson Cavaliers
2005-06	Sully Sports	Cwmbach Royal Stars
2006-07	Sully Sports	St Athan
2007-08	Fairwater	Ynyshir Albions
2008-09	Fairwater	St Athan
2009-10	Bridgend Street	Cadoxton Barry
2010-11	Bridgend Street	Lisvane/Llanishen
2011-12	Sully Sports	Fochriw
2012-13	Sully Sports	Cornelly United
2013-14	Cwm Welfare	Max United
2014-15	Pontlottyn	Cadoxton Barry

=== Division One Champions - by number of titles ===
- Bridgend Street – 4 titles
- Caerau (Ely) – 4 titles
- Sully Sports – 4 titles
- Fairwater – 2 titles
- Grange Quins – 1 title
- AFC Llwydcoed – 1 title
- Bettws – 1 title
- Cwm Welfare – 1 title
- Lisvane – 1 title
- Lisvane Heath Hornets – 1 title
- Penrhiwfer – 1 title
- Pentwyn Dynamos – 1 title
- Pontlottyn – 1 title
- Ynyshir Albions – 1 title
