= Llanymynech F.C. =

Football club based in Shropshire

Llanymynech
- Full name: Llanymynech Football Club
- Nickname: Llany
- Founded: 2011
- Ground: Station Road
- League: Shropshire County League Premier Division
- 2025–26: Shropshire County League Premier Division, 14th of 15
Home colours

Llanymynech F.C. is a football club based in Llanymynech, a village on the England–Wales border, between Powys and Shropshire. The team currently plays in the Shropshire County Football League Premier Division, a tier of the English football league system.

== History ==
A football club was formed in the village as far back as May 1858 in a field near Glanverniew House on the English side of the border. There is no further mention of a football club in the village until November 1879 when a club was formed following a meeting at the school room.

The football club in Llanymynech existed in 1858, and would be the oldest football club in Wales if a continual link could be proven to the current incarnation. However the club has been reformed numerous times since, and the 1858 club was formed on the English side of the border.

The club was reformed in 2011, joining the Montgomeryshire Football League.

Llanymynech competed in the 2021–22 Welsh Cup, losing 6–0 at home to Caersws in the second qualifying round, having won 3–0 away against Montgomery Town in the previous round. However this came during a time of struggle for the team, and in February 2025 they ended a run of 735 days without a league win.

In 2022, the club moved from the Welsh league system to the English league system, joining the Shropshire County Football League Division One.
