= Garw S.B.G.C. =

Association football club in Wales

- Full name: Garw Seniors, Boys and Girls Club
- Founded: 1945
- Ground: Blandy Park
- Capacity: 300
- Chairman: Kevin Day
- Manager: Dylan Powell
- League: Bridgend & District League Division Two
- 2024–25: South Wales Premier League Division One West, 9th of 11
| Home colours | Away colours |

Garw S.B.G.C. (Garw Seniors, Boys and Girls Club) is a football club based in the village of Pontycymer, near Bridgend, Wales who play in Bridgend & District League Division Two.

== History ==
The club was formed in 1945 as Garw Athletic. They joined the Welsh Football League in 1952 and played in the league continuously until the end of 2009–10 when they were relegated out of the league. The club were champions of Welsh Football League Division Two in 2000–01 and 2006–07. The club changed its name to Garw S.B.G.C in 2008–09. The club then played in the South Wales Senior League, before joining the South Wales Alliance League where they were Division Two champions in 2016–17 and runners-up in Division One in 2017–18. The team folded after the 2024–25 season, and returned for the 2026–27 season.

== Welsh Football League history ==
Information in this section is sourced from the Football Club History Database and the Welsh Soccer Archive.

| Season | Pyramid Tier | League | Final position |
|---|---|---|---|
| 1953–54 | 2 | Welsh Football League Division Two West | 12th |
| 1954–55 | 2 | Welsh Football League Division Two West | 9th |
| 1955–56 | 2 | Welsh Football League Division Two West | 11th |
| 1956–57 | 2 | Welsh Football League Division Two West | 7th |
| 1957–58 | 2 | Welsh Football League Division Two West | 13th |
| 1958–59 | 2 | Welsh Football League Division Two West | 16th |
| 1959–60 | 2 | Welsh Football League Division Two West | 13th |
| 1960–61 | 2 | Welsh Football League Division Two West | 16th |
| 1961–62 | 2 | Welsh Football League Division Two West | 16th |
| 1962–63 | 2 | Welsh Football League Division Two West | 11th |
| 1963–64 | 2 | Welsh Football League Division Two West | 12th |
| 1964–65 (Note: In this season Division 1 was renamed 'Premier Division', Division 2 East and West were replaced by 'Division 1' and 'Division 2' (effectively Division 2 and Division 3) Garw Athletic placed in Division 2, the 3rd tier division.) | 3 | Welsh Football League Division Two | 9th |
| 1965–66 | 3 | Welsh Football League Division Two | 10th |
| 1966–67 | 3 | Welsh Football League Division Two | 11th |
| 1967–68 | 3 | Welsh Football League Division Two | 11th |
| 1968–69 | 3 | Welsh Football League Division Two | 17th |
| 1969–70 | 3 | Welsh Football League Division Two | 14th |
| 1970–71 | 3 | Welsh Football League Division Two | 14th |
| 1971–72 | 3 | Welsh Football League Division Two | 11th |
| 1972–73 | 3 | Welsh Football League Division Two | 14th |
| 1973–74 | 3 | Welsh Football League Division Two | 14th |
| 1974–75 | 3 | Welsh Football League Division Two | 5th |
| 1975–76 | 3 | Welsh Football League Division Two | 9th |
| 1976–77 | 3 | Welsh Football League Division Two | 2nd - Runners-Up (promoted) |
| 1977–78 | 2 | Welsh Football League Division One | 13th |
| 1978–79 | 2 | Welsh Football League Division One | 16th (relegated) |
| 1979–80 | 3 | Welsh Football League Division Two | 9th |
| 1980–81 | 3 | Welsh Football League Division Two | 8th |
| 1981–82 | 3 | Welsh Football League Division Two | 10th |
| 1982–83 | 3 | Welsh Football League Division Two | 3rd (promoted) |
| 1983–84 (Note: In this season The Premier Division (Division 1) was renamed 'National Division'. The 2nd tier division was renamed 'Premier Division' with the 3rd tier division named 'Division 1'.) | 2 | Welsh Football League Premier Division | 19th (relegated) |
| 1984–85 | 3 | Welsh Football League Division One | 4th |
| 1985–86 | 3 | Welsh Football League Division One | 10th |
| 1986–87 | 3 | Welsh Football League Division One | 11th |
| 1987–88 | 3 | Welsh Football League Division One | 10th |
| 1988–89 | 3 | Welsh Football League Division One | 1st - Champions (promoted) |
| 1989–90 | 2 | Welsh Football League Premier Division | 12th |
| 1990–91 (Note: In this season, The 2nd tier division was renamed 'Division 1' with the 3rd tier division renamed 'Division 2'.) | 2 | Welsh Football League Division One | 10th |
| 1991–92 | 2 | Welsh Football League Division One | 17th (relegated) |
| 1992–93 (Note: In this season the League of Wales was created as the new national tier 1 league. The Welsh Football League covered South Wales and now exists at tier 2 (Division 1); tier 3 (Division Two) and tier 3 (Division Three).) | 3 | Welsh Football League Division Two | 10th |
| 1993–94 | 3 | Welsh Football League Division Two | 7th |
| 1994–95 | 3 | Welsh Football League Division Two | 7th |
| 1995–96 | 3 | Welsh Football League Division Two | 15th |
| 1996–97 | 4 | Welsh Football League Division Three | 7th |
| 1997–98 | 4 | Welsh Football League Division Three | 10th |
| 1998–99 | 4 | Welsh Football League Division Three | 4th |
| 1999–2000 | 4 | Welsh Football League Division Three | 1st - Champions (promoted) |
| 2000–01 | 3 | Welsh Football League Division Two | 1st - Champions (promoted) |
| 2001–02 | 2 | Welsh Football League Division One | 4th |
| 2002–03 | 2 | Welsh Football League Division One | 6th |
| 2003–04 | 2 | Welsh Football League Division One | 11th |
| 2004–05 | 2 | Welsh Football League Division One | 18th (relegated) |
| 2005–06 | 3 | Welsh Football League Division Two | 3rd |
| 2006–07 | 3 | Welsh Football League Division Two | 1st - Champions (promoted) |
| 2007–08 | 2 | Welsh Football League Division One | 18th (relegated) |
| 2008–09 (Note: Club renamed Garw S.B.G.C. for this season onwards) | 3 | Welsh Football League Division Two | 17th (relegated) |
| 2009–10 | 4 | Welsh Football League Division Three | 18th (relegated) |

== Honours ==
- Welsh Football League Division Two (Tier 3 Welsh Football Pyramid) - Champions: 2000–01; 2006–07
- Welsh Football League Division One (Tier 3 Welsh Football League) - Champions: 1988–89
- Welsh Football League Division Two (Tier 3 Welsh Football League) - Runners-Up: 1976–77
- Welsh Football League Division Three (Tier 4 Welsh Football Pyramid) - Champions: 1999–2000
- South Wales Alliance League Division One - Runners-Up: 2017–18
- South Wales Alliance League Division Two - Champions: 2016–17
