= Cefn Cribwr F.C. =

Association football club in Wales

Cefn Cribwr Football Club
- Full name: Cefn Cribwr Football Club
- Nickname: The Riders
- Founded: 1976; 50 years ago as Cefn Cribwr Boys Club
- Ground: Cae Gof; Cefn Cribwr
- Capacity: 250 (106 seated)
- Coordinates: 51°31′48.7884″N 3°38′42.0792″W
- Chairman: John Griffiths
- Manager: Scott Dryden
- League: Ardal SW League
- 2025–26: Ardal SW League, 8th of 16
- Website: cefncribwrfc.com
Home colours	Away colours

Cefn Cribwr Football Club (Welsh: Clwb Pêl-droed Cefn Cribwr) is a Welsh football team based in Cefn Cribwr, Bridgend County Borough, Wales. They play in the Ardal SW League.

== History ==
Established in 1976 as Cefn Cribwr Boys Club by Gary Davies, the club entered senior football in 1979, with their first match being a 4–4 draw against Pencoed Athletic. They played in the Bridgend & District League and were back-to-back Premier Division champions in the 1986–87 and 1987–88 seasons.

They were founder members of the South Wales Senior League in the 1991–92 season, playing in the league until 2000. They again played in the Bridgend & District League, winning the Premier Division in 2013–14, and gaining promotion to South Wales Senior League for its final season in 2014–15. In the season 2013-14, Adam James became the all time record goalscorer for one season with a total of 72 goals.They joined the newly established South Wales Alliance League Division Two in 2015–16, and after finishing third in the 2016–17 season, were promoted to Division One, where they finished their first season in the division as champions, gaining promotion to the Premier Division.

Following the formation of a limited company in July 2021, the club's name was changed to Cefn Cribwr Football Club, to reflect "a club that was open to all". After successfully applying for a Tier 3 licence, the club's promotion to the third tier of Welsh football was confirmed on 14 May 2022, after a 4–2 victory over Blaenrhondda saw the club finish as runners-up in the South Wales Alliance League Premier Division. As a result of Cae Gof being deemed unsuitable for the Ardal Leagues, the club's first team played at Cambrian & Clydach Vale for the 2022–23 and 2023–24 seasons, whilst improvements to the ground were made. A successful crowdfunding campaign concluded in July 2022, raising the amount necessary to help the first team return to Cefn Cribwr. The first team returned to Cae Gof in time for the 2024–2025 campaign.

After joining Cefn Cribwr in 1993, Scott Dryden (who became first team manager during the 2014–15 season) announced his departure after the team won the Ardal Southern League Cup. Dylan Powell, who was the assistant manager to Dryden in the 2022–23 season, was announced as the new first team manager on 12 June 2023. On 2 October 2023, Dylan Powell resigned as manager. Scott Dryden's return to the club was announced on 13 October 2023.

== Honours ==
=== League ===
- Ardal South West
  - Runners-up: 2023–24
- South Wales Alliance League Premier Division
  - Runners-up: 2021–22
- South Wales Alliance League Division One
  - Winners: 2017–18
- South Wales Alliance League Division Two
  - Runners-up: 2016–17
- Bridgend & District League Premier Division
  - Winners: 1983–84; 1986–87; 1987–88; 2013–14

=== Cup ===
- Ardal Southern League Cup
  - Winners: 2022–23
  - Runners-up: 2023–24
- W.T. John Open Cup
  - Winners: 1990–91; 2000–01; 2005–06; 2007–08; 2008–09; 2013–14
