= Llanrumney United F.C. =

Association football club in Wales

Llanrumney United
- Full name: Llanrumney United Football Club
- Founded: 1996
- Ground: The Jamie Burley Stadium
- Chairman: Gareth Morgan
- Manager: Ian Summers
- League: South Wales Premier League Division One East
- 2025–26: South Wales Premier League Division One East, 9th of 12

Llanrumney United Football Club is a Welsh football team based in Llanrumney, Cardiff, Wales. They play in the South Wales Premier League Division One East.

== History ==
The club was founded on 16 August 1996, and joined the South Wales Senior League Division Two, where they finished runners-up in their first season, and gained promotion to Division One.

In 2018–19 they were champions of Division Two of the South Wales Alliance League and gained promotion to Division One.

In the 2019–20 season they finished as runners-up and were promoted to the Premier Division for the 2020–21 season.

The club formed a women's team in 2024 and they were promoted to the Adran South (tier 2) after winning the SWWGL Combined title in 2026.

== Honours ==
- South Wales Alliance League Division One: – Runners-up: 2019–20
- South Wales Alliance League Division Two – Winners: 2018–19
- South Wales Senior League Cup – Champions: 2008–09
- South Wales Senior League Division Two: – Runners-up: 1996–97; 2005–06
