= Bridgend Street A.F.C. =

Association football club in Wales

Bridgend Street
- Full name: Bridgend Street Association Football Club
- Nicknames: Street, The Mission
- Founded: 1899
- Ground: The Willows
- Capacity: 1,750
- Chairman: Wayne Tarr
- Manager: Craig Dale
- League: South Wales Premier League Premier Division
- 2024–25: Ardal SW League, 15th of 16 (relegated)
Home colours	Away colours

Bridgend Street are a Welsh football club based in Cardiff. The club currently play in the South Wales Premier League Premier Division. The club emanate from the Splott district of the capital and have been established since 1899.

== History ==
Bridgend Street won multiple trophies under the management of Laurence "Lollar" Marshall and Edward Crawley throughout the 1970s and 1980s. With the newly formed South Wales Senior League formed, the club then won their place in that league in 1993 and went on to be record five-time winners of the title until their promotion to The Welsh Football League.

The Senior League's CW Bruty Cup was won in 1997 after defeating Pentwyn Dynamos 2–1 in the final under the managership of Joe Feehan and a few seasons later, the first of the club's Senior League title was won under an ex-player Garry Fowler in the 2001–02 season whilst former players, Kingsley Lloyd, and Geraint Brooks led the club to two more South Wales FA Senior League titles in 2005 and 2006. This resulted in them receiving the accolade of South Wales FA Manager of The Year award. In 2007–08 the duo led the club to its then highest possible cup triumphe. The team lifted the South Wales Senior Cup, beating South Wales Amateur League champions Corus (Port Talbot) in the final by a 2–1 scoreline. In addition the team appeared in two consecutive CW Bruty Cup Finals in 2006 and 2007 losing both in a penalty shootout after the games were tied.

Promotion to the Welsh League came in 2010 after two back-to-back Senior League titles.

In the 2016–17 season Street reached the Welsh Football League Cup final, eliminating along the way Taffs Well (the holders of the cup for the past two seasons) and beating another Division One outfit Haverfordwest County 4–2 on penalties in the semi-final. Bridgend Street lost 3–1 to Llanelli Town in the Welsh League Cup Final at Old Road, Briton Ferry.

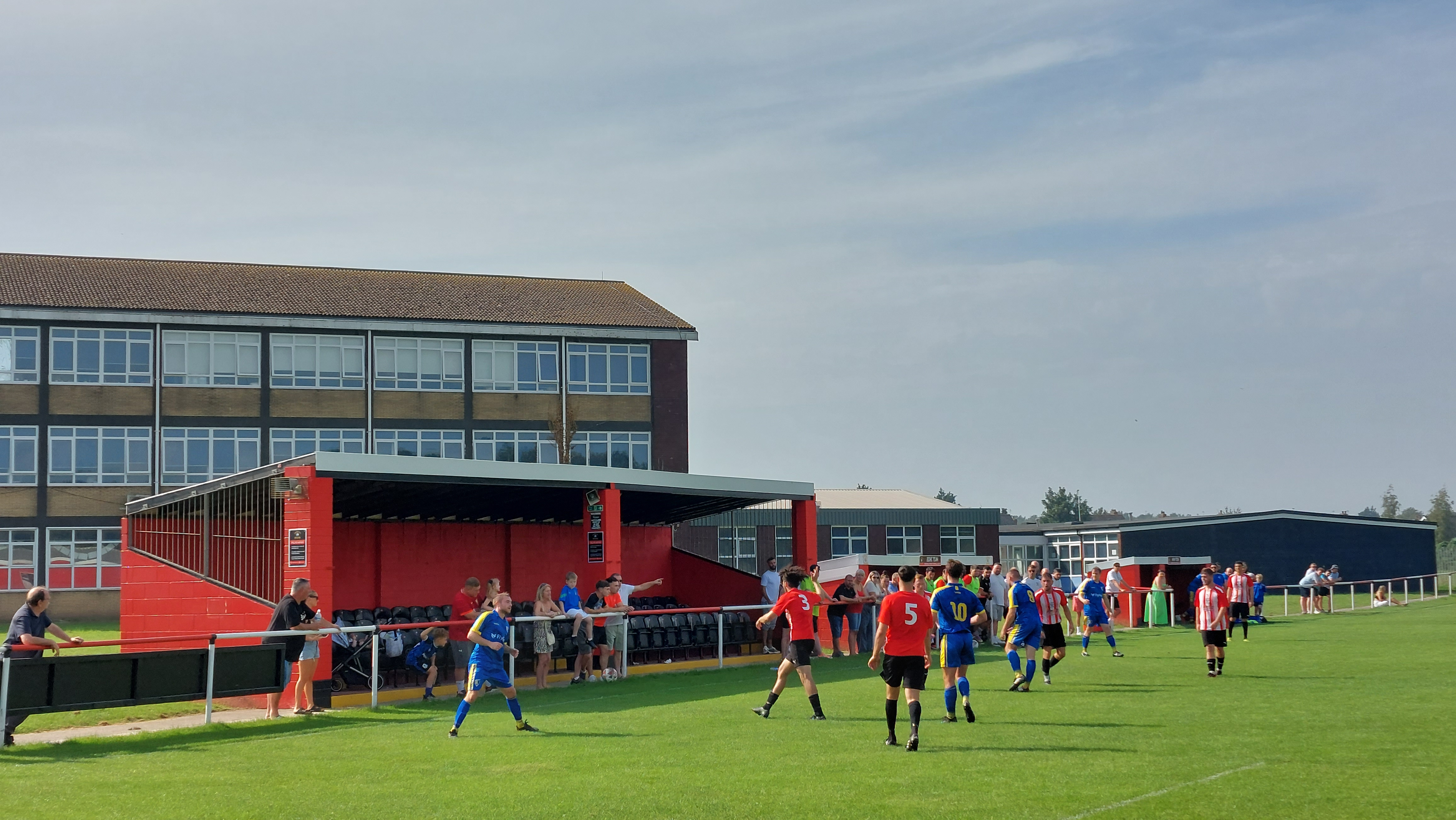
Bridgend Street's home ground, The Willows

The 2017–18 season saw Street gain its first promotion within the Welsh League when they finished as runners up in the third division. With only two clubs gaining promotion from the 16 team division it looked like Street would narrowly miss out again, however, an incredible run in winning all of the final twelve games of the season saw them pip Trefelin BGC by goal difference. After gaining this achievement manager Craig Dale stood down from his role due to work and family commitments at the end of the promotion season and was replaced by former Grange Albion manager John Jones for the 2018–19 campaign. In the summer of 2019 the club appointed former Cardiff City player and STM Sports FC coach Nathan Cadette as their new manager, replacing the outgoing Jones for the 2019–20 season. Cadette left the post in November 2020 and was replaced in January 2021 by former Newport County & Wales Non-League International defender Craig Lima. He will be assisted by former Sunderland player Sean Wharton whilst the club will again be captained by Paul Fowler with Jeffrey White the vice skipper for the 2021–22 campaign. The 2022–23 season saw the return of Craig Dale as manager in a joint role alongside Joey Rees, the club finished in third place and in doing so narrowly missed out on promotion back to the Welsh League. Rees and Dale continued their joint managership into the 2023/2024 season this time were successful in leading the club back to the Welsh League pyramid finishing as runners up in the South Wales Alliance League.

== Honours ==
- South Wales Senior League Division 1
  - Champions: 2001–02, 2004–05, 2009–10, 2010–11
  - Runners-up: 2005–06
- CW Bruty Cup Winners - 1997–98, Runners-up 2004–05, 2005–06
- Cardiff & District League Premier Division Champions - 1981–82, 1983–84, 1985–86, 1986–87, 1993–94
- Cardiff & District League First Division Champions (reserve team) - 1983–84, 1984–85, 1985–86, 1987–88, 2005–06
- Cardiff & District League Second Division Champions - 1981–82
- City Supporters Cup Winners - 1979–80, 1985–86, 1986–87, 1988–89, 1989–90, 1990–91, 1992–92, 1993–94
- Lord Ninian Stuart Cup Winners - 1981–82, 2005–06
- Cardiff & District Leonard Cup Winners 1978–79 (third XI)
- Greyhound Cup Winners - 1985–86 (second XI)
- South Wales Intermediate Cup Winners - 1983–84, 1991–92.
- South Wales FA Senior Cup Winners - 2007–08
- Welsh League Reserve Division champions - 2011–12
- Welsh League Cup Runners-up - 2016–17
- Welsh League Third Division Runners-up 2017–18
