= Pencoed Athletic BGC =

Association football club in Wales

- Full name: Pencoed Athletic Boys and Girls Club Association Football Club
- Ground: Woodlands Park
- Chairman: Lyn Williams
- Manager: Mark Powell
- League: South Wales Premier League Premier Division
- 2024–25: South Wales Premier League Premier Division, 7th of 12

Pencoed Athletic BGC is a Welsh football team based in Pencoed, Wales. They play South Wales Premier League Premier Division. They were champions of the league in 2020 and were eligible for promotion to the Ardal Leagues but were not granted tier 3 Football Association of Wales certification despite appealing the decision.

== History ==
Football was first played by a team from the village with neighbouring villages in 1890. In 1915 a team entered the Garw and Lynfi League, and in the 1930s had a period of success. After the Second World War, for the 1946–47 season, a team called Pencoed Athletics Sports Club entered the Bridgend & District League, winning the league's cup in 1948 and being crowned league champions in 1948–49. The team applied for, and gained entry to the South Wales Amateur League for the 1952–53 season and for all but a short period remained in that league, until the formation of the new South Wales Alliance League. The club's reserve team also continues to play in the Bridgend & District League.

== Honours ==
- South Wales Alliance League Premier Division – Champions: 2019–20
- South Wales Alliance League Premier Division – Runners-up: 2018–19
- South Wales Amateur League Division Two – Champions: 1981–82; 1992–93; 2013–14
- Bridgend & District League Division One – Champions: 1948–49
- Bridgend & District League Cup – Winners: 1948
