= Ynyshir Albions F.C. =

Association football club in Wales

Coordinates: 51°36′56.7″N 3°25′41.9″W

Ynyshir Albions
- Full name: Ynyshir Albions Football Club
- Nickname: The Buns
- Founded: 1992
- Ground: The Oval
- Capacity: 250
- Chairman: Gavin Fry
- League: Cymru South
- 2024–25: Ardal SW League, 2nd of 16 (promoted via play-off)
| Home colours | Away colours |

Ynyshir Albions F.C. are a Welsh football team based in the village Ynyshir in the Rhondda Valley. The club plays in the Cymru South.

== History ==
The club was founded in 1992. They were promoted to the Welsh Football League from the South Wales Alliance Premier Division in 2019.

They joined the newly formed Ardal Leagues for the 2020–21 season although the season was cancelled due to the Coronavirus pandemic. The following season they finished second in the inaugural season of the Ardal South West. As league runners-up they played the runners-up of the Ardal Southeast in a playoff match for promotion to the tier 2 Cymru South, beating Abertillery Bluebirds 3–0. They finished bottom of the Cymru South in the 2022–23 season and were relegated back into the Ardal Leagues.

== Honours ==
- Ardal Southern playoff final
  - Winners: 2021–22, 2024–25
- Ardal SW League
  - Runners-up: 2021–22, 2024–25
- South Wales Alliance League
  - Premier Division – Champions (1) : 2018–19
  - Premier Division – Runners-up (1) : 2017–18
  - Division One – Runners-up (1) : 2016–17
  - Division Two – Champions (1) : 2015–16
- South Wales Senior League
  - Division One – Champions (1) : 2002–03
  - Division One – Runners-up (3): 1999–2000; 2003–04; 2004–05
  - Division Two – Champions (2): 1998–99; 2007–08
  - Division Two – Runners-up (2): 1998–99; 2011–12
- Rhondda & District League
  - Champions: 1997–98
- South Wales FA Senior Cup
  - Winners: 2003–04
- Bruty Cup
  - Winners: 2001–02

== History ==
A number of other teams have historically existed in Ynyshir; Wattstown A.F.C, Ynyshir Rangers F.C, Ynyshir Albion F.C and Ynyshir United F.C.
