= South Wales Premier League =

Association football league in Wales

- Founded: 2015
- Country: Wales
- Divisions: 4
- Number of clubs: 49
- Level on pyramid: 4–6
- Promotion to: Ardal Leagues
- Relegation to: Aberdare Valley League; Bridgend & District League; Cardiff & District League; Cardiff Combination League; Merthyr & District League; Port Talbot League; Rhondda & District League; Taff Ely & Rhymney Valley League; Vale of Glamorgan League
- Current champions: Port Talbot Town (2025–26)
- Website: South Wales Premier League

The South Wales Premier League is a football league structure in South Wales, currently known for sponsorship reasons as The Highadmit Projects South Wales Premier League. The top tier of the league, the Premier Division is at the fourth tier of the Welsh Football Pyramid and offers promotion opportunities to the tier 3 Football Association of Wales administered Ardal Leagues. The league is run by the South Wales Football Association.

The league was formed in 2015 by a merger of the South Wales Senior League and the South Wales Amateur League as the South Wales Alliance League.

In April 2022, the league, after discussions with the South Wales Football Association, announced planned changes to the league structure from the 2023–24 season. The current set up of three divisions of sixteen clubs will move to four divisions of twelve with a Premier Division, Division One and two regionalised Division Twos. As a result of this at the end of the 2022–23 season, teams finishing in 11th to 16th places in the Premier Division were relegated to Division One (renamed as the 'Championship Division').

During the summer of 2024, the league was renamed as the 'South Wales Premier League'.

== Member clubs for 2026–27 season ==
The following clubs will compete.

=== Premier Division ===
- AFC Wattstown
- Aber Valley
- Afan United
- Bridgend Street
- Clwb Cymric
- Ely Rangers
- Llantwit Fardre
- Pencoed Athletic
- Pontyclun
- Porthcawl Town Athletic
- Tata Steel United
- Treherbert

=== Championship Division ===
- Cardiff Bay Warriors
- Cardiff Cosmopolitan
- Dinas Powys
- FC Cwmaman
- Llangeinor
- Margam
- Pentyrch Rangers
- Penygraig United
- Splott
- Ton Pentre
- Treforest
- Treharris Athletic Western

=== Division One East ===
- AFC Bargoed
- AFC Penrhiwceiber
- Cwmbach Royal Stars
- Cwm Welfare
- Cwrt Rawlin
- Llanrumney United
- Porth Harlequins
- Red Lion BGC
- Splott Albion
- Tongwynlais
- Trelewis Welfare
- Treorchy BGC

=== Division One West ===
- Barry Athletic
- Bettws
- Caerau All Whites
- Cardiff Hibernian
- Cogan Coronation
- FC Porthcawl
- Grange Albion
- Llanishen
- Sully Sports
- Tonypandy Albion
- Tonyrefail BGC
- Vale United

== Recent champions ==
Season	Premier Division	Division One	Division Two
2015–16	Trefelin BGC	Canton Liberal	Ynyshir Albions
2016–17	Pontyclun	Cardiff Draconians	Garw SBGC
2017–18	Penydarren BGC	Cefn Cribwr	Blaenrhondda
2018–19	Ynyshir Albions	Porthcawl Town Athletic	Llanrumney United
2019–20	Pencoed Athletic	Aber Valley	Maesteg Park
2020–21	No competition		
2021–22	Baglan Dragons	Cardiff Airport	Treherbert BGC
2022–23	Cardiff Corinthians	Caerphilly Athletic	Llantwit Fardre

Season	Premier Division	Championship	Division One East	Division One West
2023–24	FC Cwmaman	Ely Rangers	Cwmbach Royal Stars	Afan United
2024–25	Cardiff Airport	Afan United	AFC Penrhiwceiber	Llangeinor
2025–26	Port Talbot Town	Dinas Powys	Splott	Margam YC
