= Penydarren B.G.C. =

Association football club in Wales

Coordinates: 51°45′33.7″N 3°21′42.4″W

Penydarren BGC
- Full name: Penydarren Boys & Girls Club
- Nickname: The Pen
- Founded: 1985
- Ground: The Bont Playing Fields, Penydarren, Merthyr Tydfil
- Manager: Kerry Mullin
- League: South Wales Premier League Premier Division
- 2025–26: South Wales Premier League Premier Division, 2nd of 13 (promoted)
Home colours	Away colours

Penydarren BGC is a football club based in Penydarren, Merthyr Tydfil, who play in the South Wales Premier League Premier Division.

== History ==
During the 2018–19 season they gained promotion to the Welsh Football League Division One. They are best known for their run in the 2017–18 Welsh Cup, where they made the quarter-final, facing Bangor City.

== JD Welsh Cup Run - 2017–18 ==
Round	Opponent	Score
Qualifying Round 1	Penrhiwceiber Rangers	5-3
Qualifying Round 2	Brecon Corries	3-1
Round 1	Cardiff Corries	4-0
Round 2	STM Sports	2-1
Round 3	Llandudno Junction	4-0
Last 16	Pontypridd Town	2-1
Quarter-final	Bangor City	0-7

== Honours ==
- South Wales Premier League – Runners-up: 2025–26
- South Wales Senior League Division Two – Champions: - 1994–95
- South Wales Alliance League – Champions: - 2017–18
- Welsh Football League Division Three – Champions: - 2018–19
- Welsh Football League Cup – Champions: - 2018–19
