= 2012–13 Welsh Alliance League =

Welsh Alliance League
- Season: 2012–13
- Dates: 10 August 2012 – 11 May 2013
- Champions: Division 1 – Caernarfon Town; Division 2 – Llandyrnog United
- Relegated: Division 1 – Llangefni Town
- Matches: 366
- Goals: 1,545 (4.22 per match)
- Biggest home win: Division 1 Holywell Town 10–0 Nefyn United (13 April 2013); Division 2 Greenfield 10–0 Connah's Quay Town (8 May 2013)
- Biggest away win: Division 1 Nefyn United 0–10 Holywell Town (23 March 2013); Division 2 Amlwch Town 0–7 Meliden (6 April 2013)
- Highest attendance: 650 – Division 1 Caernarfon Town 3–2 Llanrug United (14 September 2012); 250 – Division 2 Blaenau Ffestiniog Amateur 0–4 Penrhyndeudraeth (9 April 2013)
- All statistics correct as of 12 March 2019.

The 2012–13 Welsh Alliance League, known as the Lock Stock Welsh Alliance League for sponsorship reasons, is the 29th season of the Welsh Alliance League, which consists of two divisions: the third and fourth levels of the Welsh football pyramid.

There are fifteen teams in Division 1 and thirteen teams in Division 2, with the champions of Division 1 promoted to the Cymru Alliance and the bottom team relegated to Division 2. In Division 2, the champions, and runners-up are promoted to Division 1.

The season began on 10 August 2012 and concluded on 11 May 2013 with Caernarfon Town as Division 1 champions and Llangefni Town relegated to Division 2. In Division 2, Llandyrnog United were champions with Llanfairpwll as runners-up.

== Division 1 ==
=== Teams ===
Holyhead Hotspur were champions in the previous season and were promoted to the Cymru Alliance. They were replaced by Llangefni Town who were relegated from the Cymru Alliance.

Llanfairpwll and Caernarfon Wanderers were relegated and replaced by Division 2 champions, Glantraeth and runners-up, Llanberis, who were promoted to Division 1.

Locations of the Division 1 teams of the 2012–13 Welsh Alliance League

==== Grounds and locations ====
Team	Location	Ground
Barmouth & Dyffryn United	Barmouth	Wern Mynach
Bodedern Athletic	Bodedern	Cae'r Ysgol
Caernarfon Town	Caernarfon	The Oval
Denbigh Town	Denbigh	Central Park
Glan Conwy	Glan Conwy	Cae Ffwt
Glantraeth	Bodorgan	Trefdraeth
Gwalchmai	Gwalchmai	Maes Meurig
Holywell Town	Holywell	Halkyn Road
Llanberis	Llanberis	Ffordd Padarn
Llandudno Junction	Llandudno Junction	Arriva Ground
Llangefni Town	Llangefni	Bob Parry Field
Llanrug United	Llanrug	Eithin Duon
Llanrwst United	Llanrwst	Gwydir Park
Nefyn United	Nefyn	Cae'r Delyn
Pwllheli	Pwllheli	Leisure Centre, Recreation Road

=== League table ===
Pos	Team	Pld	W	D	L	GF	GA	GD	Pts	Promotion or relegation
1	Caernarfon Town (C, P)	28	21	3	4	91	30	+61	66	Promotion to Cymru Alliance
2	Denbigh Town	28	20	4	4	89	39	+50	64	
3	Holywell Town	28	18	7	3	98	38	+60	61	
4	Barmouth & Dyffryn United	28	14	5	9	60	59	+1	47	
5	Llanrug United	28	14	4	10	70	43	+27	46	
6	Llanberis	28	13	5	10	65	51	+14	44	
7	Llanrwst United	28	10	8	10	55	42	+13	38	
8	Gwalchmai	28	11	5	12	53	55	−2	38	
9	Glantraeth	28	11	2	15	57	59	−2	35	
10	Pwllheli	28	10	5	13	45	66	−21	35	
11	Glan Conwy	28	8	8	12	45	58	−13	32	
12	Bodedern Athletic	28	9	2	17	40	60	−20	29	
13	Nefyn United	28	8	4	16	40	81	−41	28	
14	Llandudno Junction	28	8	2	18	42	69	−27	26	
15	Llangefni Town (R)	28	2	2	24	18	118	−100	8	Relegation to Division 2

Source: Welsh Alliance League, NonLeagueMatters
Rules for classification: 1) Points; 2) Goal difference; 3) Goals scored; 4) Matches won; 5) Play-off.
(C) Champions; (P) Promoted; (R) Relegated

=== Results ===
Home \ Away	BDU	BOD	CAE	DEN	GLC	GLA	GWA	HOL	LNB	LNJ	LLG	LRU	LRW	NEF	PWL
Barmouth & Dyffryn United	—	3–0	0–2	4–2	0–0	3–2	3–0	1–3	3–0	3–2	4–1	0–6	2–2	2–0	0–1
Bodedern Athletic	3–4	—	1–1	0–1	2–0	2–1	3–1	1–2	1–5	1–0	9–0	1–2	1–1	2–0	1–2
Caernarfon Town	9–2	2–0	—	5–3	7–0	4–2	4–0	1–2	2–1	2–1	5–1	3–2	1–1	2–0	3–1
Denbigh Town	6–2	3–0	2–1	—	5–1	1–1	5–0	2–2	4–0	2–3	8–1	1–3	2–1	3–2	9–1
Glan Conwy	4–0	4–0	2–3	2–3	—	3–2	4–1	1–1	1–0	1–3	2–1	1–3	0–2	5–5	2–0
Glantraeth	0–1	2–1	1–0	1–1	7–1	—	1–3	1–3	1–3	0–2	1–0	3–1	3–2	4–1	4–0
Gwalchmai	3–3	2–1	2–5	1–3	1–1	2–4	—	1–1	2–1	5–1	3–0	0–1	3–0	2–1	4–1
Holywell Town	1–2	6–0	2–0	0–4	1–0	7–0	4–4	—	1–2	7–1	2–0	4–3	4–3	10–0	5–1
Llanberis	2–2	4–2	2–3	3–5	3–1	3–1	1–2	2–2	—	1–3	7–1	2–2	1–0	6–1	5–4
Llandudno Junction	2–0	1–2	1–6	2–5	2–2	2–5	1–4	1–3	2–2	—	2–0	0–2	0–1	3–1	3–1
Llangefni Town	1–9	0–3	0–6	0–1	1–4	0–5	1–0	1–7	1–1	2–0	—	0–7	0–7	1–2	0–4
Llanrug United	2–3	7–0	1–2	1–2	1–1	3–1	2–2	2–2	0–2	3–2	4–1	—	1–2	2–0	5–2
Llanrwst United	1–1	4–0	0–0	0–3	1–1	4–2	2–1	1–3	2–3	3–0	6–0	4–2	—	1–1	1–2
Nefyn United	3–1	0–3	0–7	0–1	1–1	3–2	0–4	0–10	2–1	2–0	7–2	1–0	4–2	—	2–2
Pwllheli	1–2	2–0	0–5	2–2	2–0	3–0	1–0	3–3	0–2	3–2	2–2	1–2	1–1	2–1	—

Source: Welsh Alliance League – Division 1 Results Grid, - NonLeagueMatters - Welsh Alliance League Division 1 - Results / Fixtures
Legend: Blue = home team win; Yellow = draw; Red = away team win.

== Division 2 ==
=== Teams ===
Glantraeth were champions in the previous season and were promoted to Division 1 along with runners-up, Llanberis. They were replaced by Gwynedd League champions, Penrhyndeudraeth and Vale of Clwyd and Conwy Football League runners-up, Meliden who were promoted to Division 2.

Locations of the Division 2 teams of the 2012–13 Welsh Alliance League

==== Grounds and locations ====
Team	Location	Ground
Amlwch Town	Amlwch	Lôn Bach
Blaenau Ffestiniog Amateur	Blaenau Ffestiniog	Cae Clyd
Connah's Quay Town	Connah's Quay	Dock Road
Gaerwen	Gaerwen	Lôn Groes
Greenfield	Greenfield	Bagillt Road
Halkyn United	Halkyn	Pant Newydd
Kinmel Bay	Kinmel Bay	Y Morfa
Llandyrnog United	Llandyrnog	Cae Nant
Llanfairpwll	Llanfairpwllgwyngyll	Maes Eilian
Meliden	Meliden	Ffordd Tŷ Newydd
Nantlle Vale	Penygroes	Maes Dulyn
Penmaenmawr Phoenix	Penmaenmawr	Cae Sling
Penrhyndeudraeth	Penrhyndeudraeth	Maes Y Parc

=== League table ===
Pos	Team	Pld	W	D	L	GF	GA	GD	Pts	Promotion or relegation
1	Llandyrnog United (C, P)	24	18	4	2	66	29	+37	58	Promotion to Division 1
2	Llanfairpwll (P)	24	18	3	3	66	26	+40	57	Promotion to Division 1
3	Penrhyndeudraeth	24	15	3	6	73	32	+41	48	
4	Kinmel Bay (Note: Kinmel Bay were deducted three points for non fulfilment of fixture.)	24	15	4	5	48	32	+16	46	
5	Meliden	24	13	3	8	73	38	+35	42	
6	Greenfield	24	11	4	9	75	55	+20	37	
7	Penmaenmawr Phoenix	24	10	4	10	47	50	−3	34	
8	Halkyn United	24	8	6	10	45	48	−3	30	
9	Blaenau Ffestiniog Amateur	24	7	4	13	48	79	−31	25	
10	Gaerwen	24	4	4	16	38	65	−27	16	
11	Connah's Quay Town (Note: Connah's Quay Town were deducted nine points for non fulfilment of fixture.)	24	6	5	13	38	75	−37	14	
12	Amlwch Town	24	3	5	16	21	67	−46	14	
13	Nantlle Vale	24	2	3	19	39	81	−42	9	

Source: Welsh Alliance League, NonLeagueMatters
Rules for classification: 1) Points; 2) Goal difference; 3) Goals scored; 4) Matches won; 5) Play-off.
(C) Champions; (P) Promoted

=== Results ===
Home \ Away	AML	BFA	CQT	GAR	GRE	HAL	KIN	LLD	LPG	MEL	NAN	PHO	PEN
Amlwch Town	—	1–1	1–1	0–0	0–5	0–3	0–0	0–6	0–1	0–7	5–2	3–3	0–3
Blaenau Ffestiniog Amateur	3–0	—	1–2	2–3	2–4	3–2	2–3	0–4	2–4	3–3	5–1	2–0	0–4
Connah's Quay Town	2–0	3–3	—	2–0	3–0	2–2	2–3	2–4	3–5	1–1	2–1	0–3	0–5
Gaerwen	1–3	2–3	3–5	—	5–4	3–3	2–3	1–3	1–2	3–2	0–3	3–4	0–4
Greenfield	3–2	8–2	10–0	3–3	—	2–1	1–1	2–2	3–4	0–5	5–3	9–0	1–5
Halkyn United	4–1	3–4	2–1	2–1	3–3	—	0–2	1–2	1–1	3–2	3–2	1–0	2–2
Kinmel Bay	6–0	3–2	1–0	2–0	4–0	0–4	—	1–1	0–1	2–1	5–2	4–0	3–2
Llandyrnog United	2–0	2–2	4–1	5–0	3–1	2–1	2–0	—	2–2	3–2	5–1	1–0	2–0
Llanfairpwll	4–0	6–0	6–0	3–0	1–0	3–1	0–1	2–3	—	3–1	2–0	3–0	2–1
Meliden	3–1	7–1	6–0	2–1	1–2	4–1	5–0	4–2	0–1	—	6–3	3–2	2–1
Nantlle Vale	1–2	2–4	4–3	1–4	1–5	1–1	1–1	2–3	1–5	1–3	—	1–3	0–3
Penmaenmawr Phoenix	2–1	8–0	2–2	1–1	1–2	5–1	0–2	3–1	2–2	2–1	3–2	—	3–1
Penrhyndeudraeth	4–1	4–1	8–1	3–1	3–2	2–0	4–1	1–2	4–3	2–2	3–3	4–0	—

Source: Welsh Alliance League – Division 2 Results Grid, - NonLeagueMatters - Welsh Alliance League Division 2 - Results / Fixtures
Legend: Blue = home team win; Yellow = draw; Red = away team win.
