= 2015–16 Welsh Alliance League =

Welsh Alliance League
- Season: 2015–16
- Dates: 8 August 2015 – 28 May 2016
- Champions: Division 1 – Trearddur Bay; Division 2 – Greenfield
- Relegated: Division 1 – Llanfairpwll
- Matches: 396
- Goals: 1,664 (4.2 per match)
- Biggest home win: Division 1 St Asaph City 10–0 Pwllheli (10 October 2015); Division 2 Greenfield 16–2 Blaenau Ffestiniog Amateur (5 March 2016)
- Biggest away win: Division 1 St Asaph City 0–6 Llandudno Junction (19 April 2016); Division 2 Blaenau Ffestiniog Amateur 2–8 Prestatyn Sports (10 October 2015)
- Highest attendance: 409 – Division 1 Llangefni Town 4–0 Llanfairpwll (29 August 2015); 376 – Division 2 Pentraeth 10–2 Gaerwen (31 August 2015)
- All statistics correct as of 5 March 2019.

The 2015–16 Welsh Alliance League, known as the Lock Stock Welsh Alliance League for sponsorship reasons, is the 32nd season of the Welsh Alliance League, which consists of two divisions: the third and fourth levels of the Welsh football pyramid.

There are sixteen teams in Division 1 and thirteen teams in Division 2. The bottom team of Division 1 is relegated to Division 2 and in Division 2, the champions and runners-up are promoted to Division 1.

The season began on 8 August 2015 and concluded on 28 May 2016 with Trearddur Bay as Division 1 champions and Llanfairpwll were relegated to Division 2. In Division 2, Greenfield were champions with Nantlle Vale as runners-up. Both teams were promoted to Division 1.

== Division 1 ==
=== Teams ===
Holywell Town were champions in the previous season and were promoted to the Cymru Alliance. They were replaced by St Asaph City, Llangefni Town and Trearddur Bay, who were Division 2 champions, second and third place runners-ups, respectively from the previous season were promoted to Division 1.

Locations of the Division 1 teams of the 2015–16 Welsh Alliance League

==== Grounds and locations ====
Team	Location	Ground
Abergele Town	Llandudno	The Giant Hospitality Stadium
Barmouth & Dyffryn United	Barmouth	Wern Mynach
Glan Conwy	Glan Conwy	Cae Ffwt
Glantraeth	Bodorgan	Trefdraeth
Gwalchmai	Gwalchmai	Maes Meurig
Llanberis	Llanberis	Ffordd Padarn
Llandudno Junction	Llandudno Junction	Arriva Ground
Llandyrnog United	Llandyrnog	Cae Nant
Llanfairpwll	Llanfairpwllgwyngyll	Maes Eilian
Llangefni Town	Llangefni	Bob Parry Field
Llanrug United	Llanrug	Eithin Duon
Llanrwst United	Llanrwst	Gwydir Park
Penrhyndeudraeth	Penrhyndeudraeth	Maes Y Parc
Pwllheli	Pwllheli	Leisure Centre, Recreation Road
St Asaph City	St Asaph	Roe Plas
Trearddur Bay	Trearddur	Lon Isallt

=== League table ===
Pos	Team	Pld	W	D	L	GF	GA	GD	Pts	Promotion or relegation
1	Trearddur Bay (C)	30	22	7	1	85	31	+54	73	
2	Llandudno Junction	30	21	7	2	86	37	+49	70	
3	Llangefni Town	30	19	5	6	65	44	+21	62	
4	Glantraeth (Note: Glantraeth were deducted three points for non fulfilment of fixture.)	30	18	6	6	65	42	+23	57	
5	Llanrug United	30	16	7	7	68	36	+32	55	
6	Penrhyndeudraeth	30	15	5	10	81	53	+28	50	
7	Glan Conwy	30	13	2	15	71	67	+4	41	
8	Abergele Town	30	12	3	15	41	51	−10	39	
9	Gwalchmai (Note: Gwalchmai resigned from the Welsh Alliance League at the end of the season.)	30	11	3	16	43	61	−18	36	
10	Barmouth & Dyffryn United	30	11	2	17	37	59	−22	35	
11	Llanberis	30	8	9	13	46	48	−2	33	
12	St Asaph City	30	10	3	17	57	65	−8	33	
13	Llanrwst United	30	9	5	16	39	61	−22	32	
14	Pwllheli (Note: Pwllheli were deducted three points for non fulfilment of fixture.)	30	7	8	15	45	66	−21	26	
15	Llandyrnog United (Note: Llandyrnog United were deducted three points for non fulfilment of fixture.)	30	7	5	18	41	72	−31	23	
16	Llanfairpwll (R)	30	1	3	26	20	97	−77	6	Relegation to Division 2

Source: Welsh Alliance League, NonLeagueMatters
Rules for classification: 1) Points; 2) Goal difference; 3) Goals scored; 4) Matches won; 5) Play-off.
(C) Champions; (R) Relegated

=== Results ===
Home \ Away	ABE	BDU	GLC	GLA	GWA	LNB	LNJ	LLD	LPG	LLG	LRU	LRW	PEN	PWL	STA	TRE
Abergele Town	—	2–1	0–4	1–0	3–2	1–3	2–0	6–0	1–0	0–3	2–1	0–1	0–4	0–1	1–1	0–2
Barmouth & Dyffryn United	0–2	—	1–1	1–3	3–1	3–1	0–5	1–1	4–1	3–0	0–1	1–2	0–1	2–1	1–0	0–1
Glan Conwy	5–3	1–2	—	1–0	5–2	3–2	1–4	5–0	5–3	4–3	1–2	3–0	3–5	1–3	1–2	0–1
Glantraeth	1–0	2–1	3–2	—	3–1	1–1	2–2	1–1	2–1	7–3	0–2	5–1	1–0	5–1	3–0	2–2
Gwalchmai	2–0	0–4	4–2	1–3	—	3–1	0–5	4–0	2–0	0–3	0–3	0–1	4–1	2–0	2–0	0–3
Llanberis	2–1	5–1	2–3	4–1	1–2	—	1–2	2–0	3–0	2–2	1–0	2–2	2–2	1–1	0–1	0–3
Llandudno Junction	3–0	2–0	3–1	2–1	2–2	1–1	—	3–1	6–1	1–1	3–2	5–2	2–0	3–3	3–1	2–2
Llandyrnog United	0–1	4–1	7–5	3–4	1–0	2–0	1–2	—	3–3	2–3	1–4	0–2	1–1	0–4	2–1	2–3
Llanfairpwll	0–2	0–3	1–4	0–1	1–3	1–1	0–2	2–1	—	0–1	0–4	0–0	0–4	1–4	0–2	0–4
Llangefni Town	2–2	3–1	1–1	1–1	1–0	1–0	4–1	2–1	4–0	—	1–0	3–0	2–1	3–2	6–1	3–2
Llanrug United	4–1	3–0	1–0	2–3	0–1	1–1	3–5	1–1	7–1	2–1	—	2–1	4–1	1–1	4–2	1–1
Llanrwst United	2–4	0–1	0–1	0–1	4–0	1–0	1–3	0–3	4–0	1–3	1–1	—	0–3	2–2	3–2	0–1
Penrhyndeudraeth	3–2	9–0	4–3	4–2	4–1	2–3	2–3	3–2	5–2	1–3	3–3	4–0	—	0–2	5–3	1–2
Pwllheli	0–1	0–1	4–2	0–2	3–3	2–2	0–3	0–1	2–1	1–2	1–4	3–3	2–2	—	1–2	0–1
St Asaph City	1–1	3–1	1–2	0–1	1–1	1–0	0–6	3–0	7–1	3–0	1–4	3–4	0–5	10–0	—	2–3
Trearddur Bay	3–2	4–0	3–1	4–4	3–0	4–2	2–2	5–0	6–0	4–0	1–1	5–1	1–1	5–1	4–3	—

Source: Welsh Alliance League – Division 1 Results Grid, - NonLeagueMatters - Welsh Alliance League Division 1 - Results / Fixtures
Legend: Blue = home team win; Yellow = draw; Red = away team win.

== Division 2 ==
=== Teams ===
St Asaph City were champions in the previous season and were promoted to Division 1 along with runners-ups, Llangefni Town and Trearddur Bay. They were replaced by Gwynedd League champions, Llanllyfni and Vale of Clwyd and Conwy Football League champions, Prestatyn Sports were promoted to Division 2.

Locations of the Division 2 teams of the 2015–16 Welsh Alliance League

==== Grounds and locations ====
Team	Location	Ground
Amlwch Town	Amlwch	Lôn Bach
Blaenau Ffestiniog Amateur	Blaenau Ffestiniog	Cae Clyd
Gaerwen	Gaerwen	Lôn Groes
Greenfield	Greenfield	Bagillt Road
Llanllyfni	Llanllyfni	King George the 5th Playing Field
Llannerch-y-medd	Llanerch-y-medd	Tan Parc
Meliden	Meliden	Ffordd Tŷ Newydd
Mochdre Sports	Mochdre	Swan Road
Mynydd Llandegai	Mynydd Llandygai	Mynydd Llandegai
Nantlle Vale	Penygroes	Maes Dulyn
Penmaenmawr Phoenix	Penmaenmawr	Cae Sling
Pentraeth	Pentraeth	Bryniau Field
Prestatyn Sports	Prestatyn	Gronant Playing Fields

=== League table ===
Pos	Team	Pld	W	D	L	GF	GA	GD	Pts	Promotion or relegation
1	Greenfield (C, P)	24	21	2	1	94	36	+58	65	Promotion to Division 1
2	Nantlle Vale (P)	24	18	2	4	77	39	+38	56	Promotion to Division 1
3	Llanllyfni	24	13	7	4	76	46	+30	46	
4	Mynydd Llandegai	24	13	3	8	59	61	−2	42	
5	Pentraeth	24	11	5	8	75	47	+28	38	
6	Prestatyn Sports	24	11	4	9	72	57	+15	37	
7	Mochdre Sports	24	8	6	10	46	59	−13	30	
8	Meliden	24	9	2	13	59	65	−6	29	
9	Amlwch Town	24	8	4	12	44	59	−15	28	
10	Penmaenmawr Phoenix	24	7	5	12	49	54	−5	26	
11	Llannerch-y-medd	24	7	3	14	33	58	−25	24	
12	Blaenau Ffestiniog Amateur	24	7	0	17	55	100	−45	21	
13	Gaerwen (Note: Gaerwen were deducted three points for non fulfilment of fixture.)	24	0	3	21	35	93	−58	0	

Source: Welsh Alliance League, NonLeagueMatters
Rules for classification: 1) Points; 2) Goal difference; 3) Goals scored; 4) Matches won; 5) Play-off.
(C) Champions; (P) Promoted

=== Results ===
Home \ Away	AML	BFA	GAR	GRE	LLL	LYM	MEL	MOC	MYN	NAN	PHO	PEN	PRE
Amlwch Town	—	3–4	4–1	0–2	1–0	1–0	2–1	4–1	2–2	1–2	3–0	2–3	3–3
Blaenau Ffestiniog Amateur	3–1	—	5–1	2–4	3–7	0–1	2–4	0–2	3–4	0–2	3–1	2–1	2–8
Gaerwen	2–4	2–4	—	1–1	2–6	1–2	2–3	0–1	2–4	0–4	1–2	1–2	3–3
Greenfield	3–0	16–2	8–2	—	2–0	3–1	5–1	1–0	3–1	3–3	2–1	5–2	6–2
Llanllyfni	9–0	5–4	2–2	1–4	—	4–1	3–2	2–2	4–3	2–0	4–1	3–3	1–2
Llannerch-y-medd	1–3	3–2	3–1	1–3	2–2	—	2–5	2–0	0–2	1–3	4–3	0–2	2–1
Meliden	5–0	7–3	5–3	3–4	1–4	4–0	—	3–4	0–1	0–2	1–1	3–2	0–5
Mochdre Sports	3–3	6–1	4–1	1–5	1–2	3–3	4–1	—	2–2	2–2	5–3	0–3	1–0
Mynydd Llandegai	2–1	3–2	2–0	2–3	2–6	3–1	3–2	4–3	—	5–3	6–3	1–1	2–4
Nantlle Vale	3–0	6–3	3–2	4–1	1–2	6–2	2–1	7–1	8–0	—	3–2	2–1	3–2
Penmaenmawr Phoenix	2–2	6–2	4–1	3–4	1–1	3–0	2–2	0–0	3–0	1–2	—	1–0	1–2
Pentraeth	3–1	6–1	10–2	1–3	4–4	0–0	7–0	6–0	3–2	3–4	6–1	—	5–5
Prestatyn Sports	4–3	1–2	7–2	2–3	2–2	3–1	2–5	4–0	2–3	4–2	0–4	4–1	—

Source: Welsh Alliance League – Division 2 Results Grid, - NonLeagueMatters - Welsh Alliance League Division 2 - Results / Fixtures
Legend: Blue = home team win; Yellow = draw; Red = away team win.
