= 2016–17 Welsh Alliance League =

Welsh Alliance League
- Season: 2016–17
- Dates: 12 August 2016 – 13 May 2017
- Champions: Division 1 – Glantraeth; Division 2 – Llandudno Albion
- Relegated: Division 1 – Glan Conwy
- Matches played: 422
- Goals scored: 1,731 (4.1 per match)
- Biggest home win: Division 1 Llangefni Town 10–1 Glan Conwy (10 May 2017); Division 2 Llandudno Albion 8–1 Cemaes Bay (11 February 2017); Llandudno Albion 8–1 Blaenau Ffestiniog Amateur (24 February 2017)
- Biggest away win: Division 1 Llanrwst United 0–8 Glantraeth (10 December 2016); Division 2 Pentraeth 1–8 Mynydd Llandegai (24 August 2016); Llanfairpwll 1–8 Amlwch Town (17 September 2016)
- Highest attendance: 250 – Division 1 Llangefni Town 2–3 Glantraeth (31 December 2016); 250 – Division 2 Amlwch Town 2–1 Cemaes Bay (15 October 2016); Llanfairpwll 1–0 Cemaes Bay (5 April 2017)
- All statistics correct as of 26 February 2019.

The 2016–17 Welsh Alliance League, known as the Lock Stock Welsh Alliance League for sponsorship reasons, is the 33rd season of the Welsh Alliance League, which consists of two divisions: the third and fourth levels of the Welsh football pyramid.

There are fourteen teams in Division 1 and sixteen teams in Division 2, with the champions of Division 1 promoted to the Cymru Alliance and the bottom team relegated to Division 2. In Division 2, the champions and runners-up are promoted to Division 1.

The season began on 12 August 2016 and concluded on 13 May 2017 with Glantraeth as Division 1 champions and Glan Conwy were relegated to Division 2. In Division 2, Llandudno Albion were champions with Mynydd Llandegai as runners-up. Both teams were promoted to Division 1.

== Division 1 ==
=== Teams ===
Trearddur Bay were defending champions from the previous season. Greenfield and Nantlle Vale, who were Division 2 champions and runners-up, respectively from the previous season were promoted to Division 1.

Locations of the Division 1 teams of the 2016–17 Welsh Alliance League

==== Grounds and locations ====
| Team | Location | Ground |
|---|---|---|
| Abergele Town | Llandudno | The Giant Hospitality Stadium |
| Barmouth & Dyffryn United | Barmouth | Wern Mynach |
| Glan Conwy | Glan Conwy | Cae Ffwt |
| Glantraeth | Bodorgan | Trefdraeth |
| Greenfield | Greenfield | Bagillt Road |
| Llanberis | Llanberis | Ffordd Padarn |
| Llandudno Junction | Llandudno Junction | Arriva Ground |
| Llandyrnog United | Llandyrnog | Cae Nant |
| Llangefni Town | Llangefni | Bob Parry Field |
| Llanrug United | Llanrug | Eithin Duon |
| Llanrwst United | Llanrwst | Gwydir Park |
| Nantlle Vale | Penygroes | Maes Dulyn |
| Penrhyndeudraeth | Penrhyndeudraeth | Maes Y Parc |
| Pwllheli | Pwllheli | Leisure Centre, Recreation Road |
| St Asaph City | St Asaph | Roe Plas |
| Trearddur Bay | Trearddur | Lon Isallt |

=== League table ===
| Pos | Team | Pld | W | D | L | GF | GA | GD | Pts | Promotion or relegation |
|---|---|---|---|---|---|---|---|---|---|---|
| 1 | Glantraeth (Note: Glantraeth resigned from the Welsh Alliance League at the end of the season.) (C) | 30 | 23 | 4 | 3 | 90 | 29 | +61 | 73 | |
| 2 | Llandudno Junction | 30 | 18 | 3 | 9 | 79 | 47 | +32 | 57 | |
| 3 | Llangefni Town | 30 | 17 | 6 | 7 | 69 | 37 | +32 | 57 | |
| 4 | Llanrug United | 30 | 16 | 6 | 8 | 77 | 52 | +25 | 54 | |
| 5 | Greenfield | 30 | 15 | 5 | 10 | 57 | 44 | +13 | 50 | |
| 6 | Penrhyndeudraeth | 30 | 14 | 7 | 9 | 66 | 46 | +20 | 49 | |
| 7 | Trearddur Bay | 30 | 14 | 4 | 12 | 58 | 58 | 0 | 46 | |
| 8 | Llandyrnog United | 30 | 12 | 8 | 10 | 55 | 55 | 0 | 44 | |
| 9 | Nantlle Vale | 30 | 11 | 6 | 13 | 67 | 64 | +3 | 39 | |
| 10 | St Asaph City | 30 | 11 | 5 | 14 | 60 | 61 | −1 | 38 | |
| 11 | Llanberis | 30 | 10 | 5 | 15 | 44 | 59 | −15 | 35 | |
| 12 | Abergele Town (Note: Abergele Town were deducted three points for non fulfilment of fixture.) | 30 | 10 | 7 | 13 | 45 | 62 | −17 | 34 | |
| 13 | Pwllheli | 30 | 9 | 5 | 16 | 61 | 76 | −15 | 32 | |
| 14 | Barmouth & Dyffryn United | 30 | 9 | 5 | 16 | 51 | 79 | −28 | 32 | |
| 15 | Llanrwst United | 30 | 7 | 5 | 18 | 28 | 68 | −40 | 26 | |
| 16 | Glan Conwy (R) | 30 | 2 | 3 | 25 | 35 | 105 | −70 | 9 | Relegation to Division 2 |

Source: Welsh Alliance League, NonLeagueMatters
Rules for classification: 1) Points; 2) Goal difference; 3) Goals scored; 4) Matches won; 5) Play-off.
(C) Champions; (R) Relegated

=== Results ===
| Home \ Away | ABE | BDU | GLC | GLA | GRE | LNB | LNJ | LLD | LLG | LRU | LRW | NAN | PEN | PWL | STA | TRE |
|---|---|---|---|---|---|---|---|---|---|---|---|---|---|---|---|---|
| Abergele Town | — | 1–0 | 1–0 | 0–4 | 0–2 | 3–0 | 1–3 | 1–3 | 0–3 | 2–0 | 3–2 | 1–1 | 0–3 | 4–2 | 1–1 | 1–5 |
| Barmouth & Dyffryn United | 5–3 | — | 4–1 | 1–5 | 3–5 | 4–2 | 1–2 | 2–2 | 0–2 | 1–2 | 1–1 | 4–0 | 0–0 | 3–6 | 2–1 | 1–4 |
| Glan Conwy | 0–7 | 2–3 | — | 2–3 | 1–4 | 1–1 | 1–4 | 0–2 | 3–4 | 1–2 | 1–2 | 3–3 | 1–4 | 3–8 | 2–1 | 2–1 |
| Glantraeth | 4–2 | 3–1 | 4–1 | — | 0–1 | 1–0 | 3–1 | 5–0 | 4–1 | 4–2 | 5–1 | 2–0 | 2–3 | 5–0 | 2–0 | 6–1 |
| Greenfield | 3–1 | 0–1 | 4–0 | 1–2 | — | 3–3 | 1–1 | 3–1 | 0–0 | 2–0 | 3–0 | 0–0 | 3–2 | 4–0 | 4–2 | 0–1 |
| Llanberis | 1–1 | 4–2 | 3–3 | 0–3 | 0–1 | — | 2–1 | 2–3 | 2–1 | 0–3 | 1–4 | 3–1 | 2–0 | 2–1 | 2–1 | 0–1 |
| Llandudno Junction | 2–0 | 6–0 | 1–0 | 2–2 | 2–3 | 5–2 | — | 4–0 | 0–0 | 2–0 | 2–0 | 6–1 | 2–1 | 4–0 | 4–6 | 2–3 |
| Llandyrnog United | 1–1 | 3–3 | 3–2 | 1–1 | 2–3 | 2–2 | 0–2 | — | 1–1 | 1–2 | 1–2 | 1–4 | 1–1 | 4–0 | 4–0 | 2–1 |
| Llangefni Town | 1–3 | 7–1 | 10–1 | 2–3 | 2–1 | 1–3 | 2–1 | 2–0 | — | 0–2 | 0–0 | 3–0 | 3–2 | 3–1 | 4–0 | 0–2 |
| Llanrug United | 5–0 | 9–2 | 4–1 | 1–1 | 4–2 | 1–0 | 4–3 | 1–3 | 1–1 | — | 3–1 | 2–1 | 3–4 | 4–4 | 0–1 | 4–2 |
| Llanrwst United | 0–2 | 1–0 | 2–0 | 0–8 | 2–2 | 1–0 | 0–2 | 1–2 | 0–5 | 0–4 | — | 2–4 | 3–0 | 0–1 | 1–4 | 0–2 |
| Nantlle Vale | 6–0 | 1–0 | 4–0 | 1–2 | 3–0 | 3–1 | 2–5 | 3–3 | 1–2 | 3–5 | 4–1 | — | 1–3 | 2–3 | 5–3 | 5–1 |
| Penrhyndeudraeth | 0–0 | 1–1 | 4–1 | 0–2 | 6–0 | 2–1 | 3–2 | 2–3 | 2–3 | 1–1 | 3–0 | 1–1 | — | 4–1 | 5–1 | 3–0 |
| Pwllheli | 1–1 | 1–2 | 5–2 | 1–1 | 2–1 | 1–3 | 3–4 | 0–2 | 1–2 | 3–3 | 0–0 | 2–3 | 6–2 | — | 2–1 | 4–0 |
| St Asaph City | 1–2 | 4–2 | 3–0 | 0–2 | 1–0 | 4–0 | 2–3 | 4–2 | 2–2 | 2–2 | 1–1 | 3–2 | 0–2 | 4–1 | — | 5–0 |
| Trearddur Bay | 3–3 | 0–1 | 4–0 | 3–1 | 2–1 | 1–2 | 4–1 | 0–2 | 0–2 | 4–3 | 4–0 | 2–2 | 2–2 | 3–1 | 2–2 | — |

Source: Welsh Alliance League – Division 1 Results Grid, - NonLeagueMatters - Welsh Alliance League Division 1 - Results / Fixtures
Legend: Blue = home team win; Yellow = draw; Red = away team win.

== Division 2 ==
=== Teams ===
Greenfield were champions in the previous season and were promoted to Division 1 along with runners-up, Nantlle Vale. They were replaced by Llanfairpwll who were relegated from Division 1.

Gwynedd League champions, Y Felinheli and third place, Cemaes Bay were promoted to Division 2.

Locations of the Division 2 teams of the 2016–17 Welsh Alliance League

==== Grounds and locations ====
| Team | Location | Ground |
|---|---|---|
| Amlwch Town | Amlwch | Lôn Bach |
| Blaenau Ffestiniog Amateur | Blaenau Ffestiniog | Cae Clyd |
| Cemaes Bay | Cemaes | School Lane |
| Gaerwen | Gaerwen | Lôn Groes |
| Llandudno Albion | Llandudno | Ffordd Dwyfor |
| Llanfairpwll | Llanfairpwllgwyngyll | Maes Eilian |
| Llannerch-y-medd | Llanerch-y-medd | Tan Parc |
| Meliden | Meliden | Ffordd Tŷ Newydd |
| Mochdre Sports | Mochdre | Swan Road |
| Mynydd Llandegai | Mynydd Llandygai | Mynydd Llandegai |
| Penmaenmawr Phoenix | Penmaenmawr | Cae Sling |
| Pentraeth | Pentraeth | Bryniau Field |
| Prestatyn Sports | Prestatyn | Gronant Playing Fields |
| Y Felinheli | Y Felinheli | Cae Selio, Bangor Street |

=== League table ===
| Pos | Team | Pld | W | D | L | GF | GA | GD | Pts | Promotion or relegation |
|---|---|---|---|---|---|---|---|---|---|---|
| 1 | Llandudno Albion (C, P) | 26 | 20 | 1 | 5 | 90 | 36 | +54 | 61 | Promotion to Division 1 |
| 2 | Mynydd Llandegai (P) | 26 | 19 | 1 | 6 | 90 | 50 | +40 | 58 | Promotion to Division 1 |
| 3 | Prestatyn Sports (Note: Prestatyn Sports were deducted three points for poor conduct.) | 26 | 17 | 2 | 7 | 93 | 51 | +42 | 50 | |
| 4 | Mochdre Sports | 26 | 15 | 3 | 8 | 52 | 37 | +15 | 48 | |
| 5 | Amlwch Town | 26 | 13 | 5 | 8 | 54 | 39 | +15 | 44 | |
| 6 | Meliden | 26 | 13 | 3 | 10 | 61 | 54 | +7 | 42 | |
| 7 | Penmaenmawr Phoenix | 26 | 13 | 1 | 12 | 56 | 59 | −3 | 40 | |
| 8 | Gaerwen | 26 | 11 | 5 | 10 | 53 | 55 | −2 | 38 | |
| 9 | Cemaes Bay | 26 | 9 | 5 | 12 | 53 | 58 | −5 | 32 | |
| 10 | Y Felinheli | 26 | 8 | 5 | 13 | 47 | 57 | −10 | 29 | |
| 11 | Llanfairpwll | 26 | 8 | 1 | 17 | 40 | 77 | −37 | 25 | |
| 12 | Pentraeth | 26 | 6 | 2 | 18 | 37 | 73 | −36 | 20 | |
| 13 | Llannerch-y-medd | 26 | 5 | 4 | 17 | 35 | 67 | −32 | 19 | |
| 14 | Blaenau Ffestiniog Amateur | 26 | 5 | 2 | 19 | 28 | 76 | −48 | 17 | |

Source: Welsh Alliance League, NonLeagueMatters
Rules for classification: 1) Points; 2) Goal difference; 3) Goals scored; 4) Matches won; 5) Play-off.
(C) Champions; (P) Promoted

=== Results ===
| Home \ Away | AML | BFA | CEM | GAR | LNA | LPG | LYM | MEL | MOC | MYN | PHO | PEN | PRE | FEL |
|---|---|---|---|---|---|---|---|---|---|---|---|---|---|---|
| Amlwch Town | — | 1–0 | 2–1 | 2–0 | 1–2 | 0–0 | 4–1 | 3–5 | 1–4 | 1–6 | 4–1 | 2–3 | 3–1 | 0–2 |
| Blaenau Ffestiniog Amateur | 0–1 | — | 2–1 | 0–5 | 1–2 | 0–2 | 0–1 | 1–4 | 1–3 | 5–2 | 2–1 | 1–1 | 3–8 | 0–2 |
| Cemaes Bay | 1–1 | 4–1 | — | 3–3 | 3–4 | 1–1 | 3–1 | 5–2 | 1–3 | 2–3 | 0–2 | 3–1 | 1–0 | 3–2 |
| Gaerwen | 2–2 | 1–0 | 1–3 | — | 0–1 | 2–1 | 2–1 | 0–2 | 2–0 | 1–3 | 4–2 | 3–1 | 3–3 | 1–3 |
| Llandudno Albion | 0–1 | 8–1 | 8–1 | 5–3 | — | 6–1 | 6–0 | 6–1 | 4–2 | 2–1 | 5–1 | 4–0 | 3–1 | 3–1 |
| Llanfairpwll | 1–8 | 1–1 | 1–0 | 1–2 | 3–1 | — | 2–0 | 1–2 | 2–0 | 0–7 | 0–3 | 1–2 | 1–5 | 5–2 |
| Llannerch-y-medd | 0–1 | 1–2 | 0–5 | 2–3 | 0–4 | 2–3 | — | 2–3 | 2–2 | 3–4 | 4–3 | 1–0 | 5–2 | 2–2 |
| Meliden | 2–3 | 5–1 | 6–1 | 3–3 | 2–1 | 3–2 | 4–1 | — | 0–2 | 0–3 | 1–0 | 2–1 | 3–5 | 2–0 |
| Mochdre Sports | 1–1 | 5–0 | 2–2 | 0–1 | 0–1 | 4–1 | 4–3 | 2–1 | — | 2–0 | 1–2 | 1–0 | 2–1 | 1–0 |
| Mynydd Llandegai | 0–4 | 4–1 | 4–1 | 5–1 | 5–4 | 3–0 | 3–2 | 3–2 | 2–0 | — | 3–0 | 5–2 | 5–4 | 5–2 |
| Penmaenmawr Phoenix | 1–0 | 4–2 | 3–1 | 2–2 | 1–4 | 5–0 | 3–1 | 3–2 | 2–3 | 3–2 | — | 1–0 | 1–5 | 3–1 |
| Pentraeth | 0–5 | 0–1 | 0–4 | 4–3 | 3–2 | 4–0 | 3–4 | 0–0 | 3–4 | 1–8 | 3–5 | — | 1–3 | 3–2 |
| Prestatyn Sports | 3–1 | 6–0 | 4–2 | 4–0 | 1–1 | 2–1 | 7–2 | 3–2 | 4–1 | 4–1 | 5–4 | 7–1 | — | 3–1 |
| Y Felinheli | 2–2 | 3–2 | 1–1 | 2–5 | 2–3 | 1–2 | 3–1 | 2–2 | 0–3 | 3–3 | 4–0 | 1–0 | 3–2 | — |

Source: Welsh Alliance League – Division 2 Results Grid, - NonLeagueMatters - Welsh Alliance League Division 2 - Results / Fixtures
Legend: Blue = home team win; Yellow = draw; Red = away team win.
