= 2011–12 Welsh Alliance League =

Welsh Alliance League
- Season: 2011–12
- Dates: 13 August 2011 – 8 May 2012
- Champions: Division 1 – Holyhead Hotspur; Division 2 – Glantraeth
- Relegated: Division 1 – Caernarfon Wanderers & Llanfairpwll
- Matches: 372
- Goals: 1,496 (4.02 per match)
- Top goalscorer: Division 1 Gareth Davies (Bethesda Athletic) 32 goals Division 2 Mark Evans (Glantraeth) 31 goals
- Biggest home win: Division 1 Holywell Town 7–0 Barmouth & Dyffryn United (5 May 2012); Division 2 Glantraeth 9–1 Gaerwen (19 November 2011); Glantraeth 9–1 Blaenau Ffestiniog Amateur (14 January 2012)
- Biggest away win: Division 1 Barmouth & Dyffryn United 3–9 Holyhead Hotspur (17 December 2011); Division 2 Amlwch Town 0–9 Kinmel Bay Sports (14 April 2012)
- Highest scoring: Division 1 Barmouth & Dyffryn United 3–9 Holyhead Hotspur (17 December 2011); Division 2 Glantraeth 9–1 Gaerwen (19 November 2011); Glantraeth 9–1 Blaenau Ffestiniog Amateur (14 January 2012)
- Highest attendance: 850 – Division 1 Caernarfon Town 2–0 Caernarfon Wanderers (27 December 2011); 150 – Division 2 Gaerwen 1–2 Glantraeth (17 August 2011); Llanberis 2–0 Penmaenmawr Phoenix (25 April 2012)
- Lowest attendance: 40 – Division 1 Bodedern Athletic 1–0 Nefyn United (10 March 2012); Bethesda Athletic 5–3 Barmouth & Dyffryn United (14 April 2012); Denbigh Town 0–2 Nefyn United (14 April 2012); 25 – Division 2 Connah's Quay Town 0–1 Amlwch Town (25 February 2012)
- Average attendance: Division 1 – 123; Division 2 – 59
- All statistics correct as of 15 March 2019.

The 2011–12 Welsh Alliance League, known as the Lock Stock Welsh Alliance League for sponsorship reasons, was the 28th season of the Welsh Alliance League, which consists of two divisions: the third and fourth levels of the Welsh football pyramid.

There were sixteen teams in Division 1 and twelve teams in Division 2, with the champions of Division 1 promoted to the Cymru Alliance and the bottom two teams relegated to Division 2. In Division 2, the champions, and runners-up were promoted to Division 1.

The season began on 13 August 2011 and concluded on 8 May 2012 with Holyhead Hotspur as Division 1 champions, Llanfairpwll and Caernarfon Wanderers, who folded at the start of the 2012–13 season, were relegated to Division 2. In Division 2, Glantraeth were champions with Llanberis as runners-up.

== Division 1 ==
=== Teams ===
Conwy United were champions in the previous season and were promoted to the Cymru Alliance.

Llanberis were relegated and replaced by Division 2 champions, Caernarfon Wanderers and runners-up, Bodedern Athletic, who were promoted to Division 1.

Locations of the Division 1 teams of the 2011–12 Welsh Alliance League

==== Grounds and locations ====
Team	Location	Ground
Barmouth & Dyffryn United	Barmouth	Wern Mynach
Bethesda Athletic	Bethesda	Parc Meurig
Bodedern Athletic	Bodedern	Cae'r Ysgol
Caernarfon Town	Caernarfon	The Oval
Caernarfon Wanderers	Caernarfon	Cae Top
Denbigh Town	Denbigh	Central Park
Glan Conwy	Glan Conwy	Cae Ffwt
Gwalchmai	Gwalchmai	Maes Meurig
Holyhead Hotspur	Holyhead	The New Stadium
Holywell Town	Holywell	Halkyn Road
Llandudno Junction	Llandudno Junction	Arriva Ground
Llanfairpwll	Llanfairpwllgwyngyll	Maes Eilian
Llanrug United	Llanrug	Eithin Duon
Llanrwst United	Llanrwst	Gwydir Park
Nefyn United	Nefyn	Cae'r Delyn
Pwllheli	Pwllheli	Leisure Centre, Recreation Road

=== League table ===
Pos	Team	Pld	W	D	L	GF	GA	GD	Pts	Promotion or relegation
1	Holyhead Hotspur (Note: Holyhead Hotspur were deducted three points for playing ineligible player.) (C, P)	30	25	1	4	87	28	+59	73	Promotion to Cymru Alliance
2	Holywell Town	30	23	3	4	77	29	+48	72	
3	Pwllheli	30	19	6	5	57	32	+25	63	
4	Caernarfon Town	30	19	3	8	67	36	+31	60	
5	Bethesda Athletic	30	16	6	8	69	52	+17	54	
6	Llanrug United	30	14	5	11	74	54	+20	47	
7	Denbigh Town	30	14	4	12	58	47	+11	46	
8	Barmouth & Dyffryn United	30	11	3	16	59	83	−24	36	
9	Gwalchmai	30	10	5	15	54	65	−11	35	
10	Llandudno Junction	30	9	7	14	60	71	−11	34	
11	Bodedern Athletic (Note: Bodedern Athletic were deducted three points for playing ineligible player.)	30	9	9	12	45	52	−7	33	
12	Glan Conwy	30	9	2	19	46	68	−22	29	
13	Nefyn United	30	7	4	19	35	70	−35	25	
14	Llanrwst United	30	4	11	15	45	69	−24	23	
15	Llanfairpwll (R)	30	6	5	19	46	78	−32	23	Relegation to Division 2
16	Caernarfon Wanderers (R)	30	6	4	20	46	91	−45	22	Relegation to Division 2

Source: Welsh Alliance League, NonLeagueMatters
Rules for classification: 1) Points; 2) Goal difference; 3) Goals scored; 4) Matches won; 5) Play-off.
(C) Champions; (P) Promoted; (R) Relegated

=== Results ===
Home \ Away	BDU	BET	BOD	CAE	CAW	DEN	GLC	GWA	HOH	HOL	LNJ	LPG	LRU	LRW	NEF	PWL
Barmouth & Dyffryn United	—	2–3	1–1	2–3	5–0	1–2	2–1	2–1	3–9	2–3	2–1	2–2	2–1	2–0	5–0	3–0
Bethesda Athletic	5–3	—	2–1	1–1	6–1	3–1	5–2	5–1	0–4	1–3	1–0	4–2	2–2	5–1	2–1	3–3
Bodedern Athletic	2–0	2–2	—	0–4	2–1	1–0	1–0	2–1	2–4	0–3	4–4	2–4	2–3	1–1	1–0	1–1
Caernarfon Town	4–1	4–0	2–1	—	2–0	2–1	3–1	1–2	2–3	1–1	4–2	0–3	2–0	0–3	5–1	0–1
Caernarfon Wanderers	1–5	0–1	2–3	0–4	—	4–4	1–0	3–3	0–3	1–5	3–4	4–4	2–5	3–1	1–1	1–3
Denbigh Town	5–1	3–2	2–0	2–1	5–1	—	4–0	3–0	2–1	0–1	0–1	4–0	1–1	2–0	0–2	2–2
Glan Conwy	2–4	0–0	0–5	0–2	2–5	1–2	—	2–1	0–1	1–3	1–1	5–1	1–4	4–2	3–2	1–3
Gwalchmai	5–0	5–1	1–1	3–6	2–1	2–1	3–2	—	1–2	2–2	2–2	2–1	2–3	2–0	3–0	1–3
Holyhead Hotspur	6–1	1–0	0–0	1–0	5–1	5–0	1–2	4–0	—	3–1	3–1	4–1	2–1	5–0	1–0	2–0
Holywell Town	7–0	3–0	1–1	1–2	4–0	3–1	3–1	2–0	2–0	—	4–3	2–0	3–0	2–1	4–0	0–2
Llandudno Junction	6–1	4–3	2–1	1–3	3–1	0–3	1–3	2–1	2–4	0–2	—	2–3	1–3	3–3	2–2	1–1
Llanfairpwll	4–1	0–1	1–1	0–2	1–3	2–1	1–3	3–3	1–2	1–3	1–2	—	2–5	1–5	2–0	2–3
Llanrug United	4–1	1–3	3–2	5–0	3–0	4–1	2–4	2–3	2–4	0–2	4–1	6–0	—	2–2	4–1	0–2
Llanrwst United	3–3	0–0	3–2	0–4	2–3	1–1	2–3	2–1	0–3	2–4	2–2	1–1	2–2	—	1–2	1–1
Nefyn United	0–2	0–4	2–3	0–0	1–3	3–5	2–1	1–0	2–1	1–3	2–5	3–2	3–1	3–3	—	0–1
Pwllheli	2–0	1–4	2–0	0–3	2–0	2–0	1–0	6–1	1–3	3–0	4–1	2–0	1–1	2–1	2–0	—

Source: Welsh Alliance League – Division 1 Results Grid, - NonLeagueMatters - Welsh Alliance League Division 1 - Results / Fixtures
Legend: Blue = home team win; Yellow = draw; Red = away team win.

== Division 2 ==
=== Teams ===
Caernarfon Wanderers were champions in the previous season and were promoted to Division 1 along with runners-up, Bodedern Athletic. They were replaced by Gwynedd League champions, Glantraeth who were promoted to Division 2.

Locations of the Division 2 teams of the 2011–12 Welsh Alliance League

==== Grounds and locations ====
Team	Location	Ground
Amlwch Town	Amlwch	Lôn Bach
Blaenau Ffestiniog Amateur	Blaenau Ffestiniog	Cae Clyd
Connah's Quay Town	Connah's Quay	Dock Road
Gaerwen	Gaerwen	Lôn Groes
Glantraeth	Bodorgan	Trefdraeth
Greenfield	Greenfield	Bagillt Road
Halkyn United	Halkyn	Pant Newydd
Kinmel Bay Sports	Kinmel Bay	Y Morfa
Llanberis	Llanberis	Ffordd Padarn
Llandyrnog United	Llandyrnog	Cae Nant
Nantlle Vale	Penygroes	Maes Dulyn
Penmaenmawr Phoenix	Penmaenmawr	Cae Sling

=== League table ===
Pos	Team	Pld	W	D	L	GF	GA	GD	Pts	Promotion or relegation
1	Glantraeth (C, P)	22	19	1	2	97	27	+70	58	Promotion to Division 1
2	Llanberis (P)	22	17	1	4	53	28	+25	52	Promotion to Division 1
3	Kinmel Bay Sports (Note: Kinmel Bay Sports were deducted three points for unregistered player.)	22	17	3	2	73	25	+48	51	
4	Llandyrnog United	22	16	2	4	56	18	+38	50	
5	Greenfield (Note: Greenfield were deducted three points for non fulfilment of fixture.)	22	10	2	10	46	54	−8	29	
6	Penmaenmawr Phoenix	22	8	4	10	36	39	−3	28	
7	Nantlle Vale	22	7	0	15	38	62	−24	21	
8	Blaenau Ffestiniog Amateur (Note: Blaenau Ffestiniog Amateur were deducted three points for non fulfilment of fixture.)	22	7	2	13	49	73	−24	20	
9	Connah's Quay Town (Note: Connah's Quay Town were deducted three points for non fulfilment of fixture.)	22	6	3	13	27	48	−21	18	
10	Amlwch Town	22	3	9	10	33	63	−30	18	
11	Gaerwen	22	5	2	15	34	61	−27	17	
12	Halkyn United	22	2	1	19	29	73	−44	7	

Source: Welsh Alliance League, NonLeagueMatters
Rules for classification: 1) Points; 2) Goal difference; 3) Goals scored; 4) Matches won; 5) Play-off.
(C) Champions; (P) Promoted

=== Results ===
Home \ Away	AML	BFA	CQT	GAR	GLA	GRE	HAL	KIN	LNB	LLD	NAN	PHO
Amlwch Town	—	3–3	2–2	1–5	0–5	3–3	2–2	0–9	1–1	2–1	0–1	1–1
Blaenau Ffestiniog Amateur	4–4	—	4–0	3–0	1–5	3–1	4–1	3–5	0–2	1–3	4–3	0–3
Connah's Quay Town	0–1	3–0	—	1–5	1–2	0–4	4–0	0–0	0–4	0–1	3–1	0–1
Gaerwen	3–0	3–2	3–3	—	1–2	2–3	4–3	0–3	1–2	0–5	1–2	1–2
Glantraeth	2–0	9–1	7–2	9–1	—	4–0	5–2	2–1	7–0	0–2	6–0	4–1
Greenfield	2–2	5–3	1–0	4–0	0–5	—	1–0	3–6	1–5	1–2	4–1	6–1
Halkyn United	1–2	2–4	0–1	2–1	3–6	1–3	—	1–7	0–1	1–3	5–1	1–2
Kinmel Bay Sports	5–1	5–1	3–1	3–1	1–2	3–0	7–2	—	1–0	1–1	2–1	1–0
Llanberis	3–1	3–2	4–0	2–1	4–2	4–0	6–1	2–3	—	1–0	0–4	2–0
Llandyrnog United	3–1	5–1	2–0	7–0	1–2	4–1	5–1	1–1	1–2	—	3–1	3–0
Nantlle Vale	4–3	2–3	2–3	2–1	1–7	1–3	2–0	3–5	1–3	1–2	—	1–3
Penmaenmawr Phoenix	3–3	6–2	1–3	0–0	4–4	4–0	2–0	0–1	1–2	0–1	1–3	—

Source: Welsh Alliance League – Division 2 Results Grid, - NonLeagueMatters - Welsh Alliance League Division 2 - Results / Fixtures
Legend: Blue = home team win; Yellow = draw; Red = away team win.
