= 2009–10 Welsh Alliance League =

Welsh Alliance League
- Season: 2009–10
- Dates: 15 August 2009 – 15 May 2010
- Champions: Rhydymwyn
- Relegated: Blaenau Ffestiniog Amateur, Llandyrnog United, Nantlle Vale, Amlwch Town & Halkyn United
- Matches: 240
- Goals: 971 (4.05 per match)
- Biggest home win: Rhydymwyn 11–0 Amlwch Town (5 December 2009)
- Biggest away win: Halkyn United 1–12 Llandudno Junction (3 May 2010)
- Highest scoring: Halkyn United 1–12 Llandudno Junction (3 May 2010)
- All statistics correct as of 24 February 2019.

The 2009–10 Welsh Alliance League, known as the design2print Welsh Alliance League for sponsorship reasons, is the 26th season of the Welsh Alliance League, which is in the third level of the Welsh football pyramid.

The league consists of sixteen teams with the champions promoted to the Cymru Alliance and the bottom five relegated to Division 2.

The season began on 15 August 2009 and concluded on 15 May 2010 with Rhydymwyn as champions and promoted to the Cymru Alliance. Blaenau Ffestiniog Amateur, Llandyrnog United, Nantlle Vale, Amlwch Town and Halkyn United were relegated to the newly formed Welsh Alliance League Division 2.

== Teams ==
Bethesda Athletic were champions in the previous season and were promoted to the Cymru Alliance. They were replaced by Gwynedd League champions Blaenau Ffestiniog Amateur and Llandyrnog United who were relegated from the Cymru Alliance.

Locations of the teams of the 2009–10 Welsh Alliance League

=== Grounds and locations ===
Team	Location	Ground
Amlwch Town	Amlwch	Lôn Bach
Barmouth & Dyffryn United	Barmouth	Wern Mynach
Blaenau Ffestiniog Amateur	Blaenau Ffestiniog	Cae Clyd
Conwy United	Conwy	Y Morfa Stadium
Glan Conwy	Glan Conwy	Cae Ffwt
Halkyn United	Halkyn	Pant Newydd
Holywell Town	Holywell	Halkyn Road
Llanberis	Llanberis	Ffordd Padarn
Llandudno Junction F.C.	Llandudno Junction	Arriva Ground
Llandyrnog United	Llandyrnog	Cae Nant
Llanrug United	Llanrug	Eithin Duon
Llanrwst United	Llanrwst	Gwydir Park
Nantlle Vale	Penygroes	Maes Dulyn
Nefyn United	Nefyn	Cae'r Delyn
Pwllheli	Pwllheli	Leisure Centre, Recreation Road
Rhydymwyn	Rhydymwyn	Dolfechlas Road

== League table ==
Pos	Team	Pld	W	D	L	GF	GA	GD	Pts	Promotion or relegation
1	Rhydymwyn (C, P)	30	21	4	5	81	30	+51	67	Promotion to Cymru Alliance
2	Glan Conwy	30	20	3	7	88	53	+35	63	
3	Llandudno Junction	30	17	6	7	83	37	+46	57	
4	Barmouth & Dyffryn United	30	17	5	8	66	38	+28	56	
5	Pwllheli	30	15	7	8	73	37	+36	52	
6	Conwy United (Note: Conwy United were deducted three points for non fulfilment of fixture.)	30	14	11	5	71	36	+35	50	
7	Llanrwst United	30	14	7	9	53	44	+9	49	
8	Llanrug United	30	14	6	10	65	51	+14	48	
9	Llanberis	30	13	8	9	74	64	+10	47	
10	Holywell Town	30	13	7	10	72	43	+29	46	
11	Nefyn United	30	12	5	13	50	60	−10	41	
12	Blaenau Ffestiniog Amateur (R)	30	10	3	17	62	77	−15	33	Relegation to Division 2
13	Llandyrnog United (R)	30	7	7	16	42	66	−24	28	Relegation to Division 2
14	Nantlle Vale (R)	30	3	4	23	28	100	−72	13	Relegation to Division 2
15	Amlwch Town (R)	30	4	1	25	30	116	−86	13	Relegation to Division 2
16	Halkyn United (Note: Halkyn United were deducted three points for non fulfilment of fixture.) (R)	30	3	2	25	37	123	−86	8	Relegation to Division 2

Source: Welsh Alliance League
Rules for classification: 1) Points; 2) Goal difference; 3) Goals scored; 4) Matches won; 5) Play-off.
(C) Champions; (P) Promoted; (R) Relegated

== Results ==
Home \ Away	AML	BDU	BFA	CON	GLC	HAL	HOL	LNB	LNJ	LLD	LRU	LRW	NAN	NEF	PWL	RHY
Amlwch Town	—	0–4	0–3	1–5	0–2	5–1	2–5	3–2	0–5	1–7	1–2	0–5	4–1	0–1	0–5	0–3
Barmouth & Dyffryn United	2–0	—	1–2	4–2	2–4	4–0	1–1	5–0	1–2	5–0	2–1	3–0	2–1	0–0	1–1	1–3
Blaenau Ffestiniog Amateur	5–1	0–2	—	0–3	3–3	3–1	1–3	4–2	0–1	2–4	3–4	2–0	8–2	1–1	1–5	3–6
Conwy United	5–0	0–0	4–0	—	0–1	5–2	4–1	2–2	0–1	3–2	2–2	2–1	0–0	0–1	2–1	1–1
Glan Conwy	3–1	3–4	5–3	2–3	—	9–1	3–2	2–2	2–1	6–0	3–4	3–1	6–2	4–2	3–2	0–2
Halkyn United	4–1	0–4	3–4	1–3	1–2	—	1–5	3–3	1–12	2–3	3–4	0–2	3–0	3–1	0–5	1–1
Holywell Town	3–2	3–1	5–0	0–0	1–2	10–0	—	0–1	4–1	1–1	1–1	4–3	4–1	5–0	2–2	0–1
Llanberis	3–0	3–2	4–1	3–3	1–3	8–1	3–2	—	0–6	3–2	4–2	1–2	3–1	1–3	4–1	2–6
Llandudno Junction	7–0	3–1	4–3	2–2	2–0	7–0	4–1	0–0	—	3–1	1–2	0–0	4–4	3–1	2–2	1–3
Llandyrnog United	1–2	0–1	1–1	0–5	0–2	2–1	1–1	1–1	1–0	—	0–2	1–1	0–3	3–4	2–2	2–1
Llanrug United	6–1	1–3	4–0	2–2	1–3	4–2	1–3	2–2	1–2	4–0	—	3–0	5–0	0–1	0–4	1–2
Llanrwst United	3–2	1–1	1–0	2–2	2–0	5–0	2–1	2–2	2–1	2–1	2–2	—	3–0	2–1	1–3	0–3
Nantlle Vale	3–3	0–1	0–5	1–5	0–4	3–1	0–2	1–8	1–3	2–1	0–2	1–1	—	1–2	0–5	0–7
Nefyn United	4–0	3–4	4–0	0–5	2–2	3–1	1–0	1–4	2–2	2–3	1–1	3–4	2–0	—	2–4	2–0
Pwllheli	5–0	1–3	2–0	0–0	3–5	4–0	2–1	3–0	0–2	0–0	0–1	1–3	3–0	4–0	—	3–2
Rhydymwyn	11–0	3–1	1–4	3–1	5–1	1–0	1–1	0–2	2–1	3–2	3–0	1–0	3–0	3–0	0–0	—

Source: – Welsh Alliance League
Legend: Blue = home team win; Yellow = draw; Red = away team win.
