= 1995–96 Welsh Alliance League =

Welsh Alliance League
- Season: 1995–96
- Champions: Denbigh Town

The 1995–96 Welsh Alliance League was the twelfth season of the Welsh Alliance League after its establishment in 1984. The league was won by Denbigh Town.

== League table ==
Pos	Team	Pld	W	D	L	GF	GA	GD	Pts	Promotion or relegation
1	Denbigh Town (C, P)	28	20	3	5	60	30	+30	63	Promotion to Cymru Alliance
2	Prestatyn Town	28	19	3	6	70	31	+39	60	
3	Llanfairpwll	28	18	4	6	74	41	+33	58	
4	Glantraeth	28	17	2	9	66	50	+16	53	
5	Porthmadog Reserves	28	15	2	11	46	35	+11	52	
6	Locomotive Llanberis	28	15	2	11	46	35	+11	47	
7	Llandyrnog United	28	14	4	10	53	48	+5	46	
8	Llangefni Town	28	13	3	12	55	51	+4	42	
9	Bangor City Reserves	28	12	5	11	45	38	+7	41	
10	Nantlle Vale	28	9	6	13	53	56	−3	33	
11	Halkyn United	28	10	3	15	46	50	−4	33	
12	Connah's Quay Nomads Reserves	28	6	3	19	48	80	−32	21	
13	Caernarfon Town Reserves	28	6	3	19	27	60	−33	21	
14	Nefyn United	28	5	4	19	38	86	−48	19	
15	Rhyl Reserves	28	4	3	21	28	80	−52	15	

Source: Welsh Football Data Archive and Seasiders' Attic
Rules for classification: 1) Points; 2) Goal difference; 3) Goals scored; 4) Matches won; 5) Play-off.
(C) Champions; (P) Promoted
