= 1993–94 Welsh Alliance League =

Welsh Alliance League
- Season: 1993–94
- Champions: Llangefni Town
- Relegated: Conwy United Reserves; Penmaenmawr Phoenix

The 1993–94 Welsh Alliance League was the tenth season of the Welsh Alliance League after its establishment in 1984. The league was won by Llangefni Town.

== League table ==
Pos	Team	Pld	W	D	L	GF	GA	GD	Pts	Promotion or relegation
1	Llangefni Town (C)	34	25	3	6	141	51	+90	78	
2	Llanfairpwll	34	24	6	4	105	39	+66	78	
3	Rhydymwyn	34	24	6	4	75	31	+44	78	
4	Locomotive Llanberis	34	23	8	3	85	39	+46	77	
5	Nefyn United	34	17	6	11	76	66	+10	57	
6	Llanfairfechan Town	34	17	5	12	80	45	+35	56	
7	Bangor City Reserves	34	16	5	13	86	53	+33	53	
8	Nantlle Vale	34	15	7	12	81	78	+3	51	
9	Prestatyn Town	34	14	7	13	74	60	+14	49	
10	Connah's Quay Nomads Reserves	34	14	6	14	65	70	−5	48	
11	Holyhead Town	34	14	3	17	92	101	−9	45	
12	Llandyrnog United	34	12	5	17	64	67	−3	41	
13	Rhyl Reserves	34	12	4	18	61	71	−10	40	
14	St Asaph City	34	9	9	16	65	80	−15	39	
15	Y Felinheli	34	9	5	20	45	73	−28	32	
16	Llanrwst United	34	8	3	23	57	102	−45	27	
17	Conwy United Reserves (R)	34	3	3	28	42	138	−96	12	Relegation to Gwynedd League
18	Penmaenmawr Phoenix (R)	34	2	3	29	33	133	−100	9	Relegation to Gwynedd League

Source: Welsh Football Data Archive and Seasiders' Attic
Rules for classification: 1) Points; 2) Goal difference; 3) Goals scored; 4) Matches won; 5) Play-off.
(C) Champions; (R) Relegated
