= 1994–95 Welsh Alliance League =

Welsh Alliance League
- Season: 1994–95
- Champions: Rhydymwyn
- Relegated: Llanfairfechan Town; Llanrwst United; Holyhead Town; Y Felinheli

The 1994–95 Welsh Alliance League was the eleventh season of the Welsh Alliance League after its establishment in 1984. The league was won by Rhydymwyn.

== League table ==
Pos	Team	Pld	W	D	L	GF	GA	GD	Pts	Promotion or relegation
1	Rhydymwyn (C, P)	34	23	6	5	118	40	+78	75	Promotion to Cymru Alliance
2	Prestatyn Town	34	22	5	7	91	52	+39	71	
3	Glantraeth	34	19	8	7	77	52	+25	65	
4	Denbigh Town	34	18	10	6	84	45	+39	64	
5	Llanfairpwll	34	19	5	10	95	55	+40	62	
6	Llangefni Town	34	17	7	10	84	62	+22	58	
7	Bangor City Reserves	34	17	5	12	74	57	+17	56	
8	Locomotive Llanberis	34	15	10	9	64	53	+11	55	
9	Caernarfon Athletic	34	14	8	12	50	41	+9	50	
10	Connah's Quay Nomads Reserves	34	11	11	12	73	81	−8	44	
11	Rhyl Reserves	34	12	8	14	66	75	−9	44	
12	Nefyn United	34	12	7	15	69	81	−12	43	
13	Llandyrnog United	34	11	7	16	55	77	−22	40	
14	Nantlle Vale	34	10	7	17	55	80	−25	37	
15	Llanfairfechan Town (R)	34	8	8	18	49	77	−28	32	Relegation to Gwynedd League
16	Llanrwst United (R)	34	8	4	22	57	94	−37	28	Relegation to Gwynedd League
17	Holyhead Town (R)	34	6	2	26	43	126	−83	20	Relegation to Gwynedd League
18	Y Felinheli (R)	34	3	4	27	29	79	−50	13	Relegation to Gwynedd League

Source: Welsh Football Data Archive and Seasiders' Attic
Rules for classification: 1) Points; 2) Goal difference; 3) Goals scored; 4) Matches won; 5) Play-off.
(C) Champions; (P) Promoted; (R) Relegated
