= 1992–93 Welsh Alliance League =

Welsh Alliance League
- Season: 1992–93

The 1992–93 Welsh Alliance League is the 9th season of the Welsh Alliance League, which is in the third level of the Welsh football pyramid.

== League table ==
Pos	Team	Pld	W	D	L	GF	GA	GD	Pts	Promotion or relegation
1	Cemaes Bay (C, P)	32	23	6	3	113	30	+83	75	Promotion to Cymru Alliance
2	Llanfairpwll	32	22	4	6	73	42	+31	70	
3	Llangefni Town	32	21	6	5	97	45	+52	69	
4	Llandudno (P)	32	21	4	7	86	47	+39	67	Promotion to Cymru Alliance
5	Pilkingtons St Asaph City	32	18	6	8	78	57	+21	60	
6	Rhydymwyn	32	16	4	12	58	46	+12	52	
7	Nefyn United	32	13	8	11	61	64	−3	47	
8	Locomotive Llanberis	32	11	12	9	71	68	+3	45	
9	Bangor City Reserves	32	13	6	13	61	57	+4	45	
10	Nantlle Vale	32	12	6	14	74	79	−5	42	
11	Llanrwst United	32	11	5	16	58	82	−24	38	
12	Llandyrnog United	32	9	7	16	50	71	−21	34	
13	Connah's Quay Nomads Reserves	32	9	6	17	47	84	−37	33	
14	Y Felinheli	32	7	10	15	52	64	−12	31	
15	Conwy United Reserves	32	6	5	21	49	78	−29	23	
16	Rhyl Reserves	32	5	4	23	48	103	−55	19	
17	Penmaenmawr Phoenix	32	3	5	24	33	104	−71	14	

Source: Welsh Football Data Archive
Rules for classification: 1) Points; 2) Goal difference; 3) Goals scored; 4) Matches won; 5) Play-off.
(C) Champions; (P) Promoted
