= 1996–97 Welsh Alliance League =

Thirteenth season of the Welsh Alliance League of football

Welsh Alliance League
- Season: 1996–97
- Champions: Glantraeth

The 1996–97 Welsh Alliance League was the thirteenth season of the Welsh Alliance League of football after its establishment in 1984. The league was won by Glantraeth.

== League table ==
Pos	Team	Pld	W	D	L	GF	GA	GD	Pts	Promotion or relegation
1	Glantraeth (C, P)	26	20	2	4	96	29	+67	62	Promotion to Cymru Alliance
2	Llanfairpwll	26	17	6	3	62	30	+32	57	
3	Conwy United Reserves	26	13	8	5	61	39	+22	47	
4	Locomotive Llanberis	26	12	8	6	52	31	+21	44	
5	Halkyn United	26	12	7	7	53	33	+20	43	
6	Saltney Community Centre	26	12	4	10	61	54	+7	40	
7	Porthmadog Reserves	26	12	2	12	44	48	−4	38	
8	Nantlle Vale	26	10	6	10	54	59	−5	36	
9	Prestatyn Town	26	8	9	9	44	30	+14	33	
10	Rhyl Reserves	26	8	3	15	42	68	−26	27	
11	Caernarfon Town Reserves	26	4	11	11	36	53	−17	23	
12	Bangor City Reserves	26	6	5	15	38	63	−25	23	
13	Llangefni Town	26	5	3	18	23	69	−46	18	
14	Llandyrnog United	26	4	4	18	23	70	−47	16	

Source: Welsh Football Data Archive and Seasiders' Attic
Rules for classification: 1) Points; 2) Goal difference; 3) Goals scored; 4) Matches won; 5) Play-off.
(C) Champions; (P) Promoted
