= 1991–92 Welsh Alliance League =

Welsh Alliance League
- Season: 1991–92

The 1991–92 Welsh Alliance League is the 8th season of the Welsh Alliance League, which is in the third level of the Welsh football pyramid.

== League table ==
| Pos | Team | Pld | W | D | L | GF | GA | GD | Pts |
|---|---|---|---|---|---|---|---|---|---|
| 1 | Llangefni Town (C) | 28 | 21 | 3 | 4 | 84 | 27 | +57 | 66 |
| 2 | Y Felinheli | 28 | 20 | 5 | 3 | 70 | 35 | +35 | 65 |
| 3 | Bangor City Reserves | 28 | 18 | 4 | 6 | 70 | 37 | +33 | 58 |
| 4 | Cemaes Bay | 28 | 16 | 5 | 7 | 58 | 37 | +21 | 53 |
| 5 | Llandudno | 28 | 15 | 7 | 6 | 74 | 41 | +33 | 52 |
| 6 | Llanfairpwll | 28 | 12 | 5 | 11 | 60 | 51 | +9 | 41 |
| 7 | Pilkingtons St Asaph | 28 | 9 | 8 | 11 | 40 | 44 | −4 | 35 |
| 8 | Rhydymwyn | 28 | 8 | 9 | 11 | 40 | 47 | −7 | 33 |
| 9 | Conwy United Reserves | 28 | 7 | 10 | 11 | 29 | 41 | −12 | 31 |
| 10 | Connah's Quay Nomads Reserves (Note: Connah's Quay Nomads Reserves were deducted three points.) | 28 | 9 | 6 | 13 | 35 | 51 | −16 | 30 |
| 11 | Mochdre | 28 | 7 | 6 | 15 | 40 | 54 | −14 | 27 |
| 12 | Locomotive Llanberis | 28 | 7 | 5 | 16 | 29 | 62 | −33 | 26 |
| 13 | Rhyl Reserves | 28 | 7 | 3 | 18 | 28 | 65 | −37 | 24 |
| 14 | Nantlle Vale | 28 | 5 | 7 | 16 | 41 | 58 | −17 | 22 |
| 15 | Llanrwst United | 28 | 5 | 5 | 18 | 26 | 71 | −45 | 20 |

Source: Welsh Football Data Archive
Rules for classification: 1) Points; 2) Goal difference; 3) Goals scored; 4) Matches won; 5) Play-off.
(C) Champions
