= 1990–91 Welsh Alliance League =

Welsh Alliance League
- Season: 1990–91

The 1990–91 Welsh Alliance League is the 7th season of the Welsh Alliance League, which is in the third level of the Welsh football pyramid.

== League table ==
Pos	Team	Pld	W	D	L	GF	GA	GD	Pts
1	Llangefni Town (C)	28	19	6	3	102	32	+70	63
2	Caernarfon Town Reserves	28	19	3	6	84	41	+43	60
3	Bethesda Athletic	28	18	5	5	79	38	+41	59
4	Rhydymwyn	28	15	6	7	59	41	+18	51
5	Llanfairpwll	28	14	7	7	70	47	+23	49
6	Rhyl Reserves	28	14	7	7	46	34	+12	49
7	Mochdre	28	10	9	9	58	59	−1	39
8	Y Felinheli	28	9	7	12	47	52	−5	34
9	Llandudno	28	8	10	10	41	54	−13	34
10	Bangor City Reserves (Note: Bangor City Reserves were deducted three points.)	28	10	6	12	50	53	−3	33
11	Pilkingtons St Asaph (Note: Pilkingtons St Asaph were deducted three points.)	28	10	5	13	57	74	−17	32
12	Connah's Quay Nomads Reserves	28	7	6	15	52	63	−11	27
13	Llanrwst United	28	8	3	17	38	79	−41	27
14	Locomotive Llanberis	28	6	6	16	49	73	−24	24
15	Nantlle Vale	28	0	0	28	26	118	−92	0

Source: Welsh Football Data Archive
Rules for classification: 1) Points; 2) Goal difference; 3) Goals scored; 4) Matches won; 5) Play-off.
(C) Champions
