= 1998–99 Welsh Alliance League =

Welsh Alliance League
- Season: 1998–99
- Champions: Llangefni Town

The 1998–99 Welsh Alliance League was the 15th season of the Welsh Alliance League after its establishment in 1984. The league was won by Llangefni Town.

== League table ==
Pos	Team	Pld	W	D	L	GF	GA	GD	Pts	Promotion or relegation
1	Llangefni Town (C, P)	18	12	3	3	49	25	+24	39	Promotion to Cymru Alliance
2	Locomotive Llanberis	18	12	3	3	43	31	+12	39	
3	Colwyn Bay YMCA	18	11	5	2	45	22	+23	38	
4	Amlwch Town	18	10	3	5	48	36	+12	33	
5	Llanfairpwll	18	6	5	7	39	30	+9	23	
6	Rhyl Delta	18	6	3	9	37	37	0	21	
7	Halkyn United	18	6	3	9	29	40	−11	21	
8	Rhyl Reserves	18	5	5	8	28	44	−16	20	
9	Bangor City Reserves	18	5	1	12	37	50	−13	16	
10	Llandyrnog United	18	1	1	16	22	72	−50	4	

Source: Welsh Football Data Archive
Rules for classification: 1) Points; 2) Goal difference; 3) Goals scored; 4) Matches won; 5) Play-off.
(C) Champions; (P) Promoted
