= Welsh Alliance League =

Lock Stock Welsh Alliance League
- Founded: 1984
- Folded: 2020
- Country: Wales
- Divisions: 2
- Number of clubs: 31 (16 in Division 1, 15 in Division 2)
- Level on pyramid: 3–4
- Promotion to: Cymru North
- Relegation to: Gwynedd League; Vale of Clwyd and Conwy Football League
- Domestic cup: Welsh Cup
- Last champions: Division 1 – Holyhead Hotspur; Division 2 – Y Felinheli (2019–20)
- Most championships: Llangefni Town (5 titles)

The Welsh Alliance Football League (formerly the Lock Stock Welsh Alliance Football League, for sponsorship reasons) was a football league formed in 1984, and discontinued in 2020 following the reorganisation of the Welsh football pyramid for the 2020–21 season.

Division 1 was part of the third level of the Welsh football league system in North Wales.

== Member clubs for the final 2019–20 season ==
As confirmation from the league on 25 June 2019.

=== Division 1 ===
Club Name	Stadium	2018–19 position
Blaenau Ffestiniog Amateur	Cae Clyd, Blaenau Ffestiniog	2nd (Promoted from Division 2 for 2019–20 season)
Bodedern Athletic	Cae Ty Cristion, Village Hall Bodedern	2nd
Denbigh Town	Central Park, Denbigh	15th (Relegated from Cymru Alliance for 2019–20 season)
Glan Conwy	Cae Ffwt, Glan Conwy	1st (Promoted from Division 2 for 2019–20 season)
Greenfield	Bagillt Road, Greenfield	4th
Holyhead Hotspur	The New Stadium, Holyhead	16th (Relegated from Cymru Alliance for 2019–20 season)
Llanberis	Ffordd Padarn, Llanberis	10th
Llandudno Albion	Ffordd Dwyfor, Llandudno	3rd
Llandyrnog United	Cae Nant, Llandyrnog	13th
Llanrug United	Eithin Duon, Llanrug	5th
Llanrwst United	Gwydir Park, Llanrwst	11th
Mynydd Llandegai	Mynydd Llandygai	12th
Nantlle Vale	Maes Dulyn, Penygroes	6th
Penrhyndeudraeth	Maes Y Parc, Penrhyndeudraeth	8th
Prestatyn Sports	Gronant Playing Fields, Prestatyn	7th
St Asaph City	Roe Plas, St Asaph	9th

=== Division 2 ===
Club name	Stadium	2018–19 position
Amlwch Town	Lôn Bach, Amlwch	15th
Aberffraw	Ty Croes, Aberffraw	5th
Barmouth & Dyffryn United	Wern Mynach, Barmouth	14th (Relegated from Division 1 for 2019–20 season)
Gaerwen	Lon Groes, Gaerwen	11th
Gwalchmai	Maes Meurig, Gwalchmai	2nd (Promoted from Gwynedd League for 2019–20 season)
Holyhead Town	Millbank Sports Field, Holyhead	12th
Kinmel Bay	Cader Avenue, Kinmel Bay	7th
Llandudno Amateurs	The Oval, Llandudno	1st (Promoted from Vale of Clwyd and Conwy Football League Premier Division for 2019–20 season)
Llandudno Junction	The Flyover, Llandudno Junction	15th (Relegated from Division 1 for 2019–20 season)
Llannefydd	Llannefydd	3rd
Mochdre Sports	Swan Road, Mochdre	14th
Penmaenmawr Phoenix	Cae Sling, Penmaenmawr	9th
Pentraeth	Bryniau Field, Pentraeth	10th
Pwllheli	Leisure Centre, Recreation Road, Pwllheli	4th
Y Felinheli	Cae Selio, Bangor Street, Y Felinheli	8th

== Past Champions ==
Season	Divisional	
1984–85	Conwy United	
1985–86	Conwy United	
1986–87	Bethesda Athletic	
1987–88	Llanfairpwll	
1988–89	Flint Town United	
1989–90	Porthmadog	
1990–91	Llangefni Town	
1991–92	Llangefni Town	
1992–93	Cemaes Bay	
1993–94	Llangefni Town	
1994–95	Rhydymwyn	
1995–96	Denbigh Town	
1996–97	Glantraeth	
1997–98	Holyhead Hotspur	
1998–99	Llangefni Town	
1999–2000	Halkyn United	
2000–01	Llanfairpwll	
2001–02	Amlwch Town	
2002–03	Glantraeth	
2003–04	Rhyl Reserves	
2004–05	Bodedern	
2005–06	Prestatyn Town	
2006–07	Denbigh Town	
2007–08	Bethesda Athletic	
2008–09	Bethesda Athletic	
2009–10	Rhydymwyn	
Season	Division 1	Division 2
2010–11	Conwy United	Caernarfon Wanderers
2011–12	Holyhead Hotspur	Glantraeth
2012–13	Caernarfon Town	Llandyrnog United
2013–14	Denbigh Town	Penrhyndeudraeth
2014–15	Holywell Town	St Asaph City
2015–16	Trearddur Bay	Greenfield
2016–17	Glantraeth	Llandudno Albion
2017–18	Conwy Borough	Prestatyn Sports
2018–19	Llangefni Town	Glan Conwy
2019–20	Holyhead Hotspur	Y Felinheli
