= 1997–98 Welsh Alliance League =

Welsh Alliance League
- Season: 1997–98
- Champions: Holyhead Hotspur

The 1997–98 Welsh Alliance League was the fourteenth season of the Welsh Alliance League after its establishment in 1984. The league was won by Holyhead Hotspur.

== League table ==
Pos	Team	Pld	W	D	L	GF	GA	GD	Pts	Promotion or relegation
1	Holyhead Hotspur (C, P)	26	23	1	2	102	32	+70	70	Promotion to Cymru Alliance
2	Colwyn Bay YMCA	26	17	3	6	71	41	+30	54	
3	Locomotive Llanberis	26	15	5	6	71	50	+21	50	
4	Halkyn United	26	15	2	9	60	40	+20	47	
5	Llangefni United	26	12	6	8	73	46	+27	42	
6	Prestatyn Town	26	13	3	10	50	34	+16	42	
7	Bangor City Reserves	26	12	4	10	72	53	+19	40	
8	Nantlle Vale	26	11	5	10	41	49	−8	38	
9	Llanfairpwll	26	8	5	13	38	51	−13	29	
10	Caernarfon Town Reserves	26	9	1	16	46	61	−15	28	
11	Saltney Community Centre	26	7	7	12	40	60	−20	28	
12	Rhyl Reserves	26	6	5	15	33	63	−30	23	
13	Conwy United Reserves	26	5	2	19	48	108	−60	17	
14	Llandyrnog United	26	2	5	19	29	86	−57	11	

Source: Welsh Football Data Archive and Seasiders' Attic
Rules for classification: 1) Points; 2) Goal difference; 3) Goals scored; 4) Matches won; 5) Play-off.
(C) Champions; (P) Promoted
