= 1999–2000 Welsh Alliance League =

Welsh Alliance League
- Season: 1999–2000
- Champions: Halkyn United
- Relegated: Llandyrnog United

The 1999–2000 Welsh Alliance League was the sixteenth season of the Welsh Alliance League after its establishment in 1984. The league was won by Halkyn United.

== League table ==
Pos	Team	Pld	W	D	L	GF	GA	GD	Pts	Promotion or relegation
1	Halkyn United (C, P)	24	19	5	0	70	23	+47	62	Promotion to Cymru Alliance
2	Colwyn Bay YMCA	24	15	6	3	49	26	+23	51	
3	Llanfairpwll	24	14	6	4	30	46	−16	48	
4	Glan Conwy	24	13	4	7	74	33	+41	43	
5	Llandudno Junction	24	11	4	9	67	51	+16	37	
6	Bangor City Reserves	24	10	6	8	65	52	+13	36	
7	Prestatyn Town	24	11	2	11	48	54	−6	35	
8	Locomotive Llanberis	24	10	4	10	59	47	+12	34	
9	Amlwch Town	24	10	2	12	76	53	+23	32	
10	Rhyl Athletic	24	8	4	12	51	59	−8	28	
11	Rhyl Delta	24	6	4	14	42	68	−26	22	
12	Penmaenmawr Phoenix	24	2	8	14	37	71	−34	14	
13	Llandyrnog United (R)	24	1	1	22	22	147	−125	4	Relegation to Clwyd League Premier Division

Source: Welsh Football Data Archive and Seasiders' Attic
Rules for classification: 1) Points; 2) Goal difference; 3) Goals scored; 4) Matches won; 5) Play-off.
(C) Champions; (P) Promoted; (R) Relegated
