= 1984–85 Welsh Alliance League =

Welsh Alliance League
- Season: 1984–85

The 1984–85 Welsh Alliance League is the 1st season of the Welsh Alliance League, which is in the third level of the Welsh football pyramid.

== League table ==
Pos	Team	Pld	W	D	L	GF	GA	GD	Pts
1	Conwy United (C)	28	21	3	4	107	34	+73	45
2	Bethesda Athletic	28	19	5	4	72	19	+53	43
3	Y Felinheli	28	20	2	6	72	39	+33	42
4	Porthmadog	28	17	5	6	59	37	+22	39
5	Llanfairpwll	28	15	6	7	63	39	+24	36
6	Pwllheli & District	28	14	3	11	68	52	+16	31
7	Caernarfon Town Reserves	28	12	5	11	55	50	+5	29
8	Llanrwst United	28	11	6	11	49	51	−2	28
9	Bangor City Reserves	28	12	3	13	65	53	+12	27
10	Blaenau Ffestiniog	28	10	6	12	68	82	−14	26
11	Rhos United	28	6	9	13	40	67	−27	21
12	Llandudno Amateurs	28	6	8	14	35	52	−17	20
13	Rhyl Reserves	28	7	6	15	45	72	−27	20
14	U.C.N.W. Bangor	28	2	3	23	35	109	−74	7
15	Colwyn Bay Reserves	28	2	2	24	30	106	−76	6

Source: Welsh Football Data Archive
Rules for classification: 1) Points; 2) Goal difference; 3) Goals scored; 4) Matches won; 5) Play-off.
(C) Champions
