= 1985–86 Welsh Alliance League =

Welsh Alliance League
- Season: 1985–86

The 1985–86 Welsh Alliance League is the 2nd season of the Welsh Alliance League, which is in the third level of the Welsh football pyramid.

== League table ==
Pos	Team	Pld	W	D	L	GF	GA	GD	Pts
1	Conwy United (C)	30	21	6	3	88	31	+57	48
2	Bethesda Athletic	30	21	3	6	77	28	+49	45
3	Caernarfon Town Reserves	30	19	4	7	80	36	+44	42
4	Llanfairpwll	30	16	10	4	57	28	+29	42
5	Y Felinheli	30	15	7	8	58	45	+13	37
6	Holyhead United	30	13	5	12	64	58	+6	31
7	Blaenau Ffestiniog	30	11	9	10	62	59	+3	31
8	Pwllheli & District	30	12	5	13	63	62	+1	29
9	Rhyl Reserves	30	10	7	13	39	50	−11	27
10	Bangor City Reserves	30	9	8	13	48	63	−15	26
11	Rhos United	30	9	8	13	48	63	−15	26
12	Llanrwst United	30	8	9	13	53	72	−19	25
13	Llandudno Amateurs	30	6	8	16	36	69	−33	20
14	Colwyn Bay Reserves	30	6	7	17	30	60	−30	19
15	Mochdre	30	6	6	18	47	71	−24	18
16	Porthmadog	30	4	6	20	34	67	−33	14

Source: Welsh Football Data Archive
Rules for classification: 1) Points; 2) Goal difference; 3) Goals scored; 4) Matches won; 5) Play-off.
(C) Champions
