= 1989–90 Welsh Alliance League =

Welsh Alliance League
- Season: 1989–90

The 1989–90 Welsh Alliance League is the 6th season of the Welsh Alliance League, which is in the third level of the Welsh football pyramid.

== League table ==
Pos	Team	Pld	W	D	L	GF	GA	GD	Pts	Promotion or relegation
1	Porthmadog (C, P)	34	26	4	4	98	26	+72	82	Promotion to Cymru Alliance
2	Bangor City Reserves	34	23	10	1	90	30	+60	79	
3	Connah's Quay Nomads (P)	34	23	4	7	89	39	+50	73	Promotion to Cymru Alliance
4	Nantlle Vale	34	20	7	7	81	47	+34	67	
5	Bethesda Athletic	34	18	6	10	89	53	+36	60	
6	Locomotive Llanberis	34	17	8	9	89	72	+17	59	
7	Flint Town United (P)	34	16	5	13	61	54	+7	53	Promotion to Cymru Alliance
8	Llanfairpwll	34	16	3	15	70	66	+4	51	
9	Conwy United (P)	34	14	6	14	70	61	+9	48	Promotion to Cymru Alliance
10	Llandudno	34	13	6	15	76	74	+2	45	
11	Y Felinheli	34	12	8	14	56	68	−12	44	
12	Rhyl Reserves (Note: Rhyl Reserves were deducted three points.)	34	12	6	16	45	61	−16	39	
13	Mochdre	34	9	7	18	49	82	−33	34	
14	Holywell Town (Note: Holywell Town were deducted three points.) (P)	34	8	8	18	44	68	−24	29	Promotion to Cymru Alliance
15	Pilkingtons St Asaph	34	7	7	20	53	78	−25	28	
16	Llanrwst United	34	6	9	19	46	85	−39	27	
17	Colwyn Bay Reserves	34	5	5	24	43	108	−65	20	
18	Caernarfon Town Reserves	34	4	5	25	38	115	−77	17	

Source: Welsh Football Data Archive
Rules for classification: 1) Points; 2) Goal difference; 3) Goals scored; 4) Matches won; 5) Play-off.
(C) Champions; (P) Promoted
