= 1988–89 Welsh Alliance League =

Welsh Alliance League
- Season: 1988–89

The 1988–89 Welsh Alliance League is the 5th season of the Welsh Alliance League, which is in the third level of the Welsh football pyramid.

== League table ==
Pos	Team	Pld	W	D	L	GF	GA	GD	Pts
1	Flint Town United (C)	32	23	4	5	72	26	+46	73
2	Rhyl Reserves	32	22	4	6	67	36	+31	70
3	Nantlle Vale	32	20	6	6	85	42	+43	66
4	Porthmadog	32	16	10	6	85	60	+25	58
5	Holywell Town	32	16	3	13	65	64	+1	51
6	Connah's Quay Nomads	32	15	5	12	58	42	+16	50
7	Llanfairpwll	32	15	4	13	54	51	+3	49
8	Bethesda Athletic	32	12	10	10	57	56	+1	46
9	Y Felinheli	32	12	8	12	48	55	−7	44
10	Conwy United	32	11	10	11	58	55	+3	43
11	Bangor City Reserves (Note: Bangor City Reserves were deducted two points.)	32	12	6	14	57	57	0	40
12	Llanrwst United	32	12	3	17	55	69	−14	39
13	Caernarfon Town Reserves	32	10	7	15	47	49	−2	37
14	Mochdre	32	9	8	15	50	66	−16	35
15	Llandudno	32	7	2	23	35	68	−33	23
16	Pilkingtons St Asaph	32	4	9	19	37	76	−39	21
17	Colwyn Bay Reserves	32	5	3	24	42	100	−58	18

Source: Welsh Football Data Archive
Rules for classification: 1) Points; 2) Goal difference; 3) Goals scored; 4) Matches won; 5) Play-off.
(C) Champions
