= 1987–88 Welsh Alliance League =

Welsh Alliance League
- Season: 1987–88

The 1987–88 Welsh Alliance League is the 4th season of the Welsh Alliance League, which is in the third level of the Welsh football pyramid.

== League table ==
Pos	Team	Pld	W	D	L	GF	GA	GD	Pts
1	Llanfairpwll (C)	30	23	4	3	68	14	+54	50
2	Bethesda Athletic	30	20	9	1	69	21	+48	49
3	Porthmadog	30	21	7	2	75	29	+46	49
4	Connah's Quay Nomads	30	18	5	7	86	36	+50	41
5	Caernarfon Town Reserves	30	16	6	8	74	47	+27	38
6	Pilkingtons St Asaph	30	13	6	11	55	53	+2	32
7	Llanrwst United	30	14	3	13	60	62	−2	31
8	Y Felinheli	30	13	5	12	54	72	−18	31
9	Colwyn Bay Reserves	30	10	5	15	55	66	−11	25
10	Mochdre	30	9	4	17	48	63	−15	22
11	Rhos United	30	9	4	17	31	64	−33	22
12	Conwy United	30	8	5	17	57	76	−19	21
13	Flint Town United	30	7	7	16	44	60	−16	21
14	Llandudno	30	7	3	20	39	66	−27	17
15	Bangor City Reserves (Note: Bangor City Reserves were deducted two points.)	30	6	7	17	39	78	−39	17
16	Rhyl Reserves (Note: Rhyl Reserves were deducted one point.)	30	4	6	20	26	73	−47	13

Source: Welsh Football Data Archive
Rules for classification: 1) Points; 2) Goal difference; 3) Goals scored; 4) Matches won; 5) Play-off.
(C) Champions
