= 1986–87 Welsh Alliance League =

Welsh Alliance League
- Season: 1986–87

The 1986–87 Welsh Alliance League is the 3rd season of the Welsh Alliance League, which is in the third level of the Welsh football pyramid.

== League table ==
Pos	Team	Pld	W	D	L	GF	GA	GD	Pts
1	Bethesda Athletic (C)	26	20	5	1	80	19	+61	45
2	Llanfairpwll	26	20	4	2	70	17	+53	44
3	Caernarfon Town Reserves	26	15	7	4	59	29	+30	37
4	Pilkingtons St Asaph	26	14	7	5	63	33	+30	35
5	Bangor City Reserves	26	14	4	8	69	32	+37	32
6	Porthmadog	26	12	2	12	56	55	+1	26
7	Rhyl Reserves	26	10	5	11	51	52	−1	25
8	Conwy United	26	9	5	12	38	55	−17	23
9	Llanrwst United	26	8	4	14	41	68	−27	20
10	Rhos United	26	4	9	13	35	42	−7	17
11	Y Felinheli	26	6	5	15	36	66	−30	17
12	Colwyn Bay Reserves	26	6	5	15	25	60	−35	17
13	Mochdre	26	7	2	17	39	63	−24	16
14	Llandudno Amateurs	26	3	4	19	36	79	−43	10

Source: Welsh Football Data Archive
Rules for classification: 1) Points; 2) Goal difference; 3) Goals scored; 4) Matches won; 5) Play-off.
(C) Champions
