= Rhydymwyn F.C. =

Association Football Club in Wales

Coordinates: 53°11′40.2″N 3°11′27.7″W

Rhydymwyn
- Full name: Rhydymwyn Football Club
- Nickname: Rhyd
- Founded: 1911
- Ground: The Print Place Stadium; Rhydymwyn
- League: North East Wales Division One
- 2024–25: North East Wales Championship, 3rd of 15 (promoted)
- Website: http://www.pitchero.com/clubs/rhydymwynfootballclub/
Home colours	Away colours

Rhydymwyn F.C. is a football club from Rhydymwyn, Wales, a village in the Alyn valley about 4 km upstream from Mold. They play in the North East Wales Division One. Their home ground is Dolfechlas Road.

== History ==
Rhydymwyn Football Club was founded in 1911 and played in the local Halkyn and Clwyd Leagues. They remained in those leagues until they moved up to the Welsh Alliance League in 1990. They immediately consolidated their progress by finishing fourth in their first season, and also reaching the final of the Cookson Cup. The following year, they finished in sixth place, and also reached the final of the North Wales Coast FA Challenge Cup, but lost 2–1 to the then HFS Loans League side, Colwyn Bay. They finished fourth again in 1993, and also won the Alves Cup. The following year saw them third on goal difference, after a three-way tie with Llangefni Town and Llanfairpwll. The 1994–95 season saw them capture the Welsh Alliance League title, and gain promotion to the Cymru Alliance. They also won the FAW Trophy, beating Taffs Well 1–0 in the final played at Caersws. The 1995–96 season saw them finish a respectable fifth in the Cymru Alliance League. They also retained the FAW Trophy, beating Penrhyncoch at Newtown. In 1996–97 they finished second in the league behind Rhayader Town, before taking the title in the 1997–98 season. Various reasons prevented the club from being promoted to the League of Wales.

The club has progressed, not only on the field but off it as well. They obtained a £75,000 pavilion funded by Delyn Borough Council, and also received a £26,000 Sport Lot Award to extend their function room. Much of their progress was down to manager Ken Knowles and a committee made up of committed local people. When Ken Knowles retired after eleven seasons in charge, the club decided to appoint a player/manager from within their ranks. However the club then had to resign from the Cymru Alliance, due mainly to a lack of players. After returning to the Welsh Alliance League, the club was successful again. In the 2003–04 season they reached the finals of both the Barritt and Cookson Cups. They won the Cookson Cup but narrowly lost the Barritt Cup, under the caretaker manager, Phil Eaton.

The following season saw them strongly contest the league championship, only to lose by one point to eventual champions, Bodedern. They also reached the final of the FAW Trophy, losing 3–1 to Swansea-based side West End at Rhayader. Since those successes, the club struggled under a different manager, with mid-table finishes within the Welsh Alliance. Success returned to the club in the 2007–08 season when they defeated Barmouth & Dyffryn United to win the Barritt Cup for the first time at Farrar Road, Bangor. The 2008–09 season saw a big improvement in the Welsh Alliance when they finished runners-up behind Bethesda Athletic. The momentum continued in 2009–10 season and the club stayed in pole position, winning eight out of the first nine games winning promotion back to the Huws Gray Alliance with an overall record of 21 wins, 4 draws and only 5 defeats. However the first season back in the Huws Gray Alliance was unsuccessful: they finished in 14th place with only 18 points, and at the end of the season the club dropped out of the Huws Gray Alliance. The club found themselves back in the third tier of Welsh football, but this time in the Welsh National League (Wrexham Area) rather than the Welsh Alliance, due to boundary changes. The club appointed Daniel Seamarks as their new manager, and it was his task to rebuild the team. Next season Rhydymwyn finished in a highly respectable second position, and were promoted back to the Huws Gray Alliance, as champions FC Cefn chose to withdraw their application for promotion. But in 2012-13 Rhydymwyn only came 14th in the Huws Gray Alliance, with 28 points. This time the club knew that they would be safe, as only two clubs were going to gain promotion and Rhyl were going to be promoted to the Welsh Premier as champions of the Huws Gray Alliance. Rhydymwyn had been higher up the table earlier in the season and their league position slipped as security was guaranteed.

2014-15 goalkeeper Andrew Ruscoe signed from Cefn Druids and became captain. He later became their Player of the Season before moving back to Brickfield Rangers. It was a poor season for Rhydymwyn: they did not win a game all season and were relegated form the Huws Gray Cymru Alliance (Tier 2 of Welsh Football). Next season the club could not raise a team, and the club folded. In 2016 the club reformed and entered the Welsh National League (Wrexham Area).

The club played in the Ardal Leagues North West, which is at Tier 3 of the Welsh football pyramid, before resigning from the league in September 2022. The following season they reformed and joined the North East Wales Football League in the Tier 5 Championship Division.

== Honours ==
Leagues

- Cymru Alliance
  - Champions: 1997–98
  - Runners-up: 1998–99
- Welsh Alliance League
  - Champions: 1994–95, 2009–10
- Clwyd Football League
  - Premier Division – Champions: 2000–01
  - Division One – Runners-up: 1981–82
  - Division Two – Champions: 1979–80
  - Division Three – Runners-up: 1977–78

Cups

- FAW Welsh Trophy – Winners: 1994–95, 1995–96
- FAW Welsh Trophy – Runners-up: 2004–05
- North Wales Coast FA Junior Challenge Cup – Winners: 1983–84
- NWCFA Challenge Cup – Runners-up: 1991–92
- Alves Cup – Winners: 1992–93
- Barrit Cup – Winners: 2007–08
- Barrit Cup – Runners-up: 2003–04
- Cookson Cup – Winners: 2003–04
- Cookson Cup – Runners-up: 1990–91
- Halkyn League Challenge Cup – Winners: 1968–69, 1969–70

== Backroom staff ==
  - First Team Manager - Anthony Weaver
  - Assistant Manager - James Duffy
  - Goalkeeping Coach - John Weaver
  - First Team Coach - Stew Tarran
  - Groundskeeper - Les Buxton
