= Bangor University F.C. =

Association football club in Wales

Bangor University Football Club
- Full name: Bangor University Football Club
- Nickname(s): The Students "Green Army"
- Ground: Treborth or Nantporth; Bangor; Gwynedd
- League: BUCS Football League; Northern 3A
- 2018–19: 2nd
Home colours	Away colours

Bangor University Football Club are a Welsh football club based in Bangor, Gwynedd. They compete in the British Universities and Colleges Sport (BUCS) competition in the Aldi Northern 4A League.

They have also previously competed in the Gwynedd League.

In the BUCS competitions they have numerous teams - and currently fields a first, second, third & Women's team in this competition. The first team compete in the BUCS Aldi Northern 4A League after winning the 4A league in the 2012–13 season. The second compete in the BUCS Aldi Northern 7a League. The Women's team now compete in the BUCS Mars Women's 3A league after winning the 3B league in the 2012–2013 season.

Each year the first teams from Prifysgol Bangor University and Aberystwyth University compete in a highly contested Varsity match as one of many sport fixtures between the two Welsh universities. Most recently in 2025, Bangor absolutely embarrassed Aberystwyth in a devastatingly dominant performance which may stop the opposition playing ever again as the away team were sent packing after a heavy 3-0 loss.

The club is the largest in the University's Athletic Union.

The club's crest and colours are those of the university

== Honours ==
- North Gwynedd & YNS Non Sunday League Division One Winner: 2008–09
- BUCS Mars Northern 4C League Winner – 2012–13
- BUCS Women's Mars 3B League Winner 2012–13
- Eryri Shield Winner – 2003–04
- Eryri Shield Runner Up – 1991–92, 2005–06, 2009–10
- Cwpan Gwynedd Runner up – 2003–04, 2012–13
