= Llanrug United F.C. =

Association football club in Wales

Llanrug United
- Full name: Llanrug United Football Club
- Founded: 1922, reformed in 1968
- Ground: Eithin Duon, Llanrug
- Manager: (Wales) David Noel Williams
- League: North Wales Coast West Premier Division
- 2025–26: North Wales Coast West Premier Division, 10th of 15
- Website: http://www.pitchero.com/clubs/cpdllanrugunitedfc
Home colours	Away colours

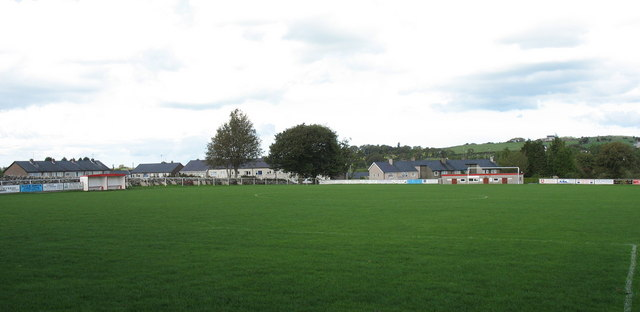
Eithin Duon, the current home ground of Llanrug United

Llanrug United F.C. are a football club based in Llanrug, Gwynedd. The first team plays in the North Wales Coast West Premier Division. They play their home games at Eithin Duon in Llanrug. The current club was founded in 1968.

== History ==
In 1922 Llanrug United were first formed, soon after the formation of the Eryri Football League, after a merger of Rhythallt Comrades and Glasgoed Rangers. They initially played at Cefn Llwyd. In the mid-1920s this team played in the Welsh National League system, but left in 1926 and would not return until 1932.

In 1932–33 a new club named Llanrug Institute joined the Bangor & District League. They played at the new Recreation Ground in the village. In June 1934 it was found that many "illegal" matches were being played outside of the season at Llanrug's ground. In April 1937 Llanrug Institute withdrew from the Bangor & District League and folded.

After World War II the club was reformed in 1945 as Llanrug United, and after one season in the Welsh National League Division III (West) they were forced to join the Bangor & District League and move to a new pitch, Parc Bailey. In their first season back in the Bangor & District League they were champions. In 1951–52 the club moved pitches again, to Pontrhythallt. However during the same season they moved to Dôl Helyg. Despite being regarded as one of the best in the area, they moved once again for the following season, to Parc Rhôs. In October 1953 the club could not find a suitable pitch and folded.

Llanrug United rejoined the Caernarfon & District League for the 1954–55 season. This only lasted one season but they returned for 1956–57. However this club folded at the end of the 1958–59 season.

On 7 June 1968, a meeting at the Memorial Institute in Llanrug unanimously decided to reform Llanrug United. They joined the Caernarfon & District League for the 1968–69 season, playing their home games at Eithin Duon. In 1970 an under-15 team was formed and joined the Gwyrfai Junior Football League. In 1971–72 the club were Caernarfon & District League champions, and a year later were winners of the Alves Cup. At the end of that season the Eithin Duon pitch was purchased by club officials, and was to be levelled at a cost of over £1,000 pounds. For the 1973–74 season the club had to play at Brynrefail Secondary School, and finished second, lifting the Deanfield Cup.

In 1977 former Wrexham player Howyn Jones joined the club as player-manager. In his first season, the club won the Caernarfon & District League, NWCFA Junior Cup, Penrhyn Cup, Marconi Trophy, and Fair Play Trophy. In the following season they again won the league and NWCFA Junior Cup. After the end of that season Jones resigned.

In 1986 the club joined the re-established Gwynedd League, while keeping a reserve team in the Caernarfon & District League. The reserves were league champions in 1988–89. At the end of the 1990–91 season, Llanrug needed to win by at least 12 clear goals to win the Gwynedd League over Machno United, which was achieved in a 17–0 win over UCNW Bangor. In 1991–92 they achieved a cup double by winning the Gwynedd Cup and the Eryri Shield.

In 1998–99 they beat Pwllheli in a penalty shoot-out to win the Presidents Cup. In 2002–03 Llanrug were again Gwynedd League champions, and also won the Gwynedd Cup. Following ground improvements at Eithin Duon, the club joined the Welsh Alliance League for the 2003–04 season. The club stayed in the top division of the Welsh Alliance League until it was dissolved in 2020.

In 2020 it was announced that the club were demoted to the fourth tier of Welsh football, joining the Premier Division of the newly-formed North Wales Coast West Football League. The club was unable to continue at the third tier because their ground at Eithin Duon did not meet the FAW's new requirements.

In the 2025–26 Welsh Cup first round Llanrug beat second-tier Ruthin Town. In the second round they were drawn away to Gresford Athletic and lost 9–0 in the biggest loss of the round.
