= Mynydd Llandygai =

Coordinates: 53.168°N 4.089°W

Mynydd Llandygai: Welsh: Mynydd Llandygái
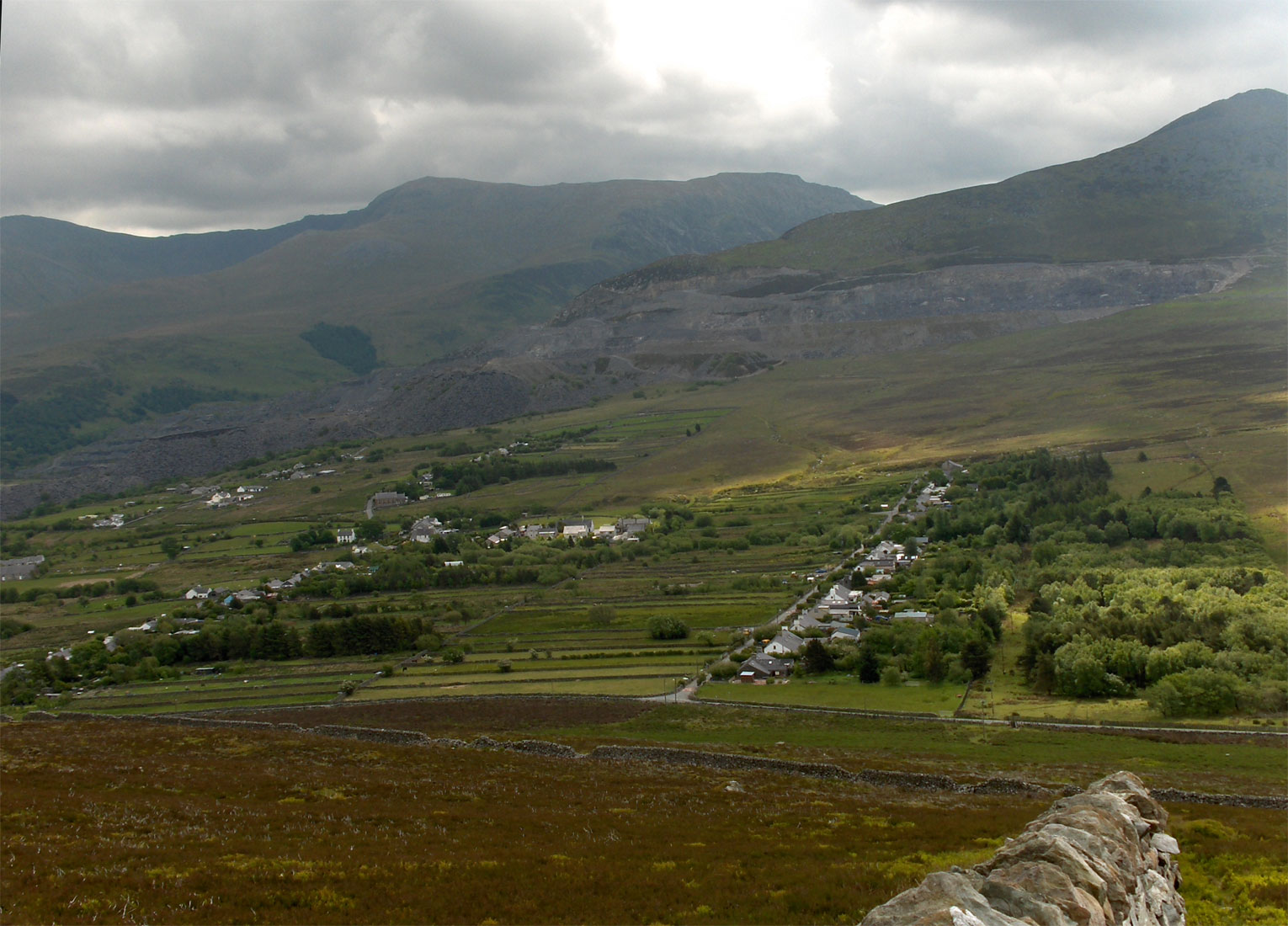
- The village of Mynydd Llandygai from Moelyci, showing the two rows of houses, and the slate quarries beyond

- Location within Gwynedd
- OS grid reference: SH603655
- Community: Llandygai
- Principal area: Gwynedd
- Country: Wales
- Sovereign state: United Kingdom
- Post town: BANGOR
- Postcode district: LL57
- Dialling code: 01248
- Police: North Wales
- Fire: North Wales
- Ambulance: Welsh
- UK Parliament: Bangor Aberconwy
- Senedd Cymru – Welsh Parliament: Arfon

Mynydd Llandygai (also spelled Mynydd Llandegai; Welsh: Mynydd Llandygái, [ˌmənɨðˌɬandəˈɡai]; 'Llandygai mountain') is a small, partly forested hill in Gwynedd, North Wales. It forms the start of the Glyderau ridge.

It is also the name of the quarry village at the base of the hill situated at the edge of Snowdonia National Park at grid reference SH603655. The village lies at about 1,000 feet (300 m) above sea level and gets strong winds and above average rainfall. Many of the houses are spread along long roads rather than clustered around a point, giving the village a somewhat decentralised feel. However the village is distinguished by two parallel rows of semi-detached quarrymen's cottages constructed during the 19th century for workers of Penrhyn Quarry, which mined slate. The first mention of housing on the site can be found in the census of 1841. Each of the houses was provided with an area of land (approximately one acre (0.40 ha)) sufficient to feed the family. This arrangement is clearly visible on the map of the area. This can be contrasted with the situation in the South Wales coalfields or in the industrial Midlands where no such provision was made for the workers.

Originally named Douglas Hill, the name was changed in the 1930s after the inhabitants decided that they did not want to associate with the name Douglas, namely part of the Penrhyn family surname. (See Baron Penrhyn.)

Physically the village has changed little since it was originally built.

The area to the south is mountainous and there are a number of slate and stone quarries in the vicinity.
