= Greenfield F.C. =

Association football club in Wales

- Full name: Greenfield Football Club
- Founded: 2005
- Ground: Bagillt Road, Greenfield
- Capacity: 500
- Chairman: Shaun McGilloway
- Manager: Scott Beck
- League: North East Wales Division One
- 2025–26: North East Wales Division One, 8th of 12
- Website: http://www.pitchero.com/clubs/greenfieldfc
Home colours	Away colours

Greenfield Football Club is a football club representing the Flintshire village of Greenfield in Wales. They play their home games at The Old Courtaulds Pitch, located by the A548 road at Greenfield and the first team is in the North East Wales Division One.

== History ==
The club started life in the Clwyd Football League Division Two in the 2005–06 season, formed by Barry Ainsworth, who had previously run a youth section in the village in the 1990s. Ainsworth managed the club for six years after the club's formation, overseeing promotion as Clwyd Division One champions in 2007–08 with a perfect record of 24 straight wins and into the Welsh Alliance League in 2011–12. The club's next management team, Scott Beck and Tony Hogan, guided the club to the Welsh Alliance Division Two championship in 2015–16.

The club joined the newly formed North East Wales Football League in 2020 as a Premier Division club and after the first planned season was cancelled due to the Coronavirus pandemic, the club were inaugural champions in the 2021–22 season.

== Honours ==
=== Leagues ===
- North East Wales Football League Premier Division – Champions: 2021–22
- Welsh Alliance League Division Two – Champions: 2015–16
- Clwyd Football League Division One – Champions: 2007–08

=== Cups ===
- North Wales Coast FA Intermediate Cup – Winners: 2008–09
- Clwyd Football League Premier Division Cup – Winners: 2008–09
- Halkyn Cup – Winners: 2005–06
- REM Jones Cup – Winners: 2006–07
- North East Wales FA Junior Cup – Runners-up: 2025–26
