= Nefyn United F.C. =

Association football club in Wales

- Full name: Clwb Pêl-droed Nefyn Unedig/ Nefyn United Football Club
- Nicknames: Y Penwaig, The Herring
- Founded: 1932–39 Nefyn Celts – 1945 Nefyn Unedig
- Ground: Cae'r Delyn, Nefyn
- Capacity: 100
- Chairman: Catrin Huws
- Manager: Steve Jones, Alan Jones, Michael Evans Jones
- League: North Wales Coast West Premier Division
- 2025–26: North Wales Coast West Premier Division, 1st of 15
- Website: http://www.pitchero.com/clubs/nefynunitedfc
Home colours	Away colours

Nefyn United F.C. is a football club from Nefyn in Wales. They play in the North Wales Coast West Premier Division.

== History ==
Nefyn United had been a regular fixture in the Welsh Alliance League, finishing around the mid-table for nine seasons after gaining promotion from the Gwynedd League in 2005. However, disaster struck before the 2014–15 season when manager Geraint Evans resigned from his post to become station officer at the local fire station, leaving the club without a manager for the upcoming season. Unable to find a suitable replacement in time, the club decided to move back to the Gwynedd League, now two tiers below where they had been competing because of the introduction of the Welsh Alliance League Division 2 in 2010.

The club finished the 2014–15 season in the Gwynedd League in sixth place.

In 2017–18 Nefyn reached three finals, losing in extra time to Gwalchmai 2–1 in the Safeflue Cup and losing to Bro Goronwy in the Bob Owen Memorial Cup. In the NWCFA Junior Cup they beat Bontnewydd after extra time 4–2.

== Honours ==
- North Wales Coast West Football League
  - Champions: – 2025–26
  - Runners-up: – 2024–25
- NWCFA Intermediate Cup
  - Winners: – 2025–26
- Gwynedd League
  - Runners-up: – 2003–04, 2004–05
- Caernarfon & District League
  - Champions: 1952–53, 1953–54, 1954–55, 1986–87, 1999–2000
- North Wales Coast West Football League Premier Cup
  - Runners-up: 2025–26

== League history ==
Season	League	Level	P 6	W 5	D 1	L 0	F	A	Pts 15	Position 1	Welsh Cup
2002–03	Gwynedd League Premier Division	4	24	13	3	8	75	57	42	6th of 13	
2003–04	Gwynedd League Premier Division	4	26	17	4	5	68	31	55	2nd of 14	
2004–05	Gwynedd League (Note: Gwynedd League consolidated into a single division)	4	28	19	7	2	99	38	64	2nd of 15	
2005–06	Welsh Alliance League	3	30	16	2	12	60	57	50	6th of 16	R3
2006–07	Welsh Alliance League	3	28	9	2	17	41	61	29	11th of 15	R1
2007–08	Welsh Alliance League	3	28	10	4	14	48	68	31 (Note: 3-point deduction)	10th of 15	R3
2008–09	Welsh Alliance League	3	32	16	6	10	65	58	54	7th of 17	R1
2009–10	Welsh Alliance League	3	30	12	5	13	50	59	41	11th of 16	R1
2010–11	Welsh Alliance League Division 1 (Note: Welsh Alliance League split into two divisions)	3	30	10	7	13	40	54	37	8th of 16	R2
2011–12	Welsh Alliance League Division 1	3	30	7	4	19	36	70	25	13th of 16	2Q
2012–13	Welsh Alliance League Division 1	3	28	8	4	16	40	81	28	13th of 15	2Q
2013–14	Welsh Alliance League Division 1	3	28	9	1	18	34	73	28	11th of 15	R2
2014–15	Gwynedd League (Note: Joined after withdrawal from the Welsh Alliance League)	5	28	13	4	11	71	54	43	6th of 15	1Q
2015–16	Gwynedd League	5	24	14	2	8	70	38	44	5th of 13	
2016–17	Gwynedd League	5	22	10	4	8	59	59	34	6th of 12	
2017–18	Gwynedd League	5	22	11	4	7	58	34	37	6th of 12	
2018–19	Gwynedd League	5	20	11	2	7	50	39	35	5th of 11	
2019–20	Gwynedd League	5	14 (Note: Shortened season due to COVID-19 pandemic)	10	2	2	47	18	32	4th of 15	R1
2021–22	North Wales Coast West League Premier Division (Note: Joined after dissolution of Gwynedd League)	4	28	16	4	8	83	44	52	5th of 15	1Q
2022–23	North Wales Coast West League Premier Division	4	28	14	5	9	61	41	47	7th of 15	2Q
2023–24	North Wales Coast West League Premier Division	4	28	20	1	7	83	55	61	3rd of 15	2Q
2024–25	North Wales Coast West League Premier Division	4	26	17	5	4	66	32	56	2nd of 16	2Q
