= Glantraeth F.C. =

Association football club in Wales

Coordinates: 53.202604°N 4.379538°W

Glantraeth
- Full name: Glantraeth Football Club
- Nickname: Glan
- Founded: 1984
- Ground: Trefdraeth, Bodorgan (63 seats)
- Chairman: Gareth Evans
- Manager: Lee Jones
- League: North Wales Coast West Division One
- 2025–26: North Wales Coast West Premier Division, (withdrew)
Home colours	Away colours

Glantraeth Football Club (Welsh: Clwb Pêl Droed Glantraeth) is a football team, based on the island of Anglesey, Wales. They play in the North Wales Coast West Division One.

Formed in 1984, the club began competing in the Anglesey League before progressing into the Gwynedd League and the Welsh Alliance League. The club achieved its highest ever finish during the 2005–06 season by winning the Cymru Alliance but were denied promotion to the Welsh Premier League, the highest tier of Welsh football, as their ground did not meet league requirements. They resigned from the Cymru Alliance four years later and reformed several tiers below. After reaching the First Division of the Welsh Alliance League and winning the division in 2017, the club were again forced to resign their position after being unable to find sufficient players. They reformed again for the 2018–19 season, returning to the Gwynedd League.

== History ==
The club was founded in 1984 and established a base on a piece of land provided by a local resident. They entered Division Two of the Anglesey League and finished as runners-up in the 1985–86 season. The following season, the club won promotion to the First Division of the Anglesey League and reached their first cup final in the Dargie Cup. In 1990, the club gained promotion to the Gwynedd League and, four years later, reached the Welsh Alliance League for the first time.

In the 1996–97 season, Glantraeth finished as champions of the Welsh Alliance League, winning 20 of their 26 league matches and scoring 96 goals. They achieved consecutive fifth-placed finishes during their first two seasons before ending the 1999–2000 season as runners-up to Oswestry Town. In 2001, the club merged with fellow Cymru Alliance side Llangefni Town to form Llangefni Glantraeth. The new side remained in the Cymru Alliance and recorded a second and fourth-placed finish. However, the two clubs decided to split, with Llangefni remaining in the Cymru Alliance and Glantraeth dropping into the Welsh Alliance League to reform. In their first season back, Glantraeth finished as champions of the Welsh Alliance and returned to the Cymru Alliance.

After finishing as runners-up again in the 2004–05 season, Glantraeth achieved their highest ever finish by winning the Cymru Alliance in 2006. However, the club were denied promotion to the Welsh Premier League, the top tier of Welsh football as their ground did not meet league requirements and they were unable to finance the necessary improvements. The club struggled to match their achievements in the following seasons and, in 2009, after finishing 16th the club resigned their position in the Cymru Alliance and did not field a team for the 2009–10 season. During their break, Glantraeth undertook an improvement in facilities at their ground and applied to the Football Association of Wales (FAW) to return, being placed in the Gwynedd League. They achieved consecutive promotions to reach the First Division of the Welsh Alliance League. In February 2016, actress Naomi Watts agreed to become the honorary president of the club, replacing Sir George Meyrick. Watts had lived on the island of Anglesey as a child, her maternal grandparents had owned a farm in the village of Llangristiolus near the club's hometown of Bodorgan, before moving to Australia in her teens.

In the 2016–17 season, Glantraeth won a league and cup double by finishing as champions of the First Division and winning the Cookson Cup however, their promotion success proved disastrous as the club were unable to meet new ground requirements for entry into the Cymru Alliance, claiming the cost of renovating their ground would be "absurd". As such, they rejected promotion which led the majority of the club's players to move on, leading the team to resign their position in the league after they were unable to find enough players to start the new season. After missing the 2017–18 season, Glantraeth reformed and entered a team in the Gwynedd League for the 2018–19 season.

The club was chosen to host several matches during the 2019 Inter Games Football Tournament.

In September 2025 the club withdrew from the North Wales Coast West Football League, which they had played in since 2021.

== Honours ==
As of June 2018

=== League ===
Anglesey League Division One

- Runners-up: 1987–88

Anglesey League Division Two

- Runners-up: 1986–86

Cymru Alliance League

- Winners: 2005–06
- Runners-up: 2000–01, 2004–05

Gwynedd League

- Winners: 1993–94
- Runners-up: 2010–11

Welsh Alliance League

- Winners: 1996–97

Welsh Alliance League Division One

- Winners: 2016–17

Welsh Alliance League Division Two

- Winners: 2011–12

=== Cup ===
Barritt Cup

- Finalists: 1994–95, 2002–03

Cookson Cup

- Winners: 2015–16, 2016–17
- Finalists: 2002–03

Cymru Alliance League Challenge Cup

- Winners: 2005–06

Dargie Cup

- Finalists: 1986–87

Elias Cup

- Finalists: 1988–89

Eryri Shield

- Winners: 1992–93

Gwynedd League Cup

- Winners: 1993–94, 2010–11

Gwynedd Shield

- Winners: 2010–11

North Wales Coast FA Challenge Cup

- Finalists: 1999–2000, 2011–12

North Wales Coast FA Intermediate Cup

- Winners: 2010–11

Welsh Alliance Division Two League Cup

- Winners: 2011–12

== Records ==
- Record victory: 19–0 vs Glan Conwy (2002–03)
- Record defeat: 0–7 vs Holywell Town (2012–13)
