= Pen-y-groes, Gwynedd =

Coordinates: 53°03′11″N 4°17′00″W

Pen-y-groes
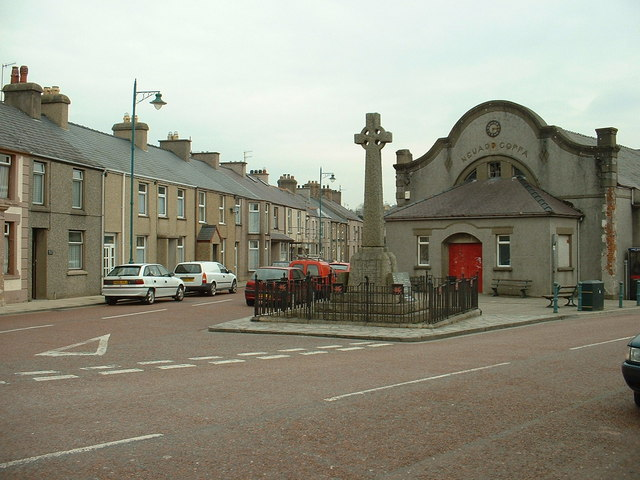
- Pen-y-groes War Memorial

- Location within Gwynedd
- Population: 1,793 (2011)
- OS grid reference: SH470531
- Community: Llanllyfni
- Principal area: Gwynedd
- Preserved county: Gwynedd
- Country: Wales
- Sovereign state: United Kingdom
- Post town: CAERNARFON
- Postcode district: LL54
- Dialling code: 01286
- Police: North Wales
- Fire: North Wales
- Ambulance: Welsh
- UK Parliament: Dwyfor Meirionnydd
- Senedd Cymru – Welsh Parliament: Arfon

Pen-y-groes (Welsh pronunciation: [ˌpɛnəˈɡroːɨs], also spelled as Penygroes) is a village in Gwynedd, Wales. The village is located to the south of Caernarfon, and north of Porthmadog, by the A487 road. Pen-y-groes' population stands at 1,793 at the 2011 census, of which 88% are Welsh-speaking, making it one of the most predominantly Welsh-speaking areas of the country. The population of Llanllyfni community, which includes Pen-y-groes and Llanllyfni village, which practically adjoins Pen-y-groes, plus Talysarn, is 4,135 according to the 2011 census.

== Etymology ==
The name of the village is derived from pen "end" + y "[of] the" + croes "cross[roads]", referring to the crossing at the village of the roads from Carmel, Rhyd-ddu and Pontllyfni with the main Caernarfon–Porthmadog road.

== History and amenities ==
Pen-y-groes is located in the former slate quarrying area of Dyffryn Nantlle, although most of the quarries are now closed down. However, it remains the valley's main shopping and administrative centre. Its biggest employer was a paper-converting plant producing hand tissues and toilet rolls.

It lies in the community of Llanllyfni, and nearby villages are Llanllyfni, Carmel, Talysarn, Nantlle, Tanrallt, Nebo, and Groeslon.

It is the site of Nantlle Vale F.C., which used to be managed by the professional wrestler and promoter Orig Williams, better known by his ring name of "El Bandito". The club's former social complex has in recent years been demolished, and a new police station now occupies the site.

The cycle path Lôn Eifion passes near the village, following the route of the former Carnarvonshire Railway, which ran from Caernarfon to Afon Wen and closed in 1964.

Pen-y-groes lies by the edge of Lord Newborough's former estate at Glynllifon, from which several medieval legends have emanated. The character Lleu Llaw Gyffes, who features in the ages-old legends of the Mabinogi (sometimes inaccurately referred to as the Mabinogion), was said to have lived in the area. The Iron Age hillfort at Dinas Dinlleu and the village of Nantlle—originally spelt as Nantlleu—are said to have been named after him.

== Education ==
Ysgol Bro Lleu provides Welsh-medium primary education to the village and the surrounding area. As of 2023, there are 199 pupils on roll at the school; 78 per cent of statutory school age pupils speak Welsh at home.

Ysgol Dyffryn Nantlle provides secondary education in the village. At least 80 percent of subjects (apart from English and Welsh) are taught only through the medium of Welsh to all pupils. 401 pupils were enrolled at the school in 2023; 82.5 per cent of pupils speak Welsh at home.

== Governance ==
Pen-y-groes is the name of the electoral ward which covers the village and elects a county councillor to Gwynedd Council. It is coterminous with the Llanllyfni community ward of Pen-y-groes.

== Notable people ==
- Bryn Fôn (born 1954), Welsh actor and singer-songwriter
- Dafydd Glyn Jones (born 1941), Welsh scholar and lexicographer; went to school in Pen-y-groes
- R. Williams Parry (1884–1956), notable 20th-century poet writing in Welsh
- Bill Pendergast (1915–2001), Welsh professional footballer
- Gareth Thomas (born 1954), politician and MP for Clwyd West, 1997 to 2005
- Sage Todz, Welsh language rapper
- Betty Williams (born 1944), politician and former MP for Conwy from 1997 to 2010; went to school in Pen-y-groes
- Owain Fôn Williams (born 1987), Welsh international goalkeeper, coach and painter
