= Amlwch Town F.C. =

Association football club in Wales

Amlwch Town
- Full name: Amlwch Town Football Club
- Nickname(s): Town
- Founded: 1897
- Ground: Lôn Bach, Amlwch
- Manager: Ioan Dafydd Evans
- League: North Wales Coast West Division One
- 2023–24: North Wales Coast West Premier Division, 15th of 15 (relegated)
- Website: http://amlwchtownfc.co.uk/
Home colours	Away colours

Amlwch Town Football Club is a football team, playing in Amlwch on the island of Anglesey in the North Wales Coast West Division One.

Founded in 1897, the club enjoyed post-war success in the Anglesey League where they were champions for five successive seasons between 1947 and 1951.

Their highest standard of football ever was two seasons spent in the Cymru Alliance from 2002 to 2004, but were relegated at the end of their second season. They then decided to drop straight past the next level Welsh Alliance to return to the more local Anglesey League, which they won at the second attempt in 2005–06. Their first season back in the Gwynedd League in 2006–07 saw them finish as runners-up behind Barmouth & Dyffryn United. This was enough to gain promotion back to the Welsh Alliance as Barmouth & Dyffryn United's ground did not meet the necessary criteria.

In the 1998–99 season Welsh international and former Manchester United and Everton player, Mickey Thomas made several appearances for the club.

The club attracted national attention in 2024 when then-manager Robert Williams-Jones punched a linesman during a non-league match at the Lon Bach ground. On 6 January 2025, Williams-Jones was sentenced to 24 weeks in prison, suspended for 12 months.

== Club officials ==
- President:
- Chairman: Owain Hughes
- Vice Chairman:Alan Carter

== Club honours ==
- Anglesey League Winners: 1946–47, 1947–48
- Anglesey League & Megan Cup Winners: 1948–49
- Anglesey League & North Wales Coast FA Junior Challenge Cup : 1949–50
- Anglesey League Winners: 1950–51
- North Wales Coast FA Junior Challenge Cup: 1955–56
- Elias Cup Winners: 1964–65
- Megan Cup Winners: 1966–67
- Dargie Cup Winners: 1967–68
- Dargie Cup & Megan Cup Winners: 1968–69
- Anglesey League & Dargie Cup Winners: 1970–71
- Anglesey League Winners: 1971–72
- JW Lees Shield Winners: 1985–86
- Dargie Cup Winners: 1989–90
- Anglesey League, North Wales Coast FA Junior Challenge Cup & Megan Cup Winners: 1996–97
- Gwynedd League, Cwpan Gwynedd & Eryri Shield Winners: 1997–98
- Alves Cup Winners: 1998–99
- Elias Cup Winners: 1999–00
- Welsh Alliance League & Alves Cup Winners: 2001–02
- Dargie Cup & AEEU Cup Winners: 2004–05
- Anglesey League & Elias Cup Winners: 2005–06
