= Pwllheli F.C. =

Association football club in Wales

Coordinates: 52°52′53″N 4°25′33″W

Pwllheli
- Full name: Clwb Pêl Droed Pwllheli Football Club
- Founded: November 1879
- Ground: Leisure Centre, Recreation Road, Pwllheli
- Capacity: 200
- Manager: Carl Jones
- League: Ardal NW League
- 2025–26: Ardal NW League, 11th of 16
- Website: http://www.pitchero.com/clubs/cpdpwllhelifc
Home colours	Away colours

Pwllheli F.C. (Welsh: Clwb Pêl Droed Pwllheli) is a football club based in Pwllheli in North Wales. They play in the Ardal NW League. Their home ground is at the Recreation Ground.

== History ==
The club was formed in November 1879. The club were captained by William Davies in their first ever game against Porthmadog.
