= Blaenau Ffestiniog Amateur F.C. =

Association football club in Wales

Coordinates: 52°58′50.8″N 3°55′40.7″W

Blaenau Ffestiniog Amateur (Amaturiaid Blaenau Ffestiniog)
- Full name: Blaenau Ffestiniog Amateur Football Club (Clwb Pêl-droed Amaturiaid Blaenau Ffestiniog)
- Nickname: The Quarrymen
- Founded: 1980
- Ground: Cae Clyd, Blaenau Ffestiniog
- Chairman: John Campbell
- Manager: Gerallt Michelmore
- League: North Wales Coast West Premier Division
- 2025–26: North Wales Coast West Premier Division, 4th of 15
Home colours

Blaenau Ffestiniog Amateur Football Club (Clwb Pêl-droed Amaturiaid Blaenau Ffestiniog) are a Welsh football club from Blaenau Ffestiniog, Gwynedd. Founded in 1980, they are nicknamed "The Quarrymen" due to the slate mining history around the town.

== History ==
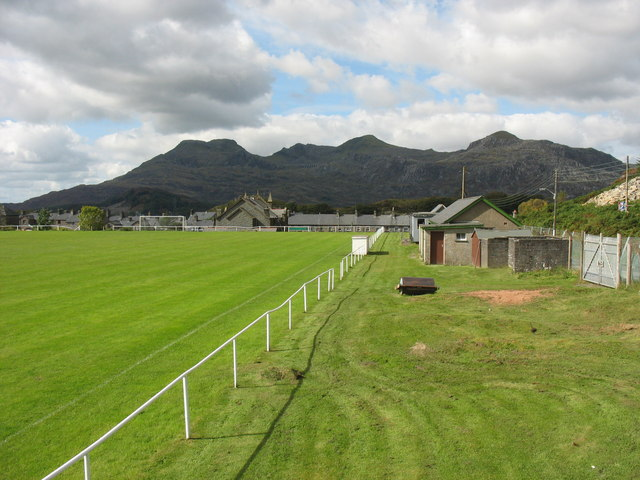
Cae Clyd

In the 2008–09 season they won the Gwynedd League championship for the first time. Brian Vaughan was managing, having taken over as the manager at the beginning of the season.

The early 2020s saw them join the North Wales Coast East Football League 2024–25 season saw them swap from the East Division to the North Wales Coast West Football League Division One and they finished the season as champions, gaining promotion to the Premier Division.
