= Halkyn United F.C. =

Association football club in Wales

Halkyn United
- Full name: Halkyn United Football Club
- Nickname: Warriors
- Founded: 1945
- Dissolved: 2018
- Ground: Pant Newydd, Halkyn
- Capacity: 500 (75 seated)
- League: North East Wales Division Three
- 2017–18: Clwyd East Football League (resigned)
Home colours	Away colours

Halkyn United Football Club are a Welsh football club representing the Flintshire villages of Halkyn, Pentre Halkyn and Rhosesmor, near Mold, in Wales. The club was founded in 1945. The club plays in the North East Wales Division Three having reformed for the 2026–27 season, having last played during the 2017–18 season.

== History ==
Halkyn United Football Club was formed in 1945 in the aftermath of the Second World War and became founder members of the old Halkyn Mountain League, which was a forerunner to the Clwyd League. It is believed that during this period of the club's history the club played their home games on various grounds within the village of Pentre Halkyn.

The earliest honours won by Halkyn were the Mountain League in 1956 and the League Cup in 1959. After years playing in the Mountain League, the club joined the Clwyd League in 1975 and played their home matches in Pentre Halkyn on a field owned by the council. This field was adjacent to the Village Park in Pentre Halkyn, the changing facilities being the nearby community centre.

Many of the current long-serving officials involved with the club's modern-day success started to arrive at the club in the late 1980s and the 1990s. In the 1992–93 season under manager George Thelwell the club won the Clwyd League Division One title and with it promotion to the Premier League. In the first season in the Premier League despite finishing midway in the league United won both the Presidents Cup and the Arrows Cup. Further progress up the pyramid system was achieved, and in the season 1994–95 Halkyn achieved promotion as champions from the Clwyd League to the Welsh Alliance League. Success continued with the prestigious Barritt Cup making its way to Halkyn in the season 1995–96 and the Cookson Cup the following season.

Throughout their four years in the Welsh Alliance the club competed well and made steady progress. In the 1997–98 season a fourth-place finish was achieved behind runaway champions Holyhead Hotspur. However, the following season brought the club down to earth with an indifferent season culminating in a mid-table finish. The 1999–2000 season proved the most successful in the club's history, as they won the Tyn Lon Rover Welsh Alliance by a clear 11 points whilst remaining unbeaten in the League. Added to that the club progressed to the fourth round of the Welsh Cup including an away victory at League of Wales outfit Haverfordwest County.

The club managed to stay in the Cymru Alliance for a few seasons, but the 2005–06 season proved too much of a challenge for them, and they finished bottom of the table. This ensured the club would be relegated, and would play their football in the Welsh Alliance for the 2006–07 season. Promotion to the Cymru Alliance meant work was required at Pant Newydd to bring the ground up to the required standard. A makeshift stand was built and changes made to the rooms and the showers. More changes are in the pipeline as Halkyn strive to continue building the football club.

In the 2015–16 season the club resigned their place in the Welsh Alliance League Division 2. They then joined the Clwyd East Football League for the subsequent season.

In the 2016–17 season the club resigned their place in the Clwyd East Football League after 20 games, with all results expunged from the league's records.

For the 2017–18 season the club were renamed Halkyn Mountain Football Club and were again granted a place in the Clwyd East Football League. The club again withdrew from the league, this time in August 2018 before any matches were played.

The club continued to run junior teams after its men's team folded. In March 2026 it was announced that the men's team would be reforming for the 2026–27 season, when they expect to join the North East Wales Football League Division Three. In June their place was confirmed in the league.

== Recent history ==
Season	League	Position	P	W	D	L	F	A	Pts
1999–00	Welsh Alliance League	1st	24	19	5	0	–	–	62
2000–01	Cymru Alliance	9th	30	11	6	13	47	55	39
2001–02	Cymru Alliance	7th	34	17	7	10	58	43	58
2002–03	Cymru Alliance	7th	32	14	9	9	56	57	51
2003–04	Cymru Alliance	8th	32	15	5	12	64	57	50
2004–05	Cymru Alliance	11th	34	13	6	15	71	74	45
2005–06	Cymru Alliance	18th (R)	34	5	8	21	50	86	23
2006–07	Welsh Alliance League Division 1	14th	28	6	2	20	28	74	20
2007–08	Welsh Alliance League Division 1	14th	28	06	07	15	37	68	25
2008–09	Welsh Alliance League Division 1	11th	32	15	03	14	79	79	45
2009–10	Welsh Alliance League Division 1	16th (R)	30	03	02	25	37	123	08
2010–11	Welsh Alliance League Division 2	9th	20	05	03	12	30	51	18
2011–12	Welsh Alliance League Division 2	12th	22	02	01	19	29	73	07
2012–13	Welsh Alliance League Division 2	8th	24	08	06	10	45	48	30
2013–14	Welsh Alliance League Division 2	6th	22	12	02	10	67	57	38
2014–15	Welsh Alliance League Division 2	11th	30	09	03	18	59	82	30
2015-16	Welsh Alliance League Division 2	Resigned from the League							
2016-17	Clwyd East Football League	8th	26	11	02	13	76	89	35
2017-18	Clwyd East Football League	Resigned from the League							
2018-19	Clwyd East Football League	Resigned from the League							

Key: P = Played; W = Won; D = Drawn; L = Lost; F = Goals for; A = Goals against; Pts = Points
Current league position as of 14 March 2015

== First team honours ==
=== League ===
- Halkyn Mountain League
  - Champions: 1955–56
- Clwyd Football League Division 1
  - Champions: 1992–93
- Clwyd Football League Premier
  - Champions: 1994–95
- Welsh Alliance League
  - Champions: 1999–2000

=== Cups ===
- Halkyn Mountain League Cup
  - Winners: 1958–59, 1974–75
- Halkyn Mountain League Challenge Cup
  - Winners: 1972–73, 1974–75
- Arrows Cup
  - Winners: 1993–94
- Clwyd League President Cup
  - Winners: 1993–94
- Mawddach Barritt Trophy
  - Winners: 1995–96
- Cookson Cup
  - Winners: 1996–97

== Reserve team honours ==
=== Cups ===
- Halkyn Cup
  - Winners: 2013–14
