= Llangefni Town F.C. =

Association football club in Wales

Coordinates: 53.2619°N 4.3001°W

CPD Tref Llangefni Town FC
- Full name: Clwb Pel-Droed Tref Llangefni Town Football Club
- Nicknames: The Town, The Dazzlers, Cefni
- Founded: 1897; 129 years ago
- Ground: Cae Bob Parry, Llangefni
- Capacity: 4,500
- Chairman: Alwyn Jones
- Manager: James Saxon
- League: Ardal NW League
- 2025–26: Ardal NW League, 9th of 16
- Website: http://www.llangefnifc.co.uk/
| Home colours | Away colours |

Llangefni Town Football Club (Welsh: Clwb Pêl-droed Tref Llangefni) is a Welsh football team based in Llangefni on Anglesey. They play in the Ardal NW League.

Llangefni Town competed for a single season in the Welsh Premier League in the 2007–08 season and are former members of now defunct Cymru Alliance between 1999 and 2012.

== Stadium ==
- Isgraig (1897–2000)
- Cae Bob Parry (2000–present)

The club's ground was chosen to host several matches during the 2019 Inter Games Football Tournament. There were ground improvements after winning the Welsh Alliance League in 2019, to prepare for life in tier 2.
