= Llandyrnog United F.C. =

Association football club in Wales

Llandyrnog United
- Full name: Llandyrnog United Football Club
- Nickname: Dyrny
- Founded: 1975; 51 years ago
- Ground: Cae Nant, Llandyrnog
- Capacity: 1,000 (covered seating for 150, covered standing for 200)
- Coordinates: 53.17451478434465, -3.33438510607153
- Chairman: Nick Hailes
- Manager: Stephen Jones
- League: North Wales Coast East Division One
- 2025–25: North Wales Coast East One, 3rd of 9
- Website: http://www.pitchero.com/clubs/llandyrnogunitedfootballclub/
Home colours	Away colours

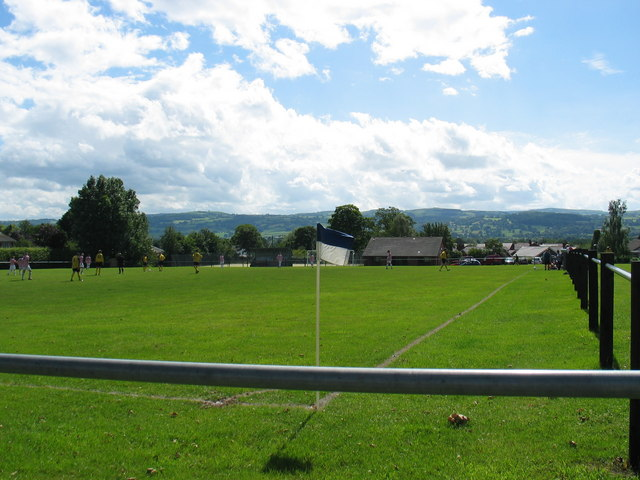
Cae Nant

Llandyrnog United F.C. is a football team that was founded in 1975 in Llandyrnog, near Denbigh, Wales. They play in the North Wales Coast East Division One.

The club was formed after a few villagers met in the Golden Lion Public House. The golden lion on the club crest is in recognition of this. They were admitted into the Clwyd League Division 4 gaining promotion at the first attempt. Llandyrnog remained in Division 2/3 until the end of 1978/79 when they were promoted as runners up. The club spent over a decade in Division 1 until 1990/91 when they gained promotion to the Premier Division. Llandyrnog were crowned champions at their first attempt and promoted to the Sealink Welsh Alliance. After a lengthy spell in this league Llandyrnog were relegated back to the Clwyd League Premier Division where they stayed until 2002/03 until manager John James was appointed and the club gained promotion back to the Welsh Alliance. Only one season was spent in this league as the Club gained back to back promotions into the Cymru Alliance for the first time in its history.

They stayed in the Cymru Alliance until the end of the 2008–09 season where they finished bottom of the table 20 points from safety.

== Club honours ==
=== Leagues ===
- Clwyd Football League Premier – Champions: 1991–92
- Clwyd Football League – Champions: 1987–88
- Clwyd Football League Division 4 – Champions: 1975–76

=== Cups ===
- Clwyd Cup – Winners: 1989–90
- Clwyd Premier Cup – Winners: 1991–92
- Mackenzie Jones League Cup – Winners: 2002–03
- NWCFA Junior Cup – Runners-up: 2025–26
