= Nantlle Vale F.C. =

Association football club in Wales

Coordinates: 53°3′5.1″N 4°16′48.9″W

Nantlle Vale
- Full name: Nantlle Vale Football Club
- Ground: Maes Dulyn, Penygroes
- Chairman: Kim Warrington-Davies
- Manager: Gavin Edwards
- League: North Wales Coast West Premier Division
- 2025–26: North Wales Coast West Premier Division, 3rd of 15
- Website: http://www.pitchero.com/clubs/nantllevalefc
Home colours	Away colours

Nantlle Vale F.C (Welsh: Clwb Pêl-droed Dyffryn Nantlle) are a Welsh football club from Penygroes, near Caernarfon, formed around 1920. They play in the North Wales Coast West Premier Division.

== History ==
They were notorious in the early 1970s for their very robust style of play, when the team featured noted hard men such as player-manager Orig Williams – a professional wrestler by trade, who fought under the stage name El Bandito – and defender Idris Evans, better known by his nickname of Tarw Nefyn (the Nefyn Bull). Williams was once famously sent off in only the third minute of a match at Bangor City. His autobiography Cario'r Ddraig was published in the 1990s.

== Honours ==
=== League ===
- Caernarfon & District League:
  - Champions (1): 2000–01
- Gwynedd League:
  - Champions (1): 1987–88
- Gwyrfai League:
  - Champions (1): 1924
- Welsh League Division One (North)
  - Champions (1): 1959–60
- Welsh League Second Division (East)
  - Champions (2)

=== Cups ===
- Amateur Cup:
  - Winners (2): 1973–74, 1974–75
- Barritt Cup:
  - Winners (1): 2001–02
- Challenge Cup:
  - Winners (1)
- Cooks Cup:
  - Winners (1): 1938–39
- Cookson Cup:
  - Winners (1): 1959–60
- Intermediate Cup:
  - Winners (1): 1975–76
- Lleyn & District Cup:
  - Winners (1): 1938–39
- Moorings Cup:
  - Winners (3): 1989–90, 1999–2000, 2000–01
- Penrhyn Cup:
  - Winners (1): 1973–74
- President Cup:
  - Winners (1): 2002–03
- Snowdonia Shield:
  - Winners (1): 1987–88
- North Wales Coast FA Junior Challenge Cup:
  - Winners (1): 2000–01
- North Wales Coast West Football League Premier Cup:
  - Winners: 2025–26

Source: Nantlle Vale Football Club – The Official Nantlle Valley Website, Welsh Alliance League
