= Llanberis F.C. =

Association football club in Wales

Coordinates: 53.119567°N 4.124707°W

Llanberis
- Full name: Llanberis Football Club (Clwb Pêl-Droed Llanberis)
- Nickname: Y Darans
- Founded: 1890; 136 years ago
- Ground: Ffordd Padarn; Llanberis
- Capacity: 500 (standing)
- Chairman: Eurwyn Thomas
- Manager: Carwyn Jones
- League: North Wales Coast West Premier Division
- 2025–26: North Wales Coast West Premier Division, 11th of 15
- Website: http://www.pitchero.com/clubs/clwbpeldroedllanberis
Home colours

Llanberis F.C. (Welsh: Clwb Pêl-droed Llanberis) are a Welsh football club play in the North Wales Coast West Premier Division. Their ground is located in the centre of the village. Their nickname is Y Darans.

== History ==
Llanberis F.C. were founded in 1890. Dr. Robert Herbert Mills-Roberts, a former Preston North End and Wales goalkeeper who graduated as a doctor in July 1887. A few years later he took over the running of the Dinorwic Slate Quarry Hospital, and it was during this time he became one of the founding fathers of Llanberis F.C.

Llanberis F.C. were known as Llanberis United from the early 1900s until 1920. In 1980 the club changed its name to Locomotive Llanberis due to sponsorship by the Snowdon Mountain Railway.

After finishing runners-up in the Gwynedd League, Locomotive Llanberis joined the Welsh Alliance League in 1989. The club changed its name back to Llanberis F.C. in 2004. In April 2019 it was reported that they may not be able to continue at the third tier as their pitch was too small to meet the new requirements of the Football Association of Wales. For the 2020–21 season their time in the Welsh Alliance League came to an end, as they entered tier 4 in the newly formed North Wales Coast West Football League Premier Division.

In 2024 the club won their first trophy since 2001 by winning the Snowdonia Fire and Security Cup.

Nicknames used to refer to the club throughout its history include: Llanber, Y Blac and Amber, Y Teigars, Locomotives, Y Loco, and Y Darans.
