= Llanrwst United F.C. =

Association football club in Wales

Coordinates: 53°8′5″N 3°47′49″W

Llanrwst United
- Full name: Llanrwst United Football Club
- Nickname: The Rwsters
- Founded: 1983; 43 years ago
- Ground: Gwydir Park; Llanrwst
- Chairman: Chris Williams
- Manager: Leighton Griffiths (2024-present)
- League: Ardal NW League
- 2025–26: Ardal NW League, 8th of 16
- Website: http://www.llanrwstutdfc.co.uk/
Home colours

Llanrwst United (Welsh: Clwb Pêl-Droed Llanrwst Unedig) is a Welsh football club based in Llanrwst in the Conwy Valley. They play in the Ardal NW League. The club colours are red and white.

== History ==
Llanrwst United were founded in 1983 after Llanrwst Town and Llanrwst Athletic merged.

In the 2012–13 season the club won the Barritt Cup.

== Ground ==
Llanrwst play at the Gwydir Park ground, close to the bridge in the centre of the town.
