= C.P.D. Llanfairpwll F.C. =

Association football club in Wales

Coordinates: 53°13′28″N 4°12′33″W

CPD Llanfairpwll FC
- Full name: Clwb Pêl Droed Llanfairpwllgwyngyllgogerychwyrndrobwllllantysiliogogogoch Football Club
- Short name: Llanfairpwll
- Ground: Maes Eilian (Eilian's Field); Llanfairpwllgwyngyll
- Capacity: 1,000
- Chairman: Samantha Jones-Smith
- Manager: Rees Roberts
- League: North Wales Coast West Division One
- 2025–26: North Wales Coast West Division One, 7th of 12
- Website: http://www.pitchero.com/clubs/llanfairpwllfc/
Home colours	Away colours	Third colours

Clwb Pêl Droed Llanfairpwllgwyngyllgogerychwyrndrobwllllantysiliogogogoch Football Club, commonly referred to by a shortened version as CPD Llanfairpwll FC, is a football team based in Llanfairpwllgwyngyll, that plays in the North Wales Coast West Division One.

== Club history ==
A team named Llanfair Rovers appears as early as 1897. In 1899 they entered the North Wales Coast League and had a good season, playing 23 matches; winning 10, drawing 5 and losing 8.

They have been champions of the Welsh Alliance League in the 1987–88 season and the 2000–01 season. They have been runners-up four times. They also played Football League opposition in the Welsh Cup in the form of Shrewsbury Town in 1987, losing 1–0 at Caernarfon Town.

The name of the football club is also known to be the longest football club name in the world.

In September 2023 La Liga announced they are the new shirt sponsor of the team, signing a one-year deal. In 2025 they agreed a three year shirt sponsorship deal with Mastercard.

=== New ground ===
The club had played at Y Gors until moving to Maes Eilian for the 2008–09 season.

== Honours ==
League

- Welsh Alliance League
  - Champions (2): 1987–88, 2000–01
  - Runners-up (4): 1986–87, 1992–93, 1993–94, 1996–97
  - Division Two – Runners-up (1): 2012–13
- Gwynedd League:
  - Runners-up: 1983–84
- Anglesey League:
  - Champions (7): 1923-24, 1953–54, 1974–75, 1975–76, 1976–77, 1981–82, 1982–83

Cups

- North Wales Coast FA Junior Challenge Cup
  - Champions (4): 1975–76, 1980–81, 1982–83, 2015–16 (reserves)
- Dargie Cup:
  - Champions (7): 1923-24, 1973-74, 1974-75, 1975-76, 1976-77, 1981-82, 2015-16
- North Wales Coast FA Intermediate Cup
  - Runners Up: 1975-76
- Cookson Cup:
  - Champions (3): 1994-95, 1999-00, 2000-01
