= 2019–20 Welsh Alliance League =

Welsh Alliance League
- Season: 2019–20
- Dates: 9 August 2019 –
- Matches played: 200
- Goals scored: 892 (4.46 per match)
- Biggest home win: Division 1 Penrhyndeudraeth 7–2 Llandyrnog United (21 September 2019); Denbigh Town 5–0 Llanberis (9 November 2019); Division 2 Gaerwen 8–0 Aberffraw (21 August 2019)
- Biggest away win: Division 1 Blaenau Ffestiniog Amateur 1–11 Denbigh Town (21 December 2019); Division 2 Llandudno Junction 3–9 Gaerwen (28 September 2019)
- Highest scoring: Division 1 Blaenau Ffestiniog Amateur 1–11 Denbigh Town (21 December 2019); Division 2 Llandudno Junction 3–9 Gaerwen (28 September 2019)
- Highest attendance: 200 – Division 1 Denbigh Town 3–1 Llandyrnog United (27 August 2019); Llandudno Albion 3–0 Holyhead Hotspur (28 August 2019); 175 – Division 2 Barmouth & Dyffryn United 4–5 Pwllheli (13 August 2019)
- All statistics correct as of 21 December 2019.

The 2019–20 Welsh Alliance League, known as the Lock Stock Welsh Alliance League for sponsorship reasons, was the 36th, and final season of the Welsh Alliance League, which consisted of two divisions: the third and fourth levels of the Welsh football pyramid.

There are sixteen teams in Division 1 and fifteen teams in Division 2, with the champions of Division 1 promoted to the Cymru North and the bottom two relegated to Division 2. In Division 2, the champions and the top two runners-up will be promoted to the newly formed FAW League One.

The season commenced on 9 August 2019.

== Division 1 ==
=== Teams ===
Llangefni Town were champions in the previous season and were promoted to the newly formed Cymru North. They were replaced by Denbigh Town and Holyhead Hotspur who were both relegated from the now defunct Cymru Alliance.

The bottom two teams from the previous season, Barmouth & Dyffryn United and Llandudno Junction, were relegated to Division 2 for 2019–20. In Division 2 champions, Glan Conwy and runners-up, Blaenau Ffestiniog Amateur were promoted in their place.

Locations of the Division 1 teams of the 2019–20 Welsh Alliance League

==== Grounds and locations ====
Team	Location	Ground
Blaenau Ffestiniog Amateur	Blaenau Ffestiniog	Cae Clyd
Bodedern Athletic	Bodedern	Cae Tŷ Cristion, Village Hall
Denbigh Town	Denbigh	Central Park
Glan Conwy	Glan Conwy	Cae Ffwt
Greenfield	Greenfield	Bagillt Road
Holyhead Hotspur	Holyhead	The New Oval
Llanberis	Llanberis	Ffordd Padarn
Llandudno Albion	Llandudno	Ffordd Dwyfor
Llandyrnog United	Llandyrnog	Cae Nant
Llanrug United	Llanrug	Eithin Duon
Llanrwst United	Llanrwst	Gwydir Park
Mynydd Llandegai	Mynydd Llandygai	Mynydd Llandegai
Nantlle Vale	Penygroes	Maes Dulyn
Penrhyndeudraeth	Penrhyndeudraeth	Maes Y Parc
Prestatyn Sports	Prestatyn	Gronant Playing Fields
St Asaph City	St Asaph	Roe Plas

=== League table ===
Pos	Team	Pld	W	D	L	GF	GA	GD	Pts	Promotion or relegation
1	Holyhead Hotspur	14	12	0	2	47	19	+28	36	Promotion to Cymru North
2	Denbigh Town	14	10	1	3	42	17	+25	31	
3	Llandudno Albion	13	8	2	3	36	21	+15	26	
4	Llanrwst United	12	8	1	3	31	20	+11	25	
5	Glan Conwy	16	7	3	6	29	25	+4	24	
6	Greenfield	12	7	1	4	24	13	+11	22	
7	Bodedern Athletic	12	6	1	5	23	18	+5	19	
8	Llanberis	13	6	1	6	20	25	−5	19	
9	Nantlle Vale	13	4	6	3	26	22	+4	18	
10	Mynydd Llandegai	15	4	4	7	24	36	−12	16	
11	St Asaph City	14	3	5	6	19	25	−6	14	
12	Penrhyndeudraeth	15	4	2	9	28	36	−8	14	
13	Llanrug United	9	3	3	3	17	15	+2	12	
14	Blaenau Ffestiniog Amateur	11	3	0	8	18	41	−23	9	
15	Llandyrnog United	11	2	1	8	21	42	−21	7	Relegation to FAW League One
16	Prestatyn Sports	12	0	1	11	16	46	−30	1	Relegation to FAW League One

Updated to match(es) played on 21 December 2019. Source: Welsh Alliance League
Rules for classification: 1) Points; 2) Goal difference; 3) Goals scored; 4) Matches won; 5) Play-off.

=== Results ===
Home \ Away	BFA	BOD	DEN	GLC	GRE	HHD	LNB	LNA	LLD	LRU	LRW	MYN	NAN	PEN	PRE	STA
Blaenau Ffestiniog Amateur	—	0–4	1–11		0–4				5–2		2–4	2–1	3–4	1–3		
Bodedern Athletic		—	1–0	2–3			2–0					2–1			3–1	
Denbigh Town			—	1–0			5–0	2–3	3–1	3–2		4–1				
Glan Conwy		2–1	1–2	—		0–1		2–1			2–2	3–4		3–2	3–2	2–2
Greenfield		3–1		2–1	—	2–3	4–0				1–2			1–0		2–2
Holyhead Hotspur	4–0		2–1			—	2–1					5–1	2–1		5–1	
Llanberis				2–1		0–4	—	3–0				0–0	1–3	3–0	2–0	
Llandudno Albion				1–1		3–0		—				2–2	2–1	4–1	5–1	4–3
Llandyrnog United		2–4				1–6		2–5	—		1–4	4–2	1–4		5–2	
Llanrug United	2–4				2–0			3–1	0–0	—				4–2	1–1	
Llanrwst United	2–0		1–3		0–2	5–1		0–5			—	4–1				
Mynydd Llandegai			3–3							2–1		—	4–4		1–0	1–0
Nantlle Vale		1–1		0–1	1–0					2–2			—			1–1
Penrhyndeudraeth		3–2	0–2		1–3				7–2		1–4	2–0	3–3	—		3–3
Prestatyn Sports						2–9	3–7				1–3				—	1–2
St Asaph City		2–0	1–2	0–4		1–3	0–1						1–1	1–0		—

Updated to match(es) played on 21 December 2019. Source: Welsh Alliance League - Results Grid
Legend: Blue = home team win; Yellow = draw; Red = away team win.

=== Team form ===
Team ╲ Round	1	2	3	4	5	6	7	8	9	10	11	12	13	14	15	16
Blaenau Ffestiniog Amateur	W	W	L	L	L	L	L	W	L	L	L					
Bodedern Athletic	L	W	L	D	W	W	L	W	W	W	L	L				
Denbigh Town	W	W	W	W	L	W	W	W	L	L	W	W	D	W		
Glan Conwy	L	W	W	W	L	L	L	D	W	D	L	D	W	W	W	L
Greenfield	W	L	D	W	W	L	L	W	W	W	W	L				
Holyhead Hotspur	W	W	W	W	L	W	W	W	W	L	W	W	W	W		
Llanberis	W	L	W	L	W	W	L	D	L	L	L	W	W			
Llandudno Albion	W	W	W	L	L	W	W	W	W	D	D	W	L			
Llandyrnog United	L	L	L	L	L	W	L	L	W	L	D					
Llanrug United	L	L	L	W	D	W	D	W	D							
Llanrwst United	L	W	L	W	W	L	W	D	W	W	W	W				
Mynydd Llandegai	L	L	L	W	W	L	D	W	D	D	W	D	L	L	L	
Nantlle Vale	D	D	W	D	W	D	W	L	L	D	L	W	D			
Penrhyndeudraeth	L	D	L	W	L	L	L	W	L	D	W	L	L	L	W	
Prestatyn Sports	L	L	L	L	L	L	D	L	L	L	L	L				
St Asaph City	D	L	L	D	L	W	W	D	L	D	L	L	W	D		

Updated to match(es) played on 21 December 2019. Source: Welsh Alliance League - Results Grid

== Division 2 ==
=== Teams ===
Glan Conwy were champions in the previous season and were promoted to Division 1 along with runners-up, Blaenau Ffestiniog Amateur. They were replaced by Barmouth & Dyffryn United and Llandudno Junction who were both relegated from Division 1.

The bottom team from the previous season was Amlwch Town, who avoided relegation as Meliden resigned from the Welsh Alliance League at the end of the season.

Gwynedd League runners-up, Gwalchmai and Vale of Clwyd and Conwy Football League Premier Division champions, Llandudno Amateurs were promoted to Welsh Alliance League Division 2.

On 21 July 2019, Llannerch-y-medd resigned from the Welsh Alliance League after losing the entire squad of players from the previous season for various reasons. They will now play in the Gwynedd League for the 2019–20 season.

Locations of the Division 2 teams of the 2019–20 Welsh Alliance League

==== Grounds and locations ====
Team	Location	Ground
Aberffraw	Aberffraw	Tŷ Croes
Amlwch Town	Amlwch	Lôn Bach
Barmouth & Dyffryn United	Barmouth	Wern Mynach
Gaerwen	Gaerwen	Lôn Groes
Gwalchmai	Gwalchmai	Maes Meurig
Holyhead Town	Holyhead	Millbank Sports Field
Kinmel Bay	Kinmel Bay	Cader Avenue
Llandudno Amateurs	Llandudno	The Oval
Llandudno Junction	Llandudno Junction	The Flyover
Llannefydd	Llannefydd	Llannefydd Denbigh
Mochdre Sports	Mochdre	Swan Road
Penmaenmawr Phoenix	Penmaenmawr	Cae Sling
Pentraeth	Pentraeth	Bryniau Field
Pwllheli	Pwllheli	Leisure Centre, Recreation Road
Y Felinheli	Y Felinheli	Cae Selio, Bangor Street

=== League table ===
Pos	Team	Pld	W	D	L	GF	GA	GD	Pts	Promotion or relegation
1	Gwalchmai	15	9	3	3	39	26	+13	30	Promotion to FAW League One
2	Y Felinheli	13	8	4	1	45	27	+18	28	Promotion to FAW League One
3	Penmaenmawr Phoenix	15	8	3	4	35	23	+12	27	
4	Gaerwen	12	8	1	3	39	18	+21	25	
5	Kinmel Bay	14	7	2	5	39	40	−1	23	
6	Pwllheli	13	7	1	5	34	30	+4	22	
7	Barmouth & Dyffryn United	12	6	2	4	26	22	+4	20	
8	Holyhead Town	11	6	1	4	33	23	+10	19	
9	Llannefydd	9	6	0	3	31	18	+13	18	
10	Llandudno Amateurs	14	3	5	6	29	40	−11	14	
11	Mochdre Sports	13	3	3	7	21	28	−7	12	
12	Amlwch Town	13	4	0	9	27	43	−16	12	
13	Llandudno Junction	13	3	2	8	25	40	−15	11	
14	Pentraeth	16	2	2	12	31	57	−26	8	Relegation to Gwynedd League / Vale of Clwyd and Conwy Football League
15	Aberffraw	11	2	1	8	17	36	−19	7	Relegation to Gwynedd League / Vale of Clwyd and Conwy Football League

Updated to match(es) played on 21 December 2019. Source: Welsh Alliance League
Rules for classification: 1) Points; 2) Goal difference; 3) Goals scored; 4) Matches won; 5) Play-off.

=== Results ===
Home \ Away	ABF	AML	BDU	GAR	GWA	HOL	KIN	LDA	LNJ	LLF	MOC	PHO	PEN	PWL	FEL
Aberffraw	—						4–5					0–3	3–1	0–4	
Amlwch Town	2–0	—	0–3		1–5		4–1	3–4	2–1		1–3		3–2		
Barmouth & Dyffryn United			—	3–2				3–1		0–1			4–0	4–5	
Gaerwen	8–0			—			3–1		4–1		1–0		1–0	1–4	6–0
Gwalchmai				1–2	—	3–1				4–3	3–1	2–2	2–3	3–1	2–4
Holyhead Town		6–5	0–2			—	1–2	6–3	5–1		1–2	3–2		6–0	
Kinmel Bay		7–1			2–5		—	1–1		4–3			4–2	3–1	3–3
Llandudno Amateurs	2–2			2–2	0–1			—				2–3	3–2		4–4
Llandudno Junction	3–1	3–1	0–0	3–9			2–4		—			0–2	2–2	2–3	
Llannefydd	5–3		6–0					3–1		—	3–1				3–4
Mochdre Sports	0–3		3–3		2–3		3–1		2–4		—				
Penmaenmawr Phoenix		5–3		3–0	1–1	1–2	7–1	0–0			1–0	—			0–3
Pentraeth					2–3			4–5	5–3	1–4	2–2	3–4	—		1–6
Pwllheli	3–1		1–2		1–1							3–1	8–1	—	
Y Felinheli		3–1	3–2			2–2		6–1			2–2			5–0	—

Updated to match(es) played on 21 December 2019. Source: Welsh Alliance League - Results Grid
Legend: Blue = home team win; Yellow = draw; Red = away team win.

=== Team form ===
Team ╲ Round	1	2	3	4	5	6	7	8	9	10	11	12	13	14	15	16
Aberffraw	L	L	L	L	L	W	L	L	D	L	W					
Amlwch Town	W	W	L	L	W	W	L	L	L	L	L	L	L			
Barmouth & Dyffryn United	L	L	D	W	W	L	W	D	W	W	W	L				
Gaerwen	W	W	W	W	W	L	L	W	W	D	L	W				
Gwalchmai	W	L	D	D	L	W	W	L	W	W	W	W	W	W	D	
Holyhead Town	W	W	L	D	W	W	W	L	L	W	L					
Kinmel Bay	L	W	L	W	W	L	W	L	W	D	W	L	W	D		
Llandudno Amateurs	L	L	D	W	L	L	W	L	W	D	L	D	D	D		
Llandudno Junction	D	W	D	L	L	L	L	L	W	L	W	L	L			
Llannefydd	W	L	W	W	W	W	L	L	W							
Mochdre Sports	L	W	L	L	L	W	D	L	L	D	D	W	L			
Penmaenmawr Phoenix	L	W	D	D	W	W	W	L	W	W	W	W	L	L	D	
Pentraeth	D	L	L	L	L	L	L	L	W	L	L	W	D	L	L	L
Pwllheli	W	W	D	L	L	W	L	L	W	W	L	W	W			
Y Felinheli	L	W	D	W	W	W	W	W	D	D	D	W	W			

Updated to match(es) played on 21 December 2019. Source: Welsh Alliance League - Results Grid
