= 2019–20 Gwynedd League =

Gwynedd League
- Season: 2019–20
- Dates: 10 August 2019 –
- Matches played: 88
- Goals scored: 486 (5.52 per match)
- Biggest home win: Bangor 1876 14–0 Bethesda Athletic (15 October 2019)
- Biggest away win: Llannerch-y-medd 1–9 Bontnewydd (5 September 2019)
- Highest scoring: Bangor 1876 14–0 Bethesda Athletic (15 October 2019)
- Highest attendance: 442; Ogwen Tigers 1–4 Bangor 1876 (10 August 2019)
- All statistics correct as of 21 December 2019.

The 2019–20 Gwynedd League, known as The Cynghrair Peldroed Gwynedd Football League for sponsorship reasons, is the 37th season of the Gwynedd League, which is in the fifth level of the Welsh football pyramid.

There are fifteen teams in the division, with the champions promoted to the Welsh Alliance League and the bottom two teams relegated to the Anglesey League.

The season commenced on 10 August 2019.

== Teams ==
Menai Bridge Tigers were champions in the previous season, however runners-up Gwalchmai gained promotion to the Welsh Alliance League Division 2 after Menai Bridge Tigers were refused promotion by the FAW due to inadequate toilet facilities.

Bangor 1876 a new club founded by the supporters of Bangor City and Bethesda Athletic joined the league at the start of the season.

Anglesey League Champions, Bryngwran Bulls and Runner's up, Caergybi gained promotion to the Gwynedd League.

During the pre-season Bryngwran Bulls and Trearddur Bay United merged to form Trearddur Bay Bulls.

Llannerch-y-medd joined the Gwynedd League after resigning from the Welsh Alliance League due to losing the entire squad of players from the previous season for various reasons.

Locations of teams in the 2019–20 Gwynedd League

=== Grounds and locations ===
Team	Location	Ground
Bangor 1876	Bangor	Treborth
Bethesda Athletic	Bethesda	Parc Meurig
Bontnewydd	Bontnewydd	Cae Stanley
Bro Goronwy	Moelfre	Cae Nerys
Caergybi	Holyhead	Millbank Playing Fields
Glantraeth	Bodorgan	Trefdraeth
Llangoed	Llangoed	Tyddyn Paun
Llannerch-y-medd	Llanerch-y-medd	Tan Parc
Llanystumdwy	Llanystumdwy	Dwyfor Park
Menai Bridge Tigers	Menai Bridge	King George's Field
Ogwen Tigers	Bethesda	Bethesda Rugby Club
Nefyn United	Nefyn	Cae'r Delyn
Talysarn Celts	Talysarn	Talysarn
Trearddur Bay Bulls	Trearddur Bay	Lon Isallt
Waunfawr	Waunfawr	Aberforeshore

== League table ==
Pos	Team	Pld	W	D	L	GF	GA	GD	Pts	Promotion or relegation
1	Bangor 1876	16	16	0	0	115	9	+106	48	Promotion to Welsh Alliance League
2	Trearddur Bay Bulls	17	12	2	3	65	17	+48	38	
3	Menai Bridge Tigers	15	11	1	3	47	19	+28	34	
4	Nefyn United	14	10	2	2	47	18	+29	32	
5	Waunfawr	18	10	1	7	51	40	+11	31	
6	Llangoed	20	9	3	8	63	45	+18	30	
7	Bro Goronwy	16	9	2	5	34	26	+8	29	
8	Talysarn Celts	14	8	2	4	41	32	+9	26	
9	Bontnewydd	17	8	1	8	55	54	+1	25	
10	Glantraeth	15	5	2	8	30	46	−16	17	
11	Caergybi	15	4	4	7	27	42	−15	16	
12	Ogwen Tigers	19	5	1	13	32	60	−28	16	
13	Llanystumdwy	20	4	2	14	41	82	−41	14	
14	Bethesda Athletic	17	3	1	13	34	83	−49	10	Relegation to Anglesey League
15	Llannerch-y-medd	19	0	0	19	13	122	−109	0	Relegation to Anglesey League

Updated to match(es) played on 21 December 2019. Source: Gwynedd Football League
Rules for classification: 1) Points; 2) Goal difference; 3) Goals scored; 4) Matches won; 5) Play-off.

== Results ==
Home \ Away	BAN	BET	BON	BRO	CAE	GLA	LLG	LYM	LLY	MBT	NFU	OGT	TSC	TBB	WFR
Bangor 1876	—	14–0			10–0			12–0	6–0		3–1				
Bethesda Athletic		—	1–5				1–9		4–4	1–5		3–5		1–6	
Bontnewydd		0–2	—		1–5				2–3				5–4	1–0	3–3
Bro Goronwy			4–3	—	3–1			6–0	5–0	0–4		1–0	2–2		
Caergybi	0–6	3–1			—	0–0			2–1						
Glantraeth						—	2–3		3–3			2–1	3–5	0–7	
Llangoed	0–5	6–1		1–2	2–2	6–2	—	10–0		1–1		2–4		1–3	
Llannerch-y-medd			1–9	0–2	1–5	1–3		—	2–7						
Llanystumdwy			3–9			5–1		6–1	—		0–4	2–3			0–1
Menai Bridge Tigers			3–1					6–0		—	2–5	3–1	4–0		5–1
Nefyn United		3–0	5–0				2–1				—	2–1			3–1
Ogwen Tigers	1–4		1–7		2–2		1–5		2–1			—		2–3	
Talysarn Celts	2–4	5–4							4–1			5–3	—		2–1
Trearddur Bay Bulls	1–2				3–1		6–2	8–1		1–0	2–2			—	4–0
Waunfawr				2–0	5–2				6–2	2–3		5–2	3–2		—

Updated to match(es) played on 21 December 2019. Source: Gwynedd Football League - Results Grid
Legend: Blue = home team win; Yellow = draw; Red = away team win.
