= 2010–11 Welsh Alliance League =

Welsh Alliance League
- Season: 2010–11
- Dates: 13 August 2010 – 11 May 2011
- Champions: Division 1 – Conwy United; Division 2 – Caernarfon Wanderers
- Relegated: Division 1 – Llanberis
- Matches: 350
- Goals: 1,379 (3.94 per match)
- Biggest home win: Division 1 Conwy United 7–1 Bethesda Athletic (22 October 2010); Division 2 Connah's Quay Town 9–1 Gaerwen (30 April 2011)
- Biggest away win: Division 1 Bethesda Athletic 0–7 Llandudno Junction (4 September 2010); Division 2 Blaenau Ffestiniog Amateur 1–6 Caernarfon Wanderers (6 April 2011)
- Highest scoring: Division 1 Llanrwst United 6–5 Barmouth & Dyffryn United (19 March 2011); Division 2 Gaerwen 8–2 Nantlle Vale (9 October 2010); Greenfield 5–5 Bodedern Athletic (23 October 2010); Connah's Quay Town 9–1 Gaerwen (30 April 2011)
- Highest attendance: 350 – Division 1 Conwy United 5–2 Holyhead Hotspur (7 January 2011); 125 – Division 2 Bodedern Athletic 2–1 Caernarfon Wanderers (12 March 2011); Caernarfon Wanderers 6–0 Blaenau Ffestiniog Amateur (30 April 2011)
- Lowest attendance: 50 – Division 1 Glan Conwy 1–0 Gwalchmai; Holywell Town 0–0 Llanberis (14 August 2010); Llandudno Junction 3–0 Holywell Town; Llanrug United 1–0 Nefyn United (17 August 2010); Llanberis 2–0 Gwalchmai; Nefyn United 2–1 Barmouth & Dyffryn United (24 August 2010); Glan Conwy 0–0 Barmouth & Dyffryn United; Nefyn United 2–2 Holywell Town (4 September 2010); Llanrug United 2–1 Glan Conwy (11 September 2010); Glan Conwy 2–0 Llanberis; Llandudno Junction 1–1 Llanfairpwll (6 November 2010); Llanrug United 1–5 Llanrwst United (11 December 2010); Llandudno Junction 0–5 Holyhead Hotspur; Llanrwst United 1–1 Nefyn United (12 March 2011); Llandudno Junction 1–2 Gwalchmai (13 April 2011); Llanberis 0–1 Llanrwst United (16 April 2011); Denbigh Town 1–1 Llandudno Junction (20 April 2011); Glan Conwy 2–1 Llanrug United (23 April 2011); Bethesda Athletic 5–4 Llanberis (30 April 2011); 30 – Division 2 Halkyn United 2–2 Bodedern Athletic (11 September 2010); Connah's Quay Town 2–2 Nantlle Vale (12 February 2011)
- Average attendance: Division 1 – 114; Division 2 – 58
- All statistics correct as of 16 March 2019.

The 2010–11 Welsh Alliance League, known as the Lock Stock Welsh Alliance League for sponsorship reasons, is the 27th season of the Welsh Alliance League, which for the first time consists of two divisions: the third and fourth levels of the Welsh football pyramid.

There are sixteen teams in Division 1 and eleven teams in Division 2, with the champions of Division 1 promoted to the Cymru Alliance and the bottom team relegated to Division 2. In Division 2, the champions, and runners-up are promoted to Division 1.

The season began on 13 August 2010 and concluded on 11 May 2011 with Conwy United as Division 1 champions, Llanberis were relegated to Division 2. In Division 2, Caernarfon Wanderers were champions with Bodedern Athletic as runners-up.

== Division 1 ==
=== Teams ===
Rhydymwyn were champions in the previous season and were promoted to the Cymru Alliance and replaced by Holyhead Hotspur, Bethesda Athletic, Denbigh Town, Llanfairpwll and Caernarfon Town who were all relegated from the Cymru Alliance.

Blaenau Ffestiniog Amateur, Llandyrnog United, Nantlle Vale, Amlwch Town and Halkyn United were relegated to the newly formed Division 2.

==== Grounds and locations ====
| Team | Location | Ground |
|---|---|---|
| Barmouth & Dyffryn United | Barmouth | Wern Mynach |
| Bethesda Athletic | Bethesda | Parc Meurig |
| Caernarfon Town | Caernarfon | The Oval |
| Conwy United | Conwy | Y Morfa |
| Denbigh Town | Denbigh | Central Park |
| Glan Conwy | Glan Conwy | Cae Ffwt |
| Gwalchmai | Gwalchmai | Maes Meurig |
| Holyhead Hotspur | Holyhead | The New Stadium |
| Holywell Town | Holywell | Halkyn Road |
| Llanberis | Llanberis | Ffordd Padarn |
| Llandudno Junction | Llandudno Junction | Arriva Ground |
| Llanfairpwll | Llanfairpwllgwyngyll | Maes Eilian |
| Llanrug United | Llanrug | Eithin Duon |
| Llanrwst United | Llanrwst | Gwydir Park |
| Nefyn United | Nefyn | Cae'r Delyn |
| Pwllheli | Pwllheli | Leisure Centre, Recreation Road |

Locations of the Division 1 teams of the 2010–11 Welsh Alliance League

=== League table ===
| Pos | Team | Pld | W | D | L | GF | GA | GD | Pts | Promotion or relegation |
|---|---|---|---|---|---|---|---|---|---|---|
| 1 | Conwy United (C, P) | 30 | 25 | 2 | 3 | 89 | 30 | +59 | 77 | Promotion to Cymru Alliance |
| 2 | Holyhead Hotspur | 30 | 20 | 6 | 4 | 82 | 36 | +46 | 66 | |
| 3 | Holywell Town | 30 | 17 | 3 | 10 | 68 | 40 | +28 | 54 | |
| 4 | Denbigh Town | 30 | 13 | 7 | 10 | 53 | 53 | 0 | 46 | |
| 5 | Caernarfon Town | 30 | 13 | 4 | 13 | 58 | 59 | −1 | 43 | |
| 6 | Llanfairpwll | 30 | 12 | 6 | 12 | 55 | 52 | +3 | 42 | |
| 7 | Gwalchmai | 30 | 10 | 10 | 10 | 47 | 45 | +2 | 40 | |
| 8 | Nefyn United | 30 | 10 | 7 | 13 | 40 | 54 | −14 | 37 | |
| 9 | Bethesda Athletic | 30 | 10 | 7 | 13 | 57 | 82 | −25 | 37 | |
| 10 | Glan Conwy | 30 | 10 | 6 | 14 | 47 | 50 | −3 | 36 | |
| 11 | Pwllheli (Note: Pwllheli were deducted three points for non fulfilment of fixture.) | 30 | 10 | 9 | 11 | 42 | 46 | −4 | 36 | |
| 12 | Llanrwst United | 30 | 9 | 8 | 13 | 50 | 60 | −10 | 35 | |
| 13 | Llanrug United | 30 | 11 | 2 | 17 | 62 | 75 | −13 | 35 | |
| 14 | Barmouth & Dyffryn United | 30 | 10 | 5 | 15 | 59 | 77 | −18 | 35 | |
| 15 | Llandudno Junction | 30 | 8 | 10 | 12 | 54 | 65 | −11 | 34 | |
| 16 | Llanberis (R) | 30 | 4 | 4 | 22 | 42 | 81 | −39 | 16 | Relegation to Division 2 |

Source: Welsh Alliance League
Rules for classification: 1) Points; 2) Goal difference; 3) Goals scored; 4) Matches won; 5) Play-off.
(C) Champions; (P) Promoted; (R) Relegated

=== Results ===
| Home \ Away | BDU | BET | CAE | CON | DEN | GLC | GWA | HOH | HOL | LNB | LNJ | LPG | LRU | LRW | NEF | PWL |
|---|---|---|---|---|---|---|---|---|---|---|---|---|---|---|---|---|
| Barmouth & Dyffryn United | — | 4–1 | 0–3 | 2–2 | 2–0 | 1–4 | 2–4 | 4–2 | 0–3 | 4–1 | 2–2 | 2–3 | 3–4 | 1–1 | 4–2 | 0–4 |
| Bethesda Athletic | 4–5 | — | 4–3 | 1–5 | 2–2 | 0–2 | 1–1 | 2–3 | 0–4 | 5–4 | 0–7 | 2–4 | 4–2 | 2–2 | 3–1 | 3–2 |
| Caernarfon Town | 2–1 | 0–1 | — | 3–2 | 1–1 | 4–4 | 4–3 | 1–3 | 1–3 | 3–1 | 4–5 | 1–0 | 2–1 | 0–4 | 1–0 | 0–0 |
| Conwy United | 5–0 | 7–1 | 2–1 | — | 2–0 | 2–0 | 3–1 | 5–2 | 6–0 | 3–1 | 7–2 | 2–1 | 2–0 | 2–1 | 3–2 | 2–1 |
| Denbigh Town | 2–4 | 0–5 | 1–4 | 2–1 | — | 3–0 | 0–0 | 0–1 | 3–3 | 1–0 | 1–1 | 0–1 | 5–2 | 2–1 | 3–0 | 3–0 |
| Glan Conwy | 0–0 | 3–0 | 1–2 | 2–3 | 3–5 | — | 1–0 | 1–1 | 0–3 | 2–0 | 2–2 | 5–1 | 2–1 | 2–1 | 1–2 | 1–0 |
| Gwalchmai | 4–0 | 0–1 | 2–1 | 0–3 | 2–2 | 4–3 | — | 1–1 | 1–0 | 1–1 | 2–2 | 1–1 | 5–2 | 3–1 | 1–3 | 1–0 |
| Holyhead Hotspur | 4–1 | 6–1 | 0–0 | 1–0 | 4–0 | 0–3 | 1–1 | — | 3–2 | 6–1 | 2–2 | 3–0 | 6–1 | 4–0 | 3–1 | 3–0 |
| Holywell Town | 4–0 | 1–3 | 3–1 | 0–1 | 1–2 | 2–0 | 1–0 | 1–0 | — | 0–0 | 4–0 | 4–1 | 4–2 | 4–0 | 5–1 | 4–0 |
| Llanberis | 0–2 | 2–3 | 2–4 | 1–3 | 3–6 | 4–1 | 2–0 | 0–5 | 1–5 | — | 3–2 | 1–2 | 3–4 | 0–1 | 1–3 | 2–3 |
| Llandudno Junction | 2–1 | 1–1 | 2–5 | 1–3 | 3–0 | 3–1 | 1–2 | 0–5 | 3–0 | 2–3 | — | 1–1 | 2–1 | 1–2 | 0–1 | 3–2 |
| Llanfairpwll | 3–4 | 2–0 | 3–2 | 0–2 | 4–2 | 0–0 | 1–1 | 2–3 | 1–2 | 2–0 | 6–1 | — | 1–3 | 5–0 | 3–3 | 1–3 |
| Llanrug United | 3–4 | 2–2 | 5–1 | 2–4 | 2–4 | 2–1 | 2–1 | 2–3 | 4–1 | 2–0 | 1–1 | 0–3 | — | 1–5 | 1–0 | 4–1 |
| Llanrwst United | 6–5 | 3–3 | 1–2 | 1–3 | 0–1 | 2–1 | 2–0 | 2–3 | 2–1 | 1–1 | 1–1 | 1–1 | 3–2 | — | 1–1 | 1–1 |
| Nefyn United | 2–1 | 3–1 | 2–1 | 1–1 | 1–1 | 1–0 | 1–3 | 0–2 | 2–2 | 3–3 | 1–0 | 0–1 | 0–3 | 3–2 | — | 0–0 |
| Pwllheli | 0–0 | 1–1 | 2–1 | 0–3 | 0–1 | 1–1 | 2–2 | 2–2 | 2–1 | 2–1 | 1–1 | 3–1 | 2–1 | 4–2 | 3–0 | — |

Source: Welsh Alliance League – Division 1 Results Grid
Legend: Blue = home team win; Yellow = draw; Red = away team win.

== Division 2 ==
=== Teams ===
Last season's bottom 5 teams: Blaenau Ffestiniog Amateur, Llandyrnog United, Nantlle Vale, Amlwch Town and Halkyn United were relegated and joining them to form the new Division 2 were Bodedern Athletic, Caernarfon Wanderers, Connah's Quay Town, Gaerwen, Greenfield and Penmaenmawr Phoenix.

==== Grounds and locations ====
Locations of the Division 2 teams of the 2010–11 Welsh Alliance League

| Team | Location | Ground |
|---|---|---|
| Amlwch Town | Amlwch | Lôn Bach |
| Blaenau Ffestiniog Amateur | Blaenau Ffestiniog | Cae Clyd |
| Bodedern Athletic | Bodedern | Cae'r Ysgol |
| Caernarfon Wanderers | Caernarfon | Cae Top |
| Connah's Quay Town | Connah's Quay | Dock Road |
| Gaerwen | Gaerwen | Lôn Groes |
| Greenfield | Greenfield | Bagillt Road |
| Halkyn United | Halkyn | Pant Newydd |
| Llandyrnog United | Llandyrnog | Cae Nant |
| Nantlle Vale | Penygroes | Maes Dulyn |
| Penmaenmawr Phoenix | Penmaenmawr | Cae Sling |

=== League table ===
| Pos | Team | Pld | W | D | L | GF | GA | GD | Pts | Promotion or relegation |
|---|---|---|---|---|---|---|---|---|---|---|
| 1 | Caernarfon Wanderers (C, P) | 20 | 15 | 1 | 4 | 63 | 29 | +34 | 46 | Promotion to Division 1 |
| 2 | Bodedern Athletic (P) | 20 | 14 | 3 | 3 | 55 | 25 | +30 | 45 | Promotion to Division 1 |
| 3 | Connah's Quay Town | 20 | 13 | 2 | 5 | 49 | 26 | +23 | 41 | |
| 4 | Llandyrnog United | 20 | 12 | 1 | 7 | 54 | 28 | +26 | 37 | |
| 5 | Amlwch Town | 20 | 8 | 4 | 8 | 43 | 49 | −6 | 28 | |
| 6 | Greenfield | 20 | 7 | 5 | 8 | 42 | 38 | +4 | 26 | |
| 7 | Penmaenmawr Phoenix | 20 | 6 | 3 | 11 | 43 | 48 | −5 | 21 | |
| 8 | Nantlle Vale | 20 | 6 | 1 | 13 | 23 | 55 | −32 | 19 | |
| 9 | Halkyn United | 20 | 5 | 3 | 12 | 30 | 51 | −21 | 18 | |
| 10 | Blaenau Ffestiniog Amateur | 20 | 5 | 2 | 13 | 32 | 61 | −29 | 17 | |
| 11 | Gaerwen (Note: Gaerwen were deducted three points for non fulfilment of fixture.) | 20 | 5 | 3 | 12 | 40 | 64 | −24 | 15 | |

Source: Welsh Alliance League
Rules for classification: 1) Points; 2) Goal difference; 3) Goals scored; 4) Matches won; 5) Play-off.
(C) Champions; (P) Promoted

=== Results ===
| Home \ Away | AML | BFA | BOD | CAW | CQT | GAR | GRE | HAL | LLD | NAN | PHO |
|---|---|---|---|---|---|---|---|---|---|---|---|
| Amlwch Town | — | 5–1 | 0–1 | 2–2 | 2–1 | 2–2 | 2–1 | 5–4 | 1–5 | 2–2 | 1–3 |
| Blaenau Ffestiniog Amateur | 2–5 | — | 1–5 | 1–6 | 1–2 | 1–1 | 3–2 | 2–4 | 2–2 | 5–3 | 3–1 |
| Bodedern Athletic | 4–0 | 3–2 | — | 2–1 | 3–0 | 2–1 | 1–1 | 2–0 | 4–0 | 4–1 | 4–2 |
| Caernarfon Wanderers | 1–2 | 6–0 | 3–0 | — | 3–2 | 6–2 | 2–1 | 3–1 | 0–2 | 6–0 | 4–3 |
| Connah's Quay Town | 5–0 | 2–0 | 0–3 | 2–1 | — | 9–1 | 1–0 | 4–0 | 4–3 | 3–0 | 2–1 |
| Gaerwen | 4–3 | 3–4 | 2–5 | 2–4 | 2–0 | — | 2–6 | 2–3 | 3–2 | 8–2 | 1–1 |
| Greenfield | 2–3 | 1–0 | 5–5 | 2–4 | 2–2 | 4–0 | — | 4–1 | 0–3 | 3–2 | 3–1 |
| Halkyn United | 2–2 | 1–0 | 2–2 | 1–3 | 0–3 | 1–2 | 2–2 | — | 1–3 | 4–0 | 2–0 |
| Llandyrnog United | 2–1 | 4–0 | 3–1 | 1–3 | 0–2 | 2–1 | 0–1 | 7–0 | — | 5–0 | 5–0 |
| Nantlle Vale | 0–3 | 2–0 | 1–0 | 0–1 | 1–2 | 1–0 | 4–2 | 2–0 | 0–3 | — | 2–1 |
| Penmaenmawr Phoenix | 5–2 | 3–4 | 0–4 | 3–4 | 3–3 | 6–1 | 0–0 | 3–1 | 4–2 | 3–0 | — |

Source: Welsh Alliance League – Division 2 Results Grid
Legend: Blue = home team win; Yellow = draw; Red = away team win.
