= Medwyn Evans =

Welsh footballer

Personal information
- Full name: Medwyn John Evans
- Date of birth: 8 November 1964 (age 61)
- Place of birth: Brynteg, Anglesey, Wales
- Position: Midfielder

Youth career
- Wrexham

Senior career*
Years	Team	Apps	(Gls)
1983–1984	Wrexham	17	(0)
- Bangor City
- Bethesda Athletic
- Glantraeth
- Bodedern Athletic
- Llannerchymedd
- * Club domestic league appearances and goals

Medwyn John Evans (born 8 November 1964) is a Welsh former professional footballer who played as a midfielder. He made appearances in the English Football League with Wrexham.

He also played in the Welsh leagues for Bangor City, Bethesda Athletic, Glantraeth, Bodedern Athletic and Llannerch-y-medd, where he later served as assistant manager.

== Personal life ==
Evans had two sons, Chris and Deion. Chris was an apprentice at Wrexham and played for Bangor City and Llannerch-y-medd. and Deion was an apprentice at Tranmere Rovers. Chris died in 2015 aged 27.
