= C.P.D. Bontnewydd =

Football club based in Gwynedd

Coordinates: 53.117570°N 4.260899°W

Bontnewydd
- Full name: Clwb Pel Droed Bontnewydd
- Nickname: Bont
- Ground: Cae Stanley
- Manager: Chris Owen
- League: North Wales Coast West Premier Division
- 2025–26: North Wales Coast West Premier Division, 12th of 15
- Website: cpdbontnewydd.co.uk
Home colours	Away colours

C.P.D. Bontnewydd is a Welsh football club based in Bontnewydd, Gwynedd. They currently play in the North Wales Coast West Premier Division. The club has also competed in the Welsh Cup.

== History ==
In the 1905–06 season, Bontnewydd had a team in the Caernarfonshire & District League.

In 1987–88 the club were Caernarfon & District League champions. This gained them promotion to the Gwynedd League, however they only stayed in the league for one season before folding.

Bontnewydd returned to senior football in 2004, rejoining the Caernarfon & District League. In the final game of the season, the team needed a win to win the league title. They did so, winning 4–0, to finish top ahead of Caernarfon Borough on goal difference. The club then joined the Gwynedd League.

Bontnewydd won the Tarian Safeflue Shield in the 2015–16 season, and again in 2016–17. In 2017–18 they reached the final of the NWCFA Junior Cup, but lost 4–2 to Nefyn United after extra time.

Simon Jones became chairman in 2018, and took over as manager during the 2019–20 season.

In 2020 the club were announced as members of the newly-formed North Wales Coast West Football League, and placed into Division One. The new league's first season was cancelled due to the COVID-19 pandemic, and it was first played in 2021–22. Bontnewydd finished ninth, and finished third in the following season.

In the 2023–24 season they won the Division One title, going unbeaten in the league, and also winning the Division One Cup. As a result, they were promoted to the Premier Division.

In their first season in the Premier Division, the team finished 13th out of 16 teams. At the end of the season, Simon Jones stepped down as manager. For the following season, Chris Owen was appointed as the first team manager. He had previously coached at Nantlle Vale, Caernarfon Town's academy, and Bontnewydd's reserve team.

=== Welsh Cup results ===
As of 2 November 2025

Season	Round	Opponents	Score	Source
2022–23	First qualifying round	Mountain Rangers (H)	4–0	
2022–23	Second qualifying round	Llanuwchllyn (A)	0–4	
2023–24	First qualifying round	Llanberis (A)	2–7	
2024–25	First qualifying round	Holyhead Town (A)	2–0	
2024–25	Second qualifying round	Llanberis (A)	1–4	
2025–26	First qualifying round	Llannefydd (H)	1–5	

== Ground ==
The club plays at Cae Stanley. In 2024 a 100-seater stand was built in memory of Josh Lloyd Roberts, who had played for Bontnewydd until he died on 2 June 2023, at 19 years old. This new stand was necessary for the club to meet the ground requirements for promotion to tier 4.

== Honours ==
- Caernarfon & District League - Champions: 1987–88, 2004–05
- North Wales Coast West Football League Division One - Champions: 2023–24
- North Wales Coast West Football League Division One Cup - Winners: 2023–24
- NWCFA Junior Cup - Runners-up: 2017–18
- Tarian Safeflue Shield - Winners: 2015–16, 2016–17
