= Llandegfan F.C. =

Football club based in Anglesey

Llandegfan FC
- Full name: Llandegfan Football Club
- Nickname: Llandeg
- Founded: 1897
- Dissolved: 2021
- Ground: Parc Eurfryn
- Capacity: 200
- Chairman: Eurfryn Davis , Jordan Love , William Love
- Manager: Jordan Love
- League: Anglesey League
- 2019–20: Anglesey League, 11th of 11

Llandegfan Football Club was a Welsh football club based in Llandegfan, Anglesey. The club traced its origins to 1897, when Llandegfan Swifts became founder members of the Anglesey League. During its history, the club won two Anglesey League titles and the North Wales Coast Football Association Junior Cup. Following periods of inactivity and reformation, the club was dissolved in 2021.

== History ==
Llandegfan Swifts were founder members of the Anglesey League in 1897. Llandegfan continued activity in local football during the 1900s.

In 1937–38 Llandegfan were Anglesey League champions. Their second Anglesey League title was achieved in 1973–74. The following season they won the NWCFA Junior Cup.

In 2012 Llandegfan merged with Sunday league team Antelope FC (founded in 2010) to form Llandegfan Antelope, but this new club folded in 2014.

The club was reformed in 2017, by Jordan Love, his father William Love and Dale Rowlands. The reformed club was named Llandegfan FC.

In 2020 they were announced as members of the newly-formed North Wales Coast West Football League Division One. However the 2020–21 season was cancelled due to the COVID-19 pandemic, and they did not enter the league for the following season. In 2023 the club committee looked to reform the club, however these plans failed. The Welsh Football Association made changes to their standards and requirements. Due to Llandegfan Football Club being a non-profit, community based club, and relying on funding by donations and maintenance volunteering the decision was made to resign from the league.

Llandegfan is also believed to hold the record of biggest win in North Wales football history, a 37–1 win over Holyhead Town reserves in the 1972–73 season.

== Ground ==
The ground is situated on the outskirts of the village and has been ranked one of the top grounds in the country and the united kingdom. The ground overlooks the Menai suspension bridge and the menai straits and has a full view of the famous welsh national mountain range, Snowdonia.

In 2017, The Committee, including Jordan Love (Founder), his father, William Love and the board members decided that the club's ground was to be renamed to Parc Eurfryn (or Eurfryn Park) in honour of joint-chairman Eurfryn Davies. Mr Davies is a well known figure in the village and the ground was renamed honoring his hard work, dedication and service to the community. Mr Davies would often be the first person at the ground preparing the changing rooms and also be the last one leaving to close the gate.

== Honours ==
- Anglesey League – Champions: 1937–38, 1973–74
- NWCFA Junior Cup – Winners: 1974–75
