= Dion Donohue =

Welsh footballer

Personal information
- Full name: Dion James Donohue
- Date of birth: 26 August 1993 (age 33)
- Place of birth: Bodedern, Wales
- Height: 5 ft 11 in (1.80 m)
- Positions: Midfielder; left back

Team information
- Current team: Bangor City 1876
- Number: 17

Youth career
- 2003: Bodedern Athletic
- 2004–2010: Everton

Senior career*
Years	Team	Apps	(Gls)
2011	Porthmadog		
2011–2012	Holyhead Hotspur	12	(3)
2012–2014	Caernarfon Town	60	(12)
2014–2015	Sutton Coldfield Town	37	(1)
2015–2017	Chesterfield	56	(1)
2017–2019	Portsmouth	42	(0)
2019	Mansfield Town	0	(0)
2019	Swindon Town	5	(0)
2020	Swindon Town	10	(0)
2021	Barrow	4	(0)
2021–2023	Caernarfon Town	62	(5)
2023–2025	Trearddur Bay	16	(1)
2025–	Bangor City 1876	20	(0)

International career
2011	Ynys Môn	4	(0)
2022	Wales C	1	(0)
- * Club domestic league appearances and goals as of 16:29, 12 September 2026 (UTC)

Dion James Donohue (born 26 August 1993) is a Welsh footballer who plays as a midfielder and full back for the Welsh Ardal NW club Bangor City 1876.

A former Everton trainee, he began his senior career in the lower levels of Welsh football with Porthmadog, Holyhead Hotspur and Caernarfon Town before switching to Sutton Coldfield Town of the Northern Premier League Division One South in 2014. A year later, he turned professional with Chesterfield in EFL League One, and spent two years with Portsmouth before joining Mansfield Town in 2019, where his contract was terminated for disciplinary reasons within two months of signing. After spells at Swindon Town and Barrow, he left professional football for family reasons and moved back to Caernarfon.

== Career ==
=== Early career ===
Donohue was born in Bodedern on Anglesey and played with Bodedern Athletic before joining Everton. He spent six years at Everton's academy and was unable to gain a professional contract. He returned to North Wales and played semi-pro football with Porthmadog, Holyhead Hotspur and Caernarfon Town. In 2014, he moved to the English non-league with Sutton Coldfield Town.

Donohue scored his first goal for Sutton on 27 September 2014, netting the first through a penalty kick in a 2–0 home win against Kidsgrove Athletic. He made 37 appearances for the club, as his side achieved promotion to Northern Premier League Premier League through the play-offs.

=== Chesterfield ===
Donohue went on trial at Chesterfield in the summer of 2015 and was able to earn a contract. He made his professional debut on 12 September 2015 in a 3–3 draw against Colchester United. Donohue signed a contract extension on 10 August 2016, keeping him at the club until 2018.

Donohue scored his first professional goal on 14 March 2017, netting the equalizer in a 3–3 home draw against Peterborough United. In May, he was awarded the Players' Player of the Year.

=== Portsmouth ===
On 18 August 2017 Donohue joined fellow League One club Portsmouth on a two-year deal for an undisclosed fee. He made his debut eight days later in a 1–1 draw at Wigan Athletic, being substituted after 53 minutes. On 17 October, he was sent off in a 2–1 loss at Doncaster Rovers for violent conduct towards Niall Mason, but Portsmouth successfully appealed against his three-game suspension.

Donohue played less frequently in 2018–19. In his first game, away to Crawley Town in the EFL Trophy on 9 October, he scored the only goal of the game, his first for Pompey. He was released on 17 May 2019.

=== Mansfield Town ===
On 9 July 2019, Donohue joined League Two side Mansfield Town on a two-year deal. He arrived not fully recovered from injury and made his debut in the EFL Cup first round match against Morecambe on 13 August, being substituted at half time because of his condition as the team lost on penalties after a 2–2 home draw.

On 19 August 2019 Donohue and Mansfield teammate Jacob Mellis were suspended by the club for "an alleged serious breach of club discipline". Following a club disciplinary investigation his contract was terminated on 2 September.

=== Swindon Town ===
On 12 October 2019, Donohue joined League Two side Swindon Town on month-by-month contract. He made his debut the same day in a 1–1 home draw with Plymouth Argyle, and after the game manager Richie Wellens said that the Robins had tried to sign him in the summer. As his second month was not registered in time with the EFL, he was then barred from playing again until 2 January.

Swindon did not negotiate to sign Donohue when January came, with Wellens saying that this was due to the player's injury, rather than his court proceedings.

On 25 September 2020, Donohue rejoined Swindon on a one-year deal. He left on 11 December for personal reasons. Due to injury, he had asked manager John Sheridan for leave to spend Christmas with his terminally ill niece, which was refused, prompting Donohue to cancel his contract.

=== Barrow ===
On 28 January 2021, Donohue joined Barrow on a short-term deal until the end of the season. He trained only three days a week due to his family condition. He was one of 13 players released at the end of the season.

=== Return to Caernarfon Town ===
Donohue rejoined Caenarfon Town in the Cymru Premier in June 2021. He had quit professional football at the age of 27 and moved back to North Wales in order to spend more time with his niece, who was terminally ill with a brain tumour; she died in July 2021 at the age of 5. He was named in the league's 2021–22 Team of the Season.

== International career ==
Donohue played for the representative team of Anglesey during the 2011 Island Games. He featured in all four of the side's games, against Gotland, the Isle of Wight, Gibraltar and Alderney.

Donohue was called up for the Wales C team of amateurs to face their English counterparts at his club ground of The Oval in Caernarfon on 31 March 2022. He played in the 4–0 win.

== Personal life ==
In January 2012, Donohue pleaded guilty at Caernarfon Magistrates Court to a charge of assaulting a woman at a nightclub in Bangor, Gwynedd, the previous 13 November. He was fined £500 and £85 court fees, and sentenced to 120 hours of community service and four weeks of curfew.

In January 2020, Donohue pleaded guilty at Nottingham Crown Court to charges of assault, affray and grievous bodily harm committed in Mansfield the previous 16 August. When sentenced in November, he took a bag of clothes and did not invite any close relatives due to his solicitor's strong advice that he would be sent to prison, but he instead received a suspended sentence.

Donohue has a son and a daughter, both born in Portsmouth during his time at the club. After moving back to North Wales and leaving professional football, he became a plasterer.

== Career statistics ==
=== Club ===
As of end May 2022

Club statistics
Club	Season	League			National Cup		League Cup		Other		Total	
Club	Season	Division	Apps	Goals	Apps	Goals	Apps	Goals	Apps	Goals	Apps	Goals
Holyhead Hotspur	2011–12	Welsh Alliance League	12	3	0	0	0	0	3	1	15	4
Caernarfon Town	2012–13	Welsh Alliance League	36	4	0	0	0	0	0	0	36	4
Caernarfon Town	2013–14	Cymru Alliance	24	8	0	0	0	0	0	0	24	8
Caernarfon Town	Total		60	12	0	0	0	0	0	0	60	12
Sutton Coldfield Town	2014–15	NPL Division One South	37	1	0	0	0	0	0	0	37	1
Chesterfield	2015–16	League One	17	0	2	0	0	0	1 (Note: Appearance(s) in EFL Trophy)	0	20	0
Chesterfield	2016–17	League One	37	1	2	0	1	0	2	0	42	1
Chesterfield	2017–18	League Two	2	0	0	0	1	0	0	0	3	0
Chesterfield	Total		56	1	4	0	2	0	3	0	65	1
Portsmouth	2017–18	League One	32	0	0	0	0	0	3	0	35	0
Portsmouth	2018–19	League One	10	0	2	0	0	0	2	1	14	1
Portsmouth	Total		42	0	2	0	0	0	5	1	49	1
Mansfield Town	2019–20	League Two	0	0	0	0	0	0	1	0	1	0
Swindon Town	2019–20	League Two	5	0	1	0	0	0	0	0	6	0
Swindon Town	2020–21	League One	10	0	0	0	0	0	1	0	11	0
Barrow	2020–21	League Two	4	0	0	0	0	0	0	0	4	0
Caernarfon Town	2021–22	Cymru Premier	27	3	3	0	0	0	0	0	30	3
Career total			253	20	10	0	2	0	13	2	278	22

=== International ===
As of 30 June 2011

Ynys Môn
Year	Apps	Goals
2011	4	0
Total	4	0
