= Caernarfon Wanderers F.C. =

Football club based in Gwynedd

Caernarfon Wanderers
- Full name: Caernarfon Wanderers Football Club
- Founded: 2007
- Dissolved: 2012
- Ground: Cae Top Playing Fields
- 2011–12: Welsh Alliance League Division One, 16th of 16
Home colours	Away colours

Caernarfon Wanderers F.C. was a Welsh football club based in Caernarfon, Gwynedd. The team last played in the Welsh Alliance League Division One, which was at the third tier of the Welsh football league system.

The club have competed in the Welsh Cup, last doing so in the 2011–12 season, losing in the second qualifying round to Bethesda Athletic.

== History ==
Caernarfon Wanderers was founded in 2007, aiming to save the Cae Top Playing Fields in Caernarfon.

In their first season, the club won the Caernarfon & District League Division Two, getting promoted to Division One, which they then won, getting promoted to the Gwynedd League. The club then finished 5th in the Gwynedd League, and were promoted to the Welsh Alliance League. The club won the Welsh Alliance League Division Two at the first attempt, gaining promotion to Division One.

However, in 2012, the club finished bottom of the Welsh Alliance League Division One, and after failing to secure the funds for permanent changing rooms, the club folded.

== Honours ==
- Welsh Alliance League Division Two – Champions: 2010–11
- Caernarfon & District League Division One – Champions: 2008–09
- Caernarfon & District League Division Two – Champions: 2007–08
