= Beaumaris Town F.C. =

Former association football club in Wales

Beaumaris Town
- Full name: Beaumaris Town Football Club
- Dissolved: 2018
- Ground: Beach Road, Bangor
- League: Gwynedd League
- 2017–18: 11th (of 12)

Beaumaris Town Football Club was a Welsh football team based in Beaumaris, Anglesey, Wales. They were four-time champions of the Anglesey League. The club played in the Gwynedd League from 2002–03 till the end of the 2017–18 season, when they left the league.

Recent standout players include Anthony Hughes, Shaun Monument, Andy Clarke, David Clarke, Robbie Jones, Gareth Davies and Danny Wade.

They played in many cup finals during a good patch for the club, between 2009 & 2012, when they played in 4 finals, two of which they won. Their first cup success in the period was a 3–1 win against Bangor University in the Eryri Shield with Andy Clarke scoring 2 and Darren Ishmael with a single. Andy Clarke subsequently picked up the Man of the Match award. The very next season they were in a three-way battle for the league but lost out on the last day to Bro Goronwy who won the game 2–1, Beaumaris solitary goal coming from Gareth Davies who at the time put Beaumaris in the lead. Three cup finals followed, the first against Glantraeth in the NWCFA cup hosted by Holyhead, the game was drawn 1-1, Andy Clarke scored for Beaumaris after they had fallen behind in the 1st half. Glantraeth would eventually win the game on penalties after failure from the spot for Robbie Jones and David Roberts. Final number 2 was to come against Holyhead in the Gwynedd Shield hosted by Bangor City. A thrilling game was won by Beaumaris after extra time 5–3, three goals coming from Gareth Davies, and one each from Andy Clarke & David Roberts. Gareth Davies went on to pick up the Man of the Match award.

Final number 3 came against previous cup final winners against Beau in Glantraeth in the Gwynedd Cup hosted by Holyhead. Glantraeth won the game 3–2 after extra time, goals for Beaumaris coming from Andy Clarke and Shaun Monument.

It was after this season half the squad decided to play their football at other clubs, most of which moved to rivals Glantraeth where they went on to enjoy success in winning the league and cup double with them next season.

== Honours ==
- Gwynedd League
  - Runners-up: 2002–03
- Anglesey League
  - Champions (4): 1924–25, 1977–78, 1978–79, 2001–02
- Dargie Cup
  - Winners (4): 1925–26, 1929–30, 1947–48, 1977–78
- Elias Cup
  - Winners (2): 1971–72, 1972–73
- Megan Cup
  - Winners (3): 1938–39, 1976–77, 2001–02
- North Wales Coast FA Junior Challenge Cup
  - Winners (2): 1924–25, 2006–07
  - Runners up: 2010–2011
- Eryri Shield
  - Winners: 2009–2010
- Gwynedd Cup
  - Runners Up: 2010–2011
- Gwynedd Shield
  - Winners: 2010-2011
