= Llandegfan =

Village in Anglesey, Wales

Coordinates: 53.239078°N 4.151701°W

- Location within Anglesey
- OS grid reference: SH565735
- Community: Cwm Cadnant
- Principal area: Anglesey
- Preserved county: Gwynedd
- Country: Wales
- Sovereign state: United Kingdom
- Post town: MENAI BRIDGE
- Postcode district: LL59
- Police: North Wales
- Fire: North Wales
- Ambulance: Welsh
- UK Parliament: Ynys Môn
- Senedd Cymru – Welsh Parliament: Bangor Conwy Môn

Llandegfan (Welsh: [ɬan'dɛɡvan]; Welsh pronunciation; meaning The Church of St Tegfan) is a village on the east of island of Anglesey in Wales. It is part of the community of Cwm Cadnant, and was its own community until 1984. Llandegfan's population is around 1,580.

== History and description ==
The original village, Hen Llandegfan or Hen Landegfan, was on the ancient way from the crossing of the Menai Strait at Menai Bridge via Pentraeth to Beaumaris. St Tegfan's Church, the mother church of Beaumaris, has been greatly restored.

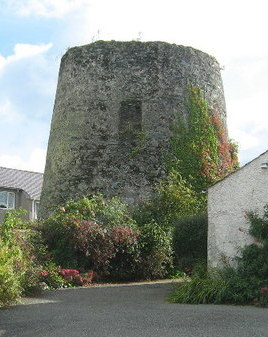
Llandegfan windmill

Llandegfan has expanded greatly in recent decades and is continuing to expand in the 21st century, notably in the extension to the Mill Lodge estate and along Lon Ganol. Almost all of this expansion is centred on the modern village centre to the south and east of the old windmill. The village is expanding for various reasons, including its proximity to Bangor, where many of the residents of Llandegfan work, and to the A55, and the views from the village over to the mountains of Snowdonia.

In the outskirts of the village is Bryn Mel Manor, built in 1899 as a summer house for the owners of the White Star Line and standing in about 10 acres (4 ha) of wood and parkland. After the death of the last family owner, the building was derelict for many years, before being converted into a nursing home. Financial constraints meant much of the original land was sold, and in the latter years the home struggled to stay open. In July 2011 it was announced that the home was to close and the building redeveloped into luxury flats and apartments. Despite its modern history, the external features of the building have changed little but many of the internal features have been lost.

Llandegfan formerly had a football club in the Anglesey League, Llandegfan F.C.

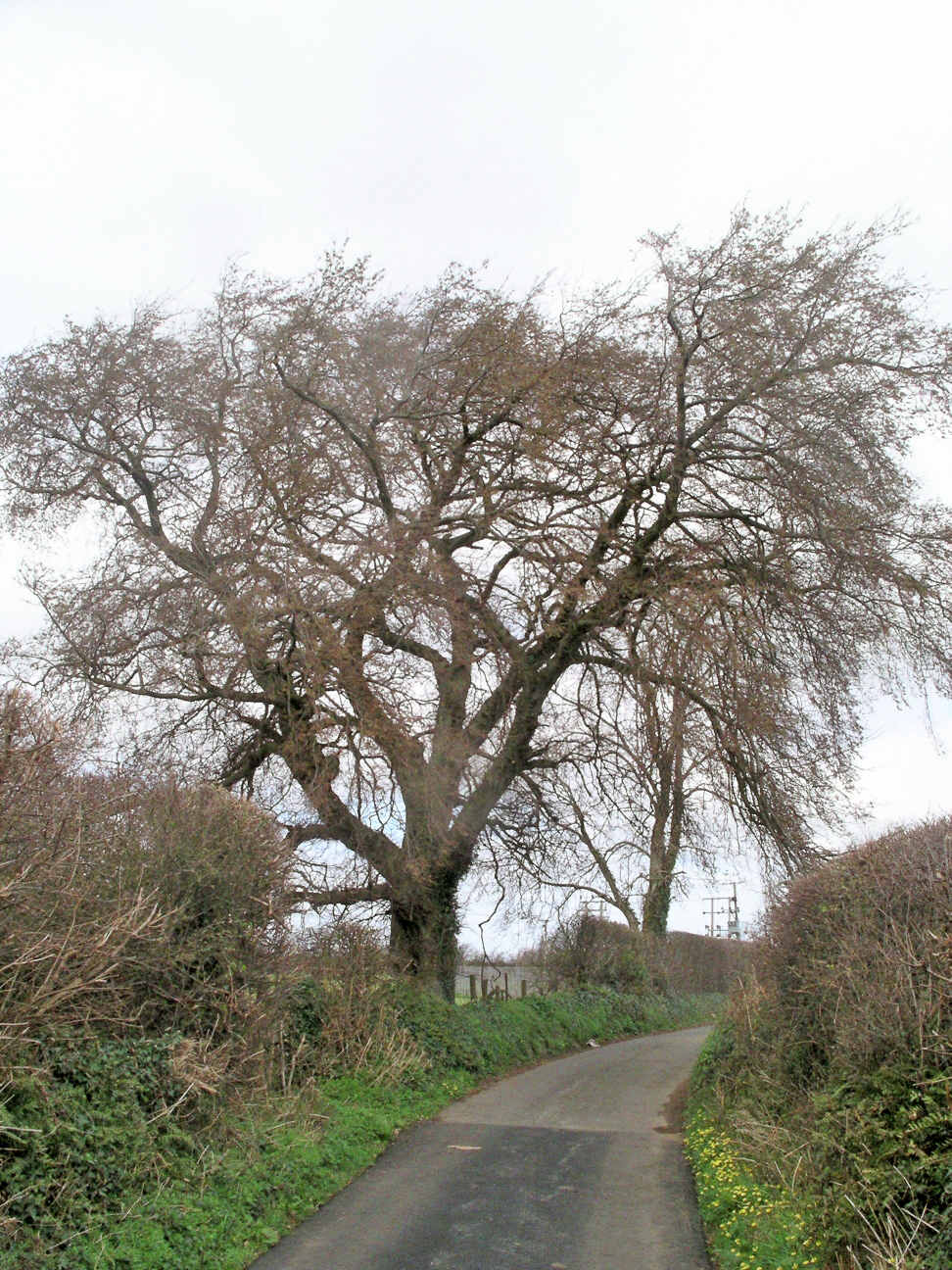
White Elm at Llandegfan

A rare European White Elm Ulmus laevis grows near the village.

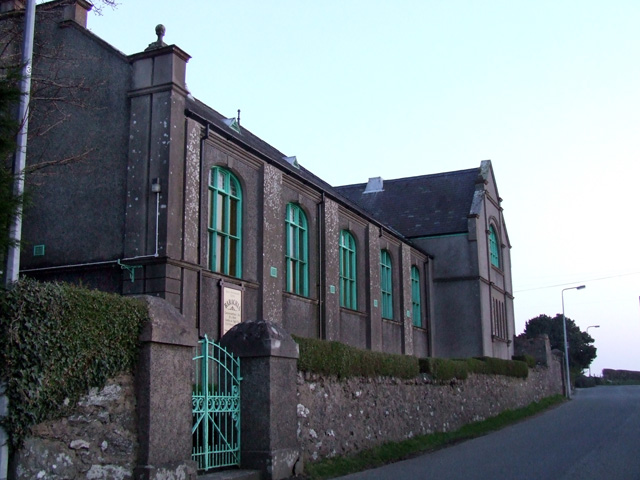
Capel Barachia, Hen Llandegfan

The village is in two parts: the original village, now called Hen Llandegfan, around the chapel (Capel Barachia). The other, much larger, part grew to the south of the old village and next to the A545. In 2003 a new estate, Gwel y Llan, was built in the village; this is the most recent development there. There is a primary school with over 120 children. The population of the village in 2010 was 927.

The parish hall in the village is used for meetings, charity events, and the youth club. Outside is a play park.

== Notable people ==
- Robert ap Huw (ca.1580 – 1665), a Welsh harpist, music copyist and became a gentleman farmer here
- Louise Elliott (born 1969), broadcaster and journalist, brought up in Llandegfan
- Aled Jones (born 1970), singer and radio and TV presenter; lived in Llandegfan as a child
- Rhun ap Iorwerth (born 1972), journalist and politician; lived in Llandegfan as a child

== Bibliography ==
- Davies, John; Jenkins, Nigel; Menna, Baines; Lynch, Peredur I., eds. (2008). The Welsh Academy Encyclopaedia of Wales. Cardiff: University of Wales Press. ISBN 978-0-7083-1953-6.
