= Bro Goronwy F.C. =

Association football club in Wales

Bro Goronwy
- Full name: CPD Bro Goronwy FC
- Nickname: Bro
- Ground: Cae Nerys
- Chairman: Gareth Perry
- Manager: Robbie Jones
- 2018–19: Gwynedd League, 6th of 15

Bro Goronwy Football Club (Welsh: Clwb Pêl Droed Bro Goronwy) is a Welsh football team based in Moelfre, Anglesey, Wales. The club previously played in the Gwynedd League and Anglesey League. The club is named after one of the 18th century's most notable Welsh poets, Goronwy Owen.

== History ==
The club were originally called Benllech & District, playing in the Anglesey League from the 1974–75 season. They were one of founder members of the Gwynedd League in the 1983–84 season. They finished fifth in the league as well as reaching the final of the inaugural Eryri Shield cup competition. The club decided to return to the Anglesey League and renamed to CPD Bro Goronwy FC but had to enter the second division of the Anglesey League. Keeping most of their Gwynedd League side they won the Division Two title. They also reached the finals in the Dargie and Megan cups, losing on both occasions.

The club were promoted to the Gwynedd League for the 1987–88 season and finished 5th. The team folded at the end of this season.

The club reformed for the 2003–04 season as a Sunday league team and switched to Saturday football for the 2006–07 season, joining the Anglesey League.

In 2009–10 the club were champions of the Anglesey League and gained promotion to the Gwynedd League where they were crowned champions in the first season in the league. Ahead of the 2013–14 season the club resigned from the league, citing inability to attract players. The team re-joined the Anglesey League and saw further league success being crowned as league champions again at the end of the 2015–16 season.

The club were announced as members of the newly formed North Wales Coast West Football League Division One ahead of the 2020–21 season and were then moved up to the Premier Division after Barmouth chose to move to the Mid Wales Football League. The season was subsequently cancelled due to the COVID-19 pandemic.

In May 2021 the club announced that they were going to be taking a year out and would not be competing in the league for the 2021–22 season. The following May they confirmed they would return for the 2022–23 season as a senior team.

== Honours ==
=== Leagues ===
- Gwynedd League
  - Champions: 2010–11
  - Runners-up: 2017–18
- Anglesey League Division One
  - Champions: 2009–10, 2015–16
  - Runners-up: 1986–87, 2007–08, 2008–09
- Anglesey League Division Two – Champions:1982–83, 1984–85

=== Cups ===
- North Wales Coast FA Intermediate Cup
  - Winners: 2012–13
- North Wales Coast FA Junior Challenge Cup
  - Winners: 1986–87, 2016–17, 2018–19
- Dargie Cup
  - Winners: 2007–08
  - Runners-up: 1984–85, 1985–86
- Megan Cup
  - Winners: x 2
  - Runners-up: 1984–85, 1986–87
- Elias Cup
  - Winners: 2015–16
- Thomas and Williams Cup
  - Winners: 2009–10
- Bwlch Car Boot Trophy
  - Winners: 2014–15, 2015–16
- Bob Owen Memorial Shield
  - Winners: 2017–18
- Eryri Shield
  - Runners-up: 1983–84
- Gwynedd Cup
  - Runners-up: 1987–88
