= Bangor City 1876 F.C. =

Association football club in North Wales

Coordinates: 53°12′53″N 4°10′39″W

Bangor City 1876 FC
- Full name: CPD Dinas Bangor City 1876 FC
- Founded: 2019; 7 years ago
- Ground: Nantporth, Bangor
- Capacity: 3,000 (1,100 seated)
- Chairman: Nick Pritchard
- Manager: Huw Grifffiths
- League: Cymru North
- 2025–26: Ardal NW League, 1st of 16 (promoted)
- Website: https://bangorcityfootballclub.com
colours	colours

Bangor City 1876 Football Club (Welsh: Clwb Pêl-Droed Dinas Bangor 1876) is a Welsh football club in Bangor, Gwynedd, who play in the Cymru North.

The club founded in 2019 by Bangor City supporters, originally known as Bangor 1876 until adopting its current name in 2025.

== History ==
=== Formation of the club ===
The club was formed in 2019 as Bangor 1876 F.C. by the Supporters Association of Bangor City F.C.. The Supporters Association voted overwhelmingly to create a breakaway club in order to protect football in the city, given the club's recent history under Vaughan Sports Management. They stated, “We want fans to reconnect with each other and restore the pride and feeling of being a supporter of our historic club. The new club is a creative and positive solution for an ever-changing and precarious situation. We are not disowning Bangor City FC or its history, the club is OURS, it belongs to the fans and local community. “Owners” will come and go but the people remain. Keep the faith.”

An application was submitted to the Football Association of Wales to enter the new club in the Welsh football league system, and a Supporters' trust set up. A women's team, Bangor 1876 Women's FC, was also formed. The club played their home matches at Treborth, Bangor University.

=== First season ===
The club competed in the tier five Gwynedd League for the 2019–20 season. The first manager was Mel Jones, with Dylan Williams as his assistant. Former Llandudno and Caernarfon Town manager Iwan Williams was also appointed as Director of Football.

The club's inaugural match was against fellow fan-owned team FC United of Manchester, and the first competitive match was in the Gwynedd League, a 4–1 away victory against Ogwen Tigers on 10 August 2019. A successful first season saw the club leading the league, with a 100 per cent win ratio, when the season was suspended due to the COVID-19 pandemic in March 2020. They were crowned league champions following the announcement that all Welsh football seasons would finish with a table decided on a points per game basis.

=== Second season ===
The club joined the newly formed North Wales Coast West Football League in the tier four Premier Division in 2020. The inaugural season was cancelled due to the ongoing pandemic and instead started in August 2021. The club finished as divisional runners up in the 2021–22 season and was promoted to the tier three Ardal NW League for the 2022–23 season. The club rounded the season off by winning the North Wales Coast West Football League Premier Cup, beating Bodedern Athletic 3–0 in the final.

=== Promotion to the second tier ===
The club won their opening match in the third tier against Rhydymwyn FC 8–1. They finished the season in second place and hence qualified for the Ardal Northern play–off final. The club won the play–off final and secured promotion to the tier two Cymru North.

In December 2024, supporters voted to rename the club to Bangor City 1876 FC. The new name was introduced for the 2025–26 season. The last day of the season saw the club lose to Ruthin Town in a match that could have seen either club relegated, with the club's spell in the second tier coming to an end with relegation confirmed. The following season saw success for the club as they finished the season as Ardal NW champions, gaining promotion back to the Cymru North. The season also ended in cup success with the club also winning the FAW Trophy and the Ardal North Cup.

== Current squad ==
As of 26 September 2026

Note: Flags indicate national team as defined under FIFA eligibility rules; some limited exceptions apply. Players may hold more than one non-FIFA nationality.

No.	Pos.	Nation	Player
1	GK	ENG	John Danby
2	DF	WAL	Cai Powell-Roberts
3	DF	ENG	Isaac Godwin (on loan from The New Saints)
4	MF	WAL	Cai Owen
5	DF	WAL	Guto Williams
7	MF	WAL	Josh Carey
8	MF	WAL	James Barry
9	FW	SCO	Declan McManus
10	FW	WAL	Corrig McGonigle
11	FW	TUR	Haci Ozlu
12	DF	ENG	Blaine Hudson

No.	Pos.	Nation	Player
13	GK	ENG	Josh Davies
14	MF	WAL	Jack Burman
15	DF	WAL	Max Purvis
16	MF	WAL	Thomas Creamer
17	MF	WAL	Dion Donohue
20	MF	WAL	Jack Smith
21	MF	WAL	Joshua Roberts
22	FW	WAL	Connor John
23	FW	WAL	Connor Evans
31	DF	Isle of Man	Adam Long

=== Development Team ===
The following players have been included in first team match day squads this season.

Note: Flags indicate national team as defined under FIFA eligibility rules; some limited exceptions apply. Players may hold more than one non-FIFA nationality.

No.	Pos.	Nation	Player
—	GK	WAL	Celt Jones
—	GK	WAL	Owen Griffiths

No.	Pos.	Nation	Player
—	DF	WAL	Morgan Johnson
—	FW	WAL	Sam Parry

== Club staff ==
- Manager: Huw Grifffiths
- Assistant manager: Steve Evans
- First team coach: Martyn Jones
- First team goalkeeper coach: Adam Lavender
- Director of Football: Lee Dixon
- Head of Youth Development: Robbie Anderson
- Football Community Liaison Officer: Ash Dacre

== Honours ==
- FAW Trophy – Winners: 2025–26
- Ardal NW League – Champions: 2025–26
- Ardal NW League – Play-off winners: 2022–23
- Ardal North Cup – Winners: 2025–26
- Gwynedd League – Champions: 2019–20
- North Wales Coast West Football League Premier Division Cup – Winners: 2021–22
- Brian Lomax Trophy – Champions: 2024

== Records ==
- Record home league win: 14–0 vs Bethesda Athletic, Gwynedd League, 15 October 2019
- Record home cup win: 13–0 vs Llanystumdwy, Bob Owen Memorial Shield First Round, 16 November 2019
- Record away league win: 0–11 v Llanystumdwy, Gwynedd League, 1 February 2020
- Record away cup win: 0–12 v Conwy Borough Swifts, Welsh Cup, 23 August 2025
- Record home league attendance: 2,814 vs Caerau Ely, Welsh Cup Quarter Final, 31 January 2026
