= Bryngwran Bulls F.C. =

Defunct association football club in Wales

Bryngwran Bulls
- Full name: CPD Bryngwran Bulls FC
- Dissolved: 2019
- Ground: Cae Ysgol
- 2018–19: Anglesey League, 1st

Bryngwran Bulls Football Club (Welsh: Clwb Pêl Droed Bryngwran Bulls) were a Welsh football team based in Bryngwran, Anglesey, Wales.

== History ==
The team were reformed in 2010 after a ten-year gap. Playing as a Sunday league side in the North Gwynedd Sunday League, the club won two league championships, two Presidents Cups and the League Cup. winners

The club joined the Anglesey League for the 2016–17 season, and were league champions in the 2018–19 season.

In August 2019 the club merged with Trearddur Bay United to form Trearddur Bay Bulls.

== Honours ==
- Anglesey League
  - Champions (1): 2018–19
- North Wales Coast FA Junior Challenge Cup
  - Runners-up (1): 2018–19
- Dargie Cup
  - Winners (1): 2017–18
- Lucas Oil Cup
  - Winners (1): 2017–18

=== Sunday league ===
- Presidents Cup:
  - Winners (2):
  - Runners-up: 2011–12
