= C.P.D. Aberffraw =

Association football club in Wales

Aberffraw
- Full name: Clwb Pêl-droed Aberffraw
- Nickname: Berffro
- Founded: 2008; 18 years ago
- Ground: Cae Cynlas, Bryn Du, LL63 5SN
- League: North Wales Coast West Division One
- 2025–26: North Wales Coast West Division One, 1st of 12 (promoted)
- Website: https://www.pitchero.com/clubs/cpdaberffraw
Home colours	Away colours

C.P.D. Aberffraw (Welsh: Clwb Pêl Droed Aberffraw, locally referred to as Berffro) is a football team representing the historic village of Aberffraw on the island of Anglesey. They compete in the North Wales Coast West Division One.

Despite their name, the club is actually based a couple of miles outside of Aberffraw, at Cae Cynlas in the nearby village of Bryn Du. Cae Cynlas was chosen to host several games during the 2019 Inter Games Football Tournament.

They wear a yellow home shirt, with black shorts and socks.

== History ==
Aberffraw first joined the Anglesey League for the 1946–47 season, and won the league title in 1952–53 and 1963–64. Aberffraw then left the league but returned from 1967 to 1975. For three seasons they were known as Aberffraw United. For 1976–77 they again joined the league, and were members from 1982 to 1987. This Aberffraw club also won five Dargie Cups, three Megan Cups, and three Elias Cups.

Aberffraw Football Club was founded in August 2008, joining the North Gwynedd & Anglesey Sunday League. In their second season they were Division One champions. In 2010 it was decided that the club should move into Saturday football, and they joined the Anglesey League. In 2014 they reached the NWCFA Junior Cup final, but lost to Y Felinheli. In 2014–15 the club achieved promotion to the Gwynedd League, and in their third season there they gained promotion to the Welsh Alliance League Division Two.

From 2015–16 to 2019–20, Aberffraw achieved many cup upsets against higher tier teams.

In 2020 the club were announced as members of the newly-formed North Wales Coast West Football League, in the Premier Division. Its first season (2020–21) was cancelled due to the COVID-19 pandemic and they struggled after the league started in 2021–22, ending in a winless season in 2024–25. This caused them to be relegated to Division One, where they would spend just one season, winning the title with an unbeaten record.

== Honours ==
=== Previous club (1946–1987) ===
- Anglesey League
  - Champions: 1952–53, 1963–64
- Dargie Cup
  - Winners: 1948–49, 1949–50, 1951–52, 1962–63, 1963–64
- Megan Cup
  - Winners: x3
- Elias Cup
  - Winners: x3

=== Current club (2008–present) ===
- North Wales Coast West Football League Division One
  - Champions: 2025–26
- NWCFA Junior Cup
  - Finalists: 2013–14
