= Newborough F.C. =

Former association football club in Wales

Newborough
- Full name: Newborough Football Club
- Dissolved: 2013
- Ground: Cae Cob
- League: Anglesey League
- 2012–13: 11th (of 13)

Newborough Football Club was a Welsh football team based in Newborough, Anglesey, Wales. The team saw considerable success in the 1950s and 1960s and shares the joint record for the number of Anglesey League titles. The club achieved at least 33 trophies during its existence.

== History ==
The club was formed in the 1920s, first appearing in the Anglesey League tables for the 1929–30 season. They won the first of their league titles in 1930–31. The following season they joined the Bangor & District League and for the next three seasons they played in this league with finishing a high of second in the 1932–33 season.

The club's most successful period was in the 1950s, where they claimed 10 championships and cup titles and the 1960s where they gained 18 titles and cup wins.

The remainder of the 1970s and 1980s were less productive with many a season where the club did not even enter the league. The club eventually ceased as a "Saturday" club at the end of the 1989–90 season.

In 1992 a group of men came together and reformed as a Sunday League team. They were a member of the North Gwynedd and Ynys Mon Sunday League where the club's highlight was a league and cup double in 2002–03.

In 2012 it was reported that the future of the club was in doubt over the lack of a permanent playing field, which saw the club having to move pitch each season.

The club returned to the Anglesey League for the 2012–13 season and started the 2013–14 season but withdrew with the club's last league match being a 4–3 victory over Holy Isle on 14 September.

== Honours ==
- Anglesey League
  - Champions (9): 1930–31, 1954–55, 1955–56, 1957–58, 1960–61, 1964–65, 1965–66, 1966–67, 1968–69
  - Runners-up (4): 1956–57, 1962–63, 1963–64, 1969–70
- Bangor & District League
  - Runners-up (1): 1932–33
- Dargie Cup
  - Winners (9): 1955–57, 1956–57, 1957–58, 1961–62, 1964–65, 1965–66, 1966–67, 1971–72, 1972–73
  - Runners-up (2): 1959–60, 1967–68
- Elias Cup
  - Winners (6): 1954–55, 1965–66, 1966–67, 1967–68, 1968–69, 1969–70
  - Runners-up (8) 1956–57, 1957–58, 1960–61, 1962–63, 1963–64, 1964–65, 1970–71, 1972–73
- Megan Cup
  - Winners (6): 1950–51, 1956–57, 1958–59, 1960–61, 1965–66, 1968–69
  - Runners-up (5): 1930–31, 1963–64, 1966–67, 1969–70, 1971–72
- North Wales Amateur Cup
  - Winners (1): 1960–61
  - Runners-up (1): 1965–66
- North Wales Coast FA Junior Challenge Cup
  - Winners (2): 1956–57, 1957–58
  - Runners-up (3): 1955–56, 1959–60, 1960–61

== Sunday league honours ==
- North Gwynedd and Ynys Mon League
  - Champions (1): 2002–03
- North Gwynedd and Ynys Mon League Cup
  - Winners (1): 2002–03
  - Runners-up (1): 1997–98
