= Mynydd Llandegai F.C. =

Association football club in Wales

Mynydd Llandegai
- Full name: CPD Mynydd Llandegai
- Ground: Penrhiw
- Manager: Iwan Morris
- League: North Wales Coast West Premier Division
- 2025–26: North Wales Coast West Premier Division, 14th of 16

Mynydd Llandegai Football Club (Welsh: Clwb Pêl Droed Mynydd Llandegai) is a Welsh football team based in Mynydd Llandegai, Gwynedd, North Wales. They play in the North Wales Coast West Premier Division.

== History ==
The club were Caernarfon & District League champions in the 2012–13 season and were promoted to the Gwynedd League in 2013–14. They were promoted in two successive seasons to the Welsh Alliance League Division Two in 2014–15, and Division One in 2015–16.

The club joined the newly formed North Wales Coast Football League in the West Premier Division when announced in 2020.

== Honours ==
- Caernarfon & District League – Champions: 2012–13
- Caernarfon & District League Division One – Runners-up: 2009–10
- Caernarfon & District League Division Two – Runners-up: 2007–08
- Caernarfon & District Super Cup – Winners: 2012–13
- North Wales Coast FA Junior Challenge Cup – Winners: 2009–10
