= Llangoed F.C. =

Association football club in Wales

CPD Llangoed FC
- Full name: Clwb Pêl-Droed Llangoed Football Club
- Nickname: The Puffins
- Founded: 1947
- Ground: Tyddyn Paun
- Chairman: Owen Williams
- Manager: Vinny Walker
- League: North Wales Coast West Division One
- 2024–25: North Wales Coast West Division One, 5th of 12

Llangoed Football Club (Welsh: Clwb Pêl Droed Llangoed) is a Welsh football team based in Llangoed, Anglesey, Wales. The team play in the North Wales Coast West Division One. Officially known as Llangoed & District, the club are two-times champions of the Anglesey League and have also seen success across a range of cup competitions in North Wales.

== History ==
The club previously played in the Anglesey League before moving up to the Gwynedd League. In 2020 the team was accepted into the Division One of the new North Wales Coast West Football League.

== Honours ==
Club honours include the following:

=== League ===
- Anglesey League Division One
  - Champions (2): 1972–73, 1988–89
- Anglesey League Division Two
  - Champions: 1987–88
- Anglesey League Division Three
  - Champions: 1980–81

=== Cups ===
- Bwlch Car Boot Trophy
  - Winners (1): 2016–17
- Dargie Cup
  - Winners (5): 1969–70, 1970–71, 1984–85, 1988–89, 2016–17
- Elias Cup
  - Winners (2): 1998–99, 2001–02
- J W Lees Shield
  - Winners (1): 1980–81
- Lucas Oil Cup
  - Winners (1): 2015–16
- Megan Cup
  - Winners (4): 1963–64, 1971–72, 1972–73, 1999–2000
- Thomas and Williams Cup
  - Winners (1): 2003–04
- North Wales Amateur Cup
  - Winners (1): 1970–71
- North Wales Coast FA Junior Challenge Cup
  - Winners (2): 1970–71, 2003–04
