= Trearddur Bay F.C. =

Defunct association football club in Wales

Trearddur Bay
- Full name: Trearddur Bay F.C.
- Ground: Lon Isallt
- League: Ardal NW League
- 2025–26: Ardal NW League, 10th of 16

Trearddur Bay Football Club is a Welsh football team based in Trearddur, Anglesey, Wales. The club plays in the Ardal NW League.

As Trearddur Bay United they rose from the Anglesey League in 2008–09 to winning Division One of the Welsh Alliance League at the end of the 2015–16 season. Trearddur Bay United merged with Bryngwran Bulls in 2019 to create Trearddur Bay Bulls.

== History ==
Trearddur Bay first appears in the 1933–34 Anglesey League, finishing level on points with champions Llangefni. They appeared again after World War II.

Trearddur Bay again appear in the league from 1980 until withdrawing during the 2000–01 season.

Trearddur Bay United joined Saturday league football for 2008–09, and saw success in their first season, winning the North Wales Coast FA Junior Challenge Cup as well as the Anglesey League's Dargie Cup and Thomas & Williams Cup. The following season saw them obtain more cup success, retaining the Dargie Cup and winning the Elias Cup. The 2010–11 season saw them win the Anglesey League and three cup competitions, and gain promotion to the Gwynedd League.

The club's first season saw them finish league runners-up and win the Cwpan Gwynedd. The following season they went one better and finished champions of the league, gaining promotion to the Welsh Alliance League Division Two. The club finished third in the first season in the league and third again the followings season, gaining promotion to Division One. The next season saw the club win Division One at their first attempt but they were denied promotion to the Cymru Alliance, as their ground did not meet the required criteria to qualify for promotion.

In June 2017 a new management team of former manager, Chris Davies and Nathan Owen took over. The following July the club withdrew from the Welsh Alliance League, planning to take a year out.

In August 2019 the club merged with Bryngwran Bulls to form Trearddur Bay Bulls. This was a short lived affair and the club once again folded in 2020.

The club finally combined its three sections into one (ladies, juniors, men's) and relaunched under the one heading of Trearddur Bay Football Club. The club has grown and now offers football to Boys, Girls, The disabled and senior men's. The club returned to senior football for the 2022–23 season and were crowned champions of Division One of the North Wales Coast West Football League followed by back-to-back wins becoming Premier Division champions in the 2023–24 season. This gained them promotion to the Ardal North West.

Campbell Harrison took over as manager in May 2025.

Footage circulated on social media of their player Tom Taylor elbowing Porthmadog player Danny Brookwell in the face in their Ardal North West game on 17 January 2026. He was released by the club and released on conditional bail after North Wales Police arrested him on suspicion of assault. The Football Association of Wales also reviewed the incident. On 22 January 2026 it was reported that secretary Chris Davies left the club, but says it was unrelated to the incident. In May 2026 it was reported that Taylor pleaded guilty of causing actual bodily harm and received a 24 weeks jail term, suspended for a year.

In March 2026, manager Campbell Harrison left the club, with them 10th in the Ardal North West. He had led the team to its first ever Welsh Cup quarter-final.

Goalkeeper Paul Pritchard took over as player-manager for the rest of the season, and was joined by Mark Hughes from Bethesda Athletic as part of his management team for the 2026-27 season.

== Honours ==
- Welsh Alliance League Division One
  - Champions (1): 2015–16
- North Wales Coast West Football League Premier Division
  - Champions (1): 2023–24
- North Wales Coast West Football League Division One
  - Champions (1): 2022–23
- Gwynedd League
  - Champions (1): 2012–13
  - Runners-up (1): 2011–12
- Anglesey League
  - Champions (3): 2010–11
- North Wales Coast FA Junior Challenge Cup
  - Winners (1): 2008–09
  - Finalists (1): 2014–15 (reserves)
- Dargie Cup
  - Winners (4): 1991–92, 2008–09, 2009–10, 2010–11
- Gwynedd Cup (Cwpan Gwynedd)
  - Winners (1): 2011–12
- Megan Cup
  - Winners (2): 1990–91, 2010–11
- Elias Cup
  - Winners (1): 2009–10
- Thomas and Williams Cup
  - Winners (2): 2008–09, 2010–11
- North Wales Coast West Division One Cup
  - Winners: 2022–23
