= Pentraeth F.C. =

Association football club in Wales

Pentraeth
- Full name: CPD Pentraeth FC
- Ground: Bryniau Field
- Manager: Marv Walsh
- League: North Wales Coast West Division One
- 2025–26: North Wales Coast West Division One, 11th of 12

Pentraeth Football Club (Welsh: Clwb Pêl Droed Pentraeth) is a Welsh football team based in Pentraeth, Anglesey, Wales. The team play in the North Wales Coast West Division One.

== History ==
The club were Anglesey League champions in 2012–13, gaining promotion to the Gwynedd League for the 2013–14 season. They finished the season in eighth place before the following season joining the Welsh Alliance League Division Two.

At the end of the 2019–20 season which was curtailed by the COVID-19 pandemic, the club finished bottom of Division Two of the Welsh Alliance League with only three wins.

The club joined the newly formed North Wales Coast Football League in the West Premier Division when announced in 2020. In 2025 they were relegated to Division One.

== Honours ==
- Anglesey League – Champions: 2012–13
- Welsh League North Division III - (Anglesey League) – Runners-up: 1953–54
- Dargie Cup – Winners: 2012–13
