= Ardal North Cup =

- Founded: 2020
- Current champions: Bangor City 1876
- 2025–26

The Lock Stock Ardal Northern League Cup is a football knockout tournament involving teams who play in the tier three Ardal North East and North West Leagues, administered by the Football Association of Wales.

== Competition history ==
The first season of the competition was meant to be the 2020–21 season, but the competition was cancelled due to the Coronavirus pandemic. The 2021–22 season saw Caersws crowned as the competition's inaugural winners, beating Mold Alexandra.

== Past winners ==
=== 2020s ===
- 2020–21: – No competition
- 2021–22: – Caersws
- 2022–23: – Denbigh Town
- 2023–24: – Holyhead Hotspur
- 2024–25: – Porthmadog
- 2025–26: – Bangor City 1876

== Details of competition finals ==
| Season | Winners | Score | Runners-up | Date | Venue |
|---|---|---|---|---|---|
| 2021–22 | Caersws | 1-0 | Mold Alexandra | 7 May 2022 | Penycae |
| 2022–23 | Denbigh Town | 6-1 | Bow Street | 20 May 2023 | Caersws |
| 2023–24 | Holyhead Hotspur | 2-1 | Flint Mountain | 30 May 2024 | Maes Tegid, Bala |
| 2024–25 | Porthmadog | 4-1 | Brickfield Rangers | 17 May 2025 | Belle Vue, Rhyl |
| 2025–26 | Bangor City 1876 | 2-1 | Llanuwchllyn | 16 May 2026 | Y Traeth, Porthmadog |

== Number of times by winning clubs since 2020s ==
- Bangor City 1876 – 1 win
- Caersws – 1 win
- Denbigh Town – 1 win
- Holyhead Hotspur – 1 win
- Porthmadog – 1 win

== See also ==
- Ardal South Cup, the corresponding cup for clubs from the two southern Ardal Leagues.
