= North Wales Coast West Football League =

- Founded: 2020
- Country: Wales
- Number of clubs: 28
- Level on pyramid: 4 & 5
- Promotion to: Ardal Leagues
- Domestic cup(s): Intermediate Challenge Cup (Premier); Junior Challenge Cup (First)
- Current champions: Nefyn United (2025–26)

The North Wales Coast West Football League is a football league in Wales, at tiers 4 and 5 of the Welsh football league system in North Wales, founded in 2020. The league is under the control of the North Wales Coast Football Association. The league replaced the former Gwynedd League and Anglesey Leagues, and covers the North West of Wales. A corresponding North Wales Coast East Football League was also established at the same time.

== League history ==
Plans for the new league were discussed in March 2020. There were to be two tiers - the Premier Division – with no more than 16 clubs, at tier 4, with Division One – with no more than 16 clubs, at tier 5.

== Member clubs for 2026–27 season ==
=== Premier League ===
- Aberffraw
- Blaenau Ffestiniog
- Boded
- Bontnewydd
- Cemaes Bay
- Gaerwen
- Gwalchmai
- Llanberis
- Llanrug United
- Llanystumdwy
- Menai Bridge Tigers
- Mynydd Llandegai
- Nantlle Vale
- Penrhyndeudraeth
- Talysarn Celts

=== Division One ===
- Amlwch Town
- Bethesda Rovers
- Caergybi
- Caernarfon Borough
- Cefni
- Deiniolen
- Glantraeth
- Holyhead Town
- Llanfairpwll
- Llangoed
- Llannerchymedd
- Mountain Rangers
- Pentraeth

== Premier League Champions ==
=== 2020s ===
- 2020–21: – Competition not played – Covid-19 pandemic
- 2021–22: – Bodedern Athletic
- 2022–23: – Bethesda Athletic
- 2023–24: – Trearddur Bay
- 2024–25: – Bethesda Athletic
- 2025–26: – Nefyn United

== Division One Champions ==
=== 2020s ===
- 2020–21: – Competition not played – Covid-19 pandemic
- 2021–22: – Llannerch-Y-Medd
- 2022–23: – Trearddur Bay
- 2023–24: – Bontnewydd
- 2024–25: – Blaenau Ffestiniog Amateurs
- 2025–26: – CPD Aberffraw

== Cup Competitions ==
Season	Premier Division	Division One
2020–21	Season void	Season void
2021–22	Bangor 1876	Bethesda Athletic
2022–23	Gwalchmai	Trearddur Bay
2023–24	Llanberis	Bontnewydd
2024–25	Llanberis	Caergybi
2025–26	Nantlle Vale	Holyhead Town
