= Bangor & District League =

- Founded: 1930
- Folded: 1950
- Country: Wales
- Number of clubs: 11
- Last champions: Mountain Rangers (1949–50)
- Most championships: Llechid Celts; Menai Bridge Tigers (2 titles)

The Bangor & District League was a football league covering the Bangor and surrounding areas in North Wales, which ran between 1930 and 1937, and 1945 and 1950. The league was a direct precursor to the Caernarfon & District League that ran between 1950 and 2014.

== League History ==
After the collapse of Welsh National League (North) structure in 1930 junior clubs in north Caernarfonshire were left in an uncertain position. Plans to set up a new league came to fruition and the following clubs featured in the league for the first season of 1930–31, with Llechid Celts being crowned champions.

- Aber
- Bangor Casuals
- Bangor YMCA
- Bethesda Victoria Reserves
- Caernarfon Conservatives
- Glasinfryn Swifts
- Llandegai
- (Llan)Llechid Celts
- Portdinorwic
- Rhiwlas
- Seiont Rovers
- Tregarth

The league ran until 1937 when, with membership reduced to seven clubs, it disbanded. Efforts to revive the league the following year were unsuccessful. Following the Second World War the league reformed as the Gwyrfai League for 1945-46 before reverting to its original name until the end of the 1949–50 season. The competition formally changed the name to the Caernarfon & District League for the 1950–51 season to recognise the new geographical focus of the league.

== Clubs in the final 1949–50 season ==
The following teams featured in the league in the final season played.

- Abersoch Athletic
- Beddgelert
- Bethel
- Caernarfon YMCA
- Cesarea Rovers
- Mountain Rangers
- Nefyn United
- Seiont Rovers
- Talysarn Celts
- Trefor Athletic
- Waenfawr

== League champions ==
The following teams were league champions.

=== 1930s ===
- 1930–31: – Llechid Celts
- 1931–32: – Tregarth
- 1932–33: – Menai Bridge Tigers
- 1933–34: – Menai Bridge Tigers
- 1934–35: – Llanberis
- 1935–36: – Portdinorwic
- 1936–37: – Gaerwen

=== 1940s ===
- 1945–46: – (as the Gwyrfai League) Pwllheli British Legion
- 1946–47: – Llanrug United
- 1947–48: – Bangor Railway Institute
- 1948–49: – Llechid Celts
- 1949–50: – Mountain Rangers

==== Number of titles by club ====
- Llechid Celts — 2
- Menai Bridge Tigers – 2
- Bangor Railway Institute – 1
- Gaerwen – 1
- Llanrug United – 1
- Mountain Rangers – 1
- Portdinorwic – 1
- Pwllheli British Legion – 1
- Tregarth – 1
