= Llanerchymedd F.C. =

Association football club in Wales

Llanerch-y-medd
- Full name: CPD Llanerch-y-medd FC
- Nickname: Llan
- Ground: Tan Parc
- Chairman: Elwyn Hughes
- Manager: Meirion Grieves
- League: North Wales Coast West Premier Division
- 2024–25: North Wales Coast West Premier Division, 12th of 16

Llanerch-y-medd Football Club (Welsh: Clwb Pêl Droed Llannerch-y-medd) is a Welsh football team based in Llannerch-y-medd, Anglesey, Wales. The team play in the North Wales Coast West Premier Division.

== History ==
Llannerchymedd first played in the Anglesey League in 1912–13, and again in 1921–22. Their first trophy was in 1978–79, winning the Elias Cup. In the 1980s the club won two consecutive Anglesey League titles, as well as two Division Two titles. The club also won three consecutive Megan Cups, and the NWCFA Junior Cup in 1984–85.

For a time in the 1990s the club was called Llannerchymedd Bulls, winning the Dargie Cup and two Megan Cups. In the 2000s the club reverted to the name Llannerchymedd, and rejoined the Anglesey League. They won the Thomas and Williams Cup twice in the decade.

In the 2011–12 season they were runners-up in the Anglesey League, finishing 6 points behind Morawelon. That season they also won the Dargie, Megan, and Elias Cups. In the following season they played in the Gwynedd League, and finished third. In their second season in the Gwynedd League, they won a treble, including the league title, Bob Owen Memorial Shield, and the Safeflue Shield.

After their successful 2013–14 season, the club joined the Welsh Alliance League Division Two. The club remained in that league until the end of the 2018–19 season when they resigned from the league and demoted themselves to the Gwynedd League after many of their playing squad left for other clubs.

The 2019–20 season in the Gwynedd League saw the club finish bottom of the table, having amassed zero points from 19 games in a season curtailed due to the COVID-19 pandemic.

They joined the newly formed North Wales Coast West Football League Division One from 2020. In their first season in the league they were league champions, and promoted to the Premier Division. In the next three seasons, they finished 12th three times in a row.

== Honours ==
- North Wales Coast West Football League Division One – Champions (1): 2021–22
- North Wales Coast West Football League Division One Cup – Runners-up: 2021–22
- Gwynedd League – Champions (1): 2013–14
- Anglesey League – Champions (2): 1983–84, 1984–85
- Anglesey League – Division Two Champions (2): 1982–83, 1985–86
- North Wales Coast FA Junior Challenge Cup – Winners: 1984–95
- Dargie Cup – Winners (2): 1985–86, 2011–12
- Dargie Cup – Runners-up: 2008–09
- Megan Cup – Winners (5): 1983–84, 1984–85, 1985–86, 2002–03, 2011–12
- Elias Cup – Winners (2): 1978–79, 2011–12
- Thomas and Williams Cup – Winners (1): 2005–06
