= NWCFA Intermediate Cup =

Association football tournament in Wales

- Founded: 1894
- Region: Wales
- Current champions: Nefyn United (2025–26)
- Most championships: Bangor (8 titles)
- 2025–26

The North Wales Coast FA Intermediate Cup is a football knockout tournament involving teams from in North Wales who play in leagues administered and associated with the North Wales Coast Football Association.

== Previous winners ==
The competition was originally known as the North Wales Coast Amateur Cup ran from 1894 to 1975 with the exception of when the competition was suspended during the war years. For the 1975–76 season it was renamed the North Wales Coast FA Intermediate Cup running until the end of the 1980–81 season. The competition did not run from 1981 until the 2008–09 season when it was reintroduced. It ran again until the 2015–16 season, after which it was suspended again. After a restructure of league football in North Wales, the competition was planned for return for the 2020–21 season but due to the COVID-19 pandemic, the competition was cancelled, instead returning for the 2021–22 season.

=== 1890s ===
- 1894–95: – Bangor
- 1895–96: – Bangor
- 1896–97: – Llandudno Swifts
- 1897–98: – Bangor
- 1898–99: – Bangor
- 1899–1900: – Llandudno

=== 1900s ===
- 1900–01: – Bangor
- 1901–02: – Rhyl
- 1902–03: – Bangor
- 1903–04: – Llandudno
- 1904–05: – Bangor
- 1905–06: – Bangor reserves
- 1906–07: – Holyhead
- 1907–08: – Holyhead
- 1908–09: – Caernarfon
- 1909–10: – Flint

=== 1910s ===
- 1910–11: – Caernarfon
- 1911–12: – Bangor
- 1912–13: – Rhyl
- 1913–14: – Holywell
- 1914–15: – No competition - World War One
- 1915–16: – No competition - World War One
- 1916–17: – No competition - World War One
- 1917–18: – No competition - World War One
- 1918–19: – No competition - World War One–
- 1919–20: – Bagillt

=== 1920s ===
- 1920–21: – Holyhead Railway Institute
- 1921–22: – Holywell
- 1922–23: – Caernarfon
- 1923–24: – Denbigh
- 1924–25: – Penmaenmawr
- 1925–26: – Conway
- 1926–27: – Conway
- 1927–28: – Llanfairfechan
- 1928–29: – Llandudno reserves
- 1929–30: – Bettisfield (Bagillt)

=== 1930s ===
- 1930–31: – Flint Town Amateurs
- 1931–32: – Flint Town Amateurs
- 1932–33: – Flint Town Amateurs
- 1933–34: – Flint Town Amateurs
- 1934–35: – Flint Town
- 1935–36: – Flint Town
- 1936–37: – Buckley Town
- 1937–38: – Portmadoc
- 1938–39: – Buckley Town
- 1939–40: – Flint Athletic

=== 1940s ===
- 1940–41: – No competition - World War Two
- 1941–42: – No competition - World War Two
- 1942–43: – No competition - World War Two
- 1943–44: – No competition - World War Two
- 1944–45: – No competition - World War Two
- 1945–46: – Conwy Borough
- 1946–47: – Caernarfon Town
- 1947–48: – Llandudno
- 1948–49: – Holywell
- 1949–50: – Holyhead Town

=== 1950s ===
- 1950–51: – Connah’s Quay Albion
- 1951–52: – Connah’s Quay Juniors
- 1952–53: – Connah’s Quay Nomads
- 1953–54: – Buckley Wanderers
- 1954–55: – Connah’s Quay Nomads
- 1955–56: – Barmouth
- 1956–57: – Portmadoc
- 1957–58: – Holywell Town
- 1958–59: – Portmadoc
- 1959–60: – Bala Town

=== 1960s ===
- 1960–61: – Newborough
- 1961–62: – Llandudno
- 1962–63: – Portmadoc
- 1963–64: – Peritus
- 1964–65: – Llanberis
- 1965–66: – Buckley Wanderers
- 1966–67: – Ruthin
- 1967–68: – Llanberis Athletic
- 1968–69: – Flint Town United
- 1969–70: – Denbigh Town

=== 1970s ===
- 1970–71: – Llangoed & District
- 1971–72: – Mostyn YMCA
- 1972–73: – Ruthin
- 1973–74: – Nantlle Vale
- 1974–75: – Nantlle Vale
- 1975–76: – Nantlle Vale
- 1976–77: – Flint Town United
- 1977–78: – Caernarfon Town
- 1978–79: – Courtaulds Greenfield
- 1979–80: – Llanberis

=== 1980s ===
- 1980–81: – Connah’s Quay Nomads

=== 2000s ===
- 2008–09: – Greenfield
- 2009–10: – Prestatyn Town reserves

=== 2010s ===
- 2010–11: – Glantraeth
- 2011–12: – Prestatyn Rovers
- 2012–13: – Llansannan
- 2013–14: – Caernarfon Town reserves
- 2014–15: – Prestatyn Sports
- 2015–16: – Llanystumdwy
- 2016–17: – Competition suspended
- 2017–18: – Competition suspended
- 2018–19: – Competition suspended
- 2019–20: – Competition suspended

=== 2020s ===
- 2020–21: – No competition - COVID-19 pandemic
- 2021–22: – Rhyl 1879
- 2022–23: – St Asaph City
- 2023–24: – Gwalchmai
- 2024–25: – Penmaenmawr Phoenix
- 2025–26: – Nefyn United
