= C.P.D. Llanystumdwy =

Football club based in Gwynedd

Llanystumdwy
- Full name: Clwb Pêl-Droed Llanystumdwy
- Founded: 1989
- Ground: Treborth Playing Fields, Bangor
- Manager: Sion Parry
- League: North Wales Coast West Premier Division
- 2025–26: North Wales Coast West Premier Division, 7th of 15
Home colours	Away colours

Clwb Pêl-Droed Llanystumdwy is a Welsh football club based in Llanystumdwy, Gwynedd. The men's team plays in the North Wales Coast West Premier Division, and the club also has a women's team. As of 2024, both teams were managed by Sion Parry.

== Men's team ==
The club was founded in 1989.

In 2006–07, the team were champions of the Caernarfon & District League. Having finished 20 points ahead of second-place, Llanystumdwy were expecting to be promoted to the Gwynedd League, but issues with their ground meant they may not be allowed to be promoted. The club had decided to fold if they were not promoted. They were promoted and from the 2007–08 season they played in the Gwynedd League.

In 2016, the team won the NWCFA Intermediate Cup.

After a restructure of leagues in 2020, they were placed into the North Wales Coast West Football League Division One for the 2020-21 season. The team was promoted to the Premier Division in 2024, after finishing runners-up in Division One.

== Women's team ==
The club formed a women's team in 2020, after plans had started to form a team 12 months earlier. Their first match was a friendly against Bethel, a heavy loss, and for the 2020–21 season they entered the North Wales Women's Football League Championship West Division. In the 2024–25 season they played Wrexham in the FAW Women's Cup, and in 2025–26 they lost 10–0 to Swansea City in the last 16 of the cup.

== Ground ==
The men's team play at Treborth Playing Fields, Bangor University, having previously been based at Parc Dwyfor. As of December 2025, Parc Dwyfor was still used by the women's team.

In May 2007, their ground lacked changing rooms and showers, which threatened their promotion to the Gwynedd League. Dewi Pritchard, club chairman, said that a number of grounds already in the Gwynedd League also did not meet the requirements.

In February 2026, the club received funding towards their goal of making Cae Top in Llanystumdwy the permanent home for all of its teams.

== Honours ==
- Caernarfon & District League - Champions: 2006–07
- NWCFA Intermediate Cup - Winners: 2015–16
