= Anglesey League =

Former Association football league in Wales

- Founded: 1897
- Folded: 2020
- Country: Wales
- Number of clubs: 11
- Level on pyramid: 6
- Promotion to: Gwynedd League
- Domestic cup(s): Dargie Cup; Megan Cup; Bwlch Car Boot Trophy; Elias Cup; Lucas Oil Cup
- Last champions: Cemaes Bay (2019–20)
- Most championships: Gwalchmai; Newborough; Amlwch Town (9 Championships)

The Anglesey Football League was a football league in Anglesey, Wales, and was equivalent to the sixth level of the Welsh football league system in North Wales. The champions were promoted to the Gwynedd League.

The league also ran five cup competitions which are the Lucas Oil Cup, Dargie Cup, Elias Cup, Megan Cup and the Bwlch Car Boot Trophy.

League members also competed in the NWCFA Junior Cup against fellow league members and members from the Caernarfon & District League and the Clwyd Football League.

The league folded in 2020 due to a reorganisation of the Welsh football league pyramid, with many teams joining the North Wales Coast West Football League.

== Member clubs for the final 2019–20 season ==
- Arriva Bangor
- Bodorgan
- Cefni
- Cemaes Bay
- Holyhead Hotspur reserves
- Holyhead Town reserves
- Llandegfan
- Llanfairpwll
- Mountain Rangers
- Pentraeth reserves
- Valley Athletic

== League Champions ==
Information sourced from Welsh Soccer Archive

=== 1890s ===
- 1897–98 – Menai Bridge

=== 1900s ===
- Tables/ league status unknown

=== 1910s ===
- 1910–11 –
- 1911–12 –
- 1912–13 – League running but champions unknown
- 1913–14 –
- 1914–15 – Football suspended due to the First World War
- 1915–16 – Football suspended due to the First World War
- 1916–17 – Football suspended due to the First World War
- 1917–18 – Football suspended due to the First World War
- 1918–19 –
- 1919–20 –

=== 1920s ===
- 1920–21 –
- 1921–22 – Holyhead Alexandra Rovers
- 1922–23 – Beaumaris St Marys
- 1923–24 – Llanfairpwll
- 1924–25 – Beaumaris
- 1925–26 –
- 1926–27 –
- 1927–28 – League not operating
- 1928–29 – Menai Bridge
- 1929–30 – Beaumaris

=== 1930s ===
- 1930–31 – Newborough
- 1931–32 –
- 1932–33 –
- 1933–34 – Llangefni
- 1934–35 – Holyhead Railway Institute
- 1935–36 –
- 1936–37 –
- 1937–38 – Llandegfan
- 1938–39 – Llangefni
- 1939–40 – Football suspended due to the Second World War

=== 1940s ===
- 1940–41 – Football suspended due to the Second World War
- 1941–42 – Football suspended due to the Second World War
- 1942–43 – Football suspended due to the Second World War
- 1943–44 – Football suspended due to the Second World War
- 1944–45 – Football suspended due to the Second World War
- 1945–46 – Football suspended due to the Second World War
- 1946–47 – Amlwch Town (fixtures not completed)
- 1947–48 – Amlwch Town
- 1948–49 – Amlwch Town
- 1949–50 – Amlwch Town

=== 1950s ===
- 1950–51 – Amlwch Town
- 1951–52 – Llangefni
- 1952–53 – Aberffraw
- 1953–54 – Llanfairpwll
- 1954–55 – Newborough
- 1955–56 – Newborough
- 1956–57 – Gwalchmai
- 1957–58 – Newborough
- 1958–59 – Gwalchmai
- 1959–60 – Gwalchmai

=== 1960s ===
- 1960–61 – Newborough
- 1961–62 – Brynsiencyn
- 1962–63 – Brynsiencyn
- 1963–64 – Aberffraw
- 1964–65 – Newborough
- 1965–66 – Newborough
- 1966–67 – Newborough
- 1967–68 – Holyhead Town reserves
- 1968–69 – Newborough
- 1969–70 – Holyhead Town reserves

=== 1970s ===
- 1970–71 – Amlwch Town
- 1971–72 – Amlwch Town
- 1972–73 – Llangoed & District
- 1973–74 – Llandegfan
- 1974–75 – Llanfairpwll
- 1975–76 – Llanfairpwll
- 1976–77 – Llanfairpwll
- 1977–78 – Beaumaris Town
- 1978–79 – Beaumaris Town
- 1979–80 – Holyhead Town

=== 1980s ===
- 1980–81 – Llangefni
- 1981–82 – Llanfairpwll
- 1982–83 – Llanfairpwll
- 1983–84 – Llanerch-y-medd
- 1984–85 – Llanerch-y-medd
- 1985–86 – Holyhead Town
- 1986–87 – Gwalchmai
- 1987–88 – Holyhead Town
- 1988–89 – Llangoed & District
- 1989–90 – Gwalchmai

=== 1990s ===
- 1990–91 – Bodedern
- 1991–92 – Bodedern
- 1992–93 – Llangefni Town reserves
- 1993–94 – Gwalchmai
- 1994–95 – Holyhead Hotspur
- 1995–96 – Holyhead Hotspur
- 1996–97 – Amlwch Town
- 1997–98 – Gwalchmai
- 1998–99 – Bodedern
- 1999–2000 – Cemaes Bay reserves

=== 2000s ===
- 2000–01 – Gwalchmai
- 2001–02 – Beaumaris Town
- 2002–03 – Llangefni-Glantraeth reserves
- 2003–04 – Holyhead Gwelfor Athletic
- 2004–05 – Gaerwen
- 2005–06 – Amlwch Town
- 2006–07 – Holyhead Gwelfor Athletic
- 2007–08 – Gwalchmai
- 2008–09 – Pentraeth Nurseries
- 2009–10 – Bro Goronwy

=== 2010s ===
- 2010–11: – Trearddur Bay United
- 2011–12: – Morawelon
- 2012–13: – Pentraeth
- 2013–14: – Menai Bridge Tigers
- 2014–15: – Valley Athletic
- 2015–16: – Bro Goronwy
- 2016–17: – Holyhead Town
- 2017–18: – Mynydd Tigers
- 2018–19: – Bryngwran Bulls
- 2019–20: – Cemaes Bay

== Dargie Cup winners ==
- 1922–23: – Benllech
- 1923–24: – Llanfairpwll
- 1924–25: – Holyhead Albion
- 1925–26: – Beaumaris
- 1926–27: –
- 1927–28: –
- 1928–29: – Menai Bridge
- 1929–30: – Beaumaris
- 1930–31: – Penmon
- 1931–32: – Holyhead United
- 1932–33: – Penmon
- 1933–34: – Llangefni
- 1934–35: – Holyhead Railway Institute
- 1935–36: – No competition
- 1936–37: – No competition
- 1937–38: – Gaerwen
- 1938–39: – Llangefni
- 1939–40: – Competition suspended - World War Two
- 1940–41: – Competition suspended - World War Two
- 1941–42: – Competition suspended - World War Two
- 1942–43: – Competition suspended - World War Two
- 1943–44: – Competition suspended - World War Two
- 1944–45: – Competition suspended - World War Two
- 1945–46: – Competition suspended - World War Two
- 1946–47: – Llangefni
- 1947–48: – Beaumaris
- 1948–49: – Aberffraw
- 1949–50: – Aberffraw
- 1950–51: – Llangefni
- 1951–52: – Aberffraw
- 1955–56: – Newborough
- 1956–57: – Newborough
- 1958–59: – Newborough
- 1960–61: – Gwalchmai
- 1961–62: – Newborough
- 1962–63: – Aberffraw
- 1963–64: – Aberffraw
- 1964–65: – Newborough
- 1965–66: – Newborough
- 1966–67: – Newborough
- 1967–68: – Amlwch Town
- 1968–69: – Amlwch Town
- 1969–70: – Llangoed & District
- 1970–71: – Llangoed & District
- 1971–72: – Newborough
- 1972–73: – Newborough Amateurs
- 1973–74: – Llanfairpwll
- 1974–75: – Llanfairpwll
- 1975–76: – Llanfairpwll
- 1976–77: – Llanfairpwll
- 1977–78: – Beaumaris Town
- 1978–79: – Menai Bridge Tigers
- 1979–80: – Holyhead United Juniors
- 1980–81: – Bodedern Athletic
- 1981–82: – Llanfairpwll
- 1982–83: – Gwalchmai
- 1983–84: – Llandegfan
- 1984–85: – Llangoed & District
- 1985–86: – Llanerch-y-medd
- 1986–87: – Holyhead Town
- 1987–88: – Holyhead Town
- 1988–89: – Llangoed & District
- 1989–90: – Amlwch Town
- 1990–91: – Bodedern Athletic
- 1991–92: – Trearddur Bay United
- 1992–93: – Llandegfan
- 1993–94: – Holyhead Hotspur
- 1994–95: – Llannerchymedd Bulls
- 1995–96: – Holyhead Hotspur
- 1996–97: – Gwalchmai
- 1997–98: – Final not played due to protest
- 1998–99: – Bodedern Athletic
- 1999–2000: – Cemaes Bay reserves
- 2000–01: – Gwalchmai
- 2001–02: – Beaumaris Town
- 2002–03: – Llangefni-Glantraeth reserves
- 2003–04: – Gaerwen
- 2004–05: – Amlwch Town
- 2005–06: – Holyhead Gwelfor Athletic
- 2006–07: – Bodedern reserves
- 2007–08: – Bro Goronwy
- 2008–09: – Trearddur Bay United
- 2009–10: – Trearddur Bay United
- 2010–11: – Trearddur Bay United
- 2011–12: – Llanerch-y-medd
- 2012–13: – Pentraeth
- 2013–14: – Llangefni Town Reserves
- 2014–15: – Cemaes Bay
- 2015–16: – Llanfairpwll reserves
- 2016–17: – Llangoed & District
- 2017–18: – Bryngwran Bulls
- 2018–19: – Caergybi
- 2019–20: – Final not played due to Covid-19 pandemic
