= Gaerwen F.C. =

Association football club in Wales

Gaerwen
- Full name: Gaerwen Football Club
- Ground: Cae Rhosfain
- Manager: Anthony hughes Gav Thomas
- League: North Wales Coast West Premier Division
- 2025–26: North Wales Coast West Division One, 2nd of 12 (promoted)

Gaerwen Football Club (Welsh: Clwb Pêl Droed Gaerwen) is a Welsh football team based in Gaerwen, Anglesey, Wales. The team play in the North Wales Coast West Premier Division.

== History ==
Gaerwen first appeared in the Anglesey League in the 1929–30 season. In 1937–38 they came third in the league. They reappeared in 1946–47 as Gaerwen Institute, renaming to Gaerwen for the following season.

In 2004–05 they won the Anglesey League title. They then entered the Gwynedd League and finished seventh in their first season.

In 2010–11 the club joined the newly formed Welsh Alliance League Division Two, and played in the league until the end of the 2019–20 season, with a best placed finish of fourth place in that season. The club then joined the newly formed North Wales Coast Football League in the West Premier Division. In the new league's first season (2021–22), Gaerwen finished bottom of the league and were relegated to Division One. They then finished second-bottom in their first season there, but improved to finish sixth and fourth in the next two seasons.

The club is affiliated to the North Wales Coast Football Association and Football Association of Wales.

== Honours ==
- North Wales Coast West Football League Division One – Runners-up: 2025–26
- Anglesey League – Champions: 2004–05
- Bangor & District League – Champions: 1936–37
