= C.P.D. Boded =

Association football club in Wales

Coordinates: 53°17′39.2″N 4°29′53.7″W

CPD Boded
- Full name: Clwb Pel-Droed Bodedern Athletic Football Club
- Nickname: C.P.D Boded FC
- Founded: 1946
- Ground: Cae Ty Cristion, Village Hall, Bodedern
- Manager: Aron Jones
- League: North Wales Coast West Premier Division
- 2025–26: North Wales Coast West Premier Division, 5th of 15
- Website: http://www.pitchero.com/clubs/bodedern
Home colours	Away colours

C.P.D. Boded is a Welsh football team based in the village of Bodedern, Anglesey. They play in the North Wales Coast West Premier Division.

Founded in 1946 as Bodedern Football Club, they played in the Anglesey League until 1999. They then quickly rose up the leagues to reach the Cymru Alliance by 2005, but withdrew during the 2007–08 season due to a shortage of players. The club's reserves continued in the Gwynedd League, where the first team took their place, and renamed to Bodedern Athletic in 2008. They played in the Welsh Alliance League from 2010 to 2014, and again from 2017 to 2020. A dominant season in the North Wales Coast West League gained them promotion to the tier 3 Ardal NW League in 2022, but the club folded in December of that year. They reformed as Boded in 2023, joining the North Wales Coast West League. where they won Division One in their first season.

== History ==
The club was founded in 1946 and originally called Bodedern Football Club. They played in the Anglesey League from their founding until joining the Gwynedd League for the first time in 1999. They joined the Welsh Alliance League in 2002 and then the Cymru Alliance in 2005. They played there up to the 2006–07 season, but resigned from the league on 16 October 2007 due to a shortage of players. The club changed its name to Bodedern Athletic and took its reserves' place in the Gwynedd League. In 2008–09 they won the Eryri Shield. In 2009–10 the club won promotion from the Gwynedd League as runners up. The following season the club won back to back promotions finishing as runners up in the Welsh Alliance League Division Two. They left the league during the 2014–15 season and then played in the Gwynedd League until returning in 2017. They finished second in Division Two in their first season, gaining promotion to Division One, where they finished 2nd and 7th before the league folded in 2020.

In 2020 they became members of the new North Wales Coast West Football League, in its Premier Division. Their 2021–22 season was highly successful. In February 2022 they were named as the best performing non-league team in the UK, after their 18th consecutive win. They finished as champions, with a record of 26 wins, 1 draw, and 1 loss in 28 matches, and were runners-up to Bangor 1876 in the Premier Division Cup. In the 2021–22 they also won 17–0 against Gaerwen in the Welsh Cup, a record for a North Wales team in the competition.

On 9 June 2022, it was announced that the club had been promoted to the tier 3 Ardal NW League. However the club folded on 7 December 2022 and resigned from the league, likely due to heavy fines for non-fulfilment of fixtures.

A reformed club joined the North Wales Coast West Football League as a Division One side for the 2023–24 season, named CPD Boded. They gained promotion to the Premier Division after finishing 3rd in their first season.

== Ground ==
Bodedern Athletic were based at Cae Ty Cristion, at Bodedern Village Hall on Church Street.

The pitch is surrounded by railings and includes home and away dugouts for 8–9 people, as well as covered seating for 54 spectators. It has two changing rooms (home and away), each with 6 shower heads and a toilet. The changing rooms located about 10 metres away from the pitch. Outside of the ground is car parking for up to 40–50 cars. Refreshments during matches are available, and after-match refreshments are available at the George Inn, about a 2 minute walk away from the ground.

The club was chosen to host matches during the 2019 Inter Games Football Tournament.

Improvements were made at the ground during the summer of 2022, to be accepted for to the Ardal NW League.

== Club colours ==
The club colours are currently green and white, though in the 2000s Bodedern used an all-red kit.

In the 2013–14 season, Bodedern Athletic used green and white stripes, with green shorts and socks. Similar designs were used by the club until they folded in 2022. Boded also used a similar design in their first season after reforming. Since then they have used a predominantly green kit, with some white designs.

== Club honours ==
as Bodedern

- 1948–49 Anglesey League Division 2 Runners-Up
- 1977–78 Anglesey League Division 1 Winners
- 1979–80 Megan Cup Winners
- 1980–81 Anglesey League Division 1 Runners-Up, Megan Cup Winners, Dargie Cup Winners
- 1981–82 Anglesey League Division 2 Winners
- 1985–86 JW Lees Cup Runners-Up
- 1988–89 JW Lees Cup Runners-Up
- 1989–90 Anglesey League Division 1 Runners-Up, Megan Cup Winners
- 1990–91 Anglesey League Division 1 Winners, Elias Cup Winners
- 1998–99 Anglesey League Division 1 Winners, JW Lees Cup Winners, Megan Cup Winners, Dargie Cup Winners
- 1999–00 Barritt Cup Runners-Up
- 2000–01 Gwynedd Cup Winners, President's Cup Winners, Eryri Shield Winners
- 2001–02 Gwynedd League Winners, Gwynedd Cup Winners, President's Cup Winners, Eryri Shield Winners, Barritt Cup Runners-Up
- 2003–04 Barritt Cup Winners
- 2004–05 Welsh Alliance League Winners, Welsh Alliance Charity Cup Winners
- 2007–08 Gwynedd Cup Runners-Up

as Bodedern Athletic

- 2008–09 Eryri Shield Winners, Gwynedd Cup Runners-Up
- 2010–11 Take Stock Welsh Alliance Division Two Cup Winners
- 2021–22 North Wales Coast West Football League Premier Division Winners
- 2021–22 North Wales Coast West Football League Premier Division Cup Runners-up

as Boded

- 2023–24 North Wales Coast West Football League Division One Winners
