= C.P.D. Gwalchmai =

Association football club in Wales

Gwalchmai
- Full name: C.P.D. Gwalchmai
- Founded: 1946
- Ground: Maes Meurig; Gwalchmai
- Chairman: Glyn Jones
- Manager: Craig Evans
- League: North Wales Coast West Premier Division
- 2024–25: North Wales Coast West Premier Division, 2nd of 16
Home colours	Away colours

C.P.D. Gwalchmai is a football club from Gwalchmai in Wales. They play in the North Wales Coast West Premier Division and with their home games at Maes Meurig. The club is one of Anglesey's most successful football teams, winning nine top division Anglesey League title, one Gwynedd League title and major success in different cup competitions reaching 49 finals, winning 26, including North Wales Coast Football Association Junior Cup on three occasions.

== History ==
The club was formed in 1946 and has spent most of its existence playing in the now defunct Anglesey League, where they were the joint most successful team in the league with nine titles. Previous managers including Bryngwran local William Williams and Paul Owen from Gwalchmai who are two of the clubs most successful managers. Their last Anglesey League title was in 2007–08 when they were promoted to the Gwynedd League. At the end of their second season in that league, they gained promotion to the Welsh Alliance League, and finishing the season as Gwynedd League treble winners, landing the league title, Gwynedd Cup and President's Cup, as well as reaching the NWCFA Intermediate Cup and Barritt Cup finals.

The club spent six seasons in the top division of the league, finishing mid-table in each season (7th, 9th, 8th, 8th, 7th and 9th respectively). In the summer of 2016 the club folded, citing lack of players and withdrew from the league. The club returned for the 2017–18 season, playing in the Gwynedd League and finishing fifth, before finishing league runners-up the following season and gaining promotion to Division Two of the Welsh Alliance League. In the 2019–20 season, the club finished sixth (on points per game) in a season curtailed by the COVID-19 pandemic.

They then joined the newly formed North Wales Coast West Football League Premier Division for the 2020–21 season, a season which was cancelled due to the COVID-19 pandemic, with the club starting the 2021–22 season when amateur football returned to Wales in the summer of 2021.

The club hosted several matches during the 2019 Inter Games Football Tournament.

== Honours ==
=== Leagues ===
- Gwynedd League – Champions (1): 2009–10
- Gwynedd League – Runners-up: 2018–19
- Welsh National League Division IIIB (Anglesey League) – Champions: 1951-52
- Anglesey League – Champions (9): 1956–57, 1958–59, 1959–60, 1986–87, 1989–90, 1993–94, 1997–98, 2000–01, 2007–08
- Anglesey League – Runners-up (13): 1946–47, 1954–55, 1955–56, 1957–58, 1961–62, 1980–81, 1983–84, 1985–86, 1988–89, 1990–91, 1991–92, 1992–93, 1996–97
- Anglesey League Division Three – Champions: 1978–79

=== Cups ===
- North Wales Coast FA Junior Challenge Cup – Winners: 1958–59, 1960–61, 1990–91, 1992–93, 1995-96
- North Wales Coast FA Intermediate Cup – Winners: 2023–24
- North Wales Coast FA Intermediate Cup – Finalists: 2009–10, 2012–13
- North Wales Coast West Premier Cup – Winners: 2022–23
- Cwpan Gwynedd – Winners (1): 2009–10
- Barritt Cup – Finalists: 2009–10
- Dargie Cup – Winners (4): 1960–61, 1982–83, 1996–97, 2000-01
- Elias Cup – Winners (6): 1956–57, 1957–58, 1958–59, 1988–89, 1996–97, 1997-98
- Elias Cup – Finalists: 2007–08
- Gwynedd League Shield – Winners: 2017–18
- Gwynedd Premier Cup – Winners (1): 2009–10
- J.W Lee Shield – Winners (2): 1992–93, 1995-96
- Megan Cup – Winners (7): 1959–60, 1961–62, 1980–81, 1989–90, 1991–92, 1993–94, 2000-01
- S.K.Williams Shield – Winners (2): 1977–78, 1978-79
