= Holyhead Town F.C. =

Association football club in Wales

Holyhead Town
- Full name: Holyhead Town Football Club
- Nickname(s): Harbourmen
- Founded: 1925
- Ground: Millbank Sports Field
- League: North Wales Coast West Division One
- 2023–24: North Wales Coast West Division One, 12th of 12

Holyhead Town Football Club is a Welsh football team based in Holyhead, Anglesey, Wales. The team play in the North Wales Coast West Division One.

== History ==
The team was formed in 1925 and competed in the Welsh National League, North Wales Football Combination and North Wales Coast League before beginning a long stay in the Welsh League North in 1935–36. They were four times league champions in 1949–50, 1957–58, 1963–64 and 1969–70. They dropped into the Anglesey League from the 1975–76 season.

The club went out of existence between 1998 and 2009, and again from 2012–13 to 2015–16. They reformed in 2016, winning the Anglesey League in their first season back, the Gwynedd League title the following season and promotion to the Welsh Alliance League. For the 2018–19 season re-introduced a reserve side in the Anglesey League.

The club resigned from the Welsh Alliance League in December 2019 but did not fold with its reserve side, in the Anglesey League becoming its first team.

They then joined the newly formed North Wales Coast West Football League Division One for the 2020–21 season, a season which was cancelled due to the COVID-19 pandemic, with the club starting the 2021–22 season when amateur football returned to Wales in the summer of 2021.

In the Welsh Cup the club has twice reached the quarter-final stages in 1960–61 and 1961–62.

== Honours ==
=== League ===
- Welsh League North
  - Champions (4): 1949–50, 1957–58, 1963–64, 1969–70
- Gwynedd League
  - Champions (2): 1992–93, 2017–18
- Anglesey League
  - Champions (6): 1967–68 (reserves), 1969–70 (reserves), 1979–80, 1985–86, 1987–88, 2016–17
  - Runners-up: 1988–89 (reserves)

=== Cups ===
- NWCFA Challenge Cup – Winners (2): 1955–56; 1966–67
- North Wales Coast FA Junior Challenge Cup – Winners (1): 1987-88
- Cwpan Gwynedd – Winners: 2017–18
- Lucas Oil Cup - Winners: 2016–17
- Megan Cup – Winners: 2016–17
