= NWCFA Junior Cup =

Association football tournament in Wales

- Founded: 1895
- Region: Wales
- Current champions: Mountain Rangers
- Most championships: Menai Bridge (8 titles)
- 2025–26

The North Wales Coast FA Junior Challenge Cup is a football knockout tournament involving teams from in North Wales who play in leagues administered and associated with the North Wales Coast Football Association.

== Previous winners ==
Information sourced from the North Wales Coast Football Association website.

=== 1890s ===
- 1895–96: – Bangor
- 1896–97: – Buckley Victoria
- 1897–98: – Bangor
- 1898–99: – Colwyn Bay
- 1899–1900: – Flint reserves

=== 1900s ===
- 1900–01: – Rhyl reserves
- 1901–02: – Llanrwst
- 1902–03: – Flint UAC
- 1903–04: – Conway
- 1904–05: – Bangor reserves
- 1905–06: – Greenfield and Holyhead
- 1906–07: – Rhyl Vics
- 1907–08: – Llanrwst
- 1908–09: – Llanrwst
- 1909–10: – Bagillt

=== 1910s ===
- 1910–11: – Holyhead reserves
- 1911–12: – Menai Bridge
- 1912–13: – Glasinfryn
- 1913–14: – Menai Bridge
- 1914–15: – No competition - World War One
- 1915–16: – No competition - World War One
- 1916–17: – No competition - World War One
- 1917–18: – No competition - World War One
- 1918–19: – No competition - World War One–
- 1919–20: – Bangor Athletic Reserves

=== 1920s ===
- 1920–21: – Abergele
- 1921–22: – Glasinfryn
- 1922–23: – O’holt St David’s (Flint)
- 1923–24: – Abergele
- 1924–25: – Beaumaris
- 1925–26: – Llanrwst
- 1926–27: – Menai Bridge
- 1927–28: – Bethesda
- 1928–29: – Prestatyn
- 1929–30: – Menai Bridge

=== 1930s ===
- 1930–31: – Mold Alexandra
- 1931–32: – Menai Bridge
- 1932–33: – Menai Bridge
- 1933–34: – Colwyn Bay Comrades
- 1934–35: – Llanberis
- 1935–36: – Llanberis
- 1936–37: – Shotton Athletic
- 1937–38: – Shotton Athletic
- 1938–39: – Bangor Normal College
- 1939–40: – Connah’s Quay Albion

=== 1940s ===
- 1940–41: – No competition - World War Two
- 1941–42: – No competition - World War Two
- 1942–43: – No competition - World War Two
- 1943–44: – No competition - World War Two
- 1944–45: – No competition - World War Two
- 1945–46: – Mostyn YMCA
- 1946–47: – Menai Bridge
- 1947–48: – Menai Bridge
- 1948–49: – 31 TRA, Kinmel Camp
- 1949–50: – Amlwch Town

=== 1950s ===
- 1950–51: – Connah’s Quay Albion
- 1951–52: – Connah’s Quay Albion
- 1952–53: – Greenfield United
- 1953–54: – Mostyn YMCA
- 1954–55: – Saltney Ferry
- 1955–56: – Amlwch Town
- 1956–57: – Newborough
- 1957–58: – Newborough
- 1958–59: – Gwalchmai
- 1959–60: – Mostyn YMCA

=== 1960s ===
- 1960–61: – Gwalchmai
- 1961–62: – Gwydyr Rovers
- 1962–63: – Brynsiencyn
- 1963–64: – Llanberis
- 1964–65: – Llanberis
- 1965–66: – Llanberis
- 1966–67: – Llechid Celts
- 1967–68: – Machno United
- 1968–69: – Llechid Celts
- 1969–70: – Rhyl Wanderers

=== 1970s ===
- 1970–71: – Llangoed & District
- 1971–72: – Mostyn YMCA
- 1972–73: – Mostyn YMCA
- 1973–74: – Mostyn YMCA
- 1974–75: – Llandegfan
- 1975–76: – Llanfairpwll
- 1976–77: – Holywell Town
- 1977–78: – Llanrug United
- 1978–79: – Llanrug United
- 1979–80: – Bethesda Athletic

=== 1980s ===
- 1980–81: – Llanfairpwll
- 1981–82: – Hawarden Rangers
- 1982–83: – Llanfairpwll
- 1983–84: – Rhydymwyn
- 1984–85: – Llanerch-y-medd
- 1985–86: – Sychdyn
- 1986–87: – Bro Goronwy
- 1987–88: – Holyhead Town
- 1988–89: – Llanfairfechan Town
- 1989–90: – Connah’s Quay Albion

=== 1990s ===
- 1990–91: – Gwalchmai
- 1991–92: – Llangefni Town reserves
- 1992–93: – Gwalchmai
- 1993–94: – Deiniolen
- 1994–95: – Machno United
- 1995–96: – Gwalchmai
- 1996–97: – Amlwch Town
- 1997–98: – Glan Conwy
- 1998–99: – Abergele
- 1999–2000: – Nefyn United

=== 2000s ===
- 2000–01: – Nantlle Vale
- 2001–02: – Bethel
- 2002–03: – Castle Rhuddlan
- 2003–04: – Llangoed & District
- 2004–05: – Llanystumdwy
- 2005–06: – Caernarfon Borough
- 2006–07: – Beaumaris Town
- 2007–08: – Barmouth & Dyffryn United
- 2008–09: – Trearddur Bay United
- 2009–10: – Mynydd Llandegai

=== 2010s ===
- 2010–11: – Point of Ayr
- 2011–12: – Morawelon
- 2012–13: – Y Felinheli
- 2013–14: – Y Felinheli
- 2014–15: – Llandudno Albion
- 2015–16: – Llanfairpwll reserves
- 2016–17: – Bro Goronwy
- 2017–18: – Nefyn United
- 2018–19: – Bro Goronwy
- 2019–20: – No competition - Covid-19 pandemic

=== 2020s ===
- 2020–21: – No competition - Covid-19 pandemic
- 2021–22: – Cemaes Bay
- 2022–23: – Abergele
- 2023–24: – Final not played
- 2024–25: – Blaenau Ffestiniog
- 2025–26: – Mountain Rangers
