= Bethesda Athletic F.C. =

Association football club in Wales

Coordinates: 53°10′37″N 4°3′30″W

Bethesda Athletic
- Full name: Bethesda Athletic Football Club
- Nickname: Pesda
- Short name: CPD BA
- Founded: 1946
- Ground: Parc Meurig; Bethesda
- Capacity: 1,000
- Chairman: Martin Rosser
- Manager: Adrian Roberts
- League: Ardal NW League
- 2025–26: Ardal NW League, 5th of 16
Home colours

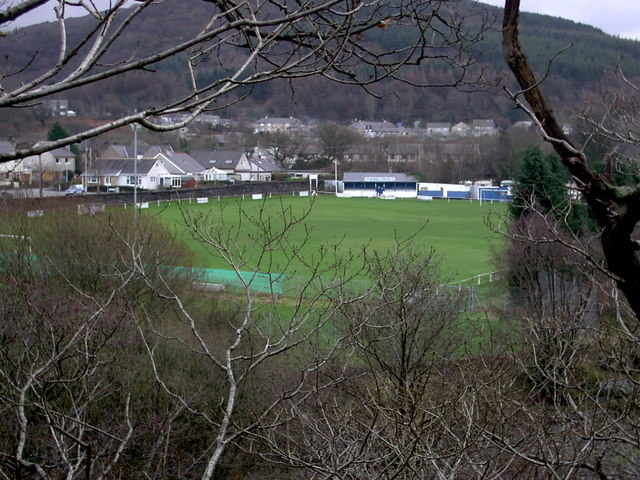
Parc Meurig, home of Bethesda Athletic.

Bethesda Athletic F.C. (/bɛˈθɛzdə/; Welsh: [bɛθ'ɛsda]) is a football club based in the Welsh town of Bethesda, in northwest Wales. They play in the Ardal NW League.

== History ==
=== Predecessor clubs ===
In the 1913-14 season, Bethesda United competed in the North Wales Coast League. In 1919, a team known as Bethesda Comrades were playing in the North Wales Coast League, and they would only compete in the 1919-20 season. The next season, Ogwen Valley FC would compete in the North Wales Coast League. In the 1930s Bethesda Victoria were involved in North Wales football circles, winning the North Wales Combination and NWCFA Challenge Cup in 1931–32.

=== Early years and Welsh League (North) ===
Bethesda Athletic was formed in 1946. In the 1948–49 season they joined the Welsh National League (North) Division 1, and early years in the league saw them regularly finish bottom, or near bottom of the table. The late 1960s saw the club regularly finish near the top of the division, with the first league title coming in the 1970–71 season, and a period of relative success followed in this period.

Athletic also enjoyed some good runs in the Welsh Cup, the English F.A. Cup, and the English F.A. Trophy. A long Welsh Cup run in 1960 saw wins over Nantlle Vale, Penmaenmawr and Pwllheli which set up a Quarter Final date with Cardiff City which ended in a six nil defeat against the eventual winners. In 1976 they beat Oswestry Town but were knocked out by Bangor City at Farrar Road. The score was 4–2 goals from Broadhead, Olney and John Hughes for Bangor and Alan Leicester for Bethesda.

In the FA Cup Bethesda took Tamworth to two replays in 1970 before finally bowing out. In 1974 Bethesda knocked out South Liverpool in the Qualifying rounds of The FA Cup but were eventually beaten by Rhyl in a second replay after two drawn matches.

The club spent 28 seasons in the Welsh League (North) with their final season, 1976–77, bringing the club's second divisional Championship.

=== Caernarfon & District League and Gwynedd League ===
The 1977–78 season saw the club move to the Caernarfon & District League, where they remained for six seasons, before moving to the Gwynedd League for a singular season, where they finished in third position.

=== Welsh Alliance ===
1984–85 saw the club join the Welsh Alliance League, the successor to the Welsh League (North) as a founder member. For the first two seasons, the club were runners-up in the league, before in 1988–87 finishing as champions. In 1990 when fellow Welsh Alliance members Fflint, Conwy, Porthmadog and Connah's Quay joined the newly formed Cymru Alliance, Bethesda remained in the Welsh Alliance League.

=== Return to Caernarfon & District/ Gwynedd Leagues ===
After finishing third in the Welsh Alliance in 1990–91, the club decided to drop down to the local Caernarfon & District League where they remained until stepping up to the Gwynedd League after being crowned champions in 1997–98 season. After two seasons in this league they were promoted to the Welsh Alliance League in 2000 after being crowned champions for the 1999–2000 season.

=== Welsh Alliance success ===
The club spent nine years in the Welsh Alliance culminating in two successive championship winning years. In the 2007–08 season they were champions of the Welsh Alliance League but were refused promotion to the Cymru Alliance by the Football Association of Wales. Two players, Gareth Davies and Richie Owen, scored 70 goals between them over the course of the season.

The following season saw the club break the league's season goal-scoring record, with 146 goals - again securing the league title.

After also completing upgrades to their football ground, the club stepped up to the second tier of Welsh football – the Cymru Alliance.

=== Cymru Alliance ===
The club spent a solitary season in the Cymru Alliance, finishing ninth from 17 clubs in 2009–10 season.

=== Return to the Welsh Alliance ===
The club returned to the Alliance, competing for two subsequent seasons. In August 2012 they were not able to complete fixtures and were given 14 days by the league's Management Committee to resolve their issues. The club announced in September that it was disbanding and resigned from the league "due to various circumstances".

After a season away - the club returned for the 2013–14 season but finished bottom of the Welsh Alliance Division Two with six points. The following season saw them finish 10th from 16 clubs, before they again left the league.

=== Return to the Gwynedd League ===
The club returned to the Gwynedd League, finishing bottom of the league in the 2016–17 season. The following season they withdrew from the league.

In 2018 it was announced that the club would return to the league again but they again resigned from the league in August 2018 without playing any games.

They were named as a returning club for the 2019–20 season to same league.

== Ladies ==
The club also has a ladies team, Bethesda Athletic Ladies, who were established in 2018. The play in the North Wales Women's Football League part of Wales' women's football pyramid. Their first season saw them compete in the second division, finishing the season as champions. In their second season, they played in the first division before withdrawing from the league in September 2019 and having their results expunged. The club announced they will continue to play instead at recreational level in the North Wales Recreational League.

== Honours ==
- North Wales Coast West Football League Division One Cup – Winners: 2021–22
- Caernarfon & District League – Champions (1): 1997–98
- Caernarfon & District League – Runners-Up (1): 1996–97
- Gwynedd League – Champions (1): 1999–2000
- Welsh Alliance – Champions (3): 1986–87; 2007–08, 2008–09
- Welsh Alliance – Runners-Up (3): 1984–85, 1985–86, 1987–88
- Welsh League (North) (2) – Champions: 1970–71, 1976–77
- Welsh League (North) (2) – Runners-Up: 1971–72, 1973–74
- North Wales Coast FA Junior Challenge Cup – Winners: 1979–80

== League history ==
Season	League	Final position
1946-47		
1947-48		
1948-49		
1949-50	Welsh League (North) Division 1	11th
1950-51	Welsh League (North) Division 1	10th
1951-52	Welsh League (North) Division 1	17th
1952-53	Welsh League (North) Division 1	18th
1953-54	Welsh League (North) Division 1	18th
1954-55	Welsh League (North) Division 1	13th
1955-56	Welsh League (North) Division 1	16th
1956-57	Welsh League (North) Division 1	14th
1957-58	Welsh League (North) Division 1	15th
1958-59	Welsh League (North) Division 1	17th
1959-60	Welsh League (North) Division 1	4th
1960-61	Welsh League (North) Division 1	14th
1961-62	Welsh League (North)	10th
1962-63	Welsh League (North)	11th
1963-64	Welsh League (North)	10th
1964-65	Welsh League (North)	17th
1965-66	Welsh League (North)	13th
1966-67	Welsh League (North)	16th
1967-68	Welsh League (North)	3rd
1968-69	Welsh League (North)	4th
1969-70	Welsh League (North)	4th
1970-71	Welsh League (North)	1st
1971-72	Welsh League (North)	2nd
1972-73	Welsh League (North)	7th
1973-74	Welsh League (North)	2nd
1974-75	Welsh League (North)	6th
1975-76	Welsh League (North)	3rd
1976-77	Welsh League (North)	1st
1977-78	Caernarfon & District League	7th
1978-79	Caernarfon & District League	9th
1979-80	Caernarfon & District League	3rd
1980-81	Caernarfon & District League	10th
1981-82	Caernarfon & District League	10th
1982-83	Caernarfon & District League	12th
1983-84	Gwynedd League	3rd
1984-85	Welsh Alliance League	2nd
1985-96	Welsh Alliance League	2nd
1986-87	Welsh Alliance League	1st
1987-88	Welsh Alliance League	2nd
1988-89	Welsh Alliance League	8th
1989-90	Welsh Alliance League	5th
1990–91	Welsh Alliance League	3rd
1991–92	Caernarfon & District League	15th
1992–93	Caernarfon & District League	4th
1993–94	Caernarfon & District League	4th
1994–95	Caernarfon & District League	4th
1995–96	Caernarfon & District League	3rd
1996–97	Caernarfon & District League	2nd
1997–98	Caernarfon & District League	1st
1998–99	Gwynedd League	4th
1999–2000	Gwynedd League	1st
2000–01	Welsh Alliance League	4th
2001–02	Welsh Alliance League	7th
2002–03	Welsh Alliance League	4th
2003–04	Welsh Alliance League	6th
2004–05	Welsh Alliance League	3rd
2005–06	Welsh Alliance League	3rd
2006–07	Welsh Alliance League	6th
2007–08	Welsh Alliance League	1st
2008–09	Welsh Alliance League	1st
2009–10	Cymru Alliance	9th
2010–11	Welsh Alliance League 1	9th
2011–12	Welsh Alliance League 1	5th
2012–13	Welsh Alliance League 1	Resigned from League
2013–14	Welsh Alliance League 2	13th
2014–15	Welsh Alliance League 2	10th
2015–16	Welsh Alliance League 2	13th
2016–17	Gwynedd League	12th
2017–18	Gwynedd League	Withdrew from the league
2018–19	Gwynedd League	Withdrew from the league prior to season start
2019–20	Gwynedd League	14th
2020–21	North Wales Coast West Football League Division One	Competition not played - Covid-19 pandemic
2021-22	North Wales Coast West Football League Division One	2nd
2022-23	North Wales Coast West Football League Premier Division	1st
2023-24	Ardal North West League	14th
2024-25	North Wales Coast West Football League Premier Division	1st
2025-26	Ardal North West League	5th
