= Gwynedd League =

Former association football league in Wales

Gwynedd Football League
- Founded: 1983
- Folded: 2020
- Country: Wales
- Divisions: 1
- Number of clubs: 15
- Level on pyramid: 5
- Promotion to: Welsh Alliance League Division 2
- Relegation to: Anglesey League; Caernarfon & District League
- Last champions: Bangor 1876 (2019–20)
- Most championships: Y Felinheli (3 titles)

The Gwynedd Football League was a football league at the fifth level of the Welsh football league system in north-west Wales.

The league folded in 2020 due to a reorganisation of the Welsh football league pyramid, with many teams joining the North Wales Coast West Football League.

== Member clubs for the final 2019–20 season ==
- Bangor 1876
- Bethesda Athletic
- Bontnewydd
- Bro Goronwy
- Caergybi
- Glantraeth
- Llangoed
- Llannerch-y-medd
- Llanystumdwy
- Menai Bridge Tigers
- Ogwen Tigers (folded June 2020)
- Nefyn United
- Talysarn Celts
- Trearddur Bay Bulls
- Waunfawr

== Cups ==
There were three active cups played for within the league. They were:

- Tarian Gwynedd Safeflue Shield
- Cwpan Gwynedd (Gwynedd Cup)
- Tarian Goffa Bob Owen Memorial Shield

== History ==
=== Champions ===
- 1983–84: Y Felinheli
- 1984–85: Bethesda Athletic
- 1985–86: No competition
- 1986–87: Locomotive Llanberis
- 1987–88: Nantlle Vale
- 1988–89: Llangefni Town
- 1989–90: Llangefni Town
- 1990–91: Llanrug United
- 1991–92: Nefyn United
- 1992–93: Holyhead Town
- 1993–94: Glantraeth
- 1994–95: Porthmadog Reserves
- 1995–96: Conwy United Reserves
- 1996–97: Holyhead Hotspur Reserves
- 1997–98: Amlwch Town
- 1998–99: Glan Conwy
- 1999–2000: Bethesda Athletic
- 2000–01: Y Felinheli
- 2001–02: Bodedern Reserves
- 2002–03: Llanrug United
- 2003–04: Llanrwst United
- 2004–05: Porthmadog Reserves
- 2005–06: Pwllheli
- 2006–07: Barmouth & Dyffryn United
- 2007–08: Llanllyfni
- 2008–09: Blaenau Ffestiniog Amateurs
- 2009–10: Gwalchmai
- 2010–11: Bro Goronwy
- 2011–12: Penrhyndeudraeth
- 2012–13: Trearddur Bay United
- 2013–14: Llanerch-y-medd
- 2014–15: Llanllyfni
- 2015–16: Y Felinheli
- 2016–17: Bodedern Athletic
- 2017–18: Holyhead Town
- 2018–19: Menai Bridge Tigers
- 2019–20: Bangor 1876

=== Player of the Season ===
- 1983–84: Derlwyn Hughes (Menai Bridge Tigers)
- 1984–85: Osian Roberts (Bethesda Athletic)
- 1985–86: No competition
- 1986–87: Carl Davies (Machno United)
- 1987–88: Iwan Evans (Locomotive Llanberis)
- 1988–89: Emrys Jones (Llangefni Town)
- 1989–90: Howard Kemp (Univ. of Bangor)
- 1990–91: David Phillips (Llanrug United)
- 1991–92: Dale Flemming (Holyhead Town)
- 1992–93: Nigel Moore (Holyhead Town)
- 1993–94: Kevin S. Hughes (Blaenau Ffestiniog Amateurs)
- 1994–95: Paul Evans (Hotpoint)
- 1995–96: Simon Mills (Conwy United)
- 1996–97: Nigel Moore (Holyhead Hotspur)
- 1997–98: Ryan Davies (Llandegfan)
- 1998–99: Lee Newport (Barmouth & Dyffryn United)
- 1999–2000: Cemlyn Williams (Bethesda Athletic)
- 2000–01:
- 2001–02: Leighton Griffiths (Llanrwst United)
- 2002–03: Lex Piper (Univ. of Bangor)
- 2003–04: Michael Linnekar (Univ. of Bangor)
- 2004–05: Lloyd Edwards (Porthmadog)
- 2005–06: Lloyd Edwards (Pwllheli)
- 2006–07: Craig Papirnyk (Barmouth & Dyffryn)
- 2007–08: Chris Parry (Llanllyfni)
- 2008–09: Gareth Wyn Roberts (Bodedern Athletic)
- 2009–10: Jonathan Sadler (Caernarfon Wanderers)
- 2010–11:
- 2011–12: Mathew Hughes (Penrhyndeudraeth)
- 2012–13: Ian Williams (Trearddur Bay United)
- 2013–14:
- 2014–15:
- 2015–16:
- 2016–17:
- 2017–18:

=== Top goalscorer ===
- 1983–84: Billy Hughes (Y Felinheli, 22 goals)
- 1984–85: Peter Kasperek (Llanfairpwll, 12 goals)
- 1985–86: No competition
- 1986–87: Steven Williams (Llanberis, 26 goals)
- 1987–88: Hugh Jones (Nantlle Vale, 36 goals)
- 1988–89: David Jones (Nefyn United, 37 goals)
- 1989–90: David Jones (Nefyn United, 41 goals)
- 1990–91: Richard Richards (Machno United, 35 goals)
- 1991–92: David Jones (Nefyn United, 38 goals)
- 1992–93: Dale Flemming (Holyhead Town, 35 goals)
- 1993–94: John Hayes (Mountain Rangers, 51 goals)
- 1994–95: Ian Williams (Porthmadog, 37 goals)
- 1995–96: Dominic Hardy (Barmouth & Dyffryn, 39 goals)
- 1996–97: Matthew Evans (Llanrwst United, 28 goals)
- 1997–98: Viv Williams (Amlwch Town, 43 goals)
- 1998–99: David Jones (Pwllheli, 34 goals)
- 1999–2000: Daron Wyn Jones (Llangefni, 32 goals)
- 2000–01: Terry Jones (Felinheli, 24 goals)
- 2001–02: Alan Jones (Nefyn United, 37 goals)
- 2002–03: Anthony Hughes (Beaumaris Town, 39 goals)
- 2003–04: Andy Hall (Univ. of Bangor, N/A)
- 2004–05: Gareth Davies (Beaumaris Town, 34 goals)
- 2005–06: Peter Griffiths (Pwllheli, 31 goals)
- 2006–07: Carl Ryan (Barmouth & Dyffryn, 35 goals)
- 2007–08: Mathew Hughes (Porthmadog, 40 goals)
- 2008–09: Jamie Whitemore (Bethel, 37 goals)
- 2009–10: Andy Clarke (Beaumaris Town, 27 goals)
- 2010–11: Ian Pleming (Glantraeth, 26 goals)
- 2011–12:
- 2012–13: Darren Ishmael (Beaumaris Town, N/A)
- 2013–14:
- 2014–15: Sion Parry (Llanystumdwy, 56 goals)
- 2015–16: Sion Parry (Llanystumdwy, 42 goals)
- 2016–17: Sion Parry (Llanystumdwy, 36 goals)
- 2017–18: Sion Parry (Llanystumdwy, 40 goals)
