= Holywell Town F.C. =

Association football club in Wales

Coordinates: 53.2696°N 3.2142°W

Holywell Town
- Full name: Holywell Town Football Club
- Nickname: The Wellmen
- Founded: 1880; 146 years ago (as Holywell Football Club)
- Ground: Bartons North Wales Stadium; Holywell
- Capacity: 2,000
- Chair: Tracey Jones
- Manager: Johnny Haseldin
- League: Cymru Premier
- 2025–26: Cymru North, 3rd of 16 (promoted)
- Website: http://www.holywelltownfc.co.uk/
Home colours	Away colours

Holywell Town Football Club (Welsh: Clwb Pêl-droed Treffynnon) is a Welsh semi-professional association football club based in Holywell, Flintshire. They play in the Cymru Premier, the highest tier in the Welsh football league system, having achieved promotion from the Cymru North in the 2025-26 season. The club plays its home matches at Halkyn Road, which is known as the Bartons North Wales Stadium for sponsorship purposes, and its nickname is "The Wellmen". The club's traditional home shirt design is red and white vertical stripes.

Holywell Town were a founding member of the Cymru Alliance and the League of Wales (now the Cymru Premier), and recorded their highest top-flight finish of fifth position in the 1993-94 League of Wales. Their promotion for the 2026-27 season marks their return to the Welsh top flight following relegation in 1999. Since 2010, the club has won the FAW Trophy twice, in 2011 and 2015, the Welsh Alliance League Division One title in 2015, the Welsh National League Premier Division in 2019-20, and the Cymru North in 2023-24. In 2013-14, they reached the semi-finals of the Welsh Cup, becoming the first third-tier club to reach that stage.

== Early history ==

Holywell's first starting line-up in the 23 October 1880 match against Denbigh.

=== Holywell F.C. ===
==== Foundations of the Club ====
The history of football in Holywell can be traced back to a club that was simply known as Holywell Football Club, which was founded on 25 September 1880 at the King's Head Hotel in the town. The club's first game came a few weeks later on 23 October when the "Holywellites" played a goalless draw at home against Denbigh, before playing their first away game versus Rhyl the following Saturday. There is no evidence of who scored the first Holywell goal in a 2–2 draw against their opponents (the very first in the club's history), but the second goal was scored by right-winger E. Bratt to level the scores. The first local derby between Holywell and their fierce, long-time rivals Flint occurred on 27 November 1880, with the Holywellites edging the "very interesting game" by a single goal from J.C. Douglas.

During the early history of the club, Holywell played their football on a ground known as Ffordd Fer ('Short Way'), which was a short distance from the town centre and located near to where the local high school is now situated. The ground no longer exists on Strand Park road with houses having been built onto top of the former football ground. Holywell FC also wore red and white colours as their home strip, the same colours that the current team wears today in its current home kit.

==== First Welsh Cup Appearances ====
Holywell F.C. made their Welsh Cup debut in 1881, almost a year to the date of their first-ever game, when they played in the first round of the 1881–82 Welsh Cup (the fifth edition of Wales' national cup competition). On 22 October 1881, they took on the 'A' team of Northwich Victoria but lost to the Cheshire side 0–3 at Ffordd Fer.

Holywell Dee Rovers (also known as Dee Rovers or Holywell Rovers) became the second Holywell-based side to appear in the national cup competition when they competed in two consecutive competitions between 1882 and 1883. In the former tournament, they lost 1–6 away to Dolgelley Idris in the first round, before suffering another first-round defeat in their latter appearance, getting comprehensively demolished 0–16 by Davenham.

It would be another five years before another Holywell-based side competed in the Welsh Cup, with Holywell F.C. returning to make their second appearance. They too failed to progress beyond the first round of the 1888-89 Welsh Cup by losing 2–4 at home to Mold. The result was repeated in the 1890-91 version of the cup competition, this time losing 2–3 away to their local rivals.

Holywell F.C. reached the third round of the 1892-93 Welsh Cup without playing a game. In the first round, they were scheduled to play Porthmadoc, but the Caernarfonshire-based club withdrew from the competition before the match. They then earned a bye in the second round and were subsequently drawn to play against Llandudno Swifts in the third round. Alas, Holywell failed to appear for their scheduled cup match in early January 1893 and were thrown out of the competition by the FAW, thus awarding the fixture to their opponents.

==== North Wales Coast League ====
In March 1893, Holywell F.C. became one of the seven founder members of the North Wales Coast League, and had 58 players registered with the club within six months of the league commencing. Holywell finished in fourth position in the inaugural season of the North Wales Coast League. This was followed by three seasons of fifth-place league finishes in the division before ending in the 1897–98 season, when the club finished in sixth place. This would be the worst position the club would end up during their time in the Coast League.

The club reached their first cup final in 1898, when they faced Bangor City for the North Wales Senior Cup (this would later become the North Wales Amateur Cup), but lost the final 3–0 to Bangor. The following season, the club would reach its highest position during their tenure within the league, earning third position in the league, although this was followed up the next season by returning to their familiar fifth place in the league. However, after being engulfed by the Baron Corvo episode of 1899, the team eventually resigned from the North Wales Coast League at the end of the 1900–01 season, and joined the Chester & District League Division One for a season. After finishing seventh in the nine-team league, the club withdrew from the league after just a season. Holywell returned to competitive football in the 1904–05 season when they joined the local Flintshire League, but finished bottom of the table having won no games all season, drawing just four games, and suffering a two-point deduction for playing an ineligible player.

=== Holywell United and Holywell Victoria ===
During the middle of the 1900s, Holywell F.C. changed its name to Holywell United F.C. before changing its name once again to Holywell Victoria F.C. as they competed in the Flintshire League structure. After a couple years of playing in the Flintshire League, the club switched back to the Chester & District League. During their three-year stay in the regional league, The Vics competed in Division One of the structure, finishing as high as third place in the 1908–09 season.

The club later rejoined the North Wales Coast League for the 1912–13 season under the Holywell United monicker they won multiple trophies. In their debut season in the league, Holywell United finished in seventh position. However, in the following 1913–14 season, they achieved the North Wales Coast League and Amateur Cup double, by earning 15 victories from their 17 league games and also beating Colwyn Bay 1–0 in the final at Rhyl. They almost made it a treble-winning season as Holywell United also made it to the final of the Welsh Amateur Cup, but lost 0–1 to Cardiff Corinthians at the neutral venue of Newtown. It was during this period when Holywell United hosted their biggest game at that time, playing a friendly match against Everton XI at their Ffordd Fer ground. The Merseysiders included at least five players with English First Division experience within the team, and ran out 4–1 winners in front of a large Holywell crowd.

After World War I, Holywell United finished as the North Wales Coast League runners-up to Holyhead Railway Institute in the 1920–21 season, ending up just three points behind the league champions and scoring 92 goals that season, almost two dozen more goals than any other team in the league for that season. They also reached the final of the North Wales Coast Amateur Cup once again but lost to Holyhead 3–1. However, in the following season's NW Coast Cup final, which was to be a replay of the previous season's final, Holywell defeated Holyhead 1–0 in the final played at Llandudno, with Hewitt scoring the game's only goal.

From the 1921–22 season until the 1928–29 season, Holywell United competed in the newly formed Welsh National League (North), but could not replicate the high performances of previous years and had limited success during this period of time. Nonetheless, the club did manage to reach the semi-finals of the 1926-27 Welsh Cup - the furthest a Holywell-based club had gotten in the national cup competition up to that date (and later matched by Holywell Town's 2013-14 run to the last four. Their historic cup run was as follows before it was decisively ended by Rhyl in Colwyn Bay at the semi-final stage:

- Round Three: Conway (a) 4–2
- Round Four: Denbigh Town (h) 3–2
- Round Five: Buckley (h) 4–0
- Round Six: Lovell's Athletic (h) 2–0
- Semi-Finals: Rhyl (n) 1–5

The club also reached two consecutive Welsh Amateur Cup finals in 1926 and 1927, replicating the feat of twelve years prior. On both occasions, United took on Newport-based side Lovell's Athletic in the finals held at Newtown and Flint respectively, and lost both fixtures by a 0–2 scoreline as their opponents won two of their three consecutive cups.

=== Holywell Arcadians ===
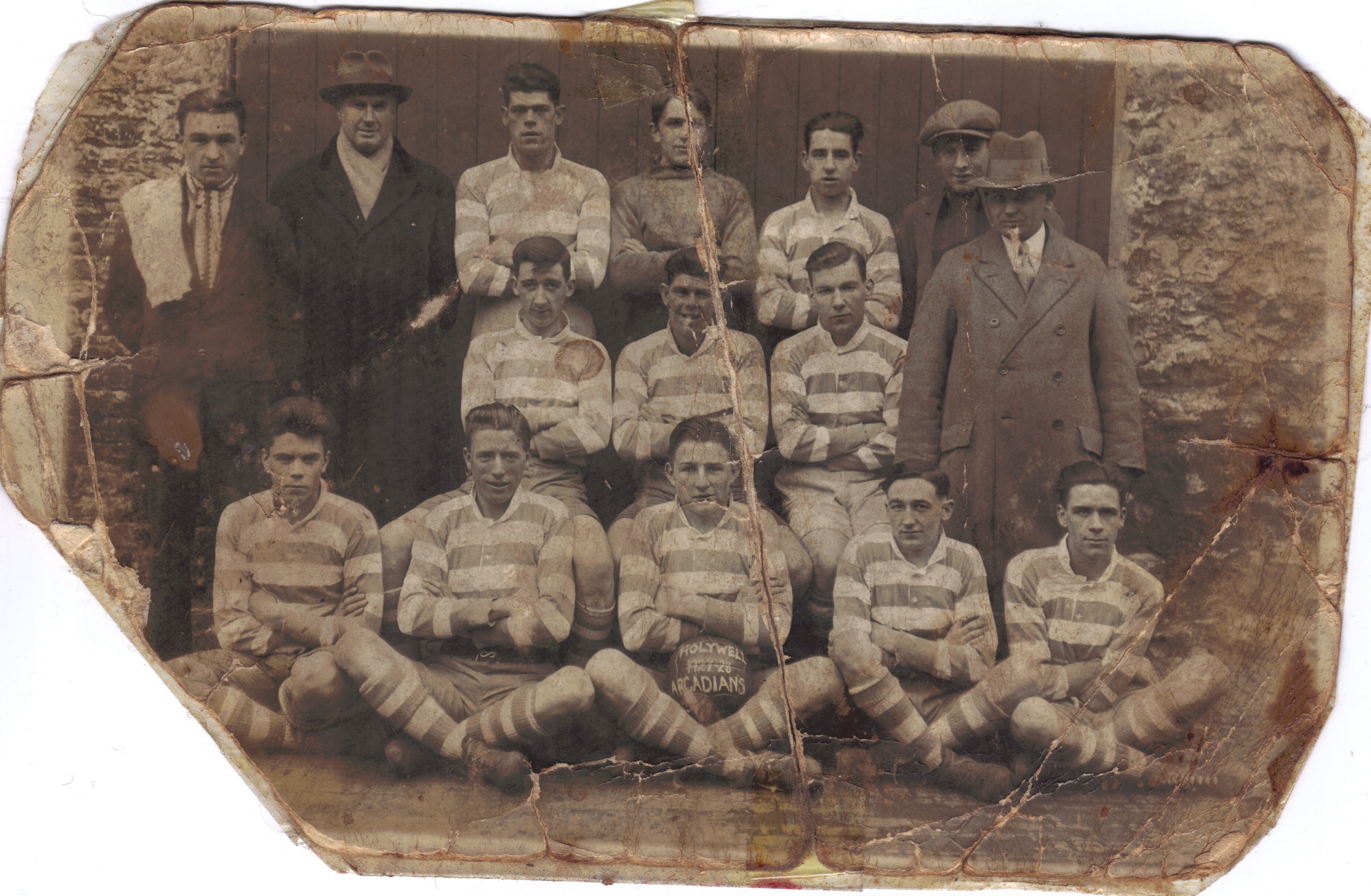
Holywell Arcadians Football Team 1927–1928

During the mid-to-late 1920s, the club first appeared under the new name of Holywell Arcadians, and competed in Division 2 (East) of the Welsh National League. For the following three seasons, Holywell Arcadians competed in the Welsh Football League, which ran alongside the North Wales Football Combination, and was the forerunner of the Welsh League (North). The Arcadians became two-time Welsh Football League champions by getting the title in the 1930–31 and 1932–33 seasons, as well as being runners-up in between.

== History of Holywell Town ==
In 1946, former soldiers who had been demobilised and returned home from fighting in World War II established the club at Halkyn Road, where it has played its home games ever since. It was also around this period that the moniker of The Wellmen was adopted by the club, a nickname which the club still uses to this day.

=== Post-War Period (1945-70) ===
==== Success in the League and Cups ====
In 1947 Holywell Town won both The Alves Cup and the Waterfall Cup, and the North Wales Coast FA Amateur Cup. The Wellmen beat Barmouth 2–0 in the 1949 final held at Llandudno.

Further achievements came to Holywell when they joined the Welsh League (North) in the 1949–50 season. They finished in fifth place in their debut season and achieved a further two top-half placements in the following seasons. In the 1952–53 season when Holywell Town became the Welsh League (North) champions for the first and only time. They won by a margin of three points against Flint Town United whilst scoring 119 goals in 34 league games. Two years later Holywell Town finished six points behind the Silkmen, although the club was awarded the Alves Cup by virtue of their final league position.

Holywell Town triumphed in the North Wales Coast Amateur Cup once more in the 1957–58 campaign, nine years after their post-war cup victory, by heavily defeating Gwalchmai 6–0 at Bangor City's Farrar Road ground. Twelve months later, they would return to the NWC Amateur Cup final, for the ninth time, to defend their trophy against a strong Porthmadoc side at Bangor. The match finished 1–1 with Holywell, who had missed an 11th-minute penalty, equalising in the 83rd minute through George Davies. This led to a replay being played a week later, and it was to become a dramatic affair. Twice Holywell led the replay only for Portmadoc to come back strongly and take a 3–2 advantage in the game, and despite having centre-forward Owen Davies injured, Holywell snatched an equaliser with the last kick of normal time. Although Holywell dramatically came back into the match and forced extra time, it proved too much for Holywell's ten men, however, and Port ran in five more goals to eventually lift the cup. The two sides met again in the 1963 final, although Holywell fielded an under-strength team in the final, with goalkeeper Reg Banton playing with a broken finger. Unsurprisingly, Portmadoc won the second cup final again by a 3–0 scoreline.

==== Record Attendance, Yet Trophyless 1960s ====
Success at senior level continued to elude the club throughout the 1960s. Holywell Town managed to reach the final of the Welsh Amateur Cup in the 1961–62 season, the first final appearance in the tournament since Holywell United's loss to Lovell's Athletic in 1927. The final was a repeat of the 1914 final when they took on Cardiff Corinthians, and sadly lightning struck twice for the Holywell side as the Corries won the fixture played at Newtown 3–2. It was also during the same season that the record attendance for a Holywell game was set in 1962 when 3000 spectators packed into Halkyn Road for a 1961-62 Welsh Cup sixth-round tie with Swansea Town. Despite the record attendance, the home failed to win the tie, with the professional English Football League side winning 2–1.

The club reached another cup final two seasons later when they got to the 1963 North Wales Coast Challenge Cup final, but fell to the legendary Borough United, who also won the Welsh League (North) title, the Cookson Cup, and famously the 1962-63 Welsh Cup in a quadruple-winning season for the Llandudno Junction side. Alas, success continued to elude the Wellmen during the first half of the 1960s.

Holywell Town maintained their membership of the Welsh League (North) for 17 consecutive seasons from the 1949–50 season until the 1965–66 season, when they finished bottom of the league and just one point behind 14th-placed side Blaenau Ffestiniog. Thereafter, Holywell Town left the Welsh League (North) and played in the local football leagues.

Between the two North Wales Amateur Cup finals with Porthmadoc, the record attendance for a Holywell game was set in 1962 when 3000 spectators packed into Halkyn Road for a Welsh Cup sixth-round tie with Swansea Town. Despite the record attendance, the home failed to win the tie, with the Swans winning 2–1.

Success at senior level continued to elude the club, despite reaching both the Welsh Amateur Cup Final in 1961–62, losing 3–2 to Cardiff Corinthians and the North Wales Coast Challenge Cup Final two seasons later, losing there to Borough United.

Holywell Town maintained their membership of the Welsh League (North) for 17 seasons from the 1949–50 season until the 1965–66 season, when they finished bottom of the league just one point behind Blaenau Ffestiniog. Thereafter, Holywell Town left the Welsh League (North) and played in the local football leagues.

=== Return to Prominence and Becoming Founding Members (1970-92) ===
==== The Clwyd League ====
Throughout the 1970s and 1980s, Holywell played in the local football league system, most notably in the Clwyd League system which, as its name suggests, had teams from the old northeastern county of Clwyd. In the 1975–76 season, the club was competing towards the bottom end of the Welsh pyramid but managed to win that season's Welsh League (North) Division 5, before clinching the Clwyd League Division 3 title in the following season (as well as the North Wales Coast Junior Challenge Cup) and somehow got themselves immediately promoted to Division 1 for the start of the 1977-78 campaign.

In their debut season in Division 1, Holywell finished in an impressive fourth place in the table, positioned behind local rivals Courtaulds Greenfield, Flint Town United, and Point of Ayr, and conceded just 21 goals in 26 league fixtures (the league's second-best defence that season). The Wellmen continued to play in the top division of the Clwyd League system for the next nine seasons, achieving a runners-up spot in the 1980–81 season behind the undefeated league champions Connah's Quay Nomads.

However, in the 1986–87 season, the club finally earned some silverware when they won the Clwyd League Premier Division title as well as triumphing in the North Wales Coast Challenge Cup competition to earn a league and cup double. Throwing off the disappointment of cup final defeat in 1964, the Wellmen played local rivals and defending cup holders Mold Alexandra (at Flint) and won the cup 1–0, thanks to a goal after 78 minutes scored by Merfyn Edwards. The club continued to earn silverware during that period when they successfully defended their Clwyd League Premier Division title in the following season, winning it for the second time in a row.

==== Welsh Alliance and the Creation of the Cymru Alliance ====
After the success in the local football system, Holywell Town returned to the Welsh Alliance League (the successor of the old Welsh League (North) league) in the 1988–89 season, when they achieved a creditable top-five placing. Alas, they were unable to repeat the feat the following season when they concluded their campaign in 14th position and suffered a three-point deduction.

Holywell Town were selected to become founder members of the Cymru Alliance in 1990–91, the top-tier league for northern and central Welsh football clubs at that time. The Wellmen competed in the new league for two seasons, earning a 9th-place finish in Alliance's inaugural season and then achieving 11th position in the following season. In spite of Holywell's lowly league placement, they left the Cymru Alliance to ascend to become one of the founding members of the newly created national league - the League of Wales - for the 1992–93 season, with the Cymru Alliance become the northern and central second-tier league in the football pyramid structure.

=== League of Wales Era (1992-99) ===
==== The Inaugural Season ====
Holywell Town won both the Clwyd League Youth Cup and the Auxiliary Youth Cup, whilst also being runners-up in the Alves Cup. However, in the league, they became one of the surprise packages of the season. Under the management of Glyn Griffiths, aided by the 17 league goals from Ian Howat, and possessing the joint-third best defence in the league with just 48 goals conceded, the club finished the first LoW season in 6th position. This made Holywell the best-performing founding member to originate from the Cymru Alliance. One of the highlights of the season was doing the league double over pre-season title favourites Bangor City by achieving a 3–0 win at home on Boxing Day, and a season record 6–0 win away at Farrar Road.

==== Best Ever Finish and Subsequent Relegation ====
Holywell improved upon their league position in the second season of the League of Wales. The Wellmen concluded their schedule in 5th position - their highest-ever league placement in the current Welsh football pyramid structure. Alas, once Griffiths' reign as manager ended, inconsistency crept into the club's results and started to slide down the table, albeit, they still ended up in a respectable 8th place at the end of the 1994-95 season. However, the reality of competing in the Welsh top flight was starting to seriously affect the club's finances, and as budgets were cut, results further diminished in the League of Wales. The 1995-96 season saw Holywell finish in the bottom half of the League of Wales table for the first time and flirt with potential relegation, ending up seven points ahead of the relegation zone in 16th position. Their tenure in Wales' top flight concluded in the following season when Holywell finished the season in a disappointing 20th position, one position ahead of Briton Ferry Athletic and ten points adrift of safety.

==== Promotion and Second Relegation ====
Even though they had been relegated for the first time from the League of Wales, Holywell Town's initial exile away from the top division was a brief period as they rebounded back in the 1997-98 season. In their season's return to the Cymru Alliance, the club managed to win that season's Cymru Alliance League Cup by beating Oswestry Town and finish as runners-up in the division, with the league's best defensive record of just 29 goals conceded in 36 league games. Although they finished four points behind league champions and local rivals Rhydymwyn (who had beaten Holywell 4–1 to confirm the championship), Rhyd were unable to accept the promotion to the League of Wales allowing Holywell to take their promotion berth and make a swift return to the League of Wales.

Their reappearance in the League of Wales became a nightmare for the club as Holywell Town finished rock bottom of the 1998-99 table and suffered a second relegation from the LoW in three seasons. From their 32-game season, the Wellmen only picked up three wins and nine draws all season, possessed the league's worst defence (86 goals conceded), and ended up five points behind the 16th-placed side Rhyl. That was the last time Holywell Town competed in Wales' top-flight league.

=== The New Millennium in the Cymru Alliance (1999–2006) ===
From the 1999–2000 season to the 2005-06 season, Holywell Town played their football back in the Cymru Alliance, the then-second tier of the Welsh football league system. Their first season back in the Alliance was a real struggle for the Wellmen although the club avoided a potential second consecutive by finishing seven points above the bottom club Corwen Amateurs after achieving a 16th-place placement in the league. Matters improved in 2000–01 when the Wellmen rose to 10th position, mid-way in the league, in a season when they were one of six former League of Wales clubs to compete in that season's Cymru Alliance.

The following season, the club returned to struggling ways in the league, and in 2001–02 the Wellmen finished a disappointing 16th position once again, narrowly avoiding relegation from the league by a margin of six points. It was at that point that the club decided to part company with their Manchester-based manager and squad in favour of a more local set-up in order to improve performances on the pitch. Unfortunately, their revised set-up fared no better when in 2002–03, they finished bottom of the table – with a nine-point deduction adding to a dismal playing record. Thankfully for the club, Holywell Town narrowly avoided relegation to the third tier despite their lowly finish as the league was short of its full complement of teams. Another bottom-half finish occurred in the next season, but were securely safe from the drop despite being 14th in the final table.

Although they saw an improvement to fortunes under the guidance of Andy Nicholls during the 2004–05 season, by finishing in 9th position, they were eventually relegated to the Welsh Alliance League in the following season when they finished 17th in the league, nine points adrift of safety, and with only their local rival Halkyn United below them. After seven seasons in the second tier, and occasional flirtations with relegation punctuated by sporadic mid-table security, Holywell Town's tenure in the Cymru Alliance concluded to return to the Welsh Alliance for the first time since 1990.

=== Return to the Welsh Alliance League & Cup Performances (2006-15) ===
==== Welsh Alliance League Division One ====

2011 FAW Trophy final starting line-up against Conwy United.

In their first four seasons playing in the Welsh Alliance League, Holywell Town recorded consecutive bottom-half finishes, with their lowest position being 14th in the 2008-09 season. Under manager Mike Thomas, and with the club placing greater emphasis on fielding local players, Holywell finished third in the 2010-11 Welsh Alliance League Division One and won the FAW Trophy for the first time, securing their first trophy in 13 years. They defeated Welsh Alliance Division One champions Conwy United 3-2 at Belle Vue in Rhyl after overturning a 2-0 deficit by scoring three late goals to win the cup.

In the 2011-12 season, Holywell challenged for the Division One title but lost 3-1 to title rivals Holyhead Hotspur in the penultimate league match. They subsequently finished second, a one point behind the Ynys Môn side. Holywell also lost 2-1 to Holyhead Hotspur in the Mawddach Cup final.

For the 2012-13 season, Mike Thomas left the role of Holywell Town manager and was replaced by club captain Johnny Haseldin, who was appointed as player-manager. In his first season in charge, Holywell finished third in the Welsh Alliance Division One, five points behind champions Caernarfon Town. They also reached the semi-finals of the FAW Trophy and the final of the Cookson Cup, losing to Caernarfon Town on both occasions, 3-1 in the former, played at Llandudno, and 1-0 in the latter fixture at Conwy.

==== 2013-14 Welsh Cup ====

2013-14 Welsh Cup semi-final starting line-up against Aberystwyth Town.

In the 2013-14 season, Holywell Town finished second in the Welsh Alliance League Division One behind Denbigh Town and remained in the division, despite scoring 103 goals. Striker Sam Jones finished as the division’s leading goalscorer and was named Division One Player of the Year. Holywell also won the Cookson Cup for the first time, defeating Llanrug United 5-1 in the final.

Holywell became the first third-tier club to reach the semi-finals of the Welsh Cup. Their run to the last four included victories over Cymru Alliance clubs Penrhyncoch, Penycae, and Porthmadog, as well as a 3-2 win over Welsh Premier League side Newtown in the fourth round.

The 2013-14 Welsh Cup semi-final match had implications for qualification for the 2014-15 UEFA Europa League. Welsh Premier League champions The New Saints had already qualified for the 2014-15 UEFA Champions League and had reached the Welsh Cup final earlier in the day after defeating Bala Town 2-1 in the other semi-final match, meaning the Europa League qualifying place allocated to the Welsh Cup winner would pass to the other finalist. This qualification route for cup finalists was subsequently abolished by UEFA in the following season.

The semi-final match was played at the neutral venue of Latham Park in Newtown, where Holywell faced another Welsh Premier League club, Aberystwyth Town. The match was broadcast live on the Welsh-language channel, S4C. Holywell took the lead after eight minutes but were defeated 3-1, ending their run in the competition. The result meant that Aberystwyth Town advanced to the final and subsequently qualified for the following season's UEFA Europa League.

Holywell Town's 2013-14 Welsh Cup Run
Round	Opponent	Venue	Result
Qualifying Round 2	Llannerch-y-medd	Home	8-1
First Round	Penrhyncoch	Home	3-0
Second Round	Penycae	Home	3-0
Third Round	Llandrindod Wells	Away	3-1
Fourth Round	Newtown	Home	3-2
Quarter-final	Porthmadog	Home	2-1
Semi-final	Aberystwyth Town	Neutral	1-3

==== 2014-15 Treble ====

2015 FAW Trophy final starting line-up against Penrhyndeudraeth.

In their ninth consecutive season in the Welsh Alliance League, Holywell Town won the 2014-15 Division One title and were promoted to the Cymru Alliance. They finished the season with 71 points from 26 matches, scoring 119 league goals and recording a goal difference of +100. Their league campaign included a 15-1 victory over Llanfairpwll and a 10-0 win over Pwllheli. They also recorded a 23-match winning run in all competitions between August 2014 and January 2015.

Holywell also reached three cup finals during the season. They lost the Cookson Cup final 2-1 to Llanrug United at Y Morfa, Conwy, in their third consecutive Cookson Cup final, before winning the FAW Trophy for the second time in four seasons with a 4-2 victory over fellow Welsh Alliance team Penrhyndeudraeth in Llandudno. They then won the Mawddach Challenge Cup for the first time, defeating Llanrug United 3-2 after extra time at the Nantporth Stadium in Bangor for their third trophy of the season.

=== 2015 to Present ===
==== The Cymru Alliance and a Relegation ====
In their first three seasons back in the Cymru Alliance, Holywell Town finished fifth in each season. Their highest finish during this period came in 2017–18, when they finished four points behind third-placed Airbus UK Broughton, and recorded the league’s second-highest goalscoring total and second-best defensive record. They also reached the North East Wales FA (NEWFA) Challenge Cup final twice, losing 2-0 to Cefn Druids in 2016, and 2-1 to Ruthin Town in 2018.

At the end of the 2017-18 season, Johnny Haseldin resigned as Holywell player-manager after six years in charge and was replaced by centre-back Gareth Sudlow, who took on the role of player-manager. Sudlow managed the club for ten matches before resigning in late September 2018, and Haseldin returned as player-manager. Holywell won three of their 15 matches between October and March, leaving them near the bottom of the Cymru Alliance table. They subsequently took 11 points from their final five matches, but Penrhyncoch, who were also battling relegation, collected 11 points during the same period, including a 3-3 draw between the teams in mid-April, leaving the two clubs level on points. In their final league fixture, Penrhyncoch scored twice late on to defeat Conwy Borough 3-2, finishing above Holywell on goal difference and confirming Holywell’s relegation to the third tier.

==== Welsh National League ====
Following the conclusion of the 2018-19 Cymru Alliance season, fourth-placed Bangor City were initially deducted 42 points by the FAW following multiple alleged breaches of FAW Rules. The points deduction would have moved Bangor to the bottom of the Cymru Alliance table and lifted Holywell Town out of the relegation zone. Bangor City appealed the initial ruling, and an independent review panel subsequently reduced the deduction to 21 points. As a result, Bangor finished above Holywell on goal difference, confirming Holywell's relegation to the third tier.

For the 2019-20 season, Holywell Town were placed in the Welsh National League (Wrexham Area) Premier Division rather than the Welsh Alliance League Division One, where they had previously played. However, the season was suspended after 17 league matches because of the COVID-19 pandemic and subsequently brought to an early conclusion. Holywell were declared WNL Premier Division champions with a superior points-per-game (PPG) ratio, ahead of Rhostyllen and Cefn Albion, and were promoted to the second tier.

Holywell Town were the final champions of the Welsh National League (Wrexham Area) Premier Division before the competition was discontinued as part of the reorganisation of the Welsh football pyramid. Many of its clubs subsequently joined the newly established Ardal North West or Ardal North East regional leagues, which formed part of the new FAW-run Ardal Leagues structure at the third tier.

==== Cymru North ====
Holywell Town returned to the second tier following the restructuring of the Welsh football pyramid in 2019, which saw the FAW take direct control of the second tier and establish the Cymru North as part of the greater Cymru Leagues organisation. However, the league was not played in the 2020–21 season after the FAW cancelled football below the Cymru Premier because of the COVID-19 pandemic. Holywell subsequently competed in the Cymru North for five consecutive seasons, finishing no lower than fourth, which occurred in 2021-22, three points behind the third-placed Guilsfield.

In the 2022-23 season, Holywell finished as runners-up in the Cymru North, four points behind champions Colwyn Bay. After taking one point from their opening three matches, they subsequently recorded a 25-game winning streak and conceded 22 goals, the best defence in the league. They also reached the quarter-finals of the Welsh Cup, where they lost 2-1 to eventual finalists Penybont, and won the NEWFA Challenge Cup for the first time, defeating fellow Cymru North side Gresford Athletic 3-1 in the final.

The following season, Holywell won the 2023-24 Cymru North title, their first second-tier championship and their highest league finish since their relegation from the League of Wales in 1999. They finished three points ahead of local rivals Flint Town United and seven points ahead of fellow Flintshire side Airbus UK Broughton. Manager Johnny Haseldin was also named Cymru North Manager of the Season at the 2023-24 FAW National League Awards. Despite winning the league, Holywell were not promoted to the Cymru Premier because they did not obtain a Tier 1 licence, whereas, Flint Town United, who had obtained a Tier 1 licence, were promoted instead.

Holywell then recorded two consecutive third-place finishes in the Cymru North, in 2024-25 and 2025-26. The expansion of the Cymru Premier from 12 to 16 clubs for the 2026-27 season meant that the top three Cymru North clubs in the 2025-26 season were eligible for promotion, subject to obtaining a Tier 1 licence. Holywell finished in the promotion spots, 12 points ahead of fourth-placed Newtown. Striker Jamie Breese was also named Cymru North Player of the Season and finished as the league’s leading goalscorer with 24 goals.

Holywell Town players Jamie Breese, Craig Lindfield and Danny Sullivan were named in the Cymru North 2025/26 Team Of The Season.

Holywell were initially denied a Tier 1 licence for the 2026-27 season, putting their promotion in doubt. Following an appeal, the FAW awarded Holywell a Tier 1 licence, confirming their return to the top flight after 27 years.

== Stadium ==
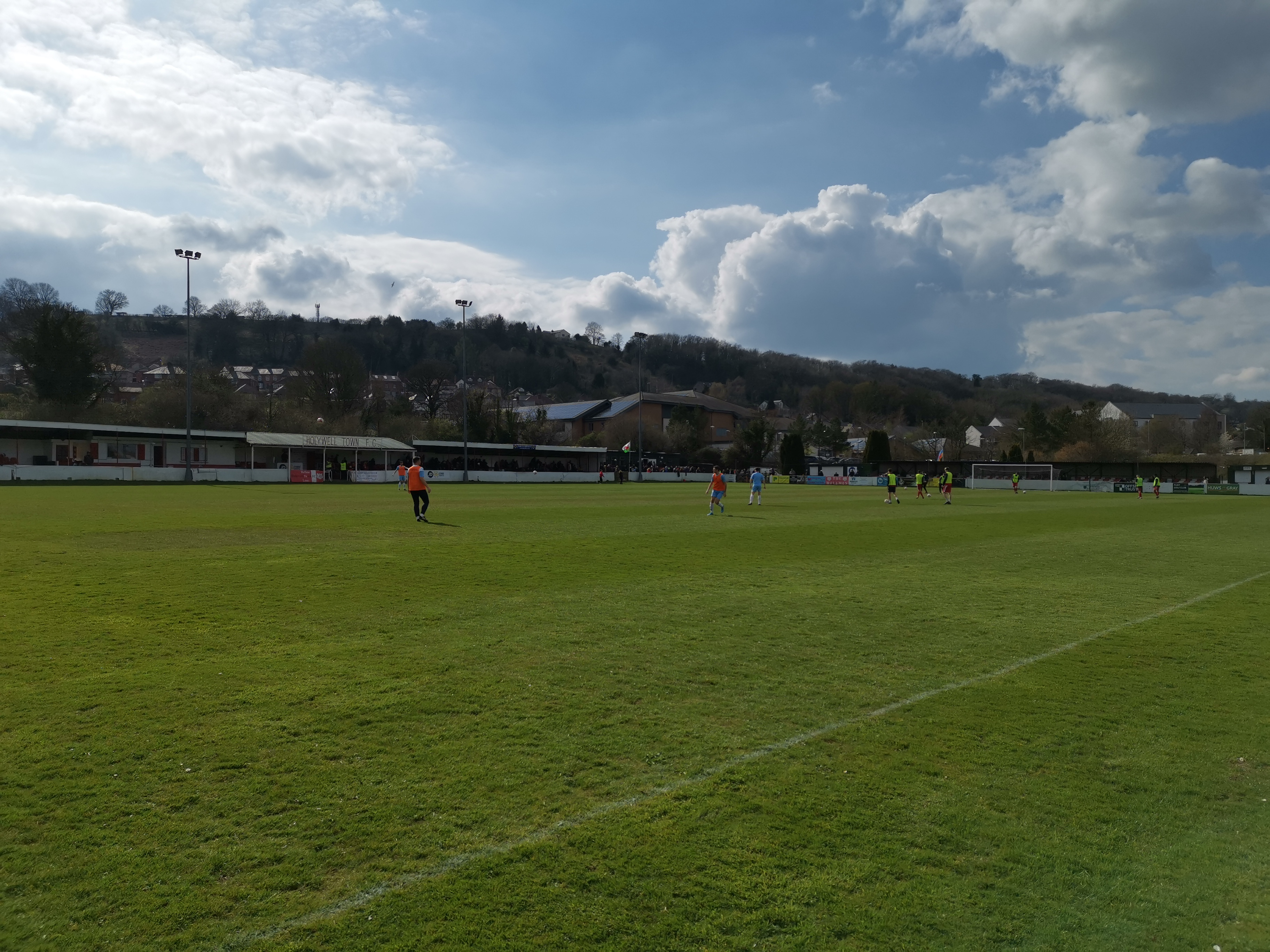
Halkyn Road, home of Holywell Town F.C.

Holywell Town currently plays at the Bartons North Wales Stadium, located on Halkyn Road (Welsh: Ffordd Helygain). The ground is just a short walk from Holywell's town centre and is located behind and below the town's community hospital.

The ground can accommodate 2,000 spectators, with 650 seated and an additional 250 covered, with plenty of space for car parking behind both the main stand and The Roger Long Stand. In recent years, the Halkyn Road ground has been dramatically improved, with increased parking facilities and improved drainage, and the stadium has hosted many Youth International fixtures. As with many stadiums around the area, the stadium has its own permanent LED floodlights, which allow evening games to be played.

The main stand is the oldest part of the ground and runs along the hospital side of the pitch. It offers both covered seating and standing areas, as well as housing both the dressing rooms and media section. Located between the main stand and the ground entrance is the clubhouse, which was constructed in the summer of 2014. It is where hot and cold drinks and snacks are available, as well as alcoholic drinks that can be consumed before and after games.

On the opposite side of the ground is the newest stand in the ground, 'The Stamford Stand', which was completed in September 2024 and provides 200 covered seats.

At the Town End of the ground is 'The Roger Long Stand', which provides 250 covered seats as well as space for disabled supporters. The stand, which was installed in April 2017, is named in memory of Roger Long, a lifelong supporter of the club who died in 2022.

At the Halkyn End of the ground is 'The Martyn 'Farmer' Suite', the ground's corporate suite that has been dedicated in memory of Martyn "Farmer" Evans, a former coach and supporter of the club, who passed away in April 2026.

- Record attendance = 3,000 – 1961-62 Welsh Cup 6th round versus Swansea Town in 1962.

== Overview ==
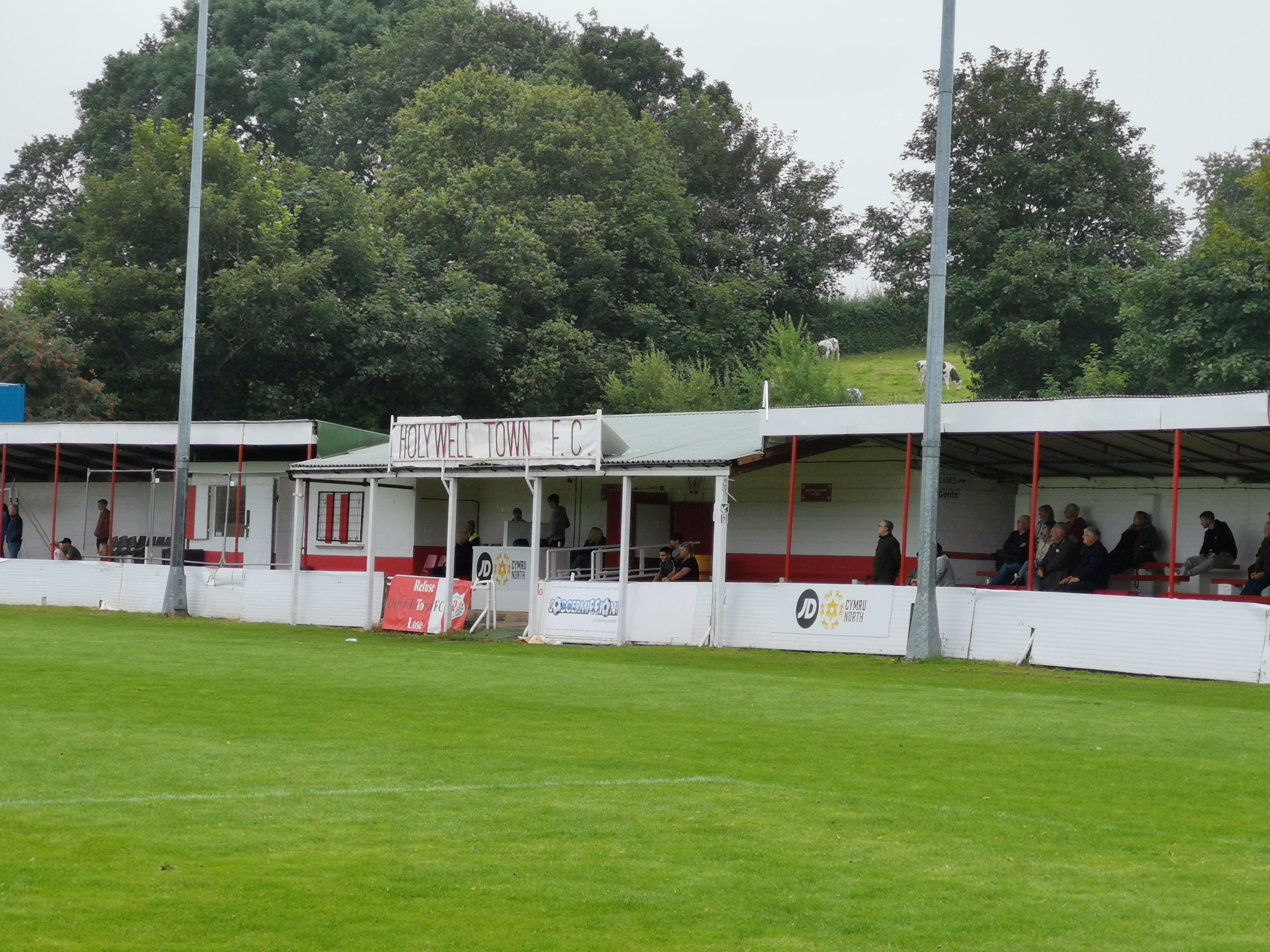
The main stand at Halkyn Road, home of Holywell Town

The Wellmen's first-choice strip is their traditional red-and-white striped shirts, with red shorts, and red socks. The away strip for the 2026–27 season is a blue-and-black striped shirt with blue shorts and socks. The kits are manufactured by O'Neills.

Although the team's nearest rivals are Greenfield, it is usually considered a friendly rivalry with co-operation practiced between the two clubs. Holywell's traditional and fiercest rivals are Flint Town United, which originates from the historical rivalry between the two old towns of Flintshire, and is also one of the oldest football rivalries in Welsh league football.

Holywell also had local rivalries between fellow Flintshire sides, Mold Alexandra and Buckley Town, as well as recently having competitive rivalries with Caernarfon Town, Denbigh Town (whom they played their first game against in 1880), and Holyhead Hotspur, all of which originate when the teams were competing for the Welsh Alliance League title in the 2010s.

Holywell Town produces an award-winning matchday programme for all first-team matches as it was placed first in the Soccer Club Shop Programme Awards for six consecutive seasons. The programme has also been awarded the best programme produced throughout the whole of Wales for the 2013–14 season, as well as being second-best programme produced throughout the whole of Wales for both the 2010–11 and 2011–12 seasons, and voted third-best in the whole of Wales for the 2012–13 season. In addition, the programme was also voted best in the 2010–11, 2011–12, 2012–13 & 2013–14 Welsh Alliance Season Awards by winning the Best Matchday Programme award. The match programme has since ceased to be printed and is now just produced electronically every matchday.

== Honours ==
- Founding Members of North Wales Coast League
- Founding Members of Cymru Alliance League
- Founding Members of League of Wales

=== League ===
- North Wales Coast League
  - Champions: 1913–14**
  - Runners-up: 1920–21**
- Welsh Football League
  - Champions: 1930–31+, 1932–33+
  - Runners-up: 1931–32+
- Welsh League (North)/Welsh Alliance League
  - Champions: 1952–53, 2014–15
  - Runners-up: 1954–55
- Clwyd Premier League
  - Champions: 1986–87, 1987–88
  - Runners-up: 1980–81
- Clwyd League Division 1
  - Champions: 1989–90
- Clwyd League Division 3
  - Champions: 1976–77
- Welsh League (North) Division 5
  - Champions: 1975–76
- Cymru Alliance
  - Runners-up: 1997–98
- Cymru North
  - Champions: 2023–24
  - Runners-up: 2022–23
- Welsh National League (Wrexham Area) Premier Division
  - Champions: 2019–20
- Clwyd Reserve Division
  - Champions: 2010–11
- Welsh National League Reserves and Colts Division
  - Champions: 2018-19

=== Cups ===
- Welsh Amateur Cup/FAW Trophy
  - Winners: 2010–11, 2014–15
  - Finalists: 1913–14**, 1925–26**, 1926–27**, 1961–62
- North Wales Senior Cup
  - Finalists: 1898*
- North Wales Coast Amateur Cup
  - Winners: 1913–14**, 1921–22**, 1948–49, 1957–58
  - Finalists: 1920–21**, 1930–31, 1958–59, 1962–63
- North Wales Coast Challenge Cup
  - Winners: 1986–87
- North Wales Coast West Football League Division One Cup
  - Winners: 2025–26
- North Wales Coast Youth Cup
  - Winners: 1975–76
- North Wales Coast FA Junior Challenge Cup
  - Winners: 1976–77
- Alves Cup
  - Winners: 1946–47, 1953–54
- Waterfall Cup
  - Winners: 1946–47
- President Cup
  - Winners: 1987–88
- Clwyd League Cup
  - Winners: 1987–88
- Clwyd League Auxiliary Cup
  - Winners: 1992–93
- Clwyd League Youth Cup
  - Winners: 1992–93
- Cymru Alliance League Cup
  - Winners: 1997–98
- Mawddach Challenge Cup / Barritt Trophy
  - Winners: 2014–15
  - Finalists: 2011–12
- Reserve Premier Cup
  - Finalists: 2011–12
- Horrace Wynne Cup
  - Finalists: 2011–12
- Cookson Cup
  - Winners: 2013–14
  - Finalists: 2012–13, 2014–15
- North East Wales FA Challenge Cup
  - Winners: 2022–23
  - Finalists: 2015–16, 2017–18, 2024-25, 2025–26

* = As Holywell F.C., ** = As Holywell United, + = As Holywell Arcadians

== Holywell Town Board and Staff ==
=== Holywell Town Board ===
Position at Club	Name
Chair; Treasurer	(Wales) Tracey Jones
General Secretary	(Wales) Steve Roberts
Commercial Manager; Club Director	(Wales) Gareth Saunders
Media Officer; Club Photographer; Club Director	(Wales) Dan Davies
Ground Manager	(Wales) Justin Evans
Club Director	(Wales) Claire Baker-Williams
Club Director	(Wales) Lisa Doleman
Club Director	(Wales) Tina Long
Consultant Director	(Wales) Simon Rose
Community Liaison Officer	(Wales) Chris Noble-Williams

=== Holywell Town Staff ===
Position in Team	Name
Manager	(England) John Haseldin
Coach	(England) Mark Connolly
Coach	(Wales) Sean Eardley
Coach	(Wales) Lee Pope
GK Coach	(Wales) David Walsh
Captain	(Republic of Ireland) Danny Sullivan
Vice Captain	(Wales) Ryan Edwards
Physio	(Wales) Elijah Beattie
Development Squad Manager	(Wales) Geraint Rowlands
Under 19s Manager	(England) John Haseldin

== Players ==
As of 21 October 2026

=== First-team squad ===
Note: Flags indicate national team as defined under FIFA eligibility rules; some limited exceptions apply. Players may hold more than one non-FIFA nationality.

No.	Pos.	Nation	Player
1	GK	WAL	Alex Swindell
2	DF	ENG	Casey Bedford
3	DF	ENG	Mikey Davies
4	MF	ZIM	Alec Mudimu
5	DF	WAL	Ieuan Hewitt
6	DF	IRL	Danny Sullivan (captain)
7	MF	WAL	Tom Bibby
8	MF	USA	Taner Dogan
9	FW	WAL	Owen Davies
10	FW	ENG	Mark Winslade
12	DF	ENG	Jack Tierney
14	FW	WAL	Fabrizio Murtas

No.	Pos.	Nation	Player
15	MF	ZIM	Thuso Nyomi
16	MF	ENG	Dominic McGiveron
18	MF	WAL	Caio Hughes
19	FW	ENG	Jack Sconce
20	MF	ENG	Sam Baker
22	MF	WAL	Alfie Edwards
24	MF	WAL	Jacob Byron
27	FW	CIV	Florian Yonsian
28	DF	ENG	Harvey Morris
31	GK	ENG	Elliot Collins
34	MF	WAL	Ryan Edwards (vice captain)

== Current history ==
Season	League	Position	Played	Won	Drawn	Lost	For	Against	Points
2009–10	Welsh Alliance League	10th	30	13	7	10	72	43	46
2010–11	Welsh Alliance League Division 1	3rd	30	17	3	10	68	40	54
2011–12	Welsh Alliance League Division 1	2nd	30	23	3	4	77	29	72
2012–13	Welsh Alliance League Division 1	3rd	28	18	7	3	98	38	61
2013–14	Welsh Alliance League Division 1	2nd	28	20	5	3	103	23	65
2014–15	Welsh Alliance League Division 1	1st	26	23	2	1	119	19	71
2015–16	Cymru Alliance	5th	30	15	7	8	55	34	52
2016–17	Cymru Alliance	5th	30	14	8	8	52	45	50
2017–18	Cymru Alliance	5th	28	14	8	6	75	37	50
2018–19	Cymru Alliance	14th	30	8	6	16	38	58	30
2019–20	Welsh National League (Wrexham Area) Premier Division	1st	17	13	3	1	62	8	42
2020–21	Cymru North	–	–	–	–	–	–	–	–
2021–22	Cymru North	4th	28	15	5	8	68	36	50
2022–23	Cymru North	2nd	30	26	1	3	75	22	79
2023–24	Cymru North	1st	30	26	3	1	79	17	81
2024–25	Cymru North	3rd	30	18	3	9	56	41	57
2025–26	Cymru North	3rd	30	18	6	6	78	40	60

* = 3pts deducted
