= 2014–15 Welsh Alliance League =

Welsh Alliance League
- Season: 2014–15
- Dates: 9 August 2014 – 4 May 2015
- Champions: Division 1 – Holywell Town; Division 2 – St Asaph City
- Matches: 422
- Goals: 1,912 (4.53 per match)
- Biggest home win: Division 1 Holywell Town 15–1 Llanfairpwll (11 October 2014); Division 2 Greenfield 13–1 Gaerwen (4 May 2015)
- Biggest away win: Division 1 Gwalchmai 0–6 Holywell Town (9 August 2014); Llanfairpwll 0–6 Holywell Town (28 February 2015); Division 2 Gaerwen 0–8 St Asaph City (4 April 2015)
- Highest attendance: 465 – Division 1 Barmouth & Dyffryn United 6–2 Llanrwst United (23 August 2014); 350 – Division 2 Llangefni Town 1–1 Llannerch-y-medd (25 February 2015)
- All statistics correct as of 6 March 2019.

The 2014–15 Welsh Alliance League, known as the Lock Stock Welsh Alliance League for sponsorship reasons, is the 31st season of the Welsh Alliance League, which consists of two divisions: the third and fourth levels of the Welsh football pyramid.

There are fourteen teams in Division 1 and sixteen teams in Division 2, with the champions of Division 1 promoted to the Cymru Alliance. In Division 2, the champions, second-place, and third-place teams are promoted to Division 1.

The season began on 9 August 2014 and concluded on 4 May 2015 with Holywell Town as Division 1 champions. In Division 2, St Asaph City were champions with Llangefni Town and Trearddur Bay finishing second and third place, respectively. All three teams were promoted to Division 1.

== Division 1 ==
=== Teams ===
Denbigh Town were champions in the previous season and were promoted to the Cymru Alliance. They were replaced by Division 2 champions Penrhyndeudraeth and runners-up Kinmel Bay Sports, who were promoted to Division 1.

Locations of the Division 1 teams of the 2014–15 Welsh Alliance League

==== Grounds and locations ====
Team	Location	Ground
Barmouth & Dyffryn United	Barmouth	Wern Mynach
Glan Conwy	Glan Conwy	Cae Ffwt
Glantraeth	Bodorgan	Trefdraeth
Gwalchmai	Gwalchmai	Maes Meurig
Holywell Town	Holywell	Halkyn Road
Kinmel Bay	Kinmel Bay	Cader Avenue
Llanberis	Llanberis	Ffordd Padarn
Llandudno Junction	Llandudno Junction	Arriva Ground
Llandyrnog United	Llandyrnog	Cae Nant
Llanfairpwll	Llanfairpwllgwyngyll	Maes Eilian
Llangefni Town	Llangefni	Bob Parry Field
Llanrug United	Llanrug	Eithin Duon
Llanrwst United	Llanrwst	Gwydir Park
Penrhyndeudraeth	Penrhyndeudraeth	Maes Y Parc
Pwllheli	Pwllheli	Leisure Centre, Recreation Road

=== League table ===
Pos	Team	Pld	W	D	L	GF	GA	GD	Pts	Promotion or relegation
1	Holywell Town (C, P)	26	23	2	1	119	19	+100	71	Promotion to Cymru Alliance
2	Llandudno Junction	26	17	5	4	77	39	+38	56	
3	Glantraeth	26	16	4	6	62	33	+29	52	
4	Llanrug United	26	14	6	6	66	43	+23	48	
5	Penrhyndeudraeth	26	12	6	8	55	44	+11	42	
6	Kinmel Bay	26	10	5	11	55	50	+5	35	
7	Gwalchmai	26	9	7	10	46	47	−1	34	
8	Barmouth & Dyffryn United	26	9	7	10	44	52	−8	34	
9	Llanberis	26	10	3	13	50	48	+2	33	
10	Pwllheli	26	10	3	13	58	70	−12	33	
11	Llandyrnog United	26	8	4	14	34	51	−17	28	
12	Glan Conwy	26	7	5	14	49	65	−16	26	
13	Llanrwst United	26	7	3	16	33	70	−37	24	
14	Llanfairpwll	26	0	0	26	17	134	−117	0	

Source: Welsh Alliance League, NonLeagueMatters
Rules for classification: 1) Points; 2) Goal difference; 3) Goals scored; 4) Matches won; 5) Play-off.
(C) Champions; (P) Promoted

=== Results ===
Home \ Away	BDU	GLC	GLA	GWA	HOL	KIN	LNB	LNJ	LLD	LPG	LRU	LRW	PEN	PWL
Barmouth & Dyffryn United	—	2–2	0–2	1–1	1–4	2–1	1–1	4–0	1–2	3–2	2–4	6–2	2–2	1–1
Glan Conwy	4–0	—	0–4	1–1	1–2	2–3	1–3	2–4	2–0	3–1	1–4	3–0	3–4	1–1
Glantraeth	0–0	5–1	—	4–0	2–1	1–0	1–3	2–0	4–1	6–0	1–0	1–4	3–3	4–1
Gwalchmai	3–1	2–1	1–3	—	0–6	0–3	2–1	1–3	3–3	7–0	0–1	6–0	1–2	3–1
Holywell Town	5–0	3–0	3–0	4–1	—	5–1	3–1	5–0	3–0	15–1	4–1	7–1	5–0	10–0
Kinmel Bay	1–1	2–2	2–1	0–1	4–4	—	1–2	2–3	3–2	5–0	1–5	8–0	2–1	3–5
Llanberis	3–1	5–0	1–2	0–1	1–1	1–3	—	3–5	4–0	7–0	2–3	1–2	1–5	1–4
Llandudno Junction	3–2	3–0	2–2	1–1	1–3	5–0	6–1	—	3–1	11–0	1–1	3–0	1–1	4–2
Llandyrnog United	1–2	2–2	3–1	1–1	0–5	2–1	2–0	1–2	—	4–1	0–1	1–2	1–2	2–1
Llanfairpwll	1–2	4–8	1–3	1–5	0–6	0–4	0–1	0–3	0–1	—	1–5	0–3	0–2	1–5
Llanrug United	2–3	3–4	1–0	2–2	0–5	2–2	1–1	3–3	4–1	7–0	—	4–0	1–1	4–2
Llanrwst United	1–2	0–3	1–3	5–2	0–3	0–0	1–2	0–3	1–1	2–0	1–2	—	3–1	2–3
Penrhyndeudraeth	1–3	4–2	2–2	1–1	0–2	3–1	1–0	0–2	1–0	8–2	0–1	5–2	—	5–1
Pwllheli	3–1	3–0	2–5	1–0	3–5	0–2	1–4	2–5	1–2	8–1	5–4	0–0	2–0	—

Source: Welsh Alliance League – Division 1 Results Grid, - NonLeagueMatters - Welsh Alliance League Division 1 - Results / Fixtures
Legend: Blue = home team win; Yellow = draw; Red = away team win.

== Division 2 ==
=== Teams ===
Penrhyndeudraeth were champions in the previous season and were promoted to Division 1 along with runners-up, Kinmel Bay Sports.

Locations of the Division 2 teams of the 2014–15 Welsh Alliance League

==== Grounds and locations ====
Team	Location	Ground
Amlwch Town	Amlwch	Lôn Bach
Bethesda Athletic	Bethesda	Parc Meurig
Blaenau Ffestiniog Amateur	Blaenau Ffestiniog	Cae Clyd
Gaerwen	Gaerwen	Lôn Groes
Greenfield	Greenfield	Bagillt Road
Halkyn United	Halkyn	Pant Newydd
Llangefni Town	Llangefni	Bob Parry Field
Llannerch-y-medd	Llanerch-y-medd	Tan Parc
Meliden	Meliden	Ffordd Tŷ Newydd
Mochdre Sports	Mochdre	Swan Road
Mynydd Llandegai	Mynydd Llandygai	Mynydd Llandegai
Nantlle Vale	Penygroes	Maes Dulyn
Penmaenmawr Phoenix	Penmaenmawr	Cae Sling
Pentraeth	Pentraeth	Bryniau Field
St Asaph City	St Asaph	Roe Plas
Trearddur Bay	Trearddur Bay	Lon Isallt

=== League table ===
Pos	Team	Pld	W	D	L	GF	GA	GD	Pts	Promotion or relegation
1	St Asaph City (C, P)	30	23	3	4	105	27	+78	72	Promotion to Division 1
2	Llangefni Town (P)	30	23	3	4	106	34	+72	72	Promotion to Division 1
3	Trearddur Bay (P)	30	22	3	5	93	39	+54	69	Promotion to Division 1
4	Nantlle Vale	30	21	4	5	101	52	+49	67	
5	Llannerch-y-medd	30	21	4	5	81	32	+49	67	
6	Mynydd Llandegai	30	12	7	11	64	66	−2	43	
7	Greenfield	30	12	6	12	75	69	+6	42	
8	Blaenau Ffestiniog Amateur	30	11	6	13	72	67	+5	39	
9	Meliden	30	10	4	16	68	71	−3	34	
10	Bethesda Athletic	30	10	2	18	72	104	−32	32	
11	Halkyn United	30	9	3	18	59	82	−23	30	
12	Amlwch Town	30	9	3	18	59	96	−37	30	
13	Mochdre Sports	30	7	3	20	43	87	−44	24	
14	Gaerwen (Note: Gaerwen were deducted three points for non fulfilment of fixture.)	30	8	2	20	54	108	−54	23	
15	Penmaenmawr Phoenix	30	6	4	20	45	107	−62	22	
16	Pentraeth	30	6	3	21	50	106	−56	21	

Source: Welsh Alliance League, NonLeagueMatters
Rules for classification: 1) Points; 2) Goal difference; 3) Goals scored; 4) Matches won; 5) Play-off.
(C) Champions; (P) Promoted

=== Results ===
Home \ Away	AML	BET	BFA	GAR	GRE	HAL	LLG	LYM	MEL	MOC	MYN	NAN	PHO	PEN	STA	TRE
Amlwch Town	—	4–2	1–7	1–1	2–1	3–2	0–9	1–2	1–1	1–2	2–0	2–3	5–3	5–0	1–2	3–3
Bethesda Athletic	2–3	—	3–1	4–3	1–2	4–1	1–8	1–3	4–3	4–2	2–2	2–4	3–0	3–4	1–7	4–9
Blaenau Ffestiniog Amateur	5–4	3–3	—	4–0	1–1	2–2	1–2	1–1	5–0	2–4	1–2	0–1	4–2	3–1	0–4	3–2
Gaerwen	1–6	1–5	4–2	—	3–6	5–2	1–3	0–4	2–3	2–0	1–2	2–3	4–3	3–5	0–8	2–3
Greenfield	5–3	2–1	0–1	13–1	—	2–2	1–3	0–3	1–1	2–2	2–2	3–3	2–3	4–1	2–1	2–4
Halkyn United	5–0	2–1	0–3	4–2	0–2	—	0–1	1–2	3–5	3–0	3–6	1–3	1–2	1–1	2–4	2–3
Llangefni Town	3–0	8–0	5–2	4–1	5–0	2–0	—	1–1	3–2	7–1	1–2	1–6	3–2	4–0	1–0	1–2
Llannerch-y-medd	1–0	3–1	4–1	3–0	3–0	5–4	2–2	—	5–1	4–2	3–2	7–1	4–0	4–1	1–1	0–1
Meliden	8–1	4–1	0–3	3–1	2–4	1–2	3–2	0–5	—	7–1	1–2	1–5	5–0	7–2	2–2	0–2
Mochdre Sports	3–2	4–5	1–1	0–2	0–4	1–4	1–5	1–0	3–2	—	1–2	1–2	1–0	4–3	0–4	0–1
Mynydd Llandegai	3–0	2–4	3–2	2–2	7–1	3–4	0–2	2–1	1–2	4–2	—	2–6	1–1	2–3	2–4	1–6
Nantlle Vale	3–0	6–3	5–1	4–1	4–2	5–1	1–3	1–2	1–0	4–1	3–3	—	10–1	5–2	1–4	2–1
Penmaenmawr Phoenix	2–5	3–2	2–2	2–3	2–4	2–3	0–7	0–3	2–2	3–1	1–2	3–3	—	3–0	1–6	0–5
Pentraeth	5–3	3–4	2–9	2–4	4–6	0–2	1–5	1–4	1–0	2–2	1–1	0–5	0–1	—	1–3	3–1
St Asaph City	7–0	5–1	2–0	6–0	1–0	6–1	1–3	3–0	4–2	3–1	1–1	1–0	7–0	5–0	—	3–1
Trearddur Bay	5–0	2–0	6–2	1–2	3–1	6–1	2–2	2–1	2–0	2–1	3–0	1–1	9–1	3–1	2–0	—

Source: Welsh Alliance League – Division 2 Results Grid, - NonLeagueMatters - Welsh Alliance League Division 2 - Results / Fixtures
Legend: Blue = home team win; Yellow = draw; Red = away team win.
