= 2013–14 Welsh Alliance League =

Welsh Alliance League
- Season: 2013–14
- Dates: 10 August 2013 – 17 May 2014
- Champions: Division 1 – Denbigh Town; Division 2 – Penrhyndeudraeth
- Matches played: 366
- Goals scored: 1,668 (4.56 per match)
- Biggest home win: Division 1 Holywell Town 9–0 Gwalchmai (21 April 2014); Division 2 Meliden 10–0 Bethesda Athletic (23 November 2013); Penrhyndeudraeth 10–0 Penmaenmawr Phoenix (5 April 2014); Penrhyndeudraeth 10–0 Bethesda Athletic (21 April 2014)
- Biggest away win: Division 1 Llandyrnog United 1–8 Holywell Town (2 November 2013); Division 2 Bethesda Athletic 0–8 Penrhyndeudraeth (22 March 2014); Greenfield 0–8 Kinmel Bay Sports (12 April 2014)
- Highest attendance: 500 – Division 1 Denbigh Town 4–1 Holywell Town (24 April 2014); 323 – Division 2 Meliden 2–0 St Asaph City (26 August 2013)
- All statistics correct as of 11 March 2019.

The 2013–14 Welsh Alliance League, known as the Lock Stock Welsh Alliance League for sponsorship reasons, is the 30th season of the Welsh Alliance League, which consists of two divisions: the third and fourth levels of the Welsh football pyramid.

There are fifteen teams in Division 1 and thirteen teams in Division 2, with the champions of Division 1 promoted to the Cymru Alliance. In Division 2, the champions, and runners-up are promoted to Division 1.

The season began on 10 August 2013 and concluded on 17 May 2014 with Denbigh Town as Division 1 champions. In Division 2, Penrhyndeudraeth were champions with Kinmel Bay Sports as runners-up.

== Division 1 ==
=== Teams ===
Caernarfon Town were champions in the previous season and were promoted to the Cymru Alliance. They were replaced by Division 2 champions, Llandyrnog United and runners-up, Llanfairpwll, who were promoted to Division 1.

Locations of the Division 1 teams of the 2013–14 Welsh Alliance League

==== Grounds and locations ====
Team	Location	Ground
Barmouth & Dyffryn United	Barmouth	Wern Mynach
Bodedern Athletic	Bodedern	Cae'r Ysgol
Denbigh Town	Denbigh	Central Park
Glan Conwy	Glan Conwy	Cae Ffwt
Glantraeth	Bodorgan	Trefdraeth
Gwalchmai	Gwalchmai	Maes Meurig
Holywell Town	Holywell	Halkyn Road
Llanberis	Llanberis	Ffordd Padarn
Llandudno Junction	Llandudno Junction	Arriva Ground
Llandyrnog United	Llandyrnog	Cae Nant
Llanfairpwll	Llanfairpwllgwyngyll	Maes Eilian
Llanrug United	Llanrug	Eithin Duon
Llanrwst United	Llanrwst	Gwydir Park
Nefyn United	Nefyn	Cae'r Delyn
Pwllheli	Pwllheli	Leisure Centre, Recreation Road

=== League table ===
Pos	Team	Pld	W	D	L	GF	GA	GD	Pts	Promotion or relegation
1	Denbigh Town (C, P)	28	25	3	0	96	18	+78	78	Promotion to Cymru Alliance
2	Holywell Town	28	20	5	3	103	23	+80	65	
3	Llanrug United	28	18	5	5	76	43	+33	59	
4	Barmouth & Dyffryn United	28	14	4	10	53	58	−5	46	
5	Glantraeth (Note: Glantraeth were deducted three points for non fulfilment of fixture.)	28	14	4	10	67	61	+6	43	
6	Llanberis	28	12	3	13	69	65	+4	39	
7	Bodedern Athletic	28	10	7	11	49	53	−4	37	
8	Gwalchmai	28	10	5	13	55	74	−19	35	
9	Glan Conwy	28	8	10	10	48	64	−16	34	
10	Llanrwst United	28	8	5	15	52	69	−17	29	
11	Nefyn United (Note: Nefyn United resigned from the Welsh Alliance League at the end of the season.)	28	9	1	18	34	73	−39	28	
12	Llandudno Junction	28	6	9	13	46	66	−20	27	
13	Pwllheli	28	7	4	17	37	69	−32	25	
14	Llanfairpwll	28	7	3	18	51	70	−19	24	
15	Llandyrnog United	28	7	2	19	37	67	−30	23	

Source: Welsh Alliance League,NonLeagueMatters
Rules for classification: 1) Points; 2) Goal difference; 3) Goals scored; 4) Matches won; 5) Play-off.
(C) Champions; (P) Promoted

=== Results ===
Home \ Away	BDU	BOD	DEN	GLC	GLA	GWA	HOL	LNB	LNJ	LLD	LPG	LRU	LRW	NEF	PWL
Barmouth & Dyffryn United	—	2–1	1–5	3–0	2–4	3–1	1–1	3–2	0–0	2–1	2–1	1–1	3–1	2–0	2–1
Bodedern Athletic	4–4	—	0–2	1–4	3–0	2–2	3–7	2–3	5–1	0–0	0–2	1–1	2–1	3–0	3–2
Denbigh Town	4–0	1–0	—	4–1	2–1	5–0	4–1	4–1	3–0	3–0	4–3	3–3	7–0	3–0	2–0
Glan Conwy	3–2	3–2	0–5	—	2–2	1–1	0–5	2–2	0–3	4–3	2–2	1–3	3–2	1–1	3–1
Glantraeth	1–2	3–0	1–2	2–2	—	4–1	2–6	2–1	2–2	3–0	6–3	3–2	5–1	4–2	2–1
Gwalchmai	3–2	0–3	3–3	1–0	0–2	—	2–2	5–1	3–2	3–5	4–1	2–5	2–3	3–2	3–0
Holywell Town	4–0	7–0	0–0	5–1	1–0	9–0	—	3–2	5–1	4–0	3–0	0–2	2–1	8–0	6–0
Llanberis	6–2	2–4	1–4	1–1	7–3	3–4	2–0	—	1–1	3–2	4–2	1–2	2–1	6–3	3–1
Llandudno Junction	0–4	1–1	0–2	2–2	3–3	3–3	0–5	4–1	—	1–2	2–5	4–1	2–1	2–3	3–3
Llandyrnog United	1–2	2–1	1–4	2–3	0–1	1–3	1–8	0–3	3–0	—	3–0	1–2	0–4	2–0	1–1
Llanfairpwll	5–1	1–2	1–2	2–2	0–1	1–3	0–1	1–3	3–1	3–0	—	1–3	1–4	1–3	4–0
Llanrug United	3–0	1–1	0–4	3–2	6–1	2–0	0–0	3–1	3–1	4–2	7–2	—	3–4	3–1	5–1
Llanrwst United	2–4	0–0	0–5	2–2	2–4	4–1	1–1	2–1	2–2	1–2	4–2	2–6	—	3–0	1–3
Nefyn United	1–0	0–1	0–4	1–3	3–1	2–1	0–7	1–4	0–3	3–2	2–3	3–0	1–0	—	0–2
Pwllheli	2–3	1–4	0–5	1–0	5–4	3–1	0–2	3–2	0–2	1–0	1–1	0–2	3–3	1–2	—

Source: Welsh Alliance League – Division 1 Results Grid, - NonLeagueMatters - Welsh Alliance League Division 1 - Results / Fixtures
Legend: Blue = home team win; Yellow = draw; Red = away team win.

== Division 2 ==
=== Teams ===
Llandyrnog United were champions in the previous season and were promoted to Division 1 along with runners-up, Llanfairpwll. They were replaced by Gwynedd League champions, Trearddur Bay and Vale of Clwyd and Conwy Football League champions, St Asaph City who were promoted to Division 2. In addition Bethesda Athletic rejoined the Welsh Alliance League.

Locations of the Division 2 teams of the 2013–14 Welsh Alliance League

==== Grounds and locations ====
Team	Location	Ground
Amlwch Town	Amlwch	Lôn Bach
Bethesda Athletic	Bethesda	Parc Meurig
Blaenau Ffestiniog Amateur	Blaenau Ffestiniog	Cae Clyd
Gaerwen	Gaerwen	Lôn Groes
Greenfield	Greenfield	Bagillt Road
Halkyn United	Halkyn	Pant Newydd
Kinmel Bay Sports	Kinmel Bay	Y Morfa
Meliden	Meliden	Ffordd Tŷ Newydd
Nantlle Vale	Penygroes	Maes Dulyn
Penmaenmawr Phoenix	Penmaenmawr	Cae Sling
Penrhyndeudraeth	Penrhyndeudraeth	Maes Y Parc
St Asaph City	St Asaph	Roe Plas
Trearddur Bay	Trearddur Bay	Lon Isallt

=== League table ===
Pos	Team	Pld	W	D	L	GF	GA	GD	Pts	Promotion or relegation
1	Penrhyndeudraeth (C, P)	24	22	1	1	114	23	+91	67	Promotion to Division 1
2	Kinmel Bay Sports (P)	24	16	5	3	92	38	+54	53	Promotion to Division 1
3	Trearddur Bay	24	15	4	5	79	37	+42	49	
4	St Asaph City (Note: St Asaph City were deducted three points for playing ineligible player.)	24	15	4	5	77	33	+44	46	
5	Nantlle Vale	24	13	3	8	69	48	+21	42	
6	Halkyn United	24	12	2	10	67	57	+10	38	
7	Meliden	24	11	2	11	60	55	+5	35	
8	Greenfield	24	9	4	11	51	57	−6	31	
9	Penmaenmawr Phoenix	24	9	2	13	54	68	−14	29	
10	Blaenau Ffestiniog Amateur	24	7	1	16	61	95	−34	22	
11	Amlwch Town	24	6	2	16	31	72	−41	20	
12	Gaerwen	24	3	1	20	24	87	−63	10	
13	Bethesda Athletic	24	1	3	20	16	125	−109	6	

Source: Welsh Alliance League,NonLeagueMatters
Rules for classification: 1) Points; 2) Goal difference; 3) Goals scored; 4) Matches won; 5) Play-off.
(C) Champions; (P) Promoted

=== Results ===
Home \ Away	AML	BET	BFA	GAR	GRE	HAL	KIN	MEL	NAN	PHO	PEN	STA	TRE
Amlwch Town	—	4–0	3–2	2–0	1–0	1–0	2–9	2–4	0–2	1–3	2–3	1–5	0–5
Bethesda Athletic	1–3	—	1–1	3–2	1–2	0–5	1–7	1–6	0–7	0–0	0–8	0–5	2–8
Blaenau Ffestiniog Amateur	9–4	5–2	—	5–1	1–3	0–3	3–4	3–2	1–5	4–3	1–4	3–5	0–6
Gaerwen	2–1	1–1	4–3	—	1–0	0–4	0–1	0–1	1–3	1–2	0–5	2–3	0–4
Greenfield	2–0	4–1	2–5	7–0	—	3–0	0–8	3–2	3–3	1–1	0–3	0–2	2–2
Halkyn United	2–1	7–0	8–4	5–3	2–2	—	0–2	3–1	5–0	5–3	1–4	1–1	5–1
Kinmel Bay Sports	1–1	2–0	8–0	6–2	6–1	5–0	—	3–1	5–4	6–2	1–3	6–2	1–2
Meliden	1–0	10–0	2–3	3–1	4–3	2–4	3–3	—	3–0	3–1	1–5	2–0	5–1
Nantlle Vale	1–1	9–0	2–0	3–0	4–6	4–1	2–2	4–1	—	4–0	0–3	4–1	1–3
Penmaenmawr Phoenix	3–0	5–2	7–1	4–3	2–4	4–2	2–3	7–2	1–2	—	0–1	1–0	2–6
Penrhyndeudraeth	8–0	10–0	5–2	9–0	3–1	10–1	4–0	2–0	5–2	10–0	—	4–3	2–2
St Asaph City	7–0	5–0	6–2	7–0	2–0	2–1	2–2	1–1	5–0	4–0	6–2	—	2–0
Trearddur Bay	2–1	9–0	5–3	5–0	3–2	4–2	1–1	5–0	1–3	3–1	0–1	1–1	—

Source: Welsh Alliance League – Division 2 Results Grid, - NonLeagueMatters - Welsh Alliance League Division 2 - Results / Fixtures
Legend: Blue = home team win; Yellow = draw; Red = away team win.
