= 1913–14 Welsh Amateur Cup =

1913-14 Welsh Amateur Cup
Tournament details
- Country: Wales

Final positions
- Champions: Cardiff Corinthians
- Runners-up: Holywell

The 1913–14 Welsh Amateur Cup was the 24th season of the Welsh Amateur Cup. The cup was won by Cardiff Corinthians who defeated Holywell 1–0 in the final at Newtown, and in doing so became the first team from South Wales to win the Cup.

== Preliminary round ==
Home	Result	Away
University College	9-2	Dolgarrog
Holyhead Swifts	1-0	Llandudno Junction
Caernarfon United	3-1	Llanrwst
Brymbo Institute	5-1	Wrexham GCR Locos
Druids	2-2	Rhos
Druids	0-6 (rep)	Rhos
Towyn	2-1	Barmouth
Cross Keys Town	1-1	Dowlais
Cross Keys Town	2-1 (rep)	Dowlais
Mond Nickel Works	3-2	Caerau
Bargoed	2-1	Cardiff Amateurs

== First round ==
Home	Result	Away
Holyhead Swifts	2-0	University College
Caernarfon United	2-1	Llandudno
Colwyn Bay	4-3	Rhyl
Brymbo	1-0	Caergwrle Castle
Summerhill	2-1	Southsea United
Rhos	2-1	Esclusham
Rhos Church	3-0	Chirk
Bala	3-1	Towyn
Pwllheli	2-0	Machynlleth
Llandrindod Wells	7-1	Builth Wells
Newtown	3-2	Rhayader
Ynysddu	1-0	Bargoed
Mond Nickel Works	4-0 (w/d)	Cross Keys Town

== Second round ==
Home team	Result	Away team
Holyhead Swifts	4-0	Caernarfon United
Colwyn Bay	2-1	Denbigh
Rhos	5-1	Rhos Church
Pant Blue Stars	4-1	Llanfyllin
Llandrindod Wells	1-0	Newtown
Ynysddu	4-1	Cross Keys Town
Brymbo	Aban	Summerhill
Pwllheli	1-1	Bala Press

== Third round ==
Home team	Result	Away team
Colwyn Bay	0-2	Holywell United
Bangor Reserves	6-0	Holyhead Swifts
Llanidloes United	1-1	Pant
Llanidloes United	3-1 (rep)	Pant
Cardiff Corinthians	4-0	Llandrindod Wells
Ynysddu	3-0	Aberaman
Rhos	1-1	Gwersyllt
Rhos	0-2 (aban)	Gwersyllt
Rhos	1-3 (rep)	Gwersyllt
Johnstown Amateurs	2-0	Brymbo
Bala Press	4-0	Aberystwyth

== Fourth round ==
Home team	Result	Away team
Cardiff Corinthians	3-1	Ynysddu
Holywell United	3-1	Bangor Reserves
Johnstown Amateurs	1-1	Gwersyllt
Johnstown Amateurs	2-0 (rep)	Gwersyllt
Llanidloes United	6-0	Bala Press

== Semi-final ==
	Result		Venue
Cardiff Corinthians	3-2	Llanidloes United	Llandrindod Wells
Cardiff Corinthians	3-0 (Replay)	Llanidloes United	Wrexham
Holywell United	2-1	Johnstown Amateurs	(England) Chester

== Final ==
Winner	Result	Runner-up	Venue
Cardiff Corinthians	1-0	Holywell United	Newtown
