= 2021–22 Cymru North =

Cymru North
- Season: 2021–22
- Champions: Airbus UK Broughton
- Promoted: Airbus UK Broughton
- Relegated: Bangor City (resigned); Llanrhaeadr; Llangefni Town
- Matches: 210
- Goals: 700 (3.33 per match)
- Top goalscorer: Adam Davies, Airbus UK Broughton (30 goals)
- Biggest home win: Gresford Athletic 7–0 Prestatyn Town (18 December 2021)
- Biggest away win: Llangefni Town 0–6 Prestatyn Town (2 October 2021)
- Highest scoring: Airbus UK 7–2 Prestatyn Town (23 October 2021)
- Longest winning run: Airbus UK Broughton - 12 games, 24 July-19 November 2021
- Longest unbeaten run: Airbus UK Broughton - 16 games, 24 July 2021-22 January 2022; Guilsfield - 16 games, 24 July 2021-29 January 2022
- Longest winless run: Llanrhaeadr - 15 games, 24 July-4 December 2021
- Longest losing run: Llanrhaeadr - 8 games, 26 February-end of season
- Highest attendance: 1,020 - Colwyn Bay vs Llandudno (2 October 2021)

The 2021–22 Cymru North season (also known as the 2021–22 JD Cymru North season for sponsorship reasons) was the second season of the second-tier northern region football in Welsh football pyramid. Teams were to play each other twice on a home and away basis.

== Teams ==
The National League consisted of 16 clubs at the commencement of the season.

=== Team changes ===
==== To Cymru North ====
Promoted from Mid Wales Football League Division 1

- Llanidloes Town

Promoted from Welsh Alliance League Division 1

- Holyhead Hotspur

Promoted from Welsh National League Division 1

- Holywell Town

Relegated from Cymru Premier

- Airbus UK Broughton

==== From Cymru North ====
Promoted to Cymru Premier

- Flint Town United

Relegated to Ardal NE

- Corwen
- Llanfair United

Relegated to Ardal NW

- Porthmadog

=== Stadia and locations ===
Locations of teams in the 2021–22 Cymru North

Team	Home City	Home Ground	Capacity
Airbus UK Broughton	Broughton	The Hollingsworth Group Stadium	2,100
Bangor City	Bangor	Nantporth	3,000
Buckley Town	Buckley	The Globe	1,000
Colwyn Bay	Old Colwyn	4 Crosses Construction Arena	2,509
Conwy Borough	Conwy	Y Morfa Stadium	2,500
Gresford Athletic	Gresford	Clappers Lane	2,000^{[Note 1]}
Guilsfield	Guilsfield	Community Centre Ground	1,100
Holyhead Hotspur	Holyhead	The New Oval	2,000
Holywell Town	Holywell	Halkyn Road	2,000
Llandudno	Llandudno	OPS Wind Arena	1,013
Llangefni Town	Llangefni	Cae Bob Parry	3,000
Llanidloes Town	Llanidloes	Victoria Park	4,000
Llanrhaeadr	Llanrhaeadr-ym-Mochnant	The Recreation Field	1,000
Penrhyncoch	Penrhyn-coch	Cae Baker	800
Prestatyn Town	Prestatyn	Bastion Road	2,500
Ruthin Town	Ruthin	Memorial Playing Fields	2,000

Due to COVID restrictions, Gresford Athletic were unable to play at their regular Clappers Lane ground at the beginning of the 2021–22 season. They shared grounds with Airbus UK Broughton at The Hollingsworth Group Stadium until September 2021, before moving to Cefn Druids' The Rock. They returned to Clappers Lane at the end of October.

=== Bangor City ===
On 18 February 2022 Bangor City announced in an official statement to inform the Football Association of Wales that they had withdrawn from the Cymru North for the remainder of the 2021–22 season. Later that day, the FAW confirmed that the club's withdrawal had been accepted and its playing record in the league for the season had been expunged. The club had been suspended from all football activity by the FAW since 30 November 2021 for non-payment of player and staff wages and had faced expulsion from the league by the FAW if it had not paid outstanding monies by 19 February.

=== Personnel and kits ===
Team	Manager	Captain	Kit manufacturer	Shirt sponsor (chest)
Airbus UK Broughton	(Wales) Steve O'Shaughnessy	(England) Steve Tomassen	Umbro	Gardner Aerospace
Bangor City	(England) Mathurin Ovambe	(Wales) Scott van-der-Sluis	Nike	Sudaires
Buckley Town	(Wales) Dan Moore	(Wales) Joe Makaruk	TAG Sportswear	Thomas Roofing
Colwyn Bay	(Wales) Steve Evans	(England) Tom McCready	Kappa	GO2 People
Conwy Borough	(England) Stu Howson	(Wales) Iolo Hughes	SKkits	Mel Owen Electrical Solutions
Gresford	(Wales) Eddie Maurice-Jones	(Wales) Joshua Griffiths	Joma	Eurogold
Guilsfield	(England) Nathan Leonard	(Wales) Sam Litchfield	Macron	Hardings Garden Centre
Holyhead Hotspur	(Wales) Darren Garmey	(Wales) Alex Jones	Joma	Land&Lakes
Holywell Town	(England) Johnny Haseldin	(England) James Graham	Joma	The Feathers Inn
Llandudno	(Wales) Sean Eardley	(Wales) Danny Hughes	Umbro	Offshore Painting Services
Llangefni Town	(Wales) Chris Roberts	(Wales) James Saxon	Nike	"Diolch NHS"
Llanidloes Town	(Wales) Chris Davies	(Wales) Drew Reynolds	Acerbis	Potter Group
Llanrhaeadr	(Wales) Marc Griffiths	(Wales) Joe Vaughan	Macron	Huw E Watkin Building Contractors
Penrhyncoch	(Wales) Aneurin Thomas	(Wales) Owain James	Joma	Sterling Asset Management
Prestatyn Town	(England) John Barnes	(England) Richard Cowderoy	Ibanes	EcoUpgrade
Ruthin Town	(England) Phil Hudson	(Wales) Osian Davies	Adidas	Dragon Drilling

=== Managerial changes ===
Team	Outgoing manager	Manner of departure	Date of vacancy	Position in the table	Incoming manager	Date of appointment
Bangor City	(Argentina) Hugo Colace	Sacked	27 October 2021	6th	(England) Maturin Ovambe	11 October 2021
Prestatyn Town	(Republic of Ireland) Ben Heath	Resigned	14 December 2021	11th	(Wales) Andrew Ruscoe	15 December 2021
Colwyn Bay	(England) Craig Hogg	Sacked	28 December 2021	6th	(Wales) Steve Evans	9 January 2022
Conwy Borough	(Wales) Matty Jones	Mutual consent	8 March 2022	10th	(England) Stu Howson	9 March 2022
Prestatyn Town	(Wales) Andrew Ruscoe	Resigned	3 April 2022	13th	(England) John Barnes	3 April 2022

== League table ==
Pos	Team	Pld	W	D	L	GF	GA	GD	Pts	Promotion or relegation
1	Airbus UK Broughton (C, P)	28	23	3	2	85	23	+62	72	Promotion to Cymru Premier
2	Llandudno	28	20	3	5	55	21	+34	63	
3	Guilsfield	28	14	10	4	51	24	+27	52	
4	Holywell Town	28	15	5	8	68	36	+32	50	
5	Ruthin Town	28	15	4	9	51	34	+17	49	
6	Colwyn Bay	28	15	3	10	60	40	+20	48	
7	Holyhead Hotspur	28	11	8	9	41	34	+7	41	
8	Buckley Town	28	11	7	10	48	48	0	40	
9	Penrhyncoch	28	9	8	11	39	57	−18	35	
10	Conwy Borough	28	8	8	12	42	59	−17	32	
11	Gresford Athletic	28	8	7	13	39	42	−3	31	
12	Llanidloes Town	28	7	7	14	44	59	−15	28	
13	Prestatyn Town	28	5	5	18	34	68	−34	20	
14	Llangefni Town (R)	28	3	6	19	19	70	−51	15	Relegation to Ardal NE or Ardal NW
15	Llanrhaeadr (R)	28	2	4	22	23	84	−61	10	Relegation to Ardal NE or Ardal NW
16	Bangor City (D, R)	0	0	0	0	0	0	0	0 (Note: The match between Buckley and Bangor on 4 December 2021 was postponed after Bangor were suspended due to failing to pay their players wages. As a result of the postponement, Bangor were initially deducted 3 points and fined £1,000. The following week, Bangor failed to fulfill their fixture against Prestatyn for the same reason, and were deducted a further 3 points, and again for the fixture against Airbus on 17 December. Following their withdrawal from the league, Bangor's results were expunged.)	Resigned from the league, club folded years later

Source: Cymru North League Table
Rules for classification: 1) Points; 2) Goal difference; 3) Goals scored; 4) Matches won; 5) Play-off.
(C) Champions; (D) Disqualified; (P) Promoted; (R) Relegated

== Results ==
Home \ Away	AIR	BUC	COL	CON	GRE	GUI	HDH	HWL	LND	LGT	LID	LRH	PRC	PRE	RUT
Airbus UK Broughton	—	2–0	4–1	3–1	4–2	2–2	1–0	6–1	1–0	5–0	3–0	5–1	6–0	7–2	2–1
Buckley Town	1–3	—	1–0	1–4	2–1	1–1	2–2	3–3	1–2	1–1	2–1	4–2	2–3	1–1	5–0
Colwyn Bay	0–3	3–1	—	1–2	2–1	3–1	4–3	0–3	1–2	0–0	3–2	5–0	5–1	3–2	0–1
Conwy Borough	1–4	3–3	1–1	—	0–0	1–3	0–0	1–4	0–4	1–0	1–3	3–2	2–2	2–1	1–3
Gresford Athletic	0–1	2–0	0–3	2–2	—	0–2	0–0	0–0	2–0	3–0	2–2	4–0	4–2	7–0	1–0
Guilsfield	0–0	1–1	1–0	2–1	0–0	—	3–0	1–2	3–0	1–1	3–0	4–0	2–2	6–1	1–1
Holyhead Hotspur	1–2	1–2	0–0	2–0	5–0	1–1	—	1–0	1–1	2–0	2–1	2–1	1–1	4–0	0–1
Holywell Town	3–2	2–3	0–1	2–3	4–0	3–0	1–2	—	1–2	5–1	2–2	5–0	5–0	4–1	1–1
Llandudno	0–2	3–0	3–0	2–0	1–0	0–0	2–0	0–2	—	6–1	3–0	1–0	4–0	3–0	1–0
Llangefni Town	0–3	2–3	1–3	0–3	2–1	0–3	0–5	0–3	1–3	—	2–0	1–2	1–5	0–6	1–1
Llanidloes Town	2–6	2–3	1–6	4–3	3–1	0–1	1–1	1–1	1–4	3–2	—	0–0	2–2	4–0	2–0
Llanrhaeadr	1–4	0–3	2–6	2–3	3–3	0–2	0–3	0–4	1–3	0–0	1–6	—	0–3	3–2	1–2
Penrhyncoch	1–1	1–0	0–4	1–1	2–1	3–0	0–1	1–3	2–3	2–1	2–0	0–0	—	0–2	1–1
Prestatyn Town	0–2	0–2	0–0	1–1	1–2	0–2	5–1	2–1	1–1	0–0	1–1	3–1	0–1	—	0–3
Ruthin Town	2–1	2–0	4–2	6–1	1–0	1–5	5–0	2–3	0–1	0–1	2–0	3–0	5–1	3–2	—

Updated to match(es) played on 12 March. Source: Cymru North Match Results
Legend: Blue = home team win; Yellow = draw; Red = away team win.

== Season statistics ==
=== Top scorers ===
Rank	Player	Club	Goals
1	(Wales) Adam Davies	Airbus UK Broughton	30
2	(England) James Kirby	Colwyn Bay	21
3	(England) Connor Bird	Llanidloes Town	16
4	(Wales) Joe Chaplin	Gresford Athletic	15
5	(England) Jamie Cumming	Ruthin Town	14
5	(England) Daniel Andrews	Holywell Town	14
5	(England) Matthew Hill	Ruthin Town	14

These totals are excluding goals scored against Bangor City, after their fixtures were declared null and void

=== Monthly awards ===
Month	Manager of the Month		Player of the Month	
Month	Manager	Club	Player	Club
August	Dan Moore	Buckley Town	Adam Davies	Airbus UK Broughton
September	Sean Eardley	Llandudno	Adam Davies	Airbus UK Broughton
October	Sean Eardley	Llandudno	Gareth Evans	Llandudno
November	John Haseldin	Holywell Town	Liam Morris	Holyhead Hotspur
December	Phil Hudson	Ruthin Town	Joe Chaplin	Gresford Athletic
January	Johnny Haseldin	Holywell Town	James Kirby	Colwyn Bay
February	Sean Eardley	Llandudno	James Kirby	Colwyn Bay
March	Darren Garmey	Holyhead Hotspur	Marc Williams	Llandudno

=== Fair Play award ===
The winner for each respective division's FAW Fair Play Table was to be given £1,000 prize money and the FAW Fair Play Trophy.

The winners of the Nationwide Building Society Fair Play Award for the 2021-2022 Cymru North season are Ruthin Town
