= Caernarfon & District League =

- Founded: 1950
- Folded: 2014
- Country: Wales
- Number of clubs: 10
- Level on pyramid: 5
- Promotion to: Gwynedd League
- Last champions: Y Felinheli (2013–14)
- Most championships: Llanberis Athletic (9 titles)

The Caernarfon & District League was a football league covering the Caernarfon and surrounding areas in North Wales.

== League history ==
The league was a renamed version of the Bangor & District League that had run between 1930 and 1937 and again after the Second World War, between 1945 and 1950. The change in name reflected the changing geographical locations of clubs in the league.

The first season of the league was 1950–51 and featured the following eight sides:

- Abersoch Athletic
- Caernarfon YMCA
- Cesarea Rovers
- Mountain Rangers
- Nefyn United
- Seiont Rovers
- Talysarn Celts
- Waenfawr

The 1950–51 launch was overshadowed by the formation of a second division to the north's top League, the Welsh League (North). Because of this, the league did not operate in 1951–52, but it restarted for the following season with a membership of seven. This number grew to thirteen by the mid-1950s, and the league prospered, compared to the past. membership reduced during the early 1960s but this was reversed, and by the 1980s the league was well established as one of North Wales' top junior leagues. Many clubs in the area used the league for their reserve teams, especially during the 1980s after the Gwynedd League was launched as an intermediate step between the League and the Welsh League (North).

Hit by falling team numbers, the league disbanded after the 2013–14 season.

== Clubs in the final 2013–14 season ==
The following teams featured in the league in the final season played.

- Barmouth & Dyffryn United reserves
- Blaenau Ffestiniog Amateur reserves
- Caernarfon Borough (resigned from the league)
- Harlech Town
- Llanberis reserves
- Llanrug United reserves
- Nefyn United reserves
- Pwllheli reserves (resigned from the league)
- Talysarn Celts
- Y Felinheli

== League Champions ==
=== 1950s ===
- 1950–51: – Cesarea Rovers
- 1951–52: – No league in operation
- 1952–53: – Nefyn United
- 1953–54: – Nefyn United
- 1954–55: – Nefyn United
- 1955–56: – Criccieth Town
- 1956–57: – Bangor Athletic
- 1957–58: – Penrhos United
- 1958–59: – Penrhos United
- 1959–60: – Penrhos United

=== 1960s ===
- 1960–61: – Carmel Locals
- 1961–62: – Llanberis Athletic
- 1962–63: – Llanberis Athletic
- 1963–64: – Llanberis Athletic
- 1964–65: – Llechid Celts
- 1965–66: – Llanberis Athletic
- 1966–67: – Llechid Celts
- 1967–68: – Llanberis Athletic
- 1968–69: – Llanberis Athletic
- 1969–60: – Mountain Rangers

=== 1970s ===
- 1970–71: – Llanberis Athletic
- 1971–72: – Llanrug United
- 1972–73: – Coleg Normal Bangor
- 1973–74: – Talysarn Celts
- 1974–75: – Mountain Rangers
- 1975–76: – Mountain Rangers
- 1976–77: – Pwllheli & District reserves
- 1977–78: – Llanrug United
- 1978–79: – Llanrug United
- 1979–80: – Llanberis Athletic

=== 1980s ===
- 1980–81: – Llanberis Athletic
- 1981–82: – Y Felinheli
- 1982–83: – Y Felinheli
- 1983–84: – Pwllheli & District reserves
- 1984–85: – CPD Penrhyndeudraeth
- 1985–86: – CPD Penrhyndeudraeth
- 1986–87: – Nefyn United
- 1987–88: – Bontnewydd
- 1988–89: – Llanrug United reserves
- 1989–90: – Locomotive Llanberis reserves

=== 1990s ===
- 1990–91: – Penrhos United
- 1991–92: – Bangor Waterloo
- 1992–93: – Caernarfon Athletic
- 1993–94: – Caernarfon Borough
- 1994–95: – CPD Deiniolen
- 1995–96: – Coleg Normal Bangor
- 1996–97: – Coleg Normal Bangor
- 1997–98: – Bethesda Athletic
- 1998–99: – Caernarfon Town reserves
- 1999–2000: – Nefyn United

=== 2000s ===
- 2000–01: – Nantlle Vale
- 2001–02: – CPD Porthmadog reserves
- 2002–03: – Barmouth & Dyffryn United
- 2003–04: – CPD Bethel
- 2004–05: – Bontnewydd
- 2005–06: – Llanllyfni
- 2006–07: – Llanystumdwy
- 2007–08: – Rhiwlas
- 2008–09: – Caernarfon Wanderers
- 2009–10: – Bangor City reserves

=== 2010s ===
- 2010–11: – Llanllyfni
- 2011–12: – CPD Waunfawr
- 2012–13: – Mynydd Llandegai
- 2013–14: – Y Felinheli

==== Number of titles by club ====
9 titles

- Llanberis Athletic

5 titles

- Nefyn United

4 titles

- Llanrug United
- Penrhos United

3 titles

- Coleg Normal Bangor
- Y Felinheli
- Mountain Rangers

2 titles

- Bethesda Athletic
- Bontnewydd
- Llechid Celts
- Llanllyfni
- Penrhyndeudraeth
- Pwllheli & District reserves

1 title

- Bangor Athletic
- Bangor City reserves
- Bangor Waterloo
- Barmouth & Dyffryn United
- Bethel
- Caernarfon Athletic
- Caernarfon Borough
- Caernarfon Town reserves
- Caernarfon Wanderers
- Carmel Locals
- Cesarea Rovers
- Criccieth Town
- Deiniolen
- Llanystumdwy
- Mynydd Llandegai
- Nantlle Vale
- Porthmadog reserves
- Rhiwlas
- Talysarn Celts
- Waunfawr
