= C.P.D. Y Felinheli =

Association football club in Wales

Coordinates: 53°11′27″N 4°11′43″W

CPD Y Felinheli
- Full name: Clwb Pêl Droed Y Felinheli
- Nickname: Felinheli
- Founded: 1977 (as Portdinorwic Football Club)
- Ground: Cae Seilo
- Capacity: 111 Seats
- Chairman: Alwyn Thomas
- Manager: Trystan Dafydd, Islwyn Owen, Martin Jones
- League: Ardal NW League
- 2025–26: Ardal NW League, 13th of 16
- Website: http://cpd-y-felinheli.cymru/eng/

Clwb Pêl-droed Y Felinheli (Welsh for 'Y Felinheli football club') is a Welsh football team based in the village of Y Felinheli (formerly known in English as Port Dinorwic), Gwynedd, Wales. They play in the Ardal NW League.

== History ==
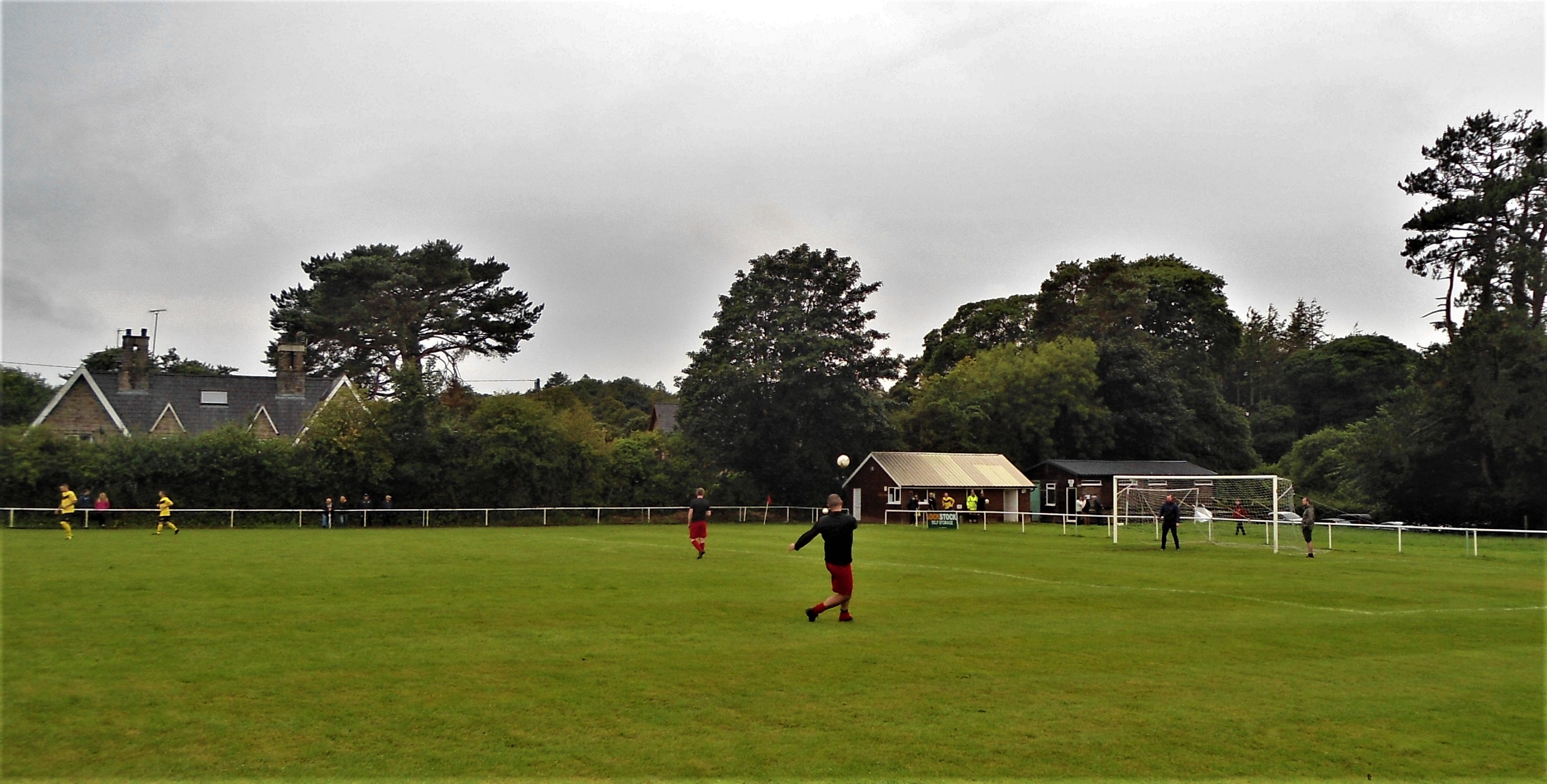
Cae Seilo, home ground of C.P.D. Y Felinheli

The current club was founded on 3 July 1977 as Portdinorwic Football Club, but there is evidence of teams in the village in 1890s, 1920s and 1930s. A club called Port Dinorwic won the Caernarfon & District League's Alves Cup in 1945–46. A team called Portdinorwic Football Club also played in the Caernarfon & District League for two seasons in the 1960s and used the same ground as the current club.

On 14 October 2023, Y Felinheli played in the second round of the Welsh Cup, losing 6–0 to Newtown.

== Honours ==
- Welsh Alliance League – Runners-up: 1991–92
- Welsh Alliance League Division Two – Champions: 2019–20
- Gwynedd League – Champions: 1983–84; 2000–01; 2015–16
- Caernarfon & District League – Champions: 1981–82; 1982–83; 2013–14
- North Wales Coast Challenge Cup – Winners: 1987–88
- North Wales Coast Challenge Cup – Runners-up: 1988–89; 1989–90
- Caernarfon & District League Alves Cup – Winners: 1991–92
- North Wales Coast FA Junior Challenge Cup – Winners: 2012–13; 2013–14
- Llun Mewn Ffram – Winners: 2013–14
- Gwynedd League Cup – Winners: 2015–16
