= Cardiff Corinthians F.C. =

Association football club in Wales

Coordinates: 51°30′54.2″N 3°14′42.8″W

Cardiff Corinthians
- Full name: Cardiff Corinthians Football Club
- Nicknames: The Corries, Alpha, The Cards
- Founded: 1897; 129 years ago
- Ground: The Riverside Ground; Station Road; Radyr
- Chairman: Howie Smith
- Manager: Grant Thompson
- League: Ardal SW League
- 2025–26: Ardal SW League, 11h of 16
- Website: www.cardiffcorinthians.com
Home colours	Away colours

Cardiff Corinthians F.C. are a football club from Cardiff, Wales. The club plays in the Ardal SW League.

== History ==
The club was formed in 1898 when players from the Alpha Cricket Club decided to form a football team to keep in touch during the winter months. With their base at Sophia Gardens, Cardiff, for the first six years, the team only played friendlies but then joined the Rhymney Valley League. It was in cup competitions that the team made its mark, and in 1914 they won the Welsh Amateur Cup, beating Holywell Town F.C. 1–0 at Newtown. They have several nicknames, including The Corries, Alpha, or The Cards (shortened version of [Cardiff].

On 5 June 1910, they became the first ever British club to play FC Barcelona, losing 4–1. They then played RCD Espanyol three days later, losing 4–2.

After the war, the club moved to Pengam Farm. Tremorfa in 1921 took the bold step of joining the professional Western Football League, but because travel expenses were so high in 1924, the club opted to join the Welsh Football League. In 1921, the club played a series of friendly matches against FC Barcelona, losing 4–0, 2–1, and 2–1.

The outbreak of the Second World War interrupted Welsh League football, but the Corries continued to play friendlies using several grounds. They finally settled at Llandaff Road, Canton, Cardiff, a ground which became a permanent home thanks to a loan from former player and patron, Fred Dewey.

In the sixties and seventies, the team went up and down the divisions, although in the late seventies, they finished as Runners Up in the Premier Division and repeated the feat in 1982. More glory came when, in 1985, the club won the Premier Division and the Welsh Intermediate Cup.

In the late sixties, the club made a frantic quest for another permanent home as the ground at Canton was lost when the club defaulted on the original loan. For one season, the team played on an unenclosed pitch at Pontcanna, followed by a season at Maindy Stadium and a couple at Fidlas Avenue in Llanishen. In 1974, the club negotiated a ground share with Radyr Cricket Club, and this has been their permanent home since.

The club were relegated at the end of the 2013–14 season.

The club had a long-standing rivalry with fellow Cardiff side Cardiff Grange Harlequins A.F.C., which dates back to the 1980s when both clubs were fierce cross-city rivals and took part in some mouth-watering fixtures. Both clubs are rarely in the same division, so the long-standing rivalry has not continued over recent seasons. The 2014–15 season saw both teams in the same division, so the rivalries were resumed; however, Grange Harlequins sadly folded as a result of player exodus when funds dried up. As one of Wales's oldest clubs, Corinthians are now in the Welsh fourth tier of football and have ambitions of regaining their place in the higher echelons and have staked a large expense on player recruitment in their attempt to gain promotion.

In the 2022–23 season, The Corries led by Grant Thompson, finally reentered Ardal Southern League (Welsh league) after their season, only losing 2 games all season. Season 24/25 saw the Corries win the Ardal League Cup beating Chepstow Town in the final 5-2

== Honours ==
- Welsh Amateur Cup
  - Winners: 1914, 1929, 1930, 1934, 1962
- South Wales Football Association Amateur Cup
  - Winners: 1922–23
- South Wales Alliance League
  - Premier Division Champions: 2022–23
- South Wales Amateur League
  - Division One Champions: 1924–25
  - Division Two Champions: 1970–71
- Welsh Youth Cup
  - Winners: 1955, 1974
- Welsh League
  - Premier Division Champions: 1984–85
  - Division One Champions: 1970–71, 1977–78
  - Division Two East Champions: 1955–56, 1959–60
  - SA Brains Challenge Cup Winners: 1976
- Corinthian Cup
  - Winners: 1973
- Welsh Intermediate Cup
  - Winners: 1985
- W John Owen Cup
  - Winners: 2021–22
- Ardal Southern Cup
  - Winners: 2024–25
