= Penrhyndeudraeth F.C. =

Association football club in Wales

Coordinates: 52.929812°N 4.066301°W

- Full name: Clwb Pêl-Droed Penrhyndeudraeth; Penrhyndeudraeth Football Club
- Nickname(s): Penrhyn / Cockles / Cockle Town
- Founded: 1981
- Ground: Maes Y Parc, Penrhyndeudraeth
- Chairman: (Wales) Desmond Jones
- Manager: (Wales) Steffan Jones
- League: North Wales Coast West Premier Division
- 2024–25: North Wales Coast West Premier Division, 7th of 16
- Website: https://www.pitchero.com/clubs/cpdpenrhyndeudraeth
Home colours	Away colours

Penrhyndeudraeth Football Club (Welsh: Clwb Pêl-Droed Penrhyndeudraeth, also abbreviated Penrhyn) is a football team, playing in the North Wales Coast West Premier Division. The club was re-formed in 1981 and plays their home fixtures at Maes Y Parc, Penrhyndeudraeth.

== History ==
Clwb Pêl-Droed Penrhyndeudraeth / Penrhyndeudraeth Football Club

Although football is believed to have been played in Penrhyndeudraeth as far back as the 1900s, and then by a team known as Penrhyndeudraeth Rovers in the 1910s, there are no real records for that period. Competitive football in Penrhyndeudraeth can, however, be traced back to the 1930s, with the team of the village's Cooke's Explosive Works team, Cooke's United FC, being involved in the Lleyn & District League during the 1937–38 and 1938–39 seasons, then in the Lleyn Peninsula League after the 2nd World War during the 1946–47 and 1947–48 seasons. For the 1948–49 season they joined the Welsh League (North) and were involved in that League until 1950–51. The team then joined the Cambrian Coast League for the 1951–52 season, and records show their involvement, with limited success, until the end of the 1957–58 season.

A new club, Penrhyndeudraeth United, was then formed and joined the Caernarfon & District League at the start of the 1966–67 season, but folded, after 3 unsuccessful seasons, at the end of the 1968–69 season.

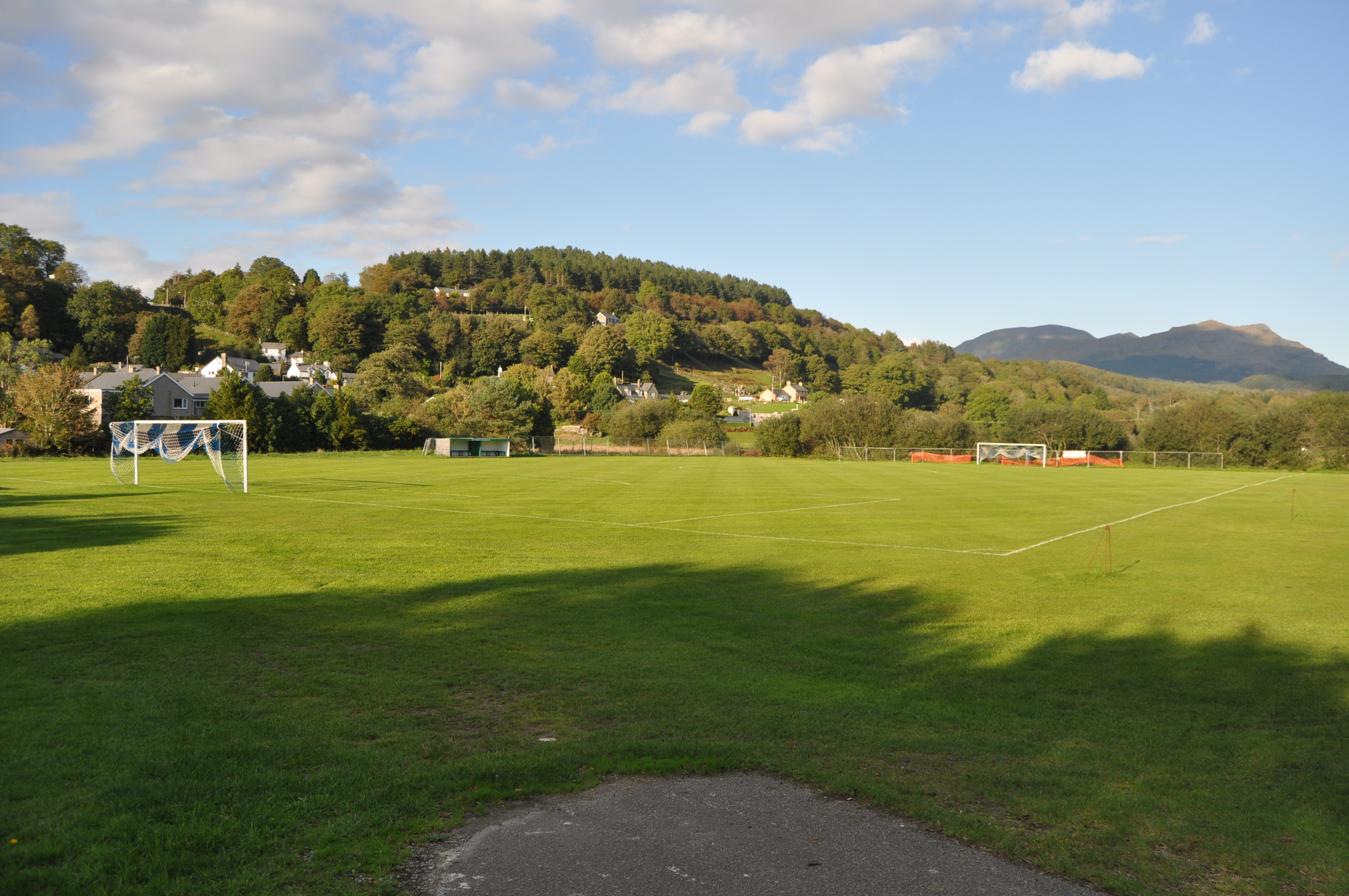
Maes Y Parc (October 2013)

Clwb Pêl-Droed Penrhyndeudraeth, in its current form, was formed in 1981, joining the Sain Caernarfon & District League. Matches were played on the Cae Sarn pitch, in the centre of the village, and despite various problems with the nature of the facilities, the club grew from strength to strength, winning the League Championship in the 1984–85 and 1985–86 seasons; Alves Cup in 1984–85; Will Evans Cup in 1985–86 and the Moorings Cup in 1984–85 and 1985–86. Promotion was gained to the Gwynedd League for the 1986–87 season, when the Club moved to its current Maes Y Parc ground. Honours achieved in the following seasons were the Wyn Burrows (Most Sporting Team) Trophy at the end of the 1991–92, 1995–96 and 1996–97 seasons; the Heritage Homes Eryri Shield in 1995–96, President's Cup runners-up 1996–97, but winners of that Cup in 1997–98, as well as Gwynedd League runners-up at the end of the 1998–99 season. Despite an opportunity of promotion to the Welsh Alliance League at that time, the team disbanded and the 1999–2000 season saw the Club go an entire season without winning a single League match, and relegation followed to the Caernarfon & District League.

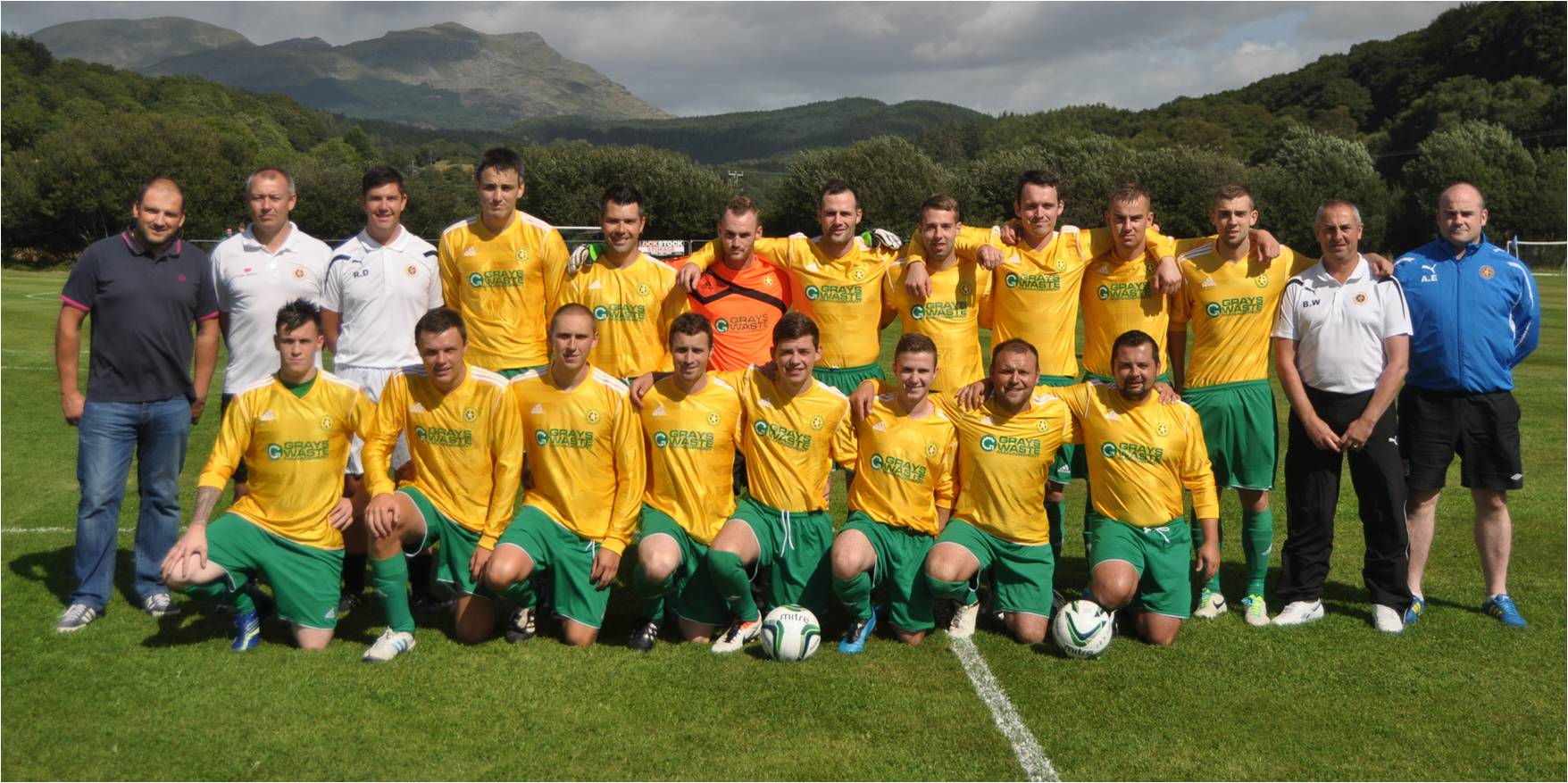
CPD Penrhyndeudraeth FC 2013–14 (Aug 2013)

The club saw many managerial and squad changes, with little or no success, until the 2009–10 season, when the team were finalists in the League's Gwynedd Safeflue Cup and their League position led to promotion from Caernarfon & District Division 2 to Division 1. The team were then runners-up in Division 1 and winners of the Kon-X Wales Cup and Moorings Cup in 2010–11 under the management of Gareth Piercy and Richard Davies. During the next pre-season, Gareth Piercy resigned as manager, with Richard Davies taking over and added Bleddyn Williams as his assistant. Promotion was eventually and belatedly gained to the Gwynedd League and the team achieved a League treble, League Championship and winners of both the Gwynedd Safeflue Shield and Bob Owen Memorial Shield. The 2012–13 season, the club's first ever at Welsh Alliance League level, was again a success – finishing 3rd in the League, winning the Take Stock Van Hire Cup (for 2nd Division Clubs), runners-up in the Mawddach Challenge Cup and also the trophy for the best official programme in the League's 2nd Division. The 2013–14 season saw the Club being champions of the Welsh Alliance 2nd Division, finalists in the Take Stock Van Hire Cup and semi-finalists in the FAW Trophy, also winning the trophy for the best official programme in the League's 2nd Division, for the second season in succession. 2014–15 saw the team finish 5th in the Welsh Alliance 1st Division, as well as reaching the final of the FAW Trophy, which was the most prestigious day ever in the club's history. In the 2015–16 season, the team finished 6th in the Welsh Alliance 1st Division and added a new trophy to the honours list by winning the Mawddach Challenge Cup, another memorable day in the club's relatively short history. 2016–17 saw another 6th-place finish and another cup final, eventually losing out to Glantraeth in the closing minutes of extra time in the Cookson Cup Final. 2017-18 saw a slightly disappointed season compared to previous seasons with an eighth-place finish in the league and no cup final appearance in any trophy. 2018-19 was a second successive eight place finish for Penrhyndeudraeth but they also did reach a cup final in the Lock Stock Cookson Cup when they narrowly lost 1–0 against Llangefni at Y Traeth, Porthmadog.

During the 2019–20 season, COVID-19 pandemic hit the world and brought an abrupt stop to football. Penrhyn's last game before the pandemic was a 3–2 victory over Blaenau Ffestiniog on 7 March 2020. At that time Penrhyn were sitting 7th in the league, having played at least three games more than the teams around them and in some instances 5 games more. When the season had to be finished early, it was decided the league was going to be decided on points per game and due to the fact Penrhyn had played at least three games more than the teams around them this meant that they finished the season in ninth 0.01 points per game below Nantlle Vale in eighth. After the 2019–20 season there was a restructure at the third tier of Welsh football with the introduction of the Ardal Leagues which meant four leagues of 16 clubs at the third division. This division meant the end of the Welsh Alliance League and now the third division would be under the control of the FAW and not the regional FA. Penrhyndeudraeth, thinking there would be no chance they could meet the deadline for ground improvements didn't apply for one of the 64 spots in the Ardal leagues, but because of Covid the 2020-21 leagues didn't happen and the new Ardal leagues didn't start until the 2021–22 by which time the ground improvements meeting tier 3 standards were completed but because they hadn't applied they were unable to stay at tier 3 level for the return of football after Covid. This meant a return to the fourth tier for Penrhyn for the first time since 2013–14. The North Wales Coast FA decided that while tier 3 were have a restructure tier 4 and 5 would also have a restructure and after a forced demotion for Penrhyn over the pandemic, Penrhyn started the 2021–22 in the North Wales Coast West Football League Premier Division at the fourth tier of Welsh football. During the 2021-22 Penrhyn finished third in a best of the rest behind the two runaway leaders in Bodedern Athletic and Bangor 1876. Penrhyn averaged 2 point per game but still finished 23 and 18 points behind the front two.

In the summer of 2022 Penrhyn lost ten players either to retirements or players leaving for other clubs and therefore Penrhyn went into the 2022–23 season with a much changed and much more youthful side and it did show as Penrhyn went from averaging two points per game in the previous season to averaging one point per game. Penrhyn ended the season finishing in tenth out of fifteenth winning nine league game throughout the season.

== League standings in recent years ==
Season	League	Position	Played	Won	Drawn	Lost	For	Against	+/-	Points
2024–25	North Wales Coast West Football League Premier Division	7th	30	13	7	10	81	71	10	46
2023–24	North Wales Coast West Football League Premier Division	11th	28	8	4	16	54	72	-18	28
2022–23	North Wales Coast West Football League Premier Division	10th	28	9	1	18	36	84	-48	28
2021–22	North Wales Coast West Football League Premier Division	3rd	28	17	5	6	86	39	47	56
2019–20 *	Welsh Alliance League (Div. 1)	9th *	23	10	3	10	46	48	-2	33
2018–19	Welsh Alliance League (Div. 1)	8th	28	11	5	12	65	56	9	38
2017–18	Welsh Alliance League (Div. 1)	8th	28	11	5	12	55	49	6	38
2016–17	Welsh Alliance League (Div. 1)	6th	30	14	7	9	66	46	20	49
2015–16	Welsh Alliance League (Div. 1)	6th	30	15	5	10	81	53	28	50
2014–15	Welsh Alliance League (Div. 1)	5th	26	12	6	8	55	44	11	42
2013–14	Welsh Alliance League (Div. 2)	1st	24	22	1	1	114	23	91	67
2012–13	Welsh Alliance League (Div. 2)	3rd	24	15	3	6	73	32	41	48
2011–12	Gwynedd League	1st	24	20	3	1	104	33	71	63
2010–11	Caernarfon & District League (Div. 1)	2nd	20	15	2	3	65	27	38	47
2009–10	Caernarfon & District League (Div. 2)	3rd	14	6	5	3	31	22	9	23
2008–09	Caernarfon & District League (Div. 2)	5th	12	4	3	5	26	29	−3	15
2007–08	Caernarfon & District League (Div. 2)	8th	18	5	1	12	38	56	−18	16
2006–07	Caernarfon & District League	12th	26	8	3	15	49	76	−27	27
2005–06	Caernarfon & District League	15th	28	2	3	23	33	114	−81	9
2004–05	Caernarfon & District League	10th	28	8	5	15	51	75	−24	29
2003–04	Caernarfon & District League	11th	26	7	3	16	52	88	−36	24
2002–03	Caernarfon & District League	9th	26	9	1	16	64	75	−11	28
2001–02	Caernarfon & District League	5th	22	12	1	9	75	61	14	37
2000/01	Gwynedd League	14th	26	0	0	26	15	116	−101	0

* Season interrupted due to covid and was cancelled. League table was decided on point per game which Penrhyn had 1.43 ppg

=== Results Grid - 2018–19 season ===
Home \ Away	BDU	BOD	GRE	LNB	LNA	LNJ	LLD	LLG	LRU	LRW	MYN	NAN	PEN	PRE	STA
Barmouth & Dyffryn United	—	0–2	1–2	1–2	0–1	4–1	1–2	1–3	1–3	1–4	2–0	1–4	0–6	3–3	6–1
Bodedern Athletic	3–0	—	2–1	6–1	0–1	8–0	4–1	0–2	3–1	7–1	2–1	3–2	3–0	2–1	6–1
Greenfield	2–1	1–1	—	1–0	3–1	4–1	4–0	0–0	0–0	0–1	1–1	2–0	4–3	2–0	2–3
Llanberis	1–2	2–0	3–3	—	2–2	3–0	2–2	0–0	0–0	2–3	4–1	2–2	1–1	3–0	3–3
Llandudno Albion	3–1	5–1	4–0	5–1	—	4–3	0–1	0–5	1–1	4–3	8–1	3–0	2–4	4–0	1–2
Llandudno Junction	2–2	1–4	1–4	1–2	0–3	—	1–2	0–3	0–4	0–6	0–2	1–6	1–1	1–2	0–4
Llandyrnog United	2–1	1–0	1–3	1–1	2–3	0–1	—	1–2	1–2	1–3	1–1	1–1	1–1	1–2	0–3
Llangefni Town	7–0	2–0	4–2	2–1	2–0	8–0	3–0	—	1–2	3–0	0–2	1–2	4–1	2–0	1–0
Llanrug United	1–1	1–3	4–4	1–2	2–6	6–0	5–1	0–2	—	4–0	0–2	3–2	3–1	3–0	3–1
Llanrwst United	5–0	0–3	1–1	1–2	0–2	1–0	5–0	1–1	1–1	—	4–1	0–2	2–0	0–2	3–1
Mynydd Llandegai	1–1	1–4	4–0	4–1	2–3	1–1	4–3	0–0	2–2	3–2	—	1–1	1–5	4–2	0–4
Nantlle Vale	1–0	4–2	0–1	1–1	6–1	2–0	4–0	0–2	0–0	2–1	5–1	—	3–0	2–2	4–0
Penrhyndeudraeth	2–0	0–1	4–2	2–3	1–3	8–0	4–2	0–3	2–2	2–0	2–3	5–3	—	3–3	3–1
Prestatyn Sports	1–0	0–1	3–2	3–1	3–4	1–2	6–1	2–3	2–1	3–2	5–0	4–3	1–3	—	2–1
St Asaph City	3–3	0–1	2–3	2–0	2–2	3–1	1–1	1–8	1–2	4–2	2–2	2–1	4–1	2–0	—

Updated to match(es) played on 23 February 2019. Source: Welsh Alliance League - Results Grid
Legend: Blue = home team win; Yellow = draw; Red = away team win.

== Honours ==
- Cynghrair Caernarfon a’r Cylch / Caernarfon & District League
  - Champions: 1984–85, 1985–86
  - Runners-up: 2010–11
- Cwpan Alves / Alves Cup
  - Winners: 1984–85
- Cwpan Will Evans / Will Evans Cup
  - Winners: 1985–86
  - Finalists: 1984–85, 1986–87
- Cwpan Moorings / Moorings Cup
  - Winners: 1984–85, 1985–86, 2010–11
  - Finalists: 1986–87

* Promoted to Gwynedd League 1987 *

- Tlws Cynghrair Gwynedd League ‘Most Sporting Club’ Wyn Burrows Trophy
  - Winners: 1991–92, 1995–96, 1996–97
- Cwpan Meirionydd / Meirionydd Cup
  - Winners: 1994
- Tarian Heritage Homes (Wales) Ltd. Eryri Shield
  - Winners: 1995–96
- Cwpan y Llywydd Cynghrair Gwynedd League Presidents Cup
  - Finalists: 1996–97
  - Winners: 1997–98
- Cynghrair Pêl-Droed Hyfforddiant Gwynedd Training Football League
  - Runners-up: 1998–99
- Cwpan Safeflue Caernarfon a'r Cylch / Caernarfon & District Safeflue Cup
  - Finalists: 2009–10

* Promoted to Caernarfon & District League Division 1 *

- Cwpan Kon-X Cymru / Kon-X Wales Cup
  - Winners: 2010–11
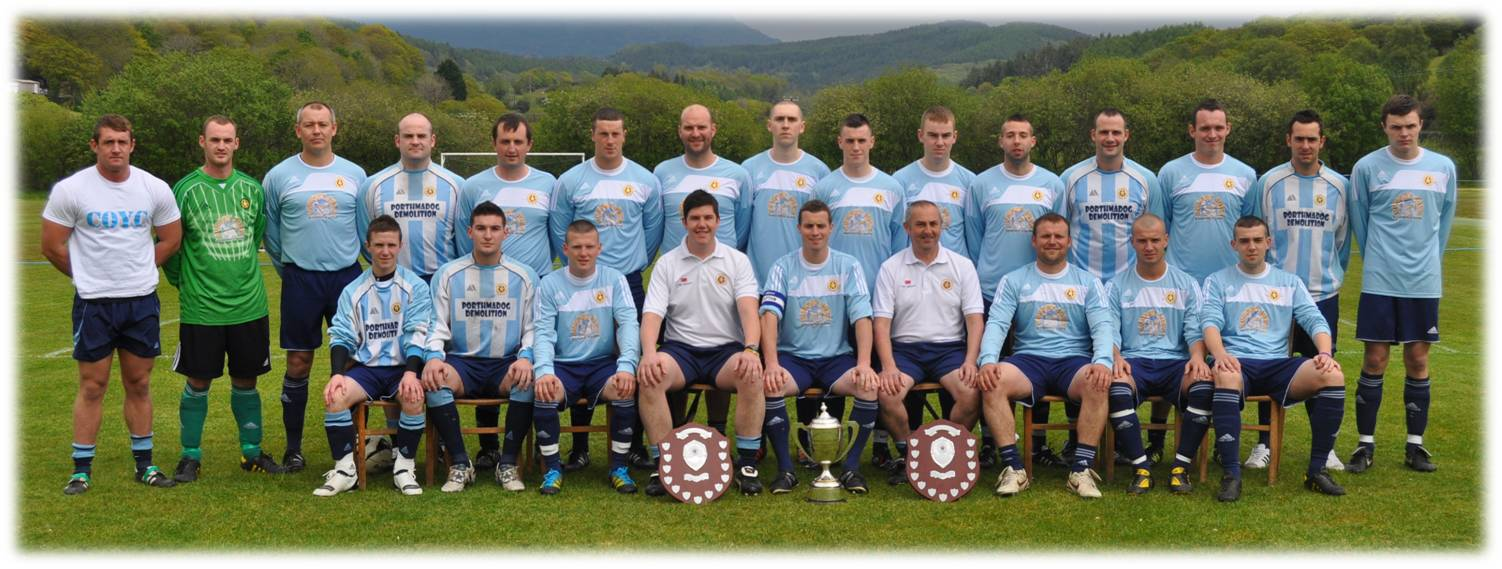
    Treble winning season (2011–2012)

* Promoted to Gwynedd League 2011 *

- Cynghrair Pêl-Droed Gwynedd Football League
  - Champions: 2011–12
- Tarian Gwynedd Safeflue Shield
  - Winners: 2011–12
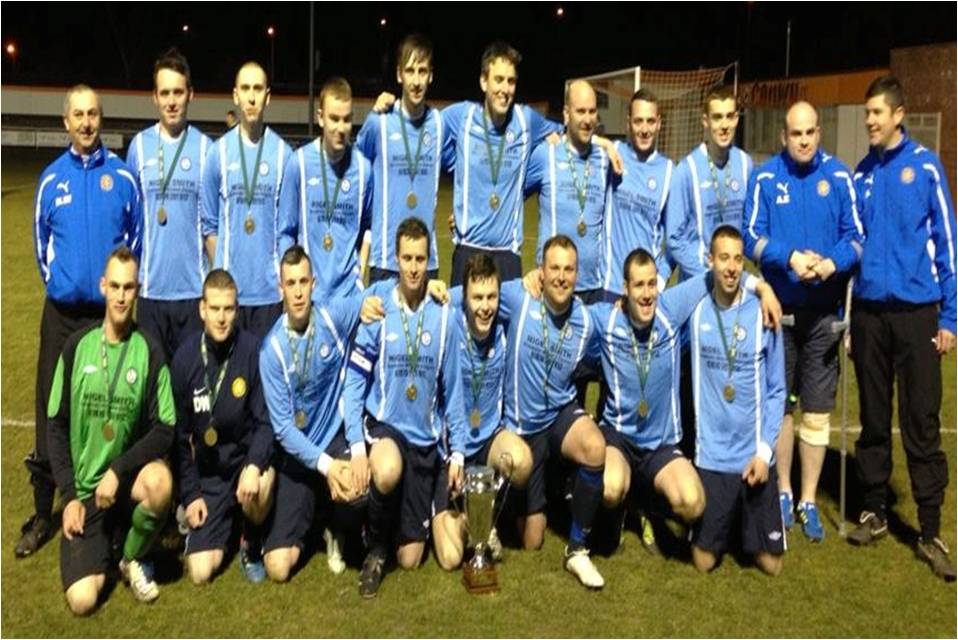
    Take Stock Van Hire Cup Winners (2012–2013)
- Tarian Goffa Bob Owen Memorial Shield
  - Winners: 2011–12

* Promoted to Lock Stock Welsh Alliance League Division 2 *

- Cwpan Take Stock Van Hire Cup
  - Winners: 2012–13
  - Finalists: 2013–14
- Cwpan Her Mawddach / Mawddach Challenge Cup
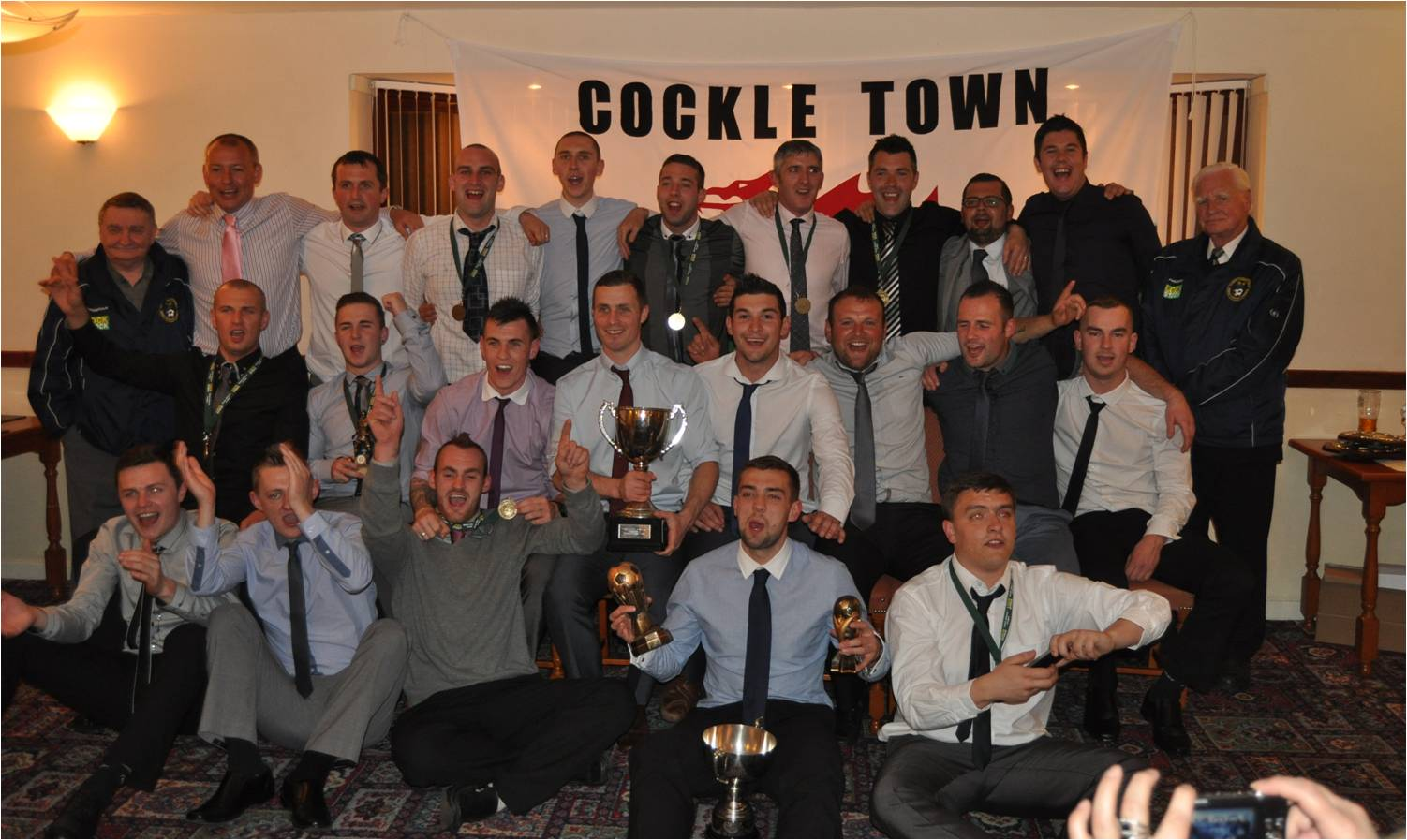
  League Champions (2013–2014)
  - Finalists: 2012–13
  - Winners: 2015–16
- Rhaglen Y Flwyddyn / Programme of the Year
  - Winners: 2012–13, 2013–14
- Cynghrair Pêl-Droed Undebol Lock Stock y Gogledd / Lock Stock Welsh Alliance Football League
  - Champions: 2013–14 (Adran 2 / Division 2)

* Promoted to Lock Stock Welsh Alliance League Division 1 *

- Tlws CBDC / FAW Trophy
  - Finalists: 2014–15
- Cwpan Cookson Lock Stock / Lock Stock Cookson Cup
  - Finalists: 2016–17, 2018–19
- Cwpan Canolradd CBDAGC / NWCFA Intermediate Challenge Cup
  - Finalists: 2023–24

== Current squad ==
Note: Flags indicate national team as defined under FIFA eligibility rules; some limited exceptions apply. Players may hold more than one non-FIFA nationality.

No.	Pos.	Nation	Player
—	GK	(Wales) WAL	Aron Wilson
—	GK	(Wales) WAL	Iwan Davies
—	DF	(Wales) WAL	Cedri Jones (Vice Captain)
—	DF	(Wales) WAL	Dylan Elfyn Davies
—	DF	(Wales) WAL	Emlyn Price
—	DF	(Wales) WAL	Harri Davies
—	DF	(Wales) WAL	Ifan Jones
—	DF	(Wales) WAL	Meilir Edwards
—	DF	(Wales) WAL	Morgan Roberts
—	DF	(Wales) WAL	Richard Jones
—	MF	(Wales) WAL	Alun Hughes
—	MF	(Wales) WAL	Callum Jones
—	MF	(Wales) WAL	Deegan John (Captain)

No.	Pos.	Nation	Player
—	MF	(Wales) WAL	Huw Quaeck
—	MF	(Wales) WAL	Iwan Lane
—	MF	(Wales) WAL	Owain Williams
—	MF	(Wales) WAL	Reece Evans
—	FW	(Wales) WAL	Cai Henshaw
—	FW	(Wales) WAL	Cian Pritchard
—	FW	(Wales) WAL	Gwion Davies
—	FW	(Wales) WAL	Ian Brown
—	FW	(Wales) WAL	Owen Pritchard
—	FW	(Wales) WAL	Tom Hughes
—	FW	(Wales) WAL	Tomos Smith
—	FW	(Wales) WAL	Ynyr Lane

=== Management ===
Manager	(Wales) Steffan Jones
Assistant	(Wales) Barry Evans

== Club Officials ==
Role	Name
Chairman	(Wales) Desmond Jones
Secretary	(Wales) Aled Thomas
Treasurer	(Wales) Gareth Piercy
Groundsmen	(Wales) Aled Thomas (Wales) Owen Evans

== Junior Teams ==
All play in the Gwyrfai Junior Football League

Under 17	Coaches: (Wales) Steffan Jones
Under 15	Coaches: (Wales) Iwan Roberts & (Wales) Robert Watson
Under 13	Coaches: (Wales) Paul Clark & (Wales) Gwion Roberts
Under 11	Coaches: (Wales) Sion Harris & (Wales) Asa Bentham
Under 9	Coaches: (Wales) Gareth Piercy, (Wales) Liam Watson & (Wales) Steffan Jones
