= 2001–02 Welsh Alliance League =

Welsh Alliance League
- Season: 2001–02
- Champions: Amlwch Town
- Matches: 156
- Goals: 670 (4.29 per match)

The 2001–02 Welsh Alliance League is the 18th season of the Welsh Alliance League, which is in the third level of the Welsh football pyramid.

The league consists of thirteen teams and concluded with Amlwch Town as champions and promoted to the Cymru Alliance.

== Teams ==
Llanfairpwll were champions in the previous season and were promoted to the Cymru Alliance.

Abergele Town and Colwyn Bay YMCA were replaced by Gwynedd League champions, Y Felinheli and Clwyd League champions, Rhydymwyn.

Locations of the teams of the 2001–02 Welsh Alliance League

=== Grounds and locations ===
Team	Location	Ground
Amlwch Town	Amlwch	Lôn Bach
Bangor City Reserves	Bangor	Farrar Road Stadium
Bethesda Athletic	Bethesda	Parc Meurig
Caerwys	Caerwys	Lon yr Ysgol
Conwy United	Conwy	Y Morfa Stadium
Glan Conwy	Glan Conwy	Cae Ffwt
Llandudno Junction	Llandudno Junction	Arriva Ground
Locomotive Llanberis	Llanberis	Ffordd Padarn
Penmaenmawr Phoenix	Penmaenmawr	Cae Sling
Prestatyn Town	Prestatyn	Bastion Road
Rhydymwyn	Rhydymwyn	Dolfechlas Road
Rhyl Reserves	Rhyl	Belle Vue
Y Felinheli	Y Felinheli	Cae Selio

== League table ==
Pos	Team	Pld	W	D	L	GF	GA	GD	Pts	Promotion or relegation
1	Amlwch Town (C, P)	24	20	3	1	94	28	+66	63	Promotion to Cymru Alliance
2	Conwy United	24	18	2	4	57	28	+29	56	
3	Rhyl Reserves	24	13	5	6	43	31	+12	44	
4	Y Felinheli	24	13	4	7	44	34	+10	43	
5	Llandudno Junction	24	13	3	8	52	30	+22	42	
6	Bangor City Reserves	24	12	3	9	63	41	+22	39	
7	Bethesda Athletic	24	11	4	9	60	40	+20	37	
8	Locomotive Llanberis	24	10	4	10	58	57	+1	34	
9	Prestatyn Town	24	8	5	11	40	49	−9	29	
10	Rhydymwyn	24	9	2	13	50	60	−10	29	
11	Penmaenmawr Phoenix	24	3	4	17	39	79	−40	13	
12	Glan Conwy	24	2	4	18	38	79	−41	10	
13	Caerwys	24	1	3	20	32	96	−64	6	

Source: Welsh Football Data Archive
Rules for classification: 1) Points; 2) Goal difference; 3) Goals scored; 4) Matches won; 5) Play-off.
(C) Champions; (P) Promoted
