= 2004–05 Welsh Alliance League =

Welsh Alliance League
- Season: 2004–05
- Champions: Bodedern
- Relegated: Y Felinheli
- Matches: 240
- Goals: 888 (3.7 per match)

The 2004–05 Welsh Alliance League is the 21st season of the Welsh Alliance League, which is in the third level of the Welsh football pyramid.

The league consists of sixteen teams and concluded with Bodedern Athletic as champions and promoted to the Cymru Alliance. Bottom team, Y Felinheli were relegated to the Gwynedd League.

== Teams ==
Rhyl Reserves were champions in the previous season, Llandyrnog United finished runners-up and were promoted to the Cymru Alliance. They were replaced by Gwynedd League champions Llanrwst United.

Locations of the teams of the 2004–05 Welsh Alliance League

=== Grounds and locations ===
Team	Location	Ground
Bethesda Athletic	Bethesda	Parc Meurig
Bodedern Athletic	Bodedern	Cae Ty Cristion
Caerwys	Caerwys	Lon yr Ysgol
Conwy United	Conwy	Y Morfa Stadium
Denbigh Town	Denbigh	Central Park.
Glan Conwy	Glan Conwy	Cae Ffwt
Llanberis	Llanberis	Ffordd Padarn
Llandudno Junction F.C.	Llandudno Junction	Arriva Ground
Llanrug United	Llanrug	Eithin Duon
Llanrwst United	Llanrwst	Gwydir Park
Penmaenmawr Phoenix	Penmaenmawr	Cae Sling
Prestatyn Town	Prestatyn	Bastion Road
Rhydymwyn	Rhydymwyn	Dolfechlas Road
Rhyl Reserves	Rhyl	Belle Vue
Sealand Leisure	Sealand	
Y Felinheli	Y Felinheli	Cae Selio

== League table ==
Pos	Team	Pld	W	D	L	GF	GA	GD	Pts	Promotion or relegation
1	Bodedern (C, P)	30	21	4	5	77	32	+45	67	Promotion to Cymru Alliance
2	Rhydymwyn	30	20	6	4	69	37	+32	66	
3	Bethesda Athletic	30	18	8	4	100	42	+58	62	
4	Rhyl Reserves	30	18	7	5	80	31	+49	61	
5	Conwy United	30	19	4	7	70	42	+28	61	
6	Prestatyn Town	30	16	5	9	61	45	+16	53	
7	Llanrwst United	30	12	7	11	45	36	+9	43	
8	Denbigh Town	30	13	3	14	54	65	−11	42	
9	Llanberis	30	10	7	13	44	47	−3	37	
10	Sealand Leisure	30	10	5	15	39	53	−14	35	
11	Glan Conwy	30	9	8	13	43	58	−15	35	
12	Llandudno Junction	30	10	3	17	65	56	+9	33	
13	Llanrug United (Note: Llanrug United were deducted one point.)	30	6	8	16	36	65	−29	25	
14	Caerwys	30	7	4	19	40	82	−42	25	
15	Penmaenmawr Phoenix (Note: Penmaenmawr Phoenix were deducted three points.)	30	6	5	19	37	85	−48	20	
16	Y Felinheli (R)	30	2	2	26	28	112	−84	8	Relegation to Gwynedd League

Source: Welsh Football Data Archive
Rules for classification: 1) Points; 2) Goal difference; 3) Goals scored; 4) Matches won; 5) Play-off.
(C) Champions; (P) Promoted; (R) Relegated
