= 2005–06 Welsh Alliance League =

Welsh Alliance League
- Season: 2005–06
- Champions: Prestatyn Town
- Relegated: Cemaes Bay and Penmaenmawr Phoenix
- Matches: 240
- Goals: 990 (4.13 per match)
- All statistics correct as of 24 February 2019.

The 2005–06 Welsh Alliance League is the 22nd season of the Welsh Alliance League, which is in the third level of the Welsh football pyramid.

The league consists of sixteen teams and concluded with Prestatyn Town as champions and promoted to the Cymru Alliance. Cemaes Bay were relegated to the Gwynedd League and Penmaenmawr Phoenix were relegated to the Clwyd League.

== Teams ==
Bodedern Athletic were champions in the previous season. They were replaced by Cemaes Bay who were relegated from the Cymru Alliance and Nefyn United who were promoted from the Gwynedd League.

Locations of the teams of the 2005–06 Welsh Alliance League

=== Grounds and locations ===
Team	Location	Ground
Bethesda Athletic	Bethesda	Parc Meurig
Caerwys	Caerwys	Lon yr Ysgol
Cemaes Bay	Cemaes	School Lane
Conwy United	Conwy	Y Morfa Stadium
Denbigh Town	Denbigh	Central Park.
Glan Conwy	Glan Conwy	Cae Ffwt
Llanberis	Llanberis	Ffordd Padarn
Llandudno Junction F.C.	Llandudno Junction	Arriva Ground
Llanrug United	Llanrug	Eithin Duon
Llanrwst United	Llanrwst	Gwydir Park
Nefyn United	Nefyn	Cae'r Delyn
Penmaenmawr Phoenix	Penmaenmawr	Cae Sling
Prestatyn Town	Prestatyn	Bastion Road
Rhydymwyn	Rhydymwyn	Dolfechlas Road
Rhyl Reserves	Rhyl	Belle Vue
Sealand Rovers	Sealand	

== League table ==
Pos	Team	Pld	W	D	L	GF	GA	GD	Pts	Promotion or relegation
1	Prestatyn Town (C, P)	30	25	5	0	114	28	+86	80	Promotion to Cymru Alliance
2	Denbigh Town	30	23	2	5	90	31	+59	71	
3	Bethesda Athletic	30	22	3	5	101	43	+58	69	
4	Rhyl Reserves	30	21	5	4	94	36	+58	68	
5	Llanrwst United	30	19	3	8	74	35	+39	60	
6	Nefyn United	30	16	2	12	60	57	+3	50	
7	Llandudno Junction	30	12	7	11	53	53	0	43	
8	Llanrug United	30	12	6	12	47	57	−10	42	
9	Llanberis	30	12	4	14	55	55	0	40	
10	Rhydymwyn	30	11	3	16	48	69	−21	36	
11	Caerwys	30	11	0	19	60	83	−23	33	
12	Conwy United	30	9	5	16	41	50	−9	32	
13	Glan Conwy	30	6	5	19	38	72	−34	23	
14	Sealand Rovers	30	6	2	22	40	92	−52	20	
15	Cemaes Bay (R)	30	5	3	22	38	127	−89	18	Relegation to Gwynedd League
16	Penmaenmawr Phoenix (Note: Penmaenmawr Phoenix were deducted three points.) (R)	30	1	3	26	37	102	−65	3	Relegation to Clwyd League

Source: Welsh Football Data Archive
Rules for classification: 1) Points; 2) Goal difference; 3) Goals scored; 4) Matches won; 5) Play-off.
(C) Champions; (P) Promoted; (R) Relegated
