= 2002–03 Welsh Alliance League =

Welsh Alliance League
- Season: 2002–03
- Champions: Glantraeth
- Matches: 210
- Goals: 824 (3.92 per match)

The 2002–03 Welsh Alliance League is the 19th season of the Welsh Alliance League, which is in the third level of the Welsh football pyramid.

The league consists of fifteen teams and concluded with Glantraeth as champions and promoted to the Cymru Alliance.

== Teams ==
Amlwch Town were champions in the previous season and were promoted to the Cymru Alliance. They were replaced by Denbigh Town who were relegated from the Cymru Alliance, Gwynedd League champions, Bodedern Athletic and Clwyd League champions, Sealand Leisure.

Locations of the teams of the 2002–03 Welsh Alliance League

=== Grounds and locations ===
Team	Location	Ground
Bethesda Athletic	Bethesda	Parc Meurig
Bodedern Athletic	Bodedern	Cae Ty Cristion
Caerwys	Caerwys	Lon yr Ysgol
Conwy United	Conwy	Y Morfa Stadium
Denbigh Town	Denbigh	Central Park.
Glan Conwy	Glan Conwy	Cae Ffwt
Glantraeth	Bodorgan	Trefdraeth
Llandudno Junction F.C.	Llandudno Junction	Arriva Ground
Locomotive Llanberis	Llanberis	Ffordd Padarn
Penmaenmawr Phoenix	Penmaenmawr	Cae Sling
Prestatyn Town	Prestatyn	Bastion Road
Rhydymwyn	Rhydymwyn	Dolfechlas Road
Rhyl Reserves	Rhyl	Belle Vue
Sealand Leisure	Sealand	
Y Felinheli	Y Felinheli	Cae Selio

== League table ==
Pos	Team	Pld	W	D	L	GF	GA	GD	Pts	Promotion or relegation
1	Glantraeth (C, P)	28	19	5	4	118	33	+85	62	Promotion to Cymru Alliance
2	Bodedern	28	18	7	3	65	19	+46	61	
3	Denbigh Town	28	17	5	6	64	31	+33	56	
4	Bethesda Athletic	28	17	2	9	74	44	+30	53	
5	Rhyl Reserves	28	15	6	7	62	31	+31	51	
6	Locomotive Llanberis	28	12	7	9	47	42	+5	43	
7	Llandudno Junction	28	12	7	9	57	53	+4	43	
8	Rhydymwyn	28	11	6	11	52	54	−2	39	
9	Sealand Leisure	28	10	6	12	44	63	−19	36	
10	Y Felinheli (Note: Y Felinheli were deducted three points.)	28	10	4	14	44	60	−16	31	
11	Caerwys	28	9	4	15	57	78	−21	31	
12	Prestatyn Town	28	7	7	14	32	58	−26	28	
13	Glan Conwy (Note: Glan Conwy were deducted three points.)	28	4	8	16	42	89	−47	17	
14	Penmaenmawr Phoenix	28	4	5	19	35	83	−48	17	
15	Conwy United	28	4	3	21	31	86	−55	15	

Source: Welsh Football Data Archive
Rules for classification: 1) Points; 2) Goal difference; 3) Goals scored; 4) Matches won; 5) Play-off.
(C) Champions; (P) Promoted
