= 2009–10 Welsh Cup =

2009–10 Welsh Football Association Challenge Cup
Welsh Senior Cup

Tournament details
- Country: Wales
- Teams: 131

Final positions
- Champions: Bangor City
- Runners-up: Port Talbot Town

Tournament statistics
- Matches played: 115

The 2009–10 FAW Welsh Cup was the 123rd edition of the annual knockout tournament for competitive football teams in Wales, excluding those who play in the English League System. The 2009–10 tournament commenced on 14 August 2009 and concluded at Parc y Scarlets on 1 May 2010. Bangor City won the cup with a 3–2 win against Port Talbot Town.

== Calendar ==
Round	Date	Fixtures	New entrants	Prize money
Preliminary Round	15 August 2009	23	46	
First Round	12 September 2009	44	65	
Second Round	3 October 2009	32	20	Losers: £500
Third Round	31 October 2009	16		Losers: £1,000
Fourth Round	30 January 2010	8		Losers: £2,500
Fifth Round	27 February 2010	4		Losers: £5,000
Semifinals	10 April 2010	2		Losers: £10,000
Final	2 May 2010	1		Winner: £25,000; Loser: £15,000

== Preliminary round ==
=== North ===
15 August 2009	Barmouth & Dyffryn United	2–0	Dyffryn Banw	Wern Mynach, Barmouth
14:00

15 August 2009	Blaenau Ffestiniog Amateur	0–3	Glan Conwy
14:00			Joe Williams; Ashley Smith; Shaun Shannon

15 August 2009	Borras Park Albion	4–1	Rhos Aelwyd
14:00

15 August 2009	Brickfield Rangers	0–4	Hawarden Rangers	Court Road, Wrexham
14:00

Coedpoeth United	w/o	Llanllyfni

15 August 2009	Corwen Amateurs	1–2	Chirk AAA
14:00

15 August 2009	Dolgellau Athletic Amateur	7–2	Llanfyllin Town
14:00

15 August 2009	Halkyn United	1–2	Tywyn & Bryncrug	Pant Newydd, Halkyn
14:00

15 August 2009	Holywell Town	0–5	Llanrug United
14:00

15 August 2009	Llandudno Junction	3–2 (a.e.t.)	Castell Alun Colts	The Flyover, Llandudno Junction
14:00

15 August 2009	Pwllheli	6–0	Nantlle Vale	Leisure Centre, Pwllheli
14:00

Source: FAW Welsh Cup

=== South ===
15 August 2009	AFC Llwydcoed	3–1	AFC Porth	Welfare Ground, Aberdare
14:00

15 August 2009	Bow Street	0–1	Aberbargoed Buds	Cae Piod, Bow Street
14:00

18 August 2009	Cardiff Bay Harlequins	2–0	UWIC	Cardiff International Sports Stadium, Cardiff
19:30	h

15 August 2009	Cwmamman United	4–5 (a.e.t.)	Presteigne St. Andrews	Grenig Park, Cwmamman
14:00

15 August 2009	Garw	0–4	Cwmbran Celtic
14:00

14 August 2009	Hay St Marys	1–1 (a.e.t.) (5–4 p)	Monmouth Town	Breacon Road, Hereford
19:00	K.Jones 55'		P.Tranter 33'

15 August 2009	Llanwern	0–5	South Gower	Newport Stadium, Newport
14:00

15 August 2009	Maesteg Park	2–4 (a.e.t.)	Llantwit Fardre	Tonteg Park, Tonteg
14:00

15 August 2009	Newport YMCA	3–5	Croesyceiliog	YMCA Ground, Newport
14:00

15 August 2009	Rhayader Town	0–2	Newport Civil Service	The Weirglodd, Rhayader
14:00

15 August 2009	Seven Sisters	2–0	Briton Ferry Llansawel	Welfare Ground, Neath
14:00

15 August 2009	Tredegar Town	3–0	Pontyclun	Tredegar Leisure Complex, Tredegar
14:00

15 August 2009	Troedyrhiw	3–1	Cwmbran Town	The Willows, Merthyr Tydfil
14:00

Source: FAW Welsh Cup

== First round ==
=== North ===
12 September 2009	Amlwch Town	2–3	Penrhyncoch	Lôn Bach, Amlwch
14:30

12 September 2009	Barmouth & Dyffryn United	3–2	Buckley Town	Wern Mynach, Barmouth
14:30

12 September 2009	Berriew	3–1	Mold Alexandra	Berriew Recreational Ground, Berriew
14:30

12 September 2009	Brymbo	1–6	Llangefni Town	The Crick, Brymbo
14:30

12 September 2009	Carno	2–3	Conwy United	Ty Brith Field, Carno

12 September 2009	Chirk AAA	1–3	Gresford Athletic	Holyhead Road, Chirk
14:30

12 September 2009	Coedpoeth United	2–0	Penparcau	Penyfelli Playing Fields, Coedpoeth
14:30

12 September 2009	Glan Conwy	2–1	Denbigh Town	Cae Ffwt, Glan Conwy
14:30

12 September 2009	Guilsfield	1–3	Llangollen Town	Community Centre Ground, Guilsfield
14:30

12 September 2009	Hawarden Rangers	0–2	Ruthin Town	Gladstone Playing Fields, Hawarden
14:30

12 September 2009	Lex XI	5–3	Dolgellau Athletic Amateur	Stansty Park, Wrexham
14:30

12 September 2009	Llanberis	1–2	Flint Town United	Ffordd Dadarn, Llanberis
14:30

12 September 2009	Llandudno	3–1	Bethesda Athletic	Maesdu Park, Llandudno
14:30

12 September 2009	Llandudno Junction	1–0	Llanrhaeadr	The Flyover, Llandudno Junction
14:30

12 September 2009	Llanfairpwll	2–1	Penycae	Maes Eilian, Llanfairpwll
14:30

12 September 2009	Llanrug United	4–3	Nefyn United	Eithen Duon, Llanrug
14:30

12 September 2009	Llanrwst United	0–2	Llangeinor	Gwydir Park, Llanrwst
14:30

12 September 2009	Llansantffraid Village	3–1	Llay Welfare	Recreation Ground, Llansantffraid-ym-Mechain
14:30

12 September 2009	Overton Recreation	1–2 (a.e.t.)	Holyhead Hotspur	Wrexham Road, Overton-on-Dee
14:30

12 September 2009	Pwllheli	2–0	Tywyn & Bryncrug	Leisure Centre, Pwllheli
14:30

12 September 2009	Rhydymwyn	2–0	Llandyrnog United	Dolfechlas Road, Rhydymwyn
14:30

12 September 2009	Venture Community	3 –4 (a.e.t.)	Borras Park Albion	Dunks, Wrexham
14:30

Source: FAW Welsh Cup

=== South ===
12 September 2009	Barry Town	1–5	Ely Rangers	Jenner Park, Barry
14:30

11 September 2009	Bryntirion Athletic	4–2	Cardiff Corinthians	Bryntirion Park, Bridgend
17:30

12 September 2009	Caerau (Ely)	2–0	Bettws	Cwrt y Ala, Ely
14:30

12 September 2009	Cambrian & Clydach Vale	4–0	Ammanford	King George New Field, Clydach Vale
14:30

12 September 2009	Corus Steel	0–1	Garden Village	Corus Sports Ground, Margam

12 September 2009	Croesyceiliog	1–0	Risca United	Woodland Road, Croesyceiliog
14:30

12 September 2009	Cwmaman Institute	1–7	Cwmbran Celtic	Canolfan Cwmaman, Cwmaman
14:30

12 September 2009	Goytre United	3 –1	Pentwyn Dynamo	Glehafod Park, Goytre
14:30

12 September 2009	Hay St Marys	2–1 (a.e.t.)	Dinas Powys	Breacon Road, Hereford
14:30

12 September 2009	Llantwit Fardre	0–1	Aberbargoed Buds	Tonteg Park, Tonteg
14:30

12 September 2009	Newcastle Emlyn	1–2	AFC Llwydcoed	Parc Emlyn, Newcastle Emlyn
14:30

12 September 2009	Penrhiwceiber Rangers	3–1	Caerleon	Glasbrook Terrace, Penrhiwceiber
14:30

12 September 2009	Pontardawe Town	4–1	Presteigne St. Andrews	The Recreation Ground, Pontardawe
14:30

12 September 2009	Pontyclun	7–2	Goytre	Ivor Park, Ponyclun
14:30

12 September 2009	Pontypridd Town	3–0	Newport Civil Service	Ynysangharad War Memorial Park, Pontypridd
14:30

12 September 2009	Porthcawl Town	2–4	Ton Pentre	Lock Lane, Porthcawl
14:30

12 September 2009	Seven Sisters	0–7	Afan Lido	Welfare Ground, Neath
14:30

12 September 2009	South Gower	0–5	Caldicot Town	South Gower Sports Ground, Scurlage
14:30

12 September 2009	Treharris Athletic Western	3–4	Cardiff Bay Harlequins	Athletic Ground, Treharris
14:30

12 September 2009	Troedyrhiw	2–1	Abertillery Bluebirds	The Willows, Merthyr Tydfil
14:30

12 September 2009	West End	6–6 (a.e.t.) (2–4 p)	Taff's Well	Pryderi Park, Swansea
14:30

Source: FAW Welsh Cup

== Second round ==
=== North ===
3 October 2009	Bangor City	4–1	Elements Cefn Druids	Farrar Road Stadium, Bangor
14:30	Jamie Reed 87', Jamie Brewerton 57', Chris Sharp 81'	Report	Jon Rush	Attendance: 502; Referee: Bryn Markham Jones

3 October 2009	Bala Town	8–1	Borras Park Albion
14:30

3 October 2009	Conwy United	0–2 (a.e.t.)	The New Saints
14:30

3 October 2009	Flint Town United	7–1	Barmouth & Dyffryn United	Court Road, Wrexham
14:30

3 October 2009	Connah's Quay Nomads	2–0	Pwllheli
14:30

3 October 2009	Gresford Athletic	2–3	Llanrug United
14:30

3 October 2009	Holyhead Hotspur	1–1 (a.e.t.) (4–3 p)	Newtown
14:30

3 October 2009	Lex XI	1–3	Airbus UK	Pant Newydd, Halkyn
14:30

3 October 2009	Llandudno	3–0	Berriew
14:30

3 October 2009	Llanfairpwll	1–3	Rhyl	The Flyover, Llandudno Junction
14:30

3 October 2009	Llangefni Town	1–2	Llandudno Junction	Leisure Centre, Pwllheli
14:30

3 October 2009	Llangollen Town	1–0	Glan Conwy
14:30

3 October 2009	Llansantffraid Village	1–2	Coedpoeth United
14:30

3 October 2009	Penrhyncoch	0–1	CPD Porthmadog
14:30

3 October 2009	Ruthin Town	1–2	Caersws
14:30

3 October 2009	Rhydymwyn	1–0	Caernarfon Town
14:30

3 October 2009	Technogroup Welshpool Town	2–3	Prestatyn Town
14:30

Source: FAW Welsh Cup

=== South ===
3 October 2009	Aberaman Athletic	3–2	Penrhiwceiber Rangers
14:30

3 October 2009	Afan Lido	5–1	Croesyceiliog
14:30

3 October 2009	Bridgend Town	2–0	Ton Pentre
14:30

3 October 2009	Bryntirion Athletic	0–3	Aberystwyth Town	Court Road, Wrexham
14:30

3 October 2009	Caerau (Ely)	5–1	Hay St Marys
14:30

3 October 2009	Cambrian & Clydach Vale	3–1	Troedyrhiw
14:30

3 October 2009	Cardiff Bay Harlequins	3–2	Aberbargoed Buds
14:30

3 October 2009	Carmarthen Town	4–1	Pontypridd Town	Pant Newydd, Halkyn
14:30

3 October 2009	Ely Rangers	3–2	AFC Llwydcoed
14:30

3 October 2009	Garden Village	2–6 (a.e.t.)	Caldicot Town	The Flyover, Llandudno Junction
14:30

3 October 2009	Goytre United	0–3	Pontardawe Town	Leisure Centre, Pwllheli
14:30

3 October 2009	Llangeinor	2–1 (a.e.t.)	Pontyclun
14:30

3 October 2009	Neath Athletic	2–2 (a.e.t.) (2–3 p)	Llanelli
14:30

3 October 2009	Port Talbot Town	5–0	Cwmbran Celtic
14:30

3 October 2009	Taff's Well	0–2	Haverfordwest County
14:30

Source: FAW Welsh Cup

== Third round ==
31 October 2009	Aberaman Athletic	2–0	Ely Rangers
14:00

31 October 2009	Bala Town	1–0	Llanrug United
14:00

31 October 2009	Caerau (Ely)	1–2	Afan Lido
14:00

31 October 2009	Caersws	4–1	Coedpoeth United
14:00

31 October 2009	Caldicot Town	0–3	Port Talbot Town
14:00

31 October 2009	Cambrian & Clydach Vale	0–2	The New Saints
14:00

31 October 2009	CPD Porthmadog	3–1	Rhydymwyn
14:00

31 October 2009	Flint Town United	0–1	Bangor City	Cae-y-Castell, Flint
14:00		Report	Peter Hoy 36'	Attendance: 627; Referee: Huw Jones

31 October 2009	Connah's Quay Nomads	3–2 (a.e.t.)	Airbus UK
14:00

31 October 2009	Haverfordwest County	1–2	Aberystwyth Town
14:00

31 October 2009	Llanelli	3–1	Carmarthen Town
14:00

31 October 2009	Llangeinor	1–6	Holyhead Hotspur
14:00

31 October 2009	Llangollen Town	1–3	Llandudno Junction
14:300

31 October 2009	Pontardawe Town	2–0	Llandudno
14:00

31 October 2009	Prestatyn Town	3–0	Cardiff Bay Harlequins
14:00

31 October 2009	Rhyl	4–2	Bridgend Town
14:00

Source: FAW Welsh Cup

== Fourth round ==
30 January 2010	Aberystwyth Town	0–2	Port Talbot Town
14:00

30 January 2010	Afan Lido	2–1 (a.e.t.)	Connah's Quay Nomads
14:00

30 January 2010	Bala Town	2–0	Caersws
14:00

30 January 2010	Bangor City	3–1	Aberaman Athletic
14:00

30 January 2010	Llandudno Junction	0–6	The New Saints
14:00

30 January 2010	Llanelli	4–0	Holyhead Hotspur
14:00

30 January 2010	Prestatyn Town	1–0	CPD Porthmadog
14:00

Rhyl	7–0	Pontardawe Town

Source: FAW Welsh Cup

== Quarter finals ==
27 February 2010	Bala Town	2–0 (a.e.t.)	Afan Lido
14:30	0–0

27 February 2010	Bangor City	2–0	Llanelli	Farrar Road Stadium
17:15	Reed 6' (pen.); Morley 90'			Attendance: 820; Referee: Mark Whitby

27 February 2010	Prestatyn Town	4–4 (a.e.t.) (5–3 p)	Rhyl
14:30

27 February 2010	The New Saints	2–2 (a.e.t.) (3–4 p)	Port Talbot Town
14:30

Source: FAW Welsh Cup

== Semi finals ==
10 April 2010
14:30

Bala Town	0–1	Port Talbot Town
		McCreesh 33'

Park Avenue, Aberystwyth

11 April 2010
13:15

Bangor City	2–0	Prestatyn Town
Smyth 11'; Garside 43'

Latham Park, Newtown
Attendance: 715
Referee: Ceri Richards

== Final ==
1 May 2010
16:30

Port Talbot Town	2–3	Bangor City
Fahiya 57'; McCreesh 85'	Report	Hunt 6'; Reed 15'; Morley 90+1'

Parc y Scarlets, Llanelli
Attendance: 1,303
Referee: Dean John (Wales)
