= 2006–07 Welsh Alliance League =

Welsh Alliance League
- Season: 2006–07
- Champions: Denbigh Town
- Relegated: Caerwys
- Matches played: 210
- Goals scored: 858 (4.09 per match)
- All statistics correct as of 24 February 2019.

The 2006–07 Welsh Alliance League is the 23rd season of the Welsh Alliance League, which is in the third level of the Welsh football pyramid.

The league consists of fifteen teams and concluded with Denbigh Town as champions and promoted to the Cymru Alliance. Bottom team Caerwys was relegated to the Clwyd League.

== Teams ==
Prestatyn Town were champions in the previous season. They were replaced by Halkyn United and Holywell Town who were relegated from the Cymru Alliance and Gwynedd League champions Pwllheli.

Locations of the teams of the 2006–07 Welsh Alliance League

=== Grounds and locations ===
Team	Location	Ground
Bethesda Athletic	Bethesda	Parc Meurig
Caerwys	Caerwys	Lon yr Ysgol
Conwy United	Conwy	Y Morfa Stadium
Denbigh Town	Denbigh	Central Park.
Glan Conwy	Glan Conwy	Cae Ffwt
Halkyn United	Halkyn	Pant Newydd
Holywell Town	Holywell	Halkyn Road
Llanberis	Llanberis	Ffordd Padarn
Llandudno Junction F.C.	Llandudno Junction	Arriva Ground
Llanrug United	Llanrug	Eithin Duon
Llanrwst United	Llanrwst	Gwydir Park
Nefyn United	Nefyn	Cae'r Delyn
Pwllheli	Pwllheli	Leisure Centre, Recreation Road
Rhydymwyn	Rhydymwyn	Dolfechlas Road
Rhyl Reserves	Rhyl	Belle Vue

== League table ==
Pos	Team	Pld	W	D	L	GF	GA	GD	Pts	Promotion or relegation
1	Denbigh Town (C, P)	28	23	2	3	82	23	+59	71	Promotion to Cymru Alliance
2	Rhyl Reserves	28	21	5	2	81	29	+52	68	
3	Llanrwst United	28	17	4	7	56	36	+20	55	
4	Glan Conwy	28	16	6	6	52	36	+16	54	
5	Pwllheli	28	14	5	9	78	46	+32	47	
6	Bethesda Athletic	28	13	7	8	69	50	+19	46	
7	Llanrug United	28	10	10	8	68	45	+23	40	
8	Rhydymwyn	28	11	6	11	57	53	+4	39	
9	Conwy United	28	11	4	13	58	70	−12	37	
10	Holywell Town	28	8	8	12	59	63	−4	32	
11	Nefyn United	28	9	2	17	41	61	−20	29	
12	Llandudno Junction	28	7	4	17	44	80	−36	25	
13	Llanberis	28	5	7	16	46	68	−22	22	
14	Halkyn United	28	6	2	20	28	74	−46	20	
15	Caerwys (R)	28	3	0	25	39	124	−85	9	Relegation to Clwyd League

Source: Welsh Football Data Archive
Rules for classification: 1) Points; 2) Goal difference; 3) Goals scored; 4) Matches won; 5) Play-off.
(C) Champions; (P) Promoted; (R) Relegated
