= 2000–01 Welsh Alliance League =

Welsh Alliance League
- Season: 2000–01
- Champions: Llanfairpwll
- Matches: 182
- Goals: 821 (4.51 per match)

The 2000–01 Welsh Alliance League is the 17th season of the Welsh Alliance League, which is in the third level of the Welsh football pyramid.

The league consists of fourteen teams and concluded with Llanfairpwll as champions and promoted to the Cymru Alliance.

== Teams ==
Halkyn United were champions in the previous season and were promoted to the Cymru Alliance.

Llandyrnog United were relegated to the Clwyd League and replaced by Gwynedd League champions, Bethesda Athletic and Clwyd League champions, Abergele Town.

Locations of the teams of the 2000–01 Welsh Alliance League

=== Grounds and locations ===
Team	Location	Ground
Abergele Town	Llandudno	Maesdu Park
Amlwch Town	Amlwch	Lôn Bach
Bangor City Reserves	Bangor	Farrar Road Stadium
Bethesda Athletic	Bethesda	Parc Meurig
Caerwys	Caerwys	Lon yr Ysgol
Colwyn Bay YMCA	Colwyn Bay	
Conwy United	Conwy	Y Morfa Stadium
Glan Conwy	Glan Conwy	Cae Ffwt
Llandudno Junction	Llandudno Junction	Arriva Ground
Llanfairpwll	Llanfairpwllgwyngyll	Maes Eilian
Locomotive Llanberis	Llanberis	Ffordd Padarn
Penmaenmawr Phoenix	Penmaenmawr	Cae Sling
Prestatyn Town	Prestatyn	Bastion Road
Rhyl Reserves	Rhyl	Belle Vue

== League table ==
Pos	Team	Pld	W	D	L	GF	GA	GD	Pts	Promotion or relegation
1	Llanfairpwll (C, P)	26	18	4	4	75	38	+37	58	Promotion to Cymru Alliance
2	Glan Conwy	26	18	2	6	92	49	+43	56	
3	Amlwch Town	26	16	4	6	91	41	+50	52	
4	Bethesda Athletic	26	12	8	6	64	45	+19	44	
5	Rhyl Reserves	26	13	4	9	50	52	−2	43	
6	Prestatyn Town	26	12	4	10	48	56	−8	40	
7	Abergele Town	26	11	6	9	58	52	+6	39	
8	Bangor City Reserves	26	9	6	11	48	55	−7	33	
9	Llandudno Junction	26	8	6	12	69	71	−2	30	
10	Colwyn Bay YMCA	26	9	2	15	48	62	−14	29	
11	Locomotive Llanberis	26	8	4	14	50	56	−6	28	
12	Caerwys	26	4	9	13	35	68	−33	21	
13	Conwy United	26	4	8	14	38	86	−48	20	
14	Penmaenmawr Phoenix	26	4	5	17	55	90	−35	17	

Source: Welsh Football Data Archive and Seasiders' Attic
Rules for classification: 1) Points; 2) Goal difference; 3) Goals scored; 4) Matches won; 5) Play-off.
(C) Champions; (P) Promoted
