= 2003–04 Welsh Alliance League =

Welsh Alliance League
- Season: 2003–04
- Champions: Rhyl Reserves
- Matches: 240
- Goals: 981 (4.09 per match)

The 2003–04 Welsh Alliance League is the 20th season of the Welsh Alliance League, which is in the third level of the Welsh football pyramid.

The league consists of sixteen teams and concluded with Rhyl Reserves as champions. Runners-up, Llandyrnog United were promoted to the Cymru Alliance.

== Teams ==
Glantraeth were champions in the previous season and were promoted to the Cymru Alliance. They were replaced by Gwynedd League champions Llanrug United and Clwyd League runners-up, Llandyrnog United.

Locations of the teams of the 2003–04 Welsh Alliance League

=== Grounds and locations ===
Team	Location	Ground
Bethesda Athletic	Bethesda	Parc Meurig
Bodedern Athletic	Bodedern	Cae Ty Cristion
Caerwys	Caerwys	Lon yr Ysgol
Conwy United	Conwy	Y Morfa Stadium
Denbigh Town	Denbigh	Central Park.
Glan Conwy	Glan Conwy	Cae Ffwt
Llandudno Junction F.C.	Llandudno Junction	Arriva Ground
Llandyrnog United	Llandyrnog	Cae Nant
Llanrug United	Llanrug	Eithin Duon
Locomotive Llanberis	Llanberis	Ffordd Padarn
Penmaenmawr Phoenix	Penmaenmawr	Cae Sling
Prestatyn Town	Prestatyn	Bastion Road
Rhydymwyn	Rhydymwyn	Dolfechlas Road
Rhyl Reserves	Rhyl	Belle Vue
Sealand Leisure	Sealand	
Y Felinheli	Y Felinheli	Cae Selio

== League table ==
Pos	Team	Pld	W	D	L	GF	GA	GD	Pts	Promotion or relegation
1	Rhyl Reserves (C)	30	26	2	2	101	27	+74	80	
2	Llandyrnog United (P)	30	22	1	7	77	35	+42	67	Promotion to Cymru Alliance
3	Prestatyn Town	30	21	3	6	72	28	+44	66	
4	Bodedern	30	19	7	4	71	24	+47	64	
5	Rhydymwyn	30	19	1	10	73	35	+38	58	
6	Bethesda Athletic	30	13	7	10	58	60	−2	46	
7	Locomotive Llanberis	30	12	6	12	75	59	+16	42	
8	Glan Conwy	30	13	3	14	49	54	−5	42	
9	Sealand Leisure	30	10	9	11	59	58	+1	39	
10	Llanrug United	30	12	3	15	55	69	−14	39	
11	Llandudno Junction	30	12	1	17	69	62	+7	37	
12	Denbigh Town	30	11	3	16	62	66	−4	36	
13	Conwy United	30	8	1	21	44	89	−45	25	
14	Penmaenmawr Phoenix	30	7	4	19	51	106	−55	25	
15	Caerwys	30	3	5	22	32	105	−73	14	
16	Y Felinheli	30	4	0	26	33	104	−71	12	

Source: Welsh Football Data Archive
Rules for classification: 1) Points; 2) Goal difference; 3) Goals scored; 4) Matches won; 5) Play-off.
(C) Champions; (P) Promoted
