= 2007–08 Welsh Alliance League =

Welsh Alliance League
- Season: 2007–08
- Champions: Bethesda Athletic
- Matches played: 210
- Goals scored: 858 (4.09 per match)
- All statistics correct as of 24 February 2019.

The 2007–08 Welsh Alliance League, known as the design2print Welsh Alliance League for sponsorship reasons, is the 24th season of the Welsh Alliance League, which is in the third level of the Welsh football pyramid.

The league consists of fifteen teams and concluded with Bethesda Athletic as champions.

== Teams ==
Denbigh Town were champions in the previous season. Gwynedd League's second place team Amlwch Town and third place team Nantlle Vale were promoted to the Welsh Alliance League

Locations of the teams of the 2007–08 Welsh Alliance League

=== Grounds and locations ===
Team	Location	Ground
Amlwch Town	Amlwch	Lôn Bach
Bethesda Athletic	Bethesda	Parc Meurig
Conwy United	Conwy	Y Morfa Stadium
Glan Conwy	Glan Conwy	Cae Ffwt
Halkyn United	Halkyn	Pant Newydd
Holywell Town	Holywell	Halkyn Road
Llanberis	Llanberis	Ffordd Padarn
Llandudno Junction F.C.	Llandudno Junction	Arriva Ground
Llanrug United	Llanrug	Eithin Duon
Llanrwst United	Llanrwst	Gwydir Park
Nantlle Vale	Penygroes	Maes Dulyn
Nefyn United	Nefyn	Cae'r Delyn
Pwllheli	Pwllheli	Leisure Centre, Recreation Road
Rhydymwyn	Rhydymwyn	Dolfechlas Road
Rhyl Reserves	Rhyl	Belle Vue

== League table ==
Pos	Team	Pld	W	D	L	GF	GA	GD	Pts
1	Bethesda Athletic (C)	28	23	2	3	104	26	+78	71
2	Glan Conwy	28	19	3	6	77	32	+45	60
3	Rhyl Reserves	28	14	5	9	74	40	+34	47
4	Llanrwst United	28	14	4	10	50	45	+5	46
5	Conwy United	28	14	3	11	69	58	+11	45
6	Llanrug United	28	12	8	8	78	65	+13	44
7	Pwllheli	28	11	7	10	53	57	−4	40
8	Nantlle Vale	28	11	5	12	41	60	−19	38
9	Llanberis	28	8	9	11	47	58	−11	33
10	Nefyn United (Note: Nefyn United were deducted three points.)	28	10	4	14	48	68	−20	31
11	Rhydymwyn	28	8	5	15	48	54	−6	29
12	Holywell Town (Note: Holywell Town were deducted three points.)	28	8	6	14	44	70	−26	27
13	Amlwch Town	28	6	7	15	50	80	−30	25
14	Halkyn United	28	6	7	15	37	68	−31	25
15	Llandudno Junction	28	6	5	17	38	77	−39	23

Source: Welsh Football Data Archive
Rules for classification: 1) Points; 2) Goal difference; 3) Goals scored; 4) Matches won; 5) Play-off.
(C) Champions
