= 2008–09 Welsh Alliance League =

Welsh Alliance League
- Season: 2008–09
- Champions: Bethesda Athletic
- Matches played: 272
- Goals scored: 1,231 (4.53 per match)
- All statistics correct as of 24 February 2019.

The 2008–09 Welsh Alliance League, known as the design2print Welsh Alliance League for sponsorship reasons, is the 25th season of the Welsh Alliance League, which is in the third level of the Welsh football pyramid.

The league consists of seventeen teams and concluded with Bethesda Athletic as champions and promoted to the Cymru Alliance.

== Teams ==
Bethesda Athletic were champions in the previous season. Gwynedd League champions Llanllyfni and runners-up Barmouth & Dyffryn United were promoted to the Welsh Alliance League

Locations of the teams of the 2008–09 Welsh Alliance League

=== Grounds and locations ===
Team	Location	Ground
Amlwch Town	Amlwch	Lôn Bach
Barmouth & Dyffryn United	Barmouth	Wern Mynach
Bethesda Athletic	Bethesda	Parc Meurig
Conwy United	Conwy	Y Morfa Stadium
Glan Conwy	Glan Conwy	Cae Ffwt
Halkyn United	Halkyn	Pant Newydd
Holywell Town	Holywell	Halkyn Road
Llanberis	Llanberis	Ffordd Padarn
Llandudno Junction F.C.	Llandudno Junction	Arriva Ground
Llanllyfni	Llanllyfni	Cae Brenin Sior V
Llanrug United	Llanrug	Eithin Duon
Llanrwst United	Llanrwst	Gwydir Park
Nantlle Vale	Penygroes	Maes Dulyn
Nefyn United	Nefyn	Cae'r Delyn
Pwllheli	Pwllheli	Leisure Centre, Recreation Road
Rhydymwyn	Rhydymwyn	Dolfechlas Road
Rhyl Reserves	Rhyl	Belle Vue

== League table ==
Pos	Team	Pld	W	D	L	GF	GA	GD	Pts	Promotion or relegation
1	Bethesda Athletic (C, P)	32	27	1	4	146	35	+111	82	Promotion to Cymru Alliance
2	Rhydymwyn (Note: Rhydymwyn were deducted three points.)	32	20	6	6	83	45	+38	63	
3	Rhyl Reserves	32	19	4	9	82	43	+39	61	
4	Llanrwst United	32	19	4	9	76	45	+31	61	
5	Glan Conwy	32	19	3	10	106	53	+53	60	
6	Llandudno Junction	32	17	5	10	86	54	+32	56	
7	Nefyn United	32	16	6	10	65	58	+7	54	
8	Llanrug United	32	16	4	12	84	66	+18	52	
9	Pwllheli	32	16	4	12	59	54	+5	52	
10	Barmouth & Dyffryn United	32	14	5	13	85	71	+14	47	
11	Halkyn United (Note: Halkyn United were deducted three points.)	32	15	3	14	79	79	0	45	
12	Conwy United (Note: Conwy United were deducted three points.)	32	12	4	16	63	64	−1	37	
13	Llanllyfni	32	11	4	17	62	89	−27	37	
14	Holywell Town	32	10	3	19	64	80	−16	33	
15	Llanberis	32	7	5	20	40	82	−42	26	
16	Amlwch Town	32	0	2	30	20	190	−170	2	
17	Nantlle Vale (Note: Nantlle Vale were deducted six points.)	32	1	3	28	31	123	−92	0	

Source: Welsh Football Data Archive
Rules for classification: 1) Points; 2) Goal difference; 3) Goals scored; 4) Matches won; 5) Play-off.
(C) Champions; (P) Promoted
