= 2017–18 Welsh Alliance League =

Welsh Alliance League
- Season: 2017–18
- Dates: 12 August 2017 – 26 May 2018
- Champions: Division 1 – Conwy Borough; Division 2 – Prestatyn Sports
- Relegated: Division 1 – Pwllheli & Trearddur Bay; Division 2 – Llanfairpwll
- Matches: 392
- Goals: 1,780 (4.54 per match)
- Biggest home win: Division 1 Greenfield 12–1 Pwllheli (2 December 2017); Division 2 Prestatyn Sports 9–0 Llanfairpwll (7 May 2018)
- Biggest away win: Division 1 Llanberis 0–8 Conwy Borough (12 August 2017); Division 2 Llanfairpwll 0–10 Prestatyn Sports (9 September 2017)
- Highest attendance: 1,002 – Division 1 Nantlle Vale 2–1 Llandudno Albion (5 May 2018); 454 – Division 2 Penmaenmawr Phoenix 7–0 Blaenau Ffestiniog Amateur (26 April 2018)
- All statistics correct as of 26 February 2019.

The 2017–18 Welsh Alliance League, known as the Lock Stock Welsh Alliance League for sponsorship reasons, is the 34th season of the Welsh Alliance League, which consists of two divisions: the third and fourth levels of the Welsh football pyramid.

There are fifteen teams in each division, with the champions of Division 1 promoted to the Cymru Alliance and the bottom two relegated to Division 2. In Division 2, the champions and runners-up are promoted to Division 1, with the bottom two relegated to either the Gwynedd League or the Vale of Clwyd and Conwy Football League.

The season began on 12 August 2017 and concluded on 26 May 2018.

== Division 1 ==
=== Teams ===
Glantraeth were champions in the previous season and were promoted to the Cymru Alliance. They were replaced by Conwy Borough who were relegated from the Cymru Alliance.

The bottom two teams from the previous season, Llanrwst United and Glan Conwy, were relegated to Division 2 for 2017–18. Division 2 champions, Llandudno Albion and runners-up, Mynydd Llandegai were promoted in their place.

Locations of the Division 1 teams of the 2017–18 Welsh Alliance League

==== Grounds and locations ====
| Team | Location | Ground |
|---|---|---|
| Barmouth & Dyffryn United | Barmouth | Wern Mynach |
| Conwy Borough F.C. | Conwy | Y Morfa Stadium |
| Greenfield | Greenfield | Bagillt Road |
| Llanberis | Llanberis | Ffordd Padarn |
| Llandudno Albion | Llandudno | Ffordd Dwyfor |
| Llandyrnog United | Llandyrnog | Cae Nant |
| Llangefni Town | Llangefni | Bob Parry Field |
| Llanrug United | Llanrug | Eithin Duon |
| Llanrwst United | Llanrwst | Gwydir Park |
| Mynydd Llandegai | Mynydd Llandygai | Mynydd Llandegai |
| Nantlle Vale | Penygroes | Maes Dulyn |
| Penrhyndeudraeth | Penrhyndeudraeth | Maes Y Parc |
| Pwllheli | Pwllheli | Leisure Centre, Recreation Road |
| St Asaph City | St Asaph | Roe Plas |
| Trearddur Bay | Trearddur | Lon Isallt |

=== League table ===
| Pos | Team | Pld | W | D | L | GF | GA | GD | Pts | Promotion or relegation |
|---|---|---|---|---|---|---|---|---|---|---|
| 1 | Conwy Borough (C, P) | 28 | 20 | 4 | 4 | 107 | 37 | +70 | 64 | Promotion to Cymru Alliance |
| 2 | Llangefni Town | 28 | 19 | 4 | 5 | 68 | 25 | +43 | 61 | |
| 3 | Llanrug United | 28 | 12 | 12 | 4 | 64 | 51 | +13 | 48 | |
| 4 | Llanberis | 28 | 14 | 4 | 10 | 43 | 55 | −12 | 46 | |
| 5 | Greenfield (Note: Greenfield were deducted three points for playing an ineligible player.) | 28 | 14 | 5 | 9 | 82 | 53 | +29 | 44 | |
| 6 | Llanrwst United | 28 | 12 | 8 | 8 | 63 | 54 | +9 | 44 | |
| 7 | Llandudno Albion (Note: Llandudno Albion were deducted three points for non fulfilment of fixture.) | 28 | 13 | 6 | 9 | 76 | 52 | +24 | 42 | |
| 8 | Penrhyndeudraeth | 28 | 11 | 5 | 12 | 55 | 49 | +6 | 38 | |
| 9 | Barmouth & Dyffryn United | 28 | 12 | 2 | 14 | 38 | 49 | −11 | 38 | |
| 10 | Mynydd Llandegai | 28 | 10 | 5 | 13 | 57 | 72 | −15 | 35 | |
| 11 | Llandyrnog United | 28 | 8 | 6 | 14 | 51 | 63 | −12 | 30 | |
| 12 | St Asaph City | 28 | 7 | 8 | 13 | 49 | 60 | −11 | 29 | |
| 13 | Nantlle Vale | 28 | 6 | 5 | 17 | 32 | 74 | −42 | 23 | |
| 14 | Trearddur Bay (R) | 28 | 7 | 1 | 20 | 42 | 83 | −41 | 22 | Relegation to Division 2 |
| 15 | Pwllheli (R) | 28 | 6 | 3 | 19 | 47 | 97 | −50 | 21 | Relegation to Division 2 |

Source: Welsh Alliance League, NonLeagueMatters
Rules for classification: 1) Points; 2) Goal difference; 3) Goals scored; 4) Matches won; 5) Play-off.
(C) Champions; (P) Promoted; (R) Relegated

=== Results ===
| Home \ Away | BDU | CON | GRE | LNB | LNA | LLD | LLG | LRU | LRW | MYN | NAN | PEN | PWL | STA | TRE |
|---|---|---|---|---|---|---|---|---|---|---|---|---|---|---|---|
| Barmouth & Dyffryn United | — | 3–5 | 1–3 | 0–1 | 2–1 | 2–2 | 0–0 | 1–3 | 1–2 | 4–0 | 1–0 | 0–4 | 2–1 | 2–1 | 3–1 |
| Conwy Borough | 2–1 | — | 4–1 | 5–1 | 1–4 | 2–2 | 1–2 | 2–2 | 1–2 | 8–1 | 2–2 | 2–1 | 8–1 | 3–3 | 11–0 |
| Greenfield | 0–1 | 0–2 | — | 0–4 | 1–0 | 1–4 | 1–2 | 2–2 | 5–4 | 1–1 | 6–1 | 6–2 | 12–1 | 4–0 | 6–0 |
| Llanberis | 1–0 | 0–8 | 2–1 | — | 2–1 | 4–1 | 0–4 | 1–2 | 2–2 | 0–1 | 2–0 | 0–0 | 3–0 | 2–0 | 3–2 |
| Llandudno Albion | 2–0 | 2–6 | 5–5 | 8–1 | — | 2–0 | 1–1 | 2–2 | 4–1 | 5–1 | 8–0 | 1–0 | 4–1 | 1–1 | 2–1 |
| Llandyrnog United | 0–1 | 1–4 | 1–3 | 1–4 | 2–4 | — | 3–2 | 0–1 | 0–1 | 0–4 | 5–1 | 3–3 | 4–1 | 2–3 | 1–0 |
| Llangefni Town | 1–3 | 1–2 | 4–2 | 4–0 | 4–1 | 2–1 | — | 1–1 | 2–0 | 4–0 | 0–1 | 2–0 | 8–0 | 3–0 | 2–1 |
| Llanrug United | 5–1 | 2–3 | 1–1 | 1–1 | 3–1 | 3–3 | 3–2 | — | 3–3 | 5–3 | 2–1 | 1–1 | 3–3 | 2–2 | 1–3 |
| Llanrwst United | 3–1 | 1–4 | 5–1 | 0–0 | 3–1 | 4–1 | 1–2 | 4–4 | — | 2–4 | 4–1 | 0–2 | 1–1 | 1–0 | 4–4 |
| Mynydd Llandegai | 1–2 | 1–4 | 2–2 | 3–1 | 7–4 | 3–3 | 0–2 | 2–0 | 5–3 | — | 1–1 | 2–3 | 1–5 | 2–3 | 2–3 |
| Nantlle Vale | 0–3 | 2–1 | 1–6 | 0–1 | 2–1 | 1–3 | 0–2 | 1–2 | 1–1 | 0–1 | — | 0–4 | 4–4 | 1–1 | 2–0 |
| Penrhyndeudraeth | 1–2 | 0–2 | 2–3 | 2–3 | 2–2 | 4–0 | 1–3 | 3–0 | 2–2 | 0–3 | 6–0 | — | 3–2 | 3–1 | 2–1 |
| Pwllheli | 1–0 | 1–5 | 0–2 | 5–1 | 0–3 | 1–2 | 2–5 | 1–3 | 1–2 | 1–3 | 4–6 | 4–0 | — | 2–0 | 2–1 |
| St Asaph City | 5–1 | 0–5 | 1–4 | 2–0 | 2–2 | 2–2 | 0–0 | 2–4 | 1–4 | 2–2 | 3–0 | 1–2 | 5–1 | — | 7–3 |
| Trearddur Bay | 3–0 | 0–4 | 0–3 | 2–3 | 1–4 | 0–4 | 0–3 | 1–3 | 0–3 | 4–1 | 0–3 | 3–2 | 6–1 | 2–1 | — |

Source: - NonLeagueMatters - Welsh Alliance League Division 1 - Results / Fixtures
Legend: Blue = home team win; Yellow = draw; Red = away team win.

== Division 2 ==
=== Teams ===
Llandudno Albion were champions in the previous season and were promoted to Division 1 along with runners-up, Mynydd Llandegai. They were replaced by Glan Conwy who were relegated from Division 1.

The bottom two teams from the previous season were Blaenau Ffestiniog Amateur and Llannerch-y-medd. However, both teams were not relegated. Gwynedd League champions, Bodedern Athletic, runners-up, Aberffraw and Vale of Clwyd and Conwy Football League Premier Division champions, Llannefydd were promoted to Division 2.

Locations of the Division 2 teams of the 2017–18 Welsh Alliance League

==== Grounds and locations ====
| Team | Location | Ground |
|---|---|---|
| Aberffraw | Aberffraw | Tŷ Croes |
| Amlwch Town | Amlwch | Lôn Bach |
| Blaenau Ffestiniog Amateur | Blaenau Ffestiniog | Cae Clyd |
| Bodedern Athletic | Bodedern | Cae Tŷ Cristion, Village Hall |
| Gaerwen | Gaerwen | Lôn Groes |
| Glan Conwy | Glan Conwy | Cae Ffwt |
| Llanfairpwll | Llanfairpwllgwyngyll | Maes Eilian |
| Llannefydd | Llannefydd | |
| Llannerch-y-medd | Llanerch-y-medd | Tan Parc |
| Meliden | Meliden | Ffordd Tŷ Newydd |
| Mochdre Sports | Mochdre | Swan Road |
| Penmaenmawr Phoenix | Penmaenmawr | Cae Sling |
| Pentraeth | Pentraeth | Bryniau Field |
| Prestatyn Sports | Prestatyn | Gronant Playing Fields |
| Y Felinheli | Y Felinheli | Cae Selio, Bangor Street |

=== League table ===
| Pos | Team | Pld | W | D | L | GF | GA | GD | Pts | Promotion or relegation |
|---|---|---|---|---|---|---|---|---|---|---|
| 1 | Prestatyn Sports (Note: Prestatyn Sports were deducted three points for playing a non registered player.) (C, P) | 28 | 24 | 3 | 1 | 117 | 30 | +87 | 72 | Promotion to Division 1 |
| 2 | Bodedern Athletic (P) | 28 | 21 | 1 | 6 | 78 | 41 | +37 | 64 | Promotion to Division 1 |
| 3 | Glan Conwy | 28 | 19 | 2 | 7 | 74 | 35 | +39 | 59 | |
| 4 | Llannefydd | 28 | 15 | 7 | 6 | 65 | 35 | +30 | 52 | |
| 5 | Amlwch Town | 28 | 16 | 4 | 8 | 66 | 47 | +19 | 52 | |
| 6 | Y Felinheli | 28 | 16 | 1 | 11 | 71 | 49 | +22 | 49 | |
| 7 | Meliden | 28 | 12 | 4 | 12 | 70 | 67 | +3 | 40 | |
| 8 | Gaerwen | 28 | 12 | 3 | 13 | 47 | 58 | −11 | 39 | |
| 9 | Aberffraw | 28 | 11 | 2 | 15 | 53 | 61 | −8 | 35 | |
| 10 | Penmaenmawr Phoenix | 28 | 10 | 4 | 14 | 58 | 59 | −1 | 34 | |
| 11 | Blaenau Ffestiniog Amateur | 28 | 9 | 4 | 15 | 70 | 98 | −28 | 31 | |
| 12 | Pentraeth | 28 | 8 | 4 | 16 | 40 | 67 | −27 | 28 | |
| 13 | Mochdre Sports | 28 | 7 | 3 | 18 | 53 | 84 | −31 | 24 | |
| 14 | Llannerch-y-medd | 28 | 4 | 2 | 22 | 19 | 78 | −59 | 14 | |
| 15 | Llanfairpwll (R) | 28 | 2 | 4 | 22 | 25 | 97 | −72 | 10 | Relegation to Anglesey League |

Source: Welsh Alliance League, NonLeagueMatters
Rules for classification: 1) Points; 2) Goal difference; 3) Goals scored; 4) Matches won; 5) Play-off.
(C) Champions; (P) Promoted; (R) Relegated

=== Results ===
| Home \ Away | ABF | AML | BFA | BOD | GAR | GLC | LPG | LLF | LYM | MEL | MOC | PHO | PEN | PRE | FEL |
|---|---|---|---|---|---|---|---|---|---|---|---|---|---|---|---|
| Aberffraw | — | 3–2 | 4–3 | 1–4 | 2–3 | 1–2 | 2–1 | 1–0 | 0–1 | 5–1 | 5–2 | 2–2 | 0–1 | 2–6 | 3–1 |
| Amlwch Town | 1–3 | — | 5–1 | 2–3 | 1–1 | 1–0 | 3–1 | 0–0 | 2–0 | 3–2 | 4–2 | 6–1 | 5–1 | 2–4 | 2–1 |
| Blaenau Ffestiniog Amateur | 6–2 | 4–5 | — | 4–3 | 1–3 | 2–2 | 1–1 | 2–1 | 0–1 | 7–6 | 3–3 | 5–5 | 3–1 | 1–8 | 2–3 |
| Bodedern Athletic | 1–0 | 5–3 | 2–0 | — | 5–0 | 2–1 | 4–1 | 4–2 | 2–0 | 3–1 | 4–1 | 6–2 | 2–1 | 4–4 | 4–0 |
| Gaerwen | 4–3 | 2–0 | 5–3 | 1–3 | — | 1–2 | 1–4 | 3–3 | 1–2 | 1–3 | 1–0 | 2–0 | 3–1 | 0–1 | 0–4 |
| Glan Conwy | 3–2 | 4–2 | 3–0 | 1–2 | 6–0 | — | 9–1 | 1–0 | 2–0 | 0–3 | 2–0 | 1–2 | 5–2 | 1–2 | 2–1 |
| Llanfairpwll | 0–1 | 1–1 | 1–5 | 0–3 | 0–3 | 2–4 | — | 0–4 | 1–1 | 1–3 | 3–4 | 0–4 | 0–1 | 0–10 | 0–4 |
| Llannefydd | 2–1 | 1–1 | 8–2 | 2–1 | 2–1 | 2–2 | 4–1 | — | 3–0 | 3–1 | 2–1 | 2–1 | 5–0 | 3–3 | 4–0 |
| Llannerch-y-medd | 0–4 | 0–1 | 1–3 | 2–4 | 0–2 | 1–3 | 1–0 | 0–0 | — | 0–6 | 3–5 | 0–6 | 1–2 | 0–3 | 0–5 |
| Meliden | 2–1 | 0–1 | 4–1 | 0–1 | 1–1 | 1–2 | 4–1 | 2–4 | 3–2 | — | 1–1 | 2–2 | 2–0 | 2–4 | 4–3 |
| Mochdre Sports | 5–2 | 2–3 | 2–5 | 0–3 | 1–2 | 1–5 | 2–2 | 1–2 | 4–0 | 4–6 | — | 3–2 | 2–0 | 1–6 | 0–4 |
| Penmaenmawr Phoenix | 1–2 | 0–3 | 7–0 | 1–0 | 2–3 | 0–2 | 1–2 | 2–1 | 3–1 | 1–3 | 3–2 | — | 2–0 | 0–1 | 1–2 |
| Pentraeth | 1–0 | 1–3 | 2–4 | 4–0 | 2–0 | 0–5 | 3–1 | 2–2 | 3–1 | 4–4 | 2–3 | 2–2 | — | 2–2 | 0–1 |
| Prestatyn Sports | 5–0 | 3–0 | 2–1 | 4–1 | 3–1 | 3–1 | 9–0 | 2–1 | 3–1 | 8–1 | 5–1 | 5–0 | 7–1 | — | 3–1 |
| Y Felinheli | 1–1 | 1–4 | 8–1 | 3–2 | 3–2 | 1–3 | 5–0 | 0–2 | 7–0 | 3–2 | 4–0 | 1–5 | 2–1 | 2–1 | — |

Source: - NonLeagueMatters - Welsh Alliance League Division 2 - Results / Fixtures
Legend: Blue = home team win; Yellow = draw; Red = away team win.
