= Conwy Borough F.C. =

Association football club in Conwy, Wales

Conwy Borough
- Full name: Conwy Borough Football Club
- Nickname: The Tangerines
- Founded: 1977; 49 years ago (as Conwy United)
- Ground: Y Morfa Stadium, Conwy
- Capacity: 2,500
- Coordinates: 53.287017°N 3.848169°W
- Manager: Ronnie Green
- League: North Wales Coast East Premier Division
- 2025–26: North Wales Coast East Premier Division, 5th of 12
- Website: http://www.conwyboroughfc.co.uk/
Home colours	Away colours

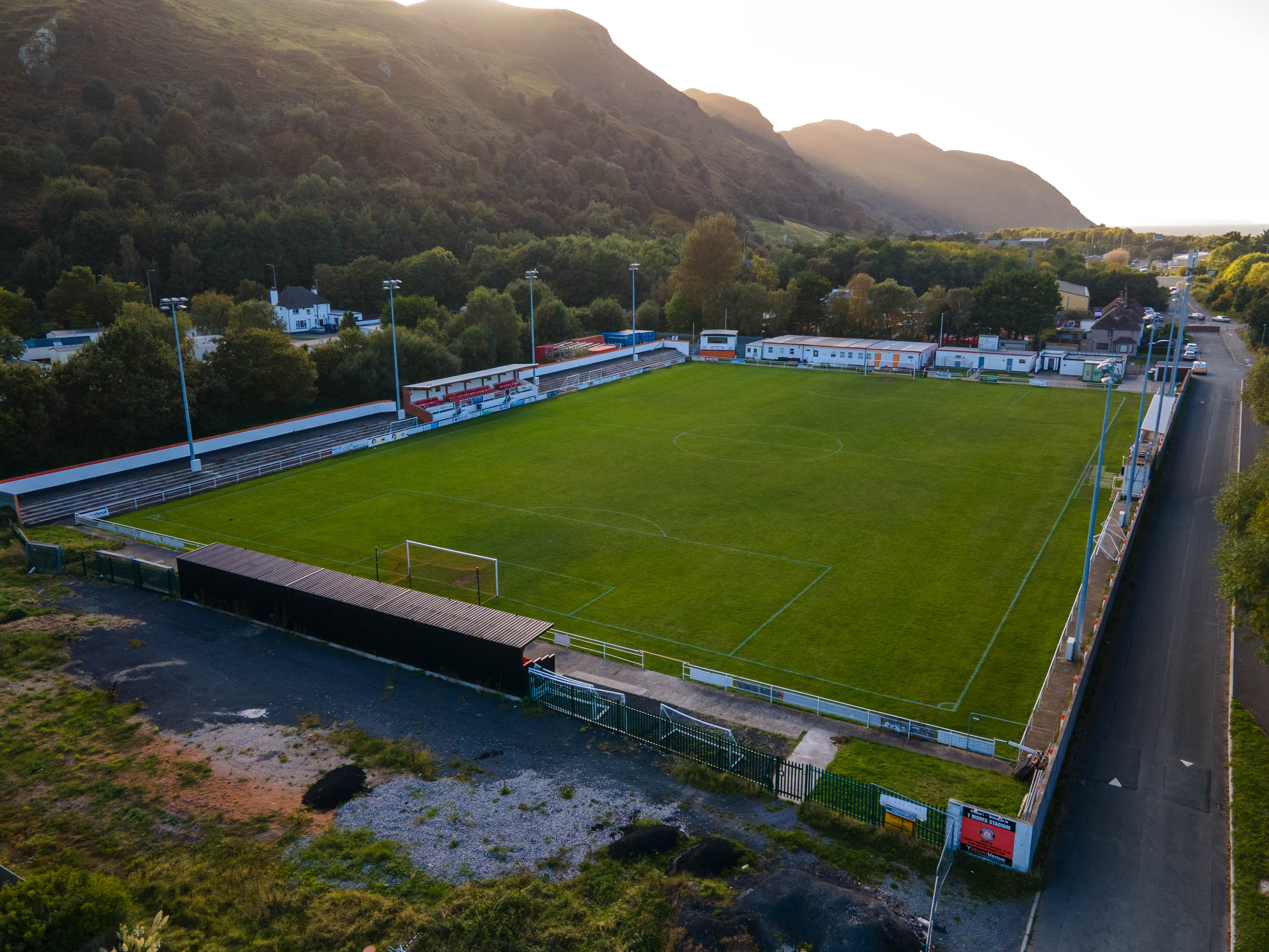
Y Morfa

Conwy Borough Football Club (Welsh: Clwb Pêl-droed Bwrdeistref Conwy) are a Welsh football club based in Conwy, playing in the North Wales Coast East Premier Division. Between 1977 and June 2012 they were known as Conwy United.

== Club history ==
Following the demise of Borough United in 1967, Welsh representatives in the European Cup Winners’ Cup in 1963–64, there was a void of Welsh League clubs in the Conwy area. Historically there has always been football in the area, and especially a Conwy team, stretching back to the 1870s. In 1977 Conwy Town and Conwy Royal British Legion, both of whom played in the Vale of Conwy League, amalgamated to form Conwy United.

The club was duly elected to the Welsh League (North) that later became the Welsh Alliance League. In 1981–82 the club won the Welsh Intermediate Cup (now called the FAW Welsh Trophy) and the club also won the Welsh Alliance League title in 1984–85 and 1985–86. In 1990 the club became founder members of the Cymru Alliance and finished in the top seven both seasons that they were members.

In 1992 the club became founder members of the League of Wales. The club finished a creditable seventh place in its first season and in 1995–96 finished in third place under the guidance of John Hulse, with Kenny McKenna setting a club scoring record of 49 goals in a season. The club qualified for the 1996 UEFA Intertoto Cup and played Charleroi (Belgium) and SV Ried (Austria) at the Racecourse Ground, Wrexham, and travelled to Zaglebie Lubin (Poland) and Silkeborg (Denmark). Despite not progressing past the group stage, the club gave a good account of itself especially with a 0–0 draw against Charleroi and losing to a late goal against SV Ried.

In the following three seasons the club reached the semi-finals of the Welsh Cup twice, and also qualified for the FAW Premier Cup twice, most notably holding Swansea City to 0–0 draw at the Vetch Field. However the financial burden had begun to take its toll on the club and in 2000 were relegated.

The club decided not to progress to the Cymru Alliance for financial reasons and instead accepted an invitation to join the Welsh Alliance League. In its second season the club was League runners-up and Cookson Cup runners-up. The following two seasons were very difficult both on and off the field but the return of Nigel Roberts as manager kept the club up and the 2004–05 season started tremendously well with the club sitting at the top of the League. However, tragedy struck when Roberts was killed in a road accident. The league slipped just out of reach but under the guidance of Danny McGoona reached the final of the Cookson Cup again, only to lose out 4–3 to Bethesda in one of the most dramatic finals for years.

In the 2009–10 season under the management of Barry Jones and Keith Tansley a young Conwy side finally clinched the Cookson Cup. An extra time penalty from Matty Bennett won the trophy against rivals Llandudno Junction at Maesdu. In the league the club finished sixth.

The following season Paul Moroney took over as Manager with Barry Jones and Keith Tansley remaining at the club. The 2010–11 season turned out to be one of the most successful seasons of the clubs recent history. Although losing the first game of the season away at Denbigh, Moroney's side went on to win the Welsh Alliance Division One and gain promotion to the Cymru Alliance. Conwy also reached the final of the FAW Trophy (held at Belle Vue)) where they led by two goals to nil until the 91st minute and somehow conceded three goals in as many minutes to gift Holywell Town the Trophy in one of the most dramatic finals in years. Conwy United also won the Fairplay League and young star Toby Jones picked up the top goalscorer award with a forty plus tally in all competitions which earned the youngster a move to full-time at Neath.

In the 2011–12 season, Conwy got off to a flying start in the second tier of Welsh football winning their first four games under new management Steve Jones and Dean Martin. However, form dropped dramatically and in December the duo left the club. former chairman Geoff Cartwright appointed Mick McGrath as manager who signed a number of key players the team needed including Dean Canning, John Owen and Eddie Jebb (on-loan from Bangor City). The club went on to finish 10th.

In April 2012 the Football Association of Wales domestic committee approved a name change request that from the 2012–13 season the club was to be renamed Conwy Borough F.C.

The club appointed Chris Herbert as the new first team manager in May 2012. The new manager re-structured the Y Morfa outfit in to a top three team which also lifted the league cup, when they beat Caersws on penalties in the final, with goalkeeper Terry McCormick saving two penalties, which was the Tangerines' 5th penalty shoot out win in cup competitions that season.

Chris Herbert and John Keegan left their posts in December 2013 and were replaced by players Darren Moss and Aden Shannon until the end of the season who guided the side to a second-placed finish. Moss was to remain in charge for the 2013–14 season but after a disappointing start was then released by the club in November 2014 with Shannon taking temporary charge and overseeing an 11th-placed finish. Shannon was placed in permanent charge of the Tangerines for the 2015–16 season but history was to repeat itself when, after a poor start and with the club languishing in the relegation zone, was relieved of his duties and was eventually replaced by Jason Aldcroft and former TNS defender Tommy Holmes. Aldcroft oversaw wholesale changes to the squad and steered the club to safety with an eventual 11th-placed finish.

Off the field, the club has made significant improvements to the stadium and its facilities and in the summer of 2014 the club opened its new clubhouse building "Y Morfa Venue". With a recent upgrade to the floodlights the club has moved a step closer to achieving a domestic club license. With a quickly growing junior section a youth Academy has also been established and expanded as the club looks to develop more local talent in the future.

At the close of the 2015–16 season, the resignations of Geoff Cartwright (chair) and Darren Cartwright (Vice Chair) due to personal commitments were accepted by the board of directors. Aldcroft and Jones left the club leading to the appointment of Gareth Thomas as first team manager & assistant Alun Winstanley.

August 2017 saw the introduction of new directors to the Executive board – local businessman Luke Blundell, solicitor Chris Wilton & existing committee member Craig Crossfield.

Gareth Thomas departed from his role as team manager in December 2018 having won the Welsh Alliance Division One title during his first season, in addition to the FAW Trophy and Cookson Cup.

In March 2025 the club announced a merger with Llandudno Swifts, stating that the first team would henceforth be known as Conwy Borough Swifts, starting in the 2025–26 season. However, in May 2026 it was announced that the club had reverted to being called Conwy Borough, as the Swifts became part of Llandudno FC.

== Former players ==
Notable former players for the club who have gone on to the Football League include Neville Southall, Carl Dale, Hugh McAuley and Kevin Ellison.

== Seasons ==
Year	League	Level	P	W	D	L	F	A	GD	Pts	Position	Welsh Cup
as Conwy United F.C.
1977–78	Welsh League North	1	22	11	7	4	41	31	+10	29	5th of 12	R3
1978–79	Welsh League North	1	20	8	5	7	40	38	+2	21	6th of 11	R1
1979–80	Welsh League North	1	18	5	3	10	17	32	−15	13	8th of 10	R2
1980–81	Welsh League North	1	22	9	2	11	34	43	−9	20	8th of 12	R1
1981–82	Welsh League North	1	26	15	5	6	41	30	+11	35	4th of 14	R2
1982–83	Welsh League North	1	22	7	7	8	33	26	+7	21	7th of 12	R3
1983–84	Welsh League North	1	18	7	7	4	32	23	+9	19 ^{†}	4th of 10 ^{†} Transferred to Welsh Alliance League	R2
1984–85	Welsh Alliance League	1	28	21	3	4	107	34	+73	45	1st of 15; Champions	R2
1985–86	Welsh Alliance League	1	30	21	6	3	88	31	+57	48	1st of 16; Champions	R1
1986–87	Welsh Alliance League	1	26	9	5	12	38	55	−17	23	8th of 14	R1
1987–88	Welsh Alliance League	1	30	8	5	17	57	76	−19	21	12th of 16	R1
1988–89	Welsh Alliance League	1	32	11	10	11	58	55	+3	43	10th of 17	R2
1989–90	Welsh Alliance League	1	34	14	6	14	70	61	+9	48	9th of 18; Transferred to Cymru Alliance	R2
1990–91	Cymru Alliance	1	26	12	6	8	54	34	+20	42	5th of 14	R2
1991–92	Cymru Alliance	1	30	11	12	7	41	33	+8	45	5th of 16; Transferred to League of Wales	R1
1992–93	League of Wales	1	38	16	9	13	51	51	0	57	7th of 20	R3
1993–94	League of Wales	1	38	13	6	19	58	70	−12	45	13th of 20	R2
1994–95	League of Wales	1	38	14	7	17	60	65	−5	49	12th of 20	R2
1995–96	League of Wales	1	40	21	13	6	101	58	+43	76	3rd of 21	R3
1996–97	League of Wales	1	40	20	8	12	66	44	+22	68	7th of 21	SF
1997–98	League of Wales	1	38	15	8	15	66	59	+7	53	9th of 20	R3
1998–99	League of Wales	1	32	14	7	11	54	49	+5	49	7th of 17	SF
1999–00	League of Wales	1	34	6	5	23	33	96	−63	20 ^{††}	17th of 18 ^{††} Relegated and demoted	R3
2000–01	Welsh Alliance League	3	26	4	8	14	38	86	−48	20	13th of 14	R1
2001–02	Welsh Alliance League	3	24	18	2	4	57	28	+29	56	2nd of 13	R1
2002–03	Welsh Alliance League	3	28	4	3	21	31	86	−55	15	15th of 15	R1
2003–04	Welsh Alliance League	3	30	8	1	21	44	89	−45	25	13th of 16	R1
2004–05	Welsh Alliance League	3	30	19	4	7	70	42	+28	61	5th of 16	R1
2005–06	Welsh Alliance League	3	30	9	5	16	41	50	−9	32	12th of 16	R2
2006–07	Welsh Alliance League	3	28	11	4	13	58	70	−12	37	9th of 15	R2
2007–08	Welsh Alliance League	3	28	14	3	11	69	58	+11	45	5th of 15	R2
2008–09	Welsh Alliance League	3	32	12	4	16	63	64	−1	37 ^{†††}	12th of 17 ^{†††}	R1
2009–10	Welsh Alliance League	3	30	14	11	5	71	36	+35	50 ^{††††}	6th of 16 ^{††††}	R2
2010–11	Welsh Alliance League	3	30	25	2	3	88	30	+58	77	1st of 16; Promoted as champions	R2
2011–12	Cymru Alliance	2	30	10	7	13	59	65	−6	37	10th of 16	R1
as Conwy Borough F.C.
2012–13	Cymru Alliance	2	30	18	7	5	57	37	+20	61	3rd of 16	R3
2013–14	Cymru Alliance	2	30	19	6	5	66	35	+31	63	2nd of 16	R3
2014–15	Cymru Alliance	2	30	12	5	13	52	46	+6	41	11th of 16	R4
2015–16	Cymru Alliance	2	30	11	3	16	47	54	−7	36	11th of 16	R2
2017–18	Welsh Alliance League	3	28	20	4	4	107	37	+70	64	1st of 15; Promoted as champions	R2
2018–19	Cymru Alliance	2	30	9	9	12	46	42	+4	36	11th of 16	R1
2019–20	Cymru North	2	23	9	6	8	43	44	–1	33	6th of 16	R1
2020–21	Cymru North	2	Season cancelled due to COVID-19									
2021–22	Cymru North	2	28	8	8	12	42	59	–17	32	10th of 16	R3
2022–23	Cymru North	2	30	5	8	17	33	64	–31	23	14th of 16; Relegated	R3
2023–24	Ardal NW	3	30	8	7	15	56	70	–14	31	13th of 16	R1
2024–25	Ardal NW	3	30	3	0	27	31	138	–107	9	16th of 16; Relgated	QR2
as Conwy Borough Swifts
2025–26	North Wales Coast East Football League	4	22	12	0	10	60	46	+14	36	5th of 12	QR2
as Conwy Borough F.C.
2026–27	North Wales Coast East Football League											QR2

^{†} Conwy United deducted 2 points.
^{††} Conwy United deducted 3 points for failing to fulfil a fixture.
^{†††} Conwy United deducted 3 points.
^{††††} Conwy United deducted 3 points for failing to fulfil a fixture.
