= Glan Conway Rural District =

Rural district in Wales (1894–1935)

Glan Conway
- Area
  - 1901: 8,768 acres (35.48 km^{2})
  - 1931: 8,776 acres (35.52 km^{2})
- Population
  - 1901: 1,515
  - 1931: 1,853
- History
  - Created: 1894
  - Abolished: 1935
  - Succeeded by: Aled Rural District
- Status: Rural District (partial)
  - HQ: Conwy

Glan Conway (an anglicisation of the Welsh Glan Conwy) was an area in the administrative county of Denbighshire which was administered by the Conway Rural District in the neighbouring county of Caernarvonshire.

It consisted of two civil parishes formerly in the Conway Rural Sanitary District: Llanelian-yn-Rhos and Llansantffraid Glan Conwy.

This arrangement made sense as the parishes provided a connection between the main part of the Conway Rural District and the parish of Llysfaen, which was a detached exclave of Caernarvonshire. In 1923 Llysfaen was transferred to Denbighshire to become part of Colwyn Bay and Colwyn Urban District. Glan Conway remained under the aegis of Conway Rural District Council until 1935, when a general reorganisation of rural districts in Denbighshire under a County Review Order annexed the two parishes to Aled Rural District.

The name Glan Conway was not used consistently: in some census reports it was called "Unnamed Rural District". The two parishes, Llansantffraid and Llanelian were represented by two members and one member respectively on the Conway RDC. The Conway RDC maintained separate accounts for each District and the Glan Conway RDC was also dealt with quite separately for other purposes, such as rating and health reports.

== Sources ==
Denbighshire Administrative County (Vision of Britain)
