= M. S. Factory, Valley =

Former WWII site in Flintshire, Wales

Coordinates: 53.185°N 3.189°W

The M.S. (Ministry of Supply) Factory, Valley was a Second World War site in Rhydymwyn, Flintshire, Wales, that was used for the storage and production of mustard gas. It was later also used in the development of the UK's atomic bomb project. More recently, it became a bulk storage depot for emergency supplies.

== Site history ==
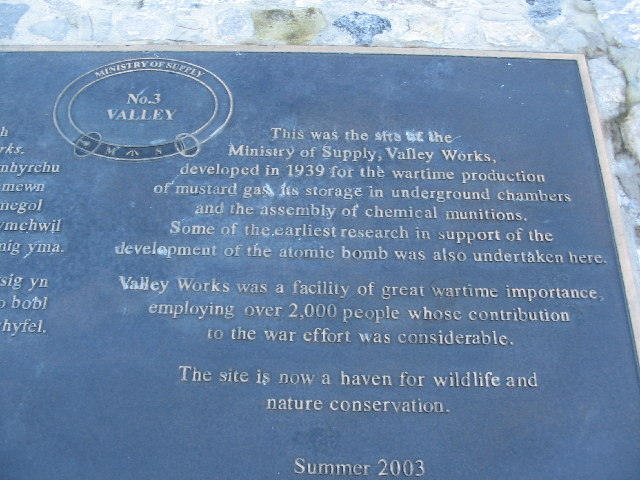
The Plaque outside the Rhydymywn Valley Nature Reserve

The site occupies around 35 hectares of the Alyn Valley, to the south of the village of Rhydymwyn (centred on SJ 205 668). Once part of the extensive Gwysaney Estate, the Parish of Rhydymwyn was established in 1865. Lead mining in the area is known to have been extensive, and a foundry associated with nearby mines is depicted on several early maps for the area. Following the closure of the foundry land use on the site was largely agricultural in character. However, in 1939 the land was purchased by the Ministry of Supply and developed as a purpose built chemical weapons factory and storage facility.

Over 100 specialised buildings were constructed across the site, linked by an extensive rail network established around a spur off the Chester to Denbigh mainline. Other major landscaping undertaken at this time included the canalisation and culverting of the River Alyn, and the excavation of a complex of interlinked subterranean, rock-cut tunnels and caverns. During World War II the plant produced ordnance containing mustard gas, and was associated with the development of the Atom Bomb. In the immediate Post-War period the site was used to store German nerve gas, and it was not until the 1950s when Britain relinquished its chemical weapons (CW) capability that the site as a chemical storage facility was defunct. However, the site remains on the international Chemical Weapons List, and is still monitored as such.

From the mid-1960s the site was used by various governmental departments, its major function being a buffer storage depot to supply emergency rations and foodstuffs, and associated facilities such as mobile bakeries and canteens. In 1994 the site was closed, and a programme of demolition was undertaken. This involved the dropping of buildings onto their footprints, and the rubble being mounded over with topsoil. Several major structures, and many ancillary buildings, still survive across the site.

The surviving buildings are a reminder of a huge building programme that changed the face of Britain forever and the site remains as unique today as it was at its inception.

=== Chemical weapons programme ===
In the late 1930s the Chamberlain Government planned that the United Kingdom should be in a position at the beginning of any war to retaliate in kind if the Germans, as expected, used mustard gas. In April/June 1939 the Alyn Valley was surveyed by the Department of Industrial Planning on behalf of the Ministry of Supply (MoS), and Imperial Chemical Industries (ICI) who were tasked with managing this programme.

The Treasury approved the sum of £546,000 for initial work on 27 August 1939, and work began in October 1939 on the storage tunnels in the limestone hillside, in the Alyn valley close to Rhydymwyn. The factory, to be called M.S. Factory, Valley, opened in 1941. The government authorised the expenditure of £3,161,671 and ICI's construction fee was £80,000.

Production was intended of both Runcol and Pyro variants of mustard; records reveal that only the purer and more stable Runcol was made in bulk.

In 1940–1959, it was involved in either the manufacturing, assembly or storage of chemical weapons, or mustard gas in bulk containers. During 1947–1959 the tunnel complex held the majority of the country's stock of mustard gas.

Research has shown that whilst the attrition rate of certain building types has been quite high across the site, there is no other chemical weapon production, storage and assembly site surviving within the UK in such a complete and readily understandable state. This makes the Valley Site as a whole a place of national significance, but of particular rarity and importance are the surviving production buildings, which are, as far as can be ascertained, unique survivals.

=== Nuclear weapons ===
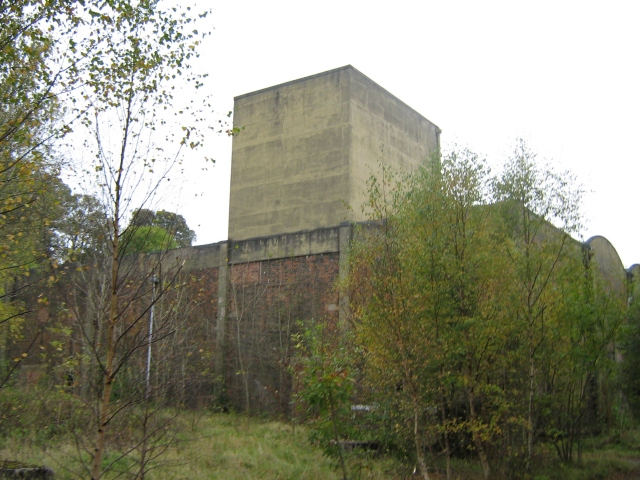
One of the buildings as it is today; used as a bat house

On accepting the findings of the Maud Report in 1941, the government of the day needed to verify that a cost-effective atomic bomb could be manufactured. This required verification that a gaseous diffusion process would work on an industrial scale to provide enough fissile material to manufacture a cost-effective and timely atomic bomb.

One of the surplus Pyro buildings at Valley (P6) was adapted for the testing of apparatus for uranium isotope separation in 1942 in an early phase of the Tube Alloys project before this was moved to America (developing later into the Manhattan Project). Four prototype gaseous diffusion plants were ordered from Metropolitan-Vickers, at Trafford Park, Manchester, at a cost of £150,000 and installed in the P6 building at Valley. Experiments continued until 1945 when the equipment was moved to Didcot and Harwell. The results of the experiments led to the building of the gaseous diffusion factory at Capenhurst, Cheshire. Building P6 is now a Grade II listed building and is of international importance; for a very brief period it was at the leading edge of nuclear physics.

=== Cold War storage site ===
During the Cold War, as a result of Great Britain's previous experiences of the U-boat blockade during both world wars, and disruption to transport communications as a result of aerial bombardment during World War II, the government decided to set up a system of food and raw material stockpiles to counter the threats of a nuclear war. These stores were mostly based on the reuse of existing government-owned sites and buildings; and the former M. S. Factory, Valley was adapted to become one of these storage sites.

=== Post Cold War ===
The site of the Valley Works has now been returned to nature. It attracts a wide variety of wildlife and is now designated as a nature reserve as outlined on a plaque at the entrance gates.

=== Tunnels Opened to Public ===
The official opening of the Rhydymwyn Tunnels took place on Saturday, 22 April 2017 when Ken Skates, the Cabinet Secretary for Economy and Infrastructure in the Welsh Government, officially opened the tunnels for public managed access.

== Statistics ==
- The Treasury originally approved the sum of £546,000 for initial work on the Valley Site.
- By 1943 there were c. 2,200 people working at Valley. The vast majority were directed to work there by the government and billeted with local families.
- There were 5.2 million munitions manufactured in the war years many of them smoke generators which were heavily utilised from D-Day onwards.
- The factory eventually cost £3.2 million and ICI received a £60,000 agency fee for its involvement.
- The site covers 86.8 acres (351,000 m^{2}), has 7 miles (11 km) of secure fencing and has always been “Secret”

== The Rhydymwyn Valley Nature Reserve ==
M.S. Factory, Valley has not been used since the mid-1990s. In the preceding postwar period many of the buildings were still in use, mainly as a buffer storage depot, but some were demolished because they were considered dangerous. The site has become a Nature Reserve and a Visitor Centre was built on the site of the old gatehouse. The site covers 86 acres (350,000 m^{2}) to the south of the village in a U-shaped valley. The site was once the home to ancient lead mines and a 19th-century metal foundry. The western side of the site is semi-ancient deciduous woodland with an understorey of wild garlic, snowdrops, bluebells and orchids. The River Alyn flows in from the north-west corner of the site and follows the western side of the valley. The river originally meandered through the centre of the valley but it was diverted as part of the early construction works. The river was canalised and given steep concrete sides and a concrete base. The middle section of the river is culverted underground for two sections. The site is now home to 7 herptile species, 8 species of fish, 17 species of butterfly/moth and 8 species of bat. 67 bird species have nested or been observed on the site.

== See also ==
- Chemical warfare
