= Welsh League North =

- Founded: 1935
- Folded: 1984
- Country: Wales
- Level on pyramid: 1
- Domestic cup: Welsh Cup
- Most championships: Porthmadog (6 titles)

The Welsh League North was a football league in north and central Wales which formed the first level of the Welsh football league system between 1935 and 1984.

It is considered North Wales's most successful league, running uninterrupted apart from the Second World War for forty-nine years until its transition into the Welsh Alliance League in for the 1984–85 season.

== Champions ==
- 1935–36 - Llandudno
- 1936–37 - Llandudno
- 1937–38 - Porthmadog
- 1938–39 - Llandudno
- 1939–40 (season uncompleted)
  - Western Area: Caernarfon Town
  - Eastern Area: Connah's Quay St Davids
- 1945–46 - H.M.S. Glendower
- 1946–47 – Caernarfon Town
- 1947–48 - Penrhyn Quarry
- 1948–49 - Llandudno Junction
- 1949–50 - Holywell Town
- 1950–51 - Pwllheli
- 1951–52 - Pwllheli
- 1952–53 - Holywell Town
- 1953–54 - 55th R.A. Tonfannau
- 1954–55 - Fflint Town United
- 1955–56 - Fflint Town United
- 1956–57 - Fflint Town United
- 1957–58 - Holywell Town
- 1958–59 - Borough United
- 1959–60 - Nantlle Vale
- 1960–61 - Pwllheli
- 1961–62 - Blaenau Ffestiniog
- 1962–63 - Borough United
- 1963–64 - Holywell Town
- 1964–65 - Colwyn Bay
- 1965–66 - Caernarfon Town
- 1966–67 - Porthmadog
- 1967–68 - Porthmadog
- 1968–69 - Porthmadog
- 1969–70 - Holywell Town
- 1970–71 - Bethesda Athletic
- 1971–72 - Blaenau Ffestiniog
- 1972–73 - Blaenau Ffestiniog
- 1973–74 - Blaenau Ffestiniog
- 1974–75 - Porthmadog
- 1975–76 - Porthmadog
- 1976–77 - Bethesda Athletic
- 1977–78 - Caernarfon Town
- 1978–79 - Caernarfon Town
- 1979–80 - Blaenau Ffestiniog
- 1980–81 - Colwyn Bay
- 1981–82 - Courtaulds Greenfield
- 1982–83 - Colwyn Bay
- 1983–84 - Colwyn Bay

=== Number of titles by winning clubs ===
- Porthmadog – 6 titles
- Blaenau Ffestiniog – 5 titles
- Caernarfon Town – 5 titles
- Holywell Town – 4 titles
- Colwyn Bay – 4 titles
- Llandudno – 3 titles
- Fflint Town United – 3 titles
- Pwllheli – 3 titles
- Bethesda Athletic – 2 titles
- Borough United – 2 titles
- 55th R.A. Tonfannau – 1 title
- Connah's Quay St Davids – 1 title
- Courtaulds Greenfield – 1 title
- H.M.S.Glendower – 1 title
- Llandudno Junction – 1 title
- Nantlle Vale – 1 title
- Penrhyn Quarry – 1 title

== See also ==
- List of association football competitions
- Welsh Football League – which included the top level league in South Wales
