= Farrar Road Stadium =

Stadium in Bangor, Wales

Farrar Road
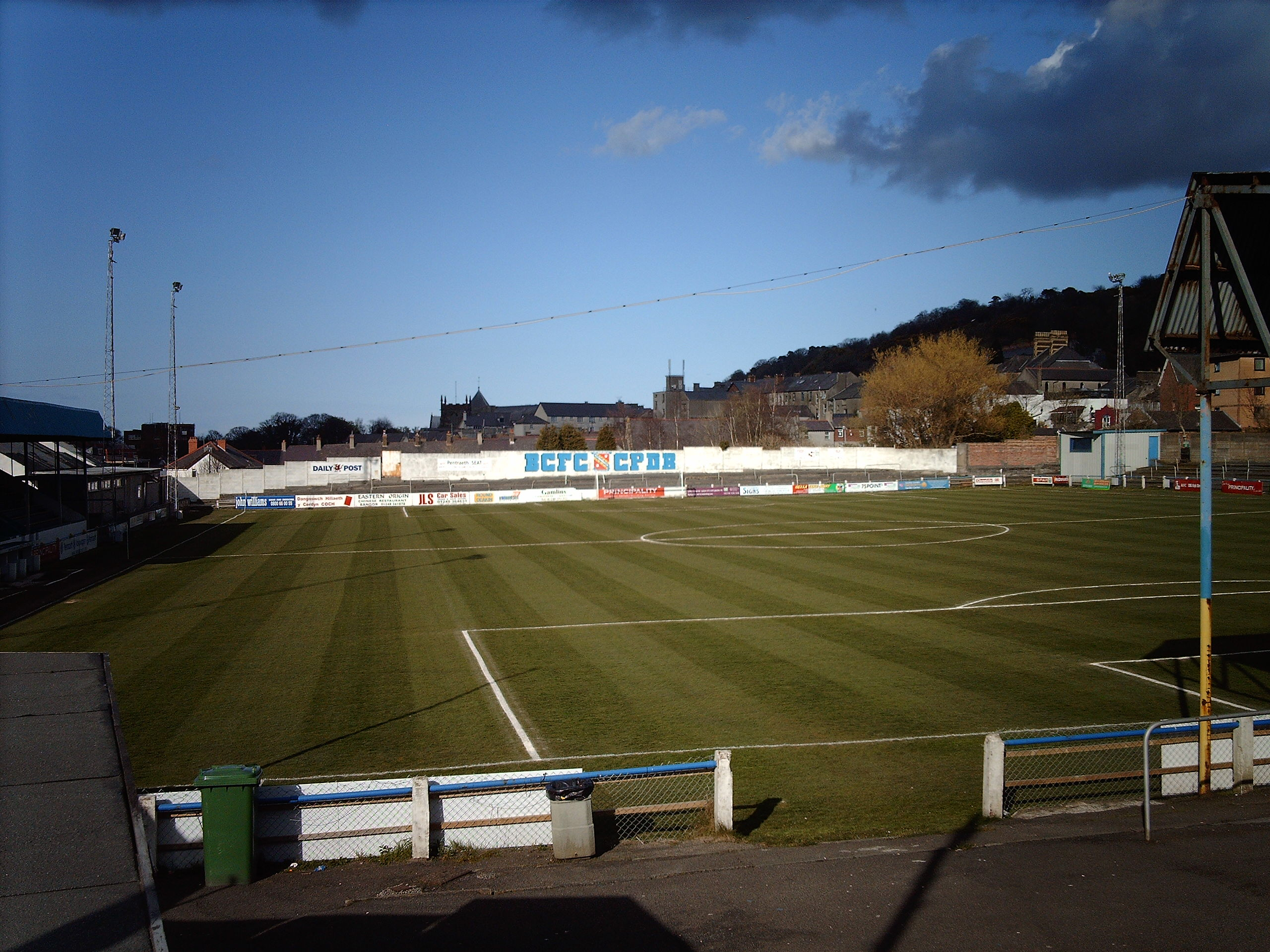
- View from Farrar Road end.
- Interactive map of Farrar Road
- Full name: Farrar Road Stadium
- Location: Bangor, Gwynedd, Wales
- Coordinates: 53°13′27″N 4°7′53″W
- Owner: Bangor City Council
- Capacity: 1,500
- Surface: Grass

Construction
- Opened: 1922
- Closed: 2011
- Demolished: 2012

Tenant
- Bangor City F.C. (1920–2011)

Farrar Road Stadium was a multi-purpose stadium in Bangor, Wales. The site of the ground is now covered by an Asda supermarket. From 1920, the year it was opened, until 2011 it was used mostly for football matches and was the home of Bangor City F.C. The stadium held 1,500 people, with 700 seats.

The stadium was due to be demolished and redeveloped into a leisure complex after the 2008–09 season. Due to several delays however the last game that Bangor played there was a 5–3 win for the home side versus Prestatyn Town on 27 December 2011. The club then moved to their new stadium at Nantporth, situated on the outskirts of the city by the Menai Strait.

It was announced in 2010 that the council had signed a deal with Asda to build a supermarket on the stadium site; this despite the stipulation by original landowners Penrhyn Estates that it would be used for sporting and leisure facilities in perpetuity for the benefit of the local populace. The stadium was demolished in 2012.
