= Caerwys F.C. =

Association football club in Wales

- Full name: Caerwys Football Club
- Founded: 1900c. as Caerwys Town
- Ground: Lon yr Ysgol, Caerwys
- Capacity: 500
- Chairman: Chris Doyle
- Manager: Daniel Sands
- League: North East Wales Division Two
- 2025–26: North East Wales Division Three, 1st of 8 (promoted)
- Website: https://cpdcaerwysfc.wales/
Home colours	Away colours

Caerwys F.C. (Welsh Clwb Pêl Droed Caerwys) is a football club representing the Flintshire town of Caerwys in Wales, and they play their home games at Lon yr Ysgol at Caerwys. They play in the North East Wales Division Two.

They joined the North East Wales Football League after the reorganisation of the Clwyd League in the 2011–12 season.

== History ==
Located in Flintshire on the border with Denbighshire, Caerwys F.C. was formed at the turn of the century when they were known as Caerwys Town. Unfortunately there are no records of that team apart from a team photo from 1921. It is believed they just played friendly matches until a team apparently joined the Halkyn Mountain League post-war.

In more recent times a team was entered into the Llandyrnog & District Summer League in 1967. Success was achieved in 1971 and 1973 when Caerwys won the League Championship and they boasted a very strong side. They also won the Times Shield, a knockout competition on three occasions in 1970, 1989 & 1990.

In 1983 a team was entered into Division 3 of the Clwyd League. In 1996–97 they were promoted from Division 1 after finishing 3rd. The team progressed through to the Clwyd League Premier Division, finishing runners up in 1999–2000 in the Premier Division. Caerwys gained promotion to the Welsh Alliance League, where they remained until 2007. Their best season was in 2002–03, when they gained their highest ever league finish (11th) as well as reaching the semi-finals of the FAW Trophy, the North Wales Coast Challenge Cup and the Alves Cup.

In 2009 local builder and committee member Shaun Davies began work on the new pavilion. A£30,000 grant was obtained from Flintshire County Council plus £2500 from Caerwys Town Council with the club providing £18,000 from fundraising. This was enough to complete phase one. An additional grant of £26,000 from Cadwyn Clwyd, which the club had to match fund with 30%, saw the completion of phase 2 by 2012. The club's kit used to be sponsored by Shotblast Engineering Services based at Greenfield, whose owner, Roger Burgess, died on 20 September 2011. The company sponsored the club on and off for 25 years. Since then the club has been sponsored by the Royal Oak, Holywell based ICRGroup for two seasons then local based Thomas Plant Hire since 2015.

Caerwys were promoted from the Clwyd League East at the end of the 2013–14 season into the Welsh National League Division 1. After three seasons in the WNL, the team resigned before the season ended, citing lack of commitment from players combined by a poorly run league. The following season 2016–17, Caerwys entered the North East Wales league with local player Nick Voyle appointed as Manager. The team finished tenth, having beaten most of the better sides in the league. 2018–19 started well with the team progressing in two cups but in December 2018, Voyle resigned as Team Manager, citing lack of commitment from players. Shaun Davies took over as Interim Manager and the team finished the season on a winning run with only one defeat in six matches and that was only due to having no recognised keeper. The team finished in a creditable fifth spot. The club were going to apply to the Vale of Clwyd league for season 2019-20 but decided to stay where they were the guidance of Ethan Jones and Jordan Hadaway. Caerwys Veterans also finished mid-table in the newly formed North East Wales Vets League which was won by Rhyl.

In 2020 the club were founding members of the new North East Wales Football League. In September 2024 the club folded its team playing in the NEWFL.

They rejoined the league in 2025–26 and were promoted from Division Three in their first season. They were confirmed as champions at the end of February 2026.

== Current squad ==
Note: Flags indicate national team as defined under FIFA eligibility rules; some limited exceptions apply. Players may hold more than one non-FIFA nationality.

No.	Pos.	Nation	Player
—	GK	POL	Seb Czubaj
—	GK	WAL	Lewys Thomson
—	DF	ENG	Dai Booth
—	DF	WAL	Kyle De-Lloyd
—	DF	WAL	Chris Evans
—	DF	WAL	Alex Harrison-Smith
—	DF	WAL	Matty Palin
—	DF	WAL	Kieran Smith
—	MF	WAL	Deiniol Bower
—	MF	WAL	Ben Hartley
—	MF	WAL	Josh Richardson
—	MF	POL	Jaroslaw Sakowicz

No.	Pos.	Nation	Player
—	MF	WAL	Theo Woolford
—	FW	WAL	Osian Audley
—	FW	WAL	Jon Edmonds
—	FW	WAL	Arran Flynn
—	FW	WAL	Seth Geary
—	FW	WAL	Elgan Hughes
—	FW	WAL	Murray Hughes
—	FW	WAL	Jack Wakeman
—	FW	WAL	Luke Williams
—	FW	WAL	Ruari Wood

== Honours ==
- Clwyd League Premier Division – Runners-up: 1999–2000
- North East Wales Football League Division Three – Champions: 2025–26
- Llandyrnog & District Summer League – Champions: 1971, 1973
- Times Shield – Winners: 1970, 1989, 1990
