= Glan Conwy F.C. =

Association football club in Wales

Glan Conwy
- Full name: Glan Conwy Football Club
- Founded: 1980
- Ground: Cae Ffwt; Glan Conwy
- Capacity: 220
- Manager: Mike Hughes and Jake Colville with Player Coaches Mezz Knight, John Gardner and Cameron West
- League: North Wales Coast East Premier Division
- 2024–25: North Wales Coast East Premier Division, 11th of 15
- Website: http://www.pitchero.com/clubs/glanconwy
Home colours

Glan Conwy Football Club are a Welsh football club playing in the North Wales Coast East Premier Division. They are a member of the North Wales Coast Football Association.

== History ==
Glan Conwy joined the newly formed Vale of Conwy League in 1922 as one of the seven founder members, the others being Dolgarrog, Llandudno Junction Reserves, Llanrwst Reserves, Old Colwyn FC, Penmaen Celts, and Penmaenmawr Reserves.

The club nickname was the "Jolly Boys" and they played at the former Gala Field. They remained playing in this league until the end of the 1938–39 season and the outbreak of the Second World War. After the end of the war in 1945 there is no record of the club reforming.

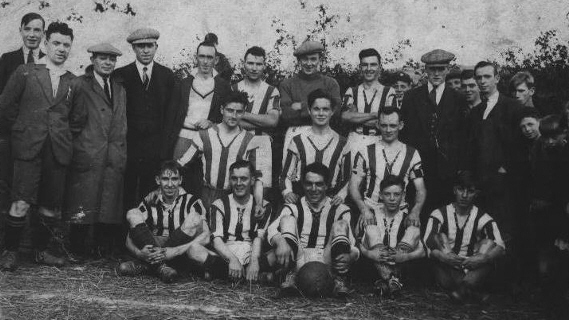
Glan Conwy Jolly Boys circa 1938

Brian Thomas and Dewi Williams of Glan Conwy reformed the club in 1979 and the following year the team rejoined the Vale of Conwy League. Without a home pitch, they played their home games at different venues such as the Llandudno Oval, Hotpoint, Quinton Hazell and Junction Flyover. They remained in the Vale of Conwy League for a further eighteen years. They won the league championship as well as the NWCFA Junior Cup in 1998 and were promoted to the Gwynedd League. They stayed in this league for just the one season at the end of which they were crowned league champions and were promoted to the Welsh Alliance League. The club reached the final of the FAW Trophy in 2007 but lost heavily to Brymbo. The club had a successful 2009–10 season reaching the final of the FAW Trophy and beating local rivals Llandudno Junction to a second-place finish in the league. They beat South Wales outfit Clydach Wasps 5–1 in the FAW Trophy final to take the cup home to Cae Ffwt.

The home ground is Cae Ffwt, a ground in the village of Glan Conwy which is situated on the banks of the River Conwy. The club's colours changed almost annually depending on shirt sponsorship but in 1997 the club adopted green and white stripes, which has now become green and white hoops.

== Honours ==
=== Leagues ===
- Welsh Alliance League – Runners-up: 2007–08
- Welsh Alliance League Division Two – Champions: 2018–19
- Gwynedd League – Champions: 1998–99
- Vale of Conwy Football League – Winners: 1997–98
- Vale of Conwy Football League – Runners-up: 1932–33
- Vale of Conwy Football League Division Two (Section B) – Champions: 1981–82
- Clwyd Football League Division Two – Champions: 2006–07 (reserves)

=== Cups ===
- FAW Welsh Trophy – Winners: 2009–10
- FAW Welsh Trophy – Runners-up: 2006–07
- North Wales Coast FA Junior Challenge Cup – Winners: 1997–98
- NWCFA Youth Cup – Winners: 2007–08
- Barritt Cup – Runners-up: 1998–99
- Cookson Cup – Runners-up: 2008–09
- Eryri Shield – Winners: 1998–99
- Frank Tyldesley Cup – Winners: 1996–97
- Jack Owen Cup – Runners-up: 1923–24
- John Hughes Challenge Cup – Winners: 1991–92, 1997–98
- Quinton Hazel Trophy – Winners: 1996–97
- Ron Jones Cup – Winners: 1989–90, 2007–08
