= Rhydymwyn =

Village in Flintshire, Wales

Coordinates: 53.18000°N 3.19000°W

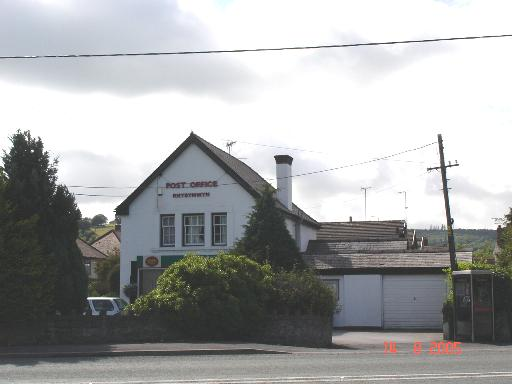
- Post office at Rhydymwyn

- Location within Flintshire
- Population: 522 (2021)
- OS grid reference: SJ205665
- Community: Cilcain
- Principal area: Flintshire
- Preserved county: Clwyd
- Country: Wales
- Sovereign state: United Kingdom
- Post town: Mold
- Postcode district: CH7
- Dialling code: 01352
- Police: North Wales
- Fire: North Wales
- Ambulance: Welsh
- UK Parliament: Clwyd East
- Senedd Cymru – Welsh Parliament: Delyn

Rhydymwyn (Welsh for 'Ford of the Ore' (Note: referring to a ford across the River Alyn now replaced by a small iron bridge)) is a village in Flintshire, Wales, located in the upper Alyn valley. Once a district of Mold, it was recognised as a separate parish from 1865. It is now part of the community of Cilcain. In 2011 it had a population of 522.

== Geography ==
The geology of the area consists of a layer of extremely pure, and hence structurally sound, 200 feet (61 m) thick layer of limestone at depths ranging from surface to 900 feet (270 m). The limestone holds other minerals, including nickel and copper deposits, making it an ideal site for mining.

== History ==
The industrialisation of nearby Northwest England led to demand for the mineral deposits in the Alyn valley and an increase in population of local villages, including Rhydymwyn. From the mid-18th century, Rhydymwyn was the site for a range of industries, which included foundries, waterwheels as well as mine workings.

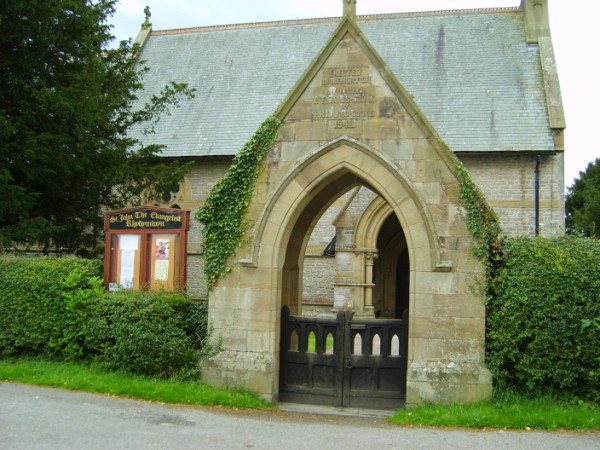
The Parish Church of St John the Evangelist Rhydymwyn

The new parish of Rhydymwyn was created on 31 March 1865, comprising: parts of the townships of Gwysaney and Gwernaffield, formerly in the parish of Mold; parts of the townships of Cefn and Glust (or Llysdianhunedd), and the whole of the township of Mechlas, formerly in the parish of Cilcain; and part of the township of Caerfallwch, formerly in the parish of Northop. The foundation stone of the new parish church, dedicated to St. John the Evangelist, was laid on 1 August 1861, and the church was consecrated on 17 September 1864. It has been designated a grade II* listed building.

The Ministry of Supply (M.S.) Valley Factory, constructed from 1939, was the principal UK location for the production of mustard gas during the Second World War, and was used for storage of the gas until stocks were destroyed in 1958. Building P6 on the site was used for the experimental production of Uranium-235 by the gaseous diffusion method as part of the Tube Alloys project, until work on the development of the atomic bomb was transferred to North America following the Quebec Agreement of 1943.

The Denbigh and Mold Junction Railway had a Rhydymwyn station on the south side of A541, which opened on 6 September 1869. The station closed to passengers on 30 April 1962 and completely from 4 May 1964. The former station building is now a private house.

=== Ffynnon leinw ===
Approximately 1 mile (1.6 km) from Rhydymwyn is the small hamlet of Hendre. Along the main road from the old Sardis Chapel, and only a few feet from the edge of the A541, there is an ancient well – Ffynnon leinw – (leinw comes from the Welsh word "llanw" meaning tide as it is reported that the water in the well rose and ebbed with the tides of the Dee Estuary). The well has been listed as one of the holy wells of Wales on a par with the more famous St Winefride's Well in Holywell. The well in Hendre is mentioned by Thomas Pennant in his 'A Tour in Wales' - written between 1778–1783 and also by Giraldus Cambrensis or Gerald of Wales in his 'Journey through Wales' written in 1191 - an itinerary of his 1188 tour of Wales as he accompanied Archbishop Baldwin of Exeter to enlist support for the Third Crusade.

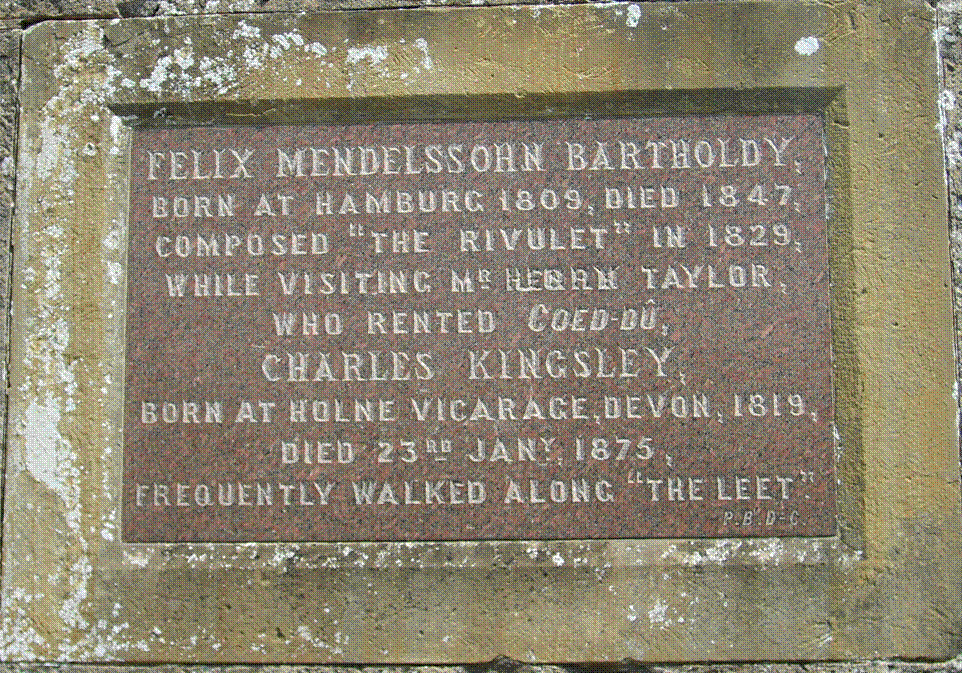
The Plaque to Mendelssohn and Charles Kingsley in Rhydymwyn

=== Mendelssohn and Charles Kingsley ===
The German composer Felix Mendelssohn composed The Rivulet in 1829 while visiting his father's friend John Taylor (a mining engineer and entrepreneur) and his family in 1829 who rented Coed Du. This work was inspired by the beauty of the countryside. During the same visit, Mendelssohn composed his operetta Son and Stranger.

Charles Kingsley, author of The Water-Babies, A Fairy Tale for a Land Baby, also came and walked the Leete; both his and Mendelssohn's visits are commemorated by a plaque in Nant Alyn Road, Rhydymwyn.

=== Recent times ===
In the autumn of 2000, local rainfall was exceptional in terms of intensity and duration. Between 28 October and 6 November, 68 homes and 8 businesses flooded in Rhydymwyn because of overflow from the River Alyn. In 2002 and 2003, DEFRA's internal team in two phases created a flood alarm and protection scheme to protect the whole village and Valley Works, with a level of protection in excess of a flood with a 1% chance of occurring in any one year. The total cost for the scheme was £88,000.

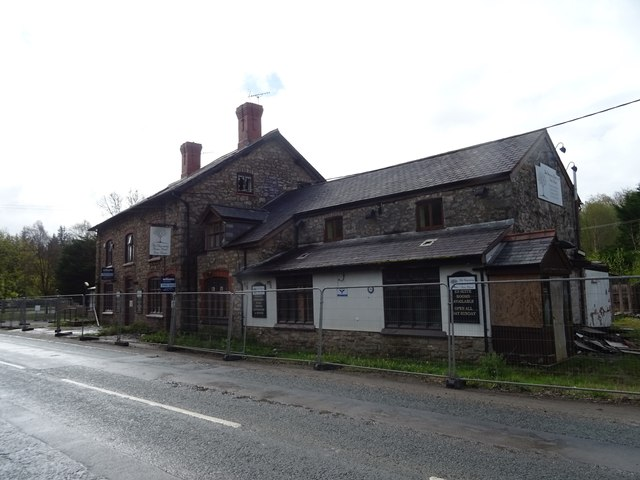
The Gwysaney Arms Hotel in 2024

The Gwysaney Arms Hotel, formerly called The Antelope has been closed since November 2016 and is now in substantial disrepair. A proposal has been made to demolish it and replace it with 9 houses.

== See also ==
- M. S. Factory, Valley The Valley Works at Rhydymwyn
