= Llandudno Junction F.C. =

Association football club in Wales

Llandudno Junction
- Full name: Llandudno Junction Football Club
- Nicknames: The Junction, The Railwaymen
- Founded: 1975; 51 years ago (as Hotpoint Football Club)
- Ground: The Maelgwyn Stadium, Llandudno Junction
- Vice-chairman: Connor McNamara
- Chairman: Garry Plumb
- Manager: Colin Birtles
- League: North Wales Coast East Premier Division
- 2025–26: North Wales Coast East Premier Division, 7th of 12
- Website: www.llandudnojunctionfc.com
Home colours	Away colours

Llandudno Junction FC are a football club based in Llandudno Junction, playing in the North Wales Coast East Premier Division.

== Club history ==
The current club was founded as Hotpoint FC in 1975, playing in the Old Colwyn and District Sunday League. After one season they joined the Vale of Conwy Football League in Saturday football. During the 1996–97 season the team moved to Llanfairfechan's Recreation Ground due to the limitations of the Victoria Drive ground. As a result, the team changed its name to Llanfairfechan Athletic.

In 1998, the club returned to Llandudno Junction, to their current ground at The Flyover, which had previously been the home of Crosville. The team changed its name again, to Llandudno Junction FC, for the 1999–2000 season.

In the 2008–09 season, the club won the Barritt Cup, and had in their squad future Wolves striker Jake Cassidy.

In 2017, Junction were promoted to the Cymru Alliance, the highest level they had ever played at. However, they lasted only one season in the league before being relegated. The following season (2018–19) they were again relegated, having finished bottom of Division 1 of the Welsh Alliance League.

Since 2021 the team has played in the North Wales Coast East Football League Premier Division.

=== Honours ===
==== Hotpoint Football Club ====
- Vale of Conwy League Section A – Champions: 1986–87
- Vale of Conwy League Section B – Champions: 1984–85
- Ron Jones Trophy – Winners: 1984–85
- NWWN Challenge Cup – Winners: 1986–87
- Cwpan Gwynedd – Winners: 1994–95
- Cwpan Gwynedd – Runners-up: 1996–97
- Tyn Lon Rover Barritt Cup – Winners: 1998–99
- League Runners-up Shield: 1995–96; 1996–97

==== Llandudno Junction ====
- Welsh Alliance League – Runners-up (3): 2014–15; 2015–16; 2016–17
- Tyn Lon Rover Barritt Cup – Winners: 2008–09
- NWCFA Intermediate Cup – Runners-up: 2025–26

== Stadium ==
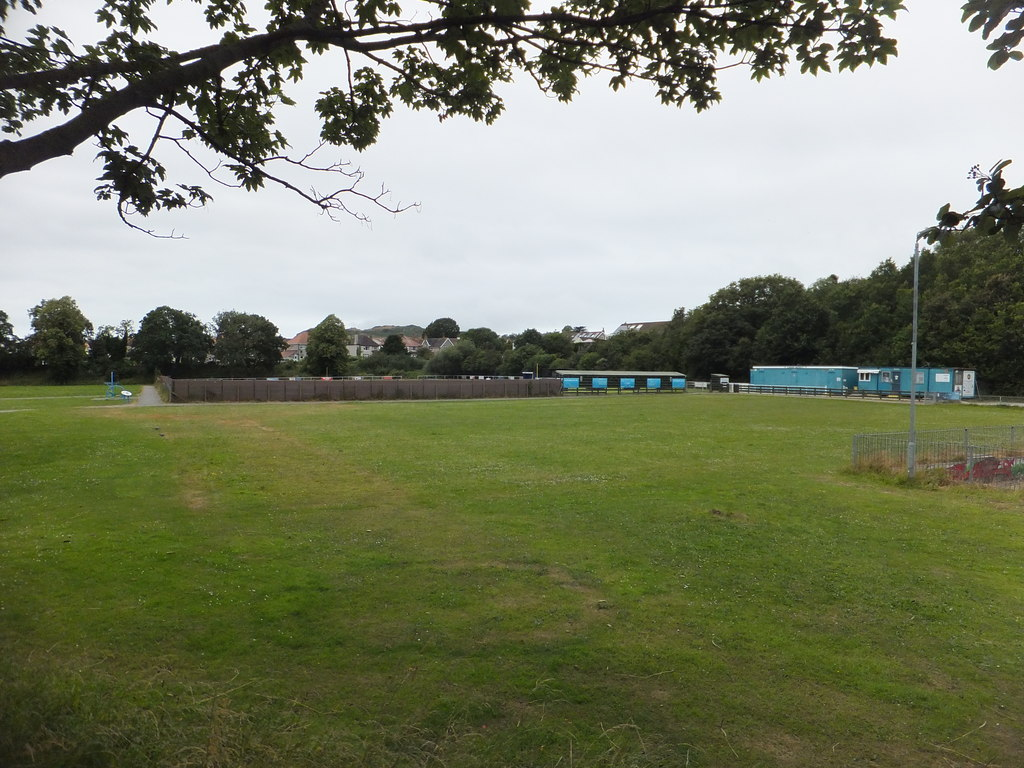

The club have played at The Flyover ground since 1998. The ground was previously used by Crosville. It features covered seating and standing areas.

== Previous clubs ==
=== Original club ===
The original Llandudno Junction first played in the North Wales Coast League Division One in 1910. They joined the Welsh National League (North) in 1922, and were runners-up in 1924–25, but folded in 1927.

==== Honours ====
- Welsh National League (North) – Runners-up: 1924–25

=== Second club ===
A second Llandudno Junction entered the Vale of Conwy League at the start of the 1937–38 season. The team were promoted after finishing league runners-up in the 1945–46 season. Their first season in the Welsh League North saw them finish runners-up and in 1948–49 they were league champions. This league was at the time the highest level of league football in North and Central Wales. In 1954, this second incarnation of Llandudno Junction merged with Conwy to form Borough United.

The club colours at this time were maroon tops and white shorts.

==== Honours ====
- Welsh League North
  - Champions: 1948–49
  - Runners-Up: 1946–47
- Vale of Conwy League – Runners-up: 1945-46

== Women's team ==
Llandudno Junction Ladies have played three seasons in the Welsh Premier Women's League. Their first was in 2010–11, where they were relegated. They returned in 2012–13 and remained in the league for the following season but in 2014 became part of Llandudno F.C.

As of 2025 the club still runs girls teams, and hopes to enter a team into the league system by 2026–27.
