= Llandudno Junction =

Town in Conwy County Borough, Wales

Coordinates: 53.284°N 3.809°W

Llandudno Junction: Welsh: Cyffordd Llandudno
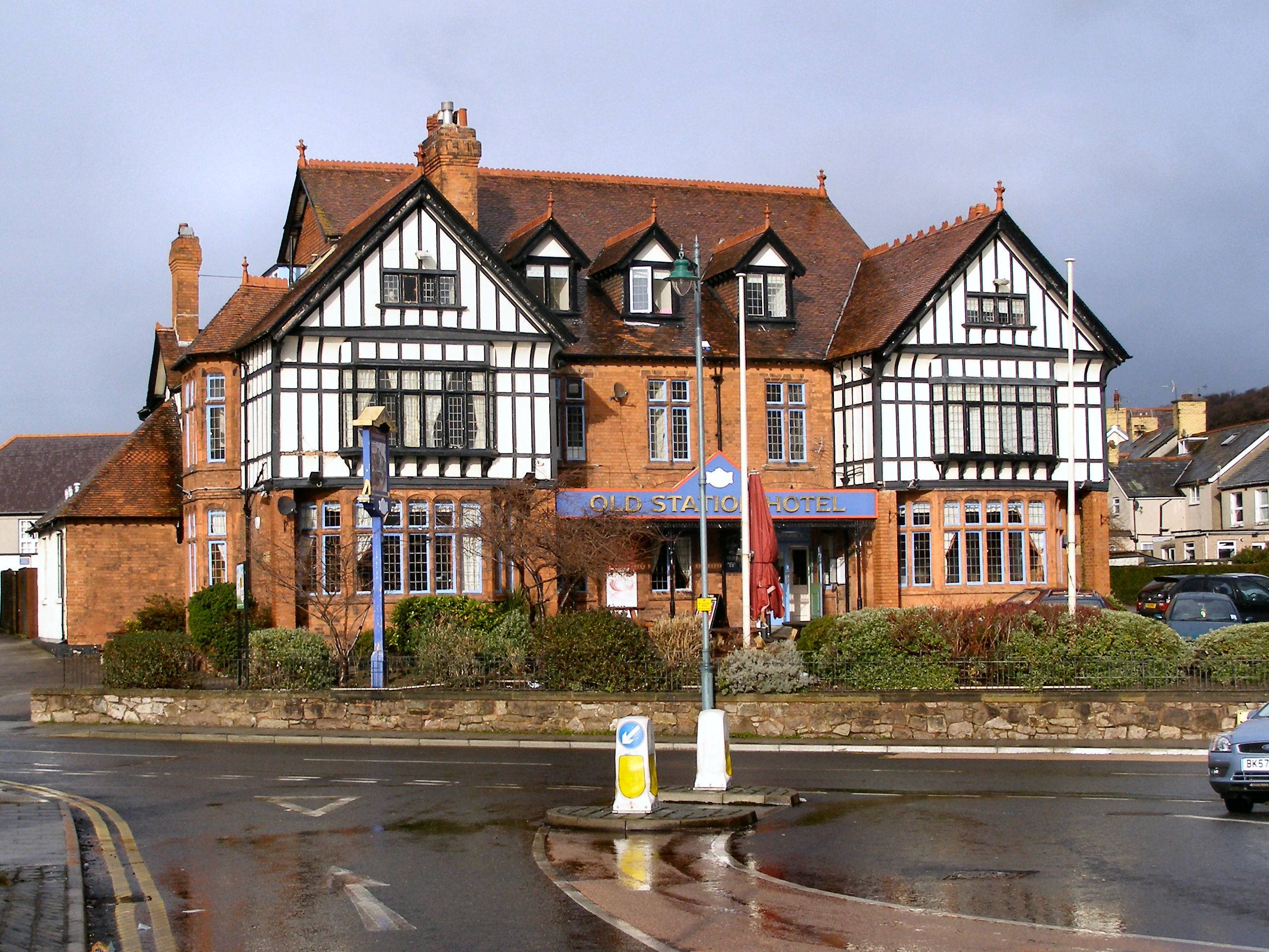
- Old Station Hotel, Llandudno Junction

- Location within Conwy
- Population: 6,722 (2011)
- OS grid reference: SH794778
- Community: Conwy
- Principal area: Conwy
- Preserved county: Clwyd
- Country: Wales
- Sovereign state: United Kingdom
- Post town: LLANDUDNO JUNCTION
- Postcode district: LL31
- Dialling code: 01492
- Police: North Wales
- Fire: North Wales
- Ambulance: Welsh
- UK Parliament: Bangor Aberconwy
- Senedd Cymru – Welsh Parliament: Bangor Conwy Môn

Llandudno Junction (Welsh: Cyffordd Llandudno), once known as Tremarl, is a town in the community of Conwy in Conwy County Borough, Wales. Llandudno Junction and neighbouring Deganwy are both part of the built-up area and community of Conwy.

== History ==
It takes its name from Llandudno Junction railway station, built in 1858 as the junction for the Llandudno branch line; the town of Llandudno lies 3 miles (4.8 km) north of Llandudno Junction.

When the railway station was built, it straddled the boundary between the parish of Llangystennin and the part of the parish of Eglwys Rhos which was within the ancient borough boundaries of Conwy. A parish called Llanrhos was created in 1894 for the part of Eglwys Rhos within the Conwy borough boundaries. The parish of Llangystennin was abolished in 1934, and the settlement of Llandudno Junction that had grown up around the station was thereafter placed wholly in the parish of Llanrhos in the borough of Conwy.

Local employment opportunities changed significantly in the latter quarter of the 20th century owing to the loss not only of the railway depots but also of a major electrical manufacturing facility (Hotpoint), of which part of the old factory site is under planning application for three more Car Dealerships.

Another part of the factory site was bought by the Welsh Government and construction began in 2007 on a new office building that houses around 525 employees, including about 100 tourism, transport and enterprise jobs which were relocated from Cardiff. The keys to the building were officially handed over from the developers in May 2010.

The Old Station Hotel stands opposite the railway station. It is known locally as 'The Killer' or in Welsh 'Y Killer'. One version of the myth on how it got its name is that train drivers would get drunk there, then drive trains, effectively turning them into possible 'Killers'. Another version states that this is where the railway workers would spend their lunch breaks, i.e. 'killed time'.

== Transport ==
The station is today a junction between the Crewe-Holyhead line and the Llandudno-Blaenau Ffestiniog line. There are through trains from Manchester to Llandudno, but passengers travelling from London, Cardiff, or Holyhead to Llandudno usually have to change trains at Llandudno Junction. Llandudno Junction is its own post town.

Buses are run by Arriva Wales and Llew Jones. Services go to nearby towns and villages.

== Facilities ==
Llandudno Junction, in addition to its passenger interchange, had a major steam locomotive servicing depot and extensive goods facilities. This railway depot was called 6G, and a new section of the A546 (carrying the name "Ffordd 6G Road") now crosses the site. The site of the depot and goods yard has been redeveloped, now accommodating a business park, fast food outlets, a leisure centre, a Cineworld multiplex cinema, and a Tesco supermarket. Llandudno Junction has recently added a Lidl store, too.

== Education ==
In September 2016, the two primary schools in Llandudno Junction, Ysgol Maelgwn and Ysgol Nant-y-Coed, amalgamated to form a new school, Ysgol Awel y Mynydd.

== Football ==
Llandudno Junction F.C. are the local football team. The town was previously home to Welsh Cup winners Borough United F.C.
