= Glan Conwy =

Village and community in Conwy, Wales

Llansanffraid Glan Conwy
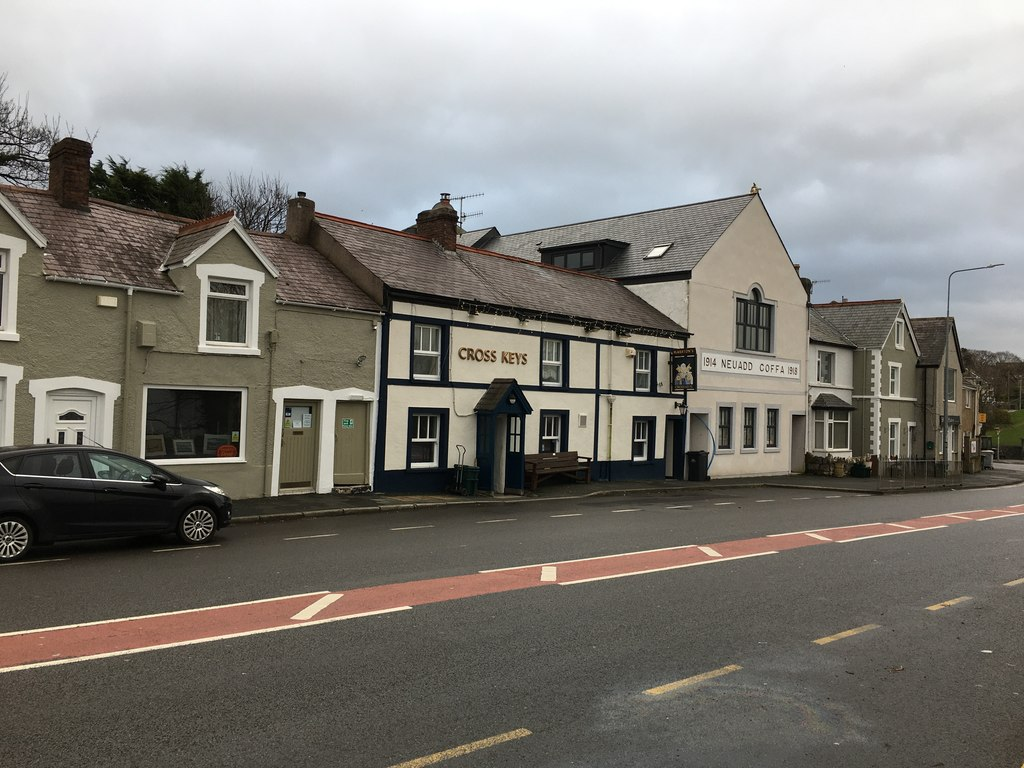
- Main A470 road through the village

- Location within Conwy
- Population: 2,196 (2011)
- OS grid reference: SH8075
- Community: Llansanffraid Glan Conwy
- Principal area: Conwy
- Preserved county: Clwyd
- Country: Wales
- Sovereign state: United Kingdom
- Post town: COLWYN BAY
- Postcode district: LL28
- Dialling code: 01492
- Police: North Wales
- Fire: North Wales
- Ambulance: Welsh
- UK Parliament: Bangor Aberconwy
- Senedd Cymru – Welsh Parliament: Bangor Conwy Môn
- Website: www.llansanffraid.co.uk
- List of places UK Wales Conwy 53.268°N 3.796°W Map of the community

Llansanffraid Glan Conwy (Welsh pronunciation: [ɬansanˈfrai̯d ˌɡlan ˈkɔnʊɨ̯]), usually shortened to Glan Conwy, is a village, community and electoral ward in Conwy County Borough, Wales. The name translates from the Welsh as Church of St Ffraid on the bank of the River Conwy. The village was founded in the 5th century and in the past had a marine-based economy, but it is now largely residential. The population was 2,290 in 2001, reducing to 2,196 at the 2011 census. It includes the village of Pentrefelin.

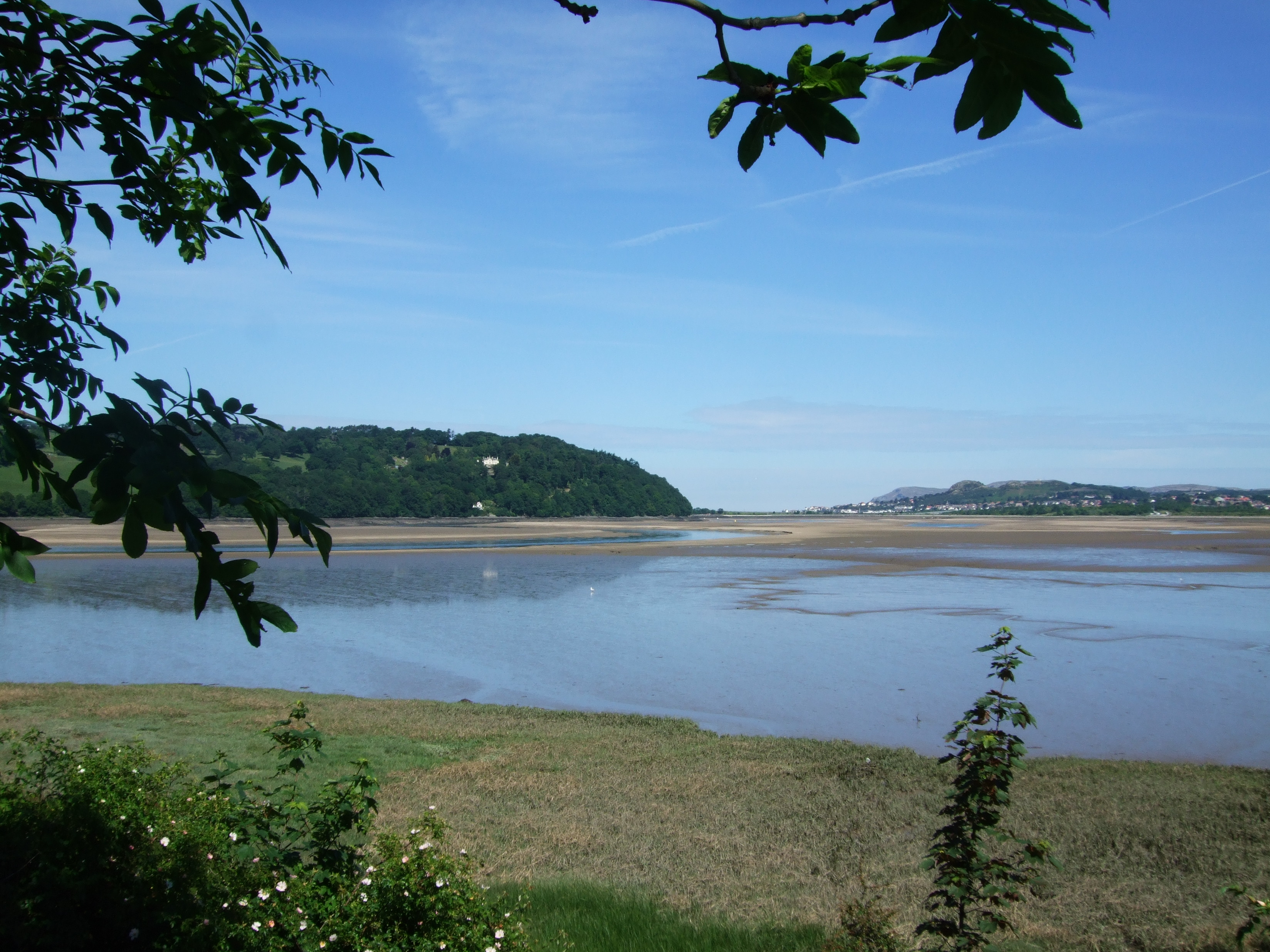
The Conwy River estuary

== Location ==
Llansanffraid Glan Conwy faces the town of Conwy across the estuary of the River Conwy and is located 5 miles south of Llandudno and 1 mile south of Llandudno Junction which is on the London to Holyhead main railway line. The A470 trunk road runs through the village. The trunk road is officially known as the Glan Conwy Corner to Cardiff trunk road.

== History ==
The parish was founded, according to tradition, when St. Bridget (Ffraid) is supposed to have sailed from Ireland on a green turf, and landed on a bank of the River Conwy, about a quarter of a mile west of the present church. However records show that the parish was created by Maelgwyn Gwynedd in the 5th century and that five royal manors were given to the church to create the parish. These are remembered in the five townships which survive today, the townships of Trellan, Trebwll, Tre Trallwyn, Tre Deunant and Pen y Rhos. The village has one public house, the Cross Keys Inn. It previously had two, the other being The Estuary, previously named the Conwy Vale before a change of ownership in 2007, and in the 1920s was the Wheatsheaf. The building has since been demolished.

=== Places of worship ===
In 1905, the following nonconformist places of worship were to be found in the civil parish of Llansanffraid Glan Conwy:

Name of chapel	Denomination	Number of "adherents"
Salem Fforddlas	Baptist	250
Bryn Ebenezer	Calvinistic Methodist	250
Croesengan	Calvinistic Methodist	60
Moriah	Calvinistic Methodist	100
Bryn Rhys	Congregationalist	69
Carmel	Wesleyan	35
Tyn'y Celyn	Wesleyan	36

All but Salem Fforddlas and Bryn Ebenezer are now closed.

=== Notable buildings ===
Bryn Eisteddfod is a Grade II listed building which overlooks the river to the north of the village. Its gardens and grounds are listed at Grade II* on the Cadw/ICOMOS Register of Parks and Gardens of Special Historic Interest in Wales.

== Government ==
The Llansanffraid Glan Conwy Community Council is made up of twelve members, six from each of the two wards, Bryn Rhys and Fforddlas. It represents the local people and is responsible for undertaking local projects.

== Education ==
Ysgol Glan Conwy is a rural primary school set in the village. Described as a “daily, bilingual, co-educational school” with 117 children aged from 3 to 11 years. The current Headteacher is Mrs Eifiona Price-Williams. The school's web address is: https://glanconwy.conwy.sch.uk

== Economy ==
The village's main industry used to be dry docking and chandlery for the port of Conwy. When the Telford (1826) and Stephenson (1848) bridges were built the village was cut off from the high seas and began a period of decline. Today it is a dormitory village, the vast majority of the population either being retirees or people who commute to work. The Cae Ffwt Business Park, located alongside the A470, has seen a number of small businesses set up base in the village.

== Transport ==
The village is served by Glan Conwy railway station on the Conwy Valley line. From the station, Transport for Wales provide direct trains northbound to Llandudno Junction, however the majority of northbound services continue to Llandudno, and southbound to Blaenau Ffestiniog.

At Llandudno Junction, passengers can change for direct trains to London, Holyhead, Crewe, Shrewsbury, Birmingham, Manchester and Cardiff. At Blaenau Ffestiniog, passengers can change for the Ffestiniog Heritage Railway to Porthmadog.

== Sport ==
The village has a local football team associated with the Welsh Alliance "Glan Conwy FC". The club is managed by Howard Vaughan.

== See also ==
- Glan Conwy railway station
- Glan Conway Rural District
