= 1895–96 Welsh Cup =

The 1895–96 Welsh Cup was a knock-out football competition contested by teams from Wales. Bangor City F.C. defeated Wrexham F.C. in the final by a score of 3–1.

== First round ==
=== Division One ===
Bangor City	3–1 (a.e.t.)	Llandudno Swifts	Maes-y-Dre; Bangor

Westminster Rovers	1–0	Flint

Mold Red Star	1–3	Carnarvon Ironopolis

Source: Welsh Football Data Archive

=== Division two ===
Wrockwardine Wood	2–0	Rhostyllen Victoria

Wellington St George	3–0	Rhos

Market Drayton	2–2	Wellington Town

Ironbridge	2–1^{1}	Druids

Source: Welsh Football Data Archive

^{1} Ironbridge dismissed for fielding un-registered players

==== Replay ====
Market Drayton	1–3	Wellington Town

Source: Welsh Football Data Archive

=== Division Three ===
Oswestry United	3–1	Llanidlois

Source: Welsh Football Data Archive

Aberystwyth Town receive a bye to the next round
Whitchurch receive a bye to the next round
Porthmadoc receive a bye to the next round

=== Division Four ===
Rhayader	2–1	Builth

Hereford	4–0	Rogerstone

Source: Welsh Football Data Archive

Cardiff A.F.C. scratched to Aberdare

== Second round ==
Westminster Rovers	w/o	Carnarvon Ironopolis

Druids	7–0	Wrockwardine Wood

Wellington St George	3–2	Wellington Town

Whitchurch	3–4	Aberystwyth Town

Source: Welsh Football Data Archive

Porthmadoc scratch to Oswestry United
Rhayader scratch to Hereford
Bangor receive a bye to the next round
Aberdare receive a bye to the next round

== Third round ==
Bangor City	1–1	Westminster Rovers

Druids	2–2	Wellington St George

Oswestry United	3–4	Aberystwyth Town

Aberdare	2–4	Hereford

Source: Welsh Football Data Archive

=== Replay ===
Bangor City	3–1	Westminster Rovers

Druids	0–3	Wellington St George

Source: Welsh Football Data Archive

== Fourth round ==
Brymbo Institute	2–3	Aberystwyth Town

Wrexham	4–0	Chirk AAA

Hereford	0–0	Newtown

Bangor City	1–1	Wellington St George

Source: Welsh Football Data Archive

=== Replay ===
Bangor City	4–0	Wellington St George

Hereford	3–1	Newtown

Source: Welsh Football Data Archive

== Semi-final ==
Newtown	1–1	Bangor City	Racecourse Ground; Wrexham
C Parry 40'		J Roberts

Wrexham	1–0	Aberystwyth Town	Welshpool
T Owen 15'

Source: Welsh Football Data Archive

=== Replay ===
Newtown	0–3	Bangor City	Racecourse Ground; Wrexham
		T Thomas; J Roberts; C Jones

Source: Welsh Football Data Archive

.

== Final ==
6 April 1896
15:30

Bangor	3–1	Wrexham
T Thomas 5', C Jones, J Roberts		Pugh

Council Field, Llandudno
Attendance: 7,000
Referee: Mr Brodie (Wolverhampton)

Bangor.	Wrexham
