= 1878–79 Aston Villa F.C. season =

Aston Villa
1878–79 season

The 1878–79 English football season was Aston Villa's 5th season, ten years before the creation of the Football League, and the year before the Football Club's first entry into the FA Cup draw. Aston Villa had a brilliant season and were only beaten twice; first by the second team of the Queen’s Park, and secondly in the Birmingham Cup by local rivals, Aston Unity.

Originally team captains would consult each other in order to resolve any dispute on the pitch. This role was now delegated to an umpire. Each team would bring their own partisan umpire allowing the team captains to concentrate on the game.

== Birmingham Senior Cup ==
Aston Unity	1–0	Aston Villa	Trinity Ground
			Attendance: 1,700
Note: In the 1878–79 first round of the Birmingham Senior Cup, Aston Unity beat Villa in the in front of a crowd of 1,700 at the Trinity Ground. According to Archie Hunter: "The team was captained by Butler, who played a splendid game as full back; but, unhappily, he was overtaken by a terrific infliction, resulting in the total loss of his eyesight, and it is said that he will never recover from his blindness. Before him Hundy was captain, and the club remained very strong, and, as I have said, they beat in the first cup tie." "...Aston Unity were too strong for us. I may mention one incident in our match with them which shows how players are sometimes carried away by excitement. While I shot for goal the ball skimmed the bar, and the Unity goalkeeper immediately caught me round the neck, held me fast, and seemed about to deliver a tremendous blow at my face. Everybody saw it; but my rival recovered himself in time, and afterwards offered me the fullest explanation of his action. I am quite convinced that he had no deliberate intention of doing me any personal injury; he simply lost his self-control for a moment, and was unable to restrain himself. In football there are many temptations of this sort, and it require a great amount of good heartedness and coolness to restrain from taking advantage of the proximity of an opponent. But the best players see their faces very sternly against roughness of all kinds, and some of the finest footballers I know are the most generous and good-natured of men on the field. I don’t think much advantage is ever gained by bad temper or spiteful play. If one man is rough, another recriminates; and if one side shows bad blood, the other side is sure to have its bad blood stirred up also. You can play to win, and play with perfect fairness; that is my experience."

== Friendlies ==
Burton Robin Hood	0–2	Aston Villa	Burton
Note: Archie Hunter made his debut: “The first match in which I played for the Villa –and the first I ever played in England – was rather remarkable. It was called a ‘friendly’ match, but that term must only be considered in the professional sense. It was the most unfriendly affair in which I ever took part. Our opponents were the Burton Robin Hoods, and we Villa men journeyed to Burton to meet them. It was quite evident to us from the beginning that nobody in Burton wanted us to win that match, and that they were determined to do their best to prevent our succeeding. We didn’t have a very good reception, and whenever we played up well there was a bowl of disapprobation from the spectators. We went on all the same, and were not going to be intimidated; and, as a matter of fact, we soon showed that we were superior to our rivals. When we scored our first goal the blood of the Robin Hoods began to get up. They played a rough game, but we put it down to excitement and went on. I can’t say it was altogether enjoyable, because it is one thing to have a hard fight and another thing to fight like savages. Well, presently we scored a second goal, and that stirred up the rage of the Robin Hoods more than ever, and the wrath of the spectators was as a consuming fire. What do you think the people did? They got between the goal posts – some hundreds of them – forming a solid background, and presently when a goal shot was made the ball rebounded back into play, and the Robin Hoods claimed that no goal had been scored. That was all very well for them, but we disagreed. It was ‘Evergreen’ Sammy Law, the centre forward, who had made the winning kick, and we rallied round him; but the umpire would not allow the goal, so as a protest, we left the field. I was not sorry to get away, for during the course of the game one of the Burton players had so far lost control of himself that he made sudden dashes in my directions, and chased me all over the field. He had his sleeves turned up, and every time he came near me he doubled up his fists in a very ominous manner. I thought he meant business, but fortunately I was able to avoid him, and escaped with my life.” “What had you done to incur his anger?” “Well, I suppose I hadn’t let him take the ball from me, you see, and had been making rings round him. He was evidently a disappointed man, and wanted to show me the evil consequences of playing as well as I could for my own side. But I wasn’t disposed to take a lesson. Yes, it was a very queer match altogether, especially for a ‘friendly’ one. But it was the only one of the sort I played. Being my first match in England of course it gave me a rather bad impression of how things went on over here, but subsequently events caused me to alter my opinion.” Each team would bring their own partisan umpire allowing the team captains to concentrate on the game. In 1881, the referee, a third "neutral" official was added; this referee would be "referred to" if the umpires could not resolve a dispute.

Aston Villa	22–0	Small Heath Swifts	Wellington Road
Note: According to Archie Hunter: "in the match against the Small Heath Swifts we won by 22 goals to none; and some humourist fetched our goalkeeper, Copley, a chair to sit upon, as he had nothing at all to do, and was getting tired of standing and never having a chance of a kick."

19 October 1878	Aston Villa	4–0	Rushall Rovers	Perry Barr
				Stadium: Wellington Road
Note:

26 October 1878	Aston Villa	v	Shrewsbury Engineers	Perry Barr
				Stadium: Wellington Road
Note:

16 November 1878	Aston Villa	2–1	West Bromwich	Perry Barr
				Stadium: Wellington Road
Note:

23 November 1878	The Birmingham Club	1–2	Aston Villa	Aston
				Stadium: Aston Lower Grounds
Note:

7 December 1878	Aston Villa	2–0	Sneiton Wanderers	Perry Barr
				Stadium: Wellington Road
Note:

27 December 1878	Stoke	v	Aston Villa	Stoke
Note:

4 January 1879	Rushall Rovers	v	Aston Villa	Walsall
Note:

11 January 1879	West Bromwich	0–2	Aston Villa	West Bromwich
Note:

18 January 1879	Sheffield Heeley	v	Aston Villa	Sheffield
Note:

20 January 1879	Aston Villa	1–2	Queens Park 2nd	Perry Barr
	C.Hughes			Stadium: Wellington Road
Note: The morning of the match it was reported that the snow had been cleared from the pitch. Despite this, the match was played in several inches of snow The "match had been arranged through the personal influence of Mr. Ramsay, who knew Glasgow men well, and who was then upon a holiday. He tried to get their first team down, but Captain Charles Campbell told him they had better to take the second team first, and if we could beat them he would arrange for their first team to visit us the following year."

25 January 1879	Aston Villa	2–0	The Birmingham Club	Perry Barr
				Stadium: Wellington Road
Note:

1 February 1879	Aston Villa	0–0	St George's	Perry Barr
				Stadium: Wellington Road
Note:

8 February 1879	Sneiton Wanderers	2–4	Aston Villa	Nottingham
				Stadium: Meadows Ground
Note: Victory in the rain.

22 February 1879	Aston Villa	8–0	Arcadians	Perry Barr
				Stadium: Wellington Road
Note:

1 March 1879	Wednesbury Old Athletic	v	Aston Villa	Wednesbury
Note:

1 March 1879	Shrewsbury Engineers	v	Aston Villa	Shrewsbury
Note:

1 March 1879	Aston Villa 2nd	5–0	Sutton Coldfield	Perry Barr
				Stadium: Wellington Road
Note:

8 March 1879	Aston Villa	v	Sheffield Heeley	Perry Barr
				Stadium: Wellington Road
Note:

15 March 1879	Aston Villa	v	The Birmingham Club 2nd	Perry Barr
				Stadium: Wellington Road
Note:

22 March 1879	Stafford Road	0–1	Aston Villa	Wolverhampton
Note:

29 March 1879	Aston Villa	v	Saltley College	Perry Barr
				Stadium: Wellington Road
Note:

5 April 1879	Aston Villa	3–0	Wednesbury Old Athletic	Perry Barr
				Stadium: Wellington Road
Note:

3 May 1879	Aston Villa	1–1	Stoke	Stoke

== Players ==
Archie Hunter signed for Villa in August 1878. Hunter later recalled in his memoirs;

Aston Villa to me as a club that had come rapidly to the fore and asked me to become a member of it. I hesitated for some time, but at last my friend told me that a "brother Scot," Mr. George Ramsay, was the Villa captain and that decided me. Mr. Ramsay was a Glasgow man and had exerted himself very considerably to bring the Villa team into the front rank.

— Archie Hunter, Triumphs of the Football Field

== Cricket & Athletics ==
The Aston Villa Cricket Club commenced its season on 19 April with a victory over an all-England team.

In June 1879, Birchfield Harriers held their first annual athletics meeting at the Aston Lower Grounds, attended by 4,000 despite the unfavourable weather. Villa's Tommy Pank placed first in the final heat of the one-mile bicycle handicap. Under captain George Ramsay, the six man Aston Villa Football Club lost to West Bromwich Gymnastics Club in the tug of war competition.
