= William Dyas =

English cricketer

Personal information
- Full name: William George Dyas
- Born: 6 November 1872; Madeley, Shropshire, England
- Died: 14 January 1940 (aged 67); Madeley, Shropshire, England
- Batting: Unknown
- Bowling: Unknown

Domestic team information
- Years: Team
- 1901–1902: London County

Career statistics
Competition	First-class
Matches	4
Runs scored	136
Batting average	22.66
100s/50s	–/1
Top score	83
Balls bowled	228
Wickets	2
Bowling average	34.00
5 wickets in innings	–
10 wickets in match	–
Best bowling	1/16
Catches/stumpings	–/–
- Source: Cricinfo, 30 December 2021

William George Dyas MBE (6 November 1872 – 14 January 1940) was an English first-class cricketer, as well as footballer, businessman and local politician in Shropshire.

== Early life ==
Dyas was born in November 1872 at Madeley, Shropshire, son of farmer and maltster Andrew Beacall Dyas, whose family of Dutch extraction migrated to England in the reign of William III, and his wife Mary Anne, daughter of George Legge. He was educated at the nearby Wellington College (now Wrekin College).

== Cricket ==
An early figure in Shropshire cricket, having played for the county since 1892, Dyas was on the staff of Warwickshire by 1901. He did not play first-class cricket for Warwickshire, but did play four first-class matches for London County, captained by W. G. Grace; he made three appearances in 1901, followed by one in 1902. He scored 136 runs in his four matches, at an average of 22.66. His highest score of 83, which was his only half century in first-class cricket, came against the Marylebone Cricket Club (M.C.C.) in 1901. He also took 3 wickets with the ball.

Below first class level he played county level cricket for Shropshire until 1904. In twelve years' play for the county he made 1,442 runs in 39 matches, achieved four centuries with his highest score in a match of 169 runs (against the M.C.C.) and taking 87 wickets. After the county club disbanded, he continued to play for the Gentlemen of Shropshire team which replaced it. He played at club level for Madeley, which he captained for seven years, and Shifnal.

== Football ==
Dyas was also an active footballer between 1890 and 1903, when he played for Ironbridge F.C. in position of right-wing forward, appearing for them against Aston Villa in play for the Birmingham Senior Cup, and in a combined Shropshire team against Blackburn Rovers for the benefit of the Shropshire County League in 1902. He was invited to join West Bromwich Albion as an inside-right at the end of the 1894-95 season but declined due to business commitments. He also played locally for football clubs at Wrockwardine Wood and Wellington St George's.

== Other sports ==
Dyas also played hockey, at which he was a representative player for Shropshire, The Midlands (on eleven occasions, captaining their team in 1904-05), and England against Scotland in 1903. He was President and Secretary of the Shropshire Hockey Association in 1907. He also owned racing pigeons and was president of Madeley Homing Club.

== Business and public life ==
Dyas was involved in the clay industry in Shropshire, having joined and become a partner by 1907 in the roofing tile-making firm of George Legge & Son (owned by his maternal family) at Broseley. He later became chairman of another tile manufacturers, Messrs. Maw and Company of Jackfield, the Nuway Mat Company of Coalport, Shropshire, and the Arenig Granite Company at Bala.

Dyas served in local public and political life mainly as a member representing Madeley as a Conservative on Wenlock Borough Council, to which he was first elected in 1904 and served, latterly as Alderman, until his death. He was Mayor of Wenlock four times, in 1919-20, 1923–24, 1925–26 and 1928-29. He was also a Justice of the Peace for the borough magistrates. He also represented Madeley as member of Shropshire County Council for 16 years, was a chairman of governors of Coalbrookdale High School.

In the First World War Dyas served as superintendent of local munitions magazines in Shropshire, for which he was awarded the M.B.E. after the war.

== Death ==
After suffering in his last three years from asthma and bronchitis, he died after a chill contracted while field shooting near Ludlow, at his home at Upper House, Madeley in January 1940 and was buried at Madeley Parish Church, of which he had been a churchwarden and church treasurer. He was unmarried.
