= 1880–81 Birmingham Senior Cup =

Tournament details
- Country: England
- Venue: Midlands

Final positions
- Champions: Walsall Swifts
- Runners-up: Aston Villa

The 1880–81 Birmingham Senior Cup was the fifth season of the Birmingham Senior Cup, the oldest county cup competition still active and the third oldest association football competition in the world overall.

The holders, Aston Villa, again reached the final, progressing past Newport (Salop) in the first round and beating Sutton Coldfield 10–1 in the second. In the final they were beaten 1–0 by Walsall Swifts.

== First round ==
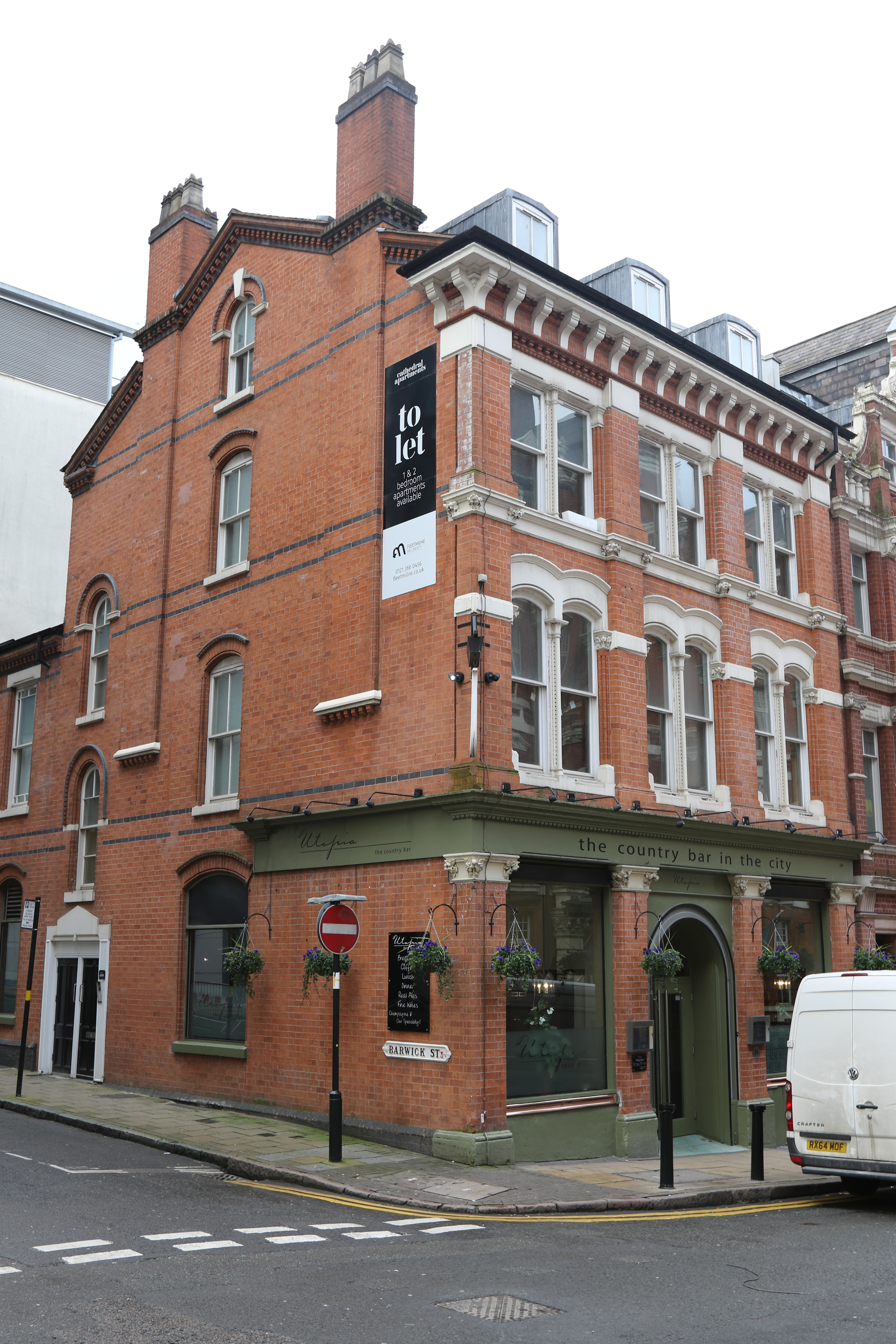
Site of Nock's Hotel, Church Street

The committee of the Birmingham & District Football Association convened at Nock's Hotel on 8 September 1880 and the ties for the first round of the Birmingham Senior Cup were drawn.

The cup-holders, Aston Villa, began the competition with a 6–0 victory away to Newport (Salop) on 6 November despite having to divide their squad as they also had a Staffordshire Senior Cup match scheduled for the same day. Walsall Swifts opened their campaign with an emphatic 16–0 victory over Harborne (one source says 15–0). Wednesbury Old Athletic had what the Walsall Observer called an "absurdly easy" victory over Walsall Albion, winning 15–0 despite finishing the game with only ten players due to an injury. The Birmingham Mail predicted that the match between Small Heath Alliance and Stoke would be "a close affair", but in the event Small Heath won 6–1. Aston Unity took a 1–0 lead in the first half against Westminster in a game impacted by high winds; Westminster thought they had equalised shortly after the break but the goal was disallowed and Unity subsequently scored three more goals.

- Derby Town 4–0 Pickwick
- All Saint's (Darlaston) 1–2 Notts Wanderers
- Stafford Road 3–1 Bloxwich (one source says 3–0)
- Excelsior 7–2 Walsall Athletic (one source says 7–0)
- West Bromwich 4–3 St Luke's
- Birmingham Heath 2–3 Holmes (Sheffield)
- Walsall Albion 0–15 Wednesbury Old Athletic
- Aston Unity 4–0 Westminster
- Walsall Swifts 16–0 Harborne (one source says 15–0)
- Small Heath Alliance 6–1 Stoke
- Calthorpe 2–2 Perry Athletic
- Arcadians 2–3 Sutton Coldfield
- Birmingham v Walsall White Star - Birmingham withdrew
- Hamstead 0–4 Wednesbury Strollers
- Wretham 0–4 Chesterfield Spital (one source says 1–4)
- Aston Clifton 0–6 Walsall Town (one source says 1–6)
- St George's 0–5 Elwell's (one source says 2–5)
- Christ Church (West Bromwich) 1–1 Heath Town (Wolverhampton)
- Newport (Salop) 0–6 Aston Villa
- St Thomas's v Royal - Royal withdrew
- Saltley College - bye

The drawn matches were replayed. Heath Town raised a protest following their replay against Christ Church and the match was ordered to be played again at a neutral venue.

- Calthorpe 7–0 Perry Athletic
- Christ Church (West Bromwich) v Heath Town (Wolverhampton) - match declared null and void
- Christ Church (West Bromwich) 2–4 Heath Town (Wolverhampton)

Birmingham Heath lodged a protest following their defeat to Holmes. At the next meeting of the Association, the committee voted to expel Holmes from the competition and reinstate their opponents. St George's raised a protest after their loss to Elwell's but it was rejected.

== Second round ==
The second round draw took place on 24 November. Stafford Road protested against playing St Thomas's on the latter's ground so to resolve the issue it was played at a neutral venue.

Saltley College, the previous season's beaten finalists, entered the competition, having received a bye in the first round, and beat Heath Town (Wolverhampton) 9–0 (one source says 8–0). Their captain, Johnson, scored six of the goals. Aston Villa became the third team in the competition to run up double figures, beating Sutton Coldfield 10–1. Wednesbury Old Athletic beat Derby by "five goals and one disputed to one", Holden and Morley being their best players.

- Saltley College 9–0 Heath Town (Wolverhampton) (one source says 8–0)
- Notts Wanderers 1–2 West Bromwich
- Elwell's 5–1 Excelsior (one source says 5–2)
- Wednesbury Strollers 1–5 Walsall Swifts
- Birmingham Heath 2–5 Aston Unity
- Calthorpe 1–1 Chesterfield Spital
- Stafford Road 1–0 St Thomas's
- Wednesbury Old Athletic 6–1 Derby
- Aston Villa 10–1 Sutton Coldfield
- Walsall Town 2–2 Walsall White Star
- Small Heath Alliance - bye

The drawn matches were replayed.

- Calthorpe 0–10 Chesterfield Spital
- Walsall Town 4–1 Walsall White Star (one source says 4–3)

== Third round ==
The third round draw took place on 22 December.

West Bromwich beat Saltley College 1–0 in the final match of the round but had two further goals disallowed for infringements.

- Walsall Swifts 3–0 Walsall Town
- Small Heath Alliance 6–4 Aston Unity
- Chesterfield Spital 5–1 Elwells (one source says 4–1)
- WOAC 3–1 Stafford Road
- Saltley College 0–1 West Bromwich
- Aston Villa - bye

== Fourth round ==
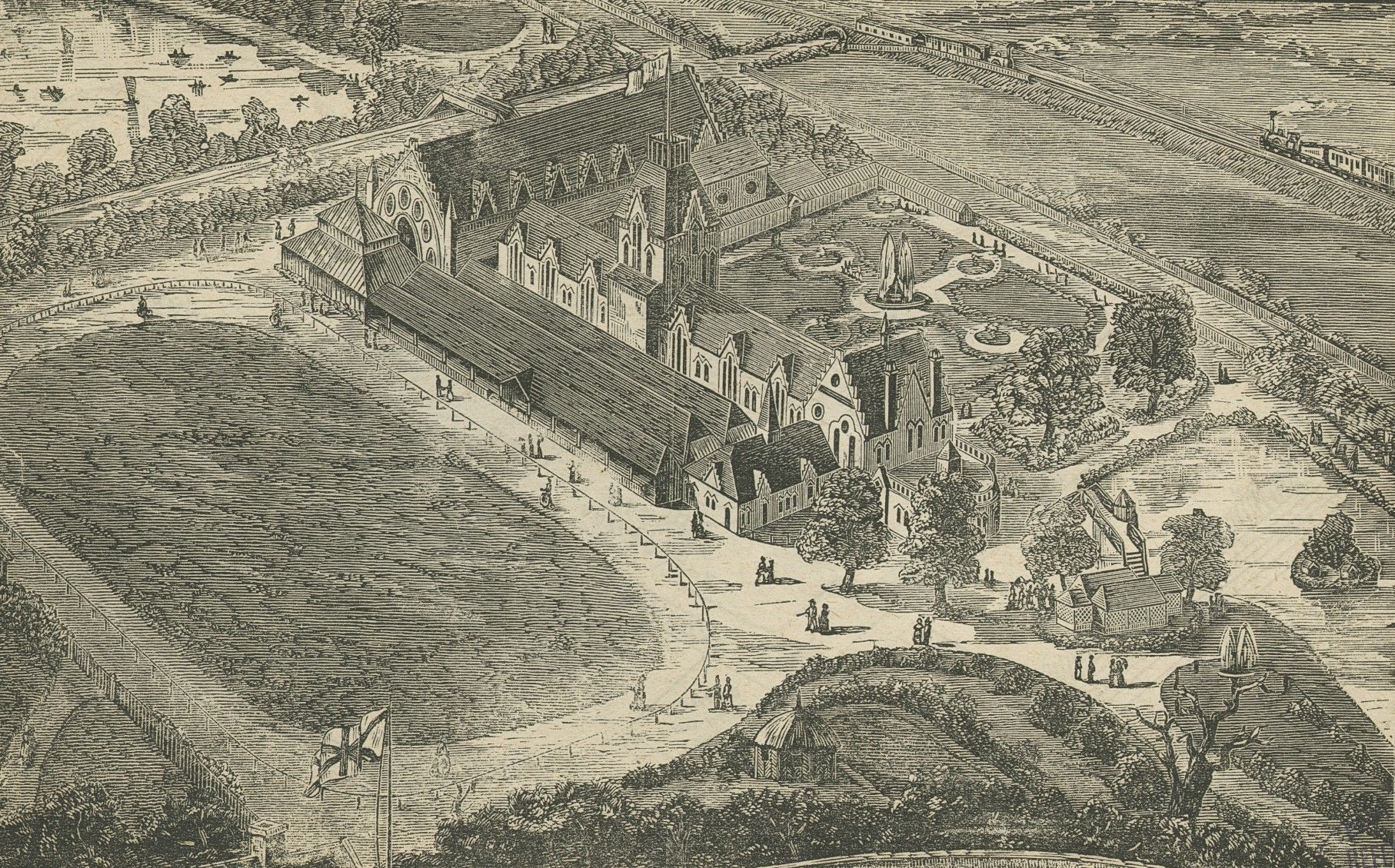
The Aston Lower Grounds hosted several fourth round matches.

The fourth round draw took place on 2 February.

West Bromwich beat Chesterfield Spital at the Aston Lower Grounds in a match played in front of a very small crowd in "very miserable" weather. Aston Villa's match against Wednesbury Old Athletic also took place at the Lower Grounds and drew a crowd of 12,000, the largest ever recorded at the venue. The Birmingham Mail reported that the Wednesbury players appeared "well-trained" but that their opponents were superior in every way and that their "dodging, dribbling and passing, combined with superior speed, quite over-matched the Wednesbury men".

- West Bromwich 2–1 Chesterfield Spital (one source says 2–0)
- Aston Villa 6–0 Wednesbury Old Athletic
- Walsall Swifts 2–2 Small Heath Alliance

The Walsall Swifts v Small Heath Alliance match was replayed at the Aston Lower Grounds. The Swifts dominated the game from start to end, scoring twice in each half without reply. The reporter for The Midland Athlete wrote that the game was "pleasantly contested throughout and remarkably free from dispute and roughness".

- Walsall Swifts 4–0 Small Heath Alliance

== Semi-finals ==
The draw for the semi-finals took place on 23 March. With three teams remaining, one would receive a bye into the final, which turned out to be Walsall Swifts. At the same meeting it was confirmed that each player on the team winning the final would receive a gold medal, and the players on the teams defeated in both the final and the sole semi-final would receive silver medals. The semi-final match was played in poor conditions and the reporter for The Midland Athlete wrote that the high winds "completely spoilt what might have been a first-class match".

- Aston Villa 2–0 West Bromwich
- Walsall Swifts - bye

== Final ==
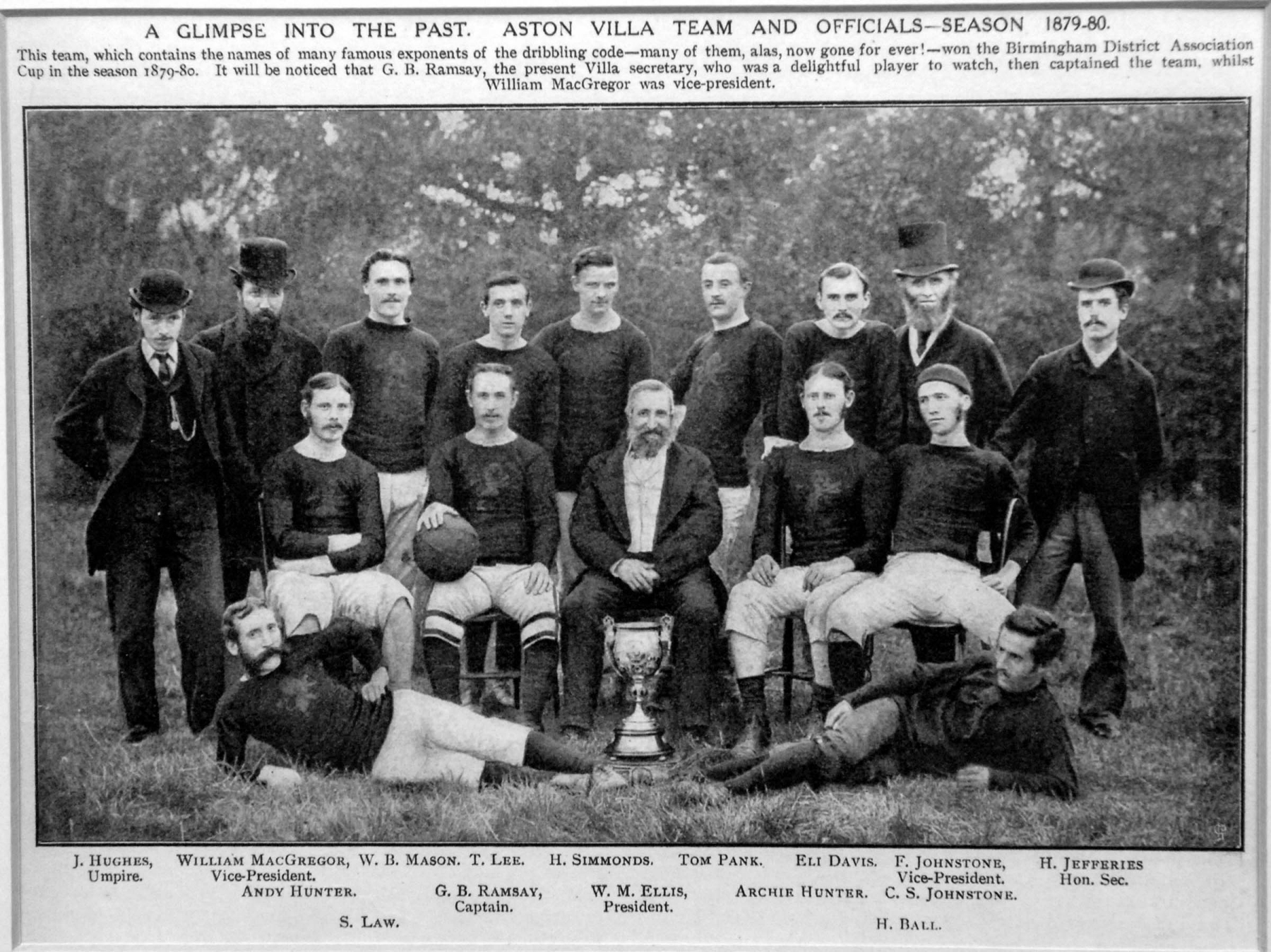
Aston Villa, pictured with the trophy they won in 1880, were the defending champions. Six of the players depicted also played in the 1881 final.

The final took place on 11 April 1881 at the Aston Lower Grounds. On the way to the match the Swifts players experienced "an awkward spill from a brake". Several players were bruised and one of their best forwards, Brandrick, was so severely hurt that he was forced to miss the game. As a result of the incident, the game kicked off 20 minutes later than scheduled.

Villa's Andy Hunter had the first goalscoring chance but he missed the target. His brother Archie subsequently defended well against a Swifts attack. Villa continued to press their opponents but the Swifts defended well. The Hunter brothers made further attacks for Villa and W. Yates did the same for Walsall. The Swifts players attacked en masse and Villa's goalkeeper, George Copley, ran out of his goal; the ball was kicked into the goal but the goal was disallowed due to an offside infringement. A similar incident occurred ten minutes before half-time but on this occasion the goal stood, giving Swifts a 1–0 lead at half-time.

After the interval, the Swifts put up a strong defence and were able to prevent their opponents from scoring. The Midland Athlete wrote that the Hunter brothers and several of their teammates "played like demons" but that the "magnificent" play of Swifts' Sheldon and Jones "baffled all [their] dodges and attacks". In the latter stages of the games, the Walsall players adopted a strategy of repeatedly kicking the ball out of play to waste time, which drew disapproval from the crowd. The match ended in a 1–0 victory for Walsall, a result which the Lichfield Mercury described as "most unexpected". The Walsall Observer wrote that "too much praise cannot be given our townsmen for the plucky and determined manner in which they played". The cup was not presented to the winning team until the Association's annual dinner on 29 April.

== Aftermath ==
The following week, Aston Villa and Walsall Swifts met again in the final of the Staffordshire Senior Cup at the Victoria Ground in Stoke-on-Trent. This time, Villa took the trophy, with Swifts handicapped by having to play a reserve goalkeeper, as Hobson had had his collarbone broken by the Villa forwards in the Senior Cup final.
