= Ironbridge F.C. =

Defunct football club from Shropshre, England

- Full name: Ironbridge Football Club
- Nicknames: the Ironsides, Iron/Men of Iron
- Founded: 1882
- Dissolved: 1903
- Ground: Hill Top
- Secretary: E. S. White
Home colours

Ironbridge Football Club was an association football club from Madeley, Shropshire, active around the turn of the 20th century.

== History ==
The earliest reference to the club is from the 1882–83 season. Especially in the 19th century, the club's name was rendered as Iron-Bridge.

Its first achievement of note was reaching the final of the Burslem Football Association Cup in 1884–85. In 1885–86, it won the South Shropshire Cup, and, following triumphs in the successive two seasons, retained the Cup in perpetuity.

=== 1887–88 Cup runs ===
In 1887–88, the Men of Iron reached the final of the Shropshire Senior Cup for the first time, losing 4–0 to Shrewsbury Town at the latter's Racecourse Ground, Ironbridge committing a tactical error from the off, as, despite winning the toss, it contradicted conventional wisdom by choosing to kick off into a driving wind and rain - and, turning around 2–0 behind, were too tired to retrieve the situation.

The same season, it entered the Birmingham Senior Cup for the first time, and in 1888–89, after a surprise win over Burton Swifts, and a walkover after Derby Midland preferred a friendly with Derby County on the tie's scheduled date, reached the semi-final of the Birmingham cup. At that stage it met Aston Villa at the latter's Wellington Road ground and went down 9–1, the Villans going on to win the final. The tie was meant to be played at Wolverhampton, but the Villans offered Ironbridge £20 and a friendly at Hill Top to switch to Aston, and the difference in the two sides was shown by the Villans including seven of the XI which played in the 1887 FA Cup Final, while the Ironsides' captain, Walter Baguley, was landlord of the All Nations pub in Madeley. The Men of Iron were also runner-up in the Wednesbury Charity Cup the same season.

=== Local leagues and Shropshire Cup success ===
In 1888–89, it was a founder member of the Birmingham and District League, although it struggled towards the bottom of the table, and in 1889–90 it was a founder member of the Shropshire League; it took the first title, and won the Shropshire Senior Cup for the first time. "Iron" beat holder Shrewsbury Town by an "unexpectedly large" 4–1 scoreline in the semi-final, and in the final at Monkmoor Road beat Oswestry 3–1 - this time, having won the toss, captain (and goalkeeper) Lister chose to kick with the wind, the Men of Iron turning around 2–0 to the good, and having the benefit of a drop in wind speed in the second half, although Iron forward Bethell (who had scored the third goal) had to go off with an injury close to the end. It won the Senior Cup a second time in 1891–92, its 6–1 win over Whitchurch setting a record for the biggest final victory; three weeks before, Ironbridge had beaten Whitchurch 11–0 in the Shropshire League.

=== National Cups ===
From 1892–93, the club started to enter the FA Cup, although in its six entries to 1901–02, it never got past the second qualifying round. It was also a regular entrant in the Welsh Cup, reaching the third round in the 1893–94 competition. In the 1895–96 Welsh Cup, it beat favourites Druids in the first round, but was expelled because of an administrative oversight - it had forgotten to register any of its players specifically for the competition.

=== Birmingham League and dissolution ===
It remained in the Shropshire League until it disbanded after the 1899–1900 season, which had seen the club's second consecutive championship. It also reached the semi-final of the Birmingham Senior Cup in 1899–1900 for a second time. The club was again unlucky to be drawn away, this time at Burslem Port Vale, and lost 6–3. En route, the club enjoyed its biggest competitive win, 19–0 over Newport, due to its visitors having a conflicting engagement in the Shropshire League.

This helped the club re-join the Birmingham League in 1900, and was initially more successful than in its first stint, with two mid-table finishes. It also took a third and final Shropshire Senior Cup in 1901–02, with an easy 4–1 victory over Oswestry at Wellington. However, in 1902–03, it ran out of money, at one point not even having the funds to send the players to Hereford without players agreeing to forgo their wages, and the club finished bottom of the Birmingham League. Having failed in its re-election bid, the club proposed to bring back the Shropshire League. The suggestion was never taken up and the club was disbanded in September 1903. E. S. White, the club's honorary secretary and occasional chairman, tried to revive the club in 1905, and even secured a place in the Walsall & District League, but it was unable to secure a ground, and the committee disbanded. The next club with the Ironbridge name was Ironbridge United, formed in 1907.

== Colours ==
The club's original colours were scarlet and black, which the club resolved to change to black and gold from 1885–86. The club had adopted navy blue and maroon by the 1887–88 season.

By 1902, it was wearing black and red quartered shirts, which in the context of the times refers to counterchanged halves.

== Ground ==
The club played at the Hill Top ground.

== Notable players ==
- Notable players ( 2 )

The club's captain in 1894–95, W. G. Dyas, reportedly left for West Bromwich Albion at the end of the season, although he declined to play fully for the club for business reasons.

Thomas Lewis, utility midfielder, left the club for Wolverhampton Wanderers in August 1898.
