= 1880–81 Aston Villa F.C. season =

Aston Villa
1880–81 season
- Chairman: William McGregor
- FA Cup: 4th round

The 1880–81 English football season was Aston Villa's 2nd season in the Football Association Cup, the top-level football competition at the time. In 1881 Villa departed the FA Cup at the fourth-round stage.

In 1881 The referee is introduced to decide disputes between the umpires. The caution (for "ungentlemanly behaviour") and the sending-off (for violent conduct) appear in the laws for the first time.

In the April Staffordshire Cup final, Villa beat Walsall Swifts 4-1. Villa had previously beaten Elwell, Fenton and Goldenhill to reach the final.

== FA Cup ==
30 October 1880 1st Round	Aston Villa	5–3	Wednesbury Strollers
		Report
Note: Having avoided last season's opponent Stafford Road, in the first round, Villa faced only their second official opponent, Wednesbury Strollers. The club was considered a more upmarket side than the Wednesbury Old Athletic Club with generally richer patrons but less public support. There were season debuts for Howard Vaughton George Copley, Bill Watts and Arthur Brown.

4 December 1880 2nd Round	Nottingham Forest	1–2	Aston Villa
		Report
Note:

12 February 1881 3rd Round	Notts County	1–3	Aston Villa
		Report
Note:

19 February 1881 4th Round	Aston Villa	2–3	Stafford Road
		Report
Note: Villa's first official defeat came against the same team against whom they had achieved their first victory in the competition, Stafford Road.

== Birmingham Senior Cup ==
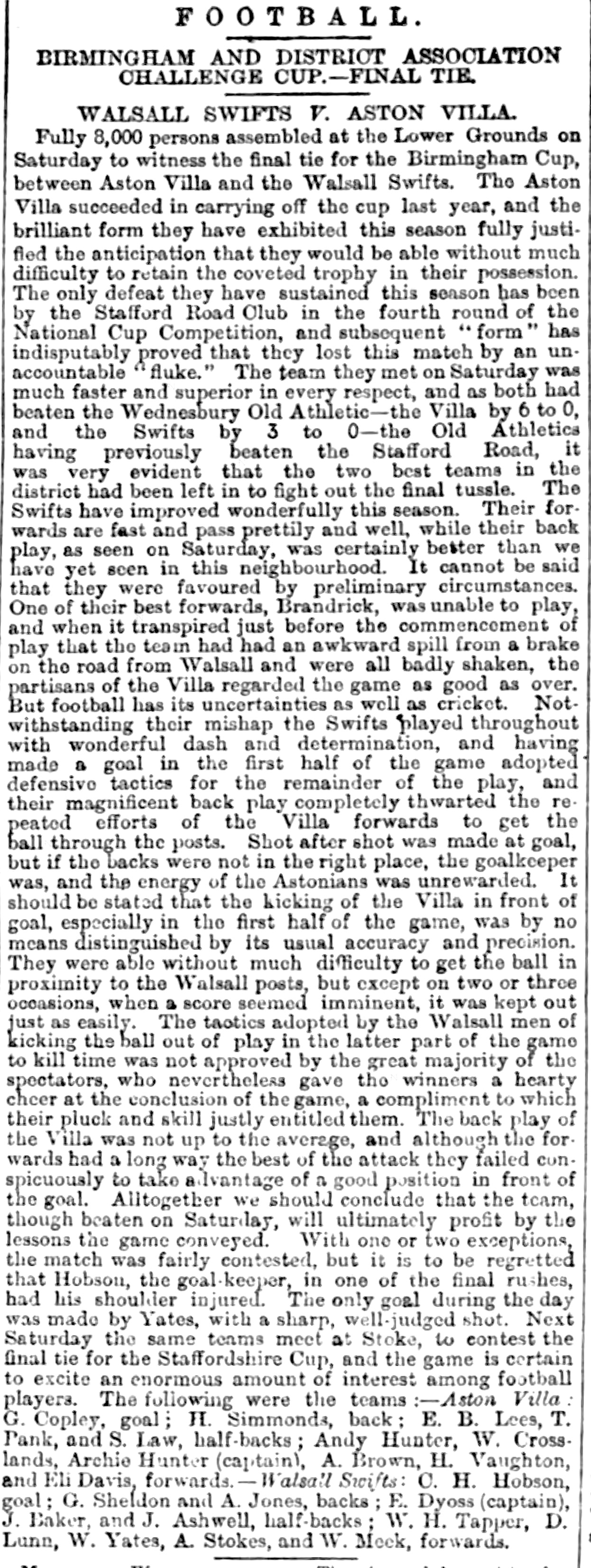
1880–81 Birmingham Senior Cup Final, Walsall Swifts 1–0 Aston Villa, Birmingham Evening Mail, 11 April 1881

Holders, Aston Villa participated in the 1880–81 Birmingham Senior Cup. They were runners-up to Walsall Swifts following a 1–0 defeat in the final at Aston Lower Grounds. Villa had progressed past Newport in the first round and had beat Sutton Coldfield 10-1 in the second.

Walsall Swifts gained a surprise 1–0 win over Villa in the final, to gain the club's greatest success. The following week, the sides met again in the final of the Staffordshire Senior Cup at Stoke. This time Villa took the trophy, with Swifts handicapped by having to play a reserve goalkeeper, as Hobson had had his collarbone broken by the Villa forwards in the Senior Cup final.

== Friendlies ==
On 16 August a match was arranged with Small Heath Alliance for the benefit of the John Skirrow Wright statue fund.
