= Wrockwardine Wood F.C. =

Football club from Shropshre, England

- Full name: Wrockwardine Wood Football Club
- Nickname: Wood
- Founded: 1890
- Ground: New Road
- League: Salop Leisure League
Home colours

Wrockwardine Wood Football Club is an English amateur football club based in Telford, Shropshire.

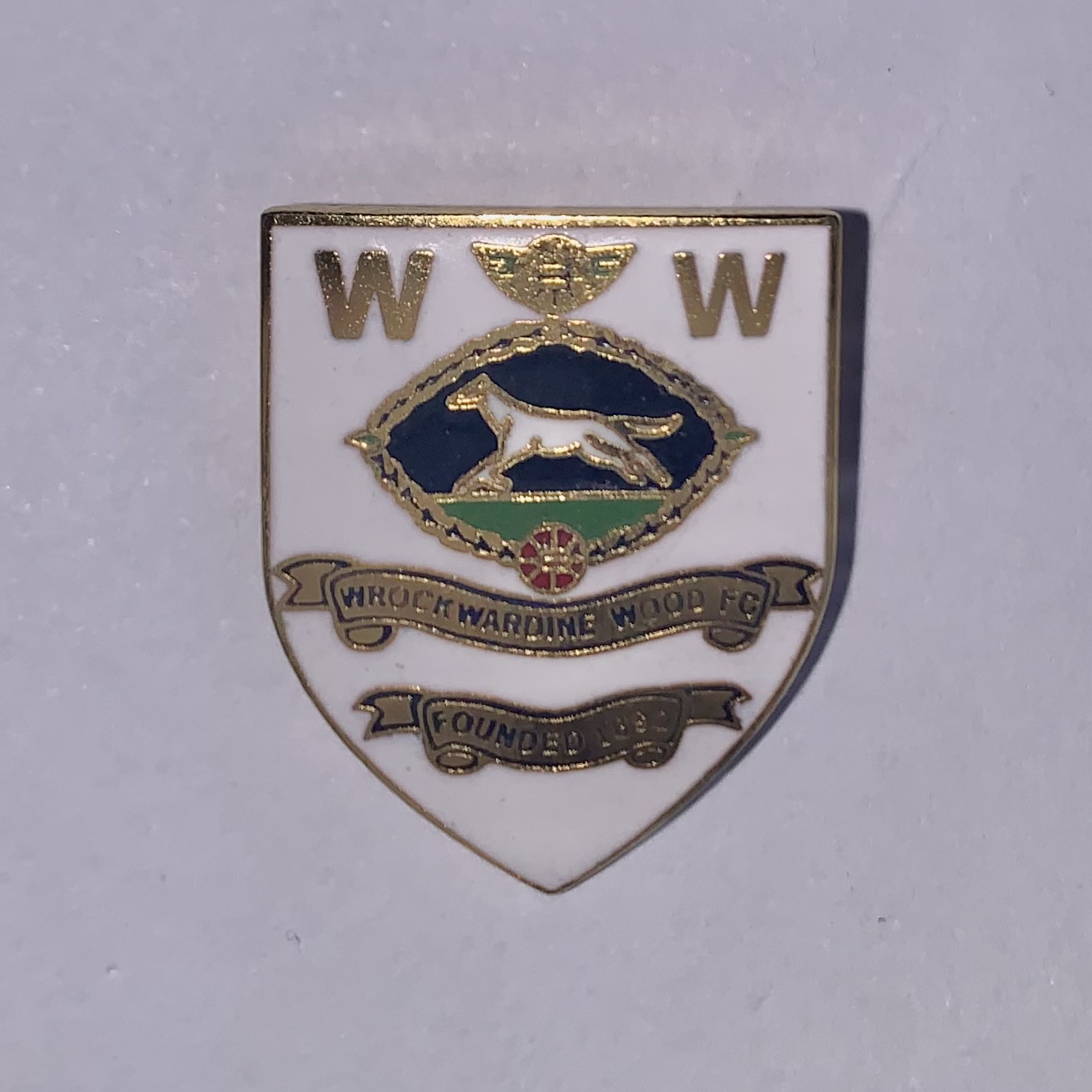
Wrockwardine Wood F.C. pin badge

== History ==
The club claims a foundation date of 1880, although older records suggest 1890 as being the correct date. It is the second-oldest current club in Shropshire, after Shrewsbury Town.

=== Early amateur days ===
The club's first successes came in winning the Shropshire Junior Cup in 1892–93 and 1893–94. In the former year, it was invited to play in the Shropshire Mayor's Charity Cup, but did not turn up to the semi-final with Shrewsbury Town, because it was double-booked with the Welsh Junior Cup final. The club lost the Welsh final 1–0 to Wrexham Gymnasium. It reached the Welsh Junior Cup final again in 1893–94, at Stansty Park, but again lost, 4–3 to Mold Red Stars; Wood had been 3–1 up at half-time.

=== Shropshire League and national Cups ===
It was a founder member of the Shropshire League in 1894–95, and was runner-up in 1895–96 and 1896–97. It competed in the FA Cup qualifying rounds in the 1890s, its greatest achievement being to reach the fourth (and final) qualifying round in 1895–96, the equivalent of the third round proper. En route the club eliminated Walsall 3–1 at home, a defeat considered "one of the worst defeats ever sustained by the Walsall Club...by a team that was scarcely thought worthy of serious consideration", with Wood's "three-and-sixpenny professionals" confounding the full-timers with a kick-and-rush game "peculiar to colliers and ironworkers". The club also knocked out Coventry City (then still called Singers) in the 1897–98 FA Cup qualifying rounds, the only goal a penalty resulting from the referee adjudging "illegal charging" at a corner, when the ball was still on its way over.

Wood also entered the Welsh Cup for the first time in 1894–95 Welsh Cup, its debut appearance being its best, as it beat Ironbridge in the first round and took Aberystwyth to extra-time in the second before bowing out. It also won its first round tie the following year, against Rhostyllen Victoria, and right-winger Howell gave the Woodmen the lead at Druids in the second round, but Druids equalized quickly, and ran riot, winning 7–1. Its last entry, in 1897–98, ended in a first round defeat at Market Drayton.

Its original run in the Shropshire League ended in the 1898–99 season; after 9 matches, the club was 6th out of 8 clubs, but it never played its 10th match. In April the club withdrew from the competition and its results were expunged.

=== 1910 revival ===
The club went into stasis for a decade, reviving in 1910, and it won the Wellington and Shrewsbury Leagues in its first season back; it originally used the name Wrockwardine Wood United, which the club had occasionally been called in the 1890s, although the United was not often mentioned and was dropped after the First World War. The costs of running a semi-professional side proved too great, and it abandoned the experiment in 1914. It joined the Stafford League in 1929–30, the Walsall & District League in 1934–35, and the Worcestershire Combination in 1937–38, finishing as runner-up in 1938–39.

=== Post-Second World War ===
The club suspended activities for the Second World War, and did not revive until the 1954–55 season, joining the Stafford County League. For many years was the only club from the county to enter the FA Amateur Cup, although it never got past the qualifying rounds.

It joined the West Midlands League in 1965–66, and, despite concerns that this would be too high a level for the club, it won the First Division (second tier) in its first season, and also won the Walsall Senior Cup for the first time in 1966–67. Wood retained the latter trophy in 1967–68, beating a Tamworth reserve side at Hednesford Town which had been bolstered by 6 first-team players. It reached a third final in four years in 1969–70, going down to Atherstone Town over two legs, winning the home 1–0 but conceding two second-half goals away from home.

=== Return to county football ===
Wood resigned from the competition at the end of the 1969–70 season for the Shropshire League. From 2001 to 2003 the club again played in the West Midlands League. In 2020–21 the club was one of the founder members of the Salop Leisure League, in which it remains as at 2025–26.

== Colours ==
From the 1920s to the 1950s the club wore white shirts and black shorts. From the sixties it adopted all blue.

== Ground ==
The club's ground is off New Road in Telford, with a social club at the Oakengates Leisure Centre. Its previous grounds include the Trench in Donnington, where it played in the 19th century, and the Recreation Ground behind the White Horse Inn, which it obtained on its 1954 revival.

== Notable figures ==
- Gordon Richards, multiple champion jockey and local resident, was the club's president in the 1930s.
- Notable players ( 6 )
