= Newport F.C. (Shropshire) =

Newport
- Full name: Newport Football Club
- Founded: 1871
- Dissolved: 1900
- Ground: Victoria Park
- Secretary: Arthur Thomas Ward, C. E. Peplow, Owen Blythe
Home colours

Newport Football Club was an association football club from Newport, Shropshire. In the 1880s the club was often referred to as Newport Town.

== History ==
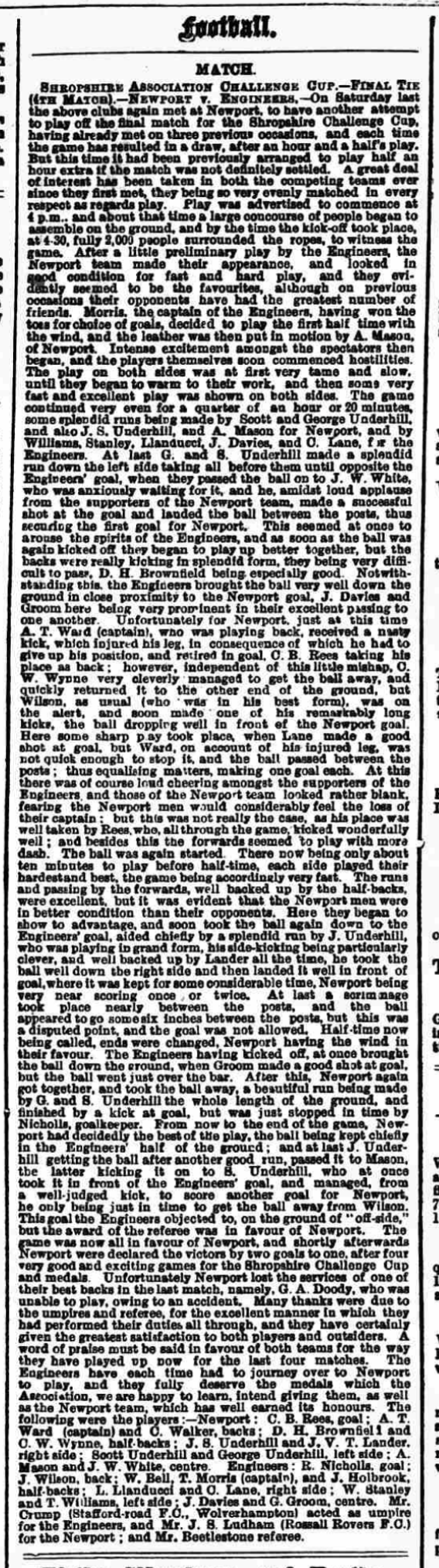
1878–79 Shropshire Association Cup Final Third Replay, Newport 2–1 Shrewsbury Engineers, Wellington Journal, 31 May 1879

The club's first reported match was in late 1871 and was to an unknown code, but one which included touchdowns. By 1872 Newport was playing against clubs which adhered to the association code.

Newport's first competitive match was in the first Shropshire Senior Cup in the 1877–78 season, losing to the Oswestry club. The club however bounced back to win the 1878–79 competition, beating Shrewsbury Engineers in the final. The original game ended in a 1–1 draw, the Engineers protesting vainly against both the Newport goal (holding the match up for 9 minutes) and the eligibility of one of the players, A replay also ended in a draw, the Engineers sitting back on an early Groom goal and conceding with 4 minutes remaining. The match was finally decided at the fourth attempt - by which time it had been agreed to play half-an-hour extra time if the 90 minutes ended level - in front of 2,000 spectators, this time the home side won 2–1, with a late goal from S. Underhill. Newport was fortunate in that for some reason it had home advantage for all four matches.

The clubs met again in Newport in the Birmingham Senior Cup in 1879–80, Newport again winning, with an Engineers protest unanimously dismissed. Newport's spikiness with the Engineers did not end, as secretary/captain Ward refused to hand over the Shropshire Senior trophy to the Engineers the next season, until the Shropshire FA paid him the £10 which he had contributed to make up the shortfall between the Shropshire FA's contribution to its manufacture and the actual cost. Newport's run that season in the Birmingham competition - its best in a competition it fitfully entered until its final season - ended with a 7–0 defeat at home to Aston Villa in the third round.

In 1890, the club was one of the founder members of the Shropshire League, and it finished 3rd in the first season; it was the club's best effort in the competition, but in 1895 it won the Shropshire Senior Cup for the second and final time, beating Oswestry United 3–0 at Wellington before a "huge" crowd.

The club had hitherto remained a local affair; despite its prominence in the 1870s and 1880s, it did not enter the FA Cup. It finally made an entry for the only time in 1897–98, losing 9–0 in the first qualifying round at Stourbridge.

Newport declined rapidly in 1898–99, scoring a mere 3 goals and 2 points in 12 Shropshire League matches. The club had won a match, but victims Wrockwardine Wood withdrew from the competition, with its results therefore being expunged. The final season for the club, 1899–1900, was disastrous. It lost in the Birmingham Senior Cup by a demoralizing 19 goals to nil to Ironbridge, the club stymied by having to play a Shropshire League match on the same day, and having to send a "scratch" side which could only muster ten players. To make matters worse, the League match was abandoned, scoreless, after 70 minutes because of darkness caused by the late arrival of visitors Wem.

The club finished 6th out of 8 in the Shropshire League, with 4 wins, 3 draws, and 7 defeats, but the costs of so doing had proved crippling. In August 1900, the club officials decided to suspend the club for a season having lost £26 over the previous season, with league income only amounting to £8. It was however the death-knell as the club never emerged from the suspension.

== Colours ==
The club's colours were originally given as scarlet and black "stripes" (which at the time referred to hoops), In 1881 the club added blue to its colours declaration, probably referring to shorts, which were available in blue serge at the time.

== Ground ==
The club originally played on the Newport Grammar School ground at Chetwynd End, ¾ of a mile from Newport railway station. By 1879 the club was playing at Audley Road, and by 1881 at Victoria Park, using the Royal Victoria Hotel for facilities.

== Notable player ==
The club's captain, Arthur Ward, "useful either as forward or half-back", was also a prominent player for Shropshire Wanderers. He also scored for Shrewsbury in its Birmingham Senior Cup win in 1878. He was also involved in the formation of the first Shrewsbury Town F.C. in 1881.
