= Queens Park, Australia =

Queens Park, Australia may refer to:

- Queens Park, the urban park
  - Queens Park, the Sydney suburb located adjacent to the urban park
- Queens Park, Victoria (disambiguation)
  - Queens Park, Lorne
  - Queens Park, Moonee Ponds
  - Queens Park, Newtown
- Queens Park, Western Australia
