= Queen's Park =

There are a number of places in the world called Queen's Park or Queens Park.

== Australia ==
=== New South Wales ===
- Queens Park, New South Wales, a Sydney suburb
- Queens Park, Sydney, the 26-hectare (64-acre) urban park, part of Centennial Parklands, located adjacent to the suburb

=== Queensland ===
- Queen's Park, Ipswich, a park in Ipswich
- Queens Park, Mackay, park in Mackay City
- Queen's Park, Maryborough in Queensland
- Queens Park, Toowoomba
- Queens Gardens, Brisbane, a park in Queensland, often called Queens Park
- Queens Gardens, Townsville
- Gallop Botanic Reserve, a park in Cooktown, also known as Queens Park

=== Victoria ===
- Queens Park, Victoria (disambiguation)
  - Queens Park, Newtown, Victoria Queen's Park Golf Course
  - Queens Park, Lorne, Victoria
  - Queens Park, Moonee Ponds in Victoria

=== Western Australia ===
- Queens Park, Western Australia, suburb
- Queens Park railway station, Perth, train station

== Barbados ==
- Queen's Park, Bridgetown (Barbados), (1780–1905) residence of the Commanding General of Imperial troops.

== Canada ==
- Queen's Park (Toronto)
  - a metonym for the Ontario Legislative Building, which is located in the park
  - a metonym for the Government of Ontario
  - the nearby Queen's Park station of the Toronto subway
- Calgary Queens Park, formal provincial electoral district in Alberta
- Queen's Park, New Westminster, park and adjoining neighbourhood in British Columbia
  - Queen's Park Arena, a 3,500 seat indoor arena located within the park.

== Grenada ==
- Queen's Park, Grenada, a cricket stadium
- Queen's Park (Old), an old cricket stadium

== New Zealand ==
- Queen's Park, Invercargill, a large park in the center of Invercargill
- Queens Park A.F.C. is a Football (soccer) club based in Invercargill, New Zealand

== Trinidad and Tobago ==
- Queen's Park Oval, in 2006 it is currently the largest sporting Cricket grounds in the West Indies
- Queen's Park Savannah, a large open park in capital city Port of Spain, also purported to be the largest roundabout in the world

== United Kingdom ==
- Queens Park, Aylesbury, an area within Buckinghamshire
- Queens Park, Bedford, electoral ward
- Queens Park, Birmingham, a public park
- Queen's Park, Bolton, an old park in Bolton
- Queen's Park, Bournemouth, an area of Bournemouth including a public park and a golf course
  - Queen's Park (Bournemouth ward), an electoral division
- Queen's Park, Brighton, a pleasure park, and the area round it
  - Queen's Park (Brighton ward), an electoral division
- Queens Park, Burnley, a public park in Burnley
- Queens Park Centre, in Aylesbury, Buckinghamshire
- Queens Park, Chester, a suburb
- Queen's Park, Chesterfield, a public park and county cricket ground
- Queen's Park, Crewe, a public park in Cheshire
- Queen's Park, Edinburgh, a royal park in central Edinburgh, Scotland
- Queen's Park, Glasgow, a park and district
  - Queens Park railway station (Scotland)
  - Queen's Park F.C., a professional football (soccer) club originally from Queen's Park, Glasgow
  - Queen's Park F.C. (women), a professional women's football club
- Queen's Park, Heywood, a public park in Greater Manchester
- Queen's Park, London, an area of London
  - Queens Park (Brent ward)
  - Queen's Park (Westminster ward)
  - Queen's Park station (England), a railway and tube station
  - Queens Park Rangers F.C., an English football (soccer) club originally from Queen's Park, London
- Queen's Park, Northampton, a district of Northampton
- Queens Park, Swindon, a public park
- Queens Park, Wrexham, an area and street in Wrexham, North Wales

== United States ==
- Queen's Park, a defunct amusement park in Long Beach, California

== See also ==
- Queens Gardens (disambiguation)
- Queen's Square (disambiguation)
