= 1878–79 Birmingham Senior Cup =

County cup

Tournament details
- Country: England
- Venue: Wellington Road, Perry Barr

Final positions
- Champions: Wednesbury Old Athletic
- Runners-up: Stafford Road

The 1878–79 Birmingham Senior Cup was the third season of the oldest county cup competition still active and the third oldest in the world overall. In the final Wednesbury Old Athletic (W.O.A.C.) beat Stafford Road 3–2 after extra time, repeating the result of the inaugural tournament. The result this time was controversial. The match ended 2–2 after 90 minutes, and the captains agreed to play 20 minutes' extra time to try to resolve the match, despite the Roadsters effectively being down to ten men through injury. Straight after the kick-off, both sides claimed a throw-in, and while the umpires were referring the decision to the referee, the W.O.A.C. took the throw, and Holmes put the ball through the Roadsters' goal, goalkeeper Edward "Tom" Ray making no attempt to save it. The referee decided that the throw-in was properly taken and therefore awarded the goal. Stafford Road put in a protest which was dismissed.

In September 1878 the Birmingham & District Football Association held a committee meeting at Nock's hotel. The draw for the first round took place.

== First Round ==
The two favourites for the Cup, Shrewsbury Engineers and Wednesbury Strollers, played each other in the first round. Strollers won 3-0 in front of a "hooting and ill-mannered crowd".

Aston Unity beat Aston Villa in the first round of the competition, in front of a crowd of 1,700 at the Trinity Ground.

Aston Harold were drawn against Hill Top Athletic. The match was played at the latter's ground near Swan Village. The Harold club outplayed Hill Top with neat passing compared to their opponents charging game. Harold won 2–0.

- The Harold 2–0 Hill Top Athletic
- Royal v St George's
- Wednesbury Old Athletic v Rotton Park
- Robin Hood (Walsall) v St Matthew's Institute
- Rushell Rovers v St Luke's
- Stafford Road v Florence
- Harborne Unity v St Thomas's
- Small Heath Alliance v Calthorpe
- Harborne v Saltley College
- Wednesbury Strollers v Shrewsbury Engineers
- Walsall Swifts v West Bromwich
- Aston Unity v Aston Villa
- Elwell's v Cannock

== Quarter-finals ==
Birmingham St George's first significant run in the competition came in 1878–79, losing to Walsall Swifts in the quarter-finals of the competition, in front of 750 spectators at Fentham Road.
