= Wellington St George's F.C. =

Football club in Shropshire, England

Wellington St George's
- Full name: Wellington St George's Football Club
- Nicknames: the Saints, the Dragons
- Founded: 1884
- Dissolved: 1936
- Ground: Vicarage Field, St George's near Oakengates
Home colours

Wellington St George's F.C. was an English association football club from near Telford in Shropshire.

== History ==
The club was founded in 1884 as an offshoot of the St George's cricket club, in turn based at a church near Oakengates. In the club's first season it entered the Birmingham Senior Cup and beat Sandwell F.C. in front of a very good crowd of 750, and only lost 2–1 at Wednesbury Town in the second round. In 1886-87 the club hosted Stoke in a first round replay and attracted a crowd of 3,000, but lost 4–0.

The same year, the club entered the FA Cup for the first time, losing 1–0 to Derby Junction in front of another excellent crowd of 2,000. It was the club's only appearance in the main rounds of the competition; in 1922–23, the club got as far as the fifth preliminary round, before losing 5–0 to Walsall.

The club had more success in local competitions. In 1885–86, it won the Shropshire Senior Cup, beating rivals Wellington Town 3–0 in the final at Shrewsbury. The club also won the Welsh Amateur Cup in 1900 and got as far as the semi-finals in the Welsh Cup itself in 1908–09.

The club joined the Birmingham League for its first season in 1889, but did not finish the season, and it joined the Shropshire League instead, twice finishing as champions. In 1899 the club again joined the Birmingham League but again did not complete the season, because of an accumulated debt of £50. At the time the club was bottom of the league, having only won once and drawn three times in 19 games, six points adrift of the next team (Berwick Rangers of Worcester).

The club returned to more junior football, and changed its name to St George's Victoria in the 1900s, winning the Shropshire Senior Cup twice more, although by this time it was a much less prestigious competition than in the pre-Football League days.

It was not until 1924 that it re-joined the Birmingham League, and, after finishing bottom three times from 1928 to 1931, the club resigned to join the Staffordshire League. The club's final season appears to have been in the Walsall & District League in 1935–36, only playing 14 matches out of 24 (only winning 3) in a competition that saw a number of clubs fail to complete their fixtures.

== Honours ==
- FA Cup: best performance
  - First round proper: 1886–87
- Welsh Cup: best performance
  - Semi-final: 1908–09
- Shropshire League
  - Winners: 1893–94, 1894–95
- Shropshire Senior Cup
  - Winners: 1885–86, 1905–06, 1906–07
- Shropshire Charity Cup
  - Winners: 1888–89
- Welsh Amateur Cup
  - Winners: 1899–1900

== Colours ==
The club originally played in all light blue, changing to claret with white shoulders and sleeves in around 1890. Apart from a brief period in claret and blue, and a dalliance with amber and black in 1898–99, the club remained in claret and white for the rest of its existence.
