= Shropshire Senior Cup =

- Organiser(s): Shropshire FA
- Founded: 1877; 149 years ago
- Region: Shropshire
- Current champions: Whitchurch Alport (1st title)
- Most championships: Shrewsbury Town (66 titles)
- Website: Shropshire Senior Cup

The Shropshire Senior Cup was a county cup football competition that is open for professional and non-professional senior football teams in the English county of Shropshire.

The competition is one of the oldest cup competitions in the world, and notably, the original winning trophy is still presented to the winners, some 130 years after the Cup's inception. It is organised by the Shropshire Football Association and is annual.

The competition was first staged in the 1877–78 season, the inaugural winners being Shrewsbury, who beat Wellington Parish Church Institute 1–0.

Over the years, the competition has been dominated by the county's two leading football teams, Shrewsbury Town and Telford United, and more recently A.F.C. Telford United following the demise of the old Telford United in 2004.

Other county teams to have featured in the cup in recent years have included Market Drayton Town, Shifnal Town, Bridgnorth Town, Ludlow Town and The New Saints.

== Finals ==
This section lists every final of the competition played since 1877, the winners, the runners-up, and the result.

=== Key ===
Match went to a replay
Match went to extra time
Match decided by a penalty shootout after extra time
Shared trophy

Season	Winners	Result	Runner-up	Notes
1877–78	Shrewsbury	1–0	Parish Church Institute	
1878–79	Newport	2–1	Shrewsbury Engineers	Third replay. First match ended 1–1. Replay 1–1. Second replay 0–0.
1879–80	Shrewsbury Engineers	1–0	Oswestry	
1880–81	Wellington Town	2–1	Shifnal Town	
1881–82	Oswestry	2–1	Shrewsbury Castle Blues	
1882–83	Wellington Town	1–0	Shrewsbury Castle Blues	Replay. First match ended 3–3.
1883–84	Shrewsbury Castle Blues	2–1	Wellington Town	Second replay. First match ended 0–0. Replay ended 1–1.
1884–85	Oswestry	2–0	St George's Victoria	
1885–86	St George's Victoria	2–0	Wellington Town	Replay. First match ended 0–0.
1886–87	Shrewsbury Town	3–2	Wellington Town	Replay. First match ended 0–0.
1887–88	Shrewsbury Town	3–0	Ironbridge	
1888–89	Shrewsbury Town	5–4	Wellington Town	
1889–90	Ironbridge	3–1	Oswestry	
1890–91	Shrewsbury Town	3–1	Oswestry	
1891–92	Ironbridge	6–1	Whitchurch	
1892–93	Shrewsbury Town	1–0	Ironbridge	
1893–94	Shrewsbury Town	2–1	Oswestry United	
1894–95	Newport	3–0	Oswestry United	
1895–96	Shrewsbury Town	4–1	Ironbridge	
1896–97	Shrewsbury Town	2–0	Wellington Town	
1897–98	Shrewsbury Town	2–0	Wellington Town	
1898–99	Oswestry United	1–0	St George's Victoria	
1899–00	Wellington Town	6–1	Oswestry United	
1900–01	Wellington Town	3–1	Oswestry United	
1901–02	Ironbridge	4–1	Oswestry United	
1902–03	Shrewsbury Town	7–1	Oswestry United	
1903–04	Shrewsbury Town	2–0	Wellington Town	
1904–05	Wellington Town	1–0	Oswestry United	Replay. First match ended 1–1.
1905–06	St George's Victoria	2–1	Whitchurch	
1906–07	St George's Victoria	3–0	Oswestry United	
1907–08	Ironbridge United	2–1	Wellington Town	Replay. First match ended 1–1.
1908–09	Oswestry United	2–0	St George's Victoria	
1909–10	Shrewsbury Town	2–0	St George's Victoria	
1910–11	Whitchurch	1–0	Oswestry	Replay. First match ended 1–1.
1911–12	Wellington Town	3–2	Oswestry United	Replay. First match ended 0–0.
1912–13	Shrewsbury Town		Hadley Castle Works	
1913–14	Wellington Town	2–1	Shrewsbury Town	
1914–15	Shrewsbury Town	2–0	Wellington Town	
1915–19	Competition not held due to World War I.			
1919–20	Wellington Town			
1920–21	Wellington Town			
1921–22	Wellington Town			
1922–23	Shrewsbury Town			
1923–24	Whitchurch			
1924–25	Shrewsbury Town			
1925–26	Wellington Town			
1926–27	Oakengates Town			
1927–29	Wellington Town			
1929–30	Shrewsbury Town			
1930–31	Oakengates Town			
1931–32	Oakengates Town			
1932–33	Shrewsbury Town			
1933–34	Wellington Town			
1934–35	Wellington Town			
1935–36	Wellington Town			
1936–37	Shrewsbury Town			
1937–38	Shrewsbury Town			
1938–39	Wellington Town			
1939–40	Wellington Town			
1940–41	Wellington Town			
1941–42	RAF Cosford			
1942–43	Wellington Town			
1943–44	Shrewsbury Town			
1944–45	Wellington Town			
1945–46	Final not played.			
1946–47	Shrewsbury Town			
1947–48	Oswestry Town			
1948–49	Shrewsbury Town			
1949–50	Oswestry Town			
1950–51	Shrewsbury Town			
1951–52	Shrewsbury Town			
1952–53	Shrewsbury Town			
1953–54	Shrewsbury Town			
1954–55	Shrewsbury Town			
1955–56	Oswestry Town			
1956–57	Shrewsbury Town			
1957–58	Oakengates Town; Shrewsbury Town			Trophy shared.
1958–59	Shrewsbury Town			
1959–60	Wellington Town			
1960–61	Wellington Town			
1961–62	Sankey Wellington			
1962–63	Shrewsbury Town			
1963–64	Shrewsbury Town			
1964–65	Oswestry Town			
1965–66	Shrewsbury Town			
1966–67	Wellington Town			
1967–68	Shrewsbury Town; Wellington Town			Trophy shared.
1968–69	Shrewsbury Town			
1969–70	Telford United			
1970–71	Shrewsbury Town			
1971–72	Shrewsbury Town			
1972–73	Telford United			
1973–74	Shrewsbury Town			
1974–75	Shrewsbury Town			
1975–76	Telford United			
1976–77	Telford United			
1977–78	Telford United			
1978–79	Telford United			
1979–80	Shrewsbury Town			
1980–81	Shrewsbury Town			
1981–82	Shrewsbury Town			
1982–83	Shrewsbury Town			
1983–84	Shrewsbury Town			
1984–85	Oswestry Town			
1985–86	Bridgnorth Town			
1986–87	Shrewsbury Town			
1987–88	Shrewsbury Town			
1988–89	Shrewsbury Town			
1989–90	Telford United			
1990–91	Shrewsbury Town			
1991–92	Telford United			
1992–93	Telford United			
1993–94	Telford United			
1994–95	Shrewsbury Town			
1995–96	Shrewsbury Town			
1996–97	Shrewsbury Town			
1997–98	Shrewsbury Town			
1998–99	Shrewsbury Town			
1999–00	Shrewsbury Town			
2000–01	Wolverhampton Wanderers			
2001–02	Shrewsbury Town			
2002–03	Shrewsbury Town			
2003–04	Shrewsbury Town			
2004–05	Shrewsbury Town			
2005–06	Shrewsbury Town			
2006–07	Shrewsbury Town			
2007–08	Shrewsbury Town	3–0	Market Drayton Town	
2008–09	AFC Telford United	1–1	Shrewsbury Town	AFC Telford United won 4–1 on penalties.
2009–10	Shrewsbury Town	2–1	AFC Telford United	
2010–11	Shrewsbury Town	1–0	AFC Telford United	
2011–12	The New Saints	1–1	AFC Telford United	The New Saints won 4–2 on penalties.
2012–13	Final was scrapped as a date could not be found. Shrewsbury Town and AFC Telford United were in the finals.			
2013–14	AFC Telford United	3–1	Market Drayton Town	
2014–15	Shrewsbury Town	3–1	AFC Telford United	
2015–16	Shrewsbury Town	1–1	AFC Telford United	Shrewsbury Town won 3–2 on penalties.
2016–17	AFC Telford United	2–0	Shrewsbury Town	
2017–18	Shawbury United			
2018–19	Shrewsbury Town			
2019–20	Competition suspended due to COVID-19 pandemic.			
2020–21	Shifnal Town			
2021–22	No competition.			
2022–23	Whitchurch Alport			

=== Wins by teams ===
Club	Wins	First final won	Last final won	Notes
Shrewsbury Town	66	1886–87	2018–19	
Telford United †	34	1882–83	1993–94	Dissolved in 2004. Won 24 titles as Wellington Town.
Oswestry Town †	4	1947–48	1984–85	Dissolved in 2003.
Oakengates Town †	4	1926–27	1957–58	Dissolved in 2018.
Ironbridge United †	4	1889–90	1907–08	Won 3 titles as Ironbridge.
St George's Victoria †	3	1885–86	1906–07	Dissolved in 1936.
AFC Telford United	3	2008–09	2016–17	
Oswestry †	2	1881–82	1884–85	Dissolved in 1891.
Newport †	2	1878–79	1894–95	Dissolved in 1900.
Oswestry United †	2	1898–99	1908–09	Dissolved in 1915.
Whitchurch †	2	1910–11	1923–24	Dissolved in 1985.
Shrewsbury †	1	1877–78	1877–78	Dissolved in 1879.
Shrewsbury Engineers †	1	1879–80	1879–80	Dissolved in 1881.
Shrewsbury Castle Blues †	1	1883–84	1883–84	Dissolved in 1886.
RAF Cosford	1	1941–42	1941–42	Military team.
Sankey Wellington †	1	1961–62	1961–62	Dissolved in 1988.
Bridgnorth Town †	1	1985–86	1985–86	Dissolved in 2013.
Wolverhampton Wanderers	1	2000–01	2000–01	
The New Saints	1	2011–12	2011–12	Only Welsh club to win.
Shawbury United	1	2017–18	2017–18	
Shifnal Town	1	2020–21	2020–21	
Whitchurch Alport	1	2022–23	2022–23	

=== Wins by cities/towns ===
City	County	Wins	Team(s)
Shrewsbury	Shropshire	70	Shrewsbury Town (66), Shrewsbury (2), Shrewsbury Engineers (1), Shrewsbury Castle Blues (1)
Telford	Shropshire	37	Telford United (34), AFC Telford United (3)
Oswestry	Shropshire	9	Oswestry (2), Oswestry United (2), Oswestry Town (4), (Wales) The New Saints (1)
Oakengates	Shropshire	7	Oakengates Town (4), St George's Victoria (3)
Ironbridge	Shropshire	4	Ironbridge United (4)
Whitchurch	Shropshire	3	Whitchurch (2), Whitchurch Alport (1)
Newport	Shropshire	2	Newport (2)
Bridgnorth	Shropshire	1	Bridgnorth Town (1)
Cosford	Shropshire	1	RAF Cosford (1)
Shawbury	Shropshire	1	Shawbury United (1)
Shifnal	Shropshire	1	Shifnal Town (1)
Wellington	Shropshire	1	Sankey Wellington (1)
Wolverhampton	(West Midlands (county)) West Midlands	1	Wolverhampton Wanderers (1)

== See also ==
- Football in Shropshire
