= Queens Gardens =

Queens Gardens or Queen's Gardens may refer to:

- Queen's Gardens, Kingston upon Hull – gardens in the East Riding of Yorkshire, England
- Queen's Gardens (Croydon) – gardens in south London, England
- Queen's Gardens, Westminster – gardens in the City of Westminster, London, England
- Queen's Gardens, Newcastle-under-Lyme – gardens in Newcastle-under-Lyme, England
- Queens Gardens, Brisbane – gardens in Brisbane, Queensland, Australia
- Queens Gardens, Townsville – a botanical garden in Townsville, Queensland
- Queens Gardens, Dunedin – street and park in Dunedin, New Zealand
- Queens Gardens, Perth – gardens in Perth, Western Australia
- Queens Garden (restaurant) – Michelin starred restaurant in The Hague, Netherlands
