= Edward Elwell Ltd =

Edward Elwell Ltd was a company in Wednesbury in Staffordshire (now in the county of West Midlands), England, that manufactured edge tools at Wednesbury Forge. The company was founded in 1817, and the forge closed in 2005.

== History ==
Edward Elwell (1783–1869), son of an ironfounder in Walsall, leased a forge in 1817 in Wood Green, Wednesbury, powered by water from the River Tame. There had been a water-powered forge in Wednesbury since at least 1597, when William Whorwood leased a forge owned by William Comberford. It may have been the same site as the forge at Wood Green, which by 1785 was one of four forges in the town.

Edward Elwell became known as a maker of quality edge tools, such as axes, hoes, shovels and spades. The machinery was powered by water and by steam engines. By 1851 Edward Elwell's son Edward (1814–1857) had taken over management of the company, but he resumed control on his son's death; his grandson Alfred took over when he died in 1869.

The company exported to many countries, including America, where it sold large quantities of edge tools during the American Civil War. The company was interested in the welfare of its workforce, converting former workshops into housing, and developing sports facilities. St Paul's Church, Wood Green, completed in 1874, was built by the Elwell family.

After Alfred Elwell's death in 1902 the business became a private limited company. The water wheels were replaced in 1904 by water turbines. In 1967, the company became one of the amalgamated firms of a newly formed company Spearwell Tools Ltd, and this was later taken over by Spear & Jackson. Wednesbury Forge closed in 2005, and the buildings were demolished in 2007.

== Elwell's football club ==
In 1879–80, Elwell's football club reached a peak in the inaugural Wednesbury Charity Cup, at the time a prestigious tournament in which the leading clubs of the region were invited to participate. The club lost to Stafford Road in the final, which took place at the Old Uns' ground on 31 May; the Roadsters beat the Wednesbury side 3–0.

On Whit Monday May 1880, Aston Villa Football Club arranged a six-a-side football competition at their Wellington Road ground. Other club entries included Elwell's, Walsall Swifts, Wednesbury Old Athletic, Blackburn Rovers, Darwen, and Notts Forest.

The team beat St George's and Excelsior to reach the third round of the 1880–81 Birmingham Senior Cup before losing to 5-1 to Chestefield Spital. In that year's Staffordshire Cup, Aston Villa beat Elwell on the road to final.

Elwells FC, were an established side in the 1881–82 season, when West Bromwich Albion decided to pay a subscription to join the Birmingham & District Football Association thus first becoming eligible for the Birmingham Senior Cup. Albion's run to the quarter-finals of that tournament, beating Elwells among others, made their name in the Birmingham press.
