= Oswestry United F.C. =

- Full name: Oswestry United Football Club
- Founded: September 1893
- Dissolved: March 1915
- Ground: Victoria Road; Oswestry
- 1914–15: Lancashire Combination Division 2, withdrew
late 1900s colours

Oswestry United Football Club was a football club from Shropshire, playing at Victoria Road.

== History ==
The club was formed in September 1893 after the demise of Oswestry F.C. in 1891. They joined the Shropshire & District League.

The club won the Shropshire Senior Cup in 1899 and 1909, and won the Welsh Cup in 1901 and in 1907. For its first triumph, special trains took 1,000 supporters from Oswestry to the Racecourse Ground, although they formed a minority in the 7,000 crowd, most of the remainder supporting opponents Druids; nevertheless the Salopians scored the only goal of the game.

=== Demise ===
In September 1914 it was reported that the club had lost five players due to enlistments in World War I, and it was likely that the club would no longer be able to continue in the Lancashire Combination League. By October 1914 the club are shown to have only played two fixtures in the league. The club were due to play a Shropshire Cup fixture with Shrewsbury Town in March 1915, but could not raise a team and were later ejected from the competition.

When football started again after World War I the club did not re-emerge.

The new Oswestry Town club replaced United as the main club in Oswestry in 1920.

== Colours ==
The club is known to have worn the following colours:

- 1900–01: red and blue halves
- 1902–04: chocolate and blue
- 1906–07: green
- 1909–13: navy and sky blue
- by 1915: blue and white striped shirts

== League history ==
Season	League	P	W	D	L	GF	GA	Pts	Pos
1893-94	Shropshire League	18	4	4	10	35	63	12	10
1894-95	Shropshire League	18	10	5	3	53	25	25	2
1895-96	Shropshire League	18	3	0	15	30	71	6	10
1896-97	Welsh Senior League	14	8	3	3	33	16	17	3
1897-98	Shropshire League	18	8	1	9	36	40	17	6
1898-99	The Combination	28	9	2	17	49	73	20	12
1899-1900	The Combination	16	5	2	9	30	38	10	8
1900-01	The Combination	22	10	8	4	57	28	28	4
1901-02	The Combination	26	12	6	8	55	33	30	3
1902-03	The Combination	26	14	2	10	57	42	30	5
1903-04	The Combination	24	11	2	11	42	55	24	7
1904-05	The Combination	26	10	2	14	43	62	22	10
1905-06	The Combination	28	13	1	14	72	56	27	9
1906-07	The Combination	26	9	6	11	49	41	24	9
1907-08	The Combination	26	16	4	6	62	38	36	3
1908-09	The Combination	30	13	4	13	74	55	30	9
1909-10	The Combination	30	9	7	14	44	62	25	11
1910-11	The Combination	20	11	3	6	44	27	25	3
1910-11	Wrexham & District League	Withdrew							
1911-12	Lancashire Combination Division 2	30	13	5	12	75	64	31	8
1912-13	Lancashire Combination Division 2	34	17	3	14	79	80	37	10
1913-14	Lancashire Combination Division 2	34	14	4	16	47	60	32	12
1914-15	Lancashire Combination Division 2	Withdrew							

== Honours ==
=== Cup ===
- Welsh Cup
  - 1900–01, 1906–07
- Shropshire Senior Cup
  - 1898–99, 1908–09
