= Walsall Observer =

Defunct British weekly newspaper

The Walsall Observer was a weekly newspaper, published in Walsall in the West Midlands of England from 1868 to 2009.

== History ==
Founded October 24, 1868 by brothers John and William Griffin as The Walsall Observer, and General District Advertiser, it became a regional weekly. By 1962, as the Walsall Observer and South Staffordshire Chronicle, it was the only surviving paper in Walsall, having absorbed such competitors as the Walsall Advertiser. By 1990 it had become a free newspaper. By 2006, it had gone from nine journalists on staff twenty-five years earlier (i.e., circa 1981) to one senior, one trainee, and an editor shared with two other weekly papers; and, the National Union of Journalists charged, was reduced to a situation where "the paper largely regurgitates submitted material and press releases with little or no challenge.". In 2009, owners Trinity Mirror closed it down along with several other Midlands weeklies.

Former reporters for the Observer include David Ennals, Baron Ennals; Steve Green; Jane Kelly; Ruth Elliott-Smith and Richard Tomkins.
