= History of Wolverhampton Wanderers F.C. =

History of an English football club

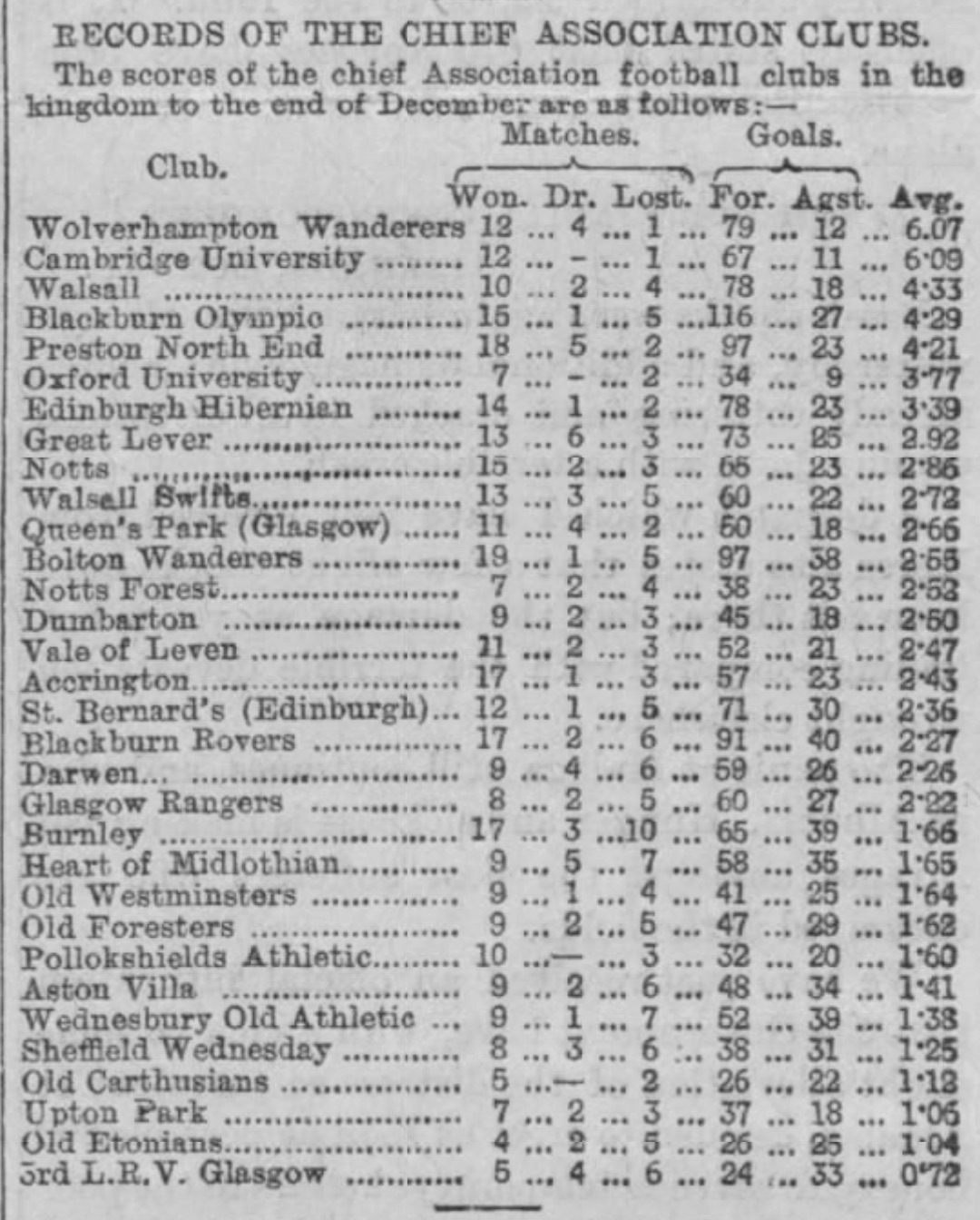
An early form table, with clubs sorted by goal average. Manchester Courier, 5 January 1885

Wolverhampton Wanderers Football Club, commonly referred to as Wolves, is an English professional association football club that represents the city of Wolverhampton in the West Midlands region. This article covers the history of the club from its formation in 1877 as St. Luke's F.C. to the present day.

== Formation ==
Graph charting Wolves' yearly performance in the English Football League system.

The team were founded as St. Luke's F.C. in 1877 by John Baynton and John Brodie, after a group of pupils at St Luke's Church, Blakenhall, had been presented with a football by their headmaster Harry Barcroft. Two years later, they merged with local cricket and football club The Wanderers to form Wolverhampton Wanderers. The club were initially given the use of two fields – James Harper's Field and Red House Park – both off Lower Villiers Street in Blakenhall.

In 1881, they moved to a site on the Dudley Road opposite the Fighting Cocks Inn. The club then became one of the twelve founders of the English Football League in 1888 and finished the inaugural season in a creditable third place, as well as reaching their first-ever FA Cup Final, losing 3–0 to the first "Double" winners, Preston North End. In the first year of the Football League, Wolves benefited from the first own goal in the league's history, scored by Gershom Cox of Aston Villa.

== Early cup triumphs & inter-bellum adventures ==
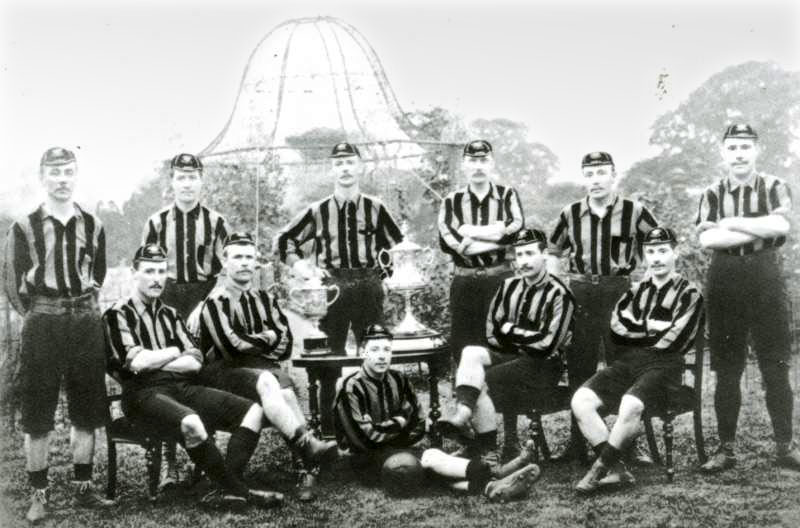
The Wolves team that won the FA Cup in 1893

Wolves remained as members of what became the First Division from 1888 until relegation in 1906, winning the FA Cup for the first time in 1893 when they beat Everton 1–0 at Fallowfield Stadium in Manchester. Two years after relegation the team enjoyed another FA Cup win, as a Second Division club, surprisingly beating Newcastle United 3–1 in the 1908 final. After struggling for many years to regain their place in the top division, Wolves suffered relegation again in 1923, dropping into the Third Division (North). Wolves' first promotion was won just a year later, narrowly claiming the Third Division North title at the first attempt ahead of Rochdale.

Following eight more years back in the Second Division, Wolves finally achieved a return to top division football in 1932, claiming the Second Division title and another promotion. In the years leading up to the Second World War, the team became established as one of the leading club sides in England. In 1938, Wolves needed only to win the last game of the season to be champions for the first time, but were beaten 1–0 at Sunderland and Arsenal claimed the title. They again finished as runners-up in 1939, this time behind Everton, and endured more frustration with defeat in the last pre-War FA Cup Final, losing 4–1 to underdogs Portsmouth.

== The Stan Cullis era & the birth of European football ==
"Many say Manchester United would have won the championship in 1958 if not for the Munich air crash in February 1958. They were a great side, but even if the crash had never happened, they could not have caught us. Even after the disaster we didn't drop enough points for that to happen."

— Malcolm Finlayson,
Wolves goalkeeper and Title winner, 1958 & 1959

When league football resumed in 1946, Wolves suffered yet another heartbreaking failure in the First Division. Just as in 1938, victory in their last match of the season against title rivals Liverpool would have won the title but a 2–1 defeat gave the 1947 championship to the Merseyside club instead.

That game had been the last in a Wolves shirt for Stan Cullis, and a year later he became manager of the club. In Cullis's first season in charge, he led Wolves to a first major honour in 41 years as they beat Leicester City 3–1 in the FA Cup Final, and a year later, only goal average prevented Wolves winning the First Division title. The 1950s were by far the most successful period in the history of Wolverhampton Wanderers. Captained by Billy Wright, Wolves finally claimed the league championship for the first time in 1954, overhauling fierce rivals West Bromwich Albion late in the season. Two further titles were later won in successive years, as Wolves cemented their position as the premier team in English football and became globally renowned for their on-field success as well as high-profile floodlit friendlies against top European club sides and the pioneering development of the Cullis "kick and rush" style of football.

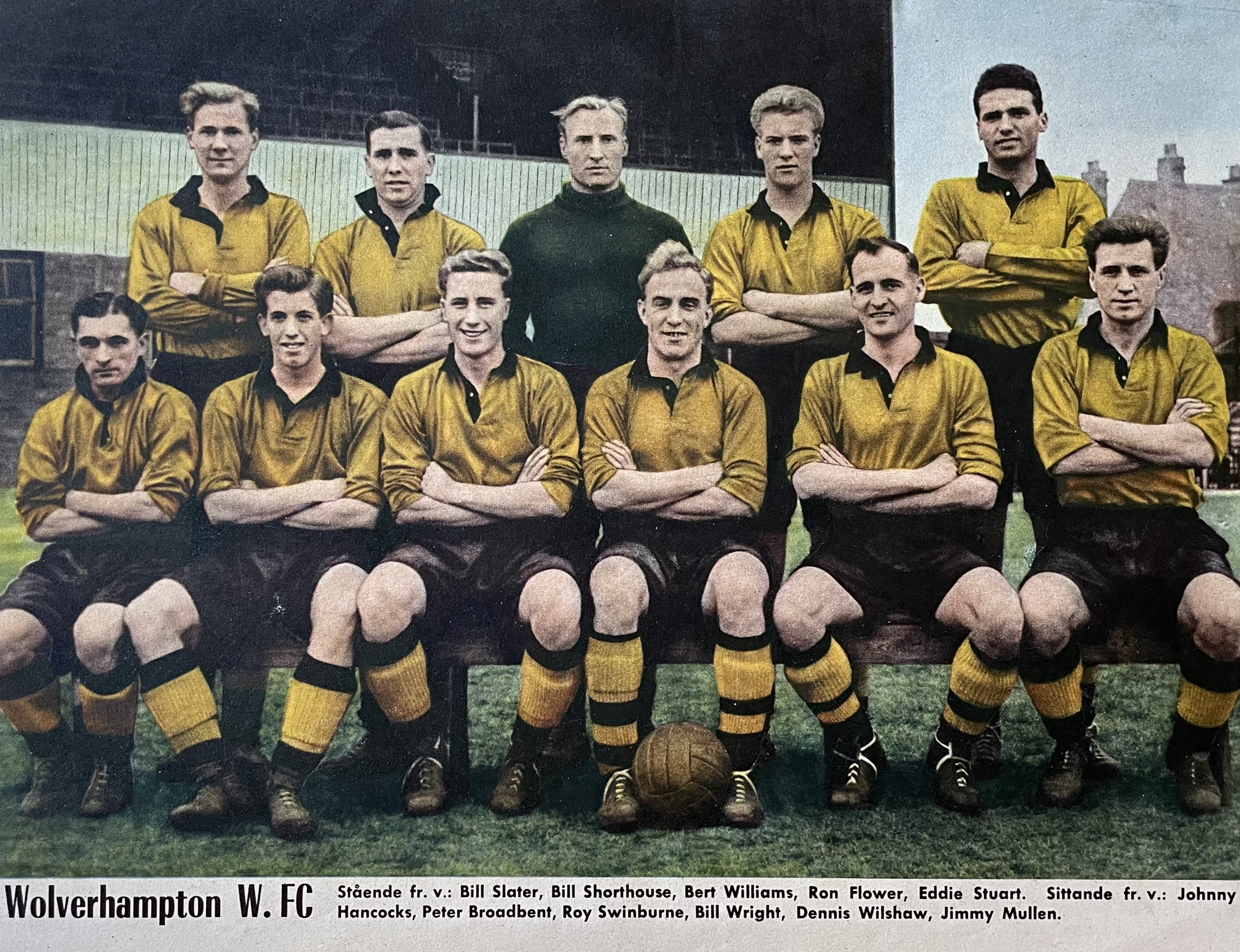
Wolverhampton Wanderers F.C. side at 1955 with following players, from left standing: Bill Slater, Bill Shorthouse, Bert Williams, Ron Flowers, Eddie Stuart; front row: Johnny Hancocks, Peter Broadbent, Roy Swinburne, Billy Wright (captain), Dennis Wilshaw and Jimmy Mullen.

Building upon Buckley's principles of hard work in training, exceptional physical fitness coupled with early pioneering use of sports science, strict discipline and a doctrine of all-out attack on the field, Cullis's kick and rush method incorporated long passes and speed of execution, hitting the opposition penalty box faster and more frequently to apply the percentage principle to goalscoring. The method was characterised by a defensive resilience, built as it was around the England internationals Bert Williams in goal and Billy Wright at half-back, but also incorporated quick movement of the ball and swift attacking support for the player in possession, particularly around the wing play of Johnny Hancocks and Jimmy Mullen.

Their innovation on the pitch was matched elsewhere, as Molineux was one of the first grounds to provide their team with floodlights in the summer of 1953, as the club also blossomed financially thanks to high-profile friendlies with top sides such as Real Madrid who all came and suffered defeat at the hands of Cullis' men. The following series of famous "floodlit friendlies", beginning with a game against a South African XI, had a huge effect in raising the profile of the club, enthusing many such as the young Wolves fan George Best and others who were lucky enough to be able to watch the games on the BBC in some of football's first televised games. Other major club games at the time included victories over Borussia Dortmund, Valencia CF, and a 3–0 victory over Real Madrid achieved 'by indefatigable tackling, by the characteristic longflung pass and by a directness of approach that showed the Spanish the virtues of traditional English football'.

These high-profile games continued against top national sides such as Racing Club of Argentina and Spartak Moscow of the USSR, before meeting Honvéd of Hungary in a landmark game for English football, televised live on the BBC. Wolves faced a Honvéd team that included Ferenc Puskás and many other members of the "Magical Magyars", 1954 World Cup finalists and one of the historically great sides that had recently beaten England twice. In front of the watching nation, Wolves came from two goals down at half time to beat the Hungarian side 3–2, which coupled with their previous European exploits, lead the national media to proclaim Wolves "Champions of the World". This was the final spur for Gabriel Hanot, the editor of L'Équipe, who had long campaigned for a Europe wide club tournament to be played under floodlights.

Before we declare that Wolverhampton Wanderers are invincible, let them go to Moscow and Budapest. And there are other internationally renowned clubs: A.C. Milan and Real Madrid to name but two. A club world championship, or at least a European one – larger, more meaningful and more prestigious than the Mitropa Cup and more original than a competition for national teams – should be launched. — Gabriel Hanot, editor of L'Équipe

The UEFA Congress of March 1955 saw the proposal raised, with approval given in April of that year, and the kick-off of the first European Cup the following season. The 1959 title win saw Wolves play in the European Cup for the first time, being only the second English club after Manchester United to enter. Later, Spartak Moscow, Dynamo Moscow and Real Madrid all came to Molineux and were beaten, as Wolves saw mixed successes in the European Cup against teams such as Red Star Belgrade, Schalke 04 and Barcelona, during Real Madrid's period of domination. Wolves were also League Champions in 1958 and 1959, and in 1960 became the first team to pass the 100-goal mark for three seasons in succession. Coming agonisingly close to a hat-trick of titles and the first double of the twentieth century, Wolves finished just one point behind Burnley and had to make do with a fourth FA Cup win, beating Blackburn Rovers 3–0 in the final.

== Cullis sacked, Wolves American champions ==
The early 1960s saw Wolves begin to decline, and Cullis was sacked in September 1964 at the start of a dreadful season during which the club was never out of the relegation zone. Relegation meant the club's first spell outside the top division in more than thirty years; however, the exile would last just two seasons, as an eight-game winning run in the spring of 1967 led the way to promotion back to the First Division as runners-up to the 1966–67 Second Division Champions Coventry City.

During the summer of 1967, Wolves played a season in North America as part of a fledgling league called the United Soccer Association. This league imported twelve entire clubs from Europe and South America to play in American and Canadian cities, with each club bearing a local name. Wolverhampton Wanderers, playing as the "Los Angeles Wolves", won the Western Division and then went on to earn the League Title by defeating the Eastern Division champions Washington Whips (Aberdeen of Scotland) in the championship match. (This FIFA-sanctioned league merged the following season with the non-sanctioned National Professional Soccer League, which had also begun in 1967, to form the North American Soccer League).

== The Seventies resurgence ==
The club's return to the English top flight heralded another period of relative success, with a squad that included stars Derek Dougan, Kenny Hibbitt and Frank Munro finishing the 1970–71 season in fourth place, qualifying them for the newly created UEFA Cup. En route to the 1972 UEFA Cup Final, they beat Académica 7–1 on aggregate, ADO Den Haag 7–1 on aggregate, FC Carl Zeiss Jena 4–0 on aggregate, Juventus 3–2 on aggregate in the quarter-final and Ferencváros 4–3 in the semi-final. Wolves lost the home leg of the two-legged final against Tottenham Hotspur 2–1 (goal from Jim McCalliog) and drew at White Hart Lane 1–1 with a goal from David Wagstaffe.

Two years later in 1974 they went on to beat Manchester City in the 1974 League Cup Final, taking the trophy for the first time. Despite relegation again in 1976, Wolves were to bounce back at the first attempt as Second Division champions. By 1979–80, things were again looking promising for Wolves: the club finished sixth in the First Division and reached the 1980 Football League Cup Final, where record-signing Andy Gray scored the decisive goal which defeated the reigning European Champions and League Cup holders Nottingham Forest, thus bringing League Cup glory to Wolves for a second time.

== Decline and rescue ==
Wolves went through a bad spell in the 1980s. The Molineux Street stand, built in 1932, was demolished, along with 71 terraced houses on Molineux Street, in 1979, and a new stand built at a cost of £1½ million ready for the 1979–80 season. However, the cost of this redevelopment, combined with the economic recession of the early-1980s (which hit match attendances hard), triggered serious financial difficulties for the club.

The 1980s had not begun badly for Wolves. The club won the Football League Cup and finished sixth in the First Division in the 1979–80 season. They also reached the FA Cup semi-finals in 1981, as they had also achieved in 1979. When John Barnwell, who had suffered serious injuries in a car crash in 1979, felt obliged to resign as manager in 1982, Wolves made an attempt to recruit Alex Ferguson, manager of the successful Scottish side Aberdeen, as Barnwell's successor. However, the club was in poor financial health and Ferguson had no desire to leave the Scottish club. He declined the offer and Graham Hawkins was appointed instead. Meanwhile, Ferguson enjoyed another four years of success with Aberdeen before he moved to England to take over at Manchester United where he remained until 2013.

Wolves were relegated to the Second Division at the end of the 1981–82 season, and then almost went out of business just before the start of the 1982–83 season with £2½ million debts. After a shareholders’ rebellion against Harry Marshall led by Wolverhampton insurance-broker Roger Jeffrey Hipkiss, the club was saved from liquidation when Hipkiss's close friend and the club's former player Derek Dougan helped formalise a takeover deal as a front man for the Saudi Bhatti brothers. Promotion back to the First Division was achieved (as runners-up) at the first attempt. However, the Bhattis did not invest in the club, and three consecutive relegations in 1984, 1985 and 1986 saw a financially moribund Wolves slide into the Fourth Division for the first time in the club's history. By 1986 the club's existence was in doubt and two sides of the by now decaying Molineux stadium were condemned and closed to spectators; however, the Bhattis finally relinquished ownership of the club at this point and the rehabilitation of the club started.

With just a few months of the 1983–84 season gone, Wolves had failed to win any of their 14 opening First Division games, but even then few could have imagined just how steep the decline would be. There were some bright spots even in that campaign, the first coming on 26 November 1983 when Wolves finally won a league game at the 15th attempt, breaking their win-less run in style with a 3–1 away win over local rivals West Bromwich Albion. Their second win came on 27 December when they beat Everton 3–0 to record their first home league win of the season. Perhaps the best result of the season came on 14 January 1984 when they won 1–0 at Liverpool – the dominant side of that era, who were in the process of winning their third successive league title (and also the European Cup and Football League Cup) that season. On 18 February they held title chasing Manchester United to a 1–1 draw – a result which contributed towards their opponent's ultimate failure to win the title. A 1–0 home win over Nottingham Forest on 3 March followed, but Wolves were still a long way off survival and would win just one more league game after this, going down in bottom place. They had also lost star striker Andy Gray to Everton in November.

The 1984–85 season didn't begin particularly badly, with the first few games producing mixed results, but a 5–1 defeat at Barnsley on 29 September 1984 was the first real sign that Wolves could face a second successive season of struggle. By early November, they had actually managed to put together a three-match winning run which saw them occupy 13th place and suggest that they were more than capable of survival, if not promotion. But a seven-match losing run followed, dragging them into the relegation zone by New Year's Day 1985. Wolves failed to win another league game until 8 April 1985, but they were still in the relegation zone. On 6 May 1985, they were relegated despite a 2–1 home win over Huddersfield Town. As well as declining in their league standing, their attendances were also in a downward spiral by this stage. Nearly 15,000 had watched their opening game against Sheffield United, but during the second half of the season they were struggling to attract half that figure. A mere 4,422 fans watched their final home game of the season – the game where relegation was confirmed.

Wolves began their first season in the national Third Division on 17 August 1985, losing 2–1 to Brentford at Griffin Park. A week later, they took on one of the division's weakest sides – Newport County – at the Molineux, but lost 2–1. The next game ended in a 4–2 defeat at promotion favourites Derby County, and Wolves finally managed to claim points at the first attempt with a 3–2 home win over York City. Four defeats followed before another victory. By the time Wolves were crushed 6–0 by Rotherham United in the FA Cup first round on 16 November 1985, a third of the league season had already gone and Wolves had still yet to put together a run of good results, so a third successive relegation – a humiliation which only Bristol City four seasons earlier had so far suffered – was now looking a real possibility. Wolves never managed to put together a good run in the league and their relegation to the Fourth Division – for the first time in their history – was confirmed on 26 April 1986 despite a 3–1 home win over Cardiff City, who had gone down with them the previous season and would suffer a second successive relegation.

On 2 July 1986 the Bhatti brothers era came to an end when the official receiver was called in at Wolverhampton Wanderers Football Club. However, the club was saved from extinction when Wolverhampton Council purchased Molineux for £1.12 million, along with the surrounding land, while Gallagher Estates Limited, in conjunction with the Asda Superstore chain, agreed to pay off the club's outstanding debts, subject to building and planning permission for an Asda superstore on land adjacent to the stadium being granted by the council.

Wolves played their first game in the Fourth Division on 23 August 1986, at home to Cambridge United. They lost 2–1, but were victorious in their next game on 30 August when they travelled to Aldershot and won 2–1. Mixed results followed during the autumn as Wolves were some way off the automatic promotion and new promotion/relegation playoff places – though at least they were comfortably clear of the bottom place in the league, which for the first time would mean automatic relegation to the Football Conference.

Following a succession of different managers during the crises of the previous three years, a new era of managerial stability began on 7 October 1986 when Wolves appointed Graham Turner as their new manager. He would remain at the helm for more than seven years. His arrival was orchestrated by a new Board led by Jack Harris (Former Walsall Chairman)and Dick Homden who skillfully directed the club back to winning ways while maintaining a tight control of their limited funds. The Jack Harris Stand is an acknowledgement of this period and it is questionable that Wolves would have survived to the Jack Hayward era had Harris and Homden not brought their considerable experience into the boardroom.

20 November 1986 saw the arrival of 21-year-old striker Steve Bull from West Bromwich Albion for £64,000. Over the next 13 years, Bull would score more than 300 goals for Wolves and despite never playing in the top division, he was capped 13 times for England and scored four goals. His first Wolves goal came on 13 December 1986 in a 1–0 win at Hartlepool United.

By the turn of 1987, Wolves were still mid table in the Fourth Division and promotion was looking doubtful. However, the second half of the season saw Wolves take off as Bull and his strike partner Andy Mutch became regular goalscorers. Wolves were now playing some of their best football in years, their biggest successes being a 5–2 win at Burnley (another former giant who were now struggling in the Fourth Division and would only narrowly cling onto their Football League status at the end of the 1986–87 season), a 4–0 home win over Swansea City (who had also experienced First Division football earlier in the decade) and a thrilling 4–3 away win over Halifax Town. By 20 April 1987, Wolves had won seven matches in a row and looked good bets for promotion. Their season ended with a 4–1 home win over Hartlepool United, in which Steve Bull scored his first Wolves hat-trick, and they finished fourth – one place short of automatic promotion, which placed in them in the promotion/relegation playoffs. They won 2–0 at Colchester United in the semi-final first leg, and went through after a goalless draw in the second leg. However, they surprisingly lost the final first leg 1–0 at Aldershot, and another 1–0 defeat in the return leg three days later meant that the promotion dream was put on hold for another season.

1987–88 began with a visit to Football League newcomers Scarborough, who held them to a 2–2 draw. However, they soon found their winning ways and ended the season as Fourth Division champions.

They also won the Sherpa Van Trophy, beating Burnley 2–0 at Wembley Stadium in front of more than 80,000 spectators – well over half of them Wolves fans. Steve Bull was instrumental in this very first stage of the club's revival, scoring 34 league goals and a total of 52 in all competitions.

The 1988–89 season began with Wolves losing 3–1 to Bury at Gigg Lane, but they soon found their winning ways and by the time of their 6–0 home win over Preston North End on 26 November 1988, in which the still prolific Steve Bull scored four goals, a second successive promotion was looking increasingly likely. It was sealed at the end of the season, as Wolves won the Third Division title and became the first team to be champions of all four English Football League divisions. Bull totalled 37 goals in the league and 50 in all competitions, making him the first English league player to reach the 50-goal margin in successive seasons.

In 1989–90, there were frequent signs that Wolves could challenge for a unique third successive promotion. After a five-match win-less start to the season, they won 3–1 at Ipswich Town on 16 September 1989 and two weeks later crushed Portsmouth – who had been in the First Division when Wolves had been in the Fourth – 5–0. On New Year's Day 1990, Wolves began the new decade on the highest possible note, winning 4–1 at promotion chasing Newcastle United with Steve Bull scoring four goals. Bull's first season for Wolves at this level saw him maintain his reputation as a first class goalscorer with 25 goals in the league and 27 in all competitions, but Wolves just missed out on promotion – a disappointment which the fans would become accustomed to over the next two decades – having narrowly missed out on the playoffs.

== The Hayward years ==
In May 1990, Wolverhampton Wanderers was bought by lifelong supporter Jack Hayward, who immediately set about funding a comprehensive rebuild of the club's mostly decrepit ground to meet the new government regulations of the early 1990s, with the Stan Cullis Stand erected on the site of the North Bank in 1992, and the Billy Wright Stand replacing the Waterloo Road Stand in August 1993. The renovated stadium was officially opened on 7 December 1993, marked by a prestigious friendly with Honvéd, the Hungarian team who had been beaten in one of Molineux's most famous original floodlit friendlies.

With the stadium completed, Hayward gave the club its first substantial investment into its playing side since the late 1970s. While stadium work was prioritised in the early 1990s, the club under manager Graham Turner had consolidated in midtable but failed to make any inroads toward promotion to the top flight (now the newly formed Premier League). The summer of 1993 saw the first recruits in a heavily funded bid for promotion that would characterise much of Hayward's reign, although by March 1994 their play-off chances were fading and Turner quit, making way for the tenureship of former England manager Graham Taylor.

Wolves under Taylor completed their best finish in the Football League structure in over a decade, but they were denied promotion after losing 2–3 to Bolton Wanderers on aggregate in the play-off semi finals, and Taylor was soon ousted under fan pressure in November 1995 after only one full season as Wolves – now bearing the burden of being promotion favourites – made a slow start to the 1995–96 season. His successor Mark McGhee inspired a brief turnaround in fortunes and as late as March they were just outside the play-off zone, but poor form returned and by the end of the season they had finished 20th – just two places above the drop zone and their lowest league finish since they slipped into Fourth Division a decade earlier. The 1996–97 season was far stronger, but they were pipped to the second automatic promotion place by Barnsley and lost to Crystal Palace in the play-off semi-finals.

Although reaching the FA Cup semi-finals a year later, McGhee was dismissed in November 1998 as Wolves were slipping out of contention for the play-off places. His assistant Colin Lee took over but the club just missed out on the play-offs. With a far more limited budget than his two predecessors enjoyed, Lee could only guide the club to a second successive seventh-place finish in 1999–2000. He was dismissed in December 2000 after a poor run of form left Wolves just a few places above the drop zone.

Former Southampton manager Dave Jones was named as Lee's successor in January 2001, and Wolves improved during the second half of the 2000–01 season, but their dismal early season form counted against them and they were unable to achieve anything more than a mid-table finish. The close season saw heavy investment into the team, which helped them spend much of the 2001–02 season in the top two places. However, an end of season slump saw them pipped to automatic promotion by arch rivals West Bromwich Albion. Defeat at the hands of Norwich City in the play-off semi-finals finally put paid to their promotion hopes.

Wolves experienced sporadic form during the early part of 2002–03, and thus were never in contention for the automatic promotion places. The team turned the corner with a thrilling 3–2 FA Cup win over Newcastle United, going on to lose just two of their 20 league games after this, securing them 5th place and a play-off semi-final clash against newly promoted Reading. Victory in both legs earned Wolves a place in the Play-off Final against Sheffield United, their first play-off final at their fourth attempt. In the Millennium Stadium-staged final, three first half goals from Mark Kennedy, Nathan Blake and Kenny Miller, respectively, were enough to earn Wolves a long-awaited place in the Premiership, after 19 years in the lower echelons of English football.

Their debut season in the Premier League was tough, with key players Matt Murray and Joleon Lescott injured for the entire season, and several others absent from the start. Their spending power to strengthen the team was relatively low as Hayward instead opted to put the club up for sale. Despite these setbacks, Wolves overcame their seven-game winless start to eventually achieve some commendable results, in particular a 1–0 win over Manchester United. However, failing to win a single away game meant that their relegation battle was ultimately lost, and they finished bottom of the table on goal difference, bracketed together on 33 points with the two other relegated teams.

Despite hopes for an immediate return to the top flight, their 2004–05 campaign began dismally, and at one point the side sunk as low as 19th place. Following a 0–1 defeat at Gillingham, a side Wolves had beaten 6–0 just eighteen months previous, Jones was sacked at the beginning of November.

Another former England coach was hired the following month, as Glenn Hoddle was appointed on a rolling one-year contract. Under Hoddle, Wolves lost only one of their final 25 league games, but drew 15 to finish ninth in the final table – not enough to qualify for the play-offs. Wolves then finished a disappointing seventh in 2005–06 as fan discontent grew, disenchanted with the lack of passion and pride from the team, including from Hoddle himself who had not moved to the area. Though the board expressed no displeasure with Hoddle publicly, with Jez Moxey affirming his faith in the under fire manager, the season had been frowned on by both local media and the fan base. However, few had anticipated Hoddle's sudden resignation mere moments before England's World Cup quarter-final clash with Portugal.

== Changes in management and ownership ==
Following the exit of Hoddle in pre-season in 2006, Wolves staged a complete clearout, stripping the squad and wage bill down and appointing former Republic of Ireland and Sunderland manager Mick McCarthy. Wolves therefore commenced the 2006–07 season with only the bare bones of a first team squad and with the lowest expectations around the club in years.

McCarthy acknowledged the challenge, stating to local media "The initials MM on my top stand for Mick McCarthy, not Merlin the Magician", and quickly scraped together a squad, largely from the club's youth ranks, out of contract players and loan signings. After an inconsistent first half to the season, an impressive run of form followed and the club eventually made the play-offs, despite earlier expectations. They were paired with local rivals West Bromwich Albion in the semi-finals, where they lost out over two legs.

There was further change when businessman Steve Morgan took control of the club for a nominal £10 fee in return for a £30million investment into the club, resulting in the departure of Sir Jack Hayward (who remained as Life President and Club Hall of Fame member) after 17 years as chairman. The protracted takeover was finally completed on 9 August 2007.

Despite Morgan's arrival, the 2007–08 season ultimately brought more disappointment as the club failed to match the previous campaign's playoff finish. Poor form around Christmas saw them slump to mid-table and only a late rally, aided by the goal power of new signing Sylvan Ebanks-Blake, put them back in the promotion hunt. They finished just outside the final play-off spot on goal difference, one goal short of Watford.

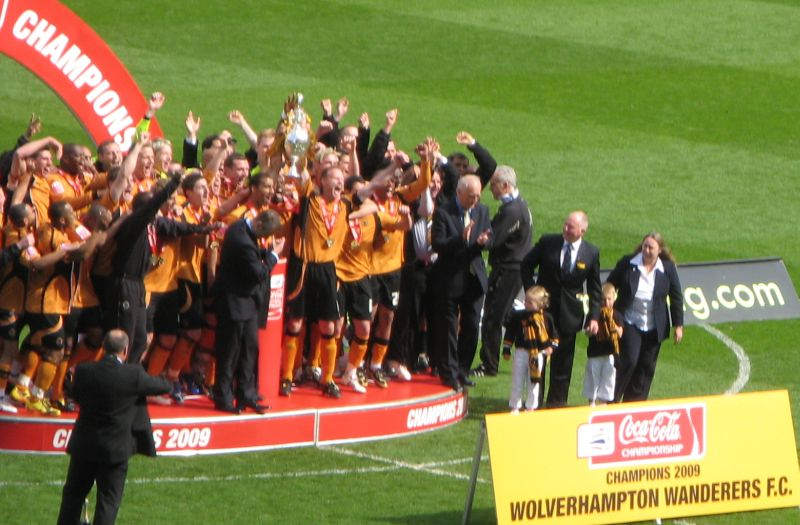
Football League Championship trophy presentation at Molineux on 3 May 2009

== Return to the Premier League ==
The 2008–09 season saw the club's strongest start since 1949–50, as an opening day draw preceded a run of seven consecutive wins. Fired by the goals of Ebanks-Blake and new signing Chris Iwelumo, the club hit the top of the table for the first time in years by the end of August and never left the automatic promotion spots after. A second run of seven consecutive wins tightened their grip on the lead by Christmas.

Despite a dismal start to 2009, the equally faltering form of their rivals allowed Wolves to retain the top spot. March saw a return to form with 13 points from a possible 15, strengthening their position at the top of the table that they had led since October. Promotion to the Premier League was finally confirmed on 18 April 2009 with a 1–0 win over Queens Park Rangers. The following week, Wolves clinched their first divisional title since the 1988–89 season.

The club's return to the Premier League saw their highest league position in 30 years, with a 15th-place finish granting survival. This marked the first time Wolves had survived a season at the highest level since 1981. This achievement was built on a solid defensive element to the team, countering its lack of goal-power, despite the addition of striker Kevin Doyle for a club record fee.

Their second consecutive Premier League campaign saw a closer brush with relegation, as they finished only one place above the drop zone. Wolves survived on the final day despite suffering a defeat, as relegation rivals Birmingham City and Blackpool both lost. However, despite being more seriously threatened by relegation, the overall points total was an improvement on the previous season.

The 2011–12 season was a poor one for the club, ending with the team in last place and relegated back to the Championship. Manager Mick McCarthy was sacked in February 2012 after a five-and-a-half year reign and replaced for the remainder of the season by, Terry Connor, but Connor failed to bring any upturn in their form, failing to win any of his 13 games in charge.

== Turbulent times and Record Breakers ==
The day before Wolves' final game of the 2011–12 season, the club announced that former Copenhagen manager Ståle Solbakken would take over for the following season.

Solbakken started to transform the squad with a flurry of signings in the summer most notably Bakary Sako, Tongo Doumbia and Björn Sigurðarson after a promising start the slump that had brought relegation from the premier league returned and despite at one time lifting the team to third place, they had slumped as low as 18th by the start of 2013. He was sacked in January 2013 following an FA Cup elimination by non-league Luton Town, which was his fourth consecutive defeat.

Solbakken was eventually replaced by former Doncaster manager Dean Saunders. Under Saunders' stewardship, Wolves' situation continued to decline, there was a brief period in which results improved but once again the team became caught in another relegation battle. On the last day of the season it was confirmed that, for the first time since 1989, Wolves would be competing in the third tier of English football and the first English team to drop two divisions in successive seasons twice; Saunders was dismissed following relegation, having only held the post for four months. Kenny Jackett was appointed in May 2013 in the re-titled position of head coach. Jackett reinvigorated Wolves through a successful assault on League One, many of the first team squad from the previous two seasons was frozen out, labelled as the "Bomb Squad" most notably Jamie O'hara, Roger Johnson and Stephen Ward was left to play either in the reserves or in O'hara's case train with the under 21s. Wolves were promoted as champions at the first attempt with a record number of points at the end of the 2013–14 season, whilst setting numerous club records in the process. Their first match back in the Championship tier was against recently relegated Norwich City on 10 August which Wolves won 1–0, continuing their impressive home form from the previous campaign. Wolves finished the 2014–15 season seventh in the Championship, missing out on the play-offs on goal difference only.

On 28 September 2015, it was announced that owner Steve Morgan was seeking a buyer for Wolves after eight years in charge of the club and was stepping down from the club's board with immediate effect. Wolves struggled to a fourteenth-place finish in the Championship in 2015–16.

== Ownership by Fosun International ==
On 21 July 2016, it was confirmed that Fosun International had bought parent company of the club, W.W. (1990) Ltd. from Steve Morgan and his own company Bridgemere Group, for £45 million, with Jez Moxey stepping down from his role as a CEO (he was replaced by managing director Laurie Dalrymple).

Days later, the new regime announced that Kenny Jackett's contract with the club had been terminated and former Italian international Walter Zenga was appointed. Zenga was sacked after just 14 league games though and Paul Lambert appointed as his successor in November 2016. However, at the conclusion of the season, Lambert too was removed, after Wolves laboured to finish fifteenth in the Championship. Former FC Porto boss Nuno Espírito Santo replaced Lambert a day after the latter's departure.

On 10 June 2017, Jeff Shi, one of the executive directors of the club (as well as one of the two directors of W.W. (1990)), was nominated as the executive chairman of the board. He moved from China to Wolverhampton in the summer 2017.

Wolves were promoted to the Premier League at the end of the 2017–18 season, Fosun's second season as the club's owners. When Wolverhampton Wanderers's accounts covering the 2017–18 season were published on 5 March 2019, they recorded a pre-tax loss of £57.16 million, of which around £20 million was due to bonuses paid to staff and players for achieving promotion to the Premier League. It was noted that the loss, which was more than double the loss in the previous financial year, represented a deficit of more than a £1 million per week.

Wolverhampton Wanderers's return to the Premier League resulted in a 7th-place finish, their highest position in the top division since finishing 6th in 1979–80. As a result of that season's league winners Manchester City winning both that season's EFL Cup and FA Cup, this position also earned them a spot in the qualification rounds of UEFA Europa League, thus invoking their first continental campaign since 1980–81. They entered the second qualifying round where they won 6–1 on aggregate against Crusaders of Northern Ireland, won 8–0 on aggreagate against Pyunik of Armenia in the third qualifying round and won 5–3 on aggregate against Torino in the play-off round to advance to the group stage. There, they were drawn to play Slovan Bratislava, Braga and Beşiktaş home and away between September and December 2019. Finishing as runners-up to Braga in the group stage, they defeated La Liga team Espanyol 6–3 on aggregate in the Round of 32 and Olympiacos of Greece 2–1 on aggregate in the Round of 16 over two legs (12 March 2020 and 6 August 2020) to reach the quarter-final stage. In the quarter-finals, Wolves lost to that season's eventual winners Sevilla 0–1 on 11 August 2020 in a modified single-leg tie played in a neutral venue in Germany due to the COVID-19 pandemic in Europe. Wolves replicated their previous season's 7th-place finish in the Premier League in 2019–20 but with two more points and only missed out on a return to continental competition, both on goal difference and Arsenal winning that season's FA Cup.

Wolves suffered a difficult 2020–21 season which was played almost entirely without crowds due to the COVID-19 pandemic. The club lost their talismanic striker Raúl Jiménez to a season-ending injury (a fractured skull) in an away game at Arsenal on 29 November 2020, and subsequently struggled for goals for the remainder of the campaign. Wolves finished the season in 13th place with 45 points. The club announced on 21 May 2021 that head coach Nuno Espírito Santo would leave the club "by mutual consent" after the final game of the season against Manchester United on 23 May 2021.

On 9 June 2021 Wolves announced the appointment of former Benfica head coach Bruno Lage as Espírito Santo's replacement. The 2021–22 season was a mixed one for Wolves under Lage: after losing the first three games 1–0, the team's fortunes improved significantly to the point that the team were seventh in the league by the end of January which handed Lage that month's Premier League Manager of the Month award and within touching distance of fourth place, but the season petered out with only two points being taken from the last seven fixtures and finished in 10th place with 51 points. As with the previous season, goal-scoring proved problematic for Wolves, with only 38 goals in 38 games for an average of a goal per game.

Wolves parted company with or sacked Bruno Lage on 2 October 2022 after 8 games of the 2022–23 season with only one win and just 3 goals scored, ending his tenure after 16 months. On 5 November 2022, Wolverhampton Wanderers announced that Julen Lopetegui would become the new manager of the club, with his official start date set for 14 November 2022. Lopetegui’s first game ended in a 2-0 victory over Gillingham in the EFL Cup on 20 December 2022. Lopetegui’s first league game was on 26 December and ended in a frantic 2-1 win away to Everton. Rayan Aït-Nouri’s 95th minute winner was enough to seal the victory. Lopetegui’s first home league win came on 14 January 2023, when West Ham were defeated 1-0. Wolves eventually secured safety after a 1-0 victory at home against Midlands rivals Aston Villa, before going on to finish 13th.

As the 2023-24 season approached, Lopetegui grew increasingly more frustrated at Wolves’ lack of spending and failure to substantially replace the many players they let go, such as Ruben Neves, Raúl Jiménez, Joao Moutinho and many other key players. This led to him leaving and being replaced with Gary O'Neil. O'Neil, against expectations, guided Wolves to a comfortable 14th place finish and could have taken Wolves to Wembley in the FA Cup had it not been for two late Coventry goals that saw the sky blues win the tie 3-2. On 28 January 2024, Wolves faced fierce rivals West Brom in the FA cup, and the fixture marked the first derby to be played in front of fans since 2012. O’Neil’s side went on to win 2-0, ending an almost 28 year wait for a Wolves side to win at The Hawthorns. However, the tie was marred by fan trouble, and was abandoned for over half an hour.

Ahead of the 24-25 season, O’Neil and his back room staff signed new four year deals to keep them there until 2028. However, poor form from the end of the previous season, and a dismal start to the new season, in which Wolves had only accumulated nine points in sixteen games, O’Neil was subsequently sacked on 15 December and was replaced with Vítor Pereira on 19 December. Pereira took strong steps forward, guiding Wolves to a 16th place finish, 17 points clear of the relegation zone, having been appointed when Wanderers were 5 points inside. From late March through April, Pereira oversaw Wolves’ greatest winning run of recent times. Matching a run that had last happened in September/October of 1970, Wolves endured a six game winning run, briefly becoming Europe’s most in form team amongst the big 5 leagues.. Despite the positive end to the season, the 2025–26 season started on a more appalling note than the previous season. This led to Vítor Pereira’s sacking on November 2 2025. He was replaced by Rob Edwards, who, despite managing to garner some positives, was unable to save the club from relegation. That so being confirmed on April 21 2026.
