= Shrewsbury Engineers F.C. =

Shrewsbury Engineers
- Full name: Shrewsbury Engineers Football Club
- Nickname: the Engineers
- Founded: 1876
- Dissolved: 1881
- Ground: Underdale
- President: G. J. Holt
- Secretary: David Rees, J. C. Stone

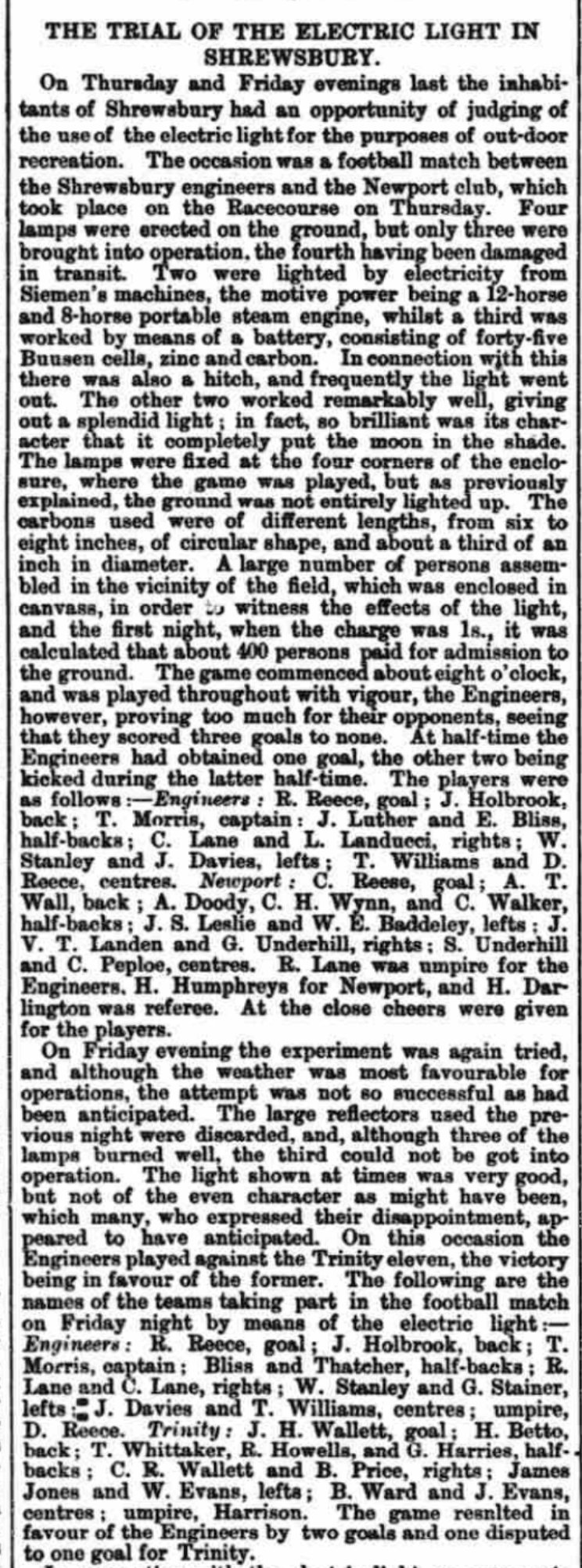
Trial of floodlit football in Shrewsbury, Eddowes' Shrewsbury Journal, 11 December 1878. Shrewsbury Engineers v Newport and Engineers v Trinity.

Shrewsbury Engineers F.C. was a football club based in Shrewsbury, England.

== History ==
The first reference to the Shrewsbury Engineers is as an athletic club in July 1878, although the club had been in existence since 1876; its earliest known match was a 2–0 win over Shifnal in October 1878. The same month they played away against Aston Villa. before hosting Villa in March 1879

The club was the region's representative in the Birmingham Senior Cup in 1878–79, but lost at home to Wednesbury Strollers. At the end of 1878, the club experimented with hosting floodlit matches, the Monkmoor pitch being surrounded by 10' high canvas; four Siemens lights were put up, although only two worked properly.

By 1879 the club had 40 to 50 members, making it around half the size of the more established Shrewsbury club. The club reached the final of the Shropshire Senior Cup that year, although the run to the final was not without controversy. Shrewsbury F.C. refused to turn up to a semi-final replay with the Engineers "entirely owing to the ungentlemanly conduct of the Engineers, whose conduct was of such a description as to make the Shrewsbury team wisely decline to ever meet them again".

The final itself, against Newport, ended in a 1–1 draw, the Engineers protesting vainly against both the Newport goal (holding the match up for 9 minutes) and the eligibility of one of the players, The replay also ended in a draw, the Engineers sitting back on an early Groom goal and conceding with 4 minutes remaining. The match was finally decided at the fourth attempt - by which time it had been agreed to play half-an-hour extra time if the 90 minutes ended level - in front of 2,000 spectators, at Newport's Audley Avenue ground; curiously all four matches took place in Newport, and this time the home side won 2–1, with a late goal from S. Underhill. The clubs met again in Newport in the Birmingham Senior Cup in 1879–80, Newport again winning, with an Engineers protest unanimously dismissed.

The club did however win the Shropshire Cup in 1879–80, beating Oswestry in the final, thanks to a goal from Lane; this time the Engineers had had the advantage hosting the final. The club however did not immediately get its hands on the trophy, as Mr Ward, the secretary of previous holders Newport, refused to hand it over until the Shropshire FA paid him the £10 which he had contributed to make up the shortfall between the Shropshire FA's contribution to its manufacture and the actual cost.

Despite this success, the club was being pressed financially. Subscriptions and gate money for 1879–80 were just under £29, while expenses were nearly £27, the bulk being the £9 14/6 cost of hiring Underdale.

The club resigned from the Birmingham & District Football Association in September 1880 and entered the Welsh Cup for the only time, in preference to the Birmingham Senior Cup. The Engineers were drawn at home to Newtown White Star in the first round and lost 1–0, but the Engineers successfully protested about the referee's eligibility to control the match (prompted by his decision to disallow an Engineers goal, "a decision that gave great dissatisfaction"), so the Welsh Football Association appointed Mr Manners, its secretary, for the second attempt, taking place at the Racecourse Ground. The re-play ended goalless before White Stars won through.

The club's independent existence ended at the start of the 1881–82 season, when it merged into the Shrewsbury Castle Blues, who had ended the Engineers' defence of the Shropshire Cup at the first round stage. The name was briefly revived from 1883 to 1885, and again in 1887, playing at the same ground, but with none of the former players.

== Colours ==
Mr Rees did not include the club colours in the club's sparse entry to the 1879 Football Annual; clubs in Shrewsbury tended to wear combinations of blue and white. It is likely the club wore blue, as in a match against the Trench club in 1880, three of the Trench players caused confusion by wearing the same colours as the Engineers, and Trench's regular jerseys were also blue.

== Ground ==
The club's first matches were played at Monkmoor. In 1879 the club obtained a tenure at Underdale, the ground being a field next to Mr Gough's hotel.

== Honours ==
- Shropshire Senior Cup

Winners (1): 1880

== Notable players ==
Goalkeeper Robert McMillan and half-back William Bell were both Welsh internationals while at the Engineers, playing in Wales' unexpected 1–0 win over England in 1881.
