= Queens Garden (restaurant) =

Coordinates: 52°4′46.38″N 4°18′19.21″E

- Interactive map of Queens Garden

Restaurant information
- Food type: French
- Location: Molenstraat 53, The Hague, 2513 BJ, Netherlands
- Website: Official website

Oueens Garden is a defunct restaurant located in the Parkhotel Den Haag in The Hague, Netherlands. It was a fine dining restaurant that was awarded one Michelin star in 1960 and retained that rating until 1971. The restaurant lost its star in 1972, after the restaurant changed course.

Henri Frisch, also owner of 't Koetshuis in Rhenen, was director of the hotel and restaurant until his death in 1964.

The building is located beside Noordeinde Palace. Owner of the restaurant is the Levi Lassen Foundation.

== History ==
In 1912, vegetarian hotel-restaurant Pomona opened on the Molenstraat. Some years later, it changed its name to Parkhotel. By then the hotel had made her name with the famous restaurant Queens Garden. After the purchase of the adjacent "Hotel De Zalm", in 1968, the name was changed into Parkhotel De Zalm. During the extensive renovation in 1986, the name was reverted to Parkhotel. That renovation also signalled the end of the former Queens Garden/Queens Room when the restaurant was split into two rooms: "Garden Room" and "Park Room".

== See also ==
- List of Michelin starred restaurants in the Netherlands
