= Queens Park, Victoria =

There are three places called Queens Park in Victoria, Australia:

- Queens Park, Newtown, Victoria
- Queens Park, Lorne, Victoria
- Queens Park, Moonee Ponds in Victoria
