= Whitchurch F.C. =

- Full name: Whitchurch Football Club
- Founded: October 1871
- Dissolved: 1985
Home colours

Whitchurch Football Club was an English football club based in Whitchurch, Shropshire. They formed in October 1871 and dissolved in 1985. They competed in the Welsh Cup, despite being English, and were runners-up in 1906 and 1907.

== Honours ==
=== League ===
- The Combination

Winners : 1906, 1907, 1911

=== Cups ===
- Welsh Cup

Runner-up : 1906, 1907

- Shropshire Senior Cup

Winner: 1911, 1924

== Notable players ==
- George Bertram - previously League player with Fulham and Brentford.
- William Bossons - goalkeeper in 1928-29, previously League player with Macclesfield Town and Nelson
