= Shropshire & District League =

Shropshire League
- Founded: 1890
- Folded: 1900
- Country: England
- Other club from: Wales

The Shropshire & District League was a football league in Shropshire, and the surrounding area. It was played from 1890 to 1900, and was also known as the Shropshire League.

== Champions ==
- 1890–91: Ironbridge
- 1891–92: Wolverhampton Wanderers reserves
- 1892–93: Newtown
- 1893–94: Wellington St George's
- 1894–95: Wellington St George's
- 1895–96: Hereford Town
- 1896–97: Wellington Town
- 1897–98: Wellington Town
- 1898–99: Ironbridge
- 1899–1900: Ironbridge
