= Welsh Cup =

Association football tournament in Wales

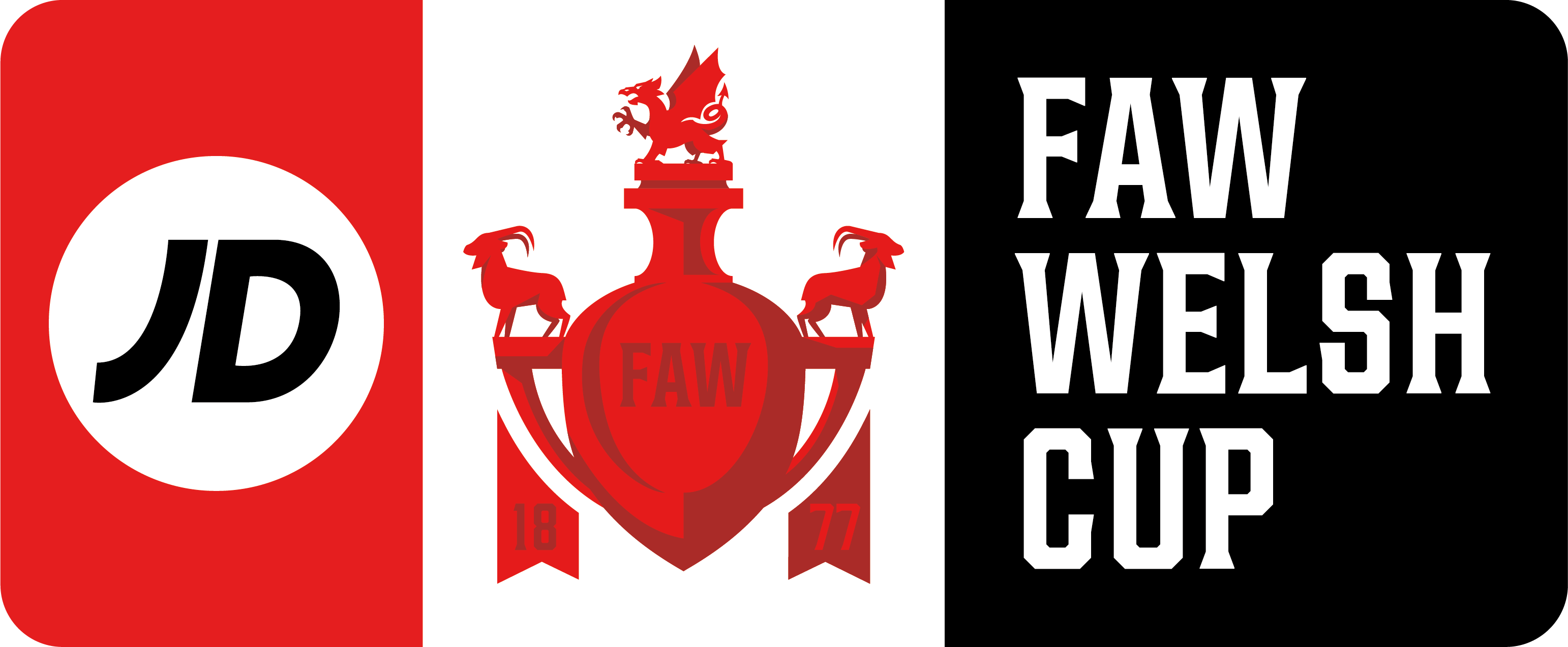
- Founded: 1877; 149 years ago
- Region: Wales
- Teams: 253
- Qualifier for: UEFA Conference League
- Current champions: Caernarfon Town (1st title)
- Most championships: Wrexham (23 titles)
- 2026–27 Welsh Cup

The FAW Welsh Cup (Welsh: Cwpan Cymdeithas Pêl-droed Cymru), currently known as the JD Welsh Cup for sponsorship reasons, is a knock-out association football competition contested annually by teams in the Welsh football league system. It is considered the most prestigious of the cup competitions in domestic Welsh football.

The Football Association of Wales (FAW) is the organising body of this competition, which has been run (except during the two World Wars and the COVID-19 pandemic) every year since its inception in 1877–78.

In the early years of organised football in Wales, football was very much the sport of north Wales rather than the rugby union playing south – the FAW was founded in Wrexham in 1876, and Wrexham remained the site of the FAW's head office until 1986; it was not until 1912 that a southern team, Cardiff City, won the Welsh Cup for the first time.

The winning team qualifies to play in the following season's UEFA Conference League (previously teams qualified for the UEFA Cup Winners' Cup, which was discontinued in 1999, and until 2021, qualified for the UEFA Europa League).

== Participants ==
Until 1995, Welsh clubs playing in the Welsh or English leagues were invited to play in the Welsh Cup. On occasion some English clubs, mostly teams from border areas (for example, Chester City, Crewe Alexandra, Tranmere Rovers, Hereford United and Shrewsbury Town), were also invited to participate. However, in the event of an English club winning the Welsh Cup, they were not allowed to progress to the European Cup Winners' Cup. Instead, the best placed Welsh club in the Welsh Cup competition would take the European place.

From 1996 to 2011, only clubs playing in the Welsh football league system were allowed to enter the Welsh Cup. This rule excluded the six Welsh clubs who played in the English football league system: Swansea City, Colwyn Bay, Merthyr Tydfil (replaced by Merthyr Town), Newport County, Cardiff City and Wrexham. On 20 April 2011, the Football Association of Wales invited these six clubs to rejoin the Welsh Cup for the 2011–12 season, but only Merthyr Town, Newport County and Wrexham accepted.

In March 2012, UEFA stated that Welsh clubs playing in the English football league system could not qualify for European competitions via the Welsh Cup but they could qualify via the English league and cup competitions, hence they were subsequently again excluded from the Welsh Cup. Colwyn Bay joined the Welsh league system in 2019, thus becoming eligible to compete in the Welsh Cup again.

== History ==
Between the 1961–62 and 1984–85 seasons, the final was played as a two-leg match, originally on a points basis rather than aggregate score. In the 1985–86 season, it reverted to a one-game format (though a replay was required in the first two seasons), then changed to have a single game decided by extra time and penalties as necessary.

With six wins, Shrewsbury Town hold the record for the most times an English team has won the Cup, a record that will remain unbroken because English teams have not been allowed to compete in the cup since 1995. The last English winner of the Welsh Cup was Hereford United in 1990.

== Performance ==
=== Performance by club ===
Club	Winners	Runners-up	Final appearances	Last final
Wrexham (Note: Indicates a Welsh club that plays or has played in the English system.)	23	22	45	1995
Cardiff City	22	10	32	1995
Swansea City (Note: Have played in the final as Swansea Town and Swansea City.)	10	8	18	1991
The New Saints (Note: Have played in the final as Llansantffraid and Total Network Solutions.)	10	4	14	2025
Bangor City	8	10	18	2013
Cefn Druids	8	6	14	2012
Shrewsbury Town (England)	6	3	9	1985
Barry Town	6	1	7	2003
Chirk A.A.A.	5	1	6	1894
Rhyl (Note: Italics indicates the club no longer exists.)	4	4	8	2006
Chester City (England)	3	10	13	1970
Merthyr Tydfil	3	2	5	1987
Wellington Town (England)	3	–	3	1940
Connah's Quay Nomads	2	3	5	2025
Oswestry United (England)	2	–	2	1901
Crewe Alexandra (England)	2	–	2	1937
Newtown (Note: In essence a continuation of White Stars.)	1	3	4	2015
Hereford United (England)	1	3	4	1990
Aberystwyth Town	1	3	4	2018
Connah's Quay & Shotton	1	2	3	1929
Newport County	1	2	3	1987
Carmarthen Town	1	2	3	2007
Llanelli	1	2	3	2011
Flint Town United	1	2	3	2026
Newtown White Stars (Note: In essence continued as Newtown after a 3 year hiatus.)	1	1	2	1881
Oswestry (England)	1	1	2	1885
Tranmere Rovers (England)	1	1	2	1935
Lovell's Athletic	1	1	2	1959
Bala Town	1	1	2	2023
Ebbw Vale	1	–	1	1926
Bristol City (England)	1	–	1	1934
Caernarfon Town	1	–	1	2026
South Liverpool (England)	1	–	1	1939
Borough United	1	–	1	1963
Inter Cardiff	1	–	1	1999
Prestatyn Town	1	–	1	2013
Aberdare Athletic	–	4	4	1923
Pontypridd	–	3	3	1921
Cwmbran Town	–	3	3	2002
Westminster Rovers	–	2	2	1892
Whitchurch (England)	–	2	2	1906
Northwich Victoria (England)	–	2	2	1910
Kidderminster Harriers (England)	–	2	2	1989
Ruthin	–	1	1	1880
Davenham (England)	–	1	1	1887
Aberaman	–	1	1	1903
Ton Pentre	–	1	1	1922
Merthyr Town	–	1	1	1924
Stourbridge (England)	–	1	1	1974
Hednesford Town (England)	–	1	1	1992
Afan Lido	–	1	1	2007
Port Talbot Town	–	1	1	2010
Penybont	–	1	1	2022

== See also ==
- FAW Premier Cup
- Football in Wales
- List of football clubs in Wales
- List of stadiums in Wales by capacity
- Welsh football league system
- Welsh League Cup
- FAW Trophy
