= Telford United F.C. =

- Full name: Telford United Football Club
- Nicknames: The Bucks; The Lilywhites
- Founded: 1872 (as Parish Church Institute)
- Dissolved: 2004; 22 years ago
- Ground: Bucks Head
- 2003–04: Football Conference, 12th
Home colours

Telford United Football Club was an English football club based in Telford, Shropshire.

The club existed under various names for a total of 132 years from its formation in 1872. The club was a founder member of the Alliance Premier League (later renamed the Football Conference) in 1979 and played at this level for 25 years. The club was known for memorable exploits in the FA Cup during the early 1980s and in the 2003–04 FA Cup as well as the 1970–71, 1982–83 and 1988–89 FA Trophies.

After Telford United was wound up in 2004, supporters established a new club named AFC Telford United.

== Club history ==
=== Parish Church Institute & Wellington Town ===
The club was formed in Wellington, Shropshire in late 1872 as Parish Church Institute, and in 1879 was renamed Wellington Town. They won the Shropshire Senior Cup in 1881, and in 1890 were founder members of the Shropshire League. In 1898 they joined the Birmingham & District League. In 1901 they switched to The Combination and won the Welsh Cup, before returning to the Birmingham & District League in 1902. They won the Welsh Cup for a second time in 1905–06.

They left the league again at the end of the 1905–06 season, but returned in 1908. In 1920–21 they won the league for the first time, and in 1925–26 reached the first round of the FA Cup for the first time, something they repeated for the next two seasons and again in 1929–30. In 1930–31 they reached the second round. The club won back-to-back titles in 1934–35 and 1935–36, before switching to the Cheshire County League in 1938. However, they returned to the Birmingham & District League after a single season and went on to win the league and the Welsh Cup again in 1939–40.

After World War II they joined the Cheshire County League, winning the title in 1945–46 and 1946–47 and again in 1951–52. In 1958 they moved up to the expanded Southern League, and were placed in the Premier Division for the 1959–60 season after a transitional year in the North-West Division.

=== Telford United ===
In 1969 the club was renamed Telford United in recognition of the new town which had grown around Wellington. In their first season under the new name they reached the final of the first FA Trophy, but lost 2–0 to Macclesfield Town. They reached the final again the following year and won 3–2 against Hillingdon Borough. Following a third-place finish in 1978–79 they were founder members of the new Alliance Premier League. In 1982, when Alliance Premier League champions Runcorn failed to meet Football League stadium requirements, Telford applied to join the Football League, but their application was unsuccessful.

During the 1980s the club had several good runs in the FA Cup, reaching the second round in 1982–83 when they knocked out Third Division Wigan Athletic before losing to Tranmere Rovers in a replay. They also reached the final of the FA Trophy again, winning 2–1 against Northwich Victoria. The following season they reached the fourth round, beating Stockport County, Northampton Town and Rochdale before losing to Derby County. In 1984–85 they reached the fifth round, knocking out Lincoln City, Preston North End, Bradford City and Darlington before losing to Everton. They continued to claim League scalps, beating Stockport in 1985–86, Burnley in 1986–87 and Stoke City in 1991–92. They reached the FA Trophy final again in 1987–88, but lost to Enfield in a replay. The following season they reached the Trophy final for a fifth time, this time defeating Macclesfield 1–0.

In the 2003–04 FA Cup the club knocked out both Brentford and Crewe Alexandra before losing to eventual finalists Millwall. They also reached the semi-finals of the FA Trophy, but lost on penalties to Canvey Island. They folded at the end of the season, due to the business failure of owner Andy Shaw in March, but the name was resurrected shortly afterwards by the creation of AFC Telford United.

== Colours ==
The club's traditional colours were white shirts and black shorts, although from at least 1885 to 1906 the club wore scarlet.

== Honours ==
As Wellington Town:

- Welsh Cup
  - Winners: 1901–02, 1905–06, 1939–40
- Cheshire County League
  - Champions: 1945–46, 1946–47, 1951–52
- Birmingham & District League
  - Champions: 1920–21, 1934–35, 1935–36, 1939–40

As Telford United F.C.:

- FA Trophy
  - Winners: 1970–71, 1982–83, 1988–89

== Club records ==
- Record attendance: 13,000 vs Shrewsbury Town, Shropshire Senior Cup Final.
- Record win: a 10-1 victory against Coleshill Town in the FA Trophy
- Best FA Cup performance: Fifth round, 1984–85
- Best FA Trophy performance: Winners 1970–71, 1982–83, 1988–89
