= List of football seasons involving Cefn Druids and its predecessor clubs =

Welsh football clubs competition

This is a list of seasons played by Cefn Druids and the various other clubs who the current club, formed in 1992, is descended from. It starts from the 1876–77 season, when the earliest ancestor club, Ruabon Druids FC began playing in competitive fixtures, to the most recent current season.

== History ==
It was reported that on October 6, 1872, the opening game of a Football Club for the district was played at Plasmadoc Park. Mr George Hampden Whalley was selected as the captain of the club. Whalley would later become club president.

It is claimed by the later successor club that Druids FC formed in 1872 when Plasmadoc FC merged with Ruabon Rovers and Ruabon Volunteers under the guidance of Llewelyn Kenrick. Contemporary sources refute this version of events, as in February 1873 Ruabon Rovers played a fixture against Ruabon Volunteers, which shows these clubs were both still Active after the proposed merger date. Ruabon Volunteers were also known as the 2nd Denbighshire Volunteers so were actually a Military team.

In September 1873 the club was still known as Ruabon Rovers as evidenced in the annual meeting of the club, where a number of influential people, later associated with Druids were present and held key roles, such as David and George Thomson. The issue of the club's foundation is further muddied when Llewelyn Kenrick was present at the founding of a football club in Ruabon in September 1873.

The name of the club appears interchangeable between Ruabon Rovers and Plasmadoc in 1873, and the club was often referred to as the Plasmadoc Club from 1874 up until 1876.

The name Druids does not appear in the local press until January 1876. By 1877 the club were commonly referred to as Druids Football Club.

The club were allowed to play at Plasmadoc Park by George Hammond Whalley MP. However following his death in 1878 Druids lost the use of the Plasmadoc Ground. Because of this, Druids were forced to withdraw form the 1878–79 edition of the Welsh Cup.

This meant Druids could no longer play home games, which resulted in many players, including Llewelyn Kenrick, leaving the club. The club briefly folded and did not play any further games until November 1879.

After World War I, Druids FC ceased to exist when they merged with Rhosymedre to form Rhosymedre Druids. Furthermore, Rhosymedre Druids subsequently merged with Acrefair United in 1929 to form Druids United.

Druids United existed in the local Welsh National League until 1992 when they merged with another local club Cefn Albion to form the current club Cefn Druids AFC.

The club is nicknamed 'The Ancients'. This originates with Druids FC being referred to as 'The Ancient Britons' in multiple historical sources as far back as 1893.

== Seasons ==
=== Key ===
Champions	Runners-up	Promoted	Relegated	* = Points Deduction

Season	Club	League									Welsh Cup	FA Cup	Welsh League Cup	Welsh Amateur Cup FAW Trophy	UEFA Europa League	Other
Season	Club	Division	P	W	D	L	F	A	Pts	Pos	Welsh Cup	FA Cup	Welsh League Cup	Welsh Amateur Cup FAW Trophy	UEFA Europa League	Other
1876-77	Druids											Withdrew				
1877-78	Druids										Runner Up	3R				
1878-79	Ruabon Druids										Withdrew					
1879-80	Ruabon Druids										Winners					
1880-81	Ruabon Druids										Winners					
1881-82	Ruabon Druids										Winners					
1882-83	Ruabon Druids										Runner Up	QF				
1883-84	Ruabon Druids										Runner Up					
1884-85	Ruabon Druids										Winners	4R				
1885-86	Ruabon Druids										Winners					
1886-87	Ruabon Druids										2R					
1887-88	Ruabon Druids										2R					
1888-89	Ruabon Druids										1R					
1889-90	Ruabon Druids										2R	1QR				
1890–91	Ruabon Druids	Welsh Senior League	10	7	1	2	45	14	13*	1	1R	2QR				
1891-92	Ruabon Druids	No record of club playing in any League									2R					Denbighshire Charity Cup Winners
1892–93	Ruabon Druids	Welsh Senior League	14	9	3	2	46	21	21	1	SF			SF		Denbighshire Charity Cup Runners Up
1893–94	Ruabon Druids	Welsh Senior League	14	10	2	2	59	19	22	2	4R			1R		
1894–95	Ruabon Druids	Welsh Senior League	15	7	4	4	50	32	18	3	3R			2R		
1895–96	Ruabon Druids	Welsh Senior League	12	4	5	3	26	22	13	3	1R			1R		
1896–97	Ruabon Druids	Welsh Senior League	14	10	3	1	49	19	23	1	4R	4QR		2R		
1897–98	Ruabon Druids	The Combination	24	9	3	12	43	46	21	10	Winners			2R		
1898–99	Ruabon Druids	The Combination	28	16	1	11	64	31	33	4	Winners			3R		Denbighshire Charity Cup Runners Up
1899–1900	Ruabon Druids	The Combination	16	9	3	4	38	28	21	3	Runner Up			3R		
1900–01	Ruabon Druids	Birmingham & District League	34	11	9	14	61	62	31	12	Runner Up	1QR		1R		
1901–02	Ruabon Druids	Birmingham & District League	34	12	4	18	54	82	28	13	3R			4R		
1902–03	Ruabon Druids	Birmingham & District League	34	13	5	16	48	58	31	11	SF			Winners		
1903–04	Ruabon Druids	Birmingham & District League	34	10	4	20	63	78	24	16	Winners			Runner Up		Denbighshire Charity Cup Winners
1904–05	Ruabon Druids	The Combination	26	7	5	14	29	54	19	13	4R			4R		
1905–06	Ruabon Druids	The Combination	28	14	5	9	52	46	33	4	4R			2R		
1906–07	Ruabon Druids	The Combination	26	6	6	14	29	70	18	13	2R					
1907–08	Ruabon Druids	The Combination	26	9	5	12	53	58	23	8	4R			PR		
1908–09	Ruabon Druids	The Combination	30	10	4	16	51	74	24	14	4R			2R		
1909–10	Ruabon Druids	The Combination	30	7	3	20	44	83	17	14	4R			2PR		
1910–11	Ruabon Druids	Liverpool County Combination Division 1	24	6	5	13	30	48	17	11	3R			PR		
1911–12	Ruabon Druids	Wrexham & District League Division 1	14	4	2	8	18	27	10	7	PR					
1912–13	Ruabon Druids	North Wales Alliance League	26	7	2	17	39	80	16	12	EPR					
1913-14	Ruabon Druids	No record of club playing in any League									2PR					
1914-15	Ruabon Druids	No record of club entering any competitions														
1915-1919	No Football played due to World War I															
1919-20	Rhosymedre	North Wales Alliance League Division 1	26	16	2	8	66	35	34	4						
1919-20	Acrefair Athletic	North Wales Alliance League Division 1	26	9	3	14	52	83	21	10				1R		
1920-21	Rhosymedre	North Wales Alliance League Division 1	29	19	3	4	76	20	41	1	1PR					
1920-21	Acrefair Athletic	North Wales Alliance League Division 1	26	13	3	10	58	47	29	6						
1921-22	Rhosymedre Druids	Welsh National League (North) Division 1	26	10	6	10	49	50	26	7	3PR					
1921-22	Acrefair Athletic	Welsh National League (North) Division 2 East	28	22	4	2	147	25	48	1						
1922-23	Rhosymedre Druids	Welsh National League (North) Division 1	28	6	2	20	33	82	14	15	3R					
1922-23	Acrefair United	Welsh National League (North) Division 1	28	11	4	13	50	70	26	8				Winners		
1923-34	Rhosymedre Druids	Welsh National League (North) Division 1	34	13	4	17	71	82	30	13	1R					
1923-34	Acrefair United	Welsh National League (North) Division 1	34	2	6	26	36	168	10	18	1R					
1924-25	Rhosymedre Druids	Welsh National League (North) Division 1	30	11	9	10	45	45	31	9	3R					
1924-25	Acrefair United	Welsh National League (North) Division 1	30	0	2	28	23	139	2	16	3R					
1925-26	Rhosymedre Druids	Welsh National League (North) Division 1	34	5	2	27	50	159	12	18	4R					
1925-26	Acrefair United	Wrexham & District League	24	13	6	5	79	53	32	3	3QR					
1926-27	Rhosymedre Druids	Welsh National League (North) Division 1	36	6	6	24	60	136	18	17	4R					
1926-27	Acrefair United	Wrexham & District League	21	13	4	4	75	36	30	2	3R					
1927-28	Rhosymedre Druids	Welsh National League (North) Division 1	34	11	0	23	77	121	20*	16	3R					
1928-29	Rhosymedre Druids	No record of club playing in any League									3R					
Merged with Acrefair United to form Druids United
1929-30	Druids United	Wrexham & District League	17	11	4	2	49	30	26	2	3R					
1930-31	Druids United	Wrexham & District League	20	7	2	11	42	56	16	9	1R					
1931-32	Druids United	Wrexham & District League	18	15	3	0	71	25	33	1	4R					
1932-33	Druids United	Wrexham & District League	24	11	3	10	59	63	25	5	2R					
1933-34	Druids United	Wrexham & District League	21	16	3	2	69	25	35	1	1R					
1934-35	Druids United	Wrexham & District League	18	10	4	4	52	34	24	2	2R					
1935-36	Druids United	Wrexham & District League	25	14	5	6	84	50	33	3	5R					
1936-37	Druids United	Wrexham & District League	21	15	1	5	67	40	31	1	1R					
1937-38	Druids United	Wrexham & District League	24	10	3	11	36	45	21	7	1R					
1938-39	Druids United	Wrexham & District League	14	6	3	5	34	24	15	4	2R					
1939-40	Druids United	No record of club playing in any League									Withdrew					
1940-1945	No Football played due to World War II															
1945-46	Druids United	No record of club playing in any League														
1946-47	Druids United	Welsh National League Senior Division	22	5	2	15	29	62	12	10	1R					
1947-48	Druids United	Welsh National League Senior Division	22	4	4	14	53	83	12	11						
1948-49	Druids United	Welsh National League Senior Division	28	7	5	16	60	102	19	12						
1949-50	Druids United	Welsh National League (Wrexham Area) Division One	32	15	7	10	77	78	37	5						
1950-51	Druids United	Welsh National League (Wrexham Area) Division One	30	26	1	3	124	36	53	1						
1951-52	Druids United	Welsh National League (Wrexham Area) Division One	30	15	3	12	86	69	33	6						
1952-53	Druids United	Welsh National League (Wrexham Area) Division One	30	20	3	7	98	51	43	2						
1953-54	Druids United	Welsh National League (Wrexham Area) Division One	30	18	4	8	100	72	40	4						
1954-55	Druids United	Welsh National League (Wrexham Area) Division One	30	17	6	7	92	45	30*	9						
1955-56	Druids United	Welsh National League (Wrexham Area) Division One	30	19	7	4	110	45	45	3						
1956-57	Druids United	Welsh National League (Wrexham Area) Division One	30	22	3	5	126	49	47	2						
1957-58	Druids United	Welsh National League (Wrexham Area) Division One	28	13	7	8	86	59	33	5						
1958-59	Druids United	Welsh National League (Wrexham Area) Division One	28	17	4	7	100	42	38	2						
1959-60	Druids United	Welsh National League (Wrexham Area) Division One	28	18	7	3	78	35	43	2						
1960-61	Druids United	Welsh National League (Wrexham Area) Division One	26	8	9	9	58	60	23*	8						
1961-62	Druids United	Welsh National League (Wrexham Area) Division One	28	8	6	14	57	63	22	11						
1962-63	Druids United	Welsh National League (Wrexham Area) Division One	30	11	2	17	62	77	24	12						
1963-64	Druids United	Welsh National League (Wrexham Area) Division One	30	16	6	8	76	50	38	5						
1964-65	Druids United	Welsh National League (Wrexham Area) Division One	28	11	4	13	60	77	26	9						
1965-66	Druids United	Welsh National League (Wrexham Area) Division One	30	6	3	21	62	115	15	15						
1966-67	Druids United	Welsh National League (Wrexham Area) Division One	30	12	4	14	84	85	28	9						
1967-68	Cefn Albion	Welsh National League (Wrexham Area) Division Three	36	23	4	9	128	77	50	5						
1967-68	Druids United	Welsh National League (Wrexham Area) Division One	30	14	3	13	67	64	31	8						
1968-69	Cefn Albion	Welsh National League (Wrexham Area) Division Three B	20	17	1	2	88	31	35	2						
1968-69	Druids United	Welsh National League (Wrexham Area) Division One	27	3	3	21	40	105	9	16						
1969-70	Cefn Albion	Welsh National League (Wrexham Area) Division Three B	22	19	2	1	90	20	40	1						
1969-70	Druids United	Welsh National League (Wrexham Area) Division Two	28	21	5	2	90	27	47	1						
1970-71	Cefn Albion	Welsh National League (Wrexham Area) Division Two	28	12	8	8	66	55	32	6						
1970-71	Druids United	Welsh National League (Wrexham Area) Division One	30	8	6	16	46	65	22	14						
1971-72	Cefn Albion	Welsh National League (Wrexham Area) Division Two	30	19	3	8	99	56	41	4						
1971-72	Druids United	Welsh National League (Wrexham Area) Division One	30	16	3	11	66	57	35	6						
1972-73	Cefn Albion	Welsh National League (Wrexham Area) Division Two	30	15	6	9	80	52	36	5						
1972-73	Druids United	Welsh National League (Wrexham Area) Division One	28	11	7	10	55	49	29	5						
1973-74	Cefn Albion	Welsh National League (Wrexham Area) Division Two	25	15	2	8	106	63	32	3						
1973-74	Druids United	Welsh National League (Wrexham Area) Division One	30	15	5	10	75	50	35	6						
1974-75	Cefn Albion	Welsh National League (Wrexham Area) Division Two	28	16	6	6	81	57	38	3						
1974-75	Druids United	Welsh National League (Wrexham Area) Division One	30	11	2	17	57	78	24	13						
1975-76	Cefn Albion	Welsh National League (Wrexham Area) Division Two	30	15	5	10	77	57	35	6						
1975-76	Druids United	Welsh National League (Wrexham Area) Division One	28	9	6	13	38	46	24	11						
1976-77	Cefn Albion	Welsh National League (Wrexham Area) Division Two	30	18	4	8	105	50	40	3						
1976-77	Druids United	Welsh National League (Wrexham Area) Division One	30	14	8	8	58	31	36	4						
1977-78	Cefn Albion	Welsh National League (Wrexham Area) Division Two	32	29	3	0	154	24	61	1						
1977-78	Druids United	Welsh National League (Wrexham Area) Division One	30	11	6	13	45	45	28	8						
1978-79	Cefn Albion	Welsh National League (Wrexham Area) Division One	30	18	10	2	66	20	46	2						
1978-79	Druids United	Welsh National League (Wrexham Area) Division One	30	12	7	11	58	57	31	6						
1979-80	Cefn Albion	Welsh National League (Wrexham Area) Division One	26	20	1	5	73	36	41	1						
1979-80	Druids United	Welsh National League (Wrexham Area) Division One	26	15	2	9	43	31	32	4						
1980-81	Cefn Albion	Welsh National League (Wrexham Area) Division One	30	24	4	2	99	25	52	1						
1980-81	Druids United	Welsh National League (Wrexham Area) Division One	30	8	7	15	47	51	23	10						
1981-82	Cefn Albion	Welsh National League (Wrexham Area) Division One	30	16	3	11	57	46	35	3						
1981-82	Druids United	Welsh National League (Wrexham Area) Division One	30	7	8	15	37	57	22	14						
1982-83	Cefn Albion	Welsh National League (Wrexham Area) Division One	30	10	7	13	56	58	27	10						
1982-83	Druids United	Welsh National League (Wrexham Area) Division One	30	4	4	22	29	84	12	16						
1983-84	Cefn Albion	Welsh National League (Wrexham Area) Division One	28	16	4	8	75	50	36	5						
1983-84	Druids United	Welsh National League (Wrexham Area) Division Two	28	10	4	14	57	54	24	9						
1984-85	Cefn Albion	Welsh National League (Wrexham Area) Premier Division	30	17	10	3	72	28	44	2						
1984-85	Druids United	Welsh National League (Wrexham Area) 1st Division	30	18	7	5	89	43	43	4						
1985-86	Cefn Albion	Welsh National League (Wrexham Area) Premier Division	30	10	6	14	50	53	26	13						
1985-86	Druids United	Welsh National League (Wrexham Area) 1st Division	30	14	5	11	79	51	33	6						
1986-87	Cefn Albion	Welsh National League (Wrexham Area) Premier Division	28	4	6	18	35	85	18	14						WNL League Cup Winners
1986-87	Druids United	Welsh National League (Wrexham Area) 1st Division	30	6	5	19	42	96	21	15						
1987-88	Cefn Albion	Welsh National League (Wrexham Area) Premier Division	30	11	4	15	48	63	37	11						
1987-88	Druids United	Welsh National League (Wrexham Area) 1st Division	30	9	6	15	61	65	33	10						
1988-89	Cefn Albion	Welsh National League (Wrexham Area) Premier Division	30	8	6	16	45	67	30	12						NEWFA Cup Runners Up
1988-89	Druids United	Welsh National League (Wrexham Area) 1st Division	26	7	7	12	39	57	28	10						
1989-90	Cefn Albion	Welsh National League (Wrexham Area) Premier Division	30	8	8	14	44	69	32	12						
1989-90	Druids United	Welsh National League (Wrexham Area) 1st Division	26	13	6	7	64	49	45	5						
1990-91	Cefn Albion	Welsh National League (Wrexham Area) Premier Division	26	6	5	15	38	51	23	11	2R					
1990-91	Druids United	Welsh National League (Wrexham Area) Premier Division	26	3	8	15	23	64	17	13						
1991-92	Cefn Albion	Welsh National League (Wrexham Area) Premier Division	26	6	4	16	25	54	22	13	1R					
1991-92	Druids United	Welsh National League (Wrexham Area) Premier Division	26	2	4	20	19	62	10	14						
Merger of Cefn Albion and Druids United to form Cefn Druids
1992-93	Cefn Druids	Cymru Alliance	28	10	5	13	46	41	35	7	2R					NEWFA Cup Winners
1993-94	Cefn Druids	Cymru Alliance	34	14	5	15	74	72	47	8	3R					
1994-95	Cefn Druids	Cymru Alliance	34	19	3	12	73	51	60	5	3R					
1995-96	Cefn Druids	Cymru Alliance	36	19	4	13	82	57	61	8	1R					
1996-97	Cefn Druids	Cymru Alliance	34	19	8	7	74	50	65	5	3R					
1997-98	Cefn Druids	Cymru Alliance	36	21	12	3	100	30	75	3	3R					
1998-99	Flexsys Cefn Druids	Cymru Alliance	30	22	3	5	105	36	69	1	3R					NEWFA Cup Winners
1999-00	Flexsys Cefn Druids	League of Wales	34	13	2	19	44	63	41	13	3R					
2000-01	Flexsys Cefn Druids	League of Wales	34	11	5	18	60	70	38	13	2R					
2001-02	Flexsys Cefn Druids	League of Wales	34	8	8	18	49	79	32	14	SF					
2002-03	Flexsys Cefn Druids	Welsh Premier League	34	11	5	18	37	51	38	12	4R					
2003-04	NEWI Cefn Druids	Welsh Premier League	32	11	2	19	44	59	35	13	QF					
2004-05	NEWI Cefn Druids	Welsh Premier League	34	5	7	22	29	72	22	17	2R		1R			
2005-06	NEWI Cefn Druids	Welsh Premier League	34	7	11	16	42	58	32	14	4R		PR			
2006-07	NEWI Cefn Druids	Welsh Premier League	32	7	6	19	39	65	27	14	2R		Group Stage			
2007-08	NEWI Cefn Druids	Welsh Premier League	34	12	2	20	45	66	38	12	QF		Group Stage			FAW Premier Cup round 2
2008-09	NEWI Cefn Druids	Welsh Premier League	34	9	7	18	57	74	34	13	4R		QF			
2009-10	Elements Cefn Druids	Welsh Premier League	34	1	6	27	16	77	9	18	2R					
2010-11	Cefn Druids	Cymru Alliance	30	18	6	6	60	29	60	3	4R					
2011-12	Cefn Druids	Cymru Alliance	30	17	3	10	58	42	54	6	Runner Up					NEWFA Cup Winners
2012-13	Cefn Druids	Cymru Alliance	30	22	3	5	79	32	69	2	3R				1QR	
2013-14	Cefn Druids	Cymru Alliance	30	22	7	1	90	20	73	1	4R		1R			NEWFA Cup Winners
2014-15	Cefn Druids	Welsh Premier League	32	7	6	19	38	64	27	11	3R		2R			
2015-16	Cefn Druids	Cymru Alliance	30	21	3	6	62	33	66	2	4R		1R			NEWFA Cup Winners
2016-17	Cefn Druids	Welsh Premier League	32	9	12	11	40	48	39	8	4R		2R			
2017-18	Cefn Druids	Welsh Premier League	32	12	8	12	38	41	44	5			1R			
2018-19	Cefn Druids	Welsh Premier League	32	10	9	13	43	49	39	10			1R		PR	
