= John Price Davies =

Welsh footballer (1862–1955)

John Davies
Personal information
- Full name: John Price Davies
- Date of birth: 1862
- Place of birth: Ruabon, Wales
- Date of death: 31 March 1955
- Place of death: Wrexham, Wales
- Positions: Forward; half back

Senior career*
Years	Team	Apps	(Gls)
1878–1879	Corwen		
1879–1881	Berwyn Rangers		
1881–1884	Druids		
1884–1886	Wrexham Olympic		
1886–1887	Wrexham Cambrian		
1887–1889	Vale of Llangollen		
1889–1890	Wynnstay		
1890–1892	Ruabon		

International career
1883	Wales	2	(0)
- * Club domestic league appearances and goals

John Price Davies (1862 – 31 March 1955) was a Welsh footballer who played as either a forward or half back for various clubs, including Druids and Berwyn Rangers in the 1870s and 1880s. He also made two appearances for Wales in 1883.

== Football career ==
Davies was born in Ruabon, but started his football career at Corwen in 1878. The following year he joined Berwyn Rangers of Llangollen, where he played for two years before moving to Druids in 1881. In 1882, he was a member of the Druids team which won the Welsh Cup with a 5–0 victory over Northwich Victoria (two goals each from Charles Ketley and Edward Bowen).

In 1882–83, Druids had their best run in the FA Cup. After victories over Oswestry Town and Northwich Victoria in the first two rounds, they were drawn against Bolton Wanderers. After two draws, the clubs met for a second replay at Wrexham's Racecourse Ground on 29 January 1883; a single goal from Jack Vaughan was sufficient to see the Druids through. They then defeated another Bolton-based club, Eagley, before being defeated 4–1 on 24 February 1883 at Blackburn Olympic, who went on to win the trophy a month later.

His international debut came on 3 February 1883, when he was one of four Druids players selected to play (as a forward) against England at the Kennington Oval, London. The England selectors had chosen an "attacking side" in an attempt to avenge defeats by Wales in the two previous meetings, resulting in a comfortable 5–0 victory for the English, with Clement Mitchell scoring a hat-trick. Davies' second cap came as a half back on 17 March in a 1–1 draw with Ireland. His international appearances were summed up by the Football Association of Wales as "useful but not very ornamental".

In September 1883, he was a guest player for Wrexham when they staged the first match under floodlights in North Wales (against Oswestry) at their Grosvenor Road ground. He left the Druids in 1884 and over the next eight years he made appearances for five clubs. He was also the first secretary of the Vale of Llangollen side in 1887.

== Family ==
He was brother-in-law to fellow Welsh international, Bob Roberts.

== Honours ==
Druids

- Welsh Cup winners: 1882
