= Cefn Druids A.F.C. =

Football club in Wales

Cefn Druids AFC
- Full name: Cefn Druids Association Football Club
- Nicknames: The Ancients, Druids
- Founded: 1872; 154 years ago
- Ground: The Rock, Rhosymedre, Wrexham
- Capacity: 3,000 (500 seated)
- Chairman: Des Williams
- Manager: Ryan Roberts
- League: North East Wales Division Two
- 2025–26: North East Wales Division Two, 8th of 8
- Website: https://www.cefndruidsafc.com/
| Home colours | Away colours |

Cefn Druids Association Football Club (Welsh: Clwb Pêl-droed Derwyddon Cefn) is a football team based in the village of Cefn Mawr, Wrexham.

The club was founded in 1872 by Llewelyn Kenrick who would later go on to found the Football Association of Wales. Following several mergers through the club's history, in 1992 it became Cefn Druids AFC with the amalgamation of Cefn Albion F.C. and Druids United. The club is one of the oldest and most successful in Wales, winning the Welsh Cup 8 times and competing in 14 finals, most recently in 2012. The club has seen a resurgence in recent times with a successful run in the top flight, securing their best ever league finish and winning the European Play-Off, taking them into the Europa League for the second time.

In 2021–22, the club played in the Cymru North after being relegated from the Cymru Premier but withdrew ahead of the 2023–24 season due to the management and playing staff leaving over unpaid wages and a transfer ban by FIFA. The club reformed in the 2024–25 season to play in the North East Wales Football League Championship Division. They currently play in the North East Wales Division Two.

The team's first choice strip is black and white striped shirts, black shorts and black socks. The second choice strip is red shirts, red shorts and red socks for the 2019–20 season. The club's official kit is produced by Italian kit giant Errea with sponsorship by Wrexham Lager and Johnstown Tyre Service.

== Stadium ==
Planning permission for a 3,500 capacity stadium at the Rock, Rhosymedre, was given in March 2009, subject to approval from the Welsh Assembly and Health and Safety Executive. Delays to the beginning of construction put the project back by 12 months and the club moved into the new stadium in August 2010. The club has previously played at Plas Kynaston Lane in Cefn Mawr.

== History ==
For a full history see; List of football seasons involving Cefn Druids and its predecessor clubs

The team take their prolific history from the famous old Welsh team Druids FC who were founded in the early 1870s. They had won the Welsh Cup on no less than 8 occasions and have finished runners-up five times but fell on hard times with the advent of professional football. Druids were ancient mystic men throughout Celtic civilisation and were closely associated with Wales.

=== Club formation ===
It is claimed by the later club that Druids FC formed in 1872 when Plasmadoc FC merged with Ruabon Rovers and Ruabon Volunteers under the guidance of Llewelyn Kenrick. Contemporary sources refute this version of events.

It was reported that on 6 October 1872, the opening game of a Football Club for the district was played at Plasmadoc Park. Mr George Hampden Whalley was selected as the captain of the club. On 23 October 1872 a meeting was held by Ruabon Rovers at the Wynnstay Arms where the Club committee was selected. It included people like David Thomson and Dr Daniel Grey. George Hampden Whalley was elected as president. Whalley would later also hold this position when the club became Druids and at rival club Ruabon FC.

In February 1873 Ruabon Rovers played a fixture against Ruabon Volunteers, which shows these clubs were both still Active after the merger date proposed by the modern day club. Ruabon Volunteers were also known as the 2nd Denbighshire Volunteers so were actually a Military team.

In September 1873 the club was still known as Ruabon Rovers as evidenced in the annual meeting of the club, where a number of influential people, later associated with Druids were present and held key roles, such as David and George Thomson. The issue of the club's foundation is further muddied when Llewelyn Kenrick was present at the founding of a football club in Ruabon in September 1873.

The name of the club appears interchangeable between Ruabon Rovers and Plasmadoc in 1873, and the club was often referred to as the Plasmadoc Club from 1874 up until 1876. When speaking in 1882, Llewelyn Kenrick stated that the club had been started by David Thomson in 1874 as the Plasmadoc Club.

=== Druids FC ===
The name Druids does not appear in the local press until January 1876. By 1877 the club were commonly referred to as Druids Football Club.

The club were allowed to play at Plasmadoc Park by George Hammond Whalley MP. However following his death in 1878 Druids lost the use of the Plasmadoc Ground. Because of this, Druids were forced to withdraw form the 1878–79 edition of the Welsh Cup. This resulted in the Club folding and many players, including Kenrick, leaving the club. The club did not play any further games for over a year until it was revived in November 1879.

Salvation was found in the form of the Williams-Wynn family as they allowed the club to use an area of the Wynnstay Estate, which became Wynnstay Park and home to the Druids for the next forty years.

With their new home Druids once again entered the Welsh Cup and the 1879–80 edition saw the start of an era of success for the Ruabon Club. Druids reached the Welsh Cup final seven consecutive times between 1879 and 1886 winning the trophy five times. Druids also had some success in the FA Cup reaching the Fifth Round (last eight) in 1882–83 and the Fourth Round in 1884–85

After seven years of success in Welsh football Druids would begin to suffer with the advent of professionalism. Druids failed to reach further than the Second Round in the Welsh Cup until the 1892–93 season. The earlier success in the FA Cup was also not to be matched as after 1887–88 they did not progress to the First Round proper again.

=== Mergers ===
In September 1888 at a meeting at the Wynnstay Arms, the club was reformed when they merged with neighbours Ruabon Wanderers. It was decided to retain the name Druids as it was a well known title. A follow-up meeting was held at the Bricklayers Arms, Ruabon where the committee was selected. Llewelyn Kenrick was present at this meeting.

After World War I, Druids FC ceased to exist when they merged with Rhosymedre to form Rhosymedre Druids. Despite this new pairing, Druids still faced financial trouble and amalgamated once more in August 1927 with Acrefair United F.C. to form a new club Druids United.

In 1992 after many years of discussion the inevitable amalgamation of Druids United and Cefn Albion F.C. took place to end the internal village soccer rivalry in the village of Cefn Mawr. The new look club took the bold step of applying to join the new Cymru Alliance. The joint resources of the clubs could be focused on a revival of football fortunes in the village of Cefn Mawr.

=== Oldest club ===
Contrary to the club badge and sign above the club house proclaiming the club to be the oldest in Wales, these claims are erroneous.

The now defunct Oswestry Town claim a formation date of 1860 which predates Druids, although again primary sources refute this and 1875 is more likely. Geographically they were located in England, though the team has participated in the Welsh system and were early members of the Welsh FA, and would thus consider themselves a Welsh side (see the New Saints).

When the National Library of Wales digitised its Newspaper Archive in 2012, new evidence was discovered that proved Wrexham AFC were formed in 1864 which pre-dates the formation of the original Druids FC (via Ruabon Rovers and Plasmadoc) by 8 years, thus making Cefn Druids claims of being the oldest club in Wales erroneous.

Cefn Druids can claim to originate from one of the oldest existing teams located in Wales, thus making it also one of the oldest football clubs in the world outside England via descent. This could be reflected in club's nickname, 'The Ancients', however Druids FC were referred to as 'The Ancient Britons' in multiple historical sources as far back as 1893, so the nickname is actually derived from Celtic history rather than the age of the club.

Druids can still claim via descent to be the oldest club playing in the Welsh Pyramid.

| Season | Pos. | League |
|---|---|---|
| 1992–93 | 7 | Cymru Alliance |
| 1993–94 | 8 | Cymru Alliance |
| 1994–95 | 5 | Cymru Alliance |
| 1995–96 | 8 | Cymru Alliance |
| 1996–97 | 5 | Cymru Alliance |
| 1997–98 | 3 | Cymru Alliance |
| 1998–99 | 1 | Cymru Alliance |
| 1999–00 | 13 | League of Wales |
| 2000–01 | 13 | League of Wales |
| 2001–02 | 14 | League of Wales |
| 2002–03 | 12 | Welsh Premier League |
| 2003–04 | 13 | Welsh Premier League |
| 2004–05 | 17 | Welsh Premier League |
| 2005–06 | 14 | Welsh Premier League |
| 2006–07 | 14 | Welsh Premier League |
| 2007–08 | 12 | Welsh Premier League |
| 2008–09 | 13 | Welsh Premier League |
| 2009–10 | 18 | Welsh Premier League |
| 2010–11 | 3 | Cymru Alliance |
| 2011–12 | 6 | Cymru Alliance |
| 2012–13 | 2 | Cymru Alliance |
| 2013–14 | 1 | Cymru Alliance |
| 2014–15 | 11 | Welsh Premier League |
| 2015–16 | 2 | Cymru Alliance |
| 2016–17 | 8 | Welsh Premier League |
| 2017–18 | 5 | Welsh Premier League |
| 2018–19 | 10 | Welsh Premier League |
| 2019–20 | - | Welsh Premier League |

=== Flexsys Cefn Druids ===
The club steadily consolidated in the Cymru Alliance, helped by a renewed youth policy, and under Gareth Powell, recruited from Lex XI and former manager of Brymbo FC, strolled to the 1998/99 Cymru Alliance championship, scoring over 100 goals. They were promoted into the League of Wales. Eventually Druids finished the season 13th with 41 points from 34 games and this was definitely a successful campaign as they easily avoided the drop back down to the Cymru Alliance.

Druids embarked upon season 2000–01 with a lot of confidence. However, on the evening of 23 May 2001 Gareth Powell phoned his players telling them of his decision to resign as manager and to make a clean break from football. After the appointment of ex-Rochdale midfielder Steve O'Shaughnessy in the summer of 2001, the Ancients experienced their best results since the halcyon Welsh Cup days of the late 19th century and early 20th century.

The 2001–02 season was a season of consolidation in the Cymru Premier finishing in 14th place. However, in the Welsh Cup after victories over Llangefni-Glantraeth, Ruthin Town, Halkyn United and Welshpool Town, Cefn found themselves in the semi-finals of the Welsh Cup for the first time in 98 years. It was not to be, as a Marc Lloyd-Williams inspired Bangor City won 5–0 at Belle Vue, Rhyl on 6 April 2002.

The 2002–03 season was a financially difficult one with the playing and management staff going weeks without payment at one point in the season. This even forced O'Shaughnessy to resign out of principle during this time. Fortunately, he returned after reassurances were given. On the pitch, Cefn finished in a highly respectable 12th place.

=== NEWI Cefn Druids ===
Before the start of the 2003–04 season, Cefn Druids announced that they had reached an arrangement with the Wrexham-based college, NEWI. The arrangement between college and club gave NEWI students footballing opportunities whilst carrying on with their studies and increasing the resources available to the club.

The 2003–04 season, saw an array of young players join the club like Gareth Evans, who eventually left to join Football League Two club Wrexham. The average age of the team for one match against Caersws on 12 December 2003 was just 21.

As the 2003–04 season came to a conclusion with players and management looking ahead to the future with excitement with a young squad at their disposal. The club signed a three-year deal with NEWI in 2004 after the previous 12-month arrangement proved a success.

However, on the evening of 18 April 2004, O'Shaughnessy was sacked by the club's board. Since then the club has been severely struggling on the pitch with the squad that O'Shaughnessy put together leaving en masse. Amongst the players who left were Aden Shannon, Brett Jefferies, Dave Cunnah and First Team Coach, Jimmy Hunter all to Welshpool Town, who have qualified for the FAW Premier Cup in the last two seasons.

The Ancients should have been relegated from the Cymru Premier in April 2005 after finishing in the bottom two, but were given a last minute reprieve by Cymru Alliance winners Buckley Town, who declined promotion.

Under the stewardship of former Wrexham manager, Dixie McNeil, the Ancients recorded slightly more respectable league positions for the following 2 seasons, namely 14th in 2005–06 and 13th in 2006–07. However, partly due to his media work as a pundit for BBC Wales, McNeil stepped down during this pre season.

The club were quick to appoint a new management duo of former Wrexham teammates, Wayne Phillips and Lee Jones. Both continued to play, with Phillips benefiting from previous managerial experience at Caernarfon Town. The partnership got off to the best possible start with a shock 1–0 opening day home win against Champions Total Network Solutions.

Phillips and Jones kept the club in the Cymru Premier by finishing 12th and 13th in seasons 2007–08 and 2008–09 respectively.

=== Rebranding ===
However, with delays to the construction of the new stadium and the overhaul of the Welsh Premier League the 2009–10 season, a reduced playing budget saw the club field a mainly young squad for the entire season and finished bottom of the table and be relegated to the Cymru Alliance. In addition Phillips and Jones departed the club with former player and Welshpool Town manager Huw Griffiths appointed as the new manager. The club went on to finish 3rd place in their first season back in the 2nd tier of Welsh football since 1998–99, Andrew Swarbrick being the club's top scorer of the season getting an impressive 18 in all competitions.

Cefn Druids now have a Ladies team, formed in summer 2011. The Ladies will be playing in the North Wales Women's Football League along with teams such as Wrexham Ladies, Caenarfon and Llandudno Junction, for the first time in 2011–12.

Cefn Druids reached the semi-finals of the Welsh Cup during the 2011–12 season. They claimed big scalps on the way to the semis by defeating teams away from home such as Connahs Quay Nomads and Cymru Premier teams Prestatyn Town and Aberystwyth Town. On 31 March 2012 Cefn Druids defeated Airbus at Rhyl's Belle Vue 4–1 to reach their first Welsh cup final in 108 years. Andrew Swarbrick got a hat trick and Tony Cann netted once to complete the rout. Druids were defeated 2–0 by the New Saints in the final, but qualified for the UEFA Europa League as a result. The club were dealt a shock, with the departure of Manager Huw Griffiths, due to the club and management being unable to agree a budget for the up-and-coming season. John Keegan then took over as manager, before departing later that season. In May 2015, Huw Griffiths returned to the club following an absence of 12 months.

The 2017–18 season saw Cefn achieve their highest ever top flight finish as they ended the season in fifth place.

== Club honours ==
=== Druids (1872–1927)/ Druids United (1927–1992)/ Cefn Druids A.F.C. (1992–present) ===
==== League ====
- Wrexham & District Amateur League
  - Champions: 1931–32, 1933–34, 1936–37
  - Runners-up: 1934–35
- Welsh National League (Wrexham Area) Division One
  - Champions: 1950–51
  - Runners-up: 1952–53, 1956–57, 1958–59, 1959–60
- Welsh National League (Wrexham Area) Division Two
  - Champions: 1969–70
- Cymru Alliance
  - Champions: 1998–99, 2013–14

==== Cups ====
- FAW Welsh Cup
  - Winners: 1880, 1881, 1882, 1885, 1886, 1898, 1899, 1904
  - Finalists: 1878, 1883, 1884, 1900, 1901, 2012
- Welsh Amateur Cup
  - Winners: 1903
  - Finalists: 1904, 1957
- Welsh Youth Cup
  - Winners: 1958, 1959
- North East Wales FA Challenge Cup
  - Winners: 1992–93, 1998–99, 2011–12, 2013–14, 2015–16, 2018–19
- NEWFA Two Counties Cup
  - Finalists: 2025–26
- Welsh National League Division 2 Cup
  - Finalists: 1988
- North East Wales Presidents Cup
  - Winners: 1998–99
- WPL Europa League Play-off Final
  - Winners: 2017–18

=== Cefn Albion (1967–1992) ===
==== League ====
- Welsh National League (Wrexham Area) Premier Division
  - Runners-up: 1984–85
- Welsh National League (Wrexham Area) Division 1
  - Champions: 1979–80, 1980–81
  - Runners-up: 1978–79
- Welsh National League (Wrexham Area) Division 3B
  - Champions: 1969–70

==== Cup ====
- North East Wales FA Challenge Cup
  - Winners: 1978
  - Finalists: 1976, 1989
- North East Wales FA Horace Wynn Cup
  - Winners: 1977
- Welsh National League Division 1 Cup
  - Finalists: 1984, 1991
- Welsh National League Division 2 Cup
  - Winners: 1974
  - Finalists: 1971
- Welsh National League Division 3 Cup
  - Finalists: 1969, 1984

== European record ==
| Season | Competition | Round | Opponent | Home | Away | Aggregate |
|---|---|---|---|---|---|---|
| 2012–13 | UEFA Europa League | First qualifying round | (Finland) MYPA | 0–0 | 0–5 | 0–5 |
| 2018–19 | UEFA Europa League | Preliminary round | (Lithuania) Trakai | 1–1 | 0–1 | 1–2 |
