= Rhos F.C. =

Rhos F.C. could refer to the following:

- Rhosllanerchrugog F.C. (1889), association football club from Rhosllanerchrugog, formed in 1889, and usually referred to as Rhos
- Rhos F.C. (1911), association football club from Rhosllanerchrugog formed in 1911
- Rhos Athletic F.C., association football club from Rhosllanerchrugog formed in 1906 and known as Rhos in the 1920s
