= List of Chirk AAA FC seasons =

This is a list of seasons played by Chirk AAA FC from the 1877–78 season, when the club began playing in competitive fixtures following the founding of the Welsh Cup, to the most recent current season.

The club was formed in 1876 and is one of the oldest clubs in Wales. The club is a founder member of the Football Association of Wales and remains a member to the present day. Chirk are nicknamed the Colliers, as their early teams were composed of miners from the two local collieries.

== Seasons ==
Season	League									Welsh Cup	FA Cup	Welsh Amateur Cup	Other
Season	Division	P	W	D	L	F	A	Pts	Pos	Welsh Cup	FA Cup	Welsh Amateur Cup	Other
1877-78										1R			
1878-79										3R			
1879-80													
1880-81										2R			
1881-82										2R			
1882-83										1R			
1883-84										1R			
1884-85										3R	3R		
1885-86										1R			
1886-87										Winners	5R		
1887-88										Winners	5R		
1888-89										Semi Final	3QR		
1889-90										Winners			
1890-91										Semi Final		Semi Final	
1891-92	The Combination	22	7	5	10	48	56	19	7	Winners		Semi Final	
1892-93	The Combination	22	10	3	9	63	43	23	4	Runner Up			
1893-94	Welsh Senior League	12	3	1	8	15	31	7	9	Winners			FA Amateur Cup Quarter Final
1894-95	Welsh Senior League	13	6	4	3	38	22	16	4	Semi Final			
1895-96	Welsh Senior League	12	5	2	5	42	23	12	4	4R			
1896-97	Welsh Senior League	14	8	0	6	28	20	14*	4	1R			
1897-98	The Combination								3	2R			
1898-99	The Combination								8	Semi Final			
1899-1900	The Combination								1	3R			
1900-01	The Combination								5	Semi Final			
1901-02	The Combination								13	3R			
1902-03	The Combination								14	3R			
1903-03	The Combination								13	4R			
1904-05	The Combination								14	3R			
1905-06	The Combination								12	5R	4QR		
1906-07	The Combination								11	3R			
1907-08	The Combination								10	3R			
1908-09	The Combination								12	2R			
1909-10	The Combination								13	3R			
1910-11	Liverpool County Combination Division 1	24	3	5	16	31	87	11	13	3R			
1911-12										1R			
1912-13	North Wales Alliance League	26	11	7	8	57	43	29	8	2R			
1913-14	North Wales Alliance League	20	14	1	5	60	25	29	2	2PR			
1914-15										Withdrew			
1915-1919	No Football played due to World War I												
1919-20	North Wales Alliance League	26	13	6	7	71	35	32	6	PR		3R	
1920-21	North Wales Alliance League	26	11	5	10	50	35	27	7	1R			
1921-22	Welsh National League Division 1 North	26	12	5	9	54	49	29	5	3PR			
1922-23	Welsh National League Division 1 North	28	7	4	17	37	69	18	14	5R			
1923-24	Welsh National League Division 1 North	34	17	4	13	81	55	38	6	2R			
1924-25	Welsh National League Division 1 North	30	7	6	17	41	76	20	14	3R			
1925-26	Welsh National League Division 1 North	34	9	3	22	63	121	21	16	3R			
1926-27	Welsh National League Division 1 North	36	8	2	26	49	166	18	18	4R			
1927-28										3R			North Wales Charity Cup Semi Final
1928-29	Club Inactive												
1929-30	Club Inactive												
1930-31													
1931-32	Cefn & District League	16	12	3	1	67	20	27	1				
1932-33	Cefn & District League	22	20	1	1	116	22	41	1				
1933-34	Cefn & District League	22	11	3	5	74	30	25	5				
1934-35	Cefn & District League	18	11	2	5	75	28	28	4				
1935-36	Cefn & District League	14	9	1	4	44	30	19	9				
1936-37	Wrexham & District League	22	3	3	16	46	96	9	14				
1937-38	Wrexham & District League	23	8	3	12	59	63	19	8				
1938-39	Wrexham & District League	14	4	2	8	25	33	10	6				
1939-1945	No Football played due to World War II												
1945-46	Welsh National League (Wrexham Area) Senior Division	22	9	5	8	64	40	23	6				
1946-47	Welsh National League (Wrexham Area) Senior Division	22	13	5	4	56	33	31	3				
1947-48	Welsh National League (Wrexham Area) Senior Division	22	15	3	4	97	35	33	1				
1948-49	Welsh National League (Wrexham Area) Senior Division	28	17	7	4	79	36	41	3				
1949-50	Welsh National League (Wrexham Area) Division One	32	25	3	4	122	54	53	1				
1950-51	Welsh National League (Wrexham Area) Division One	30	12	6	12	78	76	30	7				
1951-52	Welsh National League (Wrexham Area) Division One	30	21	5	4	93	45	47	1			Runner Up	
1952-53	Welsh National League (Wrexham Area) Division One												
1953-54	Welsh National League (Wrexham Area) Division One												
1954-55	Welsh National League (Wrexham Area) Division One											Runner Up	
1955-56	Welsh National League (Wrexham Area) Division One												
1956-57	Welsh National League (Wrexham Area) Division One												
1957-58	Welsh National League (Wrexham Area) Division One												
1958-59	Welsh National League (Wrexham Area) Division One											Winners	
1959-60	Welsh National League (Wrexham Area) Division One											Winners	
1960-61	Welsh National League (Wrexham Area) Division One												
1961-62	Welsh National League (Wrexham Area) Division One												
1962-63	Welsh National League (Wrexham Area) Division One											Winners	
1988-89	Welsh National League (Wrexham Area) Premier Division	30	21	4	5	79	34	67	3				Welsh National League Premier Division League Cup Winners
1989-90	Welsh National League (Wrexham Area) Premier Division	30	11	7	12	42	56	37*	9				
1990-91	Welsh National League (Wrexham Area) Premier Division	26	17	6	3	53	17	57	2				Welsh National League Premier Division League Cup Winners
1991-92	Welsh National League (Wrexham Area) Premier Division	26	14	5	7	46	28	47	5				
1992-93	Welsh National League (Wrexham Area) Premier Division	26	11	6	9	51	41	39	7				
1993-94	Welsh National League (Wrexham Area) Premier Division	26	14	6	6	59	40	48	4				
1994-95	Welsh National League (Wrexham Area) Premier Division	26	10	2	14	50	49	23	12				
1995-96	Welsh National League (Wrexham Area) Premier Division	26	18	3	5	69	21	57	3				
1996-97	Welsh National League (Wrexham Area) Premier Division	26	19	4	3	71	22	61	2				
1997-98	Cymru Alliance	36	10	4	22	46	74	34	17				
1998-99	Welsh National League (Wrexham Area) Premier Division	28							4				Welsh National League Premier Division League Cup Winners
1999-2000	Welsh National League (Wrexham Area) Premier Division	30							5				
2000-01	Welsh National League (Wrexham Area) Premier Division	30							11				
2001-02	Welsh National League (Wrexham Area) Premier Division	28							8				
2002-03	Welsh National League (Wrexham Area) Premier Division	30							11				
2003-04	Welsh National League (Wrexham Area) Premier Division	26							6				Welsh National League Premier Division League Cup Winners
2004-05	Welsh National League (Wrexham Area) Premier Division	30							9				
2005-06	Welsh National League (Wrexham Area) Premier Division	32							3				
2006-07	Welsh National League (Wrexham Area) Premier Division	30							6				
2007-08	Welsh National League (Wrexham Area) Premier Division	30							11				
2008-09	Welsh National League (Wrexham Area) Premier Division	28							9				
2009-10	Welsh National League (Wrexham Area) Premier Division	26	18	4	4	74	38	58	2				
2010-11	Welsh National League (Wrexham Area) Premier Division	30	18	4	8	60	48	58	4				
2011-12	Welsh National League (Wrexham Area) Premier Division	30	21	2	7	94	45	65	3				
2012-13	Welsh National League (Wrexham Area) Premier Division	28	18	7	3	84	38	61	1				
2013-14	Welsh National League (Wrexham Area) Premier Division	30	15	8	7	69	47	53	6			Runner Up	
2014-15	Welsh National League (Wrexham Area) Premier Division	30	21	6	3	98	34	69	2				
2015-16	Welsh National League (Wrexham Area) Premier Division	26	15	6	5	77	30	51	4				
2016-17	Welsh National League (Wrexham Area) Premier Division	26	16	4	6	67	40	52	5			Winners	
2017-18	Welsh National League (Wrexham Area) Premier Division	28	11	5	12	50	42	38	9				
2018-19	Welsh National League (Wrexham Area) Premier Division	28	10	9	9	51	39	39	8				
2019-20	Welsh National League (Wrexham Area) Premier Division												

== Key ==
Champions	Runners-up	Promoted	Relegated	* = Points Deduction
