= Knyvett Crosse =

Welsh footballer

Personal information
- Date of birth: 1855
- Place of birth: Shropshire, England
- Date of death: 1916 (aged 60–61)
- Place of death: Lancashire, England
- Position: Centre forward

Senior career*
Years	Team	Apps	(Gls)
–1878	Ruabon		
1878–1885	Druids		

International career
1879–1881	Wales	3	(1)
- * Club domestic league appearances and goals

Knyvett Crosse (1855–1916) was a Welsh international footballer. He was part of the Wales national football team between 1879 and 1881, playing 3 matches and scoring 1 goal. He played his first match on 7 April 1879 against Scotland and his last match on 14 March 1881 against Scotland.

== Football career ==
Crosse played for Ruabon in 1878.

He played as a centre forward for Druids for 6 years and won the Welsh Cup three times.

== Later career ==
After football he became the proprietor of the Star Hotel, High Street, Bangor.

Whilst living in Bangor he was the captain of Bangor Cricket Club.

== See also ==
- List of Wales international footballers (alphabetical)
