= Edward Roberts (footballer) =

Welsh footballer

Personal information
- Full name: Edward Daniel Roberts
- Date of birth: 20 February 1891
- Place of birth: Rhosllanerchrugog, Wales
- Date of death: 28 December 1970
- Position: Half back

Senior career*
Years	Team	Apps	(Gls)
1912–1913	Chirk AAA		
1913–1914	Druids		
1914	Rhos Athletic		
1920	Bristol City	0	(0)
1920–1923	Wrexham	106	(8)
1923-1924	Rhos Athletic		
1924	Druids		
- * Club domestic league appearances and goals

Edward Daniel Roberts (born 20 February 1891) was a Welsh professional footballer who played as a half-back. He made appearances in the English Football League for Wrexham, appearing in their inaugural Football League fixture in 1921 against Hartlepools United.
