= ARCA races at Talladega =

ARCA Menards Series race at Talladega

Alabama Manufactured Housing 200

ARCA Menards Series
- Venue: Talladega Superspeedway
- Location: Lincoln, Alabama, United States
- Corporate sponsor: Alabama Manufactured Housing
- First race: 1969
- Distance: 202.16 miles (325.3 km)
- Laps: 76
- Previous names: Talladega ARCA 200 (1982); Talladega ARCA 500 (1983); Permatex 500 (1984-1985); Talladega ARCA 500K (1986, 1988); ARCA Permatex 500K (1987); Bumper-To-Bumper 500K (1989); Poulan Pro 500K (1990-1993); Food World 500K (1994-1995); Mountain Dew 500K (1996); ARCA RE/MAX 250 (2009); Talladega ARCA 250 (2010); 3 Amigos 250 (2011); International Motorsports Hall Of Fame 250 (2012-2013); International Motorsports Hall Of Fame 200 (2014-2015); General Tire 200 (2016-2019, 2021-2025) Summer race: Talladega ARCA 200 (1982-1984) Permatex 500K (1986, 1988) Talladega ARCA 500K (1987-1991) General Tire 200 At Talladega (2020); Fall race: Talladega ARCA 200 (1979-1981) Winn Dixie 500K (1997) Winn Dixie 300 (1998-2000) Food World 300 (2001-2006) ARCA RE/MAX 250 (2007-2008)

Circuit information
- Surface: Asphalt
- Length: 2.66 mi (4.28 km)
- Turns: 4

The Alabama Manufactured Housing 200 is an ARCA Menards Series race held at Talladega Superspeedway in Lincoln, Alabama. Since 2009, it has been held in the spring on the same weekend as the NASCAR Cup Series' Jack Link's 500 and NASCAR O'Reilly Auto Parts Series' Ag-Pro 300.

== History ==
It was previously held during the track's fall Cup Series weekend.

Footage from the 2006 race was shown in the 2008 U.S. remake of Funny Games. The race was also Juan Pablo Montoya's first race in a stock car (he finished 3rd in the race.)

The 2018 race currently has the closest margin of victory in ARCA Series history. The official margin of victory was 0.0029 seconds when Zane Smith won the race over Joe Graf Jr..

== Past winners ==
Year	Date	Driver	Manufacturer	Race distance		Race time	Average speed (mph)
Year	Date	Driver	Manufacturer	Laps	Miles (km)	Race time	Average speed (mph)
1969	October 26	Jim Vandiver	Dodge	188	500.08 (804.8)	3:12:19	156.017
1970	April 11	Ramo Stott	Plymouth	50	133 (214.043)	0:51:30	154.391
1970	June 14	Ramo Stott	Plymouth	188	500.08 (804.8)	3:23:25	147.504
1975	May 3	Jim Vandiver	Dodge	76	202.16 (325.344)	1:20:04	151.494
1976	May 1	Johnny Halford	Dodge	76	202.16 (325.344)	1:20:05	151.462
1977	August 6	Ron Hutcherson	Chevrolet	76	202.16 (325.344)	1:20:37	150.46
1978	August 5	Bruce Hill	Chevrolet	76	202.16 (325.344)	1:17:44	156.041
1979	August 4	Sandy Satullo, II	Buick	76	202.16 (325.344)	1:25:21	142.113
1980	August 2	Billie Harvey	Chevrolet	76	202.16 (325.344)	1:31:04	132.15
1981	August 1	Mark Martin	Chevrolet	76	202.16 (325.344)	1:25:35	141.728
1982	May 1	Jim Vaughan	Ford	76	202.16 (325.344)	1:36:30	125.4
1982	July 31	Rick Roland	Pontiac	76	202.16 (325.344)	1:27:20	138.571
1983	April 30	Davey Allison	Pontiac	117	311.22 (500.86)	2:06:16	147.887
1983	July 30	Davey Allison	Pontiac	76	202.16 (325.344)	1:25:07	142.5
1984	May 5	Davey Allison	Pontiac	117	311.22 (500.86)	2:14:06	139.248
1984	July 28	Red Farmer	Chevrolet	76	202.16 (325.344)	1:15:10	161.369
1985	May 4	Davey Allison	Buick	117	311.22 (500.86)	2:08:20	145.505
1985	July 27	No race was held because of rain.					
1986	May 3	Grant Adcox	Chevrolet	117	311.22 (500.86)	2:11:26	142.073
1986	July 26	Grant Adcox	Chevrolet	117	311.22 (500.86)	1:47:21	173.947
1987	May 2	Grant Adcox	Chevrolet	117	311.22 (500.86)	2:43:47	114.011
1987	July 25	Grant Adcox	Oldsmobile	117	311.22 (500.86)	2:19:01	134.323
1988	April 30	Red Farmer	Chevrolet	117	311.22 (500.86)	2:13:07	140.277
1988	July 30	Grant Adcox	Chevrolet	117	311.22 (500.86)	2:10:52	142.688
1989	May 6	Tracy Leslie	Pontiac	117	311.22 (500.86)	2:08:46	145.016
1989	July 29	Tracy Leslie	Pontiac	117	311.22 (500.86)	2:00:54	154.452
1990	May 5	Jimmy Horton	Pontiac	117	311.22 (500.86)	1:59:26	155.913
1990	July 28	Charlie Glotzbach	Chevrolet	117	311.22 (500.86)	1:58:08	158.068
1991	May 4	Jimmy Horton	Pontiac	76*	202.16 (325.344)	1:32:22	131.32
1991	July 27	Charlie Glotzbach	Chevrolet	117	311.22 (500.86)	1:58:16	157.89
1992	May 2	Charlie Glotzbach	Chevrolet	117	311.22 (500.86)	2:08:20	145.505
1993	May 1	Tim Steele	Ford	117	311.22 (500.86)	2:07:46	146.15
1994	April 30	Jeff Purvis	Chevrolet	117	311.22 (500.86)	2:07:56	145.96
1995	April 29	Mike Wallace	Ford	117	311.22 (500.86)	2:05:13	150.327
1996	April 27	Tim Steele	Ford	117	311.22 (500.86)	2:06:37	147.478
1997	October 11	Tim Steele	Ford	117	311.22 (500.86)	2:21:57	131.547
1998	October 10	Tim Steele	Ford	113	300.58 (483.736)	2:30:23	119.925
1999	October 16	Bob Strait	Ford	113	300.58 (483.736)	2:36:52	114.968
2000	October 14	David Keith	Ford	113	300.58 (483.736)	2:31:38	118.923
2001	October 20	Bobby Gerhart	Pontiac	113	300.58 (483.736)	2:04:25	144.955
2002	October 5	Keith Segars	Chevrolet	113	300.58 (483.736)	1:58:43	151.914
2003	September 27	Paul Menard	Chevrolet	113	300.58 (483.736)	2:23:04	126.059
2004	October 2	Blake Feese	Chevrolet	113	300.58 (483.736)	2:38:05	114.084
2005	October 1	Kraig Kinser	Chevrolet	113	300.58 (483.736)	2:09:18	139.48
2006	October 6	Frank Kimmel	Ford	81*	215.46 (346.749)	1:40:04	129.19
2007	October 5	Michael Annett	Toyota	94	250.04 (402.4)	1:57:37	127.553
2008	October 3	Justin Allgaier	Dodge	94	250.04 (402.4)	1:19:16	107.724
2009	April 24	Justin Lofton	Toyota	97*	258.02 (415.242)	1:54:47	134.873
2010	April 23	Dakoda Armstrong	Dodge	94	250.04 (402.4)	1:53:48	131.831
2011	April 16*	Ty Dillon	Chevrolet	94	250.04 (402.4)	1:58:13	126.906
2012	May 4	Brandon McReynolds	Chevrolet	94	250.04 (402.4)	2:11:19	114.246
2013	May 3	Frank Kimmel	Toyota	73*	194.18 (312.502)	1:38:55	117.784
2014	May 3	Tom Hessert III	Dodge	76	202.16 (325.344)	1:15:34	160.515
2015	May 1	Blake Jones	Dodge	79*	210.14 (338.187)	1:40:29	125.478
2016	April 30	Gus Dean	Chevrolet	77*	202.160 (325.344)	1:30:21	135.478
2017	May 6*	Justin Haley	Toyota	82*	218.12 (351.03)	1:37:37	134.067
2018	April 27	Zane Smith	Toyota	87*	231.42 (372.434)	2:00:44	115.007
2019	April 26	Todd Gilliland	Toyota	76	202.16 (325.344)	1:25:46	141.426
2020	June 20	Drew Dollar	Toyota	76	202.16 (325.344)	1:11:22	169.962
2021	April 24	Corey Heim	Toyota	76	202.16 (325.344)	1:37:41	124.173
2022	April 23	Nick Sanchez	Chevrolet	68*	180.88 (291.098)	1:31:23	118.761
2023	April 22	Jesse Love	Toyota	76	202.160 (325.344)	1:29:18	103.807
2024	April 20	Jake Finch	Toyota	76	202.160 (325.344)	1:16.28	158.626
2025	April 26	Lawless Alan	Toyota	77*	202.160 (325.344)	1:40:23	122.420
2026	April 25	Andy Jankowiak	Chevrolet	76	202.160 (325.344)	1:54:2	105.997

=== Notes ===
- 1991 and 2006: The race was shortened due to darkness
- 2009, 2015, 2016, 2017, 2018 and 2025: The race was extended due to a green–white–checker finish
  - 2016: Race ended earlier due to darkness
  - 2018: The race was extended to two attempts of GWC finish
- 2011 and 2017: The race was postponed from Friday to Saturday due to rain
- 2013: The race was shortened due to rain
- 2022: The race was shortened due to time constraints (needing to get the Xfinity Series race on the same day completed before darkness)

Previous race: Tide 150	ARCA Menards Series; Alabama Manufactured Housing 200	Next race: General Tire 100 at The Glen
