= 1876 Scotland v Wales football match =

Association football match

Scotland	Wales
(Scotland)	(Wales)
4	0
- Date: 25 March 1876
- Venue: Hamilton Crescent, Partick
- Referee: Robert Gardner (Scotland)
- Attendance: Over 17,000

The 1876 association football match between the national teams representing Scotland and Wales took place on 25 March 1876 at Hamilton Crescent, Partick, the home ground of the West of Scotland Cricket Club. The match was the first game ever played by the Welsh side. It was also the first time that Scotland had played against a team other than England.

The match was organised by Llewelyn Kenrick, who had founded the Football Association of Wales (FAW) only a few weeks earlier in response to a letter published in The Field. Advertisements were placed in several sporting journals asking for Welsh players, or those with more than three years residence in the country, to come forward and the Welsh team was selected after trial matches were held at the Racecourse Ground in Wrexham. The FAW selected the side and Kenrick was appointed captain for the fixture.

As the more experienced team, Scotland dominated the match and had several chances to score in the first half. They had a goal disallowed after scoring directly from a corner kick, before taking the lead after 40 minutes through John Ferguson. In the early stages of the second half, Wales attempted to play more openly to find a goal, but the Scottish side took advantage of their opponents' inexperience and scored two further goals. The first was a rebound off the goalpost which was converted by Billy MacKinnon; the second was headed in by debutant James Lang. Scotland added a fourth through Henry McNeil and claimed a victory in front of a crowd of over 17,000 people, a record for an international game at the time.

The two nations have met frequently since this first match, playing against each other every year in friendly matches until 1884 when the British Home Championship was introduced. The competition was an annual tournament, and Scotland and Wales played a fixture against each other every year until 1984, apart from when competitive football was suspended during the First and Second World Wars. In total, the two sides have played more than 100 matches against each other since the first meeting.

== Background ==
The first officially recognised international association football match was played between Scotland and England on 30 November 1872. This had been preceded by a series of "unofficial" matches between the two sides in the previous two years, played at The Oval, a cricket ground in South London. As a result, the two sides are recognised as the joint oldest international football teams in history. After the first game, Scotland and England met annually in a series of friendly matches. By the time their fixture against Wales was organised in 1876, Scotland had played England on five occasions in official matches.

Club football was well established in Scotland with the founding of Queen's Park in 1867, although the earliest Scottish club is believed to be the Foot-Ball Club of Edinburgh founded in 1827. The Scottish Football Association (SFA) and the Scottish Cup had been founded in 1873.

In Wales, association football had struggled to gain recognition, rugby union being the preferred sport, especially in the south. Football clubs were establishing in North Wales though – Druids and Wrexham were both founded in 1872. There was no recognised league or cup football until 1877 when the Welsh Cup was introduced and the first league was not founded until the start of the 20th century when the Welsh Football League was created. The clubs would instead have to arrange friendly matches between themselves on an ad hoc basis. It would take several decades before football became established in the south, Cardiff City becoming the first team from the region to win the Welsh Cup in 1912.

== Preparation ==
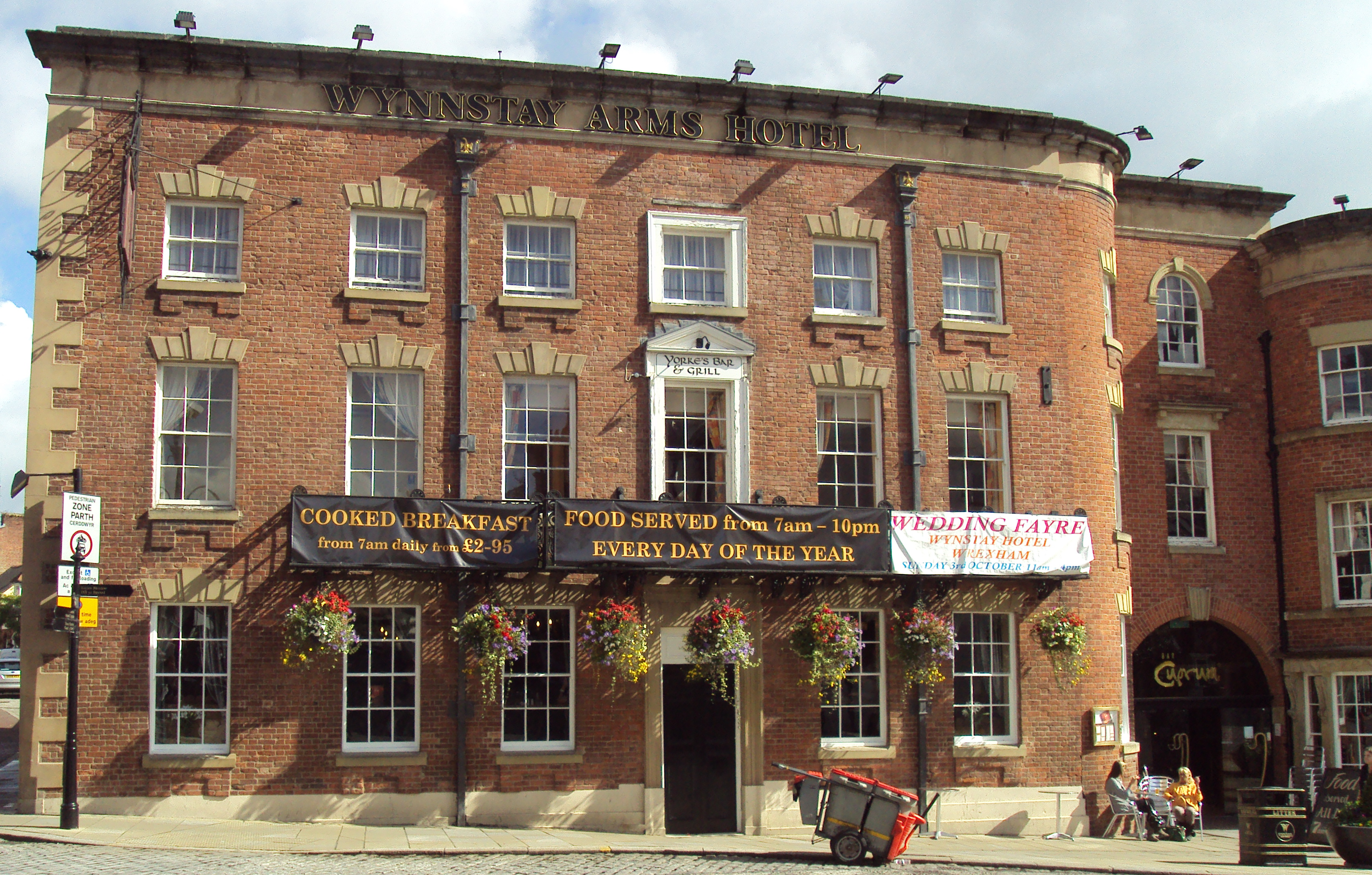
The Wynnstay Arms (pictured in 2010) in Wrexham where the Football Association of Wales was formed shortly before the match.

In January 1876, a London-based Welshman, G. A. Clay-Thomas, placed an advertisement in The Field magazine, a sports and country publication, proposing that a team be formed from Welsh men residing in London to play Scotland or Ireland at rugby. Llewelyn Kenrick of the Druids club saw the advertisement but decided that the international match should be association football and the field of players be drawn from all of Wales. Clay-Thomas' proposed rugby match between residents in London went ahead on 15 March. Kenrick told The Field that the footballers of North Wales accepted the challenge and he advertised for players:

"Test matches will take place at the ground of the Denbighshire County Cricket Club at Wrexham for the purpose of choosing the Cambrian Eleven. Gentlemen desirous of playing are requested to send in their names and addresses."

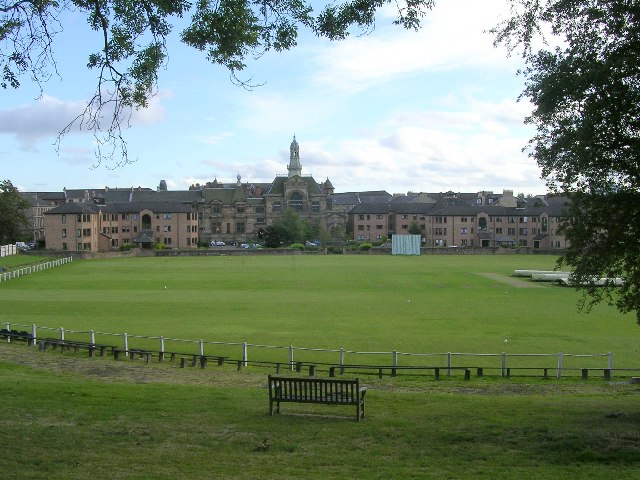
Modern view of Hamilton Crescent, where the match took place in 1876. The Partick Burgh Hall, visible in the background, was built in 1872.

The FAW sent out invitations proposing a football match to officials in England, Scotland and Ireland. England rejected the offer, and Ireland only wished to play under rugby rules. Scotland accepted the invitation, meaning Wales became the first team they had faced in an international fixture other than England. The Football Association of Wales (FAW) was formed in February 1876 at the Wynnstay Arms in Wrexham in preparation for the game and they had hoped for the match to be played in Wales. Scotland rejected this due to scheduling issues but did agree to a second fixture to be played the following year in Wales. Accordingly, the Welsh side travelled to Scotland, where their opposition had yet to lose a match. The venue chosen for the tie was Hamilton Crescent in Partick which was owned by the West of Scotland Cricket Club and had been used for the first official international fixture previously. Concerns by the FAW over financing the team's trip led to an appeal for public donations to raise money.

To qualify for selection, the Welsh players were required to have been born in Wales or taken up residence in the country for at least three years. Although Kenrick corresponded with several Welsh clubs and the nation's universities to raise a team, he was criticised for allegedly overlooking players from the South. One of the main criticisms was the decision to publish most of his notices in English sports journals such as The Field and Bell's Life, which were not widely circulated in Wales. C. C. Chambers, captain of Swansea Rugby Club, wrote a letter to the Western Mail newspaper in which he commented "... there must be some sort of error, and that the team to play Scotland is to be selected from North Wales only. I shall be happy to produce from these parts a team that shall hold their own against any team from North Wales". H. W. Davies, the honorary secretary of the South Wales Football Club also noted that "very few, if any, players (in the south) knew that a match ... had ever been thought of, much less that a date had been fixed". Although Kenrick refused to be drawn into a direct riposte to their letters, he did welcome players of sufficient ability to try out for the team.

Despite the objections, Kenrick and the FAW pushed ahead with their plans. Once applications had been received, the FAW organised trial matches at the Racecourse Ground in Wrexham which took place in February 1876. The first match was played between players from the town's own football club and Druids. The second was held a week later, while a third trial match was organised on 26 February 1876 against a combined Oswestry team, made up of players from the town's football clubs. The game was disrupted when six of the eleven players who were scheduled to appear for the Welsh side failed to turn up. This led to other local players who had travelled to watch the match taking their places. The fourth and final trial match was played in early March. Further matches were cancelled as the ground was being prepared for the upcoming cricket season. Scotland also held trial matches for players who had never previously represented the national side, which were held at Hampden Park in February.

=== Team selection ===
For the final squad, Kenrick appointed himself as captain and selected six players from his own club, Druids, including Daniel Grey who was born in Scotland but had moved to Wales after obtaining his medical licence to open a practice in Ruabon. Two players from local rivals, Wrexham, and one from English club Oswestry were also selected. Usk-born William Evans, who played for the Oxford University team was the only player from South Wales selected, with the others all from North Wales other than John Hawley Edwards. He had been born in Shrewsbury and previously represented the England national football team in 1874. Edwards was a fellow solicitor and member of the Shropshire Wanderers. The Thomson brothers, goalkeeper David and forward George were also born in England but resided in Wales, the former was a captain in the Royal Denbighshire Militia. In Scotland, there was considerable interest in the team that would be arriving to play in the match, newspapers reporting that Beaumont Jarrett and Thomas Bridges Hughes may feature for the Welsh side.

All eleven players selected for Wales were amateurs, comprising "two lawyers, a timber merchant, a student, a soldier, a stonemason, a physician, a miner, a chimney sweep, an office worker and an insurance company employee". (Note: This quote is partially incorrect as William Williams was a chimney-top maker, rather than a chimney sweep.)

Like the Welsh, the Scots fielded six players from one club (Queens Park) and three of their players were making their international debut: James Lang, Robert W. Neill and Moses McNeil. The latter was the brother of three-time capped Henry McNeil, who was also named in the team. Lang had lost the sight in one eye while working at a shipyard. The majority of the squad from their 3–0 victory over England three weeks earlier was retained. Both teams played a 2–2–6 formation; i.e. two full-backs, two half-backs and six forwards.

== Match ==
=== Pre-match ===
The players from both sides travelled together from their hotels in Glasgow to the match in a horse-drawn omnibus and were greeted by a large crowd along the nearby highway. As Wales were an unknown team, the match drew a large crowd with the grandstand at the stadium being nearly full. Spectators were charged half-a-crown (equivalent to 1/8 pound sterling) for entry and the crowd at pitchside was described in the Wrexham Guardian as "very thick". In an attempt to see over the crowd, spectators climbed onto the roofs of parked taxis and horse buses and a nearby verge was filled with viewers. The official attendance of the match was recorded at 17,000, a new world record for a full international fixture, but some reports believe the number may have been even higher as between one and two hundred further spectators managed to gain access to the ground during the first half after a fence collapsed, allowing more people to enter.

Wales played in a plain white shirt, with the Prince of Wales's feathers embroidered on the chest, and black shorts. Scotland wore blue shirts and white shorts. Each player wore a different colour of socks so the crowd could recognise each player, and the list of colours was included in the match programme.

=== Match summary ===
Scotland captain Charles Campbell won the coin toss and choose to play "downhill" as the ground featured a slight incline. This was perceived as advantageous to the attacking side, but their choice meant they started the match with the sun in their faces. The Welsh captain Kenrick kicked off the match at 3:40 p.m. The Scots gained possession almost immediately and proceeded to attack the Welsh goal as John Ferguson won the first corner of the game after making a run down the wing, but the resulting setpiece was cleared without incident. Wales were forced to defend resolutely; the North Wales Chronicle noted that "the Welsh defended their goal in such a compact and determined way that the ball could not be passed through them." William Evans was called on early on to "save the fortress" by intercepting a pass and sending the ball upfield. The Welsh players were unable to break out of their own half as the game progressed and their forwards' passing game was described as "not much understood", while David Thomson in the Welsh goal made his first save soon after with a comfortable catch. The Welsh side's strongest play of the first half came from a Scottish corner when the ball fell to Kenrick who beat several opposition players to break into the Scottish half before being chased down by Sandy Kennedy. Kenrick was able to pass to Edwards but he was quickly dispossessed by the defenders.

The Scots were eager to take advantage of their early pressure but frequently allowed the ball to go out of play in their haste. They had a goal disallowed after Joseph Taylor scored directly from a corner without another player gaining a touch, while Evans again denied a goalscoring opportunity by blocking a goal-bound shot before David Thomson gathered the Scots' second attempt. On the 40th minute, Lang's cross was caught by David Thomson in the Welsh goal, but Ferguson "seeing an advantage, jumped forward with remarkable suddenness" according to newspaper reports, thus forcing Thomson to drop the ball which was subsequently kicked into the goal to the delight of the home crowd. Henry McNeil nearly added a second goal on the stroke of half-time after making a run at the Welsh goal before shooting over the crossbar just as the half was brought to a close.

After the half-time interval, the Welsh team looked to utilise the "downhill" advantage and mounted early forays into the Scottish half of the pitch. The well-practised Scots took advantage of the openness of the Welsh side and around eight minutes into the second half, the Scots added a second goal as Campbell played a pass to Henry McNeil who promptly shot against the post. The Welsh goalkeeper David Thomson, believing the ball had gone out of play, stopped defending the goal as the ball rebounded out to Billy MacKinnon, who was able to turn the ball into the unguarded net. Within five minutes, Scotland extended their lead further as Wales were forced to push forward in an attempt to get back into the game. Scotland regained possession and, after playing several passes around the encamped Welsh defence, the ball was crossed towards Lang who headed in a goal on his debut. Suffering a three-goal deficit, Wales were unable to threaten any answer in return, while Campbell forced a save when he advanced on the Welsh goal almost immediately after the kick-off. The Welsh goal survived further scares until Henry McNeil completed the scoring after a combined move upfield by Ferguson and Kennedy won a corner kick. A goalmouth scramble ensued from the resulting cross before Henry McNeil was able to convert. MacKinnon made a final attempt on goal near the end of the game, going on a mazy individual dribble through the Welsh defence before being stopped by Kenrick. The match ended in a 4–0 win for Scotland.

=== Details ===
25 March 1876

Scotland	4–0	Wales
Ferguson 40'; MacKinnon 48'; Lang 53'; H. McNeil 70'	Report

Hamilton Crescent, Partick
Attendance: 17,000
Referee: Robert Gardner (Scotland)

Scotland

Wales

GK	Alex McGeoch
FB	Robert W. Neill
FB	Joseph Taylor
HB	Charles Campbell (c)
HB	Sandy Kennedy
FW	John Ferguson
FW	Thomas Highet
FW	James Lang
FW	Billy MacKinnon
FW	Moses McNeil
FW	Henry McNeil

GK	David Thomson
FB	William Evans
FB	Llewelyn Kenrick (c)
HB	Edwin Cross
HB	William Williams
FW	Alfred Davies
FW	William Davies
FW	John Hawley Edwards
FW	Daniel Grey
FW	John Jones
FW	George Thomson

== Post match ==
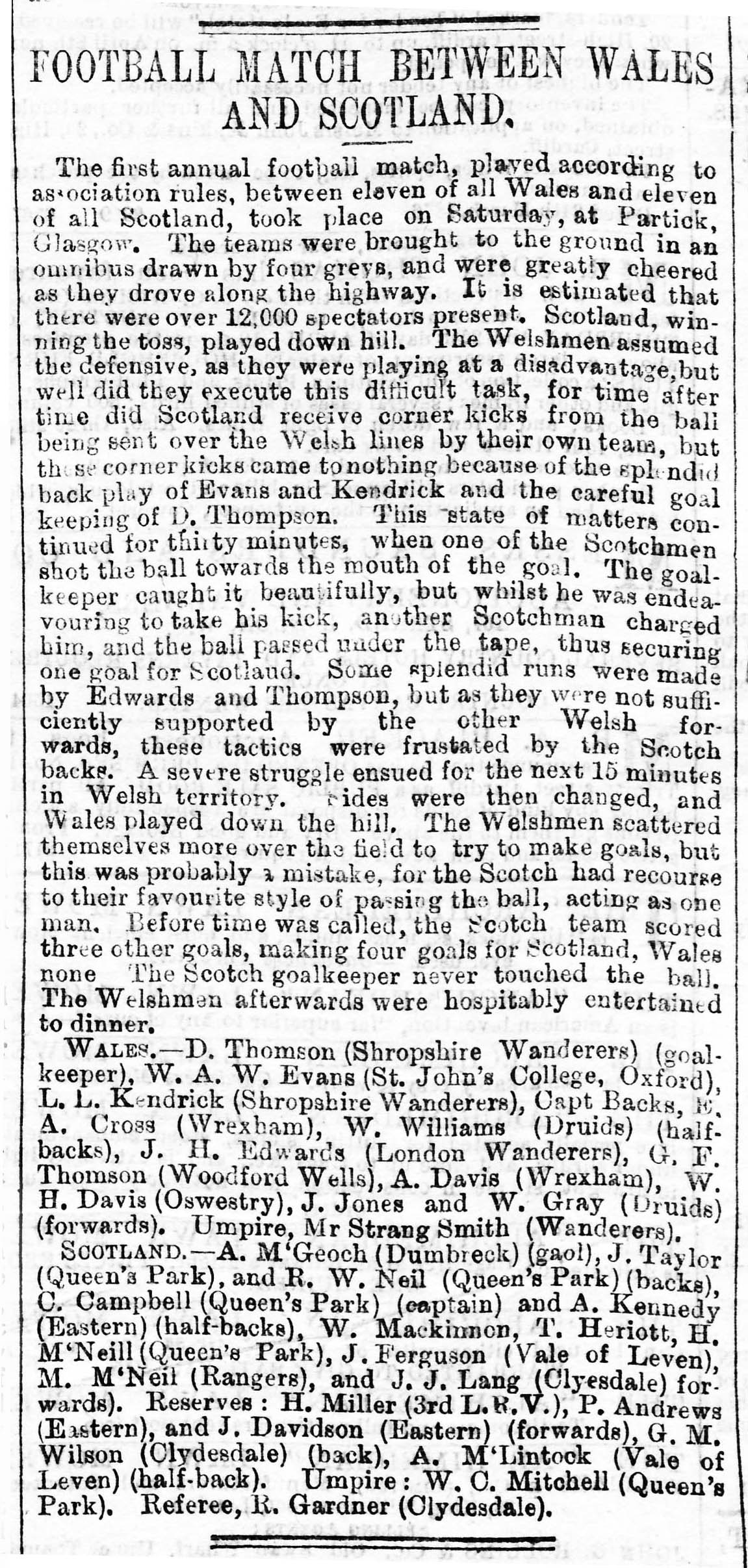
A newspaper report in The Cardiff Times of Wales' first match against Scotland in 1876

Among the Welsh side, Kenrick was picked out as one of the best performers in match reports, while the team's forwards were criticised as being the weak point of the side. In contrast, the Scottish forward line were praised for their performances, along with Kennedy. After the match, the Welsh visitors were hosted by the SFA with dinner at McRae's Hotel on Bath Street. The SFA chairman toasted the Welsh side and praised their "unflinching determination" during the match despite the defeat and Welsh captain Kenrick also gave a speech.

By playing in the fixture, Wales are recognised as the third oldest international football team. Their next international match came nearly a year later when they played a second fixture against Scotland on 5 March 1877 at the Racecourse Ground in Wrexham, which was the first international match to be played in Wales. Six of Wales' original side kept their places in the team and they gave a much improved performance as Scotland won the match 2–0. For three players, David Thomson, Edwards and John Jones, the 1876 game proved to be their only international appearance for Wales. Scotland had only played one match between the fixtures, losing 3–1 to England two days before the second match and travelling straight to Wales afterwards. The two countries continued to meet each other in friendly matches once each year in February or March until 1884 when the British Home Championship, which also involved England and Ireland, was inaugurated.

Scotland and Wales then met each year, other than when war intervened, until 1984, when the British Home Championship was abandoned. The Scots won the first 13 meetings against Wales, the first draw coming in 1889. It was not until 1905 that the Welsh claimed their first victory, defeating the Scots 3–1 at the Racecourse Ground. The two countries have also met in World Cup qualifying matches for the 1978 and 1986 tournaments, and were placed in the same group for the qualifying tournament for the 2014 World Cup. Since the two World Cup qualifying matches in 1985, the countries have met five times. The most recent was on 12 October 2012, when Wales won 2–1 in a World Cup qualifier.
