= Daniel Grey =

Welsh medical practitioner and footballer

Personal information
- Date of birth: c. 1848
- Place of birth: New Mills, Scotland
- Date of death: 26 February 1900 (aged 51–52)
- Place of death: Ruabon, Wales

Senior career*
Years	Team	Apps	(Gls)
1876–1880	Druids		

International career
1876–1878	Wales	2	(0)
- * Club domestic league appearances and goals

Daniel Grey (c. 1848 – 26 February 1900) was a Welsh medical practitioner who was prominent in the early days of Welsh football, making two appearances for the Wales national football team in the 1870s.

== Early life ==
Grey was born in New Mills, Lanarkshire in Scotland and attended Glasgow University. He obtained his medical qualifications in 1874, when he moved to Ruabon, near Wrexham, Denbighshire to start a medical practice.

== Football career ==
Grey was a keen sportsman and soon became one of the principals of the Druids club alongside Llewelyn Kenrick and the Thomson brothers, George and David. Grey became a founder member of the Football Association of Wales and attended the Association's inaugural Annual General Meeting at Shrewsbury on 24 May 1876.

In 1876, he also took part in trials organized by Kenrick to select Welsh players to represent their country in a match against Scotland. The match was played at Hamilton Crescent, Partick, the home of the West of Scotland Cricket Club on 25 March 1876, with Grey playing on the right wing. The Welsh were well defeated, conceding four goals without reply.

In 1877, Grey, described as "a busy player and tremendous worker", played (and scored) for Druids in the inaugural Welsh Cup tie, contributing £15 to the FAW's fund to purchase a trophy. Druids reached the final on 30 March 1878, losing 1–0 to local rivals Wrexham.

Grey's second international appearance came a week before the Cup Final, on 23 March 1878, in a 6–0 defeat by Scotland at the original Hampden Park.

== Later career ==
Grey had retired from active playing by 1880, but continued to attend Druids and Wrexham matches as a spectator. In his medical capacity, he was often called upon to tend to injured players. In 1889, a Welsh Cup match between Wrexham and Westminster Rovers became particularly violent and Grey was called upon to lecture the players about their behaviour.

Grey continued to live in Ruabon, where he died in February 1900 aged 51.

He was buried in Rhosymedre Church Cemetery.

== Honours ==
Druids

- Welsh Cup runners-up: 1878

== See also ==
- List of Wales international footballers born outside Wales
