= George Richards (Welsh footballer) =

Welsh footballer

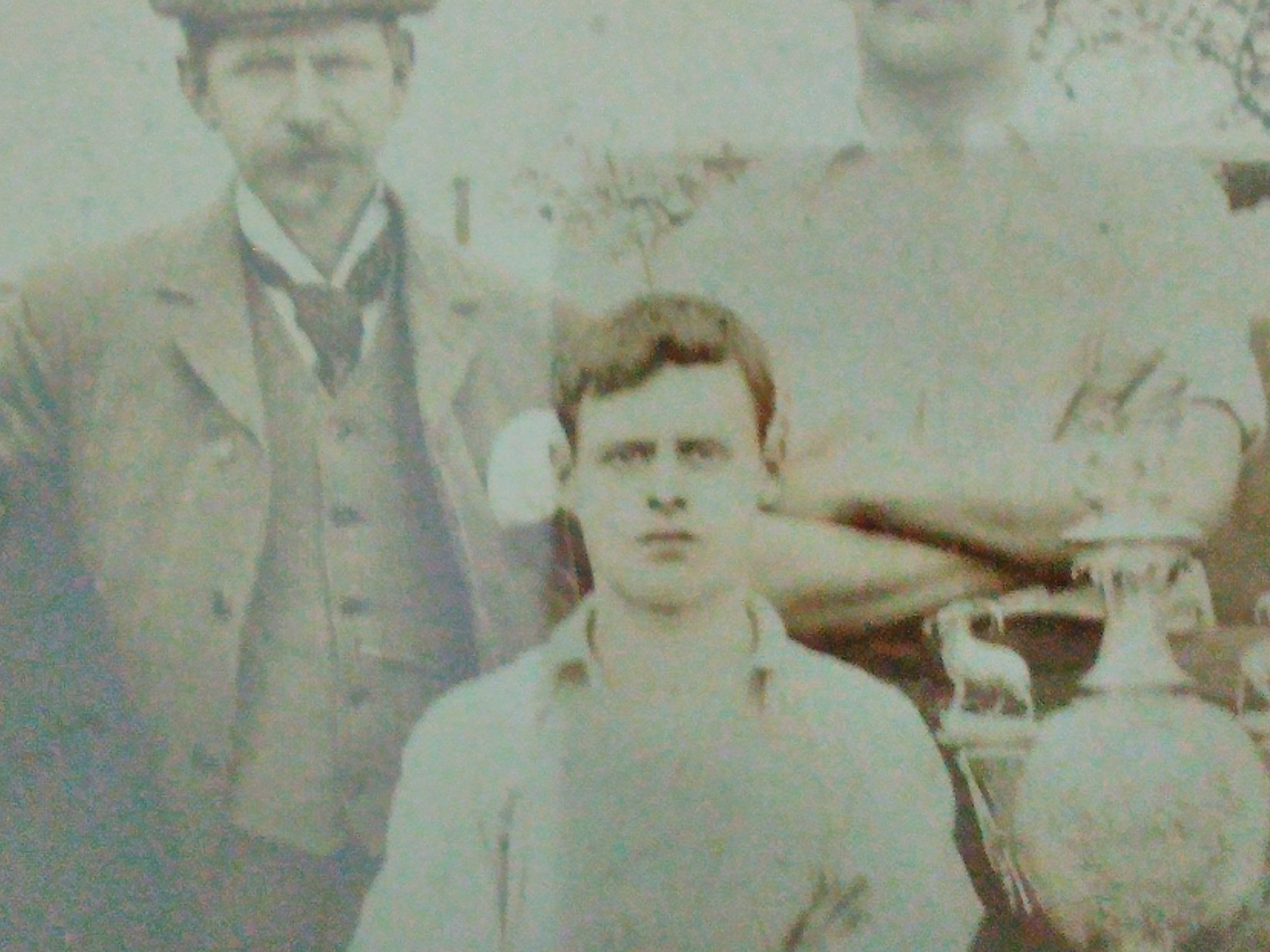

Personal information
- Date of birth: 1874
- Place of birth: Rhosymedre, Wales
- Date of death: 1944 (aged 69–70)
- Place of death: Cefn Mawr, Wales
- Position: Midfielder

Senior career*
Years	Team	Apps	(Gls)
1896–1899	Druids		
1899–1901	Gravesend		
1901–1903	Oswestry United		
1904–1905	Shrewsbury Town		
1905–1906	Druids		
1906–1908	Oswestry United		
1908–1911	Acrefair United		

International career
1899–1905	Wales	6	(0)
- * Club domestic league appearances and goals

George Richards (1874 – 1944) was a Welsh international footballer.

He was part of the Wales national football team between 1899 and 1905, playing 6 matches. He played his first match on 4 March 1899 against Ireland and his last match on 8 April 1905 against Ireland.

Six international appearances in all but only four international caps awarded due to the one cap per season rule. These caps were kept for many years in pristine condition by George's descendants, before they were stolen in a house burglary in Australia and never recovered.

At club level, he played for Druids, Gravesend, Oswestry United, Shrewsbury Town, Druids again, Oswestry United again and finally Acrefair United.

He was described a "a hard working and thoughtful player. George had a natural talent for ball control and relied on a "scientific approach", that is, working the ball skilfully out of defence. He played all of his football around the Welsh border country apart from two seasons at a higher level with Gravesend United in the Southern League where he made 24 appearances. In the Oswestry side, George had a good understanding with Tom Parry and the pair were regarded as the brains of the team".

The Wrexham Advertiser, Saturday March 11, 1899 described George as follows:- "Richards (Druids). Right Half. An exceedingly hard working half. Never tires. Is good both in defence and attack. Follows his forwards splendidly and is not above having a try at goal himself. Knows the combination game well and gives his wing every opportunity to get away".

George was a Welsh Cup winner on four occasions.

He won the Welsh Cup twice with the Druids in the 1897/98 and the 1898/99 seasons. In the first of these finals, they beat Wrexham 2-1 in a replay at the Cricket Field at Oswestry (after a 1-1 draw) and repeated the feat the following year, again against Wrexham, this time winning 1-0 at the Hand Field, Chirk in a replay (after a 2-2 draw).

George won the Welsh cup twice more with the Oswestry United team during two spells. In 1900/01 season, they beat his old club Druids 1-0 at the Racecourse Ground, Wrexham to take the trophy and then in his second spell at Oswestry, in 1906/07, they beat Whitchurch by 2-0 at the Racecourse Ground, Wrexham.

He played on until his late thirties, closing his career with Acrefair United in the Wrexham and District League.

George was later landlord of the Grosvenor Arms Hotel in Cefn Mawr, near Llangollen for many years. .

== See also ==
- List of Wales international footballers (alphabetical)
