= Samuel Jones (footballer, born 1870) =

Welsh footballer (1870–1931)

Personal information
- Date of birth: 1870
- Place of birth: Wrexham, Wales
- Date of death: 12 November 1931 (aged 60–61)
- Place of death: Wrexham, Wales
- Position: Goalkeeper

Senior career*
Years	Team	Apps	(Gls)
1890–1893	Wrexham	44	(0)
- Druids

International career
1893–1899	Wales	6	(0)
- * Club domestic league appearances and goals

Samuel Jones (1870 – 12 November 1931) was a Welsh footballer who played as a goalkeeper. He was part of the Wales national team between 1893 and 1899, playing six matches. He played his first match on 18 March 1893 against Scotland and his last match on 20 March 1899 against England. At club level, he played for Wrexham and Druids.

== See also ==
- List of Wales international footballers (alphabetical)
