= Plaskynaston Lane =

Demolished football stadium in Wales

Coordinates: 52°58′22″N 3°04′15″W

- Interactive map of Plaskynaston Lane
- Location: Cefn Mawr, Wrexham, Wales
- Owner: Cefn Druids A.F.C.
- Operator: Cefn Druids A.F.C.
- Capacity: 2,000

Tenant
- Cefn Druids A.F.C.

Plaskynaston Lane is a demolished football stadium in Cefn Mawr, Wrexham, Wales. It was the home stadium of Cefn Druids A.F.C. of the Welsh Premier from 1961 until 2010. The stadium held 2,000 spectators with 280 seated.

The ground was opened in 1961 under a peppercorn 99 year lease with a visit from a Manchester United XI featuring a young George Best against Druids United. The line ups from this match were hung up at Plaskynaston Lane in the on site Social Club until moving to The Rock in 2010.

Floodlights were erected in Summer 1998 paid for from the club's naming rights sponsorship deal with chemical firm Flexsys. This enabled Druids to reach the criteria required for the League of Wales when they won the Cymru Alliance title the following season in 1998-99 under Gareth Powell's management.

Around this time, Plaskynaston Lane also had a second stand built behind the goal named "The Brian Mackie Stand" in honour of the club's then committee member but future Chairperson.

Throughout the 2000s, Plaskynaston Lane also hosted several Wales Youth Internationals with the first taking place in June 2003 against Scotland.

The last game played at the ground was the Tony Collins Memorial Cup Final U12, between Llay FC and Marford & Gresford FC, refereed by Lewys Evans in memory of a former Cefn Druids A.F.C. player.

The site is now used as a Tesco superstore.
