= Reuben Humphreys =

Welsh footballer

Personal information
- Date of birth: 13 September 1865
- Place of birth: Glyn Ceiriog, Denbighshire, Wales
- Date of death: 1944 (aged 78)
- Place of death: Oswestry, Shropshire

Senior career*
Years	Team	Apps	(Gls)
- Druids

International career
1888	Wales	1	(0)
- * Club domestic league appearances and goals

Reuben Humphreys (born 1866) was a Welsh international footballer. He was part of the Wales national football team, playing 1 match on 3 March 1888 against Ireland. At club level, he played for Druids.

== See also ==
- List of Wales international footballers (alphabetical)
