= Denbighshire League =

Former Welsh football league

The Denbighshire League was a league in the early days of Welsh football. Originally titled the Welsh Senior League, it ran from 1890 until 1902. It was mainly made up of teams from the Wrexham area, with sporadic entrants from Mid Wales and the North Wales Coast. It was one of the first organised Football Leagues in Wales. The league was resurrected in September 1903 under the name the Wrexham and District League.

== Founding Members ==
The following clubs took part in the 1890–91 season.

- Druids FC
- Rhos FC
- Rhostyllen Victoria FC
- Rhyl FC
- Ruabon FC
- Westminster Rovers

== Champions ==
| Season | Champions | Runners up | Third | Notes |
|---|---|---|---|---|
| 1890-91 | Druids | Rhos | Rhostyllen Victoria | |
| 1891-92 | | | | League Not Run |
| 1892-93 | Druids | Chirk | Brymbo Institute | |
| 1893-94 | Westminster Rovers | Druids | Brymbo Institute | |
| 1894-95 | Wrexham | Westminster Rovers | Druids | |
| 1895-96 | Wrexham | Rhos | Druids | |
| 1896-97 | Druids | Newtown | Oswestry United | |
| 1897-98 | Druids Reserves | Wrexham Reserves | Rhos Eagle Wanderers | |
| 1898-99 | Chirk Reserves | Wrexham Reserves | Adwy United | |
| 1899–1900 | Wrexham Reserves | Chirk Reserves | Oswestry United Reserves | |
| 1900-01 | Broughton United | Adwy Victoria | Druids Reserves | |
| 1901-02 | Broughton United | Druids Reserves | Oswestry United Reserves | |
