= Charles Thomas (footballer) =

Welsh footballer

Personal information
- Date of birth: 1876
- Place of birth: Wales
- Date of death: 1935 (aged 58–59)
- Position: Defender

Senior career*
Years	Team	Apps	(Gls)
- Druids

International career
1899–1900	Wales	2	(0)
- * Club domestic league appearances and goals

Charles Thomas (1876 – 1935) was a Welsh international footballer. He was part of the Wales national football team between 1899 and 1900, playing 2 matches. He played his first match on 4 March 1899 against Ireland and his last match on 3 February 1900 against Scotland. At club level, he played for Druids where he was Club Captain.

He emigrated to America in 1906 and his football career was ended in March 1907 when his leg was severed by a train in Boston.

== See also ==
- List of Wales international footballers (alphabetical)
