= William P. Jones =

Welsh footballer

Personal information
- Date of birth: 1870
- Place of birth: Wales
- Date of death: 1953 (aged 82–83)

Senior career*
Years	Team	Apps	(Gls)
- Druids

International career
1889–1890	Wales	4	(0)
- * Club domestic league appearances and goals

William P. Jones (1870–1953) was a Welsh international footballer. He was part of the Wales national football team between 1889 and 1890, playing 4 matches. He played his first match on 23 February 1889 against England and his last match on 22 March 1890 against Scotland. At club level, he played for Druids.

== See also ==
- List of Wales international footballers (alphabetical)
