= Druids United F.C. =

Former association football club in Wales

Druids United
- Full name: Druids United Football Club
- Nicknames: The Ancients, Druids
- Founded: August 1927 (amalgamation of Rhosymedre Druids F.C. and Acrefair United F.C.)
- Dissolved: 1992 (merged with Cefn Albion F.C. to form Cefn Druids)
- Ground: Plaskynaston Lane; Cefn Mawr; Wrexham

Druids United F.C. were a football club based in the village of Cefn Mawr, Wrexham Wales. The club was formed in August 1927 after the amalgamation between Druids F.C. and Acrefair United F.C..

The club played at two previous grounds before redeveloping a site in the heart of Cefn Mawr, known as Plaskynaston Lane, where football is still being played by the successor club Cefn Druids A.F.C. (This is incorrect as the ground is now a Tesco. Cefn Druids play at The Rock in Cefn Mawr).

== History ==
For a full history see; List of football seasons involving Cefn Druids and its predecessor clubs

The once successful Druids F.C., who formed in 1869 as Plasmadoc F.C., fell on hard times after reforming following the events of the Great War. Playing on the Church Field in Rhosymedre the former Giants of Welsh football, Druids F.C. felt that the only way to survive as a competitive team was to merge with another local club Acrefair United F.C. Joining the Welsh National League (North) and playing from the Church Field, the team failed to provide a strong competition in the short lived league.

Following the disbanding of the Welsh National League (North) in 1930, Druids United joined the Wrexham & District League and relocated to a new ground in Acrefair. Moving to the new ground provided the club with some success as they went on to be crowned league Champions for the 1931–32 and again in 1933–34. Following the league title the previous season, Druids United went on to finish runners-up to Llanerch Celts F.C., followed by a third place spot in 1935–36. Another league title in 1936–37 would see Druids United finish the interwar period in good standing as a football club in the Wrexham area, before the disruption to competitive football following the impending events of World War II.

As the country's people tried to recover following the events of the War, football resumed in Acrefair with Druids United joining the Welsh National League (Wrexham Area) Division One for the start of the 1945–46 season. Success in the league would follow as Druids United would be crowned Champions for the 1950–51 season and go on to claim a runners-up spot, second to Overton St. Mary's F.C., in 1952–53. It was during this period the club would create links with the Monsanto Company, which had interest in the town of Cefn Mawr, and the club relocating to The Bont, a football pitch overshadowed by the UNESCO World Heritage Site recognised Pontcysyllte Aqueduct. With a new home and some modest investment, the 1956–57 season saw the Druids gain a second runners-up spot, behind Welshpool, along with a healthy run in the Welsh Amateur Cup. Reaching the final, a feat the previous club Druids F.C. last achieved in 1903–04, they drew with Porthmadog F.C., but lost the replay at the Farrar Road Stadium, Bangor. Using profits from the cup run the club bought land in the heart of Cefn Mawr, which once sited by the Plas Kynaston Colliery railway sidings. Despite this the ground would not be prepared for a pitch until 1961.

Another successful cup run in the 1957–58 season saw the Druids win the Welsh Youth Cup for the first time, successfully defending the trophy the following season. With two runners-up spots in the Welsh National League (Wrexham Area) Division One in 1958–59 and 1959–60, Druids United's time at The Bont the most successful period at any home.

Druids United made their final ground move, this time to the newly developed site at Plaskynaston Lane in 1961, which boasted dressing rooms and ground facilities that surpassed all other amateur clubs in Wales at the time. To mark the occasion a match was played against a Manchester United Youth team, which boasted the talent of a young George Best. Despite the move to the more than adequate ground, the Druids fell on hard times, finishing second from bottom in 1965–66, above Summerhill F.C., only to suffer relegation to the Welsh National League (Wrexham Area) Division Two in 1968–69. Their first season outside Division One since joining the league saw the Druids win Division Two at the first attempt.

Ten seasons would follow before Druids United would see anymore silver, with the North East Wales FA Challenge Cup in 1979–80. The cup win would be Druids United's last trophy, as with the success of local rivals Cefn Albion, Druids United, like their predecessors Druids F.C., would fall on hard times. Relegated once again form the Welsh National League (Wrexham Area) Division One in 1982–83, the Druids had one final flurry of favour as they progressed to the Welsh National League Division Two Cup in 1987–88. Druids United gained promotion through election to the Welsh National League (Wrexham Area) Premier Division for the 1990–91, yet despite this good fortune finished second from bottom and dead last during their final two seasons.

With the expansion of the fledgling Cymru Alliance the need for a stronger team from the area was realised, especially as local rivals Cefn Albion finished one place above rock bottom Druids United the previous season. Because of the intervention of former Aston Villa Winger, Chester City manager and Cefn Mawr native, Ken Roberts, the long avoided amalgamation between the club and local rivals Cefn Albion was achieved in 1992. The new outfit Cefn Druids joined the Cymru Alliance for the 1992–93 season playing at the Plaskynaston Lane ground.

== Honours ==
=== League ===
- Wrexham & District Amateur League
  - 1931–32, 1933–34, 1936–37
- Welsh National League (Wrexham Area) Division One
  - 1950–51
- Welsh National League (Wrexham Area) Division Two
  - 1969–70

=== Cup ===
- Welsh Youth Cup
  - 1957–58, 1958–59
- North East Wales FA Challenge Cup
  - 1979–80

== Notes and references ==
Notes

1. ^{a} Church Field, Rhosymedre was home at one point to the original Druids F.C. as well as the preceding club Druids United and Cefn Albion. Cefn Druids, who were formed by the amalgamation Druids United and Cefn Albion, play in a newly built stadium in Rhosymedre called The Rock/Rhosymedre Stadium. The new stadium is mere metres away from Church Field.
