= Wrexham and District League =

- Founded: 1903; 1925 (re-founded)
- First season: 1903–04; 1925–26 (re-founded)
- Folded: 1912; 1939 (dissolved)
- Country: Wales
- Domestic cup(s): Welsh Cup; Welsh Amateur Cup
- Last champions: Caergwrle Wanderers (1938–39) (1938-39)
- Most championships: Rhos Rangers (1903–1912); Llanerch Celts (1925–1939)

The Wrexham and District League was a football league in Wales. It was made up of teams from Wrexham County Borough, Flintshire and Denbighshire

== History ==
The Wrexham and District League ran during the early years of the twentieth century from 1903-1912. The league previous ran as the Welsh Senior League and the Denbighshire League.

At that time the senior clubs in the Wrexham area played in English leagues such as The Combination and the Birmingham & District League. Their reserve sides, along with local amateur teams, contested the Wrexham and District League. The Wrexham and District League folded in 1912 and its clubs joined the North Wales Alliance League.

In the inter-war years, the new Welsh National League with its various sections was organised. Clubs from the Wrexham area, and the rest of North Wales, joined the Welsh National League Northern Section which ran from 1921-1930.

Teams from the Wrexham Area competed in the Wrexham and District League (1925-1939).

After World War II they re-organised as the Welsh National League (Wrexham Area).

== Divisional Champions ==
=== 1903–1912 ===
Season	Division One	Division Two
1903–04	Brymbo Victoria	
1904–05	Brymbo Victoria	Esclusham White Stars
1905–06	Brymbo Victoria	Cefn Albion
1906–07	Rhos Rangers	
1907–08	Esclusham White Stars	Summerhill
1908–09	Rhos Rangers	Brymbo Institute
1909–10	Rhos Rangers	Ponkey North End
1910–11	Rhos Rangers	Gwersyllt Rangers
1911–12	Rhos Rangers	Royal Welch Fusiliers

=== 1925–1939 ===
Season	Division One
1925–26	Johnstown
1926–27	Johnstown
1927–28	Johnstown
1928–29	Southsea Sports Club
1929–30	Holt
1930–31	Brynmally
1931–32	Druids United
1932–33	Llanerch Celts
1933–34	Druids United
1934–35	Llanerch Celts
1935–36	Llanerch Celts
1936–37	Druids United
1937–38	Llanerch Celts
1938–39	Caergwrle Wanderers
