= Rhosllanerchrugog F.C. (1889) =

Football club in Rhosllanerchrugog, Wales (1889–1896)

Rhosllanerchrugog
- Full name: Rhosllanerchrugog Football Club
- Nickname: Rhos
- Founded: 1889
- Dissolved: 1896
- Ground: Johnstown Football Ground
Home colours

Rhosllanerchrugog F.C. was a football club based in Rhosllanerchrugog, Wales. The club was often simply called Rhos.

== History ==
The club's first appearance was via its entry into the first round of the Welsh Cup in 1889–90; although favoured to beat Overton it lost 2–1.

The club entered the English FA Cup for three seasons during the nineteenth century. Its final appearance in the competition was an 8–2 home defeat to Prescot in 1892–93, after scoring the first two goals and still holding a 2–1 lead at half-time.

The club initially disbanded in July 1891, not being able to find a practice ground, but it continued for the next few seasons; it also came close to disbanding in 1894, due to "meagre support" and losses of nearly £14 per season. It finally disbanded on 6 November 1896, "entirely due to the indifference shown by the players in not turning up when selected". The committee of the club held fund-raising efforts over the next year in order to clear the club's debts.

== Colours ==
The club wore red shirts.

== Ground ==
The club played at the Football Ground in Johnstown.

== Notable players ==
Went on to or previously played Professional or International football

- (Wales) Abel Hughes
- (Wales) Joseph Owens
- (Wales) Seth Powell
- (Wales) Robert Roberts

== League history ==
The club was a founding member of the Welsh Senior League, one of the first organised football leagues in Wales.

Season	League	Played	Won	Drew	Lost	Goals For	Goals Against	Points	Position	Teams in League	Notes
1890–91	Welsh Senior League	9	5	0	4	26	17	10	2	6	League Finished after winners decided
1891–92	Welsh Senior League										League Not Run
1892–93	Welsh Senior League	14	6	1	7	25	24	13	5	8	
1893–94	Welsh Senior League	15	5	1	9	26	44	11	6	9	
1894–95	Welsh Senior League	12	0	1	11	12	62	1	9	9	
1895–96	Welsh Senior League	12	6	4	2	34	21	16	2	7	
1896–97	Welsh Senior League										Withdrew

== Cup results ==
Season	Competition	Round	Opposition	Score	Notes
1889–90	Welsh Cup	First Round	Overton	1–2	
1890–91	FA Cup	First Qualifying Round	Shrewsbury Town	w/o	
1890–91	FA Cup	Second Qualifying Round	Cliftonville	w/o	
1890–91	Welsh Cup	Round 1	Corwen	2–0	
1890–91	Welsh Cup	Round 2	Chirk	1–2	
1891–92	FA Cup	First Qualifying Round	Chester	0–1	
1891–92	Welsh Cup	Round 1	Llangollen Rovers	6–1	
1891–92	Welsh Cup	Round 2	Druids	2–1	
1891–92	Welsh Cup	Quarter Final	Wrexham	1–3	
1892–93	FA Cup	First Qualifying Round	Prescot	2–8	
1892–93	Welsh Cup	Round 1			Bye
1892–93	Welsh Cup	Round 2	Rhostyllen Victoria	1–1	
1892–93	Welsh Cup	Round 2	Rhostyllen Victoria	3–2	Replay
1892–93	Welsh Cup	Round 3	Druids	2–4	
1893–94	Welsh Cup	Round 1	Brymbo Institute	3–5	Rhos had a 3–1 lead at half-time
1894–95	Welsh Cup	Round 1	Wellington Town	4–4	Wellington withdrew
1894–95	Welsh Cup	Round 2	Brymbo Institute	1–4	
1896–97	Welsh Cup	Round 1	Brymbo Institute	w/o	Rhosllanerchrugog withdrew

== See also ==
- Rhosllanerchrugog F.C. (2017), 2017 revival of the club
