= NEWFA Challenge Cup =

Association football tournament in Wales

- Founded: 1969
- Region: Wales
- Current champions: Airbus UK Broughton
- Most championships: Buckley Town (9 wins)
- 2025–26

The North East Wales FA Challenge Cup is a football knockout tournament involving teams from in North Wales who play in leagues administered and associated with the North East Wales Football Association.

== Previous winners ==
A full set of winners can be found below.

=== 1960s ===
- 1969–70: – Brymbo Steelworks

=== 1970s ===
- 1970–71: – Brymbo Steelworks
- 1971–72: – Bala Town
- 1972–73: – Gresford Athletic
- 1973–74: – Llangollen Town
- 1974–75: – Buckley Rovers
- 1975–76: – Rhosddu
- 1976–77: – Llay Welfare
- 1977–78: – Cefn Albion
- 1978–79: – Sunblest United
- 1979–80: – Buckley Town

=== 1980s ===
- 1980–81: – Buckley Town
- 1981–82: – Brymbo Steelworks
- 1982–83: – Brymbo Steelworks
- 1983–84: – Llay Royal British Legion
- 1984–85: – Brymbo Steelworks
- 1985–86: – Mold Alexandra
- 1986–87: – Mold Alexandra
- 1987–88: – Mold Alexandra
- 1988–89: – Lex XI
- 1989–90: – Llay Royal British Legion

=== 1990s ===
- 1990–91: – Lex XI
- 1991–92: – Gresford Athletic
- 1992–93: – Cefn Druids
- 1993–94: – Wrexham
- 1994–95: – Wrexham
- 1995–96: – Brymbo
- 1996–97: – Rhostyllen Villa
- 1997–98: – Wrexham
- 1998–99: – Flexsys Cefn Druids
- 1999–2000: – Oswestry Town

=== 2000s ===
- 2000–01: – Buckley Town
- 2001–02: – Buckley Town
- 2002–03: – Buckley Town
- 2003–04: – Bala Town
- 2004–05: – Buckley Town
- 2005–06: – Buckley Town
- 2006–07: – Bala Town
- 2007–08: – Bala Town
- 2008–09: – Lex XI
- 2009–10: – Buckley Town

=== 2010s ===
- 2010–11: – Rhos Aelwyd
- 2011–12: – Cefn Druids
- 2012–13: – Buckley Town
- 2013–14: – Cefn Druids
- 2014–15: – Mold Alexandra
- 2015–16: – Cefn Druids
- 2016–17: – Gresford Athletic
- 2017–18: – Ruthin Town
- 2018–19: – Cefn Druids
- 2019–20: – Competition not completed - Covid-19 pandemic

=== 2020s ===
- 2020–21: – No competition - Covid-19 pandemic
- 2021–22: – Ruthin Town
- 2022–23: – Holywell Town
- 2023–24: – Flint Mountain
- 2024–25: – Airbus UK Broughton
- 2025–26: – Airbus UK Broughton

== Number of competition wins ==
- Buckley Town – 9
- Brymbo Steelworks/ Byrmbo – 6
- Cefn Druids – 6
- Bala Town – 4
- Mold Alexandra – 4
- Gresford Athletic – 3
- Lex XI – 3
- Wrexham – 3
- Airbus UK Broughton – 2
- Llay Royal British Legion – 2
- Ruthin Town – 2
- Buckley Rovers – 1
- Cefn Albion – 1
- Flint Mountain – 1
- Holywell Town – 1
- Llangollen Town – 1
- Llay Welfare – 1
- Oswestry Town – 1
- Rhos Aelwyd – 1
- Rhosddu – 1
- Rhostyllen Villa – 1
- Sunblest United – 1
