= Ephraim Williams (footballer) =

Welsh footballer

Personal information
- Date of birth: 13 September 1877
- Place of birth: Chirk, Wales
- Date of death: 3 November 1954 (aged 77)
- Place of death: Chirk, Wales
- Positions: Outside left; inside left

Senior career*
Years	Team	Apps	(Gls)
1896-1900	Chirk		
1900-1903	Druids		
1903-1907	Chirk		

International career
1901–1902	Wales	5	(0)
- * Club domestic league appearances and goals

Ephraim Williams (1877 – 1954) was a Welsh international footballer. He was part of the Wales national football team between 1901 and 1902, playing five matches. He played his first match on 2 March 1901 against Scotland and his last match on 3 March 1902 against England. At club level, he played for Chirk and Druids.

== See also ==
- List of Wales international footballers (alphabetical)
