= 1902–03 Welsh Amateur Cup =

1902-03 Welsh Amateur Cup
Tournament details
- Country: Wales

Final positions
- Champions: Druids Reserves
- Runners-up: Bangor Reserves

The 1902–03 Welsh Amateur Cup was the thirteenth season of the Welsh Amateur Cup. The cup was won by Druids Reserves who defeated Bangor Reserves 4–0 in the final, at The Racecourse, Wrexham.

== First round ==
Home team	Result	Away team	Remarks
Wrexham Victoria	2-0	Gwersyllt	
(England) Oswestry United Reserve	10-0	Cambrian Leather Works	
Flint	6-1	Shotton Rangers	
Mynydd Isa	0-2	Mold Amateurs	
Gresford	0-4	Broughton United	
Saltney	3-1	Brymbo Victoria	
Black Park	3-1	Plasbennion United	
Llandinam	2-3	Newtown North End	
Llanidloes	1-1	Towyn	
(England) Chester Reserves	All received a Bye		
(England) Whitchurch	All received a Bye		
Bala Press	All received a Bye		
Ruthin	All received a Bye		
Corwen	All received a Bye		
Chirk Reserve	All received a Bye		
Druids Reserves	All received a Bye		
Bangor Reserves	All received a Bye		
Llanrwst	All received a Bye		
Porthmadog Reserves	All received a Bye		
Rhyl Athletic	All received a Bye		
Prestatyn	All received a Bye		
Connah's Quay	All received a Bye		
Flint United A.C.	All received a Bye		
Esclusham White Stars	All received a Bye		
Machynlleth	All received a Bye		
Llanfyllin	All received a Bye		

== Second round ==
Home team	Result	Away team	Remarks
Chirk Reserve		Black Park	
Wrexham Victoria	3-1	Saltney	
(England) Oswestry United Reserve	2-2	Druids Reserves	Druids won replay 2–1.
Bangor Reserves		Porthmadog Reserves	Porthmadog Scratched
Rhyl Town Reserves	7-2	Rhyl Athletic	
Connah's Quay	2-1	Mold Amateurs	
Flint United A.C.	3-1	Flint	
Broughton United	4-0	Esclusham White Stars	
Llanfyllin	2-1	Llanidloes	
Newtown North End	5-0	Machynlleth	
Bala Press	5-0	Ruthin	
(England) Chester Reserves	Don't appear in draw, but had a Bye in First Round, and appear in Third Round draw.		
Llanrwst	Don't appear in draw, but had a Bye in First Round, and appear in Third Round draw.		
Prestatyn	Don't appear in draw, but had a Bye in First Round, and appear in Third Round draw.		
(England) Whitchurch	Don't appear in draw, but had a Bye in First Round, and appear in Third Round draw.		

== Third round ==
Home team	Result	Away team	Remarks
Llanrwst	1-1	Bangor Reserves	Bangor won replay 3–0.
Rhyl Reserves	3-2	Prestatyn	
Flint United A.C.	2-1	Connah's Quay	
Wrexham Victoria	1-0	Broughton United	
Druids Reserve	6-0	Chirk Reserve	
Llanidloes	3-2	Newtown North End	
Corwen	1-3	Bala Press	
(England) Whitchurch	7-1	(England) Chester Reserves	

== Fourth round ==
Home team	Result	Away team	Remarks
Bangor Reserves	6-2	Rhyl Reserves	
Wrexham Victoria	2-2	Flint United A.C.	Flint won replay 2-0
Llanidloes	1-2	(England) Whitchurch	Protest - awarded to Llanidloes
Druids Reserve	5-1	Bala Press	

== Semi-final ==
	Result		Venue
Llanidloes	0-4	Druids Reserve	Welshpool
Bangor Reserves	2-1	Flint United A.C.	Rhyl

== Final ==
Winner	Result	Runner-up	Venue
Druids Reserves	4-0	Bangor Reserves	The Racecourse, Wrexham

April 1903

Druids Reserves	4-0	Bangor Reserves
Lloyd x3 Richards

The Racecourse Ground, Wrexham

Druids Reserves	Bangor Reserves
