= Rhos Athletic F.C. =

Football club in Rhosllanerchrugog, Wales (1889–1896)

Rhos (Athletic)
- Full name: Rhos (Athletic) Football Club
- Nickname(s): Rhosites
- Founded: 1906
- Dissolved: 1928
- Ground: Coach and Horses
- Secretary: D. W. Owens
Original colours	1926–28 colours

Rhos Athletic F.C. was an association football team from Rhosllanerchrugog, Wales, active in the 1920s.

== History ==
There was at least one previous club with the same name, but the first reference to this particular club is from the 1906–07 season. It went into abeyance during the First World War, and on resumption of football in 1919–20, it immediately enjoyed success, winning the North Wales Alliance League. It also reached the third round of the Welsh Cup, and only lost to Wrexham in a replay.

The club therefore joined the new Welsh National League in 1921, and was again instantly successful. The Rhosites ended the 1921–22 season as double winners, as League champion despite a 2 point deduction for fielding unregistered players in an emergency, and winners of the League's Challenge Cup; in the final the club beat Holyhead Town at Bangor with two first-half goals, the first via a cross-cum-shot from Ted Hughes which took a moment to register with players and crowd. These successes helped to boost the club's finances to the extent that by 1922 it was only making a small £20 loss over the season. In 1923, it also applied for one of the 14 places in the FA Cup qualifying rounds open to Welsh clubs, but was unsuccessful.

From the 1921–22 season, the club was mostly referred to simply as Rhos, which had been used by a separate club in the 1910s. By 1922 the club was referring to itself as the Rhos Football Club.

Its run of success however ran out of steam quickly, and its support dropped off heavily. The club made a large loss in 1923–24 and was forced to look in the amateur ranks for new players, and although the club had its best Welsh Cup run in 1925–26, reaching the quarter-final (where it lost 1–0 at Rhyl), in 1926–27 it finished bottom of the League's first division; before the season ended, the club announced it would resign at the season's end, financial difficulties meaning the club was losing money on every match — its highest gate receipts at home that season had not even reached £7. Indeed the club had been forced to ask the Welsh FA for financial assistance even to complete the season, and could only afford to travel to Llandudno thanks to a donation from a local sportsman.

Nevertheless, the club had a change of heart, and applied for re-election, in which it succeeded, gaining 17 votes out of a maximum of 20. However it did not survive the season, resigning in April 1928 because of financial difficulties — although the Welsh FA did not accept the resignation and sought to find a way for the club to complete the season, such a measure proved impossible, and the club's record was expunged. The club's final match was a 6–2 defeat at home to New Brighton reserves, at which point the club was 17th out of 19, with 15 points from 26 matches, although it had had 4 deducted for fielding ineligible players. By the start of the 1931 season there were not even any amateur clubs left in Rhosllanerchrugog.

== Colours ==
The club originally wore red shirts, but by 1926 had changed to blue and white striped shirts.

== Ground ==
The club's ground was at the Coach and Horses Inn, and in 1919 it was sold at auction to a Mrs Jones of the Fleece Hotel for £8,000.

== Notable players ==
- Matthew Burton, who joined the club in 1925 after his Football League career was over.
- Edward Roberts, who joined the club from Wrexham in 1923.
- Jack Ellis, a full-back with Tranmere Rovers and Wrexham, who joined the club as player-manager in 1922; Ellis also took over as licensee of the Eagles public house.
