= Edward Bowen (footballer, born 1858) =

Welsh footballer

Personal information
- Date of birth: 1858
- Place of birth: Wales
- Date of death: 1923 (aged 64–65)
- Position: Forward

Senior career*
Years	Team	Apps	(Gls)
- Druids

International career
1880–1883	Wales	2	(0)
- * Club domestic league appearances and goals

Edward Bowen (1858 – 1923) was a Welsh footballer. He was part of the Wales national football team between 1880 and 1883, playing 2 matches. He played his first match on 27 March 1880 against Scotland and his last match on 12 March 1883 against Scotland. At club level, he played for Druids.

== See also ==
- List of Wales international footballers (alphabetical)
