= Druids F.C. =

Former association football club in Wales

Druids
- Full name: Druids Football Club
- Nicknames: The Ancients, Druids, The Ancient Britons
- Founded: October 1872 (as Ruabon Rovers FC)
- Dissolved: August 1927 (merged with Acrefair United F.C. to form Druids United)
- Ground: Wynnstay Park; Ruabon; Wrexham
Home colours

Druids F.C. were a football club based in the village of Ruabon near Wrexham, Wales. The club was founded in October 1872 as Ruabon Rovers F.C. by David Thomson and his brother, George, of Ruabon. In 1874 the club became Plasmadoc F.C. before changing their name to Druids F.C. in 1876.

Druids are notable as becoming the first Welsh club to enter the English FA Cup and Birmingham & District League and winning the Welsh Cup eight times.

Their traditional home was Wynnstay Park on the Wynnstay Estate, and their traditional colours were white shirts, black shorts with either black and cerise or simply black socks.

== History ==
It is claimed by the later successor club that Druids FC formed in 1872 when Plasmadoc FC merged with Ruabon Rovers and Ruabon Volunteers under the guidance of Llewelyn Kenrick. Contemporary sources refute this version of events.

It was reported that on 6 October 1872, the opening game of a football club for the district was played at Plasmadoc Park. Mr George Hampden Whalley was selected as the captain of the club. On 23 October 1872 a meeting was held by Ruabon Rovers at the Wynnstay Arms where the club committee was selected. It included people like David Thomson and Dr Daniel Grey. George Hampden Whalley was elected as president. Whalley would later also hold this position when the club became Druids and at rival club Ruabon FC.

In February 1873 Ruabon Rovers played a fixture against Ruabon Volunteers, which shows these clubs were both still active after the merger date proposed by the modern-day club. Ruabon Volunteers were also known as the 2nd Denbighshire Volunteers so were actually a Military team.

In September 1873 the club was still known as Ruabon Rovers as evidenced in the annual meeting of the club, where a number of influential people, later associated with Druids, were present and held key roles, such as David and George Thomson. The issue of the club's foundation is further muddied when Llewelyn Kenrick was present at the founding of a football club in Ruabon in September 1873.

The name of the club appears interchangeable between Ruabon Rovers and Plasmadoc in 1873, and the club was often referred to as the Plasmadoc Club from 1874 up until 1876. When speaking in 1882, Llewelyn Kenrick stated that the club had been started by David Thomson in 1874 as the Plasmadoc Club.

The name Druids does not appear in the local press until January 1876. By 1877 the club were commonly referred to as Druids Football Club.

On 2 February 1876, the Football Association of Wales was founded by Kenrick at the Wynnstay Arms Hotel, Wrexham and was followed on 25 March with Wales' first international match against Scotland. The match which was organised by Kenrick, himself, saw him gain his first cap playing in a full back position.

1876 also saw Druids become the first Welsh club to enter the newly organised English F.A. Cup. Drawn against Shropshire Wanderers in the First round, Druids withdrew before the match was played. In the next year, Druids once again entered the F.A. Cup, again drawn against Shropshire Wanderers in the First round, they progressed to the Third round where they were thumped 8–0 by eventual Runners-up Royal Engineers.

1877 saw the inaugural season of the Football Association of Wales Challenge Cup competition, to run on similar lines to the English FA Cup. Druids entered the competition, playing Newtown in the first ever match in the competition, and eventually reaching the Final, played at Acton Park, Wrexham, where they lost to Wrexham 1–0.

The club were allowed to play at Plasmadoc Park by George Hammond Whalley MP. However following his death in 1878 Druids lost the use of the Plasmadoc Ground. Because of this, Druids were forced to withdraw from the 1878–79 edition of the Welsh Cup. This resulted in the club folding and many players, including Kenrick, leaving the club. The club briefly folded and did not play any further games until November 1879.

Salvation was found in the form of the Williams-Wynn family as they allowed the club to use an area of the Wynnstay Estate, which became Wynnstay Park and home to the Druids for the next forty years.

With their new home Druids once again entered the Welsh Cup and the 1879–80 edition saw the start of an era of success for the Ruabon Club. Druids reached the Welsh Cup final seven consecutive times between 1879 and 1886 winning the trophy five times. Druids also had some success in the FA Cup reaching the Fifth Round (last eight) in 1882–83 and the Fourth Round in 1884–85.

After seven years of success in Welsh football Druids would begin to suffer with the advent of professionalism. Druids failed to reach further than the Second Round in the Welsh Cup until the 1892–93 season. The earlier success in the FA Cup was also not to be matched as after 1887–88 they did not progress to the First Round proper again.

In September 1888 at a meeting at the Wynnstay Arms, the club was re-formed when they merged with neighbours Ruabon Wanderers. It was decided to retain the name Druids as it was a well-known title. A follow-up meeting was held at the Bricklayers Arms, Ruabon where the committee was selected. Llewelyn Kenrick was present at this meeting.

In 1897–98 season Druids joined The Combination and remained there until 1899–1900 season, finishing fourth in 1898–99 and third in 1899–1900. The 1897–98 season also saw Druids win the Welsh Cup for the Sixth time. More Welsh Cup success followed the following year, followed by two Runners-up spots in 1899–1900 and 1900–01. More silver ware would follow in the form of the Welsh Amateur Cup in 1902–03 and the Welsh Cup again for the Eighth and final time in 1903–04.

By now the Wynnstay Park Ground was fast becoming unsuitable and as the Estate would not allow improvement on the site, Druids began to suffer financially. With the outbreak of World War I in 1914 football in the country ceased until 1920, which in lue prevented Druids from becoming nothing more than a foot-note in the History of Welsh football. After the War Druids left Wynnstay Park and combined with Rhosymedre F.C. to form Rhosymedre Druids F.C. who played on the Church Field in Rhosymedre.^{[a]}

Despite this new pairing, Druids still faced financial trouble and amalgamated once more in August 1927 with Acrefair United F.C. to form a new club Druids United.

Druids United F.C. continued to play their trade in the area and they too amalgamated, with Cefn Albion F.C. in 1992 to form Cefn Druids F.C., who still carry on the name and success of the old club as Cefn Druids in the Welsh Premier League.

== League history ==
For a full history see; List of football seasons involving Cefn Druids and its predecessor clubs

Season	Club	League									Cup			
Season	Club	Division	P	W	D	L	GF	GA	Pts	Pos	Welsh Cup	FA Cup	Welsh Amateur Cup	Other
1876-77	Druids											Withdrew		
1877-78	Druids										RU	3R		
1878-79	Druids										Withdrew			
1879-80	Druids										W			
1880-81	Druids										W			
1881-82	Druids										W			
1882-83	Druids										RU	QF		
1883-84	Druids										RU			
1884-85	Druids										W	4R		
1885-86	Druids										W			
1886-87	Druids										2R			
1887-88	Druids										2R			
1888-89	Druids										1R			
1889-90	Druids										2R			
1890–91	Druids	Welsh Senior League	10	7	1	2	45	14	13*	1	1R			
1892–93	Druids	Welsh Senior League	14	9	3	2	46	21	21	1			SF	
1893–94	Druids	Welsh Senior League	14	10	2	2	59	19	22	2	SF		1R	
1894–95	Druids	Welsh Senior League	15	7	4	4	50	32	18	3			2R	
1895–96	Druids	Welsh Senior League	12	4	5	3	26	22	13	3	1R		1R	
1896–97	Druids	Welsh Senior League	14	10	3	1	49	19	23	1		4QR	2R	
1897–98	Druids	The Combination	24	9	3	12	43	46	21	10	W		2R	
1898–99	Druids	The Combination	28	16	1	11	64	31	33	4	W		3R	
1899–1900	Druids	The Combination	16	9	3	4	38	28	21	3	RU		3R	
1900–01	Druids	Birmingham & District League	34	11	9	14	61	62	31	12	RU	1QR	1R	
1901–02	Druids	Birmingham & District League	34	12	4	18	54	82	28	13			4R	
1902–03	Druids	Birmingham & District League	34	13	5	16	48	58	31	11	SF		W	
1903–04	Druids	Birmingham & District League	34	10	4	20	63	78	24	16	W		RU	
1904–05	Druids	The Combination	26	7	5	14	29	54	19	13			4R	
1905–06	Druids	The Combination	28	14	5	9	52	46	33	4			2R	
1906–07	Druids	The Combination	26	6	6	14	29	70	18	13				
1907–08	Druids	The Combination	26	9	5	12	53	58	23	8			PR	
1908–09	Druids	The Combination	30	10	4	16	51	74	24	14			2R	
1909–10	Druids	The Combination	30	7	3	20	44	83	17	14			2PR	
1910–11	Druids	Liverpool County Combination Division 1	24	6	5	13	30	48	17	11			PR	
1911–12	Druids	Wrexham & District League Division 1	14	4	2	8	18	27	10	7				
1912–13	Ruabon Druids	North Wales Alliance League	26	7	2	17	39	80	16	12				
1913-14		No record of club playing in any League									2PR			
1914-15		No record of club entering any competitions												
1915-1919		No Football played due to World War I												
1919-20	Rhosymedre	North Wales Alliance League Division 1	26	16	2	8	66	35	34	4				
1920-21	Rhosymedre	North Wales Alliance League Division 1	29	19	3	4	76	20	41	1				
1921-22	Rhosymedre Druids										3PR			
1922-23	Rhosymedre Druids													
1923-24		Merged with Acrefair United to form Druids United												

== International players ==
Several Druids players have represented Wales in international matches, who are listed below, with the number of caps won whilst with Druids and the total caps in parentheses:

- Harry Adams (2) (4)
- Edward Bowen (2) (2)
- William Butler (2) (2)
- Knyvett Crosse (3) (3)
- Arthur Davies (1) (2)
- John Price Davies (2) (2)
- Robert Davies (1) (1)
- Thomas Davies (4) (4)
- Jack Doughty (1) (8)
- Daniel Grey (2) (2)
- Reuben Humphreys (1) (1)
- John Jones (1) (1)
- Ralph Jones (1) (1)
- Robert Albert Jones (4) (4)
- Samuel Jones (1) (6)
- William P. Jones (2) (4)
- Llewelyn Kenrick (3) (5)
- Charles Ketley (1) (1)
- Richard Morris (2) (11)
- Jack Powell (9) (15)
- George Richards (3) (6)
- Robert Roberts (1) (9)
- Charles Thomas (2) (2)
- David Thomson (1) (1)
- George Thomson (2) (2)
- Jim Vaughan (4) (4)
- John Vaughan (9) (11)
- Ephraim Williams (5) (5)
- William Williams (9) (11)

For further details of their international careers, see List of Wales international footballers

== Honours ==
=== League ===
- Welsh Senior League
  - 1890–91, 1892–93, 1896–97

=== Cup ===
- Welsh Cup
  - 1879–80, 1880–81, 1881–82, 1884–85, 1885–86, 1897–98, 1898–99, 1903–04
- Welsh Amateur Cup
  - 1902–03

== See also ==
- Druids United F.C.
- Cefn Albion F.C.
- Cefn Druids A.F.C.

== Notes ==
1. ^{a} Church Field, Rhosymedre was home at one point to the original Druids F.C. as well as the preceding club Druids United and Cefn Albion. Cefn Druids, who were formed by the amalgamation Druids United and Cefn Albion, play in a newly built stadium in Rhosymedre called The Rock/Rhosymedre Stadium. This new stadium is mere metres away from Church Field.
