= Jim Vaughan =

Welsh footballer

Personal information
- Date of birth: 1868
- Place of birth: Wales

Senior career*
Years	Team	Apps	(Gls)
1891-1900	Druids		
1900-	Chirk		

International career
1893–1899	Wales	4	(0)
- * Club domestic league appearances and goals

Jim Vaughan (born 1868) was a Welsh international footballer. He was part of the Wales national football team between 1893 and 1899, playing 4 matches. He played his first match on 13 March 1893 against England and his last match on 20 March 1899 against England. At club level, he played for Druids. In September 1900 he joined Chirk.

== See also ==
- List of Wales international footballers (alphabetical)
