= Charles Ketley =

Welsh footballer

Personal information
- Full name: Charles Napier Ketley
- Date of birth: 11 September 1856
- Place of birth: Wrexham, Wales
- Date of death: 23 September 1934 (aged 78)
- Place of death: Syracuse, New York, US
- Position: Left wing

Senior career*
Years	Team	Apps	(Gls)
1876–1885	Druids		

International career
1882	Wales	1	(0)
- * Club domestic league appearances and goals

Charles Ketley (born 1856) was a Welsh international footballer. He was part of the Wales national football team, playing 1 match on 25 February 1882 against Ireland.

Ketley emigrated to the United States where he died in 1934.

== See also ==
- List of Wales international footballers (alphabetical)
