= John Vaughan (footballer, born 1856) =

Welsh footballer (1856–1935)

Personal information
- Date of birth: 1856
- Place of birth: Wales
- Date of death: 1935 (aged 78–79)

Senior career*
Years	Team	Apps	(Gls)
- Druids

International career
1879–1884	Wales	11	(2)
- * Club domestic league appearances and goals

John Vaughan (1856 – 1935) was a Welsh international footballer. He was part of the Wales national football team between 1879 and 1884, playing 11 matches and scoring 2 goals. He played his first match on 7 April 1879 against Scotland and his last match on 17 March 1884 against England. At club level, he played for Druids.

== See also ==
- List of Wales international footballers (alphabetical)
