= Llewelyn Kenrick =

Welsh solicitor and football administrator

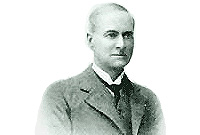
- Born: 9 June 1847; Ruabon, Denbighshire, Wales
- Died: 29 May 1933 (aged 85); Ruabon, Denbighshire, Wales
- Occupation: Solicitor
- Known for: Founded Football Association of Wales

Samuel Llewelyn Kenrick (9 June 1847 – 29 May 1933) was a Welsh solicitor who became the founder of the Football Association of Wales and organised the first Welsh international football match against Scotland in 1876. As such he became the "father of Welsh football".

== Early life and family ==
Wynn Hall, Kenrick's family home

Kenrick was born into the land-owning, industrialist Kenrick dynasty of Wynn Hall, Ruabon, Wales, the son of William Kenrick (1798–1865) who had founded the Wynn Hall Colliery, and a descendant of the Wynn family. After attending Ruabon Grammar School, Kenrick trained as a solicitor (admitted 1871) and practised at Ruabon.

Two of his cousins, Harriet and Florence Kenrick, were the first and second wives of the politician Joseph Chamberlain.

In 1909 Kenrick married Lillian Maud, daughter of the Rev. A. L. Taylor, headmaster of Ruabon Grammar School, although they had no children.

== Football career ==
His earliest football appearances were in England when he played for Priorslee at Shifnal, Shropshire.

=== Druids Football Club ===
In 1872, he assisted brothers David and George Thomson in amalgamating the Ruabon-based, Plasmadoc club with two other Ruabon clubs, "Ruabon Rovers" and "Ruabon Volunteers", to form the Ruabon Druids. The newly created club played their home matches at Plasmadoc Park in the village of Rhosymedre, before a new ground was created in the nearby Wynn family estate at Wynnstay in 1879. At this time, there was no organised league system and Druids played friendly matches against other local clubs although they occasionally ventured further afield to play in England and Scotland, including a match against Queens Park at Hampden Park in 1877.

=== Shropshire Wanderers ===
Kenrick also played for the Shropshire Wanderers in the 1874–75 season in which he helped them reach the semi-final of the FA Cup, when they were defeated 1–0 by the Old Etonians.

== First international match ==
In January 1876, a London-based Welshman, G. Clay-Thomas, placed an advertisement in The Field newspaper proposing that a Welsh team be formed to play Scotland or Ireland at rugby. Kenrick saw the advertisement but decided that the international match should be Association football.

He told The Field that the footballers of North Wales accepted the challenge and he advertised for players:

Test matches will take place at the ground of the Denbighshire County Cricket Club at Wrexham for the purpose of choosing the Cambrian Eleven. Gentlemen desirous of playing are requested to send in their names and addresses.

To be selected, the players had to be born in Wales or have sufficient residence in the Principality. Although Kenrick corresponded with several Welsh clubs and the Universities in order to raise a team he was criticised for allegedly overlooking players from the south.

The test matches took place in February 1876 under the auspices of the newly created Football Association of Wales (see below). Kenrick selected six players from his own club, Druids, plus two from local rivals, Wrexham, and one from English club, Oswestry. William Evans (of Oxford University) was the only player from South Wales selected, with the others all from North Wales, other than John Hawley Edwards who was born in Shrewsbury in England and had previously represented the England national football team. Edwards was a fellow solicitor and member of the Shropshire Wanderers.

The match against Scotland was played at Hamilton Crescent, Partick, the home of the West of Scotland Cricket Club on 25 March 1876. The Welsh were well defeated, conceding four goals without reply. Kenrick played at left back and acquitted himself well, with the match report commenting: "Evans and Kenrick, the backs, played splendidly for Wales".

== Football Association of Wales ==
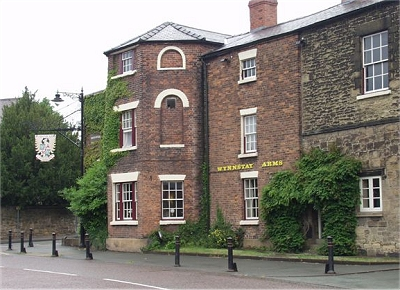
The Wynnstay Arms Hotel, Ruabon.

Provisionally known as the "Cambrian Football Association", the Football Association of Wales was founded at a meeting held on 2 February 1876 at the Wynnstay Arms Hotel in Wrexham, initially to formalise the arrangements for the forthcoming match against Scotland.

In May 1876, a further meeting was called, this time in the ballroom of the identically named Wynnstay Arms Hotel in Ruabon where the name was agreed as the "Football Association of Wales" and the constitution was drawn up. The arguments and discussions continued so long that the local policeman came in to call time.

Sadly we have no record of the words actually used by the police constable as he stood sternly surveying the scene in the Wynnstay Arms, Ruabon, on that May night in 1876; but what they amounted to was that even if the gentlemen were busy forming the Football Association of Wales it was past closing time so would they mind forming it somewhere else…

Fortunately, Sir Watkin Williams-Wynn was in attendance; as the local JP (and also the sitting Member of Parliament), he went next door, opened the Court, extended the hotel's licensing hours, thus enabling the meeting to continue. The meeting ended with Kenrick appointed as the first chairman and honorary secretary with John Hawley Edwards as first treasurer.

Kenrick continued to serve the FAW until 1884, when he left, probably because of the trend towards professionalism. In 1897, when the FAW secretary was charged with fraud, Kenrick returned to guide the association through the crisis. He made the final break a few months later over the minor issue of the allocation of gate money to Welsh Cup semi-finalists and finalists.

== The Welsh Cup ==
In 1877, the FAW inaugurated the first Welsh domestic football competition, the Welsh Cup, which kicked off in the autumn. 19 clubs entered though only 17 actually fielded a team. The first match was played on Saturday 13 October at Newtown against the Druids and ended in a 1–1 draw. The game started at 2.30 in front of a large crowd with the high wind causing problems. Evans scored for Newtown in the first half, although Druids equalised through Daniel Grey to take the match to a replay. The match report says that "Ll. Kendrick (was) prominent for Druids."

Druids won the replay 4–0 and progressed to the final against Wrexham. The match was a cliffhanger, with no score until the Wrexham forwards charged the Druids' defenders to take the ball over the line to win the game in the final minute, with James Davies being credited with the goal.

Following the loss of their Plasmadoc ground in the autumn of 1878, Druids were temporarily disbanded. During this period, Kenrick first played one game for Wrexham however decided not to join them and instead Kenrick and several of his Druids team-mates joined the Oswestry club. In 1879, the Druids had gained the use of the ground at Wynnstay and Kenrick returned to the Druids for one further season as captain, leading them to the Welsh Cup Final when they defeated Ruthin 2–1 (with goals from Jack Vaughan and John Jones). As captain of the Druids, Kenrick collected the cup from Sir Evan Morris, who acclaimed him as the founder of Welsh football.

== Later international career ==
The return match against Scotland came on 5 March 1877 at the Racecourse Ground, Wrexham, with Kenrick retaining his place at left-back. The Scots were again victorious, winning 2–0. The match report in the Wrexham Advertiser stated:

Both teams played remarkably well and the contest throughout was an exceedingly close one. The Scotchmen exhibiting the utmost proficiency in the essential art of passing while the home team worked admirably, the "Backs" exhibiting some really excellent play. It was noticeable that the Scotch forwards were not ambitious of doing the work of the back players and this was in contrast to the Welsh team. Had the Cymry forwards played well up in the first half several goals would have been scored in their favour, but they would persist in following the ball up and down the ground.

Kenrick missed the 1878 match against Scotland (lost 9–0) but returned to the side the following year for matches against England and Scotland. Described as "a small, muscular player and a full-back with a reputation as a fearsome shoulder-charger", Kenrick had retired from playing and was attending the match against England at Alexandra Meadows, Blackburn on 26 February 1881 as a spectator. Jack Powell missed his train connection at Chester and Kenrick turned out in his everyday clothes to give "a splendid performance" at right-back. Some years later, William Pierce Owen recalled the match at Blackburn:

It was snowing and hailing and we had been playing for some time, when I saw what I thought was a spectator breaking into the field and making a violent attack upon Marshall and Rostron, the English right wing. Upon closer inspection I found it was Llewelyn Kenrick of Ruabon. He was dressed in long tweed trousers, wore ordinary boots and sported a smart Oxford shirt. He played with the utmost vigour until unfortunately his knee gave way and once more Wales had only ten men on the field.

According to the Wrexham Advertiser:

(John) Hawtrey, the English goalkeeper, threw the ball out but was charged over at the same time and (Jack) Vaughan running up placed the leather safely through the goal for Wales. The Englishmen strove hard to get on terms with their opponents. Shot after shot was aimed at the Welsh goal but each attempt was rendered futile. When time was called Wales were declared winners by one goal to love.

This was the first victory by the Welsh international side, five years after their first international match.

== Legal career ==
Kenrick was Clerk to the Ruabon Magistrates from 1896 and was appointed coroner for East Denbighshire in 1906, a post he held until his death in 1933.

Shortly after his appointment, he presided over an inquest into the death of a footballer at Chirk and, after amusing himself with a remark that the jury probably knew more about the game than he did, made the following comment on the game:

Football was one of the best pastimes which young men could engage in and within reasonable limits and provided that it was indulged in simply as a pastime only. It was far better for a young man to take part in football, cricket or any other healthful experience in the fresh air than to be hanging around billiard tables and public houses in an atmosphere meeting with tobacco smoke and the smell of intoxicating liquor.

One writer who knew Kenrick well described him as "thoroughly straightforward and conscientious. He has never been the man to court favour and popularity. His somewhat brusque manner perhaps offended many, but no one ever doubted his sincerity."

== International appearances ==
Kenrick made five appearances for Wales as follows:

| Date | Venue | Opponent | Result | Goals | Competition |
|---|---|---|---|---|---|
| 25 March 1876 | Hamilton Crescent, Partick | Scotland | 0–4 | 0 | Friendly |
| 5 March 1877 | Racecourse Ground, Wrexham | Scotland | 0–2 | 0 | Friendly |
| 18 January 1879 | Kennington Oval, London | England | 1–2 | 0 | Friendly |
| 7 April 1879 | Racecourse Ground, Wrexham | Scotland | 0–3 | 0 | Friendly |
| 26 February 1881 | Alexandra Meadows, Blackburn | England | 1–0 | 0 | Friendly |

== Death ==
Kenrick died on 29 May 1933 in Ruabon at the age of 85, and was buried at Ruabon Cemetery.
