= George Thomson (footballer, born 1854) =

Wales international footballer (1853-1937)

George Frederick Thomson
Personal information
- Date of birth: 1853
- Place of birth: Dudley, England
- Date of death: 15 May 1937 (aged 82–83)
- Place of death: Cheltenham, England
- Position: Left wing

Senior career*
Years	Team	Apps	(Gls)
1869–1872	Plasmadoc		
1872–1880	Druids FC		

International career
1876–1877	Wales	2	(0)
Relatives	David Thomson (brother)
- * Club domestic league appearances and goals

George Frederick Thomson (baptized 28 September 1853 – 15 May 1937) was a Welsh amateur footballer who helped found the Druids club and played for Wales in their first two international matches.

== Early life and family ==
Thomson was born in Dudley in Staffordshire, England, and baptized at nearby Halesowen, Worcestershire. He moved across the border into Wales as a child when his family settled in the Ruabon area of Denbighshire, together with his older brother David. Thomson worked as a timber merchant but later assisted his father, who was the manager of the New British Iron Works situated in the Wynnstay district of Ruabon.

== Football career ==
When only aged 15, Thomson (together with his brother) helped form the Plasmadoc club in 1869 which in 1872 amalgamated with two other Ruabon clubs, "Ruabon Rovers" and "Ruabon Volunteers", and under the guidance of Llewelyn Kenrick became Ruabon Druids. All three played a prominent role in the foundation of the Football Association of Wales in early 1876, with George being a member of the original committee of the Association.

In February 1876, Kenrick organized trial matches to select Welsh players to represent their country in a match against Scotland. The international match was played at Hamilton Crescent, Partick, the home of the West of Scotland Cricket Club on 25 March 1876, with Thomson playing as a central forward in a 2–2–6 formation. The Welsh were well defeated, conceding four goals without reply.

The return match came on 5 March 1877 at the Racecourse Ground, Wrexham, with Thomson playing on the left-wing. The Scots were again victorious, winning 2–0.

In 1877–78, Thomson, described as "a hard-working forward whose forte was running with the ball but (who) was none too accurate in his shooting", helped Druids reach the first Welsh Cup final on 30 March 1878, losing 1–0 to local rivals Wrexham.

He also played in inter-county matches for Denbighshire.

== Later career ==
Thomson retired from playing football in 1880, but remained active with Wynnstay cricket club. He had also been a county cricketer for Shropshire, while playing at club level for Oswestry and Whitchurch, between 1872 and 1878.

When the iron company went into liquidation in about 1887, Thomson left Ruabon to settle in Cheltenham where he died in 1937 aged 83.

== Honours ==
Druids

- Welsh Cup runners-up: 1878
