= North Wales Alliance League =

Defunct Welsh association football league

- Founded: 1912; 114 years ago
- First season: 1912–13
- Folded: 1921; 105 years ago
- Country: Wales
- Domestic cup(s): Welsh Cup; Welsh Amateur Cup
- Last champions: Rhosymedre (1920–21) (1920-21)

The North Wales Alliance League was a football league in Wales. It was made up of teams from Wrexham County Borough, Flintshire and Denbighshire.

== History ==
The North Wales Alliance League ran during the early years of the twentieth century from 1912 to 1921.

At that time the senior clubs in the Wrexham area played in English leagues such as The Combination and the Birmingham & District League.

Clubs from the Wrexham area, and the rest of North Wales, joined the Welsh National League (North) which ran from 1921 to 1930.

== Divisional Champions ==
Season	Division One	Division Two
1912–13	Gwersyllt	
1913–14	Gwersyllt	
No competitive football was played between 1915 and 1919 due to the First World War.
1919–20	Rhos Athletic	Johnstown
1920–21	Rhosymedre	Broughton DS & S

== See also ==
- Football in Wales
- Welsh football league system
- Welsh Cup
- List of football clubs in Wales
