= David Thomson (footballer, born 1847) =

English-born Welsh footballer

Personal information
- Date of birth: 1847
- Place of birth: Dudley, England
- Date of death: 14 September 1876 (aged 28–29)
- Place of death: Ruabon, Wales
- Position: Goalkeeper

Senior career*
Years	Team	Apps	(Gls)
1872–1873	Ruabon Rovers		
1872–1876	Plasmadoc		
- Shropshire Wanderers
1876	Druids FC		

International career
1876	Wales	1	(0)
Relatives	George Thomson (brother)
- * Club domestic league appearances and goals

David Thomson (baptized 5 November 1847 – 14 September 1876) was an England-born Welsh amateur footballer who helped found the Druids club and played for Wales in their first international match. He has been described as "one of the pioneers of Welsh football".

== Early life and family ==
Thomson was born in Dudley in Staffordshire, England, and baptized at nearby Halesowen in Worcestershire. He moved across the border into Wales as a child when his family settled in the area of Ruabon, Denbighshire, together with his younger brother George. Thomson enlisted in the Royal Denbighshire Militia, reaching the rank of captain.

Thomson was also an excellent cricketer with Wynnstay C.C. He was also a county cricketer for Staffordshire and, between 1871 and 1875, for Shropshire while playing for Hawkstone C.C. For the latter county he made in ten matches a total 341 runs, with a best match score of 79, and took 11 wickets.

== Football career ==
In 1869, Thomson (assisted by his younger brother) helped form the Plasmadoc club which in 1872 amalgamated with two other Ruabon clubs, "Ruabon Rovers" and "Ruabon Volunteers", and under the guidance of Llewelyn Kenrick became Ruabon Druids. Thomson became the first president of the amalgamated club. All three played a prominent role in the foundation of the Football Association of Wales in early 1876, with David attending the first meeting of the Association, when they agreed to adopt the Football Association rules. Thomson was also a member of the Shropshire Wanderers club.

In February 1876, Kenrick organized trial matches to select Welsh players to represent their country in a match against Scotland. The international match was played at Hamilton Crescent, Partick, the home of the West of Scotland Cricket Club on 25 March 1876, with Thomson playing as a goalkeeper. The Welsh were well defeated, conceding four goals without reply. Thomson had a tough international baptism with at least one of the Scots goals coming when Thomson and the ball were charged over the line.

Thomson died suddenly in September 1876, in his late 20s. As a mark of respect, the Druids players wore black armbands throughout the 1876–77 season.
