= Ruabon F.C. =

Ruabon
- Full name: Ruabon Football Club
- Founded: 25 September 1873
- Dissolved: 1879
- Ground: Vicarage Field; Ruabon; Wrexham
Home colours

Ruabon F.C. were a football club based in the village of Ruabon near Wrexham, Wales.

== History ==
The club was founded on Thursday 25 September 1873 during a meeting at Ruabon National School. During the meeting Eban Edwards was selected as captain, and J.E. Davies as treasurer. Also present at the meeting was Llewelyn Kenrick, later of Druids FC and founder of the Football Association of Wales.

The club played its first match on Saturday 4 October at Vicarage Fields, an internal match between Edwards and Davies teams.

The club played in the inaugural Welsh Cup competition, losing 1–0 against Newtown White Stars in the first round. The following season, the club contested the Welsh Cup again, going out in the first round again after losing 1–0 against Chirk.

== Cup history ==
Season	Competition	Round	Opposition	Score
1877–78	Welsh Cup	First Round	Newtown White Stars	0–1
1878–79	Welsh Cup	First Round	Chirk	0–1

== Other Info ==
Ruabon F.C. are not to be confused with Ruabon Rovers F.C. who later became Plasmadoc FC and eventually Ruabon Druids F.C. who they should also not be confused with.
