= 1879 Welsh Cup final =

1879 Football Association of Wales Challenge Cup final
- Event: 1878–79 Welsh Cup
| Newtown White Star | Wrexham |
| 1 | 0 |
- Date: 29 March 1879
- Venue: Cricket Field, Oswestry
- Referee: A.E. Daniel (Birmingham)
- Attendance: 2,500

The 1879 Welsh Cup final, was the second in the competition. It was contested by Newtown White Star and Wrexham at the Cricket Field, Oswestry.

== Route to the Final ==
=== Newtown White Star ===
| Round | Opposition | Score | Location |
|---|---|---|---|
| 1st | All Saints (A) | 2–0 | Shrewsbury |
| 2nd | Llangollen (A) | 1–0 | Llangollen |
| 3rd | Bangor (N) | 2–2 | Wrexham |
| 3rd | Bangor (N) | A–A | Chester |
| SF | Newtown (N) | 1–1 | Oswestry |
| SF | Newtown (A) | 3–1 | Newtown |

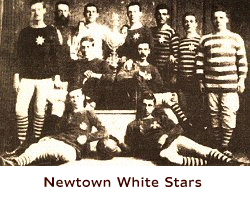
Newtown White Star, Welsh Cup winners 1878/79

=== Wrexham ===
| Round | Opposition | Score | Location |
|---|---|---|---|
| 1st | Corwen (A) | 2-0 | Corwen |
| 2nd | Friars School (A) | 3-1 | School Ground, Bangor |
| 3rd | Bye | | |
| SF | Oswestry United | 2-0 | Salisbury Park, Wrexham |

== Final ==
29 March 1879
16:00

| Newtown White Star | 1 – 0 | Wrexham |
|---|---|---|
| E Rees 60' |

Cricket Field, Oswestry
Attendance: 2,500
Referee: A E Daniel (Birmingham)

| Newtown White Star | Wrexham |

| GK | (England) George Montford |
| FB | (Wales) James Davies |
| FB | (Wales) T. Jones |
| HB | (Wales) E.H. Morgan |
| HB | (Wales) T. Pryce |
| RW | (Wales) George Woosnam |
| RW | (Wales) W. Andrew |
| LW | (Wales) S. Davies |
| LW | (Wales) D. Rees |
| CF | (Wales) E. Gittins (c) |
| CF | (Wales) George Thomas |

| GK | (Wales) J. Davies |
| FB | (England) Charles Murless (c) |
| FB | (Wales) T.W. Davies |
| HB | (Wales) F. Owen |
| HB | (Wales) Charles Edwards |
| HB | (Wales) Edwin Alfred Cross |
| RW | (Wales) Thomas Boden |
| RW | (Wales) James Lloyd |
| LW | (England) Henry Loxham |
| LW | (Wales) E. Evans |
| CF | (Wales) John Price |

Assistant referees:

- Mr J.P. Davies (Corwen)
- Mr R. Hamer (Oswestry)
