= 1878 Welsh Cup final =

1878 Football Association of Wales Challenge Cup final
- Event: 1877–78 Welsh Cup
Wrexham	Druids
1	0
- Date: 30 March 1878
- Venue: Acton Park, Wrexham
- Referee: J.W. Thomas (Stoke)
- Attendance: 1,500

The 1878 Welsh Cup final, was the first in the competition. It was contested by Wrexham and Druids at the Acton Park, Wrexham.

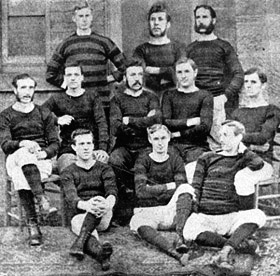
The Wrexham team which won the first Welsh Cup in 1878. The team are pictured without the trophy, as it was not ready until a year later.

== Route to the final ==
=== Wrexham ===
Round	Opposition	Score	Location
1st	Civil Service (Wrexham) (H)	3-1	The Racecourse, Wrexham
2nd	Oswestry United (H)	1-1	The Racecourse, Wrexham
2nd	Oswestry United (A)	2-0	Cricket Field, Oswestry
3rd	Gwersyllt Foresters (A)	8-0	Stansty Park, Wrexham
SF	Bye		

=== Druids ===
Round	Opposition	Score	Location
1st	Newtown (A)	1-1	
1st	Newtown (H)	4-0	Plas Madoc
2nd	Rhosllanerchrugog (H)	3-0	Plas Madoc
3rd	Newtown White Stars (H)	1-1	Plas Madoc
3rd	Newtown White Stars (A)	1-1	
3rd	Newtown White Stars (N)	3-0	Cricket Field, Oswestry
SF	Bangor (N)	0-0	The Racecourse, Wrexham
SF	Bangor (N)	1-0	Rhyl

== Final ==
The final of the inaugural Welsh Cup tournament was played at Acton Park, Wrexham on 30 March 1878 between Wrexham and Druids of Ruabon. The pitch was donated by Sir R. A. Cunliffe, and was a roped off portion of land measuring 120 yards by 76. Entrance was gained via Rhosnessney Lodge with sixpence being charged for admission. The match was a cliffhanger, with no score until the Wrexham forwards charged the Druids' defenders to take the ball over the line to win the game in the final minute, with James Davies being credited with the goal.

30 March 1878
16:00

Wrexham	1 – 0	Druids
James Davies 90'

Acton Park, Wrexham
Attendance: 1,500
Referee: Mr J.W. Thomas (Stoke)

Wrexham	Druids

GK	(Wales) Edward Phennah
RB	(Wales) Charles Murless
LB	(Wales) T. W. Davies
RH	(Wales) E. Evans, sen.
CH	(Wales) Edwin Alfred Cross
LH	(Wales) Alfred Davies
OR	(Wales) Charles Edwards
IR	(Wales) James Davies
CF	(Wales) John Price
IL	(England) Henry Loxham
OL	(Wales) E. Evans

GK	(Wales) E. Roberts
RB	(Wales) Jack Powell
LB	(Wales) Llewelyn Kenrick
CH	(Wales) H. Morris
CH	(Wales) William Williams
OR	(Wales) Edward Bowen
IR	(Wales) Charles Ketley
CF	(Wales) George Frederick Thompson
CF	(Wales) Dr. Daniel Grey
IL	(Wales) E. Vaughan
OL	(Wales) John Jones

Assistant referees:

- Mr J.M. Morris (Shrewsbury)
- Mr T. Hingle (Darwen)
