= 1881 Welsh Cup final =

1881 Football Association of Wales Challenge Cup final
- Event: 1880–81 Welsh Cup
| Druids | Newtown White Star |
| 2 | 0 |
- Date: 26 March 1881
- Venue: Racecourse Ground, Wrexham
- Referee: Mr S.G. Crump (Stafford Road, Wolverhampton)
- Attendance: 4,000

The 1881 Welsh Cup final, was the fourth in the football competition. It was contested by Druids and Newtown White Star at the Racecourse Ground, Wrexham.

== Route to the Final ==
=== Druids ===
| Round | Opposition | Score | Location |
|---|---|---|---|
| 1st | Llangollen (H) | 3-1 | Wynnstay Park, Ruabon |
| 2nd | Ruthin (A) | 1-1 | |
| 3rd | Aberystwyth (H) | 6-0 | |
| SF | Northwich Victoria (N) | 3-0 | The Racecourse, Wrexham |

=== Newtown White Star ===
| Round | Opposition | Score | Location |
|---|---|---|---|
| 1st | Shrewsbury Engineers | 1-0 | Shrewsbury |
| 1st (R) | Shrewsbury Engineers | 0-0 | The Racecourse, Wrexham |
| 1st (R2) | Shrewsbury Engineers | 1-0 | Newtown |
| 2nd | Wrexham (N) | 2-1 | Rhosddu Recreation Ground, Wrexham |
| 3rd | Bye | | |
| SF | Llanidloes | 2-0 | Rhosddu Recreation Ground, Wrexham |

== Final ==
26 March 1881
15:55

| Druids | 2 – 0 | Newtown White Star |
|---|---|---|
| J Vaughan 27' 72' |

Racecourse Ground, Wrexham
Attendance: 4,000
Referee: C Crump (Wolverhampton)

| Druids | Newtown White Star |

| GK | (Wales) B. Roberts |
| FB | (Wales) Jack Powell (c) |
| FB | (Wales) A. Powell |
| HB | (Wales) William Williams |
| HB | (Wales) J. Bowen |
| RW | (Wales) Dennis Heywood |
| RW | (Wales) James Lloyd |
| LW | (Wales) John Vaughan |
| LW | (Wales) Jack Jones |
| CF | (Wales) W. Smith |
| CF | (Wales) Charles Ketley |

| GK | (Wales) Harry Hibbott |
| FB | (Wales) D. Owen |
| FB | (Wales) T. Jones |
| HB | (Wales) J. Andrew |
| HB | (Wales) B. Morgan |
| RW | (Wales) W. Andrew |
| RW | (Wales) W. Lewis |
| LW | (Wales) D. Williams (c) |
| LW | (Wales) George Woosnam |
| CF | (Wales) D. Rees |
| CF | (Wales) E. Gittins |

Assistant referees:

- Mr Edward Phennah (Wrexham Civil Service)
- Mr S. Williams (Gwersyllt Foresters)
