= William Williams (footballer, born 1856) =

Welsh footballer

Personal information
- Date of birth: 1856
- Place of birth: Ruabon, Wales
- Position: Half-back

Senior career*
Years	Team	Apps	(Gls)
1874–1878	Druids		
1878–1879	Oswestry		
1879–????	Druids		

International career
1876–1883	Wales	11	(0)
- * Club domestic league appearances and goals

William Williams (born 1856) was a Welsh amateur footballer who played most of his football career with the Druids club of Ruabon. Generally playing at half-back, he made eleven appearances for Wales between 1876 and 1883.

== Football career ==
Williams was born in Ruabon, Denbighshire and was trained as a chimney top maker, working for one of the clay works at Afongoch.

He joined the Druids club in 1874 and in his time with the club, he appeared in eight finals of the Welsh Cup, winning the trophy five times.

In February 1876, he took part in trials organised by the Druids' founder, Llewelyn Kenrick, to select Welsh players to represent their country in a match against Scotland. The match was played at Hamilton Crescent, Partick, the home of the West of Scotland Cricket Club on 25 March 1876, with Williams playing at left-half in a 2–2–6 formation. The Welsh were well defeated, conceding four goals without reply.

Williams was not selected for the return match against Scotland in 1877 and his second international appearance came on 23 March 1878, in a 6–0 defeat by Scotland at the original Hampden Park.

A week later, on 30 March 1878, Druids played in the final of the inaugural Welsh Cup tournament, losing 1–0 to local rivals Wrexham.

Known as "little Billy", Williams became a stalwart of the Druids side, who "could run all day" and "had endless reserves of stamina", although "never a subtle player"; his strong points were his "perfect tackling" and his "vigorous support" of the forwards. In a report on one match, it was said that "he puts a stop to many a dangerous run, he is a most effective player though not one of the fastest. He outlasted all of his contemporaries, continuing to play for the Druids until 1890. He spent the 1878–79 season at Oswestry, when Druids were temporarily without a ground and also made occasional appearances for Bootle, where R A Lythgoe, the former Druids official, was now club secretary.

At international level, he missed only four of the first 15 Welsh international matches and reserved his best performances for matches against Scotland, earning him the nickname of "Scotty".

== International appearances ==
Williams made eleven appearances for Wales in official international matches, as follows:

Date	Venue	Opponent	Result	Goals	Competition
25 March 1876	West of Scotland Cricket Ground, Partick	Scotland	0–4	0	Friendly
23 March 1878	Hampden Park, Glasgow	Scotland	0–9	0	Friendly
18 January 1879	Kennington Oval, London	England	1–2	0	Friendly
17 April 1879	Racecourse Ground, Wrexham	Scotland	0–3	0	Friendly
15 March 1880	Racecourse Ground, Wrexham	England	2–3	0	Friendly
26 February 1881	Alexander Meadows, Blackburn	England	1–0	0	Friendly
14 March 1881	Racecourse Ground, Wrexham	Scotland	1–5	0	Friendly
25 February 1882	Racecourse Ground, Wrexham	Ireland	7–1	0	Friendly
13 March 1882	Racecourse Ground, Wrexham	England	5–3	0	Friendly
25 March 1882	Hampden Park, Glasgow	Scotland	0–5	0	Friendly
17 March 1883	Ulster Cricket Ground, Ballynafeigh	Scotland	1–1	0	Friendly

== Honours ==
Druids

- Welsh Cup winners: 1880, 1881, 1882, 1885, 1886
- Welsh Cup runners-up: 1878, 1883, 1884
