= John Price (footballer, born 1854) =

Welsh footballer

Personal information
- Date of birth: 1854
- Place of birth: Wrexham, Wales
- Date of death: 30 November 1907 (aged 52–53)
- Place of death: Wrexham, Wales
- Position: Centre forward

Senior career*
Years	Team	Apps	(Gls)
- Wrexham Grosvenor
–1877	Civil Service (Wrexham)		
1877–1882	Wrexham	14	(9)

International career
1877–1883	Wales	12	(4)
- * Club domestic league appearances and goals

John Henry Price (1854 – 30 November 1907) was a Welsh footballer who played as a centre forward for Wrexham and made 12 appearances for the Wales national football team between 1877 and 1883, scoring four goals, all of which came in one match.

== Club career ==
Price was born in Wrexham and was employed in a local leather works. He started his football career with Wrexham Grosvenor before joining the local Civil Service club, for whom he played as a full-back.

In 1877, he was persuaded by Charles Murless, the Wrexham captain, to switch allegiance. Murless decided to move Price to play at centre forward where his speed "made him a difficult opponent to stop in front of goal". Price was equally good with his head and his feet and was said "never to have played a foul game". With Price in the forward line, and his ability to bring the wing players into the game, Wrexham were able to move one player to the half-back line, to be one of the first clubs to play a 2–3–5 formation.

In his first season, Wrexham entered the inaugural Welsh Cup tournament. After defeating Price's former club in the first round, they had victories over Oswestry and Gwersyllt Foresters (8–0). With only three teams remaining in the tournament at this stage, Wrexham received a bye to the final, at Acton Park, Wrexham, on 30 March 1878 between Wrexham and Druids from Ruabon. The match was a cliffhanger, with no score until the Wrexham forwards charged the Druids' defenders to take the ball over the line to win the game in the final minute, with James Davies being credited with the goal.

The following season, Wrexham again reached the final of the Welsh Cup, where they lost by a single goal to Newtown White Star.

== International career ==
Price's first international appearance came in Wales' second match against Scotland on 5 March 1877. He then became an automatic choice for the Welsh team over the next five seasons, missing only three of the first fifteen internationals. He thus became the first footballer to make more than ten international appearances.

On 25 February 1882 at the Racecourse, Wrexham, Price scored four goals in the 7–1 victory over Ireland. Price's final appearance for his country came against Ireland on 17 March 1883 by when he had ceased playing for Wrexham.

=== International appearances ===
Price made twelve appearances for Wales in official international matches, as follows:

Date	Venue	Opponent	Result	Goals	Competition
5 March 1877	Racecourse Ground, Wrexham	Scotland	0–2	0	Friendly
23 March 1878	Hampden Park, Glasgow	Scotland	0–9	0	Friendly
18 January 1879	Kennington Oval, London	England	1–2	0	Friendly
15 March 1880	Racecourse Ground, Wrexham	England	2–3	0	Friendly
27 March 1880	Hampden Park, Glasgow	Scotland	1–5	0	Friendly
26 February 1881	Alexandra Meadows, Blackburn	England	1–0	0	Friendly
14 March 1881	Racecourse Ground, Wrexham	Scotland	1–5	0	Friendly
25 February 1882	Racecourse Ground, Wrexham	Ireland	7–1	4	Friendly
13 March 1882	Racecourse Ground, Wrexham	England	5–3	0	Friendly
25 March 1882	Hampden Park, Glasgow	Scotland	0–5	0	Friendly
12 March 1883	Racecourse Ground, Wrexham	Scotland	0–3	0	Friendly
17 March 1883	Ballynafeigh Park, Belfast	Ireland	1–1	0	Friendly

== Honours ==
=== Wrexham ===
- Welsh Cup
  - Winners: 1877–78
  - Runners-up:1878-79
