= John Jones (footballer, born 1856) =

Welsh footballer

Personal information
- Date of birth: 1856
- Place of birth: Wrexham, Wales
- Date of death: 1899 (aged 42–43)
- Place of death: Wrexham, Wales
- Position: Left wing

Senior career*
Years	Team	Apps	(Gls)
1876–1878	Druids		
1878–1879	Oswestry		
1879–1885	Druids		

International career
1877	Wales	1	(0)
- * Club domestic league appearances and goals

John Jones (1856 – 25 April 1899) was a Welsh amateur footballer who spent most of his football career with Druids, and played for the Wales national football team in their first international match in 1876.

== Football career ==
Jones worked as a coal-miner at Gwersyllt, near Wrexham and joined the Druids club, based in his home town of Ruabon, in 1875.

In February 1876, he took part in trials organized by Llewelyn Kenrick (one of the founders of the Druids club) to select Welsh players to represent their country in a match against Scotland. The match was played at Hamilton Crescent, Partick, the home of the West of Scotland Cricket Club on 25 March 1876, with Jones playing on the left wing. The Welsh were well defeated, conceding four goals without reply.

Jones was known throughout North Wales football circles as "Dirty Jack"; this was not in reference to his occupation but to his style of football. In common with many players of the 1880s, he was a "tough and vigorous opponent who gave no quarter".

Druids reached the final of the inaugural Welsh Cup on 30 March 1878, losing 1–0 to local rivals Wrexham.

In 1878, the Druids disbanded temporarily following the loss of their ground at Plasmadoc, with Jones spending a season playing for Oswestry. By 1879, he was back with Druids with the club again reaching the Welsh Cup final, this time emerging victorious against Ruthin 2–1, with Jones scoring Druids' second goal.

Druids were victorious in the Welsh Cup in the next two seasons, defeating Newtown White Star 2–0 in 1881 and Northwich Victoria 5–0 in 1882.

Druids again reached the final in 1883, losing 1–0 to Wrexham. Jones did not feature in the 1884 final, but returned in 1885, now playing in goal as Druids defeated Oswestry White Stars 3–1 in a replay.

== After Football ==
Jones lived on Bridge Street, Ruabon and worked for many years as the chief clerk at the Great Western Railway Station.

== Death ==
John Jones died from side effects of typhoid on 25 April 1899.

== Honours ==
Druids

- Welsh Cup
  - Winners: 1880, 1881, 1882 & 1885
  - Finalists: 1878 & 1883
