= Alfred Davies (footballer) =

Welsh footballer

Personal information
- Date of birth: c. 1850
- Place of birth: Wrexham, Wales
- Date of death: 6 April 1891 (aged 40–41)
- Place of death: Wrexham, Wales
- Position: Half back

Senior career*
Years	Team	Apps	(Gls)
1875–1878	Wrexham	5	(0)

International career
1876–1877	Wales	2	(0)
- * Club domestic league appearances and goals

Alfred Davies (c. 1850 – 6 April 1891) was a Welsh amateur footballer who played most of his football career with Wrexham, with whom he won the inaugural Welsh Cup in 1878. Playing at outside-left, he also made two appearances for Wales in 1876 and 1877.

== Football career ==
Born in Wrexham, Davies was a keen cricketer and a member of the Wrexham Cricket Club. On 28 September 1872, in search of a sporting activity for the winter months, he attended a meeting held at the Turf Hotel in Wrexham, which led to the formation of the Wrexham Association Football Club. In the early days of Wrexham Football Club, the teams would field as many as 16 players with the goal-posts being connected by a tape. At this time, Davies was described as "a robust half-back who backed up the forwards well".

In February 1876, he took part in trials organised by Llewelyn Kenrick to select Welsh players to represent their country in a match against Scotland. The match was played at Hamilton Crescent, Partick, the home of the West of Scotland Cricket Club on 25 March 1876, with Davies playing on the left-wing in a 2–2–6 formation. The Welsh were well defeated, conceding four goals without reply.

The return match came on 5 March 1877 at the Racecourse Ground, Wrexham, with Davies playing on the right; the Scots were again victorious, winning 2–0.

Later that year, he was part of the Wrexham team that entered the inaugural Welsh Cup tournament. After defeating the local Civil Service in the first round, they had victories over Oswestry and Gwersyllt Foresters (8–0). With only three teams remaining in the tournament at this stage, Wrexham received a bye to the final, at Acton Park, Wrexham, on 30 March 1878 between Wrexham and Druids from Ruabon. The match was a cliffhanger, with no score until the Wrexham forwards charged the Druids' defenders to take the ball over the line to win the game in the final minute, with Davies elder brother, James, being credited with the goal.

== Career outside football ==
After retiring from playing football in 1878, Davies continued to play cricket for the Wrexham club, eventually becoming an umpire.

He was a Sunday School teacher and a lieutenant in the Wrexham volunteer fire brigade.

Davies was employed as a stonemason in the family business and died of a chest complaint in April 1891, aged 40.

== Honours ==
=== Wrexham ===
- Welsh Cup
  - Winners: 1877–78
