= Arthur Lea =

Arthur Lea may refer to:

- Arthur Lea (footballer) (1866–1945), Welsh footballer
- Arthur Lea (bishop) (1868–1958), Canadian Anglican bishop
- Arthur Mills Lea (1868–1932), Australian entomologist
