= 1879–80 Welsh Cup =

Tournament details
- Country: Wales

Final positions
- Champions: Druids
- Runners-up: Ruthin

== First round ==
| Wrexham | 1 – 1 | Northwich Victoria | Racecourse Ground; Wrexham |

| Civil Service (Wrexham) | 1 – 1 | Gwersyllt Foresters | Gwersyllt Park; Wrexham |

| Wrexham Albion | 2 – 1 | Wrexham Grosvenor | Rhosddu Recreation Ground; Wrexham |

| Newtown White Star | 3 – 0 | Dolgellau |

| Corwen | 7 – 3 | Bala | Bala |

| Newtown Excelsior | 6 – 0 | All Saints (Salop) |

| Aberystwyth | 1 – 0 | Oswestry |

| Ruthin | 4 – 0 | Llangollen |

Source: Welsh Football Data Archive

=== Replay ===
| Wrexham | 1 – 0 | Northwich Victoria |

| Civil Service (Wrexham) | 0 – 0 | Gwersyllt Foresters |

Source: Welsh Football Data Archive

=== Second replay ===
| 22 November 1879 | Civil Service (Wrexham) | 1 – 2 | Gwersyllt Foresters | Rhosddu Recreation Ground, Wrexham |
| | | | | Referee: Edwin Cross |

Source: Welsh Football Data Archive

Oswestry receive a bye to the next round
Mold scratch to Druids
23rd Royal Welch Fusiliers scratch to Rhyl

== Second round ==
| Rhyl | 1 – 1 | Aberystwyth |

| Newtown Excelsior | 1 – 0 | Wrexham Albion |

| 13 December 1879 | Wrexham | 0 – 1 | Druids | The Racecourse, Wrexham |
| | | | | Referee: Mr Rees, Shrewsbury |

| Newtown White Star | 2 – 0 | Gwersyllt Foresters |

| Ruthin | 3 – 0 | Corwen |

Source: Welsh Football Data Archive

=== Replay ===
| Aberystwyth | 0 – 0 | Rhyl |

Source: Welsh Football Data Archive

=== Second replay ===
| Rhyl | 0 – 3 | Aberystwyth |

Source: Welsh Football Data Archive

== Third round ==
| 10 January 1880 | Druids | 6 – 0 | Aberystwyth | Dolgellau |
| 1:30 | | | | Referee: Mr Owen, Dolgellau |

| 17 January 1880 | Newtown Excelsior | 1 – 1 | Ruthin | Racecourse Ground, Wrexham |
| 2:35 | | | | Referee: Mr H Hainshaw, Wrexham |

Source: Welsh Football Data Archive

=== Replay ===
| Newtown Excelsior | 2 – 4 | Ruthin |

Source: Welsh Football Data Archive

Newtown White Star receive bye to semi final

== Semi-final ==
| 21 February 1880 | Druids | 3 – 1 | Newtown White Star | The Cricket Field; Oswestry |
| 3:55 | | | | Referee: Mr H Dobbs, Oswestry |

Source: Welsh Football Data Archive

Ruthin receive bye to final

== Final ==
13 March 1880
15:30

| Druids | 2 – 1 | Ruthin |
|---|---|---|
| Vaughan, John Jones | | Goodwin |

Racecourse Ground, Wrexham
Attendance: 4,000
Referee: Mr Brooks (Wolverhampton)

| Druids | Ruthin |

== Bibliography ==
- The History of the Welsh Cup 1877-1993 by Ian Garland (1991) ISBN 1-872424-37-6
