= Edwin Cross =

Welsh footballer

Personal information
- Date of birth: c. 1849
- Place of birth: Wrexham, Wales
- Date of death: 19 January 1924 (aged 75–76)
- Place of death: Old Colwyn, Wales
- Position: Half-back

Senior career*
| Years | Team | Apps | (Gls) |
| 1875–1879 | Wrexham | 10 | (0) |

International career
| 1876–1877 | Wales | 2 | (0) |
- * Club domestic league appearances and goals

Edwin Alfred Cross (c. 1849 – 19 January 1924) was a Welsh amateur footballer who played most of his football career with Wrexham, with whom he won the inaugural Welsh Cup in 1878. Playing at half back, he also made two appearances for Wales in 1876 and 1877.

== Football career ==
Born in Wrexham, Cross was a keen cricketer and a member of the Wrexham Cricket Club. On 4 October 1864, in search of a sporting activity for the winter months, he attended a meeting held at the Turf Hotel in Wrexham, which led to the formation of the Wrexham Association Football Club.

Four years later, he attended the inaugural meeting of the Football Association of Wales held at the Wynnstay Arms Hotel, Wrexham on 2 February 1876. He also took part in trials organised by Llewelyn Kenrick to select Welsh players to represent their country in a match against Scotland. The match was played at Hamilton Crescent, Partick, the home of the West of Scotland Cricket Club on 25 March 1876, with Cross playing at right-half in a 2–2–6 formation. The Welsh were well defeated, conceding four goals without reply.

The return match came on 5 March 1877 at the Racecourse Ground, Wrexham, with Cross, described as "an energetic half-back", playing at centre-half; the Scots were again victorious, winning 2–0.

Later that year, he was part of the Wrexham team that entered the inaugural Welsh Cup tournament. After defeating the local Civil Service in the first round, they had victories over Oswestry and Gwersyllt Foresters (8–0). With only three teams remaining in the tournament at this stage, Wrexham received a bye to the final, at Acton Park, Wrexham, on 30 March 1878 between Wrexham and Druids from Ruabon. The match was a cliffhanger, with no score until the Wrexham forwards charged the Druids' defenders to take the ball over the line to win the game in the final minute, with James Davies being credited with the goal.

The following year, Wrexham again reached the final of the Cup, this time losing 1–0 to Newtown White Star.

== Career outside football ==
Cross was employed as a clerk with the Alliance Insurance Company in Wrexham and later in Shrewsbury, before becoming an accountant.

After retiring from playing football in 1879, he continued to play as a leading batsman with Wrexham Cricket Club for several years. He died at Old Colwyn, Denbighshire on 19 January 1924.

His nephew, also E A Cross, was later a director of Wrexham Football Club and an alderman in the town.

== Honours ==
=== Wrexham ===
- Welsh Cup
  - Winners: 1877–78
  - Runners-up:1878-79
