= Harry Hibbott =

Welsh footballer

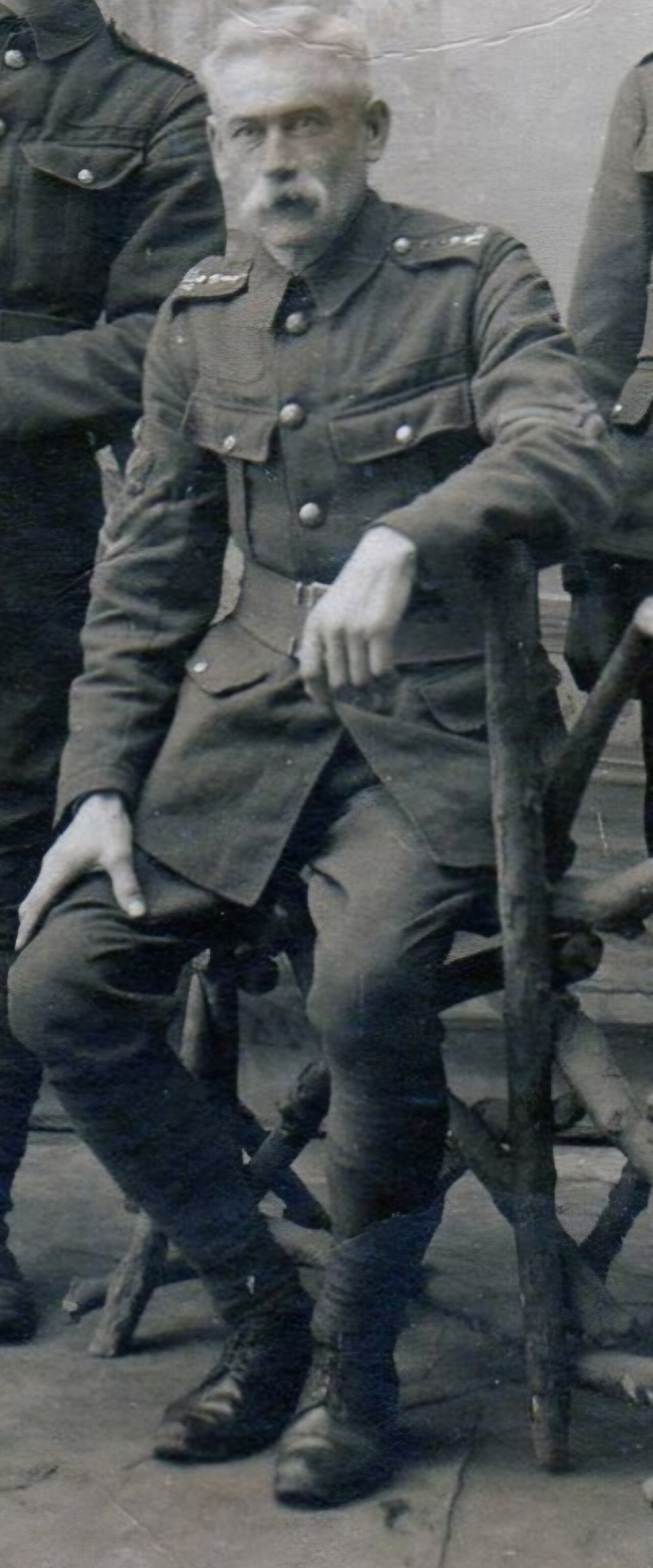
- Hibbott during the First World War

Personal information
- Full name: Henry Hibbott
- Date of birth: July 1859 (Note: Conflicting reports suggest Hibbott was potentially born on 18 July, although it is accepted he was born in July 1859.)
- Place of birth: Llanllwchaiarn, Wales
- Date of death: 4 March 1933 (aged 73)
- Place of death: Newtown, Wales
- Positions: Goalkeeper; centre-forward

Youth career
- 187?–1878: Newtown Amateurs

Senior career*
Years	Team	Apps	(Gls)
1878–1879	Newtown F.C.		
1879–1880	Newtown Excelsior	2+	(0)
1880–1881	White Stars		
1884–1889	Newtown A.F.C.	1+	(0)
Total		3+	(0)

International career^{‡}
1880–1885	Wales	3	(0)
- * Club domestic league appearances and goals as of 1889 ‡ National team caps and goals as of 23 March 1885

Harry Hibbott
- Children: George Hibbott; Robert Hibbott †
- Military career
- Allegiance: United Kingdom
- Branch: British Army
- Service years: 1914–1917
- Rank: Private
- Unit: Royal Welch Fusiliers

Henry "Harry" Hibbott (July 1859 – 4 March 1933) was a Welsh international football goalkeeper who also played as a centre-forward.

== Club career ==
Henry "Harry" Hibbott was born in July 1859 and he began his career with the Newtown Amateurs before breaking into the first team at Newtown F.C. in 1878. During this time, he also played for Newtown Cricket Club.

He then joined Newtown Excelsior in 1880 after Newtown merged with another club. Excelsior dissolved upon the conclusion of the 1879–80 season, and alongside several other former Excelsior players, Hibbott joined White Stars during the 1880–81 season. initially as a centre-forward. He was the starting goalkeeper during the 1881 Welsh Cup final, which White Star finished runners-up.

White Stars was reformed as Newtown in July 1884 and Hibbott joined the club upon its reformation; he would stay with the club until 1889, when he was forced to retire due to a broken leg.

== International career ==
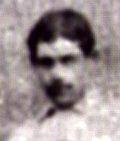
Hibbott with Wales in March 1885

He was part of the Wales national football team between 1880 and 1885, playing 3 matches. He notably represented Wales during the 1884–85 British Home Championship.

He played his first match on 15 March 1880 against England and his last match on 23 March 1885 against Scotland. He became the first player to have been selected by Wales as a goalkeeper and an outfield player.

== Later life ==
After retiring as a footballer, he became a referee and continued to play for Newtown Cricket Club.

He became a sargeant of the 2/7th Royal Welch Fusiliers during the First World War but was removed from active service due to injury in 1917.

Hibbott would then become a funeral director and a carpenter before he died in Newtown on 4 March 1933.

== Personal life ==
Hibbott had four siblings, including his brother William. He also had two sons, George and Robert. They both enlisted in the Royal Welch Fusiliers with their father but Robert was killed in action on 20 May 1917.

His grandson Bobby was also capped by the Wales amateur team between 1949 and 1950.

== Career statistics ==
=== International ===
Appearances and goals by national team and year
National team	Year	Apps	Goals
Wales	1880	2	0
Wales	1885	1	0
Total		3	0

== Honours ==
Wales

- British Home Championship
  - Third place (1): 1884–85

White Stars

- Welsh Cup
  - Runners-up (1): 1880–81

== See also ==
- List of Wales international footballers (alphabetical)
