= Broughton United F.C. =

Former association football club in Wales

Broughton United
- Full name: Broughton United Football Club
- Founded: c. 1899
- Dissolved: 1907; 118 years ago
- Ground: Plas Power
Home colours

Broughton United was a Welsh football club based in New Broughton, Wrexham, Wales. They played their home games at Plas Power.

== History ==
Formed some time in 1899 Broughton United were members of The Combination between 1903 and 1906. They also played in the Welsh Cup on five occasions, reaching the Quarter Finals three times. In 1906 the club withdrew from the Combination due to financial difficulties. Instead the club was due to enter the Wrexham and District League, however they do not appear in the final tables for the 1906–07 season. By 1907 the club were listed as defunct and its committee members were suspended by the Football Association of Wales.

== Colours ==
The club wore maroon jerseys.

== Seasons ==
Season	League	P	W	D	L	GF	GA	Pts	Pos	Teams in League
1900–01	Denbighshire League	13	12	1	0	41	10	25	1	8
1901–02	Denbighshire League	13	10	2	1	44	10	22	1	8
1902–03	Flintshire League First Division									
1903–04	The Combination	24	8	3	13	40	52	19	10	13
1904–05	The Combination	26	14	5	7	43	44	33	3	14
1905–06	The Combination	28	11	2	15	46	61	22	13	15
1906–07	Wrexham and District League									

== Cup history ==
Season	Competition	Round	Opposition	Score	Notes
1899-1900	Welsh Amateur Cup	Round 1	Summerhill Albion		
1899-1900	Welsh Amateur Cup	Round 2	Wrexham Old Boys		
1900–01	Welsh Cup	Round 2	Bye		
1900–01	Welsh Cup	Round 3	Carnarvon Ironopolis	2–1	
1900–01	Welsh Cup	Quarter Final	Chirk	0–4	
1900–01	Denbighshire and Flintshire Charity Cup	Semi Final	Oswestry United	1-1	
1900–01	Denbighshire and Flintshire Charity Cup	Final	Wrexham	1-0	
1901–02	Welsh Cup	Round 2	Chester	w/o	
1901–02	Welsh Cup	Round 3	Welshpool	0–2	
1901–02	Welsh Amateur Cup	Semi Final	Wrexham Victoria	2-2	played at Wynnstay Park, Ruabon
1901–02	Denbighshire and Flintshire Charity Cup	Quarter Final	Druids		result unknown
1901–02	Denbighshire and Flintshire Charity Cup	Semi Final	Rhyl	3–1	
1901–02	Denbighshire and Flintshire Charity Cup	Final	Wrexham	1-5	
1902–03	Welsh Amateur Cup	Round 2	Esclusham White Stars		
1902–03	Welsh Amateur Cup	Round 3	Wrexham Victoria	0–1	
1902–03	Denbighshire and Flintshire Charity Cup	Round 1	Esclusham White Stars		
1902–03	Flintshire League Cup	Final	Flint U.A.C.	1-0	
1903–04	Welsh Cup	Round 3	Wrexham	2–0	
1903–04	Welsh Cup	Quarter Final	Druids	2–4	
1903–04	Welsh Amateur Cup	Round 2	Hope Village		
1903–04	Denbighshire and Flintshire Charity Cup	Semi Final	Druids	0–5	
1904–05	Welsh Cup	Round 3	Druids	0–4	
1904–05	Welsh Amateur Cup	Round 3	Brymbo Victoria		
1905–06	Welsh Cup	Round 3	Bangor	w/o	
1905–06	Welsh Cup	Quarter Final	Wrexham	1–3	
1906-07	Welsh Amateur Cup	Round 2	Esclusham White Stars		

== Honours ==
=== League ===
- Welsh Senior League

Winners (2): 1901, 1902

- The Combination

Third (1): 1905

=== Cups ===
- Denbighshire and Flintshire Charity Cup

Finalists (2): 1901, 1902 (outcome unknown)
Winners (1): 1901
