= Wrexham Albion F.C. =

Former association football club in Wales

Wrexham Albion
- Full name: Wrexham Albion Cricket and Football Club
- Founded: c. 1867
- Dissolved: 23 August 1880 (merged into Wrexham Football Club)
- Ground: Chester Road
Home colours

Wrexham Albion were a Welsh football and cricket club from Wrexham.

== History ==
The name Wrexham Albion first appears in the cricket fixtures in August 1867.

The first mention of the team as a football club appeared in November 1877. The football club played its home games at Chester Road, Wrexham.

The club are recorded as playing in White shirts and short, with Red and Black hooped socks.

The team entered the Welsh Cup in 1879-80.

In the close season of 1880, the players of Albion (Wrexham) Football Club were amalgamated into Wrexham Football Club to provide additional depth and strength to the first and second teams.

The Wrexham Albion name briefly made a come back in 1887-88 and again in 1890–91.

== Cup history ==
Season	Competition	Round	Opposition	Score
1879-80	Welsh Cup	First Round	Wrexham Grosvenor	2-1
1879-80	Welsh Cup	Second Round	Newtown Excelsior	0-1
