= Thomas Boden =

Welsh footballer

Personal information
- Full name: Thomas Henry Boden
- Date of birth: July 7th 1860
- Place of birth: Wrexham, Wales
- Place of death: Shropshire, England
- Position: Right winger

Senior career*
Years	Team	Apps	(Gls)
1877–1881	Wrexham	8	(1)
Total		8	(1)

International career
1880	Wales	1	(0)
- * Club domestic league appearances and goals

Thomas Boden (born June 1860) was a Welsh footballer. He was part of the Wales national football team, playing 1 match on 15 March 1880 against England.

At club level, he played for Wrexham from 1879 to 1880. He played as a right wing in the 1879 Welsh Cup Final, where his team lost against Newtown White Star with 1–0.

== Honours ==
=== Wrexham ===
- Welsh Cup
  - Runners-up:1878-79

== See also ==
- List of Wales international footballers (alphabetical)
