= Rhosllanerchrugog F.C. =

Rhosllanerchrugog Football Club may refer to:

- Llanerchrugog F.C., an association football club which existed from 1876 to 1879
- Rhosllanerchrugog F.C. (1889), an association football club which existed from 1889 to 1896
- Rhosllanerchrugog F.C. (2017), an association football club which existed from 2017 to 2019
