= Woosnam =

Woosnam is a surname. Notable people with the surname include:

- George Woosnam (1860–1935), Welsh footballer
- Ian Woosnam (born 1958), Welsh golfer
- Martin Woosnam (1903–1962), English footballer
- Max Woosnam (1892–1965), English sportsman
- Maxwell Woosnam (priest) (1856–1930), British Anglican archdeacon
- Phil Woosnam (1932–2013), Welsh footballer and manager
