= 1883–84 Welsh Cup =

1883–84 Football Association of Wales Challenge Cup
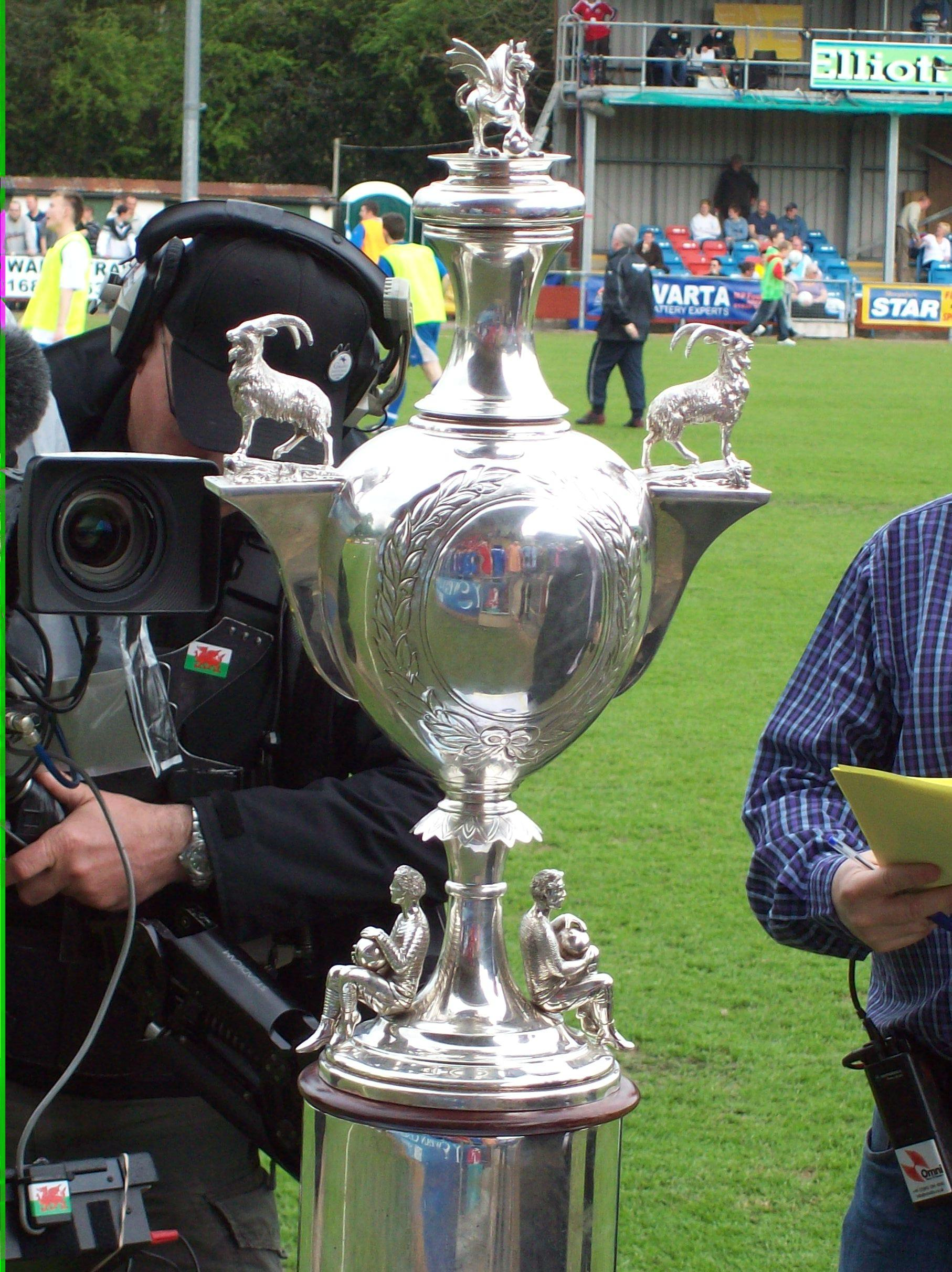
- The Welsh Cup

Tournament details
- Country: Wales

Final positions
- Champions: Oswestry
- Runners-up: Druids

The 1883–84 FAW Welsh Cup was the seventh edition of the annual knockout tournament for competitive football teams in Wales.

== First round ==
27 October 1883	Oswestry	2 – 2	White Stars Chirk	Oswestry

Trefonen	5 – 2	Black Park

Corwen	0 – 6	Wrexham

27 October 1883	Coedpoeth	0 – 9	Druids	Coedpoeth

Gwersyllt Foresters	6 – 5	Hare & Hounds (Wrexham)

27 October 1883	Rhostyllen Victoria	1 – 1	Crown F.C. (Wrexham)	Rhostyllen
15:00	G. Phoenix		C. Ellis

Northwich Victoria	walkover	Rhyl

- Northwich Victoria withdrew because of the distance.

Davenham	16 – 0	Holywell Rovers

Hartford St John's	bye

Berwyn Rangers	3 – 1	Ruthin Town

Denbigh Town	5 – 2	Ellesmere

Hope Wanderers	bye

=== Replays ===
Oswestry	4 – 1	White Stars Chirk

3 November 1883	Rhostyllen Victoria	1 – 1	Crown F.C. (Wrexham)	Rhosddu Recreation Ground, Wrexham

- Both clubs go through.

== Second round ==
Trefonen	0 – 4	Oswestry	Woodhill Oswestry

Wrexham	2 – 0	Rhostyllen Victoria

Druids	7 – 1	Gwersyllt Foresters

Crown F.C.	bye

Hartford St John's	2 – 3	Rhyl

Davenham	bye

Denbigh Town	5 – 2	Hope Wanderers

== Third round ==
Oswestry	bye

Berwyn Rangers	5 – 1	Denbigh Town

Wrexham	5 – 1	Crown F.C.

Rhyl	3 – 1	Davenham

Denbigh Town	1 – 5	Berwyn Rangers	Llangollen

== Fourth round ==
Druids	3 – 1	Wrexham

Oswestry	bye

Berwyn Rangers	bye

== Semifinals ==
Oswestry	2 – 1	Berwyn Rangers

Druids	4 – 1	Rhyl

== Final ==
5 April 1884	Druids	0 – 0	Oswestry	Racecourse Ground
				Attendance: 2,000; Referee: T Sloan (Liverpool)

=== Replay ===
14 April 1884	Druids	0 – 1	Oswestry	Racecourse Ground
			J Evans'	Attendance: 3,000; Referee: G Tagg (Wrexham)
