= 1900–01 Welsh Amateur Cup =

1900-01 Welsh Amateur Cup
Tournament details
- Country: Wales

Final positions
- Champions: Wrexham Victoria
- Runners-up: (England) Singleton & Coles

The 1900–01 Welsh Amateur Cup was the eleventh season of the Welsh Amateur Cup. The cup was won by Wrexham Victoria who defeated Singleton & Coles 1–0 in the final, at The Racecourse, Wrexham.

== First round ==
Home team	Result	Away team
Flint Red Stars		Rhyl Reserves
Druids Reserves		Ruabon Albion
Everyone else received a Bye.

== Second round ==
Home team	Result	Away team	Remarks
Shotton Rangers	5-0	Flint Red Stars	
St. Asaph Town	0-3	Rhyl Church Guild	
Llanrwst Town	1-1	Flint Reserves	Llanrwst scratched
Holyhead Swifts	1-0	Bangor Reserves	
Summerhill Albion		Dolgellau	
Wrexham Victoria	4-1	Broughton United Reserves	
Llangollen United	4-3	Wrexham Reserves	
Adwy Victoria United	Bye		
(England) Oswestry United Reserve	2-0	Whittington	
Chirk Reserves	1-2	St. Martins	
Ruabon Albion	4-0	Whitchurch Alexandra	
(England) Ellesmere Town	8-0	Llanfyllin	
(England) Singleton and Coles	6-0	Llandinam	
Machynlleth	3-1	(England) Shrewsbury Railway Officials	
(England) Shrewsbury Barracks Rovers	Bye		
Welshpool Reserves	Bye		

== Third round ==
Home team	Result	Away team	Remarks
Shotton Rangers	2-0	Rhyl Church Guild	
Holyhead Swifts		Flint Reserves	Flint scratched
Summerhill Albion	2-1	Llangollen United	
Wrexham Victoria	4-1	Adwy Victoria	
St Martins	1-4	Ruabon Albion	
(England) Ellesmere Town	1-4	(England) Oswestry United Reserve	Wharf Meadow, Ellesmere
Singleton & Coles		Welshpool Reserves	Welshpool scrached
Machynlleth		(England) Shrewsbury Barracks Rovers	Barrack Rovers scratched

== Fourth round ==
Home team	Result	Away team	Remarks
Holyhead Swifts	5-1	Shotton Rangers	Oval, Holyhead
Summerhill Albion	1-3	Wrexham Victoria	
(England) Oswestry United Reserve	6-1	Ruabon Albion	
(England) Singleton and Coles	1-0	Machynlleth	

== Semi-final ==
	Result		Venue
(England) Singleton and Coles	2-0	Holyhead Swifts	Rhyl
Wrexham Victoria	4-2	(England) Oswestry United Reserve	Wynnstay Park, Ruabon

== Final ==
Winner	Result	Runner-up	Venue
Wrexham Victoria	1-0	(England) Singleton & Coles	The Racecourse, Wrexham

8 April 1901

Wrexham Victoria	1-0	Singleton & Coles
Smith

The Racecourse Ground, Wrexham

Wrexham Victoria	Singleton & Coles
