= Llewelyn Davies (footballer) =

Welsh footballer

Llewelyn C. Davies
Personal information
- Date of birth: 1881
- Place of birth: Wrexham, Wales
- Date of death: 1961 (aged 79–80)
- Position: Full back

Senior career*
Years	Team	Apps	(Gls)
1904–1905	West Bromwich Albion	3	(0)
-1910	Wrexham		
1910-1911	Everton		
1911-1915	Wrexham		

International career
1907–1914	Wales	23	(0)
- * Club domestic league appearances and goals

Llewelyn C. Davies (1881-1961) was a Welsh international footballer. He played club football for Wrexham, Everton and West Bromwich Albion, playing on two occasions alongside his younger brother Arthur.

Davies was capped 23 times for Wales, and captained them against Ireland. His association with Wrexham was long-lasting – he played as an amateur and a professional before and after the First World War.

During the First World War he served in Italy and France.
