= Trinity (Shrewsbury) F.C. =

Defunct football club from Shrewsbury, England

Trinity (Shrewsbury)
- Full name: Trinity (Shrewsbury) Football Club
- Founded: 1877
- Dissolved: 1885
- Ground: Sutton Lane
- Secretary: C. R. Mallett
Home colours

Trinity (Shrewsbury) F.C. was an association football club based in Shrewsbury, England. The club's name was often reported simply as Trinity.

== History ==
The club was founded in 1877 and was linked to the Holy Trinity Church in the town, the church's curate William Fletcher playing in the club's first recorded match (a 1–0 win at Pontesbury).

Trinity entered the first Shropshire Senior Cup during its first season, beating Bishop's Castle 2–0 in the first round. It lost in a second round replay to Wellington Town, the eventual runner-up, being unlucky in the first match when Wallett had an open goal at his mercy right at the end of the game, but was fouled; however the Rev. Fletcher, as captain, did not claim a foul, as the umpires were too far away to adjudicate.

The club entered the 1878–79 Welsh Cup and walked over in the first round, after its scheduled opponents from the 23rd Royal Welsh Fusiliers scratched. It lost in the second round at Chirk A.A.A., only losing to a goal on the hour despite playing the tie with 10 men. Trinity put in a protest about the refereeing, but it was dismissed on the basis that the referee's decision is final.

Although the club is recorded as playing until 1885, it did not enter any national competition again.

== Colours ==
The club's colours were red and white.

== Ground ==
The club's original ground was Sutton Lane. By March 1883 the club was playing on a field at Cemetery Road, which had been the ground of the first Shrewsbury Town club.
