= Bala F.C. =

Bala
- Full name: Bala Football Club
- Founded: 1877
- Dissolved: 1883
- Ground: unnamed

Bala F.C. was a football club based in Bala, Gwynedd, Wales.

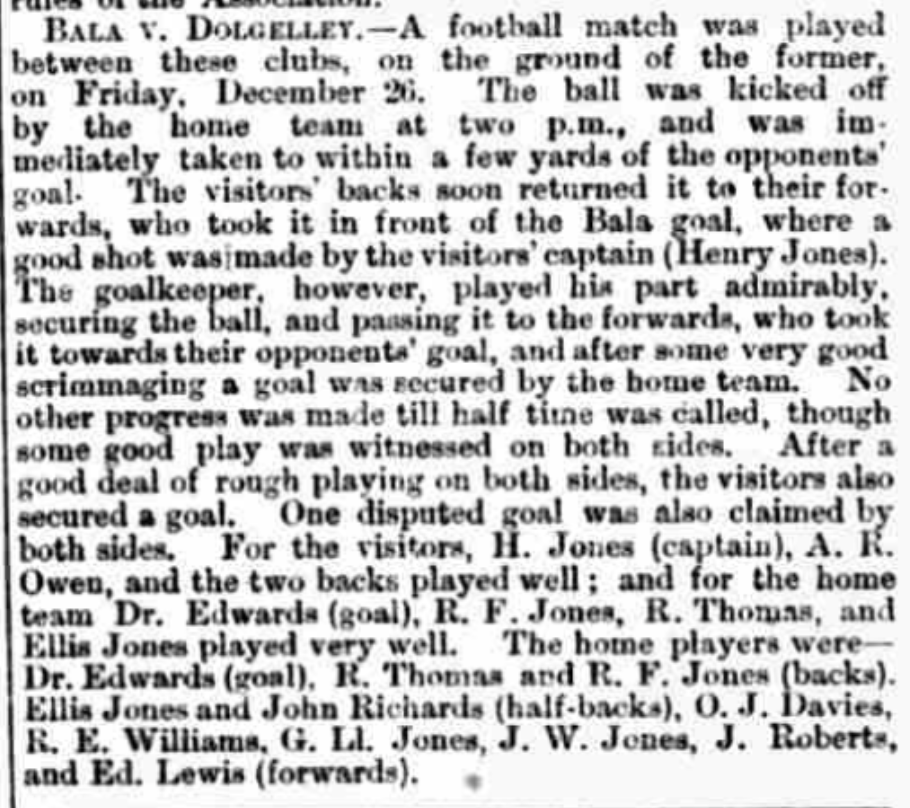
Bala 1–1 Dolgellau Idris, friendly match, Cambrian News, 2 January 1880

== History ==
Bala entered the first and third Welsh Cups, in 1877–78 and 1879–80. Both times it was drawn to play Corwen in the first round, and lost both times, albeit in the third game in 1877–78, in which Corwen scored the only goal of the tie just before half-time; there was some controversy in the first game at Corwen, as the home side did not have an umpire, and the Bala umpire in effect disallowed two claimed Corwen goals.

The club's second and last tie was more decisive, Bala going down 7–3 at home, despite the best efforts of the Roberts brothers, Edwards, and Thomas, all of whom received praise. The club continued at least into the 1883–84 season, but did not enter competitive football again.

== Ground ==
The club played on a pitch on the lake foreshore.
