= All Saints F.C. =

Defunct football club from Shrewsbury, England

All Saints
- Full name: All Saints Football Club
- Founded: 1874
- Dissolved: 1882
- Ground: Castlefields
- President: the Rev. T. M. B. Owen
Home colours

All Saints F.C. was an association football club based in Shrewsbury, England.

== History ==
Although the club claimed a foundation date of 1875, a side from "the All Saint's Club" played a match in December 1874, beating a Mr Morris' XI 4–0, thanks to goals from E. and A. Langmore, C. Holt, and E. Jones. It had strong links with All Saints' School, as it held most of its club meetings in a classroom there.

The club never entered the FA Cup, preferring to play more locally, and entered the Welsh Cup in its second and third seasons. However the club lost both of its first round ties - in 1878–79, to general surprise, against Newtown White Star, and the following season 6–0 at home to Newtown Excelsior. The latter defeat may have been due to the club fielding only one back, with W. A. Smith playing as "three-quarter back".

All Saints did not enter the competition again, and the last record of it playing is a 4–3 defeat to the Castle Blues' second XI in March 1882. A number of players, including Landucci and Cope, joined the Meole Brace club from the south-west of Shrewsbury afterwards.

== Colours ==
The club's colours were red and black hooped jerseys and stockings, with blue serge knickerbockers.

== Ground ==
The club played at Castlefields, five minutes from Shrewsbury railway station, and described as being on the River Side in 1880. The ground was owned by a Mrs Jones of Dorset Barns Estates.
