= William Fletcher (priest) =

Welsh Anglican priest

William Henry Fletcher
- Born: 1851/1852
- Died: April 2, 1926
- Occupation(s): Welsh Anglican priest, Archdeacon of Wrexham
- Years active: 1876-1926
- Notable work: Curate of Holy Trinity, Shrewsbury from 1876 to 1878; Vicar of Criftins from 1878 to 1882; Vicar of Holy Trinity, Shrewsbury from 1883 to 1888; Vicar of Oswestry from 1888 to 1891; Vicar of Wrexham from 1891 to 1907; Rural Dean of Wrexham from 1891 to 1907; Rector of Marchwiel from 1907 until his appointment as Archdeacon

William Henry Fletcher (1851/52 -2 April 1926) was a Welsh Anglican priest in the first third of the 20th century who rose to become Archdeacon of Wrexham.

Fletcher, second son of Henry Fletcher of Shrewsbury, was educated at Shrewsbury School and Christ Church, which he entered, aged 20, in 1872. He was Curate of Holy Trinity, Shrewsbury from 1876 to 1878, founding the Trinity (Shrewsbury) F.C. while there; Vicar of Criftins from 1878 to 1882; Vicar of Holy Trinity, Shrewsbury from 1883 to 1888; Vicar of Oswestry from 1888 to 1891; Vicar of Wrexham from 1891 to 1907; Rural Dean of Wrexham from 1891 to 1907; and Rector of Marchwiel from 1907 until his appointment as Archdeacon.

He died on 2 April 1926.

Church in Wales titles
Preceded by Llewelyn Wynne Jones	Archdeacon of Wrexham; 1910 – 1925	Succeeded by Lewis Pryce
