= Newtown Excelsior F.C. =

Early association football club from north Wales

Excelsior F.C. (Newtown)
- Full name: Newtown Excelsior Football Club
- Founded: 1879
- Dissolved: 1880
- Ground: Welshpool Road
- Secretary: John Pugh
Home colours

Excelsior F.C. - more generally known as Newtown Excelsior - was an association football club from Newtown, Powys, active in the 1879–80 season, and a progenitor club of the current Newtown club.

== History ==
The club was formed in September 1879, as a merger between the Newtown and White Stars clubs, and "other clubs who would join them". Edward Morgan of Newtown was chosen as captain and Edward Gittins of White Stars as "sub-captain". Its first match was a 1–0 defeat at Welshpool on 20 September.

The merger however did not work as expected. Six of the players who played in the home win over Oswestry in October were former Newtown men; only two were White Stars regulars. Although Newtown F.C. lost its identity entirely, White Stars - who were, after all, Welsh Cup holders - still existed as a separate entity, and some of its players never joined the Excelsior, while other players (including Morgan) played for both.

Excelsior entered the 1879–80 Welsh Cup, starting with a 6–0 win over All Saints of Shrewsbury, but lost to Ruthin in the third round, at the Recreation Ground in Rhosddu. Excelsior opened the scoring with the first attack, but went down 4–2 after conceding two late goals.

The week after the Cup defeat, Excelsior played White Stars, and lost by four goals, and one disputed, to nil. That seems to have been the end of the club, as at the start of the 1880–81 season, goalkeeper Hibbott, full-back D. Owen, and forwards W. Owens, Morgan, and Gittins were all playing for the White Stars. Those players, along with fellow Excelsior players J. Andrew (half-back), W. Andrew (right-wing) and George Woosnam (left-wing), were part of the White Star side which lost the 1881 Welsh Cup final.

== Colours ==
The club wore black jerseys with a cardinal hoop, white knickers, and black stockings.

== Ground ==
The club's ground was on Welshpool Road, half-a-mile from Newtown railway station, with the White Stars ground lying between the Excelsior ground and the station.

== Notable players ==
- Harry Hibbott, goalkeeper: capped twice for Wales while an Excelsior player.
