= Charles Edwards (footballer) =

Welsh footballer (1854–1943)

Personal information
- Date of birth: 1854
- Place of birth: Aberdovey, Merionethshire, Wales
- Date of death: 25 December, 1943
- Place of death: Llanymynech, Shropshire, England
- Position: Forward

Senior career*
Years	Team	Apps	(Gls)
1877-1881	Wrexham	12	(2)

International career
1878	Wales	1	(0)
- * Club domestic league appearances and goals

Charles Edwards (1854 – 1943) was a Welsh international footballer. He was part of the Wales national football team, playing 1 match on 23 March 1878 against Scotland. At club level, he played for Wrexham.

== Honours ==
=== Wrexham ===
- Welsh Cup
  - Winners: 1877–78
  - Runners-up:1878-79

== See also ==
- List of Wales international footballers (alphabetical)
