= Newtown F.C. (1875–79) =

Early association football club from north Wales

- Full name: Newtown Football Club
- Nickname: the Town Club
- Founded: 1875
- Dissolved: 1879
- Ground: Racecourse Ground
- Capacity: 2,000
- President: Cornelius Morgan
- Secretary: Ben Weall
Home colours

Newtown F.C. was an association football club from Newtown, Powys, active in the 1870s, and (indirectly) a progenitor club of the current Newtown club.

== History ==
The earliest reference to the club is of its members playing a match between themselves - divided into "Reds" and "Blues" - on the Cunnings in Newtown on 5 February 1875, with a few spectators enjoying the action. Newtown was playing other clubs by the end of the year, occasionally leading to some confusion with fellow Newtown club White Stars, although the local newspaper considered it a "most unimportant subject".

Newtown entered the first Welsh Cup in 1877–78 but lost in the first round to Druids. The club suffered a tragedy at the turn of the year, when one of its players, George Cornish, died on 19 January 1878 of an illness caught when playing for Newtown at Wrexham at the start of the year. The club broke even at the end of the season, with income of £27 1/ and expenditure of £26 8/.

The following season it reached the semi-final, where it was drawn to play the White Stars. The tie was played on neutral ground in Oswestry, and Newtown took the lead in the first half, A. Morgan heading a free-kick through his own goal; the White Stars equalized with a quarter of an hour remaining. Newtown had home advantage for the replay, but the Stars were two up inside half-an-hour; Newtown pulled one back soon after half-time after Jones dropped a Morris shot into his goal, and Morris drove a free-kick through the Stars' goal near the end, but at the time all free-kicks were indirect, so no goal was given.

The Stars went on to win the final and the two clubs met at the end of April in a hastily arrange friendly after Wrexham disappointed the town club; Newtown gained a measure of revenge with Morgan scoring the only goal of the game.

It was however the last match for the club. In August 1879, the White Stars' secretary wrote to the club with a view to fielding a combined club in the Welsh Cup. The next month, a new club - Excelsior - was duly formed, with other clubs invited to pitch in their lot. Most of the Newtown players, including captain Edward Morgan, goalkeeper Hibbott, full-back William Woosnam, half-backs Edmond Oliver and Astley, and forwards D. Williams and George Woosnam, joined the new combine, and, although White Star continued a separate existence, Newtown F.C. came to an end.

== Colours ==
The club wore amber and black.

== Ground ==
The club's practice matches were played on the Cunnings; by the time it was playing other clubs, it had gained tenure at the Newtown Racecourse Ground. The highest recorded attendance was 2,000 for the Welsh Cup semi-final replay against the White Stars.

== Notable players ==
- Harry Hibbott, goalkeeper, later capped twice for Wales while an Excelsior player.
