= Cheshire Senior Cup =

Football tournament in England

- Organiser(s): Cheshire FA
- Founded: 1879; 147 years ago
- Region: Cheshire
- Teams: 27 (2023–24)
- Current champions: Crewe Alexandra (16th title)
- Most championships: Macclesfield Town (21 titles)
- Website: Cheshire FA

The Cheshire County Football Association Challenge Cup, commonly known as the Cheshire Senior Cup, is a football knockout tournament founded in the 1879–80 season and involves teams from Cheshire, Greater Manchester and Merseyside, England. It is the County Cup competition of the Cheshire FA and currently involves teams from the Football League and non-league clubs. However, while non-league clubs often field their first team in the competition, professional clubs often field their reserve teams. The inaugural winners of the cup were Northwich Victoria in 1880 and the record winners of the trophy are Macclesfield Town.

== Inaugural season (1879–80) ==
There were just six clubs who participated in the first season of the Cheshire Senior Cup. The draw for the first round was made on 3 February 1880, with the ties played on 14 February 1880.

First round	Birkenhead	Awarded	Macclesfield
		Report

First round	Hurdsfield	1–8	Hartford St John's
		Report

First round	Northwich Victoria	3–0	Crewe Alexandra
		Report

Semi-finals	Northwich Victoria	3–1	Birkenhead
		Report

Semi-finals	Hartford St John's	Bye
		Report

Final	Hartford St John's	0–2	Northwich Victoria	Crewe
		Report		Stadium: Nantwich Road

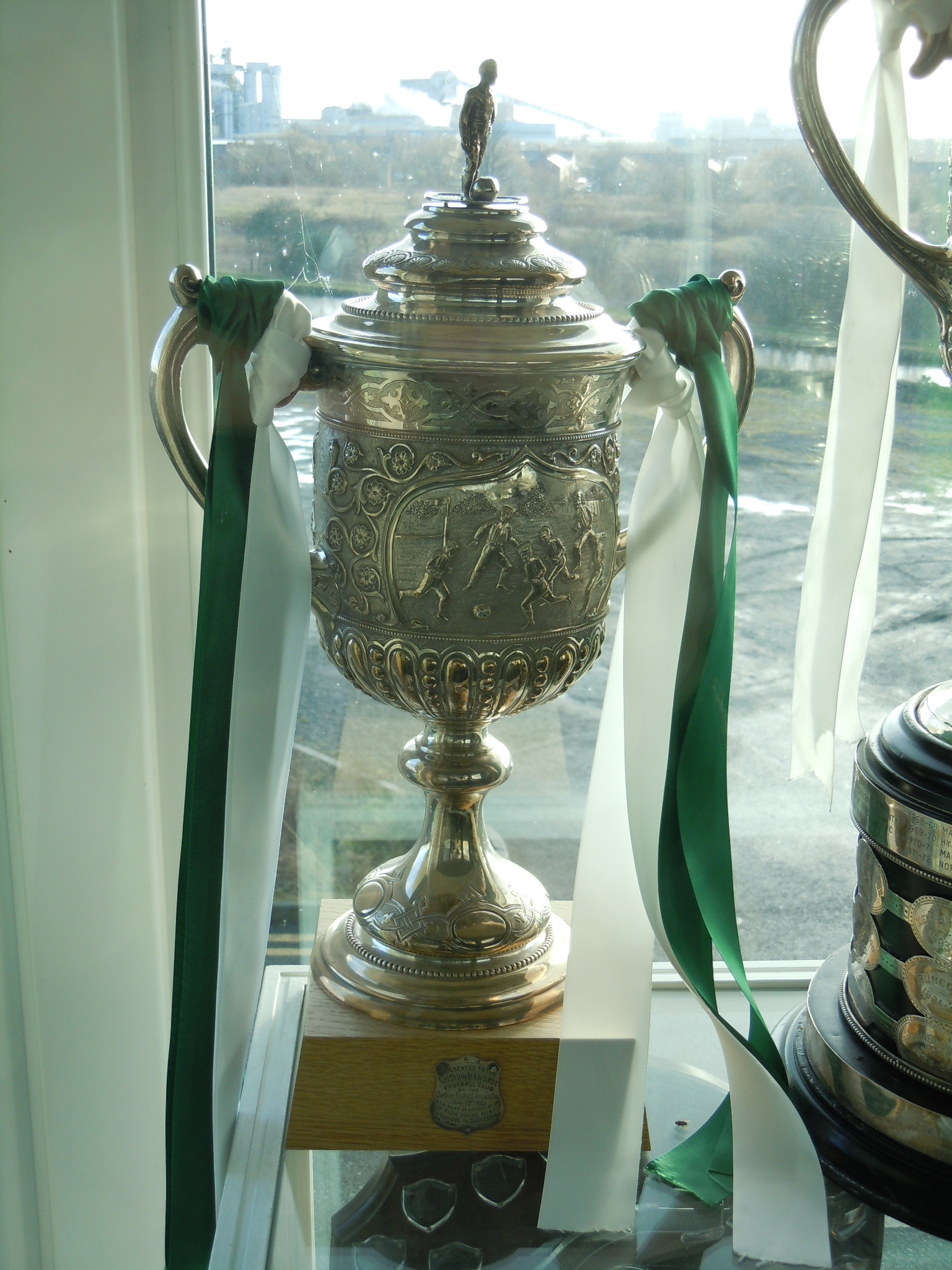
The original Cheshire Football Association Challenge Cup, which was presented to Northwich Victoria in 1885 following their success in the competition for 6 consecutive seasons. The engraving says 'Presented to Northwich Victoria Football Club by the Cheshire Football Association 23 June 1885 As a mark of appreciation for their having won it six seasons in succession'.

== Current participants (2023-24) ==
Team	Stadium	League
1874 Northwich	Townfield	NPL West
Alsager Town	Wood Park Stadium	NWCFL Division One South
Altrincham	Moss Lane	National League
Ashville	Villa Park	NWCFL Division One South
Barnton	Townfield	NWCFL Division One South
Cammell Laird 1907	Kirklands Stadium	NWCFL Division One South
Cheadle Heath Nomads	The Heath	NWCFL Division One South
Cheadle Town	Park Road	NWCFL Premier Division
Chester	Deva Stadium	National League North
Congleton Town	Cleric Stadium	MFL Premier Division
Crewe Alexandra	Alexandra Stadium	EFL League Two
Hyde United	Ewen Fields	NPL Premier Division
Macclesfield	Leasing.com Stadium	NPL Premier Division
Nantwich Town	Weaver Stadium	NPL West
Northwich Victoria	Wincham Park	MFL Premier Division
Runcorn Linnets	Millbank Linnets Stadium	NPL West
Runcorn Town	Pavilions Sports Complex	NWCFL Division One North
Sandbach United	Sandbach Football Centre	NWCFL Division One South
Stalybridge Celtic	Bower Fold	NPL West
Stockport County	Edgeley Park	EFL League Two
Stockport Georgians	Cromley Road	NWCFL Division One South
Stockport Town	Stockport Sports Village	NWCFL Division One South
Tranmere Rovers	Prenton Park	EFL League Two
Vauxhall Motors	Rivacre Park	NPL West
Warrington Town	Cantilever Park	National League North
Winsford United	Barton Stadium	NWCFL Division One South
Witton Albion	Wincham Park	NPL West

== Finals ==
A full list of finals appears on the Silkmen Archives website. Results of Finals since the 1879–80 season are:

=== Key ===
Match went to a replay
Match went to extra time
Match decided by a penalty shootout after extra time
Shared trophy

Season	Winners	Result	Runner-up	Notes
1879–80	Northwich Victoria	2–0	Hartford St John's	
1880–81	Northwich Victoria	1–1	Birkenhead	Awarded to Northwich Victoria after Birkenhead failed to appear for replay.
1881–82	Northwich Victoria	4–2	Witton Novelty	
1882–83	Northwich Victoria	1–0	Crewe Alexandra	
1883–84	Northwich Victoria	4–2	Crewe Alexandra	
1884–85	Northwich Victoria	2–1	Davenham	
1885–86	Davenham	2–1	Crewe Alexandra	
1886–87	Crewe Alexandra	1–0	Davenham	
1887–88	Crewe Alexandra	9–0	Chester	
1888–89	Northwich Victoria	3–1	Crewe Alexandra	
1889–90	Macclesfield	4–1	Nantwich	
1890–91	Macclesfield	1–0	Crewe Hornets	
1891–92	Crewe Alexandra	3–1	Northwich Victoria	
1892–93	Crewe Alexandra	3–1	Chester	Replay. First match ended 0–0.
1893–94	Macclesfield	2–1	Chester	Replay. First match ended 1–1.
1894–95	Chester	2–1	Macclesfield	
1895–96	Macclesfield	2–0	Crewe Alexandra	
1896–97	Chester	2–1	Northwich Victoria	Replay. First match ended 1–1.
1897–98	New Brighton Tower	1–0	Nantwich	
1898–99	Crewe Alexandra		New Brighton Tower	Awarded to Crewe Alexandra after New Brighton Tower failed to appear.
1899–00	Crewe Alexandra	1–0	New Brighton Tower	Replay. First match ended 1–1.
1900–01	Crewe Alexandra	4–1	Witton Albion	
1901–02	Witton Albion	2–1	Sale Homfield	
1902–03	Sale Homfield	2–1	Winsford United	
1903–04	Chester	2–1	Nantwich	Replay. First ended 1–1.
1904–05	Altrincham	2–1	Chester	
1905–06	Stockport County	2–1	Northwich Victoria	
1906–07	Crewe Alexandra	2–0	Macclesfield Town	
1907–08	Chester	4–2	Altrincham	
1908–09	Chester	3–0	Northwich Victoria	Replay. First match ended 1–1.
1909–10	Crewe Alexandra	1–0	Macclesfield Town	Replay. First match ended 1–1.
1910–11	Macclesfield	1–0	Chester City	
1911–12	Crewe Alexandra	4–2	Stalybridge Celtic	Replay. First match ended 1–1.
1912–13	Crewe Alexandra	3–1	Lostock Gralam	
1913–14	Sandbach Ramblers	3–1	Nantwich Town	
1914–15	Stockport County	1–0	Tranmere Rovers	
1915–18	No competition due to World War I.			
1918–19	Tranmere Rovers	5–1	Altrincham	
1919–20	Critchtons Athletic	1–0	Crewe Alexandra	
1920–21	Congleton Town	1–0	Winsford United	
1921–22	Witton Albion	3–0	Barnton Victoria	
1922–23	Crewe Alexandra	4–1	Altrincham	
1923–24	New Brighton	1–0	Tranmere Rovers	
1924–25	Runcorn	1–0	Crewe Alexandra	
1925–26	Tranmere Rovers	3–1	Winsford United	
1926–27	Tranmere Rovers	4–1	Winsford United	
1927–28	Witton Albion	2–1	Congleton Town	
1928–29	Northwich Victoria	2–0	Chester	
1929–30	Macclesfield	5–4	Nantwich	
1930–31	Chester	6–1	Crewe Alexandra	
1931–32	Chester	1–0	Crewe Alexandra	
1932–33	Nantwich	1–0	ICI Akali	
1933–34	Altrincham	1–0	Congleton Town	
1934–35	Macclesfield	5–2	Crewe Alexandra	
1935–36	Runcorn	2–1	Macclesfield	
1936–37	Northwich Victoria	2–0	Witton Albion	
1937–38	Congleton Town	2–1	Crewe Alexandra	
1938–39	Witton Albion	3–0	Stockport County	
1939–45	No competition due to World War II.			
1945–46	Hyde United	1–0	Witton Albion	
1946–47	Stockport County	1–0	Hyde United	
1947–48	Witton Albion	4–1	Northwich Victoria	
1948–49	Stockport County	2–0	Winsford United	
1949–50	Northwich Victoria	1–0	Macclesfield	
1950–51	Macclesfield Town	3–2	Northwich Victoria	
1951–52	Macclesfield Town	2–0	Witton Albion	
1952–53	Stalybridge Celtic	2–1	Altrincham	
1953–54	Macclesfield Town	1–0	Winsford United	
1954–55	Northwich Victoria	3–0	Stalybridge Celtic	
1955–56	Witton Albion	1–0	Altrincham	
1956–57	Ellesmere Port Town	3–2	Hyde United	
1957–58	Tranmere Rovers	6–2	Stockport County	On aggregate.
1958–59	Winsford United	1–0	Ellesmere Port Town	
1959–60	Macclesfield Town	2–1	Hyde United	
1960–61	Witton Albion	2–1	Hyde United	
1961–62	Runcorn	2–1	Hyde United	
1962–63	Hyde United	3–1	Runcorn	
1963–64	Macclesfield Town	1–0	Northwich Victoria	
1964–65	Runcorn	3–2	Tranmere Rovers	
1965–66	Stockport County	2–0	Northwich Victoria	
1966–67	Altrincham	3–2	Witton Albion	On aggregate.
1967–68	Runcorn	1–0	Crewe Alexandra	On aggregate.
1968–69	Macclesfield Town	3–1	Northwich Victoria	On aggregate.
1969–70	Hyde United	3–2	Altrincham	
1970–71	Macclesfield Town	2–1	Northwich Victoria	
1971–72	Northwich Victoria	3–1	Ellesmere Port Town	
1972–73	Macclesfield Town	2–1	Winsford United	
1973–74	Runcorn	1–0	Macclesfield Town	
1974–75	Runcorn	3–2	Altrincham	
1975–76	Nantwich Town	4–3	Runcorn	
1976–77	Northwich Victoria	4–1	Macclesfield Town	
1977–78	Witton Albion	1–0	Northwich Victoria	
1978–79	Northwich Victoria	3–1	Runcorn	
1979–80	Winsford United	4–1	Witton Albion	
1980–81	Hyde United	4–3	Stalybridge Celtic	
1981–82	Altrincham	1–0	Runcorn	
1982–83	Macclesfield Town	2–1	Congleton Town	
1983–84	Northwich Victoria	3–0	Runcorn	
1984–85	Runcorn	2–0	Altrincham	
1985–86	Runcorn	3–1	Northwich Victoria	
1986–87	Runcorn	3–1	Altrincham	
1987–88	Runcorn	2–1	Macclesfield Town	
1988–89	Runcorn	3–1	Macclesfield Town	
1989–90	Hyde United	1–0	Macclesfield Town	
1990–91	Macclesfield Town	2–0	Witton Albion	
1991–92	Macclesfield Town	2–0	Witton Albion	
1992–93	Winsford United	3–0	Witton Albion	
1993–94	Northwich Victoria	1–0	Runcorn	
1994–95	Witton Albion	2–1	Altrincham	
1995–96	Witton Albion	3–1	Hyde United	
1996–97	Hyde United	3–0	Macclesfield Town	
1997–98	Macclesfield Town	1–0	Runcorn	
1998–99	Altrincham	1–0	Northwich Victoria	
1999–00	Macclesfield Town	2–1	Altrincham	
2000–01	Stalybridge Celtic	5–1	Stockport County	
2001–02	Crewe Alexandra	4–1	Altrincham	After extra-time.
2002–03	Crewe Alexandra	2–1	Northwich Victoria	
2003–04	Woodley Sports	2–1	Witton Albion	After extra-time.
2004–05	Altrincham	2–0	Crewe Alexandra	
2005–06	Witton Albion	2–0	Stalybridge Celtic	
2006–07	Cammell Laird	3–0	Northwich Victoria	
2007–08	Nantwich Town	3–3	Altrincham	Nantwich Town won 5–3 on penalties.
2008–09	Altrincham	3–0	Nantwich Town	
2009–10	Northwich Victoria	1–1	Woodley Sports	Northwich Victoria won 5–4 on penalties.
2010–11	Northwich Victoria	2–0	Altrincham	
2011–12	Nantwich Town	1–0	Stalybridge Celtic	
2012–13	Chester	2–1	Stalybridge Celtic	
2013–14	Northwich Victoria	2–1	Tranmere Rovers reserves	
2014–15	Macclesfield Town reserves	3–2	Northwich Victoria	
2015–16	Stockport County	2–1	Tranmere Rovers reserves	After extra-time.
2016–17	Crewe Alexandra reserves	3–2	Nantwich Town	
2017–18	Nantwich Town	3–0	Stockport Town	
2018–19	Nantwich Town	5–2	Cammell Laird 1907	
2019–20	Competition abandoned due to COVID-19 pandemic. Chester, Hyde United, Nantwich Town & Warrington Town in the semi-finals.			
2020–21	Competition abandoned due to COVID-19 pandemic.			
2021–22	Stockport County reserves	5–0	Vauxhall Motors	
2022–23	Congleton Town	2–2	Altrincham	Congleton Town won 4–2 on penalties.
2023–24	Hyde United	2–2	Crewe Alexandra reserves	Hyde United won 5–2 on penalties.
2024-25	Runcorn Linnets	3-0	Stalybridge Celtic	
2025-26	Crewe Alexandra	5-2	Runcorn Town	

=== Wins by teams ===
Teams shown in italics † are no longer in existence.

Club	Wins	First final won	Last final won	Runner-up	Last final lost	Total final apps.	Notes
Macclesfield Town †	21	1889–90	2014–15	11	1996–97	32	(Note: Dissolved in 2020. Won 7 titles as Macclesfield and 1 as reserves.)
Northwich Victoria	19	1879–80	2013–14	16	2014–15	35	
Crewe Alexandra	16	1886–87	2025-26	14	2023–24	29	(Note: Won 1 title as reserves.)
Runcorn †	12	1924–25	1988–89	7	1997–98	19	
Witton Albion	11	1901–02	2005–06	10	2003–04	21	
Altrincham	7	1904–05	2008–09	15	2022–23	22	
Chester City †	7	1894–95	1931–32	6	1928–29	13	(Note: Dissolved in 2010. Won 7 titles as Chester.)
Hyde United	7	1945–46	2023–24	6	1995–96	13	
Stockport County	7	1905–06	2021–22	3	2000–01	10	(Note: Won 1 title as reserves.)
Nantwich Town	6	1932–33	2018–19	7	2016–17	13	(Note: Won 1 title as Nantwich.)
Tranmere Rovers	4	1918–19	1957–58	5	2015–16	9	
Winsford United	3	1958–59	1992–93	7	1972–73	10	
Congleton Town	3	1920–21	2022–23	3	1982–83	6	
Stalybridge Celtic	2	1952–53	2000–01	6	2012–13	8	
Davenham †	1	1885–86	1885–86	2	1886–87	3	(Note: Dissolved in 1890.)
Ellesmere Port Town	1	1956–57	1956–57	2	1971–72	3	
New Brighton Tower †	1	1897–98	1897–98	2	1899–00	3	(Note: Dissolved in 1901.)
Sale Homfield †	1	1902–03	1902–03	1	1901–02	2	(Note: Dissolved.)
Woodley Sports †	1	2003–04	2003–04	1	2009–10	2	(Note: Dissolved in 2015.)
Cammell Laird 1907	1	2006–07	2006–07	0	–	1	(Note: Won as Cammell Laird.)
Chester	1	2012–13	2012–13	0	–	1	
Critchtons Athletic †	1	1919–20	1919–20	0	–	1	(Note: Dissolved in 1958.)
Sandbach Ramblers †	1	1913–14	1913–14	0	–	1	(Note: Dissolved.)

=== Win by cities or towns ===
City	County	Titles	Teams
Northwich	Cheshire	30	Northwich Victoria (19), Witton Albion (11)
Macclesfield	Cheshire	21	Macclesfield Town (21)
Crewe	Cheshire	16	Crewe Alexandra (16)
Runcorn	Cheshire	13	Runcorn (12), Runcorn Linnets (1)
Chester	Cheshire	8	Chester City (7), Chester (1)
Stockport	Greater Manchester	8	Stockport County (7), Woodley Sports (1)
Altrincham	Greater Manchester	7	Altrincham (7)
Hyde	Greater Manchester	7	Hyde United (7)
Nantwich	Cheshire	6	Nantwich Town (6)
Birkenhead	Merseyside	5	Tranmere Rovers (4), Cammell Laird 1907 (1)
Winsford	Cheshire	3	Winsford United (3)
Congleton	Cheshire	3	Congleton Town (3)
Stalybridge	Greater Manchester	2	Stalybridge Celtic (2)
New Brighton	Merseyside	2	New Brighton (1), New Brighton Tower (1)
Davenham	Cheshire	1	Davenham (1)
Ellesmere Port	Cheshire	1	Ellesmere Port Town (1)
Sale	Greater Manchester	1	Sale Homfield (1)
Liverpool	Merseyside	1	Critchtons Athletic (1)
Sandbach	Cheshire	1	Sandbach Ramblers (1)
