= Henry Edwards (footballer) =

Welsh footballer

Personal information
- Full name: Henry Valentine Edwards
- Date of birth: 1856
- Place of birth: Wales
- Date of death: 1913 (aged 56–57)
- Position: Defender

Senior career*
| Years | Team | Apps | (Gls) |
- Wrexham
| 1882 | Wrexham Civil Service | | |

International career
| 1878–1887 | Wales | 8 | (0) |
- * Club domestic league appearances and goals

Henry Edwards (1856 – 1913) was a Welsh international footballer. He was part of the Wales national football team, playing 8 matches. He played his first match on 23 March 1878 against Scotland and his last match on 12 March 1887 against Ireland. At club level, he played for Wrexham and Wrexham Civil Service.

== See also ==
- List of Wales international footballers (alphabetical)
