= Leonora Lea =

Leonora Edith Lea
- Born: 30 March 1896; New Glasgow, Nova Scotia, Canada
- Died: 28 October 1971 (aged 75); Sydenham, England
- Education: Cheltenham Ladies' College, University of London (BA, external student)
- Occupations: Missionary, educator, writer
- Notable work: Window on Japan (1956)
- Parent(s): Reverend Arthur Lea and Mary Lea
- Awards: Order of the Sacred Treasure (4th Class)

Leonora Edith Lea (30 March 1896 – 28 October 1971) was a Canadian Anglican missionary who lived and worked in Japan as a school teacher, writer, and senior administrator of the Anglican Church in Japan.

Lea was one of the few church missionary workers to live in Japan throughout the Pacific War. Her collected writings and recollections of that period offer a rare first-hand English-language account of life in wartime Japan.

With Bishop Michael Hinsuke Yashiro, Lea is credited as the founder of St. Michael's International School, Kobe.

== Early life and career ==
Born 30 March 1896 in New Glasgow, Nova Scotia, Canada, the eldest of seven children born to Reverend Arthur and Mary Lea. In 1897, her father volunteered to serve in Toyohashi, Gifu Prefecture, Japan, as a missionary for the Nippon Sei Ko Kai. Arthur Lea was subsequently consecrated as Bishop of Kyushu in 1908.

Lea attended Cheltenham Ladies' College and studied for a BA degree as an external student of the University of London. Returning to Japan in 1927 she worked as SPG sponsored educational missionary in Kobe assigned to the Shoin Girls School.

During the war period, Lea elected to remain in Japan and coordinated emergency relief and food distribution efforts for the foreign community in Kobe. Lea subsequently served as an executive assistant to the Presiding Bishop of the Anglican Church in Japan, Bishop Michael Hinsuke Yashiro.

In 1969 she was honoured by the Japanese Government and awarded the 4th class Order of the Sacred Treasure.

Lea died on 28 October 1971 in Sydenham, England.

== Published work ==
- Window on Japan, Seabury Press (1956)
