= 1901–02 Welsh Amateur Cup =

1901-02 Welsh Amateur Cup
Tournament details
- Country: Wales

Final positions
- Champions: Wrexham Victoria
- Runners-up: Machynlleth Town

The 1901–02 Welsh Amateur Cup was the twelfth season of the Welsh Amateur Cup. Wrexham Victoria defeated Machynlleth Town 1–0 in the final, at Oswestry.

Wrexham Victoria were awarded the cup, which Machynlleth protested, saying that Wrexham Victoria had used five players who were ineligible due to having played in the Chester & District League. Their protest was successful and Wrexham Victoria were ordered to return the cup to the Football Association of Wales. It is unclear if the cup was ever awarded to Machynlleth. Wrexham Victoria are recorded as the cup winners by recent sources such as the RSSSF.

== First round ==
Home team	Result	Away team	Remarks
Bangor Reserves		Holyhead Swifts	
Llanrwst	Bye		
Flint	4-0	Rhyl Church Guild	
Holywell	3-4	Rhyl Reserves	
Ruabon Albion	0-1	Wrexham Victoria	
Adwy Victoria	3-1	Shotton Rangers	Shotton progressed after protest.
Broughton United	4-1	Mynydd Isa	
Druids Reserves		Wrexham St Giles	St Giles scratched
Rhosrobin	4-3	Royal Welsh Depot	
(England) St. Martins	1-1	Chirk Reserve	
Pentre Athletic (Newbridge)	0-2	(England) Oswestry Reserve	
(England) Ellesmere Town	3-2	Llanfyllin	
(England) Whittington	Bye		
Dolgelley	5-3	Corwen	Dolgelley disqualified from first match, Corwen won replay 2–1.
Bala Press	Bye		
(England) Broseley Albion	7-2	(England) Shrewsbury Railway Officials	
Machynlleth	3-1	Newtown Excelsior	
(England) Singleton & Cole's	1-0	Llandinam	
Newtown United	4-2	(England) Shrewsbury Barrack Rovers	

== Second round ==
Home team	Result	Away team	Remarks
Holyhead Swifts	2-1	Llanrwst	
Flint		Rhyl Reserves	
Rhosrobin	0-1	Druids Reserves	
Shotton Rangers		Broughton United	Shotton scratched
Wrexham Victoria	Bye		
(England) Ellesmere Town	2-3	Chirk Reserve	
(England) Oswestry Reserve	1-1	(England) Whittington	Oswestry won replay 3–1.
Corwen	0-6	Bala Press	
(England) Singleton & Cole's	2-0	(England) Broseley Albion	
Newtown United	2-3	Machynlleth	

== Third round ==
Home team	Result	Away team	Remarks
Flint		Wrexham Victoria	
Druids Reserve	3-2	(England) Oswestry Reserve	
Everyone else received a Bye			

== Fourth round ==
Home team	Result	Away team	Remarks
Chirk Reserve	1-7	Wrexham Victoria	
Holyhead Swifts	1-2	(England) Singleton & Cole's	
Bala Press	1-2	Machynlleth	
Broughton United Reserve		Druids Reserve	

== Semi-final ==
	Result		Venue
Machynlleth	3-2	(England) Singleton & Cole's	R.W.W. Recreation Ground, Newtown
Wrexham Victoria	1-0	Broughton United Reserve	Ruabon

== Final ==
Winner	Result	Runner-up	Venue
Wrexham Victoria	1-0	Machynlleth Town	(England) Cricket Field, Oswestry

5 April 1902

Wrexham Victoria	1-0	Machynlleth Town
H Edwards

Cricket Field, Oswestry
Referee: R T Gough, Oswestry

Wrexham Victoria	Machynlleth Town
