= Harry Trainer =

Welsh footballer (1872–1924)

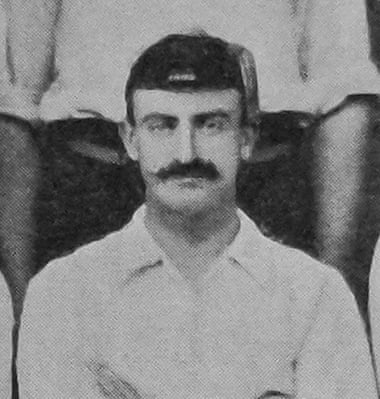

Personal information
- Full name: Henry Trainer
- Date of birth: 1872
- Place of birth: Wrexham, Wales
- Date of death: May 15th, 1924 (aged 51)
- Place of death: Wrexham, Wales
- Position: Centre forward

Senior career*
Years	Team	Apps	(Gls)
1890–1891	Wrexham Victoria		
1891–1893	Wrexham Grosvenor		
1893–1894	Westminster Rovers		
1894–1895	Wrexham	9	(14)
1895–1897	Leicester Fosse	31	(12)
1897–1899	Sheppey United		
1899–1900	Wrexham	1	(2)
- Poolsbrook United
- Clowne White Stars

International career
1895	Wales	3	(2)
- * Club domestic league appearances and goals

Harry Trainer (1872 – May 1924) was a Welsh international footballer. He was part of the Wales national football team, playing three matches and scoring two goals. He played his first match on 16 March 1895 against Ireland and his last match on 23 March 1895 against Scotland. At club level, he played for Leicester Fosse and was topscorer of the team of the 1895–96 season with 14 goals.

== Personal life ==
In 1894, Trainer was cautioned for assault of a pub landlord at a match celebration, the victim accepting £5 on behalf of a hospital charity in compensation. In January 1901, Trainer was sentenced to nine months imprisonment with hard labour for breaking and entering, and theft of jewellery, in Wrexham and was imprisoned in Ruthin Gaol. In 1907 he was summonsed for stealing a cockerel and three hens while living in Derbyshire.

In 1917 he married a Wrexham widow, Emily Coathupe.

== See also ==
- List of Wales international footballers (alphabetical)
