= Wrexham Hare and Hounds Club =

Former association football club in Wales

Hare & Hounds (Wrexham)
- Full name: Wrexham Hare and Hounds Club
- Nickname: Hounds
- Founded: c. 1873
- Dissolved: c. 1888
- Ground: The Racecourse Ground, Wrexham

Hare & Hounds were a Welsh football and athletics club from Wrexham.

== History ==
The club was formed around 1873, and existed during the Victorian era. Their football team played in the Welsh Cup competition during its formative years. The club was granted free use of The Racecourse Ground by Sir Watkin Williams-Wynn.

== Cup History ==
Season	Competition	Round	Opposition	Score
1881–82	Welsh Cup	Round 1	Wrexham Athletic	1–2
1882–83	Welsh Cup	Round 1	Coedpoeth	1–1
1882–83	Welsh Cup	Round 1 Replay	Coedpoeth	4–2
1882–83	Welsh Cup	Round 2	Northwich Victoria	1–5
1883–84	Welsh Cup	Round 1	Gwersyllt Foresters	5–6

== Notable players ==
- John Eyton-Jones – Wales Football International.
- (Wales) Alexander Hunter, Welsh international footballer
