= 1882–83 Welsh Cup =

1882–83 Football Association of Wales Challenge Cup
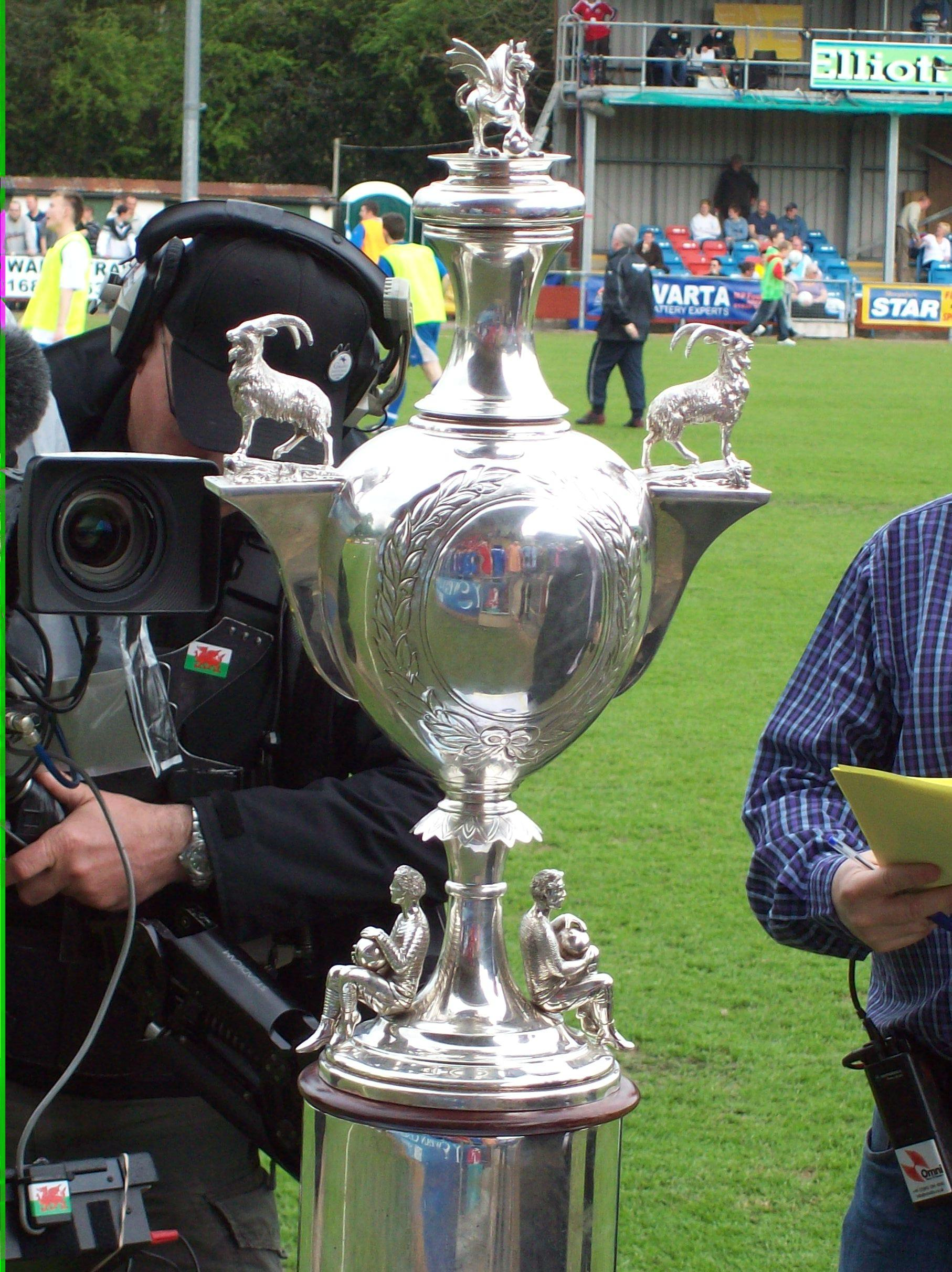
- The Welsh Cup

Tournament details
- Country: Wales
- Teams: 22

Final positions
- Champions: Wrexham
- Runners-up: Druids

The 1882–83 FAW Welsh Cup was the sixth edition of the annual knockout tournament for competitive football teams in Wales.

== First round ==
| Rhyl | walkover | Corwen |

- Corwen failed to appear for the arranged fixture.

| Dolgellau Idris | 6 – 1 | Holywell Rovers, at Corwen |

| 4 November 1882 | Denbigh Town | 3 – 3 | Ruthin Town |

| Aberystwyth | bye |

| Hartford | 9 – 0 | Crown F.C. |

| 4 November 1882 | Coedpoeth | 1 – 1 | Hare & Hounds (Wrexham) | Coedpoeth |

| 28 October 1882 | Wrexham | 4 – 1 | Davenham | Rhosddu Recreation Ground |
| | W. Roberts x1, R. Davies x1, M. Davies x1 |

| Hope District | 1 – 10 | Northwich Victoria |

| 4 November 1882 | Oswestry White Star | 1 – 0 | Trefonen | Oswestry |

| Chirk | 2 – 3 | Druids |

| 4 November 1882 | Black Park | 0 – 5 | Berwyn Rangers |
| | | | J.E Jones x3, T. Attwell x2 |

| Dolgellau Mountaineers | bye |

=== Replays ===
| Hare & Hounds (Wrexham) | 2 – 2 | Coedpoeth |

== Second round ==
| 9 December 1882 | Aberystwyth | 2 – 0 | Dolgellau Idris | Aberystwyth |

| Ruthin Town | bye |

| 16 December 1882 | Rhyl (Skull and Cross-Bones) | 3 – 2 | Hartford | Rhyl |

| 9 December 1882 | Coedpoeth | 2 – 4 | Wrexham | Coedpoeth |

| 16 December 1882 | Hare & Hounds (Wrexham) | 1 – 5 | Northwich Victoria | The Racecourse, Wrexham |
| | J. Pugh |

| Druids | 12 – 1 | Dolgellau Mountaineers |

| 16 December 1882 | Berwyn Rangers | 5 – 2 | Oswestry White Star | Llangollen |

== Third round ==
| Northwich Victoria | 1 – 1 | Berwyn Rangers |

| Wrexham | 4 – 2 | Ruthin Town | Rhosddu Recreation Ground |

| Aberystwyth | 1 – 4 | Druids |

| Rhyl | bye |

=== Replays ===
| Northwich Victoria | 1 – 1 | Berwyn Rangers |

== Fourth round ==
| Wrexham | 5 – 2 | Rhyl | Rhosddu Recreation Ground |

| Berwyn Rangers | 2 – 5 | Druids |

| Northwich Victoria | bye |

== Semifinals ==
| Druids | 3 – 0 | Northwich Victoria |

| Wrexham | bye |

== Final ==
21 April 1883
15:30

| Wrexham | 1 – 0 | Druids |
|---|---|---|
| W Roberts 75' |

Racecourse Ground, Wrexham
Attendance: 2,000
Referee: Mr WH Holt (Shrewsbury)

| Wrexham | Druids |
