= Wrexham Grosvenor F.C. =

Former association football club in Wales

Wrexham Grosvenor
- Full name: Wrexham Grosvenor Football Club
- Nickname(s): Grosvenor
- Founded: 1876
- Dissolved: 1893
- Ground: Mr Snape's Field, Chester Road
- Secretary: John Taylor
Home colours

Wrexham Grosvenor Football Club was a Welsh football club based in Wrexham, who played in the Welsh Cup in the 1879–80 and 1880–81 seasons.

== History ==
The club was founded in 1876, out of a cricket club.

In 1877 at a meeting held at The Walnut Tree, Wrexham, Mr F Jones was selected as club captain, with Mr J Grant as vice-captain. The following year Mr T Jones was captain, with Mr E Hopkins as vice-captain.

The last recorded match for the club is a 6–1 win over Rhosrobin Institute in October 1893.

== Colours ==
The club wore white jerseys, blue (serge) knickerbockers, and red stockings.

== Ground ==
The club's ground, at Mr Snape's Field, on the Chester Road, was a 10 minute walk from Wrexham railway station.

== Cup history ==
| Season | Competition | Round | Opposition | Score |
|---|---|---|---|---|
| 1879–80 | Welsh Cup | First Round | Wrexham Albion | 1–2 |
| 1880–81 | Welsh Cup | First Round | Northwich Victoria | 0–3 |

== Notable players ==
- Arthur Lea – Wales Football International.
- Harry Trainer – Wales Football International.
- James Trainer – Wales Football International.
