= Wrexham Victoria F.C. =

Former Association football club in Wales

Wrexham Victoria
- Full name: Wrexham Victoria Football Club
- Nickname: Vics
- Founded: 18 August 1899
- Dissolved: c. May 1908
- Ground: Bennion Road, Salisbury Park, Wrexham
Home colours

Wrexham Victoria F.C. were a Welsh football club based in Wrexham, Wales.

== History ==
Formed on Tuesday 18 August 1899 in the Bowling Green Pub, when Erddig Albion changed their to that of an older club with the same name. Wrexham Victoria's first game was a 5–4 defeat against Newton Rangers, on Saturday 2 September 1899, in the Chester and District League, whilst their first victory was a 3–2 win over Tarporley on 16 September 1899.

Wrexham Victoria won the Football Association of Wales Trophy four times in 1890–91, 1900–01, 1901–02 and 1903–04. They joined The Combination for the 1906–07 season, however they finished bottom of the league.

They were to be found playing in Division One of the Wrexham and District League for 1907–08.

The Wrexham Victoria name did make a return in the 1920s. They appear in the second round draw of the Welsh Amateur Cup in 1923–24 against Wrexham Civil Service. They were beaten 5–0 by Oswestry in the 1924–25 Welsh Amateur Cup.

== Colours ==
The club wore red shirts, at a time when Wrexham F.C. was wearing green.

== Seasons ==
Season	League										Cup
Season	Division	P	W	D	L	GF	GA	Pts	Pos	Teams in League	Welsh Cup	Welsh Amateur Cup	Denbighshire & Flintshire Cup	Other
1899-1900	Chester and District League	18							2	10		SF
1900–01	Chester and District League Division 1	14	9	4	1	39	24	19	2	8		W
1901–02	Chester and District League Division 1	16							1	9		W		Chester Charity Cup Winners
1902–03	Chester and District League	14	7	4	3	45	21	17	3	8		4R	RU
1903–04	West Cheshire League Division 1	20	13	3	4	56	27	29	2	11		W
1904–05	West Cheshire League Division 1	20	13	3	4	44	14	29	1	11		3R		St Martins Cup Runner Up
1905–06	West Cheshire League Division 1	22	10	2	10	45	41	22	6	12		3R	RU
1906–07	The Combination	26	8	0	18	29	44	16	14	14	3R
1907–08	Wrexham and District League Division 1	18	4	2	12	31	57	10	9	10 (+2 who withdrew)	1R	3R

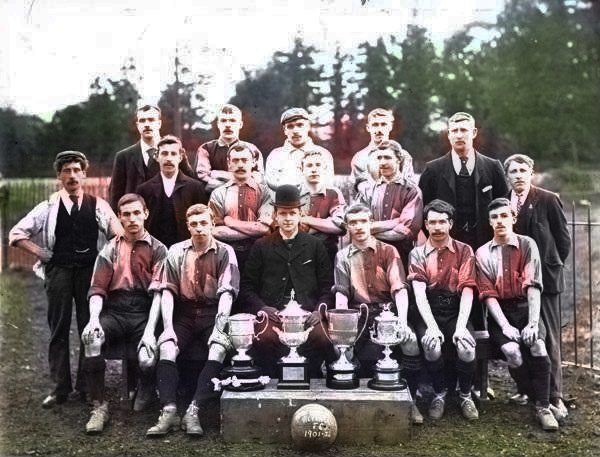
Wrexham Victoria 1901–1902

== Notable players ==
- Harry Trainer – Wales Football International.
- James Trainer – Wales Football International.
- Horace Blew – Wales Football International, Mayor of Wrexham in 1923.
- William Davies – Wales Football International. League Champion with Blackburn Rovers in 1912.
- Edwin Hughes – Wales Football International.
- Job Wilding – Wales Football International.
- Tom Burke – Wales Football International.
- Arthur Davies – Wales Football International.

== Honours ==
=== League ===
- Chester and District League
  - Winners (1): 1902
  - Runners-up (2): 1900, 1901
- West Cheshire League Division 1
  - Winners (1): 1905
  - Runners-up (1): 1904

=== Cup ===
- Welsh Amateur Cup
  - Winners (4): 1891, 1901, 1902, 1904
- Denbighshire and Flintshire Charity Cup
  - Runners-up (2): 1903, 1906
- Chester Charity Cup
  - Winners (1): 1902
- St Martins Cup
  - Runners-up (1): 1905
- Yerburgh Challenge Cup
  - Winners (1): 1902

== Other Info ==
Wrexham Victoria F.C. are not to be confused with Wrexham F.C., Wrexham Olympic F.C. or Wrexham Gymnasium F.C.
