= Edward Phennah =

English-born Welsh footballer

Personal information
- Date of birth: 1859
- Place of birth: Birkenhead, England
- Date of death: 18 May 1923 (aged 63–64)
- Place of death: Wrexham, Wales
- Position: Goalkeeper

Senior career*
Years	Team	Apps	(Gls)
1878-1883	Wrexham	4	(0)
1878–1879	Wrexham Civil Service		

International career
1878	Wales	1	(0)
- * Club domestic league appearances and goals

Edward Phennah (born 1859) was a Welsh international footballer. A goalkeeper, he represented Wales on one occasion, becoming one of the first English born players to represent the country, on 23 March 1878 during a 9–0 defeat against Scotland. Phennah played for Wrexham at club level, playing in the club's first competitive fixture in the inaugural Welsh Cup in the 1877–78 season. His three consecutive clean sheets in the tournament remains a club record for a goalkeeper playing in his first three matches, keeping his third clean sheet in a 1–0 victory over Druids in the final of the competition.

== Honours ==
=== Wrexham ===
- Welsh Cup
  - Winners: 1877–78

== See also ==
- List of Wales international footballers (alphabetical)
- List of Wales international footballers born outside Wales
