= Arthur Lea (footballer) =

Welsh footballer

Personal information
- Date of birth: 23 November 1866
- Place of birth: Wrexham, Wales
- Date of death: 23 March 1945 (aged 78)
- Place of death: Marchwiel, Wales
- Position: Inside forward

Youth career
- 1881–1883: Wrexham Grosvenor

Senior career*
Years	Team	Apps	(Gls)
1883–1895	Wrexham		

International career
1889–1893	Wales	4	(0)
- * Club domestic league appearances and goals

Arthur Lea (23 November 1866 – 23 March 1945) was a Welsh footballer who played as an inside forward for Wrexham in the 1880s and 1890s. Despite having only one arm, he also made four appearances for the Wales national side.

== Football career ==
Lea was born in Wrexham and started his football career at the age of 15 when he helped launch the Wrexham Grosvenor club. He started out playing at full-back although he could play on the left wing when required. Despite only having one arm, he possessed "a natural flair with the ball" and his "all-round skill on the field" compensated for his disability, being noted for his "tremendous and powerful kick".

By 1883, he had joined Wrexham, initially as a reserve player but was quickly promoted to the first team, signing as a professional for a weekly wage of 5 shillings, with bonuses enabling this to reach 10 shillings; this made him reputedly the highest paid player in Wales.

Lea made his international debut for Wales on 23 February 1889, when he played at inside-left in the 4–1 defeat by England.

In 1889–90, Lea was a member of the Wrexham team that reached the final of the Welsh Cup, going down 1–0 to Chirk. Later that year, Wrexham joined The Combination league. Their first game was played on 6 September 1890 against Gorton Villa, with Lea scoring Wrexham's only goal in a 5–1 defeat. Like Lea, his team-mated James Roberts also had only one arm. Although they only finished their inaugural league season in the penultimate position, Wrexham again reached the Welsh Cup Final, losing 5–2 to Shrewsbury Town.

Lea received three further international caps, at left-half against Ireland on 7 February 1891 (lost 7–2), at right-half against Scotland on 21 March 1891 (lost 4–3) and at right-half against Ireland on 8 April 1893 (lost 4–3), when he was team captain; thus, he was on the losing side in all four of his international appearances. In his FAW assessment in 1891, he was described as "a good, hard-working player – called upon at the last moment and had to play in the wrong position, appeared nervous. Played a good game against Ireland at left-half."

Shortly before his final international appearance, Lea captained Wrexham to victory in the Welsh Cup Final, defeating Chirk 2–1 on 3 April.

Later that year, Lea became seriously ill and was at one point threatened with the loss of a leg. He eventually recovered and re-commenced his playing career in 1895, helping Wrexham reach the final of the Welsh Cup when they were defeated 3–2 by Newtown.

Shortly afterwards, he was involved in an ill-tempered match against Druids in the Soames Charity Cup Final; Wrexham won the match with the only goal scored. At the end of the match, the Wrexham players were so roughly handled by some of the spectators that they had to flee from the pitch and make their way back to Wrexham as best they could. Lea later stated that "if that was what football was all about, it was the end for him". True to his word, that was his final appearance for the Wrexham first team, although he made a few appearances for the reserves.

In December 1895, he was the beneficiary of a testimonial match between a Wrexham & District XI and Liverpool, won 5–0 by the visitors.

== Career outside football ==
Lea combined his football career with working as a postman – he sometimes started work at 5.30 a.m., did an 18-mile round on foot, and then caught the 9.20 train to an away match. After the match, he would return to Chester after the last train to Wrexham had departed, so had to walk home and be back on duty next morning. By 1900, he was reckoned to have walked over 80,000 miles in the service of the Post Office.

After retiring from the Post Office, he became the landlord of the Wrest Hotel at Marchwiel, where he died on 23 March 1945, aged 78.

Lea also played for Wrexham Cricket Club, principally as a bowler, but was also a useful batsman, making several half-centuries.

== Honours ==
Wrexham

- Welsh Cup winners: 1893
- Welsh Cup finalists: 1890, 1891 and 1895.
