= James Lloyd (footballer) =

Welsh footballer (1861–?)

Personal information
- Full name: James William Lloyd
- Date of birth: 1861
- Place of birth: Wales

Senior career*
Years	Team	Apps	(Gls)
1879–1880	Wrexham		
1884–1885	Newtown		

International career
1879	Wales	1	(0)
- * Club domestic league appearances and goals

James William Lloyd (born 1861) was a Welsh footballer who played for Wrexham and Newtown. He was part of the Wales national team, playing one match on 7 April 1879 against Scotland.

== Honours ==
Wrexham

- Welsh Cup runner-up: 1878–79

== See also ==
- List of Wales international footballers (alphabetical)
