= 1903–04 Welsh Amateur Cup =

1903-04 Welsh Amateur Cup
Tournament details
- Country: Wales

Final positions
- Champions: Wrexham Victoria
- Runners-up: Druids Reserves

The 1903–04 Welsh Amateur Cup was the fourteenth season of the Welsh Amateur Cup. The cup was won by Wrexham Victoria who defeated Druids Reserves 4–2 in the final, at Oswestry.

== First round ==
| Home team | Result | Away team | Remarks |
|---|---|---|---|
| Bangor Reserves | 4-1 | Llandudno Amateurs | |
| Llanrwst | 5-4 | Rhyl Reserves | |
| Colwyn Bay | 6-1 | Rhuddlan | |
| Mynydd Isa | 1-2 | Flint Town | |
| Flint UAC | | Connahs Quay | |
| Hawarden Bridge | 2-2 | Mold Alyn Wanderers | |
| Gwersyllt | 2-0 | Wrexham St Giles | |
| Brymbo Victoria | 10-0 | Penyffordd United | |
| Bersham United | | Wrexham Victoria | |
| Wrexham Crescent | 2-2 | Gresford | |
| (England) St Martins | 0-2 | Black Park | |
| Llandinum | 2-3 | Welshpool Reserves | |
| Machynlleth | 0-11 | Newtown North End | |
| Porthmadog | All received a Bye. | | |
| Mold Amateurs | All received a Bye. | | |
| Broughton United | All received a Bye. | | |
| Hope Village | All received a Bye. | | |
| Esclusham White Stars | All received a Bye. | | |
| Wrexham Cambrian Athletic/Cambrian Leather Works | All received a Bye. | | |
| Chirk Reserves | All received a Bye. | | |
| Druids Reserves | All received a Bye. | | |
| Rhos Rangers | All received a Bye. | | |
| Ruthin | All received a Bye. | | |
| Corwen | All received a Bye. | | |
| Bala Press | All received a Bye. | | |
| (England) Whitchurch | All received a Bye. | | |
| (England) Oswestry Reserves | All received a Bye. | | |
| Llanfyllin | All received a Bye. | | |
| Llanidloes | All received a Bye. | | |
| Llanymynech | All received a Bye. | | |
| Newtown Royal Welsh Warehouse | All received a Bye. | | |

== Second round ==
| Home team | Result | Away team | Remarks |
|---|---|---|---|
| Porthmadog | 4-2 | Bangor Reserves | |
| Llanrwst | | Colwyn Bay | |
| Flint Town | 5-4 | Mold Alyn Wanderers | |
| Mold Amateurs | | Flint UAC | |
| Hope Village | | Broughton United | |
| Gwersyllt | | Brymbo Victoria | |
| Esclusham White Stars | | Cambrian Leather Works | |
| Wrexham Victoria | | Gresford | |
| Black Park | 1-1 | Rhos Rangers | Rhos won replay 4–1. |
| Chirk Reserves | | Druids Reserves | |
| Ruthin | | Corwen | |
| (England) Whitchurch | | Llanfyllin | |
| (England) Oswestry Reserves | | Llanymynech | |
| Newtown North End | | Welshpool Reserves | |
| Newtown Royal Welsh Warehouse | | Llanidloes | |
| Bala Press | Bye | | |

== Third round ==
| Home team | Result | Away team | Remarks |
|---|---|---|---|
| Porthmadog | 3-1 | Colwyn Bay | |
| Flint Town | 5-0 | Flint UAC | |
| Gwersyllt | 3-0 | Hope Village | |
| Wrexham Victoria | 4-0 | Esclusham White Star | |
| Rhos Rangers | 1-1 | Druids Reserves | Druids won replay 3-2 |
| Bala Press | 2-1 | Corwen | |
| (England) Whitchurch | | (England) Oswestry Reserves | |
| Newtown North End | 3-0 | Newtown Royal Welsh Warehouse | |

== Fourth round ==
| Home team | Result | Away team | Remarks |
|---|---|---|---|
| Porthmadog | 1-0 | Gwersyllt | |
| Druids Reserves | 3-1 | Flint Town | |
| Bala Press | | Wrexham Victoria | |
| (England) Whitchurch | 7-2 | Newtown North End | |

== Semi-final ==
| | Result | | Venue |
|---|---|---|---|
| (England) Whitchurch | 2-3 | Wrexham Victoria | (England) Oswestry |
| Porthmadog | 1-3 | Druids Reserves | Bangor |

== Final ==
| Winner | Result | Runner-up | Venue |
|---|---|---|---|
| Wrexham Victoria | 4-2 | Druids Reserves | (England) Oswestry |
