= Arthur Lea (bishop) =

The Right Reverend Arthur Lea (1868 – January 19, 1958) was a Canadian Anglican bishop who served as Bishop of Kyushu.

A graduate of Wycliffe College, Toronto, his mission work for the Nippon Sei Ko Kai started in Gifu Prefecture in 1897 where he established a pioneering school for the blind. He was consecrated Bishop of Kyushu, an Anglican diocese supported by the Church Missionary Society in 1909.

His daughter, Leonora Lea, was an SPG sponsored educational missionary in Kobe.
