= Arthur Davies (footballer) =

Welsh footballer (1886–1949)

Personal information
- Date of birth: 10 January 1886
- Place of birth: Wrexham, Wales
- Date of death: 12 November 1949 (aged 63)
- Place of death: Overton, Wrexham, Wales
- Position: Outside right

Youth career
- Wrexham St Giles

Senior career*
Years	Team	Apps	(Gls)
?–1903	Wrexham		
1903–1904	Druids		
1904–1905	West Bromwich Albion	12	(1)
1905–?	Middlesbrough		
- Wrexham Nomads

International career
1904–1905	Wales	2	(0)
- * Club domestic league appearances and goals

Arthur Davies (10 January 1886 – November 1949) was a Welsh international footballer. He was part of the Wales national football team between 1904 and 1905, playing two matches. He played his first match on 12 March 1904 and his second on 6 March 1905, both against Scotland.

== Career ==
Davies began his playing career with Wrexham St. Giles before signing as a Professional for Wrexham. Following his spell at Wrexham he moved to local rivals Druids, where he achieved one cap for Wales.

In June 1904, he joined West Bromwich Albion where he twice had the opportunity to play alongside his brother Llewellyn. In January 1905, after 12 appearances for West Bromwich Albion, Arthur was sent to Middlesbrough, where he played a few games before returning to Wales.

He played for local Amateur teams Wrexham Nomads and Ruabon before retiring.

== Later career ==
He later became club secretary at Druids before becoming a director at Wrexham.

At the time of his death he lived at Croesnewydd Hall Farm, and was a partner in a building firm.

== Death ==
Davies' body was found in the River Dee at Overton in November 1949. The inquest into his death found that he had drowned, but returned an open verdict after learning of recent business problems he had been having.

== See also ==
- List of Wales international footballers (alphabetical)
