= George Thomas (footballer, born 1857) =

Welsh footballer

Personal information
- Date of birth: 1857
- Place of birth: Wales

Senior career*
Years	Team	Apps	(Gls)
1884–1885	Wrexham Olympic		

International career
1885	Wales	2	(0)
- * Club domestic league appearances and goals

George Thomas (1857 – ?) was a Welsh international footballer. He was part of the Wales national football team, playing 2 matches. He played his first match on 14 March 1885 against England and his last match on 23 March 1885 against Scotland. At club level, he played for Wrexham Olympic.

== See also ==
- List of Wales international footballers (alphabetical)
