= Llanerchrugog F.C. =

Football club in Rhosllanerchrugog, Wales (1876–1879)

Llanerchrugog
- Full name: Llanerchrugog Football Club
- Nickname(s): Rhos
- Founded: 1876
- Dissolved: 1879
- Ground: Llanerchrugog Park
- Secretary: Ll. de Powys Jones
Home colours

Llanerchrugog F.C. was a football club based in Rhosllanerchrugog, Wales.

== History ==
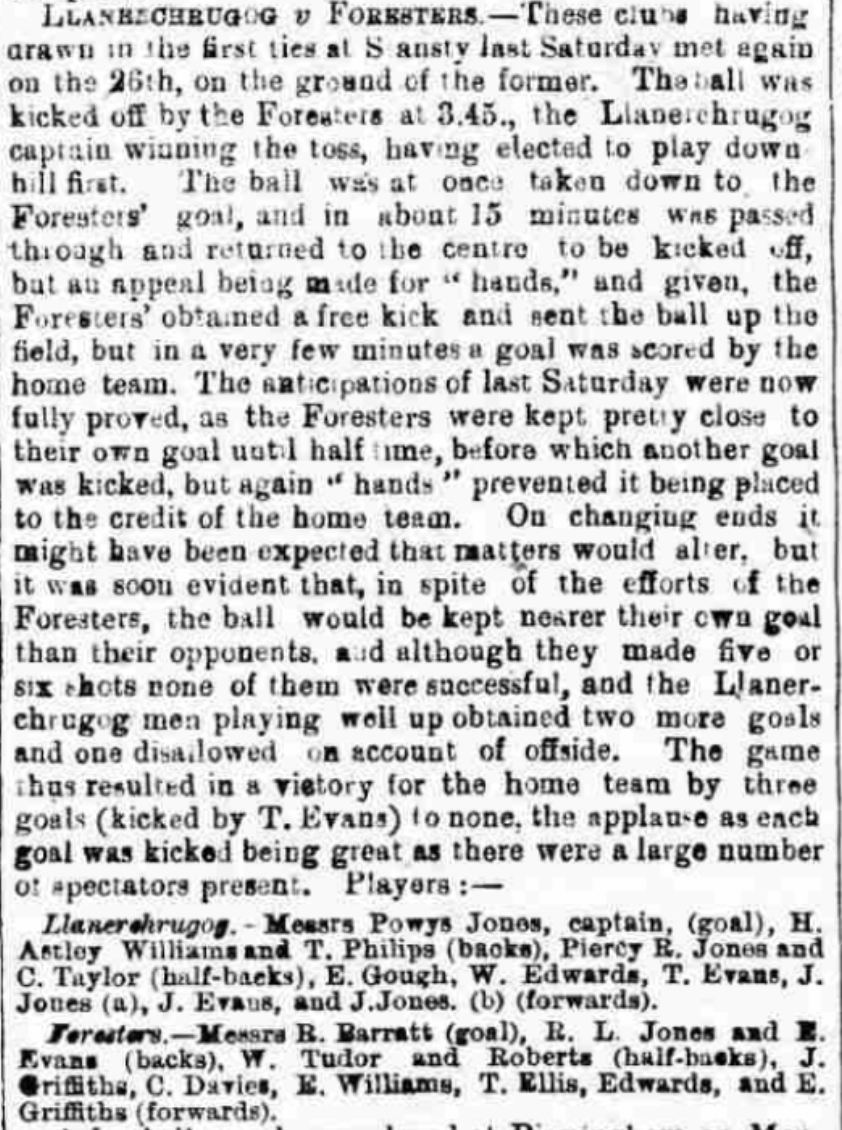
1878–79 Welsh Cup 1st round replay, Llanerchrugog 3–0 Gwersyllt Foresters, Wrexham Guardian, 2 November 1878

The club was formed in 1876, following a suggestion by the Wrexham Guardian in October that the miners in Rhosllanerchrugog would be as enthusiastic for the game as those who had made up the Druids club; the newspaper had even arranged a practice ground for any side, granted to a new club by a Mr Whalley. The club was duly "got up" by the Messrs. Jones of Llanerchrugog Hall, with one O'Connor as captain, and the club formally christened Llanerchrugog.

The club was sometimes known as Llanerchrugog Hall; the first recorded game for the club, a 1–0 defeat at home to the Civil Service (Wrexham) Cricket and Football Club in February (although the club disputed the goal as being offside), had the club's name in this form. It was also more simply sometimes reported as Rhos.

At the end of its first season, the club had 21 members, which increased to nearly 40 at the end of its second.

The club entered in the first two Welsh Cups, in 1877–78 and 1878–79. In 1877–78 it was lucky enough to receive a bye in the first round, even though four clubs entered after the first round draw had been made, as those four clubs were drawn separately against each other. In the second round, the club was drawn at home to Druids, and lost 3–0, the ground being in a "shocking" state.

The club had struggled through the season, its matches including a 5–0 defeat at Wrexham, but towards the end the side was "greatly improved", demonstrated by a 1–0 win over Llangollen on the Druids' Plasmadoc ground. The club also won through the first round in its second Welsh Cup entry, scoring an 84th-minute equalizer at Gwersyllt Foresters (having dominated the second half) and winning easily at home in the replay, thanks to a T. Evans hat-trick. However Llanerchrugog scratched when paired with Bangor in the second round, and although the club finished out the 1878–79 season, Powys Jones even representing the North Wales FA in goal against the Lancashire FA in February 1879, there is no further record of the club after the end of the season. A new town club was formed in 1889.

== Colours ==
The club wore blue jerseys and caps, white knickerbockers, and red stockings.

== Ground ==
The club played at the public Llanerchrugog Park, 2½ miles from Ruabon railway station. The site is now the home ground of Rhos Aelwyd.
