= White Stars F.C. =

Early association football club from north Wales

- Full name: White Stars Football Club
- Nickname: the Stars
- Founded: 1875
- Dissolved: 1881
- Ground: Welshpool Road
- Secretary: E. H. Morgan
Home colours

White Stars F.C., also known as White Star or Newtown White Stars, was an association football club from Newtown, Powys, active in the 1870s, and (indirectly) a progenitor club of the current Newtown club.

== History ==
=== Foundation ===
The club was formed at a meeting at the Greyhound Inn at a date variously given as 1873, 1874, or 1875; the club was certainly playing by 1876 as there was confusion between the White Stars and the Newtown club.

=== 1877–78 season ===
The White Stars entered the first Welsh Cup in 1877–78. The club won 1–0 at Ruabon in the first round and drew at Aberystwyth in the second, but Aberystwyth scratched from the replay and the Stars were drawn to play Druids at Plasmadoc in the "final five" stage. The White Stars played a defensive game in the tie to earn a home replay, which the White Stars won thanks to scrimmaging the only goal in the first half, but the result was overturned on appeal, on the basis that the home crowd kept coming onto the pitch every time the Druids threatened the White Stars' goal, and the referee failed to award a goal to Druids after a Ketley shot was only stopped behind the goal-line - and were not given a free-kick after goalkeeper Tom Jones carried the ball for several yards in the aftermath in contradiction to the laws at the time. Indeed a story was later bruited that the White Star supporters had been brandishing knives. The second replay was played at Oswestry and the Druids put the tie beyond any doubt with a 3–0 win.

=== Welsh Cup winner ===
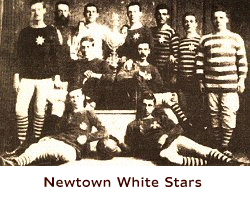
Newtown White Stars

The Stars gained ample compensation in the 1878–79 Welsh Cup. The club was not considered one of the stronger entries in the competition, but won through to the third round after two away wins. In the third, the club met Bangor at Wrexham, and after being two goals to the good, were forced into a replay after it conceded a bizarre late own-goal, defenders trying to get out of the way of a goal-bound throw-in but one inadvertently touching the ball en route. The replay, at Chester, ended in controversy; half-an-hour into the game, with the White Stars 3–1 up, a fight between two players on the pitch was interrupted by the Bangor umpire punching a White Star player to the ground, and the match abandoned. The Welsh Association ordered a replay, but Bangor refused to accept the decision, and resigned from the Welsh FA.

In club reached the semi-final, where it was drawn to play Newtown. The first match, at Oswestry, ended in a draw, and the replay, at Newtown's ground, went the White Stars' way 2–1, holding on after scoring twice in the first half-an-hour. The final against Wrexham was played at Oswestry, where the White Stars proved to be the favourites with the thousand-strong crowd, even though they were the outsiders; one expert stating that he would bet "Lombard Street to a bottle of pop" on the Wrexhamites. However the White Stars won 1–0, the winning goal coming on the hour when Rees followed up up after a Davies shot was saved.

=== Failed merger ===
Despite the Cup win, in August 1879, the White Stars' secretary wrote to his opposite number at Newtown with a view to fielding a combined club in the Welsh Cup. A new club, Excelsior, was duly formed, but although most of the Newtown players joined it, most of the White Stars remained aloof, or played for Excelsior in addition to the Stars.

The White Stars' defence of the Cup ended against the eventual winners Druids in the "semi" final (due to an imbalance in the draw, there were 3 teams remaining at the time) at Oswestry, the match being delayed by the referee not turning up and the clubs having to select a suitable individual from the crowd; the White Stars never recovered after conceding twice in the opening nine minutes. By this time White Stars was in the process of swallowing Excelsior - the clubs met in February 1880, White Stars winning by 4 (or 5) goals to nil, and by the 1880–81 season many of the former Newtown players(such as goalkeeper Hibbott, captain Edward Morgan, and forward Gittins) were all playing for the White Stars.

=== Final season and revival as Newtown ===
More players joined the White Stars later in the season, in time to play for the White Stars in the 1881 Welsh Cup final on Wrexham's Racecourse Ground. The match attracted a crowd of 3,000, of whom 700 had come on special trains from Newtown. Druids again proved to be the White Stars' nemesis, winning 2–0, the second goal coming when Hibbott was charged through the goal having just caught a Vaughan shot.

The White Stars protested the eligibility of the Druids' captain Jack Powell, to no avail. The failure of the protest seems to have dispirited the team to the extent that it did not re-emerge for the 1881–82 season. Indeed, football in Newtown went into abeyance until a meeting at the Lion Hotel on 23 July 1884 re-established a Newtown association football club. Notably, many of those involved with the new club, including players Hibbott, Owen, W. Andrew, D. Andrew, George Woosnam, Rees, and Gittins, and committee member Cornelius Morgan, had been involved with the previous Newtown clubs.

== Colours ==
Originally, the club did not rely on coloured jerseys to distinguish its players, but a motif sewn onto a jersey (and, originally, cap) of any colour, namely the white star from which the club took its name. Its official colours were (in 1878–79) blue, (in 1879–80) navy blue & white, and (in 1880–81) black & white.

== Ground ==
The club's ground was on Welshpool Road, a four-minute walk from Newtown railway station, with the Excelsior ground lying beyond.

== Notable players ==
- Harry Hibbott and George Woosnam both picked up international caps while with the White Stars.
