= 1880–81 Welsh Cup =

Tournament details
- Country: Wales

Final positions
- Champions: Druids
- Runners-up: Newtown White Star

== First round ==
Shrewsbury Engineers	0 – 0^{1}	Newtown White Star

Llanidloes	5 – 0	Oswestry

Dolgellau Idris	0 – 1	Ruthin

Druids	3 – 1	Llangollen	Ruabon

Northwich Victoria	3 – 0	Wrexham Grosvenor

Mold	0 – 1^{2}	Wrexham

Civil Service (Wrexham)	3 – 1	Gwersyllt Foresters

Source: Welsh Football Data Archive

Chirk receive a bye to the next round.

^{1}At the Racecourse Ground, Wrexham. First match was protested by Engineers regarding referee eligibility. White Star had won the first match 1–0.

=== Replay ===
Newtown White Star	1 – 0	Shrewsbury Engineers

== Second round ==
Ruthin	1 – 1^{1}	Druids

Newtown White Star	2 – 1	Wrexham	Rhosddu Recreation Ground; Wrexham

Llanidloes	1 – 0	Civil Service (Wrexham)

Northwich Victoria	2 – 1	Chirk

Source: Welsh Football Data Archive

^{1}Ruthin withdrew before replay.

== Semi-final ==
Druids	3 – 0	Northwich Victoria	Racecourse Grounds; Wrexham

Newtown White Star	2 – 0	Llanidloes	Rhosddu Recreation Ground; Wrexham

Source: Welsh Football Data Archive

== Final ==
26 March 1881
15:55

Druids	2 – 0	Newtown White Star
J Vaughan 27' 72'

Racecourse Ground, Wrexham
Attendance: 4,000
Referee: C Crump (Wolverhampton)

Druids	Newtown White Star
