= 1881–82 Welsh Cup =

1881–82 Welsh Football Association Challenge Cup
Welsh Senior Cup

Tournament details
- Country: Wales

Final positions
- Champions: Druids
- Runners-up: Northwich Victoria

The 1881–82 Football Association of Wales Challenge Cup was the fifth season of the competition.

== First round ==
=== Group One ===
Hartford St. Johns	1 – 3	Gwersyllt Foresters	Hartford, Cheshire

Holywell	0 – 3	Northwich Victoria 'A'	Ffordd Fer, Holywell

Wrexham Athletic 'A'	4 – 1	Rhyl	Wrexham

Equitable (Coedpoeth)	3 – 4	Flintshire Wanderers (Mold)	Coedpoeth

Source: Welsh Football Data Archive

=== Group Two ===
Wrexham Athletic 'B'	2 – 1	Hare & Hounds (Wrexham)	Wrexham

Northwich Victoria 'B'	w/o	Ruthin	Ruthin

Dolgelley Idris	0 – 6	Druids 'A'	Dolgelley

Rhostyllen Victoria	6 – 2	Corwen Mountaineers	Rhostyllen

Source: Welsh Football Data Archive

=== Group Three ===
Aberystwyth	2 – 0	Druids B

Shrewsbury Castle Blues	1 – 0	Welshpool Warriors

Chirk	4 – 3	Oswestry White Stars

Berwyn Rangers	4 – 0	Oswestry

Source: Welsh Football Data Archive

== Second round ==
=== Group A ===
Wrexham Athletic	2 – 0	Equitable	Coedpoeth

Northwich Victoria	7 – 0	Mold

Source: Welsh Football Data Archive

Gwersyllt Foresters receive a bye to the next round.

=== Group B ===
Wrexham Athletic B	0 – 5	Druids

Ruthin	11 – 0	Rhostyllen Victoria

Source: Welsh Football Data Archive

=== Group C ===
Aberystwyth	3 – 1	Shrewsbury Castle Blues

Oswestry	2 – 1	Chirk

Source: Welsh Football Data Archive

=== Replay ===
Oswestry White Stars	1 – 2	Chirk

Source: Welsh Football Data Archive

== Third round ==
Druids	0 – 0	Ruthin	Racecourse Ground; Wrexham

Chirk	2 – 1	Aberystwyth	Newtown

Wrexham Athletic	0 – 0	Northwich Victoria	Racecourse Ground; Wrexham

Source: Welsh Football Data Archive

=== Replay ===
Druids	2 – 1	Ruthin	Racecourse Ground; Wrexham
Heywood, Joberts		60'	Attendance: 3,000

Wrexham Athletic	1 – 5	Northwich Victoria	Wynnstay Park

Source: Welsh Football Data Archive

== Semi-final ==
Chirk	2 – 2	Northwich Victoria	Racecourse Grounds; Wrexham

Source: Welsh Football Data Archive

Druids receive a bye ito the final.

=== Replay ===
Chirk	1 – 5	Northwich Victoria	Racecourse Ground; Wrexham

Source: Welsh Football Data Archive

== Final ==
April 8, 1882
16:00

Druids	5 – 0	Northwich Victoria
Ketley 20' (45), Bowen 41', o.g.

Racecourse Ground, Wrexham
Attendance: 2,000
Referee: Mr Hindle (Darwen)

Druids	Northwich Victoria
