= Rhosddu Recreation Ground =

Former Welsh football ground

- Interactive map of Rhosddu Recreation Ground
- Location: Wrexham, Wales
- Coordinates: 53.0566°N 2.9960°W
- Surface: Grass

Construction
- Opened: 1879
- Closed: 1886

Tenants
- Civil Service (Wrexham) (1879-1880); Wrexham Excelsior (1880-1885); Wrexham Crown (1883); Wrexham (1881-1883)

Rhosddu Recreation Ground was a football ground in Wrexham, Wales. It was first mentioned in the local press in September 1879 as the New Recreation Ground, Rhosddu, prior to a game between Civil Service (Wrexham) and Gwersyllt Foresters.

It was the home ground of Wrexham between 1881 and 1883. It hosted home games of Wrexham Civil Service, Wrexham Excelsior, Wrexham Albion and Wrexham Victoria to name a few.

It was last used for football in 1885.
