= Hartford St John's F.C. =

Hartford St John's
- Full name: Hartford St John's Football Club
- Nickname(s): the Saints
- Founded: 1876
- Dissolved: 1889
- Ground: Red Lion
- Secretary: Henry Booth, J. Colley
Home colours

Hartford St John's Football Club was an English football club from the village of Hartford in Cheshire.

== History ==
=== Original club ===
The club was founded in 1876, and the first recorded match for the club was a defeat to Northwich Victoria, for a prize worth £3 3s offered by the Northwich Floral & Horticultural Society, in 1877.

In 1878, the club was one of the founder members of the Cheshire Football Association, along with Crewe Alexandra, Northwich Victoria, Macclesfield and Wincham.

The club reached the final of the Cheshire Senior Cup in 1880–81, losing to Northwich Victoria. This was the club's only successful run in any competition; the club entered the FA Cup every year from 1883–84 to 1886–87, losing in the first round every time. The club took Newtown to a replay in 1885–86 and even this was considered a shock result.

Given the proximity to the border with Wales, the Saints also entered the Welsh Cup from 1881–82 to 1885–86 (except for 1884–85). The club lost every match it played, other than a remarkable win over Crown FC from Wrexham in the first round in 1882–83, given as "by seven goals and two disputed to nil", with Wilding scoring a hat-trick.

Even at the more parochial level of the Cheshire Cup, the club was not successful. Apart from its runner-up finish, the club's best run was in 1884–85. It reached the semi-final, but lost 5–2 to Northwich Victoria; the game ended after 80 minutes, after a kick at a prostrate player resulted in a brawl and Hartford leaving the pitch.

By 1887–88 the club had "through decimation and other circumstances" given up on senior football, and lost 7–0 at Northwich Swifts in the second round of the Cheshire Cup. The club did try one more time in the FA Cup in the qualifying rounds of 1888–89, but again lost at the first time of asking, 7–1 at home to Nantwich.

At the end of the 1888–89 season, the club merged with Davenham F.C., a club from the next village to the east up the Chester Road, and played for a season as Hartford & Davenham United, reaching the third round of the Welsh Cup. This new entity lasted just one season, as in 1890 the new club merged with Northwich Victoria, taking on the latter's name.

=== Revival ===
In 1896, the name was revived for a new club which joined the Nantwich & District League; at the end of the first season, the club resolved to join the Cheshire League.

The club's second season in the league (1898–99) proved to be its downfall as, paradoxically, it was too successful. With a handful of matches to go, the Saints were top of the table, but this meant that bigger and richer clubs were scouting out the team's players. Northwich Victoria took two players with no notice, which meant the team had to use replacements who were not registered with the league, costing the club two points. The club then had to forfeit a match to Barnton Albion because half of the team had supposedly gone to watch Aston Villa instead.

Despite a high finish in the table, the club made a loss of £2 7s, and at the season's close players "scattered in all directions". The club therefore told the Cheshire League it needed to be demoted to the new second division for 1899–1900 but it did not see out the year; the club's last match was a 3–0 defeat in a friendly with Barnton United in December.

The name Hartford St John's was later used by a church team in ecclesiastical-based competition.

== Colours ==
The club's colours were black and white.

== Ground ==
The club's ground was at the Red Lion Hotel in Hartford.
