= Civil Service (Wrexham) Cricket and Football Club =

Former association football club in Wales

Civil Service (Wrexham)
- Full name: Civil Service (Wrexham) Cricket and Football Club
- Founded: c. 1876
- Dissolved: c. 1882
- Ground: Rhosddu Recreation Ground
Home colours

Civil Service (Wrexham) were a Welsh football and cricket club from Wrexham.

== History ==
Civil Service (Wrexham) first appear in the local press in May 1876 among the Cricket fixtures. The following year the football team participated in the inaugural Welsh Cup competition.

== Cup history ==
| Season | Competition | Round | Opposition | Score |
|---|---|---|---|---|
| 1877-78 | Welsh Cup | First Round | Wrexham | 1-3 |
| 1878-79 | Welsh Cup | First Round | Druids | w/o |
| 1878-79 | Welsh Cup | Second Round | Oswestry | 0-6 |
| 1879-80 | Welsh Cup | First Round | Gwersyllt Foresters | 1-1 |
| 1879-80 | Welsh Cup | First Round Replay | Gwersyllt Foresters | 1-2 |
| 1880-81 | Welsh Cup | First Round | Gwersyllt Foresters | 3-1 |
| 1880-81 | Welsh Cup | Second Round | Llanidloes | 0-1 |

== Notable players ==
- Henry Edwards - Wales Football International
- John Price - Wales Football International
