= Gwersyllt Foresters F.C. =

Former association football club in Wales

- Full name: Gwersyllt Foresters Football Club
- Nickname: Foresters
- Founded: April 1877
- Dissolved: c. 1885
- Ground: Gwersyllt Park
Home colours	Away colours

Gwersyllt Foresters were a Welsh football team from the village of Gwersyllt, Wrexham.

== History ==
Foresters were formed in April 1877 and participated in the inaugural Welsh Cup competition. They played their home games at Gwersyllt Park, and their colours are recorded as being green and red. Their first match was against Wrexham on 6 October 1877, a 9–0 defeat where Gwersyllt played in Red and Blue stripes. No record of them exists beyond November 1884.

== Cup History ==
Season	Competition	Round	Opposition	Score
1877–78	Welsh Cup	Round 1	Northwich Victoria	0–0
1877–78	Welsh Cup	Round 1 Replay	Northwich Victoria	4–1
1877–78	Welsh Cup	Round 2	Llangollen	2–1
1877–78	Welsh Cup	Round 3	Wrexham	0–8
1878–79	Welsh Cup	Round 1	Rhosllanerchrugog	1–1
1878–79	Welsh Cup	Round 1 Replay	Rhosllanerchrugog	0–3
1879–80	Welsh Cup	Round 1	Civil Service (Wrexham)	1–1
1879–80	Welsh Cup	Round 1 Replay	Civil Service (Wrexham)	1–1
1879–80	Welsh Cup	Round 1 Second Replay	Civil Service (Wrexham)	2–1
1879–80	Welsh Cup	Round 2	Newtown White Stars	0–2
1880–81	Welsh Cup	Round 1	Civil Service (Wrexham)	1–3
1881–82	Welsh Cup	Round 1	Hartford St John's	3–1
1881–82	Welsh Cup	Round 2	Bye	
1883–84	Welsh Cup	Round 1	Hare & Hounds (Wrexham)	6–5
1883–84	Welsh Cup	Round 2	Druids	1–7

== Colours ==
October 1877 v Wrexham	November 1877 v Northwich

Gwersyllt Foresters were reported as playing in Green and Red against Northwich, however the actual design of the kit is unknown.
