= 1877–78 Welsh Cup =

Tournament details
- Country: Wales
- Teams: 18

Final positions
- Champions: Wrexham
- Runners-up: Druids

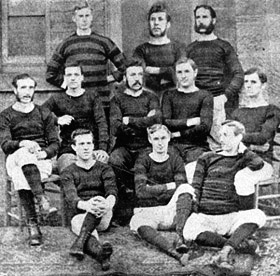
The Wrexham side that won the first Welsh Cup in 1878

The 1877–78 Welsh Cup was the first season of the Welsh Cup. The cup was won by Wrexham who defeated Druids 1–0 in the final.

== First round ==
13 October 1877	Newtown	1 – 1	Druids	Racecourse, Newtown
14:30			Daniel Grey 87'

20 October 1877	Wrexham	3 – 1	Civil Service (Wrexham)	Racecourse Ground, Wrexham
15:15

20 October 1877	Bangor	1 – 0	Carnarvon Athletic	Maes-y-dre, Bangor
15:00

27 October 1877	Newtown White Star	1 – 0	Ruabon

3 November 1877	Oswestry	12 – 0	Chirk
				Referee: W. H. Wimble

3 November 1877	Northwich Victoria	0 – 0	Gwersyllt Foresters	Hill Field, Northwich
15:00				Attendance: 600

10 November 1877	Corwen	0 – 0	Bala

Swansea RFC	w/o	Aberystwyth Town

23rd Royal Welch Fusiliers	w/o	Llangollen

Source: Welsh Football Data Archive

=== Replay ===
27 October 1877	Druids	4 – 0	Newtown	Plasmadoc Park
15:00

10 November 1877	Gwersyllt Foresters	4 – 1	Northwich Victoria	Gwersyllt Park, Gwersyllt

14 November 1877	Corwen	0 – 0	Bala

Source: Welsh Football Data Archive

=== Second replay ===
17 November 1877	Corwen	1 – 0	Bala

Source: Welsh Football Data Archive

Llanerchrugog received a bye to the next round

- Believing that it was a Rugby Union competition Swansea RFC scratched to Aberystwyth when officials learned that it was one for football.

== Second round ==
15 December 1877	Corwen	0 – 7	Bangor

22 December 1877	Wrexham	1 – 1	Oswestry	The Racecourse, Wrexham
14:45				Referee: Burgess, Wrexham

28 December 1877	Gwersyllt Foresters	2 – 1	Llangollen

5 January 1878	Druids	3 – 0	Llanerchrugog

Aberystwyth Town	w/o	Newtown White Star

Source: Welsh Football Data Archive

=== Replay ===
5 January 1878	Oswestry	0 – 2	Wrexham	Cricket Field, Oswestry
			C. Edwards, J. Price	Referee: Mr. Burgess, Wrexham

Source: Welsh Football Data Archive

== Third round ==
2 February 1878	Druids	1 – 1	Newtown White Star
14:30

9 February 1878	Gwersyllt Foresters	0 – 8	Wrexham	Gwersyllt Park, Gwersyllt
15:15			J. Davies 24'	Attendance: 500; Referee: Powys Jones

Source: Welsh Football Data Archive

=== Replay ===
9 February 1878	Newtown White Star	1 – 1	Druids	Newtown
14:30

Source: Welsh Football Data Archive

=== Second replay ===
23 February 1878	Druids	3 – 0	Newtown White Star	Racecourse Ground, Wrexham

Source: Welsh Football Data Archive

Bangor receive bye to next round

== Semi-final ==
2 March 1878	Bangor	0 – 0	Druids	Racecourse Ground, Wrexham

Source: Welsh Football Data Archive

=== Replay ===
9 March 1878	Bangor	0 – 1 (a.e.t.)	Druids	Rhyl
			Dr Daniel Grey 115'

Source: Welsh Football Data Archive

Wrexham receive bye to next round

== Final ==
The final of the inaugural Welsh Cup tournament was played at Acton Park, Wrexham on 30 March 1878 between Wrexham and Druids of Ruabon. The match was a cliffhanger, with no score until the Wrexham forwards charged the Druids' defenders to take the ball over the line to win the game in the final minute, with James Davies being credited with the goal.

30 March 1878
16:00

Wrexham	1 – 0	Druids
James Davies 90'

Acton Park, Wrexham
Attendance: 1,500
Referee: J W Thomas (Stoke)

Wrexham	Druids
