= George Woosnam =

Welsh footballer

Personal information
- Date of birth: April 1860
- Place of birth: Newtown, Wales
- Date of death: December 1935 (aged 75)
- Place of death: Newtown, Wales
- Position: Forward

Senior career*
| Years | Team | Apps | (Gls) |
| 1877–1880 | Newtown White Star | | |

International career
| 1879 | Wales | 1 | (0) |
- * Club domestic league appearances and goals

George Woosnam (April 1860 – December 1935) was a Welsh international footballer. He was part of the Wales national football team, playing one match on 7 April 1879 against Scotland.

== See also ==
- List of Wales international footballers (alphabetical)
