= James Davies (footballer, born 1845) =

Welsh footballer

Personal information
- Date of birth: 1845
- Place of birth: Wales
- Date of death: March 1910 (aged 64–65)
- Place of death: Wrexham, Wales

Senior career*
Years	Team	Apps	(Gls)
1874-1881	Wrexham		

International career
1878	Wales	1	(0)
- * Club domestic league appearances and goals

James Davies (1845–1910) was a Welsh international footballer. He was part of the Wales national football team, playing 1 match on 23 March 1878 against Scotland.

== Career ==
At club level James Davies played for Wrexham. He scored the winning goal in the first Welsh Cup Final, when Wrexham defeated Druids 1–0 at Acton Park, Wrexham.

In September 1890, Davies became Chairman of the Welsh League. Davies also acted as local referee.

Davies became President of the Football Association of Wales in September 1891.

== Personal life ==
Davies lived in Percy Road, Wrexham and was employed as a Stonemason who worked at the old Beast Market. He was also part of the volunteer fire service and a member of Wrexham Cricket Club.

== Honours ==
=== Wrexham ===
- Welsh Cup
  - Winners: 1877–78

== See also ==
- List of Wales international footballers (alphabetical)
