= 1878–79 Welsh Cup =

Tournament details
- Country: Wales

Final positions
- Champions: Newtown White Star
- Runners-up: Wrexham

The 1878–79 Welsh Cup was the second season of the Welsh Cup. The cup was won by Newtown White Star who defeated Wrexham 1–0 in the final.

== First round ==
19 October 1878	Corwen	0 – 2	Wrexham	Corwen

19 October 1878	Gwersyllt Foresters	1 – 1	Llanerchrugog	Stansty Park
		Report

19 October 1878	Llangollen	8 – 1	Mold

19 October 1878	Aberystwyth Town	1 – 4	Newtown

19 October 1878	All Saints (Salop)	0 – 2	Newtown White Star	Racecourse, Shrewsbury
			Rees; D. Jones

26 October 1878	Carnarvon Athletic	0 – 1	Bangor	Caernarvon
15:00

26 October 1878	Friars School	1 – 0	Rhyl	Maes-y-dre, Bangor
15:00

26 October 1878	Chirk	1 – 0	Ruabon

Druids	w/o	Civil Service (Wrexham)

23rd Royal Welch Fusiliers	w/o	Trinity Shrewsbury

Source: Welsh Football Data Archive

=== Replay ===
26 October 1878	Llanerchrugog	3 – 0	Gwersyllt Foresters

Source: Welsh Football Data Archive

Oswestry receive a bye to the next round

== Second round ==
Llanerchrugog	w/o	Bangor

Chirk	1 – 0	Trinity Shrewsbury

Llangollen	0 – 1	Newtown White Star

27 November 1878	Friars School	1 – 3	Wrexham	School Ground, Bangor
		Report

Oswestry	6 – 0	Civil Service (Wrexham)

Source: Welsh Football Data Archive

Newtown receive bye into next round

== Third round ==
Newtown	3 – 1	Chirk

Bangor	2 – 2	Newtown White Star	Wrexham

Source: Welsh Football Data Archive

=== Replay ===
Bangor	A – A	Newtown White Star	Chester

The replay was abandoned after half-an-hour, with the White Stars 3–1 up, after the Bangor umpire punched a White Stars player. The WFA ordered a replay but Bangor refused to play.

Wrexham received a bye to the next round.

== Semi-final ==
22 February 1879	Newtown White Star	1 – 1	Newtown	Oswestry
14:00

25 January 1879	Wrexham	2 – 0	Oswestry	Salisbury Park, Wrexham
14:50		Report		Attendance: 1,500; Referee: T. B. Burnett, Ruabon

Source: Welsh Football Data Archive

=== Replay ===
Newtown	1 – 3	Newtown White Star	Rhyl
		Dr D Gray ??'

Source: Welsh Football Data Archive

== Final ==
29 March 1879
16:00

Newtown White Star	1 – 0	Wrexham
E Rees 60'

Cricket Field, Oswestry
Attendance: 2,500
Referee: A E Daniel (Birmingham)

Newtown White Star	Wrexham
