= Vale of Llangollen F.C. =

Former association football club in Wales

Vale of Llangollen
- Full name: Vale of Llangollen Football Club
- Founded: 1887
- Dissolved: 1889
- Ground: Cricket Field
- Secretary: J. P. Davies

Vale of Llangollen Football Club were a Welsh football team from Llangollen, Denbighshire.

== History ==
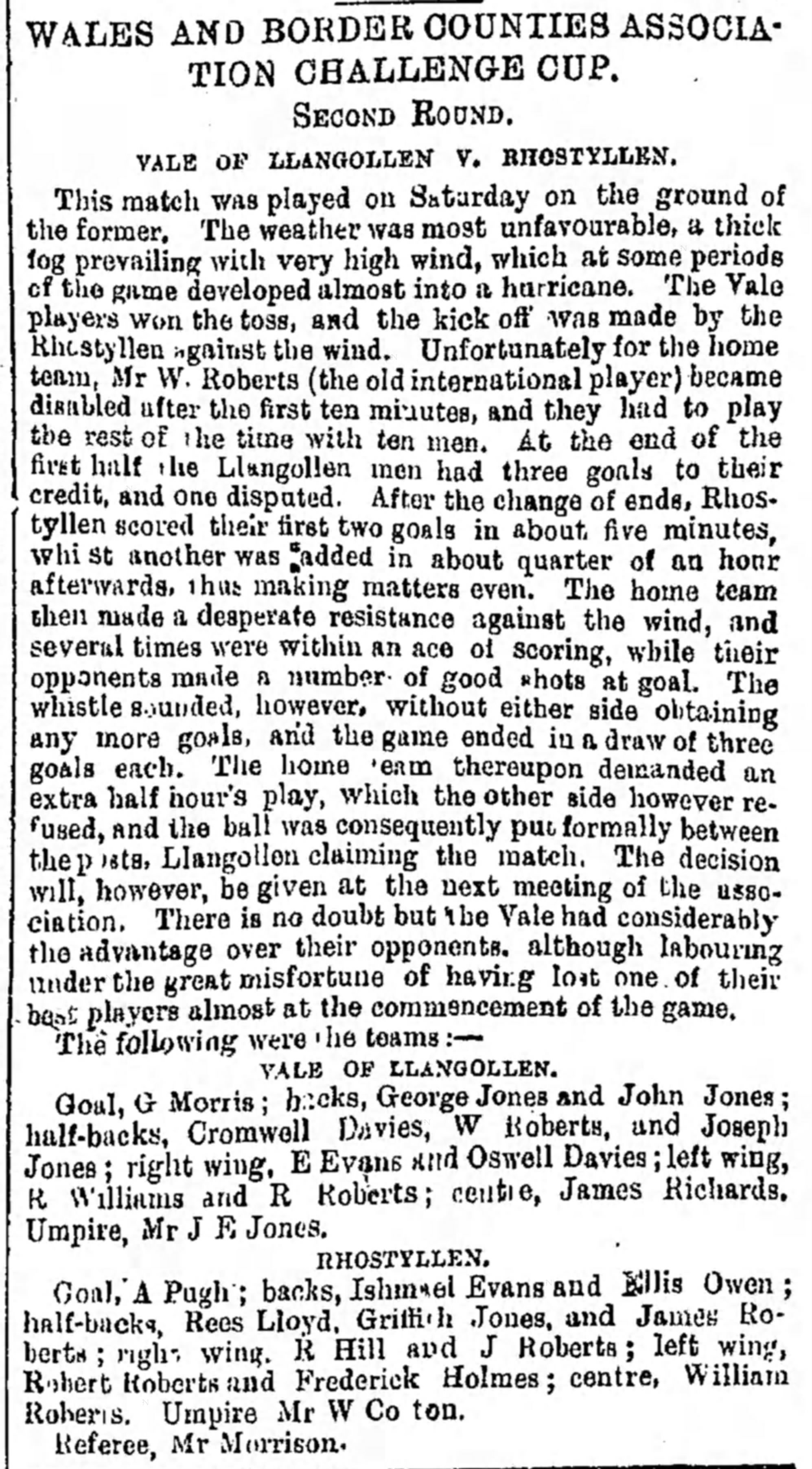
1888–89 Welsh Cup 2nd Round, Vale of Llangollen 3–3 Rhostyllen Victoria, North Wales Chronicle, 17 November 1888

The earliest reference to the club is its entry to the 1887–88 FA Cup. It seems to have arisen out of the ashes of Berwyn Rangers, as its players included former Rangers players John Roberts, William Roberts, and John Jones, and secretary-player John Price Davies had also come over from Berwyn.

The club was drawn at home to Oswestry in the first round of the Cup, and lost 3–1; Vale protested that Oswestry had not registered all of its players, and the match was re-played in Llangollen a fortnight later Oswestry - presumably having sorted the registration issues - fielded the same XI, and won again 2–0; the Vale was compromised as Oswald Davies, who had scored in the original match, was injured and unable to play.

It won in its first appearance in the Welsh Cup (for local purposes generally referred to as Llangollen), the same season, with an easy 4–1 win over Wrexham Excelsior, "Bob" Roberts scoring twice and the Excelsior goal - scored at the death - being blamed on darkness. Vale overturned a defeat to Wrexham Olympic in the second round as the Olympic ground had not been properly closed; Llangollen won the replay at home 2–1. Olympic made a counter-protest on several grounds, including there being spectator interference, one of the half-backs wearing the wrong colour shirt, and the goalposts being the wrong size; the protest was dismissed, Wrexham blaming the decision on the hostility of Druids F.C. committee members. Llangollen lost at eventual winners Chirk in the third round.

1888–89 was the club's last competitive season. It gained revenge over Oswestry in the 1888–89 FA Cup qualifying rounds with a 6–4 win, but in the next round at Chester, the club lost its goalkeeper to injury early on, and one other player was ordered off for wearing illegally-studded boots; the club thereupon lost 5–1. As was the Vale's wont, it protested the defeat, which the Football Association ruled "very frivolous" and the FA retained the two guinea deposit, as well as ordering the club to pay Chester's expenses of £1 1/. It also lost its first tie in the 1888–89 Welsh Cup, drawing 3–3 with Rhostyllen Victoria (having turned around at half-time three goals to the good), but having lost William Roberts after 10 minutes through injury; the Vale unsuccessfully claimed the tie after Victoria refused to play extra time, and Victoria won the replay.

The club did not enter the FA Cup in 1889–90, and had fallen well off the pace over the close season; its last recorded matches were an 8–0 defeat to Chester St Oswald's in October 1889 and an 8–2 defeat at Rhostyllen Victoria in the first round of the 1889–90 Welsh Cup, having only turned up with 10 men.

== Ground ==
The club played on the Llangollen Cricket Field.
