= 1885–86 Welsh Cup =

1885–86 Football Association of Wales Challenge Cup
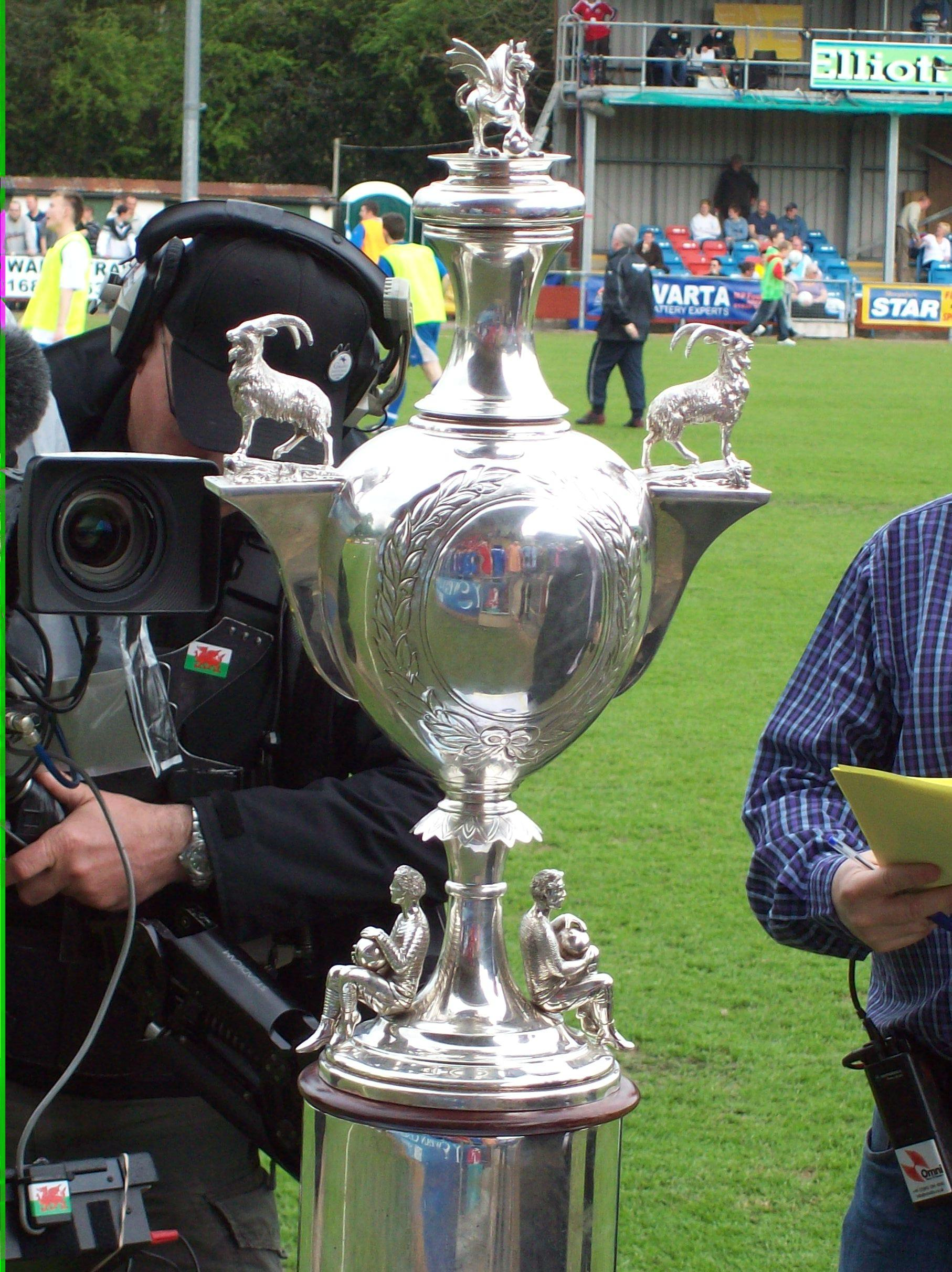
- The Welsh Cup

Tournament details
- Country: Wales

Final positions
- Champions: Druids
- Runners-up: Newtown

The 1885–86 FAW Welsh Cup was the ninth edition of the annual knockout tournament for competitive football teams in Wales.

== First round ==
Rhostyllen Victoria	1 – 2	Berwyn Rangers

Druids	5 – 1	Chirk

Wrexham Olympic	1 – 5	Ellesmere

Shrewsbury Castle Blues	6 – 0	Trefonen

Oswestry	1 – 2	Newtown

Welshpool Town	5 – 2	Vyrnwy United

Llanfyllin Town	8 – 0	Wem White Stars

Chester	0 – 3	Crewe Britannia

Davenham	0 – 2	Northwich Victoria

Crewe Alexandra	7 – 1	Hartford St John's

Porthmadog	2 – 1	Carnarvon Athletic

Rhyl	1 – 4	Bangor City

=== Replays ===
Rhostyllen Victoria	2 – 1	Berwyn Rangers

== Second round ==
Druids	7 – 1	Ellesmere

Rhostyllen Victoria	bye

Welshpool Town	0 – 0	Newtown

Shrewsbury Castle Blues	3 – 0	Llanfyllin Town	Llanfyllin

Crewe Alexandra	5 – 1	Crewe Britannia

Northwich Victoria	bye

Porthmadog	0 – 4	Bangor City

=== Replays ===
Welshpool Town	0 – 4	Newtown

== Third round ==
Rhostyllen Victoria	0 – 0	Druids

Shrewsbury Castle Blues	1 – 1	Newtown

Crewe Alexandra	1 – 1	Northwich Victoria

Bangor City	bye

=== Replays ===
Rhostyllen Victoria	1 – 5	Druids

Shrewsbury Castle Blues	0 – 2	Newtown

Crewe Alexandra	1 – 1	Northwich Victoria

Crewe Alexandra	2 – 1	Northwich Victoria

== Semifinals ==
Bangor City	0 – 0	Newtown

Druids	3 – 0	Crewe Alexandra	Racecourse Ground

=== Replays ===
Bangor City	0 – 0	Newtown	Chester

Bangor City	0 – 2	Newtown	Racecourse Ground

== Final ==
3 April 1886	Druids	4 – 0	Newtown	Racecourse Ground
	J Vaughan' (2 goals); E Bowen'; J Doughty'			Attendance: 2,000; Referee: T Sloan (Liverpool)
