= 1886–87 Welsh Cup =

1886–87 Football Association of Wales Challenge Cup
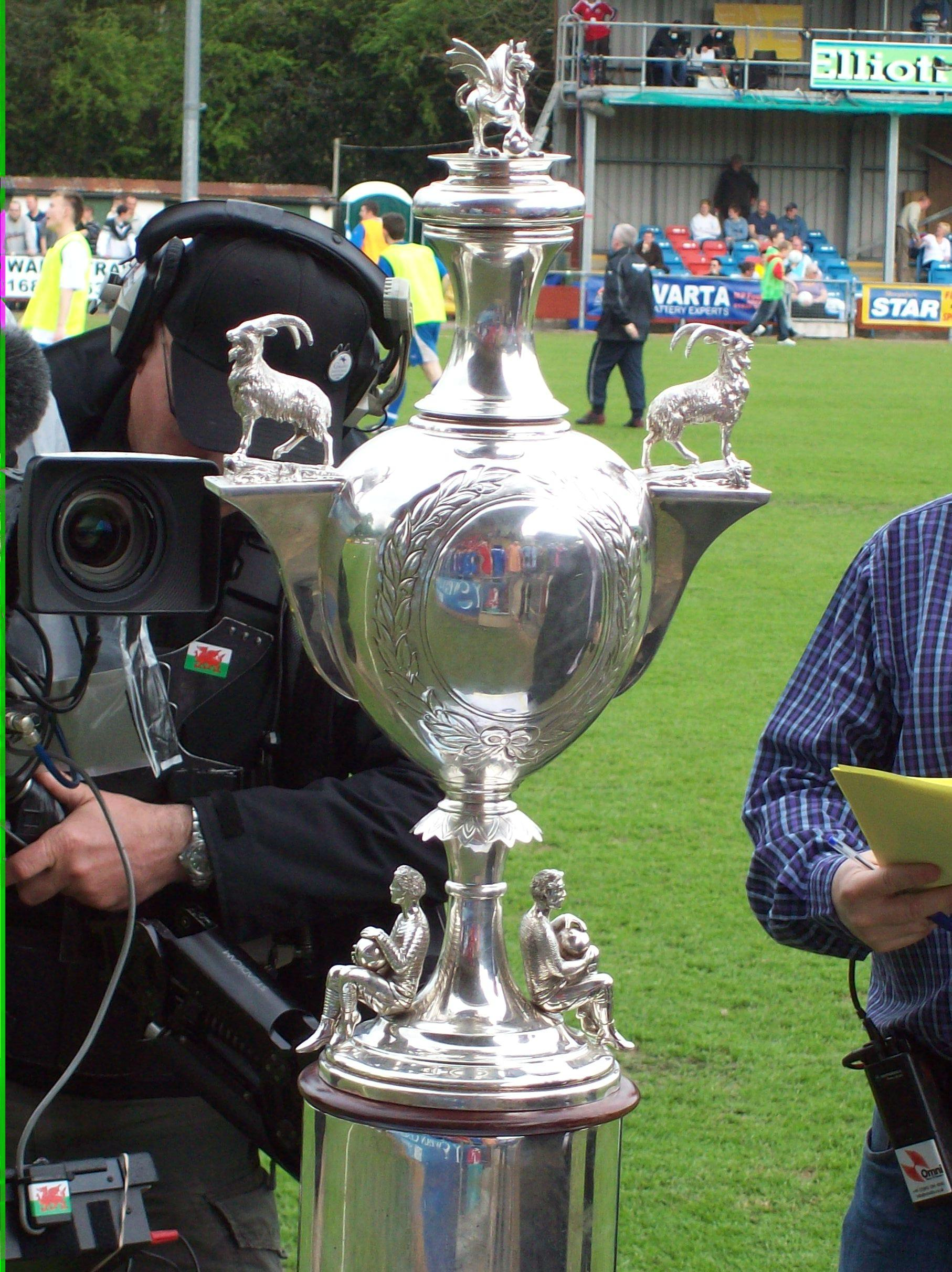
- The Welsh Cup

Tournament details
- Country: Wales

Final positions
- Champions: Chirk AAA
- Runners-up: Davenham

The 1886–87 FAW Welsh Cup was the tenth edition of the annual knockout tournament for competitive football teams in Wales.

== First round ==
Over Wanderers	0 – 3	Northwich Victoria

Chester	4 – 2	Hartford St John's

Davenham	w/o from	Crewe Alexandra

Carnarvon Wanderers	3 – 1	Porthmadog

Llandudno Gloddaeth	8 – 0	Rhyl

Bangor City	bye

Oswestry	4 – 0	Oswestry Cambrians

Llanfyllin Town	vs.	Aberystwyth Town

- The match was scratched.

Wem White Stars	0 – 10	Shrewsbury Town

Newtown	14 – 0	Welshpool Town

Vyrnwy United	bye

Chirk	10 – 1	Wrexham Excelsior

Ellesmere	0 – 7	Wrexham Olympic

Druids	1 – 4	Rhostyllen Victoria

== Second round ==
Davenham	0 – 0	Chester

Northwich Victoria	bye

Llandudno Gloddaeth	2 – 7	Bangor City

Carnarvon Wanderers	bye

Vyrnwy United	1 – 7	Llanfyllin Town

Shrewsbury Town	0 – 1	Newtown

Druids	0 – 1	Chirk

Wrexham Olympic	bye

=== Replay ===
Davenham	2 – 1	Chester

== Third round ==
Northwich Victoria	1 – 1	Davenham

Carnarvon Wanderers	2 – 7	Bangor City

Oswestry	1 – 1	Newtown

Wrexham Olympic	1 – 8	Chirk

=== Replays ===
Northwich Victoria	0 – 1	Davenham

Oswestry	2 – 1 (aet)	Newtown

== Fourth round ==
Davenham	bye

Bangor City	bye

Chirk	bye

Llanfyllin Town	0 – 2	Oswestry

== Semifinals ==
Chirk	2 – 2	Bangor City

Davenham	2 – 1	Oswestry	Crewe

=== Replays ===
Chirk	2 – 0	Bangor City	Racecourse Ground

Chirk	2 – 0	Bangor City	Racecourse Ground

== Final ==
16 April 1887	Chirk	2 – 1	Davenham	Nantwich Road, Crewe
	W Owen' (2 goals)		H Holland'	Attendance: 1,500; Referee: W. H. Jope (Wednesbury)
