= 1890–91 Welsh Cup =

1890–91 Football Association of Wales Challenge Cup
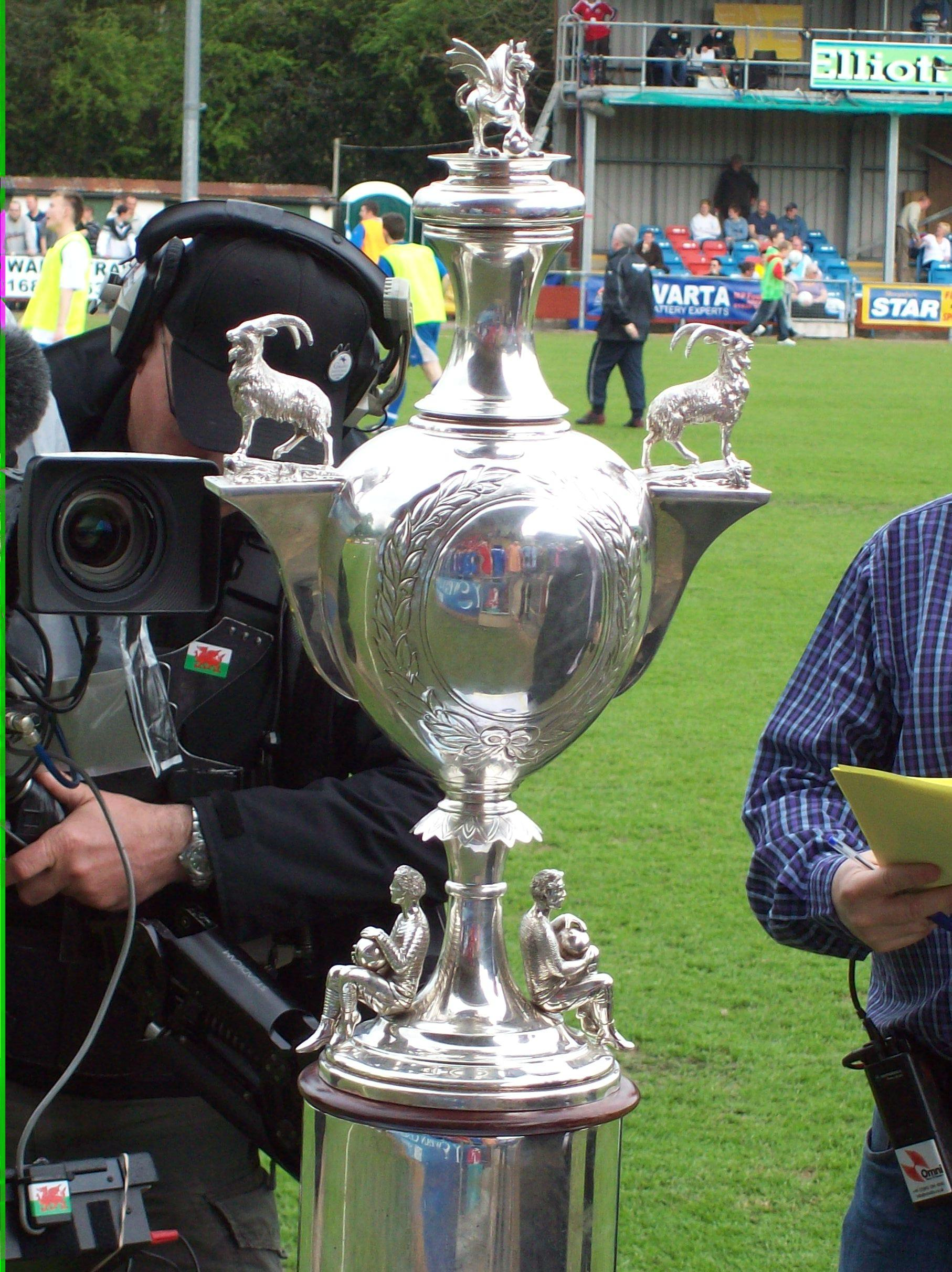
- The Welsh Cup

Tournament details
- Country: Wales

Final positions
- Champions: Shrewsbury Town
- Runners-up: Wrexham

The 1890–91 FAW Welsh Cup was the 14th edition of the annual knockout tournament for competitive football teams in Wales. The competition was won by Shrewsbury Town.

== First round ==
Home team	Result	Away team	Remarks
Mold	3–2	Holywell	
Carnarvon Athletic	3–4	Rhyl	
Bangor	7–4	Colwyn Bay	
Colwyn Bay	1–3	Bangor	Replay
St Asaph	3–2	Bangor Athletic	
Buckley	w/o	Northwich Victoria	Buckley withdrew
Brymbo Institute	2–2	Gresford	
Gresford	2–1	Brymbo Institute	Replay
Westminster Rovers	w/o	Nantwich	Nantwich withdrew
Crewe Alexandra	w/o	Wrexham	Crewe Alexandra withdrew
Chirk	2–1	Ruabon Druids	
Wrexham Hibernians	2–2	Overton	
Overton	2–3	Wrexham Hibernians	Replay
Corwen	0–2	Rhosllanerchrugog	
Oswestry	4–3	Rhayader	
Shrewsbury Town	Bye		
Wellington St George	Bye		
Builth	Bye		

== Second round ==
Home team	Result	Away team	Remarks
St Asaph	w/o	Rhyl	St Asaph withdrew
Bangor	4–1	Mold	Bangor disqualified
Northwich Victoria	w/o	Wrexham	Northwich Victoria withdrew
Gresford	3–4	Westminster Rovers	
Rhosllanerchrugog	2–1	Chirk	
Wrexham Hibernians	3–5	Rhostyllen Victoria	
Oswestry	1–0	Wellington St George	
Shrewsbury Town	4–1	Builth	

== Third round ==
Home team	Result	Away team	Remarks
Rhyl	2–2	Mold	Mold won 3–2 after extra time
Westminster Rovers	0–1	Wrexham	
Rhostyllen Victoria	1–2	Chirk	
Shrewsbury Town	6–0	Oswestry	

== Semi-final ==
	Result		Venue	Crowd
Wrexham	4–3	Chirk	Shrewsbury	
Shrewsbury Town	5–0	Mold	The Racecourse Ground, Wrexham	

== Final ==
Winner	Result	Runner-up	Venue	Crowd
Shrewsbury Town	5–2	Wrexham	Cricket Field, Oswestry	3,000
