= 1888–89 Welsh Cup =

1888–89 Football Association of Wales Challenge Cup
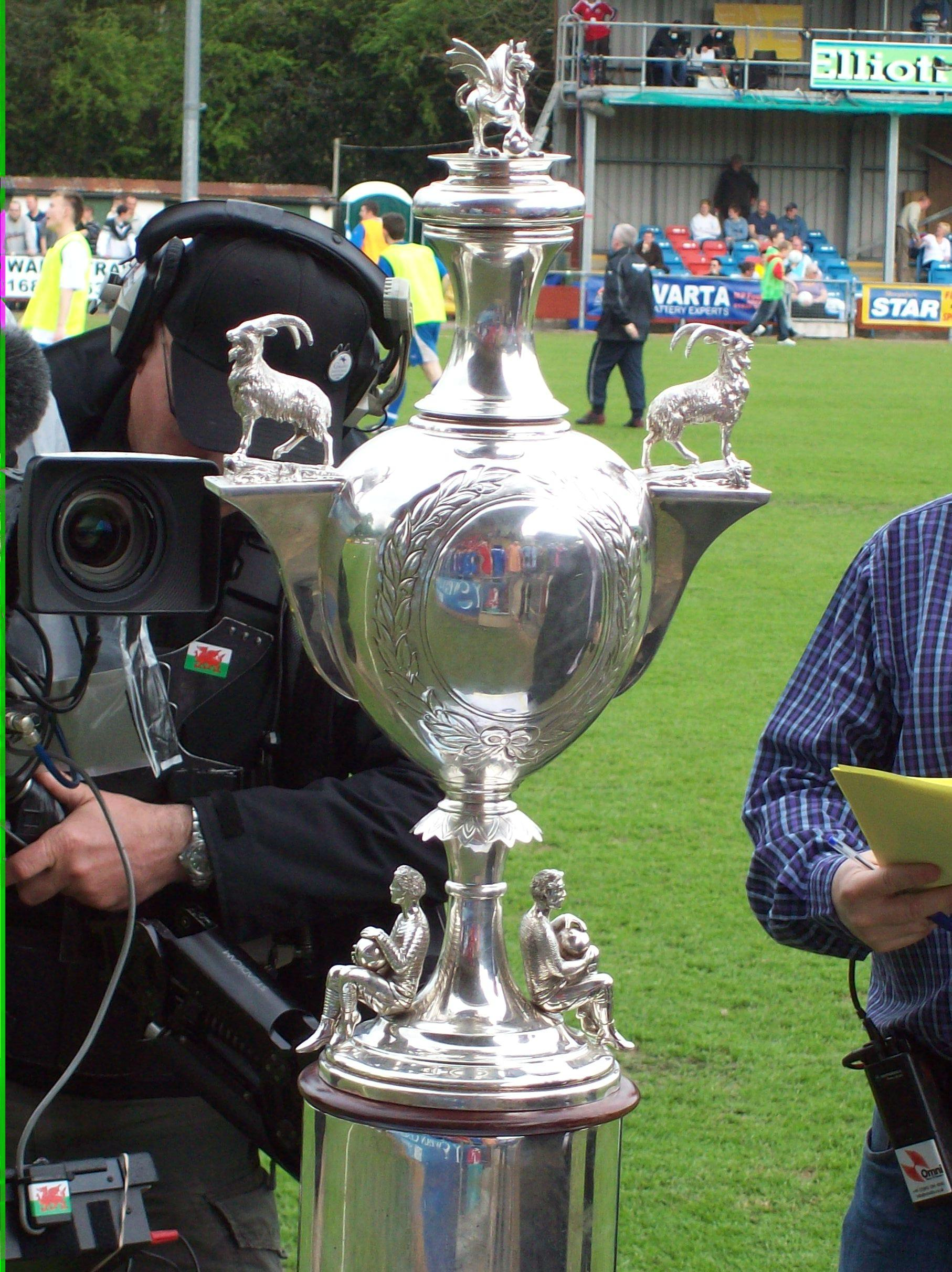
- The Welsh Cup

Tournament details
- Country: Wales

Final positions
- Champions: Bangor
- Runners-up: Northwich Victoria

The 1888–89 FAW Welsh Cup was the 12th edition of the annual knockout tournament for competitive football teams in Wales. The competition was won by Bangor.

== First round ==
=== Group one ===
Holywell	2 – 4	Ruthin

St Asaph	0 – 7	Bangor City

Mold	3 – 0	Porthmadoc	Corwen

Source: Welsh Football Data Archive

=== Group two ===
Builth	0 – 8	Chirk AAA	Knighton

Oswestry	1 – 0	Newtown RWW

Source: Welsh Football Data Archive

=== Group three ===
Llangollen Rovers	2 – 7	Alyn White Star

Druids	2 – 2	Wrexham

Rhostyllen Victoria	8 – 1	Corwen

Source: Welsh Football Data Archive

=== Replay ===
Wrexham	2 – 1	Druids	Racecourse Ground; Wrexham

Source: Welsh Football Data Archive

=== Group four ===
Nantwich	w/o	Crewe Alexandra

Over Wanderers	1 – 2	Northwich Victoria

Chester St Oswalds	5 – 1	Crewe Athletic

Source: Welsh Football Data Archive

Davenham receive a bye to the next round

== Second round ==
Ruthin	9 – 0^{1}	Mold

Chirk AAA	w/o	Oswestry

Wrexham	4 – 1^{2}	Alyn White Star

Rhostyllen Victoria	3 – 3	Vale of Llangollen

Davenham	2 – 2	Nantwich

Northwich Victoria	2 – 1	Chester St Oswalds

Source: Welsh Football Data Archive

Bangor receive a bye to the next round ^{1} Match protested regarding poor light, re-play was organised
^{2} Match protested regarding ineligible man, re-play was organised

=== Replay ===
Ruthin	3 – 0	Mold	St Asaph

Wrexham	3 – 0	Alyn White Star	Racecourse Ground; Wrexham

Rhostyllen Victoria	2 – 1	Vale of Llangollen

Davenham	2 – 3^{1}	Nantwich

Source: Welsh Football Data Archive

^{1} match abandoned after poor light

=== Second replay ===
Davenham	5 – 1	Nantwich

Source: Welsh Football Data Archive

== Third round ==
Ruthin	1 – 4	Bangor City

Wrexham	1 – 0^{1}	Rhostyllen Victoria

Davenham	0 – 0	Northwich Victoria

Source: Welsh Football Data Archive

Chirk AAA receive bye to next round
^{1} match protested, re-play was organised

=== Replay ===
Wrexham	4 – 0	Rhostyllen Victoria

Northwich Victoria	4 – 3	Davenham

Source: Welsh Football Data Archive

== Semi-final ==
Wrexham	2 – 3	Bangor City	Faulkner Street; Chester
Hewitt; P leary^{(o.g)}		D Lewis; P Leary 40'; W Lewis	Attendance: 2,000

Chirk AAA	1 – 1	Northwich Victoria	Chester
			Attendance: 3,000

Source: Welsh Football Data Archive

=== Replay ===
Northwich Victoria	3 – 2	Chirk AAA	Chester; Wrexham

Source: Welsh Football Data Archive

.

== Final ==
22 April 1889
15:30

Bangor	2 – 1	Northwich Victoria
E P Whitley-Hughes 75'; R O Roberts		R Leather 76'

Racecourse Ground, Wrexham
Attendance: 4,000
Referee: Mr Mitchell (Blackburn)

Bangor.	Northwich Victoria
