= 1887–88 Welsh Cup =

1887–88 Football Association of Wales Challenge Cup
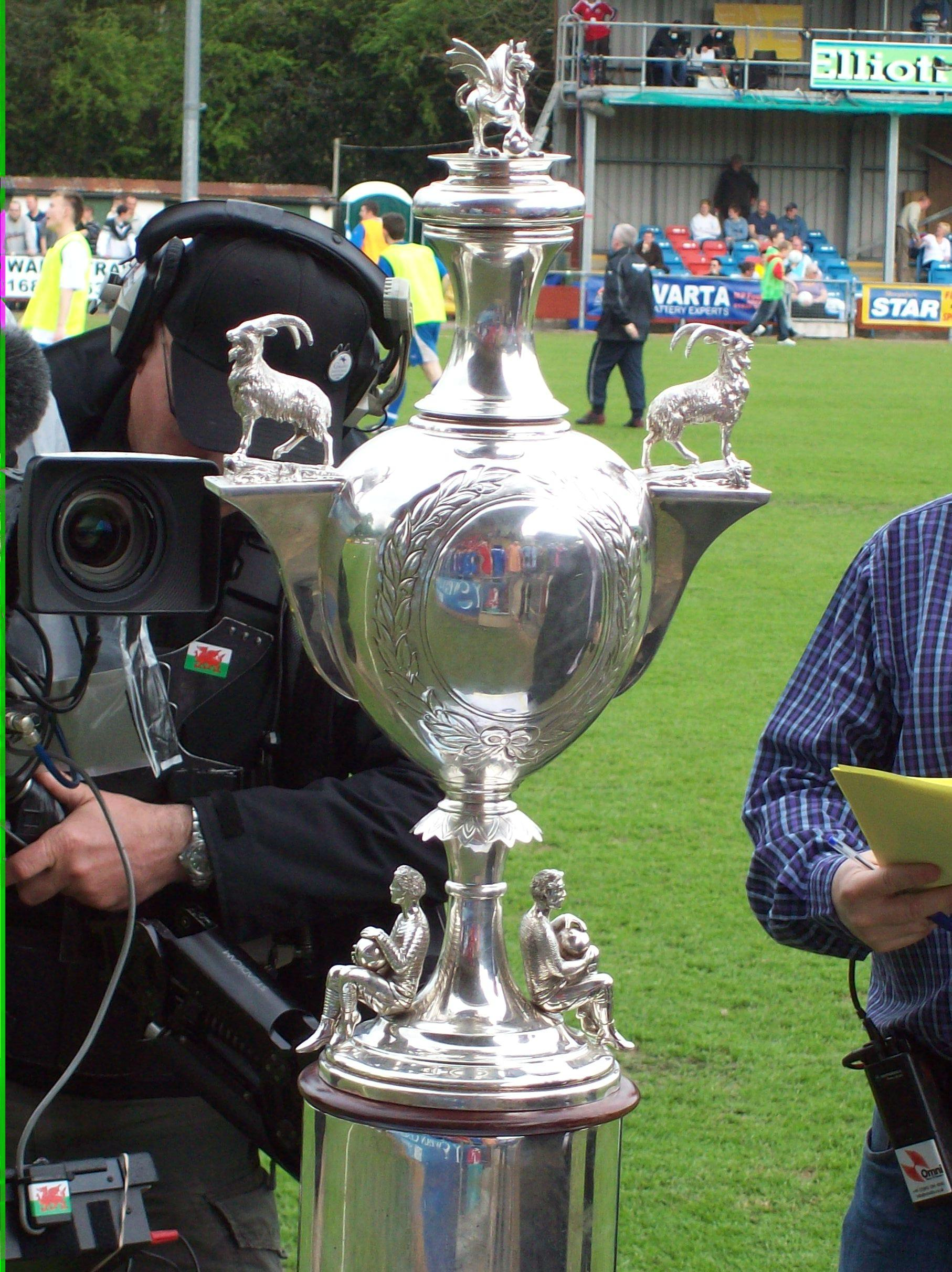
- The Welsh Cup

Tournament details
- Country: Wales

Final positions
- Champions: Chirk AAA
- Runners-up: Newtown

The 1887–88 Welsh Cup was the 11th season of the Welsh Cup. The cup was won by Chirk AAA who defeated Newtown 5–0 in the final, at Owens Field, Chester Road, Wrexham.

== First round ==
Home	Result	Away	Remarks
Vale of Llangollen	5–0	Wrexham Excelsior	
Wrexham Olympic	4–0	Alyn White Stars	
Druids	3–0	Rhostyllen Victoria	
Chirk	Bye		
Shrewsbury Town	0–2	Oswestry	
Newtown	9–0	Wem White Stars	
Ellesmere	0–8	Welshpool	Protest: Welshpool dismissed
Llanfyllin	Bye		
Davenham	2–0	Chester St Oswalds	
Crewe Alexandra	2–3	Northwich Victoria	
Over Wanderers	Bye		
Bangor	3–1	Llandudno	
Porthmadog	3-1	Corwen	
Mold	0–1	Ruthin	Mold found in next round.

== Second round ==
Home	Result	Away	Remarks
Wrexham Olympic	1–2	Vale of Llangollen	Vale protested after losing 4–1 on the basis that there was a late start and the ground was not enclosed, and a replay was ordered
Druids	1–2	Chirk	
Oswestry	6–0	Ellesmere	
Newtown		Llanfyllin	Result not found, Newtown progressed.
Northwich Victoria	3–0	Over Wanderers	
Bangor	1–2	Mold	
Davenham	Bye		
Porthmadog	Bye		

== Third round ==
Home	Result	Away	Remarks
Chirk	3-1	Vale of Llangollen	
Newtown	3-1	Oswestry	
Northwich Victoria	2-0	Davenham	
Mold	w/o	Porthmadog	Porthmadog withdrew

== Semi-final ==
Winner	Result	Runner-up	Venue	Remarks
Chirk	5-0	Northwich Victoria	Chester	17 March 1888.
Newtown	2-0	Mold	Oswestry	24 February 1888, crowd 1,000

== Final ==
Winner	Result	Runner-up	Venue	Crowd
Chirk	5-0	Newtown	Owens Field, Chester Road, Wrexham	3,000

5 May 1888
15:30

Chirk	5 – 0	Newtown
W Owen x2 G Owen; Davies; G Griffiths

Owens Field, Chester Road, Wrexham
Attendance: 3,000
Referee: Mr Darley (Blackburn)

Chirk	Newtown
