= Harry Adams (footballer) =

Welsh footballer

Personal information
- Date of birth: 1855
- Place of birth: Crick, England
- Date of death: 13 July 1910 (aged 54)
- Place of death: Ellesmere, England
- Position: Goalkeeper

Senior career*
Years	Team	Apps	(Gls)
1879–1882	Berwyn Rangers		
1882–1883	Druids		
1883–1895	Ellesmere		

International career
1882–1883	Wales	4	(0)
- * Club domestic league appearances and goals

Harry Adams (1855 – 13 July 1910) was an English-born Welsh footballer who played as a goalkeeper for Druids during their FA Cup run in 1882–83 and made four international appearances for Wales.

== Football career ==
Adams was born in Crick, Northamptonshire in England of Welsh parents, but returned to Llangollen in Wales where he worked as a plumber.

He started his football career with local side, Berwyn Rangers, in 1879 and was first selected to represent Wales in a friendly match against Ireland at the Racecourse Ground, Wrexham on 25 February 1882. The Welsh won the match 7–1, with John Price scoring four goals. Adams retained his place for the next match, against England, when the Welsh were again victorious by a margin of five goals to three.

His success with the Welsh team drew him to the attention of Druids (based in Ruabon), then one of the top teams in Wales, whom he joined in 1882. Druids entered the English FA Cup for the third time defeating local rivals, Oswestry Town and Northwich Victoria in the first two rounds, before meeting Bolton Wanderers in the Third Round. After two drawn matches, Druids won the second replay 1–0 and, after defeating Eagley in the next round, met Blackburn Olympic in the quarter-finals. Olympic won the match 4–1 and went on to win the cup in the Final a month later.

Druids were also dominating the Welsh Cup and, after victories over Chirk (3–2), Dolgellau Mountaineers (12–1), Aberystwyth Town (4–1), they met Adams' former club, Berwyn Rangers, in the Fourth Round, winning 5–2. After a semi-final victory over Northwich Victoria (3–0), Druids met Wrexham in the final. In the final itself, played at Wrexham's Racecourse Ground on 21 April 1883, the home side won 1–0, with the goal coming from Bill Roberts.

During his one season with Druids, Adams made two further international appearances, against England on 3 February 1883 (lost 5–0) and Ireland on 17 March (drawn 1–1).

In the summer of 1883, he moved to Ellesmere across the border in Shropshire where his parents were now living. Playing for the local town side, he dropped out of favour and was never selected for Wales again. He continued to play for Ellesmere until his early 40s.

== Life outside football ==
Adams remained in Ellesmere for the rest of his life and established his own plumbing business, which at one point also embraced painting, glazing, signwriting and embossing and gilding on glass; he was also a keen bandsman and rifleman, serving in the local (H) company of the King's Shropshire Light Infantry's 2nd Volunteer Battalion, in which he was bandmaster. He was also a member of the National Conservative League's Cyclist Corps, which assisted at elections as late as the 1906 General Election in his area. He died at Watergate Street, Ellesmere, aged 54, months after a serious operation, and was buried in Ellesmere Cemetery.

== International appearances ==
Adams made four appearances for Wales as follows:

Date	Venue	Opponent	Result	Goals	Competition
25 February 1882	Racecourse Ground, Wrexham	Ireland	7–1	0	Friendly
13 March 1882	Racecourse Ground, Wrexham	England	5–3	0	Friendly
3 February 1883	Kennington Oval, London	England	0–5	0	Friendly
17 March 1883	Ulster Ground, Belfast	Ireland	1–1	0	Friendly

Win	Draw	Loss

== Honours ==
Druids

- Welsh Cup finalist: 1883
