= 1884–85 Welsh Cup =

1884–85 Football Association of Wales Challenge Cup
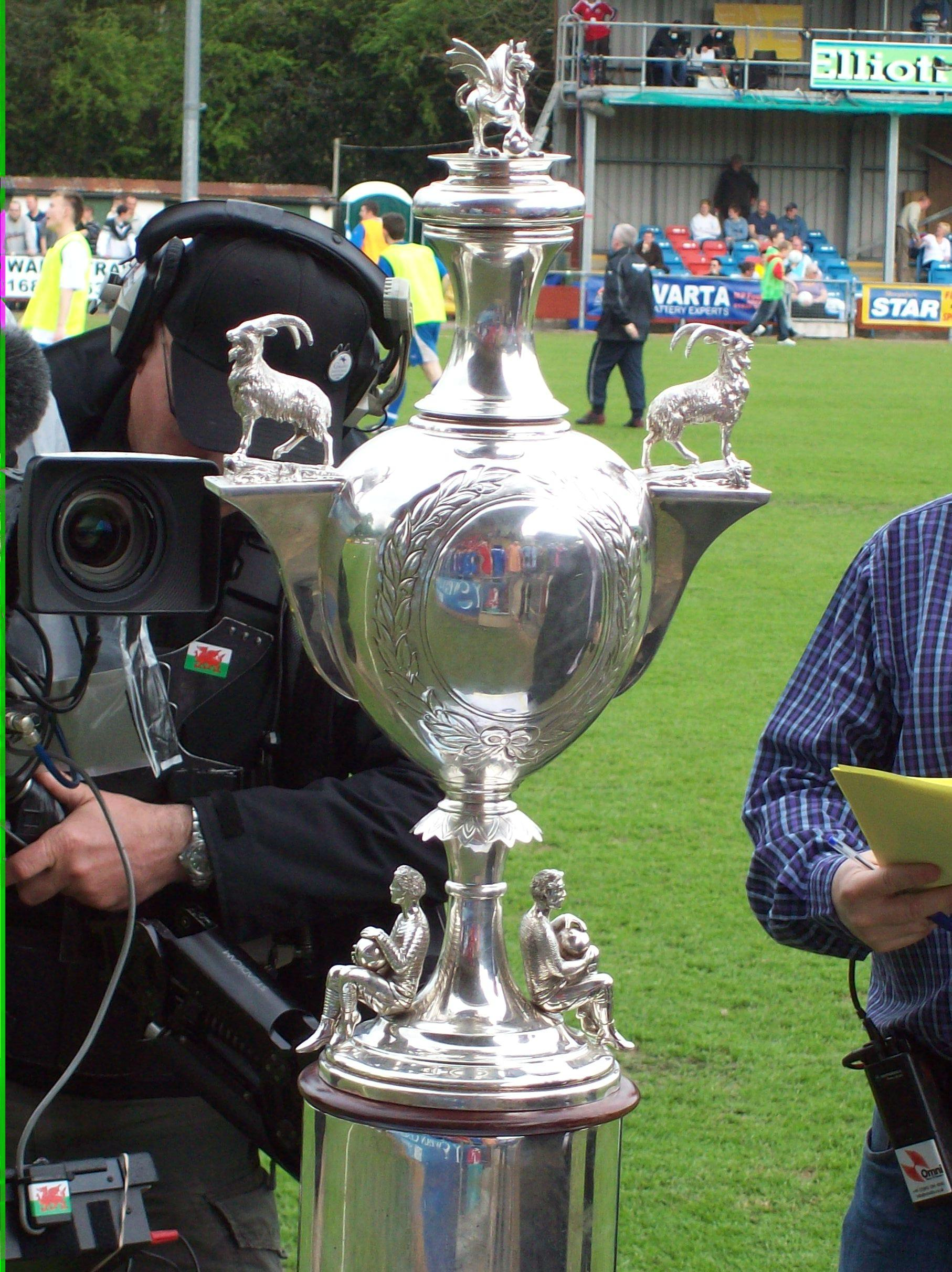
- The Welsh Cup

Tournament details
- Country: Wales

Final positions
- Champions: Druids
- Runners-up: Oswestry

The 1884–85 FAW Welsh Cup was the eighth edition of the annual knockout tournament for competitive football teams in Wales.

== First round ==
Northwich Victoria	3 – 0	Crewe Alexandra

Davenham	bye

Rhyl	1 – 1	Bangor City

Carnarvon Athletic	bye

Trefonen	1 – 2	Newtown

Shrewsbury Castle Blues	8 – 1	Ellesmere

Welshpool Town	0 – 8	Oswestry

Wrexham Olympic	1 – 1	Druids

Rhostyllen Victoria	0 – 5	Crown F.C.

Chirk	11 – 0	Gwersyllt Foresters

=== Replay ===
Rhyl	1 – 2	Bangor City

- Rhyl protest.

Rhyl	1 – 0	Bangor City

Wrexham Olympic	2 – 1	Druids	Oswestry

== Second round ==
Northwich Victoria	4 – 1	Davenham

Carnarvon Athletic	5 – 2	Bangor City

Shrewsbury Castle Blues	1 – 2	Newtown

Oswestry	bye

Rhostyllen Victoria	0 – 4	Chirk

Druids	bye

=== Replay ===
Rhostyllen Victoria	0 – 4	Chirk

== Third round ==
Northwich Victoria	bye

Carnarvon Athletic	bye

Newtown	1 – 1	Oswestry

Druids	2 – 0	Chirk

=== Replay ===
Newtown	0 – 1	Oswestry

- Disputed goal, Newtown walked off.

== Semifinals ==
Druids	3 – 1	Carnarvon Athletic	Racecourse Ground

Oswestry	2 – 1	Northwich Victoria	Crewe

== Final ==
7 March 1885	Druids	1 – 1	Oswestry	Racecourse Ground
	A Powell'		R Topham'	Attendance: 2,000; Referee: T Sloan (Liverpool)

=== Replay ===
14 April 1885	Druids	3 – 1	Oswestry	Racecourse Ground
	E Bowen'; A Powell' unknown'		J Evans'	Attendance: 2,000; Referee: T Sloan (Liverpool)
