= John Mathias =

John Mathias may refer to:

- John P. T. Mathias (1848–1927), American politician from Maryland
- John Mathias (rugby union) (1878–1940), English rugby player
- John Mathias (sailor) (born 1949), American sailor

== See also ==
- John Mathias House, Mathias, Hardy County, West Virginia
- John Matthias (disambiguation)
