= John Matthias =

John Matthias may refer to:

- John Matthias (poet), American poet
- John Matthias (footballer) (1878–?), Welsh international footballer.
- John M. Matthias, politician in the Ohio House of Representatives
- John B. Matthias (1767–1848), writer of the words and music for the gospel song "Palms of Victory"

== See also ==
- John Mathias (disambiguation)
