= Alyn Stars F.C. =

Football club based in Wrexham

Alyn Stars F.C. was a football club from Gwersyllt, Wrexham. The club was also known as Alyn White Stars or Gwersyllt Alyn Stars.

They entered the Welsh Cup twice, in 1887–88 and 1888–89.

The earliest mention of the football club is from 1883, though they appear in cricket fixtures as early as 1880. The last mention of the club is from 1889.
