= 1925–26 FA Cup =

Tournament details
- Country: England; Wales

Final positions
- Champions: Bolton Wanderers (2nd title)
- Runners-up: Manchester City

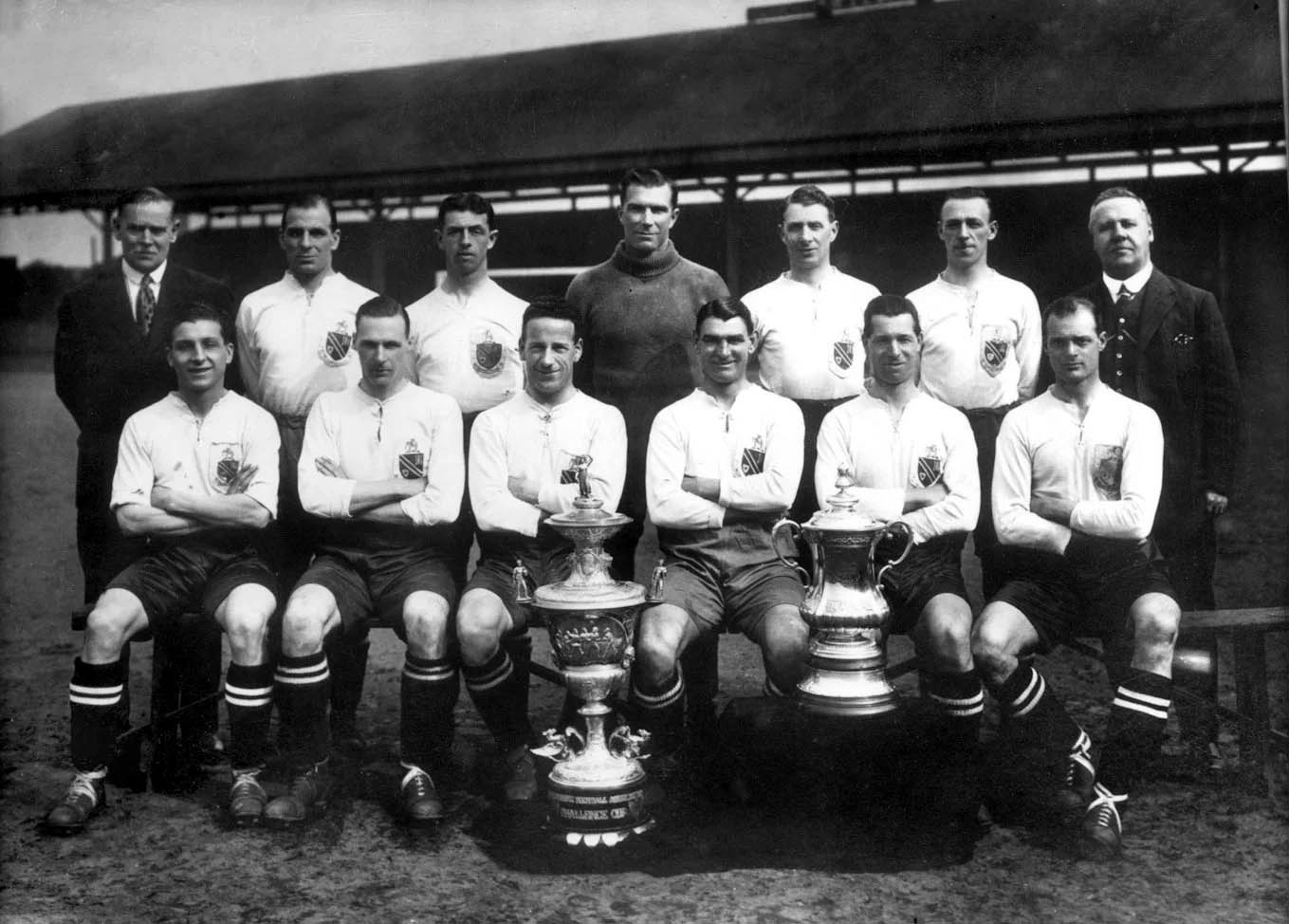
Wanderers posing with the trophies won in 1926

The 1925–26 FA Cup was the 51st staging of the world's oldest football cup competition, the Football Association Challenge Cup, commonly known as the FA Cup. Bolton Wanderers won the competition for the second time, beating Manchester City 1–0 in the final at Wembley.

Matches were scheduled to be played at the stadium of the team named first on the date specified for each round, which was always a Saturday. Some matches, however, might be rescheduled for other days if there were clashes with games for other competitions or the weather was inclement. If scores were level after 90 minutes had been played, a replay would take place at the stadium of the second-named team later the same week. If the replayed match was drawn further replays would be held until a winner was determined. If scores were level after 90 minutes had been played in a replay, a 30-minute period of extra time would be played. This was the first edition of the tournament with the modern numbering conventions whereby the fifth and sixth qualifying rounds became the first and second rounds proper. What had previously been known as the first round proper became the third round proper.

== Calendar ==
Round	Date
Extra preliminary round	Saturday 5 September 1925
Preliminary round	Saturday 19 September 1925
First qualifying round	Saturday 3 October 1925
Second qualifying round	Saturday 17 October 1925
Third qualifying round	Saturday 31 October 1925
Fourth qualifying round	Saturday 14 November 1925
First round proper	Saturday 28 November 1925
Second round	Saturday 12 December 1925
Third round	Saturday 9 January 1926
Fourth round	Saturday 30 January 1926
Fifth round	Saturday 20 February 1926
Sixth round	Saturday 6 March 1926
Semifinals	Saturday 27 March 1926
Final	Saturday 24 April 1926

== Qualifying rounds ==
From this season on, Football League clubs were (with a few very occasional exceptions) exempted to the first or third rounds proper. Most teams entering the competition that were not members of the Football League had to compete in the qualifying rounds.

The upside for non-league football, however, was that 25 clubs per season would qualify for the competition's main draw. This season, the 25 winners from the fourth qualifying round were Stockton, Blyth Spartans, South Bank, Chilton Colliery Recreation, Horden Athletic, Carlisle United, Lytham, Mold Town, Wath Athletic, Mansfield Town, Worksop Town, Boston Town, Worcester City, Kettering Town, Wellington Town, Windsor & Eton, Barnet, Leyton, Ilford, Sittingbourne, Folkestone, Chatham, Farnham United Breweries, Torquay United and Weymouth.

Chilton Colliery Recreation, Horden Athletic, Lytham, Mold Town, Wath Athletic, Mansfield Town, Wellington Town, Windsor & Eton, Ilford, Sittingbourne, Folkestone, Farnham United Breweries, Torquay United and Weymouth were making the most of the new format by featuring in the competition proper for the first time. Additionally, Worcester was appearing at this stage for the first time since 1905-06, and Boston and South Bank for the first time since 1887-88.

Horden Athletic and Wath Athletic were also the first clubs to progress from the extra preliminary round to the main draw since Hednesford Town and Thornycrofts (Woolston) in 1919-20 (although, with the change in format, Horden and Wath played two fewer matches than the other clubs). Horden defeated Thornley Albion, Craghead United, White-le-Head Rangers, Wingate Albion Comrades, Shildon and Scarborough along the way, while Wath Athletic overcame Brodsworth Main Colliery, Cudworth Village, Denaby United, Mexborough Athletic, York City and Rushden Town. Neither club progressed past the first round proper.

== First round proper ==
At this stage 40 clubs from the Football League Third Division North and South joined the 25 non-league clubs who came through the qualifying rounds. Millwall, Bristol City, Crystal Palace and Plymouth Argyle were given byes to the third round, while four Second Division sides, Barnsley, Darlington, Oldham Athletic and Swansea Town were entered at this stage. To bring the number of teams up to 76, seven non-league sides were given byes to this round. These were:

- Clapton
- St Albans City
- London Caledonians
- West Stanley
- Northfleet United
- Dulwich Hamlet
- Southall

Clapton and Southall were the champion and finalist from the previous season's FA Amateur Cup competition. In receiving byes to the first round proper of this season's Cup tournament, the clubs were reviving a convention last implemented by the Football Association in 1905-06 with Oxford City.

38 matches were scheduled to be played on Saturday, 28 November 1925. Seven matches were drawn and went to replays in the following midweek fixture, of which four went to another replay, and one of these went to a third.

Tie no	Home team	Score	Away team	Date
1	Clapton	3–1	Norwich City	28 November 1925
2	Bournemouth & Boscombe Athletic	3–0	Merthyr Town	28 November 1925
3	Rochdale	4–0	West Stanley	1 December 1925
4	South Bank	1–4	Stockton	3 December 1925
5	Weymouth	0–1	Newport County	28 November 1925
6	Walsall	0–1	Grimsby Town	28 November 1925
7	Gillingham	6–0	Southall	28 November 1925
8	Leyton	1–0	St Albans City	28 November 1925
9	Chatham	0–3	Sittingbourne	28 November 1925
10	Luton Town	3–0	Folkestone	28 November 1925
11	London Caledonians	1–2	Ilford	28 November 1925
12	Boston Town	5–2	Mansfield Town	28 November 1925
13	Doncaster Rovers	2–0	Wellington Town	28 November 1925
14	Tranmere Rovers	0–0	Crewe Alexandra	28 November 1925
Replay	Crewe Alexandra	2–1	Tranmere Rovers	2 December 1925
15	Worksop Town	1–0	Coventry City	28 November 1925
16	Accrington Stanley	4–0	Wrexham	28 November 1925
17	Brentford	3–1	Barnet	28 November 1925
18	Northampton Town	3–1	Barnsley	28 November 1925
19	Wath Athletic	0–5	Chesterfield	28 November 1925
20	Brighton & Hove Albion	1–1	Watford	28 November 1925
Replay	Watford	2–0	Brighton & Hove Albion	2 December 1925
21	Northfleet United	2–2	Queens Park Rangers	28 November 1925
Replay	Queens Park Rangers	2–0	Northfleet United	2 December 1925
22	Carlisle United	0–2	Chilton Colliery Recreation	28 November 1925
23	Oldham Athletic	10–1	Lytham	28 November 1925
24	Worcester City	0–0	Kettering Town	28 November 1925
Replay	Kettering Town	0–0	Worcester City	3 December 1925
Replay	Kettering Town	2–0	Worcester City	7 December 1925
25	Southend United	5–1	Dulwich Hamlet	28 November 1925
26	Bradford Park Avenue	2–2	Lincoln City	28 November 1925
Replay	Lincoln City	1–1	Bradford Park Avenue	2 December 1925
Replay	Bradford Park Avenue	2–1	Lincoln City	7 December 1925
27	Exeter City	1–3	Swansea Town	28 November 1925
28	Horden Athletic	2–3	Darlington	28 November 1925
29	Blyth Spartans	2–2	Hartlepools United	28 November 1925
Replay	Hartlepools United	1–1	Blyth Spartans	2 December 1925
Replay	Hartlepools United	1–1	Blyth Spartans	7 December 1925
Replay	Hartlepools United	1–2	Blyth Spartans	9 December 1925
30	Halifax Town	0–3	Rotherham United	28 November 1925
31	Charlton Athletic	4–2	Windsor & Eton	28 November 1925
32	Durham City	4–1	Ashington	2 December 1925
33	Southport	1–0	Mold Town	28 November 1925
34	Aberdare Athletic	4–1	Bristol Rovers	28 November 1925
35	New Brighton	2–0	Barrow	28 November 1925
36	Torquay United	1–1	Reading	28 November 1925
Replay	Reading	1–1	Torquay United	2 December 1925
Replay	Reading	2–0	Torquay United	7 December 1925
37	Farnham United Breweries	1–10	Swindon Town	28 November 1925
38	Wigan Borough	3–0	Nelson	2 December 1925

== Second round proper ==
The matches were played on Saturday, 12 December 1925. Four matches were drawn, with replays taking place in the following midweek fixture.

Tie no	Home team	Score	Away team	Date
1	Clapton	1–0	Ilford	12 December 1925
2	Reading	6–0	Leyton	12 December 1925
3	Crewe Alexandra	2–2	Wigan Borough	12 December 1925
Replay	Wigan Borough	2–1	Crewe Alexandra	16 December 1925
4	Swindon Town	7–0	Sittingbourne	12 December 1925
5	Boston Town	1–0	Bradford Park Avenue	12 December 1925
6	Stockton	4–6	Oldham Athletic	12 December 1925
7	Doncaster Rovers	0–2	Rotherham United	12 December 1925
8	Worksop Town	1–2	Chesterfield	12 December 1925
9	Queens Park Rangers	1–1	Charlton Athletic	12 December 1925
Replay	Charlton Athletic	1–0	Queens Park Rangers	17 December 1925
10	Accrington Stanley	5–0	Blyth Spartans	12 December 1925
11	Brentford	1–2	Bournemouth & Boscombe Athletic	12 December 1925
12	Northampton Town	3–1	Newport County	12 December 1925
13	Southend United	1–0	Gillingham	12 December 1925
14	Swansea Town	3–2	Watford	12 December 1925
15	Durham City	0–3	Southport	12 December 1925
16	Aberdare Athletic	1–0	Luton Town	12 December 1925
17	New Brighton	2–0	Darlington	12 December 1925
18	Chilton Colliery Recreation	1–1	Rochdale	12 December 1925
Replay	Rochdale	1–2	Chilton Colliery Recreation	17 December 1925
19	Kettering Town	1–1	Grimsby Town	12 December 1925
Replay	Grimsby Town	3–1	Kettering Town	15 December 1925

== Third round proper ==
40 of the 44 First and Second Division clubs entered the competition at this stage, along with Third Division South teams Millwall, Bristol City, Crystal Palace and Plymouth Argyle. Also given a bye to this round was amateur side Corinthian. Chilton Colliery Recreation and Boston Town were the last clubs from the qualifying rounds to feature in the competition.

The matches were scheduled for Saturday, 9 January 1926. Nine matches were drawn and went to replays in the following midweek fixture, of which one went to a second replay.

Tie no	Home team	Score	Away team	Date
1	Birmingham	2–0	Grimsby Town	9 January 1926
2	Blackpool	0–2	Swansea Town	9 January 1926
3	Chesterfield	0–1	Clapton Orient	9 January 1926
4	Clapton	2–3	Swindon Town	9 January 1926
5	Bournemouth & Boscombe Athletic	2–0	Reading	9 January 1926
6	South Shields	3–0	Chilton Colliery Recreation	9 January 1926
7	Southampton	0–0	Liverpool	9 January 1926
Replay	Liverpool	1–0	Southampton	13 January 1926
8	Notts County	2–0	Leicester City	9 January 1926
9	Nottingham Forest	1–0	Bradford City	9 January 1926
10	Blackburn Rovers	1–1	Preston North End	9 January 1926
Replay	Preston North End	1–4	Blackburn Rovers	14 January 1926
11	Bolton Wanderers	1–0	Accrington Stanley	9 January 1926
12	Wolverhampton Wanderers	1–1	Arsenal	9 January 1926
Replay	Arsenal	1–0	Wolverhampton Wanderers	13 January 1926
13	Middlesbrough	5–1	Leeds United	9 January 1926
14	West Bromwich Albion	4–1	Bristol City	9 January 1926
15	Sunderland	8–1	Boston Town	9 January 1926
16	Derby County	0–0	Portsmouth	9 January 1926
Replay	Portsmouth	1–1	Derby County	13 January 1926
Replay	Derby County	2–0	Portsmouth	18 January 1926
17	Everton	1–1	Fulham	9 January 1926
Replay	Fulham	1–0	Everton	14 January 1926
18	Sheffield United	2–0	Stockport County	9 January 1926
19	Newcastle United	4–1	Aberdare Athletic	9 January 1926
20	Tottenham Hotspur	5–0	West Ham United	9 January 1926
21	Northampton Town	3–3	Crystal Palace	9 January 1926
Replay	Crystal Palace	2–1	Northampton Town	13 January 1926
22	Plymouth Argyle	1–2	Chelsea	9 January 1926
23	Millwall	1–1	Oldham Athletic	9 January 1926
Replay	Oldham Athletic	0–1	Millwall	12 January 1926
24	Hull City	0–3	Aston Villa	9 January 1926
25	Southend United	5–2	Southport	9 January 1926
26	Cardiff City	2–2	Burnley	9 January 1926
Replay	Burnley	0–2	Cardiff City	13 January 1926
27	Port Vale	2–3	Manchester United	9 January 1926
28	Charlton Athletic	0–1	Huddersfield Town	9 January 1926
29	New Brighton	2–1	The Wednesday	9 January 1926
30	Wigan Borough	2–5	Stoke City	9 January 1926
31	Corinthian	3–3	Manchester City	9 January 1926
Replay	Manchester City	4–0	Corinthian	13 January 1926
32	Rotherham United	2–3	Bury	9 January 1926

== Fourth round proper ==
The matches were scheduled for Saturday, 30 January 1926. Three games were drawn and went to replays in the following midweek fixture.

Tie no	Home team	Score	Away team	Date
1	Bournemouth & Boscombe Athletic	2–2	Bolton Wanderers	30 January 1926
Replay	Bolton Wanderers	6–2	Bournemouth & Boscombe Athletic	3 February 1926
2	Bury	3–3	Millwall	30 January 1926
Replay	Millwall	2–0	Bury	3 February 1926
3	South Shields	2–1	Birmingham	30 January 1926
4	Notts County	2–0	New Brighton	30 January 1926
5	Nottingham Forest	2–0	Swindon Town	30 January 1926
6	West Bromwich Albion	1–2	Aston Villa	30 January 1926
7	Sheffield United	1–2	Sunderland	30 January 1926
8	Tottenham Hotspur	2–2	Manchester United	30 January 1926
Replay	Manchester United	2–0	Tottenham Hotspur	3 February 1926
9	Manchester City	4–0	Huddersfield Town	30 January 1926
10	Fulham	3–1	Liverpool	30 January 1926
11	Clapton Orient	4–2	Middlesbrough	30 January 1926
12	Crystal Palace	2–1	Chelsea	30 January 1926
13	Southend United	4–1	Derby County	30 January 1926
14	Cardiff City	0–2	Newcastle United	30 January 1926
15	Swansea Town	6–3	Stoke City	30 January 1926
16	Arsenal	3–1	Blackburn Rovers	30 January 1926

== Fifth round proper ==
The matches were scheduled for Saturday, 20 February 1926. There were two replays, played in the next midweek fixture.

Tie no	Home team	Score	Away team	Date
1	Notts County	0–1	Fulham	20 February 1926
2	Aston Villa	1–1	Arsenal	20 February 1926
Replay	Arsenal	2–0	Aston Villa	24 February 1926
3	Bolton Wanderers	3–0	South Shields	20 February 1926
4	Sunderland	3–3	Manchester United	20 February 1926
Replay	Manchester United	2–1	Sunderland	24 February 1926
5	Manchester City	11–4	Crystal Palace	20 February 1926
6	Millwall	0–1	Swansea Town	20 February 1926
7	Clapton Orient	2–0	Newcastle United	20 February 1926
8	Southend United	0–1	Nottingham Forest	20 February 1926

== Sixth round proper ==
The four quarter-final ties were scheduled to be played on Saturday, 6 March 1926. There was one replay, between Nottingham Forest and Bolton Wanderers, played in the following midweek fixture. This then went to a second replay the week after.

Tie no	Home team	Score	Away team	Date
1	Nottingham Forest	2–2	Bolton Wanderers	6 March 1926
Replay	Bolton Wanderers	0–0	Nottingham Forest	10 March 1926
Replay	Bolton Wanderers	1–0	Nottingham Forest	15 March 1926
2	Fulham	1–2	Manchester United	6 March 1926
3	Clapton Orient	1–6	Manchester City	6 March 1926
4	Swansea Town	2–1	Arsenal	6 March 1926

== Semifinals ==
The semi-final matches were played on Saturday, 27 March 1926. Both matches ended in 3–0 victories for Manchester City and Bolton Wanderers, who went on to meet in the final at Wembley.

27 March 1926
15:00

Manchester City	3–0	Manchester United

Bramall Lane, Sheffield

27 March 1926
15:00

Bolton Wanderers	3–0	Swansea Town

White Hart Lane, London

== Final ==
The 1926 FA Cup final was contested by Bolton Wanderers and Manchester City at Wembley. Bolton won by a single goal, scored by David Jack.

=== Match details ===
24 April 1926
15:00 BST

Bolton Wanderers	1–0	Manchester City
Jack 76'	(Report)

Wembley, London
Attendance: 91,447
Referee: I. Baker

Bolton Wanderers	Manchester City

== See also ==
- FA Cup final results 1872-
