= Bollington F.C. =

English football club based in Bollington, Cheshire

Bollington
- Full name: Bollington Football Club
- Nickname: The Saints
- Founded: 1875
- Dissolved: 1927; 99 years ago
- Ground: Recreation Ground
Home colours

Bollington F.C. was an English association football club, from Bollington, near Macclesfield, Cheshire.

== History ==
Although claiming a foundation date of 1875, the club does not appear to have been particularly active, until entering the Cheshire Senior Cup in 1883, losing in the first round to Macclesfield St John's.

=== FA Cup entries ===
Despite being a minor team even within Cheshire, in 1885, Bollington entered the FA Cup and was drawn to play Oswestry at home. The club was let down by its finishing; Bollington "had the best of the play, but weak shooting rendered every run useless, showing the great contrast to Oswestry, who seldom missed a good chance". The final score was 5–0, four coming in the first half. The club lost in the second round of the Cheshire Cup to Davenham.

Undaunted, the club entered again the 1886–87, receiving the same draw; this time Bollington moved the tie to Macclesfield, being rewarded with a crowd of 700, but Oswestry won 8–2, scoring in the second minute and, like the previous year, being 4–0 up at the break. Bollington also exited the Cheshire Cup at the second round for the second consecutive year, although the club played for 80 minutes with ten men after outside-left winger Arden had his eye infected by lime from the boundary lines when the ball was kicked in his face.

=== Local years ===
The club did not enter the FA Cup again and concentrated on the local scene. Although the club again lost in the second round in the Cheshire Cup in 1887–88, it was only by 3–2 to Chester. However the gap between Bollington and the top clubs in the county was shown by their first round exit in the Cheshire Cup in 1888–89 to Crewe Alexandra by nine goals to two.

Nevertheless, the club was still good enough to beat Manchester Association 8–0 at the start of the 1889–90 season. It was however a false dawn; the club lost in the first round of the Cheshire Cup to Over Wanderers 6–1, and reverted to local football, joining the North Cheshire League in 1894. In 1901 the club won both the Stockport League and Stockport League Cup, and in 1902–03 gained its only competitive win over local rivals Macclesfield, in the Cheshire Senior Cup, Stanley Turner netting a hat-trick in a 4–3 win.

The club continued in various local leagues, but, after finishing 4th in the North Cheshire League in 1926–27, the club did not continue into the new season, leaving behind unpaid rent for use of the Bollington Recreation Ground.

== Colours ==
The club gave its colours as maroon, the same as neighbours Davenham.

== Ground ==
The club's original ground was on Garden Street, and it used the Royal Oak for facilities. In 1894 it moved to a field next to the cricket club. By 1901 it was at the Cheshire Hunt ground and after the First World War played on the Recreation Ground.
