= Alf Pugh =

Welsh footballer

Personal information
- Full name: Allen Pugh
- Date of birth: 27 October 1869
- Place of birth: Esclusham, Wales
- Date of death: 7 February 1942 (aged 72)
- Place of death: Wrexham, Wales
- Position: Goalkeeper

Senior career*
Years	Team	Apps	(Gls)
1884–1885	Rhostyllen Victoria		
1885–1886	Wrexham Olympic		
1886–1896	Rhostyllen Victoria		

International career
1889	Wales	1	(0)
- * Club domestic league appearances and goals

Allen "Alf" Pugh (27 October 1869 – 7 February 1942) was a Welsh amateur football goalkeeper who made one appearance for Wales in 1889. He was the first player to be replaced by a substitute in international football.

== Football career ==
Pugh was born in the Esclusham district, a few miles west of Wrexham. His early football was played at the nearby village of Rhostyllen before joining Wrexham Olympic for a year in 1885. Described as a "competent goalkeeper," he represented Denbighshire twice: in January 1885, against Shropshire and in November, against Lancashire. After losing his place at Wrexham to Sam Gillam, he returned to Rhostyllen, where he continued to play for a further ten years.

On 15 April 1889, Wales were playing their British Home Championship match against Scotland at the Racecourse Ground. Wrexham; the regular goalkeeper, Jim Trainer, failed to turn up for the match, as Preston North End refused to release him. The kick-off was delayed while a replacement was sought; eventually, the match got underway with Pugh in goal, before Gillam arrived some twenty minutes into the match. Neither 'keeper conceded a goal, and the match ended 0–0; this was the first time in 14 matches between the countries that the Scots had failed to defeat the Welsh, and only the second international match in which neither team had managed to score, the first being the very first officially recognized international match, between Scotland and England on 30 November 1872. This was also the first use of a substitute in international football.

== Later life ==
Pugh later kept the Union Vaults public house in Yorke Street, Wrexham.
