= Farnham United Breweries F.C. =

Farnham United Breweries
- Full name: Farnham United Breweries F.C.
- Nicknames: The Bungs, the Brewers
- Founded: 1910
- Dissolved: 1928
- Ground: Brewery Sports Ground (1910–1920); Memorial Ground (1920–1928)

Farnham United Breweries F.C. was an English association football club which participated in the FA Cup and the Surrey Senior League in the 1920s. The club originally played at the Brewery Sports Ground. It subsequently played at the Memorial Ground, which was named in memory of five Farnham United Breweries workers who were killed during World War I.

== History ==
The club was the works side of Farnham United Breweries, and the first reference to the football club is from the start of the 1910–11 season; the club finished its first season by winning two junior trophies (the Aldershot League and Surrey Cup).

In 1925–26, the club reached the first round proper of the FA Cup for the only time, helped by being drawn at home for five of the six ties it played. At the first round stage, the Bungs were drawn at home to Swindon Town, but the professionals were much too strong for the brewery workers, scoring 7 in the first half; at 9–0 down, Watson of the home side had a penalty saved by Nash, but Bicknell converted a cross soon afterwards to give the Brewers a consolation goal, before Denyer made it 10–1 by the end.

The final references to the club come from the 1927–28 season, its final recorded fixture being at Reigate Priory in the Surrey Senior League in March 1928.

== Colours ==
Although there is no available record of the club colours, they were likely to be red and white, as Woking had to wear white change shirts when playing at the Sports Ground.

== Ground ==
The club moved to a new ground, the Sports Ground, in November 1920, opened with a match between junior XIs representing the Berkshire & Buckinghamshire FA and the Surrey FA. The ground was subsequently renamed the Memorial Ground, in memory of five Farnham United Breweries workers who were killed during World War I. The ground is currently used by Farnham Town F.C.
