= 1884–85 Aston Villa F.C. season =

Aston Villa
1884–85 season
- FA Cup: 3rd round

The 1884–85 English football season was Aston Villa's 6th season in Football Association Cup, the top-level football competition at the time.

There were debut appearances for Dick Robertson and Albert A Brown.

== FA Cup details ==
3 November 1884 1st Round	Aston Villa	4–1	Wednesbury Town
		Report
Note:

6 December 1884 2nd Round	Walsall Town	0–2	Aston Villa
		Report
Note:

3 January 1885 3rd Round	Aston Villa	0–0	West Bromwich Albion
		Report
Note: On 3 January 1885 Villa & West Brom met for the first time in the third round of the FA Cup

10 January 1885 3rd Round Replay	West Bromwich Albion	3–0	Aston Villa
		Report
Note: The goalless draw was followed by a 3–0 victory for WBA in "drenching rain".

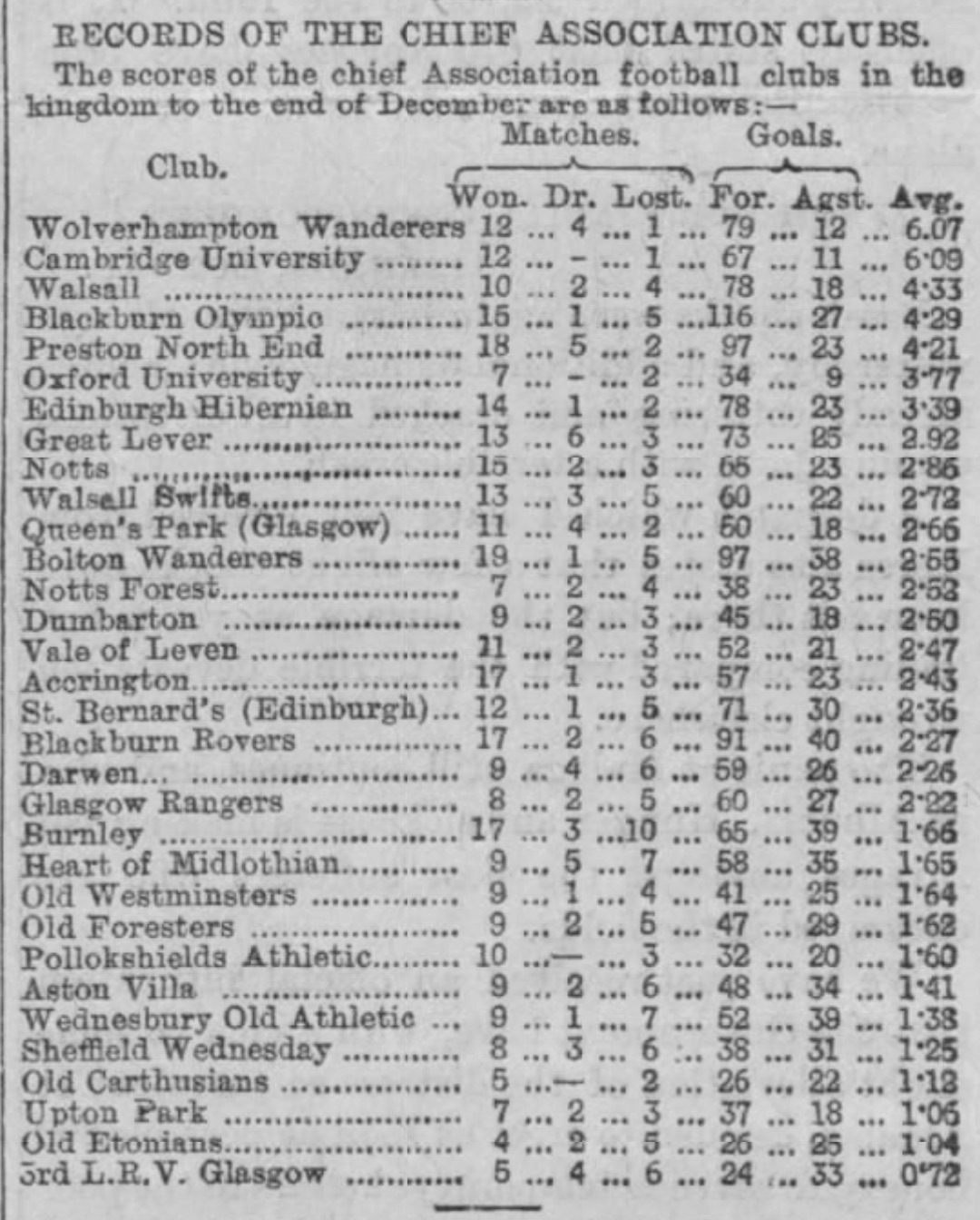
An early form of football league table, with clubs sorted by goal average. Manchester Courier, 5 January 1885

== Birmingham Senior Cup ==
Aston Villa won the Birmingham Senior Cup for the 5th time.

Staveley had the club's best run coming in 1884–85. The club reached the quarter-final, and almost pulled off an almighty shock, drawing 1–1 with holders and eventual winners Aston Villa at the Aston Lower Grounds, but, with the replay taking place at the same venue, and Staveley being forced to do without Wilshaw in the replay, it could not repeat the feat.

== Friendlies ==
In addition to the various cup competitions, the club's fixtures included testimonials and friendlies. On 13 August 1884 Villa played Blackburn Rovers "in beautiful red jerseys and white knickers As late as 1901, in the warm weather months, Villa would forgo their heavier woollen club colours in favour of thin cotton red shirts .

On 27 September, Aston Villa fielded two teams. The stronger team played Aston Unity at home while the weaker team travelled to Shrewsbury to play the infamous Castle Blues. The match was abandoned 1–1 after both match balls were burst possibly on purpose by the home team players and home supporters.
