= Shrewsbury Castle Blues F.C. =

Shrewsbury Castle Blues
- Full name: Shrewsbury Castle Blues Football Club
- Nickname: Castle Blues
- Founded: c. 1877
- Dissolved: April 1886
- Ground: Racecourse Ground, Monkmoor, Shrewsbury
Home colours

Shrewsbury Castle Blues F.C. was a football club based in Shrewbury, England. The club are recorded as playing their home games at the Racecourse at Monkmoor.

Castle Blues were formed around 1877 by grammar school old boys, and initially played at Sutton Lane. In 1881 the Shrewsbury Engineers were amalgamated into the club.

The club entered the Welsh Cup in 1881–82, and again in 1884–85, and 1885–86.

Castle Blues were infamous for being a very rough team with aggressive supporters. In one of their matches against Wellington Town, the opposition were left with just six outfield players as a result of "violent and unorthodox tackling" leading to the game being abandoned. On 27 September 1884, a match versus the Aston Villa 2nd team at Shrewsbury was abandoned 1–1 after both match balls were burst possibly on purpose by the home team players and home supporters. As a result of their reputation, Castle Blues were forced to disband by the Birmingham FA in April 1886. The club ceased to exist in that month and was absorbed into Shrewsbury Town when they were reformed in May 1886.

== Cup History ==
Season	Competition	Round	Opposition	Score
1881-82	Welsh Cup	First Round	Welshpool Warriors	1-0
1881-82	Welsh Cup	Second Round	Aberystwyth	1-3
1882-83	Shropshire Senior Cup	Final	Oswestry	1-2
1883-84	Shropshire Senior Cup	Final	Wellington Town	
1883-84	Shropshire Senior Cup	Final Replay	Wellington Town	0-1
1884-85	Welsh Cup	First Round	Ellesmere	8-1
1884-85	Welsh Cup	Second Round	Newtown	1-2
1884-85	Shropshire Senior Cup	Final	Wellington Town	
1884-85	Shropshire Senior Cup	Final Replay 1	Wellington Town	
1884-85	Shropshire Senior Cup	Final Replay 2	Wellington Town	2-1
1885-86	Welsh Cup	First Round	Trefonen	6-0
1885-86	Welsh Cup	Second Round	Llanfyllin	3-0
1885-86	Welsh Cup	Third Round	Newtown	1-1
1885-86	Welsh Cup	Third Round Replay	Newtown	0-2
1885-86	Shropshire Senior Cup	First Round	Wellington Town	1-1
1885-86	Shropshire Senior Cup	First Round Replay	Wellington Town	0-1

== Honours ==
=== Cups ===
- Shropshire Senior Cup

Winners (1): 1885
Runner Up (2): 1883, 1884

== Notable players ==
- (England) Clopton Lloyd-Jones - 1880 FA Cup winner with Clapham Rovers
