= Richard Parry Williams =

Welsh footballer

Richard Williams
Personal information
- Full name: Richard Parry Williams
- Date of birth: 1863
- Place of birth: Wales
- Date of death: July 27, 1934 (aged 70–71)
- Position: Forward

Senior career*
Years	Team	Apps	(Gls)
- Carnarvon Athletic

International career
1886	Wales	1	(0)
- * Club domestic league appearances and goals

Richard Parry Williams (1863 - July 27, 1934) was a Welsh international footballer. He was part of the Wales national football team, playing 1 match on 10 April 1886 against Scotland .

Domestically he played for Carnarvon Athletic.
