= Berwyn Rangers F.C. =

Former association football club in Wales

Berwyn Rangers
- Full name: Berwyn Rangers Football Club
- Founded: 1872
- Dissolved: c. 1886
- Ground: Recreation Ground, Llangollen
- Secretary: H. S. Cope
Home colours

Berwyn Rangers Football Club were a Welsh football team from Llangollen, Denbighshire.

== History ==
The club was formed on Tuesday 22 October 1872, at the National Schoolroom by members of Llangollen Cricket Club, under the name Llangollen. Their first match was played on The Recreation Ground on Saturday 26 October 1872. The club reformed again on Monday 10 September 1877. The club has the honour of playing in the inaugural Welsh Cup competition. On 22 October 1880 the club changed their name to Berwyn Rangers.

On 22 October 1880, the club changed its name to Berwyn Rangers. Under its new name, it had its best run in the Welsh Cup, reaching the semi-final in 1883–84; the semi-final was played in Chirk, but bad weather left the pitch resembling a "ploughed field", and Berwyn went down to opponents Oswestry 2–1.

== Colours ==
The club's jerseys were claret.

== Cup History ==
Season	Competition	Round	Opposition	Score
1877–78	Welsh Cup	Round 1	23rd Royal Welsh Fusiliers	w/o
	Welsh Cup	Round 2	Gwersyllt Foresters	1–2
1878–79	Welsh Cup	Round 1	Mold	8–1
	Welsh Cup	Round 2	Newtown White Stars	0–1
1879–80	Welsh Cup	Round 1	Ruthin	0–4
1880–81	Welsh Cup	Round 1	Druids	1–3
1881-82	Welsh Cup	First Round	Oswestry	4-0
1882-83	Welsh Cup	First Round	Black Park	5-0
1882-83	Welsh Cup	Second Round	Oswestry White Stars	5-2
1882-83	Welsh Cup	Third Round	Northwich Victoria	1-1
1882-83	Welsh Cup	Third Round Replay	Northwich Victoria	1-1
1882-83	Welsh Cup	Fourth Round	Druids	2-5
1883-84	Welsh Cup	First Round	Ruthin	3-1
1883-84	Welsh Cup	Second Round	Bye	
1883-84	Welsh Cup	Third Round	Denbigh	5-1
1883-84	Welsh Cup	Fourth Round	Bye	
1883-84	Welsh Cup	Semi Final	Oswestry White Stars	1-2
1885-86	Welsh Cup	First Round	Rhostyllen Victoria	2-1
1885-86	Welsh Cup	First Round Replay	Rhostyllen Victoria	1-2

== Notable players ==
- Harry Adams - Wales Football International
- John Jones - Wales Football International
- John Roberts - Wales Football International
- William Roberts - Wales Football International

== Other Info ==
Also see Llangollen Town F.C.
