= William Roberts (footballer, born 1859) =

Welsh footballer

Personal information
- Full name: William Roberts
- Date of birth: 1859
- Place of birth: Llangollen, Wales
- Date of death: Not known
- Position: Forward

Senior career*
Years	Team	Apps	(Gls)
1878–1880	Llangollen		
1880	Crewe Alexandra		
1880–1881	Northwich Victoria		
1881–1882	Berwyn Rangers		
1884–18??	Llangollen		

International career
1879–1883	Wales	6	(2)
- * Club domestic league appearances and goals

William Roberts (born 1859) was a Welsh footballer who played as a forward in the 1870s and 1880s and made six appearances for Wales, scoring twice.

== Football career ==
Roberts was born in Llangollen in north-east Wales and started his football career at his local club.

His international debut came when he was selected in place of his Llangollen colleague, Jack Roberts, for the first international match between Wales and England on 18 January 1879. Roberts was one of only two of the Welsh team who were not associated with the Oswestry club, the other being John Price. The match was played at the Kennington Oval and was shortened to two halves of only 30 minutes each because of the heavy snowfall. Roberts, playing at outside-left, "scored" against England, but the goal was ruled out for an earlier infringement; England won the match 2–1.

Roberts became a regular in the Welsh side, missing only one match over the next two years. In the match against Scotland on 27 March 1880, Roberts scored a late consolation goal in a 5–1 defeat. Roberts was described in the match report as "conspicuous throughout for his clever play" and received "loud applause" for his goal. This was the first Welsh goal scored in an international against Scotland.

He had a brief foray into professional football, playing for English clubs Crewe Alexandra and Northwich Victoria in 1880 and 1881, before returning to his hometown with Berwyn Rangers.

== International appearances ==
Roberts made six appearances for Wales in official international matches, as follows:

Date	Venue	Opponent	Result	Goals	Competition
18 January 1879	Kennington Oval, London	England	1–2	0	Friendly
7 April 1879	Racecourse Ground, Wrexham	Scotland	0–3	0	Friendly
15 March 1880	Racecourse Ground, Wrexham	England	2–3	1	Friendly
27 March 1880	Hampden Park, Glasgow	Scotland	1–5	1	Friendly
14 March 1881	Racecourse Ground, Wrexham	Scotland	1–5	0	Friendly
12 March 1883	Racecourse Ground, Wrexham	Scotland	0–3	0	Friendly

Win	Draw	Loss
