= Brymbo Institute Cricket and Football Club =

Former sports club in Wales

Brymbo Institute
- Full name: Brymbo Institute Cricket and Football Club
- Founded: 1888
- Dissolved: 3 June 1921 (merged with Brymbo Green F.C. to form Brymbo and Green United FC)
- Ground: Institute Recreation Ground, Brymbo
- 1920–21: North Wales Alliance League Division One 4th
Home colours

Brymbo Institute Cricket and Football Club was a multi purpose sports club based in Brymbo, Wales.

== History ==
The club has its roots in the establishment of the Brymbo Institute and Reading Room, set up by non-conformist and Victorian industrialist William Darby. It was not as successful as he hoped, as few steelworkers were teetotalers, whilst the Darbys were great supporters of the temperance movement and so banned the sale of alcohol from their premises and land. The steelworkers later took over the Institute and managed it themselves. The institute supported cricket, rifle, tennis and bowls clubs, financed the silver band and supplied newspapers and magazines for the reading room.

Brymbo Institute FC merged with local rivals Brymbo Green FC on 3 June 1921. The merger created a new club called Brymbo and Green United FC. The new club disbanded in 1926.

== Colours ==
The club originally wore blue and white stripes.

== Seasons ==
Season	League	Position
1892–93	Welsh Senior League	3rd
1893–94	Welsh Senior League	3rd
1894–95	Welsh Senior League	5th
1895–96	Welsh Senior League	5th
1907–08	Wrexham & District League Division Two	5th
1908–09	Wrexham & District League Division Two	1st
1919–20	North Wales Alliance League Division One	3rd
1920–21	North Wales Alliance League Division One	4th

== Cup history ==
Season	Competition	Round	Opposition	Score	Notes
1890–91	Welsh Cup	First Round	Gresford	2–2	
1890–91	Welsh Cup	First Round Replay	Gresford	1–2	
1891–92	Welsh Cup	First Round	Westminster Rovers	3–4	Ordered to Replay after protest
1891–92	Welsh Cup	First Round Replay	Westminster Rovers	1–4	
1892–93	Welsh Cup	First Round	Druids	2–2	
1892–93	Welsh Cup	First Round Replay	Druids	1–11	
1893–94	Welsh Cup	First Round	Rhosllanerchrugog	3–5	
1893–94	Welsh Cup	Second Round	Westminster Rovers	2–3	
1894–95	Welsh Cup	First Round	Rhostyllen Victoria	4–1	
1894–95	Welsh Cup	Second Round	Rhosllanerchrugog	4–1	
1894–95	Welsh Cup	Third Round	Druids	1–0	
1894–95	Welsh Cup	Fourth Round	Bangor	1–0	
1894–95	Welsh Cup	Semi Final	Wrexham	0–4	
1895–96	Welsh Cup	Fourth Round	Aberystwyth	2–3	Bye to Fourth Round as previous seasons Semi Finalists
1895–96	Denbighshire and Flintshire Charity Cup	First Round	Buckley Victoria		
1895–96	Denbighshire and Flintshire Charity Cup	Final	Chirk	2–3	
1896–97	Welsh Cup	First Round	Rhosllanerchrugog	w/o	
1896–97	Welsh Cup	Second Round	Bye		
1896–97	Welsh Cup	Third Round	Druids	1–3	
1897–98	Welsh Cup	First Round	Chirk	0–3	
1913–14	Welsh Cup	First Preliminary Round	Chirk	1–3	
1914–15	Welsh Cup	First Round	Chirk	w/o	Chirk withdrew
1914–15	Welsh Cup	Second Round	Rhos Church	w/o	Rhos Church withdrew
1914–15	Welsh Cup	Third Round	Bangor	4–1	
1914–15	Welsh Cup	Fourth Round	Wrexham	2–4	
1919–20	Welsh Cup	Preliminary Round	Rhosrobin	5–2	
1919–20	Welsh Cup	First Round	Oswestry Comrades	2–1	Abandoned due to darkness
1919–20	Welsh Cup	First Round Replay	Oswestry Comrades	3–2	
1919–20	Welsh Cup	Second Round	Rhos	1–1	
1919–20	Welsh Cup	Second Round Replay	Rhos	1–3	
1920–21	Welsh Cup	Second Preliminary Round	Rhosrobin	1–1	
1920–21	Welsh Cup	Second Preliminary Round Replay	Rhosrobin	3–3	
1920–21	Welsh Cup	Second Preliminary Round Second Replays	Rhosrobin	7–0	
1920–21	Welsh Cup	First Round	Powell's	2–2	
1920–21	Welsh Cup	First Round Replay	Powell's	1–0	
1920–21	Welsh Cup	Second Round	Wellington St George	2–4	
1921–22	Welsh Cup	Second Preliminary Round	Mynydd Isa	2–2	
1921–22	Welsh Cup	Second Preliminary Round Replay	Mynydd Isa	0–0	
1921–22	Welsh Cup	Second Preliminary Round Second Replays	Mynydd Isa	1–0	
1921–22	Welsh Cup	First Round	Summerhill United	1–4	

== Honours ==
=== League ===
- Welsh Senior League

Third : 1893, 1894

- Wrexham and District League Division 2

Winners : 1909

- North Wales Alliance League Division One

Third : 1920

=== Cups ===
- Denbighshire and Flintshire Charity Cup

Runner-up : 1896

== Notable players ==
Previously or Went onto play Professional or International Football.

- Joseph Rogers – Wales International
- G.F Kelly – Wales International
- Jack Newnes – Wales International
- John Matthias – Wales International

== Other information ==
Not to be confused with Brymbo Victoria, Brymbo Steelworks FC or Brymbo FC.
