= Crewe Britannia F.C. =

English association football club, 1873–1894

Crewe Britannia
- Full name: Crewe Britannia Football Club
- Nickname(s): the Britons
- Founded: 1873
- Dissolved: 1894
- Ground: Edleston Road
- Secretary: R. J. Collier
Home colours

Crewe Britannia Football Club was an English football club from Crewe in Cheshire.

== History ==
The club was founded in 1873 as a rugby club, with regular matches against clubs such as Widnes and Runcorn.

Before the start of the 1883–84 season, perhaps inspired by the example of Crewe Alexandra, the club switched to association football, and indeed had the assistance of some Alexandra players in some of its early matches, such as a 4–0 win at Whitchurch Alexandria in September 1883.

The only national competition the club entered was the 1885–86 Welsh Cup. In the first round, the club beat Chester 3–0 in the first round (Chester handicapped by playing for 70 minutes with 10 men, due to an injury to Sissons), but lost 5–1 at Crewe Alexandra in the second, despite holding a half-time lead.

The club at this time could attract 600 spectators, and played a friendly at Newton Heath, but Britannia was never so ambitious again, and descended into more local football. This may have been due to the "depressed state of trade" or that Alexandra could attract several thousand to its FA Cup ties.

By its final seasons, the club had been reduced to playing in the Crewe Junior Cup, and in 1893–94 it lost at Audlem in the first round. The final match recorded for the club was a 6–2 defeat against the Crewe Athletic reserve side in February 1894.

== Colours ==
The club wore green and white.

== Ground ==
The club's first ground was in Rockwood Lane. By 1878 it had moved to a ground on Edleston Road, and it used the Imperial Hotel for its facilities.

== Notable players ==
- Stephen Finney and Hay Frederick Donaldson played rugby for the club in 1874.
