= Wrexham Hibernians F.C. =

Former association football club in Wales

Wrexham Hibernians
- Full name: Wrexham Hibernians Football Club
- Nicknames: Irishmen, Hibs
- Founded: c. 1889
- Dissolved: c. 1891
- Ground: Bradley Road

Wrexham Hibernians Football Club was a short-lived Welsh association football club based in Wrexham who played in the Welsh Cup during the 1890–91 season. They were nicknamed the Irishmen and were made up of people from the Irish diaspora. They were first mentioned in 1889 and last appeared in the local press in 1891. They played their home games off Bradley Road, Wrexham.

== Cup History ==
Season	Competition	Round	Opposition	Score	Remarks
1890–91	Welsh Cup	First Round	Overton	2–2	
1890–91	Welsh Cup	First Round	Overton	3–2	Replay
1890–91	Welsh Cup	Second Round	Rhostyllen Victoria	3–5	
