= Hay Frederick Donaldson =

British Army general

Brigadier-General Sir Hay Frederick Donaldson KCB FIMechE
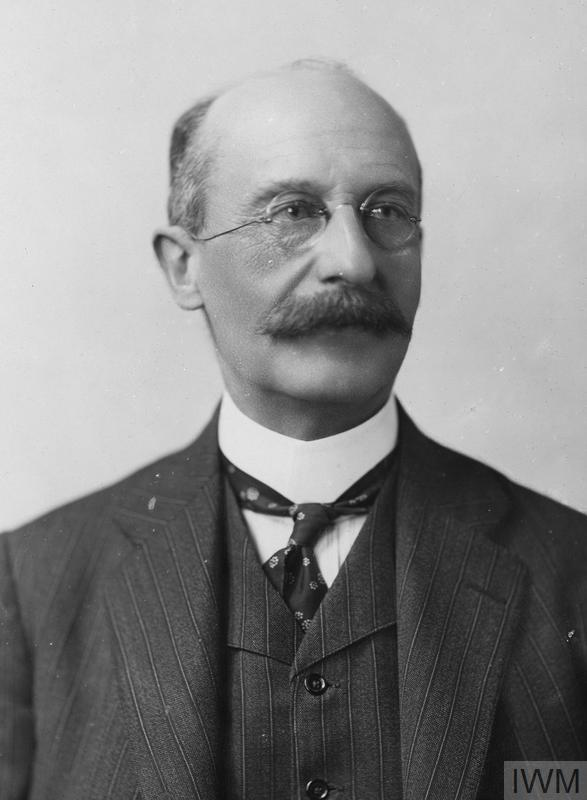
- Born: 7 July 1856; Sydney, Colony of New South Wales
- Died: 5 June 1916 (aged 59); HMS Hampshire, off the Orkney Islands

Brigadier-General Sir Hay Frederick Donaldson KCB (7 July 1856 – 5 June 1916) was a Colony of New South Wales-born English mechanical engineer.

== Early life ==
He was born at Sydney, Colony of New South Wales, son of Sir Stuart Alexander Donaldson, the first Premier of New South Wales. He was educated at Eton College, Trinity College, Cambridge, University of Edinburgh and Zurich University.

== Career ==
Initially employed at the London and North Western Railway locomotive works at Crewe, Cheshire, he worked on railway and harbour construction at Goa, India, from 1884 to 1887, and on Manchester Ship Canal from 1887 to 1891. He was Chief Engineer at London's India Docks from 1892 to 1897.

Alongside his latter two projects, he was based as Chief Mechanical Engineer at the Royal Ordnance Factories, Woolwich, from 1889 to 1903, during which period he also served as its Deputy Director-General in 1898–99. He was appointed Director-General in 1903 and continued until, in the First World War, he resigned to take up his last appointment, as Chief Technical Adviser to the Ministry of Munitions, then headed by David Lloyd George, in September 1915. He was also commissioned in the army with the rank of brigadier-general.

He was made CB in 1909 and promoted to KCB in 1911. He was president of the Institution of Mechanical Engineers in 1913 and 1914.

== Death ==
He was one of the advisers selected to accompany the Secretary of State for War Lord Kitchener on a mission to Russia in June 1916 and perished, aged fifty-nine, with all but 12 others when their ship, HMS Hampshire, struck a mine laid by German U-boat U-75 off the Orkney Islands. His body was never recovered and he is commemorated on the Commonwealth War Graves Commission's Hollybrook Memorial at Southampton, Hampshire.

== Personal life ==
On 15 July 1884, he married Selina Beresford (1859–1938), daughter of Colonel Marcus Beresford MP. They had three children.

Donaldson was a keen rugby player while at Crewe, for Crewe Britannia in 1874.

Professional and academic associations
Preceded by Edward B. Ellington	President of the Institution of Mechanical Engineers; 1913–1914	Succeeded by William Unwin
