= Bob Roberts (footballer, born 1863) =

Welsh footballer

Personal information
- Full name: Robert Roberts
- Date of birth: 1863
- Place of birth: Wrexham, Wales
- Date of death: 24 March 1950 (aged 86–87)
- Place of death: Wrexham, Wales
- Position: Full back

Youth career
- Rhostyllen

Senior career*
Years	Team	Apps	(Gls)
1884–1888	Wrexham Olympic		
1888–1892	Wrexham		

International career
1886–1887	Wales	2	(0)
- * Club domestic league appearances and goals

Robert Roberts (1863 – 24 March 1950) was a Welsh footballer who played at full back for Wrexham in the 1880s and 1890s. He made two appearances for Wales, one as an emergency goalkeeper.

== Playing career ==
Roberts was born at Wrexham and, on leaving school, found employment at Bersham colliery, and played football for the local Rhostyllen village side.

Described as a "hard-working player and a sound defender", Roberts was one of the first signings made by Wrexham Olympic after that club's formation. He took part in a North v South trial match in 1886 which led to his selection for the match against Ireland on 27 February, helping his country to a 5–0 victory. Despite this result, Alfred Davies was preferred for the matches against England and Scotland.

Roberts' second international appearance came the following February when he was called in as an emergency goalkeeper in the absence of Robert Mills-Roberts, who had temporarily "retired" from football following injuries to both wrists shortly before the preceding international against England, in which he conceded four goals. Roberts also conceded four goals against the Irish and his international career was over, with Davies being recalled at right-back for the next international. James Trainer subsequently took over as the Wales national team goalkeeper, a position he retained for the next twelve years.

In 1888, Wrexham Olympic was disbanded and Roberts joined Wrexham. With his ability to "kick and head the ball well", Roberts became the Wrexham captain, a position he retained until his retirement from football in 1892. In 1891, he captained his team to the final of the Welsh Cup, losing 5–2 to Shrewsbury Town.

== Later career ==
Following his retirement as a player, Roberts continued to serve Wrexham as a trainer for several years.

He was also a keen member of the Territorial Army.

== Family ==
His brother, Bill also played for Wrexham and played four times for Wales, scoring once, against Ireland on 27 February 1886.

His brother-in-law, John Price Davies, played for Druids and made two appearances for Wales in 1883.

== Honours ==
Wrexham

- Welsh Cup finalist: 1891
