= Joseph Rogers (footballer) =

Welsh footballer

Personal information
- Date of birth: 1861 or 1862
- Place of birth: Brymbo, Wales
- Place of death: Wrexham, Wales
- Position: Right-back

Senior career*
Years	Team	Apps	(Gls)
1891–1895	Brymbo Institute		
1895–1901	Wrexham		
1908	Coedpoeth		

International career
1896	Wales	3	(0)
- * Club domestic league appearances and goals

Joseph Rogers (born 1861 or 1862) was a Welsh international footballer. He was part of the Wales national football team, playing 3 matches. He played his first match on 29 February 1896 against Ireland and his last match on 21 March 1896 against Scotland.

At club level, he played for Brymbo Institute and Wrexham.

== See also ==
- List of Wales international footballers (alphabetical)
