= John Matthias (footballer) =

Welsh footballer

Personal information
- Full name: John Samuel Matthias
- Date of birth: 1878
- Place of birth: Wrexham, Wales
- Position: Defender

Senior career*
Years	Team	Apps	(Gls)
–1896	Brymbo Institute		
1896–1898	Shrewsbury Town		
1898–1901	Wolverhampton Wanderers	44	(0)
1901	Wrexham		
Total		44	(0)

International career
1896–1899	Wales	5	(0)
- * Club domestic league appearances and goals

John Matthias (born 1878) was a Welsh international footballer. He was part of the Wales national football team between 1896 and 1899, playing 5 matches. He played his first match on 29 February 1896 against Ireland and his last match on 18 March 1899 against Scotland.

At club level, he played for Brymbo Institute, Shrewsbury Town, Wolverhampton Wanderers and Wrexham. At Wolves, he made 44 appearances in the English Football League.

== See also ==
- List of Wales international footballers (alphabetical)
