= John Mathias (rugby union) =

English rugby union player (1878–1940)

- Full name: John Lloyd Mathias
- Born: 23 August 1878 Cardigan, Wales
- Died: 21 November 1940 (aged 62) Bucklow, England

Rugby union career
- Position: Forward
International career
Years	Team	Apps	(Points)
1905	England	4	(0)

John Lloyd Mathias (23 August 1878 – 21 November 1940) was an English international rugby union player.

Born in Cardigan, Wales, Mathias was a forward and made 186 appearances for his club Bristol, which he captained from 1901 to 1903. He represented Gloucestershire and got called up by England in 1905, playing all three of their Home Nations matches, as well as an end of year international against the All Blacks.

== See also ==
- List of England national rugby union players
