= Carnarvon Athletic F.C. =

Welsh former football club, based in Caernarvon

Carnarvon Athletic
- Full name: Carnarvon Athletic Football Club
- Nicknames: C.A.C., Old Carnarvon
- Founded: 1876
- Dissolved: 1893; 133 years ago
- Ground: Coedhelen Ferry Field
- President: Sir Llewellyn Turner
- Secretary: C. P. Boucher
Home colours

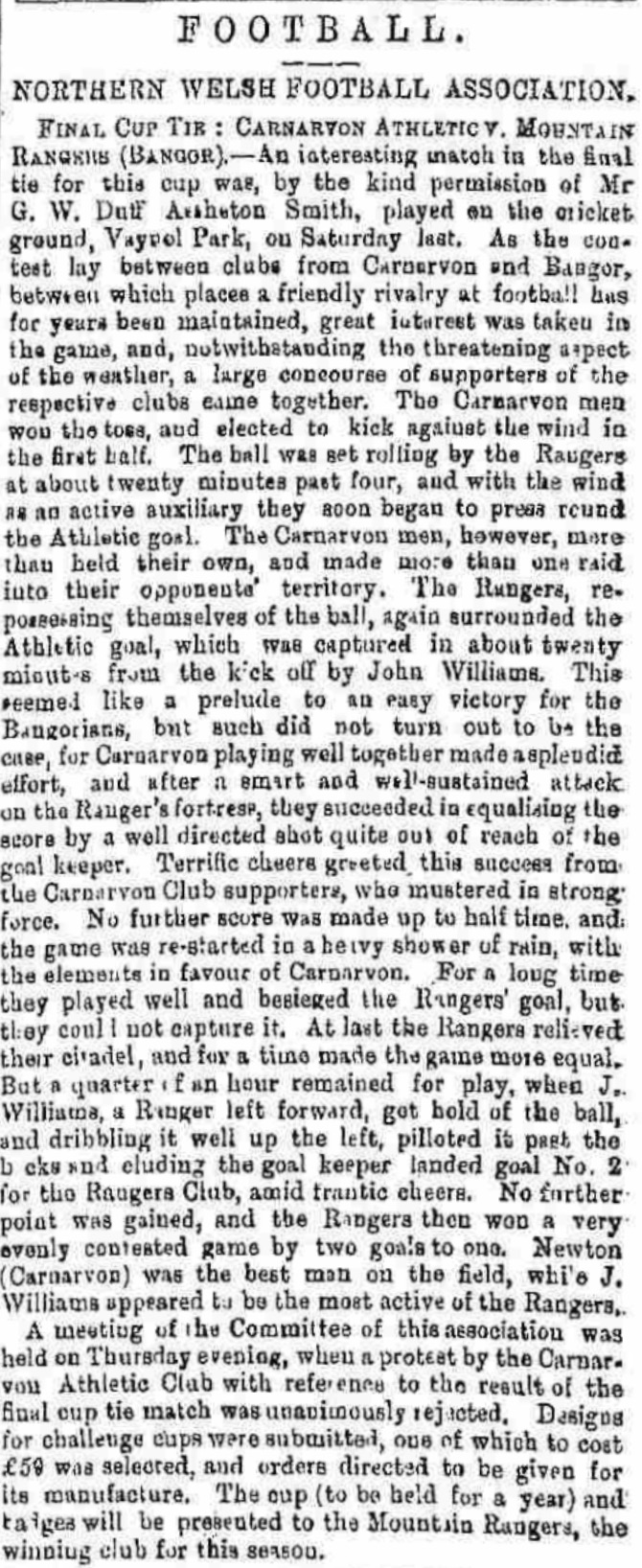
1881–82 North Welsh Cup Final, Mountain Rangers 2–1 Carnarvon Athletic, North Wales Chronicle, 11 March 1882

Carnarvon Athletic F.C. was an association football club from Caernarfon in north Wales.

== History ==
The club was formed in 1876, as a football side from an athletic club founded in 1866, and played 5 matches in its first season, winning one. It played in the first Welsh Cup in 1877–78, losing at home to Bangor in the first round.

After playing in the first two competitions, the club stepped back from the national competition, playing instead in the Northern Welsh Association Cup, which was first played in 1879–80; the club reached the semi-final stage, which consisted of 3 clubs, but did not draw the bye, and lost to Llanrwst. The club went one stage further in 1881–82, but lost to Mountain Rangers of Bangor in the final. It also apparently reached the final in 1883–84, but a protest from Bangor that the C.A.C.'s winning goal came from a foul was upheld, and Carnarvon refused to re-play the tie, instead launching a counter-protest (on the basis that the chairman could not hear the protest, as his club had not paid a subscription fee), which was dismissed.

Athletic re-entered the national competition from 1884–85, and reached the semi-final on its return, albeit after only winning one tie; in the last four, the club lost to Druids at the Racecourse Ground.

The club took over Carnarvon Wanderers at the end of the 1886–87 season, the Wanderers players (including star forward Harry Owen and secretary Humphreys) joining the club afterwards. The Athletic reserve team used the Wanderers name on at least one occasion afterwards.

Despite this boost to membership, the club only entered the Welsh Cup once more, in 1890–91, losing in the first round at home to Rhyl. The last reference to the club is a 4–1 defeat at Bangor in a charity match on 22 April 1893.

== Colours ==
The club played in scarlet and black, and later light and dark blue.

== Ground ==
The athletic club's ground was at a field close to Caernarfon Castle, on the opposite side of the Seiont, and belonged to one Rice W. Thomas. By 1877 the club was playing on a ground at Bethesda Road, 5 minutes from Carnarvon station. although the club was back at Mr Thomas' field - now called Coedhelen Ferry Field - by 1881. The club moved to The Oval in 1888.

== Notable players ==
- Richard Parry Williams, capped for Wales in 1886 when a Carnarvon Athletic player
