= Bill Roberts (footballer, born 1859) =

Welsh footballer

Personal information
- Full name: William Roberts
- Date of birth: 18 March 1859
- Place of birth: Wrexham, Wales
- Date of death: 12 June 1945 (aged 86)
- Place of death: Wrexham, Wales
- Position: Forward

Senior career*
Years	Team	Apps	(Gls)
1879–1883	Wrexham		
1883–1888	Wrexham Olympic		
1888–18??	Rhostyllen Victoria		

International career
1886–1887	Wales	4	(1)
- * Club domestic league appearances and goals

William Roberts (18 March 1859 – 12 June 1945) was a Welsh footballer who played as a forward for Wrexham, Wrexham Olympic and Rhostyllen Victoria in the 1880s and made four appearances for Wales, scoring once. He was the brother of Bob Roberts who also played for the two Wrexham clubs and twice for Wales.

== Football career ==
Roberts was "always in the thickest of the fight", and was described as "tricky and comical, and occasionally brilliant". His playing career came before the advent of League football and his greatest success at club level was in the Welsh Cup, where he scored the only goal in the final of the 1882–83 tournament, thus enabling Wrexham to defeat Druids and claim the trophy for the second time.

He and his brother, Bob, made their international debuts on 27 February 1886 against Ireland in the opening match of the 1886 British Home Championship. The match ended as a 5–0 victory for the Welsh, with Bill Roberts scoring the opening goal. After defeats against England and Scotland, Roberts was not called up for the February 1887 match against England. After an injury to Robert Mills-Roberts in the warm-up for that match (which Wales lost 4–0) the Roberts brothers were both recalled for the match against Ireland in March 1887, with Bob serving as an emergency goalkeeper. This match was the finale to the brothers' international careers with Bob conceding four goals.

== International appearances ==
Roberts made four appearances for Wales in official international matches, as follows:

Date	Venue	Opponent	Result	Goals	Competition
27 February 1886	Racecourse Ground, Wrexham	Ireland	5–0	1	1886 British Home Championship
29 March 1886	Racecourse Ground, Wrexham	England	1–3	0	1886 British Home Championship
10 April 1886	Cathkin Park, Glasgow	Scotland	1–4	0	1886 British Home Championship
12 March 1887	Oldpark Avenue, Belfast	Ireland	1–4	0	1887 British Home Championship

Win	Draw	Loss

== Career outside football ==
Roberts worked as coal-miner in his youth, but was later employed in a leather works.

== Honours ==
Wrexham

- Welsh Cup winners: 1883
