= John Jones (footballer, born 1860) =

Welsh footballer

Personal information
- Date of birth: 1860
- Place of birth: Wales
- Date of death: 1902 (aged 41–42)
- Position: Forward

Senior career*
Years	Team	Apps	(Gls)
- Berwyn Rangers

International career
1883–1884	Wales	3	(0)
- * Club domestic league appearances and goals

John Jones (1860 – 1902) was a Welsh international footballer. He was part of the Wales national football team between 1883 and 1884, playing 3 matches. He played his first match on 12 March 1883 against Scotland and his last match on 29 March 1884 against Scotland.

At club level, he played as a forward for Berwyn Rangers.

== See also ==
- List of Wales international footballers (alphabetical)
