= Wrexham Excelsior F.C. =

Former association football club in Wales

Wrexham Excelsior
- Full name: Wrexham Excelsior Football Club
- Founded: c. 1884
- Dissolved: c. 1895

Wrexham Excelsior were a football club who played in the Welsh Cup in 1886–87, and 1887–88 season. The football club are first mentioned in 1884, and are presumed to have folded around 1895.

== Cup History ==
Season	Competition	Round	Opposition	Score
1886–87	Welsh Cup	First Round	Chirk	1–10
1887–88	Welsh Cup	First Round	Vale of Llangollen	0–5
