= Carnarvon Wanderers F.C. =

Carnarvon Wanderers
- Full name: Carnarvon Wanderers Football Club
- Nicknames: the Wanderers, the Canary Birds
- Founded: 1885
- Dissolved: 1887
- Ground: Bryn Seiont
Home colours

Carnarvon Wanderers F.C. was a short-lived association football club from Caernarfon in north Wales, notable for being the first club from a Welsh-speaking area to enter the FA Cup.

== History ==
Although a team called Carnarvon Wanderers was reported to have lost at the Carnarvon Athletic second team in December 1883, this particular club was founded in November 1885. The first competition success was at the annual Carnarvon Boxing Day tournament in 1885, beating Carnarvon Athletic's first team in the final. During the 1885–86 season the Wanderers had two remarkable matches against Bangor, losing 9–0 in the first (apparently because they were "palpably afraid of being molested") but winning 7–0 in the second.

One defeat the club had that season was in court. The club had arranged two friendlies with Llanrwst (in the jargon of the day, called "home-and-home" fixtures) but, at 1 p.m. on the day of the match (19 December), the Llanrwst club sent a telegram stating that "the club is smashed" and it could not attend. The Wanderers' secretary sued to cover the cost of printing posters and arranging for a brake (a horse-drawn bus) to bring the Llanrwst team from the station to the ground (£1 8s 3d), but the claim was dismissed on the basis that there was no contract between the teams.

=== Cup entries ===
In 1886–87, the club entered the FA Cup and the Welsh Cup for the only time. In the first round of the latter, the club beat Portmadoc 3–1 in the first round, but in the first round of the former, lost away to Stoke. For half-an-hour, the Wanderers kept Stoke out, with the home fans shouting such encouragement as "Play up Stoke or these Welshmen will give you a surprise if you don't mind", but the Wanderers goalkeeper John Davies then had his wrist broken by a kick, and Stoke rattled in ten easy goals. The Wanderers scored a consolation goal when the Stoke goalkeeper Rowley had gone upfield to see if he too could score. Nevertheless, the Wanderers' back Griffith Davies impressed Stoke so much that the club asked him to guest for them against Preston North End. The club stopped off at Chester on the way back to visit the theatre.

The club was scheduled to meet Bangor in the third round of the Welsh Cup (having received a bye in the second), but pulled out of a friendly due to take place after the FA Cup tie; ostensibly because of injuries from the Stoke match, and possibly because of a fear of violence after some fractious encounters with the Bangorians. The situation had deteriorated to the extent that the Wanderers secretary, John Humphreys, made a public plea to spectators.

The plea worked to an extent that the Wanderers played a friendly at Bangor the next month and "were grandly treated" by the spectators, who were obviously pleased that Bangor won 8–3, and Humphreys wrote to the local press commending the treatment the Wanderers had received at Bangor. The Wanderers beat another Bangor side (Olympic) 11–0 soon afterwards, and the Wanderers again won the local Boxing Day tournament. There was however some controversy over the tournament, with Caernarfon officials reportedly favouring the Caernarfon sides, the Wanderers' play being described as "a disgrace to football and anywhere but on their own ground would be publicly execrated".

When the tie took place in January 1887, "everyone seemed to enjoy the game"; for the Wanderers, however, it was a disaster, the club losing 7–2, both of its goals coming when the club had already conceded seven. Griffith Davies was again marked out as "by far the best back on the field" but also noted for his "rough game all throughout". The defeat was put down to the Wanderers playing a long ball game, while Bangor made better use of possession with shorter passes and more clinical finishing.

=== End of club ===
Although the club finished the season with some strong wins (e.g. 10–0 over Llanfairfechan and 7–0 over the University of Wales), it dissolved at the end of the season; its players (including star forward Harry Owen and secretary Humphreys) joined Carnarvon Athletic.

The members seem to have decided that there was no possibility of challenging Bangor's North Welsh supremacy unless there was a united club in Caernarfon. The club lost four times to Bangor in 1886–87. On top of the Cup tie defeat and the 8-3 defeat in December, the Wanderers lost to Bangor in two other fixtures that season: a 4-1 defeat in February and 3-0 at the end of the season, even though Bangor had to rely on a late volunteer in the latter match, as they only had ten men turn up, and the Wanderers in turn having one man sent off for a kick.

The name was briefly revived for a tournament at the end of the 1887-88 season, probably for the Athletic reserve team.

== Colours ==
The club played in cardinal and royal blue "quartered" (i.e. halved) shirts, with a yellow sash.

== Notable players ==
Hugh Vincent, rugby union international, played in the FA Cup match
