= John Roberts (footballer, born 1857) =

Welsh footballer

Personal information
- Date of birth: 1857
- Place of birth: Llangollen, Wales
- Position: Left wing

Senior career*
Years	Team	Apps	(Gls)
1879–1883	Corwen		
1883	Berwyn Rangers		

International career
1879–1883	Wales	7	(1)
- * Club domestic league appearances and goals

John Roberts (born 1857) was a Welsh international footballer. He was part of the Wales national football team between 1879 and 1883, playing 7 matches and scoring 1 goal. He played his first match on 7 April 1879 against Scotland and his last match on 3 February 1883 against England.

At club level he played on the Left Wing for Corwen and Berwyn Rangers.

== See also ==
- List of Wales international footballers (alphabetical)
