= Rhostyllen Victoria F.C. =

Former association football club in Wales

Rhostyllen Victoria
- Full name: Rhostyllen Victoria Football Club
- Founded: Appr. 1881
- Dissolved: 1897
- Ground: Rhostyllen
Home colours

Rhostyllen Victoria was a Welsh football club based in Rhostyllen, Wrexham during the Victorian era.

== Colours ==
By 1895 the club was playing in white shirts.

== League history ==
They played in the Welsh Senior League from 1890 to 1897

== Cup History ==
Season	Competition	Round	Opposition	Score	Notes
1881–82	Welsh Cup	First Round	Corwen Mountaineers	6–1	
1881–82	Welsh Cup	Second Round	Ruthin	0–11	
1883–84	Welsh Cup	First Round	Wrexham Crown	1–1	
1883–84	Welsh Cup	First Round	Wrexham Crown	1–1	Replay.
1883–84	Welsh Cup	Second Round	Wrexham	0–2	
1883–84	Denbighshire Challenge Cup	Semi Final	Rhos Olympic	3–1	
1883–84	Denbighshire Challenge Cup	Final	Wrexham Olympic		
1884–85	Welsh Cup	First Round	Wrexham Crown	0–5	Rhostyllen Victoria in Second Round
1884–85	Welsh Cup	Second Round	Chirk	0–4	
1885–86	Welsh Cup	First Round	Berwyn Rangers	1–2	
1885–86	Welsh Cup	First Round	Berwyn Rangers	2–1	Replay
1885–86	Welsh Cup	Second Round		Bye	
1885–86	Welsh Cup	Third Round	Druids	0–0	
1885–86	Welsh Cup	Third Round	Druids	1–5	Replay
1887–88	Welsh Cup	First Round	Druids	0–3	
1888–89	Welsh Cup	First Round	Corwen	8–1	
1888–89	Welsh Cup	Second Round	Vale of Llangollen	3–3	
1888–89	Welsh Cup	Second Round	Vale of Llangollen	2–1	Replay
1888–89	Welsh Cup	Third Round	Wrexham	0–1	
1888–89	Welsh Cup	Third Round	Wrexham	0–4	Replay after Protest
1890–91	Welsh Cup	First Round	Ruabon	1–1	
1890–91	Welsh Cup	First Round	Ruabon	1–3	Replay
1890–91	Welsh Cup	Second Round	Wrexham Hibernians	5–3	
1890–91	Welsh Cup	Third Round	Chirk	1–2	
1891–92	Welsh Cup	First Round	Wrexham	1–2	
1891–92	Soames Charity Cup	First Round	Rhosllanerchrugog	9–2	
1891–92	Soames Charity Cup	Second Round	Gresford		
1891–92	Soames Charity Cup	Third Round	Westminster Rovers	2–1	
1891–92	Soames Charity Cup	Fourth Round	Flint	1–5	
1892–93	Welsh Cup	First Round	Denbigh	w/o	Denbigh withdrew
1892–93	Welsh Cup	Second Round	Rhosllanerchrugog	2–2	
1892–93	Welsh Cup	Second Round	Rhosllanerchrugog	1–1	Replay
1892–93	Welsh Cup	Second Round	Rhosllanerchrugog	2–3	Second Replay
1892–93	Soames Charity Cup	First Round	Brymbo Institute		
1893–94	Welsh Cup	First Round	Westminster Rovers	0–3	
1894–95	Welsh Cup	First Round	Brymbo Institute	1–4	
1894–95	Soames Charity Cup	First Round	Rhosllanerchrugog	4–0	
1894–95	Soames Charity Cup	Second Round	Brymbo Institute	3–2	
1894–95	Soames Charity Cup	Third Round	Westminster Rovers	2–1	
1894–95	Soames Charity Cup	Semi Final	Wrexham	0–2	
1895–96	Welsh Cup	First Round	Wrockwardine Wood	0–2	
1895–96	Soames Charity Cup	First Round		Bye	
1895–96	Soames Charity Cup	Second Round	Chirk	1–9	
1896–97	Welsh Cup	First Round	Westminster Rovers	2–0	
1896–97	Welsh Cup	Second Round	Druids	0–8	

== Notable players ==
- (Wales) Alf Pugh Achieved International honours as a Rhostyllen Victoria player, also first ever person to be substituted in an International football match.
- (Wales) Bill Roberts Achieved International honours.

== Other Notes ==
Listed as having striped jerseys in 1889, exact colours are unknown. Source from 1885 lists them as playing in white shirts.
