= Davenham F.C. =

Davenham
- Full name: Davenham Football Club
- Nickname: the Villagers
- Founded: 1879
- Dissolved: 1890
- Ground: Oddfellows Arms
Home colours

Davenham F.C. was an English association football club, from Davenham, Cheshire.

== History ==
=== Foundation ===
The club was founded in 1879 by schoolmaster Matthew Earlam. Earlam had discovered the game at York College in 1873 and been a centre-forward with Northwich Victoria, and founded Davenham FC on his move to the village in 1879, although he continued playing for Victoria, winning the Cheshire Senior Cup with them as a player in 1881. The first recorded fixtures of the club are from September 1881.

The club competed first entered the FA Cup in 1883–84, Earlam scoring the team's first-ever Cup goal with a header in the 2–0 win against Macclesfield Town. The club lost 5–1 at home to Northwich Victoria in the second, in front of the club's biggest crowd of 2,000, although the game was marred by a ruptured kidney suffered by Victoria's half-back Shaw.

=== 1885–86 season ===
Davenham's finest season was 1885–86; with Earlam training the side every week, the club won the Cheshire Cup for the only time, and went further in the FA Cup than any Cheshire side hitherto.

In the FA Cup that season, the club was drawn to play Goldenhill Wanderers F.C. in the first round, at home; Goldenhill walked off when the referee awarded a goal to Davenham just before half-time when Goldenhill thought they should have had a throw-in. The referee recorded the final score as being 3–1. In the second round, the club hammered Macclesfield Town 8–1, and even the Macclesfield goal was an own goal.

In the third round, the club beat Crewe Alexandra 2–1, although an indication of the difference between the clubs of the Cheshire "division" of the FA Cup and those elsewhere in the country is that only 1,200 turned up for the tie; crowds elsewhere were much higher, even Darwen Old Wanderers F.C. attracting 2,000.

As there were no further matches in the Cheshire division, the club did not have to play a fourth round tie, and in the fifth was drawn away to Small Heath Alliance. The Villagers' run came to an end with a 2–1 defeat in front of a crowd of "between 4,000 and 5,000 persons assembled together at Small Heath on Saturday afternoon, which was probably the biggest crowd ever assembled on the Coventry‐road meadow".

In the Cheshire Cup, which saw 25 entrants, Davenham beat Bollington 10–0 in the second round, received a bye in the third, and beat Macclesfield 4–1 in the semi-final, thanks in part to "wretched goal-keeping", due to Macclesfield having to rely on a reserve between the sticks.

Davenham met Crewe Alexandra in the final at Middlewich, with 5,000 spectators, carried on special trains from Crewe and Northwich. Davenham came from 1–0 down at half-time to win the match 2–1, thanks to a goal from a late scrimmage.

=== Welsh Cup final ===
The club had entered the Welsh Cup from the 1881–82 season, and first got past the first round in 1883–84, with a 16–0 win over Holywell Rovers. The club's best run in the tournament came in 1886–87; a walkover, two replay victories (one of which a rare win over Northwich Victoria), and a bye put the side in the semi-finals against Oswestry. The club won 2–1 and faced Chirk A.A.A. in the final, played at Crewe's Nantwich Road ground, but lost by the same scoreline, the Davenham goal being a consolation with five minutes remaining. The Chirk officials praised Davenham as being "one of the nicest clubs they ever had the pleasure of playing".

=== Mergers ===
The rise of professionalism meant that Davenham could no longer compete at the top level; in its last FA Cup appearance as Davenham, in the first qualifying round in 1888–89, the club lost 3–0 to Wrexham.

For the 1889–90 season, the club merged with Hartford St John's F.C., a club from the next village to the west down the Chester Road, and played under the name Hartford & Davenham United, reaching the third round of the Welsh Cup, but losing in the second round of the FA Cup qualifying rounds to the professionals of Crewe Alexandra.

In December 1889, the two clubs and Northwich Victoria agreed on amalgamation, to take effect from May 1890, with a view to the merged side turning professional. The amalgamated club kept the Victoria name.

== Colours ==
The club played in maroon.

== Records ==
FA Cup

- Best performance: 1885–86: 5th Round (last 16)

Welsh Cup

- Runners-up: 1886–87

Cheshire Senior Cup

- Winners: 1885–86
- Runners-up: 1886–87
