= Mold F.C. =

Former Welsh association football club

- Full name: Mold Football Club
- Nickname: Moldavians
- Founded: 1886; 140 years ago
- Dissolved: 1930

Mold F.C. was a Welsh association football club. Formed in 1886, it participated in both the Welsh Cup (semifinalists in 1887–88, 1890–91 and 1924–25) and the English FA Cup (1924–25).

They were also founding members of the Welsh Senior League but withdrew partway through the first season.

The club's last active season was the 1929–30 season when it officially dissolved immediately after the season concluded.
