= Cyril Williams =

Cyril Williams may refer to:

- Cyril Williams (footballer) (1921–1980), English footballer
- Cyril Williams (athlete) (fl. 1934), Welsh sprinter
- Cyril Williams (rugby union) (1887–1978), English international rugby union player
- Cyril Herbert Williams (1908–1983), British colonial administrator
- Cyril G. Williams (1921–2004), Welsh religious scholar
- Cyril Williams, founder of traditional boat builders Williams and Parkinson Boat Builders
