= Betsan Moses =

Chief Executive of the National Eisteddfod of Wales (born 1971)

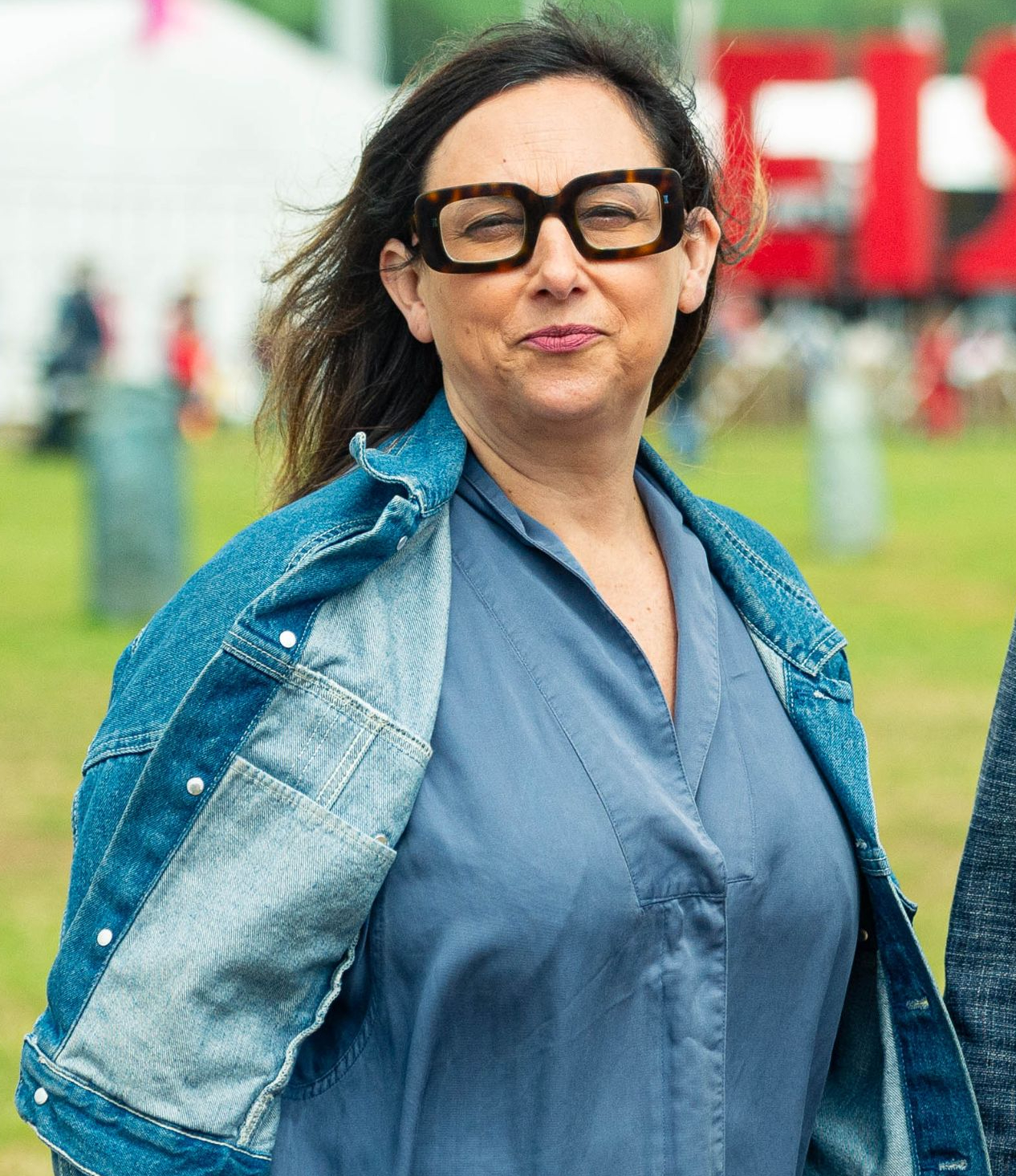
- Betsan Moses in 2023
- Born: 1971 (age 54–55); Pontyberem
- Education: Ysgol Gyfun Maes-yr-Yrfa, Aberystwyth University, University of Wales
- Occupation: Chief executive officer of the National Eisteddfod of Wales

Betsan Moses (born 1971) is the chief executive officer of the National Eisteddfod of Wales. Born in Pontyberem, she originally studied theatre and language acquisition, working with the Arts Council of Wales and the National Eisteddfod, before being appointed as the National Eisteddfod's chief executive officer in February 2018.

== Early life and education ==
Betsan Moses was born in Pontyberem, in the Gwendraeth Valley. She studied at Ysgol Gyfun Maes-yr-Yrfa, then studied theatre at Aberystwyth University. She later obtained a master's degree in language acquisition at the University of Wales.

== Career ==
Moses worked as a press and public relations officer with the company Cennad, then as an accounts manager with StrataMatrix. She worked as a lecturer at Trinity University College, Carmarthen, then as the dance and drama officer at the Arts Council of Wales. She joined the National Eisteddfod of Wales in April 1999, spending nine years there as a communications and marketing manager. In February 2009, she returned to the Arts Council of Wales as head of communications and public relations.

Moses was appointed as chief executive officer of the National Eisteddfod in February 2018 and started the role in June 2018, working in conjunction with her predecessor Elfed Roberts throughout the 2018 Eisteddfod in Cardiff.
