= Cwmmawr railway station =

Former railway station in Wales

Cwmmawr

General information
- Location: Llanelli, Carmarthenshire; Wales
- Coordinates: 51.7926°N 4.1327°W
- Grid reference: SN530125
- Platforms: 1

Other information
- Status: Disused

History
- Original company: Burry Port and Gwendraeth Valley Railway
- Pre-grouping: Great Western Railway
- Post-grouping: Great Western Railway

Key dates
- 29 January 1913: Station opened
- 21 September 1953: Station closed
Location

Cwmmawr for Tumble railway station, Cwm Mawr railway station or Cwmmawr railway station was opened in 1913 to timetabled passenger services. It continued to serve the inhabitants of the Cwmmawr area and hinterland between 1913 and 1953; it was one of several basic stations opened on the Burry Port and Gwendraeth Valley Railway in Carmarthenshire, Wales.

== History ==
Cwmmawr was opened for passengers on 29 January 1913 by the Burry Port and Gwendraeth Valley Railway on the Kidwelly and Cwmmawr section of the line and was closed by the Great Western Railway on Saturday 19 September 1953. It was on the Burry Port and Gwendraeth Valley Railway with Pontyates located to the south and Cwmmawr for Tumble as the terminus.

The railway was originally a freight only line apart from passenger trains for miners, but stations were established due to pressure from the public. The freight service continued for coal traffic until 1996 by which time the last of the local collieries had closed down. The line was carrying traffic from the washeries at Cwmmawr and Carway until closure.

== Infrastructure ==
The station had a single straight platform with a wooden ticket office and shelter. A goods shed stood to the west and several sidings together with a water tank. The line to the east of the platform continued to the north in 1915 and served a transfer point for the tramway down from Clos-yr-yn Colliery. To the south in 1915 was the extensive rail network that served the New Dynant Colliery.

The line was partly built on the old Kidwelly and Llanelly Canal however incline planes existed at sites such as Ponthenri.

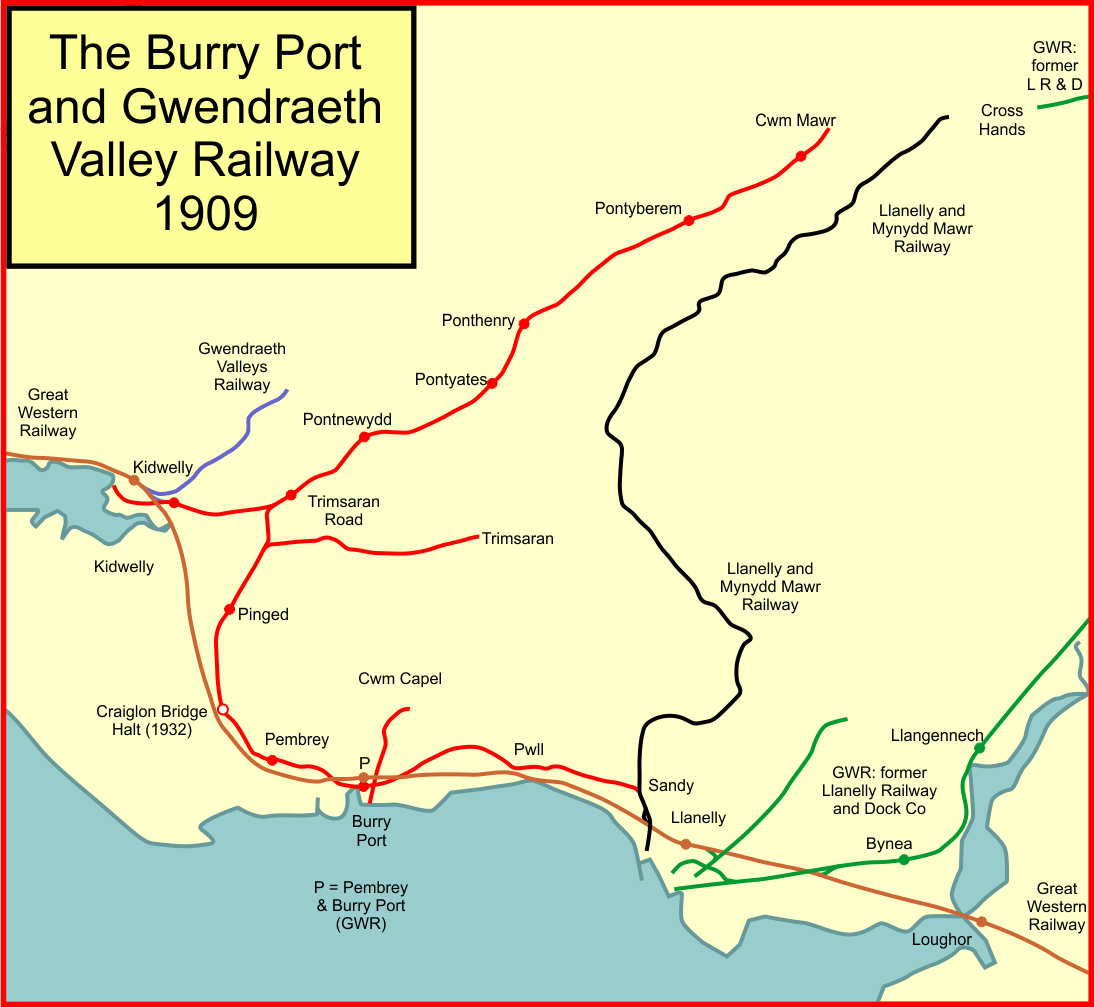
The BP&GVR system in 1909.

== Remnants ==
The section south of Pinged, between Burry Port and Craiglon Bridge Halt is now a footpath and cycleway, however other sections of the line have formal and informal footpaths on the old trackbed.

== Routes ==
Preceding station	Historical railways	Following station
Pontyberem; Line and station closed	Burry Port and Gwendraeth Valley Railway; Great Western Railway	Terminus; Line and station Closed

== See also ==
- West Wales lines
