= Pontyberem railway station =

Former railway station in Wales

Pontyberem
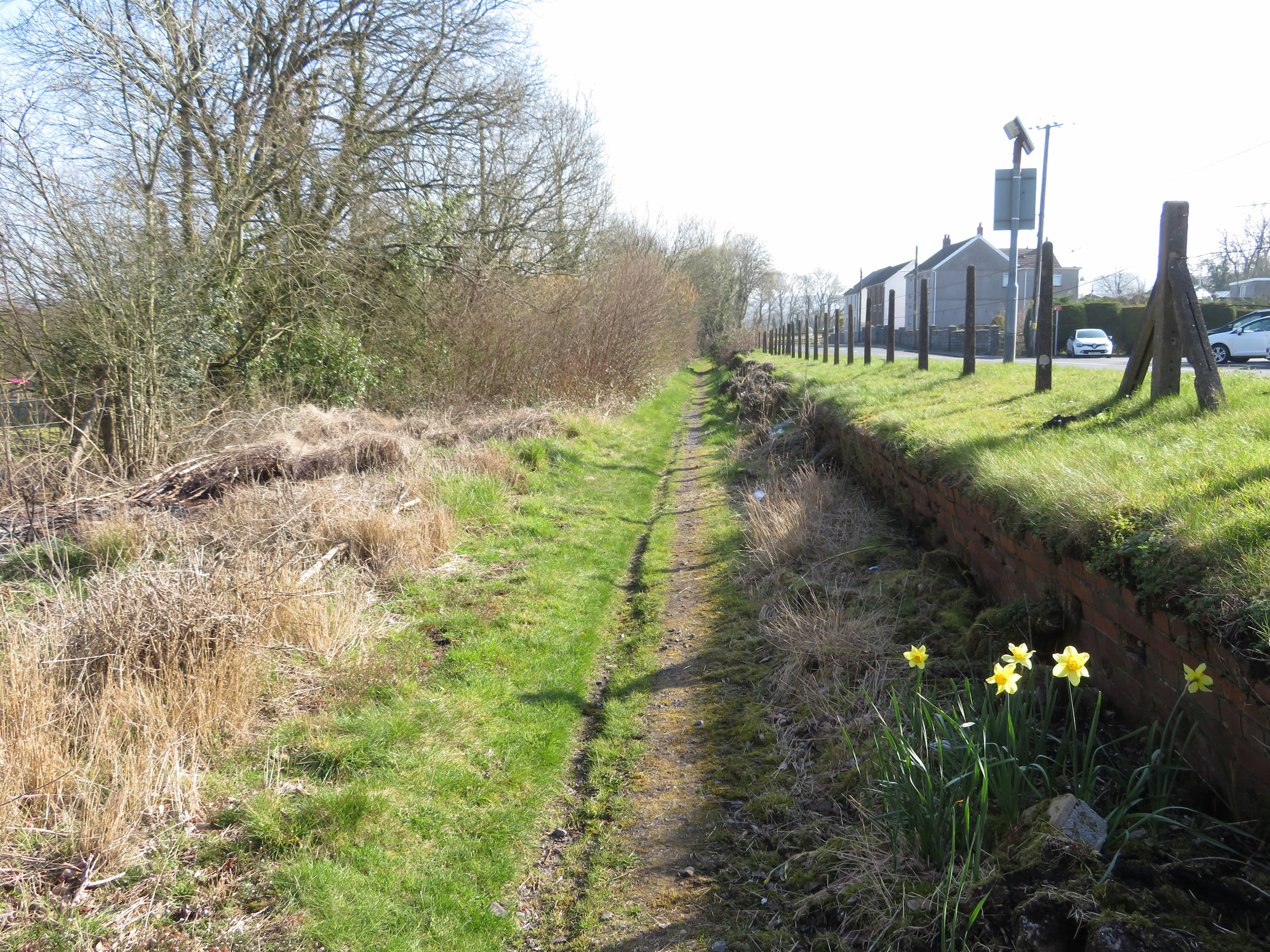
- The site of the station in 2022

General information
- Location: Llanelli, Carmarthenshire; Wales
- Coordinates: 51.7809°N 4.1635°W
- Grid reference: SN508113
- Platforms: 1

Other information
- Status: Disused

History
- Original company: Burry Port and Gwendraeth Valley Railway
- Pre-grouping: Great Western Railway
- Post-grouping: British Transport Commission

Key dates
- 2 August 1909: Station opened
- 21 September 1953: Station closed
Location

Pontyberem railway station was opened in 1909 to timetabled passenger services however services for miners began in 1898. It continued to serve the inhabitants of the Pontyberem area and hinterland between 1909 and 1953; it was one of several basic stations opened on the Burry Port and Gwendraeth Valley Railway in Carmarthenshire, Wales.

== History ==
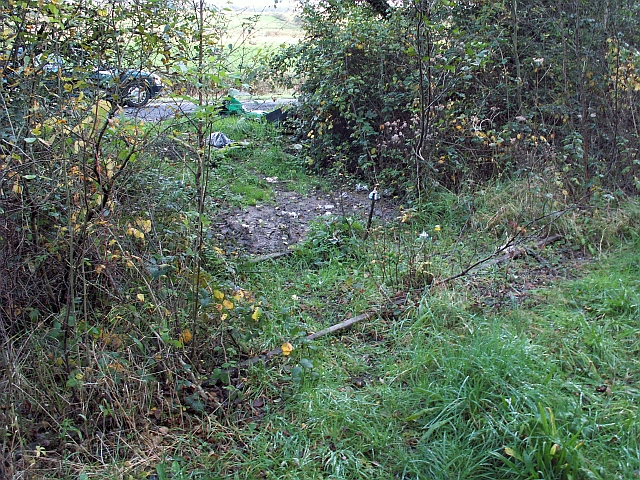
Old track near the site of Pont-y-Berem Slants Colliery in 1982.

Pontyberem station was opened on 2 August 1909 by the Burry Port and Gwendraeth Valley Railway on the Kidwelly and Cwmmawr section of the line and was closed by the Great Western Railway on Saturday 19 September 1953. It was on the Burry Port and Gwendraeth Valley Railway

The railway was originally a freight only line apart from passenger trains for miners, but stations were established due to pressure from the public. The freight service continued for coal traffic until 1996 by which time the last of the local collieries had closed down.

== Infrastructure ==
The station stood some way to the east of the village centre and had a single platform, a waiting room and ticket office built with corrugated iron and a passing loop with the through line for freight traffic. In 1915 the signal box stood at the eastern end of the platform and the station stood on the southern side of the line. Two water tanks were present in the station area. A goods shed stood to the west of the level crossing and a line ran off to a spoil heap to the north-west. To the east lay the extensive rail network of the Pont-y-Berem Slants Colliery.

By 1964 Pont-y-Berem Slants Colliery had closed, as had the station. The line was partly built on the old Kidwelly and Llanelly Canal, however incline planes were located at several sites such as Ponthenri.

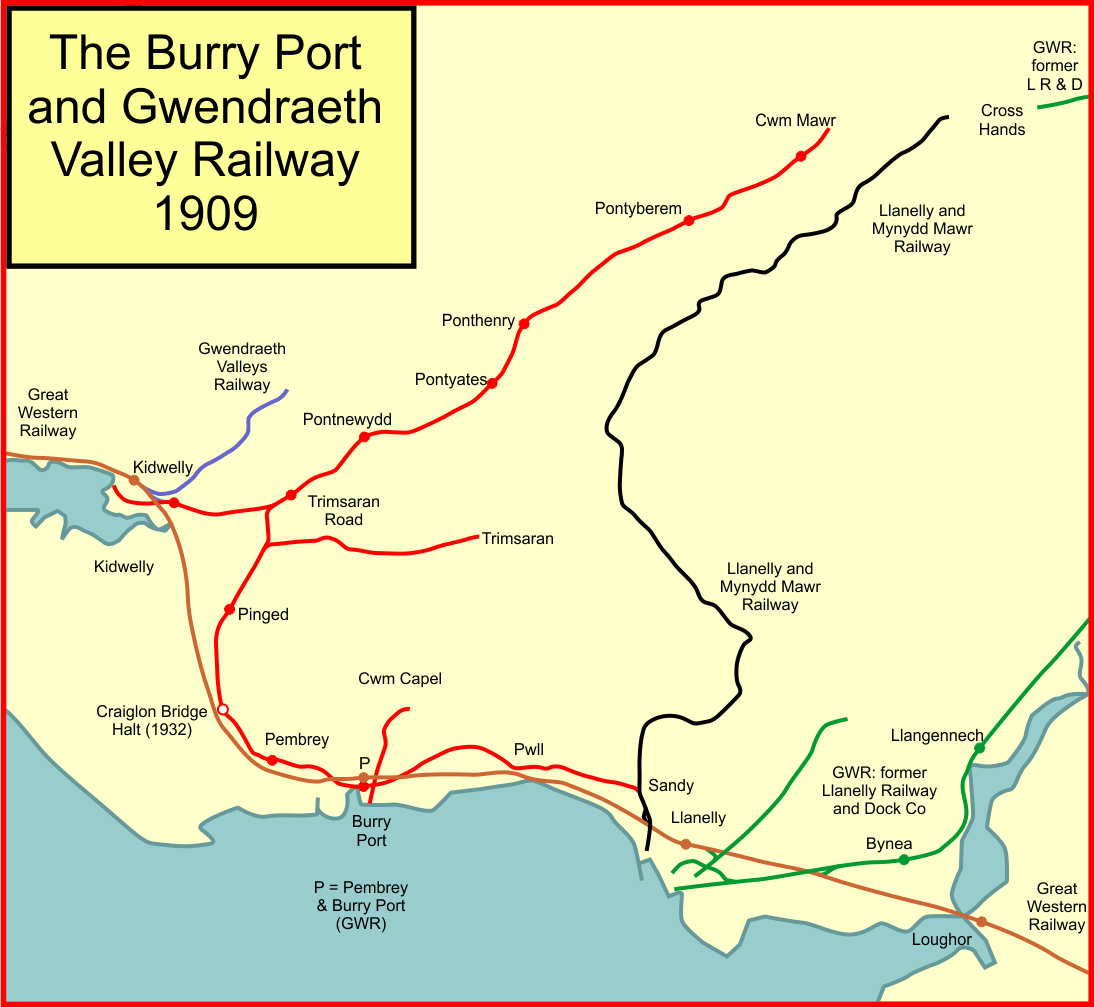
The BP&GVR system in 1909.

== Remnants ==
The section south of Pinged, between Burry Port and Craiglon Bridge Halt is now a footpath and cycleway, however other sections of the line have formal and informal footpaths on the old trackbed. At Pontyberem the station area has been built on and the trackbed is partly footpathed.

== Routes ==
Preceding station	Historical railways	Following station
Ponthenry; Line and station closed	Burry Port and Gwendraeth Valley Railway; Great Western Railway	Cwmmawr; Line and station Closed

== See also ==
- West Wales lines
