= Pontyates railway station =

Former railway station in Wales

Pontyates
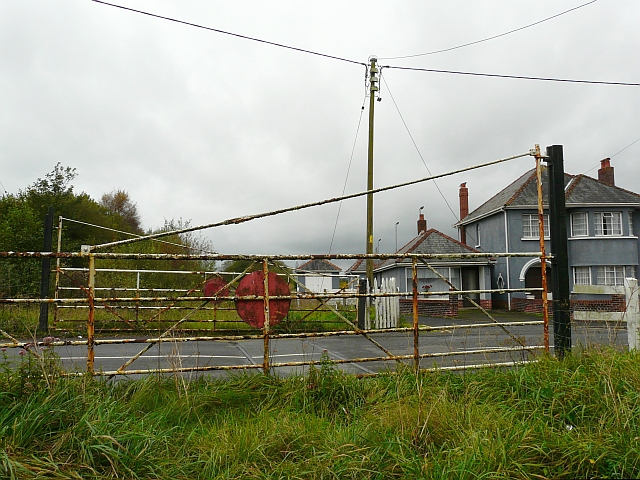
- The old level crossing at Pontyates

General information
- Location: Pontyates, Carmarthenshire; Wales
- Coordinates: 51.7517°N 4.2175°W
- Grid reference: SN470082
- Platforms: 2

Other information
- Status: Disused

History
- Original company: Burry Port and Gwendraeth Valley Railway
- Pre-grouping: Great Western Railway
- Post-grouping: British Transport Commission

Key dates
- 2 August 1909: Station opened
- 21 September 1953: Station closed
Location

Pontyates railway station was opened in 1909 It continued to serve the inhabitants of the Pontyates / Pont-iets area and hinterland between 1909 and 1953; it was one of several stations opened on the Burry Port and Gwendraeth Valley Railway in Carmarthenshire, Wales.

== History ==
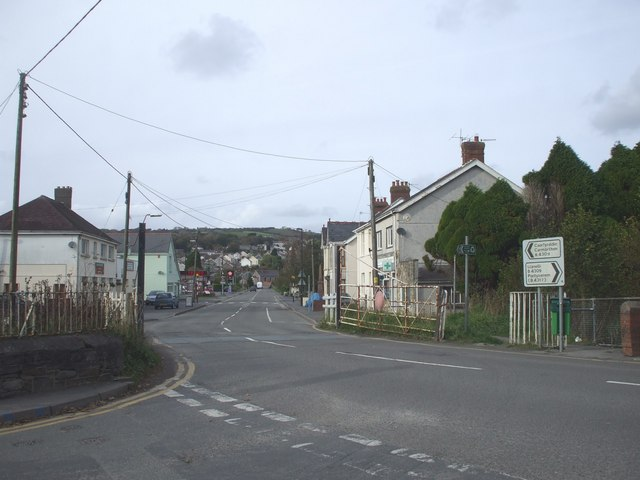
The level crossing site at Pontyates Station.

Pontyates station was opened on 2 August 1909 by the Burry Port and Gwendraeth Valley Railway on the Kidwelly and Cwmmawr section of the line and was closed by the Great Western Railway in 1953 with the last passenger train on the line running on Saturday 19 September 1953. It was on the Burry Port and Gwendraeth Valley Railway with Trimsaran Road located to the south and Ponthenry to the north.

The railway was originally a freight only line, built on the route of the old Kidwelly and Llanelly Canal and prone to flooding, but stations were established due to pressure from the public, Pontyates being a significant size due to the number of collieries in the area. The freight service continued for coal traffic until 1996 by which time the last of the local collieries had closed down. In 2011 a single track line was still is situ and the platform on the eastern side was present but all the station buildings had been demolished. Bridgend and Rhwyth public houses stood nearby.

== Infrastructure ==
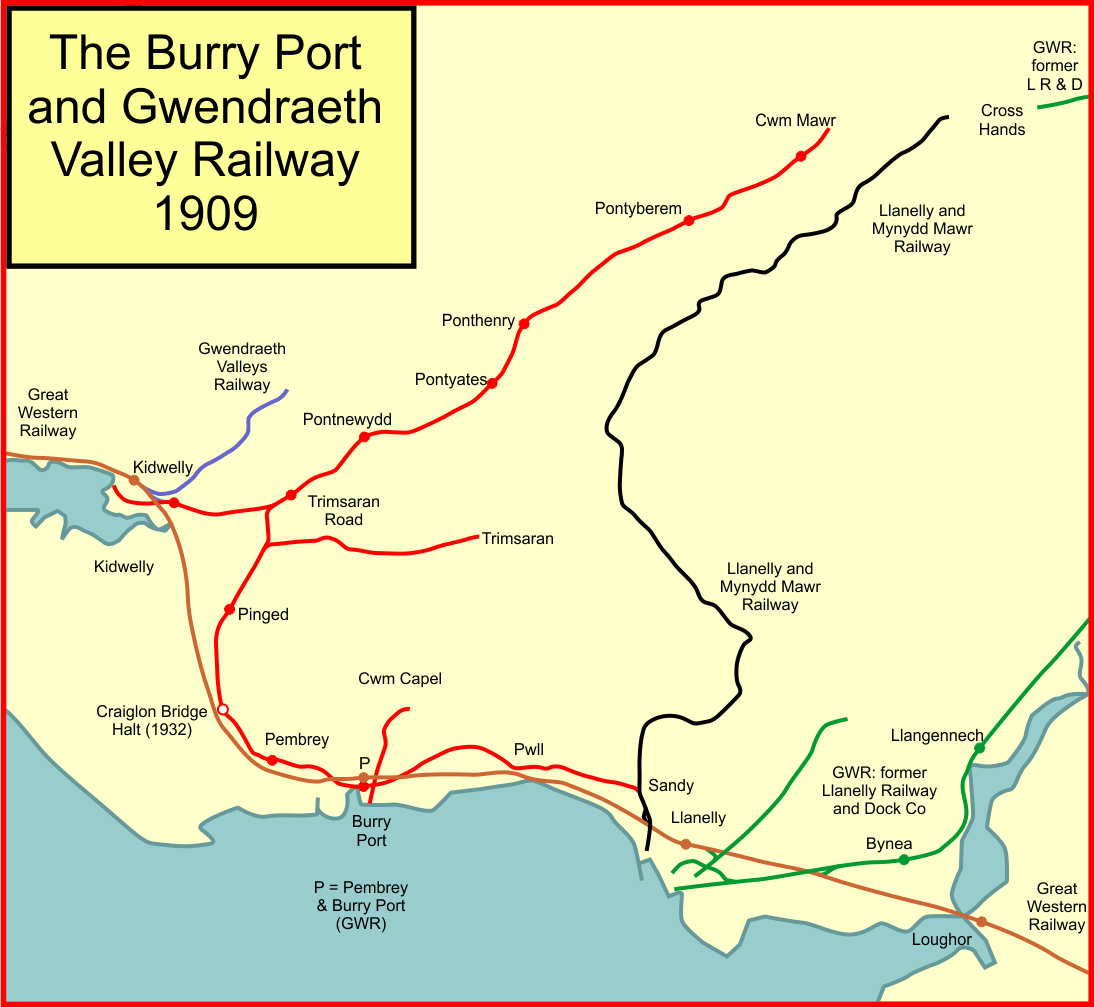
The BP&GVR system in 1909.

The station had two platforms with a signal box on the east side of the passing loop at the southern end of the platform. The main station buildings were built from wood and corrugated iron. and stood on the eastern side of the station and a shelter stood on the western side. Further sidings, a weighing machine, a disused colliery and a passing loop stood to the north past the level crossing. In 1915 Plas-bach Colliery lay to the west with a substantial rail network and several transfer sidings stood on the line towards Pontyates station. What may have been a public siding lay to the west of the station, nearly parallel to the platform.

Caepontbren Colliery was to the north, an anthracite mine operating between 1902–11 and re-opened by the New Caepontbren Colliery Company shortly after and the line running into it from the north, effectively made the aforementioned loop. By 1923 the colliery was disused and the connection was removed. A local builder, E.E.Richards, used sidings to the south until circa 1931.

== Remnants ==
The section south of Pinged, between Burry Port and Craiglon Bridge Halt is now a footpath and cycleway, however other sections of the line have formal and informal footpaths on the old trackbed.

== Routes ==
Preceding station	Historical railways	Following station
Glyn Abbey; Line and station closed	Burry Port and Gwendraeth Valley Railway; Great Western Railway	Ponthenry; Line and station Closed

== See also ==
- West Wales lines
