= Ponthenry railway station =

Former railway station in Wales

Ponthenry

General information
- Location: Llanelli, Carmarthenshire; Wales
- Coordinates: 51.7621°N 4.2084°W
- Grid reference: SN476093
- Platforms: 2

Other information
- Status: Disused

History
- Original company: Burry Port and Gwendraeth Valley Railway
- Pre-grouping: Great Western Railway
- Post-grouping: British Transport Commission

Key dates
- 2 August 1909: Station opened
- 21 September 1953: Station closed
Location

Ponthenry railway station was opened in 1909 It continued to serve the inhabitants of the Pont-henri area and hinterland between 1909 and 1953; it was one of several basic stations opened on the Burry Port and Gwendraeth Valley Railway in Carmarthenshire, Wales.

== History ==
Ponthenry station was opened on 2 August 1909 by the Burry Port and Gwendraeth Valley Railway on the Kidwelly and Cwmmawr section of the line and was closed by the Great Western Railway on Saturday 19 September 1953. It was on the Burry Port and Gwendraeth Valley Railway with Pontyates located to the south and Pontyberem to the north of Kidwelly Junction.

The railway was originally a freight only line, but stations were established due to pressure from the public. The freight service continued for coal traffic until 1996 by which time the last of the local collieries had closed down.

On 3 September 1924 five miners were killed in the Ponthenry Colliery.

== Infrastructure ==
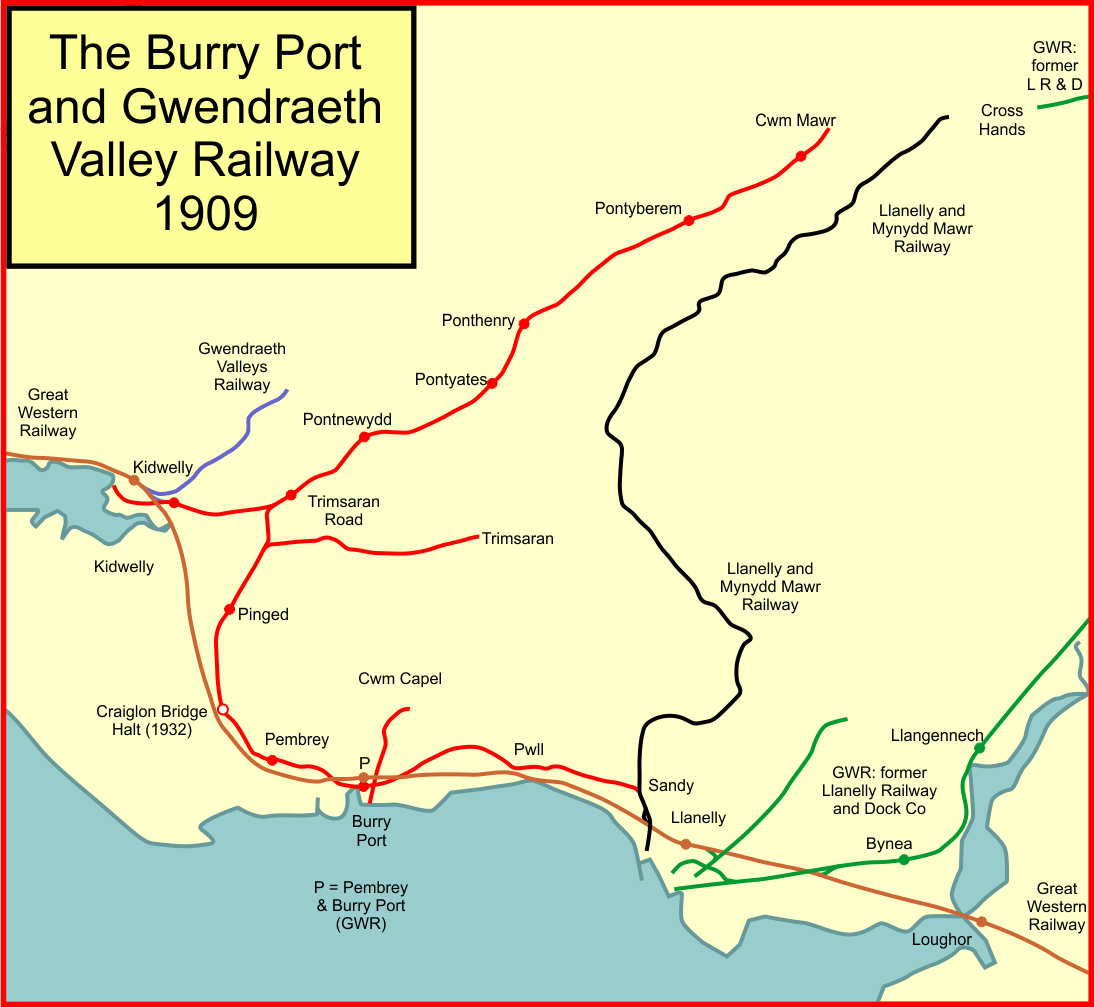
The BP&GVR system in 1909.

In 1913 the station lay on a single track line to the north of the overbridge with a platform to the west and a small waiting room and ticket office. The large Ponthenry Colliery lay to the north with extensive sidings and internal rail network. A single short siding lay to the north on the west side. Later maps and photographs show that the station moved to the south of the overbridge and despite being a single track it had two platforms. The main station building on the western side of the station was built of bricks with a wooden canopy. The platforms were curved and the station stood in a cutting.

The line was partly built on the old Kidwelly and Llanelly Canal however at Ponthenri an incline plane was present as remembered in the name of a local public house, the 'Incline Inn'.

== Remnants ==
The section south of Pinged, between Burry Port and Craiglon Bridge Halt is now a footpath and cycleway, however other sections of the line have formal and informal footpaths on the old trackbed and this is the case at Ponthenry.

== Routes ==
Preceding station	Historical railways	Following station
Pontyates; Line and station closed	Burry Port and Gwendraeth Valley Railway; Great Western Railway	Pontyberem; Line and station Closed

== See also ==
- West Wales lines
