= Glyn Abbey railway station =

Former railway station in Wales

Glyn Abbey
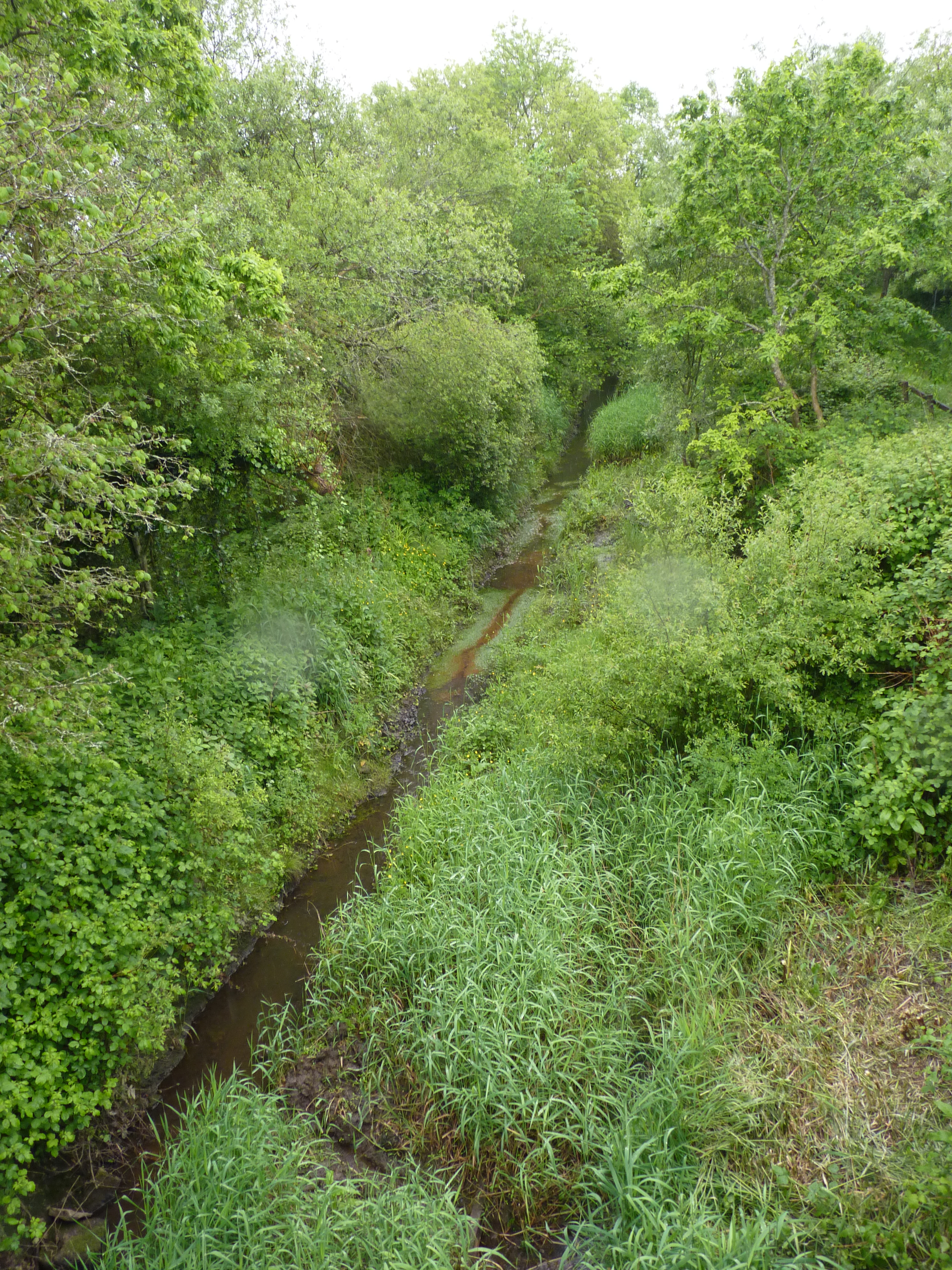
- The trackbed of the old railway and Kymer's Canal.

General information
- Location: Kidwelly, Carmarthenshire; Wales
- Coordinates: 51.7428°N 4.2509°W
- Grid reference: SN446073
- Platforms: 1

Other information
- Status: Disused

History
- Original company: Burry Port and Gwendraeth Valley Railway
- Pre-grouping: Great Western Railway
- Post-grouping: Great Western Railway

Key dates
- 2 August 1909: Station opened
- November 1910: Renamed Glyn Abbey
- 3 May 1943: Station closed
Location

Glyn Abbey railway station was opened in 1909 as Pontnewydd Halt It continued to serve the inhabitants of the Pont-newydd area and hinterland between 1909 and 1943; it was one of several basic halts opened on the Burry Port and Gwendraeth Valley Railway in Carmarthenshire, Wales.

== History ==
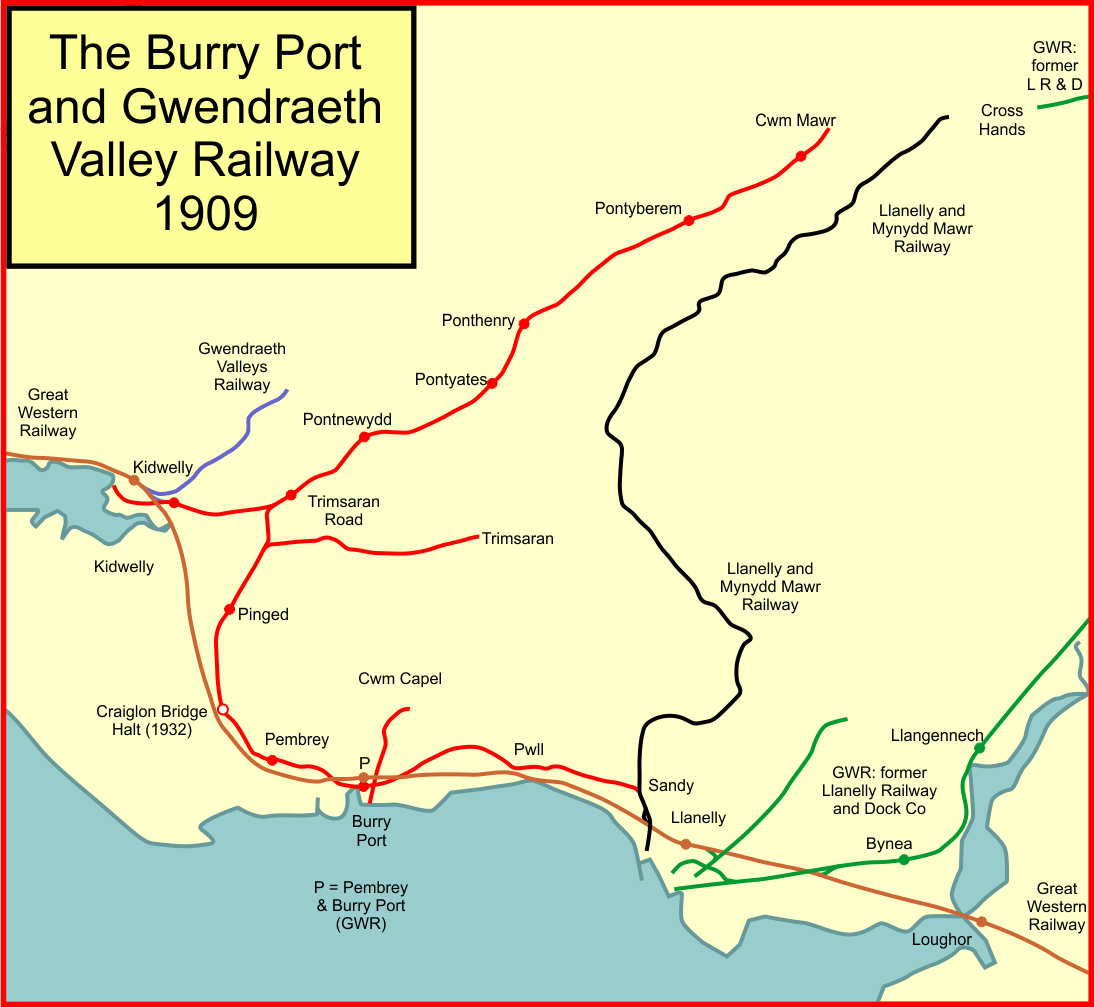
The BP&GVR system in 1909.

The station was opened as Pontnewydd on 2 August 1909 by the Burry Port and Gwendraeth Valley Railway on the Kidwelly and Burry Port section of the line and was closed by the Great Western Railway in 1943 with the last passenger train on the line running nearly ten years later on Saturday 19 September 1953. It was on the Burry Port and Gwendraeth Valley Railway with Trimsaran Road located to the south and Pontyates to the north of the East Kidwelly Junction.

The station was renamed as Glyn Abbey in 1910. The name change may have been to avoid confusion with Upper Pontnewydd at Cwmbran and Lower Pontnewydd at Torfaen. Glyn Abbey was a country house located nearby and linked directly to Pont-newydd by a footpath.

A rural area which once had a public house, the Smiths' Arms, at the nearby Pont-newydd hamlet. The Bryn Forest Inn was also close by on the road to Tre-Goch hamlet. Many old coal pits were once active in the area.

The railway was originally a freight only line, built on the route of an old canal and prone to flooding, but stations were established due to pressure from the public. The freight service continued for coal traffic until 1996 by which time the last of the local collieries had closed down.

== Infrastructure ==
The station had one wooden platform on the western side of this single track line with a small wooden shelter. The station had no public sidings; a road overbridge still stands to the north.

== Remnants ==
The section south of Pinged, between Burry Port and Craiglon Bridge Halt is now a footpath and cycleway, however this section remains abandoned although a footpath has been established in the area.

== Routes ==
Preceding station	Historical railways	Following station
Trimsaran Road; Line and station closed	Burry Port and Gwendraeth Valley Railway; Great Western Railway	Pontyates; Line and station Closed

== See also ==
- West Wales lines
