= Swedish Rheumatism Association =

Swedish non-profit organization

The Swedish Rheumatism Association (Swedish: Reumatikerförbundet) is a non-profit organization working for people with rheumatic disorders. Rheumatism Association funds research in rheumatic diseases through Rheumatism Fund, which collects and administer gifts and donations from mainly private individuals. The Swedish Rheumatism Association has 200 local chapters, serviced by 24 regional branches. Rheumatism world is the association's own magazine in Swedish, published 6 times per year. It provides information about rheumatic diseases, coping strategies, health guides, exercise programs and news about scientific research for members of the association.

== Similar organizations ==
- Versus Arthritis - UK
- Arthritis Foundation - USA
- Arthritis Australia - Australia
- The Arthritis Society - Canada
