= Arthritis Foundation =

American nonprofit organization

- Formation: 1948
- Type: Non-profit organization
- Legal status: Foundation
- Headquarters: Atlanta, Georgia
- Coordinates: 33°47′27.37″N 84°23′17.51″W
- Region served: US
- President & CEO: Steven Taylor
- Chair, Board of Directors: Dennis Ehling
- Main organ: Board of Directors
- Revenue: $76.1 million (2021)
- Expenses: $51.5 million (2021)
- Website: arthritis.org

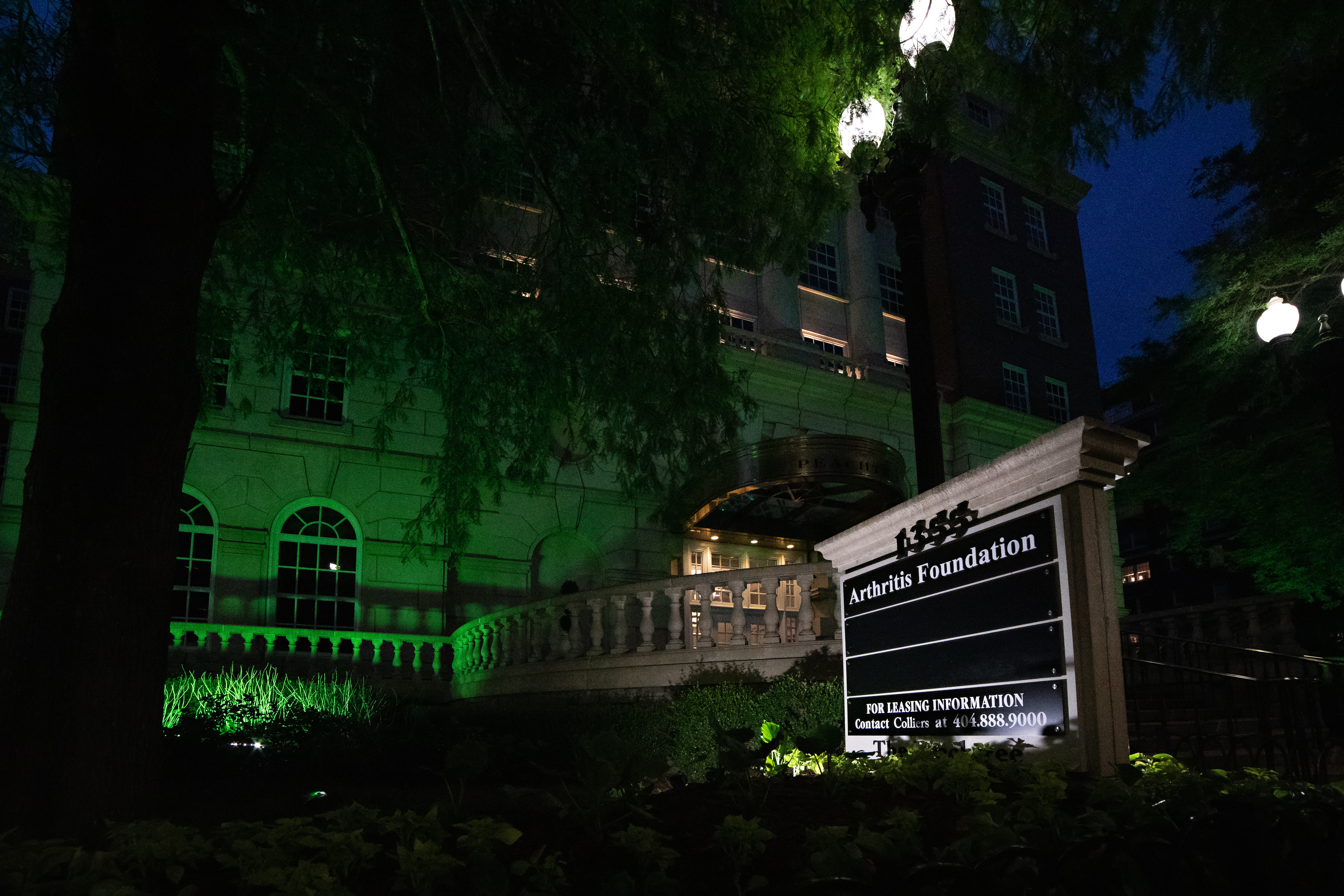
Arthritis Foundation headquarters

The Arthritis Foundation is a nonprofit organization addressing the needs of people living with arthritis in the United States.

The Arthritis Foundation works to provide information and resources, improve access to care, make advancements in scientific research and offer opportunities for community connections. Nationally and through local offices nationwide, the Arthritis Foundation sponsors a variety of year-round events to raise funds and awareness, from local walks and runs to dinners, galas and other fundraisers.

Over the years the Arthritis Foundation has invested over $500 million toward medical research for more effective treatments and ultimately a cure. In addition, the organization advocates for changes to health care policies, legislation and government-funded research to improve the lives of individuals and families affected by arthritis.

The Arthritis Foundation is a major partner of the Childhood Arthritis and Rheumatology Research Alliance (CARRA) to improve health outcomes of children with juvenile arthritis and other pediatric rheumatic diseases. The Foundation has partnered with the Food and Drug Administration (FDA) to accelerate drug development for osteoarthritis, as well as partnered with the National Institutes of Health (NIH) on advancements for other types of arthritis.

== History ==
Founded in 1948 in New York City as the Arthritis and Rheumatism Foundation, the organization's name was changed in 1964 to the Arthritis Foundation. The following year, the American Rheumatism Association (ARA) merged with the Foundation. In 1965, an additional professional society, Allied Health Professions, was established within the Foundation; its name was changed to the Arthritis Health Professions Association (AHPA) in 1980. The American Juvenile Arthritis Organization (AJAO) was established in 1981 as a membership group within the Foundation; in 1991, AJAO became a council of the Foundation. In 1986, the ARA became a separate, independent organization and now is known as the American College of Rheumatology (ACR). In 1994, the AHPA became a division of the ACR and changed its name to the Association of Rheumatology Health Professionals. From the 1950s through the 1970s, the Arthritis Foundation sponsored telethons to raise funds and awareness. These telethons were often headed by actress Jane Wyman, who was personally challenged by rheumatoid arthritis and Type 1 diabetes. Participating celebrities included Betty White, Allen Ludden, Bob Hope, Bing Crosby, Lucille Ball, George Burns, Carol Burnett and many others. An Arthritis Foundation telethon was part of an episode of the Amazon series, The Marvelous Mrs. Maisel. In 2017, the Arthritis Foundation was the benefactor of nearly $1 million in donations and prize money from The New Celebrity Apprentice on NBC, led by actor and former California governor Arnold Schwarzenegger. Comedian and American Ninja Warrior host Matt Iseman was the season's winner, beating musician Boy George in the final competition. Iseman, who has rheumatoid arthritis, has been a longtime supporter of the Arthritis Foundation and gave his winnings to the organization. Originally headquartered in New York City, the Arthritis Foundation has been based in Atlanta, Georgia, since 1978 and has several local offices nationwide.

== Resources ==
The Arthritis Foundation provides information and resources to help people with arthritis manage their condition, including in-person and virtual support groups, some of which focus on specific interests.

Walk With Ease is an Arthritis Foundation educational program that promotes walking and other means of physical activity as part of self management for people with arthritis.

Your Exercise Solution consists of a series of videos users can access to customize personal plans for movement goals, including modifications for specific conditions and limitations.

The Foundation creates webinars, podcasts, and other opportunities to educate people with arthritis and their caregivers on a variety of topics.

The Arthritis Foundation's Ease of Use Certification program recognizes and certifies products and packaging that have been tested and approved as easy to use by anyone with physical limitations.

The Foundation's Arthritis@Work initiative offers turnkey tools and resources to support employees with arthritis in existing corporate wellness programs.

The Arthritis Foundation has over 100,000 advocate volunteer advocates and ambassadors who contribute to forming policies and laws aimed to benefit patients with arthritis and other chronic illnesses. The Foundation has also formed a partnership with the Department of Veterans Affairs to support veterans and retired military personnel with arthritis.

== Access and Advocacy ==
The Arthritis Foundation holds the annual Advocacy Summit, in which arthritis advocates converge in Washington, D.C., to meet with Capitol Hill lawmakers. Participants tell their stories and put a human face on arthritis pain. They continue to urge elected officials to join the Congressional Arthritis Caucus, chaired by Reps. David McKinley (R-WV) and Anna Eshoo (D-CA). The caucus serves as a bipartisan forum to aid senators and representatives in working together to address arthritis.

Tools used by the Foundation for advocacy include state-by-state arthritis prevalence data, regular issue briefs, e-advocacy opportunities, a health care reform Q&A, and sample letters and tips to raise awareness about arthritis.

== Community events and programs ==
Community events and programs run by the Arthritis Foundation help educate the public about the realities of arthritis, raise funds and awareness, and encourage people with arthritis to manage their joint pain and improve overall health. Nationwide activities include Walk to Cure Arthritis, Jingle Bell Run/Walk, the California Coast Classic Bike Tour and other fundraising events. The Arthritis Foundation's Fundraise Your Way program consists of a toolkit and other resources and assistance that give individuals and groups opportunities to create their own fundraisers, which they hold to benefit the organization's efforts. In addition, the Arthritis Foundation hosts dinners, galas and other specialty parties to raise funds for the Foundation's efforts.

The Arthritis Foundation has held its annual educational signature event, the national Juvenile Arthritis (JA) Family Summit (formerly JA Conference), since 1984. Each summer, this four-day conference brings together families from across the country who have a child diagnosed with juvenile idiopathic arthritis (JIA) or related childhood rheumatic condition.

The Arthritis Foundation supports camps for kids and teens with JA to meet others with similar challenges. The Foundation also offers its free JA Power Pack to families of those newly diagnosed with the condition.

== Assets ==
As of 2021 the Arthritis Foundation had total assets of $219,924,122.

=== Funding details ===
Funding details as of 2021:
Revenue and support as of 2021: $76.1 Million
1. Contributions, and grants (78.4%)
2. Program service revenue (4.50%)
3. Investment income (5.70%)
4. Other revenue (11.4%)
Expenses as of 2021: $51.5
1. Grants (13.4%)
2. Salaries, other compensation = (44.3%)
3. Other expenses (42.3%)

== Partnerships ==
The Arthritis Foundation receives funding from its corporate partners, including AbbVie, Alpha Omicron Pi, American Orthopaedic Foot and Ankle Society, American Physical Therapy Association, Amgen, Boehringer Ingelheim, Bristol Myers Squibb, Eli Lilly and Company, Genentech, Janssen, Novartis, Organon, Pfizer, Tylenol and UCB.

== Ease of Use Certification ==
The Arthritis Foundation's Ease of Use Certification program recognizes products proven to make life easier for people who have arthritis and other physical limitations. The Ease of Use certification seal identifies products that have been tested and evaluated by experts and people with arthritis. Companies that have had products accredited with the Ease of Use certification include Melnor, Advil, Flexon, IMAK, Duracell and Acorn Stairlifts.

== Similar organizations ==
- Arthritis Australia – Australia
- Versus Arthritis – UK
- The Swedish Rheumatism Association – Sweden
