= Pontyates =

Village in Carmarthenshire, Wales

Coordinates: 51.752°N 4.217°W

Pontyates: Welsh: Pont-iets
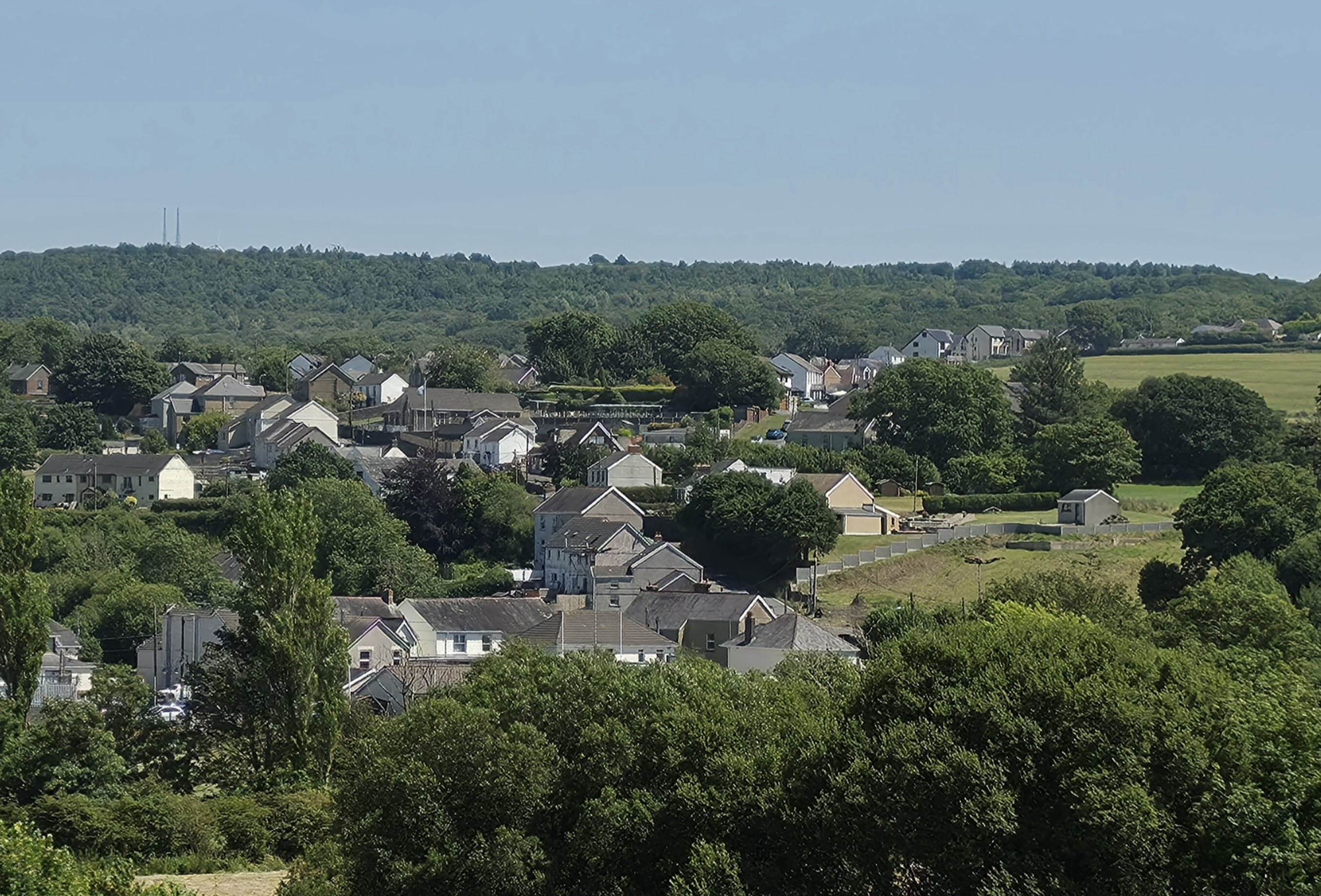

- Location within Carmarthenshire
- Population: 1,475
- OS grid reference: SN470085
- Community: Llanelli Rural; Llangyndeyrn
- Principal area: Carmarthenshire
- Preserved county: Dyfed
- Country: Wales
- Sovereign state: United Kingdom
- Post town: Llanelli
- Postcode district: SA15
- Dialling code: 01269
- Police: Dyfed-Powys
- Fire: Mid and West Wales
- Ambulance: Welsh
- UK Parliament: Llanelli
- Senedd Cymru – Welsh Parliament: Sir Gaerfyrddin

Pontyates (Welsh: Pont-iets) is a village straddling two communities, situated in the Gwendraeth Valley half way between Carmarthen and Llanelli in Carmarthenshire, West Wales.

== History ==
Pontyates was formerly a mining village, with several anthracite collieries operating from the 17th century onwards. The industry was at its peak during the 19th century and mining activity ceased in the late 1920s.

The mine workings included the Caepontbren, Plasbach and Gwendraeth collieries.

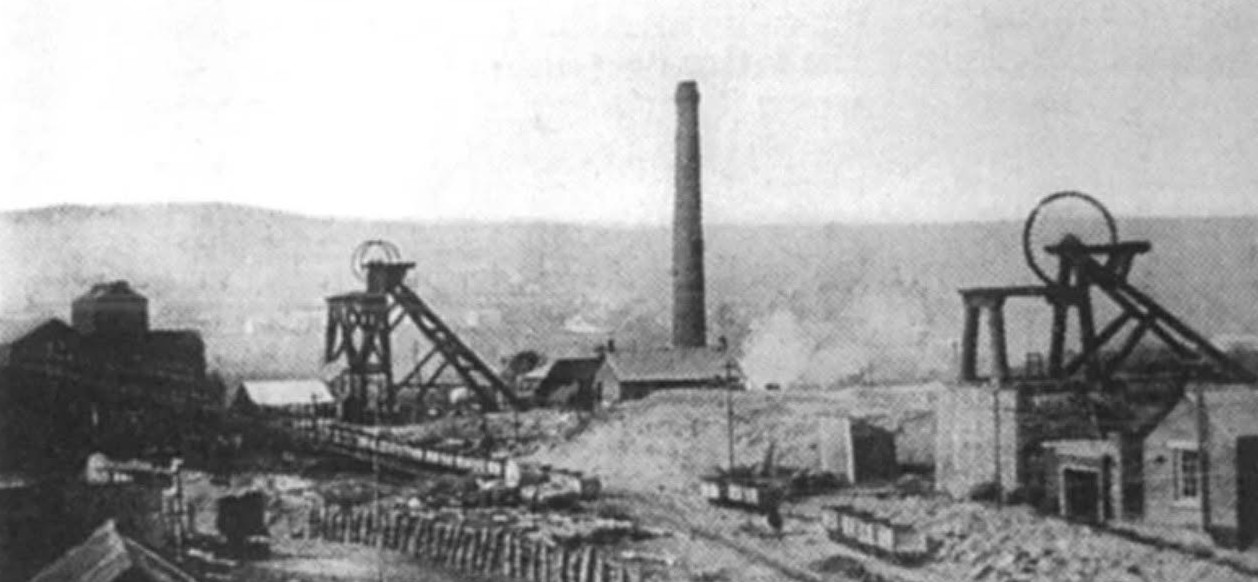
A late Victorian era photograph of Plasbach Colliery, Pontyates.

Coal was originally transported to ports via Thomas Kymer's canal, which was constructed between 1766 and 1768 before being extended to Pontyates in 1824.

From 1866, transportation by canal was replaced by a railway and from 1909, Pontyates had its own railway station, run by the Burry Port and Gwendraeth Valley Railway company. Pontyates was one of the stations that lay between Llanelli and the Cwmmawr terminus.

The fact that the line was built along the old canal route meant that it was prone to flooding. The station at Pontyates was eventually closed in 1953. Despite being no longer in use, the railway line still crosses the road running through the village and can be walked across as part of the Pontyates Mining Heritage Walk.

After the Plasbach and Gwendraeth mines closed in 1928, men from Pontyates found work at other pits in the area, in particular the Carway Fawr, Ponthenri and Pentremawr collieries.

In later years, from 1954 until its closure in 1989, the nearby Cynheidre Colliery continued to provide the village with employment in the coal industry.

== Geography ==
Pontyates is situated on the banks of the Gwendraeth Fawr river, on largely hilly terrain. It sits along the B4309 that runs between the towns of Carmarthen and Llanelli, which are both just under 10 miles from the village. Pontyates is primarily Welsh-speaking. The village is set in a wooded, rural area with impressive views of the surrounding countryside.

Mainly linear, Pontyates is built upon the two sides of the valley. The Carmarthen and Llanelli sides are known locally as 'Pentre Hyn' (this village) and 'Pentre Draw' (that village), depending on where the speaker stands.

The low lying land of the valley bottom is referred to locally as 'Y Sarn'. Due to regular flooding by the Gwendraeth Fawr, the soil here is alluvial. An important wetland habitat is also provided by the rush pasture, the river and the remnants of the canal, which are havens for wildlife. The wider landscape includes wet meadows that are designated Sites of Special Scientific Interest, due to the diverse flora and fauna.

== Toponymy ==
The village of Pontyates was originally known as Tregwiail.

Pontyates featured on the BBC Wales programme What's in a name in 2007.

'Pont' is the Welsh word for bridge and it is understood that 'Yates' is the name of a family that lived in the area. The literal meaning of the name is therefore 'Yates' Bridge'.

A Walter Yates is documented as residing in the Llangyndeyrn parish in 1642 and 1665. The surname is also found in records as part of the names of the properties 'Tŷ-iets' in 1739, 'Tir Yates' and 'Ynys Yates' in 1790. The name 'Pont Yates' first appears in Emmanuel Bowen's 1760 map of South Wales.

Local tradition has long associated the name with the dialect word 'iet' (meaning gate), which is interpreted as referring to a tollgate. This has influenced the Welsh spelling and pronunciation of the name.

The People's Collection publication Turnpike Roads of South-West Wales, Milestones, Toll Gates and Lost Infrastructure 1700–1844 confirms that there was indeed a tollgate in Pontyates (PRN 107951), which collected tolls along the Carmarthen to Llanelli turnpike road.

Another local understanding of the origin of the village's name is that 'iet' refers to the village being a gateway to the Gwendraeth Valley/Cwm Gwendraeth from the nearby coast.

== Culture and community ==
Pontyates Welfare Hall, built in 1938, is the cultural and community hub of the village. The Hall provides a venue for numerous organisations and events, as well as hosting a regular local produce market. A public library is located within the Hall. An annual music and community event is also held in the village, Parti Pont-iets or Party on the Pitch.

Pontyates has two Welsh medium primary schools, Ysgol Gynradd Pontiets and Ysgol Gynradd Gwynfryn.

Meddygfa'r Sarn (Sarn Surgery) provides the community with healthcare, clinics and other wellbeing services.

Pontyates also has a Fire and Rescue station.

== Sport ==
The village is home to Pontyates Rugby Football Club, which was founded in 1966. The senior team plays in Division Four West B of the Welsh Rugby Union Men's National League.

== Notable people ==
- Mandy Rice-Davies, notable for her role in the Profumo affair.
- June Brown, famous for her role as Dot Cotton in BBC's EastEnders, was evacuated to Pontyates during the Second World War and mentioned the village in one episode of the soap opera.
- Cyril Glyndwr Williams, a leading academic and an authority on world religions.
