= Martyn Williams (broadcaster) =

Welsh broadcaster and author

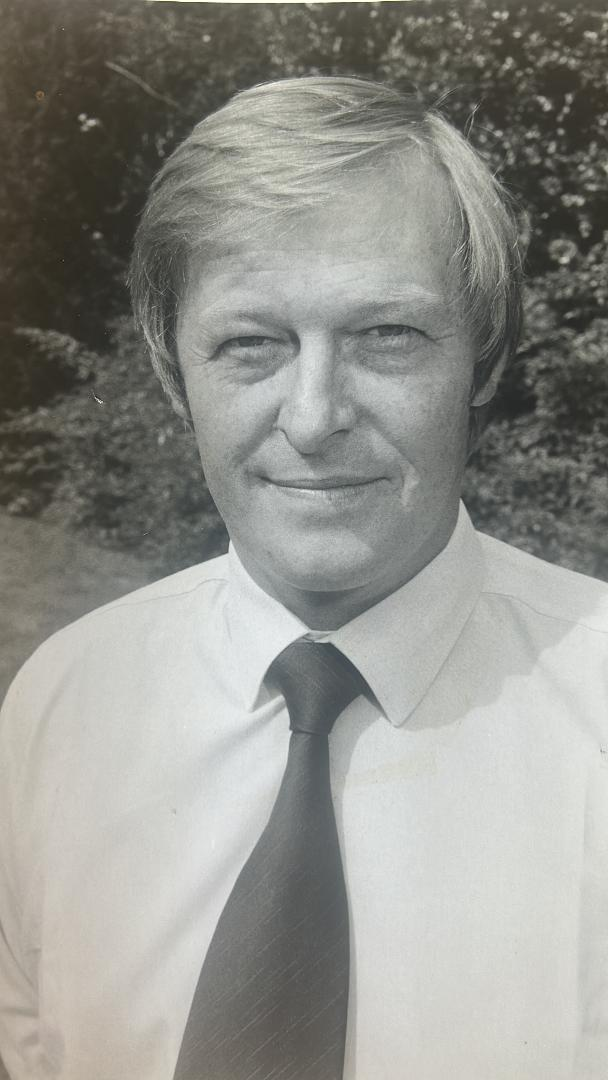
- Williams in about 1980
- Born: Martyn Huw Williams; 1947 (age 78–79); Bancffosfelen, Wales
- Education: Cathays High School, Cardiff; Atlantic College, Wales
- Alma mater: Trinity College (Connecticut)
- Occupations: Journalist, sports commentator, presenter, author
- Years active: 1972-2012
- Employer(s): BBC Radio, BBC Television, ITV Wales, S4C, The Guardian
- Notable credit(s): Rugby Special, Wales Today
- Children: 5
- Relatives: Cyril G. Williams (father)

Martyn Huw Williams (born 1947) is a journalist, author, sports commentator, radio broadcaster, television presenter, television and radio producer. Born in Wales, he has worked in the communications and public relations industries. He has consulted for several institutions and charities, and interviewed numerous public figures and sportspeople as a broadcaster.

== Early life ==
Martyn Williams was born in Bancffosfelen in Pontyberem community, Carmarthenshire, to the Reverend Cyril G. Williams and Irene (née Daniels). The family moved to Acton, London when Williams was aged 3 where his father was minister at Radnor Walk Congregationalist Church, Chelsea.

Returning to Cardiff, Williams attended Cathays High School then won a scholarship to Atlantic College, based at St Donat’s Castle in south Wales. He won the John Strawbridge Scholarship to attend Trinity College (Connecticut), graduating with a BA degree in English. Whilst at Hartford Williams founded the school’s rugby team, which is still playing today, and sang with a folk group “The Trinidads Of Trinity College” who recorded an LP, including Williams singing Danny Boy in Welsh.

== Broadcasting career ==
Williams joined Harlech Television as a news reporter and presenter including presenting the Welsh League Of Youth Eisteddfod (Urdd National Eisteddfod) in 1972 and the nightly news programme Report Wales, then briefly joining Swansea Sound as a news editor in 1974 before moving to the radio news department at BBC Wales.

Attracting the highest broadcasting figures for a local radio network, Williams introduced the weekly nightly programme “4,5,6” for two hours of news and sport between 1984 and 1986. Williams also worked as a television journalist for BBC Wales on the current affairs strand Wales Today including a special item on Llywelyn The Great on 22 May 1978.

In addition to his work as a journalist he covered the National Eisteddfod, including the Chairing of the Bard in 1988, and presented light entertainment programmes such as the series Celtic Road and documentary programmes such as Secret Of The Machines about Ray Prosser and Pontypool RFC and Atlantic College, a Delta 4 Production for BBC Wales, where he returned to his former college to look back at the history of its 25 years. In Welsh for S4C he presented documentary programmes on the Ice Age and the Druids - Dyddiau Dyn: Oes Yr Ia and Dyddiau Dyn: Derwyddon and wrote his own comedy programme Theatr Ysgafn Yn Cyflwyno: Bois Y Bledren about the trials and tribulations of a rugby club and its committee, and Dwylo Dros Y Mor (about Atlantic College).

=== Sports broadcasting ===
In the 1980s Williams started commentating on sports events such as athletics and rugby for radio, including internationals. Moving to television he covered club and international rugby matches for BBC Network, where he worked on the BBC series Grandstand & Rugby Special, and BBC Wales where he worked on the weekly rugby programmes Weekend Rugby Union, Rugby Special Wales and Sportfolio, most frequently with Phil Bennett as the second voice. He commentated on the 1987 Rugby World Cup for the BBC and the 1991 Rugby World Cup for Sianel Pedwar Cymru (S4C) with Gareth Edwards.

=== Radio ===
As well as his television work he made several radio programmes. In 1982 he made a series of programmes for Radio Wales where he was in conversation with famous Welsh sporting personalities including Jack Petersen, Wilf Wooller, Sir Harry Llewellyn, Eddie Thomas, Vivian Jenkins, Trevor Ford, and Haydn Tanner. In 1984 he made a series Now There’s A Player for BBC Radio Wales which consisted of a series of interviews with famous Welsh personalities - Claude Davey, Ivor Allchurch, Dai Dower, Don Shepherd, David Broome and Brian Huggett. In 1985 he made a series “Headlines Deadlines” for BBC Radio Wales/Radio 4, where he interviewed newspaper journalists including Lord Hugh Cudlipp, Alan Watkins (Observer), David Nicholas (ITV), Angus McDermid (BBC) and Peter Corrigan (Observer). In 1987 he made Curtain Call for BBC Radio Wales/Radio 4 where he interviewed actors including Siân Phillips, Emrys James, Ray Smith, Glyn Houston, Anthony Hopkins and Hywel Bennett.

In addition to these series he made programmes for Radio 4 - On The Town, Victorious Lions and Welsh Arts Week, and continued to make one-off programmes for Radio Wales A Plague On Anglo Saxons (on the National Eisteddfod), Atlantic Ideal, Crown, Chair & Cob (a review of the 1987 National Eisteddfod), and On The Town: Portrait Of A City: Cardiff.

=== Freelance ===
In 1989 Williams joined freelance production company Delta 4/Delta Cyf. and co-founded the production facilities company Derwen, situated in Plas Dinefwr, Llandeilo, West Wales. Together with his partner, Lesley, he started a freelance production company Rugby Vision which produced all genre television programmes.

Programmes included Cymro Cryfa (Strongest Man) for S4C from 1991 to 1995 which took place at the Royal Welsh Show, Yr Arwr a’i Faes for S4C featuring Gareth Edwards, Gareth Davies, Barry John, Elgan Rees, Ray Gravell, Hugo Porta, Jonathan Davies, Clive Rowlands and His Game His Stadium for BBC Wales with Mike Burton, Graham Mourie, Fergus Slattery, Mark Ella, Andy Irvine, Hugo Porta, Jean-Pierre Rives and Phil Bennett.

Rugby Vision also produced three programmes for the BBC Fighting Class series - Peerless Jim: Jim Driscoll, Tylerstown Terror: Jimmy Wilde, and Welsh Wizard: Freddie Welsh. Programmes of different genres were produced for S4C by Rugby Vision, amongst which was Cracabant, a morning children’s series and as production company Cyffro programmes for S4C included, amongst others, a series of eight programmes on a day in the life of a vet Galw’r Fet and Cwist, a sports quiz.

Coverage of two Welsh Rugby Tours were produced by Rugby Vision/Delta. The Wales B tour of Canada 1987 was produced for S4C Rygbi: Cymru Yng Nghanada: Taith Cymru B, for which Williams provided the commentary, and HTV and the 1990 tour of Namibia was produced for S4C & HTV, the first rugby tour to that country. To coincide with the opening of the new Millennium Stadium in Cardiff, Rugby Vision were commissioned by S4C to produce three programmes: the first was on the International Rugby Board (IRB) chairman, Vernon Pugh; the second Ymlaen I Gymru charted the World Cup’s journey to Wales and the third Symyd Y Pyst followed the story of the demolition and re-building of the Millennium Stadium.

Rugby Vision produced two videos on Llanelli RFC for BBC Wales: Llanelli RFC: The Official History, narrated by Phil Bennett and Scarlet Fever: A Triple Dose 1992-93.

==== Welsh Rugby Union ====
Williams worked with the Welsh Rugby Union to introduce Dragon Rugby into Wales producing two training videos for the WRU, Dragon Rugby: A Game For Everyone and Capture the Magic, a monthly magazine, Dragon Rugby and the Christmas Dragon Rugby Annual which was endorsed by the late Diana, Princess of Wales. Scott Gibbs, a former Welsh Rugby international, joined Rugby Vision to work on the Cymro Cryfa series in 1991 and Dragon Rugby project.

==== Other commentating ====
Williams continued to commentate on various events for S4C including golf: Golff: Pencampwriaeth Agored Portwgal 1987 (Portuguese Open Golf), Golff: Pencampwriaeth Agored Prydeinig yn Turnberry 1988 (Senior British Open Championship) and rugby - Rygbi: America v Cymru in 1997, and Hen Stagers 1991 (Annual Rugby Union Reunion In Bermuda).

== Journalism ==
Williams reported on rugby for over 30 years contributing to newspapers such as The Independent, The Sunday Telegraph, but mostly for The Guardian in the 1980s and 1990s.

== Published works ==
Williams has written or edited several books on Welsh sports:

- Everywhere For Wales: Phil Bennett. Stanley Paul, Harper Collins. 1981. ISBN 0091463106.
- Kicked Into Touch: Paul Thorburn. Stanley Paul. 1992. ISBN 9780091749675.
- Williams, Martyn (2012). Shadow: Dai Morris. Y Lolfa. ISBN 978-1847714862.
- Williams, Martyn (2010). El Bandito: Orig Williams. Y Lolfa. ISBN 978-1847712929.
- Wales International Rugby Records. Y Lolfa.

He also wrote tourism brochures for the Isle of Anglesey council in 2013 and 2014

== Consultancy ==
Williams was media facilities consultant for the Millennium Stadium, working to the Chairman of the IRB, Vernon Pugh.

He was media facilities consultant and spokesman to Ffos Las Racecourse.

Founder of the Welsh Equine Council and, as Chairman, organised the Inaugural Welsh Festival of the Horse, Margam Park, in 2006.

Producer, Promoter of the 2003 USA tour of the Dylan Thomas Dylan, The Return Journey, featuring Bob Kingdom, developed by Kingdom and Anthony Hopkins, the show’s original director, timed to commemorate the 50th anniversary of the death of Thomas in New York.

== Voluntary ==
Williams was chair of the Llandaff Fields Community and Sports Trust Development from August 2011 to July 2014. The Trust, in conjunction with Cardiff City Council, hoped to upgrade the facilities and fields for a number of sports clubs and organisations.

He was one of the founders and became the first secretary of Clwb Rygbi Cymry Caerdydd, established in 1967, a largely Welsh speaking rugby team in Cardiff which, as of 2025, plays in the East Central League 3 of the Welsh Championship. His sons, grandsons and grand-daughters have played for the club and his son, Gareth, became senior coach.

In 1998 the National Trust were tasked with raising money to buy Snowdon (Yr Wyddfa) and Williams conceived the idea of a National Run for Snowdon. Enlisting the help of Welsh marathon runner Steve Brace and the students at University Of Wales Institute - UWIC (now Cardiff Metropolitan University), teams of runners started in Pontypool and traversed the entire country raising awareness and funds of the National Trust campaign. Informally the Run for Snowdon was said to have raised £400,000 towards the successful purchase of Snowdon.

== See also ==
- Rugby Union in Wales
