= Sarah Hewlett =

British nursing professor

Sarah Hewlett OBE
- Born: Sarah Elizabeth Hewlett
- Education: St Bartholomew's Hospital; University of Bristol
- Known for: Rheumatoid arthritis
- Awards: Fellow of the Royal College of Nursing
- Scientific career
- Workplaces: University of the West of England; University of Bristol
- Thesis: Values, disability and personal impact in rheumatoid arthritis (2000)
- Website: people.uwe.ac.uk/Person/SarahHewlett

Sarah Elizabeth Hewlett OBE is an emeritus Professor of Rheumatology Nursing at the University of the West of England and expert on rheumatoid arthritis (RA). She was appointed an Officer of the Order of the British Empire in the 2019 Birthday Honours.

== Early life and education ==
Hewlett studied nursing at St Bartholomew's Hospital and graduated in 1975. She spent five years as a senior sister in a neurosurgical unit before becoming a clinical researcher. She was supported by the Arthritis Research Campaign (now Versus Arthritis). She studied health care ethics at the University of Wales, investigating the ethics of informed consent. She earned a PhD at the University of Bristol in 2000, where she studied the impact of disability in rheumatoid arthritis.

== Research and career ==
Hewlett spent the early part of her nursing career in clinical care. She then moved into research, where worked on rheumatology care, education and research. She collaborated with the University Hospitals Bristol NHS Foundation Trust. Hewlett identified that patients suffering from rheumatoid arthritis (RA) consider fatigue as a significant and often overlooked problem. She estimated that up to 98% of people who suffer from RA experience fatigue. She noticed that whilst fatigue makes the symptoms worse for patients with multiple sclerosis, rheumatoid arthritis makes fatigue worse. She described flares of rheumatoid arthritis as "duvet and chocolate days". Hewlett evaluated the provisions nurses had for treating fatigue, and found that they had limited ways to measure and manage fatigue. Hewlett went on to develop a protocol to evaluate fatigue. She then ensured that it was evaluated in every rheumatoid arthritis trial. In 2007 she was the first person to be named a Chair in Rheumatology Nursing at the University of the West of England.

The protocol developed by Hewlett, the Bristol RA Fatigue Scales (BRAFs), can be used to evaluate the severity of disease, and have been translated into 36 languages. Once she had developed a metric to measure fatigue, Hewlett developed interventions to manage fatigue, including the use of cognitive behavioural therapy (CBT). Her research into the design and testing of CBT interventions was supported by the National Institute for Health Research. CBT was shown to reduce the impact and severity of fatigue in patients with RA, and adopted by occupational therapists in Scotland and British Columbia.

Hewlett contributed to the Oxford Textbook of Rheumatology.

=== Awards and honours ===
Her awards and honours include:

- 2011 Fellow of the Royal College of Nursing
- 2019 Officer of the Order of the British Empire
