= Arthur Bowen =

Arthur Bowen may refer to:

- Arthur "Waring" Bowen (1922–1980), English solicitor who founded the charity British Rheumatism & Arthritis Association
- Arthur Bowen (actor) (born 1998), English actor
