= Burry Port railway station =

Former railway station in Burry Port

Burry Port

General information
- Location: Burry Port, Carmarthenshire; Wales
- Coordinates: 51.6835°N 4.2500°W
- Grid reference: SN445007
- Platforms: 1

Other information
- Status: Disused

History
- Original company: Burry Port and Gwendraeth Valley Railway
- Pre-grouping: Great Western Railway
- Post-grouping: Great Western Railway

Key dates
- 2 August 1909: Station opened
- 1 July 1924: Renamed Pembrey
- 21 September 1953: Station closed
Location

Burry Port railway station served the town of Burry Port (Welsh: Porth Tywyn). It continued to serve the inhabitants of the area near Llanelli between 1909 and 1953 and was one of several basic halts opened on the Burry Port and Gwendraeth Valley Railway in Carmarthenshire, Wales (Welsh: Cymru).

== History ==
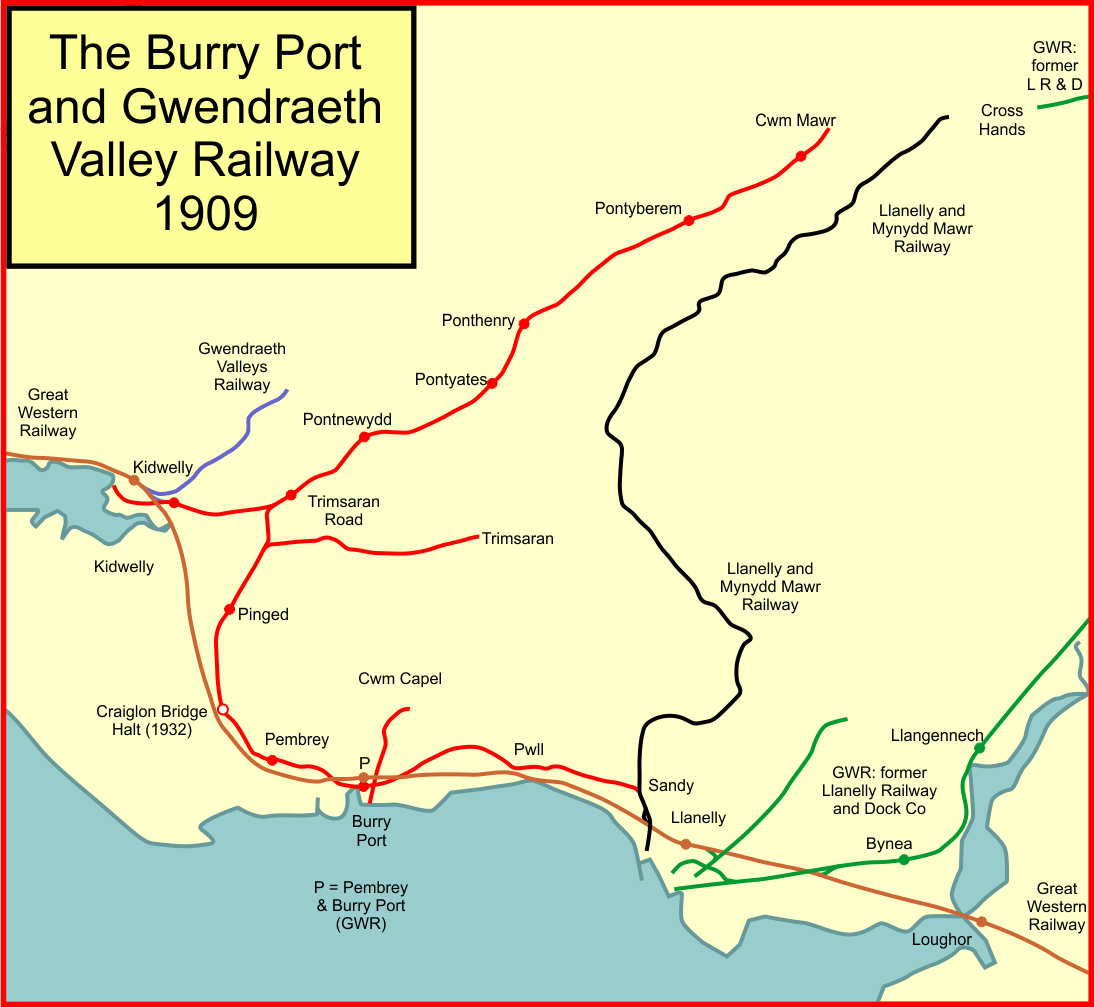
The BP&GVR system in 1909.

The station was opened as Burry Port in 1898 but regular passenger services began on 2 August 1909 by the Burry Port and Gwendraeth Valley Railway on the Kidwelly and Burry Port section of the line and was closed by the British Transport Commission in 1953 with the last passenger train running on Saturday 19 September 1953. It was on the southern section of the Burry Port and Gwendraeth Valley Railway with Pembrey to the north and Burry Port as the terminus of the passenger line.

The line had been built on the course of an old canal with resulting tight curves, low bridge clearance and a tendency to flooding. The freight service continued for coal traffic on the Cwmmawr branch to Kidwelly until 1996 by which time the last of the local collieries had closed down and the washery closure followed.

Pembrey and Burry Port on the West wales line lies to the east.

== Infrastructure ==
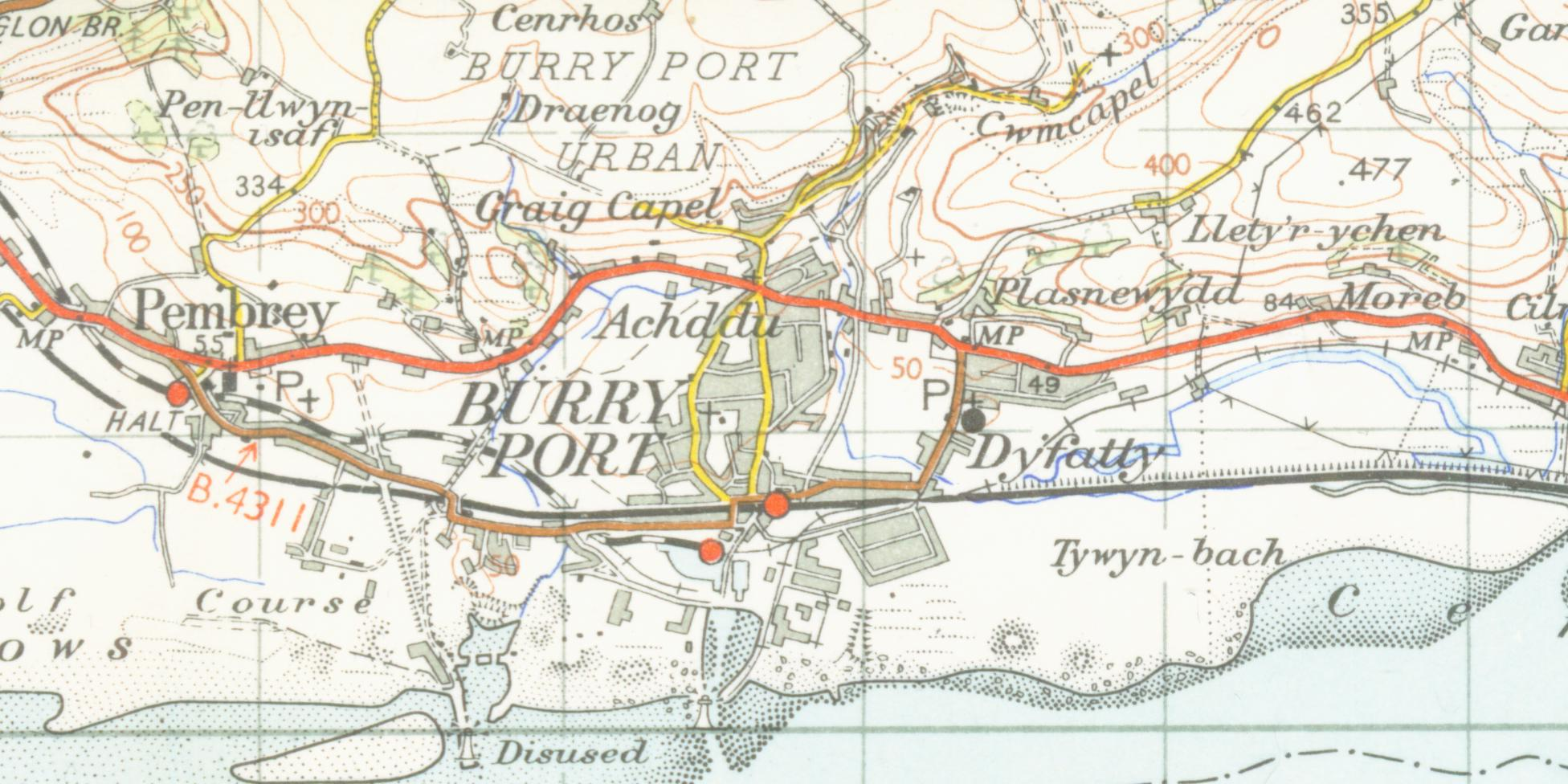
1954 OS map of Burry Port and Pembrey.

The station had a single short platform, a brick built toilet block and a substantial corrugated iron ticket office and waiting room with a canopy on the northern side of the single line. The station had a run round passing loop and two carriage sidings, one of which also served a goods shed. Signalling was present.

The Kidwelly route was used for coal trains, resulting in the lifting of track between Trimsaran Road and Burry Port by 2005.

Burry Port railway station on the West Wales line stood close to the site of the old Burry Port and Gwendraeth Valley Railway.

== Services ==
The station was open for use by the general public by 1909.

== Remnants ==
The section of the old line between Burry Port and Craiglon Bridge Halt is now a footpath and the NCN 4 cyclepath. The station site is now part of a roundabout.

== Routes ==
Preceding station	Historical railways	Following station
Pembrey; Line and station closed	Burry Port and Gwendraeth Valley Railway; Great Western Railway	Terminus; Line and station Closed

== See also ==
- West Wales lines
