= Ieuan Rees =

Welsh stone cutter (1941–2025)

- Born: 1941; Ammanford, Carmarthenshire, Wales
- Died: 2025 (aged 83–84)
- Education: Royal College of Art
- Occupation: Stone cutter

Ieuan (pronounced "YAY-an" ) Rees (1941 – 2025) was a veteran stone cutter, calligrapher, artist, teacher and YouTube personality from Ammanford, Wales.

== Education and early life ==
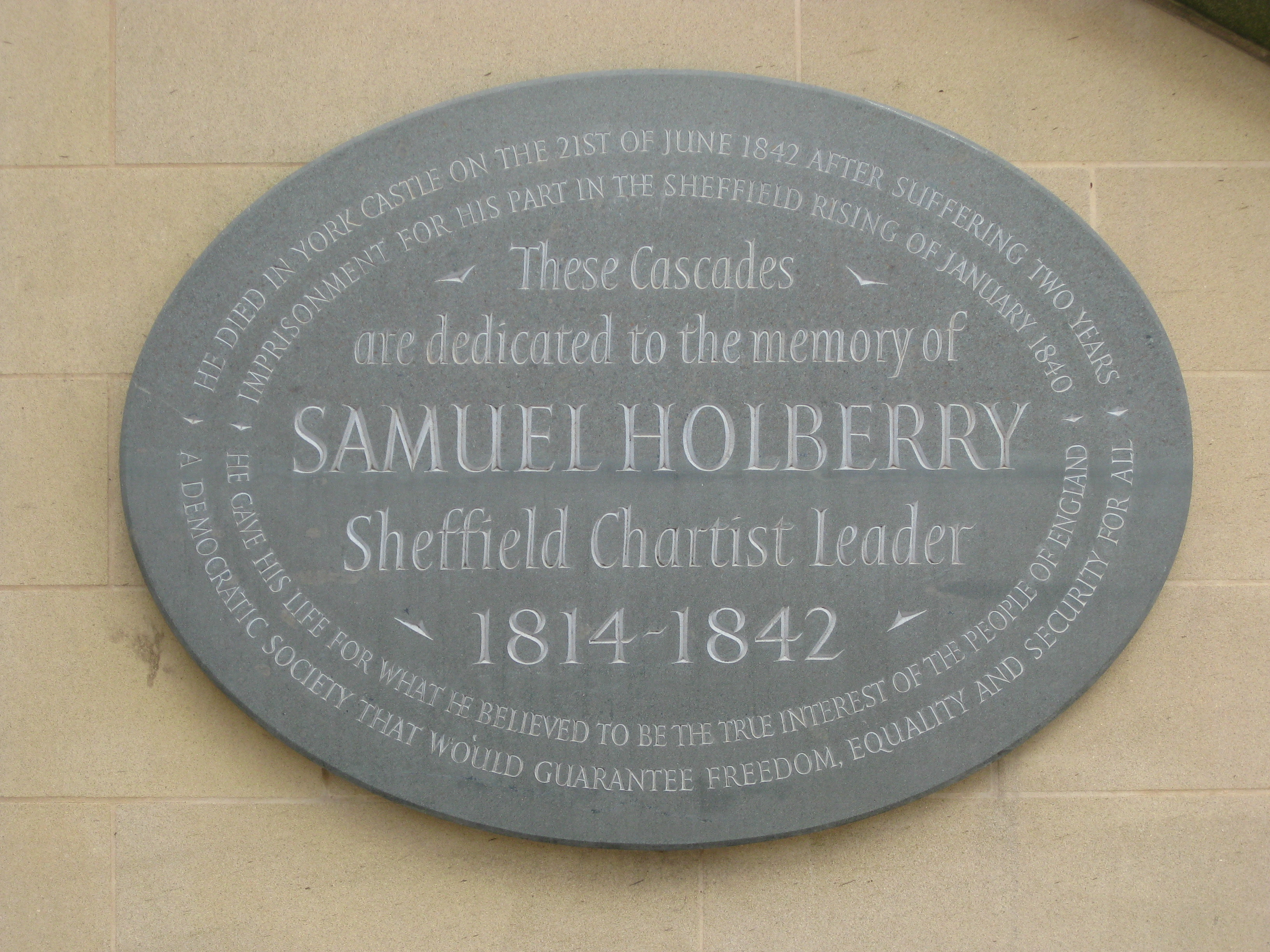
Plaque commemorating Samuel Holberry, Peace Gardens, Sheffield

Rees was born in 1941 in Pontyberem, and grew up in Tumble, Carmarthenshire. He was encouraged by an uncle, Hywel Harries, who was an artist and cartoonist. Rees studied at Carmarthen Art School, and then at the Royal College of Art in London. In the 1960s and 70s, Rees taught lettering and calligraphy part-time at Camberwell School of Art. He then returned to Wales, and taught at Swansea College of Art and Dyfed College of Art, before retiring from teaching to focus on commission work.

Rees designed stone carvings for The Vicar of Dibley TV series, for opening titles in other UK comedies and designed works for public buildings including the Senedd in Cardiff, Wales. In 1982, he carved the memorial stone for Lewis Carroll, which was installed in Poets' Corner, Westminster Abbey. His carving of a daffodil featured on the 30p E stamp issued as part of a set to mark the establishment of the Welsh Assembly in 1999.

== Later fame ==
Rees's later claim to fame was via the "Best Unintentional ASMR" channel on YouTube. This YouTube video came about due to a project from "Artisan Media" in 2012. They had intended to video tape artists at work and sell the videos, however, he was "too niche" so they uploaded it to YouTube and abandoned the project, as did Rees himself. It would be eventually picked up by a YouTube channel known as "Best Unintentional ASMR" where it would go on to gather more than 5.6 million views, spawn a "GoFundMe" campaign, and get him interviewed by the BBC, The South Wales Guardian and Inside Edition.

== Death ==
Rees' death was announced on 14 November 2025.

== Works ==
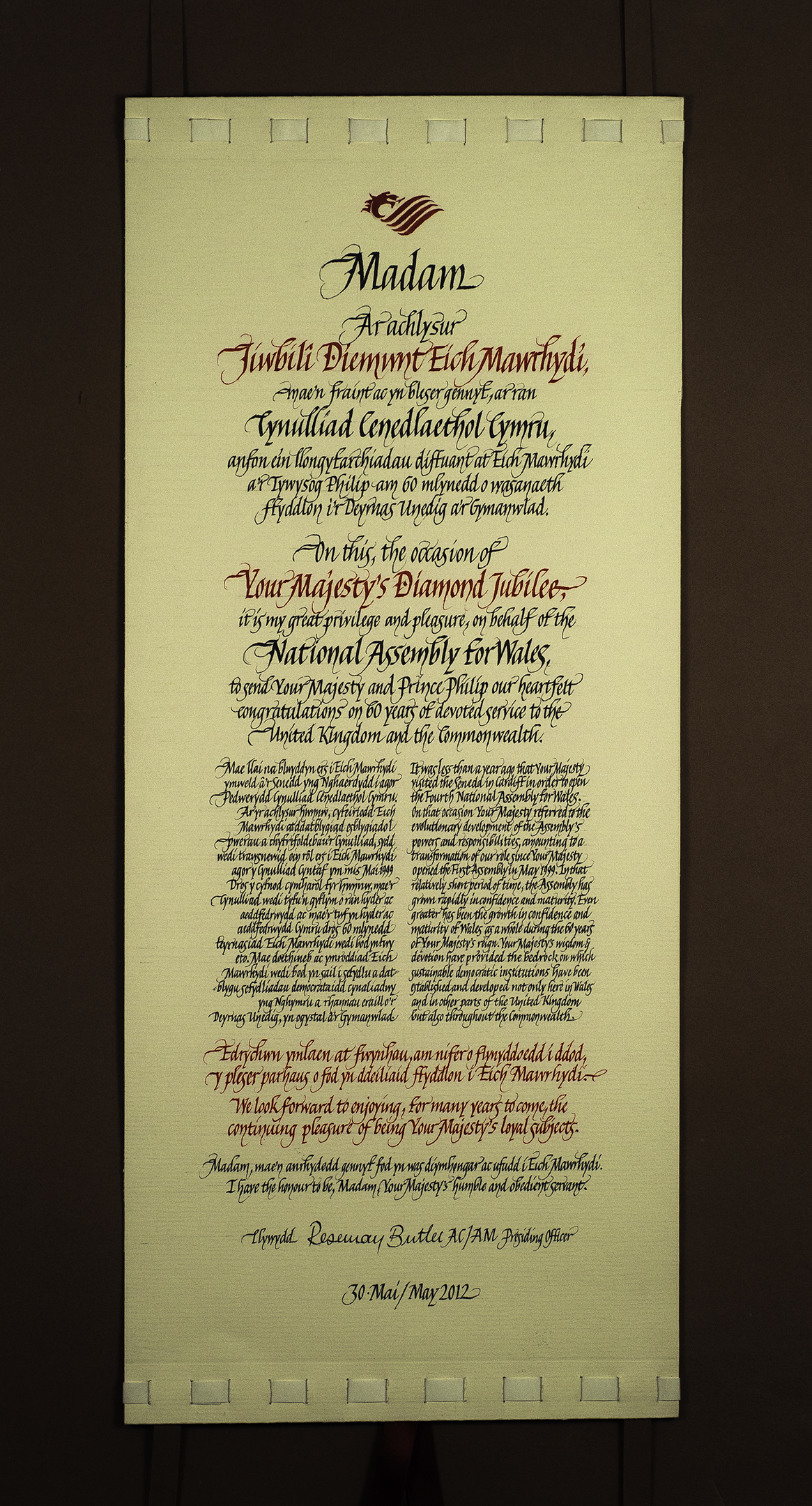
Jubilee scroll - Sgrôl y Jiwbilî (7294582196) - Given to Queen Elizabeth on her Diamond Jubilee

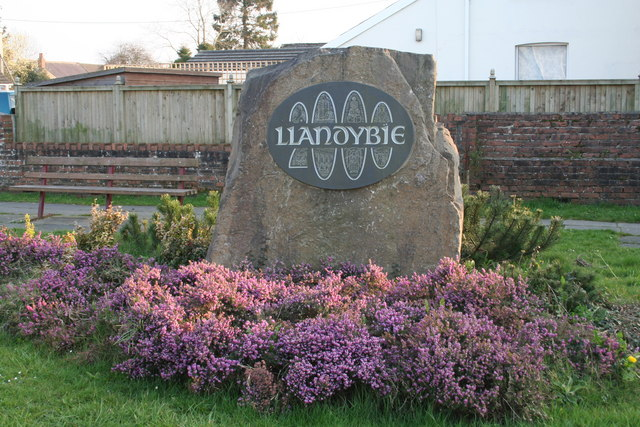
The Llandybie Millennium Stone This stone from a local quarry was erected on Llandybie square in 2000. The calligraphy is by Rees
