= Pembrey railway station =

Former railway station in Wales

Pembrey

General information
- Location: Pembrey, Carmarthenshire; Wales
- Coordinates: 51.6868°N 4.2760°W
- Grid reference: SN427011
- Platforms: 1

Other information
- Status: Disused

History
- Original company: Burry Port and Gwendraeth Valley Railway
- Pre-grouping: Great Western Railway
- Post-grouping: Great Western Railway

Key dates
- 2 August 1909: Station opened
- 1 July 1924: Renamed Pembrey
- 21 September 1953: Station closed
Location

Pembrey railway station or Pembrey Halt railway station served the village of Pen-bre or Pembrey. It continued to serve the inhabitants of the area between 1909 and 1953 and was one of several basic halts opened on the Burry Port and Gwendraeth Valley Railway in Carmarthenshire, Wales.

== History ==
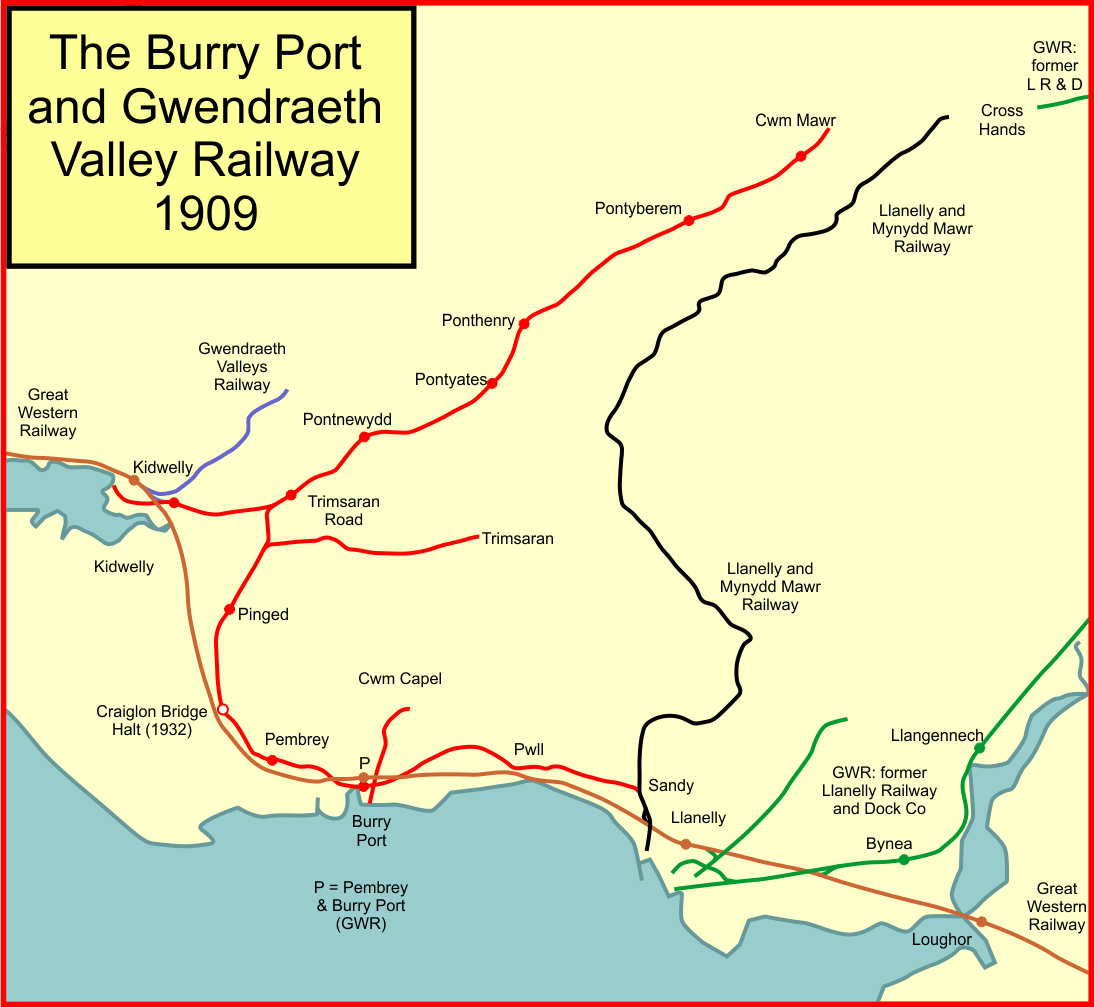
The BP&GVR system in 1909.

The station was opened as Pembrey Halt on 2 August 1909 by the Burry Port and Gwendraeth Valley Railway on the Kidwelly and Burry Port section of the line and was closed by the British Transport Commission in 1953 with the last passenger train running on Saturday 19 September 1953. It was on the southern section of the Burry Port and Gwendraeth Valley Railway with Craiglon Bridge Halt to the north and Burry Port to the south at the end of the passenger line.

The line had been built on the course of an old canal with resulting tight curves, low bridge clearance and a tendency to flooding. The freight service continued for coal traffic on the Cwmmawr branch to Kidwelly until 1996 by which time the last of the local collieries had closed down and the washery closure followed.

Pembrey and Burry Port on the West wales line lies to the east.

== Infrastructure ==
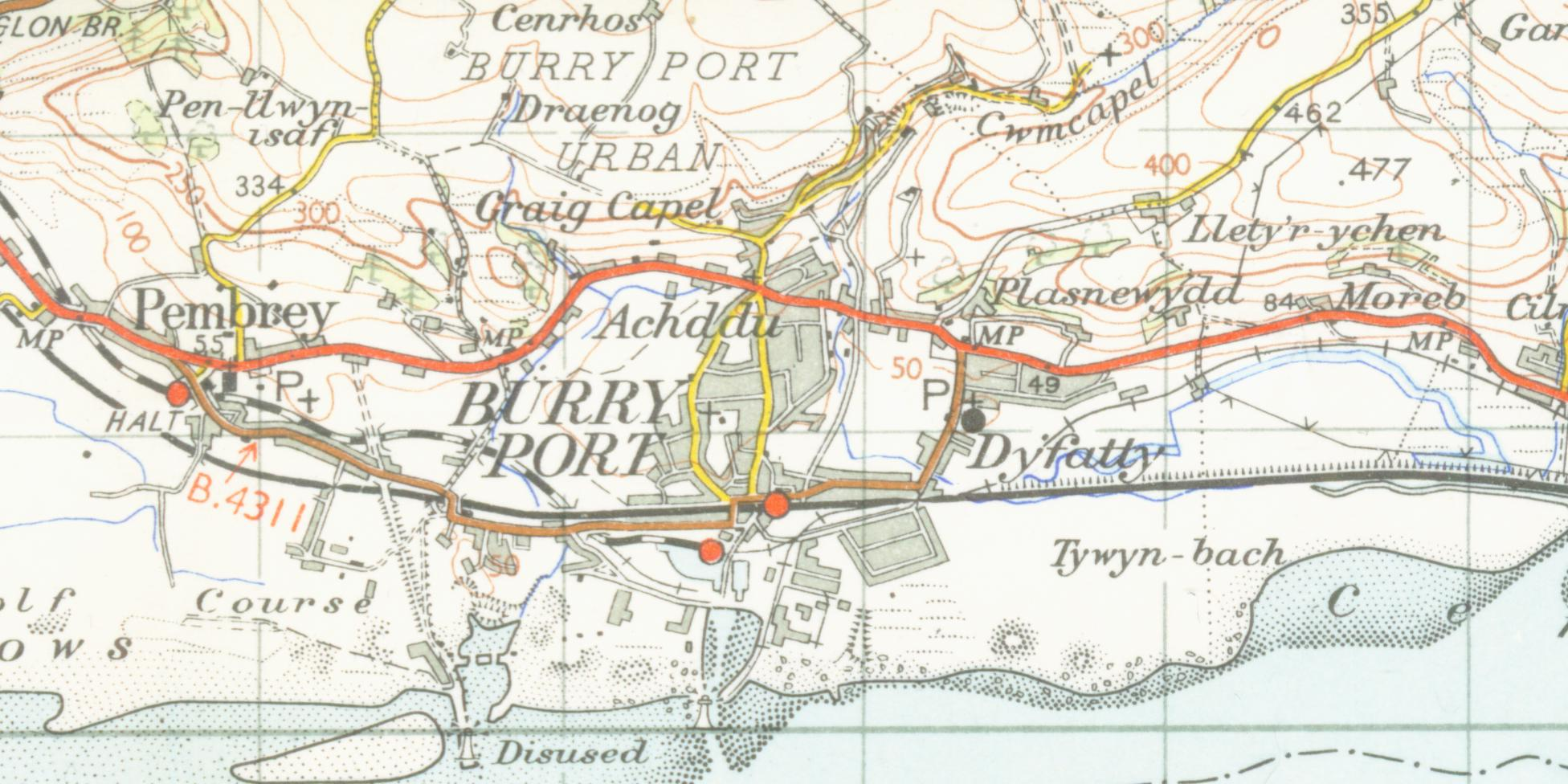
OS map of Pembrey and Burry Port in 1954.

The station had a single short platform and a shelter on the southern side of the single track line. The halt lay slightly to the north of the road bridge and was close to the village centre; the station had no public sidings. The overbridge remains, once a canal bridge prior to the railway, cyclepath and walkway. The railway was built on the bed of the former Llanelly & Kidwelly Canal.

The Kidwelly route was used for coal trains, resulting in the lifting of track between Trimsaran Road and Burry Port by 2005.

== Services ==
The station was open for use by the general public.

== Remnants ==
The section of the old line between Burry Port and Craiglon Bridge Halt is now a footpath and the NCN 4 cyclepath.

== Routes ==
Preceding station	Historical railways	Following station
Craiglon Bridge Halt; Line and station closed	Burry Port and Gwendraeth Valley Railway; Great Western Railway	Burry Port; Line and station Closed

== See also ==
- West Wales lines
