= Arthur Mainwaring Bowen =

Welsh solicitor

Arthur Charles Mainwaring Bowen (24 March 1922 – 31 January 1980) was a Welsh solicitor who founded the charity "British Rheumatism & Arthritis Association" (now known as "Versus Arthritis").

== Early life ==
Born to an English mother and a Welsh father, Bowen spent his earliest years on his family's farm, Pentrebach in Pontyberem, Carmarthenshire.

He was educated at Gwendraeth Grammar School, and left with a higher school certificate. In 1940 he started studying history at University College, Aberystwyth. From there he was awarded a Welsh Church Scholarship to read history at Oxford University.

In 1941 he fell while training with the Officer Training Corps in Aberystwyth, which triggered the rheumatic condition ankylosing spondylitis. He was bed-ridden initially while he was treated in Cardiff Hospital in 1941, then in the Royal National Hospital for Rheumatic Diseases in 1942. He was consequently unable to take up his place at Oxford and this experience gave him the idea of a national charity to assist young people with rheumatism in their educational ambitions.

Bowen continued to struggle with his own education while also garnering support for his idea of a charity. He began a course in architecture in 1943 which he had to abandon because of his health. In 1946 he graduated from the University of London with a BA in economics, constitutional law and history.

== British Rheumatism and Arthritis Association (arthritis care) ==
Bowen conceived the idea of a national charity to assist young people with arthritis and rheumatism in their education in 1942. He spent most of the time he was in hospital lobbying MPs, medics, the press and various members of the aristocracy, which led to the formation of the British Rheumatism and Arthritis Association in 1947. In 1949, Bowen took on the formal role of executive vice-president, and in 1976 became the charity's honorary legal adviser.

In 2017 Arthritis Care was the largest UK charity delivering services to arthritis patients, with 170 branches, over 10,000 members and £5.5 million of assets.

== Other philanthropic activities ==
From 1943 to 1945 Bowen campaigned for Further Education for disabled ex-service men and women. He initiated a number of smaller-scale organisations, including the "BRA Holiday Hotel scheme" (1956), the BRA Home South-West (1973), the National Disabled Youth Centre Trust (1975), the Torbay Arthritis Clinic (1970) and the Torbay Sheltered Workshop (1972). He was the chairman of the Torbay and District Disablement Advisory Committee (Dept. of Employment) 1969 - 1975. He was also a trustee of the Pinder Children's Trust and the Open University Medical Society (dates unknown).

== Personal life ==
Bowen was married to Helen Patricia Cope, an occupational therapist, on 29 August 1953. They had one daughter Philippa, and one son Jonathan born in 1962. He died on 31 January 1980.
