= Cennad =

Welsh medical magazine

Cennad: cylchgrawn Y Gymdeithas Feddygol was a Welsh-language trade magazine containing articles on clinical and general medicine in Wales. it was published by Y Gymdeithas Feddygol, which was formed in 1975 to provide an opportunity for doctors and medical students to discuss clinical topics in Welsh. Cennad was published from 1980 to 2003 and has been digitised by the Welsh Journals Online project at the National Library of Wales.
