= Trimsaran Road railway station =

Former railway station in Wales

Trimsaran Road

General information
- Location: Kidwelly, Carmarthenshire; Wales
- Coordinates: 51.7319°N 4.2724°W
- Grid reference: SN431061
- Platforms: 1

Other information
- Status: Disused

History
- Original company: Burry Port and Gwendraeth Valley Railway
- Pre-grouping: Great Western Railway
- Post-grouping: Great Western Railway

Key dates
- 2 August 1909: Station opened
- 21 September 1953: Station closed
Location

Trimsaran Road railway station was opened in 1909 at Morfa It continued to serve the inhabitants of the Trimsaran area between 1909 and 1953 and was one of several basic halts opened on the Burry Port and Gwendraeth Valley Railway in Carmarthenshire, Wales. It lay some distance to the west of the village of Trimsaran.

== History ==
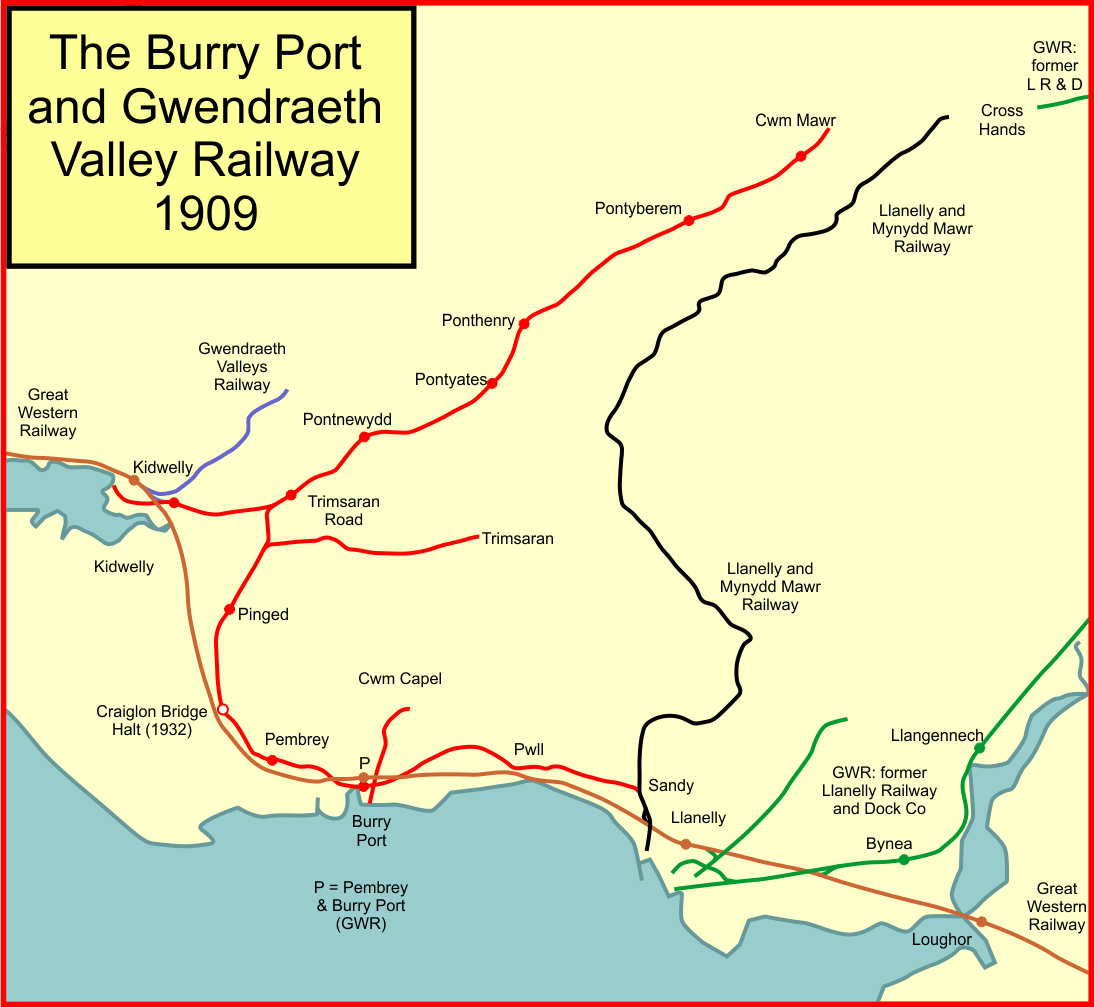
The BP&GVR system in 1909.

The station was opened on 2 August 1909 by the Burry Port and Gwendraeth Valley Railway on the Kidwelly and Burry Port section of the line and was closed by the British Transport Commission in 1953 with the last passenger train running on Saturday 19 September 1953. It was on the southern section of the Burry Port and Gwendraeth Valley Railway with Pinged located to the south and Glyn Abbey to the north of the East Kidwelly Junction. A rural area with a school nearby.

The railway was originally a freight only line, built on the route of an old canal and prone to flooding, but stations were established due to pressure from the public. The freight service continued for coal traffic until 1996 by which time the last of the local collieries had closed down. The Kidwelly route was used for coal trains, resulting in the lifting of track between Trimsaran Road and Burry Port by 2005.

A public house,'The Plough', stood nearby.

== Infrastructure ==
The station had one wooden platform on the eastern side of this single track line with a small wooden shelter. The station had no public sidings but several coal traffic related sidings stood to the south on the other side of the road overbridge.

== Services ==
The station was open for use by the general public. Circa 1898 passenger trains for the use of miners ran from Burry Port, calling at Trimsaran Road to transport colliers who had walked there from the Kidwelly area.

== Remnants ==
The section south of Pinged, between Burry Port and Craiglon Bridge Halt is now a footpath and cycleway.

== Routes ==
Preceding station	Historical railways	Following station
Pinged; Line and station closed	Burry Port and Gwendraeth Valley Railway; Great Western Railway	Glyn Abbey; Line and station Closed

== See also ==
- West Wales lines
