= Williams and Parkinson Boat Builders =

Williams and Parkinson of Deganwy quay were traditional boat builders in North Wales established by Cyril Williams in 1930, later on becoming Williams and Nixon following the Second World War and continuing to build until 1979.

Classic wooden boats were built by Williams using traditional techniques mostly in oak, pitch pine, mahogany and teak.

The famous and historically important Gentleman's Motor Yacht Sea Mew was built by Williams and Parkinson in 1936 and was used as one of the Little ships of Dunkirk that rescued the British army off the beaches of Dunkirk in the second world war.

Another pedigree model built at the shipyard was the 'Conway Class' 34 ft Bermudan cutter sailing yacht designed by W.H Rowland (who also is accredited as a boatbuilder himself with his shipyard W.H Rowland & Co, Bangor) who was also the boat builder of the Seabird Half Rater. Only four of this design were built with one of the finer examples c1938 'Cumulus' surviving to this day on the South Coast of England, having a rich history as a Royal Ocean Racing Club class performer and race winner.

Williams and Nixon also built a number of the Hilbre Island One Design, a racing keelboat built to a strict design specification and raced at West Kirby Sailing Club in north west England. The class is named after an island in the mouth of the river Dee. To date there have been 55 built. The first boat was completed in 1958 but most of the 55 examples built were constructed between 1960 and 1963. The class has a Portsmouth Yardstick of 1290.

The original boat Hilbre, number 1, was demonstrated in the Menai Straits in 1958 however during her trip from the builders, Williams & Nixon in Deganwy to the Straits she was dismasted whilst under tow! This failed to put off interest and 7 boats were ordered to be built by Enterprise Small Craft Company in Rock Ferry and Williams & Nixon in Deganwy, 6 for private owners and the 7th to be raffled by West Kirby Sailing Club. Priced originally at £350.00 for the hull and spars and £150.00 for a full set of sails (now approximately £1,800.00), the original boat found an eager market which was met with the additional builders who were duly authorised.

Williams Boat Builders of Deganwy Quay
