= Cyril Herbert Williams =

Cyril Herbert Williams CMG OBE
- Born: 27 December 1908
- Died: 27 November 1983 (aged 74); Sussex
- Education: Bedford Modern School
- Alma mater: Jesus College, Cambridge
- Occupation: Colonial Administrator
- Known for: Provincial Commissioner of the Nyanza Province (1951-56)

Cyril Herbert Williams CMG OBE (1908-1983) was Provincial Commissioner of the Nyanza Province of Kenya (1951–56).

== Life ==
Cyril Herbert Williams was born on 27 December 1908, the son of Thomas Ethelbert Williams. He was educated at Bedford Modern School and Jesus College, Cambridge. In 1929 he played for Cambridge in the Varsity Match, earning a blue, and also played for Bedford in the 1930–31 season.

Williams entered the colonial service in Kenya in 1931, later becoming Provincial Commissioner of the Nyanza Province (1951–56), a member of the Kenya Council of State (1961–64) and Chairman of Naivasha County Council (1963). He was invested as an Officer of the Order of the British Empire in 1949 and a Companion of the Order of St Michael and St George in 1956.

Williams married Patricia Joy Collyer on 15 February 1936. They had a son and twin daughters. Williams died on 27 November 1983.
