= Pontyberem =

Village and community in Carmarthenshire, Wales

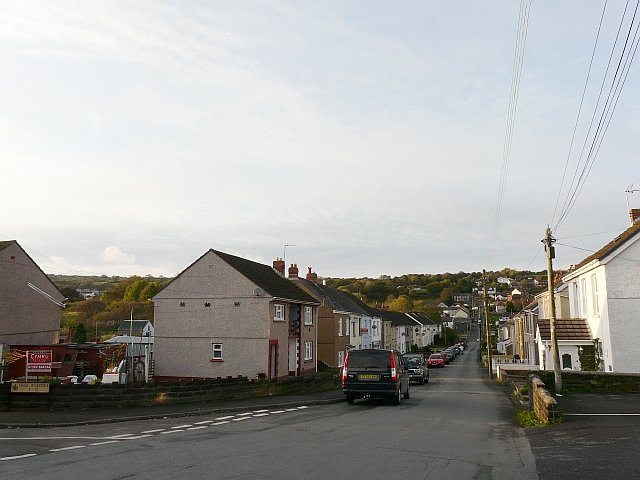
- Pontyberem

- Location within Carmarthenshire
- Population: 2,768
- OS grid reference: SN501111
- Community: Pontyberem
- Principal area: Carmarthenshire
- Preserved county: Dyfed
- Country: Wales
- Sovereign state: United Kingdom
- Post town: LLANELLI
- Postcode district: SA15
- Dialling code: 01269
- Police: Dyfed-Powys
- Fire: Mid and West Wales
- Ambulance: Welsh
- UK Parliament: Llanelli
- Senedd Cymru – Welsh Parliament: Llanelli
- List of places UK Wales Carmarthenshire 51.779°N 4.174°W Map of the community

Pontyberem (Welsh pronunciation) is a village and community situated in the Gwendraeth Valley halfway between Carmarthen and Llanelli in Carmarthenshire, Wales. As of the 2001 Census, the population was recorded as 2,829, reducing to 2,768 at the 2011 Census.

The community is bordered by the communities of: Llanddarog; Gorslas; Llannon; Llanelli Rural; and Llangyndeyrn, all being in Carmarthenshire.

== History ==
The village grew during the late 19th century and early 20th century with the growth of the coal mining industry in the area. There were four principal mines in the Pontyberem Area; Pontyberem colliery which was opened in 1845, Pentremawr (1889–c. 1974), Glynhebog (1892–1949) and Gwendraeth colliery (Watney pit). It was in the Gwendraeth colliery (Watney pit)in 1852 that a terrible disaster took place : 26 men and boys died when water flooded the mine killing all the miners on the night shift. It is said that it took 18 months to recover the bodies . Due to the demise of the coal industry in the South Wales Coalfield, there are now no high quality anthracite coal mines operating in the Gwendraeth Valley.

Between 1909 and 1953 Pontyberem station on what had been the Burry Port and Gwendraeth Valley Railway, served the miners and the residents of the village and locality.

The renowned Pontyberem safety lamps were made by John Jones (1879–1976) who worked as Colliery Chief Mechanic at Pentremawr Colliery.

The name Pontyberem originates from three separate Welsh language words, pont meaning bridge, aber meaning mouth of a river (into the sea), estuary, confluence of a lesser with a larger river and Beran after Nant Beran the river that flows through Pontyberem .

'Although not immediately obvious the element aber once formed part of this place name and referred to the location of the pont (bridge) over the river Gwendraeth Fawr just below its confluence with Nant Beran.

It was probably lost through the contraction of aber and the river name Beran. The -a- of aber was then interpreted as the definite article y and Beran was probably influenced by berem, a variant of burum (yeast).'

Local people understand the name Pontyberem to originate from a simple combination of words. The 'Berem' refers to the frothy buildup (like yeast) on the surface of the water of the Nant Beran, especially near the bridge (Pont) over the Gwendraeth Fawr.

== Welsh Language ==
The Welsh language is spoken widely in Pontyberem. In 1991 Pontyberem was recorded as having, with Quarter Bach, the highest levels of Welsh speakers in Carmarthenshire. According to the 2001 Census, 81.28% (1961:91% :1991:80.5%) of the population have one or more skills in Welsh with 60.83% able to speak, read and write it. In a survey conducted by Mori for Carmarthenshire County Council in 2000 people were asked how well they spoke Welsh. In the Gwendraeth valley 47% said very well, 17% said fairly well, 10% said not very well with 25% saying not at all. Menter Cwm Gwendraeth, the first community Welsh language initiative is based at Pontyberem. Menter Cwm Gwendraeth started in 1991 following the successful Urdd Gobaith Cymru and National Eisteddfod held in the Gwendraeth Valley.

Both primary schools in Pontyberem, Pontyberem Primary School and Bancffosfelen Primary School, are Category A schools where the majority of the curriculum is taught through the medium of Welsh.

== Schools ==
- Ysgol Gynradd Pontyberem / Pontyberem Primary School
- Ysgol Gynradd Bancffosfelen / Bancffosfelen Primary School

== Sport ==
- Rugby union - Pontyberem RFC : Pontyberem Recreational Park, Heol y Parc, Pontyberem
- Football - Pontyberem Recreational Park, Heol y Parc, Pontyberem
- Cricket - Pontyberem C.C.

== Notable people ==
- Arthur Daniels (1922–2001) – Wales and Great Britain rugby league international
- John Jones (Shoni Sguborfawr) (1811–1858) – Demolished the toll gates at Pontyberem during the Rebecca Riots
- Nigel Owens (1971– ) – International rugby union referee
- Dorothy Squires (1915–1998) – Singer
- Arthur "Waring" Bowen (1922–1980) – founder of Arthritis Care
- Rob Wainwright (civil servant) (1967– ) – Partner Deloitte
- Jonny Clayton (1974– ) – Professional Darts Player
- Lady Amy Parry-Williams (1910–1988) – Singer & Writer
- Ieuan Rees (1941-2025) – Stone Cutter
