= Cyril Williams (rugby union) =

England international rugby union player

- Full name: Cyril Stoate Williams
- Born: 17 November 1887 Stroud, Gloucestershire, England
- Died: 18 November 1978 (aged 91) Victoria, British Columbia, Canada

Rugby union career
- Position: Fullback
International career
Years	Team	Apps	(Points)
1910	England	1	(0)

Cyril Stoate Williams (17 November 1887 – 18 November 1978) was an English international rugby union player.

Born in Stroud, Gloucestershire, Williams played his rugby for Manchester and was praised by the 1906–07 Springboks as the best fullback they faced, having appeared against the touring South Africans with Lancashire. He gained his only England cap standing in for Billy Johnston against France at Paris in 1910.

Williams immigrated to British Columbia and served with the Canadian Expeditionary Force in World War I.

== See also ==
- List of England national rugby union players
