= Cyril G. Williams =

Welsh religious scholar

Cyril Glyndwr Williams (1 June 1921 – 31 May 2004) was a Welsh religious scholar, Congregationalist minister and academic. He was professor of religions at Carleton University from 1968 to 1973 and president of the British Association for the Study of Religions from 1985 to 1988. He was a graduate of the University of Wales and had lectured on the history of religion at University College Cardiff from 1958 to 1969. After his time at Carleton University, he was successively senior lecturer (1973–75) and reader in religious studies at the University College of Wales at Aberystwyth. He was later given a personal chair there. In 1983, his department merged into the Department of Theology and Religious Studies at Saint David's University College, Lampeter.

Williams married Irene Daniels in 1945 and had three children, one of whom is Martyn Huw Williams, the journalist and broadcaster.
