= Arthritis Australia =

Nonprofit organization

- Formation: 1949 (Australian Arthritis and Rheumatism Foundation)
- Type: Non-profit organisation
- Legal status: Foundation
- Headquarters: Sydney, NSW
- Coordinates: 33°53′03.0″S 151°11′37.3″E
- Region served: Australia
- CEO: Louise Hardy
- Main organ: Board of Directors
- Website: arthritisaustralia.org.au

Arthritis Australia is a charitable not-for-profit organisation advocating for people with arthritis and musculoskeletal conditions.

Arthritis Australia awards nearly $1 million in annual funding to researchers engaged in basic and clinical research that aims to further knowledge of arthritis and develop treatments and cures. Grant recipients are mostly early or mid-career scientists and clinicians. One-year fellowships, project grants and scholarships are also offered.

In 2012, Arthritis Australia partnered with the Bupa Health Foundation to create MyJointPain.org.au. The website creates a tailored management plan for people living with chronic joint pain from osteoarthritis and provides comprehensive information to help them manage their condition and improve their mobility.

== Ease of use packaging ==
Arthritis Australia established the Ease of Use program to help industries fix issues with hard-to-open packaging. The scheme has tested more than 200 products, including products from Nestlé, Woolworths, Kellogg's and SPC Ardmona.

Packaging accessibility has become an issue due to two trends: an ageing population with reduced strength and functional limitations, and an increase in "packaging rage" or "wrap rage" – the coined terms for the anger consumers feel when they cannot open packaging. Data from a 2013 Catalyst Research survey showed that one in two Australians have injured themselves opening packaging. Of those, 42% of people suffered a deep cut they treated at home when trying to open packaging.

To assist the packaging industry with these trends, Arthritis Australia developed a variety of tests to assist retailers and manufacturers. One of these tests, the Initial Scientific Review (ISR), was developed as part of a consortium that included Nestlé, NSW Health and Georgia Tech. The ISR report evaluates packaging for ease of opening and accessibility, as well as providing a score based on the Accessibility Benchmarking Scale (ABS). The ABS score estimates the percentage of the population that can open the packaging and allows organisations to compare suppliers. For hospitals, the ISR allows them to work with manufacturers to make modifications to packaging as recommended on the ISR and improve packaging accessibility for hospital patients.

== See also ==
- Versus Arthritis
