= Arthritis UK =

UK charity

- Predecessor: Arthritis Research UK; Arthritis Care
- Founded: 2018 (tracing its origins to 1936)
- Headquarters: Chesterfield, Derbyshire
- Location: United Kingdom
- Website: www.arthritis-uk.org
- Formerly called: Versus Arthritis

Arthritis UK is the United Kingdom's largest charity supporting people with arthritis. It was launched as Versus Arthritis in 2018, following the legal merger of the country's two leading arthritis charities, Arthritis Research UK and Arthritis Care in 2017 and adopted its current name in 2025. Its patron is Queen Camilla.

According to research, 10 million people in the UK are affected by arthritis. It affects almost three in 10 men and women over the age of 55. Versus Arthritis works to help them to remain active by funding research, campaigning and providing information for patients, the public and health professionals.

== History ==
=== Arthritis Care ===
Arthur Mainwaring Bowen founded the British Rheumatic Association (BRA) in February 1947 at the age of 25. By October, the association had 554 prospective members. Bowen's awareness of the needs of people with arthritis began when, at the age of 19, he was diagnosed with ankylosing spondylitis. Meeting other young people with arthritis during long stays in hospital opened Bowen's eyes to the isolation they often felt. As well as his charity work, Bowen had a career as a qualified solicitor. He died in his home in 1980.

By this time, the charity had grown into a national organisation with a wide range of services for people with arthritis and was renamed Arthritis Care. In that year, Arthritis News was published for the first time. It ran to 12 pages and had an initial print-run of 35,000. Jane Asher became president of Arthritis Care in 2003.

At the time of the merger, Arthritis Care was the UK's largest arthritis charity and ran four national offices (one each in England, Wales, Scotland and Northern Ireland) with activities coordinated by an office in London.

=== Arthritis Research UK ===
The Empire Rheumatism Council (ERC) was founded by Dr Will Copeman and other like-minded doctors on 10 February 1936 as a voluntary organisation to finance research into arthritis and all rheumatic diseases. It was incorporated in 1951 and changed its name to the Arthritis and Rheumatism Council for Research in Great Britain and the Commonwealth in 1964, which was shortened to the Arthritis Research Campaign in 1998, before becoming Arthritis Research UK in 2010 as part of a drive to raise the profile of both arthritis research and the organisation itself. This also reduced the potential for confusion with a plethora of other charitable groups using the ARC initials.

The Canadian Arthritis Society, Australian Arthritis and Rheumatism Foundation and New Zealand Rheumatism Association were affiliated organisations.

Dr Stewart Adams, discoverer of Ibuprofen, opened the Arthritis Research UK Pain Centre, which investigates the mechanisms that lead to chronic pain in order to improve treatment, at the University of Nottingham in 2010.

== See also ==
- Arthritis Australia
- The Swedish Rheumatism Association
- Arthritis Foundation (USA)
