= Craiglon Bridge Halt railway station =

Former railway station in Wales

Craiglon Bridge

General information
- Location: Pembrey, Carmarthenshire; Wales
- Coordinates: 51.6958°N 4.2902°W
- Grid reference: SN418021
- Platforms: 1

Other information
- Status: Disused

History
- Post-grouping: Great Western Railway

Key dates
- 1 February 1932: Station opened
- 21 September 1953: Station closed
Location

Craiglon Bridge Halt railway station may have served the Craig-Lon Colliery and its workers near Pembrey, but this business was closed in the 1930s. It continued to serve the inhabitants of the Lando area between 1932 and 1953 and was one of several basic halts opened on the Burry Port and Gwendraeth Valley Railway in Carmarthenshire, Wales. A firing range was located nearby in WWII.

== History ==
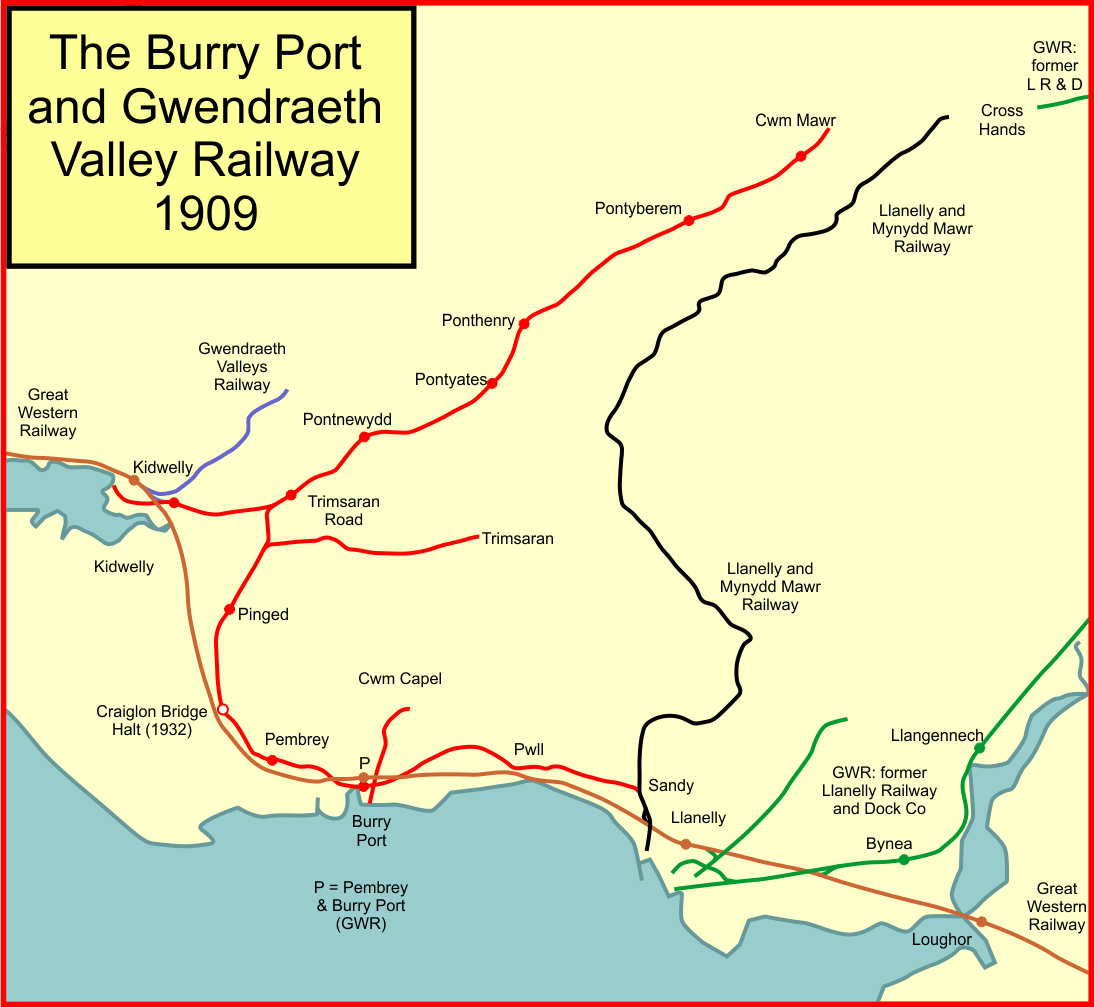
The BP&GVR system in 1909.

The station was opened on 1 February 1932 by the Great Western Railway on the Kidwelly and Burry Port section of the line and was closed by the British Transport Commission in 1953 with the last passenger train running on Saturday 19 September 1953. It was on the southern section of the Burry Port and Gwendraeth Valley Railway with Pembrey located to the south and Pinged to the north.

A public house, the Butchers' Arms, stood across the road bridge to the west. The station is shown as open in 1945 - 1947 after the Craig Lon colliery had been closed. By 1951 - 1961 the station is shown as closed. The railway was originally a freight only line, but stations were established due to pressure from the public.

Craig-lon Colliery had opened in the 18th century, was extended in the 19th and joined with others in 1918 to form the Pembrey Collieries Ltd but closed in the 1930s. In WWII part of the site was used as a firing range.

The line had been built on the course of an old canal with resulting tight curves, low bridge clearance and a tendency to flooding. The freight service continued for coal traffic until 1996 by which time the last of the local collieries had closed down.

== Infrastructure ==
The station had a one single carriage length wooden platform on the western side of this single track line with a small shelter. The halt lay slightly to the north of the road bridge. The station had no public sidings, but a single siding exchange freight facility was present to the south with an exchange siding for Craig or Graig Lon Colliery and a track ran up to the Craig Lon colliery. The overbridge remains, once a canal bridge prior to the railway and cyclepath and walkway.

The Kidwelly route was used for coal trains, resulting in the lifting of track between Trimsaran Road and Burry Port by 2005.

== Services ==
The station was open for use by the general public and by miners from Craig Lon colliery.

== Remnants ==
The section of the old line between Burry Port and Craiglon Bridge Halt is now a footpath and cycleway, however the old entrance to the halt is still in use.

== Routes ==
Preceding station	Historical railways	Following station
Pembrey; Line and station closed	Burry Port and Gwendraeth Valley Railway; Great Western Railway	Pinged; Line and station Closed

== See also ==
- West Wales lines
