= Pinged railway station =

Former railway station in Wales

Pinged
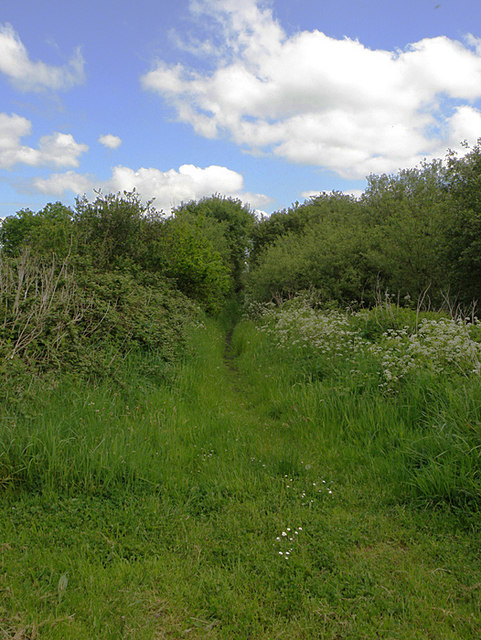
- Railway trackbed near Pinged

General information
- Location: Pembrey, Carmarthenshire; Wales
- Coordinates: 51.7117°N 4.2885°W
- Grid reference: SN419039
- Platforms: 1

Other information
- Status: Disused

History
- Original company: Burry Port and Gwendraeth Valley Railway
- Pre-grouping: Great Western Railway
- Post-grouping: Great Western Railway

Key dates
- 2 August 1909: Station opened
- 2 October 1922: Station renamed as 'Pinged'
- 21 September 1953: Station closed
Location

Pinged Halt railway station was opened in 1909 but was renamed Pinged railway station in 1922. It continued to serve the inhabitants of the Pinged area between 1909 and 1953 and was one of several basic halts opened on the Burry Port and Gwendraeth Valley Railway in Carmarthenshire, Wales.

== History ==
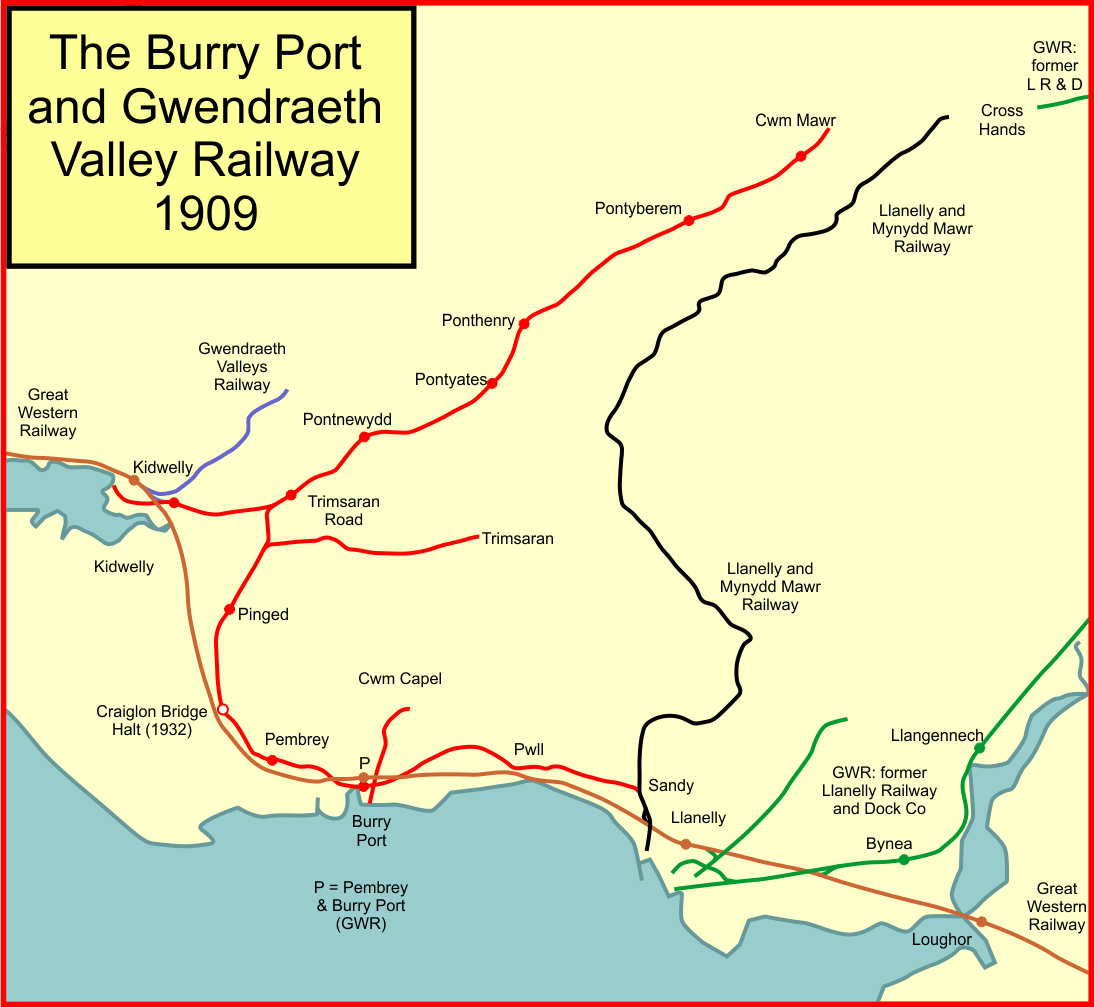
The BP&GVR system in 1909.

The station was opened on 2 August 1909 by the Burry Port and Gwendraeth Valley Railway on the Kidwelly and Burry Port section of the line and was closed by the British Transport Commission in 1953 with the last passenger train running on Saturday 19 September 1953. It was on the southern section of the Burry Port and Gwendraeth Valley Railway with Craiglon Bridge Halt located to the south and Trimsaran Road to the north. A rural area with a school nearby.

The railway was originally a freight only line, built on the route of an old canal with tight curves and low bridge clearance and prone to flooding, but stations were established due to pressure from the public. The freight service continued for coal traffic until 1996 by which time the last of the local collieries had closed down. A public house,'The Plough', stood nearby.

== Infrastructure ==
The station had one wooden platform on the eastern side of this single track line with a small wooden shelter. The station had no public sidings. A level crossing stood to the north of the station.

The Kidwelly route was used for coal trains, resulting in the lifting of track between Trimsaran Road and Burry Port by 2005.

== Services ==
The station was open for use by the general public.

== Remnants ==
The section south of Pinged, between Burry Port and Craiglon Bridge Halt is now a footpath and cycleway.

== Routes ==
Preceding station	Historical railways	Following station
Craiglon Bridge Halt; Line and station closed	Burry Port and Gwendraeth Valley Railway; Great Western Railway	Trimsaran Road; Line and station Closed

== See also ==
- West Wales lines
