= Great Western Railway in West Wales =

GWR operations in West Wales

Coordinates: 51°50′N 4°30′W

The Great Western Railway was a railway company that was dominant in West Wales, in the United Kingdom.

The main line from Swansea to Neyland, a port on Milford Haven Waterway, was opened as a broad-gauge line by the South Wales Railway from 1852, and that company merged with the Great Western Railway in 1862. The main line was converted to "narrow gauge" (later known as "standard gauge") in 1872, and most of the original main line is in use today.

Several independent lines were opened in West Wales, and at the "grouping" of the railways in 1923 most of them were absorbed by the Great Western Railway. Some of them were chiefly mineral railways, and many have closed as the industries they served declined. Some rural routes too have closed, but branch lines to Pembroke and Milford Haven, and a main line extension to Fishguard are still in operation.

== Predecessor waggonways and canals ==
Although the economy of south-west Wales was predominantly agricultural, there were areas of mineral extraction. This chiefly consisted of coal in the area north of Llanelly and around Saundersfoot. Limestone was also quarried around Llanelly, and on a smaller scale further west and north. In the eighteenth century transport to market dominated these industries, and only locations close to water were successful. Primitive waggonways were built conveying the mineral over relatively short distances directly to the coast.

The first short part of the Carmarthenshire Railway had been opened in 1803, giving a plateway tramroad connection between coal pits and a quay at Llanelly. By 1805 the line had reached Cross Hands, high on Mynydd Mawr (Carmarthenshire), bringing good quality anthracite down from there to the sea. For a time the line flourished, but by 1832 it was in decline, and part of the lower alignment had been used for a new edge railway, while the upper parts had become derelict.

Other mineral lines now became dominant in the area, and the Carmarthenshire Railway ceased to play an important role in the traffic.

In 1812, the Kidwelly and Llanelly Canal and Tramroad Company was authorised by the Kidwelly and Llanelly Canal and Tramroad Company Act 1812 (52 Geo. 3. c. clxxiii), to build a canal serving Llanelly, with feeder waggonways serving pits. Two horse-operated waggonway branches, probably of 4 ft 2 in gauge, were built to Burry Port harbour in 1832. One of them ran north to Cwmcapel and the other east to Sandy, near Llanelly. At this point it connected with the Cille Colliery waggonway on the Stradey Estate.

== Llanelly Railway and Dock Company ==
A small group of promoters obtained an act of Parliament, the Llanelly Railway and Dock Act 1828 (9 Geo. 4. c. xci), to make a dock at Llanelly, and the Llanelly Railroad and Dock Company built the dock and a two-mile railway connecting coal pits at Dafen to it; there was a rope-worked incline from St Davids Pit down to Dafen. This was an edge railway, and traction was limited to horses.

Emboldened by the success of the initial line, the company decided to build a more ambitious line from the Llanelly Dock to pits further to the north-east. The company changed its name at this time to the Llanelly Railway and Dock Company, by an act of Parliament, the Llanelly Railway and Dock Company Act 1835 (5 & 6 Will. 4. c. xcvi), of 21 August 1835. This second line, separate from the Dafen line, opened as far as Pontardulais in 1839, extending to Duffryn and Cwmamman on 6 May 1840. In the following two years an eastward extension to pits in the Amman Valley was opened, and in 1842 a westward branch to the Great Mountain (Mynydd Mawr) was constructed.

The company operated trains itself, now using steam locomotives, and from 1850 a passenger service was run.

== South Wales Railway ==
=== Origins ===
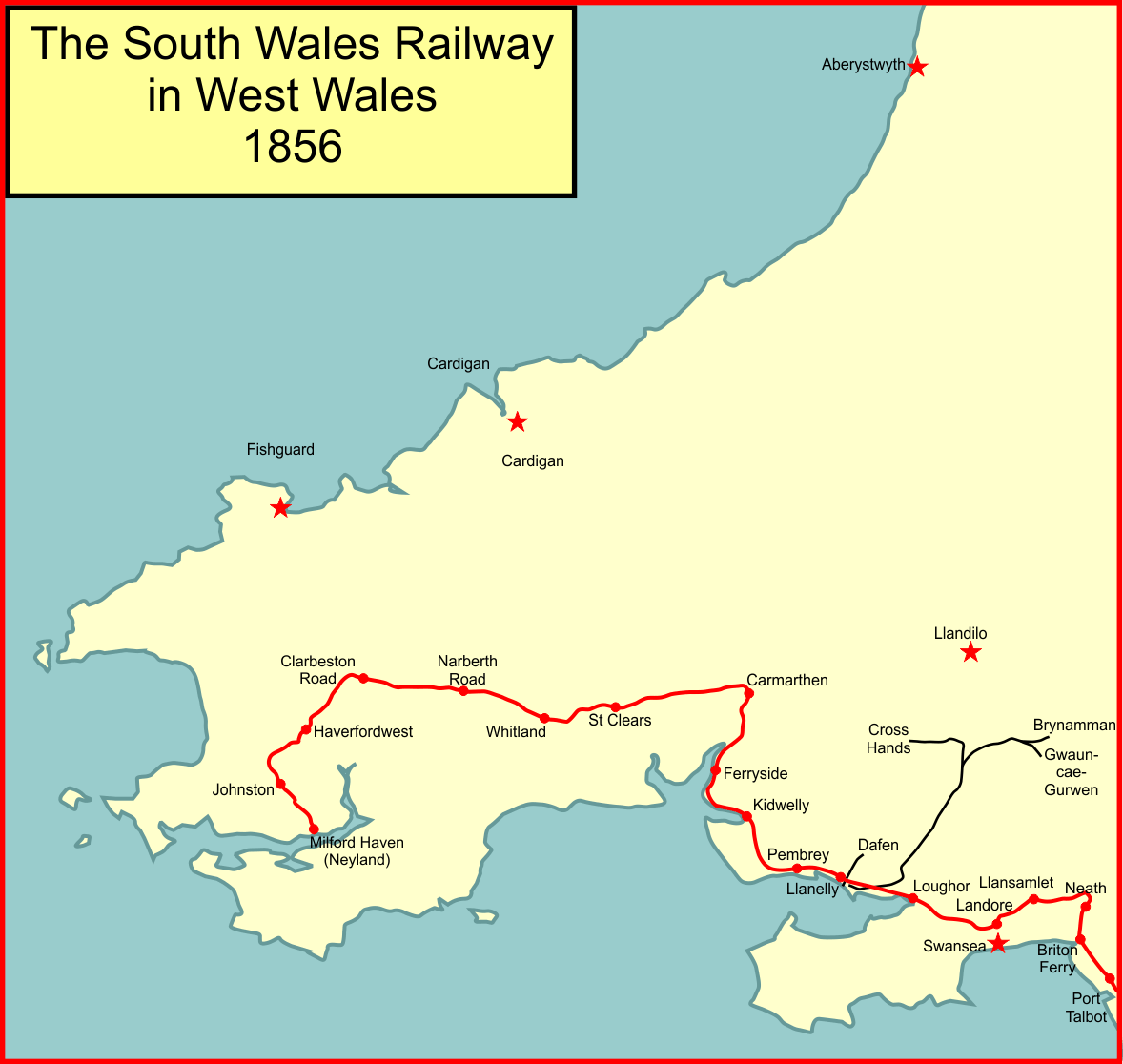
The South Wales Railway in 1856

The Great Western Railway completed its first main line between London and Bristol in 1841, and already during the construction period thought had been given to branches and extensions. The Cheltenham and Great Western Union Railway had opened part of its line, from Swindon to Cirencester, and was continuing construction to Gloucester and Cheltenham. In 1843 the Cheltenham company was absorbed by the Great Western Railway, and now planning turned to the means of reaching South Wales.

In 1844, the South Wales Railway was proposed, to run from Standish, south of Gloucester on the Cheltenham line, through Chepstow, Newport, Cardiff, and Neath, passing close to Swansea and Carmarthen, to Fishguard. There was to be a branch from Whitland to Pembroke. The Great Western Railway and its associated companies used the broad gauge, unlike most other lines in Great Britain, which used the narrow gauge, later called standard gauge.

Although the South Wales Railway was to be an independent company, it was supported by the GWR and had many mutual directors and investors, and its engineer was Isambard Kingdom Brunel. In fact when it was authorised by the South Wales Railway Act 1845 (8 & 9 Vict. c. cxc), the GWR was to subscribe £600,000 of the £2.8 million capital of the company. There was to be a swing bridge over the River Loughor (between Gowerton and Llanelly) and a drawbridge over the River Towy near Carmarthen.

There were difficulties about the selection of route east of Newport, and a further act of Parliament, the South Wales Railway Amendment Act 1846 (9 & 10 Vict. c. ccxxxix), followed; this also authorised a branch from Landore to Swansea, and a Haverfordwest branch from near the later Clarbeston Road. A perpetual lease of the line to the Great Western Railway was agreed at this time, on the basis of a rent of 5% on the capital of £4 million (shares and loans combined) and half of any surplus profit. This arrangement was to commence on the line reaching Fishguard, and meantime the GWR would work the line on behalf of the SWR.

=== Gauge of the South Wales Railway ===
In 1846, the Gauge Commission, established by Parliament, reported. The commission had been charged to consider the future track gauge of railways in Great Britain. The existence of the broad gauge throughout the Great Western Railway system and its allies, and the narrow gauge (as it was then called) on most other lines, resulted in inconvenience at the break-of-gauge: locations where the two systems met. While this was an inconvenience for passenger traffic, it was a serious problem for goods and mineral traffic, which had to be manually transshipped.

The commissioners found that the break of gauge was "a serious evil" and recommended that no further railway should be constructed on the broad gauge system, and that "some equitable means should be found of producing such entire uniformity of gauge or of adopting such other course as would admit of the Narrow Gauge carriages passing, without interruption or danger, along the Broad Gauge Lines."

The report appeared to call into question the gauge of the already authorised South Wales Railway, but the Lords of the Board of Trade, having considered the matter, modified the policy. It was their opinion that the SWR should be made on the broad gauge, and the resulting act, the Railway Regulation (Gauge) Act 1846 (9 & 10 Vict. c. 57) stated that the railways authorised

by an Act passed in the last session of Parliament, intituled An Act for making a railway to be called "The South Wales Railway" [and a modifying Act] intituled "An Act for completing the Line of the South Wales Railway", and to authorize the Construction of an Extension and certain Alterations of the said Railway, and certain Branch Railways in Connexion therewith... shall be constructed on the Gauge of Seven Feet.

Accordingly, the line was built on the broad gauge, with far-reaching consequences.

=== The Western terminal ===
As well as serving the industry and commerce of south and south-west Wales, the South Wales Railway was intended to link with a ferry between Fishguard and a harbour in Ireland in the Wexford area. By providing a transport medium between southern Ireland and the GWR network, it was hoped to secure the Post Office contract for mail between London and Dublin. This relied on a partner railway in Ireland, the Waterford, Wexford, Wicklow and Dublin Railway Company. Fishguard Bay was considered to be a suitable location for the development of a ferry port, and Brunel contemplated developing a transatlantic shipping business using Fishguard.

In 1845, there was a catastrophic failure of the potato crop on which a majority of Irish people depended for a living; this resulted in mass starvation and commercial depression, which deepened the following year. The economy in Ireland worsened considerably, and coincidentally the general economic climate throughout the United Kingdom (Note: At this period the United Kingdom consisted of Great Britain and all of Ireland.) worsened considerably making the raising of money extremely difficult.

The Irish railway promoters saw that it was hopeless to try to raise money for their railway, and for the time being indicated that they would be unable to pursue the link on the Irish side. The South Wales directors saw that building a line as far as Fishguard was futile, and approached the GWR proposing that the 5% guarantee should come into effect on the line reaching Swansea, and not Fishguard. The GWR were not amenable to this extension of their liability and declined. The South Wales Railway company naturally had to consider its position, and a certain alienation from the GWR took place at this time, signalised by the resignation of certain shared directors whose positions were now untenable.

=== First opening of the South Wales Railway ===
Construction of the first section of the South Wales Railway, between Chepstow and Swansea, had been proceeding and it opened for traffic on 18 June 1850. The crossing of the River Wye at Chepstow was not ready, and this section was therefore isolated from the rest of the railway system for two years, until the river was bridged, on 19 July 1852.

The Great Western Railway had been working the Bristol and Exeter Railway by contract, but the B&ER had taken over its own working; accordingly the GWR had a temporary surplus of rolling stock, and was able to work the SWR line from its opening.

The schism between the SWR and the GWR was partly resolved by March 1851, when the SWR determined to build to a terminal on the waterway known as Milford Haven instead of Fishguard. The location became known as Neyland. A lease of 999 years to the GWR, (more properly a working agreement) to take effect when the line was ready to Swansea, was now agreed. Meantime the line would be worked, so far as locomotive and train operation was concerned, by the GWR. Neyland would be reached by extending the Haverfordwest branch, and work on the Fishguard line beyond the intended point of junction was suspended.

=== Opening to Carmarthen 1852 ===
The next section of the SWR, from Landore to Carmarthen, was opened on 11 October 1852. The Carmarthen station was south of the present-day triangle of lines, close to the Pensarn to Cwmffrwd road (now A484). Barlow rail was used as a cheaper alternative track type; the rail had a broad splayed base and was laid direct in the ballast without sleepers. Engineering features of the route included Cockett Tunnel, of 789 yards (721 m) and preceded on the Swansea side, by three embankment stabilisation structures, two of which were slender brick large radius arches, the third, a short tunnel, a timber viaduct at Loughor with a wrought iron swing bridge opening section, a timber viaduct at Kidwelly with a wrought iron lifting bridge section.

The South Wales Railway route crossed the two lines of the Llanelly Railway and Dock Company, and the South Wales Railway Act 1845 did not specify in detail how this was to be done. It was assumed that the crossing would be on the level, but at this time the Llanelly Company wished to sell its network to the South Wales Railway, and suggested that the crossing would make its system unworkable: it demanded that the SWR pay compensation equivalent to a purchase.

The SWR had no interest in acquiring a narrow gauge (later referred to as standard gauge) mineral railway and refused. This issue dragged on for a considerable time, with the Llanelly company putting obstacles in the way, and the SWR considered crossing by a viaduct. Finally the SWR opened its line, crossing the Llanelly lines by flat crossings, and the matter was put to rest. There were also minor horse tramways crossed on the level near Llanelly.

An act of Parliament, the South Wales Railway Act 1852 (15 & 16 Vict. c. cxvii) was obtained authorising the extension from Haverfordwest to Neyland and abandonment of the Fishguard line.

The lease arrangement with the GWR was again the source of controversy, and the GWR was considered to be exploiting an unfairly high rate of charges while providing inadequate wagons for available goods traffic, and it was only after considerable negotiation that agreement was reached; even then the SWR gave notice to terminate the agreement at the earliest opportunity, on 30 June 1857.

=== Opening west of Carmarthen 1853 ===
On 2 January 1854, the line was opened from Carmarthen to Haverfordwest; it was a single line of Barlow rails. A drawbridge, capable of carrying double track later, was provided at Carmarthen to cross the River Towy.

The line onwards from Haverfordwest to Neyland was opened on 15 April 1856; the terminus was known at first as Milford Haven, (Note: Parker says "New Milford" at first but this may be a mistake.) after the waterway on which it was located; the name Neyland was adopted in 1859. The extension was a single line; there was an opening bridge with a lifting span over the River Cleddau at Haverfordwest. Although there were a few dwellings there, Neyland had no pre-existing commerce whatever, and was created entirely by the SWM. A twice-weekly ferry to Waterford was started soon after the railway opening. As the berthing facilities were expanded, four pontoons were incorporated into the works from the Cornwall Railway, where they had been used for floating the main spans of the Royal Albert Bridge at Saltash.

The distance from Neyland to Waterford was 111 miles; Wexford had been abandoned due to silting of the harbour there.

By now the use of Barlow rails on the original section of the line was found to be unsatisfactory, and this latest section was laid with bridge rails on longitudinal timbers; the earlier Barlow rail sections were progressively relaid in this form of construction; the work was a considerable financial burden.

The original act of Parliament authorising the South Wales Railway, the South Wales Railway Act 1845, had included a Pembroke branch from near Whitland. The western terminus of the line was now to be at Neyland, which was only a short ferry crossing from Pembroke Dock, and the South Wales Railway were reluctant to construct the branch. They delayed starting work, but a local person named Allen brought an action to force them to do so, under the so-called "Cardwell clause" inserted into the authorising act; this provided for a suspension of dividends if the authorised lines were not constructed.

The South Wales Railway attempted some delaying tactics, but were obliged to go to Parliament to ask for an extension of time, and the dividend for the first half of 1857 was not paid. The SWR also presented a proposal for an alternative Pembroke branch. In fact the House of Lords finally agreed with the SWR that building the Pembroke branch was no longer appropriate, and they were released from the obligation. The branch was later built independently by the Pembroke and Tenby Railway.

The line between Carmarthen and Neyland was doubled on 1 July 1857. There was now a double track broad gauge line throughout from Paddington, 285 1/4 miles in length, of which 164 miles belonged to the South Wales Railway.

The traffic on the line was buoyant, except that coal from South Wales was hampered by the gauge change from the narrow gauge lines in the valleys to the main line, and much of that traffic continued to go by coastal shipping. Cattle traffic from Ireland was especially profitable, but the anticipated transatlantic steamer traffic at Neyland did not materialise.

The Llanelly Railway and Dock company had a Llanelly station near its own dock, but the importance of connection to the emerging main line network was obvious, and the LR&D opened a short branch line to a terminus alongside the SWR Llanelly station. Nevertheless, because of the gauge difference, through running was not possible, and a transhipment shed was constructed for the transfer of goods there; these facilities opened in 1852.

=== Neyland and Milford Haven ===
The South Wales Railway terminus was on the body of water named Milford Haven; MacDermot explains the nomenclature of the railway station:

The new port was called "Milford Haven" till 1859, then for a few months by its proper name of Neyland; but by the end of that year the Railway Company christened it "New Milford," which nickname it retained for more than forty years till after the resurrection of its ancient rival Fishguard, when its real name was restored in the hour of defeat.

Neyland was selected for its deep water anchorage, but there was no community there except for a few dwellings, and an independent company was sponsored to build a short branch from Johnston to the town named Milford Haven, which had been established in 1790; by 1800, the first large buildings had been built. The Royal Navy and some shipbuilding concerns left the town after 1814, but by then it was well established.

The Milford Railway was incorporated on 5 June 1856, and it constructed the line. It arranged with the Great Western Railway, lessee of the South Wales Railway, to work the line, and in fact it was opened by the Great Western Railway on 7 September 1863, (Note: Parker says that this was when the inhabitants formed their own railway company, but that seems to be a misunderstanding.) after amalgamation of the SWR. The Milford Railway was purchased by the GWR in 1896 for £50 10s 0d per cent.

The natural harbour at Milford Haven was satisfactory at first, but it was restricted in size, and in 1860 the Milford Haven Docks and Railway Company was authorised (on 23 July), to build a pier at Noyes Point, nearly two miles east of Milford Haven, and a railway to connect it at Milford Haven. The works evidently proceeded slowly for it opened on 18 January 1882, after several acts authorising extension of time. It was leased to the contractor Samuel Lake and Company; Lake had extensive involvement locally at this time. He sub-let the line to the Milford Haven estate, but it was worked by the GWR. In 1921 it became privately controlled, and Awdry, writing in 1990, said that "it still is". However the pier is, as of 2016 derelict and the railway connection is long since gone.

=== Amalgamation of the South Wales Railway with the GWR 1862 ===
The construction of the West Midland Railway and the laying of narrow gauge rails into Paddington station caused the GWR to consider amalgamation with the WMR, and negotiations with the South Wales Railway were opened up as well. These went well, and the unsatisfactory hybrid working arrangement was replaced by a conventional lease at a rent of £170,000 per annum from 1 January 1862, from which date the SWR was for all practical purposes part of the GWR system. SWR proprietors were guaranteed 3 1/4 per cent on their capital.

Amalgamation was authorised by the Great Western Railway (South Wales Amalgamation) Act 1863 (26 & 27 Vict. c. cxlix) of 21 July 1863, to come into effect on 1 August 1863.

== Carmarthen and Cardigan Railway ==
On 7 August 1854, the Carmarthen and Cardigan Railway obtained an act of Parliament, the Carmarthen and Cardigan Railway Act 1854 (17 & 18 Vict. c. ccxviii), giving authorisation to build a line to Cardigan from a junction with the South Wales Railway at Carmarthen. It was to be a broad gauge line, and a new Carmarthen station closer to the town than the SWR station was to be constructed. The company found it difficult to raise money for construction, and at first was only able to open from the SWR as far as its own Carmarthen station: this section was opened on 1 March 1860; the SWR Carmarthen station was renamed Carmarthen Junction. The C&CR extended a further 6 miles to Conwil on 3 September 1860.

The C&CR was worked by GWR engines, and it was immediately unprofitable, closing on 31 December 1860. It reopened on 12 August 1861 and opened an extension to Pencader on 28 March 1864 and to Llandyssul on 3 June 1864. It never made any further progress during its independent existence, and its own traffic was never busy.

== Llanelly Railway and the Vale of Towy ==
The Llanelly Railway and Dock Company had reached the Amman Valley and had a branch to Cross Hands on Mynydd Mawr. In addition, from May 1850 it was running passenger trains between Duffryn and Pontardulais, with omnibus connections at each end forming a multi-modal through service between Llandeilo and Swansea. It continued to aspire towards a northwards extension, connecting with other lines that were extending southwards from the industrial north-west of England.

By 1853, the company's financial situation had improved sufficiently for it to obtain an act of Parliament, the Llanelly Railway and Dock Act 1853 (16 & 17 Vict. c. clxix) giving authorisation to extend the line from Duffryn to Llandilo. The extension was opened as a narrow (standard) gauge line on 24 January 1857.

Meanwhile, another company, the Vale of Towy Railway, had obtained its authorising act of Parliament, the Vale of Towy Railway Act 1854 (17 & 18 Vict. c. cl), on 10 July 1854 for a line from Llandovery to Llandilo. Capital was £55,000 and mixed gauge track was authorised, as sale to the Great Western Railway or its allies was anticipated. The line was opened to passengers on 1 April 1858, but goods trains had already been running for a few weeks. The line was just over 11 miles long. The Vale of Towy company did not run its own trains; it was worked by the Llanelly company.

The Central Wales Railway was authorised on 13 August 1859 to build southwards from Craven Arms, near Shrewsbury, to Llandrindod Wells; it opened its line on 10 October 1865. A further link in the chain was the Central Wales Extension Railway, authorised on 3 July 1860 to build from Llandrindod Wells to Llandovery; construction proved difficult and time consuming, but it eventually opened throughout to reach Llandovery on 8 October 1868.

This completed a through narrow (standard) gauge route from Llanelly to the north-west of England. The Central Wales Extension Railway and the Central Wales Railway were friendly to the London and North Western Railway, and in fact were absorbed by the LNWR in 1868. The Llanelly Railway had hoped that the South Wales Railway or the Great Western Railway would purchase its line, but that was refused, and the rival LNWR gained a territorial advantage in the process.

== Manchester and Milford Railway ==
The idea of connecting the industrial north west of England to West Wales had been shared by other groups of promoters, and in 1860 the Manchester and Milford Railway was authorised. Originally it had been intended to build all or most of the way between Manchester and the waterway at Milford Haven. Delay in getting financial support eroded that grand idea, and it was now truncated to connect Llanidloes and Pencader. At Llanidloes it was to connect with the Llanidloes and Newtown Railway, giving access, it was hoped, to a chain of other lines reaching Manchester.

At the southern end at Pencader, it would connect with the Carmarthen and Cardigan Railway, and somehow gain westward access to Milford Haven. This was to be 51 miles of line through remote and wild country, with limited intermediate business and with no firm commitments at the ends for onward connections. As an afterthought there was to be a branch to Aberystwyth. The line was to be narrow (standard) gauge, and proposed share capital was £555,000. The Manchester and Milford Railway Act 1860 (23 & 24 Vict. c. clxxv) compelled the Carmarthen and Cardigan Railway to lay a third rail to enable the passage of M&MR narrow (standard) gauge trains to Carmarthen from Pencader.

In fact, it was realised during construction that the original route to Llanidloes was impracticable, and in 1865 the M&MR obtained an act of Parliament, the Manchester and Milford Railway Act 1865 (28 & 29 Vict. c. cccv), giving authorisation to make the Aberystwyth line the main line, abandoning the Llanidloes route.

Still desperately short of money, the M&MR opened its first section from Pencader to Lampeter on 1 January 1866. The C&CR had not laid the necessary third rail for through running, and for several months the break of gauge was an obstacle. The M&MR instructed its own contractor to lay the rail, and M&MR goods trains ran through to Carmarthen over the C&CR from 1 November 1866; passenger train operation commenced on 1 November 1867.

Meanwhile, the M&MR had been building northwards, and opened its own line as far as Strata Florida (the railway location was known locally as Ystrad Meurig at first) for goods trains by the end of August 1866. The entire route of 41 miles to Aberystwyth was opened throughout on 12 August 1867. At first the service was operated by the contractors, using three Sharp, Stewart locomotives.

== Llanelly Railway extensions to Swansea and Carmarthen ==
Through the 1850s, Swansea had been growing in importance as an industrial centre, and its docks had been considerably extended and modernised. Meanwhile, Llanelly Dock had stagnated, and shippers increasingly turned away from it. The Swansea Vale extension line to Brynamman gave easy railway access to Swansea. The Llanelly company decided it had to make a connection to Swansea and also to Carmarthen, which would give access to the West Wales harbours.

The company had little chance of raising the money for these lines itself, and in October 1860 the directors negotiated with financiers who, they hoped, would provide the money for the new lines. Almost immediately the financial partners proved to be insubstantial, and the arrangement collapsed. Anxious to revive the scheme, the Llanelly Company now courted the London and North Western Railway, which (through the Central Wales companies) had reached Llandovery and naturally sought access to south and west Wales.

On 1 August 1860, the Llanelly Railway (New Lines) Act 1860 obtained royal assent, authorising a branch line from Llandilo to join the Carmarthen and Cardigan Railway near Carmarthen, and another line from Pontardulais to Swansea through Dunvant. The act also restructured the Company into the "Original Line" and the "New Lines": a change that was to have a serious unforeseen effect.

The Carmarthen line opened to regular passenger service on 1 June 1865, followed by goods trains on 8 or 14 November 1865.

The Swansea section opened on 9 November 1865 to mineral traffic started on the Swansea line, although volumes were small at first. The failure of the financing scheme had forced the Llanelly company into borrowing at high rates of interest. Moreover, the poor income on the Carmarthen line further reduced the Company's trading situation. The New Lines section of the Llanelly Company, which was separately financed, was plunged into financial difficulty, and it went into administration in January 1867.

Passenger operation on the Swansea line started on 14 December 1867. The first through train from Llandovery to Swansea ran on 1 January 1868. The Penclawdd branch from Gower Road at the same time to serve local collieries (and later the Elba steel works).

The construction of the new lines obliged the Llanelly company to borrow large sums of money at crippling interest rates, and it was soon in a desperate financial situation. In July 1867 Richard Moon of the LNWR visited and discussed the possibility of help from his company; in exchange they would get running powers over the Llanelly network. The lease of the Vale of Towy line to the Llanelly company was due to be renegotiated, and the LNWR jointly took on the new lease with the Llanelly Company; the LNWR paid off some of the Llanelly's debts, and secured the running powers, getting LNWR access to Swansea and Carmarthen.

The Llanelly's New Lines Company was in receivership, being unable to service its debts, and the New Lines were rescued by being worked by the LNWR from 1 July 1871. The Great Western Railway was alarmed that the LNWR now had access to Swansea, and quickly took steps to take over the Llanelly company's Original Lines from 1 January 1873. Thus the Llanelly company ceased to control its network: the LNWR had acquired the New Lines and the GWR controlled the Original Lines. The lease of the Vale of Towy Railway was joint between the LNWR and the GWR, and it was converted to full joint ownership by the GWR and LNWR by act of Parliament of 28 July 1884. The Llanelly Company, now only the owner, but not operator, of the Original Lines, was fully absorbed by the GWR 1 July 1889.

== Pembroke and Tenby Railway ==
In 1858, the South Wales Railway had been released from its obligation to build a branch line to Pembroke. Local people were disappointed at this, and they determined to build their own line from Pembroke Dockyard to Tenby. The Pembroke and Tenby Railway Act 1859 (22 & 23 Vict. c. vi) obtained royal assent on 21 July 1859, incorporating the South Wales, Pembroke and Tenby Junction Railway. It was to be a narrow (standard) gauge line, incompatible with the broad gauge of the South Wales Railway. In 1861, the company changed its name to the Pembroke and Tenby Railway. The line opened on 30 July 1863, and was worked by contractors.

While this was a useful start, it was obvious that an isolated line was of limited value. As a narrow (standard) gauge line the P&TR regarded the South Wales Railway (by now part of the Great Western Railway) as unfriendly, and it sought to connect with the other narrow gauge lines at Carmarthen. The Pembroke and Tenby Railway (Extension) Act 1864 (27 & 28 Vict. c.clxxxiii) of 17 July 1864 authorised an extension from Tenby to Whitland, and also a west curve at Carmarthen, allowing through running from Whitland into Carmarthen Town to meet the Manchester and Milford Railway there. Capital for the work was set at £200,000.

The Whitland extension was opened to the public on 4 September 1866; there was a separate station at Whitland, alongside the Great Western Railway station. However the means of running from Whitland to Carmarthen required the Great Western Railway to alter its broad gauge track to mixed gauge, to enable the running of the P&TR trains; the GWR did not hasten to facilitate this incursion, and the P&TR directors considered building an independent line from Whitland to Carmarthen, and obtained the Pembroke and Tenby Railway Act 1866 (29 & 30 Vict. c. cccxxx).

This would have given the P&TR unrestricted access to the standard gauge lines at Carmarthen. As these were friendly to the rival London and North Western Railway, this had the potential to admit the LNWR to the West Wales area, an extremely unwelcome outcome for the GWR. At length it agreed to give the necessary access over its own route, by converting the up line between Whitland and Carmarthen to narrow gauge, leaving the down line broad: there were thus two single lines side by side. This was the first occasion when any GWR broad gauge track was converted to narrow.

The Pembroke and Tenby Railway ran its first goods trains to Carmarthen on 1 June 1868, and passenger services started in August 1869.

In May 1872, the GWR altered the track gauge of its lines in South Wales to standard gauge, and this eliminated the benefit of the P&TR running independent trains between Whitland and Carmarthen. From 1 August 1872, P&TR coaches were attached to GWR trains at Whitland; these trains called at Carmarthen Junction and were detached there and worked forward to Carmarthen Town station.

The Pembroke and Tenby Railway was leased by the GWR on 1 July 1896 and finally absorbed by it a year later.

== Gwendreath Valleys Railway ==
In 1864, the impecunious Carmarthen and Cardigan Railway promoted two branch lines from Kidwelly, and one, known as the Lime Line was authorised by an act of Parliament, the Carmarthen and Cardigan Railway (Kidwelly Branch) Act 1864 (27 & 28 Vict. c. xiii) of 28 April 1864. The C&CR hoped to attract investment for the construction, but it was disappointed, and the powers were transferred to the Gwendreath Valleys Railway by an act of Parliament, the Gwendreath Valleys Railway Act 1866 (29 & 30 Vict. c. ccxcvii), of 30 July 1866. This new concern opened a short length of the Lime Line from Kidwelly to Mynydd-y-Garreg in 1868; the line was broad gauge.

After a period of dormancy, the Gwendreath Valleys Railway was reopened in 1872 as a standard gauge line. The short line was worked by the neighbouring Burry Port and Gwendraeth Valley Railway by agreement of 30 November 1876.

== Burry Port and Gwendraeth Valley Railway ==
The Kidwelly and Llanelly Canal and Tramroad Company operated a canal serving collieries; the tramways were short branches of the canal serving pits nearby. It saw that its canal was obsolescent and it obtained the Kidwelly and Burry Port Railway Act 1865 (28 & 29 Vict. c. ccxviii) on 5 July 1865 to convert the canal to a railway. It was to be called the Kidwelly and Burry Port Railway Company, but in 1866 it merged with the Burry Port Harbour Company and changed the name to the Burry Port and Gwendreath Valley Railway. (The spelling "Gwendreath" was an error by the company's parliamentary legal advisors.)

The conversion was completed and the line was opened as far as Pontyberem on 23 June 1869. The short Carway branch opened about the end of 1870 and that to the Star Colliery at Trimsaran followed in June 1872. The main line was completed to the foot of the Hirwaen Isaf incline, a mile short of Cwm Mawr in 1870.

For many years, there was no passenger service on the BP&GV line, but about the end of 1898 a workmen's service started to run, from Burry Port and calling at Trimsaran Road bridge at Morfa, and later from Tycoch Junction where the Gwendraeth Valley line connected.

== Whitland and Taf Vale Railway ==
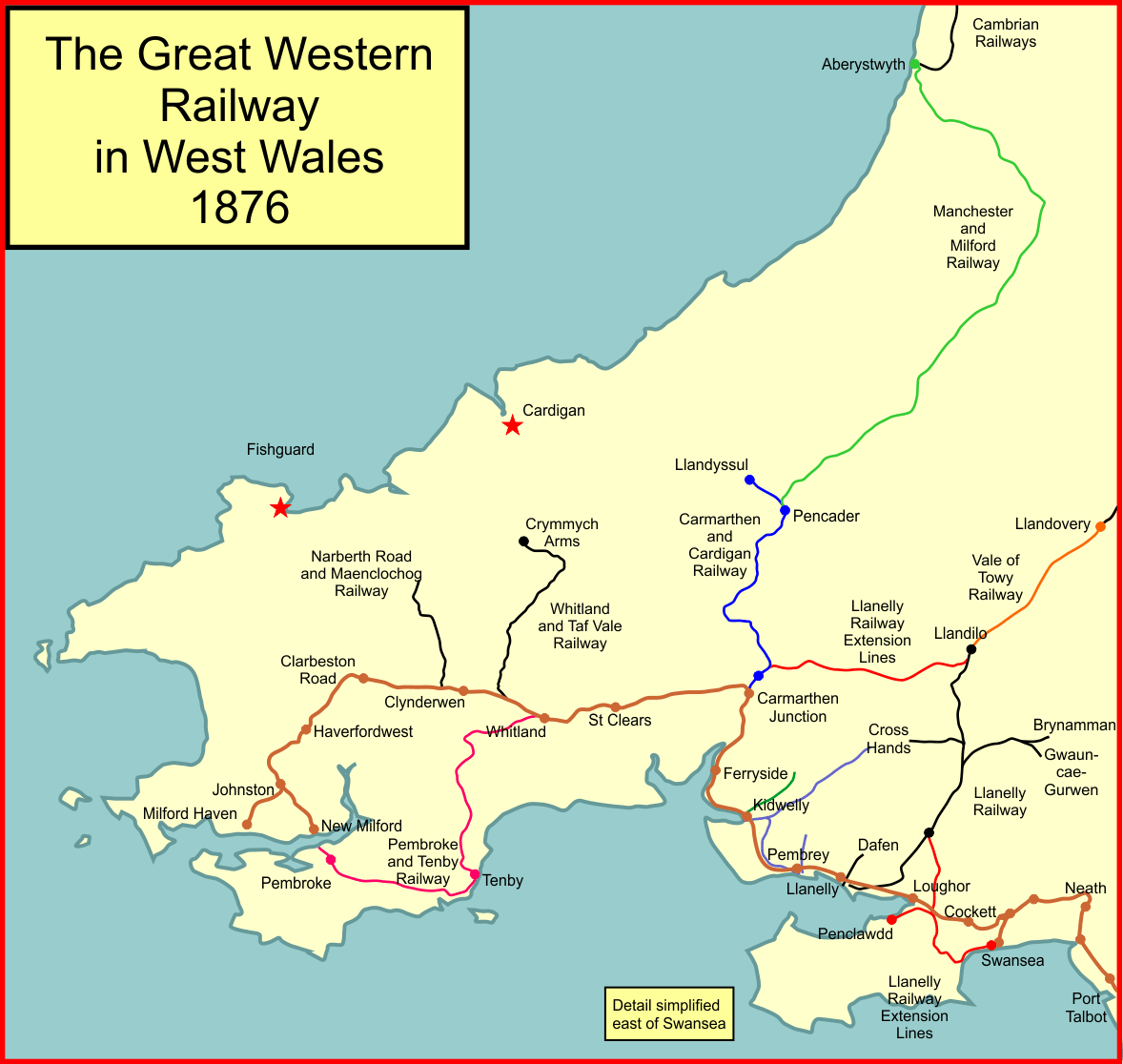
Railways in West Wales in 1876

John Owen was the operator of a slate quarry at Glogue, north of Whitland; he formed an alliance with an engineer, James W. Szlumper to form a standard gauge railway connection from Glogue down to the main line at Whitland. A standard gauge line was contemplated, although the GWR main line was still broad gauge. The Taf Vale was friendly with the Pembroke and Tenby Railway, which had an act of Parliament giving approval to build from Whitland to Carmarthen. The Taf Vale promoters hoped that this might give them a standard gauge outlet.

On 12 July 1869, the Whitland and Taf Vale Railway obtained its authorising act of Parliament, the Whitland and Taf Vale Railway Act 1869 (32 & 33 Vict. c. xci), with capital of £37,000. (Note: The Taf Vale is unconnected with the Taff Vale Railway in the Cardiff area.)

The line was opened as far as Glogue to goods and minerals trains on 24 March 1873. By this time the former South Wales Railway main line had been converted to standard gauge, so the issue of mixed gauge track to Whitland station no longer applied. On 29 April 1873, the board decided to proceed with construction to Crymmych by directly employed labour, and the short extension opened early in July 1874. The line was opened to passengers on 12 July 1875. There was a connecting road service to Cardigan and to Newport.

== GWR gauge conversion ==
The inconvenience of the break of gauge between broad gauge and narrow gauge lines was becoming more marked over time, and in 1871 the Great Western Railway decided to convert the gauge of all the broad gauge track in Wales. The work was executed in April 1872. On the night of Tuesday 30 April, the up line from New Milford and Grange Court was closed, and single-line working of a reduced train service instituted on the down line. Considerable technical preparation had been made including oiling and freeing of the bolts; much of the track was the GWR pattern longitudinal timber track, but some Barlow rail sections had been replaced with rails on cross sleepers, and because of the use of fang bolts this was much more laborious to convert.

The up line was ready for narrow gauge traffic on 12 May, and all broad gauge rolling stock was cleared from the Welsh lines; this included the Carmarthen and Cardigan Railway, and an inspector was sent to verify that this had been done. The reduced train service was operated over the single up line, and sidings at certain stations had been previously narrowed to allow passenger trains to be shunted to pass opposing trains, as there was no ordinary crossing loop for a few days. During this time, goods trains were not run on the line under conversion, but as far as possible goods traffic was worked by alternative routes where they were available east of Swansea.

Conversion of the down line was complete on 22 May, and the following day a skeleton service was run at reduced speed. Private owners' broad gauge wagons were returned to their home stations; in many cases there was not enough siding accommodation for them, and they were turned off the line as close to the home as possible.

Following the gauge conversion, the opportunity was taken to enlarge the facilities at the cramped Neyland site; considerable removal of rock was necessary to make the space, and the new layout was commissioned in 1876.

== From Narberth Road to Goodwick ==
In 1871, Edward Cropper and Joseph Babington Macaulay obtained a Board of Trade certificate to build a standard gauge line from a slate quarry at Rosebush, about 8 miles north of Narberth Road station on the South Wales Railway main line. The line was named the Narberth Road and Maenclochog Railway, and it opened in January 1876, and from September 1876 passengers were carried. The business was not profitable, and the railway closed at the end of 1882, but it was reopened in December 1884, closing once again in 1888.

In 1878, it had been thought that the way to achieve profitability was to link to Fishguard Bay, and in that year the Rosebush and Fishguard Railway was authorised, to build from Rosebush to Goodwick; the reference to Fishguard is to the bay; the settlement named Fishguard is at the south-eastern end of Fishguard Bay, and Goodwick is at the north-western end; it was to Goodwick that the line was directed. It proved impossible to raise the money to build the line, but the scheme was revived in 1884, with the same result, and again in 1886 also failed. In 1891 a Colonel Joseph Okell stepped in with his personal money, but in January 1894 he was declared bankrupt.

== Llanelly and Mynydd Mawr Railway ==
The idea of building a standard gauge line from Llanelly to Mynydd Mawr was revived in 1872; volumes of mineral extraction had increased and enhanced transport from the collieries to the quay at Llanelly was highly desirable. The Llanelly and Mynydd Mawr Railway was authorised by act of Parliament, the Llanelly and Mynydd Mawr Railway Act 1875 (38 & 39 Vict. c. clxiv), on 19 July 1875, with share capital of £60,000. The new line was to be 13 miles in length, approaching Llanelly harbour from the north west, and crossing the South Wales Railway main line by a bridge.

Raising the capital to build the line was extremely difficult, and the company was on the point of abandoning the scheme in October 1879. However at the last moment it was decided to continue, and the contractor John Waddell agreed to construct the line, taking a large proportion of his price in shares in the company. He started work on 26 April 1880, and in January 1881 he agreed to work the line for five years, for 70% of gross receipts in year 1, then 60%, then 50% in subsequent years.

The line was opened on 1 January 1883 although some mineral and excursion traffic appears to have run before that date. Regular public passenger services were never run on the line, although colliers' trains were operated at the turn of the century. Two steam locomotives were in use from the beginning. For some years the profitability of the company was poor, but Waddell opened a new mine on the line in 1887, and traffic improved considerably.

The harbour at Llanelly used by the line was prone to silting, and as the mineral trade increased, and the size of shipping also grew, reducing the attractiveness of Llanelly Harbour; many companies transferred their business to more modern facilities at Swansea.

In 1896, the harbour commissioners obtained an the Llanelly Harbour Act 1896 (59 & 60 Vict. c. clxxxvi) giving powers to extend and improve the harbour by the construction of a North Dock. This opened in December 1903, special arrangements being made to carry the L&MMR line across the mouth of the entrance by a swing bridge.

== Whitland and Cardigan Railway ==
The Whitland and Taf Vale Railway saw that Cardigan was important commercial centre and close enough to build a connecting line. On 2 August 1877, the company obtained royal assent for the Whitland and Taf Vale (Cardigan Extension) Railway Act 1877 (40 & 41 Vict. c. clxxxv) giving it powers to do so, and it changed its name to the Whitland and Cardigan Railway. Construction was slow due to a shortage of subscriptions for shares, and difficulty in obtaining necessary land. Opening took place at last on 1 September 1886; the Great Western Railway worked the line from the outset.

Absorption by the Great Western Railway was on the agenda as the next step, and this was authorised by a section of the Great Western Railway Act 1890, dated 4 August, taking retrospective effect from 1 July 1890. The line was now simply the Cardigan branch of the GWR.

== Fishguard Bay Railway and Pier Company ==
The concept of reaching Fishguard Bay continued to be attractive as a financial speculation, and Joseph Rowlands, a Birmingham solicitor, and James Cartland, an industrialist, together acquired a majority shareholding in the uncompleted North Pembrokeshire and Fishguard Railway Company. They obtained a fresh act of Parliament, the Fishguard Bay Railway and Pier Act 1893 (56 & 57 Vict. c. xcvii), on 29 June 1893 to incorporate the Fishguard Bay Railway and Pier Company. This was authorised to extend from the intended terminal of the North Pembrokeshire line, to Goodwick. A pier or breakwater was to be constructed as well as a hotel, and running powers over the North Pembrokeshire line were granted. The company's capital was to be £120,000.

The Waterford and Wexford Railway was engaged in improving the harbour facilities at Rosslare, (formerly known as Greenore or Ballygeary and negotiations took place to combine the activities on both sides of the ferry crossing. This culminated in the incorporation of the Fishguard and Rosslare Railways and Harbours Company by the Fishguard and Rosslare Railways and Harbours Act 1894 (57 & 58 Vict. c. cxxxvii) of 31 July 1894.

Rowlands and Cartland purchased the derelict Maenclochog Railway in 1894 for £50,000. The line was in a very poor state of repair, and much had to be done in the way of improvements, but goods traffic started on 13 March 1895 followed by passenger trains on 11 April 1895. There were five up and four down passenger trains daily to and from the end of the line at Letterston, with a coach connection from Goodwick.

Rowlands now approached the Great Western Railway, intending to sell his Welsh network to the GWR. The original Maenclochog line was very inadequately engineered for operation by the larger company, and included a gradient of 1 in 27, and Rowlands' approach was unsuccessful.

He next promoted a bill in Parliament to build a line from the Maenclochog line to Carmarthen, where a connection with the rival London and North Western Railway would be possible. The bill was passed in 1895 and Rowlands prepared plans for further schemes including a line to Swansea, and in 1896 to Aberdare and make junctions with the LNWR, the Midland Railway and the GWR en route; sale to any of those railways was now a theoretical possibility.

The Great Western Railway had long considered revival of the original South Wales Railway's scheme to reach Fishguard Bay securing a share of the transatlantic shipping trade. The possibility of the LNWR acquiring access to the West Wales network motivated the GWR to step in; it acquired control of the North Pembrokeshire and Fishguard Railway in February 1898.

In May 1898, an agreement was concluded between the GWR, the Great Southern and Western Railway in Ireland, and the Fishguard and Rosslare Railways and Harbours Company: the Fishguard and Rosslare would complete the harbours in both places, and would build a railway from Rosslare to Waterford, linking in to the Irish railway network; and it would provide steamers. The GS&WR would work the necessary connecting railways on the Irish side; and the GWR undertook to make a new line from Clarbeston Road to Fishguard Harbour, and work the Welsh railways. The GWR was also obliged to provide "an effective steamboat service" between Waterford and Milford or Fishguard, in addition to the Rosslare service.

The agreement was ratified by the North Pembrokeshire and Fishguard Railway Act 1899 (62 & 63 Vict. c. xlviii), and the acquisition by the GWR of the North Pembrokeshire line was included. On 1 July 1899 the GWR opened the extension from Letterston to Goodwick (later named Fishguard and Goodwick) station. The Fishguard and Rosslare Railways and Harbours Company became a joint enterprise of the GWR and the GS&WR. The company had considerable construction obligations on the Irish side.

== Fishguard Harbour ==
Although Fishguard Bay had been reached, there was not a satisfactory harbour there, and the railway approach was still over the very steeply graded Rosebush line. The town of Fishguard is at the south-east end of Fishguard Bay, but the new terminus was to be on the north-west side, where it is sheltered by hills up to 300 feet high. There were sheer cliffs there and it was necessary to blast a terrace for the harbour works. Together with reclamation by tipping the excavated rock into the sea, an area of twenty-seven acres was made available for quay 1,120 feet long, and the new railway station. A breakwater, 2,000 feet long, 300 feet wide at the base and 70 at the top, and 80 feet tall, was formed. More than two million tons of rock was excavated.

Considerable numbers of houses were constructed by the GWR to accommodate staff, as the small local communities had not enough housing for the large terminal activity.

On 30 August 1906, the promised new route was opened: from Clarbeston Road (on the Neyland line) to Letterston Junction (on the North Pembroke line), as well as an extension from the Goodwick terminus to Fishguard Harbour. The ferry service between Fishguard Harbour and Rosslare was started at the same time. The new line was 11 miles in length with a steepest gradient of 1 in 108, but two miles of the former North Pembrokeshire line between Letterston and Goodwick were at 1 in 50. The Clarbeston Road and Letterston Railway had cost £215,801.

Three new turbine steamers, St. George, St. David, and St. Patrick, each of approximately 2,500 gross tons and capable of 22 1/2 knots, were provided for the new service; the crossing time was three hours for a 54-mile passage. A fourth vessel, St. Andrew, was added two years later. Day and night train services were established in each direction, the boat trains being allowed 5 1/2 hours for the 261 miles between Paddington and Fishguard Harbour. The journey time from London to Cork was 13 hours (allowing for the 25-minute difference in time observed until 1915).

The run from Paddington to Fishguard was covered without a stop several times each way in September and October 1907 by London and Killarney Day Excursion trains in a little less than five hours, the longest non-stop run ever made on the Great Western.

At first, a single line section was operated at Treffgarne and through Spittal Tunnel as the excavation for double track had not been completed. This was finalised on 17 December 1906 when ordinary double-line working was instituted throughout the new line. The section from Manorowen to Goodwick, on the original North Pembrokeshire line, was doubled on 5 May 1907.

"New Milford" resumed its proper name of Neyland, and the ferry activity there ceased, as the Waterford service was diverted to Fishguard from September 1906, mainly carrying cattle and goods.

Towards 1909, the steamer traffic between Great Britain and America became increasingly competitive, and the traditional use of Liverpool was questioned, if a shorter crossing time could be achieved elsewhere. White Star liners had started to use Holyhead, and the Cunard Company arranged to land its passengers at Fishguard, forty miles nearer New York and within five hours of London.

The first ship to call was the Mauretania, then the biggest and fastest liner afloat. Having left New York at 10 am on 25 August and called at Queenstown (now Cobh), she dropped anchor at Fishguard at 1:15 pm on the 30th. The mails and passengers were in London by 8 o'clock, the mails at 6:40. Early in 1910, the time was further reduced by the omission of the Queenstown call, and the Cunard liners continued to use Fishguard regularly from 6 to 8 times a month until the outbreak of World War I, three or four special trains to London usually being run off each boat.

The frequent "ordinary" special mail and passenger trains usually did the journey from Fishguard to London in about 4 1/2 hours with a stop at Cardiff.

Reliance on the difficult North Pembrokeshire route between Fishguard and Letterston Junction was seen as a serious limitation, and in 1903 a new route on an improved alignment with easier gradients was designed. This would have been hugely expensive, and the GWR board waited to see how successful the Fishguard route was to be. Its success as an ocean terminal prompted the GWR to start construction. Progress was slow, and in fact World War I intervened and the work was never completed. (Note: The abandoned earthworks may be discerned in aerial mapping, heading due north from Letterston Junction.)

On the outbreak of World War I, it was inevitable that the transatlantic trade would be suspended, and the last such call was made when the Lusitania left on 14 September 1914.

== Grouping of the railways ==
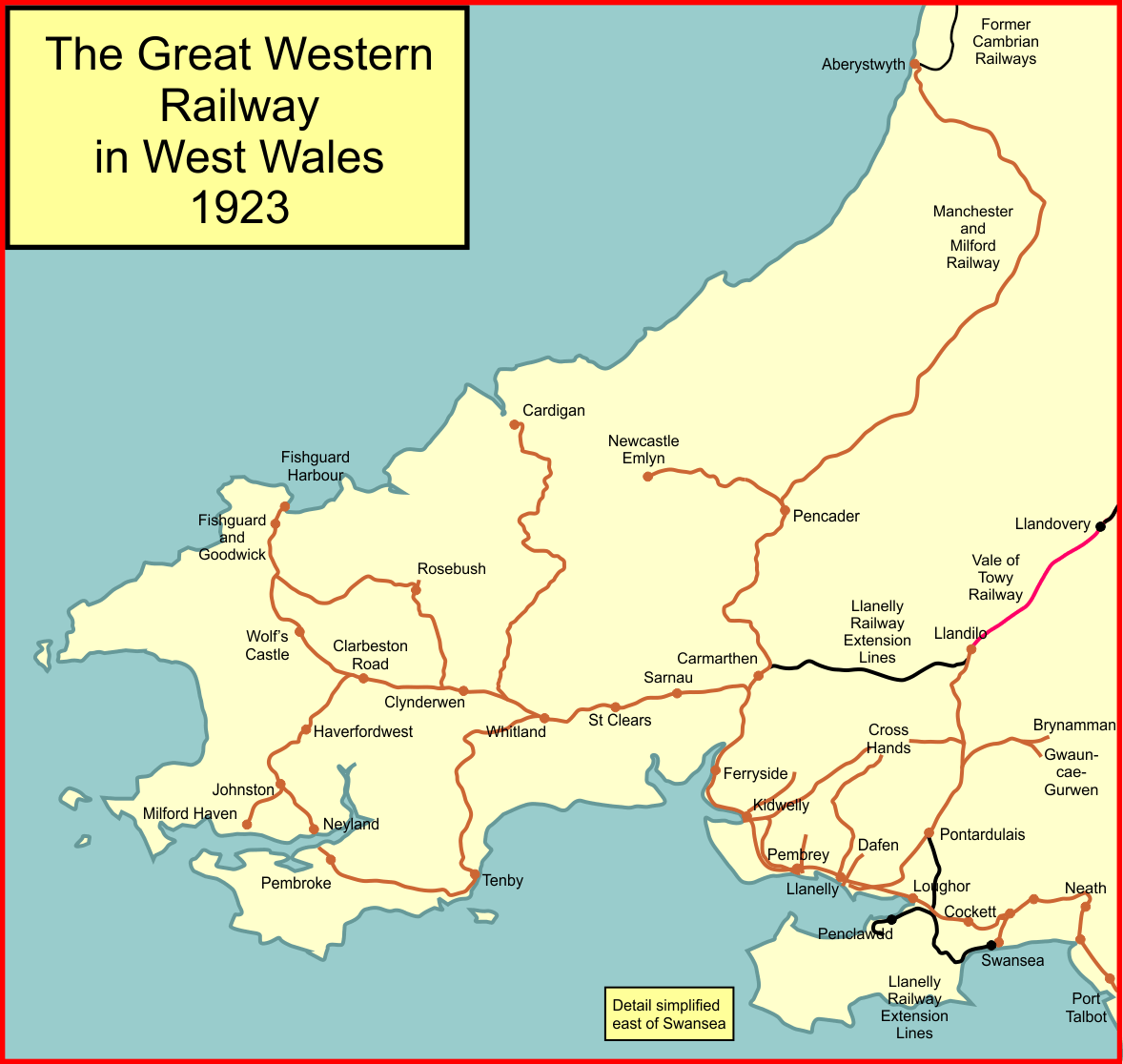
Railway lines in West Wales in 1923

The Railways Act 1921 required that the main line railways of Great Britain should be "grouped" into four larger units; three of these were new entities, but the Great Western Railway was dominant in its area, and absorbed a large number of small concerns, the name Great Western Railway continuing in use. (Outside the area under consideration, several other railways were constituents of the post-1923 GWR.) The London and North Western Railway and the Midland Railway were constituents of the new London Midland and Scottish Railway (LMS). The grouping took place at the beginning of 1923.

Thus in 1922, the railways in the area under consideration were:

=== Railways already acquired or built by the Great Western Railway ===
- The original South Wales Railway main line, Gloucester to Neyland; amalgamated with the GWR in 1863;
- The Milford Railway from Johnston to Milford Haven, purchased by the GWR in 1896;
- The line from Letterston to Goodwick, opened by the GWR in 1899;
- The new main line from Clarbeston Road to Goodwick, opened by the GWR in 1906;
- The Llanelly Railway and Dock Company; the original network, between Llanelly and Llandeilo had been absorbed by the GWR in 1873;
- The Carmarthen and Cardigan Railway: open from Carmarthen to Llandyssil only, and absorbed by the GWR in 1892; it had been extended by the GWR itself to Newcastle Emlyn, opening in 1895;
- The Rosebush line; the Maenclochog Railway and the North Pembrokeshire and Fishguard Railway had been acquired by the GWR in 1898.
- The Whitland and Cardigan Railway; the Company had been absorbed by the GWR in 1890.
- The Pembroke and Tenby Railway; from Whitland to Pembroke Dock, the company had been amalgamated with the GWR in 1897.
- Burry Port and Gwendraeth Valley Railway; sold to the GWR in 1922;
- Manchester and Milford Railway: Pencader Junction to Aberystwyth; absorbed by the GWR in 1911.

=== Joint lines ===
- The Fishguard and Rosslare Harbours company was already vested jointly in the GWR and the GS&WR.

=== Independent lines at Grouping ===
- The Llanelly and Mynydd Mawr Railway was independent until the Grouping process, when it was absorbed by the Great Western Railway. In its final year of independence in 1922 the L&MMR paid a dividend of 6% on its ordinary share capital of £59,300.
- The short Gwendreath Valleys Railway; owned by the Kidwelly Tinplate Company.
- The extension lines of the Llanelly Railway and Dock Company (Llandeilo Junction to Gwili Junction and Pontardulais to Swansea) were in the hands of the LNWR.
- The Vale of Towy Railway had been vested in the GWR and the LNWR jointly in 1884, and at the Grouping the joint ownership transferred to the GWR and the LMS jointly.

== After 1923 ==
From the end of World War I, the political situation in Ireland was dominated by the Irish War of Independence, and by the summer of 1921 it had drifted into a situation little short of civil war. As a result, traffic on the Fishguard to Rosslare route had fallen to a fraction of its former volume. The treaty of 6 December 1921 formally ended the hostilities, although outbreaks of violence continued; nevertheless matters seemed to be moving towards stability by the summer of 1923.

The Irish Mail service via Fishguard and Rosslare was resumed on 17 September 1923, although through carriages were run from Aldershot to Fishguard, "presumably to facilitate troop movements if necessary".

At the time of the Grouping, the Government had appealed to the railways to undertake as much work as possible for the relief of unemployment, and the GWR proposed a new branch line from Mathry Road, on the Fishguard line, to St Davids, a distance of about ten miles, at a cost of £350,000. (Other lines elsewhere were proposed.) The Company asked for a Government grant, stating that "there appears to be little prospect... of the receipts from the lines being more than sufficient to cover working expenses". Only a tiny population would be benefitted by the line, and the scheme was not progressed further.

The Rosebush line was relaid in 1923, but passenger services stopped in 1937, and the line west of Puncheston closed completely on 3 November 1942; east of that point the line closed on 16 May 1949. (Letterston was served by goods trains until 1 March 1965).

The local production of anthracite on the Mynydd Mawr line fell in the years following 1923, substantially reducing the traffic on the former L&MMR line. Moreover, the size of shipping commonly used increased considerably over this period, and the limitations of sea access for large vessels to Llanelly docks also reduced the activity there.

GWR diesel railcars started operation from Swansea to Whitland in 1936.

== Trecwn depot ==
Passenger services over the Rosebush line had ended in 1937, since when goods services had been progressively truncated. The Army had established a camp at Trecwn during the Boer War, and during World War I the site was converted to an isolation hospital; a siding was laid to enable servicemen to be conveyed by train direct from Fishguard.

In 1938, the site was again made use of, now as a Royal Naval Armaments Depot, and an extensive internal narrow gauge railway system was laid, eventually amounting to over 18 miles in extent. The stub of branch line serving Trecwn and Letterston continued in use until March 1965, when Letterston goods depot closed.

As late as 1962, a workmen's passenger service operated from Fishguard to Trecwn, ending on 3 August that year.

The depot was finally decommissioned in 1996, and the following year the site was purchased by Omega Pacific for industrial use, but rail connection ceased permanently.

== Nationalisation ==
In 1948, the Great Western Railway was nationalised, in common with the other public railways of Great Britain, and the line was now owned by British Railways.

The ownership of the Fishguard and Rosslare Railway and Harbour company thus became joint between British Railways and Córas Iompair Éireann, the latter having been established by the Republic of Ireland's Transport Act 1944. The company owned about 104 miles of railway, of which one mile was in Wales.

By 1950, the L&MMR line crossing the GWR main line was out of use, as sea trade at Llanelly had vanished; onward conveyance of local minerals was now by rail alone.

== Modernisation ==
By the 1960s, British Railways gave more strategic thought to the future; local passenger and goods traffic in rural areas had collapsed, and the coal mining industry was changing considerably, but investment was beginning to be available in new railway equipment. In fact, the first diesel multiple unit stock reached Carmarthen in 1957 and its deployment was much extended from 1959.

== Train service pattern after 1962 ==
In 1962, the Neyland route was still regarded as the main line over Milford Haven. There were eleven passenger services each way west of Carmarthen, of which eight conveyed through carriages from Paddington. Only the Fishguard boat trains had refreshment cars. Four trains conveyed through carriages from Paddington to Pembroke Dock, three to Neyland, two to Milford Haven and three to Fishguard.

One of the Milford Haven trains was formed of a composite sleeper only, attached to the 00:45 newspaper train from Paddington. The Pembroke Coast Express ran to Pembroke Dock and the Capitals United Express ran to Pembroke Dock with a portion for Neyland.

Carmarthen had another nine trains eastward, mostly to Swansea but also to Derby and Birmingham, and a 22:50 to Ferryside, consisting of one coach attached to a parcels train.

A milk train ran daily from Whitland and Carmarthen to Kensington (Olympia) and Wood Lane, and there was a daily fish train from Milford Haven to Severn Tunnel Junction or Carmarthen.

== Line closures, and openings ==
A branch line to the new Gulf Oil refinery at Waterston was opened on 21 August 1960; (Note: The refinery commenced production on 2 November 1960.) it made a junction with the Milford Haven line at Herbrandston Junction. A further branch was opened to a new Amoco refinery at Robeston on 20 February 1974. The Hebrandston branch closed on 10 November 1984.

Passenger services stopped on The Whitland and Cardigan branch on 10 September 1962, followed by freight in 1963. The Cardigan branch closed to passenger traffic on 10 September 1962, and to goods from 27 May 1963. On 6 April 1964, the stopping service from Clarbeston Road to Fishguard ceased.

The line from Johnston to Neyland closed on 14 June 1964. The line had survived until then because of the extensive locomotive and carriage servicing facilities there (from the 1876 expansion), but modern traction enabled the work to be carried out elsewhere, in Swansea and Carmarthen.

Nonetheless, Pembrokeshire was only lightly affected by the 1963 Beeching Report as none of the remaining three branches - to Fishguard, Milford Haven, and Pembroke Dock - were proposed for closure.

The Neyland line reopened briefly from 19 May 1966, because construction materials for oil refinery construction were brought in by rail to Neyland; the work finished and the line closed finally in May 1968.

The line from Clarbeston Road to Fishguard was singled on 17 May 1971.

A Motorail service was established from 19 June 1965, conveying accompanied cars from Fishguard and Goodwick station to London (Kensington Olympia), principally used by customers of the Irish ferry; the service continued in use until 16 September 1982.

The Fishguard and Rosslare Railways and Harbours Company had become jointly owned by CIÉ and British Railways. In January 1979, Sealink UK was established as a subsidiary of British Railways, and Sealink was sold to Sea Containers Limited on 27 July 1984. The Company changed its name and ownership several times, eventually becoming Stena Line. From 1979, Iarnród Éireann was established as a subsidiary of CIÉ, so that Stena Line and IÉ were the joint owners of F&RR&H, which remains the position to the present day (2015).

Both curves at Carmarthen leading to the station were singled in 1985.

In 1986, the line through Gowerton was singled between Cockett West and Duffryn West (approaching Llanelli) as part of the Swansea multiple aspect signalling scheme. With the increase in train frequency in subsequent years the single-track section had become an operational difficulty, and double track was reinstated on 8 April 2013.

== Topography ==
Easy gradients from Carmarthen but after Sarnau the gradient steepens against westbound trains, then drops to St Clears and Whitland. After Cardigan Junction the gradient steepens to 1 in 101 against westbound trains; approaching Clarbeston Road the gradient falls. Approaching Haverfordwest and beyond it numerous reverse curves and changes of gradient, the double track ends at Johnston, only six intermediate stations to Johnston.

Neyland line falls continuously at up to 1 in 75. Milford Haven branch also falls continuously, both branches originally intended to be double track but remained single.

=== South Wales Railway main line ===
- Milford Haven; opened 15 April 1856; renamed Neyland 1859; renamed New Milford later in 1859; renamed Neyland 1906; closed 15 June 1964;
- Johnston; opened 15 April 1856; sometimes Milford Road in nearly days; still open;
- Haverfordwest; opened 2 January 1854; still open;
- Clarbeston Road Junction;
- Clarbeston Road; opened 2 January 1854; may have been Cross Inn initially; relocated a short distance to the west 27 July 1914; still open;
- Cardigan Junction; convergence of Cardigan line;
- Narberth Road; opened 2 January 1854; renamed Clynderwen 1875; renamed Clunderwen 1980; still open;
- Whitland; opened 2 January 1854; still open; convergence of Pembroke and Tenby line;
- St Clears; opened 2 January 1854; closed 15 June 1964;
- Sarnau; opened July 1888; closed 15 June 1964;
- Carmarthen Bridge Junction; divergence of Carmarthen Loop;
- Carmarthen; opened 11 October 1852; renamed Carmarthen Junction 1860; closed 27 September 1926; convergence of Carmarthen and Cardigan line;
- Ferryside; opened 11 October 1852; still open;
- Kidwelly; opened 11 October 1852; still open;
- Kidwelly Flats Halt; opened 6 August 1941; closed 11 November 1957; unadvertised halt for military depot;
- Pembrey & Burry Port; opened 11 October 1852; still open;
- Llanelly; opened 11 October 1852; renamed Llanelli 1976; still open;
- Loughor; opened 11 October 1852; closed 4 April 1960;
- Gower Road; opened 1 August 1854; renamed Gowerton 1886; renamed Gowerton North 1950; renamed Gowerton 1968; still open;
- Cockett; opened May 1871; closed 15 June 1964;
- Swansea Loop Junction West; Swansea line diverges;
- Landore Junction; converges with main line from Swansea.

=== Milford Haven branch ===
- Milford Haven; opened 7 September 1863; still open;
- Johnston (above).

=== Fishguard extension ===
- Fishguard Harbour; opened 30 August 1906; still open;
- Goodwick; opened 1 August 1899; renamed Fishguard and Goodwick 1904; closed 6 April 1964; workmen's use continued until 3 August 1964; reopened 14 May 2012; still open;
- Jordanston; opened 1 October 1923; closed 6 April 1964;
- Letterston Jn; divergence of North Pembrokeshire line;
- Mathry Road; opened 1 August 1923; closed 6 April 1964;
- Welsh Hook Halt; opened 5 May 1924; closed 6 April 1964;
- Wolf's Castle Halt; opened 1 October 1913; closed 6 April 1964;
- Clarbeston Road Jn; above.

Jordanston and Welsh Hook had very low platforms for use by auto trains.
