= Ty-coch Halt railway station =

Former railway station in Wales

Ty-coch Halt

General information
- Location: Kidwelly, Carmarthenshire; Wales
- Coordinates: 51.7303°N 4.3054°W
- Grid reference: SN408060
- Platforms: 1

Other information
- Status: Disused

History
- Post-grouping: Great Western Railway; British Railways

Key dates
- By September 1927: Station opened
- By May 1949: Station closed
Location

Ty-coch Halt railway station, Ty Coch Halt railway station or Tycoch Halt railway station had been opened by 1927 to passenger services for miners use only. A halt is however marked on the 1913 OS map. It was opened by the Great Western Railway and served the colliers from the Kidwelly area working at the collieries in the Gwendraeth Valley between 1927 and 1949; several basic halts were opened on the Burry Port and Gwendraeth Valley Railway in Carmarthenshire, Wales, however most were also opened to public use.

== History ==
Ty-coch was opened for use by miners by the Great Western Railway on the route of the Burry Port and Gwendraeth Valley Railway on the Kidwelly and Cwmmawr section of the line and was closed by the Great Western Railway by May 1949. It was on the route of the old canal with Kidwelly located to the south and Trimsaran Road to the north.

The railway was originally a freight only line apart from passenger trains for miners, but stations were established due to pressure from the public. The freight service continued for coal traffic until 1996 by which time the last of the local collieries had closed down. The line was carrying traffic from the washeries at Cwmmawr and Carway until closure.

== Infrastructure ==
The halt had a single short platform with a small shelter on the northern side of the line at the dwellings of Ty-coch near Bryn-morfa. Ty-coch Junction stood to the west and several sidings were located on the other side of the road overbridge. A path led down from a gate in the wall of the overbridge. A short siding nearly running up to the overbridge on the north side of the line was present.

The line was partly built on the old Kidwelly and Llanelly Canal however incline planes existed at sites such as Ponthenri.

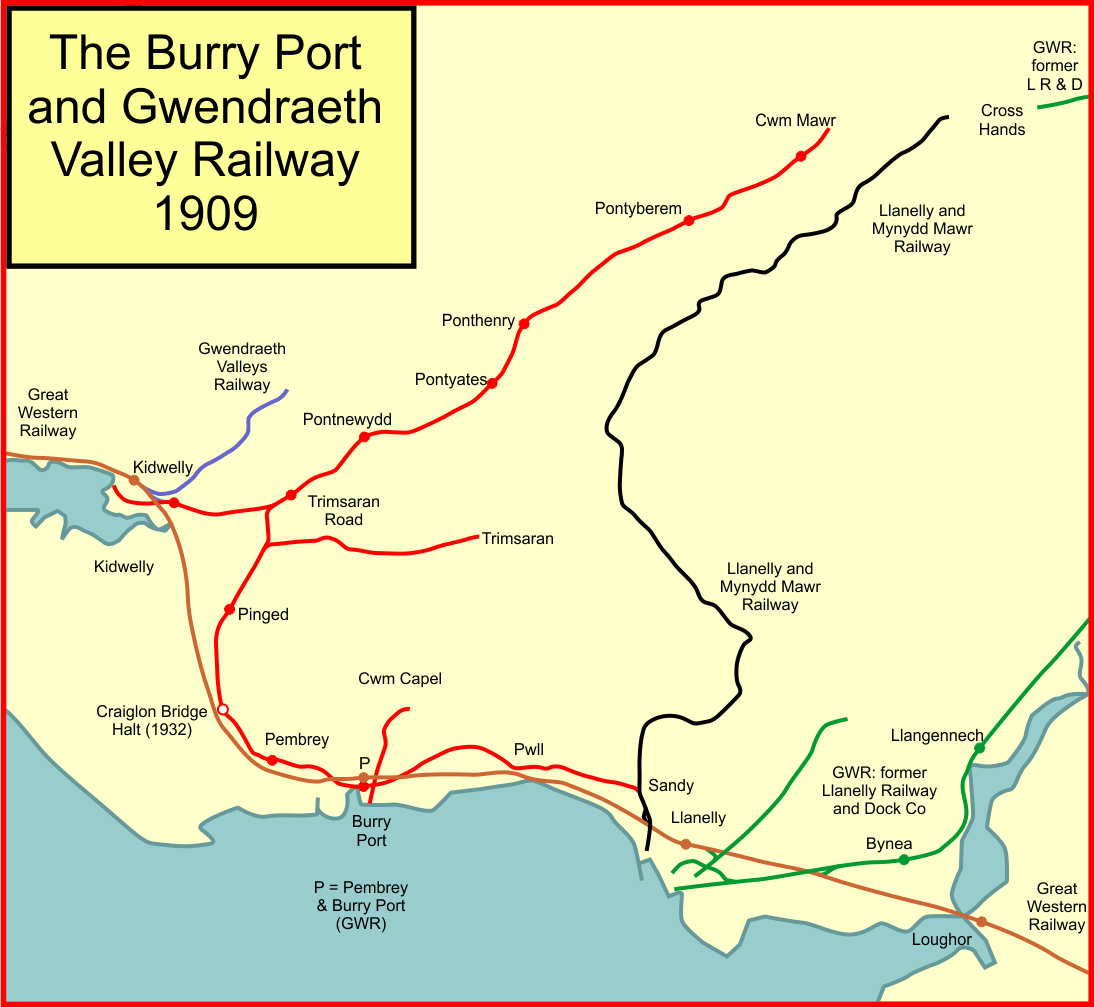
The BP&GVR system in 1909.

== Remnants ==
The section south of Pinged, between Burry Port and Craiglon Bridge Halt is now a footpath and cycleway, however other sections of the line have formal and informal footpaths on the old trackbed. The access through the wall to the halt is still present but unused.

== Routes ==
Preceding station	Historical railways	Following station
Kidwelly; Line closed, and station open	Burry Port and Gwendraeth Valley Railway; Great Western Railway	Trimsaran Road; Line and station Closed

== See also ==
- West Wales lines
