= BP&GV 4 Kidwelly and 5 Cwm Mawr =

Burry Port and Gwendraeth Valley Railway 4 Kidwelly & 5 Cwm Mawr GWR 2194 & 2195
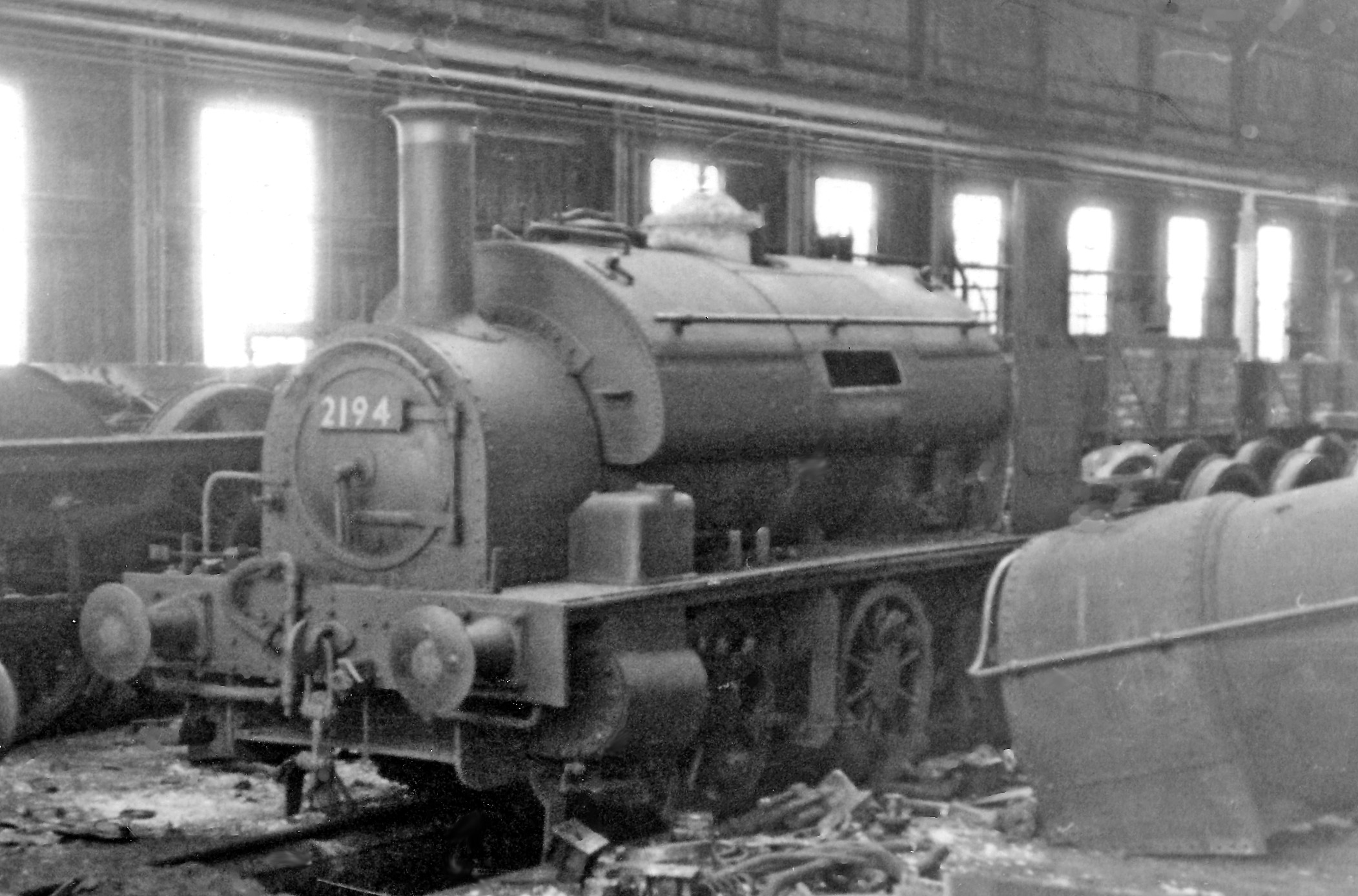
- 2194 being scrapped at Swindon Works
Type and origin
- Power type: Steam
- Designer: Eager
- Builder: Avonside Engine Company
- Serial number: 1463, 1491
- Build date: May 1903, April 1905
- Total produced: 2
Specifications
- Configuration
  - Whyte: 0-6-0ST
  - UIC: C n2t
- Gauge: 4 ft 8 1/2 in (1,435 mm) standard gauge
- Driver dia.: 3 ft 6 in (1.067 m)
- Wheelbase: 11 ft (3.35 m)
- Axle load: 11.4 long tons (11.6 t; 12.8 short tons)
- Loco weight: 31.35 long tons (31.85 t; 35.11 short tons)
- Fuel type: Coal
- Water cap.: 745 imp gal (3,390 L; 895 US gal)
- Firebox
  - Grate area: 9.27 sq ft (0.861 m^{2})
- Boiler pressure: 150 lbf/in^{2} (1.0 MPa)
- Heating surface
  - Firebox: 54.6 sq ft (5.07 m^{2})
  - Tubes: 506.4 sq ft (47.05 m^{2})
  - Total surface: 561.0 sq ft (52.12 m^{2})
- Cylinders: Two, outside
- Cylinder size: 15 in × 20 in (381 mm × 508 mm)
- Valve gear: Stephenson
- Train brakes: 4: none; 5: vacuum
Performance figures
- Tractive effort: 13,660 lbf (60.76 kN)
Career
- Operators: Burry Port and Gwendraeth Valley Railway; → Great Western Railway; → British Railways
- Power class: GWR: Ungrouped
- Numbers: BP&GV 4, 5; GWR, BR 2194–5
- Axle load class: GWR: Uncoloured
- Withdrawn: January – February 1953
- Disposition: Both scrapped
- Dimensions following rebuilding in 1922–26

The Burry Port and Gwendraeth Valley Railway (BP&GV) numbers 4 Kidwelly and 5 Cwm Mawr were small 0-6-0ST steam locomotives, originally built by the Avonside Engine Company in May 1903 and April 1905 respectively.

== History ==
They belonged to a series of seven 0-6-0ST locomotives numbered 1–7 built between 1900 and 1907 for the BP&GV to replace older locomotives; five were built by Avonside and two by Chapman & Furneaux, each of the seven being different from the others. The differences between nos. 4 and 5 were comparatively small: no. 5 had an extended smokebox, and was fitted with the vacuum brake.

They both passed to the Great Western Railway (GWR) in July 1922, which assigned them to Diagram A114 and renumbered them 2194 Kidwelly and 2195 Cwm Mawr. They were sent to Swindon for overhaul in July 1923 and November 1922, but did not return to traffic until February 1926. The rebuilds were shown on Diagram B22; virtually new boilers (GWR code YF) were provided, and the bunkers were extended. They were then sent to Weymouth, to work along the quayside lines, for which a warning bell was also fitted. No. 2195 Cwm Mawr was withdrawn in March 1939; it was reinstated, without its name, in December 1939, and then worked at Bristol and Swindon. No. 2194 Kidwelly left Weymouth in 1940, and then mostly worked at Taunton. Both passed to British Railways in 1948 but they were withdrawn in 1953 and neither was preserved.

== Numbering ==
BP&GV No.	Name	Avonside Works No.	Date made	GWR/BR number	Date withdrawn
4	Kidwelly	1463	May 1903	2194	Feb 1953
5	Cwm Mawr	1491	Apr 1905	2195	Jan 1953

== Modelling ==
Kits are available, in both 4 mm and 7 mm scales, from Agenoria Models.

== See also ==
- Locomotives of the Great Western Railway
