= Burry Port and Gwendraeth Valley Railway =

Railway company in Wales (1868–1922)

The Burry Port and Gwendraeth Valley Railway (BP&GVR) was a mineral railway company that constructed a railway line in Carmarthenshire, Wales, by conversion of a canal, to connect collieries and limestone pits to the sea at Kidwelly. It extended its network to include Burry Port, Trimsaran and a brickworks at Pwll, later extending to Sandy near Llanelli. For a time the company worked the separate Gwendreath Valleys Railway (GVR). The BP&GVR was notable because of the very low height of some overbridges, a legacy of the canal conversion.

It was completely dependent on the economy of the mineral industries it served and due to depression in them, it was for many years in administration. In the final years of the nineteenth century those industries developed considerably and the fortunes of the BP&GVR improved as well, paying 10% dividends for several years, before absorption by the Great Western Railway in 1922.

For some time the line carried miners to their place of work, and their families to market, and from 1913 the company carried the general public in passenger trains.

After 1945 mineral extraction in the area declined steeply; passenger operation ceased in 1953, and in the 1960s most of the network closed progressively as pits closed. The final short section at Kidwelly closed in 1998.

== The canal before the railway ==
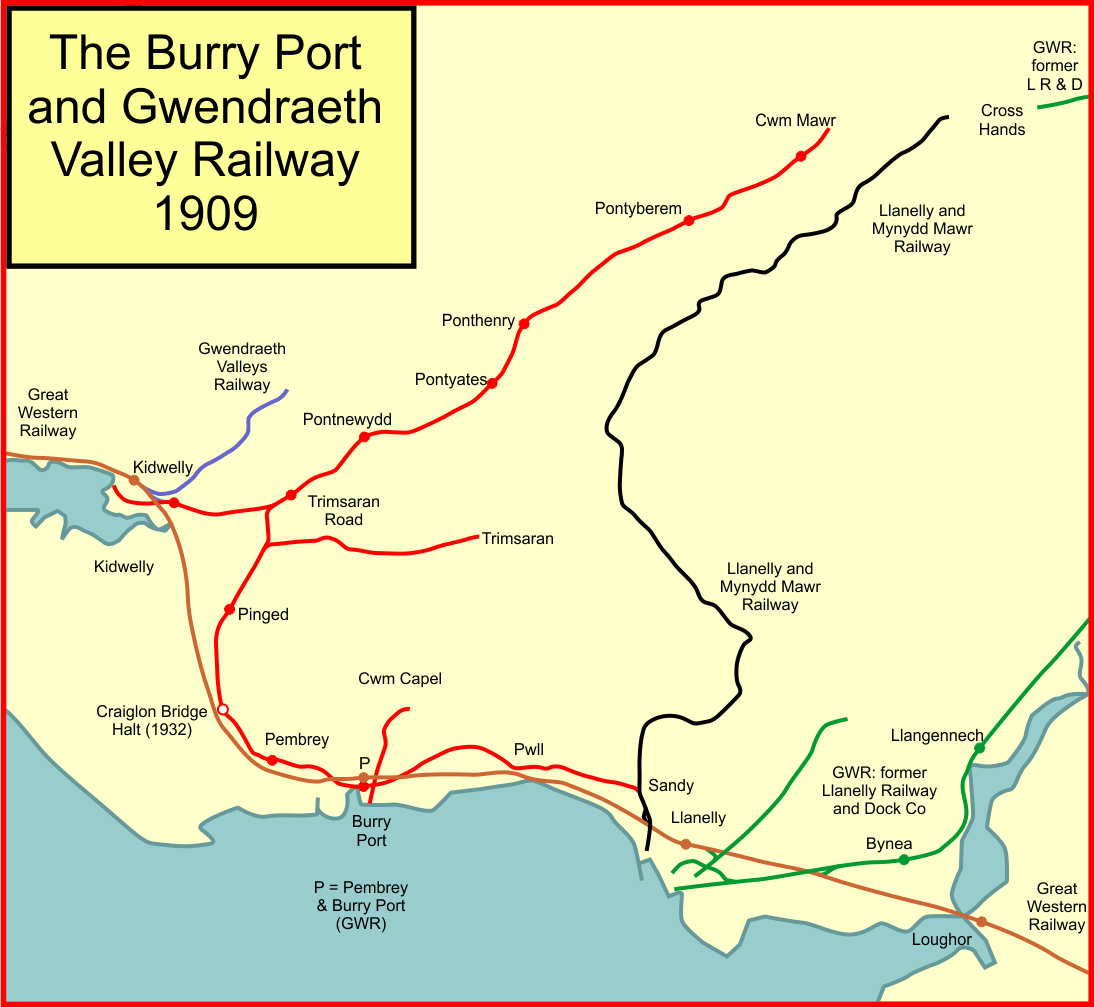
The BP&GVR system

Coal had been extracted in the area above Llanelly for centuries, but transport of the heavy mineral to market was difficult. Coastal shipping was essential to the process, although there were limited harbour facilities before the nineteenth century. Getting the coal from the hills to the coast was the problem.

About 1768 Thomas Kymer had built a canal to Pwll-y-Llygod, and a waggonway was constructed from the head of the canal there to pits at Carway a mile or so distant. The rails were of timber and the wagon wheels were flanged; it was probably opened in 1769.

In 1796 John Curr developed a plateway system, in which flat plates with an upstand for guidance could carry wagons with plain wheels.

The Stradey Estate near Llanelly had long been active in mining, and had constructed plateways; horse traction was used. The most important waggonway on the estate brought coal from a pit at Cille to Llanelly where small ships were beached for loading, as there was no proper wharfage at the time.

In 1804 the Carmarthenshire Railway was opened; it was an important plateway connecting coal pits near Cross Hands and ironworks to the harbour (which it developed itself) at Llanelly.

In 1812 the Kidwelly and Llanelly Canal and Tramroad Company was authorised by the Kidwelly and Llanelly Canal and Tramroad Company Act 1812 (52 Geo. 3. c. clxxiii). As well as the main line of the canal, there were to be waggonways as feeders to the canal. Two waggonway branches, probably of 4 ft 2 in (1,270 mm) gauge in connection with the Burry Port harbour were completed in 1832. The waggonways were horse-operated; one ran north to Cwmcapel and the other east to Sandy, near Llanelly. At this point it connected with the Cille Colliery waggonway on the Stradey Estate. Completion of the project was much delayed, taking until 1837, by which time railway technology was clearly overtaking canals as the dominant transport medium.

A powerful storm breached the main line near Sandy in 1846, and the low traffic volume was not considered to justify the expenditure of reinstatement. From then onwards the line from Burry Port ended at a colliery and brickworks at Pwll. The company also had two short branch canals which were extended by tramroads to the collieries at Trimsaran and Carway. The tramroads were owned by the respective collieries.

The main line of the canal up the Gwendraeth Fawr Valley reached Cwm Mawr at a considerable altitude, and the upper level had three inclined planes, with gradients of 1 in 13, 1 in 7 1/2 and 1 in 10 1/4. By 1865 the top portion of the canal above this last incline had become disused, and a tramroad was laid along the towpath.

== Broad gauge railways ==
In 1844 the Great Western Railway (GWR) sponsored the South Wales Railway to build a broad gauge railway connecting Gloucester, and the GWR network, with Fishguard, originally with the intention of forming a rail and ferry connection to Dublin. The line from Landore (Swansea) to Carmarthen opened on 11 October 1852. The GWR worked the line, and although the relationship was not always smooth, amalgamation followed on 1 August 1863. When the South Wales Railway line was opened it crossed the tramroads to Pwll and Cwm Capel on the level.

There had been proposals for railways from Kidwelly into the Gwendraeth Fach Valley but the powers lapsed without any construction taking place, but in 1864 a bill was presented by the Carmarthen and Cardigan Railway (C&CR) to build two broad or mixed gauge branches from the GWR at Kidwelly. The Carmarthen and Cardigan Railway was a broad gauge line friendly to the Great Western Railway. One of the proposed branches, known as the "Lime Line", (Note: Lime was an important mineral for the improvement of agricultural land at the time; limestone was also used in iron production.) was to be routed via Mynydd-y-Garreg to Velindre in the Gwendraeth Fach Valley; the other, known as the "Coal Line" was to cross the canal and the river Gwendraeth Fawr in an eastward direction and then curve north-eastwards via the Carway Colliery up the Gwendraeth Fawr Valley to Coalbrook. The Coal Line was thrown out in Parliament but the Lime Line was authorised by the Carmarthen and Cardigan Railway (Kidwelly Branch) Act 1864 (27 & 28 Vict. c. xiii) of 28 April. A second attempt at the Coal Line was made in the following session of Parliament, and this time it was authorised by the Carmarthen and Cardigan Railway (Kidwelly Extension) Act 1865 (28 & 29 Vict. c. clxx) of 29 June. However the C&CR found itself unable to raise the capital authorised, and it never reached Cardigan, nor built the branch.

=== Gwendreath Valleys Railway ===
Gwendreath Valleys Railway Act 1866
- Act of Parliament
- Parliament of the United Kingdom
- Long title: An Act to separate the Kidwelly Branch and Extension from the rest of the Undertaking of the Carmarthen and Cardigan Railway Company, and to incorporate a Company for the Purposes of the said Branch and Extension.
- Citation: 29 & 30 Vict. c. ccxcvii

Dates
- Royal assent: 30 July 1866

As part of the financial solution, the two Kidwelly branches were transferred to a new company: the Gwendreath Valleys Railway (GVR), authorised by the Gwendreath Valleys Railway Act 1866 (29 & 30 Vict. c. ccxcvii) of 30 July. This new concern duly completed a short length of the Lime Line to Mynydd-y-Garreg and this opened to broad gauge traffic in 1868. A short section of the earthworks for the Coal Line was completed, but then this line was abandoned.

== Converting the canal ==
At this time there were also movements to revive the old Carmarthenshire Railway; this had been built as a plateway in 1804, bringing down minerals from Cross Hands to a harbour at Llanelly. The Llanelly Railway and Dock Company had opened a line from Llanelly to serve pits in the Cwmamman area, also reaching Cross Hands and extending to Llandeilo. In 1861 the LR&D obtained an act of Parliament, the Llanelly Railway (New Lines) Act 1861 (24 & 25 Vict. c. ccxvii), giving authority to extend from Llandeilo to Carmarthen, and the line opened to goods trains in 1864.

Kidwelly and Burry Port Railway Act 1865
- Act of Parliament
- Parliament of the United Kingdom
- Long title: An Act to authorize the Kidwelly and Llanelly Canal and Tramroad Company to stop up and discontinue the Use of their Canals, and to make a Railway from Burry Port in the Parish of Pembrey to join the Mountain Branch of the Llanelly Railway in the Parish of Llanarthney, Carmarthenshire, with Branches; to change the Name of the Company; and for other Purposes.
- Citation: 28 & 29 Vict. c. ccxviii

Dates
- Royal assent: 5 July 1865

Text of statute as originally enacted

Coupled with the Carmarthen and Cardigan Railway, these schemes represented a definite competitive threat to the Kidwelly and Llanelly Canal and Tramroad Company, and it submitted a bill to Parliament to convert the obsolescent canal system to a railway. The bill received the royal assent on 5 July 1865 as the Kidwelly and Burry Port Railway Act 1865 (28 & 29 Vict. c. ccxviii); the canal company was to change its name to the Kidwelly and Burry Port Railway Company (K&BPR). It was to absorb Kymer's canal and build 18 1/2 miles of new railways: from Burry Port to a junction with the Mountain Branch of the Llanelly Railway and Dock Company at Llanarthney, and a second main line to Cross Hands Colliery. The authorised capital for the project was £120,000, of which £72,400 represented the purchase price of the canal system; as out-dated technology threatened by viable competitors this was plainly a huge over-valuation.

Burry Port and Gwendreath Valley Railway Act 1866
- Act of Parliament
- Parliament of the United Kingdom
- Long title: An Act for the Amalgamation of the Kidwelly and Burry Port Railway Company and the Burry Port Company; and for other Purposes.
- Citation: 29 & 30 Vict. c. v

Dates
- Royal assent: 30 April 1866

Other legislation
- Repealed by: Burry Port Harbour Revision Order 2000

Status: Repealed

Burry Port and Gwendreath Valley Railway Amendment Act 1868
- Act of Parliament
- Parliament of the United Kingdom
- Long title: An Act for granting further Powers to the Burry Port and Gwewdreath Valley Railway Company.
- Citation: 31 & 32 Vict. c. i

Dates
- Royal assent: 29 May 1868

Text of statute as originally enacted

The new railway system was closely connected with the Burry Port Harbour Company, with which it shared many directors, and the decision was taken to combine the two companies. This was done by a further act, the Burry Port and Gwendreath Valley Railway Act 1866 (29 & 30 Vict. c. v), of 30 April 1866 vesting the Burry Port Harbour in the K&BPR and changing the name of the combined undertaking to the Burry Port and Gwendreath Valley Railway. The harbour company's share and loan capital of £85,000 was added to that of the K&BPR. The company's parliamentary legal advisors included the misspelling Gwendreath in the deposited documents and it was under that name that the company was authorised. The company seems not to have noticed the error for two years, but the opportunity to correct the matter was not taken in the Burry Port and Gwendreath Valley Railway Amendment Act 1868 (31 & 32 Vict. c. i), nor in any later acts. (Note: The spelling Burry Port and Gwendraeth Valley Railway is generally used in this article.)

A contractor, Frederick Furness, was appointed on 9 July 1868 and he was prepared to take part of the payment for his services in preference shares. The canal was closed and the line was laid as far as possible on the towpath. Under certain bridges the line was laid at a lower level than the towpath, necessitating short downgrades to pass under; nonetheless the headroom at overbridges was very restricted, leading to problems later. At the locks quite steep gradients were employed to accommodate the change of level. The track was laid with flat bottom rails weighing 50 to 60 lbs per yard spiked directly to the sleepers.

With the canal closed it was obviously essential to make the conversion and open the railway quickly, and the line was officially opened as far as Pontyberem on 23 June 1869. (Note: Date from Miller; Barrie says "in July 1869", as do Carter and Bourne.) It had cost £33,841 to build, excluding the cost of acquisition of the canal. The short Carway branch opened about the end of 1870 and that to the Star Colliery at Trimsaran followed in June 1872. The opening of the main line and these branches encouraged the revitalisation of several pits in the area, by reducing the cost of transport of the mineral to market; however this effect was accompanied by some closures as well. The main line was completed to the foot of the Hirwaen Isaf incline, a mile short of Cwm Mawr in 1870. (Note: From Miller. Bourne, Morgan and Cobb suggest that Cwm Mawr was reached in 1869. In addition, the designation "Cwm Mawr" is ambiguous, referring to the general area and not necessarily the final terminus of the railway.)

Mason and Elkington Ltd owned a copper works at Burry Port, and acquired the Pool (or Pwll) colliery in 1865. They started converting an old canal tramroad from Burry Port to Pool into a railway; the work took at least until 1867. The same company converted the old Cwm Capel waggonway to a railway in 1876. It was not directly connected to the BP&GVR, but was accessed through the docks and the GWR line.

== Early operation ==
Burry Port and Gwendreath Valley Railway Amendment Act 1871
- Act of Parliament
- Parliament of the United Kingdom
- Long title: An Act to extend the time granted to the Burry Port and Gwendreath Valley Railway Company for the completion of certain railways.
- Citation: 34 & 35 Vict. c. clxxvi

Dates
- Royal assent: 31 July 1871

Text of statute as originally enacted

The BP&GVR was simply a mineral railway (general merchandise was carried too) and operated without signalling.

In December 1869 the BP&GVR tried out a double Fairlie locomotive, named Pioneer, which had been constructed for a Swedish railway (Nassjo Oscarshamn Railway) but not delivered to them. The trial was very successful and the company purchased the locomotive for £1,822, renaming it Mountaineer. A second double Fairlie was acquired soon after.

Burry Port and Gwendreath Valley Railway Act 1872
- Act of Parliament
- Parliament of the United Kingdom
- Long title: An Act to enable the Burry Port and Gwendreath Valley Railway Company to construct further Works at Burry Port in the Parish of Pembrey in the county of Carmarthen; and for other purposes.
- Citation: 35 & 36 Vict. c. cxxvi)

Dates
- Royal assent: 18 July 1872

Other legislation
- Repealed by: Burry Port Harbour Revision Order 2000

Status: Repealed

Burry Port and Gwendreath Valley Railway Amendment Act 1874
- Act of Parliament
- Parliament of the United Kingdom
- Long title: An Act to extend the time granted to the Burry Port and Gwendreath Valley Railway Company for the completion of certain Railways.
- Citation: 37 & 38 Vict. c. clxxvi

Dates
- Royal assent: 30 July 1874

Text of statute as originally enacted

Burry Port and Gwendreath Valley Railway Act 1877
- Act of Parliament
- Parliament of the United Kingdom
- Long title: An Act to extend the time granted to the Burry Port and Gwendreath Valley Railway Company for the completion of certain Railways and Works; and for other purposes.
- Citation: 40 & 41 Vict. c. ccxiv

Dates
- Royal assent: 10 August 1877

Text of statute as originally enacted

The BP&GVR obtained a further act of Parliament, the Burry Port and Gwendreath Valley Railway Act 1872 (35 & 36 Vict. c. cxxvi), on 18 July 1872 authorising the raising of additional capital, and the construction of a branch to Kymer's Quay at Kidwelly. The extra capital was to be £97,000, though only £2,200 was actually taken up; borrowing was permitted and this was activated. The 2 1/4 mile section to Kidwelly Quay was opened in June 1873. However serious silting of the harbour meant that little use was made of it by shipping, and the railway activity was correspondingly limited.

The neighbouring Gwendreath Valleys Railway (GVR) had reopened in 1872 as a standard gauge line from the GWR at Kidwelly to Mynydd-y-Garreg. Relations between the GVR and the BP&GVR became strained for a time over the supposedly inadequate working by the BP&GVR of GVR traffic to the quay, but matters later improved. The GVR was worked by the BP&GVR by agreement of 30 November 1876; the GVR only had one locomotive, and this was taken into BP&GVR stock.

On 17 July 1880 the West of England Bank failed, and the financial aftermath resulted in the Pontyberem Colliery also failing. This loss of the major customer of the line resulted in the BP&GVR not making enough income to pay debenture interest, and it was referred to the Court of Chancery; on 29 July 1881 the company was in receivership.

From at the latest June 1883 passenger excursions were run from time to time, in most cases form the collieries to the seaside. This was not a regular passenger service and the passenger vehicles were probably ordinary coal wagons. No fares were charged, the trip being free for the miners and their families. Excursion trains are known to have run to Pontnewydd dating back to the 1870s in connection with the eisteddfods held in the grounds of Glyn Abbey.

However a workmen's service was started before the end of 1898, from Burry Port and calling at Trimsaran Road bridge at Morfa to pick up miners who had walked there from Kidwelly. When the Kidwelly branch was relaid with stronger track as far as Tycoch Junction where the Gwendraeth Valley line connected, a workmen's' trains ran from Tycoch Bridge, about half a mile from the centre of Kidwelly.

As well as the miners' train every weekday, a Thursday market train was run to Llanelly, chiefly for the wives and families. The miners paid for their travel by deduction from their wages rather than by ticket, and the families visiting the market paid a charge per parcel brought home. No doubt this was considered to overcome Board of Trade rules about commercial passenger operation, and the payment of passenger duty.

== Extensions, but in receivership ==
The main line was finally completed to Cwm Mawr in June 1886 (although Miller mentions several other dates put forward by other sources). The heritage of the canal inclined planes meant that the ruling gradient on the extension to Cwm Mawr was 1 in 14.

There was a gap of only 1 1/2 miles between the BP&GVR at Pwll and the Llanelly and Mynydd Mawr Railway (L&MMR) at Sandy, and a connection, enabling BP&GVR traffic to reach Llanelly harbour was proposed. In early 1889 the L&MMR was approached to see if it would agree to the connection, and the outcome was that the L&MMR offered to purchase the BP&GVR instead. At the time the BP&GVR was still heavily indebted and the purchase would have cleared the debts. The existing shares in the company were almost worthless, but acceptance of the offer would have realised that unpalatable fact, and after some hesitation the offer was put in abeyance in 1890. Instead a financial reconstruction was arranged, in which many shareholders received reduced holdings and debenture holders lower interest rates; arrears of interest were cancelled. The scheme was accepted and the former £373,000 issued capital of the company was reduced to £148,000. This enabled the company to apply to be released from receivership and this took place on 5 July 1895. The company soon found itself unable to pay the current interest, however, and it was returned to receivership on 6 February 1896. This second period lasted until release on 29 July 1898. For the half year ended 30 June 1899 preference shareholders received a dividend of 2 1/2%, although ordinary shareholders had to wait.

Burry Port and Gwendreath Valley Railway Act 1891
- Act of Parliament
- Parliament of the United Kingdom
- Long title: An Act for conferring further powers upon the Burry Port and Gwendreath Valley Railway Company.
- Citation: 54 & 55 Vict. c. clxxi

Dates
- Royal assent: 28 July 1891

Text of statute as originally enacted

The Sandy to Pwll connection was proceeded with, authorised the Burry Port and Gwendreath Valley Railway Act 1891 (54 & 55 Vict. c. clxxi) passed on 28 July.

== Passenger operation ==
On 3 September 1903 there was a collision between a light engine and one of the workmen's trains. The Board of Trade wrote to the company on 23 September warning of the "responsibility incurred by your company in carrying persons in this manner without the proper safeguards adopted for passenger lines". Lt Col Yorke of the Board of Trade visited the line by invitation to discuss what the proper safeguards might be, and he advised that the Board of Trade "could not recognise the practice of carrying outsiders..."

From the careful wording it is evident that the carrying of workmen was condoned, but that it had come to light that the company had been improperly permitting the carriage of members of the general public. The company continued running the workmen's trains.

At the same time local people were demanding the operation of a public passenger service on the line; an outlay of £8,500 was calculated to be necessary to enable that, and the work was deferred. However public opinion was insistent and the company noted that the Light Railways Act 1896 permitted the authorisation of passenger operation as a light railway on an existing line. To ensure that they made use of relevant experience, the company consulted Holman Fred Stephens (later Colonel Stephens), who had much experience on the field. Stephens produced a report and waited on the directors at a meeting on 13 July 1908; his estimate confirmed the £8,500 previously arrived at.

The scheme gathered pace, and new, heavier, rails were ordered together with a new locomotive and signalling equipment. Ten second-hand coaches were acquired from the Metropolitan Railway. On 30 June 1909 the Burry Port and Gwendreath Valley Railway (Light Railway) Order 1909 (Cd. 4778) was confirmed by the Board of Trade, and the passenger service was inaugurated on 2 August 1909. As well as the main line, the branch to Ty Coch was included. The main line operation was as far as Pontyberem, although a petition had been received from residents at Cwm Mawr for a service; the incremental cost of that would have been £4,000, and there were formidable gradients on that section. Public stations were at Burry Port (immediately south of the GWR Pembrey & Burry Port station), Pembrey, Pinged, Trimsaran Road, Pontnewydd (renamed Glyn Abbey in 1910), Pontyates, Ponthenry railway station, and Pontyberem.

The possibility of extension of passenger operation to Cwm Mawr was revisited; considerable new earthworks were required to ease the gradient to 1 in 40, and an estimate of £4,844 for the work was arrived at. The proposal was ratified and the Burry Port and Gwendreath Valley Railway (Light Railway Extension) Order 1911 (Cd. 5919) was confirmed by the Board of Trade on 4 October 1911. Three former London and South Western Railway six-wheel coaches were acquired, to be converted to four-wheelers; (Note: Morgan says that these coaches had always been four-wheelers.) Cwm Mawr was to be supplied with water and electricity from the New Dynant Anthracite Colliery company. Passenger services started on 29 January 1913. Another halt was opened to serve Glynhebog Colliery, probably in 1898 when the passenger service was extended to Cwmmawr.

After the introduction of authorized passenger trains from 2 August 1909 the workmen's trains on the main line became regular service trains; however, the Ponthenry and Pentremawr Colliery halts for the collieries were not shown in the public timetable, and only certain trains stopped there. The halt at Trimsaran Road became a regular stopping place, and additional halts were opened to serve other collieries at Trimsaran Junction and Carway Colliery Sidings (between Glyn Abbey and Pontyates). Workmen's trains continued to run to Ty-coch on the Kidwelly branch but these were not shown in the public timetable.

== The twentieth century ==
In the first years of the 20th century the production of anthracite in the area served by the railway increased very considerably, and the fortunes and profitability of the company rose correspondingly. 10% dividends were paid on ordinary shares in certain years in the period.

At the end of 1903 the Gwendreath Valleys Railway Company approached the BP&GVR with the intention of selling their concern; the BP&GVR negotiated but an acceptable price could not be agreed, and the Gwendreath Valleys Railway (GVR) later sold its line to the Kidwelly Tinplate Company for £3,000, effective from the end of 1904. The new owner immediately procured a locomotive and gave three months notice to terminate the working arrangement (whereby the BP&GVR worked the GVR); this took place in March 1904.

Burry Port declined as a port, with collieries preferring to forward coal to Swansea Docks where larger ships and mechanical handling facilities meant that the mineral could be dealt with more efficiently. More wagons were being sent away over the GWR main line, and the exchange sidings at Burry Port became congested with loaded wagons waiting to be taken forward, and empties returning to the collieries. Some traffic was deviated to join the GWR at Kidwelly via Tycoch; previously this route had only been used for coal travelling on towards West Wales.

A triangular junction was former at Kidwelly Junction, by the installation of a south to west curve, known as the Kidwelly Loop; this enabled direct running from Llanelly and Pwll to Kidwelly GWR; it was laid by 1909. At the same time silting of the Gwendraeth estuary led to the little quay at Kidwelly being much less used after 1920, and it is believed that the last traffic to use it before closure in October 1929 was roadstone. The track from Tycoch Junction to the quay was recovered in 1933.

In January 1913 the designation of up and down directions was reversed; it had been "up" to Burry Port, but now it was "up" to Cwm Mawr; the reason for the change is not clear, but "up" was now uphill.

== Sale to the Great Western Railway ==
The Railways Act 1921 was passed by the government and resulted in most of the railways of Great Britain being "grouped" into four large concerns. The Great Western Railway (GWR) was to be one of the groups and therefore it was to absorb many smaller lines in its geographical area. The BP&GVR had already been considering a sale to the GWR, and the excellent profitability of the little line now meant that a good price could be negotiated. The proposed GWR scheme of absorption received approval by the BP&GVR board on 20 March 1922 and an extraordinary shareholders' meeting was held on 10 July. The Railway Amalgamation Tribunal of 24 July 1922 ratified the scheme, which was backdated to 1 July 1922 for administrative purposes. The BP&GVR network was now simply a part of the GWR. (Note: This took place six months before the actual "grouping", considered to take place on 1 January 1923. Indeed, some of the forcibly grouped companies trailed into late 1923 as negotiations dragged on. Miller and Barry do not say whether the absorption was simply a pre-emptive part of the grouping, or independently motivated. Only Carter says the BP&GVR was "acquired by the Great Western Railway in pursuance of the grouping arrangements of the Railways Act of 1921".)

The terms for shareholders agreed with the GWR were for 10 GWR preference shares to be exchanged for each of the 3,312 BP&GVR preference shares, and for 143 GWR ordinary shares to replace every 10 BP&GVR ordinary shares.

== After 1923 ==
Kymers Quay had long been moribund due to silting and the inability to handle modern, larger vessels, and the BP&GVR branch to the Quay closed beyond Tycoch Junction in October 1929.

A new passenger halt called Craiglon Bridge Halt was opened on 1 February 1932.

The Cwm Capel branch at Burry Port had long been worked by the locomotives of the Pembrey Copper Works. Crossing the GWR main line on the level, it was worked by the GWR after 1898. In the 1920s traffic declined, and Cwm Capel colliery closed in 1931. After that date there was little traffic on the branch after 1931. In 1932 the signal box controlling the crossing of the branch over the main line (Snook's Crossing) was closed, the crossing being protected by a ground frame. The track on the Cwm Capel branch remained for a time in case the colliery re-opened, but was eventually lifted in 1940.

During World War II women were employed on various duties to alleviate staff shortages; at one time on the BP&GVR section there was a woman porter and several women signallers, and at one period there were women operating all the signal boxes except Ty Mawr and Cwmmawr. They found that some of the point levers were difficult to operate, especially those at Dock Junction and Kidwelly Junction boxes, with each lever working both the points and the locking. (Note: The railway had made extensive use of "economical" point levers, in which the point movement and the facing point lock were operated by a single pull of one lever. This "economised" the cost of the lever frame installation by reducing the number of levers. The mechanical advantage of the lever was much reduced by this and the pull was much heavier.)

== After 1948 ==
The railways of Great Britain were nationalised in 1948, and from 1 January were part of British Railways.

Consideration of the closure to passengers had started in January 1951. It was found that during 1949 71,397 passenger journeys were recorded; passenger receipts came to £1,499, stated to result in a loss of £1,144 for the year. The intention to close was announced; objections were received: the main objections were that the inhabitants of Glyn Abbey and Pontnewydd would be left without any alternative bus service, and the 9.30 pm train from Burry Port was being replaced by a motor bus leaving at 10.00 pm which it was claimed arrived at the Capel Ifan Slant too late for the miners starting their shift at 11.00 pm. Arrangements were made to deal with the objections and the last passenger trains ran on Saturday 19 September 1953.

From 1953 opencast coal extraction gathered pace in the Gwendraeth Valley, and this coupled with economic factors gradually led to closure of most of the deep mines. By 1961 only the Capel Ifan Colliery at Pontyberem continued deep mining, and that pit ceased to forward coal by rail in 1970.

The Sandy branch, connected the BP&GVR to the Llanelly and Mynydd Mawr Railway near Llanelly. At the eastern end it divided into two and curved round to the south; one part joined the Stradey estate line and the other the L&MMR line; with the closure of the Pwll brickworks all traffic between Burry Port and Sandy Gate sidings ceased from 4 October 1962. Sandy Gate sidings were simply located on a short stub now served from Sandy, and that too closed on 22 December 1963.

The Trimsaran branch closed to revenue traffic in 1960, but it was retained for wagon storage until June 1962. Goods traffic to Pwll Brickworks ended on 4 October 1962. Regular traffic to Smart's Dinas Silica Brickworks at Kidwelly ceased in February 1959, after which the Kidwelly branch was little used, and was closed in October 1965.

The section from Kidwelly Junction to Kidwelly closed in October 1965, but reopened after relaying on 19 September 1983.

Diesel traction was inaugurated on the BP&GVR section on 4 October 1965. Two D2000 class (later 03 class) locomotives were modified to work together in multiple, and soon a third was used to bank the trains up the steep gradients in the rear of the train. On the downhill journey the three locomotives hauled the train. The cabs were cut down to pass under the low bridges on the line. The original reason for the use of the 03 class was the frequent flooding on the line which would interfere with the low-slung auxiliary equipment on the more powerful 08 class; however in June 1984 the affected section of line was closed and there was no longer an objection to the 08 class; three locomotives were modified to lower the profile for the low bridges and were designated class 08/9.

The short section from the New Dynant North ground frame to the Cwmmawr terminus was closed on 1 May 1967, although the coal depot at New Dynant continued to be referred to as Cwmmawr.

The Kidwelly branch beyond Coed Bach was re-opened (after relaying the track) on 19 September 1983 and for the first time large main line locomotives were able to use this short section of the BP&GVR as far as Coed Bach. The re-opening enabled the original section of line from Burry Port to Kidwelly Junction to be completely closed, from 19 September 1983. The remaining line was now worked in two sections; Kidwelly yard to Coed Bach and Coed Bach to Cwmmawr (New Dynant). From February 1987 substitute locomotives capable of operating air-braked wagons were introduced on the line,

The very last train to Cwmmawr ran on Friday 29 March 1996, so that closure of this remaining section of the BP&GVR main line took place on 1 April 1996. Coed Bach continued to be fed by road so there was still rail traffic over the short distance from there to Kidwelly yard. This remaining stub of the BP&GVR, and also of the GVR, finally closed on 23 March 1998.

== Preservation ==
There has been some discussion of preserving the railway however the tight clearances and light construction of the line would be a problem. The costs however of preserving the entire line were, at that time, prohibitive. Parts of the route can be walked as part of the Pontiets (formerly Pont Yates) mining heritage trail and the section between Burry Port and Craiglon Bridge Halt is now a footpath/cycleway. Preservation of the railway at Pontyates has now begun. Much of the group's railway stock is in storage at the Pontypool and Blaenavon Railway.

Only one Burry Port and Gwendraeth Valley Railway locomotive still exists this day into preservation. The last survivor is BP&GVR No.2 Pontyberem, an 0-6-0ST built by Avonside Engine Company in 1900. It is in need of overhaul and being restored to working order. The engine was sold off by the Great Western Society and is now in private hands, currently residing at the Pontypool and Blaenavon Railway.

Six examples of cut down Class 03 Shunter that were used on the line still exist today, 03119, 03120, 03141, 03144, 03145, 03152

In May 2016, it was reported that the first trains on the preserved railway could be velorails (pedal powered rail vehicles).

== Locomotives ==
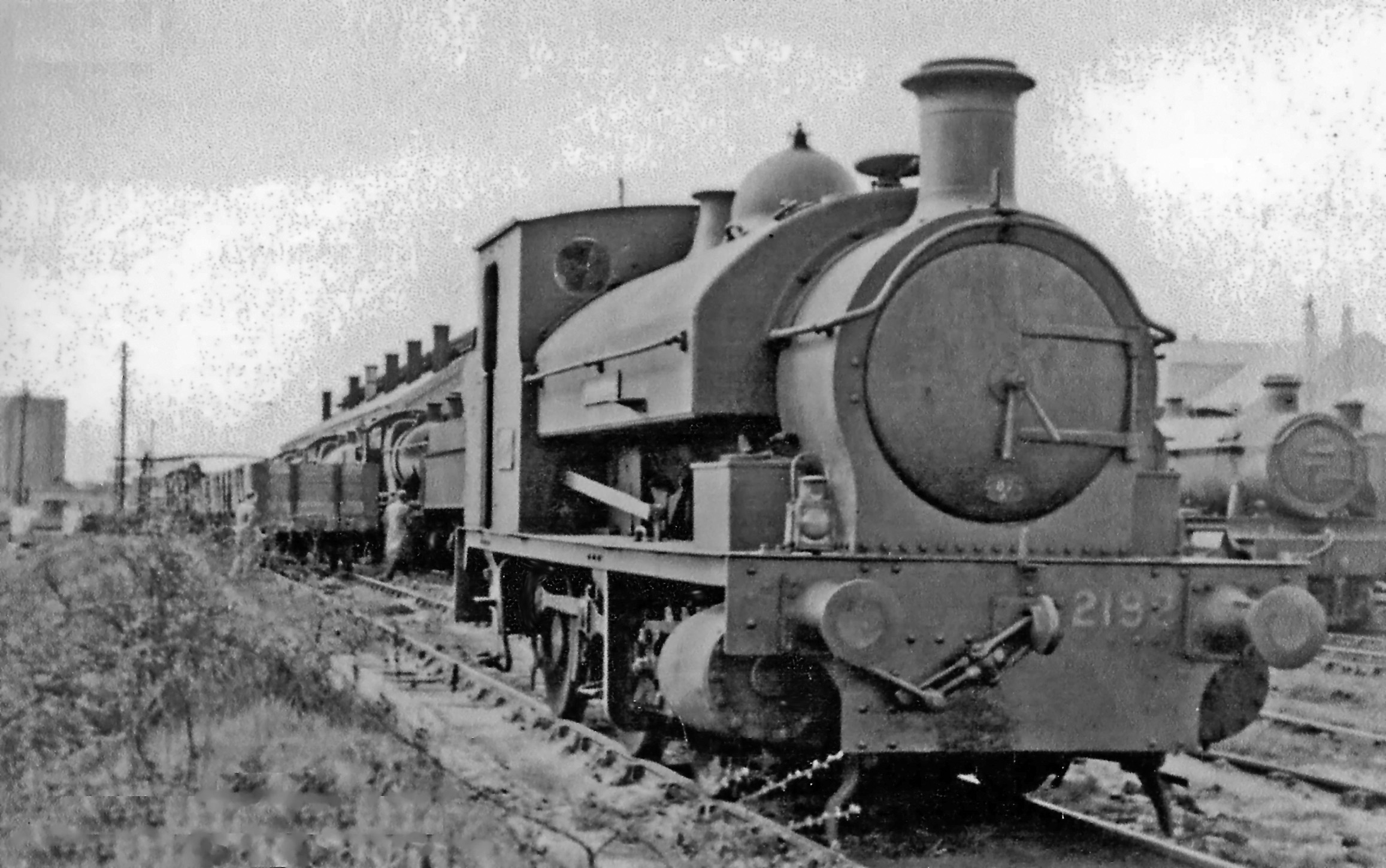
0-6-0ST GWR 2192 Ashburnham (ex-BP&GVR No. 1 Ashburnham) at Severn Tunnel Junction in 1951

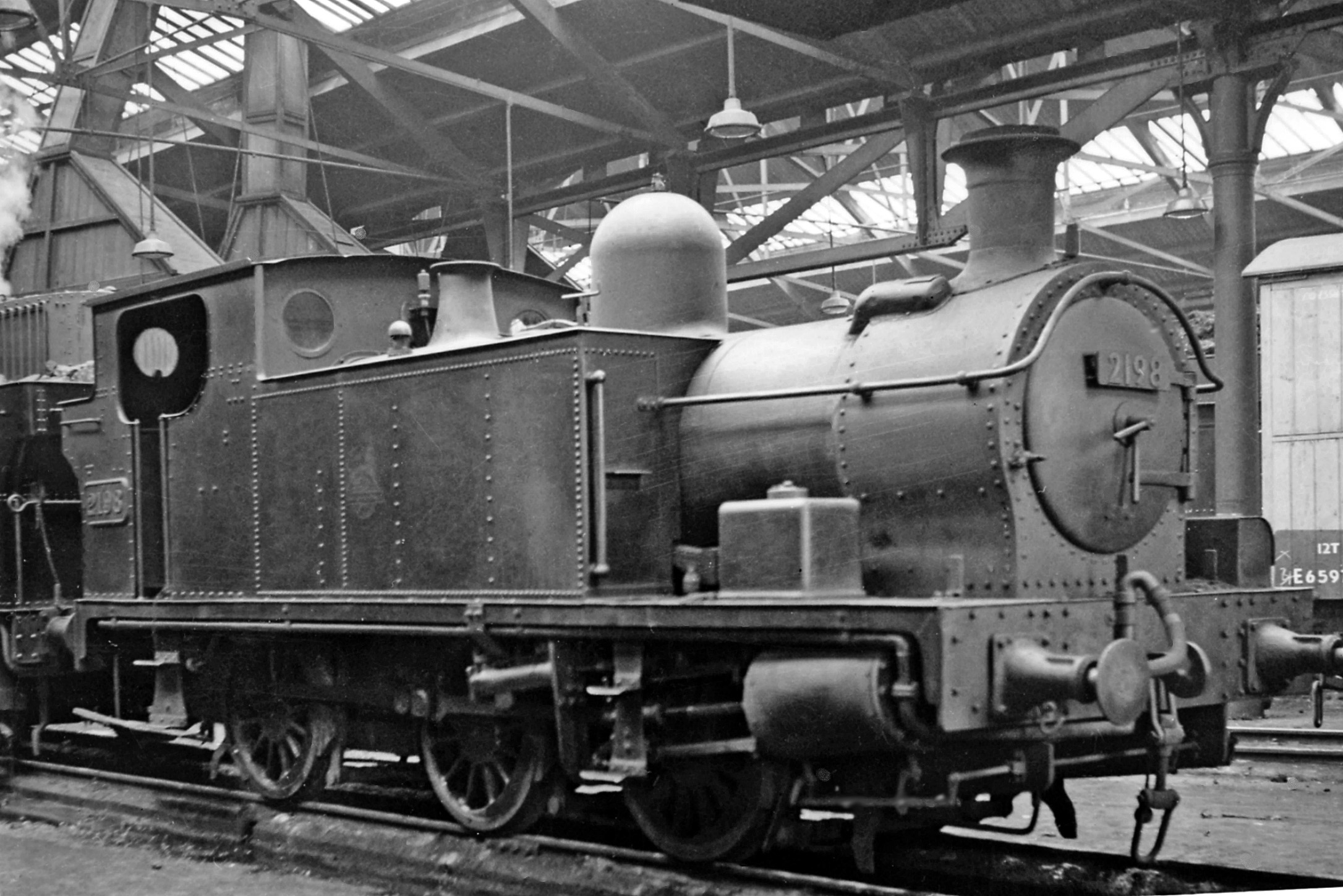
0-6-0T GWR 2198 (ex-BP&GVR No. 10) at Llanelly shed in 1958

Table of BP&GVR locomotives
BP&GVR No.	Manufacturer	Serial No.	Date made	Type	GWR No.	Date withdrawn	Notes
1 Ashburnham	Chapman and Furneaux	1197	Aug 1900	0-6-0ST	2192	Apr 1951	
2 Pontyberem	Avonside Engine Company	1421	1900	0-6-0ST	—	Sold into industrial use 1914	First No. 2; preserved at Pontypool and Blaenavon Railway
3 Burry Port	Chapman and Furneaux	1209	Sep 1901	0-6-0ST	2193	Feb 1952	
4 Kidwelly	Avonside Engine Company	1463	May 1903	0-6-0ST	2194	Feb 1953	Nos. 4 and 5 same type
5 Cwm Mawr	Avonside Engine Company	1491	Apr 1905	0-6-0ST	2195	Jan 1953	Name removed in 1929
6 Gwendraeth	Avonside Engine Company	1519	Sep 1906	0-6-0ST	2196	Jan 1956	Nos. 6 and 7 similar type
7 Pembrey	Avonside Engine Company	1535	Jan 1907	0-6-0ST	2176	Mar 1955	Name removed in 1927
8 Pioneer	Hudswell Clarke	871	Mar 1909	0-6-0T	2197	Oct 1952	
9	Hudswell Clarke	893	1909	0-6-0T	2163	Apr 1944	Nos. 9, 11–15 and second No.2 same type
10	Hudswell Clarke	924	Dec 1910	0-6-0T	2198	Mar 1959	
11	Hudswell Clarke	969	Mar 1912	0-6-0T	2164	Feb 1929	
12	Hudswell Clarke	1024	May 1913	0-6-0T	2165	Mar 1955	
2	Hudswell Clarke	1066	May 1914	0-6-0T	2162	Mar 1955	Second No. 2
15	Hudswell Clarke	1164	Feb 1916	0-6-0T	2168	May 1956	
13	Hudswell Clarke	1222	Oct 1916	0-6-0T	2166	May 1955	
14	Hudswell Clarke	1385	Aug 1919	0-6-0T	2167	Feb 1953	

== See also ==
- Great Western Railway in West Wales
