= Stradey =

Area of Llanelli, Wales

Coordinates: 51°41′31″N 4°10′44″W

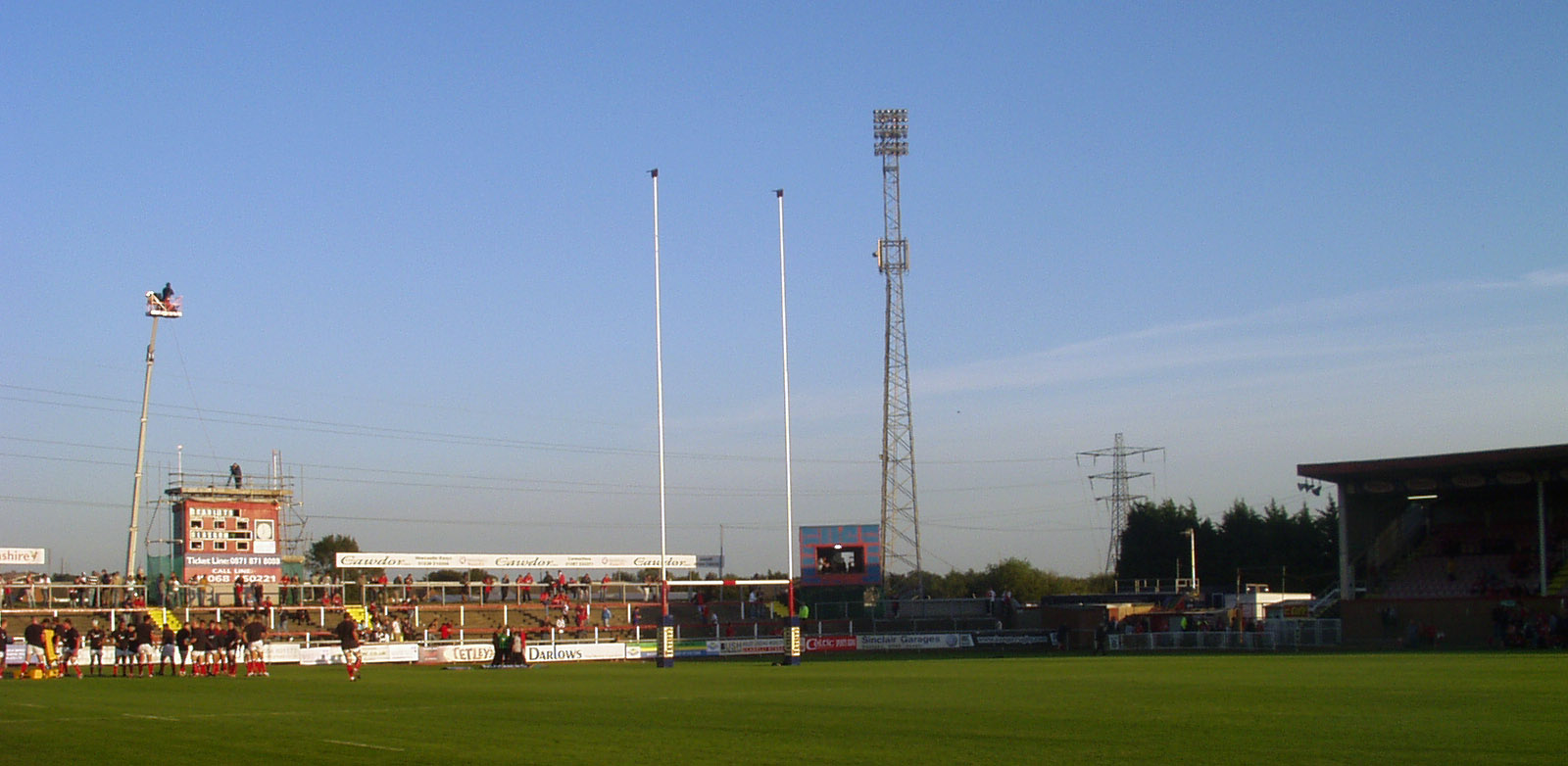
The goalposts at Stradey Park

Stradey (Welsh: Y Strade) is an area of the town of Llanelli in the county of Carmarthenshire in Wales, home to Stradey Park, where the Llanelli RFC and Llanelli Scarlets rugby teams were formerly based. Stradey is also home to the town's only Welsh language secondary school, Ysgol y Strade.
