= Penceilogi =

Village in Carmarthenshire, Wales

Coordinates: 51.686°N 4.124°W

- Village
- Location within Carmarthenshire
- Principal area: Carmarthenshire
- Country: Wales
- Sovereign state: United Kingdom
- Police: Dyfed-Powys
- Fire: Mid and West Wales
- Ambulance: Welsh

Penceilogi (standard Welsh: Penceiliogi or historically Pen-ceiliogi) is a small village on the northern outskirts of Llanelli, Carmarthenshire, Wales. It is bordered by Bryn to the east, Dafen to the north-west, Pemberton to the west and Cwmcarnhywel to the south. Administratively it lies within the community of Llanelli Rural and occupies the spur between the Dafen and Cwm Carnhywel valleys, its streets stepping up from about 40 m to 90 m above sea level on the flanks of Bryn hill. The built-up area merges westwards into Pemberton and eastwards into Bryn, while minor lanes give south-facing views towards the Burry Inlet. Llanelli Rural as a whole recorded 23,058 residents at the 2021 census, making it the most populous rural community in Wales and the largest population cluster outside the town's historic borough limits.

The modern settlement is almost entirely twentieth- and twenty-first-century housing. Early expansion came with inter-war council cottages on Gors Fach and Bryncoch Road, but the decisive change was the post-2000 allocation of several large green-field sites in the county's Local Development Plan. A 14.5-acre parcel at Llys y Bryn (site GA2/h56) was reserved for up to 145 dwellings, while the adjacent plateau at Y Waun secured outline permission in 2013 for 26 bungalows and, in 2021, for a mixed scheme of up to 202 homes with landscaped open space and sustainable-drainage features. The council's 2024 evidence to the revised LDP notes that the Y Waun project will be accessed off Nant-y-Gro, is within walking distance of frequent bus routes 110/111 to Swansea and Llanelli town centre, and is expected to deliver the policy requirement of twenty-five per cent affordable units.

Local services remain limited. Primary education is provided a little under 1 km east at Bryn C.P. School on Gelli Road; an Estyn monitoring visit in October 2021 judged the school to have made "sufficient progress" and removed it from special-measures status. Small convenience shops cluster on the Bryn–Penceilogi ridge, but most residents rely on the retail park and railway station at Bynea or the shopping streets of central Llanelli 3 km to the south-west. Footpaths and cycle routes link the estate roads to the wooded valley of Nant Cwm-y-Glo, now designated informal open space within the wider Cwm y Nant strategic growth zone.
