= Llangennech =

Village and community in Carmarthenshire, Wales

Coordinates: 51.693°N 4.092°W

- Village
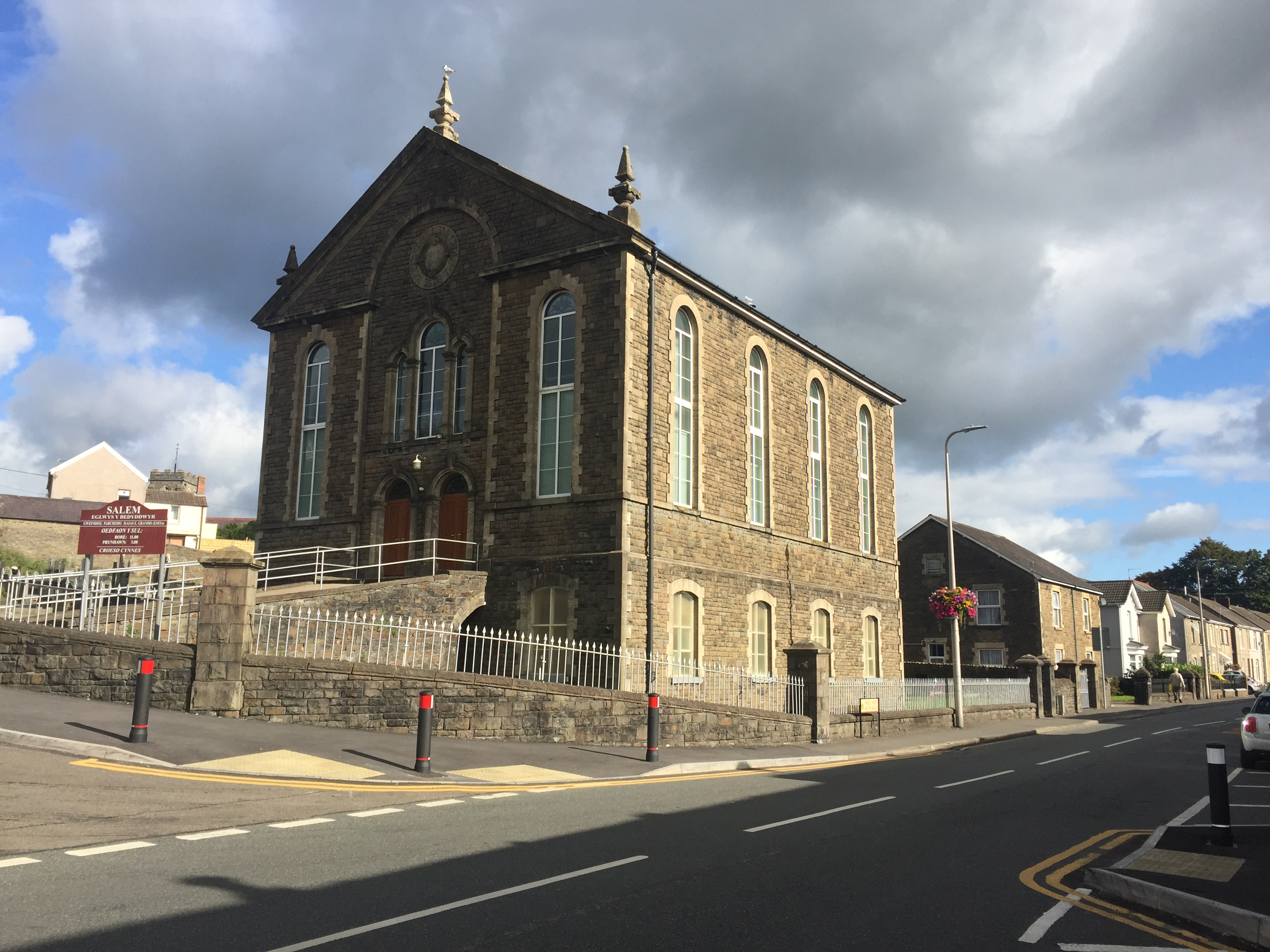
- Capel Salem in the village centre

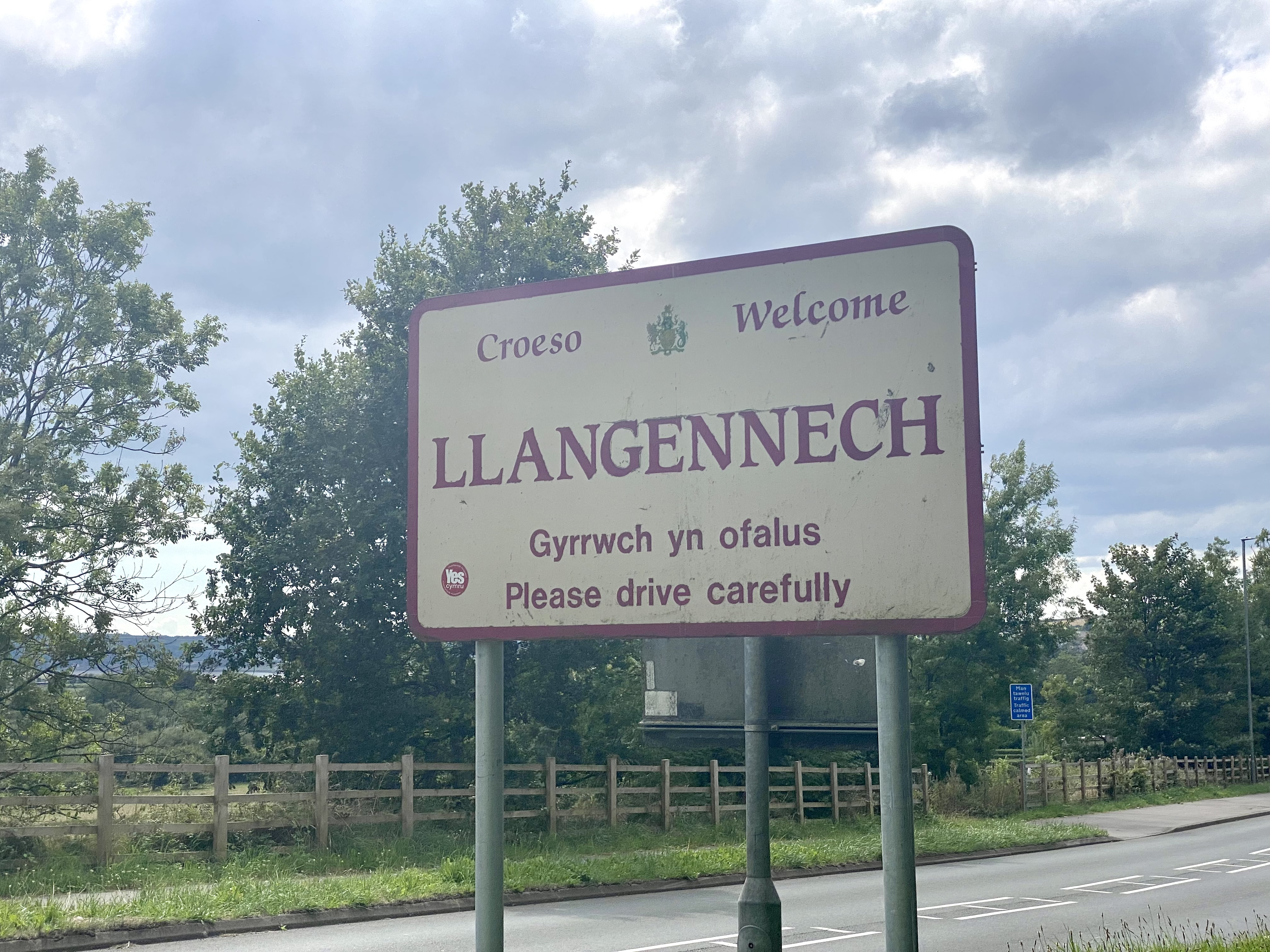
- A welcome sign to the village

- Location within Carmarthenshire
- Population: 5,153
- OS grid reference: SN560015
- Community: Llangennech
- Principal area: Carmarthenshire
- Preserved county: Dyfed
- Country: Wales
- Sovereign state: United Kingdom
- Post town: LLANELLI
- Postcode district: SA14
- Dialling code: 01554
- Police: Dyfed-Powys
- Fire: Mid and West Wales
- Ambulance: Welsh
- UK Parliament: Llanelli
- Senedd Cymru – Welsh Parliament: Llanelli

Llangennech (Welsh pronunciation: [ɬæn'ɡenəx]) is a village and community in the area of Llanelli, Carmarthenshire, Wales, which covers an area of 1,222 hectares (4.72 mi^{2}).

It is governed by Llangennech Community Council and Carmarthenshire County Council. Llangennech is also the name of the county electoral ward coterminous with the village. It falls in the Llanelli parliamentary and Senedd constituency. It lies in the Mid & West Wales region for regional Senedd members.

The village was a coal mining community, with several local collieries mining steam coal. There is also a large Labour tradition in the village originating with the mine workers. There was a large Royal Navy depot in the village, which was closed in 2007 in Ministry of Defence restructuring.

Llangennech has a strong rugby union team, Llangennech RFC, that feeds many players into Llanelli RFC and then on to the Llanelli Scarlets regional rugby union team.

The town is served by Llangennech railway station on the Heart of Wales Line with trains to Swansea to the south and Shrewsbury to the north.

The community is bordered by the communities of Llanelli Rural, Llannon, and Llanedi, all in Carmarthenshire; and by Grovesend and Waungron and Gorseinon in the City and County of Swansea.

== History ==
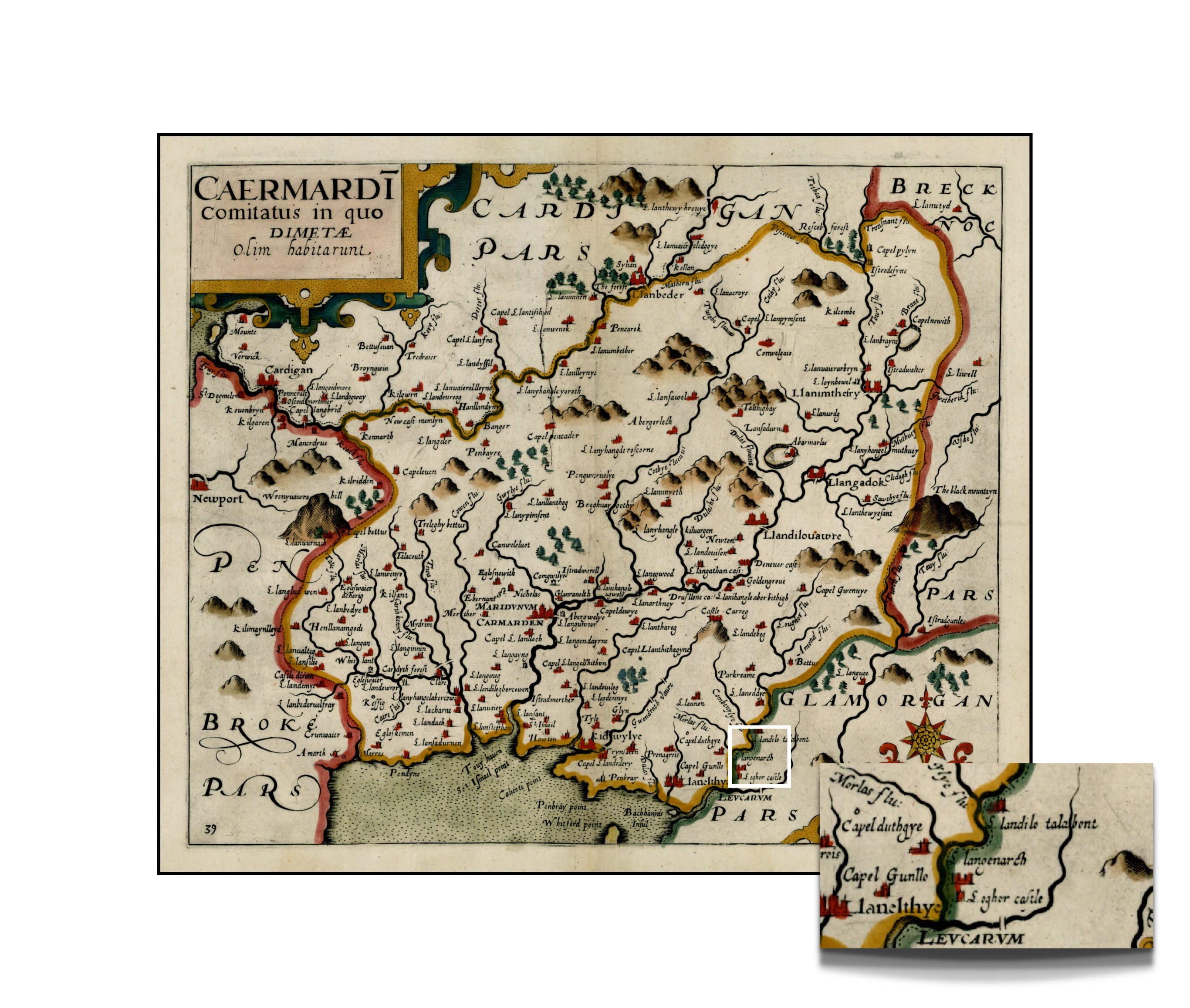
A Map of Carmarthenshire from c. 1607 – c. 1637 showing Llangennech as "Langenardh"

=== Etymology ===
The village has been known by many names over the years. These include Llangennydd, Llangennich, Llangenardh, Llangennach, Llangenarth, Llangenneth, Llangenyth, Llangennych and Langenardh. The likely origin of the village's name comes from the parish church, known as both St. Cennech's or St. Gwynnog's. The church is believed to have been dedicated to the brothers St. Cennydd and St. Gwynog, the sons of St. Gildas. Documents reveal that the village has commemorated St. Gwynog since at least the 16th century.

=== Llangennech Estate ===
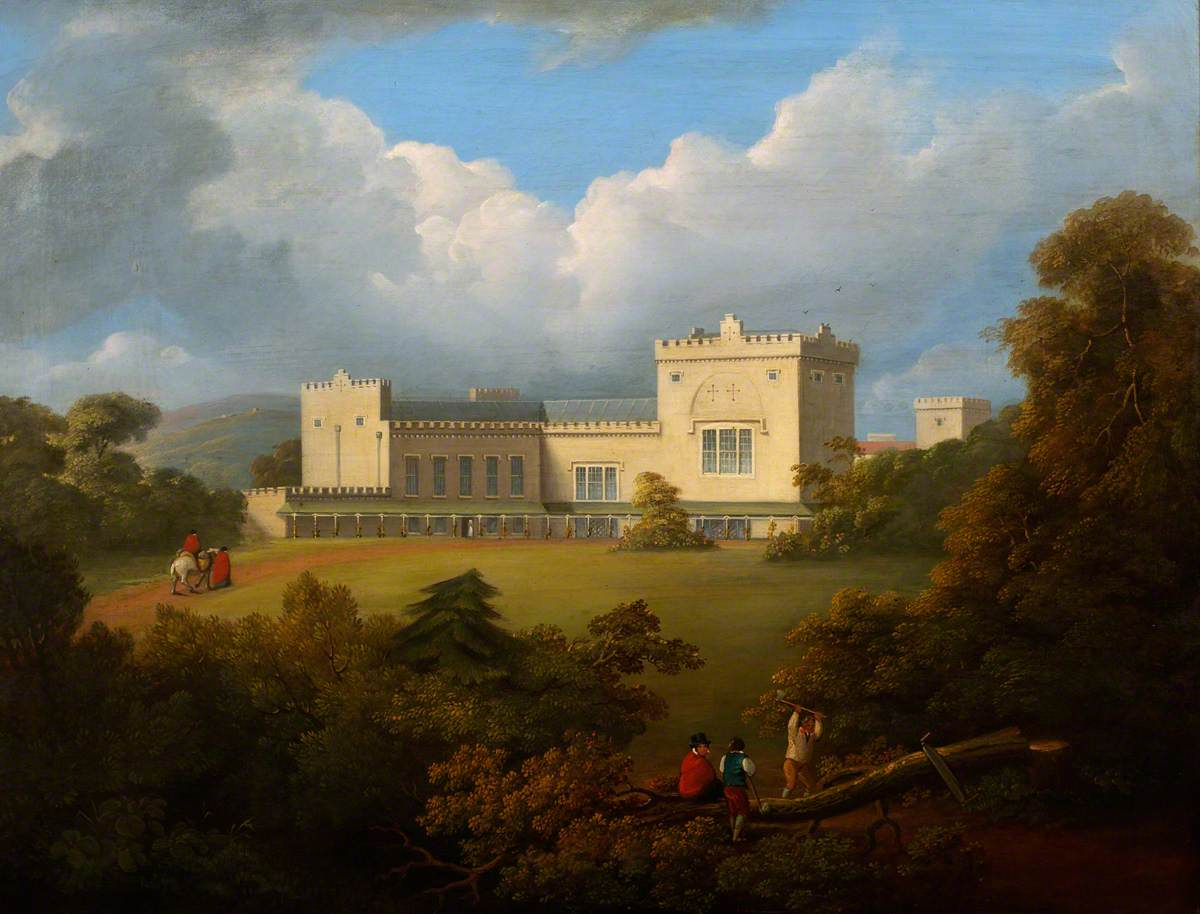
An oil painting of Llangennech Park House in 1832

The Llangennech Estate, covering around 4,000 acres of land, was formed between 1801 and 1803 when John Symmonds bought land from Sir John Stepney and various others. In 1804 it entered the hands of the Earl of Warwick and John Vancouver, brother of George Vancouver. After surrendering the estate back to Symmons in 1806, it was sold to the MP Edward Rose Tunno in 1821 or 1824. Tunno leased much of the estate. Thomas Margrave of the Llangennech Coal Company leased the "Llangennech Mansion" in 1826. The industrialist Richard Janion Nevill leased the mansion among other lands. He suffered a stroke at the Mansion and died the same day on 14 January 1856; his son and wife lived there until 1870. After Tunno's death, Edward Sartoris, Nevill's nephew and MP for Carmarthenshire, received the Llangennech estate. He went on to marry Nellie Grant, daughter of President Ulysses Grant.

Llangennech Park House was a country estate in what is now Maes Tŷ Gwyn. Attempts at securing protected site status were futile and it now stands abandoned.

=== The Rebecca Riots ===
On 28 June 1843, rioters attacked and destroyed the Bridge End toll gate, which stood near where The Bridge public house stands today.

Whilst this is the only recorded occurrence of the Rebecca Riots in the village, residents still took part in them elsewhere. The Welshman reported that the murderer of Sarah Williams, who is believed to be the only victim killed during the riots, was a "named shoemaker of Llangennech".

=== Industry ===
==== Coal ====
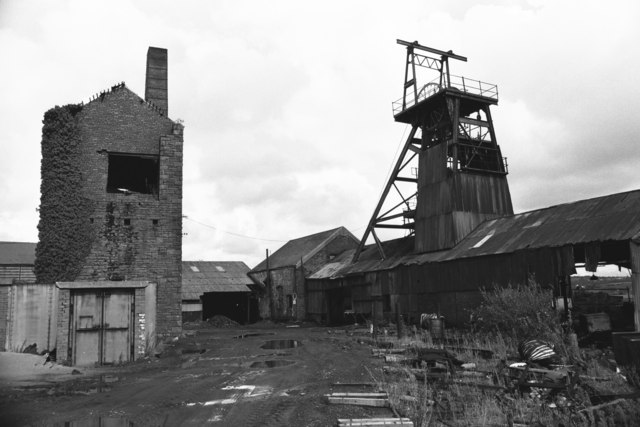
Morlais Colliery

The village's coal industry dates back to at least the 17th century, where the Duchy of Lancaster survey in 1609 talks of a Thomas Lloyd's "coleworks" in the Allt area of the village. "Llangennech Coal", as it was known, was used extensively around the world.

==== The 'RN' ====
The village was home to a Royal Navy Stores Depot colloquially known as the 'RN'. Over 1,000 workers were employed by the depot during the Second World War.

Its closure in 1988 exacerbated the unemployment caused by the closures of other industry in the area.

Though it no longer belongs to the Royal Navy, the site still operates as a contractor for the Ministry of Defence, helping to equip the Bronco All Terrain Tracked Carrier vehicles which were used by the British Army during the war in Afghanistan.

=== Aircraft crashes ===
- On 17 March 1992, a Piper PA-30-320 Twin Comanche aircraft carrying two passengers and one pilot crashed in Llangennech on its flight back to Haverfordwest. The pilot and front seat passenger sustained only minor injuries, but the other passenger suffered a broken neck. The aircraft was damaged beyond repair.
- During an air test flight of an English Electric Canberra on 13 January 1958, the engine failed, causing a steep dive to the ground. It crashed into marshland 200 yards from the railway station. The only occupant, Flight Lieutenant James Turnbull Wallace, was killed. He is buried at Llantwit Major Cemetery. The crash caused a thirty-foot (9 metre) crater. Eyewitnesses saw a flaming parachute in the air as the plane came crashing down. No one was attached. Part of the parachute was later found fifty yards from the crater.

== Demographics ==
Llangennech community's population was 4,964, according to the 2011 census; an increase of 10.07% since the 4,510 people noted in 2001. The 2019 ONS estimates put the population at 5,153.

The 2011 census showed 39.9% of the population could speak Welsh, a fall from 46.8% in 2001.

== Geography ==
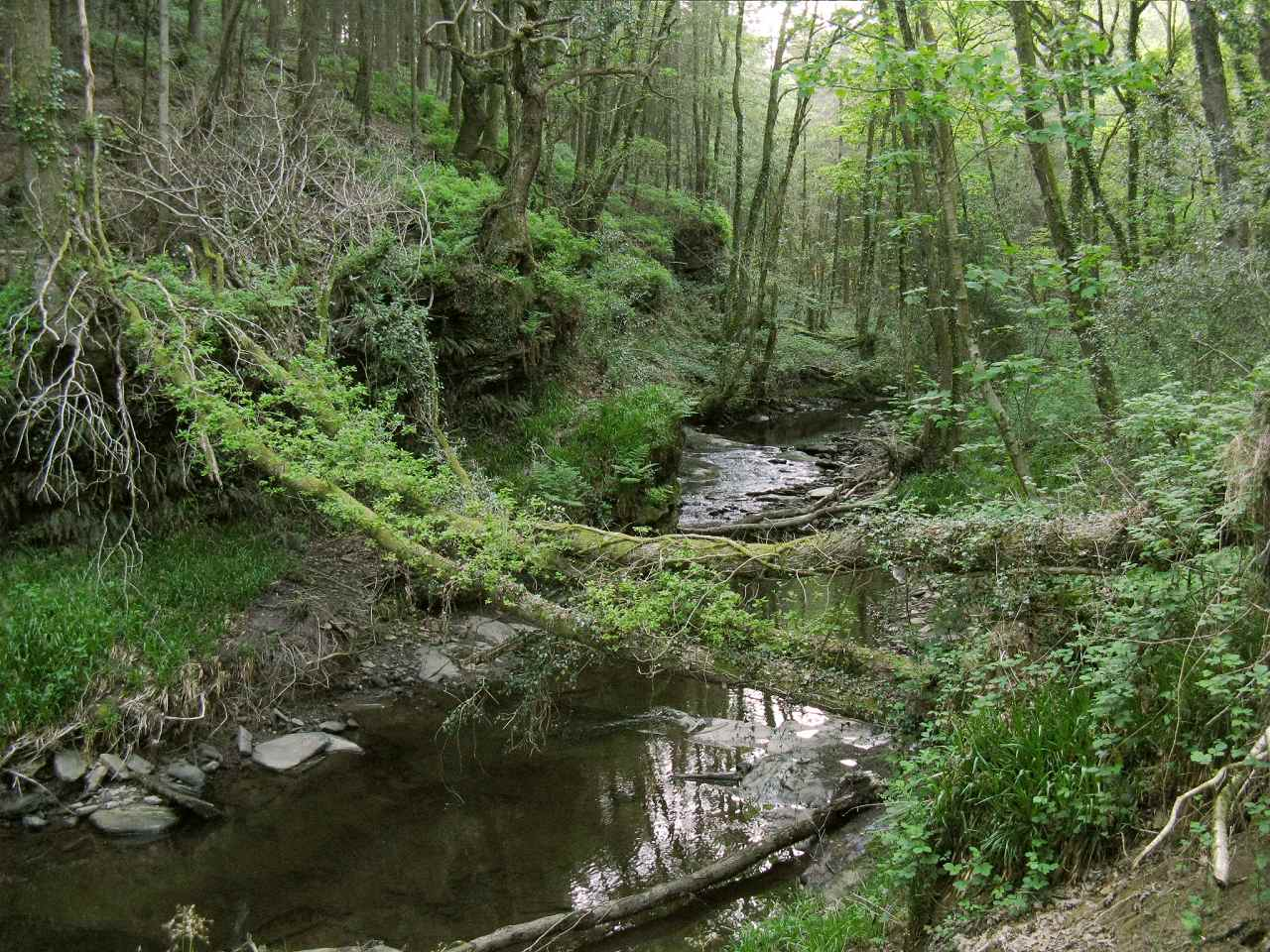
Afon Morlais flowing through Troserch Woods

The Afon Morlais runs through the village. The Troserch Woodlands lie near the Afon Morlais, approximately one mile to the north of the village. It is owned by the Troserch Woodland Society. The woodland received a community Green Flag award in 2021. The remains of the old Troserch Mill stands in the woodland.

Animals including otters, hedgehogs and species of reptile including grass snakes, the common lizard and adders have been recorded in the village.

== Governance ==
Llangennech is currently represented in the UK Parliament by Nia Griffith MP and in the Welsh Senedd by Lee Waters MS, both under the Llanelli constituency. Both are members of the Labour party.

Llangennech is also an electoral ward, coterminous with the community, which elects two county councillors to Carmarthenshire County Council. The village's county councillors elected in 2022 were Gary Jones and Jacqueline Seward.

=== Llangennech Community Council ===
On a community level, Llangennech is run by Llangennech Community Council. It currently seats 12 councillors who are elected on a quadrennial basis. Meetings are held in the Llangennech Community Centre and Bryn Hall.

== Transport ==
Llangennech is a commuter village - 85.1% of households own at least one car. The main thoroughfare of the village, the B4297, connects with the A4138 road - northeast from Hendy and southwest from Bryn - which itself connects with junction 48 of the M4.

Two bus services operate in the village: the L3 and L7. These are run by First Cymru. Residents complained about the reliability of these services, leading local politicians to secure promises from the operator that the services would improve.

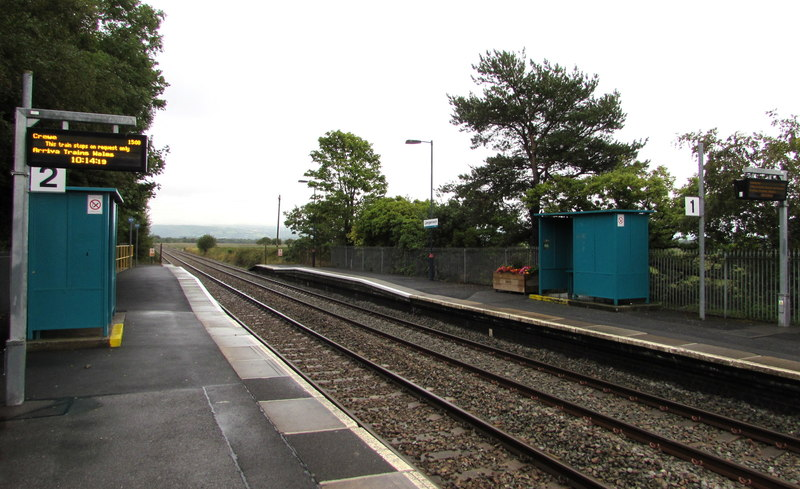
Llangennech railway station

Llangennech is served by the Heart of Wales line, with train services between Swansea and Shrewsbury. The franchise for the line is currently run by Transport for Wales (TfW).

=== Derailment incident ===
On 26 August 2020, ten tankers derailed near the village and spilled around 446,000 litres of fuel. The area of the spillage included a site of special scientific interest (SSSI) and a Special Area of Conservation (SAC). The incident caused major damage to these environments.

== Education ==
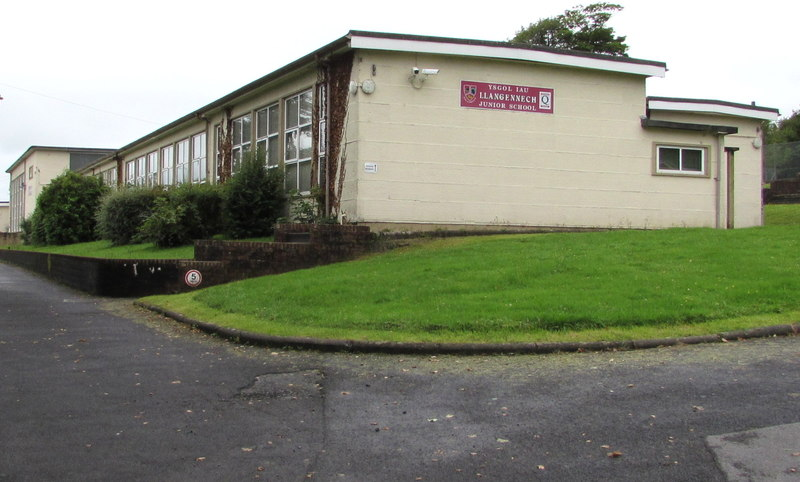
Ysgol Gymraeg Llangennech

Ysgol Gymraeg Llangennech is the only school in the village. As of 2021, there were 420 pupils on roll at the school.

It is notable for its choir, which has competed in the Urdd Eisteddfod and the BBC's Song of Praise's School Choir of the Year competition which it won in 2015.

In 2017, Carmarthenshire County Council voted 38–20 in favour of somewhat controversial plans for the school to switch from dual stream education to an exclusively Welsh-medium education.

The school historically feeds into Ysgol Gyfun y Strade and Bryngwyn Comprehensive School for secondary education.

== Religious sites ==
There are 4 religious sites in the village: Bryn Seion, Capel Bethesda, St Gwynog's and Capel Salem. The latter 3 all contain Grade II listed buildings. Bryn Seion, a Presbyterian chapel, was the subject of a book written by the local resident and renowned historian Hywel Teifi Edwards.

St Gwynog's contains a church built in 1908 at an estimated cost of £2,000. The architect was E. M. Bruce Vaughan. Officially it is known as St Gwynog's, though it has also been known as St Cennych's. The site of St Gwynog's has been home to a church since 1345.

== Sports ==
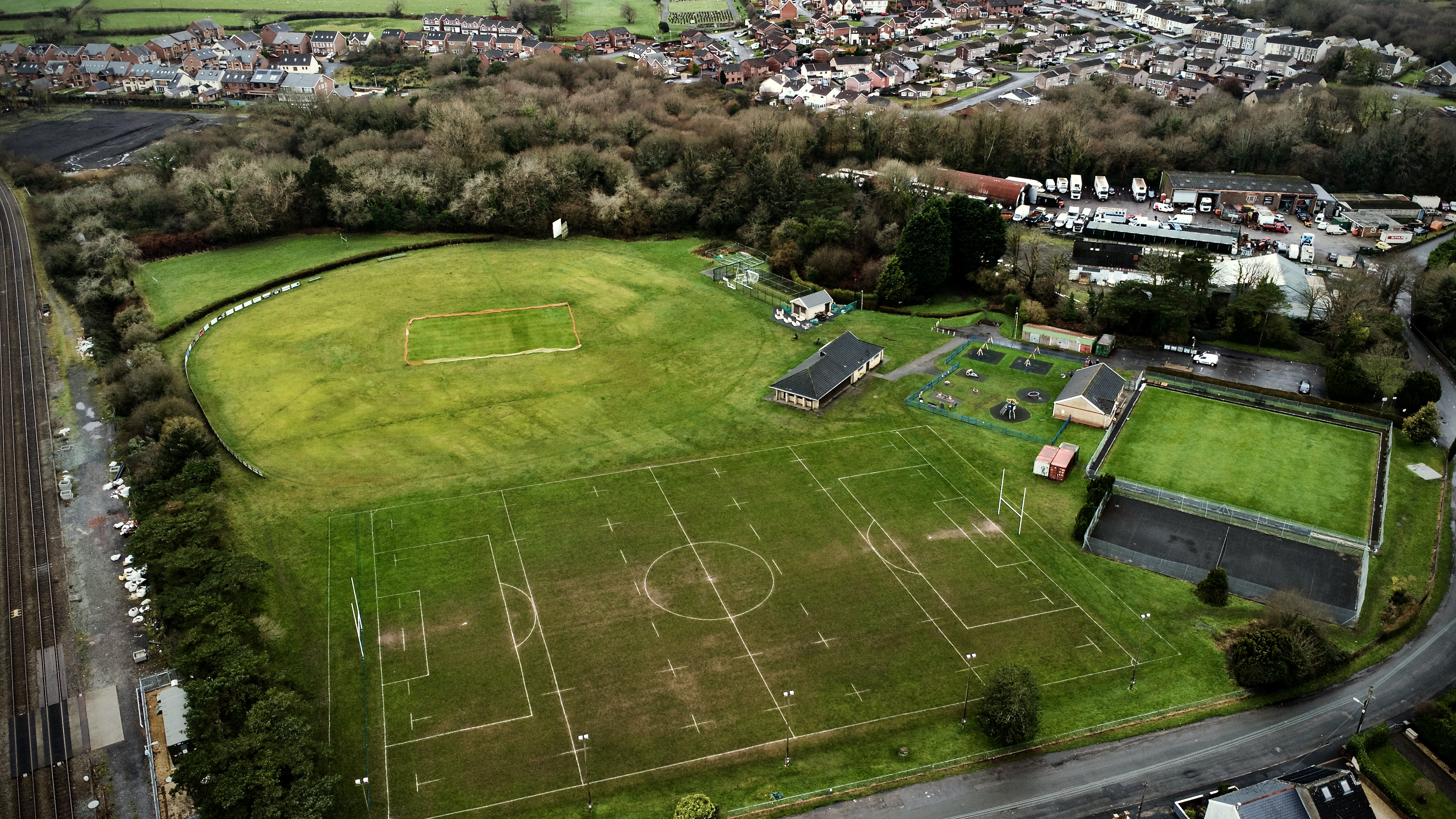
The grounds where local sports are played

In late 2018, the Llangennech and Bryn Sports Association (LBSA) was formed. It is a charitable organisation focused on promoting sports in the villages of Llangennech and Bryn, and lobbying for better sporting facilities.

=== Rugby ===
The village's rugby team is Llangennech RFC. There are a range of age groups able to play, and the main team play in the WRU Division One West league. Notable players include the bodybuilder Flex Lewis.

=== Football ===
The village is represented in football by Llangennech AFC in the Carmarthenshire League.

=== Cricket ===
Cricket made its way to the village in 1881. It is currently represented by Llangennech Cricket Club. It has three senior sides, all playing in the South Wales Cricket Association's leagues. In 2019 the club won both the All Wales Sport midweek league and cup.

=== Bowls ===
There is a bowling green in the village used by the Llangennech & Bryn bowls club.

== Notable residents ==
- Eileen Beasley, Welsh language campaigner, lived here during her and her husband's campaign for Welsh language tax bills
- Harry Jones, cricketer
- Huw Edwards, former BBC News presenter, lived in the village during his youth
- Hywel Teifi Edwards, Welsh historian, lecturer and author, lived in the village
- Rhys Gabe, Welsh international rugby player was born in Llangennech
- Tristan Garel Jones, Conservative politician who served as MP for Watford and later became a life peer. The family moved to Llangennech's Bridge Street when his father was posted to India during the Second World War. Jones attended the Welsh speaking village school. They lived above their uncle's newsagent shop.
- Steffan Jones, cricketer and coach for the Rajasthan Royals
- Richard Janion Nevill, industrialist who lived at Llangennech park.
