= Trostre A.F.C. =

Association football club in Wales

Trostre
- Full name: Trostre Association Football Club
- Founded: 1954
- Ground: Trostre Works (Tata Steel)
- Chairman: Steve Wells
- League: Carmarthenshire League Premier Division
- 2025–26: Carmarthenshire League Premier Division, 1st of 10

Trostre A.F.C. are a Welsh football club from Trostre, Carmarthenshire in West Wales. They currently play in the Carmarthenshire League Premier Division.

== History ==
The club were formed after raising a team from the British Steel tinplate works. They are the most successful team in the league, having been top flight (first division/ premier division) champions fourteen times.

The club changed its name from Trostre Sports to Trostre AFC.

== Honours ==
- Carmarthenshire League Division One/ Premier Division - Champions (14): 1955–56; 1987–88; 1988–89; 1991–92; 1995–95; 1996–97; 1997–98; 1998–99; 2001–02; 2005–06; 2006–07; 2016–17, 2019–20, 2021–22
- Carmarthenshire League Division Two - Champions (1): 1954–55
- Carmarthenshire League Division Three - Champions (2): 1972–73; 2011–12
- Carmarthenshire Senior Cup - Winners (5): 2000–01; 2005–06; 2006–07; 2015–16, 2021–22, 2025–26
- Carmarthenshire Senior Cup - Runners–up: 2022–23
- T G Davies Cup - Winners (6): 1963–64; 1997–98; 2000–01; 2005–06; 2006–07; 2016–17
- Challenge Cup - Winners (2): 2011–12; 2013–14
- Darch Cup - Winners (2): 2001–02; 2005–06
- Darch Cup - Runners-Up: 2021–22 (reserves)
- J Stephens Cup - Winners (1): 2016–17 (reserves)
- West Wales Intermediate Cup – Winners: 1988–89
- West Wales Intermediate Cup – Runners-Up: 1986–87; 1991–92, 2021–22
