= Dafen Welfare A.F.C. =

Association football club in Wales

Dafen Welfare
- Full name: Dafen Welfare Association Football Club
- Nickname: The Bluebirds
- Founded: 1925
- Ground: Dafen Park
- League: West Wales Premier League
- 2025–26: West Wales Premier League, 16th of 16 (relegated)

Dafen Welfare A.F.C. is a Welsh football club from Dafen, a village just outside Llanelli in Carmarthenshire, Wales. They play in the West Wales Premier League with their ground located at Dafen Park.

== History ==
For the 2020–21 season the club joined the newly formed tier four West Wales Premier League.

== Honours ==
- Carmarthenshire League Premier Division (Tier 1 of Carmarthenshire League) - Champions (1): 1984–85
- Carmarthenshire League Division One (Tier 1) - Champions (6): 1925–26; 1935–36; 1946–47; 1947–48; 1950–51; 1951–52
- Carmarthenshire League Division Two (Tier 2) - Champions (2): 1997–98; 2000–01
- Carmarthenshire League Division Three (Tier 4) - Champions (1): 1974–75
- Carmarthenshire League Division Four - Champions (2): 1976–77; 1983–84 (reserves)
- Carmarthenshire Senior Cup - Winners (7): 1927–28; 1946–47; 1952–53; 1974–75; 1976–77; 1981–82; 1988–89
- Carmarthenshire Senior Cup - Runners-Up (5): 1953–54; 1979–80; 2001–02; 2003–04; 2008–09
- Carmarthenshire League T G Davies Cup - Champions (2): 2011–12; 2013–14
- Carmarthenshire League T G Davies Cup - Runners-Up (2): 2003–04; 2010–11
- Carmarthenshire League Darch Cup - Winners (5): 1945–46; 1981–82; 2003–04; 2007–08; 2008–09
- Carmarthenshire League Darch Cup - Runners-Up (3): 1976–77; 1984–85; 2001–02
- League Shield (2): 1936–37; 1945–46
- West Wales Intermediate Cup – Winners: 2011–12
