= Hengoed (Carmarthenshire electoral ward) =

Electoral ward in Carmarthenshire, Wales

Coordinates: 51.699°N 4.186°W

Hengoed is an electoral ward for Carmarthenshire County Council and Llanelli Rural Council in Llanelli Rural, Carmarthenshire, Wales.

The ward is to the west of the town of Llanelli. The ward covers the villages of Furnace, Pwll, Sandy and most of the valley of the River Dulais. The population of this ward at the 2011 census was 3,745.

== Representation ==
Hengoed was a ward to Llanelli Borough Council from 1973, represented by three borough councillors until the 1987 election, when the representation reduced to two councillors.

Hengoed became an electoral ward to Dyfed County Council, electing a Labour Party councillor Hugh Peregrine at the 1989 and 1993 elections.

Since 1995 Hengoed has been an electoral ward to Carmarthenshire County Council, electing two county councillors, a mixture of Labour Party, Plaid Cymru and People First representatives.

Hengoed is also one of the community wards to Llanelli Rural Council, electing four community councillors.

Labour county and community councillor, Penny Edwards, had been elected as Hengoed county councillor in 2015, following the death of her husband George Edwards. She was subsequently elected to the community council in 2017. She was unable to stand for re-election in May 2022 because of ill health and died a short while afterwards, on 22 May 2022.

== Carmarthenshire County Council elections ==
* retiring councillor in the ward standing for re-election

=== 2017 election ===
Susan Phillips gained a seat back for Plaid Cymru at this election. She had been the Post Mistress of Pwll Post Office for 15 years and was born and bred in the ward.

Carmarthen CC election, 4 May 2017
Party	Candidate	Votes	%	±%
Labour	Penelope Edwards*	408		
Plaid Cymru	Susan Phillips	394		
Independent	Siân Caiach*	372		
Labour	Keith Davies	322		
Plaid Cymru	Martin Davies	315		
Independent	Clifford Jones	304		
Conservative	Kevin Flynn	230		
Labour hold		Swing		
Plaid Cymru gain from People's Voice				

=== 2015 by-election ===
A by election was held following the death of Labour county councillor George Edwards. It was won for Labour by his widow, Penny Edwards.

Hengoed by-election, 19 February 2015
Party	Candidate	Votes	%	±%
Labour	Penelope Edwards	335		
Plaid Cymru	Martin Davies	313		
UKIP	Bramwell Gordon Richards	152		
People's Voice	Wynford Samuel	80		
Independent	Edward Skinner	76		
Conservative	Stephen Davies	54		
Majority		22		
Turnout			35.32	
Labour hold		Swing		
