= Nant Morlais =

The Nant Morlais may refer to:

- Afon Morlais, a river running from Crosshands to the estuary of the River Loughor
- Nant Morlais, the tributary of the River Taff from Ponsticill reservoir to the Taff Fawr in Merthyr Tydfil
