= Gorseinon Athletic A.F.C. =

Association football club in Wales

Gorseinon Athletic
- Full name: Gorseinon Athletic Association Football Club
- Founded: 1963
- Ground: Parc y Werin
- Chairman: Ian Bamford
- League: Carmarthenshire League Division Two
- 2024–25: Carmarthenshire League Division Two, 5th of 10

Gorseinon Athletic A.F.C. are a Welsh football club from Gorseinon, in the City and County of Swansea in Wales. They currently play in the Carmarthenshire League Division Two.

== History ==
Gorseinon Athletic A.F.C. was founded in 1963 by Mel Williams.

The club is one of the most successful teams in the league, having been champions of the top division nine times. This included a double in the 1985–86 season of the league and Carmarthenshire Senior Cup. In the following season they again won the league, beating Garden Suburbs on goal difference. Gorseinon also won the league in 1990–91.

== Honours ==
- Carmarthenshire League Premier Division (Tier 1 of Camrthenshire League) - Champions (9): 1972–73; 1973–74; 1974–75; 1975–76; 1981–82; 1982–83; 1985–86; 1986–87; 1990–91
- Carmarthenshire Senior Cup - Winners (8): 1968–69; 1972–73; 1975–76; 1983–84; 1984–85; 1985–86; 1986–87; 2017–18
- West Wales Intermediate Cup – Runner-Up: 1974–75
