= Llwynhendy =

Village in Carmarthenshire, Wales

Coordinates: 51°40′40″N 4°06′45″W

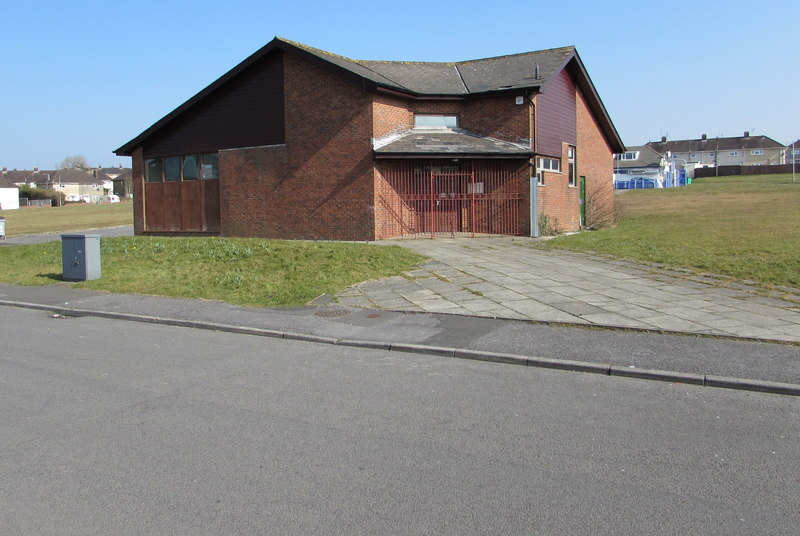
- Llwynhendy Library

- Location within Carmarthenshire
- Population: 4,276
- Principal area: Carmarthenshire
- Country: Wales
- Sovereign state: United Kingdom
- Post town: LLANELLI
- Postcode district: SA14
- Police: Dyfed-Powys
- Fire: Mid and West Wales
- Ambulance: Welsh
- UK Parliament: Llanelli
- Senedd Cymru – Welsh Parliament: Llanelli

Llwynhendy (sometimes spelled Llwyn-Hendy), is a village and ward near the town of Llanelli in Carmarthenshire, Wales. The ward, which includes the village, as well as Cefncaeau, parts of Cwmcarnhywel and parts of Bryn and Penceilogi, had a population of 4,276.

It is bordered by Bynea, Cwmcarnhywel, Cefncaeau and Pen-y-graig. It is an old village with strong industrial roots. The (now closed) steel-works in nearby Bynea was a major employer until the decline of the steel industry. The village is 50 ft above sea level and is based around the Nant Caerhuan that finds its source in nearby Gelli Farm, Bryn, Llanelli. The nearby Wildfowl & Wetlands Trust site in the old Penclacwydd farm near the village is the only wetland wildlife trust centre in the whole of Wales.

== History ==
People have been living in the Llwynhendy area since Neolithic times. During the Iron Age the Llwynhendy and Bynea area was an important place as it was the river crossing of the River Loughor (Welsh: Afon Llwchwr) for the Romans. The main Roman Road ran through the villages and is now still in use as the main road which includes Pemberton Road, Heol Llwynhendy, Heol Tanygraig, Heol Cwmfelin, Heol Y Bwlch and Yspitty Road. This may have carried on into the early Middle Ages as the village may have bordered the regions of Ystrad Tywi and Glywysing.

Llwynhendy was also an important place for pilgrims on the way to the Saint David's Cathedral in Pembrokeshire. Opposite Saint David's church in Llwynhendy stood Capel Dewi ("St David's Chapel"), a chapel of rest/ease where pilgrims travelling could stop. Today only ruins remain.

Llwynhendy became a mining village during the industrial revolution, with Tirmynydd, Hendre, Trallwm and Pencoed mines being opened. However it has always been an agricultural area as well and to this day there are many farms surrounding the village.

With the mines closing during the 1940s and 50s less work was available, until Trostre Works opened. With more people needed two council estates between Llwynhendy and Pemberton were constructed on the lands of Heol Hen Farm and Brynsierfel Farm. Cwmcarnhywel and Cefncaeau estates are locally known as the Top or bottom site (Welsh-Maesydd Pen a Gwaelod) and they are villages of their own, but are sometimes considered part of Llwynhendy.

== Notable people ==
- Douglas Bassett (1927–2009), geologist and a director of the National Museum of Wales from 1977 to 1985.
- Terry Davies MBE (1933–2021), rugby player for Swansea and Llanelli, with 21 caps for Wales

== Welsh language ==
The Welsh language is spoken by over half of the villagers, with Ysgol Gymraeg Brynsierfel in nearby Cwmcarnhywel the area's Welsh school. Historically Welsh has been the dominant language of the village, and up until the mid-1900s spoken by all of its population.

== Religion ==
Llwynhendy is served by three places of worship - Capel Soar, Capel Y Tabenacl and St. Davids Church (Welsh: Eglwys Dewi Sant). Recently closed Capel Nazareth on Parc Gitto was the place of worship for the Methodists. Before baptism was legal in Great Britain, the baptists of the Llwynhendy area used to meet in Tŷ Cwrdd Farm (lit. 'meeting place farm') on Heol Hendre, Llwynhendy.

== Education ==
Llwynhendy is served by two schools. Ysgol Gymraeg Brynsierfel, the Welsh school in nearby Cwmcarnhywel, and Ysgol Bryn Teg, the English school, which is the old Llwynhendy School.
