= Llanelli (disambiguation) =

Llanelli is a town in Wales.

Llanelli may also refer to:

== Places ==
- Llanelli (UK Parliament constituency), a constituency of the House of Commons of the Parliament of the United Kingdom
- Llanelli (Senedd constituency), a constituency of the Senedd
- Llanelli Rural, a community in Carmarthenshire, Wales
- Llanelli (district), a former local government district in Wales

== Other ==
- Llanelli RFC, the Welsh town's rugby union club, now feeder to and owner of the Scarlets regional side
- Llanelli A.F.C., a former Welsh football club

== See also ==
- Llanelly, a village and its respective parish
