= Llanelli Rural =

Community in Carmarthenshire, Wales

Coordinates: 51.683°N 4.130°W

- Community
- Location within Carmarthenshire
- Principal area: Carmarthenshire
- Country: Wales
- Sovereign state: United Kingdom
- Police: Dyfed-Powys
- Fire: Mid and West Wales
- Ambulance: Welsh
- List of places UK Wales Carmarthenshire Map of the community

Llanelli Rural (Welsh: Llanelli Gwledig) is a community in the southeast of Carmarthenshire, Wales.

== Description ==
Despite its name, Llanelli Rural covers large parts of the Llanelli urban area, including Bynea, Llwynhendy, Cefncaeau, Pemberton, Bryn, Cwmcarnhywel, Cwmbach, Cynheidre, Penygraig, Penceilogi, Dafen, Felinfoel, Swiss Valley, along with the villages of Pont-Henri, Pontiets, Pwll, and Five Roads, as well as a number of hamlets. The community surrounds Llanelli, except at the coast.

According to the 2001 census it had a population of 21,043, increasing to 22,800 at the 2011 Census.

Llanelli Rural is bordered by the communities of: Llanelli; Pembrey and Burry Port Town; Trimsaran; Llangyndeyrn; Pontyberem; Llannon; and Llangennech, all being in Carmarthenshire; and by: Gorseinon; Llwchwr; Gowerton; Llanrhidian Higher; and Llanrhidian Lower, all being in the City and County of Swansea.

== Llanelli Rural Council ==
Llanelli Rural Council Cyngor Gwledig Llanelli

Type
- Type: Community council

Leadership
- Leader: Cllr. Susan Lewis, Labour
- Deputy Leader: Cllr. Edward Skinner, Labour
- Chair: Cllr. Susan Lewis, Labour
- Vice Chair: Cllr. Michelle Donoghue, Labour
- Seats: 21

Meeting place
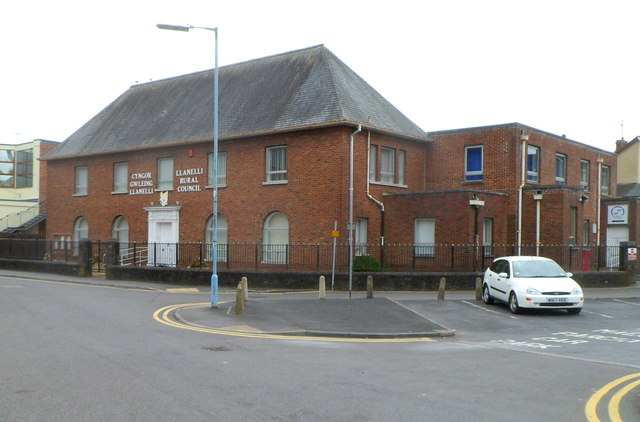
- Vauxhall Buildings, Vauxhall, Llanelli

Website
- www.llanelli-rural.gov.uk

Llanelli Rural Community Council governs the area at a community level. The council headquarters is located in Llanelli town centre.

In 2013/14 Llanelli Rural Council received £959,530 via the council tax precept, the highest of any community council in Wales.

=== Current Composition (after the May 2022 election and 2025 by elections) ===
Group affiliation	Members
Labour	8
Plaid Cymru	6
Independent	7
Vacant	0
Total	21

Following the previous full election on 4 May 2017 the council composition was:

Group affiliation	Members
Labour	13
Plaid Cymru	4
Independent	4
Total	21

Following the election in May 2022 the council elected Cllr. Susan Lewis as leader and Cllr. Edward Skinner as deputy leader.

Following the 2 by elections in 2025 Cllr Alex Evans put forward a motion of 'no confidence' in the leader Cllr Susan Lewis in an effort to take control. The motion was lost in a council meeting and Cllr Lewis remains leader of Council with the support of members from all groups across the chamber.

=== Election history ===
==== 2017 election ====
Ward	Party	Rural councillors elected - May 2017
Bynea	Labour	Stephen Donoghue
Bynea	Labour	Michelle Donoghue
Bynea	Labour	Ian Wooldridge
Dafen	Independent	Sharen Davies
Dafen	Labour	Tegwen Devichand
Dafen	Labour	Susan Lewis
Dafen	Labour	Andrew Rogers
Felinfoel	Labour	John Evans
Felinfoel	Labour	Bill Thomas
Glyn	Independent	Jim Jones
Glyn	Independent	Carol Rees
Hengoed	Independent	Sian Caiach
Hengoed	Plaid Cymru	Martin Davies
Hengoed	Labour	Bethan Williams
Hengoed	Plaid Cymru	Jennifer Susan Phillips
Pemberton	Labour	Fozia Akhtar
Pemberton	Labour	Jason Peter Hart
Pemberton	Labour	Rafia Najmi
Pemberton	Labour	Ella Simmons
Swiss Valley	Independent	Giles Morgan
Swiss Valley	Conservative	Jordan Spencer Randall

==== 2021 By-elections ====
Councillors Mina Najmi and Ella Simmons left the council in 2020, leading to a by-election for their Pemberton ward seats on 6 May 2021. The by-election saw Christopher Beer (Labour) and Samantha Nurse (Independent) elected.

Following the death of Carol Rees in 2021, Alexander Evans (originally independent but joined Plaid Cymru soon after) was co-opted to serve as a member for the Glyn ward.

Although originally elected under a Labour ticket, Sharen Davies and Jason Hart left the party and became independent members in 2018 and 2021 respectively. Jordan Randall was originally elected as a Plaid Cymru candidate but moved to the Conservative party. Ian Wooldridge also crossed from Plaid Cymru to Labour during his term of office.

==== 2022 election ====
Ward	Party	Rural councillors elected - May 2022
Bynea	Labour	Deryk Cundy
Bynea	Labour	Michelle Donoghue
Bynea	Independent	Simon Ford
Dafen	Labour	Rob Evans
Dafen	Labour	Sue Lewis
Dafen	Labour	Andrew Rogers
Dafen	Labour	Neil Stephens
Felinfoel	Labour	Nysia Evans
Felinfoel	Labour	Eve Evans
Glyn	Plaid Cymru	Alex Evans
Glyn	Plaid Cymru	Owen Williams
Hengoed	Labour	Edward Skinner
Hengoed	Plaid Cymru	Susan Phillips
Hengoed	Labour	Bethan Williams
Hengoed	Plaid Cymru	Martin Davies
Pemberton	Independent	Sharen Davies
Pemberton	Independent	Jason Peter Hart
Pemberton	Independent	Samantha Nurse
Pemberton	Independent	Andrew Stephens
Swiss Valley	Independent	Giles Morgan
Swiss Valley	Independent	Stephen Bowen

==== 2025 By-elections ====
Following the sad passing of Neil Stephens (Labour) a by-election was held in the Dafen ward on March 27th which was won by Karl Morgan (Plaid Cymru)

Following the resignation of Bethan Williams (Labour) a by-election was held in the Hengoed ward on February 20th which was won by Jason Lovell (Plaid Cymru).

=== Chairs of Council ===
- 2025/26 Susan Lewis
- 2024/25 Martin Davies
- 2023/24 Susan Phillips
- 2022/23 Gyles Morgan
- 2021/22 Tegwen Devichand
- 2019/21 Sharen Davies
- 2018/19 Sian Caiach
- 2017/18 John Evans
- 2016/17 Stephen M Donoghue
- 2015/16 Martin Davies
- 2014/15 Lindy J Butlern
- 2013/14 Thomas J “Jim” Jones
- 2012/13 Tegwen Devichand
- 2011/12 Susan Lewis
- 2010/11 Sharen Davies
