= Len Davies (rugby union) =

Welsh rugby player

- Full name: Leonard Morris Davies
- Born: 29 December 1930 Bynea, Wales, U.K.
- Died: 23 September 1957 (aged 26) Morriston, Swansea, Wales, U.K.
- Notable relative: Terry Davies (brother)

Rugby union career
- Position: Wing-forward
International career
Years	Team	Apps	(Points)
1954–55	Wales	3	(0)

Leonard Morris Davies (29 December 1930 – 23 September 1957) was a Welsh international rugby union player.

== Biography ==
Born in Bynea, Davies was the elder brother of Wales and British Lions fullback Terry Davies.

Davies played for Llanelli and was a specialist blindside wing-forward. He was capped three times for Wales, making his debut in a win over France at Cardiff Arms Park during their 1954 Five Nations campaign.

After gaining his third cap against Ireland in 1955, Davies withdrew from the side to travel to Paris, having been said to be suffering from bronchitis. He remained in ill health over the next years and died at a hospital in Morriston in 1957.

== See also ==
- List of Wales national rugby union players
