= Bryn, Llanelli =

Village in Carmarthenshire, Wales

Coordinates: 51.686°N 4.103°W

Bryn: Welsh: Y Bryn
- Location within Carmarthenshire
- Community: Llanelli Rural
- Principal area: Carmarthenshire
- Preserved county: Dyfed
- Country: Wales
- Sovereign state: United Kingdom
- Post town: LLANELLI
- Postcode district: SA14
- Dialling code: 01554
- Police: Dyfed-Powys
- Fire: Mid and West Wales
- Ambulance: Welsh
- UK Parliament: Llanelli
- Senedd Cymru – Welsh Parliament: Llanelli

Bryn (locally known using the Welsh: Y Bryn; meaning: "the Hill") is a village situated east of Llanelli in Carmarthenshire, Wales. It is part of the Llanelli Rural (Welsh: Llanelli Wledig) community, and it borders with the villages of Llangennech, Dafen, Penceilogi, Pen-y-graig and Bynea. It is roughly 70m above sea level.

It is mainly a suburban area with surrounding farm land to the north and east. The village has its own school Ysgol Y Bryn, which is an English school. It is also home to St Michael's Independent Secondary School, Primary School and Sixth Form (Year 12 and 13). The Welsh schools are in the nearby villages of Llangennech and Cwmcarnhywel. The Welsh language is the dominant language with over half of the village's population able to speak it. The village sprang up during the 1960s when many more houses were built. Before that it was only a hamlet with a few farms.
