= Llangennech Community Council =

Community council in Carmarthenshire, Wales

Llangennech Community Council Cyngor Cymuned Llangennech

Type
- Type: Community Council of Llangennech

Structure
- Seats: 12
- Political groups: Labour (7) Plaid Cymru (5)
- Length of term: 4

Elections
- Last election: 5 May 2022; 2 years ago

Meeting place
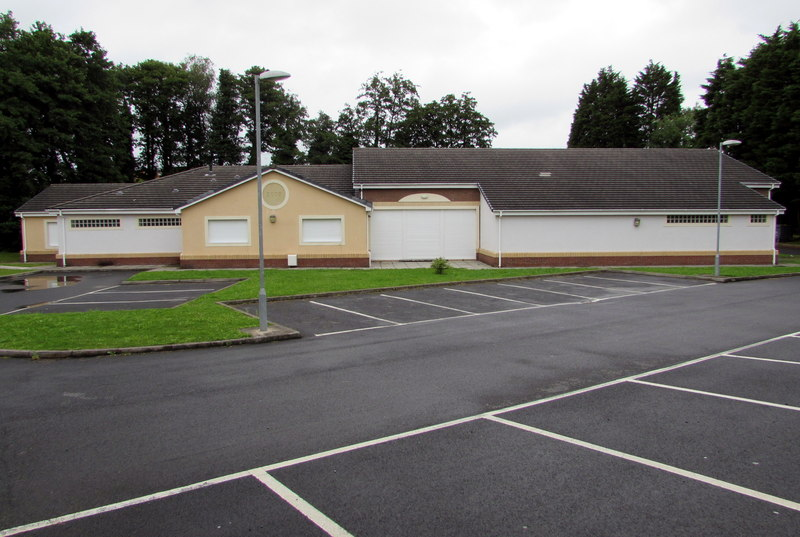
- Llangennech Community Centre
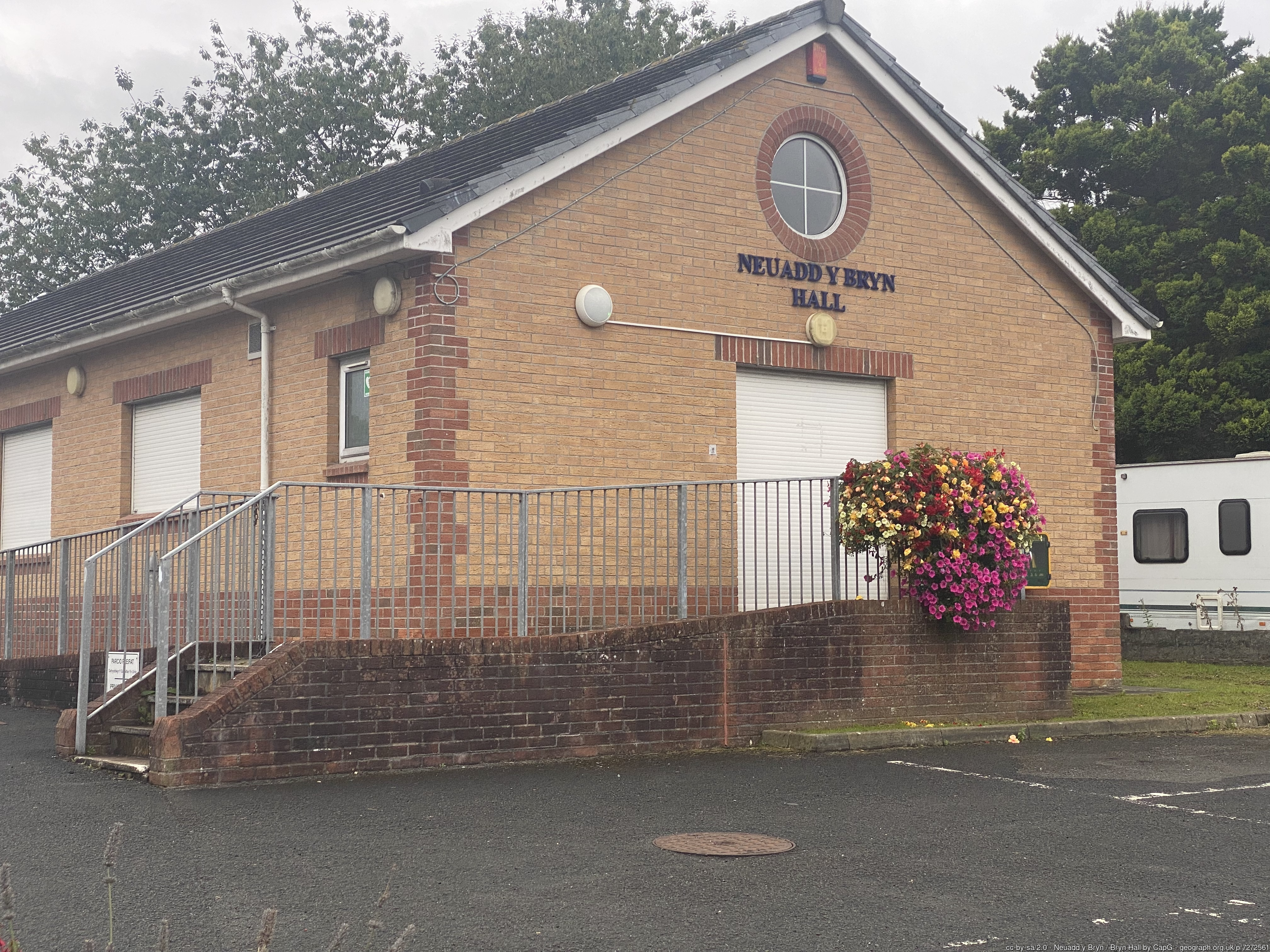
- Bryn Hall

Website
- llangennechcommunitycouncil.gov.uk

Llangennech Community Council (Welsh: Cyngor Cymuned Llangennech) is a community council that governs the communities of Bryn and Llangennech within the county of Carmarthenshire. The council was established under Section 27 of the Local Government Act 1974 replacing the previous civil parishes in Wales. It currently seats 12 councillors who are elected on a quadrennial basis. Meetings are held in the Llangennech Community Centre and Bryn Hall. It provides a range of local services including the management of community centres, parks, and a cemetery.

== Election history ==
=== 2022 Election ===
The 2022 Community Council election took place on Thursday 5 May 2022.

Name	Party
Armishaw, Lewis	Welsh Labour / Llafur Cymru
Davies, Hywel	Plaid Cymru – The Party of Wales
Griffiths, Iwan	Plaid Cymru – The Party of Wales
Jones, Gary	Welsh Labour / Llafur Cymru
Leeuwerke, Joanna	Welsh Labour / Llafur Cymru
Lloyd, Nikki	Welsh Labour / Llafur Cymru
Morgan, Lynda	Welsh Labour / Llafur Cymru
Parry, Andrea	Welsh Labour / Llafur Cymru
Seward, Jacqueline	Welsh Labour / Llafur Cymru
Slader, Marian	Plaid Cymru – The Party of Wales
Thomas, Gwyneth	Plaid Cymru – The Party of Wales
Williams, Ian Morlais	Plaid Cymru – The Party of Wales

Total votes: 12072

Turnout: 38.04%

=== 2017 Election ===
Name	Party
Pam Bevan	Plaid Cymru – The Party of Wales
Glendon Davies	Plaid Cymru – The Party of Wales
Bill Griffiths	Plaid Cymru – The Party of Wales
Dian Hopkins	Plaid Cymru – The Party of Wales
Gwyn Hopkins	Plaid Cymru – The Party of Wales
Gary Jones	Welsh Labour / Llafur Cymru
Gordon Lewis	Welsh Labour / Llafur Cymru
Selwyn Morgan	Plaid Cymru – The Party of Wales
Christopher Slader	Plaid Cymru – The Party of Wales
Marian Salder	Plaid Cymru – The Party of Wales
Gwyneth Thomas	Plaid Cymru – The Party of Wales
Ian Morlais Williams	Plaid Cymru – The Party of Wales

Turnout: 37.66%

== List of past Chair of the Council ==
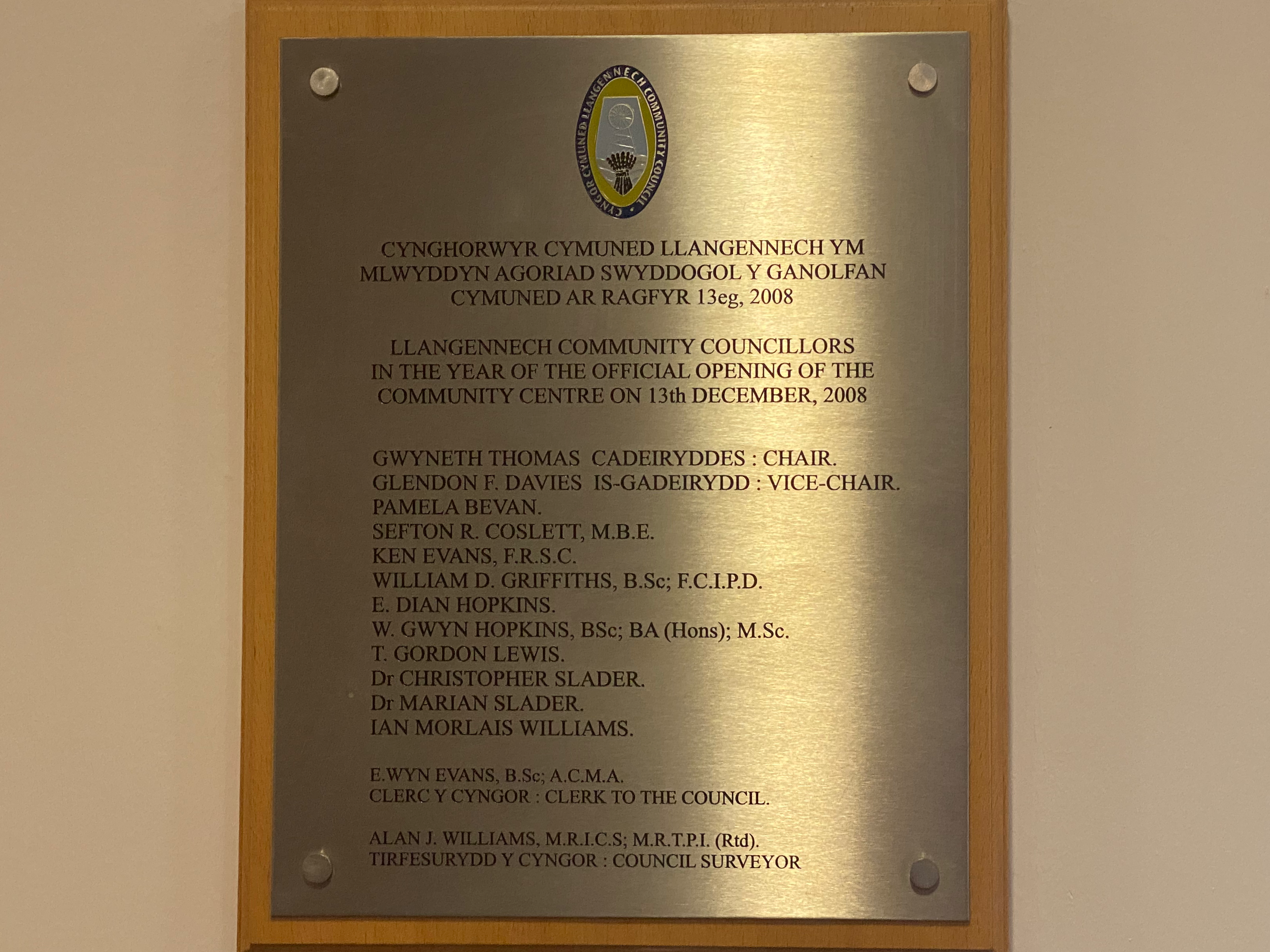
- A plague detailing the past chairs of the Council
  W G Hopkins (2015-2016)
- T G Lewis (2016-2017)
- W D Griffiths (2017-2018)
- J A Seward (2018-2019)
- G Thomas (2019-2020)
- G Thomas (2020-2021)
- N Lloyd (2021-2022)
- Ian Morlais Williams (2022-2023)
- Gary Robert Jones (2023-2024)

== Badge ==
Coat of arms of Llangennech Community Council
Badge Lozinge-shaped badge with a wheat sheaf and colliery wheel.
