= Bwlch Rangers A.F.C. =

Association football club in Wales

Bwlch Rangers
- Full name: Bwlch Rangers Association Football Club
- Nickname: The Welsh Lady
- Founded: 1926
- Ground: Glanmorfa Park
- Chairman: Darren Joce
- Manager: Jason Morris
- League: Carmarthenshire League Premier Division
- 2024–25: Carmarthenshire League Division One, 1st of 11 (promoted)

Bwlch Rangers A.F.C. are a Welsh football club from Llanelli, Carmarthenshire in West Wales. They play in the Carmarthenshire League Premier Division.

== History ==
Bwlch Rangers were founded in 1926. Their greatest success was in 1947–48 when they won the West Wales Amateur Cup. They also reached the final in the following season. However this club folded in 1973.

The club was reformed in 1975 under the guidance of Vernon Morgan. During the 1990s the club became an established Premier Division team, and had ambitions of joining the Welsh Football League. In 1999–2000 was their most successful season, becoming the first Carmarthenshire League team to win the treble. Since then the club had experienced many difficulties off the pitch, and in 2005 saw large change to their committee, aiming to make the running of the club smoother.

In 2015 Bwlch reached the semi-final of the West Wales Cup, but their run came to an abrupt end after a 6–1 loss to Team Swansea.

The club withdrew from the league in October 2022 citing lack of player numbers. The club confirmed in June 2023 that they would rejoin the league for the 2023–24 season.

== Honours ==
- Carmarthenshire League Premier Division (Tier 1) - Champions (2): 1999–2000; 2017–18
- Carmarthenshire League Division One (Tier 1) - Champions (6): 1937–38; 1949–50; 1952–53; 1953–54; 1956–57; 1957–58 (shared)
- Carmarthenshire League Division One (Tier 2) - Winners (2): 1990–91, 2024–25
- Carmarthenshire League Division Two (Tier 3) - Winners (4): 1976–77; 1981–82; 1987–88; 2023–24
- Carmarthenshire Senior Cup - Winners (11): 1932–33; 1933–34; 1936–37; 1948–49; 1949–50; 1950–51; 1953–54; 1955–56; 1958–59; 1999–2000; 2007–08
- Carmarthenshire League T G Davies Cup - Winners (10): 1947–48; 1948–49; 1950–51; 1951–52; 1952–53; 1976–77; 1977–78; 1994–95; 1999–2000; 2017–18
- Carmarthenshire League Challenge Cup - Winners (1): 1976–77, 1977–78, 1994–95
- Carmarthenshire League Darch Cup - Winners (2): 1990–91, 2010–11
- Carmarthenshire League Reserve Division One - Winners (1): 2000–01
- Carmarthenshire League Reserve Division Two - Winners (1): 1987–88
- West Wales Amateur Cup – Winners (1): 1947–48
- West Wales Amateur Cup – Runners-up (1): 1948–49
