= Evans & Williams A.F.C. =

Association football club in Wales

Evans & Williams
- Full name: Evans & Williams Sports Association Football Club
- Nickname: Albies
- Founded: 1960
- Ground: Coleg Sir Gâr 3G
- League: Ardal SW League
- 2024–25: Ardal SW League, 7th of 16
Home colours	Away colours

Evans & Williams Sports Association Football Club is a Welsh football team based in Llanelli, Carmarthenshire, Wales. They play in the Ardal SW League.

== History ==
The club was formed in the late 1950s by workers from the Evans and Williams Wagon Works. They are nicknamed "Albies" after Albie Evans who owned the works. They played their first competitive fixture on Saturday 20 August 1960 against Trostre Steel Works on Penygaer Fields, a match they won 4–2.

The club's first honours came in 1962–63 season when the club became the Carmarthenshire League Division Two champions. In the 1969–70 season they became the champions of the Carmarthenshire League Division 1 and also won J Stephens Cup, achieving the club's first league and cup double. Further honours came in 1972 when they won the Darch Cup and the Challenge Cup.

A long time without honours came to an end in 1992–93 as the club won the Carmarthenshire League Division 3. In 1998–99 they secured the Carmarthenshire League Division 1 title, gaining promotion to the Premier Division. Their next honour came in 2004 with the club's first Carmarthenshire Senior Cup.

The 2014–15 season saw the club's greatest success as they secured their first ever Carmarthenshire League Premier Division honours. On their way to the title the team scored 90 goals. They scored in every one of the 22 fixtures. A loss to rivals Loughor on 31 January left the club needing to win all 11 of their remaining fixtures. They achieved this scoring 59 goals and conceding only 11.

For the 2020–21 season the club joined the inaugural season of the West Wales Premier League, the new tier 4 league run by the West Wales Football Association.

== Honours ==
- West Wales Premier League – Runners-up: 2023–24
- Carmarthenshire League Premier Division – Champions: 2014–15
- Carmarthenshire League Division 1 – Champions: 1969–70, 1998–99
- Carmarthenshire League Division 2 – Champions: 1962–63
- Carmarthenshire League Division 3 – Champions: 1992–93, 2016–17 (reserves)
- Carmarthenshire League Division 4 – Champions: 1973–74
- Carmarthenshire League Reserve Division 1 – Champions: 2018–19
- T.G. Davies Cup – Winners: 2008, 2013, 2016, 2022 (reserves)
- Carmarthenshire Senior Cup - Winners: 2004, 2010
- Carmarthenshire Senior Cup - Runners-up: 2017
- Star Cup – Winners: 2013, 2014
- Morris Cup – Winners: 2016–17
- Challenge Cup – Winners: 1972
- Darch Cup – Winners: 1972
- Stephens Cup – Winners: 1969
