= Seaside A.F.C. =

Association football club in Wales

Seaside
- Full name: Seaside Association Football Club
- Ground: Crown Park
- Chairman: Huw Stone
- League: West Wales Premier League
- 2025–26: West Wales Premier League, 10th of 16

Seaside A.F.C. are a Welsh football club from Llanelli, Carmarthenshire in West Wales. They currently play in the West Wales Premier League.

== History ==
The club has been one of the most successful teams in the Carmarthenshire League, having been champions of the top division twelve times. They were promoted to the West Wales Premier League for the 2024–25 season, having finished the 2023–24 season of the Carmarthenshire League as champions.

== Honours ==
- Carmarthenshire League Premier Division (Tier 1 of Carmarthenshire League) - Champions (12): 2002–03; 2003–04; 2004–05; 2007–08; 2008–09; 2009–10; 2010–11; 2011–12; 2012–13; 2013–14; 2015–16; 2023–24
- Carmarthenshire League Division One (Tier 2) - Champions (1): 1994–95
- Carmarthenshire League Division Two (Tier 2) - Champions (1): 1956–57
- Carmarthenshire League Division Three (Tier 4) - Champions (1): 2015–16 (reserves)
- Carmarthenshire Senior Cup - Winners (8): 2001–02; 2004–05; 2011–12; 2012–13; 2014–15; 2016–17; 2022–23; 2023–24
- Carmarthenshire League T G Davies Cup - Winners (6): 1981–82; 1993–94; 2003–04; 2004–05; 2009–10; 2010–11
- Carmarthenshire League Challenge Cup - Winners (1): 1997–98
- Carmarthenshire League Darch Cup - Winners (1): 2002–03;
- Carmarthenshire League Morris Cup - Winners (4): 2011–12; 2012–13; 2013–14; 2015–16 (reserves)
- Carmarthenshire League J Stephens Cup - Winners (1): 2011–12
- West Wales Intermediate Challenge Cup – Winners (2): 2002–03; 2007–08
- West Wales Intermediate Challenge Cup – Runners-Up: 2013–14
