= Parc y Scarlets =

Rugby union stadium in Llanelli, Wales

- Scarlets Park
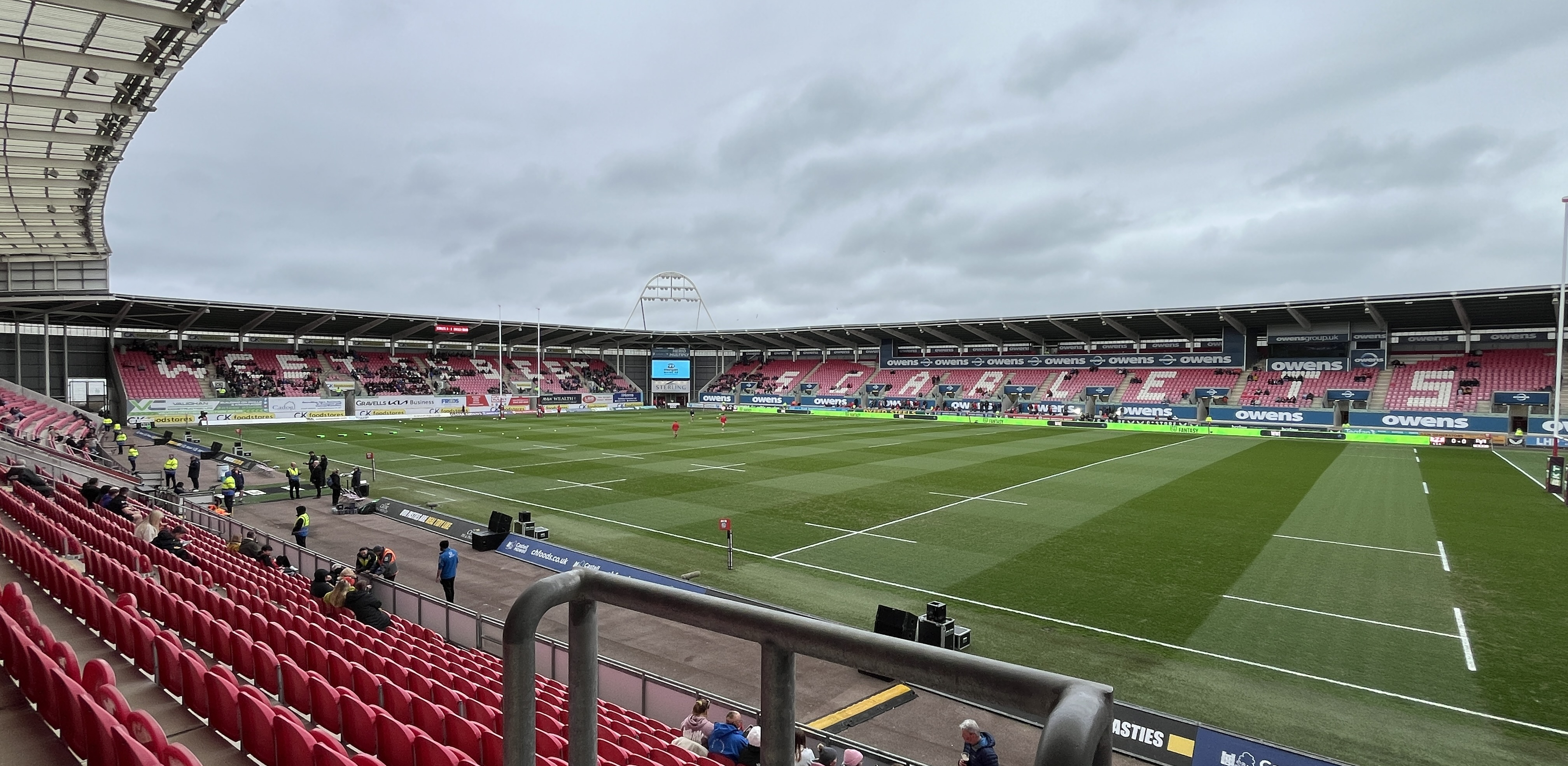

- Location within Carmarthenshire
- Former names: Pemberton Stadium
- Location: Pemberton, Llanelli, Wales
- Coordinates: 51°40′45″N 4°07′45″W
- Owner: Carmarthenshire County Council
- Operator: Llanelli RFC / Carmarthenshire County Council
- Capacity: 14,547
- Surface: Grass
- Record attendance: 15,373 (Scarlets v. La Rochelle, Champions Cup, 30 March 2018)
- Public transit: Pemberton Lights bus stop Llanelli

Construction
- Opened: 15 November 2008
- Cost: £23 million
- Architect: Miller Partnership

Tenants
- Scarlets; Llanelli RFC

Website
- parcyscarlets.com

Parc y Scarlets (Welsh pronunciation: [ˈpark ə ˈskarlɛts], meaning: Scarlets Park) is a rugby union stadium in Llanelli, Carmarthenshire, that opened in November 2008 as the new home of the Scarlets and Llanelli RFC.

The ground replaced Stradey Park, the home of Llanelli's rugby teams for almost 130 years. The stadium complex includes facilities for matchday supporters and for non-matchday revenue generation, as well as a training barn and a training pitch with athletics track. The stadium also occasionally hosts some matches of the Wales national under-21, women's and senior football teams, as well as Llanelli Town A.F.C.'s matches in European competitions. Swansea City A.F.C. Reserve Team played all of their home fixtures at the stadium in the 2011/2012 season. In 2020 the venue was used for Wales home games during the Autumn Nations Cup due to the Millennium Stadium being used as a backup Covid venue to Dragon's Heart hospital during the COVID-19 pandemic .

== History ==
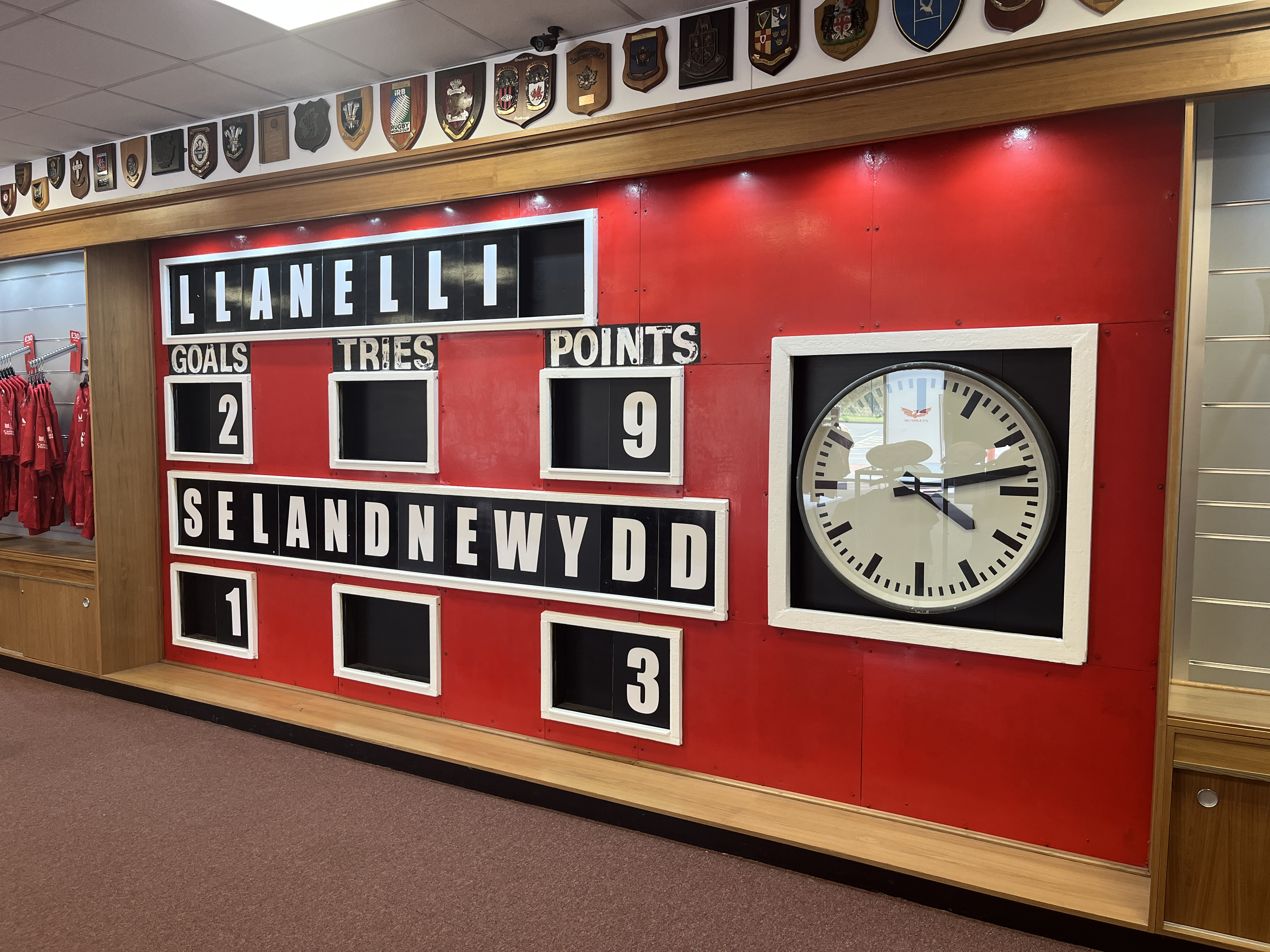
A replica of the scoreboard from Llanelli RFC's 9–3 win over New Zealand in 1972 on display in the Parc y Scarlets store.

The construction of a new stadium in Llanelli to replace Stradey Park was first suggested in June 2003, with the advent of regional rugby in Wales. Llanelli RFC chief executive Stuart Gallacher said Stradey Park was "not up to scratch" and that options were being considered, including the redevelopment of the existing ground and the construction of a new stadium elsewhere in the town. In March 2004, they announced plans to build a new, 15,000-capacity stadium at a cost of £20 million, funded in part by the sale of the Stradey Park site. The location for the new stadium was selected in July 2004, near the Trostre tin plate works in Pemberton, on the eastern outskirts of Llanelli, and plans for the new stadium were released a year later. The entire complex would cost £45 million and feature a retail park, athletics facility and an indoor training barn, subject to approval of the plans, after which construction would begin in spring 2006 and be completed by August 2007.

Having previously been known by the provisional title of "Pemberton Stadium", the stadium's official name – Parc y Scarlets – was announced on 20 May 2008.

== Design ==
The stadium was designed by specialist sports stadium architects The Miller Partnership, whose designs include Murrayfield Stadium in Edinburgh. The stands have a slight curvature to allow for better views. The stadium's main stand, on the south side of the ground, contain the club's shop and museum, the ticket office, a large sports bar (called "The Heart and Soul"), the players' gym and changing rooms on the ground floor, while the upper floors is provided with eating and drinking areas. Construction was carried out by Port Talbot-based Andrew Scott.

The approach to the main stand is known as the "Ray Gravell Legends Walkway" paved with bricks naming each Llanelli RFC and Scarlets player to have played for Wales. A statue of Ray Gravell is erected outside the stadium, while other Llanelli legends are honoured in the naming of other of the stadium's facilities, with the museum known as the "Ken Jones Museum", while the various executive lounges are named after Carwyn James, Phil Bennett and the Quinnell family.

== Opening ==
Before Parc y Scarlets could be opened to its full capacity, regulations required that it host three events at a limited capacity. The first rugby match was played there on 15 November 2008, when Llanelli RFC beat Cardiff RFC 32–3 in the Principality Premiership in front of a crowd of 4,800; Rhys Priestland scored the first points at the stadium, while Jonathan Davies scored the first try. The Scarlets' first match at the stadium on 28 November 2008 against Munster in the Celtic League with capacity limited to 9,000. The Scarlets' first Heineken Cup match in the new stadium was on 12 December 2008 against Ulster, with a capacity limit of 11,000. The official opening ceremony was held on 31 January 2009 when the Scarlets hosted the Barbarians, defeating them 40–24.

== Football ==
As well as being the new home of the Scarlets, Parc y Scarlets has also hosted three Wales international football friendlies: against Estonia in 2009, Luxembourg in 2010, and Bosnia and Herzegovina in 2012. It has also acted as home stadium for Llanelli Town A.F.C. when the facilities at their Stebonheath Park ground have not been sufficient, such as in European competitions. For example, the second leg of their 2009–10 UEFA Europa League qualifier against Motherwell and the first leg of their 2011–12 Europa League qualifier against Dinamo Tbilisi were both played at Parc y Scarlets as Stebonheath Park failed to meet UEFA criteria.

== Gallery ==
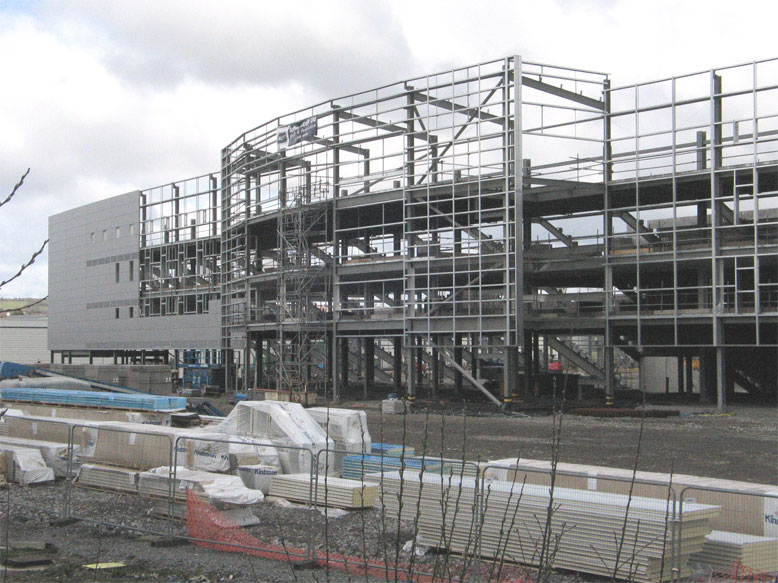
Work 7 April 2008

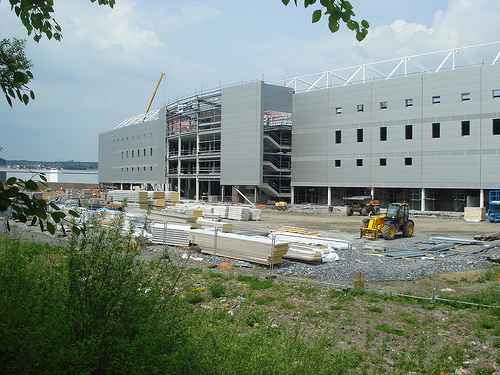
Work 12 May 2008

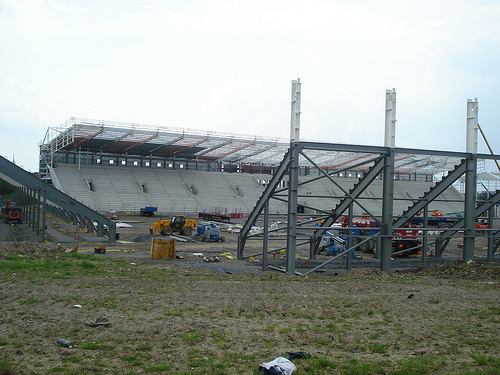
Work 12 May 2008

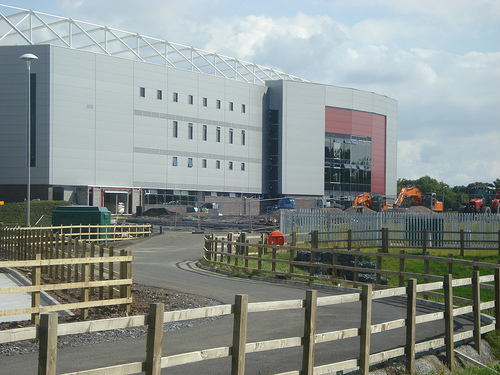
Work 13 September 2008

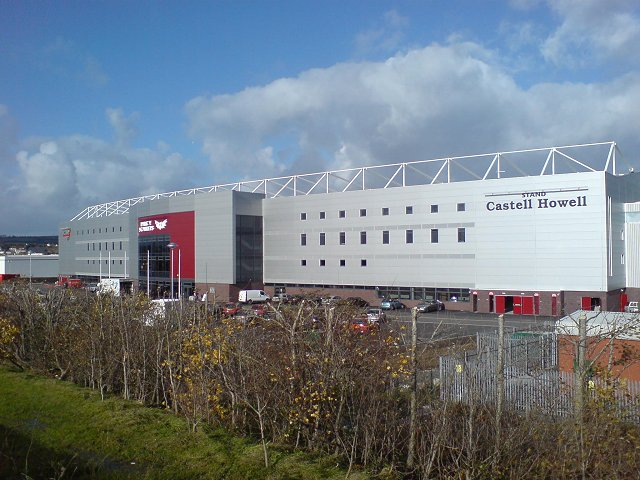
Outside the stadium

== See also ==
- List of stadia in Wales by capacity
