= Richard Janion Nevill =

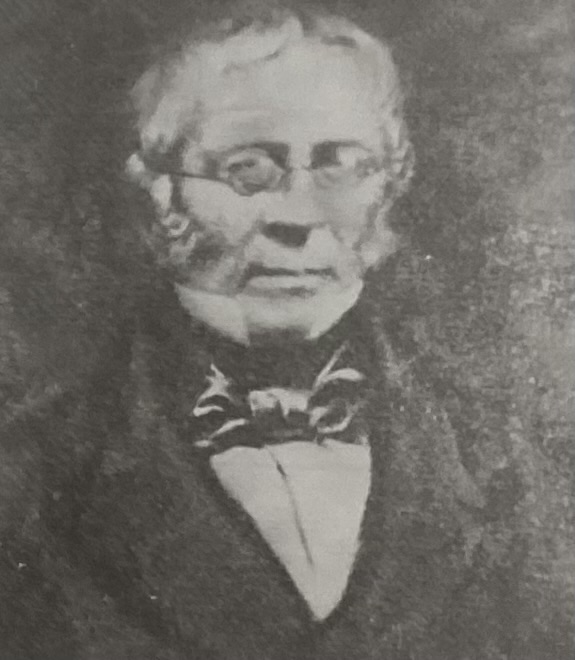
- Born: 22 November 1785; Birmingham
- Died: 14 January 1856 (aged 70); Llangennech Park

Richard Janion Nevill (22 November 1785-14 January 1856) was an English industrialist in Llanelli and its surrounding areas, including Llangennech.

== Biography ==
Nevill was born at Summer Hill, Birmingham, the first child of the Birmingham industrialist Charles Nevill. Charles moved to Llanelli to develop its coalfields. He partnered with other businessmen to form Daniell, Savill, Guest, and Nevill, coppersmelters. Richard took over his father's business upon his death in 1813.

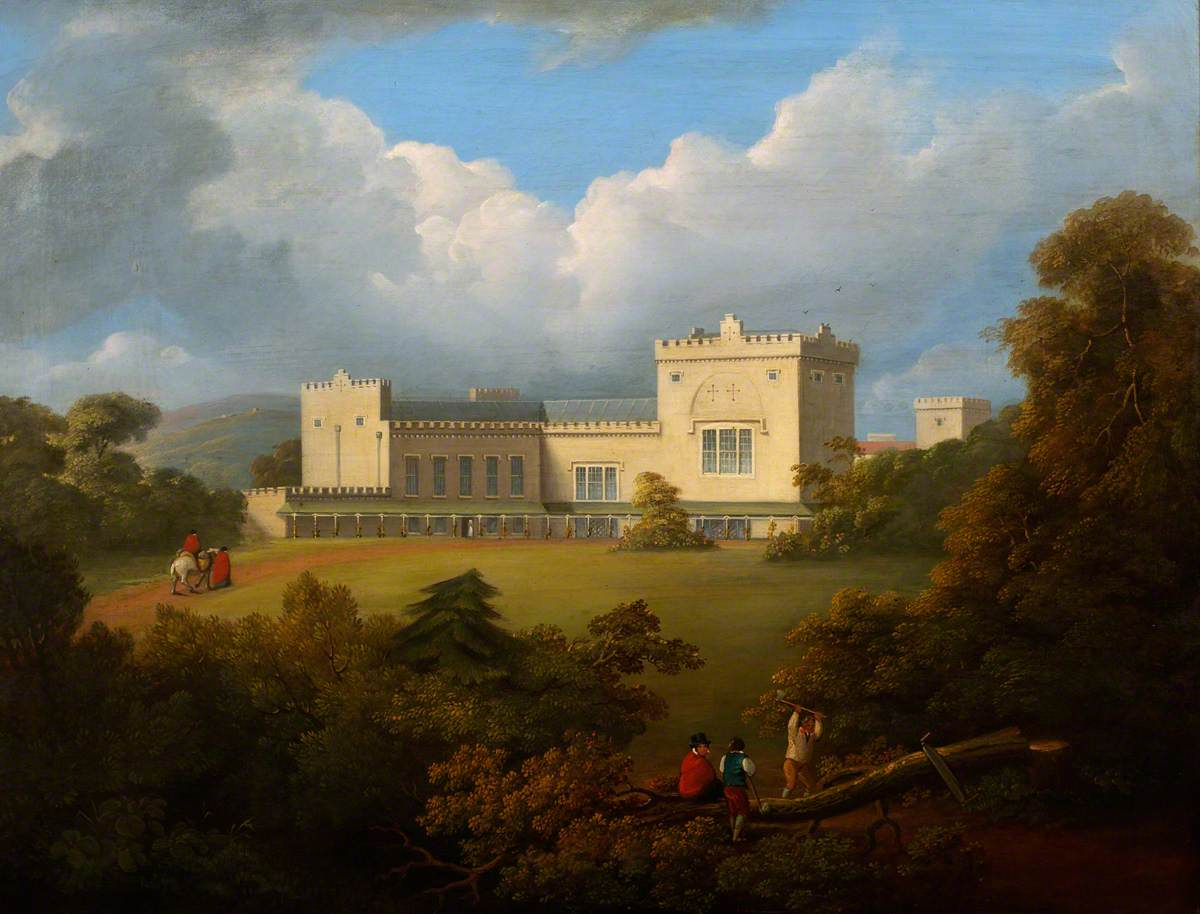
Llangennech Park, where Nevill and his family resided.

Nevill lived at Llangennech Park, which he leased from Edward Rose Tunno. During his residence there, Nevill became a magistrate and High Sheriff of Carmarthenshire. He was supportive of the Conservative Party.

Nevill contributed greatly to the local community, providing aid to build the British School at Llangennech in addition to a school for his workmen's children. He also provided aid during grain shortages.

He employed child labour in his collieries until at least 1842.

He had at least five children, including Charles William Nevill, Richard Nevill, and William Henry Nevill. Charles, the eldest, became an MP.

On 14 January 1856, Nevill died of a stroke in his mansion at Llangennech Park. Reportedly, 3000 people attended his funeral procession, and he was buried in the Llangennech parish churchyard.

== Arms ==
Coat of arms of Neville of Llangennech, Carmarthenshire
Crest A pied bull armed and gorged with a collar and line reflexed over the back or, and supporting with the dexter foot an escutcheon of the last, charged with an anchor erect sable. Escutcheon Gules on a saltire indented or, a crescent between four roses of the field barbed and seeded proper. Motto Ne vile velis (Nothing distasteful or vulgar)
