= Ysgol Llangennech =

Coordinates: 51.7022°N 4.0783°W

Ysgol Gymraeg Llangennech

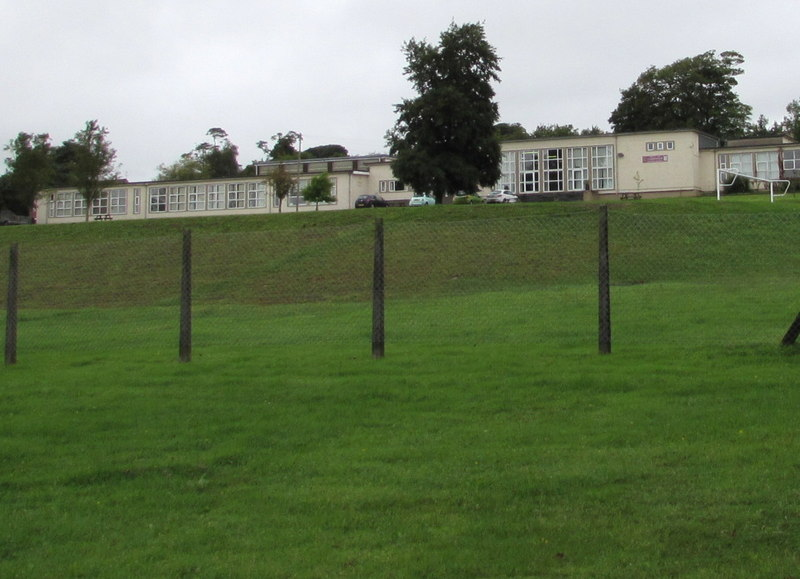
- The Years 3-6 building, viewed from below the playing field

Location
- Ysgol Gymraeg Llangennech; Carmarthenshire, SA14 8YB; Wales

Information
- Department for Education URN: 402412 Tables
- Headmaster: Gary Anderson
- Gender: Mixed
- Enrollment: 420 (2022)
- Website: Official website
- Last updated: 7 January 2024

Ysgol Llangennech (officially Ysgol Gymraeg Llangennech, English: Llangennech School) is a Welsh primary school located in Llangennech, Carmarthenshire. It was previously two schools, Ysgol Babanod Llangennech and Ysgol Iau Llangennech (in English, Llangennech Infant and Junior school respectively). These amalgamated in 2017 when the school became Welsh-only. The school came under the spotlight when it stopped offering bilingual education in 2017.

It has a successful choir which has competed in national competitions.

== History ==
=== Change from bilingual to Welsh-only ===
In January 2017 Carmarthenshire County Council voted 38-20 for the school to become Welsh-only rather than bilingual from September 2017. This move proved controversial and garnered widespread press coverage. Outlets reporting on the decision included The Guardian and S4C's Y Byd ar Bedwar. It was also brought up on the BBC's Question Time.

Opponents of the move included Neil Hamilton.

A Labour council member was criticised for likening the move to a form of apartheid. Another Labour party member was accused of coordinating with Hamilton and sharing posts from the far-right English Defence League. The latter was suspended from the party.

=== Extracurricular activities ===
The school has a successful choir who have competed in Songs of Praise's School Choir of the Year and the Urdd Eisteddfod, the former of which they won in 2015.
