= Carmarthenshire Senior Cup =

Welsh football tournament

- Founded: 1932
- Region: Wales
- Current champions: Trostre
- Most championships: Bwlch Rangers (11 titles)
- 2025–26

The Carmarthenshire Senior Cup (currently the Rooks Trophies Senior Cup for sponsorship reasons) is a football knockout tournament involving teams from in Carmarthenshire, West Wales who play in leagues administered and associated with the Carmarthenshire Association Football League.

== Past winners ==
Since the league began the following clubs have been senior cup winners.

=== 1920s ===
- 1925–26:
- 1926–27: Llanelly Steel
- 1927–28: Dafen Welfare
- 1928–29:
- 1929–30:

=== 1930s ===
- 1930–31:
- 1931–32:
- 1932–33: Bwlch Rangers
- 1933–34: Bwlch Rangers
- 1934–35: Halfway United
- 1935–36: Halfway United
- 1936–37: Bwlch Rangers
- 1937–38: Gorsddu Rangers
- 1938–39: Cathan Stars
- 1939–40: No competition

=== 1940s ===
- 1940–41: No competition
- 1941–42: No competition
- 1942–43: No competition
- 1943–44: No competition
- 1944–45: No competition
- 1945–46: No competition
- 1946–47: Dafen Welfare
- 1947–48: Hatchers Corries
- 1948–49: Bwlch Rangers
- 1949–50: Bwlch Rangers

=== 1950s ===
- 1950–51: Bwlch Rangers
- 1951–52: Ammanford United
- 1952–53: Dafen Welfare
- 1953–54: Bwlch Rangers
- 1954–55: Babcock & Wilcox
- 1955–56: Bwlch Rangers
- 1956–57: Mercury Athletic
- 1957–58: Llanelli Steel
- 1958–59: Bwlch Rangers
- 1959–60: Ammanford Athletic

=== 1960s ===
- 1960–61: Llanelli A
- 1961–62: Llanelli Steel
- 1962–63: Ammanford United
- 1963–64: Pengelli United
- 1964–65: Llanelli A
- 1965–66: Llanelli Steel
- 1966–67: Pengelli United
- 1967–68: Llanelli Steel
- 1968–69: Gorseinon Athletic
- 1969–70: Llanelli Steel

=== 1970s ===
- 1970–71: Llanelli Steel
- 1971–72: Llanelli A
- 1972–73: Gorseinon Athletic
- 1973–74: Pengelli United
- 1974–75: Dafen Welfare
- 1975–76: Gorseinon Athletic
- 1976–77: Dafen Welfare
- 1977–78: Garden Suburbs
- 1978–79: Bowdens
- 1979–80: Garden Suburbs

=== 1980s ===
- 1980–81: Llanelli Steel
- 1981–82: Dafen Welfare
- 1982–83: Garden Suburbs
- 1983–84: Gorseinon Athletic
- 1984–85: Gorseinon Athletic
- 1985–86: Gorseinon Athletic
- 1986–87: Gorseinon Athletic
- 1987–88: Llanelli A
- 1988–89: Dafen Welfare
- 1989–90: Garden Village

=== 1990s ===
- 1990–91: Pre Star Sports
- 1991–92: Llanelli Steel
- 1992–93: Drefach
- 1993–94: Llanelli Steel
- 1994–95: Garden Village
- 1995–96: Garden Village
- 1996–97: Garden Village
- 1997–98: Camford Sports
- 1998–99: Penllergaer
- 1999–2000: Bwlch Rangers

=== 2000s ===
- 2000–01: Trostre Sports
- 2001–02: Seaside
- 2002–03: Llanelli Steel
- 2003–04: Evans & Williams
- 2004–05: Seaside
- 2005–06: Trostre Sports
- 2006–07: Trostre Sports
- 2007–08: Bwlch Rangers
- 2008–09: Pengelli United
- 2009–10: Evans & Williams

=== 2010s ===
- 2010–11: Loughor
- 2011–12: Seaside
- 2012–13: Seaside
- 2013–14: Pengelli United
- 2014–15: Seaside
- 2015–16: Trostre Sports
- 2016–17: Seaside
- 2017–18: Bwlch Rangers
- 2018–19: Ammanford reserves
- 2019–20: Competition cancelled due to the COVID-19 pandemic

=== 2020s ===
- 2020–21: Competition cancelled due to the COVID-19 pandemic
- 2021–22: Trostre
- 2022–23: Seaside
- 2023–24: Seaside
- 2024–25: Caerbryn
- 2025–26: Trostre

== Number of competition wins since 1930s ==
- Bwlch Rangers – 11
- Llanelli Steel – 10 (+1 in the 1920s)
- Gorseinon Athletic – 8
- Seaside – 8
- Dafen Welfare – 6 (+1 in the 1920s)
- Trostre Sports – 6
- Pengelli United – 5
- Garden Village – 4
- Llanelli A – 4
- Garden Suburbs – 3
- Ammanford United – 2
- Evans & Williams – 2
- Halfway United – 2
- Pre Star Sports/ Camford Sports – 2
- Ammanford reserves – 1
- Ammanford Athletic – 1
- Babcock & Wilcox – 1
- Bowdens – 1
- Cathan Stars – 1
- Drefach – 1
- Gorsddu Rangers – 1
- Hatchers Corries – 1
- Loughor Rovers – 1
- Mercury Athletic – 1
- Penllergaer – 1
- Caerbryn - 1

== See also ==
- Pembrokeshire Senior Cup - a similar competition in neighbouring Pembrokeshire.
