= Harry Jones (cricketer, born 1922) =

Welsh cricketer

Personal information
- Full name: Harry Ogwyn Jones
- Born: 6 October 1922; Llangennech, Carmarthenshire, Wales
- Died: 20 March 1995 (aged 72); Llangennech, Carmarthenshire, Wales
- Batting: Right-handed
- Bowling: Right-arm medium

Domestic team information
- Years: Team
- 1946: Glamorgan

Career statistics
Competition	FC
Matches	2
Runs scored	10
Batting average	–
100s/50s	–/–
Top score	7*
Balls bowled	60
Wickets	–
Bowling average	–
5 wickets in innings	–
10 wickets in match	–
Best bowling	–
Catches/stumpings	–/–
- Source: Cricinfo, 1 July 2010

Harry Ogwyn Jones (6 October 1922 – 20 March 1995) was a Welsh cricketer. Jones was a right-handed batsman who bowled right-arm medium pace. He was born at Llangennech, Carmarthenshire.

Jones played two first-class matches for Glamorgan against Essex and Worcestershire in the 1946 County Championship.
