= Pwll =

Village in Carmarthenshire, Wales

Coordinates: 51.687589°N 4.209093°W

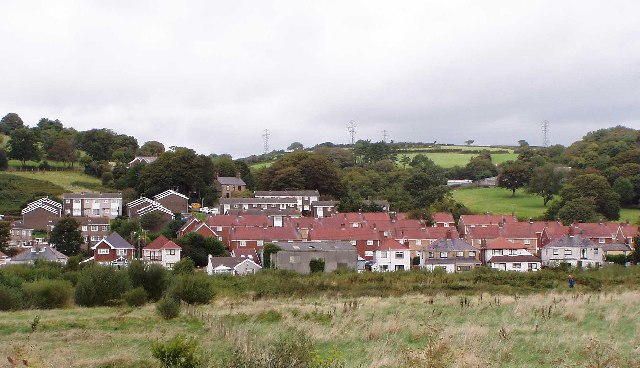
- A view of Pwll

- Location within Carmarthenshire
- OS grid reference: SN473010
- Community: Llanelli Rural
- Principal area: Carmarthenshire
- Preserved county: Dyfed
- Country: Wales
- Sovereign state: United Kingdom
- Post town: LLANELLI
- Postcode district: SA15
- Dialling code: 01554
- Police: Dyfed-Powys
- Fire: Mid and West Wales
- Ambulance: Welsh
- UK Parliament: Llanelli
- Senedd Cymru – Welsh Parliament: Llanelli

Blue plaque remembering Amelia Earhart's flight

Pwll is a small coastal village, located between Llanelli and Burry Port, Carmarthenshire, Wales. Situated on a narrow ledge above the tidal Burry Estuary, the village offers panoramic views across the water to the Gower Peninsula and is traversed by the Millennium Coastal Path, a thirteen-mile traffic-free greenway connecting Bynea to Pembrey. Pwll gained historical significance on 17 June 1928 when pioneering aviator Amelia Earhart landed nearby after completing the first transatlantic flight by a woman, an achievement now commemorated by a blue plaque along the coastal path.

== Description ==
The village is concentrated along the north of the A484. The land rises away from the coast providing a view of the Gower Peninsula (Welsh: Penrhyn Gŵyr). Pwll is part of the Llanelli Rural community and occupies a narrow ledge above the tidal Burry Estuary, midway between Llanelli and Burry Port. The traffic-free Millennium Coastal Path threads the seaward side of the village, giving cyclists and walkers a thirteen-mile greenway from Bynea to Pembrey; the official route guide names Pwll Pavilion Café as a refreshment stop and highlights the broad views across the estuary to the Gower peninsula.

Pwll has a local shop, a few pubs, a steakhouse restaurant The Bryngwyn, a primary school and local football teams senior and junior and previously cricket until the team folded. The area is also where the Millennium Coastal Path runs through allowing cyclists to get between Burry Port and Llanelli without the need to cycle on the road. Just east of Pwll playing fields the path passes a blue plaque commemorating the landing of the Fokker F VIIb piloted by Wilmer Stultz on 18 June 1928. The flight from Trepassey Bay, Newfoundland, made Amelia Earhart the first woman to cross the Atlantic by air and ended after twenty hours and forty minutes on the sands off Pwll, a location now marked in both Welsh and English as the spot where she ‘landed here in the estuary near the village of Pwll’.

== Aviation history ==
On 17 June 1928 pioneering aviator Amelia Earhart landed near the village in a Fokker F.VIIb/3m after flying exactly 20 hours and 40 minutes non-stop from Trepassey Harbor, Newfoundland. She became the first woman to fly non-stop across the Atlantic. A commemorative blue plaque now marks the site. As most of the flight was on instruments and because Earhart had no training for this type of flying, she did not pilot the aircraft. When interviewed after landing, she said, "Stultz did all the flying—had to. I was just baggage, like a sack of potatoes." She added, "... maybe someday I'll try it alone." In 1932 she completed her solo transatlantic flight.
