= Afon Morlais =

River in south Wales

Coordinates: 51.696°N 4.066°W

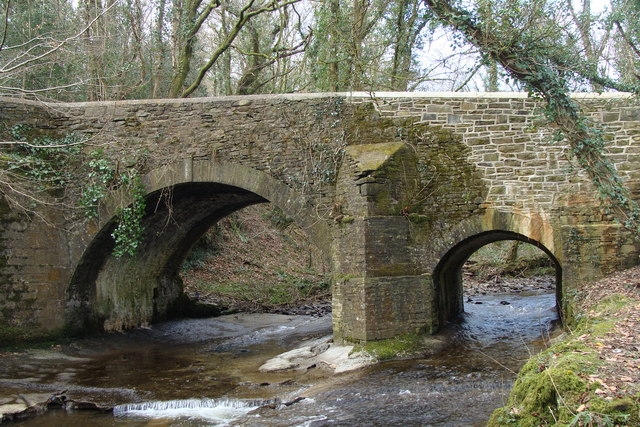
- Bridge over the river

Location
- Country: Wales
- County: Carmarthenshire

Physical characteristics
- Length: 8 km (5.0 mi)

The Afon Morlais is a small river in south Wales, a tributary of the River Loughor.

It rises in the village of Cross Hands and then flows southwards through Tumble before turning south east through a rural wooded valley before passing through Llangennech and making its confluence with the River Loughor in its tidal reach.

A minor road from Cil Ddewi to Blaenhiraeth crosses the river via a Grade II listed bridge.
