= Dafen, Carmarthenshire =

Village in Carmarthenshire, Wales

Coordinates: 51°41′34.00″N 4°08′08.00″W

Dafen
- Suburban village
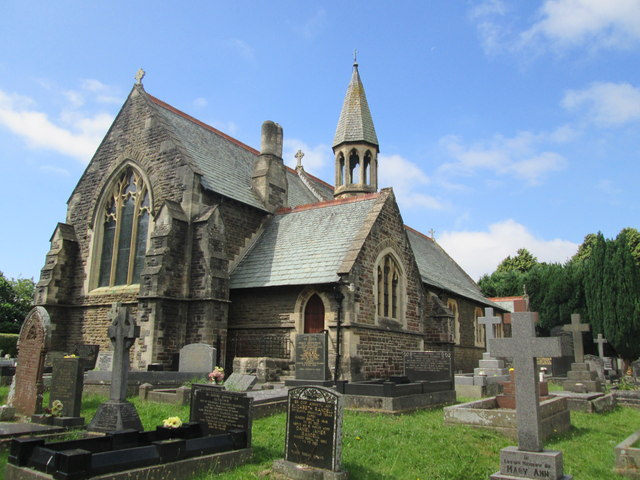
- St Michael and All Angels Church

- Location within Carmarthenshire
- Community: Llanelli Rural
- Principal area: Carmarthenshire
- Preserved county: Dyfed
- Country: Wales
- Sovereign state: United Kingdom
- Post town: LLANELLI
- Postcode district: SA14
- Police: Dyfed-Powys
- Fire: Mid and West Wales
- Ambulance: Welsh
- UK Parliament: Llanelli

Dafen is a village situated east of Llanelli in Carmarthenshire, Wales, part of the Llanelli Rural community. Dafen borders the villages of Felinfoel (Bryngwyn-Mawr), Bryn, Penceilogi, and Pemberton.

Dafen is also an electoral ward, electing councillors to Llanelli Rural Council and Carmarthenshire County Council. At the 2001 census the Dafen ward had a population of 3,433, increasing to 3,597 at the 2011 Census.

The village has both residential and industrial areas, and Llanelli's Prince Philip Hospital is located here.

Wales Air Ambulance is based at Dafen in a purpose-built headquarters completed in 2016.
