= Porth Tywyn Suburbs A.F.C. =

Association football club in Wales

Porth Tywyn Suburbs
- Full name: Porth Tywyn Suburbs Association Football Club
- Founded: 1921-2024
- Ground: Crown Park
- Chairman: Andrew Hall
- Manager: Anthony Evans
- Coach: Idris Mrbati
- 2023–24: Carmarthenshire League Division Two, 10th of 13

Clwb Pêl Droed Suburbs were a Welsh football club based in Llanelli, Carmarthenshire. The club has played under various names throughout its history. They previously played in the Welsh Football League, reaching its top flight, Division One (Tier 2 of the Welsh Football Pyramid). They last competed in the Carmarthenshire League.

== History ==
The club was formed in 1921 by local workmen in the Burry Port area and played its early years in the Llanelly and District League. The club has used various grounds in Burry Port, including Wood Brook - Park Tywyn, Glan y Mor Comprehensive School, and Memorial Park. The club is now known as Crown Park Suburbs and relocated in recent years to Crown Park in the Seaside area of Llanelli.

The club has also been known as Garden Suburbs F.C. and was briefly known as Garden Suburbs Rangers during the 1990s. The club competed in the Welsh Football League between the 1993–94 and 2003–04 seasons.

The club's centenary occurred during the 2020–21 season, but celebrations were delayed due to the coronavirus pandemic. In the 2021–22 season, a revised centenary book was published, which included extracts from the previous 75-year anniversary book by Dai Bowen. Three centenary matches were also played, including one against a select Carmarthenshire League side. In February 2025 the club announced a rename to Clwb Pêl Droed Suburbs.

== Honours ==
- Welsh Football League Division Two - Runners-Up: 1997–98
- Welsh Football League Division Three - Runners-Up: 1994–95
- Carmarthenshire League Premier Division - Champions: (3) 1979–80; 1983–84; 1989–90
- Carmarthenshire League First Division - Champions: 1975–76
- Carmarthenshire Senior Cup - Winners (3): 1977–78; 1979–80; 1982–83
- Carmarthenshire Challenge Cup - Winners: 1975–76
- Darch Cup - Winners (4): 1974–75; 1978–79; 1983–84; 1989–90
- West Wales Cup - Winners: 1984–85

== Welsh Football League history ==
| Season | Pyramid Tier | League | Final position |
|---|---|---|---|
| 1993–94 | 4 | Welsh Football League Division Three | 4th |
| 1994–95 | 4 | Welsh Football League Division Three | 2nd - Runners-Up (promoted) |
| 1995–96 | 3 | Welsh Football League Division Two | 7th |
| 1996–97 | 3 | Welsh Football League Division Two | 5th |
| 1997–98 | 3 | Welsh Football League Division Two | 2nd - Runners-Up (promoted) |
| 1998–99 | 2 | Welsh Football League Division One | 16th |
| 1999–2000 | 2 | Welsh Football League Division One | 12th |
| 2000–01 | 2 | Welsh Football League Division One | 16th (relegated) |
| 2001–02 | 3 | Welsh Football League Division Two | 4th |
| 2002–03 | 3 | Welsh Football League Division Two | 16th (relegated) |
| 2003–04 | 4 | Welsh Football League Division Three | Resigned mid-season |

== Welsh Cup ==
In the 2003–04 competition, the club reached the fourth round. The tie was awarded to Afan Lido as a walkover after Porth Tywyn Suburbs resigned from the league.
