= Carmarthenshire League =

Welsh football league

- Country: Wales
- Number of clubs: 36
- Level on pyramid: 5–7
- Promotion to: West Wales Premier League
- Domestic cup: Carmarthenshire Senior Cup
- Current champions: Pontlliw (2025–26)
- Most championships: Trostre Sports (14 titles)

The Carmarthenshire League (currently the LTC Mobility Carmarthenshire Association Football League) is a football league in Carmarthenshire, West Wales, sitting at the fifth, sixth and seventh levels of the Welsh football league system. The Carmarthenshire League is run by the West Wales Football Association.

Teams promoted from the Premier Division may enter the West Wales Premier League if standards and facilities fall into line with the regulations of the Welsh Football League.

== History ==
The league has its origins in the Llanelly & District League. In 1931 the league renamed to the Llanelly & Carmarthenshire League, and a year later it adopted its current name.

== Former league clubs who have played in higher level leagues ==
=== Welsh Football League ===
The following teams from the league went on to play in the Welsh Football League:

- Garden Village
- Porth Tywyn Suburbs

=== West Wales Premier League ===
- CK Swiss Valley
- Dafen Welfare
- Evans & Williams
- Llangennech
- Pontarddulais Town
- Seaside

== Member clubs for 2026–27 season ==
The following clubs were members of the league.

=== Premier Division ===
- Bwlch Rangers
- Burry Port
- Caerbryn & Saron
- Camford Sports
- Drefach
- Dafen Welfare
- Evans & Williams (reserves)
- Kidwelly Town
- Killay
- Loughor Rovers
- Trostre
- Tumble United

=== Division One ===
- Abergwili
- Ammanford (reserves)
- CK Swiss Valley ('A')
- Garden Village (reserves)
- Gorseinon Athletic
- Johnstown
- Llandovery Town
- Llangennech (reserves)
- Pengelli United
- Pwll Athletic
- Pontarddulais Town (reserves)
- Trallwm

=== Division Two ===
- Bancffosfelen
- Felinfoel
- Llandeilo Town
- Pembrey
- Penygroes
- Penygroes United
- Ponthenri
- Pontlliw (reserves)
- Seaside (reserves)
- South Gower reserves
- Trimsaran
- West End United

== League Champions ==
Since the league began the following clubs have been the senior champions of the league:

=== 1920s ===
- 1925–26: Dafen Welfare
- 1926–27:
- 1927–28:
- 1928–29:
- 1929–30:

=== 1930s ===
- 1930–31:
- 1931–32:
- 1932–33: Morfa United
- 1933–34: Halfway United
- 1934–35: Gorsddu Rangers
- 1935–36: Dafen Welfare
- 1936–37: Gorsddu Rangers
- 1937–38: Bwlch Rangers
- 1938–39: Cathan Stars
- 1939–40: No competition

=== 1940s ===
- 1940–41: No competition
- 1941–42: No competition
- 1942–43: Loughor Rovers
- 1943–44: No competition
- 1944–45: No competition
- 1945–46: Pontyates
- 1946–47: Dafen Welfare
- 1947–48: Dafen Welfare
- 1948–49: Ponthenry
- 1949–50: Bwlch Rangers

=== 1950s ===
- 1950–51: Dafen Welfare
- 1951–52: Dafen Welfare
- 1952–53: Bwlch Rangers
- 1953–54: Bwlch Rangers
- 1954–55: Babcock & Wilcox
- 1955–56: Trostre Sports
- 1956–57: Bwlch Rangers
- 1957–58: Bwlch Rangers / Llanelli Steel (shared)
- 1958–59: Llanelli Steel
- 1959–60: Llanelli A

=== 1960s ===
- 1960–61: Llanelli A
- 1961–62: Llanelli A
- 1962–63: Llanelli Steel
- 1963–64: Ammanford United
- 1964–65: Llanelli Steel
- 1965–66: Llanelli Steel
- 1966–67: Pengelli United
- 1967–68: Llanelli Steel
- 1968–69: Llanelli Steel
- 1969–70: Llanelli Steel

=== 1970s ===
- 1970–71: Pengelli United
- 1971–72: Llanelli A
- 1972–73: Gorseinon Athletic
- 1973–74: Gorseinon Athletic
- 1974–75: Gorseinon Athletic
- 1975–76: Gorseinon Athletic
- 1976–77: Llanelli Steel
- 1977–78: Llanelli Steel
- 1978–79: Llanelli Steel
- 1979–80: Garden Suburbs

=== 1980s ===
- 1980–81: Ammanford Athletic
- 1981–82: Gorseinon Athletic
- 1982–83: Gorseinon Athletic
- 1983–84: Garden Suburbs
- 1984–85: Dafen Welfare
- 1985–86: Gorseinon Athletic
- 1986–87: Gorseinon Athletic
- 1987–88: Trostre Sports
- 1988–89: Trostre Sports
- 1989–90: Garden Suburbs

=== 1990s ===
- 1990–91: Gorseinon Athletic
- 1991–92: Trostre Sports
- 1992–93: Llanelli Steel
- 1993–94: Trallwm
- 1994–95: Trostre Sports
- 1995–96: Penyfan United
- 1996–97: Trostre Sports
- 1997–98: Trostre Sports
- 1998–99: Trostre Sports
- 1999–2000: Bwlch Rangers

=== 2000s ===
- 2000–01: Camford Sports
- 2001–02: Trostre Sports
- 2002–03: Seaside
- 2003–04: Seaside
- 2004–05: Seaside
- 2005–06: Trostre Sports
- 2006–07: Trostre Sports
- 2007–08: Seaside
- 2008–09: Seaside
- 2009–10: Seaside

=== 2010s ===
- 2010–11: Seaside
- 2011–12: Seaside
- 2012–13: Seaside
- 2013–14: Seaside
- 2014–15: Evans & Williams
- 2015–16: Seaside
- 2016–17: Trostre Sports
- 2017–18: Bwlch Rangers
- 2018–19: Trallwm
- 2019–20: Trostre Sports

=== 2020s ===
- 2020–21: Season void
- 2021–22: Trostre Sports
- 2022–23: Pontlliw
- 2023–24: Seaside (promoted to WWPL)
- 2024–25: Pontlliw
- 2025–26: Pontlliw (promoted to WWPL via play-offs)

=== Number of titles by winning clubs since 1930s ===
- Trostre Sports – 14 titles
- Llanelli Steel – 12 titles (including 1 shared)
- Seaside – 12 tiles
- Gorseinon Athletic – 9 titles
- Bwlch Rangers – 8 titles (including 1 shared)
- Dafen Welfare – 6 titles (plus 1 in the 1920s)
- Llanelli A – 4 titles
- Pontlliw – 3 titles
- Garden Suburbs – 3 titles
- Ammanford United – 2 titles
- Gorsddu Rangers – 2 titles
- Pengelli United – 2 titles
- Trallwm – 2 titles
- Ammanford Athletic – 1 title
- Babcock & Wilcox – 1 title
- Camford Sports – 1 title
- Cathan Stars – 1 title
- Evans & Williams – 1 title
- Halfway United – 1 title
- Loughor Rovers – 1 title
- Morfa United – 1 title
- Penyfan United – 1 title
- Ponthenry – 1 title
- Pontyates – 1 title

== Cup competitions ==
A number of annual competitions are competed for:

- Carmarthenshire Senior Cup
- T G Davies Cup
- Challenge Cup
- Darch Cup
- Morris Cup
- J Stephens Cup

== See also ==
- Football in Wales
- List of football clubs in Wales
