= Terry Davies (rugby union) =

British Lions & Wales international rugby union player (1933–2021)

Terry Davies MBE
- Born: Terence John Davies; 24 September 1933 Bynea, Wales
- Died: 5 August 2021 (aged 87)
- Height: 5 ft 11 in (180 cm)
- Weight: 13 st (182 lb; 83 kg) 7 in
- Notable relative: Len Davies (brother)
- Occupation: timber-merchant

Rugby union career
- Position: Full back
Amateur team(s)
Years	Team	Apps	(Points)
1951–1956	Swansea RFC		
1956	Llanelli RFC		
International career
Years	Team	Apps	(Points)
- Wales Youth
1953–1961	Wales	21	(50)
1959	British Lions	2	(5)

Terence John Davies MBE (24 September 1933 – 5 August 2021) was a Welsh international full back who played club rugby for Swansea and Llanelli. He won 21 caps for Wales and was selected to play in the British Lions on the 1959 tour of Australia and New Zealand. Davies was seen as the last of the great Welsh full backs, before the 'No direct kicking into touch' rule was introduced in the late sixties and changed the full back role.

== Early and club career ==
Born in Bynea in 1933, Davies was an international Welsh Youth with Bynea, before making his debut for Swansea, against Ebbw Vale in 1951. He gave an excellent performance and soon was a regular in the squad, facing the South Africans for Swansea on 15 December later that year. Given the kicking duties against the Springboks, it wasn't the best performance from Davies, who missed a drop goal, penalty and an easy conversion; the points lost would have changed the result to a Swansea victory.

Davies was a notoriously heavy and accurate tackler, and was a reliable rear-guard defence against break away wingers, but he suffered physically through it. In the 1953–54 season he dislocated his shoulder for the first time and in a pre-season tour of Romania with Swansea in 1954 he shattered his shoulder when a heavy tackle took him into a concrete surround. His rugby career looked over until his shoulder was wired back together in a successful operation. In 1956, Davies left Swansea and joined Llanelli, the club he would remain with for the rest of his career, even when offered an £8,500 to transfer to Leeds.

In 1960 the South Africans played Llanelli as part of their tour. Davies was more than aware that in an earlier game against Swansea, the Springbok Francois Roux, had taken out Malcolm Rogers in a late tackle as Rogers had kicked a clearance. The tackle had sent Rogers to hospital with a dislocated shoulder and Davies was expecting Roux to try the same on him. When the South Africans played Llanelli, Davies was placed into the situation he had predicted. He collected a high ball at full back position and saw Roux closing in on him. Instead of kicking the ball clear, Davies, expecting the high tackle, kept the ball and swung his shoulders into Roux, knocking him to the ground. Roux recovered quickly but missed the next game. Davies later described Roux as a "...silly little man".

== International career ==
Davies made his international debut for Wales against England on 17 January 1953 in a home game at the Cardiff Arms Park. Although Davies scored a penalty kick, it was the only score that Wales could muster, and they lost 8–3. Davies was selected for the remaining three games of the Championship, winning them all, with Davies scoring another penalty against Scotland. Injury kept Davies from international rugby until 1957, when he returned against England. The match against Ireland during the same campaign saw Davies's kicking win the match. In a game played in extremely muddy conditions, the Welsh pack took control and two penalty goals from Davies was enough to give Wales the victory.

The 1958 Five Nations Championship game between England and Wales at Twickenham has become synonymous with Terry Davies. In a match where the Welsh team played without the Prince of Wales's feathers due to a mistake by the manufacturers, Davies had an opportunity to take the lead for Wales with a penalty kick. The mark was fifty yards out, and against the wind but Davies's kick was true and would have won the game but the ball hit the crossbar and bounced back. That night a group of Welsh supporters climbed the posts and cut down a section of the offending crossbar and took it back to Wales. Davies, a timber merchant, offered to replace it.

In 1959, Davies was selected for the British Lions on their tour of Australia and New Zealand. Davies should have been chosen for more matches, but a leg injury and some questionable selection choices restricted his appearances. During the second Test against New Zealand, Davies received a leg injury in the first quarter of an hour, but remained on the pitch to kick a penalty and a conversion. Although the Lions lost the game, Davies played well in the Final Test which the Lions won.

During the 1960 season, Wales faced the touring South Africans and Davies was chosen to captain the Welsh team. At the beginning of the game Davies won the toss for Wales and chose to play into the strong wind. Wales kept the Springboks at bay in the first half trailing to a single penalty from Keith Oxlee, but failed to score in the second half even with the wind now behind them. Davies would captain Wales on two more occasions, but would play his last international game in 1961 against France.

=== International matches played ===
Wales

- Australia 1958
- England 1953, 1957, 1958, 1959, 1960, 1961
- France 1953, 1957, 1958, 1959, 1961
- Ireland 1953, 1957, 1959
- Scotland 1953, 1957, 1958, 1959, 1961
- South Africa 1960

British Lions

- New Zealand 1959, 1959

== Personal history ==
In 2013, Davies was awarded the MBE for services to the communities of Bynea and Llanelli.

Davies died on 5 August 2021, at the age of 87.

== Bibliography ==
- Billot, John (1974). Springboks in Wales. Ferndale, Glamorgan: Ron Jones Publications.
- Smith, David; Williams, Gareth (1980). Fields of Praise: The Official History of The Welsh Rugby Union. Cardiff: University of Wales Press. ISBN 0-7083-0766-3.
- Thomas, Wayne (1979). A Century of Welsh Rugby Players. Ansells Ltd.
- Davies, Terry; Thomas, Geraint (2016). Terry Davies, Wales's First Superstar Fullback. Y Lolfa
