= Cwmcarnhywel =

Village in Carmarthenshire, Wales

Coordinates: 51.6820°N 4.1200°W

- Location within Carmarthenshire
- Principal area: Carmarthenshire
- Shire county: Carmarthenshire
- Country: Wales
- Sovereign state: United Kingdom
- Post town: LLANELLI
- Postcode district: SA14
- Police: Dyfed-Powys
- Fire: Mid and West Wales
- Ambulance: Welsh
- UK Parliament: Llanelli
- Senedd Cymru – Welsh Parliament: Llanelli

Cwmcarnhywel is a village in between Llwynhendy, Pemberton, Penceilogi and Bryn in Llanelli. The village is home to a row of shops; The Avenue, Ysgol Gymraeg Brynsierfel (the area's Welsh school) and became a village after the council estate was built in the 1950s. Before that, Cwm-Carn-Hywel was the name given to a small hamlet near Pemberton. It also has its own police station which is named Llwynhendy police station as it is in the Llwynhendy electoral ward for Carmarthenshire County Council and Dyfed-Powys Police.
