= Bynea =

Village in Carmarthenshire, Wales

Coordinates: 51.674°N 4.103°W

- Location within Carmarthenshire
- Principal area: Carmarthenshire
- Shire county: Carmarthenshire
- Country: Wales
- Sovereign state: United Kingdom
- Post town: LLANELLI
- Postcode district: SA14
- Police: Dyfed-Powys
- Fire: Mid and West Wales
- Ambulance: Welsh
- UK Parliament: Llanelli
- Senedd Cymru – Welsh Parliament: Llanelli

Bynea (/ˈbɪnjə/ BIN-yə;; sometimes Welsh: Bynie) is a village close to the River Loughor (Welsh: Afon Llwchwr) in Carmarthenshire, Wales. It also forms an electoral ward for the purposes of elections to Carmarthenshire County Council, and is situated in Berwig Hamlet. It borders with the villages of Llwynhendy, Bryn, Pen-y-graig and Loughor.

It has no shops and is governed by the Bynea District Forum.

== History ==
Bynea was originally the grassing lands for the Romans, who built their fort in Loughor. The Yspitty area of Bynea was also a port for the ferry crossing of the River Loughor. It wasn't until the middle of the 19th century when the first Loughor Bridge was built that the Banc Y Spitty port was closed and the ferry from Loughor to Bynea out of use. Bynea was the name given to the areas east of the village centre and the lands used by the Romans. Where the old and central part of the village today, was originally called Cwm-Felin.This is still visible by the fact of the Cwmfelin Road running through Bynea to nearby Llwynhendy. It was called this after the mill that is still visible today from Heol Saron.

This was an agricultural area until the turn of the twentieth century, when it became heavily industrialised with coal mines and steelworks. Bynea runs into the village of Llwynhendy, and between the two there are four places of worship, and a number of pubs.

== Welsh language ==
The Welsh language is spoken by over half the village's population. Bynea is part of the Llanelli Rural community, where 56% of people speak Welsh.

== Additional information ==
Terry Davies, the rugby union player, is from this area and Kel Coslett the Rugby League legend was born there and still is of residence in the village.

The village is served by Bynea railway station with trains operating to Swansea to the south and Shrewsbury to the north.

In 1997 the Bynea District Forum was formed with the aim of protecting and promoting the community, its heritage and residents. The forum covers the village itself as well as the communities of Pen-y-graig, Bryn and parts of Llwynhendy it has fought off many unwanted developments and incursions by groups of travellers. In 2017 after 20 years of loyal service the original officers of the forum retired and a new set of officers was elected to carry the work forward.

== Sources ==
- Bynea and Llwynhendy Local History Group, (2000) A History of Bynea and Llwynhendy.
