= Pemberton, Carmarthenshire =

Area of Llanelli, Wales

Coordinates: 51.683°N 4.130°W

Y Pemberton
- Location within Carmarthenshire
- Principal area: Carmarthenshire
- Shire county: Carmarthenshire
- Country: Wales
- Sovereign state: United Kingdom
- Post town: LLANELLI
- Postcode district: SA14
- Police: Dyfed-Powys
- Fire: Mid and West Wales
- Ambulance: Welsh
- UK Parliament: Llanelli
- Senedd Cymru – Welsh Parliament: Llanelli

Pemberton is an area situated east of Llanelli in Carmarthenshire, Wales. It is part of the Llanelli Rural (Welsh-Llanelli Wledig) community bordering Llanelli and the villages of Cwmcarnhywel, Dafen, Cefncaeau and the outskirts of Llanelli town.

== History ==
The name of the area derives from the Pemberton family, landowners and industrialists from the North of England who played a role in the development of Llanelli (especially the local coal industry) in the early 19th century. Tata Steel Europe today operates the Trostre Steelworks tinplate factory, originally developed by the Steel Company of Wales in 1947. The plant currently employs around 700 people and manufactures tinplated steel for packaging applications such a food and drinks cans, aerosols and paint tins.

A new 14,340 seater stadium, Parc y Scarlets, was constructed here as a replacement to Stradey Park. Parc y Scarlets is home to the Scarlets and Llanelli RFC rugby teams. The cost of the new stadium was £23m. A new retail park is beside the stadium, called Parc Pemberton Retail Park.

== Governance ==
Pemberton is a ward to Llanelli Rural Council, electing four community councillors.

For elections to Carmarthenshire County Council, Pemberton is covered by the Llwynhendy ward, which elects two county councillors.
