= Cynheidre railway station =

Heritage railway station in Cynheidre, Carmarthenshire

Cynheidre
- Trackbed of the former railway line in Cynheidre and near to the former station site. The track is part of the Llanelli and Mynydd Mawr Railway which is a heritage railway.

General information
- Location: Cynheidre, Carmarthenshire; Wales
- Coordinates: 51.743207°N 4.182903°W

Other information
- Status: Disused

History
- Original company: Llanelly and Mynydd Mawr Railway
- Pre-grouping: Great Western Railway
- Post-grouping: Great Western Railway

Key dates
- 1881: Opened to passengers
- 1929: Closed to passengers
- 1950: Cross Hands Goods Yard closed
- 01 February 1965: Station closes to goods traffic
- 1989: Cynheidre Colliery closes and the line closes to all freight traffic
- 13 August 2001: The Llanelli and Mynydd Mawr Railway build their heritage centre on the site of Cynheidre Colliery
- September 2017: The first public service is run by the heritage railway
Location

Cynheidre railway station is a preserved railway station on the Llanelli and Mynydd Mawr Railway, serving the small village of Cynheidre in Carmarthenshire, Wales.

It was opened as a goods station on the Llanelly and Mynydd Mawr Railway from Llanelli to Cross Hands and the freight only branch lines to both Llanelli Docks and Llanelly Queen Victoria Road.

== History ==
The Llanelly and Mynydd Mawr Railway was opened in 1881, connecting Llanelli Docks to the Burry Port and Gwendraeth Valley Railway. The line was also opened to serving local collieries within the Gwendraeth valley.

A station was opened, albeit untimetabled in Cynheidre in 1881, but closed in 1929 to passengers. Workmens trains continued to use the station until the 1960s. The station was also listed as "Cynheidre Goods Station" due to its proximity to the nearby Cynheidre Colliery.

== Operations ==
The station was originally operated by the Llanelly and Mynydd Mawr Railway before being operated by the Great Western Railway after the company had absorbed the Llanelly and Mynydd Mawr Railway.

== Closure ==
The station was closed to passengers in 1929, then to goods in 1965 following a sharp decline in coal mining within Wales and the local valleys. This was also due to the closure of Cross Hands Goods Yard, that the line became a dead end stub between Cynheidre and Llanelli by 1950.

The line between Llanelli and Cynheidre Colliery remained active for freight trains until the closure of the colliery in 1989 and the full closure of the line. Although rail tours also visited the site of the colliery and station along the route of the line.

== Preservation ==
Following the closure of the railway line in 1989, the Llanelli and District Railway Society ran an unsuccessful campaign to stop the full closure of the railway line which lasted for a decade.

The railway was sold in the mid-1990s by the British Rail property board to the local authorities as part of a scheme to transform the track bed into a cycle way. This saw the creation of the "Swiss Valley Cycle Route" between Llanelli and Cross Hands.

Soon afterwards, a new not-for-profit organisation under the name "Llanelli and Mynydd Mawr Railway Company Ltd" bought the site of both the former colliery and the sidings to it. They established a heritage centre with locomotives, sidings and works in August 2001.

In September 2017, the new Cynheidre station was constructed and that same year, the first ever public service operated by the society was completed on a short section of track to the Cynheidre station from the heritage centre.

Future ambitions are for the society to reopen the line between Cynheidre and near as possible to Llanelli along the route of the former line. As well as extending to as far as Tumble along the route of the old line.

== Present day ==
Today, the site of the station is now part of a shared heritage railway and public footpath. Nothing remains of the former station today, but its replacement on the heritage railway is a short distance north.

== Routes ==
Preceding station	Historical railways	Following station
Horeb; Line and station closed	Llanelly and Mynydd Mawr Railway; Great Western Railway	Cwmblawd; Line and station closed
