= Cwmblawd railway station =

Disused railway station in Pontyberem, Carmarthenshire

Cwmblawd

General information
- Location: Pontyberem, Carmarthenshire; Wales
- Coordinates: 51.77056°N 4.15425°W

Other information
- Status: Disused

History
- Original company: Llanelly and Mynydd Mawr Railway
- Pre-grouping: Great Western Railway
- Post-grouping: Great Western Railway

Key dates
- 1883: Opened to passengers
- 1929: Closed to passengers
- 1950: Cross Hands Goods Yard closed
- 02 February 1959: Station closes to goods traffic
Location

Cwmblawd railway station was an unadvertised passenger and goods station, that served the nearby village of Pontyberem in Carmarthenshire, Wales.

It was opened as a goods station on the Llanelly and Mynydd Mawr Railway from Llanelli to Cross Hands and the freight only branch lines to both Llanelli Docks and Llanelly Queen Victoria Road.

== History ==
The Llanelly and Mynydd Mawr Railway was opened in 1881, connecting Llanelli Docks to the Burry Port and Gwendraeth Valley Railway. The line was also opened to serving local collieries within the Gwendraeth valley.

A station was opened, albeit untimetabled in Cwmblawd, but closed in 1929 to passengers. Workmens trains continued to use the station until the 1950s.

The station was also listed as "Cwmblawd Goods Station" due to its proximity to the nearby Cwm Blawd Farm.

== Operations ==
The station was originally operated by the Llanelly and Mynydd Mawr Railway before being operated by the Great Western Railway after the company had absorbed the Llanelly and Mynydd Mawr Railway.

== Closure ==
The station was closed to passengers in 1929, then to goods in 1963 following a sharp decline in coal mining within Wales and the local valleys.

The line between Llanelli and Cynheidre Colliery remained active for freight trains until the closure of the colliery in 1989 and the full closure of the line.

== Present day ==
Today, the site of the station is now part of a public footpath. Nothing remains of the former station today.

== Routes ==
Preceding station	Historical railways	Following station
Cynheidre; Station open, line closed	Llanelly and Mynydd Mawr Railway; Great Western Railway	Tumble; Line and station closed
