= Ian Gallagher (disambiguation) =

Ian Gallagher is a character from the British programme and U.S. remake, Shameless.

Ian Gallagher or Gallacher may also refer to:

- Ian Gallagher (cricketer) (born 1950), Australian cricketer
- Ian Gallagher (footballer), retired English footballer
- Ian Stuart Gallacher, Welsh rugby player
