= Chris Matthews (disambiguation) =

Chris Matthews (born 1945) is an American talk-show host.

Chris Matthews or Christopher Matthews may also refer to:

- Chris Matthews (gridiron football) (born 1989), American football wide receiver
- Chris Matthews (cricketer) (born 1962), Australian cricketer
- Chris Matthews (New Zealand musician), New Zealand rock musician
- Chris Matthews, American businessman, former chairman of Hay Group
- Chris Matthews (Australian musician), Australian country musician
- Christopher Matthews (businessman) (1950–2004), British businessman
- Chris Matthews (rugby union)

== See also ==
- Christopher Matthew (born 1939), British writer and broadcaster
