= LMMR =

LMMR may refer to:

- Llanelli and Mynydd Mawr Railway, heritage railway
- Llanelly and Mynydd Mawr Railway, historical
- Long Marston Military Railway
