= Felinfoel RFC =

Welsh rugby team

(Wales) Felinfoel RFC
- Full name: Felinfoel Rugby Football Club
- Founded: 1876
- Location: Felinfoel, Wales
- Ground(s): St. George Field, Felinfoel, Llanelli
- President: Phil Bennett, OBE
- League: WRU Division One West
- 2017-18: 1st
Team kit

Official website
- www.felinfoel.rfc.wales

Felinfoel RFC is a Welsh rugby union club representing the town of Felinfoel, Llanelli, West Wales. Felinfoel RFC is a member of the Welsh Rugby Union and is a feeder club for Llanelli Scarlets.

== Club honours ==
- WRU Division Two West - 2007/08 - Champions. (Perfect season, 22 games played - 22 games won)

== Notable former players ==
The following players have represented Felinfoel and have been capped at senior international level

- Phil Bennett OBE, (29 caps), British Lions, Wales & Llanelli captain.
- Brian Butler, Wales Youth, Llanelli & Bradford Northern Rugby League
- (Wales) William Harries "Bill" Clement (6 caps)
- (Wales) Brinley E. Evans
- (Wales) Bryn Evans
- Ian Stuart Gallacher, Llanelli, Wales Youth, Wales, Bradford Northern, R.L.
- (Wales) Elvet Jones
- Roy Mathias, Llanelli, Wales Youth, Wales, St.Helens RL & Great Britain Rugby League.
- (Wales) William "Bill" Morris (3 caps)
- David Nicholas, Wales Schoolboys, Wales Youth, Wales, Llanelli (4 caps)
- (Wales) Gareth Rees, Glamorgan Cricket
- Colin Stephens, Wales Schoolboys, Wales, Llanelli
- (Wales) Watcyn Thomas
- (Wales) Nathaniel "Danny" Walters
- John Douglas Warlow Llanelli, Wales, St.Helens R.L.
- (Wales) William Watts
- (Wales) Ossie Williams
- (Wales) Henry Raymond "Ray" Williams
- (Wales) Stanley "Stan" Williams
