= Elvet Jones =

British Lions & Wales international rugby union player (1912–1989)

- Born: Elfed Lewis Jones; 29 April 1912 Llanelli, Wales
- Died: 5 October 1989 (aged 77) Llanelli, Wales
- School: Llanelli County School
- Occupation: Magistrate's clerk

Rugby union career
- Position: Wing
Amateur team(s)
Years	Team	Apps	(Points)
- Llanelli Harlequins
1932-1939	Llanelli RFC		
International career
Years	Team	Apps	(Points)
1938	British Lions	2	(3)
1939	Wales	1	(0)

Elfed Lewis "Elvet" Jones MBE (29 April 1912 – 5 October 1989) was a Welsh rugby union whose international career was curtailed due to the outbreak of the Second World War. He played club rugby for Llanelli, and in 1938 he was selected to tour South Africa with the British Isles team.

== Rugby career ==
Jones began playing rugby as a schoolboy for his local county school, joining Llanelli Harlequins as a senior. By the 1932/33 season he was playing for first-class team Llanelli, ending that season as top try scorer for the club with 15. Jones was again highest try scorer for Llanelli in the following season, this time ending with 23 tries. In the 1934/35 season Jones continued to score regularly, but his 16 try tally was surpassed by fellow wing Bill Clement. The next season Jones regained his leading try scorer title with 20, and he also experienced his first international opposition as the touring New Zealand team came to Llanelli on 22 October 1935. Jones was selected to face the tourists, though failed to score in a game won 16-8 by New Zealand. During the 1936–37 season Jones was selected as senior team captain, and led the team to one of their most successful seasons scoring a record 699 points. Jones showed his commitment to Llanelli and the amateur game by refusing three approaches to join the professional Northern League, all offers rumoured to have involved a signing-on fee of £400.

In 1938, despite not being selected for his national team, he was chosen to tour South Africa as a part of Bernard Charles Hartley's British Isles team along with team-mate Clement. Clement had been a first choice selection, but Jones was a later choice following the withdrawal of Harlequins wing F.J.V. Ford. Despite playing in only 12 of the 24 matches of the tour, Jones finished as the tour's highest try scorer with ten, including the first British try against the South Africa team, in the third and final Test of the series. Twice in the tour he scored a hat-trick of tries, against the South Western Districts and then Rhodesia.

During the 1938/39 season, Jones was selected for his one and only international cap. Chosen for the second match of the 1938 Home Nations Championship, Jones was one of three different wings chosen opposite Syd Williams. The first match of the tournament saw F.J.V. Ford win his one and only cap, but Jones replaced him for the encounter against Scotland. Despite an 11–3 win, Jones was himself replaced for the final match to Ireland by Chris Matthews. The 1939/40 season would be Jones' last before the outbreak of the Second World War. Only one match was played, before the Welsh Rugby Union declared the cessation of competitive rugby, against Felinfoel. Jones was Llanelli captain for the match. Jones ended his career with Llanelli as one of their highest try scorers, with a career total of 129, one of the few players to have scored over a hundred tries for the club.

After the war, Jones continued his connection with rugby and Llanelli by becoming club chairman from 1960 through to 1967 and then serving as club president from 1978 to 1981. It was in his role as chairman, that in 1964 at the annual general meeting of the Welsh Rugby Union, that Jones made a key speech where he attacked both the WRU and Welsh clubs for neglecting coaching; instead 'concentrating too much on physical fitness and neglected... basic skills and tactics. He went on to claim that Welsh rugby 'at international and club level had deteriorated and even international players lack the ability to handle the ball accurately...' Jones pleaded for the Welsh Coaching Committee to be reconstituted and that the WRU should consider appointing an official rugby coach with several assistants, lest the AGM of the WRU 'degenerate into a meeting of social, instead of rugby, clubs.' In 1967, the WRU hired their first international coach, David Nash. A constant believer in the progress of rugby, in the 1964/65 Llanelli RFC annual meeting, he announced the need to create a 'seconds team' to bridge the gap between Youth and Senior teams.

An Elvet Jones represented Wales in the Victory Internationals after the war, but he represented Cardiff and Neath.

=== International games played ===
Wales

- Scotland 1939

British Isles

- South Africa 1938, 1938

== Personal history ==
Jones was born in Llanelli in 1912, and was educated at Llanelli County School. He was a magistrate's clerk by profession, and after the outbreak of the Second World War he joined the Royal Air Force. He rose to the rank of squadron leader and received the Belgian Military Cross. He was later awarded an MBE.

== Biography ==
- Griffiths, John (1990). British Lions. Swindon: Crowood Press. ISBN 1-85223-541-1.
- Hughes, Gareth (1986). The Scarlets: A History of Llanelli Rugby Club. Llanelli: Llanelli Borough Council. ISBN 0-906821-05-3.
- Smith, David; Williams, Gareth (1980). Fields of Praise: The Official History of The Welsh Rugby Union. Cardiff: University of Wales Press. ISBN 0-7083-0766-3.
