= Pentremawr Colliery =

Defunct coal mine in South Wales

Coordinates: 51.773°N 4.185°W

Pentremawr Colliery (or Capel Ifan Colliery) was a coal mine, located in the Gwendraeth valley in Carmarthenshire, South Wales.

Due to the angle and depth of the anthracite in this part of Wales, Pentremawr was a slant mine, and hence access and extraction of the coal did not need a shaft. However, the commercial extraction of coal is limited by geological faults in the area.

The first two attempts were aborted in 1870, after a huge fault was encountered. But eventually three slants known as Capel Ifan No's 1, 2 and 3 were opened to the Gwendraeth, Braslyd, Gras and Trichwart seams. By 1896, there were 160 men working at the colliery, and it was during this time of operation that Colliery Chief Mechanic Jones Jones (1879–1976), invented the renowned Pontyberem safety lamp.

In 1913, a fourth slant was driven to work the Pumquart seam, and so by 1923 there were 956 men working at the colliery. In 1927, Pentremawr Colliery Company Ltd. was absorbed into the Amalgamated Anthracite Combine, with records showing that 1,007 men employed. The company ploughed in money to fix problems associated with the initial local geological fault, resulting in the discovery of the 8-foot-thick (2.4 m) Big Vein seam in 1939. Post World War II, in 1956 900 men produced 226,273 tons.

Due to the geological faults in the area, the mine was susceptible to incursion from methane gas. Two miners were killed from explosions caused by methane gas and coal dust explosions in 1945, and one in 1965. But on 1 September 1966, Pentremawr was the site of the largest outburst of methane and fine coal dust in the UK, when 1,000 tons of coal dust erupted from the Big Vein: no one was killed on that occasion. However, on 6 April 1971, six men were killed and 69 others suffered varying degrees of asphyxia.

Developing geological problems brought about the closure of the No.4 Pumquart slant in 1968. In 1974, the National Coal Board amalgamated Pentremawr with the Cynheidre Colliery, which itself closed in 1989.

== Proposed opencast development ==
In 2009, Draeth Developments proposed developing the site of Pentremawr to extract 300,000 tonnes of coal via an opencast mining development. Opposed by local residents and Llanelli MP Nia Griffith and AM Helen Mary Jones, the scheme is subject to planning permission.
