= Brian Butler (rugby) =

Wales dual-code rugby international footballer

Personal information
- Full name: Brian Leslie Butler
- Born: 16 February 1948 (age 77); Llanelli, Wales

Playing information

Rugby union
- Position: Prop
Club
Years	Team	Pld	T	G	FG	P
	Felinfoel RFC
≤1968–70	Llanelli RFC
	Total	0	0	0	0	0
Representative
Years	Team	Pld	T	G	FG	P
	Wales

Rugby league
- Position: Prop
Club
Years	Team	Pld	T	G	FG	P
1970–73	Bradford Northern	66	7	1	0	23
1973–75	Swinton	62	2	0	0	6
1975–77	Warrington	55	4	0	0	12
	Total	183	13	1	0	41
Representative
Years	Team	Pld	T	G	FG	P
1974	Other Nationalities	3	0	0	0	0
1975–77	Wales	4

Brian Leslie Butler (born 16 February 1948) is a Welsh former rugby union and professional rugby league footballer who played in the 1960s and 1970s. He played representative level rugby union (RU) for a 'Wales XV', and at club level for Felinfoel RFC and Llanelli RFC, as a prop and representative level rugby league (RL) for Wales, and at club level for Bradford Northern, Swinton and Warrington, as a prop.

== Background ==
Brian Butler was born in Llanelli, Wales.

== Rugby union career ==
Butler first came to prominence as a rugby union player when he represented Felinfoel. Like many other players before him, he moved from Feloinfoel to neighbouring Llanelli where he played as prop. In the 1967–68 season he was a regular in the first team, opposite Byron Gale with club captain Norman Gale completing the front row. Although never capped for the Wales national team he was selected to tour Argentina in 1968 as part of a select 'Wales XV'. Butler played against Argentina on 14 September at Buenos Aires; the Wales XV lost 9–5, no caps were awarded at the time, but he was later awarded a Welsh Rugby Union President's cap.

In June 1970 Butler, along with club-mate Stuart Gallacher switched to professional rugby league, joining Bradford Northern. This act severed his ties with rugby union and he never played the sport again.

== Rugby league career ==
=== International honours ===
Brian Butler won caps for Wales (RL) while at Swinton in the 1975 Rugby League World Cup against France, New Zealand, and France, and while at Warrington in 1977 against France.

=== Club career ===
Brian Butler was transferred from Swinton to Warrington in exchange for David Chisnall, he made his début for Warrington on Sunday 12 October 1975, and he played his last match for Warrington on Sunday 20 March 1977.
