= David Nicholas (disambiguation) =

David Nicholas (born 1991) is an Australian cyclist.

David Nicholas may also refer to:

- David Nicholas, English form of Dafydd Nicolas (c.1705–1774), Welsh poet
- Dai Nicholas (David Nicholas, 1897–1982), footballer
- David Nicholas (journalist) (1930–2022), British journalist
- David Nicholas, music producer on Reasons for Voyaging
- David Nicholas (rugby union) (born 1955), Welsh rugby union player
