= Llanelli and Mynydd Mawr Railway =

Heritage railway in Carmarthenshire, Wales

Coordinates: 51.74356°N 4.1833°W

This article describes the current heritage railway. For the historical railway, see Llanelly and Mynydd Mawr Railway.

Logo of the Llanelli and Mynydd Mawr Railway charity

The Llanelli and Mynydd Mawr Railway (Note: In Welsh, Llanelli and Mynydd Mawr are pronounced [ɬaˈnɛɬi] and [ˈmənɨð ˈmaur], respectively.) is a heritage railway whose stated aims are to reinstate as much of the former Llanelly and Mynydd Mawr Railway as possible, which had closed originally in 1989.

== History ==
The Llanelly and Mynydd Mawr Railway (LMMR), earlier known as the Carmarthenshire Tramroad, was established in 1802 in Wales by an Act of Parliament. It began running trains in 1803, with the initial line being a plateway with motive power provided by a pair of horses. The LMMR is claimed to be the oldest public railway in Great Britain. Although the Surrey Iron Railway was the first to be incorporated, it is believed that the LMMR was the first to open to traffic.

The Carmarthenshire Tramroad closed in 1844 but the railway reopened in 1883, operated by the newly formed Llanelly and Mynydd Mawr Railway Co. That company disappeared in 1922 on being absorbed into the Great Western Railway, which was itself absorbed into British Railways in 1947. Throughout the twentieth century, the line continued as a main artery for coal distribution from the Gwendraeth valley, until the closure of Cynheidre Colliery in 1989.

== Llanelli and District Railway Society ==
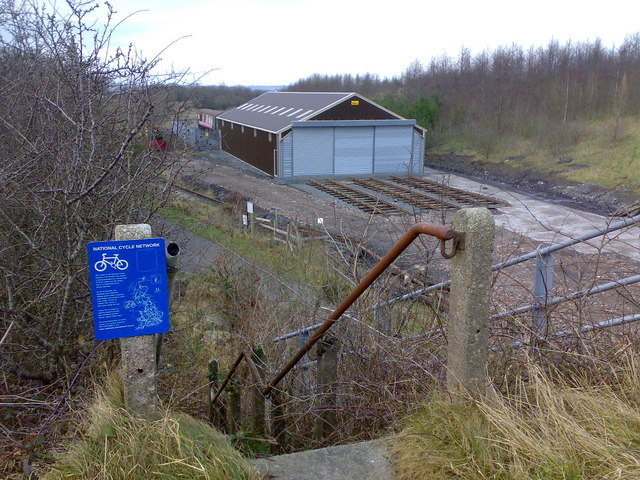
Early days of the L&MMR, with development of the locomotive shed, 2008

The Llanelli and District Railway Society (L&DRS) ran an unsuccessful campaign lasting almost ten years to save the intact but derelict line. The railway was sold in the mid 1990s by the British Rail property board to the local authorities as part of a scheme to transform the track bed into a cycle way. This path is now labelled as the Swiss Valley Cycle Route, part of National Cycle Route 47, itself a part of the Celtic Trail.

== Llanelli and Mynydd Mawr Railway Company Limited ==
Whilst the L&DRS's efforts were thwarted, a new charitable company (Registered Charity No. 1087985) was incorporated on 13 August 2001. It is a non-profit making company, limited by guarantee.

The company is named The Llanelli and Mynydd Mawr Railway Company Ltd, therefore reviving the name of the former operator albeit with the later Llanelli spelling. The primary stated objective of the charity is to reinstate a railway along the historic line. A heritage centre also interprets the history of coal mining in the area, even in particular the industry which the railway itself once served.

The charity's scheme will utilise derelict land on the site of the former colliery, which is now owned by the LMMR outright as of 2025. In the long-term, the railway, which closed to rail traffic in 1989, aims to be reinstated where possible. Work at the site at Cynheidre, near Llanelli, is currently progressing. The first phase will include the placing of a locomotive shed on site, as well as making the site available to the public. The primary objective is to achieve a running line of one mile (1.6 km) consisting of a platform, locomotive shed, heritage centre, gift shop and café. As of February 2025, the locomotive shed had been fully constructed and this allowed for the rolling stock to be transported to the site on 19–22 November 2007.

The railway held its first public open day on Sunday 3 September 2017, which saw the railway operate brake van rides using Sentinel 0-4-0DH shunter no. 10222 and BR Brakevan no. 981287.

== Rolling stock ==
The LMMR operates and, in some cases, owns the following rolling stock:

=== Steam ===
- 1498 Avonside Engine Company 0-4-0ST named Desmond: built 1908, currently located at the Flour Mill, Lydney pending restoration.

=== Diesel locomotives ===
- No. 10222 0-4-0DH Sentinel Waggon Works (Rolls-Royce) diesel shunter.
- No. 08795 0-6-0DE English Electric Class 08 diesel shunter: ex-Great Western Railway), currently located at Chrysalis Rail, Landore depot.
- No. 73130 Bo-Bo Class 73 electro-diesel locomotive: ex-European Passenger Services, owned by 73130 Ltd)

=== Diesel multiple units ===
In addition to a Class 122 Bubble Car unit, the L&MMR is currently host to four Pacers:

- No. 55019 Class 122
- No. 142006 Class 142
- No. 143606 Class 143
- No. 143607 Class 143
- No. 143612 Class 143: Owned by the Vale of Berkeley Railway).

=== Electric multiple units ===
- No. 313201 Class 313: owned by the 400 Series Preservation Group.
- No. 466043 Class 466: owned by the East Kent Railway.
- No. 315856 Class 315: owned by the Class 315 Preservation Society.
- 4-EPB car no. 14351 Class 415: owned by the Suburban Electric Preservation Association.
- No. 483006 Class 483: owned by the London Transport Traction Group
- No. 483008 Class 483: owned by the London Transport Traction Group.

=== Coaching stock ===
- No. 1206 Mark 2 RFB first class British Rail (BR) Buffet Car, built 1973.

=== Wagons ===
- No. 35377 GWR Toad Brake van
- No. B951287 BR Brake van
- No. 48325 BR Tar Wagon (circa 1939)
- No. 40225 BR Tar Wagon (circa 1950)
- No. 40229 BR Tar Wagon (circa 1950)
- Tippler Wagon: cut down to flat bed wagon
- No. 2135 GWR Bloater Fish Van (circa 1919).
