= Felinfoel =

Village in Carmarthenshire, Wales

Coordinates: 51.698°N 4.147°W

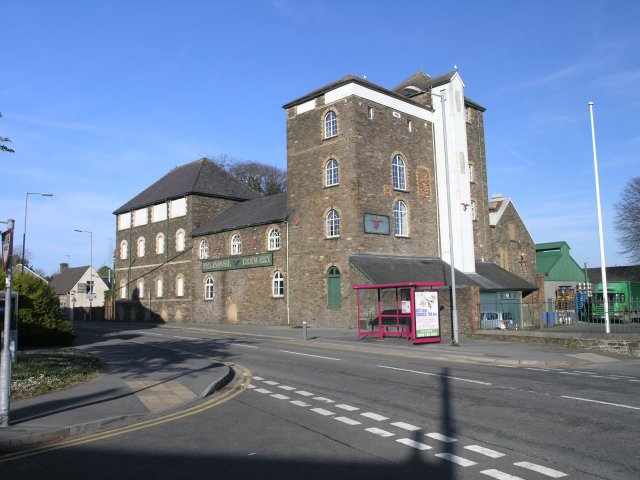
- Felinfoel Brewery

- Location within Carmarthenshire
- Population: Not Recorded; See Llanelli Rural
- OS grid reference: SN519024
- Community: Llanelli Rural
- Principal area: Carmarthenshire
- Preserved county: Dyfed
- Country: Wales
- Sovereign state: United Kingdom
- Post town: LLANELLI
- Postcode district: SA14-15
- Dialling code: 01554
- Police: Dyfed-Powys
- Fire: Mid and West Wales
- Ambulance: Welsh
- UK Parliament: Llanelli
- Senedd Cymru – Welsh Parliament: Sir Gaerfyrddin

Felinfoel (pronounced /vɛlɪnvɔɪl/) is a small village and electoral ward on the River Lliedi on the northern border of Llanelli, Carmarthenshire, West Wales, with a population of about 2,000.

The Felinfoel Brewery, home of Double Dragon Ale, is the oldest in Wales. It was the first brewery outside the US to sell beer in cans.

The village is renowned for its close community and ties with many famous names that have starred in past Llanelli RFC line-ups. The rugby union fly-half Phil Bennett, who played for Llanelli, Wales and the British Lions, was one of Felinfoel's most famous residents until his death in 2022.

Felinfoel is part of the Llanelli Rural community. It is generally considered a suburb of the town of Llanelli.

== Local amenities ==
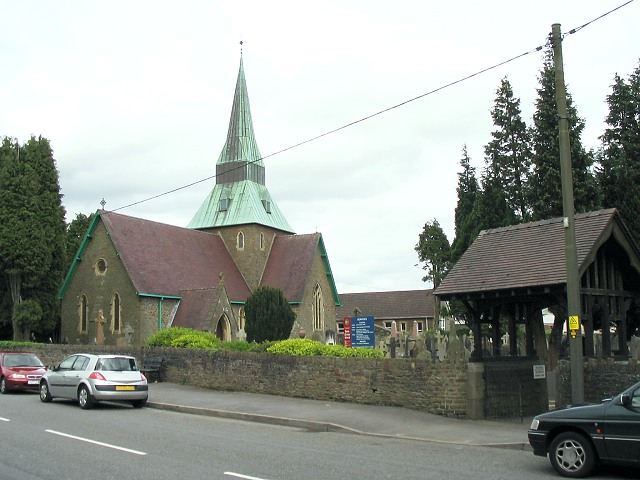
Holy Trinity church, Felinfoel

Felinfoel has a butcher's, a bakery, a fish and chip shop, locally produced real ale from the historic Felinfoel Brewery and shop, a Co-op supermarket and a computer shop within the village.

It is a small village with a parish church and Nonconformist chapel. The Diplomat Hotel and Edens Health Spa and Gym health spa also fall within the village's borders.

To the north of the village and on the River Lliedi is a double reservoir which gives the Swiss Valley area its name.

Felinfoel's main Baptist chapel, Adulam, plays a significant role in the history of that Nonconformist sect, as it is on the site of Ty Newydd, said by some to be the oldest Baptist settlement in Wales. Previously, the outlawed creed held its meetings in secret in Ogof Goetre Wen on the Morlais River some four miles away. Adulam's baptismal pool on the River Lleidi was in use for total immersions until the 1970s. The congregation would sit on the railway sleeper benches, and on the bridge over the river, and sing as the person was raised from the water.

== Demographics ==
=== Languages ===
According to the United Kingdom Census 2021, 25.5 per cent of all usual residents aged 3+ in Felinfoel can speak Welsh. 40.6 per cent of the population noted that they could speak, read, write or understand Welsh. The 2011 census noted 28.1 per cent of all usual residents aged 3 years and older in the village could speak Welsh.

== Notable people ==
- David Bowen (1774–1853), a Welsh Baptist minister.
- Company Sergeant Major Ivor Rees VC (1893–1967), a Welsh recipient of the Victoria Cross
- Ray Williams (1927–2014), international rugby union wing who played club rugby for Felinfoel, Llanelli and Wales.
- Phil Bennett OBE (1948–2022), a Welsh rugby union player for Felinfoel Youth, Llanelli RFC and the Wales national team. Member of the invincible 1974 British Lions tour to South Africa and captain of the 1977 British Lions touring team to New Zealand; a Test Barbarian.

== Governance ==
An electoral ward of the same name exists, sending councillors to Llanelli Rural Council and Carmarthenshire County Council. The population of this ward falls entirely within the Llanelli Rural community. The total population of the ward taken at the 2011 census was 2,054.

== Transport ==
Felinfoel has good links with the M4 motorway which leads to Swansea and Cardiff to the east and Carmarthen and Pembrokeshire in the west. The village is also linked by regular local bus services to Llanelli railway station.

== See also ==
- Felin Foel railway station
