= Ray Williams (rugby union, born 1927) =

Welsh rugby player (1927–2014)

- Born: Henry Raymond Williams; 27 November 1927 Felinfoel, Wales
- Died: 5 January 2014 (aged 86) Llanelli
- School: Llanelli Grammar School
- University: St Luke's College, Exeter; Cardiff College of Education
- Occupation: School teacher

Rugby union career
- Position: Wing
Amateur team(s)
Years	Team	Apps	(Points)
- St Luke's College, Exeter
–	Cardiff College of Education		
–	Felinfoel RFC		
–	Llanelli RFC		
International career
Years	Team	Apps	(Points)
1954–1958	Wales	3	(3)

Henry Raymond "Ray" Williams (13 November 1927 – 5 January 2014) was a Welsh international rugby union wing who played club rugby for Felinfoel and Llanelli. Williams was capped three times for Wales, playing between 1954 and 1958. He was also a mentor credited with a significant contribution to the success of Barry John.

== Bibliography ==
- Davies, D.E. (1975). Cardiff Rugby Club, History and Statistics 1876-1975. Risca: The Starling Press. ISBN 0-9504421-0-0.
- Godwin, Terry (1984). The International Rugby Championship 1883-1983. London: Willows Books. ISBN 0-00-218060-X.
- Jenkins, John M.; Auty, Timothy & Pierce, Duncan (1991). Who's Who of Welsh International Rugby Players. Wrexham: Bridge Books. ISBN 1-872424-10-4.
- Jones, Stephen & Beken, Paul (1985). Dragon in Exile, The Centenary History of London Welsh R.F.C. London: Springwood Books. ISBN 0-86254-125-5.
- Smith, David; Williams, Gareth (1980). Fields of Praise: The Official History of The Welsh Rugby Union. Cardiff: University of Wales Press. ISBN 0-7083-0766-3.
- Starmer-Smith, Nigel (1977). The Barbarians. Macdonald & Jane's Publishers. ISBN 0-86007-552-4.
