= Carmarthenshire Railway or Tramroad =

Plateway in west Wales (1803–1844)

Overview
- Headquarters: Llanelli
- Locale: Wales
- Dates of operation: 1803–1844
- Successor: Llanelly and Mynydd Mawr Railway

Technical
- Track gauge: 4 ft (1,219 mm)
- Length: 11 1/2 mi (18.5 km)

The Carmarthenshire Railway or Tramroad was a horse-worked plateway built in South Wales in 1803.

== History ==
Carmarthenshire Railway or Tramroad Company Act 1802
- Act of Parliament
- Parliament of the United Kingdom
- Long title: An Act for making and maintaining a Railway or Tramroad, from or from near a certain Place called The Flats, in the Parish of Llanelly, in the County of Carmarthen, to or near to certain Lime Rocks, called Castell-y-Garreg, in the Parish of Llanfihangel-Aberbythich, in the said County; and for making and maintaining a Dock or Bason at the Termination of the said Railway or Tramroad, at or near the said Place called The Flats.
- Citation: 42 Geo. 3. c. lxxx

Dates
- Royal assent: 3 June 1802

Text of statute as originally enacted

Carmarthenshire Railway or Tramroad Company Act 1834
- Act of Parliament
- Parliament of the United Kingdom
- Long title: An Act to enable the Carmarthenshire Railway or Tramroad Company to raise a further Sum of Money, and to amend the Act relating to the said Company.
- Citation: 4 & 5 Will. 4. c. lxx

Dates
- Royal assent: 27 June 1834

Text of statute as originally enacted

The Carmarthenshire Railway or Tramroad was authorised under an act of Parliament, the Carmarthenshire Railway or Tramroad Company Act 1802 (42 Geo. 3. c. lxxx), of 3 June 1802 – the first granted for a public railway in Wales – to acquire the existing Carmarthenshire Dock at Llanelly and its feeder tramroad built by Alexander Raby by 1799, thus incidentally becoming the world's first dock-owning public railway company. The first 1 1/2 mi (2.4 km) from Cwmddyche ironworks down to the sea was open in May 1803 – the first stretch of public railway in use in Britain – and construction ceased in 1805 when the line had reached Gorslas. The engineer was named James Barnes and the gauge was approximately 4 ft (1,219 mm).

The line ceased to operate in or before 1844 and portions of its course were utilised by the Llanelly and Mynydd Mawr Railway, opened in 1881.
