= Cefn Sidan =

Beach in Carmarthenshire, Wales

Coordinates: 51.7024°N 4.3746°W

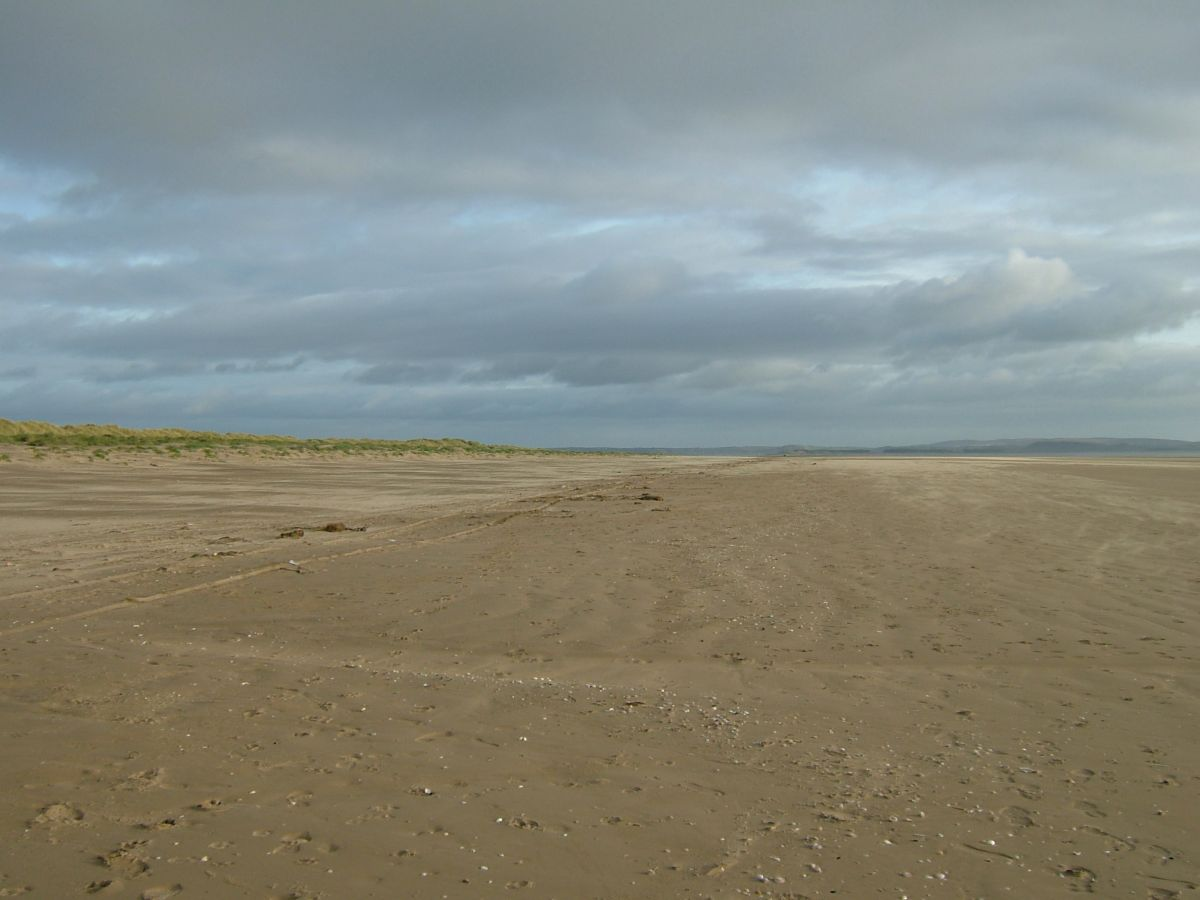
Cefn Sidan beach

Cefn Sidan (Welsh for 'silky ridge'; also known as Pembrey beach) is a long sandy beach with dunes, which form the outer edge of the Pembrey Burrows between Burry Port and Kidwelly, facing southwestwards over Carmarthen Bay in South Wales. Cefn Sidan beach is backed by dunes, salt marshes, Pembrey Forest and the Pembrey Country Park.

== Geography ==
Cefn Sidan stretches for nearly eight miles from the coastal town of Burry Port to Tywyn Point at the mouth of the Gwendraeth estuary near Kidwelly. The sand has small grains and the beach is backed by dunes of windblown sand. There are sand bars projecting as shoals into Carmarthen Bay at either end of the beach. The beach has a life guard patrolling during the summer months and can be accessed by ten approach routes where notices provide information for visitors. Pembrey Forest, the Saltings nature reserve and Pembrey Country Park are inland from the beach, and RAF Pembrey is also sited here.

== Wrecks ==
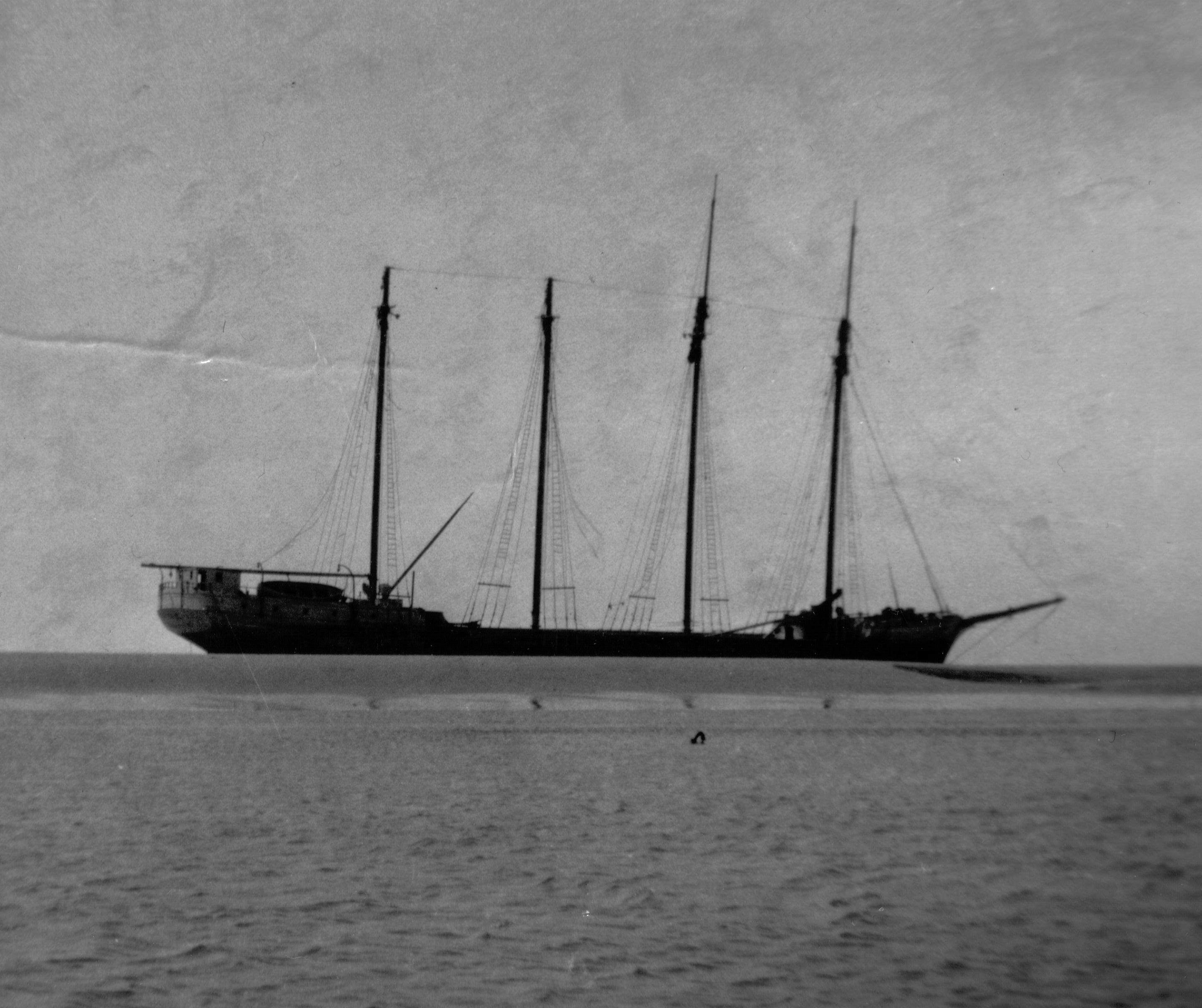
The SV Paul on Cefn Sidan in 1925

The sands were treacherous to sailing ships and a number of vessels were certainly lost around Pembrey, including "La Jeune Emma" bound from the West Indies to France and blown badly off course in 1828. 13 of the 19 on board drowned, including Adeline Coquelin, the 12-year-old niece of Napoleon Bonaparte's divorced wife Josephine de Beauharnais. She is buried at St. Illtyds Church, Pembrey. The last large ship to be lost was the four masted windjammer, the SV Paul, carrying a cargo of timber and grounding in a storm in 1925. Today Cefn Sidan forms part of the Pembrey Country Park leisure and nature complex.

The beach is used by naturists, although this is not encouraged by the local council.

The beach is visually spectacular because of the fine structure of its sand granules – however, this makes it unsuitable for making stable structures beyond simple sand castles. On Sunday 3 August 2008 a 16-year-old boy was trapped when the tunnel he was digging in the sand dunes behind the beach collapsed. Swansea Coastguard said the alarm was raised around 19:10 BST, and a Burry Port coastguard team arrived within 15 minutes. After a helicopter air ambulance transfer to Morriston Hospital in Swansea, doctors pronounced him dead.

== See also ==
- Pembrey Circuit
- Pembrey Airport
- Court Farm, Pembrey
