= SV Paul =

Coordinates: 51.7332°N 4.3749°W

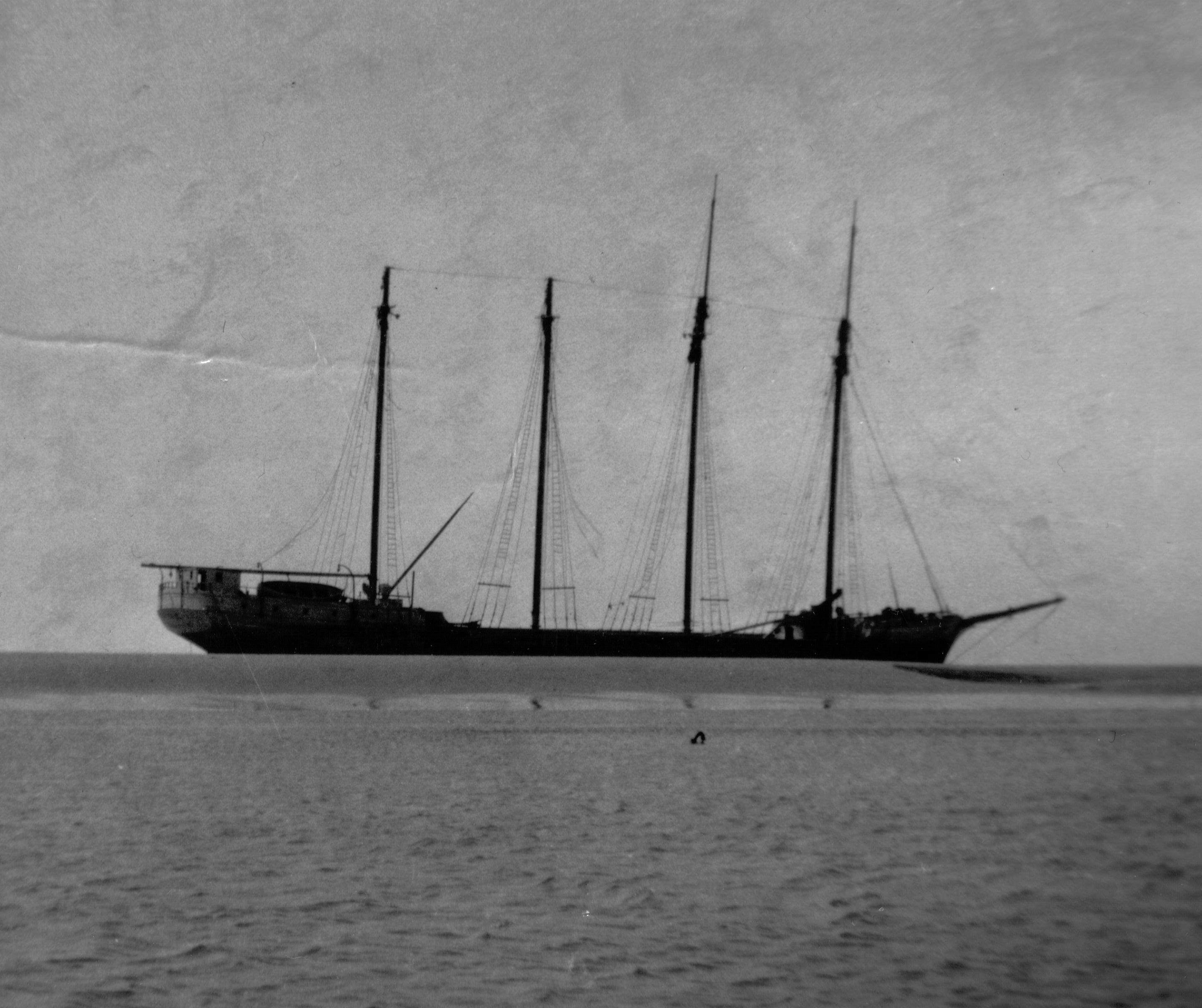
- The SV Paul on Cefn Sidan sands in 1925

History
- Name: Paul
- Port of registry: Hamburg
- Route: Halifax to Dublin
- Builder: Seattle
- Launched: 1919
- Christened: Mount Whitney
- In service: 1919
- Out of service: 1925
- Fate: Wrecked 1925
- Notes: 'Mount Whitney' and 'Margaret Sayer' were previous names

General characteristics
- Type: Windjammer
- Tonnage: 1,538 tons
- Length: 230 ft (70 m)
- Beam: 45 ft (14 m)
- Height: 18 ft (5.5 m)
- Installed power: Sails
- Crew: 15

SV Paul was a four-masted fore-and-aft rigged windjammer, launched in Seattle in 1919. Originally named Mount Whitney she was sold to new German owners in 1924 and renamed Margaret Sayer, finally in 1925 she was acquired by Flensburg owners and renamed Paul. The vessel was wrecked in 1925.

== Shipwreck and salvage ==
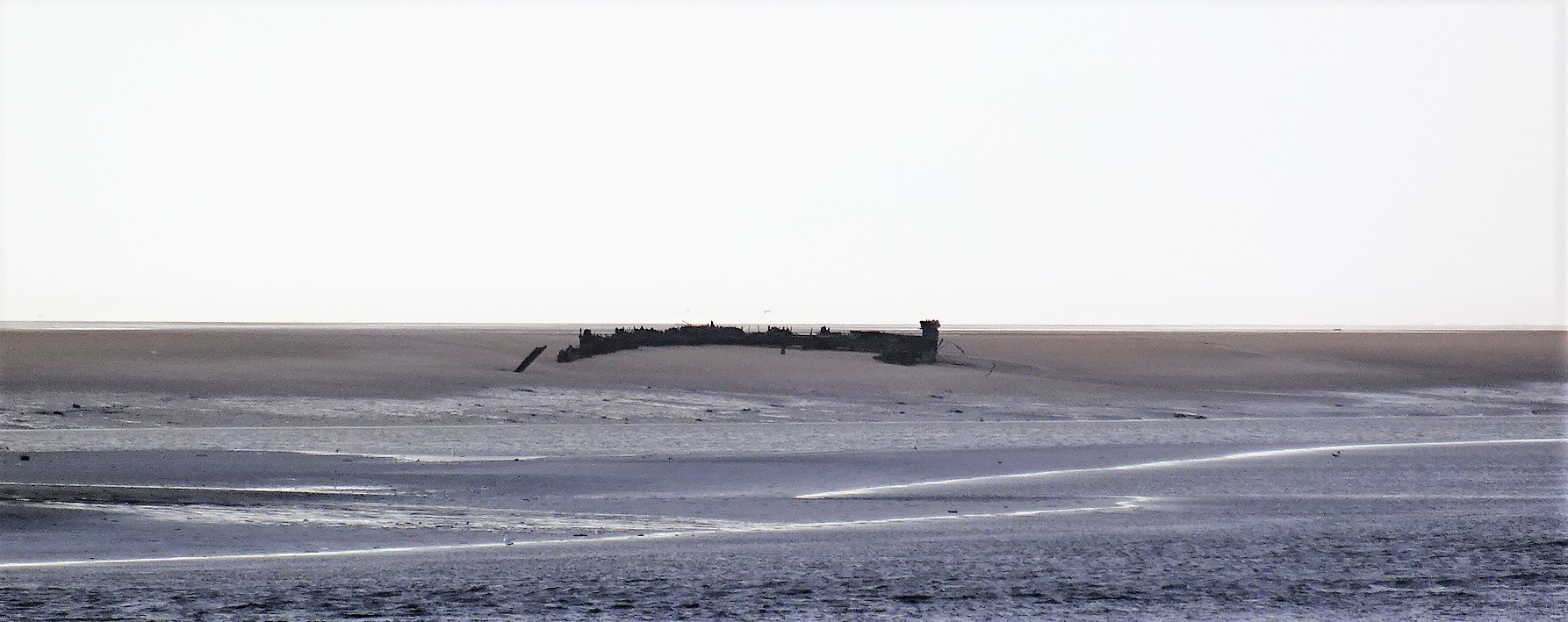
The wreck of the SV Paul in 2018

In 1925 the Paul crossed the Atlantic from Cádiz to St. John, Newfoundland and loaded 2,000 tons of timber at Halifax for Dublin. On 30 October she ran into severe gales, losing many sails and her anchors; eventually grounding on the Cefn Sidan sands as, without any auxiliary motive power, she was unable to make an escape. On this occasion she had a crew of twelve, including a cook, the master and a teenage stewardess. Another reference cites her grounding as being on 5 November 1925.

Several tugs came up from Cardiff and failed in an attempt to refloat her. A salvage company took on 26 local men and salvaged the timber cargo. Most of the timber was made into rafts and floated over to the nearby railway line at Bertwn.

== Archaeology ==
Pembrey's Cefn Sidan translates as 'silken back', describing the smooth flat stretch of over 7 miles of sand. Of the 182 vessels that are recorded to have been wrecked there, the Paul is the largest remaining timber wreck to be seen on the Cefn Sidan sands. The unloaded hulk has shifted position, and coastline alterations mean that she now lies within the Gwendraeth estuary. Her massive construction, combined with the site's protection from the worst of the storms, has meant that the wreck has slowly broken up. The substantial timbers, held together by innumerable wrought-iron fastenings, are still apparent. Much has been stripped from the wreck over the years, and bullet holes indicate its use as a target before the establishment of the holiday camp.

== Local history ==
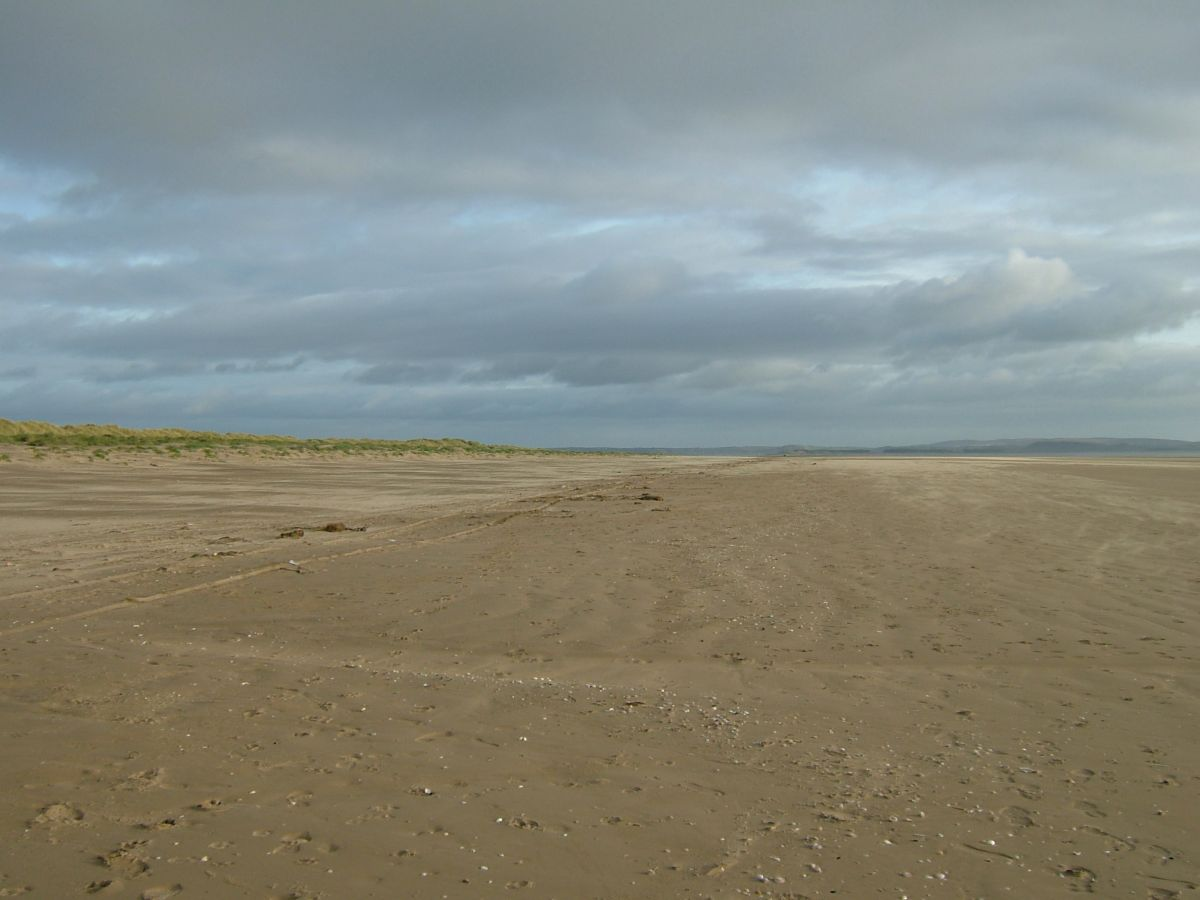
Part of the Cefn Sidan sands

Significant quantities of the Paul's cargo are said to have ended up in the hands of locals. Long prior to the Paul's loss, locals had become known as the 'Gwyr-y-bwelli-bach' (literally hatchet men), because in local legend they were accused of displaying lights to confuse and then attract shipping onto the sands. A so-called 'Wrecker's' window survives in Bryn Towi cottage on the lane running up to Tanylan Farm from the Gwendraeth and the old farm of Tanylan Isaf (previously Danylan) nearby has beams made from ship's timbers.

The aforementioned hatchets of the gwyr-y-bwelli-bach were said used to have been used to cut off swollen fingers of casualties bearing gold rings, etc. Fifty arrests are known to have been made of locals plundering wrecked vessels over the years and at least thirty mariners are unfortunate enough to have perished on the sands of the Cefn Sidan area.

According to local accounts, an attempt to salvage the entire ship failed. The ship was filled below deck with barrels, in the hope that the extra buoyancy would raise the ship at high tide. Unfortunately, all this achieved was that the decking gave way under the force, ruining most of the integrity of the ship and making it practically impossible to salvage whole. Part of the wreck was still there as of 2024.

== See also ==
- List of shipwrecks
