= John Ford (rugby union) =

- Full name: Frederick John Vivian Ford
- Born: 13 October 1917 Redcar, Yorkshire, England
- Died: 15 December 2000 (aged 83) Guildford, Surrey, England
- School: Imperial Service College

Rugby union career
- Position: Wing
International career
| Years | Team | Apps | (Points) |
| 1939 | Wales | 1 | (0) |

Frederick John Vivian Ford (13 October 1917 — 15 December 2000) was a Welsh international rugby union player.

Ford was born in Redcar, Yorkshire, and educated at the Imperial Service College, Windsor. After attending Sandhurst, Ford served with the Welch Regiment, by virtue of which he qualified for Wales.

A wing three-quarter, Ford played his club rugby for Harlequins and in the army. He won selection for the 1938 British Lions tour of South Africa, but was unable to make the trip, with his place going to Elvet Jones. The following year, Ford gained his solitary Wales cap in a Home Nations match against England at Twickenham.

Ford, a major, served in Crete during World War II and was held as a prisoner of war in 1941.

== See also ==
- List of Wales national rugby union players
