= David Nicholas (rugby union) =

- Full name: David Llewellyn Nicholas
- Born: 3 March 1955 (age 71) Llanelli, Wales

Rugby union career
- Position: Wing
International career
Years	Team	Apps	(Points)
1981	Wales	4	(0)

David Llewellyn Nicholas (born 3 March 1955) is a Welsh former rugby union international.

Nicholas, a Ysgol y Strade product, was capped four times for Wales in the 1981 Five Nations. He was used by Wales on the left wing, but had been a fly-half in underage representative rugby. According to his Llanelli coach Carwyn James, Nicholas was an elusive player who made up for his lack of blistering pace by guile. He also played for Felinfoel RFC.

== See also ==
- List of Wales national rugby union players
