= Bill Clement (rugby union) =

British Lions & Wales international rugby union player (1915–2007)

- Born: William Harries Clement; 9 April 1915 Llanelli, Wales
- Died: 10 February 2007 (aged 91)
- Height: 5 ft 10 in (1.78 m)
- Weight: 11 st 0 lb (70 kg)
- School: Llanelli County School
- Occupation: accountant

Rugby union career
- Position: Wing
Amateur team(s)
Years	Team	Apps	(Points)
–	Felinfoel RFC		
?–1938	Llanelli RFC		
International career
Years	Team	Apps	(Points)
1937–1938	Wales	6	(3)
1938	British Isles	0	(0)

William Harries Clement OBE MC TD (9 April 1915 – 10 February 2007) was a Welsh international wing who played club rugby for Llanelli and was capped six times for Wales. Clement was described as a staunch tackler with speed and a good turn of pace; and after his appearance for the British Isles was seen as the best defensive wing of the decade. In his later career he became Secretary of the Welsh Rugby Union.

He served as an infantry officer in the British Army during the Second World War, and was decorated during the Normandy Campaign, and twice wounded.

== Rugby playing career ==
Clement was selected to the Wales team while playing for Llanelli, the team he captained during the 1938/39 season. On 22 October 1935, he was part of the Llanelli team that faced the touring New Zealand national team.

In 1937, Clement was selected to represent the Welsh team as part of the 1937 Home Nations Championship under the captaincy of Claude Davey. It was a terrible campaign for Wales and Clement as the team lost all three matches; though Clement showed his team playing skills when he unselfishly set up a try for Wilf Wooller in the opening game against England.

The selectors kept faith with Clement, and he returned for the entirety of the 1938 campaign, this time with Cliff Jones leading the team. Wales beat England in the opening game and just lost to Scotland three weeks later at Murrayfield. In the final game of the tournament Clement scored his first and only international points when he scored a try at St Helens against Ireland. In 1938 Clement was chosen to represent the British Isles in their 1938 tour of South Africa. This would be his last rugby campaign as a knee injury sustained in 1938 ended his playing career.

=== International matches played ===
Wales

- England 1937, 1938
- Ireland 1937, 1938
- Scotland 1937, 1938

== Military career ==
With the outbreak of the Second World War, Clement was commissioned into the 4th Battalion of the Welsh Regiment. He was injured in action twice, the first time was during the Battle for Caen, during the action for which he was awarded the Military Cross (MC). On 23 July 1944, Clement, now a war substantive captain and temporary major, was part of a raid on enemy positions around Le Bon Repos, near Caen. Clement was in command of one of two companies of the Welch Regiment involved in the operation, but as they advanced down a 900-yard slope toward the objective, he and his men came under heavy fire and Clement was injured in his leg. They suffered high levels of casualties, one of Clement's platoons was all but wiped out, with just four survivors. Casualties with this platoon included one of just two other officers who had started the attack with Clement. He managed to rally his troops and engaged the enemy in close-quarter combat, killing at least 30. When ordered to withdraw, Clement remained until his wounded had been recovered, and only then returned to the rendezvous, where he finally agreed to receive medical treatment. For his actions in this encounter he was awarded the Military Cross on 21 December 1944. In 1945, he was wounded in action in the Netherlands, again while in charge of his company of the 4th Battalion.

Clement remained in the Territorial Army after the war, holding the rank of captain and honorary major. He was awarded the Territorial Efficiency Decoration for his long service on 29 April 1955, and finally left the army when he reached the age limit for service, on 9 April 1965.

== Later life ==
After the end of the war, Clement returned to Wales, becoming an accountant in Llanishen. He returned to rugby in 1955 when he was chosen from 83 applicants to take over the roll of Secretary of the WRU after Eric Evans became terminally ill. One of his first duties was to solve the problem of a home international against Scotland in 1956, when the pitch at the Cardiff Arms Park was entirely frozen. Clements arranged for a team of men to keep braziers burning on the pitch overnight in an identical solution to the same problem that affected the same pitch in 1893.

He was secretary throughout the Second Golden Age of Welsh rugby and along with treasurer Ken Harris is remembered for overseeing the rebuilding of the old Cardiff Arms Park. On his retirement in 1981 he was appointed an Officer of the Order of the British Empire (OBE) for his services to rugby.

== Bibliography ==
- Billot, John (1972). All Blacks in Wales. Ferndale: Ron Jones Publications.
- Godwin, Terry (1984). The International Rugby Championship 1883–1983. London: Willows Books. ISBN 0-00-218060-X.
- Smith, David; Williams, Gareth (1980). Fields of Praise: The Official History of The Welsh Rugby Union. Cardiff: University of Wales Press. ISBN 0-7083-0766-3.
