= Cross Hands railway station =

Disused railway station in Cross Hands, Carmarthenshire

Cross Hands
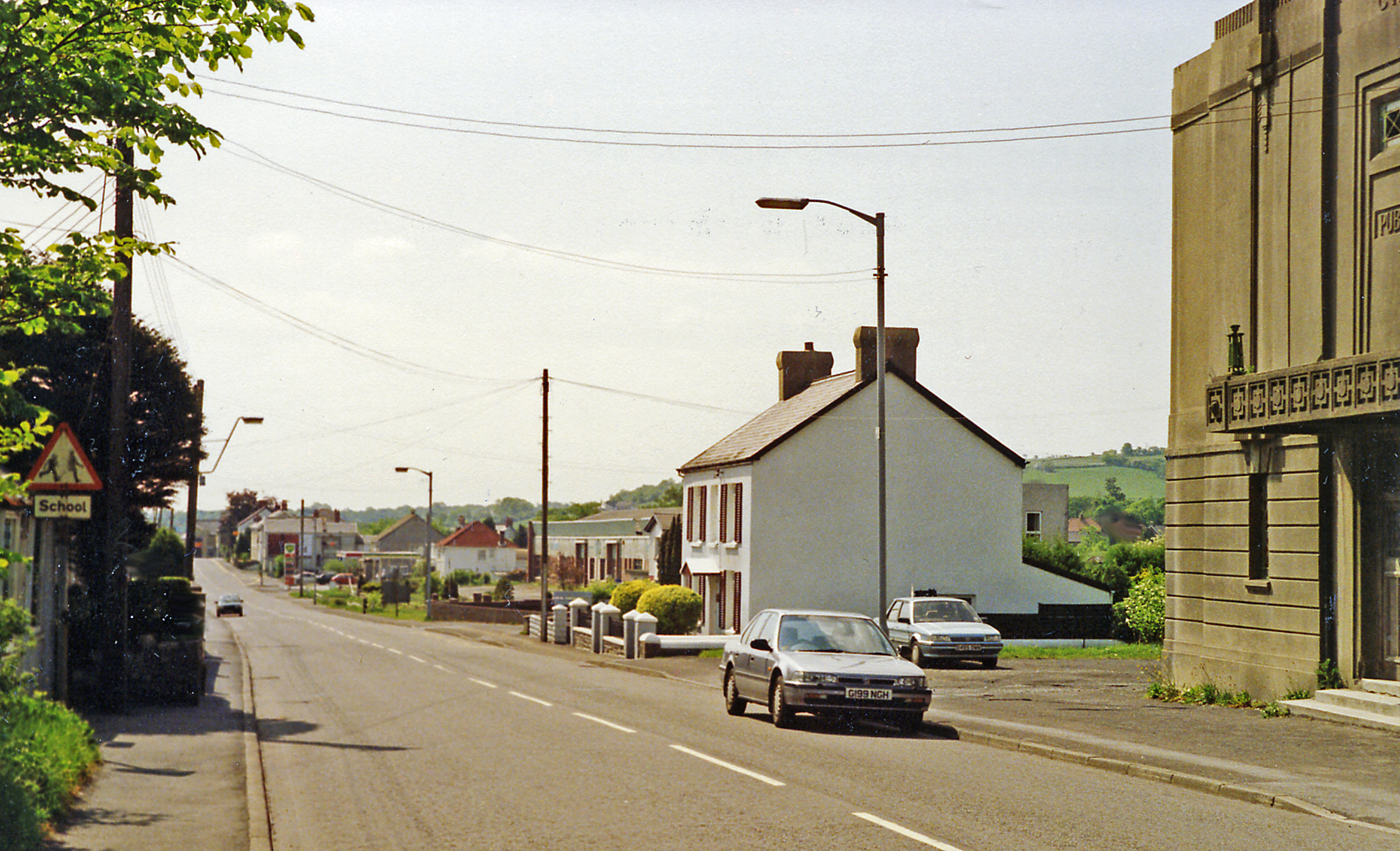
- Site of Cross Hands station

General information
- Location: Cross Hands, Carmarthenshire; Wales
- Coordinates: 51.79816°N 4.09008°W

Other information
- Status: Disused

History
- Original company: Llanelly and Mynydd Mawr Railway
- Pre-grouping: Great Western Railway
- Post-grouping: Great Western Railway

Key dates
- 1883: Opened to goods traffic
- 1880s: Opened to passengers
- 1929: Closed to passengers
- 1950: Line to Llanelli closes
- May 1962: Line to Ammanford closes
- May 1964: Closed to rail tours
Location

Cross Hands railway station was an unadvertised passenger and goods station terminus, that served the former mining village of Cross Hands in Carmarthenshire, Wales.

It was opened as a goods station on the Llanelly and Mynydd Mawr Railway from Llanelli and the freight only branch line to Llanelli Docks. There was also a connection for the Llanelly Railway's "Mountain Railway" towards Ammanford.

== History ==
The line from Ammanford (then known as "Tirydail") was constructed and open for mineral and goods traffic in 1841. It was not open to regular passenger services, although workmen trains were permitted to use the line to go home and to work.

The Llanelly and Mynydd Mawr Railway was opened in 1881, connecting Llanelli Docks to the Burry Port and Gwendraeth Valley Railway. The line was also opened to serving local collieries within the Gwendraeth valley.

A station was opened, albeit untimetabled in Cross Hands in 1887, but closed in 1929 to passengers. Workmens trains continued to use the station until the 1950s.

The station was also listed as "Cross Hands Goods Station" due to its importance to the local coal mines in the village.

== Operations ==
The station was originally operated by the Llanelly and Mynydd Mawr Railway before being operated by the Great Western Railway after the company had absorbed the Llanelly and Mynydd Mawr Railway.

== Closure ==
The station was closed to passengers in 1929, then to goods in 1959 following a sharp decline in coal mining within Wales and the local valleys.

The line between Cross Hands and Ammanford closed to all traffic in 1962 after closure of the coal mines along the branch line.

A rail tour visited the station in May 1964, as part of a West Wales Rail Tour. After this concluded, the line was lifted and the station demolished.

The line between Llanelli and Cynheidre Colliery remained active for freight trains until the closure of the colliery in 1989 and the full closure of the line.

== Present day ==
Today, the site of the station is now occupied by housing and road alignments, nothing remains of the station today.

== Routes ==
Preceding station	Historical railways	Following station
Tumble; Station open, line closed	Llanelly and Mynydd Mawr Railway; Great Western Railway	Terminus
