= Stan Williams (rugby union) =

Wales international rugby union player

- Full name: Stanley Williams
- Born: 4 November 1914 Llanelly, Wales
- Died: 21 November 1967 (aged 53) Llanelli, Wales

Rugby union career
- Position: Forward
International career
Years	Team	Apps	(Points)
1947–48	Wales	6	(0)

Stanley Williams (4 November 1914 – 21 November 1967) was a Welsh international rugby union player.

Born in Llanelly, Williams was a forward for his hometown club and began his career in the 1930s. His career was interrupted by World War II, during which he served in North Africa with the Welsh Guards. He gained his six Wales caps when rugby returned after the war, making his debut against England in 1947. Later that year, Williams was in the Llanelly pack which came close to beating the touring Wallabies, but missed the international against the same opponent. He last appeared for Wales in the 1948 Five Nations and went on to serve on the Llanelly committee.

== See also ==
- List of Wales national rugby union players
