= Ian Gallagher (cricketer) =

Australian cricketer (born 1950)

Personal information
- Born: 20 November 1950 (age 75); Greenslopes, Queensland, Australia
- Source: Cricinfo, 3 October 2020

Ian Gallagher (born 20 November 1950) is an Australian cricketer. He played in one first-class match for Queensland in 1982/83.

== See also ==
- List of Queensland first-class cricketers
