= Ian Gallagher (footballer) =

English footballer

Ian "Buster" Gallagher
Personal information
- Full name: Ian Gallagher
- Date of birth: 30 May 1978 (age 48)
- Place of birth: Hartlepool, England
- Position: Midfielder

Youth career
- Hartlepool United

Senior career*
Years	Team	Apps	(Gls)
1995–1997	Hartlepool United	1	(0)
- * Club domestic league appearances and goals

Ian "Buster" Gallagher (born 30 May 1978) is an English former footballer. Gallagher owns his own physiotherapy business called First Team Physiotherapy.

== Career ==
=== Playing career ===
In 1996, Gallagher made his first and only league appearance for his boyhood club Hartlepool in a Nationwide Division Three game against Plymouth Argyle.

Gallagher also made an appearance as a substitute in a Football League Trophy defeat against Burnley in December 1996.

=== Physiotherapy career ===
Following a knee injury, Gallagher was forced to retire which led to him training as a physio. Gallagher started working as a sports therapist at Hartlepool United following his retirement and became the club's Head Physio in 2012.

In April 2017, following the sacking of Hartlepool manager Dave Jones, Gallagher was one of three men – along with Stuart Parnaby and Billy Paynter – tasked with joint caretaker-managers Matthew Bates for the final two games of the season, which ended in a defeat and a victory, but ultimately relegation due to a late Newport County goal.

In June 2017, Gallagher was controversially sacked from Hartlepool by the club's chairperson Pam Duxbury ending his 25-year spell with the club. Duxbury said of his departure: "Times need to change at Hartlepool United FC to build for the future and unlock the potential that Hartlepool United has. I am fully aware of the comments which have been made on social media overnight – not just from our supporters but also from former players and managers at HUFC - and understand this may not be a popular decision."

Gallagher was appointed Head Physiotherapist at National League North club York City in August 2017.

Gallagher left York in August 2020 to re-take up his old position at Hartlepool United as the club's Head Physiotherapist. Buster left Pools in October 2021 citing personal and business reasons.

Buster opened his second physiotherapy clinic in December 2021.
