= Chris Matthews (Australian musician) =

Australian musician

- Born: Christopher John Matthews; Western Australia, Australia
- Origin: Perth, Western Australia, Australia
- Genres: Country, blues, rock 'n' roll
- Occupation: Musician
- Instruments: Vocals, guitars (acoustic, 12-string, lap stell), banjo
- Years active: 2001–present
- Website: chrismatthewsmusic.com

Christopher John Matthews is an Australian guitarist, singer and songwriter. He has released four albums and toured nationally. His style of guitar playing incorporates unorthodox finger picking techniques and alternate tunings; he sings with a baritone voice.

== Biography ==
Christopher John Matthews was born in Western Australia. At the age of 13, in Perth, Matthews started learning electric guitar and played heavy metal. He later recalled, "The first thing I learnt was the solo from Metallica's 'One'." From the age of 17 he was performing country music regularly for two-and-a-half years before touring the west coast to Darwin and then to Townsville. Early in 2004 he relocated to Melbourne, where he played at various local venues. By that time he was using an acoustic guitar or 12-string slide guitar with a stomp box.

By December 2010 he was based in Kununurra and was one of 20 finalists in the Tamworth Toyota Star Maker Quest for 2011. During the previous five years he had toured nationally five times. In April 2013 his five-track extended play, Five Songs for Six Strings (2012), had two tracks played regularly on national radio, "Getting Things Done" and "That's What They Call Learning".

By June 2015, Matthews had released four albums and toured nationally. His style of guitar playing incorporates unorthodox finger picking techniques and alternate tunings; he sings with a baritone voice.

== Discography ==
=== Albums ===
- Live in Australia (2007)
- It Goes to Eleven (1 August 2011)
- Capricornia (2014)
- Ten Tales from Ghost Gum (14 June 2015)

=== Extended plays ===
- Hippy Jazz (2001)
- Music for Spare Rooms (2002)
- Out of Two (2004)
- Five Songs for Six Strings (2012)
