= Llanelly Queen Victoria Road railway station =

Disused railway station in Llanelli, Carmarthenshire

Queen Victoria Road
- Site of Llanelly Queen Victoria Road railway station in 2014, now occupied by the Palms Centre.

General information
- Location: Llanelli, Carmarthenshire; Wales
- Coordinates: 51.67698°N 4.16932°W

Other information
- Status: Disused

History
- Original company: Llanelly and Mynydd Mawr Railway
- Pre-grouping: Great Western Railway
- Post-grouping: Great Western Railway

Key dates
- July 1881: Station opened to goods traffic
- 1966: Station closed to goods traffic
Location

Llanelly Queen Victoria Road railway station was a goods only station and depot serving the market town of Llanelli in Carmarthenshire, Wales. It was opened as a terminus goods depot on the Llanelly and Mynydd Mawr Railway from Sandy Bridge Junction and the branch line to Llanelli Docks.

== History ==
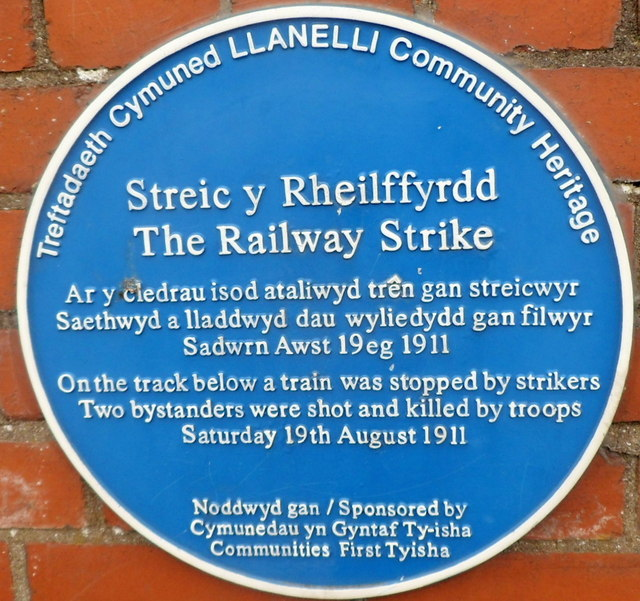
A blue plaque near Queen Victoria Road railway bridge, noting the Llanelli riots of 1911.

The Llanelly and Mynydd Mawr Railway was opened in 1881, connecting Llanelli Docks to the Burry Port and Gwendraeth Valley Railway. The line was also opened to serving local collieries within the Gwendraeth valley.

A goods station was opened in the town of Llanelli on Queen Victoria Road.

The station was near to the site of the Llanelli riots of 1911, which resulted in two bystanders being shot dead by the British Army.

== Cancelled passenger usage ==
Originally, the station was meant to be a passenger station but this was never formalized past proposals. This was likely due to the station being very close to the already active Llanelli railway station.

Despite not being used by passenger services, it does appear as a station in the "Hand book of the stations and sidings on the railways in the United Kingdom", published by Henry Oliver for Railway Clearing House in 1900.

== Operations ==
The goods station was originally operated by the Llanelly and Mynydd Mawr Railway before being operated by the Great Western Railway after the company had absorbed the Llanelly and Mynydd Mawr Railway.

== Closure ==
The station was closed to all goods traffic in 1966 following a sharp decline in coal mining within Wales and the local valleys.

== Present day ==
Today, the site of the station is now occupied by the Palms Centre and Carers Trust Crossroads West Wales including an adjoining car park. With some houses built on the site of the old sidings.
