= Stuart Gallacher =

Wales dual-code rugby international footballer

Personal information
- Full name: Ian Stuart Gallacher
- Born: 22 May 1946; Llanelli, Wales
- Died: 19 October 2014 (aged 68)

Playing information

Rugby union
- Position: Lock
Club
Years	Team	Pld	T	G	FG	P
	Felinfoel RFC
	Llanelli RFC
	Total	0	0	0	0	0
Representative
Years	Team	Pld	T	G	FG	P
1970	Wales	1	0	0	0	0
1970	Barbarians

Rugby league
- Position: Second-row
Club
Years	Team	Pld	T	G	FG	P
1970–74	Bradford Northern	130	30	0	0	90
1975	Keighley
	Total	130	30	0	0	90
Representative
Years	Team	Pld	T	G	FG	P
1974	Other Nationalities	3	0	0	0	0
1975	Wales	4	0	0	0	0

Ian Stuart Gallacher (22 May 1946 – 19 October 2014) was a Welsh dual-code international rugby union, and professional rugby league footballer who played in the 1960s and 1970s.

== Rugby union playing career ==
Born in Llanelli, Gallacher played for Felinfoel RFC and Llanelli RFC, as a lock. He joined Llanelli RFC in 1965 and played almost 200 games for the club. At Llanelli RFC he won his only international cap for Wales, against France on 4 April 1970. He played at invitational level for Barbarian F.C.

== Rugby league playing career ==
In 1970, he joined Bradford Northern rugby league club, moving to Keighley in January 1975. He played as a second-row. He won caps for Wales (RL) while at Keighley in 1975 against France and England, and in the 1975 Rugby League World Cup against New Zealand, and France.

== Rugby union executive ==
He acted as chief executive of Llanelli RFC and Scarlets from 1996, before being appointed as chief executive of Regional Rugby Wales (RRW) in 2009. He stood down from the post in June 2014 because of poor health. He was also a member of the board of the European Rugby Cup.
