= Chris Matthews (rugby union) =

Welsh rugby union player

- Full name: Christopher Mansel Matthews
- Born: 16 August 1911 Newton Nottage, Wales
- Died: 5 December 1965 (aged 54) Cardiff, Wales

Rugby union career
- Position: Wing
International career
Years	Team	Apps	(Points)
1939	Wales	1	(0)

Christopher Mansel Matthews (16 August 1911 — 5 December 1965) was a Welsh international rugby union player.

Born in Newton Nottage, Matthews was the son of former Bridgend captain Tommie Matthews and attended Queen's College in Taunton, Somerset, where he learned his rugby.

Matthews was a prolific try-scoring wing three-quarter for Bridgend and was capped once for Wales, featuring on the right wing in their win over Ireland at Belfast in the 1939 Home Nations.

== See also ==
- List of Wales national rugby union players
