= River Lliedi =

River in Carmarthenshire, Wales

Coordinates: 51.72328°N 4.16399°W

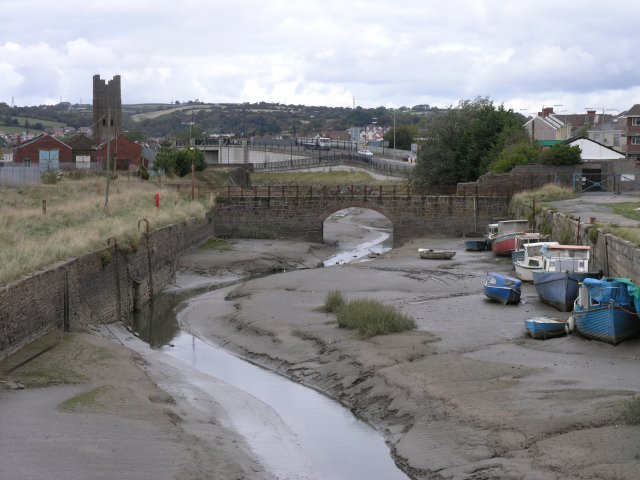
Tidal reach of the Lliedi in Llanelli

The River Lliedi (Welsh: Afon Lliedi) has its source near Mynydd Sylen Llanelli and Llannon in Carmarthenshire, Wales. The river fills the Cwm-Lliedi Reservoirs and meets the sea at the Loughor Estuary (Welsh-Moryd Llwchwr) at the former Carmarthenshire Dock (Porth Sir Gaerfyrddin), Llanelli.

The river's tidal course near Llanelli has been altered several times over the last 200 years to build docks to serve the large tinplate and coal mining industries of the town. Before the North Dock (Porth y Gogledd) was built it flowed through Pownd yr Hen Gastell at the bottom of Old Castle Road and out to the north-west of Llanelli Beach.
