= Cynheidre Colliery =

Welsh coal mine active 1954-1989

Coordinates: 51.7505°N 4.1840°W

Cynheidre Colliery was a coal mine located in the Gwendraeth valley, in Carmarthenshire, South Wales. Opened in 1954, it closed in 1989.

Cynheidre was developed by the National Coal Board as one of the West Wales "super pits" alongside Abernant Colliery in the River Amman valley, a post-World War II investment intended to keep economic coal mining a viable industry in the area. Created to exploit 196 square miles (510 km^{2}) of deep lying anthracite seams, it was envisaged to eventually encompass the working of the drift mines at the Great Mountain Colliery and Pentremawr.

Between 1954 and 1956, shafts No.1 (upcast 798 yards (730 m)) and No.2 (downcast 786 yards (719 m)) were sunk 2 miles (3.2 km) south of Pentremawr, to give economic access to the deeper lying extents of the anthracite seams which couldn't be worked economically by slant mining.

In 1955, shaft No.3 was created. Originally sunk for ventilating Glynhebog drift mine, it was extended to a depth of 760 yards (690 m) to meet the workings at Cynheidre, providing an upcast. By 1960, the colliery employed 650 men producing 30,757 tons of coal.

In 1962, shaft No.4 downcast was created next to shaft No.3, to a depth of 700 yards (640 m). After these developments, Pentremawr was integrated under Cynheidre in 1973, connected both underground as well as overground by the Llanelly and Mynydd Mawr Railway.

From both the structure of local geology and knowledge from workings at Pentremawr, it was known that the coal field suffered from methane gas intrusion. On 6 April 1971 six miners lost their lives in an explosion of methane gas and fine coal dust. In 1972, Cynheidre produced 472,000 tons of coal employing 1,430 men.

Cynheidre was to be the site of the proposed Carway Fawr Drift Mine. Development work started in 1986, but along with the residual Cynheidre underground workings, closed in January 1989 while employing 1,043 men.

In 2006, the site was proposed as the location of a human waste-to-compost plant, but was turned down on planning permission. In 2009 Gwendraeth Valley Recycling Ltd established a Waste Transfer Station / Recycling Yard at the site of the former Carway Fawr winding shed/ control room and yard, within Cynheidre Colliery to the North of shafts 1 and 2.
