= Llanelly and Mynydd Mawr Railway =

Early Welsh railway line

The Llanelly and Mynydd Mawr Railway was authorised in 1875. It made use of part of the long defunct Carmarthenshire Railway or Tramroad of 1801. The older line began running trains in 1803, and was a plateway of about 4 ft (1,219 mm) gauge, with horse traction, for the purpose of bringing minerals from the Mynydd Mawr to the sea for onward shipment at Llanelly Docks.

The Llanelly and Mynydd Mawr line opened in 1881, worked by the contractor, John Waddell, who had built the line and taken a majority of the shares. The fortunes of the company were closely bound with those of the mineral industries, which fluctuated considerably. The company considered operating a public passenger service but never did so, although workmen's trains were operated for some years. The decline of coal mining in the area seemed to be reversed when the huge new Cynheidre Pit was established in the 1960s, but the railway capacity enhancements to deal with the expected upsurge in traffic proved to be unnecessary. The line closed completely in 1989.

== Early waggonways ==
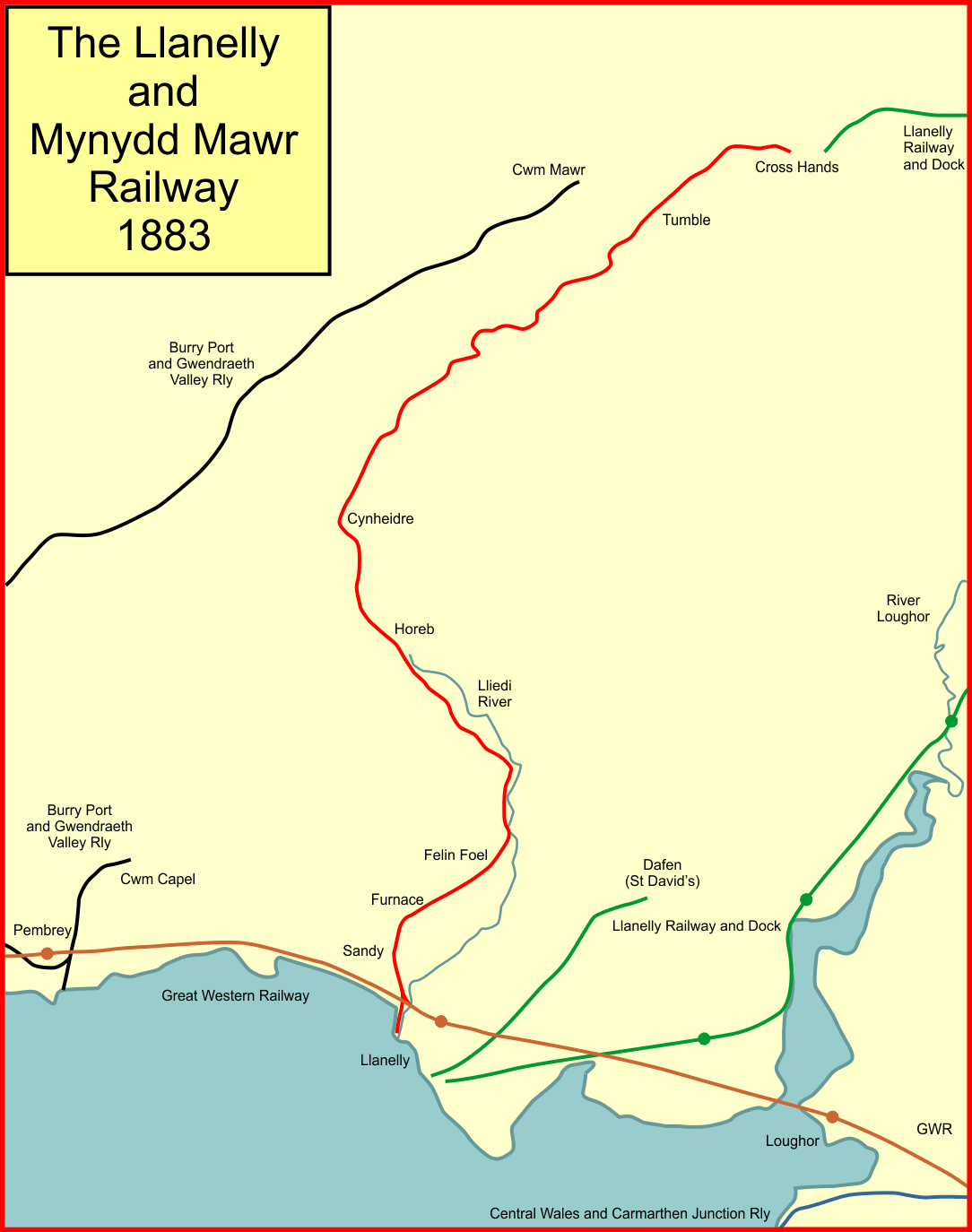
The Llanelly and Mynydd Mawr Railway

In the 1760s the area around Llanelly had considerable colliery activity, and there were five short canals from pits to the sea shore; the heavy mineral was brought to shipping for onward transport, at a time when there were no usable roads or railways.

In 1769 Kymer's Canal was opened between pits in the Gwendraeth Valley and the coast; there were a number of basic wooden tramways in connection with it, covering the short distance between the mouth of the pits and the nearby canal.

At the time coal was loaded into ships at Llanelly by beaching them on the mudflats, or using lighters to ferry coal out to larger vessels anchored off-shore. Wharves were an obvious solution, and one of the first was built in 1795 to serve a canal from pits owned by William Roderick, Thomas Bowen and Margaret Griffiths. This was later developed as the Pemberton's Dock.

In March 1797 Alexander Raby arranged a lease with Dame Mary Mansell, owner of the Stradey Estate, entitling him to work coal measures on the estate. Raby undertook to mine 5,000 tons of coal annually and there were penalties if he failed to do so (or to pay the corresponding royalty). In January 1798 he concluded further leases on the property, and one of these authorised him to construct his own tramroad to connect his coal and ironworks with a new shipping place on the mudflats at Llanelly. Raby's 'new iron way' was built on the alignment of an earlier waggonway which had linked the Caemain pit with what was then the beach at Sandy.

Alexander Raby's dock was a short distance to the north-west of Pemberton's Dock, and it later became known as the Carmarthenshire Dock. This dock and the tramroad serving it came into use by 1799. The most notable feature of the tramroad was an iron bridge over the River Lliedi at Sandy, which is believed to have been the world's third iron railway bridge.

== The Carmarthenshire Railway or Tramroad ==
A canal was still under consideration to connect the collieries in the hills with the harbour at Llanelly, but it was realised that the hilly terrain was difficult for canals, and from 1800 Raby planned a tramroad instead. In 1801 he promoted the Carmarthenshire Railway or Tramroad; (Note: The ambiguity "Railway or Tramroad" is used repeatedly by Price, and also by Carter.) it was authorised by the Carmarthenshire Railway or Tramroad Company Act 1802 (42 Geo. 3. c. lxxx) on 3 June 1802 and was the third to do so after the Lake Lock Rail Road and the Surrey Iron Railway. Capital was £25,000 and it was to use the trackbed of a former waggonway. It was also to construct a harbour at the mouth of the River Lliedi.

The act empowered the company to acquire Raby's dock and tramroad system, and provided for the extension of the line to Castell-y-Garreg, about 3 1/2 miles (5.6 km) west of Llandybie. The tramroad was a plateway, using L-shaped plates so that ordinary wagon wheels could run on it; the plates were supported on stone blocks. Although Raby had been the prime mover in consideration of tramways at Llanelly, the new Company was a joint-stock company, and there were several other shareholders. The engineer was James Barnes.

The gauge seems to have been 4 ft (1,219 mm): the engineer's report of September 1801 stated his intention that the line should be built with "rails laid 4 Feet asunder". However, Price records the recollection of an unnamed "old retainer" on the estate: he wrote

"The Mynydd Mawr Railway was made 2 in. broder [broader] as far as Tyishaf Farm for convenience of coals from the Old Ship [the Old Slip, near Furnace]... The way we manage was Take off and put on washers on the axeltry [axletree] to width of 2 inches."

Price speculates that several earlier tramroads in the area were built to the gauge of 4 ft 2 in (1,270 mm), but that the Carmarthenshire Railway or Tramroad was built to match the gauge of Raby's line, rather than the others.

The first section of line was opened for traffic from the ironworks at Cwmddyche to the water's edge at Llanelly in May 1803, a distance of 1 1/2 miles (2.4 km). This is claimed to be the first publicly authorised railway in use in Britain, because the Surrey Iron Railway, although authorised earlier, was not ready for traffic until July 1803. In fact by then the first 5 miles (8.0 km) of the Carmarthenshire Railway or Tramroad, together with certain branches, were already in use. Earthworks were considerable for a tramroad, and the ruling gradient was limited to 1 in 38.

By November 1803 the line was open as far as Brindini (Cynheidre), at an altitude of 500 feet (152.4 m) above sea level. A considerable embankment was necessary on Mynydd Mawr itself, which delayed opening there until November 1804 and the line was completed to Gorslas (Cross Hands) in 1805. During the construction process near Cross Hands several outcrops of anthracite coal were discovered.

The line flourished, and in November 1805 plans were considered for further improvements to the dock at Llanelly. There were numerous branch connections to industrial premises mostly under Raby's control, and the line was to be doubled "from the turnout place at Lime Kiln [Cwmddyche] to the turnout place at Old Castle." There was opposition to this from some of the London shareholders and it is not certain whether the doubling work was actually carried out.

There were financial difficulties in the company: at a shareholders' meeting on 7 November 1805 there was a clear body of opinion that Raby had diverted the company's resources to his own benefit. On 15 August 1806 a special general meeting was held, at which a report was presented outlining unauthorised branches built by Raby, and the fact that his own wagons had used the line without paying the toll. The financial criticism of Raby gathered pace and in June 1807 he was obliged to sell most of his industrial property to pay debts. Debt had been incurred on the railway too, and by November 1809 the commercial activity on the line was at a very low level. Raby continued his activities locally, although increasingly under the financial patronage of others, in effect a salaried manager. He left the area as a result of worsening finances in 1826.

Technical progress in railways had developed edge rails, which were capable of carrying heavier wheel loads, and it is likely that an edge railway had been built alongside the lower part of the Carmarthenshire alignment before 1832, by which time the now-outmoded Carmarthenshire Tramroad had fallen into disuse north of Felin Foel.

Carter records that the Carmarthenshire raised further subscriptions in 1834 for improvement works, and that the company was re-incorporated in 1864–1865. (Note: It is difficult to see what the purpose of the re-incorporation was; Awdry states that the Company went into voluntary liquidation in 1844. Denman and also Barrie quote 1844, which is more convincing.)

== The Kidwelly and Llanelly Canal Company ==
Thomas Kymer had made a 3 1/2-mile (5.6 km) canal from his pits at Pwllyllygoed to a harbour at Kidwelly about 1769. In 1811 it was proposed to extend the canal to Pontyberem and also to Llanelly, and the Kidwelly and Llanelly Canal Company was formed to do so; in 1812 it obtained an authorising act of Parliament, the Kidwelly and Llanelly Canal and Tramroad Company Act 1812 (52 Geo. 3. c. clxxiii), and the extensions were permitted to be canals or tramroads, to Cwm-y-Glo near Cwmmawr and to a basin at Llanelly. The canals were constructed and in operation, but neither the tramroad nor the connection to Llanelly were made until 1837, but the new facility at Kidwelly was an obvious competitive threat to the Llanelly interest.

In 1833 the K&LCC considered what extensions could be made, and a report recommended extending the canal to Cwmmawr, although that would involve three inclined planes. A "branch railroad" would be built above that point. In fact that may not have been constructed, but early in June 1837 the company completed its tramway from Pembrey to Llanelly.

== The Llanelly Railway ==
In 1835 the Llanelly Railway obtained powers to build from St David's Pit, above Dafen, to connect with the Carmarthenshire Railway or Tramroad at Felin Foel. The Llanelly Railway was to be an edge railway, and it seems to have been assumed that the Carmarthenshire line would be converted to that system; however this line was never built. From September 1839 anthracite coal from Mynydd Mawr was brought to Llanelly by the Llanelly Railway, by-passing the Carmarthenshire line, taking an easterly sweep through the present-day Ammanford).

== Llanelly Harbour Commissioners ==
The state of Llanelly Harbour had long given cause for concern, and by the Burry, Loughor and Lliedi Rivers Navigation Act 1843 (6 & 7 Vict. c. lxxxviii) the Llanelly Harbour Commissioners were authorised to raise money and improve the harbour, also acquiring the Carmarthenshire Dock from the Carmarthenshire Railway or Tramroad Company and altering the course of the River Lliedi to improve scour. By now the majority of the Carmarthenshire Railway or Tramroad route was disused, but the Carmarthenshire Railway or Tramroad Company remained in existence.

== South Wales Railway ==
The Great Western Railway supported a nominally independent South Wales Railway that was to connect Gloucester (and thence London over the GWR) with Fishguard, forming a route to Ireland by ferry and (it was hoped) in due course North America. This railway opened through Llanelly (from Swansea to Carmarthen) on 11 October 1852, although the western terminus was altered. The South Wales Railway was built on the broad gauge, for compatibility with the Great Western Railway. In 1858 the Llanelly Harbour Commissioners obtained Parliamentary authority to build a broad gauge branch line from the SWR to the western harbour breakwater, closely following the Carmarthenshire alignment.

The South Wales Railway had been conceived as a partner with the Great Western Railway, but the financial aspect of the relationship was somewhat shaky. However, in 1862 the Great Western Railway absorbed the South Wales Railway. The broad gauge was increasingly a liability in South Wales, where much of the activity of extracting coal took place in areas served by local, narrow gauge lines, and the transshipment to broad gauge wagons was a massive deterrent. The Great Western Railway determined to convert the gauge of its lines in South Wales to what had become "standard" gauge, and did so in May 1872.

== The Llanelly and Mynydd Mawr Railway authorised ==
Llanelly and Mynydd Mawr Railway Act 1875
- Act of Parliament
- Parliament of the United Kingdom
- Long title: An Act for authorising the construction of a Railway from Llanelly to Mynydd Mawr, in the county of Carmarthen; for conferring powers on the Carmarthenshire Railway or Tramroad Company; and for other purposes.
- Citation: 38 & 39 Vict. c. clxiv

Dates
- Royal assent: 19 July 1875

Llanelly and Mynydd Mawr Railway Act 1880
- Act of Parliament
- Parliament of the United Kingdom
- Long title: An Act for extending the time for the completion of the Llanelly and Mynydd Mawr Railway; and for other purposes.
- Citation: 43 & 44 Vict. c. xiii

Dates
- Royal assent: 29 June 1880

Text of statute as originally enacted

In 1872 ideas were revived of building a standard gauge line from Llanelly to Mynydd Mawr, giving improved access to the collieries there. Enthusiasm was considerable and the Llanelly and Mynydd Mawr Railway was authorised by an act of Parliament, the Llanelly and Mynydd Mawr Railway Act 1875 (38 & 39 Vict. c. clxiv), on 19 July 1875; share capital was £60,000. The new line was to be 13 miles (21 km) in length, and to cross the South Wales Railway main line by a bridge. The alignment further on was generally close to the old Carmarthenshire route, but not exactly following it. The Carmarthenshire property was to be purchased for £1,400.

Raising capital proved to be exceedingly difficult, and negotiations took place with various contractors who, the Directors hoped, might be willing to finance the construction themselves by taking shares instead of cash payment. This proved fruitless and after four years, on 31 October 1879, the Shareholders accepted a recommendation to abandon the scheme for the railway.

There was evidently confusion at this point about the intended actions, for on 12 November 1879 a letter was discussed by the Board; the letter was from the company's engineers, Kinipple and Ross, and recommended approaching Parliament for a time extension for the construction.

"A resolution to abandon the Llanelly and Mynydd-Mawr Railway scheme, which was come to in October last, was rescinded by a meeting of shareholders on Wednesday, and it was further agreed to apply to Parliament for an extension of the time given for carrying out the undertaking."

The Dynant colliery, located near the intended line was promising increasing flows of coal on it, and a brickworks was being finalised. Furthermore, John Waddell, a Scottish contractor, indicated that he would be prepared to construct the line for £25,000 in cash and £35,000 in shares. There was further negotiation about the value of Waddell's shareholding, but he started work on 26 April 1880 and the time extension Act was obtained in June 1880.

Influenced by the old Carmarthenshire Railway alignment, the new line was subject to numerous very sharp curves. A short branch to Llanelly town was authorised in 1881 by a Board of Trade certificate, but the reality of paying for it when the company's financial resources were so stretched, resulted in its abandonment. (Note: There had long been a goods siding at Queen Victoria Street, immediately alongside the spur from the GWR line.)

In January 1881 an arrangement was made with the contractor John Waddell for him to work the line for five years, for 70% of gross receipts in year 1, then 60%, then 50% in subsequent years, subject to his guaranteeing the debenture payments.

On 6 June 1881 two excursion trains were run up the railway; this was before the formal approval of the Board of Trade inspector had been given, and was contrived by the participants, "1,000 souls", paying for refreshments and getting the travelling free of charge. (Note: Denman shows this date as the formal opening of the line.) The South Wales Daily News understood that the line opened on 20 December 1881: "Opening of the Llanelly Mynydd-Mawr Railway: On Tuesday last the Llanelly Mynydd-mawr Railway was formally opened, and in the evening a grand banquet was given, at which the principal gentlemen of Llanelly were present."

The line was considered formally to be opened from 1 January 1883 although it is evident that Waddell had been carrying goods and mineral traffic on his own account for several months prior to that date. (Note: Barrie suggests from July 1881 for local goods.) Two steam locomotives were in use from the beginning, an 0-4-0 and an 0-6-0 from Andrew Barclay. The line conveyed goods and minerals only; there were depots at Felin Foel, Horeb, Cynheidre, Cwm Blawd, Tumble and Cross Hands. A time interval system of operation was used.

The finances of the company were extremely shaky; the anthracite trade had practically collapsed. Nonetheless Waddell, now the majority shareholder in the line, acquired mineral leases around Tumble. He founded the Great Mountain Anthracite Collieries Company, and work began on sinking a new mine. It opened in 1887, and by 1892 it employed 600 men and had an output of about 400 tons per day. Traffic on the railway increased again, and train miles doubled from 1884 to 1887.

John Waddell died in 1888 and was succeeded in his contracting company by his son George. Trade improved considerably at this time and the finances of the Company further improved correspondingly.

The Light Railways Act 1896 was passed with a view to encouraging low-cost railway development, and as well as new lines it could be used to convert existing mineral lines to passenger operation. In 1900 the L&MMR considered this possibility, but the Board of Trade, whose sanction for the conversion would be required, stated that the numerous sharp curves and lack of signalling made the scheme unsuitable. The L&MMR consulted Saxby and Farmer about the installation of signalling, but the cost exceeded the resources of the company. Another enquiry four years later produced much the same result.

== Llanelly Harbour ==
The harbour at Llanelly was prone to silting, and as the output of the Great Mountain Colliery increased in the 1890s this became a serious constraint, much output being diverted to Swansea. In 1892 and again in 1895 the reclaimed spit of land leading to the light tower was breached by the sea, further reducing the utility of the rail access to the harbour facilities. (Note: Price records that the L&MMR complained in vain to the Harbour Commissioners about this loss; Cooke shows the final part of the line as the property of the Harbour Commissioners.) In 1896 the Harbour Commissioners obtained an act of Parliament giving powers to extend and improve the harbour by the construction of a North Dock. The shipping entrance to the dock was to be at the point where the L&MMR passed along the waterfront. Work did not start promptly, and in fact it was not until 1899 that it started. The work immediately interfered with the L&MMR operation, the track being undermined at the site of construction. Peaceful negotiation having failed, the L&MMR secured wagons to their track at the point of construction, but the Harbour Commissioners' contractor struck off the securing chain and removed the obstruction. The matter was eventually resolved in the High Court, where the finding went in favour of the L&MMR.

Consequently, the Harbour Commissioners having expended much of the capital cost of the works on the construction of the dock, they were now unable to compete the required shipping access to it. They had to go to Parliament for a further authorising act of Parliament, which they obtained in 1901. However their attitude to the L&MMR continued to be hostile and obstructive. A swing bridge was provided crossing the dock entrance for L&MMR trains, and the North Dock opened in December 1903.

In 1904 the Harbour Commission was restyled the Llanelly Harbour Trust. The L&MMR stated that the harbour works had involved the extensive use of their railway in the immediate vicinity and that no payment had been received for the activity; when the L&MMR used the new harbour works, and later the nearby Kings Dock, the dues for that usage were retained as a contra charge, and the claimed debt on either side mounted and eventually rose to tens of thousands of pounds the issue only being resolved by negotiation in June 1922.

== The twentieth century ==
In 1911 the question of passenger operation on the line was revived, stimulated by the opening of a street-running passenger tramway in Llanelly. Now it was considered feasible, and indeed the L&MMR had been running workmen's trains north of Sandy for some time. However once again nothing was done. In 1920 a GWR steam railmotor, no 75, was run in clearance trials over the line, but again this led to no progress. The workmen's trains continued as before.

The Railways Act 1922 required that the main line railways of Great Britain should be "grouped" into four larger units; the L&MMR was to absorbed by the Great Western Railway. In its final year of independence in 1922 the L&MMR paid a dividend of 6% on its ordinary share capital of £59,300. On 1 January 1923 the Great Western Railway took over and the L&MMR ceased to operate.

The local production of anthracite fell in the following years, reducing the commercial activity on the line. Moreover, the size of shipping commonly used increased considerably over this period, and the limitations of sea access to Llanelly docks also reduced the activity there.

In 1948 the Great Western Railway was nationalised, in common with the other public railways of Great Britain, and the line was now owned by British Railways.

By 1950 the L&MMR line crossing the GWR main line was out of use, as sea trade had vanished; onward conveyance of local minerals was now by rail alone.

From 1950 active planning was taking place for a massive expansion of the Cynheidre Colliery, and the considerable extra traffic on the line was to demand improvements in capacity. These improvements took the form of realignments to eliminate the worst of the sharp curves; provision of a passing loop at Magpie Grove; and installation of signalling. At Horeb the track was realigned over a distance of 1/2 mile (0.80 km). The new signalling was provided as far as Cynheidre, with signal boxes at Sandy, Magpie Grove and Cynheidre; these were commissioned in July 1962. These developments enabled the more powerful 42XX class 2-8-0 tank locomotives to be used on Cynheidre trains, in place of multiple pannier tanks. 56XX 0-6-2 tank engines were also tried.

The new colliery did not prove to be the huge development that had been planned, and traffic was seldom heavy enough to justify the improvements which had been carried out. Magpie Grove signal box is believed to have been closed by 1965, and those at Sandy and Cynheidre were closed from 25 February 1968. The railway then reverted one-engine-in-steam operation. Steam locomotives ceased to operate on the line from 1 November 1965.

== Closure ==
From 17 October 1966 the line above Tumble was closed, following the steep decline of mineral extraction in the upper part of the route.

Cynheidre colliery too declined steeply in output and the last shift was worked on 24 March 1989, and the line became dormant. The final train was an enthusiasts' special passenger train on 14 October 1989.

== Swiss Valley Cycle Route ==
A local preservation group hoped to purchase the closed line but were unable to raise the cash, and the line was sold to the local authorities; it was converted into the Swiss Valley Cycle Route, part of National Cycle Route 47.

== Llanelli and Mynydd Mawr Railway Company Limited ==
A new company was incorporated on 15 April 1999, as a company limited by guarantee; it is named The Llanelli and Mynydd Mawr Railway Company Ltd, therefore reviving the name of the former operator albeit with the later Llanelli spelling. The primary objective of the company is to reinstate a railway on the historic line. A heritage centre will also interpret the history of coal mining in the area and in particular the industry which the railway served.

The centre opened to the public for the first time on Sunday 3 September 2017. The event was formally opened by Nia Griffith MP who took the first ride over a short section of the running line to the north. The public were also able to have rides in the railway's BR brakevan, hauled by Sentinel 0-4-0DH no. 10222. Refreshments were also available in the railway's static buffet car and a temporary heritage display was publicly viewable throughout the day.

The next goal for the railway is to improve on-site facilities and extend the running line to the north.

== Locomotives ==
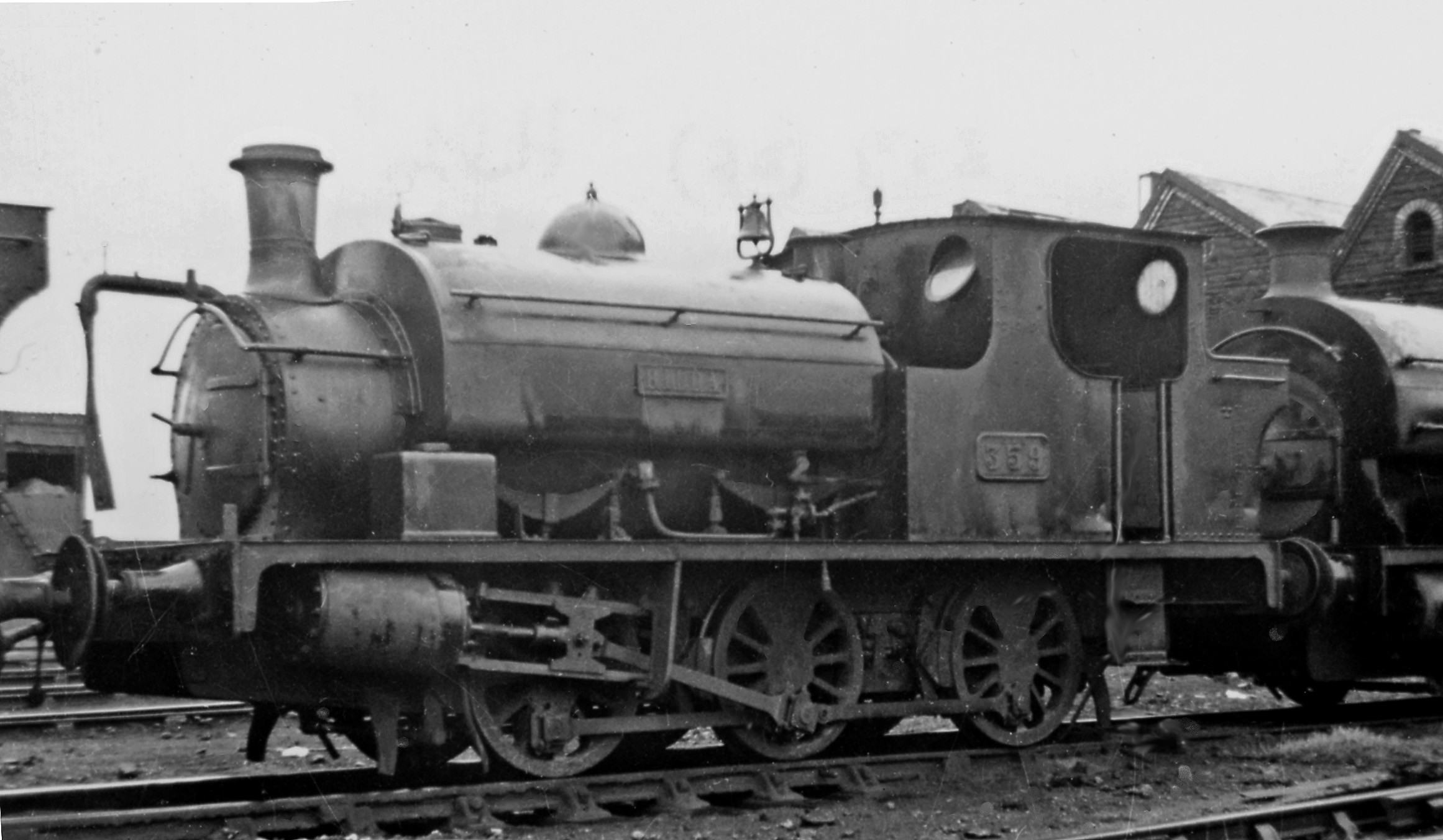
0-6-0 saddle-tank No. 359 'Hilda' at Danygraig Locomotive Depot 1946

In the early years John Waddell and Company operated the line using its own steam locomotives.

Builder	Works no.	Built	Wheels	Name	GWR no.	Notes
AB	219	1880	0-4-0ST	-	-	Sold 1885
AB	221	1880	0-6-0ST	John Waddell	-	Sold 1908
FW	279	1885	0-6-0ST	Seymour Clarke	969	Withdrawn July 1925
AB	199	1879	0-6-0ST	No. 104 Inveravon	-	To LMMR 1887; Boiler exploded 1889
P	464	1888	0-6-0ST	Jeannie Waddell	-	To Great Mountain; Colliery 1913
P	475	1889	0-6-0ST	-	-	Sold 1896
BH	884	1889	0-4-0ST	Burntisland	-	Sold by 1913
AE	1448	1902	0-6-0T	Great Mountain	944	Withdrawn November 1928
AB	1111	1907	0-6-0T	George Waddell	312	Withdrawn December 1934
AB	1157	1908	0-6-0ST	E.J. Robertson Grant	-	Sold 1919
HC	930	1911	0-6-0T	Ravelston	803	To British Railways 1948; Withdrawn March 1951
HC	912	1911	0-6-0ST	John Waddell	-	To Great Mountain; Colliery c. 1919
HC	977	1912	0-6-0T	Merkland	937	Withdrawn June 1923
HC	1032	1913	0-6-0T	Tarndune	339	Withdrawn August 1943
HC	1214	1917	0-6-0ST	Hilda	359	To British Railways 1948; Withdrawn July 1954
MW	1982	1920	0-6-0T	Victory	704	Withdrawn December 1943

Following absorption by the Great Western Railway, pannier tanks were in common use on the line. These continued under British Railways until phasing out of steam in the 1960s. In 1965 0-6-0 PT 1607 of Llanelli shed 87F was purchased by the National Coal Board and worked at Cynheidre Colliery until 1969 when it was condemned with a cracked frame, and was subsequently scrapped on site. In the later years of the line Class 37 diesel locomotives were the main form of traction, supplemented by Class 08 diesel shunting locos until the closure of the Cynheidre North section.

== Topography ==
The Llanelly and Mynydd Mawr Railway ran from Llanelli Harbour where certain sidings belonged to the Harbour Commissioners (adopted from the Carmarthenshire Railway when the Harbour was transferred to them); it crossed the entrance to the North Dock when that was constructed. Continuing north it crossed the former South Wales Railway (later Great Western Railway main line) by a bridge. An east to north connection was made from the GWR main line towards Sandy, and there was a small goods depot at this point, known at different times as Victoria Road, Queen Victoria Road, and Albert Road depot. It had been considered for the Llanelli passenger station when passenger operation was planned, but this never took place. Continuing northwards the line passed Sandy Junction, where the Kidwelly and Llanelly Canal and Railway joined from the west. The line now continued to Furnace, paralleling the earlier Stradey Estate Waggonway at first. Now climbing continuously, the line ran past Felinfoel and Magpie Grove to Horeb, where there was an important brickworks. In this section several local realignments took place in connection with the development for Cynheidre Colliery in the 1960s.

After Horeb Cynheidre was reached, followed by Cwmblawd, Dynant, Tumble and Cross Hands. Numerous realignments of the original Carmarthenshire Railway route took place when the Llanelly and Mynydd Mawr Railway was constructed.

The original Carmarthenshire Railway ran to iron workings at Gorslas, a short distance beyond Cross Hands. John Waddell made a short extension to Gors-Goch colliery there. The Mountain branch of the Llanelly Railway and Dock also approached to Gors-Goch from the east, and when the Llanelly and Mynydd Mawr Railway was built, it ran to the same termination sidings at that point. The extremity of the Mountain Branch was disused by 1905.

The gradients were naturally falling from Cynheidre to Sandy, with a ruling gradient of 1 in 48 over a distance of 6 miles (9.7 km). Above Cynheidre the gradients were undulating, generally against the load, but without lengthy steep gradients. The same applies between Sandy and the Harbour at Llanelly.

The 1927 working timetable (reproduced in Price) shows the workmen's trains calling at Sandy (terminus), Furnace, Felinfoel, Horeb, Cwmblawd, Tumble, S&R Colliery, and Cross Hands. This operation started in 1887 and finished about 1928. Nine coaches were acquired from the Metropolitan Railway in 1913 for working the service.

== See also ==
- The Great Western Railway in West Wales
