= River Gwendraeth =

River in South Wales

Coordinates: 51.73681°N 4.31814°W

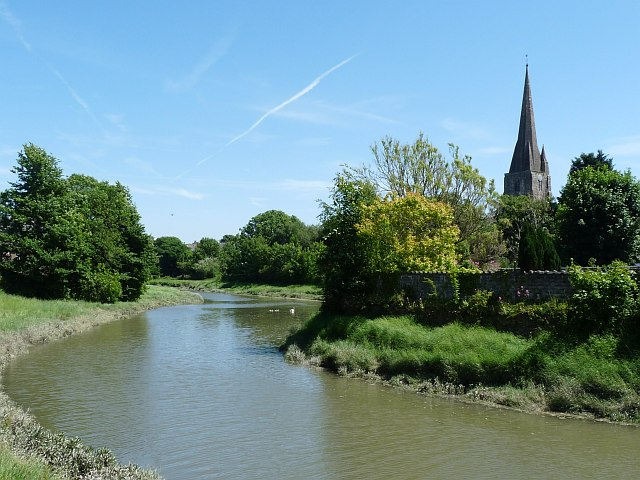
Gwendraeth Fach, near Kidwelly

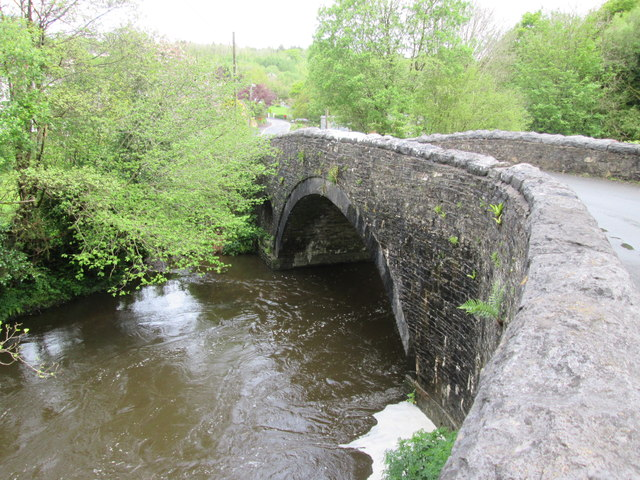
Gwendraeth Fawr, near Pont Henri

The River Gwendraeth (Welsh: Afon Gwendraeth) is a river in Carmarthenshire in West Wales.

It has two almost equal branches that have their confluence in their joint estuary at Carmarthen Bay. The Gwendraeth Fawr ('large Gwendraeth' in English) is surprisingly the smaller and has its source in a series of springs to the north of Cross Hands, the most northerly of which rises to the north of Gorslas in the Llyn Llech Owain Country Park, just above the 585-foot (180 m) contour. Below Cross Hands, it skirts the northern edge of Mynydd Mawr Woodland Park, and flows to the south of Drefach. It crosses the 160-foot (50 m) contour to pass through Pontyberem, Pont Henri and Pontyates, by which time it is less than 33 feet (10 m) above sea level. Finally, it passes to the south of Kidwelly, to enter the estuary.

The Gwendraeth Fach ('small Gwendraeth' in Welsh) flows further to the north having its source about 4 miles north of Cross Hands near the 190-metre (620 ft) contour at Penrhiwgoch. Passing under the A48 road, it is soon below the 160-foot (50 m) contour, flowing in a south-westerly direction to the south of Llanddarog, Cwmisfael and Llangyndeyrn, before turning southwards through Mynyddygarreg. It reaches the estuary to the west of Kidwelly after passing through the town centre.

The two branches follow almost parallel courses to the sea. The valleys of both rivers flow through a mixture of modestly steep coal mining communities and through the verdant agricultural land of Carmarthenshire.

When Thomas Kymer built his canal to carry coal from pits at Pwll y Llygod on the banks of the Gwendraeth Fawr to Ythyn Frenig, about half a mile to the west of Kidwelly on the southern bank of the Gwendraeth Fach, the authorising act of Parliament included powers to divert the course of the Gwendraeth Fawr from Pwll y Llygod to Pont Spwdwr, where the Kidwelly to Llanelli turnpike road crossed the river. The canal was built and operational by May 1768, and was later incorporated into the Kidwelly and Llanelly Canal. Although the route across the sands to the dock that he built was often affected by silting, it continued to be used for the export of coal long after the canal had been replaced by a railway. Coasters carried the cargo to Laugharne, Carmarthen, St Clears and Llanstephan, with the last recorded sailing bound for Llanstephan in the early 1920s.

The most notable place of interest is Kidwelly Castle, perched above the estuary of the Gwendraeth Fach. The Gwendraeth estuary widens rapidly before joining with the estuaries of the River Tywi and the River Tâf to form a three-branched estuary.

To the south of the estuary are the great flat sands of Cefn Sidan and Pembrey, whilst across the estuary on the banks of the River Taf is Laugharne famed for its association with Dylan Thomas.

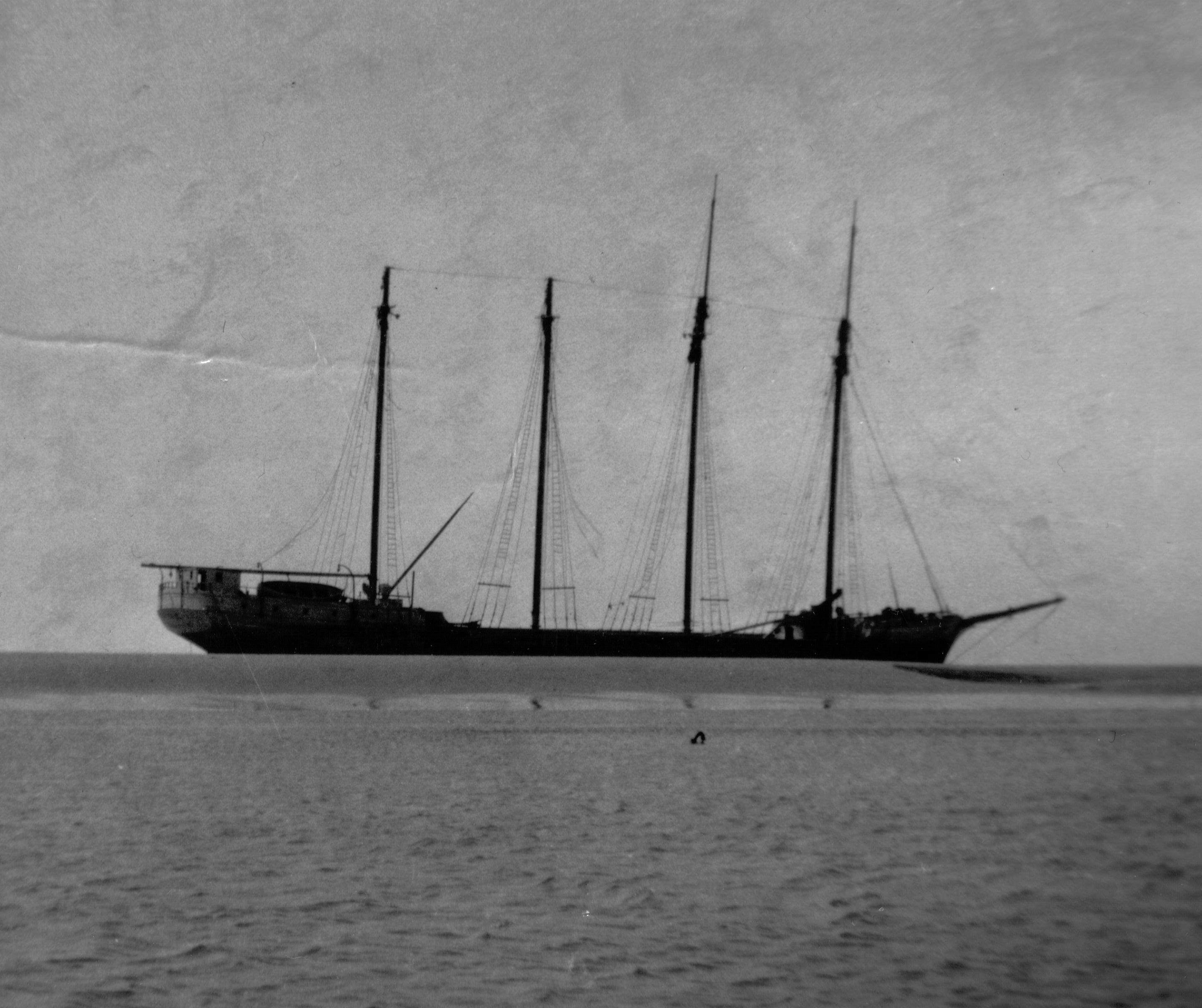
The SV Paul on the Gwendraeth in 1925

The SV Paul is one of the many shipwrecks in the vicinity of the Gwendraeth and the Cefn Sidan sands.

The two points enclosing the mouth of the Gwendraeth are Salmon Point Scar (northern side) and Tywyn Point (southern side).

== Bibliography ==
- W H Morris (1970). "The Canals of the Gwendraeth Valley, Part 1". The Carmarthenshire Antiquary, Vol VI.
- W H Morris (1990). "The Port of Kidwelly". The Carmarthenshire Antiquary, Vol XXVI.
- Hanes Cymoedd y Gwendraeth a Llanelli, A History of the Gwendraeth Valleys and Llanelli, by D. Huw Owen, 2014 (ISBN 9781847719003)
