= Mochdre Sports F.C. =

Association football club in Wales

Mochdre Sports
- Full name: Mochdre Sports Football Club
- Founded: 1929
- Ground: MSA Sports Arena, Swan Road, Mochdre, LL28 5HB
- League: North Wales Coast East Premier Division
- 2025–26: North Wales Coast East Premier Division, 4th of 12
Home colours

Mochdre Sports Football Club is a Welsh football team based in the village of Mochdre, located to the west of Colwyn Bay, Wales. The team play in the North Wales Coast East Premier Division.

== History ==
The club was formed in 1929 and played in the 1929–30 Vale of Conwy League and through various guises, Mochdre has had a football team ever since.

From the mid-1980s the club played in the Welsh Alliance League for seven seasons.

Following the en bloc resignation of the club committee and management the club nearly ceased to exist in the summer of 2012.

For the 2014–15 season the club rejoined the Welsh Alliance League Division Two from the Vale of Clwyd & Conwy League.

In 2020 the team was accepted into the Premier Division of the new North Wales Coast East Football League.

Since 2020, the Chairman has been Martin Brady. Since 6th June 2025, Jason Williams has been the First Team Manager, with Martin Harwood his Assistant Manager. Williams replaced Jonny Smith who had been manager since 2019. In May 2025, Smith became Head of Youth Development for the club.

== Honours ==
- Vale of Conwy Football League Division One - Champions (5): 1958–59 (as Mochdre Youth); 1976–77; 1983–84; 1984–85; 1992–93;
- Vale of Conwy Football League Division Two - Champions (4): 1970–71; 1979–80 (reserves); 1982–83 (reserves); 1985–86 (reserves)
- Vale of Conwy League Challenge Cup - Winners (2): 1992–93; 2000–01
- Clwyd Football League Division One – Champions: 2004–05
- Clwyd Cup - Winners: 2012–13
- President's Cup - Winners: 2012–13
- Premier Cup - Winners: 2013–14
- Ron Jones Trophy – Winners (4): 1978–79 (reserves); 1983–84 (reserves); 2000–01; 2001–02
- Frank Tyldesey Trophy – Winners (3): 1989–90 (reserves); 1990–91 (reserves); 1992–93
- Cawley Bros Trophy – Winners: 1989-99
- Cookson Cup – Winners: – 2025–26
