= Caernarvon Athletic F.C. =

Former association football club in Wales

Caernarvon Athletic
- Full name: Caernarvon Athletic Football Club
- Founded: 1919
- Dissolved: 1930
- Ground: The Oval, Caernarfon

Caernarvon Athletic F.C. was a Welsh football team.

== History ==
The club was formed after the Great War and until 1921 played in the North Wales Coast League and thereafter the Welsh National League (North) Division Two (West), with mixed fortune. In 1926, however, a limited company was formed and a full-time manager and professional team engaged. The club met with immediate success, winning the Welsh National League Division One championship in 1926–27, ahead of Bangor City and Rhyl, and repeating the feat in 1929–30 having been pipped to the title by Connah's Quay & Shotton 12 months earlier. Caernarvon Athletic are still remembered for their FA Cup run in 1929 when they defeated Darlington before going out to Bournemouth in a second round replay, the first game at the Oval attracting a crowd of some 9,000. In 1930, however, the club went into liquidation but two years later a re-formed team won the Welsh Combination before quitting over problems in using the Oval.

=== Honours ===
- Welsh National League (North) Division One
  - Champions: 1926–27, 1929–30
  - Runners-up: 1928–29
- Welsh National League (North) Division Two West
  - Runners-up: 1922–23
