= Penmaenmawr Phoenix F.C. =

Association football club in Wales

Penmaenmawr Phoenix
- Full name: Penmaenmawr Phoenix Football Club
- Nickname: Phoenix
- Ground: Cae Sling
- Capacity: 550 (50 seated)
- Chairman: Peter Williams
- Manager: Az Keating
- League: Ardal NW League
- Ardal NW League, 12th of 16

Penmaenmawr Phoenix Football Club is a Welsh football team based in Penmaenmawr, Conwy County Borough, Wales. The team play in the Ardal NW League.

== History ==
=== Pre World War One ===
Penmaenmawr Swifts first appeared in 1896 and entered the Welsh Junior Cup where they lost against St Asaph Athletic. They returned to the competition the following season but lost against Bangor Reserves.

In 1900-01 they entered the North Wales Coast League but finished eighth and bottom. They did not enter a league competition in 1901-02 but did return in 1902-03.

As Penmaenmawr Football Club, the 1902–03 season saw the club feature in the North Wales Coast League, finishing sixth from ten clubs in that season's table. The following season saw them finishing bottom of the league and not featuring in the league again until the 1910–11 season where they returned as a Division Two club, finishing fifth from the ten clubs that started the season. For the remaining three seasons until football was suspended during World War One, the team played in the same division, with the final 1913–14 season seeing their best performance, finishing third.

During this period they played at Groesffordd Field and their club colours were yellow.

=== 1920s ===
The first team joined the new Welsh National League (North) from the inaugural 1921–22 season, playing in Division Two (West) and finishing fourth from 14 clubs. After a couple of seasons where the club finished near the top of the table, the 1924–25 season saw the club crowned champions and the following season as league runners-up. The club remained in the league until the end of the 1929–30 season, when the league folded.

During the same period, during the 1922–23 season, the club's reserves side took the Vale of Conwy League title.

=== 1930s ===
At the start of the 1930s the club joined the newly formed North Wales Football Combination, playing in the league for one season before resigning. The club was forced to fold after being unable to pay its debts. The following five seasons saw no football at the club before the club returned for the 1936–37 season, finishing as runners-up in the Vale of Conwy League (as Division Three of the Welsh National League), a feat they repeated the following season. The final two seasons before World War Two saw success as the club finished league champions on both occasions.

=== Post World War Two ===
After the war, the club joined the Welsh League North from the 1947–48 season, a league they played in until the end of the 1973–74 season. The club tended to finish in the bottom half of the table with it finishing at, or the near the bottom of the table on a number of occasions. The 1973–74 season saw the club's reserve side finished as champions of the second division of the Vale of Conwy League and in the following season, the club's first team switched to Division One of the Conwy league, where it remained throughout the rest of the 1970s and the 1980s. The 1980s saw the club finish near the top of the league, finishing as runners-up on four occasions. The last season under the name Penmaenmawr F.C. was the 1988–89 season where they finished as Division One runners-up.

=== Penmaenmawr Phoenix ===
The club played in the Vale of Conwy Football League for the 1989–90 season as Penmaenmawr Phoenix, finishing the season as champions and gaining promotion to the Gwynedd League for the 1990–91 season where they finished fourth. After one more season in the league, the club moved up to the Welsh Alliance League for the 1992–93 season. They finished bottom of the table for two seasons before leaving the league and returning to the Gwynedd League for a single season. The 1995–96 season saw the club in the Clwyd Football League finishing bottom of the table in the Premier Division. The following three seasons saw the club finish near the top of the table in 7th, 5th and 4th places respectively.

The club returned to the Welsh Alliance League for the 1999–2000 season and then spent seven seasons either near or at the bottom of the table, leaving the league again at the end of the 2005–06 season and re-joining the Clwyd Football League. The club applied to re-join Alliance League for the 2010–11 season and did then join as a Division Two team. They remained in the league for ten seasons, with the final season of the league being their highest finishing position in third place, in a season that ended early to due COVID-19 virus with the league's final table decided on a points per game basis.

In 2020 the team was accepted into the Premier Division of the new North Wales Coast East Football League.

In June 2020 the club were awarded Tier 3 certification on appeal, meaning the club would be able to take up a place in the Ardal Leagues if they gain promotion.

== Honours ==
=== as Penmaenmawr FC ===
- Welsh National League (North) Division Two West
  - Champions (1): 1924–25
  - Runners-up (1): 1925–26
- Vale of Conwy League
  - Champions (3): 1922–23 (reserves), 1938–39; 1939–40
  - Runners-up (6): 1936–37; 1937–38, 1984–85, 1985–86, 1988–87, 1988–89
- Vale of Conwy League Section B
  - Runners-up (1): 1973–74
- North Wales Coast FA Intermediate Cup – Winners (1): 1924–25
- North Wales Football Combination Challenge Cup – Winners (1): 1930–31
- Vale of Conway Challenge Cup – Winners (1): 1936–37

=== as Penmaenmawr Phoenix FC ===
- North Wales Coast East Premier
  - Champions (1): 2024–25
- Vale of Conwy League
  - Champions (1): 1989–90
- Welsh Alliance League Challenge Cup
  - Runners-up (1): 2018–19
- Clwyd League President's Cup:
  - Runners-up (1): 2007–08
- NWCFA Intermediate Cup
  - Winners: 2024–25
- Cookson Cup
  - Winners: 2024–25
- NWCFA Reserve League
  - Champions: 2021–22, 2022–23
