= Bow F.C. =

Former football club based in Prestatyn

Bow
- Full name: Bow Football Club
- Founded: 2022
- Dissolved: 2025
- Ground: Bastion Road, Prestatyn
- 2024–25: North Wales Coast East Premier, 13th of 15
Home colours	Away colours

Bow F.C. was a football club based in Prestatyn, Wales. They played in the North Wales Coast East Football League for three seasons between 2022 and 2025.

The club played at Bastion Road, the home ground of Prestatyn Town.

== History ==
The club was formed in 2022 as a replacement of former Rhyl & District Sunday League side Bar Bow, and joined the North Wales Coast East Football League Division One, in Saturday football. They finished fourth in their first season, and went out of the NWCFA Junior Cup to eventual winners Abergele.

In their second season they were Division One champions, and promoted to the league's Premier Division. They also won the REM Jones Cup, beat Y Glannau and Kinmel Bay in the FAW Trophy, and reached the semi-finals of the NWCFA Junior Cup. In the semi-final of the Junior Cup, Bow lost 8–1 to Y Glannau, but disputes over an allegedly ineligible player playing for Y Glannau led to the competition not being completed.

The 2024–25 season started strongly, with a win over third-tier Dolgellau Athletic in the Welsh Cup first qualifying round. They went out of the competition in the second qualifying round and also won in two rounds of the FAW Trophy and NWCFA Junior Cup. However later in the season the loss of many players led the club to finish third from bottom, and the club resigned from the league and folded.

They also had a reserve team in the NWCFA Development League, which was formed for the 2023–24 season. In the 2024–25 season this team finished 8th out of 9 teams in the league's Premier Division.

== Honours ==
- North Wales Coast East Football League Division One – Champions: 2023–24
- REM Jones Cup – Winners: 2023–24
