= Llandudno Amateurs (2017) F.C. =

Association football club in Wales

Llandudno Amateurs Football Club
- Founded: 2017
- Ground: Maesdu Park
- Owner: Gaz Sharp
- Chairman: Carl Nichols
- Coach: Gaz Sharp, Kyle Johnson, Ben Wheeler
- League: North Wales Coast East Premier Division
- 2024–25: North Wales Coast East Premier Division, 10th of 15

Llandudno Amateurs F.C. are a Welsh football club from Llandudno, Conwy County Borough, North Wales. They play at Maesdu Park, which is also the home of Llandudno F.C., and are members of the North Wales Coast East Premier Division.

== History ==
Formed in 2017, the club having gained two back-to-back promotions as champions of the Vale of Clwyd and Conwy Football League Premier and First divisions. They have also been noted for their 5–2 Welsh Cup win in 2018 over Greenfield.

The club previously played at The Oval, alongside Llandudno Athletic, but moved away from the ground due to poor facilities.

In the 2025–26 season they were champions of the North Wales Coast East Football League Premier Division.

== Honours ==
- Vale of Clwyd and Conwy Football League Premier Division - Champions: 2018–19.
- Vale of Clwyd and Conwy Football League First Division - Champions: 2017–18
- North Wales Coast East Football League Premier Division - Champions: 2025–26
- North Wales Coast East Football League Division One - Runners-up: 2023–24
- President's Cup - Runners-up: 2017–18

== See also ==
- Llandudno Amateurs – a team of the same name which existed in the Edwardian era.
