= Machno United F.C. =

Association football club in Wales

Machno United
- Full name: Machno United
- Founded: 1947
- Ground: Tyn Ddol, Penmachno
- Manager: Owen John Davis
- 2019–20: Vale of Clwyd and Conwy Football League Division One

Machno United Football Club (Welsh: Clwb Pêl Droed Machno Unedig) is a Welsh football team based in Penmachno, Conwy, North Wales. The team was due to play in North Wales Coast East Football League Division One for the 2021–22 season, which is at the fifth tier of the Welsh football league system, but withdrew before the season started.

== History ==
The club, formed in 1947, have won 12 Vale of Conwy League titles, the NWCFA Junior Cup twice and lifted championships in the Caernarfon and District and Vale of Clwyd and Conwy leagues.

In 2017, the club's supporters helped secure the club's future by fundraising efforts to purchase the field they had played on for the last 85 years after the retirement of the farmer who owned the land led to it coming up for sale.

In July 2020 it was confirmed that the club would join the new North Wales Coast East Football League as a Division One side, tier 5 of the Welsh football pyramid. However, in May 2021, the club confirmed they would be taking a season off and withdrew from the league before the season started, citing problems with the club's pitch and the impact of the COVID-19 pandemic on player availability.

== Honours ==
=== League ===
- Vale of Conwy League
  - Champions (12): 1948–49, 1949–50, 1960–61, 1966–67, 1967–68, 1968–69, 1971–72, 1972–73, 1973–74, 1985–86, 1991–92, 1994–95
  - Runners-up (8): 1951–52, 1953–54, 1959–60, 1974–75, 1983–84, 1993–94, 1995–96, 2001–02
- Gwynedd League
  - Premier Division – Runners-up: 1990–91
  - Division One – Runners-up: 2002–03
- Caernarfon & District League
  - Division Two – Champions: 2011–12
- Vale of Clwyd and Conwy Football League
  - Division One – Champions: 2012–13

=== Cups ===
- North Wales Coast FA Junior Challenge Cup - Winners (2): 1967–68, 1994–95
- Gwynedd Cup – Winners: 1990–91
- John Hughes Challenge Cup – Winners: 2001–02
- Wynnstay Trophy – Winners: 2001–02
- Mooring's Cup – Runners-up: 2008–09
- REM Jones Cup – Winners: 2012–13
