= Brian Griffiths =

Brian Griffiths may refer to:

- Brian Griffiths (artist) (born 1968), artist based in London
- Brian Griffiths (footballer) (born 1933), Welsh former footballer
- Brian Griffiths, Baron Griffiths of Fforestfach (born 1941), British Conservative politician
- Bill Griffiths (poet) (Brian William Bransom Griffiths, 1948–2007)
- Jim Griffiths (cricketer) (Brian James Griffiths, born 1949), Northamptonshire bowler

== See also ==
- Bryan Griffiths (born 1965), English former footballer
- Bryan Griffiths (footballer, born 1939)
- Brian Griffith (disambiguation)
