= Bangor City F.C. in European football =

Bangor City F.C. was a Welsh football club based in Bangor, Gwynedd, which withdrew from the Cymru North in February 2022 and was subsequently dissolved in January 2025. Bangor have won the Welsh Cup eight times and the Welsh Premier League three times. and City's first participation in European competition was during the 1962–63 season, when they competed in the European Cup Winners' Cup after winning the Welsh Cup. The club's first match was against Napoli of the Italian Serie A. Bangor did not compete again in Europe for 23 years until the 1985–86 season when they once again played in the European Cup Winners' Cup. City did not see regular European action until the formation of the League of Wales (later Welsh Premier League, now Cymru Premier) in 1992.

To meet UEFA regulations, Bangor have played some home European games at Belle Vue in Rhyl and the Racecourse Ground in Wrexham.

== Matches ==
1962–63 UEFA Cup Winners' Cup

| 5 Sept 1962 First round 1st leg | Bangor City (Wales) | 2–0 | (Italy) Napoli | Bangor |
| | Matthews 38'; Birch 82' (pen.) | Report | | Stadium: Farrar Road Stadium; Attendance: 8,000; Referee: J. H. Martens (Denmark) |

| 26 Sept 1962 First round 2nd leg | Napoli (Italy) | 3–1 | (Wales) Bangor City | Naples |
| | Mariani 29'; Ronzon 34'; Pornella 84' | Report | McAllister 79' | Stadium: Stadio San Paolo; Attendance: 80,000; Referee: Daniel Mellet (France) |

| 10 Oct 1962 First round Replay | Bangor City (Wales) | 1–2 | (Italy) Napoli | London |
| 19:30 (UTC +1) | McAllister 66' | Report | Rosa 36', 83' | Stadium: Highbury Stadium; Attendance: 21,895; Referee: A. Holland (England) |

1985–86 UEFA Cup Winners' Cup

| 18 Sept 1985 First round 1st leg | Fredrikstad FK (Norway) | 1–1 | (Wales) Bangor City | Fredrikstad |
| | E. Williams 60' | Report | Deunk 87' | Stadium: Fredrikstad stadion Attendance: 2,611; Referee: Gudmundssen (Iceland) |

| 2 Oct 1985 First round 2nd leg | Bangor City (Wales) | 0–0 (1–1 agg.) | (Norway) Fredrikstad FK | Bangor |
| | | Report | | Stadium: Farrar Road Stadium; Attendance: 2,984 |

| 23 Oct 1985 Sec. round 1st leg | Bangor City (Wales) | 0–2 | (Spain) Atlético Madrid | Bangor |
| | | Report | da Silva 5'; Setien 25' | Stadium: Farrar Road Stadium; Attendance: 5,181 |

| 6 Nov 1985 Sec. round 2nd leg | Atlético Madrid (Spain) | 1–0 (3–0 agg.) | (Wales) Bangor City | Madrid |
| | Landáburu 27' | Report | | Stadium: Vicente Calderón Stadium; Attendance: 8,000 |

1994–95 UEFA Cup

| 9 Aug 1994 Prem. round 1st leg | Bangor City (Wales) | 1–2 | (Iceland) ÍA Akranes | Bangor |
| 19:30 (UTC +2) | Mottram 53' | Report | Reynisson 42'; Jonsson 47' | Stadium: Farrar Road Stadium; Attendance: 3,426; Referee: M Pereira (Portugal) |

| 24 Aug 1994 Prem. round 2nd leg | ÍA Akranes (Iceland) | 2–0 (4–1 agg.) | (Wales) Bangor City | Akranes |
| 19:00 (UTC +2) | Ingolfsson 8'; O. Thordarssen 21' | Report | | Stadium: Akranesvöllur; Attendance: 1,200; Referee: Alain Hamer (Luxembourg) |

1995–96 UEFA Cup

| 8 Aug 1995 Prem. round 1st leg | Bangor City (Wales) | 0–4 | (Poland) Widzew Łódź | Bangor |
| | | Report | Koniarek 51', 89'; Czerwiec 25', 42' | Stadium: Farrar Road Stadium; Attendance: 1,623; Referee: M Ancion (Belgium) |

| 22 Aug 1995 Prem. round 2nd leg | Widzew Łódź (Poland) | 1–0 (5–0 agg.) | (Wales) Bangor City | Łódź |
| | Pikuta 84' | Report | | Stadium: Stadion Widzewa; Attendance: 4,371; Referee: A Wieser (Austria) |

1998–99 UEFA Cup Winners' Cup

| 13 Aug 1998 Qual. round 1st leg | Bangor City (Wales) | 0–2 | (Finland) FC Haka | Bangor |
| | | Report | Niemi 40'; Salli 60' | Stadium: Farrar Road Stadium; Attendance: 1,425; Referee: Gennadi Yakubovsky (Belarus) |

| 27 Aug 1998 Qual. round 2nd leg | FC Haka (Finland) | 1–0 (3–0 agg.) | (Wales) Bangor City | Valkeakoski |
| | Ruhanen 28' | Report | | Stadium: Tehtaan kenttä Attendance: 2,451; Referee: Sergejs Braga (Latvia) |

2000–01 UEFA Cup

| 10 Aug 2000 Prem. round 1st leg | Bangor City (Wales) | 0–7 | (Sweden) Halmstads BK | Wrexham |
| | | Report | Andersson 29'; Svensson 31'; Arvidsson 44'; Selakovic 49', 81'; Karlsson 86'; Bertilsson 90' | Stadium: Racecourse Ground; Attendance: 761; Referee: Oleg Timotejev (Estonia) |

| 24 Aug 2000 Prem. round 2nd leg | Halmstads BK (Sweden) | 4–0 (11–0 agg.) | (Wales) Bangor City | Gothenburg |
| | Arvidsson 6', 26'; Bertilsson 35'; Selakovic 77' | Report | | Stadium: Ullevi; Attendance: 646; Referee: Nikolai Ivanov (Russia) |

2002–03 UEFA Cup

| 15 Aug 2002 Prem. round 1st leg | Bangor City (Wales) | 1–0 | (Serbia and Montenegro) FK Sartid Smederevo | Wrexham |
| 19:30 (UTC +2) | Roberts 69' | Report | | Stadium: Racecourse Ground; Attendance: 976; Referee: Smolik Siarhei (Belarus) |

| 29 Aug 2002 Prem. round 2nd leg | FK Sartid Smederevo (Serbia and Montenegro) | 2–0 (2–1 agg.) | (Wales) Bangor City | Smederevo |
| | Zečević 14'; Mirosavljević 58' | Report | | Stadium: Stadion Tvrđava; Referee: K Stadsgaard (Denmark) |

2003 UEFA Intertoto Cup

| 21 Jun 2003 First round 1st leg | Bangor City (Wales) | 0–1 | (Romania) Gloria Bistriţa | Rhyl |
| 15:00 (UTC +2) | | Report | Jula 69' | Stadium: Belle Vue; Attendance: 1,032; Referee: Brage Sandmoen (Norway) |

| 28 Jun 2003 First round 2nd leg | Gloria Bistriţa (Romania) | 5–2 (6–2 agg.) | (Wales) Bangor City | Bistriţa |
| 16:00 (UTC +3) | Anca 25'; Sânmărtean 55', 85'; Mândrean 65'; Bucuriaia 89' | Report | Evans 16', 90' (pen.) | Stadium: Stadionul Gloria; Attendance: 1,300 |

2005 UEFA Intertoto Cup

| 19 Jun 2005 First round 1st leg | Bangor City (Wales) | 1–2 | (Latvia) Dinaburg FC | Rhyl |
| 18:00 | Eltermanis 44' (o.g.) | Report | Sokolskis 5'; Valuškins 67' | Stadium: Belle Vue; Attendance: 832; Referee: Svein Oddvar Moen (Norway) |

| 26 Jun 2005 First round 2nd leg | Dinaburg FC (Latvia) | 2–0 (4–1 agg.) | (Wales) Bangor City | Daugavpils |
| 18:00 | Sokolskis 13'; Atherton 56' (o.g.) | Report | | Stadium: Celtnieks Stadium; Attendance: 640; Referee: Ararat Tchagharyan (Armenia) |

2008–09 UEFA Cup

| 17 Jul 2008 First quali. 1st leg | Bangor City (Wales) | 1–6 | (Denmark) FC Midtjylland | Wrexham |
| 18:00 | Davies 24' | Report | Florescu 19'; Reid 40'; Christensen 53', 58', 63'; Mikkel Thygesen 71' | Stadium: Racecourse Ground; Attendance: 750; Referee: Pavle Radovanovic (Montenegro) |

| 31 Jul 2008 First quali. 2nd leg | FC Midtjylland (Denmark) | 4–0 (10–1 agg.) | (Wales) Bangor City | Herning |
| 18:00 | Nworuh 4', 36'; Sivebæk 57'; Babatunde 78' | Report | | Stadium: SAS Arena; Attendance: 4,060; Referee: Karen Nalbandyan (Armenia) |

2009–10 UEFA Europa League

| 16 Jul 2009 First quali. 1st leg | FC Honka (Finland) | 2–0 | (Wales) Bangor City | Espoo |
| 18:00 | Perovuo 15'; Schüller 74' | Report | | Stadium: Tapiolan Urheilupuisto; Attendance: 1,668; Referee: Matej Jug (Slovenia) |

| 23 Jul 2009 First quali. 2nd leg | Bangor City (Wales) | 0–1 (0–3 agg.) | (Finland) FC Honka | Wrexham |
| 21:05 | | Report | Puustinen 39' | Stadium: Racecourse Ground; Attendance: 902; Referee: Peter Sippel (Germany) |

2010–11 UEFA Europa League

| 15 Jul 2010 Second Qual. 1st leg | FC Honka (Finland) | 1–1 | (Wales) Bangor City | Vantaa |
| 18:00 | Savage 43' | Report | Jones 58' | Stadium: ISS Stadion; Attendance: 1,279; Referee: Dimitar Meckarovski (Macedonia) |

| 22 Jul 2010 Second Qual. 2nd leg | Bangor City (Wales) | 2–1 (3–2 agg.) | (Finland) FC Honka | Wrexham |
| 20:30 | Morley 85'; Jones 90+1' | Report | Koskinen 21' | Stadium: Racecourse Ground; Attendance: 954; Referee: Arman Amirkhanyan (Armenia) |

| 29 Jul 2010 Third Qual. 1st leg | C.S. Marítimo (Portugal) | 8–2 | (Wales) Bangor City | Funchal |
| 20:45 | Tchô 33', 79'; Danilo 38', 75'; Baba 51', 78'; Kanú 80'; Fidélis 90+1' | Report | Ward 73'; Jebb 90+4' | Stadium: Estádio da Madeira; Referee: Oliver Drachta (Austria) |

| 5 Aug 2010 Third Qual. 2nd leg | Bangor City (Wales) | 1–2 (3–10 agg.) | (Portugal) C.S. Marítimo | Wrexham |
| 20:30 | Bull 9' | Report | Adilson 48'; Marquinho 58' | Stadium: Racecourse Ground; Attendance: 556; Referee: Mihaly Fabian (Hungary) |

2011–12 UEFA Europa League

| 13 July 2011 Second Qual. 1st leg | Bangor City (Wales) | 0–3 | (Finland) HJK Helsinki | Belle Vue, Rhyl^{1} |
| 19:30 | Edwards (substituted on) Jones (substituted off) 68'; Smyth (substituted on) Ward (substituted off) 68'; Wilson (substituted on) Bull (substituted off) 68' | Report | 14', 55' Sadik; 89' Sorsa (yellow card) 50' Kansikas; (yellow card) 64' Sadik; (substituted off) 63' Mannström (substituted on) Sorsa; (substituted off) 71' Sadik (substituted on) Fowler; (substituted off) 83' Pukki (substituted on) Parikka | Attendance: 1,189; Referee: Anton Genov (Bulgaria) |

| 19 July 2011 Second Qual. 2nd leg | HJK Helsinki (Finland) | 10–0 (13–0 agg.) | (Wales) Bangor City | Sonera Stadium, Helsinki |
| 18:00 UTC+03:00 | Ring 37'; Sadik 44'; Zeneli 47', 54'; Rafinha 52'; Pukki 64', 67'; Kastrati 66', 88'; Parikka 71' | Report | (yellow card) 33' Johnston; (yellow card) 73'Garside; (yellow card) 77' Brewerton; (substituted off) 56' Hoy (substituted on) Williams | Attendance: 5,944; Referee: Davit Kharitonashvili (Georgia) |

2012–13 UEFA Europa League

| 5 July 2012 First Qual. 1st leg | Bangor City (Wales) | 0–0 | (Moldova) Zimbru Chişinău | Nantporth, Bangor |
| 20:45 | Chris Simm (yellow card) 53' Sion Edwards (substituted off) 68' Chris Jones (substituted on); Chris Simm (substituted off) 68' Alan Bull (substituted on); Mark Smyth (substituted off) 77' Dave Morley (substituted on) | Report | (yellow card) 50' Radu Catan; (yellow card) 57' Serghei Cuzneţov; (yellow card) 63' Andriy Derkach; (yellow card) 90' Volodymyr Zastavnyi; (substituted off) 46' Janko Tumbasević (substituted on) Constantin Iavorschi; (substituted off) 70' Levan Korgalidze (substituted on) Oleg Şişchin; (substituted off) 77' Akhmet Barakhoyev (substituted on) Eugen Slivca | Attendance: 1,022; Referee: Christos Nicolaides (Cyprus) |

| 12 July 2012 First Qual. 2nd leg | Zimbru Chişinău (Moldova) | 2–1 (2–1 agg.) | (Wales) Bangor City | Zimbru Stadium, Chișinău |
| 18:30 UTC+03:00 | Molla 29', 31' | Report | 44' Smyth | Attendance: 2,700; Referee: Ognjen Valjić (Bosnia and Herzegovina) |

2014–15 UEFA Europa League

| 3 July 2014 First Qual. 1st leg | Stjarnan (Iceland) | 4–0 | (Wales) Bangor City | Stjörnuvöllur |
| 21:15 UTC | Finsen 13' (pen.), 54'; Gunnarsson 16'; Björgvinsson 70' | Report | | Attendance: 908; Referee: Aleksandrs Anufrijevs (Latvian Football Federation) |

| 3 July 2014 First Qual. 2nd leg | (Wales) Bangor City | 0–4 (0–8 agg.) | Stjarnan (Iceland) | Nantporth, Bangor |
| 19:45 UTC | | Report | Rauschenberg 53'; Björgvinsson 68', 81'; A. Jóhannsson 85' | Attendance: 805; Referee: Dag Vidar Hafsås (Norway) |

2017–18 UEFA Europa League

| 29 June 2017 First Qual. 1st leg | (Denmark) Lyngby | 1-0 | (Wales) Bangor City | Lyngby Stadium |
| 17:31 | | | Bror Blume 13' | Attendance: 2574; Referee: Stavros Mantalos (Hellenic Football Federation) |

| 6 July 2017 First Qual. 2nd leg | (Wales) Bangor City | 0–3 (0–4 agg.) | (Denmark) Lyngby | Nantporth, Bangor |
| 18:30 UTC | | | Kristoffer Larsen 3'; Kristoffer Larsen 3'; Jeppe Kjær 37' | Attendance: 1089; Referee: Donatas Rumšas (Lithuanian Football Federation) |

The next season Connah's Quay Nomads took Bangor City's Europa League spot after they failed to get a uefa licence and Bangor have not played in Europe since

=== Non UEFA competitions ===
1977–78 Anglo-Italian Cup

| 22 March 1978 First round | Bangor City (Wales) | 5–1 | (Italy) Reggiana | Bangor |
| | Mason 9'; Hipwell 33'; Broadhead 43'; Broadhead 67'; Broadhead 76' | Report | Gasperini 63' | Stadium: Farrar Road Stadium; Attendance: N/A; Referee: Mcnally |

| 25 March 1978 Second round | Bangor City (Wales) | 2–1 | (Italy) Treviso | Bangor |
| | Hipwell 18'; Charlton 23' | Report | De Poli 13' | Stadium: Farrar Road Stadium; Attendance: N/A; Referee: Bridges |

| 23 June 1978 Third round | Paganise (Italy) | 1–0 | (Wales) Bangor City | Pagani |
| | Giorgio 61' | Report | | Stadium: Stadio Marcello Torre; Attendance: N/A; Referee: Altobelli di Roma |

| 25 June 1978 Fourth round | Reggiana (Italy) | 2–2 | (Wales) Bangor City | Reggio Emilia |
| | Rosaclelio 7'; Pianca 77' | Report | Smith 75'; Williams 78' | Stadium: Stadio Mirabello; Attendance: N/A; Referee: Paparesta di Bari |

== Statistics ==
=== Record by season ===
Key

- P = Played
- W = Games won
- D = Games drawn
- L = Games lost
- F = Goals for
- A = Goals against
- PR = Preliminary round
- R1 = First round
- R2 = Second round

| Season | Competition | P | W | D | L | F | A | Opposition | Round |
|---|---|---|---|---|---|---|---|---|---|
| 1962–63 | European Cup Winners' Cup | 3 | 1 | 0 | 2 | 4 | 5 | Napoli | PR |
| 1985–86 | European Cup Winners' Cup | 4 | 0 | 2 | 2 | 1 | 4 | Atlético Madrid | R2 |
| 1994–95 | UEFA Cup | 2 | 0 | 0 | 2 | 1 | 4 | ÍA Akranes | PR |
| 1995–96 | UEFA Cup | 2 | 0 | 0 | 2 | 0 | 5 | Widzew Łódź | PR |
| 1998–99 | UEFA Cup Winners' Cup | 2 | 0 | 0 | 2 | 0 | 3 | FC Haka | QR |
| 2000–01 | UEFA Cup | 2 | 0 | 0 | 2 | 0 | 11 | Halmstads BK | QR |
| 2002–03 | UEFA Cup | 2 | 1 | 0 | 1 | 1 | 2 | FK Smederevo | QR |
| 2003 | UEFA Intertoto Cup | 2 | 0 | 0 | 2 | 2 | 6 | Gloria Bistriţa | R1 |
| 2005 | UEFA Intertoto Cup | 2 | 0 | 0 | 2 | 1 | 4 | Dinaburg FC | R1 |
| 2008–09 | UEFA Cup | 2 | 0 | 0 | 2 | 1 | 10 | FC Midtjylland | QR |
| 2009–10 | UEFA Europa League | 2 | 0 | 0 | 2 | 0 | 2 | FC Honka | QR |
| 2010–11 | UEFA Europa League | 4 | 1 | 1 | 2 | 6 | 12 | C.S. Marítimo | QR |
| 2011–12 | UEFA Champions League | 2 | 0 | 0 | 2 | 0 | 13 | HJK Helsinki | 2QR |
| 2012–13 | UEFA Europa League | 2 | 0 | 1 | 1 | 1 | 2 | Zimbru Chişinău | 1QR |

=== Record by competition ===
Correct as of the end of the 2010–11 UEFA Europa League campaign.

| Competition | Played | Won | Drawn | Lost | Goals for | Goals against |
|---|---|---|---|---|---|---|
| UEFA Champions League | 2 | 0 | 0 | 2 | 0 | 13 |
| UEFA Cup Winners' Cup | 9 | 1 | 2 | 6 | 5 | 11 |
| UEFA Cup | 10 | 1 | 0 | 9 | 3 | 32 |
| UEFA Europa League | 8 | 1 | 2 | 5 | 7 | 17 |
| UEFA Intertoto Cup | 4 | 0 | 0 | 4 | 3 | 10 |
| Total | 33 | 3 | 4 | 26 | 18 | 83 |

=== Record by country ===
| Country | Pld | W | D | L | GF | GA | GD | Win% |
|---|---|---|---|---|---|---|---|---|
| Denmark | 2 | 0 | 0 | 2 | 1 | 10 | −9 | 0.00 |
| Finland | 8 | 1 | 1 | 6 | 3 | 24 | −21 | 12.50 |
| Iceland | 2 | 0 | 0 | 2 | 1 | 4 | −3 | 0.00 |
| Italy | 3 | 1 | 0 | 2 | 4 | 5 | −1 | 33.33 |
| Latvia | 2 | 0 | 0 | 2 | 1 | 4 | −3 | 0.00 |
| Moldova | 2 | 0 | 1 | 1 | 1 | 2 | −1 | 0.00 |
| Norway | 2 | 0 | 2 | 0 | 1 | 1 | +0 | 0.00 |
| Poland | 2 | 0 | 0 | 2 | 0 | 5 | −5 | 0.00 |
| Portugal | 2 | 0 | 2 | 0 | 3 | 10 | −7 | 0.00 |
| Romania | 2 | 0 | 2 | 0 | 2 | 6 | −4 | 0.00 |
| Serbia and Montenegro | 2 | 1 | 0 | 1 | 1 | 2 | −1 | 50.00 |
| Spain | 2 | 0 | 0 | 2 | 0 | 3 | −3 | 0.00 |
| Sweden | 2 | 0 | 0 | 2 | 0 | 11 | −11 | 0.00 |
