= Courtaulds Greenfield F.C. =

Former association football club in Wales

Courtaulds Greenfield
- Full name: Courtaulds Greenfield Football Club
- Ground: Mainetti Park, Greenfield

Courtaulds Greenfield Football Club was a Welsh football team based in Greenfield, Flintshire, North Wales. The team played in the Welsh National League (North) for two seasons in the early 1980s which was the top-level of football in North Wales in the Welsh football league system. They were league champions in 1981–82.

== History ==
Courtaulds Greenfield were a factory team for Courtaulds.

The team played in the inaugural season of the Clwyd Football League in 1974–75 along with another team representing the factory in Flint, Courtaulds Flint.

The team reached a Welsh Cup quarter final where they lost to Hereford United. In 1981–82 they were Welsh National League (North) champions. - in the 1982–83 season they finished fourth, but after that did not feature in the league. The club's reserve team played in the Clwyd League Division One during the same season, finishing 6th.

In the 1983–84 season, competing as Greenfield they finished 8th in the Premier Division of the Clwyd League.

The demise of the factory in 1985 was linked to the end of the football team.

A new club, Greenfield, formed in 2005, now represents the village, and uses the former ground of the team.

== Honours ==
- Welsh League North – Champions: 1981–82
- Clwyd Football League
  - Division One – Champions: 1976–77, 1977–78,
  - Division Two – Runners-up: 1975–76,
- NWCFA Intermediate Cup
  - Winners: 1978–79
  - Runners-up: 1976–77
