= Abergele Town F.C. =

Football club based in Abergele

Abergele Town
- Full name: Abergele Town Football Club
- Founded: 2005?
- Dissolved: 2017
- 2016–17: Welsh Alliance League Division One, 12th of 16

Abergele Town F.C. was a Welsh football club based in Abergele, Conwy County Borough. They last played in the Welsh Alliance League Division One, which was at the third tier of the Welsh football league system.

== History ==
The club was originally known as Abergele Rovers. In 2005–06 they won the Clwyd League Division Two title, and in the following season they won Division One.

In 2009–10 and 2010–11 they won back-to-back trebles, both including the Clwyd League Premier Division title. Due to a lack of suitable facilities in Abergele, the club was forced to relocate to Kinmel Bay upon promotion to the Welsh Alliance League Division Two, and was renamed to Kinmel Bay Sports. They were originally planned to be renamed to Kinmel Bay FC (Rovers) and become part of Kinmel Bay FC.

In 2013–14 Kinmel Bay Sports were runners-up in the Welsh Alliance League Division Two, gaining promotion to Division One. In 2015 the club moved to Maesdu Park in Llandudno, and renamed again, to Abergele Town. They lasted two seasons under this name before they were expelled from the league due to being unable to find a ground. As a result the club folded.

The club has also played in the Welsh Cup, including in their final season, where they reached the first round.

== Honours ==
- Welsh Alliance League Division Two - Runners-up: 2013–14
- Clwyd League Premier Division - Champions: 2009–10, 2010–11
- Clwyd League Division One - Champions: 2006–07
- Clwyd League Division Two - Champions: 2005–06
- Clwyd League Premier Division Cup - Winners: 2009–10
- President's Cup - Winners: 2010–11
