= Rhos United F.C. =

Football club based in Rhos-on-Sea

Rhos United
- Full name: Rhos United Football Club
- Founded: 1964; 62 years ago
- Ground: Betws yn Rhos Sports and Recreation Field
- Chairman: Bret Durkan
- Manager: Ross Quayle
- League: North Wales Coast East Premier Division
- 2025–26: North Wales Coast East Premier Division, 10th of 12
- Website: rhosunited.co.uk
Home colours	Away colours

Rhos United Football Club is a Welsh football club based in Rhos-on-Sea. They currently play in the North Wales Coast East Premier Division.

== History ==
Rhos United Football Club was formed in 1964 and its first ever match was on 29 August, in the Vale of Conway League against Machno United. The club's original colours were royal blue and white, and all home matches would be played at Mochdre.

In 1982 they won the Vale of Conwy League and joined the Welsh League North. When the league folded in 1984, they became founder members of the Welsh Alliance League, where they stayed until they resigned from the league due to "cash problems", 7 games into the 1988–89 season. Their results prior to their withdrawal included a 15–0 loss to Flint Town United, who they went on to be drawn against in the third round of the Welsh Intermediate Cup.

Rhos United continued in the Vale of Conwy League after withdrawal from the Welsh Alliance League. They stayed in the league until folding in June 1996. They still appeared in junior football in 1997.

The club returned to senior football for the 2006–07 season, joining the Clwyd League. When the league split in 2011 they became members of the Vale of Clwyd and Conwy League Premier Division.

In 2020 they were announced as members of the newly formed North Wales Coast East Football League, and were placed into Division One.

In the 2024–25 season they won the Division One title, as well as the REM Jones Cup, and were promoted to the Premier Division. For the new season the club appointed a new management team, with Richard Hillier-Evans as manager, Rhys Lane as team advisor, and Brandon Lee as head coach. On 31 October 2025 it was announced that Ross Quayle had been appointed as the new manager, after Hillier-Evans left to join third-tier St Asaph City.

In June 2026, Bret Durkan replaced Del Sykes as the club's chairman. In the 2025–26 season Durkan was the club's captain and he had been a regular player for a number of years.

== Colours and badge ==
Rhos United unveiled a new badge and kits in 2020. The badge was designed by a player and chosen by the players. Their new home shirt ws mostly black with a red stripe down the middle, and their away shirt was blue.

== Honours ==
- Vale of Conwy Football League - Champions: 1981–82
- North Wales Coast East Football League Division One - Champions: 2024–25
- REM Jones Cup - Winners: 2024–25

== Former players ==
Prior to folding in 1996, the original club helped a number of players on the path to playing in the Football League, including:

- Carl Dale
- Peter Suddaby
- Bob Colville
- John Moonan
- Gwyn Williams
