= Rhuddlan Town F.C. =

Association football club in Wales

Rhuddlan Town
- Full name: Rhuddlan Town Football Club
- Nickname: Town
- Founded: 1881; 145 years ago
- Ground: Pengwern College; Rhuddlan
- Chairman: Callum Roberts
- Manager: Stephen Jones
- League: North Wales Coast East Division One
- 2025–26: North Wales Coast East One, 4th of 9
Home colours	Away colours

Rhuddlan Town Football Club (Welsh: Clwb Pêl Droed Tref Rhuddlan) is a Welsh football club, playing in the North Wales Coast East Division One.

The club was founded in October 1881 and the team plays its home matches at Pengwern College, Rhuddlan.

The current version of the club was founded in 2017.

On 28 June 2022 Rhuddlan Town announced the appointment of the new club Manager John 'Barney' Barnes, the club was only weeks away from folding, and with Barney looking for a management post after resigning from Prestatyn Town FC. This was an appointment that was perfect for both parties.

In 2024 the club again came under threat of folding. The lease on their current ground at Pengwern College was to run out in just over two years, but Rhuddlan Town Council rejected a move to Admiral's Field, used by Rhuddlan Dragons Youth Football Club.

Their home kit is navy shirt and shorts, their away kit is orange shirts and black shorts.

== Honours ==
=== League ===
- Vale of Clwyd and Conwy Football League Premier Division
  - Winners (2): 2011–12, 2019–20
- Clwyd League 1st Division:
  - Winners (1): 1995–96 (reserves)
- Clwyd League 2nd Division:
  - Winners (2): 1986–87, 1994–95 (reserves)

=== Cup ===
- Presidents Cup:
  - Winners (2): 2005–06, 2006–07
- Premier Cup:
  - Winners (1): 2011–12
  - Runners-up: 2006–07
- Clwyd Cup:
  - Runners-up: 2011–12
- R.E.M. Jones Cup:
  - Winners: 2017–18, 2025-26
