= Conwy Legion United F.C. =

Football club based in Conwy

Conwy Legion United
- Full name: Conwy Legion United Football Club
- Founded: 2007 (as Mailcoach FC)
- Dissolved: 2015
- Ground: The Oval (Llandudno)
- 2014–15: Vale of Clwyd and Conwy Football League Premier Division, 2nd of 11

Conwy Legion United F.C. was a Welsh football club based in Conwy. They last played in the Vale of Clwyd and Conwy Football League Premier Division, which was at the fifth tier of the Welsh football league system.

== History ==
The club has its origins as Sunday league side Mailcoach, formed in 2007, which played in the North Gwynedd & Anglesey Sunday League. In 2012 they renamed to Conwy Legion United and moved to the Rhyl & District Sunday League. They were originally planned to rename to FC Conwy United, as local football club Conwy United had renamed to Conwy Borough.

After a season in the Rhyl & District Sunday League they moved to Saturday football, joining the Vale of Clwyd and Conwy Football League. In their first Saturday league season they won the Division One title, REM Jones Cup, and President's Cup, completing a treble. In their second season they were runners-up in the Premier Division, but they folded at the end of the season.
