= Prestatyn Sports F.C. =

Association football club in Wales

Prestatyn Sports
- Full name: Prestatyn Sports Football Club
- Founded: 2013
- Ground: The Meadows
- Chairman: John Hargreaves
- League: North Wales Coast East Division One
- 2024–25: North Wales Coast East One, 3rd of 9

Prestatyn Sports Football Club is a Welsh football team based in Prestatyn, Denbighshire, Wales. The team play in the North Wales Coast East Football League Division One, which is at the fifth tier of the Welsh football league system.

== History ==
The club was founded in 2013 by six former members of Prestatyn Rovers. A pitch in the town called 'The Meadows' was leased. The club finished runners-up in Vale of Clwyd and Conwy Football League Division One in their first season, gaining promotion to the Premier Division. The 2014–15 season saw the team achieve great success winning the Premier Division and the Division One title (the latter via the club's reserves team) as well success in multiple cup competitions.

At the end of the 2017–18 season the club were crowned as Welsh Alliance League Division Two champions. At the end of the 2019–20 season which was curtailed due to the COVID-19 pandemic, the club finished bottom of the table on a points per game basis and were relegated from tier 3, joining the newly formed North Wales Coast East Football League Premier Division.

In May 2020 the club announced it would move away from its long-term home at Gronant as the facility has failed to meet Tier 3 grading criteria. The club subsequently moved to The Meadows, and received funding help from the local council to improve the drainage in 2021.

The club resigned from the league in June 2023, ahead of the 2023–24 season, citing lack of players and the need for additional volunteers. The club planned to continue with junior teams and hoped to return in subsequent seasons.

The club returned to the league for the 2024–25 season, joining Division One. The following season they were again champions.

== Honours ==
- North Wales Coast East Football League
  - Division One – Champions: 2025–26
- Welsh Alliance League
  - Division Two – Champions: 2017–18
- Vale of Clwyd and Conwy Football League
  - Premier Division – Champions: 2014–15
  - Division One – Champions: 2014–15 (reserves)
  - Division One – Runners-up: 2013–14
- Lock Stock Challenge Cup
  - Winners: 2016–17
  - Runners-up: 2015–16
- Premier Division Cup
  - Winners: 2014–15
- North Wales Coast FA Intermediate Cup
  - Winners: 2014–15
- Presidents Cup
  - Winners: 2014–15
- R.E.M Jones Cup
  - Runners-up: 2013-14, 2025–26
