= Llanfairfechan Town F.C. =

Association football club in Wales

Llanfairfechan Town
- Full name: Llanfairfechan Football Club
- Founded: 1870
- Ground: Recreation Ground
- Chairman: Dewi williams
- Manager: Dave Pasko, Nathan Watson and Mike Hughes league North Wales Coast East Premier Division
- 2025–26: North Wales Coast East Premier Division, 9th of 12

Llanfairfechan Town Football Club is a Welsh football team based in Llanfairfechan, Conwy County Borough, Wales. The team plays in the North Wales Coast East Premier Division.

== History ==
The club played in the single division North Wales Coast League in 1904–05 league, finishing seventh out of eight clubs. They then played in the Second Division of the same league in the 1910–11, 1911–12, 1912–13 and 1913–14 seasons, with fifth place in the final season being their highest finishing position. After the war, they again appeared for two seasons in the same league (1919–20 and 1920–21) The league then absorbed into the newly established Welsh National League (North) in 1921. The club finished bottom of Division Two West.

The club played in the North Wales Football Combination for the 1930–31 season, and the Bangor & District League for the 1931–32 (reserves) and 1932–33 seasons. They then joined the North Wales Coast League where they finished as runners-up in 1933–34 and champions in the last season of the league in 1934–35. This was followed by a move to the Welsh League North for its inaugural season in 1935–36 where they finished fourth from the 11 clubs. The club dropped out of the league after the end of the season. They re-joined the league for the final season before the war, 1939–40, finishing fifth in the Western area section.

After the Second World war, the club again played in the Welsh League North between 1945 and 1946 and the end of the 1949–50 season when they finished bottom of the league. Returning again to the league as a Division Two (Western) club for 1952–53 season They then featured in Division One finishing bottom of the table in both 1956–57 and 1957–58, before leaving the league again.

They joined the Gwynedd League for the 1990–91 season, finishing in third place. The following season they finished sixth, followed by another third-place finish in the 1992–93 season. The club played for two seasons in the Welsh Alliance League between 1993–94 and 1995–96 finishing in sixth and 15th places. The club returned to the Gwynedd League for one season. The club played in the Vale of Conwy Football League finishing as champions in 1988–89 and in 2001–02, the last season the league operated. The following season they returned to the Gwynedd League finishing second from bottom of the Premier Division table and bottom of the league in 2003–04. They remained in the league until the end of the 2013–14 season.

The club subsequently joined the Vale of Clwyd and Conwy Football League.

In 2020 the team was accepted into the Premier Division of the new North Wales Coast East Football League.

== Honours ==
=== Leagues ===
- Welsh National League (North) Division Two
  - Champions: 1928–29
  - Runners-up: 1929–30
- North Wales Coast League
  - Champions: 1934–35
  - Runners-up: 1933–34
- Vale of Conwy Football League – Champions: 1998–99; 2001–02
- Vale of Clwyd and Conwy Football League Division One – Champions: 2015–16
- Vale of Clwyd and Conwy Football League Premier Division – Runners-up: 2016–17; 2017–18; 2019–20

=== Cups ===
- North Wales Coast FA Junior Challenge Cup – Winners: 1988–89
- Presidents Cup – Winners: 2017–18
- Presidents Cup – Runners-up: 2015–16
- R.E.M. Jones Cup – Winners: 2015–16
