= 1895–96 North Wales Coast League =

North Wales Coast League
- Season: 1895–96
- Champions: Bangor
- Goals: 117
- Average goals/game: 1.95

The 1895–96 North Wales Coast League was the third season of the newly formed North Wales Coast League after its establishment in 1893. The league was won by Bangor, which is considered part of Bangor's 'Grand Slam' season as they also won the Welsh Cup, North Wales Coast Senior Cup and North West Wales Challenge Cup.

== League table ==
Pos	Team	Pld	W	D	L	GF	GA	GD	Pts
1	Bangor (C)	10	7	2	1	26	11	+15	16
2	Flint	10	6	2	2	29	20	+9	14
3	Carnarvon Ironopolis	10	4	2	4	20	16	+4	10
4	Llandudno Swifts	10	3	1	6	14	18	−4	7
5	Holywell	10	3	1	6	15	31	−16	7
6	Rhyl	10	3	0	7	13	31	−18	6

Source: Welsh Football Data Archive
Rules for classification: 1) points; 2) goal difference; 3) number of goals scored.
(C) Champions
