= Llansannan F.C. =

Association football club in Wales

Llansannan
- Full name: CPD Llansannan
- Ground: Llan Siro
- League: North Wales Coast East Premier Division
- 2025–26: North Wales Coast East Premier Division, 3rd of 12

Llansannan Football Club (Welsh: Clwb Pêl Droed Llansannan) is a Welsh football team based in Llansannan, Conwy County Borough, Wales. The team play in the North Wales Coast East Premier Division.

== History ==
The team played in the Vale of Clwyd and Conwy Football League before in 2020 the team was accepted into the Premier Division of the new North Wales Coast East Football League.

== Honours ==
- Vale of Clwyd and Conwy Football League Premier Division - Runners-up: 2013–14
- Vale of Clwyd and Conwy Football League Premier Cup – Winners: 2017–18
- Vale of Clwyd and Conwy Football League Premier Cup – Runners-up: 2016–17
- Vale of Conwy Football League – Champions: 1996–97
- North Wales Coast FA Intermediate Cup – Winners: 2012–13
