= Betws-y-Coed F.C. =

Football club based in Betws-y-Coed, Conwy County Borough

Betws-y-Coed
- Full name: Betws-y-Coed Football Club
- Founded: 2011
- Dissolved: 2024
- Ground: Holyhead Road
- 2024–25: North Wales Coast East One, (withdrew from league)

Betws-y-Coed F.C. was a Welsh football club based in Betws-y-Coed, Conwy County Borough. The team last played in the North Wales Coast East Football League Division One, which is at the fifth tier of the Welsh football league system.

== History ==
The current Betws-y-Coed club was founded in 2011.

The club competed in the 2022–23 Welsh Cup, losing in the first qualifying round on penalties to Bow.

In December 2022, the club resigned from the North Wales Coast East Football League Division One. The club rejoined the league for the 2023–24 season.

The club folded again in July 2024.

== Honours ==
- Vale of Conwy Football League - Champions: 1999–2000
