= Domenico Serafino =

Italian musician

Personal details
- Born: Domenico Serafino Italy
- Occupation: Musician, singer, songwriter, music producer

Domenico Serafino (also known as Serafino) is an Italian musician, composer, singer, and music producer. He released his first album at the age of 20, featuring the song "Il mio Compare" (2001). His musical style blends funk, rock, and rap with Mediterranean influences.

== Music career ==
Serafino gained popularity in South America, particularly from the mid-1990s through the 2000s. His style is a fusion of rap, funk, and rock, with African influences in both sound and aesthetic. The video for his 1999 song "Ma Chi M'accompagna" featured former Italian international footballer Roberto Baggio.

=== Early career ===
- 1992 – Serafino’s first record-making experience was when the magazine Tournèe produced the promotional CD Albaria, which was distributed with the magazine. From 1992 to 1994, he performed a series of concerts that were reviewed by industry journalists.
- 1995 – In November, Serafino released his self-titled debut CD, which included the single "Mina Vagante". The song was played on several radio stations. On 7 June, Serafino performed with his band on the Paolo Rossi show Il Circo. On 22 December, he opened Jesus Christ Superstar at the Teatro Smiroldo in Milan.

=== Breakthrough and success ===
- 1996 – Serafino hosted Suono Vitale, a music TV programme for a private network, alongside Ilaria Paganini. On 24 December, he performed in Milan Piazza Duca D'Aosta, and TG3 aired an interview with him. During this period, Serafino, along with his friend Mimmo Ferrante, advocated for the rights of the disabled and worked against architectural and cultural barriers. Ferrante died in December 1996 from a severe form of muscular dystrophy.
- 1997 – On 4 December, Serafino released the album Provare per credere, which he composed and performed. It featured vocal contributions from artists such as Franca Rame, Paolo Rossi, Claudio Bisio, and Pino Scotto. The album was a tribute to Mimmo Ferrante. Later that year, Serafino appeared on Telethon (RAIDUE) and participated in the Help programme hosted by Red Ronnie. His interview on Tutto Musica with Paolo Rossi also received attention.
- 1998 – On 28 January, Serafino performed at Palavobis in Milan, opening a week of celebrations in honour of Gandhi. He also launched the programme Sudando Musica, a travelling show exploring Southern Italy’s musical talents. In December, the Fuego TV programme presented the video for his song "Chi mi accompagna?", featuring an interview with Roberto Baggio.

=== International recognition ===
- 1999 – On 2 February, Serafino released the single "Chi mi accompagna?"(RTI), which received attention from media outlets. At the 49th San Remo Festival, Serafino performed at the Video and Radio Italia Solo Musica Italiana space, where satellite broadcasts of his video featuring Baggio were launched. In July, Serafino performed in Fuscaldo, Calabria, after a local petition requested a concert.
- 2000 – In January, Serafino appeared on various TV shows, including Casa Mosca, where he performed live. He also participated as a guest at the Sanremo Rock Festival. Later in the year, Serafino began collaborating with actress Bedy Moratti on the piece Cerco Spiegazioni and was recognized as an emerging artist of Mediterranean music.
- 2001 – Serafino’s Unplugged concerts showcased his versatility and earned him recognition from artists like Tullio De Piscopo. The single "Il mio Compare" became a hit internationally, reaching the top of the mp3.it charts. The music video for "Il mio Compare" was filmed in Cetraro, Italy, by students from the local art school.
- 2002 – On 3 May, Serafino released the EP Uè compà, featuring four new songs available exclusively online. During the summer, his song "Naviga nella rete" topped the Italian charts on Vitaminic, and a new version of "Chi mi accompagna?" achieved similar success.
- 2003 – On 30 June, the single "Naviga nella rete" was released, followed by TV appearances, including on Girofestival (RAI TV) and TimTour in Palermo.
- 2004 – Serafino launched the Suoneria Mediterranea music program on Telespazio 1, which highlighted Southern Italian artists. He also appeared on VERISSIMO (Canale 5) and his song "A Sud io migrerò" became the theme of the summer programme La mappa dei piaceri.
- 2005 – The song "100% Calabrese Sugnu" topped the Vitaminic charts. In May, the single "Very Etnico" was released and became popular in Italy, while "A Sud io migrerò" continued to be used as the theme for La mappa dei piaceri.
- 2006 – Serafino’s music program Suoneria Mediterranea continued on Telespazio 1. His album Very Etnico was released in stores on 23 January, and he began a promotional tour in Naples. The single "Arabica Café" was broadcast by Italian radio stations. He also performed in Buenos Aires, at the Hugo del Carril Amphitheatre and the Coliseum Theatre.
- 2007 – Serafino embarked on a South American tour, performing in multiple cities along the Atlantic coast. He also appeared on AMERICA TV in Argentina and released Very Etnico in South America, where he performed concerts in Montevideo, Buenos Aires, and Patagonia.
- 2008 – Serafino performed in front of 80,000 people in Mar del Plata, Argentina, as part of his South American radio tour.
- 2009 – Serafino began shooting the music video for "Yo soy italiano" in Buenos Aires and continued to work on new songs for his upcoming album.
- 2010 – Serafino’s "Yo soy italiano" became the theme song for Cantagiro, and he toured to promote his album Mediterranea Onda. He continued to perform in South America and Europe, working with several collaborators and producing new music.

=== Shift in focus ===
From 2010 onwards, Serafino continued to perform live in various South American cities, while also working on new songs such as the Latin jazz ballad "Flaca", the rocking "Alleluia", and several other tracks. In November 2014, Serafino ceased his live performances after a concert at the Teatro Coliseo in Buenos Aires, choosing to focus on music production. In the following years, he composed new songs, including "Luna Nueva", "Vamos America Latina", "Dia de Aurora", "Don Pasquale", "A toda bronca", and "Revolution Day", the latter of which was released on 25 April 2023.

== Football chairman and owner ==
=== Bangor City ===
In the summer of 2019, Cymru Premier club Bangor City faced financial troubles under the ownership of Vaughan Sports Management and sought new investment. By September, a consortium of investors had taken control of Bangor, and Serafino was appointed as chairman. Serafino brought in Argentine World Cup winner Pedro Pasculli as the new manager of the team.

In April 2020, Serafino donated £5,000 to local hospital Ysbyty Gwynedd to help it fight the outbreak of coronavirus. The club finished the inaugural Cymru North season in fifth place; the season was curtailed by the COVID-19 pandemic, and the final table was determined on a points-per-game basis.

In April 2021, the club was refused a Tier 1 licence for failing to provide its financial accounts as part of the application, and due to an issue regarding coaching qualifications.

Concerns over unpaid wages for club players and officials were reported in the press in October 2021, noting similarities to a situation in early 2021 at Sambenedettese. The Football Association of Wales summoned the club to a disciplinary hearing. The panel ruled that "all outstanding monies" must be paid within 31 days from 29 October 2021 – the club owed nearly £53,000 of unpaid wages to players and staff – with the sanction in the event of non-payment being a ban "from all football-related activity". On 30 November, the Football Association of Wales suspended the club from all football-related activity after it failed to comply with the payment of outstanding monies. As the club was suspended from football, its Cymru North matches against five clubs were postponed between 30 November and February 2022, resulting in a deduction of three points for each missed match and a fine.

On 7 January 2022, the FAW announced that the club had not applied for a license to compete in the tier 2 Cymru North for the 2022–23 season, or at tier 3 level. On 14 January, the club's academy announced its closure with immediate effect on social media, citing a lack of support from the club and no concrete evidence from the FAW or the club that the situation would improve.

On 11 February, the FAW announced that the club had until 19 February to pay all outstanding fines or face immediate expulsion from the Cymru North. It also announced that if the club paid outstanding fines, it would have to play all subsequent league fixtures or face immediate expulsion from the league.

"A club competing in the second tier of Welsh professional football" and "a club with a noteworthy history" that "have had some spells in the international European tournaments" was advertised for sale with an asking price of £1.25 million. The club was reported as Bangor City, with the Daily Post noting that the "eye-watering price" did not include the club's ground, which was leased from the council.

On 18 February, the club announced in an official statement by Serafino that it had informed the FAW of its withdrawal from the Cymru North for the 2021–22 season. They also noted plans to return to play for the following season. Later that day, the FAW confirmed that the club's withdrawal had been accepted and its playing record in the league for the season had been expunged.

=== Sambenedettese ===
In June 2020, he was unveiled as the new owner and chairman of Italian Serie C side S.S. Sambenedettese Calcio. He claimed to have paid former owner Franco Fedeli over 1.2 million euros for the club. The deal was announced by the club on 10 June.

In late March 2021, the club's players threatened to strike and not play the match scheduled for Saturday 3 April in Matelica. A statement by the Italian Footballers Association, which published the press release, stated that the players had not received payment of the monthly salaries of November–December 2020 and January–February 2021 and that Serafino had personally assured them that he would settle the arrears of salaries no later than Friday 2 April.

In April 2021, the club was docked four points from their current campaign due to unpaid player wages, fined €3,000, and Serafino was given a six-month suspension from running football clubs in a decision by the FIGC tribunal. A pig's head was left outside Serafino's home in Italy with a photo of Serafino underneath; this was believed to be related to the lack of payment of players' wages. In early April, five companies sought bankruptcy petitions for non-payment for the delivery of services.

After Serafino's failure to comply with several financial requirements, the Court of Ascoli Piceno declared the club bankrupt in May 2021. Entrepreneur Roberto Renzi took over the club; it was refounded as A.S. Sambenedettese and, after repaying all debts, was formally accepted by the Italian Football Federation, rejoining in the Serie D league.

== Journalism investigation ==
Serafino's ownership of both clubs was part of a British Broadcasting Corporation Wales investigation, broadcast on UK television in May 2022. A few days later, Serafino publicly denounced this television report, accusing his former partner and a group close to him of organising a defamatory press campaign to weaken his position as president, causing economic and image damage to the Company and to him personally. According to Serafino, the intention of his former partner Kim Dae Jung (Baram) was to cause the bankruptcy of Sambenedettese for personal gain, attempting to buy it back at auction later. Serafino declared that he was the victim of a conspiracy to take the two clubs away from him, after having created an academy, a sports center (Samba Village), and after having started a re-foundation of the Sambenedettese, which he said was appreciated by the fans.
