= Vale of Clwyd and Conwy Football League =

- Founded: 2011
- Folded: 2020
- Country: Wales
- Divisions: 2
- Number of clubs: 21
- Level on pyramid: 5 & 6
- Promotion to: Welsh Alliance
- Domestic cup(s): Presidents Cup; Premier Cup; REM Jones Cup
- Last champions: Rhuddlan Town (2019-20)

The Vale of Clwyd and Conwy Football League (Welsh: Cynghrair Dyffryn Clwyd a Chonwy) was a football league formed in 2011 following the split of the Clwyd Football League, which itself was formed in 1974 as an amalgamation of the Dyserth League and the Halkyn Mountain League. The Premier Division was in the fifth level of the Welsh football league system in North Wales. The league folded in 2020 due to a reorganisation of the Welsh football league pyramid, with many teams joining the North Wales Coast East Football League.

The league hosted several cup competitions: The President's Cup, The Premier Cup, The Halkyn Cup and the REM Jones Cup. Its members competed in the FAW Trophy, Barritt Cup and Welsh Cup competitions as well. Along with members of the Anglesey League and the Caernarfon & District League, league teams competed in the NWCFA Junior Cup.

== Member clubs for final 2019–20 season ==
=== Premier Division ===
- Abergele
- Bro Cernyw
- Cerrigydrudion
- Llandudno Athletic
- Llanelwy Athletic
- Llanfairfechan Town
- Llansannan
- Meliden
- Rhos United
- Rhuddlan Town
- Y Glannau

=== First Division ===
- Betws-y-Coed
- Denbigh Development
- Henllan
- Llandudno Amateurs reserves
- Llanfairfechan Town reserves
- Llysfaen
- Machno United
- NFA
- Penrhyn Bay Dragons
- Rhyl All Stars

== Divisional champions ==
=== Premier Division ===
- 2011–12: Rhuddlan Town
- 2012–13: St Asaph City
- 2013–14: Llannefydd
- 2014–15: Prestatyn Sports
- 2015–16: Llandudno Albion
- 2016–17: Llannefydd
- 2017–18: Kinmel Bay
- 2018–19: Llandudno Amateurs
- 2019–20: Rhuddlan Town

=== First Division ===
- 2011–12: Betws-yn-Rhos
- 2012–13: Machno United
- 2013–14: Conwy Legion United
- 2014–15: Prestatyn Sports reserves
- 2015–16: Llanfairfechan Town
- 2016–17: Cerrigydrudion
- 2017–18: Llandudno Amateurs
- 2018–19: Llanelwy Athletic
- 2019–20: NFA
