= The Oval (Llandudno) =

Cricket and football ground in Llandudno

Coordinates: 53.3199°N 3.8379°W

Llandudno Cricket Club Ground
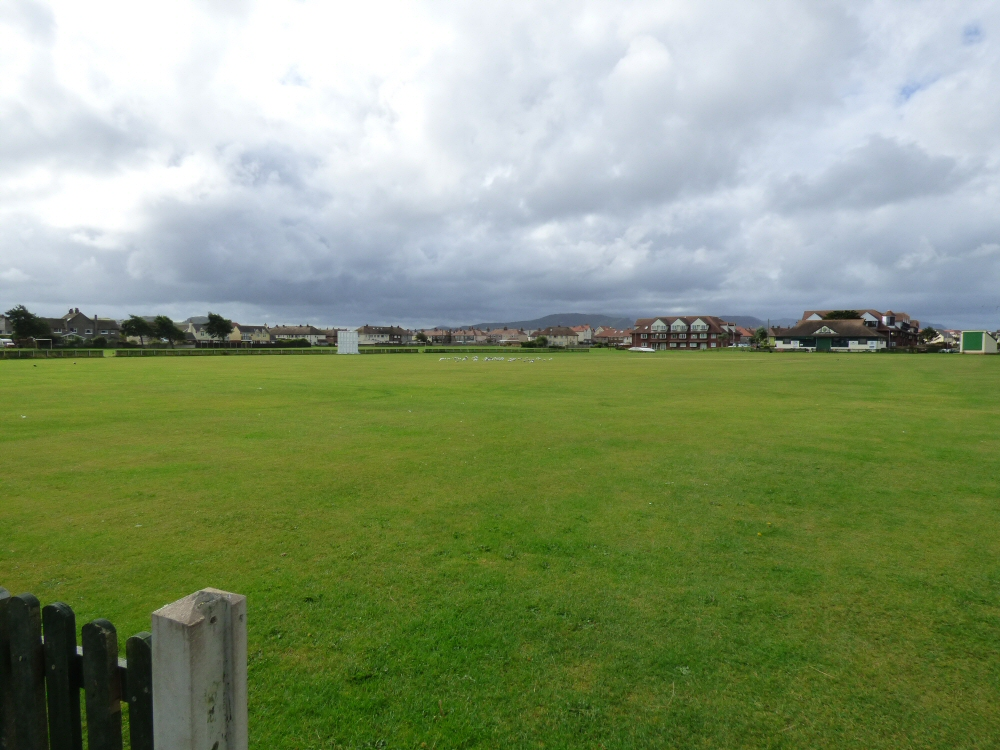
- Interactive map of Llandudno Cricket Club Ground

Ground information
- Location: Llandudno, Conwy County Borough
- Country: Wales
- Establishment: 1890 (first recorded match)

Team information
Wales	(1925 & 1927-1928)
Glamorgan	(1969)
- As of 21 August 2010; Source: Ground profile

Llandudno Cricket Club Ground is a cricket and football ground in Llandudno, Conwy County Borough, North Wales.

== History ==
=== Cricket ===
The first recorded match on the ground was in 1890, when Llandudno Visitors played Riviere's Orchestra. The ground hosted its first first-class match when Wales played Ireland in 1925. Wales next played a first-class match at the ground in 1927 against the touring New Zealanders and the following year Wales played the touring West Indians, which was the last first-class match held on the ground.

The ground has also held a single List-A match, which was between Glamorgan and Leicestershire in the 1969 Player's County League.

In local domestic cricket, the ground is the home venue of Llandudno Cricket Club who play in the North Wales Premier Cricket League.

=== Football ===
The Oval was used to host two Wales international matches; on 19 February 1898 Wales lost 1–0 to Ireland at the ground. It was used again on 24 February 1900 for a 2–0 win over Ireland.

The Oval has been used by various grassroots football clubs, including Llandudno Athletic, Llandudno Amateurs and Conwy Legion United. It is currently used by Crozzy FC.
