= Brian Griffith =

Brian Griffith may refer to:

- Brian Sean Griffith, who conspired with Tonya Harding's husband to assault her opponent
- Brian Griffith, musician in Dylan Trees
- Brian Griffith, musician in Dead Hot Workshop

== See also ==
- Brian Griffiths (disambiguation)
