= Connah's Quay & Shotton F.C. =

Former association football club in Wales

Connah's Quay & Shotton United
- Full name: Connah's Quay & Shotton United Football Club
- Nickname(s): the Fishermen, the Quayites
- Founded: July 1905 (as Connah's Quay Twenties)
- Dissolved: November 1931
- Ground: Halfway Enclosure
before World War 1 colours	after 1928 colours

Connah's Quay & Shotton United F.C. was a Welsh football team based at Connah's Quay in Flintshire. It is commonly shortened in print to Connah's Quay & Shotton as well as just Connah's Quay.

== History ==
The club formed in 1905 as Connah's Quay Twenties. They signed on the majority of the players from the recently folded Connah's Quay club (1890–1905). They rented land at the rear of the Halfway House Hotel from the Northgate Brewery, and joined the Chester and District League Division 1. Two years later they merged with local rivals Hawarden Bridge, and now named as Connah's Quay, it joined The Combination league. Later in the 1920s they were playing in the Welsh National League (North) as a fully professional outfit in 1922, It joined the Cheshire County League in 1920–21, and, after two seasons, joined the Welsh National League (North); before starting in the Welsh League, it merged with Shotton United and was re-named Connah's Quay and Shotton United.

The club played in the English FA Cup during their time; after spending the 1928–29 season in the Welsh League, it left to re-join the Cheshire County League in 1929. They had joined the Cheshire League again after an unsuccessful application to the Football League in 1929. They were runners-up to Port Vale in the 1929–30 campaign, they slipped to 18th the following season before disbanding in November 1931, halfway through the 1931–32 season.

=== Timeline ===
1890 - Original Connah's Quay club formed.
1905 - Connah's Quay folded after completing their first season in the Wirral Combination Senior Division in 1904–05. The Connah's Quay Twenties club was then formed and signed on most of the original Connah's Quay club players and joined the Chester & District League Div 1
1907 - Connah's Quay and Shotton United enter The Combination (team name shortened to Connah's Quay in most newspapers). This was after a merger of Connah's Quay Twenties and another local side Hawarden Bridge.
1911 - The Combination folded in 1911 so they joined the Liverpool County Combination for 1911–12 season
1912 - They joined the North Wales Alliance Division 1 for the 1912–13 season
1919 - After World War 1, Connah's Quay and Shotton United continue in the North Wales Alliance Division 1
1920 - Connah's Quay and Shotton United join the Cheshire County League for their 1st spell in the league
1922 - They join the Welsh National League Division One North
1929 - They apply to join the Football League, ultimately unsuccessful and instead join the Cheshire County League again
1931 - In November they resigned from the 1931-32 Cheshire League and folded

== Colours ==
The club originally wore maroon jerseys and white shorts. After the First World War, the club's colours were blue and white, originally in striped shirts and white shorts, the shirts later changing to plain blue before reverting to stripes, with blue shorts.

== Ground ==
The club originally played at the Halfway Ground. In 1928, the club moved to Dee Park in Shotton, taking the old grandstand with it.

== See also ==
- Connah's Quay Nomads F.C.: the present day club
