= Llandyrnog & District Summer League =

Football league in Wales

- Founded: 1927
- Country: Wales
- Divisions: 1
- Number of clubs: 12
- Level on pyramid: N/A
- Domestic cup(s): Bridson and Evans Memorial Shield
- Current champions: Llangynhafal (2026)
- Most championships: Llandyrnog
- Website: https://www.summerfootball.co.uk/

The Llandyrnog & District Village Clubs Summer Football League is a football league in Wales, mostly covering rural areas in the Vale of Clwyd. The league is not part of the Welsh football league system and is not affiliated with the FAW. Teams in the league also compete for the Bridson and Evans Memorial Shield.

Matches are played from April to July.

== History ==
The league was founded in early 1927, to allow farm workers to play football on summer evenings. Their long hours, including work on weekends, meant they could not play in other leagues. Its five founding members were Bodfari, Llandyrnog, Llanrhaeadr, Trefnant, and Tremeirchion. Other teams have joined the league since then, such as Bodelwyddan, Cefn Meiriadog, Henllan, Llanfair DC and Rhewl. Llandyrnog and Llanrhaeadr are the only teams to have played in every season of the league since it was founded.

The league rules allow a maximum of 14 clubs, which can only have players from an area around where the club is based.

== Member clubs for 2026 season ==
- Caerwys
- Cefn Meiriadog
- Clawddnewydd
- Henllan
- Llandyrnog
- Llanfair DC
- Llangynhafal
- Llanrhaeadr
- Nantglyn
- Rhewl
- Trefnant
- Ysceifiog

== Champions ==
The following is sourced from the Denbighshire Free Press (SUMMER LEAGUE - The winners) unless otherwise stated.

- 1927: – Trefnant
- 1928: – Trefnant
- 1929: – Trefnant
- 1930: – Bodelwyddan
- 1931: – Trefnant
- 1932: – Rhewl
- 1933: – Henllan
- 1934: – Trefnant
- 1935: – Henllan
- 1936: – Trefnant
- 1937: – Llanrhaeadr
- 1938: – Tremeirchion
- 1939: – Tremeirchion
- 1940: – cancelled
- 1941: – cancelled
- 1942: – cancelled
- 1943: – cancelled
- 1944: – cancelled
- 1945: – cancelled
- 1946: – Trefnant
- 1947: – Trefnant
- 1948: – Trefnant
- 1949: – Llanrhaeadr
- 1950: – Llandyrnog
- 1951: – Henllan
- 1952: – Trefnant
- 1953: – Tremeirchion
- 1954: – Llandyrnog
- 1955: – Llanrhaeadr
- 1956: – Rhewl
- 1957: – Llandyrnog
- 1958: – Henllan
- 1959: – Llanrhaeadr
- 1960: – Bodfari
- 1961: – Bodfari
- 1962: – Bodfari
- 1963: – Henllan
- 1964: – Llandyrnog
- 1965: – Henllan
- 1966: – Llanrhaeadr
- 1967: – Cefn Meiriadog
- 1968: – Llanrhaeadr
- 1969: – Rhewl
- 1970: – Cefn Meiriadog
- 1971: – Caerwys
- 1972: – Rhewl
- 1973: – Caerwys
- 1974: – Henllan
- 1975: – Trefnant
- 1976: – Trefnant
- 1977: – Llandyrnog
- 1978: – Llandyrnog
- 1979: – Llandyrnog
- 1980: – Llandyrnog
- 1981: – Llandyrnog
- 1982: – Llandyrnog
- 1983: – Llandyrnog
- 1984: – Llandyrnog
- 1985: – Llandyrnog
- 1986: – Rhewl
- 1987: – Llandyrnog
- 1988: – Trefnant
- 1989: – Llanfair DC
- 1990: – Cefn Meiriadog
- 1991: – Llandyrnog
- 1992: – Llanfair DC
- 1993: – Cefn Meiriadog
- 1994: – Rhewl
- 1995: – Rhewl
- 1996: – Cefn Meiriadog
- 1997: – Llangynhafal
- 1998: – Llangynhafal
- 1999: – Llanfair DC
- 2000: – Llandyrnog
- 2001: – Llangynhafal
- 2002: – Llanrhaeadr
- 2003: – Rhewl
- 2004: – Llanrhaeadr
- 2005: – Nantglyn
- 2006: – Nantglyn
- 2007: – Clawddnewydd
- 2008: – Ysceifiog
- 2009: – Clawddnewydd
- 2010: – Cefn Meiriadog
- 2011: – Llandyrnog
- 2012: – Cefn Meiriadog
- 2013: – Llanrhaeadr
- 2014: – Cefn Meiriadog
- 2015: – Llandyrnog
- 2016: – Henllan
- 2017: – Henllan
- 2018: – Cefn Meiriadog
- 2019: – Llangynhafal
- 2020: – cancelled
- 2021: – cancelled
- 2022: – Cefn Meiriadog
- 2023: – Llanrhaeadr
- 2024: – Llanrhaeadr
- 2025: – Cefn Meiriadog
- 2026: – Llangynhafal
