= Henllan F.C. =

Football club based in Denbighshire

Henllan
- Full name: Henllan Football Club
- Ground: Top Park, Henllan
- League: North Wales Coast East Division One
- 2025–26: North Wales Coast East One, 6th of 9
- Website: henllanfootballclub.co.uk
Home colours	Away colours

Henllan Football Club is a Welsh football club based in Henllan, Denbighshire. They currently play in the North Wales Coast East Division One and the Llandyrnog & District Summer League.

== History ==
The first Henllan club was formed in 1905, and played in the Rhyl & District League from 1919 to 1921.

Henllan FC was formed in 1930. They joined the Llandyrnog & District Summer League in 1933 and won the league title at the first attempt, with an unbeaten record of 7 wins and 7 draws in 14 matches. In 1934 they fell to mid-table but regained the league title the following year. After World War II Henllan initially struggled, but went on to win two league titles, the North Wales Times Shield, and the Chandler Cup in the 1950s. In the 1960s and 1970s they won three more league titles and two more shields.

In 2017 Henllan formed a winter league team and entered the Vale of Clwyd and Conwy Football League. In 2020 they were announced as members of the newly formed North Wales Coast East Football League, and were placed into Division One.

In 2024 the club formed a women's team, joining the North Wales Women's Football League. In their first season they reached the final of the Betty Pickering Shield, as well as finishing 3rd in the league, scoring 86 goals in their 12 league games. Across all competitions, 17-year-old Beth Roberts scored 53 goals in 19 appearances, the highest total in North Wales women's football since 2011–12.

== Honours ==
- Llandyrnog & District Summer League - Champions: 1933, 1935, 1951, 1958, 1963, 1965, 1974, 2016, 2017
- North Wales Times Shield - Winners: 1957, 1964, 1973, 2012, 2017, 2022, 2023
- Chandler Cup - Winners: 1950
