= Vale of Conwy Football League =

- Founded: 1922
- Folded: 2002
- Country: Wales
- Last champions: Llanfairfechan Town (2001–02)
- Most championships: Machno United (12 titles)

The Vale of Conwy Football League (also known as the Vale of Conway Football League) was a football league in North Wales. It was formed in 1922 and ceased operating at the end of the 2001–02 season.

== History ==
The league was formed in 1922 and ran for three seasons before disappearing from newspaper coverage. It restarted for the 1929–30 season and ran until the end of the 2001–02 season, with the exception of the period of the Second World War, when football competitions were suspended.

== League champions ==
=== 1920s ===
- 1922–23: – Penmaenmawr reserves
- 1923–24: – Penmaen Celts
- 1924–25: – Dolgarrog United
- 1929–30: – Conway Casuals

=== 1930s ===
- 1930–31: – Craigydon
- 1931–32: – Craigydon
- 1932–33: – Penrhyn United
- 1933–34: – Penrhyn United
- 1934–35: – Llanrwst Town
- 1935–36: – Conwy Borough
- 1936–37: – Llanrwst Town
- 1937–38: – Llanrwst Town
- 1938–39: – Penmaenmawr
- 1939–40: – Penmaenmawr

=== 1940s ===
- 1940–41: – Competition suspended - World War Two
- 1941–42: – Competition suspended - World War Two
- 1942–43: – Competition suspended - World War Two
- 1943–44: – Competition suspended - World War Two
- 1944–45: – Competition suspended - World War Two
- 1945–46: – Llanddulas
- 1946–47: – Conway
- 1947–48: – Llanrwst Town
- 1948–49: – Machno United
- 1949–50: – Machno United

=== 1950s ===
- 1950–51: – Conway Casuals
- 1951–52: – Llandudno reserves
- 1952–53: – Trefriw Spa
- 1953–54: – Conway Casuals
- 1954–55: – Llandudno VC
- 1955–56: – Trefriw Spa
- 1956–57: – Gwydyr Rovers
- 1957–58: – Gwydyr Rovers
- 1958–59: – Mochdre Youth
- 1959–60: – Gwydyr Rovers

=== 1960s ===
- 1960–61 – Machno United
- 1961–62 – Dolwyddelan
- 1962–63 – Dolwyddelan
- 1963–64 – Colwyn Bay reserves
- 1964–65 – Colwyn Bay reserves
- 1965–66 – Llandudno reserves
- 1966–67 – Machno United
- 1967–68 – Machno United
- 1968–69 – Machno United
- 1969–70 – Llandudno Amateurs

=== 1970s ===
- 1970–71 – Dolwyddelan
- 1971–72 – Machno United
- 1972–73 – Machno United
- 1973–74 – Machno United
- 1974–75 – Llandudno Amateurs
- 1975–76 – Llandudno Amateurs
- 1976–77 – Mochdre
- 1977–78 – Llandudno Amateurs
- 1978–79 – Llandudno Amateurs
- 1979–80 – Cerrigydrudion

=== 1980s ===
- 1980–81 – Llanrwst Town
- 1981–82 – Rhos United
- 1982–83 – Llanrwst Town
- 1983–84 – Mochdre
- 1984–85 – Mochdre
- 1985–86 – Machno United
- 1986–87 – Hotpoint SC Llandudno Junction
- 1987–88 – Blaenau Amateurs
- 1988–89 – Llanfairfechan Town
- 1989–90 – Penmaenmawr Phoenix

=== 1990s ===
- 1990–91 – Colwyn Bay reserves
- 1991–92 – Machno United
- 1992–93 – Mochdre
- 1993–94 – CPD Bro Cernyw
- 1994–95 – Machno United
- 1995–96 – Llandudno reserves
- 1996–97 – Llansannan
- 1997–98 – Glan Conway
- 1998–99 – Blaenau Amateurs
- 1999–2000 – Betws y Coed

=== 2000s ===
- 2000–01 – CPD Bro Cernyw
- 2001–02 – Llanfairfechan Town
