= Llandudno Amateurs F.C. =

Former association football club in Wales

Llandudno Amateurs 1901–1913
- Full name: Llandudno Amateurs Football Club
- Nickname: Cormorants
- Founded: 1901
- Dissolved: 1913
- Ground: Council Ground, Llandudno
- 1911–12: North Wales Coast League Division 1 (7th)

Llandudno Amateurs were a football club from Llandudno who existed during the Edwardian era. The club were first mentioned in 1901 following the demise of Llandudno Swifts. They competed in the North Wales Coast League, Welsh Cup, and North Wales Coast Cup. This incarnation of the club was last mentioned in 1913.

== Colours ==
Pre November 1903	November 1903	1907–1909

== Seasons ==
Season	League	Played	Won	Drew	Lost	Points	Position	Remarks
1903–04	North Wales Coast League Division 1	16	8	1	7	17	5	
1904–05	North Wales Coast League Division 1	14	6	2	6	14	4	
1905–06	North Wales Coast League Division 1	12	4	2	6	10	5	
1906–07	North Wales Coast League Division 1	12	6	2	4	14	2	
1906–07	North Wales Coast League Division 2	10	2	4	4	8	8	Reserves
1907–08	North Wales Coast League Division 1	20	9	3	8	21	5	
1908–09	North Wales Coast League Division 1	20	10	4	6	24	3	
1909–10	North Wales Coast League Division 1	18	7	4	7	16	6	2 Points Deducted
1909–10	North Wales Coast League Division 2	12	3	1	8	7	7	Reserves
1910–11	North Wales Coast League Division 1	18	12	5	1	29	1	
1910–11	North Wales Coast League Division 2	16	5	1	10	11	7	Reserves
1911–12	North Wales Coast League Division 1	20	7	5	8	19	7	

== Cup history ==
Season	Competition	Round	Opposition	Score	Remarks
1903–04	North Wales Coast Senior Cup	Semi-final	Colwyn Bay	2–1	Played at Llanrwst
1903–04	North Wales Coast Senior Cup	Final	Bangor	2–1	Played at Pwllheli
1904–05	Welsh Cup	Bye to Third Round			
1904–05	Welsh Cup	Third round	Bangor	2–4	
1906–07	North Wales Coast Senior Cup	Final	Holyhead Swifts	1–1	Played at Bangor
1906–07	North Wales Coast Senior Cup	Final Replay	Holyhead Swifts	1–1	Played at Bangor. Crowd 2,000.
1906–07	North Wales Coast Senior Cup	Final Second Replay	Holyhead Swifts	0–3	Played at Bangor
1908–09	Welsh Cup	First round	Bangor	0–3	
1909–10	Welsh Cup	Preliminary Round	Carnarvon United	0–2	
1910–11	Welsh Cup	First round	Rhyl	1–0	
1910–11	Welsh Cup	Second round	Carnarvon United	2–2	
1910–11	Welsh Cup	Second round Replay	Carnarvon United	2–2	
1910–11	Welsh Cup	Second round Second Replay	Carnarvon United	5–2	
1910–11	Welsh Cup	Third round	Bangor	1–3	
1911–12	Welsh Cup	Preliminary Round	Bangor	5–2	
1911–12	Welsh Cup	First round	Llandudno Junction Temperane	1–1	
1911–12	Welsh Cup	First round Replay	Llandudno Junction Temperane	4–1	
1911–12	Welsh Cup	Second round	Holyhead Swifts	2–2	
1911–12	Welsh Cup	Second round Replay	Holyhead Swifts	0–0	
1911–12	Welsh Cup	Second round Second Replay	Holyhead Swifts	2–1	
1911–12	Welsh Cup	Third round	Whitchurch	1–0	
1911–12	Welsh Cup	Fourth round	Pontypridd	0–2	
1912–13	Welsh Cup	Preliminary Round	Carnarvon United	0–4	
1912–13	Welsh Cup	Preliminary Round Replay	Carnarvon United	2–2	
1912–13	Welsh Cup	Preliminary Round Second Replay	Carnarvon United	2–3	

== Honours ==
=== League ===
- North Wales Coast League Division 1

Winners : 1911
Runners-up : 1907

=== Cup ===
- North Wales Coast Senior Cup

Winners : 1904
Runners-up : 1907
