= Crozzy FC =

Football club based in Llandudno Junction

- Full name: Crozzy Football Club
- Founded: 2025
- Ground: The Oval (Llandudno)
- League: North Wales Coast East Division One
Home colours	Away colours

Crozzy FC is a Welsh football club based in Llandudno Junction. They play in the North Wales Coast East Division One.

== History ==
The club was originally known as FC Mally, and played in the Rhyl & District Sunday League. Their first honour came in 2013, finishing runners-up in the Premier Cup. Then in the next two seasons they won the quadruple, winning all trophies available to them. However the club folded in 2015.

In 2016 the club was reformed as Crozzy, and won the Premier Cup in their first season after reforming. Then in 2017 they reverted to their original name, and won a treble in the 2017–18 season before their third quadruple came in 2018–19.

In 2021–22 they won another treble, but failed to win the league title in 2022–23. They also lost in the abandoned NWCFA Sunday Challenge Cup final against Y Clwb. In 2023 the Rhyl & District Sunday League folded, and as a result the club did as well.

A new Crozzy club was formed in 2025, joining the North Wales Coast East Football League Division One.

== Honours ==
=== FC Mally ===
- Rhyl & District Sunday League - Champions: 2013–14, 2014–15, 2017–18, 2018–19, 2021–22
- NWCFA Sunday Challenge Cup - Winners: 2013–14, 2014–15, 2017–18, 2018–19, 2021–22
- Lee Jones Cup - Winners: 2013–14, 2014–15, 2017–18, 2018–19
- Premier Cup - Winners: 2013–14, 2014–15, 2018–19
- Premier Cup - Runners-up: 2012–13, 2017–18, 2021–22

=== Crozzy FC ===
- Premier Cup - Winners: 2016–17
