= North Wales Coast League =

- Founded: 1893; 1933 (re-founded)
- First season: 1893–94; 1933–34 (re-founded)
- Folded: 1921; 1935 (dissolved)
- Country: Wales
- Divisions: 2 (1905–06 through 1920–21)
- Number of clubs: 12 (Division 1); 14 (Division 2) (1920–21)
- Domestic cup: Welsh Cup
- League cup: North Wales Coast Senior Cup
- Last champions: Llanfairfechan (1934–35)
- Most championships: Bangor City (5 times + 2 with Reserves)^{[1]}

The North Wales Coast League was a North Walian association football league that existed from 1893 until 1921. After the Welsh Senior League, which started in 1890, it was the second association football league formed in North Wales. There was an attempt to restart the league in 1930, which failed, followed by another restart in 1933, which lasted for two seasons. Seven teams from across the North Wales coast contested in the first season, with the number of clubs increasing to 26 in 1920, playing over two divisions.

== History ==
=== Welsh National League ===
In 1921 the league was absorbed into the Welsh National League (North).

=== North Wales Football Combination ===
As well as the failed attempt to restart the league in the 1930-31 season, the North Wales Football Combination was formed in the same season, then renamed North Wales Coast League for the 1933-34 season, for two seasons. Disbanded due to the formation of the Welsh League North.

== Champions ==
Season	Winner	Runner-up
1893–94	Fflint	Llandudno Swifts
1894–95	Rhyl	Fflint
1895–96	Bangor	Fflint
1896–97	Llandudno Swifts	Bangor
1897–98	Llandudno Swifts	Rhyl Town
1898–99	Llanrwst Town	Bangor
1899–1900	Bangor	Llanrwst Town
1900–01	Bangor	Rhyl
1901–02	Carnarvon Ironopolis	Bangor
1902–03	Porthmadoc	Bangor
1903–04	Bangor	Porthmadoc
1904–05	Bangor Reserves	Porthmadoc

== 1905–21 ==
=== Division One ===
Season	Winner	Runner-up
1905–06	Bangor Reserves	Holyhead Swifts
1906–07	Holyhead Swifts	Llandudno Amateurs
1907–08	Bangor Reserves	Holyhead Swifts
1908–09	Beaumaris	Caernarfon United
1909–10	U.C.N.W. Bangor	Caernarfon United
1910–11	Llandudno Amateurs	Caernarfon United
1911–12	Caernarfon United	Bangor Reserves
1912–13	Ffestiniog Town	Caernarfon United
1913–14	Holywell United	Denbigh United
1919–20	Bangor Comrades	Bangor Railway Institute
1920–21	Holyhead Railway Institute	Holywell United

=== Division Two ===
Season	Winner	Runner-up
1905–06	Rhyl Victoria	Prestatyn Town
1906–07	Rhyl Victoria	Ruthin
1907–08	Ruthin Town	Denbigh Church Guild
1908–09	Ruthin Town	Denbigh Church Guild
1909–10	Holyhead Swifts Res.	Glasinfryn Swifts
1910–11	Glasinfryn Swifts	Llechid Swifts
1911–12	Glasinfryn Swifts	Bangor Reserves
1912–13	Tregarth	Holyhead Swifts Res.
1913–14	Bangor Railway Institute	Bangor Reserves
1919–20	Holyhead Railway Institute Res.	Abergele
1920–21	Llechid Celts	Glasinfryn Swifts

== 1933–35 ==
Season	Winner	Runner-up
1933–34	Rhyl Athletic Res.	Llanfairfechan
1934–35	Llanfairfechan	Bangor Reserves

== Notes ==
1. ^{a} Bangor City.
