= Les Davies =

Welsh footballer (born 1984)

Personal information
- Full name: Leslie Elias Davies
- Date of birth: 29 October 1984 (age 41)
- Place of birth: Bangor, Gwynedd, Wales
- Position: Forward

Team information
- Current team: Trearddur Bay

Senior career*
Years	Team	Apps	(Gls)
2002–2003	Caernarfon Town	6	(0)
2003–2005	Bangor City	49	(12)
2005–2007	Porthmadog	64	(18)
2007–2015	Bangor City	226	(76)
2015–2017	Connah's Quay Nomads	58	(16)
2017–2018	Bala Town	5	(5)
2018–2019	Bangor City		
2019	Llandudno		
2019	Aberystwyth Town	0	(0)
2019–2020	Bangor 1876	24	(27)
2020	Flint Town United	4	(0)
2020–2023	Bangor 1876	60+	(55)
2023–	Trearddur Bay	9	(4)

International career
- Wales U18
- Wales U21
- Wales U23
- * Club domestic league appearances and goals as of 11:27, 9 December 2019 (UTC)

Leslie Elias Davies (born 29 October 1984) is a Welsh footballer who plays as a striker for Trearddur Bay.

== Career ==
Davies began his career with Caernarfon Town before signing for Bangor City. During his time with Bangor, Davies was dubbed "Bangor's Number 9", and was a popular figure with the fans, winning the BCFCSA Player of the Season for two successive years, whilst also getting voted into the team of the season by the league's managers in 2011–12.

Between 2005 and 2007, Davies played for Porthmadog, scoring 18 goals before returning to Bangor.

During his second spell with Bangor, Davies was nominated for the UEFA Player of the Year award in July 2012, after receiving the required single nomination from journalist Dave Jones of The Daily Post. On 8 August 2015, Bangor City announced that Davies had left the club to sign for Connah's Quay Nomads, and this was confirmed by The Nomads on Monday 10 August.

He made 79 competitive appearances for the Nomads, scoring 24 goals, before moving to Bala Town in May 2017.

Davies returned to Bangor for a third spell in May 2018. In January 2019, he signed for Llandudno.

In May 2019, Davies signed for Aberystwyth Town for the 2019–20 season.

Davies left Aberystwyth in June 2019, before the season started to sign for Bangor City phoenix club Bangor 1876.

== International career ==
Davies has represented Wales at U18, U21 level and also as a semi-professional for their U23 team.

== Style of play ==
Davies is well known for his strength and has earned the nickname "The Truck" as a result.
