= Bryan Griffiths (footballer, born 1939) =

English footballer and manager

Personal information
- Date of birth: 21 November 1938 (age 87)
- Place of birth: Litherland, England
- Position: Full-back

Senior career*
| Years | Team | Apps | (Gls) |
| 1958–1959 | Everton | 2 | (0) |
| 1960–1963 | Southport | 117 | (1) |
| 1968–1971 | Formby | | |

Managerial career
- 1967–80: Formby
- 1980–83: Burscough
- 1983–84: South Liverpool
- 1984–87: Southport
- 1988–89: Mossley
- 1989–93: Morecambe
- 1994: Witton Albion
- 1996: Bangor City
- 1997–????: Chorley
- 2000–2001: Kendal Town
- 2002: Congleton Town
- 2002–????: Rossendale United
- * Club domestic league appearances and goals

Bryan Griffiths (born 21 November 1938) is a former professional footballer who played as a defender in the Football League and later had an extensive career as manager of Non-League football clubs.

== Playing career ==
As a schoolboy Griffiths played as a centre forward, playing for the Forefield Lane Junior School team in Crosby, Merseyside. He moved up to Crosby County Secondary School, playing for their intermediate team before going to Bootle Technical College aged 12. Whilst there he played for Bootle Schoolboys, and during this spell he transferred from centre forward to full back, the position he would make his own for the rest of his career. He was so impressive playing there that he was picked for the Lancashire County Schoolboys side, where he was spotted by Everton scouts who drafted him into their Youth squad in May 1954.

Signing professional forms at 17, and following tours in Ireland and Holland, he made his first team debut against Preston North End at Deepdale aged 19. Everton lost 3–2, and the following week were thrashed 6–1 by Arsenal.

Soon afterwards Everton let Griffiths go and in June 1960 Southport's player-manager, ex-Evertonian Wally Fielding, signed him to the Fourth Division club. Nicknamed 'Yogi' during his time with the Sandgrounders thanks to his ultra-short crewcut, Griffiths played 97 consecutive games, racking up 117 appearances and one goal before receiving a cartilage injury at Rochdale in March 1963 that all but ended his professional career aged just 23.

== Management career ==
=== Formby ===
After taking over football for Ainsdale St John's boys' club in Southport, in the mid 1960s Trevor Hitchen asked Griffiths to manage Formby. His impact was immediate, winning the Liverpool FA Challenge Cup in 1967–68. History then stepped in to give his side a leg up. The Northern Premier League was formed, attracting many of the stronger sides from lower leagues such as the Lancashire Combination who, in turn, replenished their ranks from leagues further down the football pyramid. In August 1968, after thirty years in the Liverpool County Combination, Formby moved up to the Lancashire Combination and joined national competitions for the first time in 20 years, entering the FA Cup and later the FA Trophy.

After just three years Formby graduated to a stronger league, the Cheshire County League in 1971. In the first season the Squirrels reached the Liverpool Non-League Senior Cup final. After a feet-finding first year's league campaign, the next three seasons had top ten finishes and record campaigns in the FA Cup and FA Trophy that still stand. In 1978 Formby defeated two League sides to become the first non-league side to win the Liverpool Senior Cup since 1897.

Griffiths picked himself as a player for the first few years at Formby, including playing a match in goal, but the habit waned as he aged and the strength of his squad increased. Nonetheless he is remembered as being a very fit and participative manager in training even late in his Formby tenure at the turn of the 1980s.

=== Burscough ===
Griffiths left Formby in October 1980. His next managerial role was at Burscough, taking them to the inaugural North West Counties Football League title in 1982–83.

=== South Liverpool ===
From there he graduated to Northern Premier League side South Liverpool, winning a treble of the Lancashire Junior Cup, the Northern Premier League Challenge Cup and most impressively the Liverpool Senior Cup in 1983–84.

=== Southport ===
In December 1984 Griffiths returned to Southport, now in the Northern Premier League, as manager, a move long desired by fans. He appointed as his assistant a man starting out on his managerial career, Dave Jones, who would go on to be boss of Cardiff City and Sheffield Wednesday. They took Southport to the quarter-finals of the FA Trophy and the First Round Proper of the FA Cup.

=== Mossley ===
In November 1987 the duo left Haig Avenue, taking up identical roles in October 1988 at Mossley, who were then bottom of the Northern Premier League. Thirteen months and four trophies later, Griffiths had stabilised them in mid-table when he was asked to halve his wages.

=== Morecambe ===
Griffiths promptly moved to Morecambe in December 1989, taking Dave Jones with him again, though the latter left part way into Griffiths' four-year tenure. By the end of the first season the team had reached the final of the Lancashire ATS Cup. In 1991–92 they got to the first round of the FA Cup (losing to Hull City) and second round of the FA Trophy (losing to eventual winners Colchester United). The season finished on what was to prove to be Griffiths' high point at Morecambe, winning the two-legged final of the League Presidents Cup, beating Stalybridge Celtic 3–2 on aggregate.

In 1992–93 once again they got to the second round of the FA Trophy, taking Conference side Wycombe Wanderers to a replay. After an indifferent start to 1993–94 Griffiths was sacked by the board in December 1993 after a little over four years in the post.

=== Other clubs ===
After leaving Morecambe in December 1993 he had spells with Bangor City, Witton Albion, Chorley, Kendal Town, Congleton Town and Rossendale United before retiring from the game.
