= Abergele F.C. =

Football club based in Abergele

Abergele
- Full name: Abergele Football Club
- Founded: 2015
- Dissolved: 2024
- Ground: Eirias Park 3G
- 2023–24: North Wales Coast East Premier Division, 11th of 13
Home colours	Away colours

Abergele Football Club was a Welsh football club based in Abergele, Conwy County Borough. The team most recently played in the North Wales Coast East Football League Premier Division.

== History ==
Abergele Football Club was founded in 2015, and joined the Vale of Clwyd and Conwy Football League.

In 2016–17 they beat Llannefydd to win the President's Cup.

In 2018–19 they lost in the finals of the Premier Cup and the President's Cup, both to Llandudno Athletic.

In 2020 the club were named as members of the newly-formed North Wales Coast East Football League, and were placed into Division One. In the first season after the COVID-19 pandemic (2021–22) they were champions of Division One. They repeated this success in the following season, also winning the NWCFA Junior Cup.

The club moved from Dinorben Field to Eirias Park in Colwyn Bay in 2023, due to ground requirements to be promoted to the fourth tier of Welsh football. The previous season they had been denied promotion due to insufficient facilities.

The club has competed in the Welsh Cup, most recently in 2023–24, where they lost to Y Glannau.

They left the North Wales Coast East Football League in 2024, hoping to return for 2025–26. However they did not appear in the league for the 2025–26 season.

== Honours ==
- North Wales Coast East Football League Division One - Champions: 2021–22, 2022–23
- NWCFA Junior Cup - Winners: 2022–23
- REM Jones Cup - Winners: 2022–23
- Premier Cup - Runners-up: 2018–19
- President's Cup - Winners: 2016–17
- President's Cup - Runners-up: 2018–19
