= Kinmel Bay F.C. =

Association football club in Wales

Kinmel Bay
- Full name: Kinmel Bay Football Club
- Founded: 2002
- Ground: Y Morfa Leisure Centre
- Capacity: 50 seated
- Chairman: Frank Standing
- Manager: Andy Thomas and Leon Field
- League: North Wales Coast East Premier Division
- 2025–26: North Wales Coast East Premier Division, 2nd of 12
- Website: https://www.pitchero.com/clubs/kinmelbayfootballclub2

Kinmel Bay Football Club is a Welsh football team based in Kinmel Bay, in Conwy County Borough, north-east Wales. The team play in the North Wales Coast East Premier Division.

== History ==
The club was established in 2002 by Bill Darwin and his sister, Anne Darwin.

In the 2017–18 season the club were champions of the Vale of Clwyd and Conwy Football League Premier Division at the first attempt and were promoted to the Welsh Alliance League Division Two. After the FAW league pyramid restructure in 2019–20 the club did not meet the new criteria set out by the FAW and returned to the North Wales Coast East Premier Division.

The club's reserve team, were moved from the FAW Reserve League to the newly formed North Wales Coast Reserve League and in the 2023–24 season they moved into the new North Wales Coast Development League. In the 2025–26 season they won the East Division scoring 128 goals in 22 games and losing only two games all season.

Kinmel Bay also has a woman’s team who compete in the North Wales coast Llandudno Kia Woman’s League and in the 2025–26 season finished in second position under the management of Naomi Oakley.

Currently Kinmel Bay Football Club have a number of teams in both boys and girls ages from under-5s to under-16s who all compete in Rhyl and District Junior League and North Wales Girls Football League.

== Honours ==
- North Wales Coast East Football League Premier Division – Runners-up: 2025–26
- Vale of Clwyd and Conwy Football League Premier Division – Champions: 2017–18
- Cookson Cup – Winners: 2023–24
- Cookson Cup – Runners-up: 2025–26
