= Bangor City F.C. =

Association football club in Bangor, Wales

Bangor City
- Full name: Bangor City Football Club; Clwb Pêl-droed Dinas Bangor
- Nickname: The Citizens
- Founded: 1876; 150 years ago (as Bangor Football Club)
- Dissolved: 5 January 2025; 21 months ago
- 2021–22: Cymru North, (resigned from league)
Home colours	Away colours

Bangor City Football Club (Welsh: Clwb Pêl-droed Dinas Bangor) was a Welsh football club from the City of Bangor, Gwynedd.

Founded in 1876, Bangor City were founder members of the North Wales Coast League, the Welsh National League, the North Wales Combination, the Welsh National League (North), the Northern Premier League, the Alliance Premier League and the League of Wales, as well as playing in the inaugural Welsh Cup. The team won the Welsh Cup eight times and the Welsh Premier League three times, as well as taking part in European competitions.

The club's home colours were traditionally royal blue shirts, royal blue shorts and royal blue socks, although over the years home colours were varied to include royal blue and yellow and scarlet and royal blue.

The club last played during the 2021–22 season in the Cymru North the second level of the Welsh football league system. On 30 November 2021 they were suspended from any football activity due to non-payment of staff wages. On 18 February 2022 the club announced they had withdrawn from the league and the Football Association of Wales confirmed the club's results from the league that season have been expunged. The club subsequently failed to apply for tier 2 or tier 3 licences, leaving them unable to play in any Football Association of Wales league for the 2022–23 season.

== History ==
=== Pre-League of Wales era (1876–1992) ===
Bangor City F.C. was one of Wales' older football clubs, and has played in European football, the English pyramid system and the Cymru Premier.

The club was a founding member of the North Wales Coast League in 1893, the Welsh National League in 1921, the North Wales Combination in 1930, the Welsh League North in 1935, the Northern Premier League in 1968, the Alliance Premier League (now National League) in 1979, and in 1992 the League of Wales.

In 1947 and 1950 Bangor challenged for election to the football leagues Third Division North yet failed on each occasion. In the 1961–62 season, they won the Welsh Cup, and consequently entered in the European Cup Winners' Cup for the first time. In the first round, they were drawn against the Italian Cup winners, Napoli. In the first leg, played at Farrar Road, Bangor won 2–0; three weeks later, in front of a crowd of 80,000 in Naples, the result was 3–1 in Napoli's favour. A playoff had to be played, at Arsenal's Highbury Stadium, in London and AS Napoli won 2–1.

At the end of 1977–78 when Southport was relegated from the English Football League Fourth Division, Bangor City, Boston United and Wigan Athletic were considered for promotion in its place. Due to Wigan Athletic having installed crush barriers, they were elected ahead of Bangor and Boston in the same year Bangor was invited to the 1977–78 Anglo-Italian Cup.

In 1979–80 Bangor City was invited to compete in the Alliance Premier League, which would become the English game's de facto fifth division.

On 12 May 1984 they became the first Welsh club to play at Wembley since Cardiff in 1927, when reaching the FA Trophy final against Northwich Victoria. The match finished 1–1. The replay was played in Stoke's Victoria Ground and Bangor lost 2–1.

In 1985 the club returned to European football in the European Cup Winners' Cup, in the first round drawn against the Norwegian Football Cup winners, Fredrikstad. The first leg in Norway was a 1–1 draw, while the return leg in Bangor was a 0–0 draw, resulting in Bangor progressing to the second round on the "away goals rule", where the club was drawn against the Spanish side Atlético Madrid. The first leg in Bangor was won 2–0 by Atlético. In the return leg in Madrid, Bangor lost 1–0.

The captain of the club during that season was midfielder Mark Palios, who later became chief executive of the English Football Association during 2004–05.

=== Early League of Wales years (1992–2007) ===
In 1992 the club left the English football pyramid to join the new national League of Wales. In the second season the club were league champions and as champions, entered the UEFA Cup. They were drawn against the Icelandic champions, IA Akranes. Akranes won the tie 4–1.

In 1995 the club retained the League of Wales championship and this time drew the Polish runners-up Widzew Łódź in the preliminary round of the UEFA Cup. Łódź triumphed over City, winning 4–0 in Bangor and 1–0 in Łódź.

In 1998 the club were back in the Cup Winners' Cup, having won the Welsh Cup under the management of Graeme Sharp. Between winning the Welsh Cup and playing their opponents, FC Haka, the manager and most of the team had left, so new manager John King had to put together a completely new side, a week before the start of the Welsh football season (and three-quarters of the way through the Finnish football season). Bangor were beaten 3–0 on aggregate. Bangor city qualified for the 1997–98 FAW Premier Cup but were knocked out by Newtown in the quarter finals

In 2006 the club made it to the Welsh Cup final where they were beaten by Rhyl 2–0 at Wrexham's Racecourse Ground.

=== Powell years (2007–2016) ===
The club won back the Welsh Cup in 2008 defeating Llanelli 4–2 after extra time at Latham Park, Newtown. Victory in the Welsh Cup meant that Bangor had again qualified for Europe and in the following season's UEFA Cup they were drawn to face FC Midtjylland of Denmark. The tie saw Bangor beaten 10–1 on aggregate.

Bangor ended the 2008–09 season with yet more silverware as they retained the Welsh Cup by defeating Aberystwyth Town 2–0 in a match held at Parc y Scarlets, Llanelli.

The 2008–09 Welsh Cup success meant that Bangor participated in the inaugural Europa League competition at the start of the 2009–10 season. They were drawn to face Honka Espoo in the second qualifying round and were eliminated at the first hurdle losing 3–0 on aggregate.

Bangor made it three Welsh Cup wins in a row in 2009–10 with a 3–2 success against Port Talbot in the Welsh Cup Final, again held at Llanelli.

In the 2010–11 Europa League campaign, Bangor City were drawn against Honka Espoo. They overcame the Finnish side in the Europa League second qualifying round with a 3–2 aggregate scoreline. Bangor succumbed to Portuguese side Marítimo in the third qualifying round. Marítimo won 10–3 on aggregate.

The 2010–11 season marked a significant change in the set-up of the Welsh Premiership, with Bangor one of the 12 sides (down from 18) contesting the championship. They won their opening 15 games of the season, eventually winning their first league title in 16 years on the final day of the season. This was achieved by beating TNS, 1–0.

By winning their competitive league, they were involved in the 2011–12 Champions League campaign. Bangor City were against HJK Helsinki in the second qualifying round but lost 3–0 at home. In the away fixture, Bangor City were beaten 10–0 in the game and 13–0 on aggregate. Bangor finished second in 2011–12's Welsh Premiership, keeping in contention for the title until the final game of the season, a decider against TNS who won the league.

In July 2012 Bangor City forward Les Davies made the 32-man longlist for UEFA's best player in Europe award.

2012–13 began with a 0–0 home draw against Moldovan side FC Zimbru Chisnau in the first leg of the UEFA Europa League, first qualifying round. The Citizens lost the away leg 2–1 to bow out. City finishing third in the league, losing the Welsh Cup Final 3–1 after extra time to Prestatyn Town and then being defeated days later in the European playoffs by Bala Town.

Bangor finished fourth in 2013–14. The team did qualify for 2014–15 Europa League but lost 8–0 on aggregate to Icelandic side Stjarnan. It heralded a slide during which the side was in real danger of relegation for much of the season. The team stayed up in tenth position. 2015–16 was another struggle for the blues, who ended up in ninth place.

In June 2016 it was announced that a Cheshire-based consortium was to take over, promising large investment in the team, plus ground improvements.

On 25 July 2016 Powell was sacked, according to a statement released by the club.

=== The Vaughan era (2016–2019) ===
In August 2016 Andy Legg was appointed manager of the club. His departure in November 2016 due to his inability to commit to a full-time contract paved the way for Ian Dawes. However, with Welsh Premiership licensing rules stating that every club's head coach/manager must have, or be in the process of attaining, the UEFA Pro Coaching Licence and in the absence of such a qualification, Dawes was gone by March 2017. Gary Taylor-Fletcher then became player-manager. The club qualified via the playoffs for the Europa League under Fletcher's guidance with a 1–0 win at Nantporth against Cardiff Met.

In May 2017, Kevin Nicholson was named as manager with Gary Taylor-Fletcher as assistant. Nicholson holds the UEFA Pro licence. The club qualified automatically for the Europa League for the second successive season, finishing second under Nicholson's guidance as well as being beaten in the semi-final of the Welsh Cup.

In 2016 a company called VSM (Vaughan Sports Management), which became the main shirt sponsors of the club, took over the club. Although convicted criminal Stephen Vaughan Sr. was present at the launch of the new ownership, the new chairman Ivor Jenkins insisted that Vaughan – who is banned from being a company director – was not involved with running the club. Fellow criminal and ex-professional, Stephen Vaughan Jr., was later appointed as Director of Football and a coach at the club.

On 26 April 2018 the FAW Club Licensing Appeals Body decided to revoke the club's Tier 1 and UEFA license due to not meeting financial criteria meaning that they would automatically drop down to the second level of Welsh football the next season, despite a second-placed finish in the Welsh Premier League, and would not be able to compete for a place in the following season's Europa League.

In June 2018 Her Majesty's Revenue and Customs issued up a second winding up petition against the club. This was later dismissed as the tax owed had been paid, albeit late.

In October 2018 the club' auditors, the accountancy firm Salisbury resigned, with a public letter citing 11 points of concern in relation to how the club's owners were managing the club's financial affairs. These concerns included gaps in the clubs' accounts, missing financial documents and around a lack adequate documentation received in relation to cash shares totalling £258,000. The BBC reported that "Those concerns relate to the transfer of 25,800 shares to the company Vaughan Sports Management Ltd, a move which gave the firm significant control of the club".

In March 2019, Vaughan Jnr returned to the club as chairman, having formerly been both Director of Football and interim Manager at the club.

In May 2019 the club were found in breach of various league and FAW regulations by the Football Association of Wales (FAW), fined and docked 42 points from their 2018–19 Cymru Alliance points total. The club had until 29 May 2019 to appeal against these findings. Had the appeal been unsuccessful the club would have been relegated to Tier 3 of the Welsh league structure for the 2019–20 season. The club was also left facing a transfer embargo until 31 December 2019 and was facing a third winding up order from HMRC over further unpaid tax. The club and the FAW confirmed that an appeal had been lodged. The FAW confirmed on 5 June that the club were unable to appeal against the FAW Panel's decision to place a transfer embargo on the club as the deadline for an appeal had lapsed - and as such the club was suspended from registering any professional players (or renewing current contracts) with immediate effect up to and including 31 December 2019. The appeal date was set for the 18 June where the original points deduction was nullified. The FAW confirmed that at the meeting the appeal panel took the decision to adjourn the hearing until 24 June 2019, at which point the panel would be reconvened to consider the appeal submitted by the club. The appeal found the club guilty of most of the original charges and issued revised penalties including a reduced 21-point deduction, which meant the club remained in the second tier on goal difference.

In June 2019 it was reported that the club had avoided the winding up order by paying the outstanding debt in full. However, on 5 August of that year Bangor were suspended from playing competitive matches pending an arbitration hearing on 16 August following allegations that they fielded an ineligible player the previous season. On 16 August 2019, Bangor City won their appeal against the FAW in Birmingham and were reinstated the 21 points that were originally deducted from them in the 2018–19 Cymru Alliance season, a campaign they finished in fourth spot.

In September 2019 the club announced that VSM had sold their shares in the club to an Italian-based consortium headed up by Italian musician Domenico Serafino.

=== Domenico Serafino era (2019 onwards) ===
Domenico Serafino took over the club on 2 September 2019. His son Francesco Serafino, a Bangor player, had appealed to him to rescue the club. Serafino brought in Argentine World Cup winner Pedro Pasculli as the new manager of the team. and he was given the task of helping Bangor back into the top flight. His first win was a 2–1 victory over Rhyl in November. Pasculli had been a roommate of Diego Maradona at the 1986 World Cup in Mexico. Bangor used the January 2020 transfer window to bring in new players including former Barnsley player Hugo Colace. In April Serafino made a £5,000 donation to local hospital Ysbyty Gwynedd to help it fight the outbreak of coronavirus. The club finished the inaugural Cymru North season in fifth place in a season curtailed by the COVID-19 pandemic with the final table determined on a points-per-game basis. In June, Colace was appointed manager of the club.

The 2020–21 Cymru North season was postponed and then cancelled entirely due to Welsh government COVID-19 restrictions. In April 2021 the club was refused a Tier 1 licence on the basis of a failure to provide the club's financial accounts as part of their application along with an issue in relation to coaching qualifications. In October the club applied for a Tier 1 licence again for the 2022–23 season, Colace's contract with club was terminated after a club investigation into his conduct and the team's performance in the league that season. Colace contested the charges made against him by the club in a statement released on social media and highlighted the lack of payment of staff and players by the club's president. Maturin Ovambe was appointed the club's new head coach.

==== Suspension from all football activity ====
Concerns over unpaid wages for players and club officials were reported in the press, who noted similarities to a situation in 2020 where another club owned in Italy by Domenico Serafino, A.S. Sambenedettese had seen players not paid, the club declared bankrupt and expelled from the league. The club were summoned by the Football Association of Wales to a disciplinary hearing over the matter. The panel ruled that "all outstanding monies" must be paid within 31 days from 29 October 2021 - the club owed nearly £53,000 of unpaid wages to players and staff - with the sanction in the event of non-payment being the club would be banned "from all football related activity". On 30 November the Football Association of Wales suspended the club from all football related activity after they failed to comply with the payment of outstanding monies. As the club were suspended from football their Cymru North match versus Buckley Town on 4 December was postponed, they were fined and had three points deducted from their points total for failing to fulfil a fixture. The club's match against Prestatyn Town on 10 December was also subsequently postponed by the FAW with the club again fined with three more points deducted. The next match against Airbus was also postponed. Three more points were deducted moving them to the bottom of the Cymru North league table.

A temporary suspension of football in Wales over the festive season (due to COVID-19 Welsh government restrictions) saw the club not deducted any more points as all domestic games were postponed. On 7 January 2022 it was announced by FAW that the club had not applied for a licence to compete in the tier 2 Cymru North for the 2022–23 season, or at tier 3 level. On 14 January the club's academy announced on social media that closing with immediate effect after no support was forthcoming from the club and there had been no evidence from the FAW or the club that the situation at the club was going to improve. Upon the restart of the season in January, the club's match on 21 January against Holyhead Hotspur was also postponed with the club being docked a further three points. The club at that point only had five registered first team players. The following match was also postponed, and with another three points deducted the club now had no points at the bottom of the table.

==== Withdrawal from Cymru North ====
On 11 February the FAW announced that the club had until 19 February to pay all outstanding fines or they would be immediately expelled from the Cymru North. It also announced that in the event the club paid outstanding fines, they would have to play all subsequent league fixtures or they would also face immediate expulsion from the league. The next scheduled league match is due to take place on 25 February and the club had three players registered.

"A club competing in the second tier of Welsh professional football" and "a club with a noteworthy history. They have had some spells in the international European tournaments" was shortly afterwards advertised for sale with asking price of £1.25 million. The club was reported as Bangor City with the Daily Post noting the "eye-watering price" did not include the club's ground which was leased from the council.

On 18 February the club announced in an official statement they had informed the FAW that they had withdrawn from the Cymru North for the 2021–22 season. They also noted plans to return to play for the following season. Later that day, the FAW confirmed that the club's withdrawal had been accepted and its playing record in the league for the season had been expunged.

==== Post league withdrawal ====
The club failed to enter a team in any league for the 2022–23 season. At the start of August 2022, the club surrendered its lease on Nantporth Stadium. The club were also served with their first Gazette notice for a compulsory strike-off, the first step in Companies House striking off a company from its register.

The club was officially dissolved on 5 January 2025, following a compulsory strike-off.

== Stadium ==
=== Maes-y-Dref (1876–1919) ===
When the club was first founded, Bangor played their home games on a small field called Maes-y-Dref in the Hirael area of the city. However, visiting teams often protested about the condition of the playing area and the cramped conditions. Despite this Bangor remained at their Maes-y-Dref ground until being evicted to make way for allotments in 1919. Residential housing now stands on the site.

=== Farrar Road (1919–2011) ===
Needing to fulfill their home fixtures in the league the club used the Bangor Cricket Club ground at Farrar Road. The Farrar Road ground served as home to the club for many years afterwards and has hosted two Welsh Senior Cup Finals, in 1928 and 1953. The ground has also hosted various other domestic finals and tournaments over the years. Bangor played their last match at Farrar Road, a 5–3 win over Prestatyn Town, on 27 December 2011 before moving to Nantporth. An Asda supermarket now stands on the site.

=== Nantporth (2012–2022) ===
The club moved to a new stadium, away from the city centre, at the University's former Nantporth playing field near the Menai Strait, completed in January 2012. The first game took place on 24 January, where Bangor hosted local neighbours Caernarfon Wanderers, the score ended 6–1 to the Citizens. In July 2012 Nantporth played host to Bangor City's first European game at Bangor for 14 years; 1022 people attended to watch Bangor City take on FC Zimbru of Moldova. Starting in 2012–13 the ground became known officially as "The Book People Stadium" after a three-year deal with the literary company. The new ground hosted its first competitive international on 13 August 2013 as Wales U21 lost 5–1 to Finland U21, the first U21 international held in Bangor since 1983. Nantporth has hosted various other Welsh youth and schools matches and also gone on to host more Wales U21 games. In August 2015 Bangor University announced that a new partnership had been agreed with the club, announcing the new name of the ground as Bangor University Stadium.

It was announced in August 2022 that the club had surrendered its lease on the stadium.

== Colours ==
=== Kit evolution ===
Early years	1890's	December 1900 v Oswestry	Turn of the 20th century
20th century	20th / 21st century	2003–04	2004–07	2008–22

=== Kit manufacturers and sponsors ===
Period	Kit manufacturer	Shirt sponsor
2003–04	Teejac	Pentraeth Group
2004–05	Nike	Pentraeth Group
2005–06	Nike	JLS
2006–07	Puma	Audi
2007–08	Puma	Pentraeth Group
2008–09	Puma	Suzuki
2009–11	Puma	VW Pentraeth
2011–13	Macron	VW Pentraeth
2013–15	Macron	Kia Pentraeth
2015–16	Macron	Dafydd Hardy (Home) Anglesey Sea Zoo (Away)
2016–17	Uhlsport	Vaughan Sports Management
2017–19	Kappa	Vaughan Sports Management
2019–20	Evol	EUROGOLD
2020–22	Nike	Sudaires

== Support ==
Bangor city was a club that could consistently pull crowds of over one thousand for home and away matches every season but usually averaged under eight hundred though that still made up a large chunk of the cities population for example the 1951/52 and 1967/68 North Wales Coast Cup finals with over 9000 fans

=== Supporters' Association ===
Formed in 2001, the Bangor City Football Club Supporters' Association (or BCFCSA) is independent of the club itself but its representatives are members of the management board, giving the fans a voice in the running of Bangor City. The association has been responsible for raising almost £70,000 for the club since its inception and regularly arranges travel for fans to away matches. BCFCSA membership is open to all supporters of Bangor City.

In April 2019 the Supporters Association voted overwhelmingly to create a breakaway club in order to protect football in the city from the Vaughan's. They stated, “We want fans to reconnect with each other and restore the pride and feeling of being a supporter of our historic club. The new club is a creative and positive solution for an ever-changing and precarious situation. We are not disowning Bangor City FC or its history, the club is OURS, it belongs to the fans and local community. “Owners” will come and go but the people remain. Keep the faith.” The new club, named Bangor 1876, were accepted into the Gwynedd League for the 2019–20 season.

=== Rivalries ===
Bangor City's main rivalries were with Caernarfon Town and Rhyl.

=== Biggest Attendances by Competition ===
Competition	Attendance	Opponent	Season	Result
Cymru Premier	2,593	(Wales) Prestatyn Town	2011–12	5–3
Cymru Alliance	739	(Wales) Porthmadog	2018–19	1–2
Welsh Cup	12,000	(Wales) Cardiff City	1927–28	0–2
UEFA Champions League	1,189	(Finland) HJK Helsinki	2011–12	0–3
UEFA Europa League	1,022	(Moldova) Zimbru Chișinău	2012–13	0–0
UEFA Cup^{1}	3,426	(Iceland) ÍA Akranes	1994–95	1–2
UEFA Cup Winners' Cup^{2}	12,000	(Italy) Napoli	1962–63	2–0
UEFA Intertoto Cup^{2}	1,032	(Romania) Gloria Bistriţa	2003	0–1
UEFA Europa League	1,089	(Denmark) Lyngby BK	2017–18	0–3
Friendly	2,567	(England) Liverpool FC U23	2017–18	0–3

- Note 1: Now known as the UEFA Europa League.
- Note 2: Competition now defunct.

=== Academy ===
Bangor City had youth sides at U7, U8, U9, U10, U11, U12, U13, U14, U15, U16 and U19 levels. The U19 side competed in the Welsh Premier U19 League.

== European record ==
Season	Competition	Round	Opponent	Home	Away	Aggregate
1962–63	European Cup Winners' Cup	PR	(Italy) Napoli	2–0	1–3	3–3^{1}
1985–86	UEFA Cup Winners' Cup	1R	(Norway) Fredrikstad	0–0	1–1	1–1 (a)
1985–86	UEFA Cup Winners' Cup	2R	(Spain) Atlético Madrid	0–2	0–1	0–3
1994–95	UEFA Cup	PR	(Iceland) ÍA Akranes	1–2	0–2	1–4
1995–96	UEFA Cup	PR	(Poland) Widzew Łódź	0–4	0–1	0–5
1998–99	UEFA Cup Winners' Cup	QR	(Finland) FC Haka	0–2	0–1	0–3
2000–01	UEFA Cup	QR	(Sweden) Halmstads BK	0–7	0–4	0–11
2002–03	UEFA Cup	QR	(Serbia and Montenegro) Smederevo	1–0	0–2	1–2
2003	UEFA Intertoto Cup	1R	(Romania) Gloria Bistriţa	0–1	2–5	2–6
2005	UEFA Intertoto Cup	1R	(Latvia) Dinaburg FC	1–2	0–2	1–4
2008–09	UEFA Cup	1Q	(Denmark) FC Midtjylland	1–6	0–4	1–10
2009–10	UEFA Europa League	2Q	(Finland) Honka Espoo	0–1	0–2	0–3
2010–11	UEFA Europa League	2Q	(Finland) Honka Espoo	2–1	1–1	3–2
2010–11	UEFA Europa League	3Q	(Portugal) Marítimo	1–2	2–8	3–10
2011–12	UEFA Champions League	2Q	(Finland) HJK Helsinki	0–3	0–10	0–13
2012–13	UEFA Europa League	1Q	(Moldova) Zimbru Chișinău	0–0	1–2	1–2
2014–15	UEFA Europa League	1Q	(Iceland) Stjarnan	0–4	0–4	0–8
2017–18	UEFA Europa League	1Q	(Denmark) Lyngby	0–3	0–1	0–4

Notes

- Note 1: Napoli won playoff game 2–1 at Highbury, London.
- PR: Preliminary round
- QR: Qualifying round
- 1R: First round
- 2R: Second round
- 1Q: First qualifying round
- 2Q: Second qualifying round
- 3Q: Third qualifying round

== Honours ==
=== League ===
- Birmingham District League (1932–38)
- Welsh Senior League (1890–91)
- Cymru North (2019–2022)
- Cymru Alliance (2018–2019)
- National League (English football) (1979–1981)(1982–1984)
- Lancashire Combination
  - Runners up(1): 1938–39
- The Combination
  - Runners up(1): 1910–11
- Cheshire County League
  - Runners up(1): 1953–54, 1958–59
- Cymru Premier:^{[a]} (1992–2018)
  - Champions (3): 1993–94, 1994–95, 2010–11
  - Runners up(2): 2011–12, 2017–18
- Northern Premier League^{[b]}: (1968–79, 1981–82, 1984–92)
  - Runners up (1): 1986–87
  - Champions (1): 1981–82
- North Wales Coast League: (1893–1898)
  - Champions (5): 1895–96, 1899–1900, 1900–01, 1903–04, 1919–20
  - Runners up (4): 1896–97 1896–97 1901–02 1902–03
- Welsh National League (North)
  - Champions (1): 1927–28
  - Runners up (1): 1926–27
- North Wales football Combination
  - Runners up (1): 1930–31

=== Cups ===
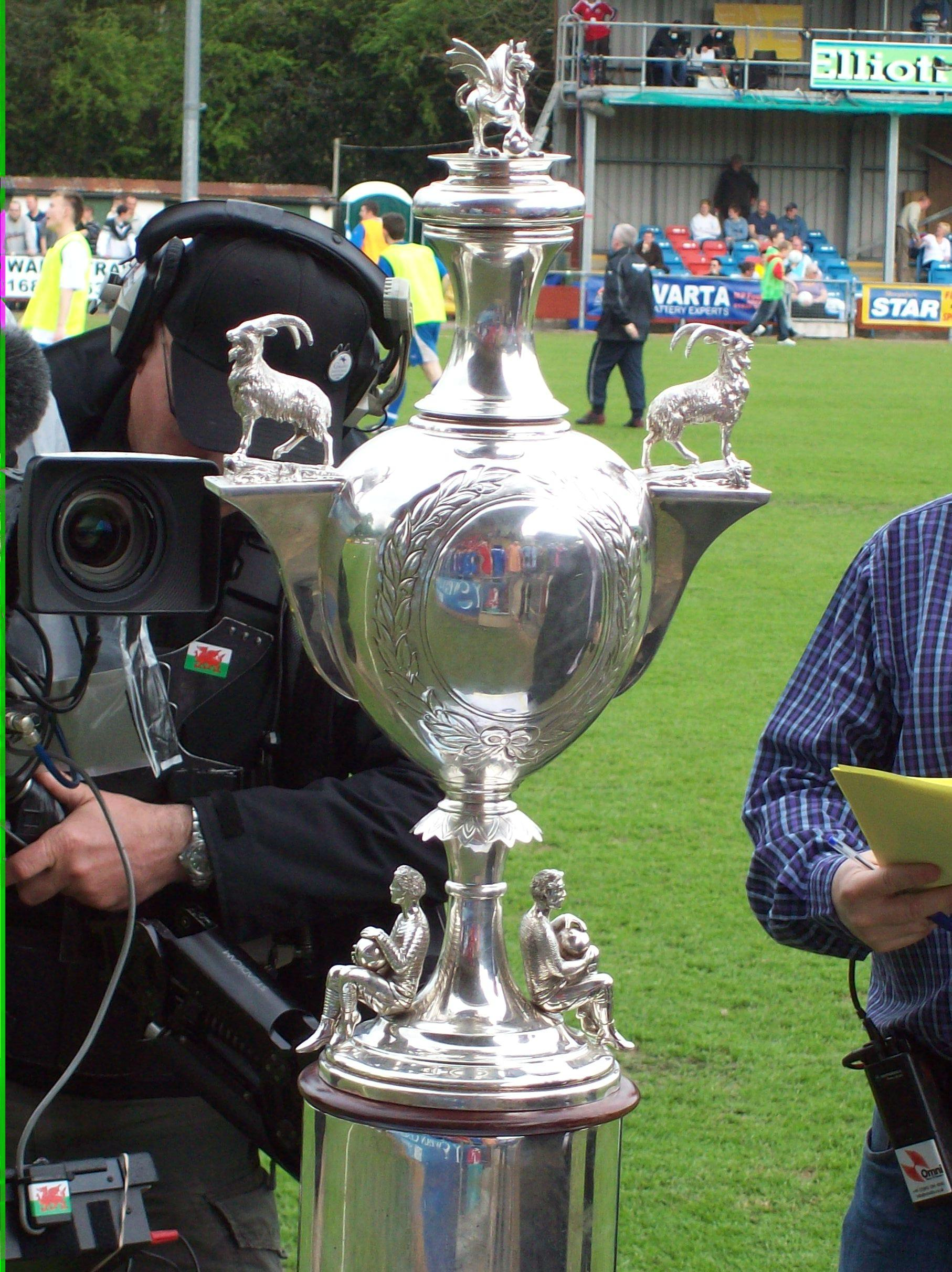
The Welsh Cup is the second oldest national trophy in world football. Above, on display before Bangor City's victory over Cymru Premier rivals Llanelli in the 2008 final at Latham Park, Newtown.

- Welsh Cup: (1877–2022)
  - Winners (8): 1888–89, 1895–96, 1961–62, 1997–98, 1999–2000, 2007–08, 2008–09, 2009–10
  - Runners up (10): 1927–28, 1960–61, 1963–64, 1972–73, 1977–78, 1984–85, 2001–02, 2005–06 2010–11, 2012–13
- North Wales Coast Challenge Cup:
  - Winners (13): 1927, 1936, 1937(twice), 1938, 1947, 1951, 1958, 1965, 1968, 1993, 1999, 2005, 2012
- Northern Premier League Challenge Cup:
  - Winners (1): 1969
- FA Cup:
  - Second round(4): 1960–61, 1969–70, 1972–73, 1983–84
- Northern Premier League President's Cup:
  - Winners (1): 1989
- Northern Premier League Shield:
  - Winners (1): 1987
- North Wales Coast Amateur Cup:^{[c]}
  - Winners (9): 1895, 1896, 1898, 1899, 1901, 1903, 1905, 1906, 1912
- North West Wales Challenge Cup:
  - Winners (1): 1886
- Lancashire Combination Cup:
  - Winners (1): 1949
- Welsh League Cup:
  - Runners up (6): 1994, 1997, 1998, 2000, 2003, 2009
- FA Trophy:
  - Runners up (1): 1983–84
- Cheshire League Cup:
  - Runners up (1): 1954–55

== History in domestic competitions ==
Since the formation of the League of Wales in 1992.

Season	League	Position	Pld	W	D	L	GF	GA	GD	Pts	Average attendance	Welsh Cup	League Cup
1992–93	League of Wales	5th	38	19	7	12	77	58	+19	64	358	Fourth round	First round
1993–94	League of Wales	1st	38	26	5	7	82	26	+56	83	N/A	Semi-finals	Runners-up
1994–95	League of Wales	1st	38	27	7	4	96	26	+70	88	739	Quarter-finals	Quarter-finals
1995–96	League of Wales	4th	40	21	6	13	72	65	+7	69	541	Third round	First round
1996–97	League of Wales	8th	40	20	5	15	82	62	+20	65	443	Third round	Runners-up
1997–98	League of Wales	6th	38	20	8	10	72	54	+18	68	476	Winners	Runners-up
1998–99	League of Wales	11th	32	11	6	15	44	49	–5	39	312	Third round	Semi-finals
1999–2000	League of Wales	9th	34	15	3	16	56	61	–5	48	373	Winners	Runners-up
2000–01	League of Wales	14th	34	10	7	17	56	84	–28	37	373	Quarter-finals	First round
2001–02	League of Wales	3rd	34	21	6	7	83	38	+45	69	511	Runners-up	Quarter-finals
2002–03	Welsh Premier League	3rd	34	22	5	7	75	34	+41	71	533	Quarter-finals	Runners-up
2003–04	Welsh Premier League	6th	32	16	6	10	72	47	+25	54	412	Second round	Semi-finals
2004–05	Welsh Premier League	3rd	34	20	7	7	73	44	+29	67	440	Fourth round	First round
2005–06	Welsh Premier League	9th	34	14	3	17	51	54	–3	45	337	Runners-up	First round
2006–07	Welsh Premier League	9th	32	14	6	12	55	47	+8	48	442	Third round	First round
2007–08	Welsh Premier League	5th	34	15	10	9	62	31	+31	55	446	Winners	Semi-finals
2008–09	Welsh Premier League	6th	34	16	7	11	58	40	+18	55	484	Winners	Runners-up
2009–10	Welsh Premier League	5th	34	19	6	9	75	45	+30	63	457	Winners	First round
2010–11	Welsh Premier League	1st	32	22	4	6	80	44	+36	70	797	Runners-up	Semi-finals
2011–12	Welsh Premier League	2nd	32	22	3	7	72	45	+27	69	728	Third round	Second round
2012–13	Welsh Premier League	3rd	32	14	9	9	65	53	+12	51	589	Runners-up	Second round
2013–14	Welsh Premier League	4th	32	14	6	12	47	50	–3	48	540	Fourth round	First round
2014–15	Welsh Premier League	10th	32	9	8	15	48	62	–14	35	492	Quarter-finals	Third round
2015–16	Welsh Premier League	9th	32	13	6	13	49	52	–3	45	494	Third round	First round
2016–17	Welsh Premier League	4th	32	16	4	12	53	55	–2	52	482	Quarter-finals	Third round
2017–18	Welsh Premier League	2nd	32	19	3	10	49	32	+17	60	420	Semi-finals	Second round
2018–19	Cymru Alliance	4th	30	16	3	11	68	48	+20	51	296	Fourth round	First round
2019–20	Cymru North	5th	22	10	7	5	27	25	+2	27	178	Third round	Second round
2020–21	Cymru North	No competition									N/A	Competition cancelled	Competition cancelled
2021–22	Cymru North	Withdrew from league mid-season									N/A	Third round	Third round

== Biggest victories and losses ==
- Biggest win: 14–0 v. CPD Gwalchmai in 2013
- Biggest defeat: 0–12 v. Everton Reserves in the 1930s.
- Biggest League of Wales win: 9–0 v. Haverfordwest County in 1994.
- Biggest League of Wales defeat: 1–9 v. The New Saints in 2014.
- Biggest European Competition win: 2–0 v. (Italy) Napoli, 5 September 1962.
- Biggest European Competition defeat: 0–10 v. (Finland) HJK Helsinki, 19 July 2011.

== Managerial history ==
Dates	Name	Notes
1876–28	Unknown	
1928–??	(England) Sydney Beaumont	
1932–35	(Wales) Len Davies	
1935–36	(England) Harry Hadley	
1937–39	(Scotland) David Pratt	Manager until the outbreak of World War II
1948–52	(England) George Richardson	
1952–57	(England) Roland Depear	
1957–67	(Wales) T. G. Jones	
1967–70	(Republic of Ireland) Mick McGrath	
1970	(England) Ken Barnes	
1970–72	(England) John Doherty	
1972–74	(England) Alex Smith	Player-manager
1974–75	(Wales) Dick Jones	
1975	(England) Barry Ashworth	Caretaker player-manager
1975–76	(Wales) Roy Rees	
1976–78	(England) Dave Elliott	
1978–79	(England) Stuart Mason	Player-manager
1979–80	(England) Stan Storton	
1980–81	(Wales) Colin Hawkins	
1981–84	(England) Dave Elliott	
1984–86	(Wales) John Mahoney	
1986–??	(England) John Aspinall	
19??–??	(Wales) Kevin Mooney	
19??–89	(Wales) Brian Owen	
1989–92	(Wales) John Mahoney	
1992	(Wales) Ernie Walley	
1992–93	(Wales) Paul Rowlands	
1993–96	(England) Nigel Adkins	
1996	(Wales) Bryan Griffiths	
1996–97	(England) Kevin Langley	
1997–98	(Scotland) Graeme Sharp	
1998	(England) Johnny King	
1998–99	(Wales) Lee Williams	
1999–2001	(Wales) Meirion Appleton	
2001–05	(England) Peter Davenport	
2005–06	(Wales) Mel Jones	Caretaker manager
2006	(Wales) Clayton Blackmore	
2006–07	(England) Steve Bleasdale	
July 2007–25 July 2016	(Wales) Neville Powell	
1 August 2016 – 22 November 2016	(Wales) Andy Legg	
24 November 2016 – 29 March 2017	(England) Ian Dawes	
29 March 2017 – 22 May 2017	(England) Gary Taylor-Fletcher	Caretaker player-manager
22 May 2017–May 2018	(England) Kevin Nicholson	
May 2018–19 October 2018	(England) Craig Harrison	
19 October 2018 – 25 November 2018	(England) Stephen James Vaughan	Caretaker
27 November 2018 – 7 May 2019	(England) Gary Taylor-Fletcher	
5 July 2019 – 5 June 2020	(Argentina) Pedro Pasculli	
5 June 2020–October 2021	(Argentina) Hugo Colace	
11 October 2021 – 2022	(Cameroon) Mathurin Ovambe	

== Notable former players ==
- John Anderson (1961–62) 8 Australia caps
- Tommy Banks (1963–67) 6 England caps
- Warren Bradley (1964–65) 3 England caps
- Bobby Charlton (1 game in March 1978) 106 England caps
- Peter Davenport (2001–04) 1 England cap
- (England) Gary Taylor-Fletcher (2017–2019) player-manager.
- (England) Kevin Langley (1994–97) First player to win championship medals in Division One (now Premiership) and League of Wales (Welsh Premiership)
- Chris Lawler (1978–79) 4 England caps
- (England) Ray Stubbs (1978–80) Broadcaster for BT Sport and previously for the BBC and ESPN.
- (England) Nigel Adkins (1993–96) Player-manager
- Gary Roberts (2003–04) 3 England C caps (born 1984)
- Alun Evans (1994–97) 17 New Zealand caps
- Sam Ayorinde (1998–99) 2 Nigeria caps
- Billy Hughes (1958–60) 1 Northern Ireland cap
- Iam Lawther (1976–77) 4 Northern Ireland caps
- John McClelland (1975–78) 53 Northern Ireland caps
- (Republic of Ireland) Peter Corr (1949–??) 4 Rep of Ireland caps
- (Republic of Ireland) Mick McGrath (1967–69) 22 Rep of Ireland caps
- (Republic of Ireland) Jackie Mooney (1958–60) 2 Rep of Ireland caps
- (Republic of Ireland) Ron Healey (1986) 2 Rep of Ireland caps
- (Republic of Ireland) Eamonn O'Keefe (1990) 5 Rep of Ireland caps
- Graeme Sharp (1997–98) 12 Scotland caps
- Clayton Blackmore (2000–06) 39 Wales caps
- Terry Boyle (2000–01) 2 Wales caps
- Les Cartwright (December 1981) 7 Wales caps
- Dai Davies (1985) 52 Wales caps
- Simon I. Davies (2001–03), (2004–05) 1 Wales cap
- Cliff Jones (1979–80) 59 Wales caps
- Brian Lloyd (1984–85) 3 Wales caps
- Neil Roberts (1996–97) (on loan from Wrexham) 4 Wales caps
- Tony Rowley (1961) 1 Wales cap
- David Smallman (1981) 7 Wales caps
- Neville Southall (1975–76) 92 Wales caps
- Herbie Williams (1979–80) 3 Wales caps
- Marc Lloyd-Williams (1995–2007, various seasons) Record League of Wales/Welsh Premiership Goalscorer, Wales B cap
- Phil Woosnam (1950–51) 17 Wales caps, USA Manager, US Soccer Hall of Fame Inductee
- Owain Tudur Jones (2001–05) 7 Wales caps
- (Wales) Les Davies (2007–15, 2018–19) 275+ Appearances
- (Argentina) Hugo Colace (2020–21) Former Barnsley FC Player of The Year, Argentine Youth Captain
- Scott van-der-Sluis (2021–2022) Wales youth international and current Shelbourne player, was the last ever captain of Bangor City.

== Notes ==
1. ^{a} Prior to 2002 the Cymru Premier was known as the League of Wales.
2. ^{a} Between 2002 and 2019 the Cymru Premier was known as the Welsh Premier League.
3. ^{b} Originally known as North Wales Coast Senior Cup.
