= Welsh National League (North) =

- Founded: 1921
- Folded: 1930
- Country: Wales
- Level on pyramid: 1 & 2
- Domestic cup: Welsh Cup
- Last champions: Caernarvon Athletic (1929–30)
- Most championships: Caernarvon Athletic (2 titles)

The Welsh National League (North) was a football league in north and central Wales which formed the first level of the Welsh football league system between 1921 and 1930, and was part of a short-lived plan to create a national football league in Wales during the 1930s.

== History ==
The league was set up in 1921, absorbing the North Wales Coast League. It ran for nine seasons. In 1930 the majority of clubs split into two new leagues: the North Wales Football Combination and the Welsh League.

== Champions ==
The following teams were champions of the leagues.

=== Division One ===
- 1921–22: – Rhos Athletic
- 1922–23: – Llandudno
- 1923–24: – Oswestry Town
- 1924–26: – Mold Town
- 1925–26: – Rhyl Athletic
- 1926–27: – Caernarvon Athletic
- 1927–28: – Bangor
- 1928–29: – Connah's Quay & Shotton
- 1929–30: – Caernarvon Athletic

=== Division Two - West ===
- 1921–22: – Conway
- 1922–23: – Bangor Athletic reserves
- 1923–24: – Conway
- 1924–25: – Penmaenmawr
- 1925–26: – Blaenau Ffestiniog Amateur
- 1926–27: – Llandudno reserves
- 1927–28: – Blaenau Ffestiniog Amateur
- 1928–29: – Llanfairfechan
- 1929–30: – Bethesda Victoria

=== Division Two - East ===
- 1920–21: – Acrefair Athletic
- 1921–22: – Oak Alyn Rovers
- 1922–23: – No competition
- 1923–24: – Johnstown
- 1924–25: – No competition
- 1925–26: – No competition
- 1926–27: – No competition
- 1927–28: – No competition
- 1928–29: – Denbigh Juniors
- 1929–30: – Prestatyn
