= Llandudno Athletic F.C. =

Football club based in Llandudno

Llandudno Athletic
- Full name: Llandudno Athletic Football Club
- Nickname: Athletic
- Founded: 2014
- Dissolved: 2020
- Ground: The Oval
- Manager: Rhys Lane
- 2019–20: Vale of Clwyd League Premier Division, 8th of 11
Home colours

Llandudno Athletic F.C. was a Welsh football club based in Llandudno, Conwy County Borough. The team last played in the Vale of Clwyd and Conwy Football League Premier Division, at tier 5 of the Welsh football league system.

In the club's first season, they lost 25–0 in a match against Llandudno United.

The team competed in the 2019–20 Welsh Cup, losing 4–1 to Bangor 1876 in the first qualifying round.

The club folded in 2020.

== Honours ==
- Premier Cup – Champions: 2018–19
- Presidents Cup – Champions: 2018–19
