= Clwyd Football League =

Welsh football league

- Founded: 1974
- Folded: 2011
- Country: Wales
- Promotion to: Welsh Alliance
- Last champions: Abergele Rovers (2010–11)

The Clwyd Football League was a football league formed in 1974 as an amalgamation of the Dyserth League and the Halkyn Mountain League. The top division was at different periods at the second, third and fourth levels of the Welsh football league system in North Wales. The league ran until 2011 when a split led to the formation of the Clwyd East Football League comprising Flintshire teams under the North East Wales Football Association and the Vale of Clwyd and Conwy Football League, made up of Denbighshire, Conwy county and Vale of Conwy sides, under the North Wales Coast Football Association.

== History of league formation ==
The Clwyd Football League was proposed in February 1974 as an amalgamation of the Dyserth, and the Halkyn Mountain Leagues. Both these leagues were operating at division three level in the North Wales and the new format was intended to have division two status, which no league in the area then enjoyed.

The newly named Clwyd Football League was set up in time for the 1974–75 season with 10 clubs being accepted, lower than the intended 14 - they were:

- Connah's Quay Nomads
- Courtaulds Flint
- Courtaulds Greenfield
- Denbigh Town
- Flint Town United
- Point of Ayr
- Prestatyn Town
- Rhyl Wanderers
- Saltney Social
- Summers Sports

The inaugural champions were Prestatyn Town.

At the league AGM in June 1975, a further proposal was put forward to allow smaller clubs from the Dyserth and Halkyn Mountain Leagues to be given a new incentive to join the leagues, with the bigger clubs moving up to the Clwyd Premier League. The amalgamation of the Dyserth, Halkyn and Flintshire Youth Leagues was proposed to be embraced by the Clwyd Premier League within five divisions.

A further meeting was convened at Courtaulds Greenfield FC on 10 July. Of the 30 clubs present, 25 voted for the amalgamation with three against. Four divisions were agreed upon with the second and third divisions being made up of clubs from the Halkyn Mountain and Dyserth Leagues and the existing Clwyd Premier League clubs forming the top tier. The Flintshire Youth League would form the basis of the fourth division restricted to under-18 players. Approval was then sought from the parent League – the Welsh National League (North) – at their AGM on Saturday 12 July and permission was unanimously granted.

At a meeting took place in Flint on the 24 July to formulate the league. The number of clubs prepared to participate in the new league had reached 45 and they were asked to formally adopt the constitution of the new body. It was agreed that the Clwyd Premier League would become Division Two, with the Welsh National League (North) being Division One, and limited to 12 clubs. Division Three would also be limited to 12 clubs, made up of the top six clubs in each of the Dyserth and Halkyn Leagues. Division Four would have unlimited membership and include the remaining Dyserth and Halkyn clubs plus any new applicants. Division Five, the youth division, would also be unlimited with the Flintshire Youth League clubs forming the initial membership plus any new applicants. . Dyserth League clubs formally accepted membership of the new league at a special meeting on the 29 July at Rhyl FC. A proposal by Pilkingtons FC, seconded by St Asaph City, that the Dyserth League be formally disbanded was adopted.

== Geographic area ==
The boundaries of the league stretched eastwards along the North Wales coast as far as the English border at Chester, covering the whole of Flintshire, parts of Denbighshire, and Conwy.

== Promotion and relegation ==
All new clubs who joined the league normally entered Division One, or Two, although there were some exceptions when the Vale of Conwy League was functional, the champions, or the runners up were admitted to the Premier Division.

Clubs being promoted from Division 1 (normally the top two), were subject to ground criteria, and dressing rooms must have been on site, and the playing area must have a spectator rail, or at least be roped off during matches.

One team from the top two in the Premier Division could be promoted to the Welsh Alliance League.

== League Champions ==
The following clubs were the senior champions of the league during its duration. Some of the leagues records are missing - tables for four years (1984–85, 1985–86, 1986–87 and 1987–88) are missing. It has been suggested that this is due to two league officials falling out and blaming the other for the omissions.

=== 1970s ===
- 1974–75: – Prestatyn Town
- 1975–76: – Prestatyn Town
- 1976–77: – Courtaulds Greenfield
- 1977–78: – Courtaulds Greenfield
- 1978–79: – Flint Town United
- 1979–80: – Connah's Quay Nomads

=== 1980s ===
- 1980–81: – Connah's Quay Nomads
- 1981–82: – Connah's Quay Nomads
- 1982–83: – Prestatyn Town
- 1983–84: – Prestatyn Town
- 1984–85: – Pilkingtons (St Asaph)
- 1985–86: – United Services
- 1986–87: – Holywell Town
- 1987–88: – Holywell Town
- 1988–89: – Mostyn
- 1989–90: – Connah's Quay Nomads reserves

=== 1990s ===
- 1990–91: – Connah's Quay Albion
- 1991–92: – Llandyrnog United
- 1992–93: – St Asaph City
- 1993–94: – Flint Town United reserves
- 1994–95: – Halkyn United
- 1995–96: – Saltney Community Centre
- 1996–97: – Colwyn Bay Y.M.C.A.
- 1997–98: – Rhyl Delta
- 1998–99: – Prestatyn Town
- 1999–2000: – Abergele Town

=== 2000s ===
- 2000–01: – Rhydymwyn
- 2001–02: – Sealand Leisure
- 2002–03: – Rhyl third team
- 2003–04: – Rhyl third team
- 2004–05: – ABS Sports
- 2005–06: – Castle Rhuddlan
- 2006–07: – Prestatyn Town reserves
- 2007–08: – Prestatyn Town reserves
- 2008–09: – Prestatyn Town reserves
- 2009–10: – Abergele Rovers

=== 2010s ===
- 2010–11: – Abergele Rovers
