= North Wales Coast East Football League =

- Founded: 2020
- Country: Wales
- Number of clubs: 21
- Level on pyramid: 4 & 5
- Promotion to: Ardal Leagues
- Domestic cup(s): Intermediate Challenge Cup (Premier); Junior Challenge Cup (First)
- Current champions: Llandudno Amateurs (2025–26)

The North Wales Coast East Football League is a football league in Wales, at tiers 4 and 5 of the Welsh football league system in north Wales, founded in 2020. The league is under the control of the North Wales Coast Football Association. The league replaced the former Vale of Clwyd and Conwy Football League, and covers the north east of Wales. A corresponding North Wales Coast West Football League was also established at the same time.

== League history ==
Plans for the new league were discussed in March 2020. There were to be two tiers - the Premier Division – with no more than 16 clubs, at tier 4, with Division One – with no more than 16 clubs, at tier 5.

== Member clubs for 2026–27 season ==
=== Premier Division ===
- Cerrigydrudion
- Conwy Borough
- FC Mountain
- Llandudno Amateurs
- Llandudno Junction
- Llandudno Swifts
- Llanfairfechan Town
- Llansannan
- Mochdre Sports
- Penrhyn Bay
- Prestatyn Sports
- Rhos United
- St Asaph City
- Y Glannau

=== Division One ===
- Blue Bridge
- Bro Cernyw
- Crozzy
- Glan Conwy
- Henllan
- Llandyrnog United
- Llysfaen
- Meliden
- Rhuddlan Town
- Rhyl Athletic
- Rhyl Rangers
- Towyn

== Premier Division Champions ==
=== 2020s ===
- 2020–21: Season void
- 2021–22: Y Rhyl 1879
- 2022–23: St Asaph City
- 2023–24: NFA
- 2024–25: Penmaenmawr Phoenix
- 2025–26: Llandudno Amateurs

== Division One Champions ==
=== 2020s ===
- 2020–21: Season void
- 2021–22: Abergele
- 2022–23: Abergele
- 2023–24: Bow
- 2024–25: Rhos United
- 2025–26: Prestatyn Sports

== Cup Competitions ==
Season	Cookson Cup	R.E.M. Jones Cup
2020–21	Season void	Season void
2021–22	Y Rhyl 1879	Cerrigydrudion
2022–23	St Asaph City	Abergele
2023–24	Kinmel Bay	Bow
2024–25	Penmaenmawr Phoenix	Rhos United
2025–26	Mochdre Sports	Rhuddlan Town
