= 2026–27 Welsh Cup =

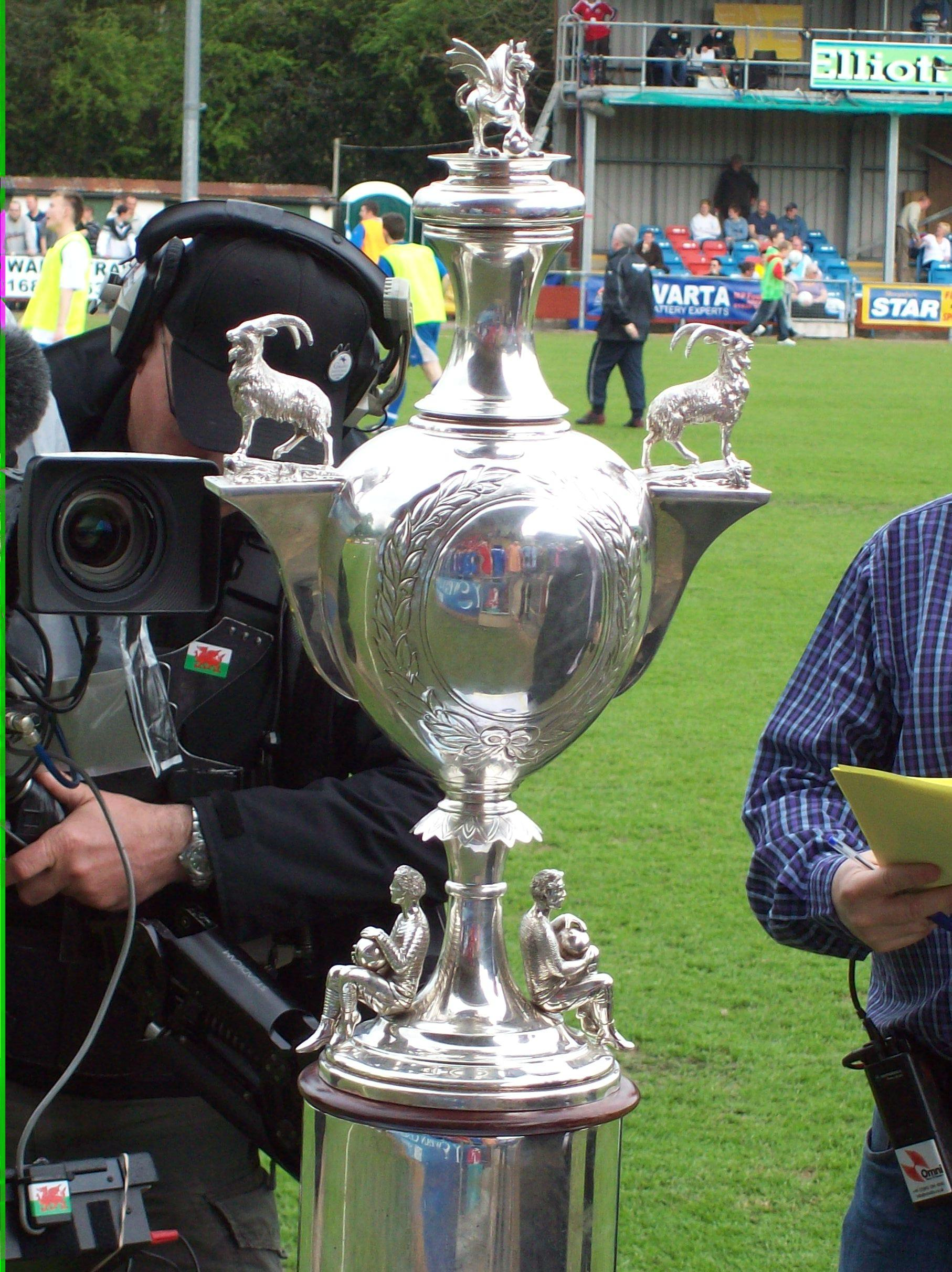
- The Welsh Cup

Tournament details
- Country: Wales

The 2026–27 FAW Welsh Cup is the 139th season of the annual knockout tournament for competitive football teams in Wales. The winners qualify for the 2027–28 UEFA Conference League first qualifying round. Caernarfon Town are the defending cup holders.

== Calendar ==
The dates for the 2026–27 Welsh Cup were announced on 1 June 2026.

Round	Original date	Number of fixtures	Clubs	New Entries	Leagues entering at this round
First qualifying round	24-26 July 2026	116	284 → 168	232	232 Tier 3 and Below clubs
Second qualifying round	21-23 August 2026	60	168 → 108	4	4 Tier 3 clubs
First round	19-20 September 2026	44	108 → 64	28	28 Tier 2 clubs
Second round	17-18 October 2026	32	64 → 32	20	4 Tier 2 clubs 16 Cymru Premier clubs
Third round	13 November 2026	16	32 → 16	None	
Fourth round	12-13 December 2026	8	16 → 8	None	
Quarter-finals	29-31 January 2027	4	8 → 4	None	
Semi-finals	5-7 March 2027	2	4 → 2	None	
Final	18 April 2027	1	2 → 1	None	

== First qualifying round ==
Teams from the third tier of Welsh football and below entered the competition in the first qualifying round. The draw was made on 10 July 2026 and was split geographically, with 100 teams placed in the northern section, and 132 teams in the southern section. All matches were scheduled to be played on the weekend of 25 July 2026.

Teams in bold advanced to the second qualifying round.

Tier 3 clubs:

Ardal League North East	Ardal League North West	Ardal League South East	Ardal League South West
**Bow Street**; Builth Wells; Carno; **Cefn Albion**; Corwen; **Dolgellau Athletic**; **FC Queens Park**; Kerry; Llandrindod Wells; Llanfair United; Llangollen Town; Llanrhaeadr; **Penycae**; **Radnor Valley**; **Rhos Aelwyd**	**Bethesda Athletic**; Broughton United; **Connah's Quay Town**; Kinmel Bay; **Llangefni Town**; **Llanrwst United**; **Llay Welfare**; **Mynydd Isa**; Nefyn United; NFA; **Penmaenmawr Phoenix**; **Prestatyn Town**; **Pwllheli**; **Trearddur Bay**; **Y Felinheli**	Abercarn United; **Abergavenny Town**; Blaenavon Blues; Brecon Corries; **Caldicot Town**; **Chepstow Town**; Croesyceiliog; **Goytre**; Lliswerry; **New Inn**; **Newport Corinthians**; **Risca United**; **Tredegar Town**; Undy Athletic	**AFC Llwydcoed**; **Canton**; **Cardiff Airport**; **Cardiff Corinthians**; Cefn Cribwr; Clydach; Evans & Williams; **Goytre United**; Morriston Town; **Mumbles Rangers**; **Penrhiwceiber Rangers**; **Penydarren**; **Port Talbot Town**; **Seven Sisters Onllwyn**; **Taffs Well**; Ynysygerwn

Tier 4-7 clubs:

North Wales Coast East	North East Wales League	North Wales Coast West	Central Wales League	Gwent County	South Wales League	West Wales League
Premier Division: Cerrigydrudion; **Conwy Borough**; FC Mountain; Llandudno Swifts; **Mochdre Sports**; **Prestatyn Sports**; Rhos United; **St Asaph City**; **Y Glannau**; Division One: Blue Bridge; Henllan; **Llysfaen**; **Meliden**; **Rhuddlan Town**; Towyn	Division One: Acton; **Castell Alun Colts**; **Coedpoeth United**; Greenfield; **Hawarden Rangers**; Lex XI; Penyffordd Lions; Rhostyllen; Rhydymwyn; Saltney Town; Division Two: Caerwys; **Chirk AAA**; **Sychdyn United**; Division Three: Gronant	Premier League: Aberffraw; **Blaenau Ffestiniog**; Boded; Bontnewydd; Cemaes Bay; Gaerwen; Gwalchmai; **Llanberis**; **Llanrug United**; Llanystumdwy; **Menai Bridge Tigers**; Mynydd Llandegai; **Nantlle Vale**; **Penrhyndeudraeth**; Talysarn Celts; Division One: Amlwch Town; **Bethesda Rovers**; Cefni; Deiniolen; Glantraeth; **Holyhead Town**; Llangoed; **Mountain Rangers**	North Division: **Barmouth & Dyffryn United**; Berriew; Llanfyllin Town; Llansantffraid Village; Machynlleth; Montgomery Town; Tywyn Bryncrug; Waterloo Rovers; **Welshpool Town**; South Division: Felinfach; Ffostrasol Wanderers; **Lampeter Town**; Llanidloes Town; Llanilar; Rhayader Town; Tregaron Turfs	Premier Division: **Abertillery Bluebirds**; **Abertillery Excelsiors**; Caerleon; Cefn Fforest; **Clydach Wasps**; Graig Villa Dino; **Monmouth Town**; **Newport Saints**; Pentwynmawr Athletic; **PILCS**; **Pill**; Rogerstone; RTB Ebbw Vale; Sifil; Wattsville; Division One: **Aberbargoed Buds**; AFC Pontymister; Albion Rovers; Cwmcarn Athletic; FC Tredegar; Machen; Nantyglo; Division Two: Trinant	Premier Division: **Afan United**; Bridgend Street; **Clwb Cymric**; **Ely Rangers**; **Llantwit Fardre**; Pencoed Athletic; **Pontyclun**; **Porthcawl Town Athletic**; **Tata Steel United**; **Treherbert**; Championship Division: Dinas Powys; **FC Cwmaman**; Llangeinor; Margam; Pentyrch Rangers; **Penygraig United**; **Splott**; **Ton Pentre**; **Treforest**; Treharris Athletic Western; Division One: AFC Bargoed; **Cwmbach Royal Stars**; **Cwm Welfare**; Cwrt Rawlin; Llanrumney United; Red Lion BGC; **Splott Albion**; **Tongwynlais**; **Trelewis Welfare**; **Treorchy BGC**; **Barry Athletic**; Caerau All Whites; FC Porthcawl; **Grange Albion**; Llanishen; **Vale United**; Taff Ely: **Rhydyfelin**; **Rhydyfelin Non-Political**; Talbot Green	**Cwmamman United**; **Garden Village**; Llandarcy; **Llangennech**; Penlan; **Pontarddulais Town**; **Rockspur Fords**; **South Gower**; **Waunarlwydd Galaxy**; West End; Ynystawe Athletic; Neath: **Bryncoch**; Cwrt Herbert Colts; Swansea: Blaen-y-Maes

=== North ===
Home team	Score	Away team
**24 July 2026**
NFA	0–2	**Mochdre Sports**
Llandudno Swifts	3–4	**Llanrug United**
**25 July 2026**
**Nantlle Vale**	w/o	Corwen
**Hawarden Rangers**	2–1	Llangoed
Berriew	0–1	**Conwy Borough**
**Machynlleth**	2–1	Deiniolen
**Bethesda Rovers**	3–1 (Note: Bethesda Rovers used six substitutes in the match, one more than the allowed five. Bethesda Rovers claimed it was a concussion substitution, which was disputed by Lex. The tie was due to be replayed on 15 August 2026, but Lex reportedly refused to play. Bethesda Rovers were awarded the win, and Lex have appealed the decision.)	Lex XI
Boded	2–3	**Menai Bridge Tigers**
Caerwys	1–1 (2–3 p)	**Mountain Rangers**
**Tywyn Bryncrug**	w/o	Greenfield
**Welshpool Town**	2–2 (5–4 p)	Gwalchmai
**Dolgellau Athletic**	3–2	Nefyn United
**Penycae**	4–2	Broughton United
**Gaerwen**	5–2	Llanidloes Town
Halkyn United	4–4 (3–5 p)	**Prestatyn Sports**
Carno	0–7	**Pwllheli**
Llangollen Town	1–2	**Y Felinheli**
Llansantffraid Village	2–2 (2–3 p)	**Bethesda Athletic**
**Llysfaen**	3–2	Towyn
Llandudno Amateurs	1–2	**Waterloo Rovers**
Llanerch-y-medd	1–9	**Meliden**
Rhayader Town	1–3	**Castell Alun Colts**
**Kinmel Bay**	3–1	Cemaes Bay
Montgomery Town	1–2	**Llanrwst United**
Talysarn Celts	0–2	**Penmaenmawr Phoenix**
**Cefn Albion**	w/o	Mynydd Llandegai
**Coedpoeth United**	2–0	Penyffordd Lions
Holywell Town	2–3	**Llanfair United**
Llanystumdwy	0–7	**Radnor Valley**
Aberffraw	0–1	**Chirk AAA**
Llanrhaeadr	1–1 (2–3 p)	**Connah's Quay Town**
Amlwch Town	0–8	**Llanberis**
**Barmouth & Dyffryn United**	3–1	Llansannan
Blue Bridge	0–12	**Mynydd Isa**
**Sychdyn United**	3–0	Gronant
**Y Glannau**	5–1	Henllan
FC Mountain	0–5	**Prestatyn Town**
**Blaenau Ffestiniog Amateur**	1–1 (6–5 p)	Rhos United
Glantraeth	1–8	**Llanfairpwll**
**Holyhead Town**	3–2	Rhostyllen
Bontnewydd	2–2 (5–6 p)	**Rhuddlan Town**
Llanfairfechan Town	5–5 (3–5 p)	**FC Queens Park**
**Llangefni Town**	3–2	Acton
Llanilar	1–4	**St Asaph City**
Llandrindod Wells	0–6	**Trearddur Bay**
Rhydymwyn	1–8	**Bow Street**
Kerry	2–2 (1–3 p)	**Cerrigydrudion**
Llanfyllin Town	0–3	**Llay Welfare**
**Rhos Aelwyd**	1–0	Saltney Town
Cefni	1–2	**Penrhyndeudraeth**

=== South ===
Home team	Score	Away team
**24 July 2026**
Morriston Town	0–2	**Abernant**
**Abergavenny Town**	4–4 (6–5 p)	Caerleon
Croesyceiliog	0–6	**Chepstow Town**
Treharris Athletic Western	1–3	**Tongwynlais**
Cefn Cribwr	2–3	**Canton**
**Ely Rangers**	3–1	Ynysygerwn
**Caldicot Town**	2–1	Longford
**25 July 2026**
Margam Youth Centre	0–4	**West End**
**Evans & Williams**	5–2	Penrhiwceiber Rangers
Pencoed Athletic	2–3	**Llanyrafon**
Cwrt Y Vil	0–2	**Afan United**
**Waunarlwydd Galaxy**	2–2 (4–3 p)	Talbot Green
AFC Bargoed	1–2	**Penygraig United**
**Treorchy BGC**	1–0	Red Lion Firsts
**Pilcs**	3–2	Lliswerry
**Splott Albion**	5–2	Cwm Wanderers
Cefn Fforest	1–2	**Llantwit Fardre**
**Newport Corinthians**	3–2	Ffostrasol Wanderers
**Porthcawl Town Athletic**	5–1	Machen
**Cardiff Airport**	6–0	Felinfach
FC Porthcawl	1–4	**Ely Valley**
Cwmcarn Athletic	0–4	**Abertillery Excelsiors**
Garw S.B.G.C.	1–1 (1–3 p)	**Lampeter Town**
Brecon Corries	5–6	**Rhydyfelin Non Pol**
**New Inn**	2–1	Blaenavon Blues
**Barry Athletic**	1–0	Cascade YC
**Mumbles Rangers**	2–0	Llechryd
**Tata Steel United**	3–2	Rogerstone
**Cwm Welfare**	2–1	Ynystawe Athletic
**Cwmamman United**	1–1 (5–4 p)	Clydach
Graig Villa Dino	1–3	**Newport Saints**
Burry Port	0–4	**Clwb Cymric**
**Trelewis Welfare**	11–0	Risca Town
**Bryncoch**	2–2 (5–3 p)	Llandarcy
**Tredegar Town**	4–3	Bridgend Street
Albion Rovers	0–0 (0–3 p)	**AFC Llwydcoed**
**Monmouth Town**	1–0	Pentwynmawr Athletic
**Penydarren BGC**	9–1	Wattsville
Bettws	0–0 (1–2 p)	**Goytre (Gwent)**
**Rockspur**	7–0	Nelson Cavaliers
**Garden Village**	3–0	AFC Pontymister
**Vale United**	4–1	Tregaron Turfs
**Seven Sisters Onllwyn**	3–0	AFC Whitchurch
Undy	0–4	**Splott**
Sifil	2–6	**Penrhiwceiber Rangers**
**Treforest**	3–0	Dinas Powys
**Cwmbach Royal Stars SC**	4–1	Nantyglo
**Rhydyfelin**	1–1 (5–3 p)	Llangeinor
**South Gower**	2–0	Pentyrch Rangers
CKSV	0–2	**Grange Albion**
Carn Rovers	0–2	**Aberbargoed Buds**
**Goytre United**	3–0	Glynneath Town
**Abertillery Bluebirds**	6–1	FC Tredegar
**Llangennech**	6–2	Llanrumney United
**Pontarddulais Town**	5–3	Abercarn United
Builth Wells	1–1 (0–3 p)	**Taff's Well**
**Port Talbot Town**	4–0	Brynna
**Clydach Wasps**	4–3	Bryn Rovers
**Pontyclun**	5–0	Penlan
**FC Cwmaman**	2–1	Cwrt Rawlin
Llanishen	0–6	**Risca United**
Cwrt Herbert Colts	0–3	**Cardiff Corinthians**
Trinant	3–3 (3–5 p)	**Ton Pentre**
**Treherbert BGC**	2–2 (5–3 p)	Caerau All Whites
**Blaen-y-Maes**	6–0	Bedwas
**Pill**	3–2	RTB Ebbw Vale

== Second qualifying round ==
120 teams entered the second qualifying round, the 116 winners from the first qualifying round and the four teams that received a bye, Cwmbran Celtic, Cwmbran Town, Knighton Town and Llannefydd. The draw was made on 30 July 2026 and was split geographically, with 52 teams placed in the northern section, and 68 teams in the southern section. All matches were scheduled to be played on the weekend of 21–23 August 2026.

Teams in bold advanced to the first round.

Tier 3 clubs:

Ardal League North East	Ardal League North West	Ardal League South East	Ardal League South West
Bow Street; **Cefn Albion**; **Dolgellau Athletic**; Knighton Town; FC Queens Park; **Penycae**; **Radnor Valley**; Rhos Aelwyd	Bethesda Athletic; Connah's Quay Town; **Llannefydd**; **Llangefni Town**; **Llanrwst United**; **Llay Welfare**; **Mynydd Isa**; Penmaenmawr Phoenix; **Prestatyn Town**; **Pwllheli**; **Trearddur Bay**; **Y Felinheli**	Abergavenny Town; Caldicot Town; **Chepstow Town**; Cwmbran Celtic; **Cwmbrân Town**; **Goytre**; New Inn; **Newport Corinthians**; **Risca United**; **Tredegar Town**	AFC Llwydcoed; **Canton**; **Cardiff Airport**; **Cardiff Corinthians**; **Goytre United**; **Mumbles Rangers**; **Penrhiwceiber Rangers**; **Penydarren**; Port Talbot Town; **Seven Sisters Onllwyn**; Taffs Well

Tier 4-7 clubs:

North Wales Coast East	North East Wales League	North Wales Coast West	Central Wales League	Gwent County	South Wales League	West Wales League
Premier Division: Cerrigydrudion; **Conwy Borough**; **Mochdre Sports**; Prestatyn Sports; **St Asaph City**; **Y Glannau**; Division One: **Llysfaen**; **Meliden**; Rhuddlan Town	Division One: Castell Alun Colts; **Coedpoeth United**; **Hawarden Rangers**; Division Two: Chirk AAA; Sychdyn United	Premier League: Blaenau Ffestiniog; **Llanberis**; Llanrug United; **Menai Bridge Tigers**; **Nantlle Vale**; Penrhyndeudraeth; Division One: Bethesda Rovers; Holyhead Town; Mountain Rangers	North Division: **Barmouth & Dyffryn United**; Welshpool Town; South Division: Lampeter Town	Premier Division: **Abertillery Bluebirds**; **Abertillery Excelsiors**; Clydach Wasps; Monmouth Town; **Newport Saints**; **PILCS**; Pill; Division One: **Aberbargoed Buds**	Premier Division: **Afan United**; Clwb Cymric; **Ely Rangers**; **Llantwit Fardre**; Pontyclun; **Porthcawl Town Athletic**; Tata Steel United; Treherbert; Championship Division: **FC Cwmaman**; **Penygraig United**; Splott; Ton Pentre; Treforest; Division One: Cwmbach Royal Stars; Cwm Welfare; Splott Albion; **Tongwynlais**; Trelewis Welfare; Treorchy BGC; Barry Athletic; Grange Albion; Vale United; Taff Ely: Rhydyfelin; **Rhydyfelin Non-Political**	Cwmamman United; Garden Village; **Llangennech**; **Pontarddulais Town**; **Rockspur Fords**; **South Gower**; Waunarlwydd Galaxy; Neath: Bryncoch

=== North ===
Home team	Score	Away team
**21 August 2026**
**Menai Bridge Tigers**	6–1	Mountain Rangers
**22 August 2026**
**Barmouth & Dyffryn United**	1–0	Penrhyndeudraeth
Bethesda Athletic	1–6	**Nantlle Vale**
Bow Street	1–1 (a.e.t.) (3-4 p.)	**St Asaph City**
**Coedpoeth United**	4–2	Welshpool Town
**Hawarden Rangers**	2–1	Sychdyn United
Holyhead Town	1–1 (a.e.t.) (3-5 p.)	**Conwy Borough**
Kinmel Bay	1–2	**Y Felinheli**
Knighton Town	1–2	**Y Glannau**
**Llanberis**	2–2 (a.e.t.) (4-2 p.)	FC Queens Park
Llanfairpwll	3–3 (a.e.t.) (2-4 p.)	**Gaerwen**
**Llangefni Town**	5–1	Llanfair United
Llanrug United	1–5	**Llannefydd**
**Llay Welfare**	3–2	Blaenau Ffestiniog Amateur
**Llysfaen**	3–2	Bethesda Rovers
Machynlleth	1–4	**Mochdre Sports**
**Meliden**	2–2 (a.e.t.) (4-3 p.)	Cerrigydrudion
**Penycae**	4–2	Penmaenmawr Phoenix
Prestatyn Sports	2–4	**Mynydd Isa**
**Radnor Valley**	2–2 (a.e.t.) (5-3 p.)	Castell Alun Colts
Rhos Aelwyd	0–4	**Cefn Albion**
Rhuddlan Town	0–8	**Pwllheli**
**Trearddur Bay**	8–1	Connah's Quay Town
Tywyn Bryncrug	0–1	**Prestatyn Town**
Waterloo Rovers	1–2	**Dolgellau Athletic**
**23 August 2026**
**Llanrwst United**	3–1	Chirk AAA

=== South ===
Home team	Score	Away team
**22 August 2026**
**Aberbargoed Buds**	3–2	AFC Llwydcoed
Abernant	0–1	**Tredegar Town**
**Abertillery Bluebirds**	6–4	Barry Athletic
**Afan United**	6–2	Waunarlwydd Galaxy
**Cardiff Airport**	2–0	Cwm Welfare
**Cardiff Corinthians**	3–0	Treherbert BGC
**Chepstow Town**	4–0	Bryncoch
Clwb Cymric	2–2 (a.e.t.) (2-4 p.)	**Llantwit Fardre**
Clydach Wasps	0–1	**FC Cwmaman**
Cwmamman United	1–3	**Llangennech**
Cwmbran Celtic	1–2	**Newport Corinthians**
**Cwmbran Town**	7–0	West End
Ely Valley	1–4	**Blaen-y-Maes**
**Evans & Williams**	3–3 (a.e.t.) (4-3 p.)	Port Talbot Town
Garden Village	0–2	**Pilcs**
Lampeter Town	1–3	**Seven Sisters Onllwyn**
**Mumbles Rangers**	1–0	Cwmbach Royal Stars SC
New Inn	1–2	**Rockspur**
**Penrhiwceiber Rangers**	3–0	Tata Steel United
**Penygraig United**	1–0	Abergavenny Town
**Pontarddulais Town**	1–0	Caldicot Town
Pontyclun	2–3	**Ely Rangers**
**Porthcawl Town Athletic**	3–1	Treorchy BGC
Rhydyfelin	0–8	**Goytre United**
**Rhydyfelin Non Pol**	6–1	Trelewis Welfare
**Risca United**	3–1	Grange Albion
**South Gower**	2–1	Vale United
Splott Albion	1–2	**Abertillery Excelsiors**
Splott	1–3	**Newport Saints**
Taff's Well	3–3 (a.e.t.) (3-4 p.)	**Monmouth Town**
Ton Pentre	0–2	**Canton**
**Tongwynlais**	5–0	Llanyrafon
Treforest	1–2	**Penydarren BGC**
**26 August 2026**
**Goytre (Gwent)**	3–0 (Note: Pill were originally drawn at home, but the fixture was reversed and played at Goytre.)	Pill

== First round ==
88 teams entered the first round, the 60 winners from the second qualifying round and 28 clubs from Cymru North and Cymru South. Four second tier clubs received a bye to the second round: Newtown, Bala Town, Caerau Ely, and Llanelli Town. The draw was held on 27 August 2026 and split geographically, with 40 teams placed in the northern section, and 48 teams in the southern section. All matches were scheduled to be played on the weekend of 19–20 September 2026.

Tier 2-3 clubs:

Cymru North	Cymru South	Ardal League North East	Ardal League North West	Ardal League South East	Ardal League South West
Bangor City 1876; Brickfield Rangers; Buckley Town; Caersws; Denbigh Town; Gresford Athletic; Guilsfield; Holyhead Hotspur; Mold Alexandra; Llanuwchllyn; Penrhyncoch; Porthmadog; Rhyl 1879; Ruthin Town	Aberystwyth Town; Afan Lido; Baglan Dragons; Caerphilly Athletic; Cardiff Draconians; Carmarthen Town; Llantwit Major; Newport City; Pontardawe Town; Pontypridd United; Pure Swansea; Treowen Stars; Trethomas Bluebirds; Ynyshir Albions	Cefn Albion; Dolgellau Athletic; Penycae; Radnor Valley	Llannefydd; Llangefni Town; Llanrwst United; Llay Welfare; Mynydd Isa; Prestatyn Town; Pwllheli; Trearddur Bay; Y Felinheli	Chepstow Town; Cwmbrân Town; Goytre; Newport Corinthians; Risca United; Tredegar Town	Canton; Cardiff Airport; Cardiff Corinthians; Evans & Williams; Goytre United; Mumbles Rangers; Penrhiwceiber Rangers; Penydarren; Seven Sisters Onllwyn

Tier 4 and below clubs:

North Wales Coast East	North East Wales League	North Wales Coast West	Central Wales League	Gwent County	South Wales League	West Wales League
Premier Division: Conwy Borough; Mochdre Sports; St Asaph City; Y Glannau; Division One: Llysfaen; Meliden	Division One: Coedpoeth United; Gaerwen; Hawarden Rangers	Premier League: Llanberis; Menai Bridge Tigers; Nantlle Vale	North Division: Barmouth & Dyffryn United	Premier Division: Abertillery Bluebirds; Abertillery Excelsiors; Monmouth Town; Newport Saints; PILCS; Division One: Aberbargoed Buds	Premier Division: Afan United; Ely Rangers; Llantwit Fardre; Porthcawl Town Athletic; Championship Division: FC Cwmaman; Penygraig United; Division One: Tongwynlais; Taff Ely: Rhydyfelin Non-Political	Llangennech; Pontarddulais Town; Rockspur Fords; South Gower; Swansea Senior League: Blaen-y-Maes AFC

=== North ===
Home team	Score	Away team
19 September 2026
Brickfield Rangers (2)	2–1	Rhyl 1879 (2)
Cefn Albion (3)	1–0	Gresford Athletic (2)
Coedpoeth United (4)	3–3 (4–3 p)	St Asaph City (4)
Dinas Bangor City 1876 (2)	3–3 (5–4 p)	Mold Alexandra (2)
Gaerwen (4)	3–4	Dolgellau Athletic (3)
Guilsfield (2)	6–1	Mynydd Isa (3)
Hawarden Rangers (4)	0–5	Llangefni Town (3)
Holyhead Hotspur (2)	3–2	Caersws (2)
Llannefydd (3)	3–2	Conwy Borough (4)
Llanrwst United (3)	1–6	Prestatyn Town (3)
Llanuwchllyn (2)	1–1 (4–3 p)	Llanberis (4)
Llysfaen (5)	2–1	Barmouth & Dyffryn United (4)
Menai Bridge Tigers (4)	0–2	Aberystwyth Town (2)
Mochdre Sports (4)	2–2 (6–5 p)	Pwllheli (3)
Nantlle Vale (4)	3–6	Penycae (3)
Penrhyncoch (2)	1–1 (3–4 p)	Porthmadog (2)
Y Glannau (4)	0–9	Buckley Town (2)
Ruthin Town (2)	0–3	Llay Welfare (3)
Denbigh Town (2)	2–1	Trearddur Bay (3)
24 September 2026
Y Felinheli (3)	11–0	Meliden (5)

=== South ===
Home team	Score	Away team
18 September 2026
Afan Lido (2)	4–1	Goytre (Gwent) (3)
Caerphilly Athletic (2)	2–2 (4–1 p)	Treowen Stars (2)
Pure Swansea (2)	2–3	Trethomas Bluebirds (2)
Seven Sisters Onllwyn (3)	2–3	Radnor Valley (3)
19 September 2026
Afan United (4)	4–3	Penygraig United (5)
Blaen-y-Maes (5)	5–2	Abertillery Excelsiors (4)
Cardiff Draconians (2)	5–1	Aberbargoed Buds (5)
Carmarthen Town (2)	4–1	Newport Saints (4)
Cwmaman (5)	1–1 (4–3 p)	Cardiff Airport (3)
Goytre United (3)	5–1	Rhydyfelin Non Pol (7)
Llangennech (4)	1–0	Cwmbran Town (3)
Llantwit Major (2)	6–0	Porthcawl Town Athletic (4)
Mumbles Rangers (3)	0–0 (2–3 p)	Baglan Dragons (2)
Newport City (2)	3–0	Canton (3)
Newport Corinthians (3)	2–7	Rockspur (4)
PILCS (4)	1–7	Ely Rangers (4)
Pontardawe Town (2)	4–1	Penrhiwceiber Rangers (3)
Pontarddulais Town (4)	2–0	Monmouth Town (4)
Risca United (3)	1–2	Llantwit Fardre (4)
South Gower (4)	0–1	Cardiff Corinthians (3)
Tongwynlais (6)	3–5	Evans & Williams (3)
Tredegar Town (3)	1–1 (5–4 p)	Penydarren BGC (3)
Ynyshir Albions (2)	2–1	Pontypridd United (2)
26 September 2026
Abertillery Bluebirds (4)	2–2 (2–3 p)	Chepstow Town (3)

== Second round ==
64 teams entered the second round, the 44 winners from the first round, the four clubs from Cymru North and Cymru South that received a bye, and the 16 Cymru Premier clubs. Three teams from Tier 5 (Llysfaen, FC Cwmaman, and Blaen-y-Maes AFC) were the lowest ranked teams remaining in the competition. The draw was held on 29 September 2026 and split geographically, with 30 teams placed in the northern section, and 34 teams in the southern section. All matches are scheduled to be played across the weekend of 16–18 October 2026.

Cymru Premier	Cymru North	Cymru South	Ardal Leagues	Other Leagues
Airbus UK Broughton; Ammanford; Barry Town United; Briton Ferry Llansawel; Caernarfon Town; Cambrian United; Cardiff Met; Colwyn Bay; Connah's Quay Nomads; Flint Town United; Haverfordwest County; Holywell Town; Llandudno; Penybont; The New Saints; Trefelin BGC	Bala Town; Bangor City 1876; Brickfield Rangers; Buckley Town; Denbigh Town; Guilsfield; Holyhead Hotspur; Llanuwchllyn; Newtown; Porthmadog	Aberystwyth Town; Afan Lido; Baglan Dragons; Caerau Ely; Caerphilly Athletic; Cardiff Draconians; Carmarthen Town; Llanelli Town; Llantwit Major; Newport City; Pontardawe Town; Trethomas Bluebirds; Ynyshir Albions	Ardal League North East: Cefn Albion; Dolgellau Athletic; Penycae; Radnor Valley; Ardal League North West: Llannefydd; Llangefni Town; Llay Welfare; Prestatyn Town; Y Felinheli; Ardal League South East: Chepstow Town; Tredegar Town; Ardal League South West: Cardiff Corinthians; Evans & Williams; Goytre United	North Wales Coast East: Mochdre Sports (Premier Division); Llysfaen (Division One); North East Wales League: Coedpoeth United (Division One); South Wales League: Afan United (Premier Division); Ely Rangers (Premier Division); Llantwit Fardre (Premier Division); FC Cwmaman (Championship Division); West Wales League: Llangennech; Pontarddulais Town; Rockspur Fords; Swansea Senior League: Blaen-y-Maes AFC

=== North ===
Home team	Score	Away team
16 October 2026
Airbus UK Broughton (1)	1–2	The New Saints (1)
Connah's Quay Nomads (1)	4–0	Porthmadog (2)
Denbigh Town (2)	0–2	Bangor City 1876 (2)
17 October 2026
Coedpoeth United (4)	3–3 (9–8 p)	Guilsfield (2)
Llannefydd (3)	0–1	Llandudno (1)
Newtown (2)	7–0	Llanuwchllyn (2)
Bala Town (2)	3–4	Holyhead Hotspur (2)
Penycae (3)	1–4	Dolgellau Athletic (3)
Aberystwyth Town (2)	5–1	Prestatyn Town (3)
Flint Town United (1)	1–3	Caernarfon Town (1)
Llay Welfare (3)	3–3 (4–5 p)	Holywell Town (1)
Buckley Town (2)	2–2 (3–4 p)	Colwyn Bay (1)
Brickfield Rangers (2)	2–0	Llangefni Town (3)
Cefn Albion (3)	2–3	Y Felinheli (3)
Llysfaen (5)	0–2	Mochdre Sports (4)

=== South ===
Home team	Score	Away team
16 October 2026
Evans & Williams (3)	3–4	Rockspur (4)
Caerau Ely (2)	6–0	Llanelli Town (2)
Briton Ferry Llansawel (1)	5–0	Afan United (4)
Cardiff Met (1)	4–0	Ynyshir Albions (2)
Cambrian United (1)	5–0	Trethomas Bluebirds (2)
17 October 2026
Pontarddulais Town (4)	3–1	Goytre United (3)
Trefelin BGC (1)	4–1	Llantwit Major (2)
Blaen-y-Maes (5)	5–2	Ely Rangers (4)
Radnor Valley (3)	1–3	Cardiff Draconians (2)
Barry Town United (1)	2–0	Tredegar Town (3)
FC Cwmaman (5)	2–4	Ammanford (1)
Llangennech (4)	1–1 (4–2 p)	Pontardawe Town (2)
Caerphilly Athletic (2)	1–0	Chepstow Town (3)
Llantwit Fardre (4)	1–3	Baglan Dragons (2)
Haverfordwest County (1)	4–0	Cardiff Corinthians (3)
Carmarthen Town (2)	4–5	Newport City (2)
18 October 2026
Afan Lido (2)	2–3	Penybont (1)

== Third round ==
The 32 winners from the second round entered the third round. Blaen-y-Maes AFC from Tier 5 was the lowest ranked team remaining in the competition. The draw was held on 19 October 2026. All matches were held across the weekend of 13–15 November 2026.

Cymru Premier	Cymru North	Cymru South	Other Leagues
Ammanford; Barry Town United; Briton Ferry Llansawel; Caernarfon Town; Cambrian United; Cardiff Met; Colwyn Bay; Connah's Quay Nomads; Haverfordwest County; Holywell Town; Llandudno; Penybont; The New Saints; Trefelin BGC	Bangor City 1876; Brickfield Rangers; Holyhead Hotspur; Newtown	Aberystwyth Town; Baglan Dragons; Caerau Ely; Caerphilly Athletic; Cardiff Draconians; Newport City	Ardal League North East: Dolgellau Athletic; Ardal League North West: Y Felinheli; North Wales Coast East: Mochdre Sports (Premier Division); North East Wales League: Coedpoeth United (Division One); West Wales League: Llangennech; Pontarddulais Town; Rockspur Fords; Swansea Senior League: Blaen-y-Maes AFC

Home team	Score	Away team
13 November 2026
Baglan Dragons (2)	1–1 (2–3 p)	Barry Town United (1)
Caernarfon Town (1)	4–0	Holywell Town (1)
Connah's Quay Nomads (1)	6–0	Mochdre Sports (4)
Penybont (1)	6–0	Cardiff Draconians (2)
The New Saints (1)	5–0	Briton Ferry Llansawel (1)
14 November 2026
Colwyn Bay (1)	2–0	Aberystwyth Town (2)
Llangennech (4)	1–0	Newport City (2)
Haverfordwest County (1)	3–1	Ammanford (1)
Newtown (2)	3–1	Caerphilly Athletic (2)
Caerau Ely (2)	1–0	Brickfield Rangers (2)
Holyhead Hotspur (2)	5–0	Blaen-y-Maes (5)
Llandudno (1)	6–1	Y Felinheli (3)
Trefelin BGC (1)	6–0	Coedpoeth United (4)
Cardiff Met (1)	6–0	Dolgellau Athletic (3)
Rockspur (4)	5–1	Pontarddulais Town (4)
15 November 2026
Cambrian United (1)	1–0	Bangor City 1876 (2)

== Fourth round ==
The 16 winners from the third round entered the third round. Llangennech and Rockspur Fords from Tier 4 were the lowest ranked teams remaining in the competition. The draw was held on 16 November 2026. All matches are scheduled to be played 11 or 12 December 2026.

Cymru Premier	Other Leagues
Barry Town United; Caernarfon Town; Cambrian United; Cardiff Met; Colwyn Bay; Connah's Quay Nomads; Haverfordwest County; Llandudno; Penybont; The New Saints; Trefelin BGC	Cymru North: Holyhead Hotspur; Newtown; Cymru South: Caerau Ely; West Wales League: Llangennech; Rockspur Fords

Home team	Score	Away team
11 December 2026
Cardiff Met (1)	–	Trefelin BGC (1)
12 December 2026
Newtown (2)	–	Llangennech (4)
Caernarfon Town (1)	–	Cambrian United (1)
Colwyn Bay (1)	–	Caerau Ely (2)
Llandudno (1)	–	Rockspur (4)
Barry Town United (1)	–	Connah's Quay Nomads (1)
Haverfordwest County (1)	–	The New Saints (1)
Penybont (1)	–	Holyhead Hotspur (2)
