= 2025–26 Welsh Cup =

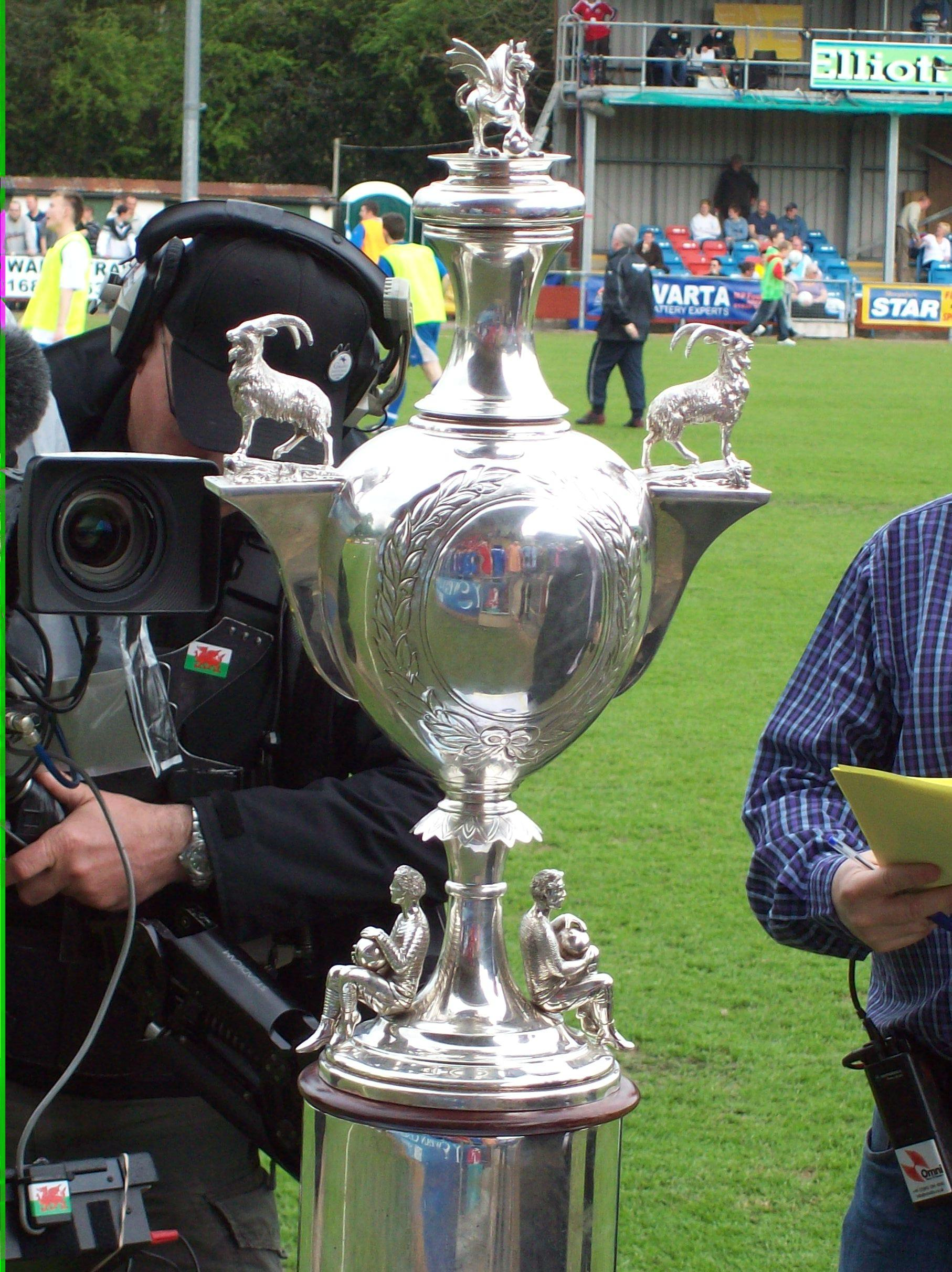
- The Welsh Cup

Tournament details
- Country: Wales

Final positions
- Champions: Caernarfon Town (1st title)
- Runners-up: Flint Town United

The 2025–26 FAW Welsh Cup was the 138th season of the annual knockout tournament for competitive football teams in Wales. The winners qualified for the 2026–27 UEFA Conference League first qualifying round. The New Saints were the defending cup holders.

Caernarfon Town won the cup (their first Welsh Cup win), defeating Flint Town United 3–0 in the final.

== First qualifying round ==
Teams from the third tier of Welsh football and below entered the competition in the first qualifying round. The draw was split geographically, with 100 teams placed in the northern section, and 128 teams in the southern section, split at random into two pots of 64. The draw was made on 10 July 2025. Matches were played on the weekend of 26 July 2025.

=== North ===
Home team	Score	Away team
25 July 2025
Dolgellau Athletic	3–1	Llanfairfechan Town
Llangefni Town	5–0	Llanystumdwy
Berriew	1–0	Llanfyllin Town
Bangor City 1876	3–1	Mochdre Sports
26 July 2025
FC Queens Park	3–0	Mynydd Llandegai
Porthmadog	1–0	Barmouth & Dyffryn United
Hawarden Rangers	2–0	Llanilar
Mynydd Isa	2–3	Nefyn United
Cefn Albion	2–1 (Note: Match abandoned in the 89th minute, result allowed to stand.)	Rhos Aelwyd
Conwy Borough Swifts	1–0	Rhydymwyn
Y Felinheli	2–4	Bethesda Athletic
Llandyrnog United	1–4	NFA
Blue Bridge	0–5	Cemaes Bay
Glan Conwy	0–4	Y Glannau
Montgomery Town	1–2	Llanberis
St Asaph City	1–1 (4–2 p)	Castell Alun Colts
Bethesda Rovers	3–3 (8–9 p)	Llanrug United
Caergybi	w/o	Trearddur Bay
Four Crosses	3–2	Talysarn Celts
Broughton United	5–1	Penrhyndeudraeth
Pwllheli	2–0	Amlwch Town
Penyffordd Lions	1–6	Knighton Town
Machynlleth	1–0	Menai Bridge Tigers
Llanfair United	4–0	Gaerwen
Rhuddlan Town	2–6	Greenfield
Rhostyllen	2–1	Deeside Dragons
Llanuwchllyn	0–2	Llanrwst United
Llandudno Junction	1–1 (4–5 p)	Nantlle Vale
Prestatyn Sports	1–3	Penmaenmawr Phoenix
Saltney Town	4–1	Holyhead Town
Llanrhaeadr	0–2	Forden United
Prestatyn Town	1–3	Corwen
Glantraeth	0–5	Gwalchmai
Cerrigydrudion	3–1	Llangoed
Cefni	0–4	Bow Street
Rhayader Town	5–3	Blaenau Ffestiniog Amateur
Lex XI	1–1 (6–5 p)	Builth Wells
Coedpoeth United	6–3	Deiniolen
Bontnewydd	1–5	Llannefydd
Kerry	1–7	Penycae
Llandrindod Wells	2–3	Llangollen Town
Llanidloes Town	5–2	Llanfairpwll
Llansantffraid Village	2–1	Bro Cernyw
Welshpool Town	1–1 (5–4 p)	Meliden
Sychdyn United	3–0	Abermule
Rhos United	6–0	Pentraeth
Henllan	2–9	Llandudno Amateurs
Connah's Quay Town	0–1	Llay Welfare
Llanerchymedd	2–0	Waterloo Rovers
27 July 2025
Chirk AAA	1–1 (5–6 p)	Kinmel Bay

=== South ===
Home team	Score	Away team
25 July 2025
Treorchy BGC	3–2	Ton Pentre
Treharris Athletic Western	0–4	Clwb Cymric
Ynystawe Athletic	4–1	Fairfield United
Penrhiwceiber Rangers	4–0	South Gower
Taff's Well	1–0	Pontardawe Town
26 July 2025
Undy	5–0	Bettws
Aberdare Town	6–3	Pentyrch Rangers
Nantyglo	4–3	FC Porthcawl
Tredegar Town	3–1	Bryn Rovers
Rhydyfelin	9–1	Aberystwyth Exiles
Pantyscallog Village	0–7	Caerau All Whites
Bridgend Street	1–0	Caerleon
Port Talbot Town	5–2	AFC Whitchurch
Splott	1–5	Afan United
Machen	0–3	Grange Albion
FC Cwmaman	0–8	Pure Swansea
Morriston Town	2–2 (5–4 p)	Radnor Valley
Cwmbrân Town	6–0	Heolgerrig Red Lion Community
Glynneath Town	2–2 (5–4 p)	Cardiff Corinthians
Goytre United	4–0	Cwm Wanderers
Goytre	– (Note: Match abandoned after 12 minutes. Rescheduled for 30 July 2025.)	Penydarren BGC
AFC Pontymister	1–2	Clydach
Albion Rovers	0–11	Caldicot Town
Canton Rangers	1–3	Pill
Chepstow Town	1–2	Llandarcy
Cwmcarn Athletic	1–1 (4–3 p)	Sully Sports
St Joseph's	5–1	Alway
Newport Corinthians	12–0	Hay St Marys
Rockspur	3–1	Newport Saints
Tata Steel United	7–0	Risca Town
Llantwit Fardre	1–3	Penygraig United
Garden Village	0–0 (4–2 p)	Mumbles Rangers
Croesyceiliog	1–0	Penlan
Treforest	2–0	Ponthir
Cascade YC	2–2 (4–6 p)	Bryncoch
Burry Port	1–2	Cwmbach Royal Stars SC
Lliswerry	3–1	Porthcawl Town Athletic
Abergavenny Town	2–1	Ely Rangers
Cwm Welfare	3–1	Llangennech
Treherbert BGC	2–3	AFC Wattstown
Caerphilly Athletic	4–1	Cwrt Rawlin
Pentwynmawr Athletic	0–0 (3–2 p)	New Inn
Wattsville	3–5	Canton
Sifil	1–0	Pencoed Athletic
Brynna	3–3 (3–5 p)	Nelson Cavaliers
RTB Ebbw Vale	0–2	Pontyclun
Blaen-y-Maes	1–4	Cwmamman United
Pontarddulais Town	4–1	Carn Rovers
Abertillery Bluebirds	1–1 (2–4 p)	Giants Grave
Tonyrefail BGC	2–3	Ffostrasol Wanderers
West End	0–2	AFC Llwydcoed
Abertillery Excelsiors	3–1	Monmouth Town
Aber Valley	2–2 (1–4 p)	Margam Youth Centre
Ynysygerwn	2–1	AFC Bargoed
Rogerstone	4–2	AFC Glais
Talbot Green	0–5	Seven Sisters Onllwyn
Dinas Powys	2–2 (4–1 p)	Clydach Wasps
Blaenavon Blues	7–0	The Baglan
Abercarn United	2–0	CKSV
Cardiff Airport	2–4	Evans & Williams
Cefn Cribwr	7–1	Risca United
Fairwater	2–0	Llangeinor
Llanrumney United	2–1	Vale United
30 July 2025
Brecon Corries	3–1	Cardiff Bay Warriors
Goytre	0–1	Penydarren BGC

== Second qualifying round ==
The 114 first qualifying round winners entered the second qualifying round. The draw was made on 6 August 2025. Matches were played on the weekend of 22 August 2025.

=== North ===
Home team	Score	Away team
22 August 2025
Welshpool Town (4)	1–1 (4–2 p)	Four Crosses (4)
Sychdyn United (5)	4–1	Lex XI (3)
23 August 2025
Llanrug United (4)	4–0	Gwalchmai (4)
Greenfield (4)	1–2	Berriew (4)
Cerrigydrudion (4)	0–7	FC Queens Park (4)
Llandudno Amateurs (4)	1–4	Porthmadog (3)
Conwy Borough Swifts (4)	0–12	Bangor City 1876 (3)
Llanberis (4)	1–0	Llansantffraid Village (4)
Llanerchymedd (4)	1–4	Rhayader Town (4)
Forden United (4)	3–2	Llanrwst United (3)
Llay Welfare (3)	0–3	Cefn Albion (3)
Bethesda Athletic (3)	0–0 (6–7 p)	NFA (3)
Broughton United (4)	1–0	Corwen (3)
Penmaenmawr Phoenix (3)	2–3	Nefyn United (4)
Kinmel Bay (4)	3–0	Llangollen Town (3)
Llanfair United (3)	4–2	Cemaes Bay (4)
Y Glannau (4)	2–3	St Asaph City (3)
Bow Street (3)	3–2	Penycae (3)
Machynlleth (4)	0–3	Llannefydd (3)
Pwllheli (3)	4–3	Knighton Town (3)
Llangefni Town (3)	3–5	Trearddur Bay (3)
Rhos United (4)	2–2 (2–3 p)	Hawarden Rangers (4)
Dolgellau Athletic (3)	6–0	Llanidloes Town (4)
Saltney Town (4)	5–2	Coedpoeth United (4)
Rhostyllen (4)	3–1	Nantlle Vale (4)

=== South ===
Home team	Score	Away team
22 August 2025
Undy (3)	4–5	Taff's Well (3)
St Joseph's (4)	0–3	Goytre United (3)
Canton (3)	3–1	Fairwater (6)
Rogerstone (4)	0–2	Penrhiwceiber Rangers (3)
23 August 2025
Caldicot Town (3)	3–0	Abergavenny Town (3)
Tredegar Town (3)	2–1	Caerau All Whites (6)
Cwm Welfare (6)	4–2	Bridgend Street (4)
Evans & Williams (3)	1–1 (4–3 p)	Bryncoch (5)
Cwmbrân Town (3)	3–1	Pontarddulais Town (4)
Abercarn United (3)	2–1	Rockspur (4)
Abertillery Excelsiors (4)	4–1	Ffostrasol Wanderers (4)
Penydarren BGC (4)	2–0	Cwmamman United (4)
Giants Grave (4)	0–2	Seven Sisters Onllwyn (3)
Treforest (6)	2–2 (3–4 p)	Cwmbach Royal Stars SC (6)
Afan United (4)	6–4	Sifil (4)
AFC Wattstown (5)	1–2	Blaenavon Blues (3)
Brecon Corries (3)	1–4	Cefn Cribwr (3)
Nantyglo (5)	1–1 (0–3 p)	Penygraig United (5)
Pure Swansea (3)	7–1	Newport Corinthians (4)
Aberdare Town (6)	0–1	Caerphilly Athletic (3)
Cwmcarn Athletic (5)	1–3	Pontyclun (4)
Pentwynmawr Athletic (5)	2–0	Nelson Cavaliers (6)
Treorchy BGC (6)	2–8	Morriston Town (3)
Clydach (3)	2–0	Clwb Cymric (4)
Dinas Powys (5)	2–1	Croesyceiliog (3)
Pill (4)	3–1	Llanrumney United (6)
Ynysygerwn (3)	0–2	AFC Llwydcoed (3)
Grange Albion (6)	1–1 (4–5 p)	Port Talbot Town (4)
Glynneath Town (5)	2–1	Margam Youth Centre (6)
Llandarcy (4)	1–3	Lliswerry (3)
Tata Steel United (5)	2–1	Ynystawe Athletic (4)
24 August 2025
Rhydyfelin (7)	2–9	Garden Village (4)

== First round ==
The 57 second qualifying round winners and 17 lowest-ranked Tier 2 teams from the previous season entered the first round. The draw was made on 28 August 2025. Cwm Welfare and Cwmbach Royal Stars SC (both from Tier 6) were the lowest-ranked teams remaining in the competition. Matches were played on the weekend of 19 September 2025.

=== North ===
Home team	Score	Away team
19 September 2025
Broughton United (4)	1–1 (3–2 p)	Welshpool Town (4)
20 September 2025
Rhostyllen (4)	5–2	Nefyn United (4)
Llannefydd (3)	5–1	Llanberis (4)
Berriew (4)	0–2	Trearddur Bay (3)
Brickfield Rangers (2)	3–1	NFA (3)
Bow Street (3)	4–2	Cefn Albion (3)
Pwllheli (3)	1–3	Rhyl 1879 (2)
Caersws (2)	6–1	Hawarden Rangers (4)
Holyhead Hotspur (2)	4–0	Forden United (4)
Saltney Town (4)	3–7	Gresford Athletic (2)
Llanrug United (4)	3–3 (4–1 p)	Ruthin Town (2)
Porthmadog (3)	– (Note: Abandoned with Denbigh Town leading 4–1)	Denbigh Town (2)
Penrhyncoch (2)	2–0	Sychdyn United (5)
Llanfair United (3)	1–2	Kinmel Bay (4)
St Asaph City (3)	0–6	Bangor City 1876 (3)
24 September 2025
Porthmadog (3)	2–2 (11–10 p)	Denbigh Town (2)
27 September 2025
Dolgellau Athletic (3)	8–3	FC Queens Park (4)

=== South ===
Home team	Score	Away team
19 September 2025
Afan Lido (2)	3–2	Evans & Williams (3)
20 September 2025
Cardiff Draconians (2)	4–2	Cwmbran Celtic (2)
Cwmbrân Town (3)	4–4 (3–2 p)	Ynyshir Albions (2)
Rhayader Town (4)	0–4	Cefn Cribwr (3)
Abercarn United (3)	1–2	Pure Swansea (3)
Pontyclun (4)	4–1	Tata Steel United (5)
Penydarren BGC (4)	0–5	Caerau (Ely) (2)
Caerphilly Athletic (3)	1–3	Caldicot Town (3)
Morriston Town (3)	0–0 (7–6 p)	Clydach (3)
Penrhiwceiber Rangers (3)	7–0	Pentwynmawr Athletic (5)
Tredegar Town (3)	1–3	Glynneath Town (5)
Pill (4)	w/o	Treowen Stars (2)
Dinas Powys (5)	3–1	Afan United (4)
Llantwit Major (2)	2–0	Baglan Dragons (2)
Port Talbot Town (4)	2–1	Seven Sisters Onllwyn (3)
Taff's Well (3)	2–1	Abertillery Excelsiors (4)
Cwmbach Royal Stars SC (6)	3–3 (2–3 p)	Garden Village (4)
Blaenavon Blues (3)	4–1	Canton (3)
Penygraig United (5)	2–2 (4–3 p)	Cwm Welfare (6)
Goytre United (3)	1–1 (7–6 p)	Ammanford (2)
27 September 2025
AFC Llwydcoed (3)	3–1	Lliswerry (3)

== Second round ==
The 37 first round winners, the 15 highest-ranked Tier 2 teams from the previous season, and the 12 teams of the 2025–26 Cymru Premier entered the second round. The draw was made on 25 September 2025. Dinas Powys, Glynneath Town, and Penygraig United (all from Tier 5) were the lowest-ranked teams remaining in the competition. Matches were played on the weekend of 17 October 2025.

=== North ===
Home team	Score	Away team
17 October 2025
Colwyn Bay (1)	5–0	Kinmel Bay (4)
Llandudno (2)	3–0	Flint Mountain (2)
18 October 2025
Holywell Town (2)	3–2	Rhostyllen (4)
Bangor City 1876 (3)	1–1 (4–3 p)	Guilsfield (2)
Bow Street (3)	0–3	Flint Town United (1)
Caersws (2)	0–1	Dolgellau Athletic (3)
Porthmadog (3)	0–0 (4–1 p)	Buckley Town (2)
Gresford Athletic (2)	9–0	Llanrug United (4)
Rhyl 1879 (2)	1–0	Brickfield Rangers (2)
Holyhead Hotspur (2)	2–5	Airbus UK Broughton (2)
Bala Town (1)	0–3	Connah's Quay Nomads (1)
Broughton United (4)	0–6	Trearddur Bay (3)
Mold Alexandra (2)	1–2	The New Saints (1)
Newtown (2)	0–3	Caernarfon Town (1)
Llannefydd (3)	1–1 (1–3 p)	Penrhyncoch (2)

=== South ===
Home team	Score	Away team
17 October 2025
Llanelli Town (1)	3–0	Haverfordwest County (1)
Goytre United (3)	0–6	Cambrian United (2)
Pontypridd United (2)	3–1	Cefn Cribwr (3)
18 October 2025
Garden Village (4)	2–4	Glynneath Town (5)
Dinas Powys (5)	1–3	Cardiff Draconians (2)
AFC Llwydcoed (3)	2–5	Treowen Stars (2)
Newport City (2)	3–1	Penygraig United (5)
Aberystwyth Town (2)	0–5	Barry Town United (1)
Llantwit Major (2)	1–1 (7–8 p)	Cwmbrân Town (3)
Cardiff Metropolitan University (1)	5–1	Taff's Well (3)
Port Talbot Town (4)	3–1	Afan Lido (2)
Carmarthen Town (2)	5–1	Trethomas Bluebirds (2)
Caerau (Ely) (2)	3–0	Morriston Town (3)
Caldicot Town (3)	0–2	Penrhiwceiber Rangers (3)
Pure Swansea (3)	1–6	Trefelin Boys & Girls (2)
Briton Ferry Llansawel (1)	0–5	Penybont (1)
25 October 2025
Blaenavon Blues (3)	4–2	Pontyclun (4)

== Third round ==
The 32 second round winners entered the third round. The draw was made on 23 October 2025. Glynneath Town (from Tier 5) were the lowest-ranked team remaining in the competition. Matches were played on the weekend of 21 November 2025.

Home team	Score	Away team
21 November 2025
Cambrian United (2)	1–3	Penybont (1)
Llandudno (2)	2–1	Connah's Quay Nomads (1)
Cardiff Metropolitan University (1)	2–1	The New Saints (1)
Llanelli Town (1)	0–6	Barry Town United (1)
22 November 2025
Carmarthen Town (2)	1–3	Colwyn Bay (1)
Treowen Stars (2)	1–1 (3–4 p)	Pontypridd United (2)
Bangor City 1876 (3)	2–1	Holywell Town (2)
Glynneath Town (5)	2–5	Trearddur Bay (3)
Dolgellau Athletic (3)	0–2	Caerau (Ely) (2)
Caernarfon Town (1)	4–0	Penrhyncoch (2)
Porthmadog (3)	3–2	Port Talbot Town (4)
Rhyl 1879 (2)	3–2	Cwmbrân Town (3)
Penrhiwceiber Rangers (3)	0–3	Gresford Athletic (2)
Flint Town United (1)	1–0	Airbus UK Broughton (2)
23 November 2025
Newport City (2)	2–2 (5–4 p)	Blaenavon Blues (3)
29 November 2025
Trefelin Boys & Girls (2)	3–3 (4–2 p)	Cardiff Draconians (2)

== Fourth round ==
The 16 third round winners entered the fourth round. The draw was made on 27 November 2025. Bangor City 1876, Porthmadog, and Trearddur Bay (all from Tier 3) were the lowest-ranked teams remaining in the competition. Matches were played on 13 December 2025.

Home team	Score	Away team
13 December 2025
Barry Town United (1)	4–0	Gresford Athletic (2)
Cardiff Metropolitan University (1)	2–4	Caernarfon Town (1)
Porthmadog (3)	1–2	Rhyl 1879 (2)
Trearddur Bay (3)	5–3	Newport City (2)
Caerau (Ely) (2)	2–1	Llandudno (2)
Pontypridd United (2)	0–3	Colwyn Bay (1)
Bangor City 1876 (3)	2–0	Trefelin Boys & Girls (2)
Penybont (1)	0–0 (3–4 p)	Flint Town United (1)

== Quarter-finals ==
The eight fourth round winners entered the quarter-finals. The draw was made on 15 December 2025. Bangor City 1876 and Trearddur Bay (both from Tier 3) were the lowest-ranked teams remaining in the competition. Matches were played on 31 January 2026.

Home team	Score	Away team
31 January 2026
Rhyl 1879 (2)	2–1	Barry Town United (1)
Bangor City 1876 (3)	3–1	Caerau (Ely) (2)
Flint Town United (1)	3–0	Trearddur Bay (3)
Caernarfon Town (1)	4–1	Colwyn Bay (1)

== Semi-finals ==
The four quarter-final winners entered the semi-finals. The draw was made on 9 February 2026. Bangor City 1876 (Tier 3) were the lowest-ranked team remaining in the competition. The matches were played on the weekend of 7 March 2026.

Home team	Score	Away team
7 March 2026
Flint Town United (1)	5–1	Bangor City 1876 (3)
8 March 2026
Rhyl 1879 (2)	1–2	Caernarfon Town (1)

== Final ==
The final was held between the two semi-final winners.

12 April 2026
15:15 BST

Caernarfon Town	3–0	Flint Town United
Bradley 8'; Jones 13'; Cieślewicz 20'	Report

Rodney Parade, Newport
Attendance: 2,224
Referee: Iwan Griffith

== Season statistics ==
=== Hat-trick ===
As of 12 April 2026

Player	For	Against	Result	Date	Notes
(Wales) Alex Berrow	Blaenavon Blues	The Baglan	7–0 (H)	26 July 2025	First Qualifying Round
(Wales) Zac Davies	Penycae	Kerry	1–7 (A)	26 July 2025	First Qualifying Round
(Wales) Gruffudd Edwards	CPD Cerrigydrudion	Llangoed & District	3–1 (H)	26 July 2025	First Qualifying Round
(Wales) Louis Gizzi	Rhos United	CPD Pentraeth	6–0 (H)	26 July 2025	First Qualifying Round
(Wales) Cole Greenhaf^{4}	Caldicot Town	Albion Rovers	0–11 (A)	26 July 2025	First Qualifying Round
(Nigeria) Akorede Hamzat^{4}	Rhydyfelin	Aberystwyth Exiles	9–1 (H)	26 July 2025	First Qualifying Round
(England) Jack Hoyle	Knighton Town	Penyffordd Lions	1–6 (A)	26 July 2025	First Qualifying Round
(Wales) Rhys Hughes	Bow Street	CPD Cefni	0–4 (A)	26 July 2025	First Qualifying Round
(Wales) Iwan John	Caerphilly Athletic	Cwrt Rawlin	4–1 (H)	26 July 2025	First Qualifying Round
(Wales) Tomas Lilley	St Joseph FC (Swansea)	Alway	5–1 (H)	26 July 2025	First Qualifying Round
(Wales) Adam Lloyd^{4}	Coedpoeth United	CPD Deiniolen	6–3 (A)	26 July 2025	First Qualifying Round
(Wales) Macauley Morgan	Aberdare Town	Pentyrch Rangers	6–3 (H)	26 July 2025	First Qualifying Round
(Wales) Joseph Pelosi	Seven Sisters Onllwyn	Talbot Green	0–5 (A)	26 July 2025	First Qualifying Round
(Wales) Morgan Thomas	Llandudno Amateurs	CPD Henllan	2–9 (A)	26 July 2025	First Qualifying Round
(Wales) Jayden Ward^{5}	Newport Corinthians	Hay St Mary's	12–0 (H)	26 July 2025	First Qualifying Round
(Wales) Osian Williams	Penycae	Kerry	1–7 (A)	26 July 2025	First Qualifying Round
(Wales) Rhydian Williams	CPD Llannefydd	Bontnewydd	1–5 (A)	26 July 2025	First Qualifying Round
(Wales) Sebastian Thomas^{4}	Taffs Well	Undy	4–5 (A)	22 August 2025	Second Qualifying Round
(Wales) Jordan Walker	CPD Sychdyn United	Lex XI	4–1 (H)	22 August 2025	Second Qualifying Round
(Wales) Casey Coughlin	Pure Swansea	Newport Corinthians	7–1 (H)	23 August 2025	Second Qualifying Round
(Wales) Luke Harris	Morriston Town	Treorchy BGC	2–8 (A)	23 August 2025	Second Qualifying Round
(England) Tom Hilditch^{4}	Trearddur Bay	Llangefni Town	3–5 (A)	23 August 2025	Second Qualifying Round
(England) Michael Latham	FC Queens Park	CPD Cerrigydrudion	0–7 (A)	23 August 2025	Second Qualifying Round
(England) Jamie Reed	Bangor City 1876	Conwy Borough Swifts	0–12 (A)	23 August 2025	Second Qualifying Round
(Wales) Harrison Davies^{5}	Garden Village	Rhydyfelin	2–9 (A)	24 August 2025	Second Qualifying Round
(Wales) Adam Campbell	Garden Village	Cwmbach Royal Stars	3–3 (A)	20 September 2025	First Round
(Wales) Callum Francis	Caersws	Hawarden Rangers	6–1 (H)	20 September 2025	First Round
(Wales) Gerwyn Williams^{4}	Dolgellau AA	FC Queens Park	8–3 (H)	27 September 2025	First Round
(England) Ollie Hulbert	Barry Town United	Aberystwyth Town	0–5 (A)	18 October 2025	Second Round
(Wales) Jasper Jones	Treflin	Pure Swansea	1–6 (A)	18 October 2025	Second Round
(Wales) Jasper Payne	Cardiff Met	Taffs Well	5–1 (H)	18 October 2025	Second Round
(Wales) Iwan Roberts	Gresford Athletic	Llanrug United	9–0 (H)	18 October 2025	Second Round
(Wales) Jake Roberts	Gresford Athletic	Llanrug United	9–0 (H)	18 October 2025	Second Round
(Wales) James Crole	Penybont	Cambrian United	3–1 (A)	21 November 2025	Third Round
(England) Tom Hilditch	Trearddur Bay	Glynneath Town	5–2 (A)	22 November 2025	Third Round
(Wales) Josh Lock	Caernarfon Town	Penrhyncoch	4–0 (H)	22 November 2025	Third Round
(England) Aaron Williams	Colwyn Bay	Pontypridd United	3–0 (A)	13 December 2025	Fourth Round

Notes

(H) – Home team
(A) – Away team
^{4} – player scored 4 goals
^{5} – player scored 5 goals
