= 2024–25 Welsh Cup =

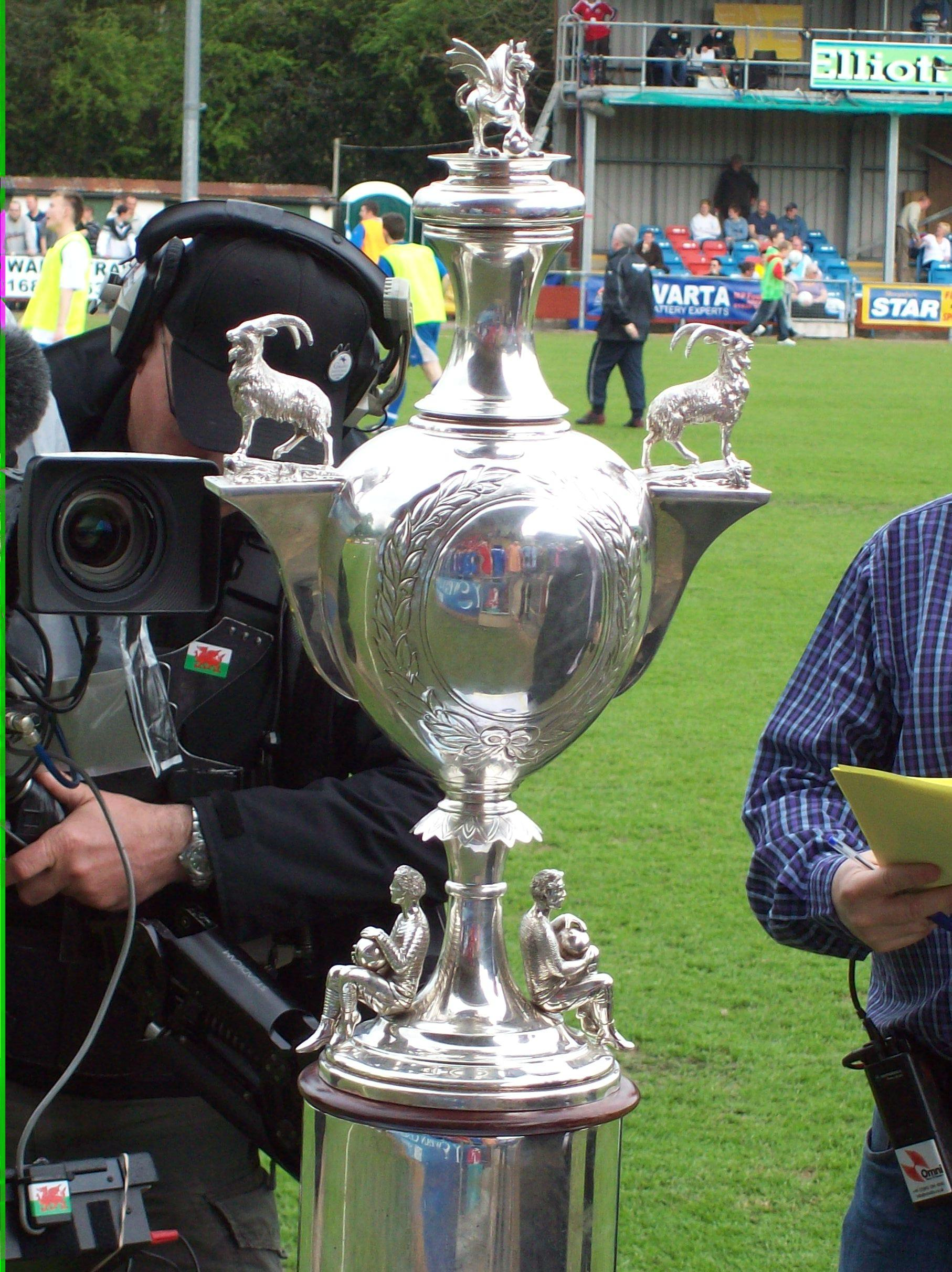
- The Welsh Cup

Tournament details
- Country: Wales

Final positions
- Champions: The New Saints (10th title)
- Runners-up: Connah's Quay Nomads

The 2024–25 FAW Welsh Cup was the 137th season of the annual knockout tournament for competitive football teams in Wales. The winners qualified for the 2025–26 UEFA Conference League first qualifying round.

The New Saints won the cup on 4 May 2025 (their tenth Welsh Cup win), defeating defending holders Connah's Quay Nomads 2–1 in the final. Since they qualified for the Conference League based on league position, the spot for winning the cup was passed to the second-placed team of the 2024–25 Cymru Premier.

== First qualifying round ==
Teams from the third tier of Welsh football and below entered the competition in the first qualifying round, with the exception of Abertillery Bluebirds, Pontardawe Town and Porthmadog, who received a bye based on their league position in the previous season. The draw was made on 4 July 2024, with matches played on 26 and 27 July.

=== North ===
Tie	Home team	Score	Away team
1	Holyhead Town	0–2	Bontnewydd
2	Castell Alun Colts	2–2 (4–5 p)	Blaenau Ffestiniog Amateur
3	Berriew	4–0	FC Plas Madoc
4	Y Felinheli	6–0	Greenfield
5	Llanrug United	3–4	Connah's Quay Town
6	Cerrigydrudion	3–1	Pentraeth
7	Prestatyn Sports	1–3	Glan Conwy
8	Llandrindod Wells	5–0	Mountain Rangers
9	Lex XI	2–3	Corwen
10	Llansantffraid Village	3–2	Y Glannau
11	Kinmel Bay	6–0	Llandyrnog United
12	Amlwch Town	3–1	Bethesda Rovers
13	Llanuwchllyn	5–1	Forden United
14	Rhostyllen	5–2	Four Crosses
15	Cemaes Bay	3–2	Bow Street
16	Montgomery Town	2–1	Abermule
17	Gronant	1–1 (3–5 p)	Llanystumdwy
18	Llangollen Town	6–0	Holywell United
19	Rhyl 1879	9–0	Llandudno Swifts
20	FC Queens Park	3–0	Nantlle Vale
21	Llanfair United	3–3 (3–5 p)	Gaerwen
22	Llanerchymedd	1–3	Llansannan
23	Bow	1–1 (5–4 p)	Dolgellau AA
24	Rhuddlan Town	1–3	Penyffordd Lions
25	Llanfairfechan Town	0–0 (4–3 p)	Llanfairpwll
26	Kerry	1–3	Pwllheli
27	Rhos United	0–4	Llanrwst United
28	Llannefydd	4–1	Llanilar
29	Brymbo	3–6	Bethesda Athletic
30	Rhydymwyn	4–3	Rhyl Albion
31	Caerwys	w/o	Llandudno Amateurs
32	Barmouth & Dyffryn United	1–1 (4–5 p)	Penmaenmawr Phoenix
33	Penrhyndeudraeth	1–0	Llanidloes Town
34	Felinfach	1–3	Chirk AAA
35	Holyhead Hotspur	10–0	Valley
36	Llanberis	3–3 (7–6 p)	Sychdyn United
37	Trearddur Bay	4–0	Waterloo Rovers
38	Conwy Borough	3–2	Meliden
39	Rhos Aelwyd	2–2 (4–3 p)	Gwalchmai
40	Glantraeth	0–2	Penycae
41	Llangoed	0–4	Llangefni Town
42	Knighton Town	0–4	Cefn Albion
43	St Asaph City	4–0	Cefni
44	Caergybi	0–3	NFA
45	Menai Bridge Tigers	w/o	Penparcau
46	Llysfaen	1–5	Talysarn Celts
47	Cei Connah	3–5	Henllan
48	Mynydd Isa	0–6	Brickfield Rangers
49	Saltney Town	0–2	Llanrhaeadr
50	Boded	3–2	Mochdre Sports
51	Nefyn United	4–2	Welshpool Town
52	Bro Cernyw	3–2	Machynlleth
53	Carno	2–1	Radnor Valley

=== South ===
Tie	Home team	Score	Away team
1	AFC Bargoed	2–1	PILCS
2	Morriston Town	4–1	Clase Social
3	Undy	1–5	Penlan
4	Abergavenny Town	3–5	Treherbert
5	Clydach Wasps	3–4	Cardiff Bay Warriors
6	AFC Pontymister	0–5	Bettws
7	Aber Valley	2–1	Canton Rangers
8	Carn Rovers	0–7	Pantyscallog Village
9	Ynystawe Athletic	3–3 (7–8 p)	Seaside
10	FC Porthcawl	1–2	Pencoed Athletic
11	Nelson Cavaliers	2–3	West End
12	Marshfield	2–4	Risca United
13	Ton Pentre	0–3	Ely Rangers
14	Treforest	2–1	CK Swiss Valley
15	Tonyrefail	1–3	Cwmamman United
16	Cardiff Airport	5–0	Llangennech
17	Ynyshir Albions	1–2	Cardiff Draconians
18	Giants Grave	2–4	St Josephs
19	Nantyglo	2–3	Bryn Rovers
20	Pentwynmawr Athletic	1–6	Croesyceiliog
21	Lliswerry	1–2	Monmouth Town
22	Caerphilly Athletic	8–1	St Athan
23	Blaenavon Blues	2–2 (5–4 p)	Treharris Athletic Western
24	Cwrt y Vil	w/o	Cefn Cribwr
25	Cascade YC	5–1	Wattsville
26	Seven Sisters Onllwyn	2–0	Risca Town
27	Caldicot Town	5–1	Blaen-y-Maes
28	Sifil	2–4	Newport Corinthians
29	Abertillery Excelsiors	0–3	Penydarren BGC
30	Cwmbach Royal Stars	0–2	Goytre
31	Tredegar Town	2–3	New Inn
32	Aberdare Town	3–1	Tongwynlais
33	Cwmbran Town	w/o	Cefn Fforest
34	AFC Llwydcoed	3–0	AFC Penrhiwceiber
35	Abercarn United	1–2	Canton
36	Clwb Cymric	3–0	Llanrumney United
37	Ynysygerwn	4–1	Pontarddulais Town
38	Evans & Williams	1–1 (4–3 p)	Llantwit Fardre
39	Llangeinor	5–2	Treowen Stars
40	Pill	7–1	Garw
41	Dinas Powys	1–4	Rogerstone
42	Sully Sports	4–4 (4–5 p)	Cwm Wanderers
43	South Gower	3–3 (2–4 p)	Cwrt Rawlin
44	Cardiff Corinthians	w/o	Ferndale BGC
45	Vale United	2–3	Chepstow Town
46	FC Cwmaman	5–1	Rhydyfelin
47	Holton Road	3–0	Bridgend Street
48	Cwmcarn Athletic	0–3	Newport Saints
49	Ffostrasol Wanderers	4–1	Glynneath Town
50	Brynna	0–6	Porthcawl Town Athletic
51	Swansea University	5–1	AFC Wattstown
52	Dafen Welfare	8–1	Cornelly United
53	Clydach	8–3	Tregaron Turfs
54	Pontyclun	3–2	Penygraig United
55	Builth Wells	1–1 (4–2 p)	Brecon Corries
56	Port Talbot Town	10–3	Llanrumney Athletic

== Second qualifying round ==
The 109 first qualifying round winners and 3 teams given byes entered the second qualifying round. The draw was made on 31 July 2024, with the matches played on 23 and 24 August.

=== North ===
Tie	Home team	Score	Away team
1	Rhostyllen (4)	2–3	St Asaph City (3)
2	NFA (3)	3–1	Henllan (5)
3	Rhyl 1879 (3)	6–0	Glan Conwy (4)
4	FC Queens Park (4)	3–1	Blaenau Ffestiniog Amateur (5)
5	Llansannan (4)	2–2 (5–4 p)	Conwy Borough (3)
6	Llannefydd (3)	4–2	Penyffordd Lions (4)
7	Llanrhaeadr (4)	3–1	Llanystumdwy (4)
8	Llanuwchllyn (3)	10–0	Berriew (4)
9	Montgomery Town (4)	1–4	Corwen (3)
10	Connah's Quay Town (3)	2–4	Brickfield Rangers (3)
11	Cerrigydrudion (4)	3–1	Llansantffraid Village (3)
12	Holyhead Hotspur (3)	4–2	Bethesda Athletic (4)
13	Nefyn United (4)	3–3 (2–4 p)	Menai Bridge Tigers (3)
14	Talysarn Celts (4)	1–0	Llandrindod Wells (3)
15	Bro Cernyw (4)	0–3	Llandudno Amateurs (4)
16	Amlwch Town (5)	0–5	Porthmadog (3)
17	Kinmel Bay (4)	3–2	Bow (4)
18	Llangollen Town (3)	2–0	Y Felinheli (3)
19	Trearddur Bay (3)	7–0	Llanfairfechan Town (4)
20	Carno (4)	2–1	Penycae (3)
21	Penmaenmawr Phoenix (4)	5–2	Pwllheli (3)
22	Cefn Albion (3)	6–3	Penrhyndeudraeth (4)
23	Llanberis (4)	4–1	Bontnewydd (5)
24	Rhos Aelwyd (3)	0–2	Gaerwen (5)
25	Cemaes Bay (4)	0–3	Llanrwst United (3)
26	Llangefni Town (3)	7–3	Chirk AAA (3)
27	Rhydymwyn (5)	3–1	Boded (4)

=== South ===
Tie	Home team	Score	Away team
1	Blaenavon Blues (3)	1–4	Cardiff Corinthians (3)
2	Builth Wells (3)	3–0	Cefn Cribwr (3)
3	Goytre (3)	1–1 (4–2 p)	Pontyclun (3)
4	Cardiff Draconians (3)	4–0	Bettws (5)
5	Aberdare Town (5)	0–1	Newport Corinthians (3)
6	Rogerstone (4)	5–1	Dafen Welfare (4)
7	Clwb Cymric (5)	2–1	Cwm Wanderers (4)
8	Monmouth Town (4)	1–1 (5–4 p)	Seven Sisters Onllwyn (3)
9	Ffostrasol Wanderers (4)	1–2	Pencoed Athletic (4)
10	Treherbert (3)	3–2	Pantyscallog Village (6)
11	Morriston Town (3)	1–0	Port Talbot Town (4)
12	Holton Road (6)	3–6	Pill (4)
13	Ely Rangers (4)	5–2	Treforest (5)
14	St Josephs (4)	13–0	AFC Bargoed (7)
15	FC Cwmaman (4)	1–2	Cwmamman United (4)
16	Clydach (3)	2–2 (1–3 p)	West End (4)
17	New Inn (4)	3–2	Evans & Williams (3)
18	Abertillery Bluebirds (3)	3–2	Cascade YC (7)
19	Cardiff Bay Warriors (5)	7–3	Cwrt Rawlin (6)
20	Cwmbran Town (4)	3–0	Llangeinor (6)
21	Penlan (4)	2–2 (5–6 p)	Caldicot Town (3)
22	Porthcawl Town Athletic (4)	4–1	Newport Saints (4)
23	Risca United (3)	3–0	Seaside (4)
24	Ynysygerwn (3)	4–3	Cardiff Airport (4)
25	AFC Llwydcoed (3)	4–2	Croesyceiliog (3)
26	Pontardawe Town (3)	3–4	Aber Valley (4)
27	Penydarren BGC (4)	5–0	Canton (3)
28	Bryn Rovers (4)	3–5	Chepstow Town (3)
29	Swansea University (3)	1–1 (6–5 p)	Caerphilly Athletic (4)

== First round ==
The 56 second qualifying round winners and teams in Tier 2 entered the first round. The draw was made on 28 August 2024, with the matches played on 20 and 21 September.

The following teams received byes based on league position during the previous season:

- 2024–25 Cymru North (2): Airbus UK Broughton, Bangor 1876, Colwyn Bay, Denbigh Town, Guilsfield, Holywell Town, Mold Alexandra and Ruthin Town
- 2024–25 Cymru South (2): Afan Lido, Ammanford, Caerau (Ely), Cambrian United, Carmarthen Town, Goytre United, Llanelli Town and Pontypridd United

=== North ===
Tie	Home team	Score	Away team
1	Corwen (3)	0–1	Llay Welfare (2)
2	Llandudno (2)	4–0	Llanberis (4)
3	Llannefydd (3)	1–0	Rhydymwyn (5)
4	Penrhyncoch (2)	2–1	Talysarn Celts (4)
5	Llandudno Amateurs (4)	0–4	Holyhead Hotspur (3)
6	Buckley Town (2)	7–2	Builth Wells (3)
7	St Asaph City (3)	0–2	Llangollen Town (3)
8	Caersws (2)	5–0	Cefn Albion (3)
9	Llansannan (4)	0–2	Cerrigydrudion (4)
10	Carno (4)	0–4	Llanrhaeadr (4)
11	Llanrwst United (3)	5–1	Menai Bridge Tigers (3)
12	Gresford Athletic (2)	9–0	Prestatyn Town (2)
13	Kinmel Bay (4)	3–1	Brickfield Rangers (3)
14	FC Queens Park (4)	1–6	Porthmadog (3)
15	Trearddur Bay (3)	2–1	NFA (3)
16	Llangefni Town (3)	7–1	Gaerwen (5)
17	Penmaenmawr Phoenix (4)	1–2	Llanuwchllyn (3)
18	Rhyl 1879 (3)	1–1 (4–1 p)	Flint Mountain (2)

=== South ===
Tie	Home team	Score	Away team
1	Cardiff Corinthians (3)	4–1	Risca United (3)
2	Chepstow Town (3)	0–1	Pill (4)
3	St Josephs (4)	0–3	Cardiff Draconians (3)
4	Goytre (3)	3–1	Pencoed Athletic (4)
5	Newport Corinthians (3)	1–0	AFC Llwydcoed (3)
6	Penrhiwceiber Rangers (2)	3–1	Cwmbran Town (4)
7	Cardiff Bay Warriors (5)	2–0	West End (4)
8	Taff's Well (2)	0–1	Trethomas Bluebirds (2)
9	Treherbert (3)	1–1 (3–5 p)	Clwb Cymric (5)
10	Caldicot Town (3)	1–2	Morriston Town (3)
11	New Inn (4)	1–1 (4–2 p)	Abertillery Bluebirds (3)
12	Aber Valley (4)	3–1	Cwmamman United (4)
13	Ynysygerwn (3)	1–3	Rogerstone (4)
14	Penydarren BGC (4)	3–3 (4–1 p)	Porthcawl Town Athletic (4)
15	Monmouth Town (4)	2–0	Newport City (2)
16	Llantwit Major (2)	3–2	Ely Rangers (4)
17	Cwmbran Celtic (2)	3–4	Trefelin BGC (2)
18	Swansea University (3)	5–1	Baglan Dragons (2)

== Second round ==
The 36 first round winners, the 16 teams given first round byes, and the 12 teams from the 2024–25 Cymru Premier entered the second round. The draw was made on 25 September 2024, with the matches played on 18, 19, 22 and 26 October.

=== North ===
Tie	Home team	Score	Away team
1	Bangor 1876 (2)	2–1	Llay Welfare (2)
2	Bala Town (1)	3–1	Llanrhaeadr (4)
3	Llannefydd (3)	1–2	Trearddur Bay (3)
4	Llanrwst United (3)	2–1	Cerrigydrudion (4)
5	Connah's Quay Nomads (1)	5–0	Guilsfield (2)
6	Denbigh Town (2)	4–2	Llangefni Town (3)
7	The New Saints (1)	16–0	Llangollen Town (3)
8	Porthmadog (3)	0–2	Airbus UK Broughton (2)
9	Holywell Town (2)	1–1 (4–5 p)	Ruthin Town (2)
10	Llanuwchllyn (3)	0–0 (5–3 p)	Newtown (1)
11	Caersws (2)	7–4	Rhyl 1879 (3)
12	Holyhead Hotspur (3)	0–0 (6–5 p)	Caernarfon Town (1)
13	Buckley Town (2)	2–2 (5–6 p)	Colwyn Bay (2)
14	Penrhyncoch (2)	1–3	Mold Alexandra (2)
15	Flint Town United (1)	5–1	Gresford Athletic (2)
16	Llandudno (2)	4–3	Kinmel Bay (4)

=== South ===
Tie	Home team	Score	Away team
1	Barry Town United (1)	3–3 (2–4 p)	Caerau (Ely) (2)
2	Cardiff Bay Warriors (5)	2–4	Rogerstone (4)
3	Cardiff Corinthians (3)	3–3 (2–4 p)	Afan Lido (2)
4	Penybont (1)	0–1	Cardiff Metropolitan University (1)
5	Goytre (3)	1–0	Cardiff Draconians (3)
6	Cambrian United (2)	0–0 (5–4 p)	Goytre United (2)
7	Haverfordwest County (1)	0–0 (5–3 p)	Trethomas Bluebirds (2)
8	Clwb Cymric (5)	0–3	Llanelli Town (2)
9	Aberystwyth Town (1)	0–1	Ammanford (2)
10	Penrhiwceiber Rangers (2)	3–4	Carmarthen Town (2)
11	Penydarren BGC (4)	2–0	Pontypridd United (2)
12	Monmouth Town (4)	2–3	Pill (4)
13	New Inn (4)	0–3	Briton Ferry Llansawel (1)
14	Trefelin BGC (2)	5–0	Newport Corinthians (3)
15	Llantwit Major (2)	1–1 (5–6 p)	Morriston Town (3)
16	Aber Valley (4)	0–2	Swansea University (3)

== Third round ==
The 32 second round winners entered the third round. The draw was made on 23 October 2024, with the matches played on 15 and 16 November.

Tie	Home team	Score	Away team
1	Cardiff Metropolitan University (1)	1–3	The New Saints (1)
2	Caerau (Ely) (2)	8–1	Rogerstone (4)
3	Trefelin BGC (2)	1–2	Connah's Quay Nomads (1)
4	Colwyn Bay (2)	2–1	Ruthin Town (2)
5	Caersws (2)	2–1	Bangor 1876 (2)
6	Llanrwst United (3)	0–3	Denbigh Town (2)
7	Penydarren BGC (4)	2–2 (3–4 p)	Carmarthen Town (2)
8	Airbus UK Broughton (2)	7–1	Goytre (3)
9	Flint Town United (1)	2–2 (2–4 p)	Bala Town (1)
10	Ammanford (2)	1–1 (9–10 p)	Haverfordwest County (1)
11	Mold Alexandra (2)	2–1	Briton Ferry Llansawel (1)
12	Cambrian United (2)	3–2	Llandudno (2)
13	Holyhead Hotspur (3)	0–0 (5–4 p)	Trearddur Bay (3)
14	Llanuwchllyn (3)	3–0	Swansea University (3)
15	Llanelli Town (2)	4–0	Pill (4)
16	Afan Lido (2)	1–1 (6–5 p)	Morriston Town (3)

== Fourth round ==
The 16 third round winners entered the fourth round. The draw was made on 20 November 2024, with the matches played on 13, 14 and 15 December.

Tie	Home team	Score	Away team
1	Afan Lido (2)	0–0 (1–3 p)	Cambrian United (2)
2	The New Saints (1)	4–1	Colwyn Bay (2)
3	Haverfordwest County (1)	0–2	Llanelli Town (2)
4	Carmarthen Town (2)	0–0 (4–3 p)	Holyhead Hotspur (3)
5	Denbigh Town (2)	7–1	Llanuwchllyn (3)
6	Caerau (Ely) (2)	1–0	Bala Town (1)
7	Airbus UK Broughton (2)	2–0	Caersws (2)
8	Connah's Quay Nomads (1)	1–0	Mold Alexandra (2)

== Quarter-finals ==
The eight fourth round winners entered the quarter-finals. The draw was made on 18 December 2024, with the matches played on 15 and 16 February 2025.

Tie	Home team	Score	Away team
1	Denbigh Town (2)	0–1	Llanelli Town (2)
2	Caerau (Ely) (2)	0–2	Connah's Quay Nomads (1)
3	The New Saints (1)	5–0	Airbus UK Broughton (2)
4	Cambrian United (2)	3–1	Carmarthen Town (2)

== Semi-finals ==
The four quarter-final winners entered the semi-finals. The draw was made on 19 February 2025, with the matches played on 15 and 16 March 2025.

Tie	Home team	Score	Away team
1	Cambrian United (2)	0–5	The New Saints (1)
2	Connah's Quay Nomads (1)	2–1	Llanelli Town (2)

== Final ==
The final was held between the two semi-final winners.

4 May 2025
16:00

The New Saints	2–1	Connah's Quay Nomads
Holden 17'; Williams 54'	Report	Poole 8'

Rodney Parade, Newport
Attendance: 1,313
Referee: Tom Owen
