= Llysfaen F.C. =

Football club based in Llysfaen

Llysfaen
- Full name: Llysfaen Football Club
- Nickname: The Faen
- Founded: 2013
- Ground: The Bananabeu
- Manager: Gaz Dentith and Gaz Sorfleet
- League: North Wales Coast East Division One
- 2025–26: North Wales Coast East One, 8th of 9
Home colours	Away colours

Llysfaen Football Club is a Welsh football club based in Llysfaen, Conwy. They currently play in the North Wales Coast East Division One.

== History ==
The club was formed in 2013 by Emlyn Robert Jones. The new club joined Division One of the Vale of Clwyd and Conwy Football League, but struggled early on, finishing in the bottom two in each of their first three seasons. The club then had three consecutive mid-table finishes before their first successful season. The season was going very well, until it was cut short in March 2020 due to the COVID-19 pandemic. Llysfaen were the last team in North Wales to lose their unbeaten record during the 2019–20 season, going 18 games unbeaten in all competitions. The club were behind NFA for most of the season, but went top on goal difference in January. Llysfaen finished with a record of 9 wins and 2 draws in 11 games, and NFA with a record of 10 wins and 2 draws in 12 games, so NFA won the league title by 0.03 points per game, despite Llysfaen's better goal difference.

In 2020 the club was announced to be part of the newly-formed North Wales Coast East Football League, and were placed into Division One, at the fifth tier of the Welsh football league system. Before the new season they were dealt a major blow, with striker Sean Sheridan leaving the club to join Llanfairfechan Town. Sheridan had played a major role for the team, scoring 31 goals in the previous season and also coaching the Llysfaen Lionesses women's team. However the 2020–21 season was cancelled for all leagues at tier 2 and below due to the COVID-19 pandemic, and in March 2021 it was confirmed that Sheridan would rejoin Llysfaen for the upcoming season.

In their first season in the new league, they finished 5th out of 14 teams. They also reached the semi-final of the REM Jones Cup, but lost 5–0 to Abergele. 2021–22 also marked the first time the club entered the Welsh Cup, where they would reach the second qualifying round, losing 4–0 to Llanelwy Athletic. This was followed by a 10th-place finish the following season, and an 11–0 loss to Llannefydd in the first qualifying round of the Welsh Cup.

In October 2023 long-serving manager Emlyn Robert Jones resigned and left the club. That season they had already knocked out fourth-tier Llansannan in the Welsh Cup, coming back from 2–0 down to win 3–2. His final game was a 2–1 win over Henllan. Sean Sheridan took over as interim manager. They went on to finish 7th, and lost in the second qualifying round of the Welsh Cup to Holyhead Hotspur.

Llysfaen started the 2024–25 season poorly, losing 5–1 to Talysarn Celts in the first qualifying round of the Welsh Cup. In November 2024 they appointed a new manager, James Sweetman, replacing Dan Ashton. The club finished 7th for a second consecutive season.

For the 2025–26 season the club brought in a new management team, with Gaz Dentith and Gaz Sorfleet joining the club. The team finished 8th out of 9 teams in the league. In the 2026–27 season, back-to-back 3–2 wins at home against Towyn and Bethesda Rovers saw the team qualify for the first round proper of the Welsh Cup for the first time in its history. They were again drawn at home in the first round, against Barmouth & Dyffryn United, and a 92nd minute winner from Ryan Watson confirmed a 2–1 win as the fifth-tier side progressed to the second round. In the second round they were drawn at home to Mochdre Sports, the match was played at Llanelian Road and they lost 2–0.

== Women's team ==
In 2017 the club formed a women's team, known as the Llysfaen Lionesses. They played in the North Wales Women's Recreational League. In 2025 the team became part of Colwyn Bay FC, and are now called Colwyn Bay Ladies.

== Ground ==
The club plays at a pitch known as the Bananabeu, or the Banana Pitch, on Dolwen Road in Llysfaen. Its name, a pun on the Santiago Bernabéu Stadium, comes from its sloped shape, as it slopes upwards towards both ends of the pitch.

In 2019 National Turf Solutions were appointed for improvements to the Banana Pitch.

In October 2024 the ground failed a safety test.
