= Llangennech A.F.C. =

Association football club in Wales

Llangennech
- Full name: Llangennech Association Football Club
- Founded: 1982
- Ground: Llangennech Recreation Ground
- League: West Wales Premier League
- 2025–26: West Wales Premier League, 13th of 16
Home colours	Away colours

Llangennech A.F.C. is a Welsh football club from Llangennech, a village just outside Llanelli in Carmarthenshire, Wales. They currently play in the West Wales Premier League, and previously played in the Carmarthenshire League.

The club has competed in the Welsh Cup and the WWFA Intermediate Cup.

The club also has junior teams competing in local leagues.

== History ==
Football was played in Llangennech as early as 1921. The next known team in the village was made up of workers from the Morlais Colliery in 1955. They played in the Carmarthenshire League for two seasons.

Llangennech A.F.C. was formed at the Bridgend Inn pub in 1982. In 1984 they joined the Carmarthenshire League.

In October 1990 they beat First Division title contenders Pembrey 1–0 in the Carmarthenshire League Challenge Cup first round. At the time Llangennech played in the Third Division.

In 1999 the team narrowly missed out on promotion to Division Two, by one point. For the 1999–2000 season the club's first team kit was sponsored by L&G Motors.

In the 2010–11 season they played in Division Two. In February they were fourth, separated from third place Llandeilo Town on goal difference before a 6–0 loss at home to Llandeilo.

The club first reached the top division of the league in 2023, after a second-place finish in Division One.

In the 2024–25 season they finished second in the Carmarthenshire League Premier Division, and were promoted to the West Wales Premier League.

In March 2025 the club was granted £2,000 by Swansea City through their charity SwansAid.

They reached the fourth round of the 2026–27 Welsh Cup, with wins against Llanrumney United, Cwmamman United, Cwmbran Town, Pontardawe Town and Newport City.

== Ground ==
In 1986 the club was described as sharing a pitch with the village's rugby and cricket teams.

The club plays most of its games at the Llangennech Recreation Ground.
