= Cardiff Bay Warriors F.C. =

Football club based in Cardiff

Cardiff Bay Warriors
- Full name: Cardiff Bay Warriors Football Club
- Founded: 2005
- Ground: Canal Park
- League: South Wales Premier League Championship Division
- 2024–25: South Wales Premier League Championship Division, 8th of 12

Cardiff Bay Warriors F.C. is a Welsh football club based in Butetown, Cardiff. They currently play in the South Wales Premier League Championship Division.

The club was first formed in 2005, but folded after a few years. They reformed in 2019. In 2023 they entered the Welsh football league system, taking the place of AFC Butetown in the South Wales Alliance League. In the 2024–25 Welsh Cup they reached the second round, where they lost 4–2 at home against Rogerstone.

In 2022 they won the Somali British Champions League, beating Leicester Atletico in the final.

In 2024 they won the Somali Cup in Canada.

== Honours ==
- Somali British Champions League - Winners: 2021–22
- Somali Cup - Winners: 2023–24
