= Mynydd Isa Football Club =

Association football club in Wales

Mynydd Isa FC
- Full name: Mynydd Isa Football Club
- Nickname: Isa
- Founded: 2015
- Ground: Argoed Sports and Social Club, Mynydd Isa
- Capacity: 50 seats
- Chairman: Jon Hutchinson
- Manager: Liam Evans
- League: Ardal NW League
- 2025–26: Ardal NW League, 14th of 16

Mynydd Isa Football Club (MIFC) is a Welsh football team based in Mynydd Isa, near Mold, Flintshire, Wales. The team play in the Ardal NW League.

== History ==
Mynydd Isa had previously been represented by a team, Mynydd Isa FC who rose to the second tier of football in Wales, the Cymru Alliance, before dissolving in 2009.

The current team was formed in 2015 as Ewloe Spartans but a move to the Argoed Sports and Social Club at Mynydd Isa in 2016 meant the club changed to its current name of Mynydd Isa Spartans.

In their first season as Mynydd Isa, the Spartans gained promotion to the Welsh National League (Wrexham Area) by finishing as runners-up in the 2016–17 North East Wales League.

The club joined the newly formed North East Wales Football League in 2020 as a Premier Division club.

The club were formerly known as Mynydd Isa Spartans, until the senior section of the club merged with Mynydd Isa Youth FC in June 2023.

== Honours ==
- North East Wales Football League Premier Division Champions: 2024–25
- North East Wales Football League Premier Cup Winners: 2024-25
- North East Wales League Runners-Up: 2016–17
- North East Wales Football League Mike Beech Trophy Winners: 2023-24
- North East Wales Football Association Horace Wynne Cup Runners-Up: 2023-24
- North East Wales Football League Reserve Division Winners: 2023-24, 2024-25
- North East Wales Football League Reserve Cup Winners: 2021-22, 2023-24
- North East Wales Football Association Reserve Cup Runners-Up: 2024-25
- Flintshire Youth League Under 19 Challenge Cup Winners: 2021-22
- North East Wales Football Association Youth Cup Runners-Up: 2021-22
