= Bryn Rovers A.F.C. =

Football club based in Brynamman

Bryn Rovers
- Full name: Bryn Rovers Association Football Club
- Founded: 1985
- Ground: Cae Criced
- Chairman: Andrew Jones
- Manager: Nathan Jones
- League: Neath League Division One
- 2025–26: Neath League Premier Division, 11th of 12 (relegated)
Home colours

Bryn Rovers A.F.C. is a Welsh football club based in Brynamman, Wales. The first team currently plays in the Neath League Division One.

The club has competed in the Welsh Cup in 2021–22, 2022–23, 2024–25 and 2025–26. They went out in the qualifying rounds every time.

The club were champions of the Neath & District League in the 2022–23 season, gaining promotion to the West Wales Premier League.

In November 2024 they parted company with manager Dan Williams, after a disappointing start to the season. However their form failed to improve, and they were relegated at the end of the 2024–25 season.

== Honours ==
=== First team ===
- Neath & District League Premier Division - Champions: 2022–23
- Neath & District League Premier Division - Runners-up: 2009–10
- Neath & District League Premier Division Cup - Winners: 2010–11
- Neath & District League Division One - Champions: 1994–95, 2005–06
- Neath & District League Division One Cup - Winners: 2005–06
- Neath & District League Division One Cup - Runners-up: 1999–2000, 2003–04
- Neath & District League Division Two - Champions: 1993–94
- Neath & District League Division Two - Runners-up: 2000–01
- Neath & District League Division Three - Runners-up: 1988–89
- Neath & District League Division Three Cup - Runners-up: 1988–89
- Neath & District League Division Five - Runners-up: 1986–87

=== Reserves ===
- Neath & District League Reserve Open Cup - Winners: 2006–07
- Neath & District League Reserve Division One - Champions: 2012–13
- Neath & District League Reserve Division One - Runners-up: 2007–08, 2008–09, 2011–12
- Neath & District League Reserve Division Two - Runners-up: 2002–03, 2005–06
- Neath & District League Reserve Division Two Cup - Winners: 2005–06
- Neath & District League Reserve Division Three - Champions: 2008–09
- Neath & District League Reserve Division Three - Runners-up: 1995–96, 2000–01
- Neath & District League Reserve Division Three Cup - Winners: 1999–2000
- Swansea Valley Cup - Winners: 2007–08
