= C.P.D. Cerrigydrudion =

Football club based in Cerrigydrudion

Cerrigydrudion
- Full name: Clwb Pel-Droed Cerrigydrudion
- Founded: 1963
- Ground: Cerrigydrudion Primary School
- League: North Wales Coast East Premier Division
- 2025–26: North Wales Coast East Premier Division, 8th of 12
Home colours	Away colours

C.P.D. Cerrigydrudion is a Welsh football club based in Cerrigydrudion. They currently play in the North Wales Coast East Premier Division.

The club was formed in 1963, and despite doubts being raised over the fact that no club representative attended the league's annual general meeting, Cerrigydrudion were accepted as new members of the Vale of Conway Area League in that year. They won the league title in 1979–80.

In 2020 they were placed into the newly formed North Wales Coast East Football League Division One. In 2022 they were promoted to the Premier Division as Division One runners-up, and also won the REM Jones Cup. In the 2023–24 season they were Premier Division runners-up, narrowly missing out on the league title.

The club has competed in the Welsh Cup, reaching the second round in 2024–25, where they lost 2–1 to Llanrwst United.

== Honours ==
- Vale of Conwy Football League - Champions: 1979–80
- Vale of Clwyd and Conwy Football League First Division - Champions: 2016–17
- North Wales Coast East Football League Division One - Runners-up: 2021–22
- North Wales Coast East Football League Premier Division - Runners-up: 2023–24
- REM Jones Cup - Winners: 2021–22
