= Talysarn Celts F.C. =

Football club based in Gwynedd

Talysarn Celts
- Nickname: Celts
- League: North Wales Coast West Premier Division
- 2025–26: North Wales Coast West Premier Division, 6th of 15
Home colours	Away colours

Talysarn Celts F.C. is a Welsh football club based in Talysarn, Gwynedd. The team currently plays in the North Wales Coast West Premier Division.

The club has competed in the Welsh Cup, including reaching the first round in 2024–25.

== History ==
Talysarn Celts are known to have played as early as 1921, as founder members of the Gwyrfai League.

Talysarn were founder members of the North Wales Coast West Football League in 2021, and were promoted to the Premier Division in their first season. In 2024, Talysarn applied for promotion to the Ardal Leagues, but withdrew their application.

On the opening day of the 2025–26 season they beat Glantraeth 21–1. This equalled the previous club record, a 20–0 win over Tregarth.

== Club colours ==
Talysarn Celts play in green and white hoops.

== Honours ==
- Caernarfon & District League - Champions: 1973–74
