= St Asaph City F.C. =

Association football club in Wales

Coordinates: 53°15′15.2″N 3°26′46.1″W

St Asaph City
- Nickname: The Saints
- Ground: Roe Plas
- Chairman: Dean Martins
- Manager: Dan Sleet
- League: North Wales Coast East Premier Division
- 2025–26: Ardal NW League, 16th of 16 (relegated)
Home colours	Away colours

St Asaph City Football Club (Welsh: Clwb Pêl Droed Dinas Llanelwy) is a Welsh football team based in St Asaph, Denbighshire, Wales. They play in the North Wales Coast East Premier Division.

== History ==
The first documented mention of football in St Asaph appears in a book “ Companion to Asaph”.. published in 1888. According to the author a club called St Asaph Football Club that had been in existence for some time became St Asaph Athletic Football Club in 1885. In 1887 the team reached the final of the North Wales Junior Cup. At that time the team played at Elwy Park Grove, the present venue of St Asaph Football Club.

Very little documentation exists about football in the city for much of the 20th century although it is possible that the team played in the Dyserth League for much of that time. In 1975 the Dyserth and Halkyn Leagues were amalgamated as the newly formed Clwyd League, which at the time had 5 Divisions. St Asaph finished runners-up in Division 3 in the 1976–77 season, but it appears that the club folded about 1980. The team were reformed for the 1990–91 season after ten years without a senior football team. The team had Graham Hunter and Simon Nixon as joint player managers. They were accepted back into the Premier League and had a very successful season finishing runners up in the league, winning both the President's Cup and the League Cup and runners up in the Auxiliary League. In season 1991-92 the first team finished fourth in the Clwyd Premier League and won both the Presidents Cup and the League Cup.

In the 1992–93 season the first team became Clwyd League champions and were promoted to the Welsh Alliance. The team finished mid table and were looking forward to consolidating their position during the next season. Their hopes however were dashed when an arson attack destroyed the changing rooms and without the required facilities the team had to fold.

=== Promotion to the Welsh Alliance ===
Football returned to St Asaph in 2000 when the junior football teams were formed to play in the Rhyl and District Junior League. The Council built a new Pavilion which was opened in 2006 and Senior football was re-established in 2006–07 season when the team joined the Clwyd League Division 2.. After finishing second in 2008-09 the team were promoted to Division 1. The following season 2009-10 the team won the League Championship and were promoted to the Premier League. Season 2012-13 saw the team become champions of the Premier League and win promotion to the Welsh Alliance League Division 2 finishing fourth in the League and sharing the Fair Play Trophy with Blaenau Amateurs.

Season 2014-15 saw the Saints crowned Champions of Division 2 as well as completing the double by winning the League Cup. From season 2015–16 to season 2019-20 they played in the Welsh Alliance Division 1, winning the Fair Play Trophy in season 2016–17.

=== Double Winners ===
A Reserves team was established in the Vale of Clwyd & Conwy League in 2017 before playing in the Welsh Alliance Reserves League in season 2019–20. The club also has a strong Junior Section with teams in the Rhyl & District Junior League.

The club played in the Inaugural Ardal North West season in 2021/22, finishing in 14th place which saw them relegated to the North Wales Coast East Premier Division. They won the league and returned to the Ardal North West after only one season away.

With the club on -2 points after six games (three points deducted) in the 2025–26 season, the club made four new signings, as well as a new coach, and Dan Sleet joining as manager from Meliden. St Asaph finished the season with 5 points, finishing bottom of the league and they were relegated.

== Current squad ==
As of 13 March 2025

Note: Flags indicate national team as defined under FIFA eligibility rules.

Note: Flags indicate national team as defined under FIFA eligibility rules; some limited exceptions apply. Players may hold more than one non-FIFA nationality.

No.	Pos.	Nation	Player
—	GK	WAL	Hughie Foulkes
—	GK	WAL	Luke Jones
—	GK	WAL	Oliver Wilkinson-Roberts
—	DF	WAL	David Hayes
—	DF	WAL	Harrison Roberts
—	DF	WAL	Nathan Jones
—	DF	WAL	Alex Hall
—	DF	WAL	Ellis Blench
—	DF	WAL	Sion Williams
—	DF	WAL	Ben Hesketh
—	DF	WAL	Callum Murphy
—	DF	WAL	Simon Fawcett
—	MF	WAL	Harry Owen
—	MF	WAL	Harri Williams

No.	Pos.	Nation	Player
—	MF	WAL	Elis McLoughlin
—	MF	WAL	Jack Nightingale
—	MF	WAL	Liam Grayson
—	MF	WAL	Ryan Potts
—	MF	WAL	Mark Price
—	MF	WAL	David Evans
—	MF	WAL	Callum Roberts
—	MF	WAL	Lloyd Hayes
—	MF	WAL	Jackson Brewerton
—	FW	WAL	Josh Roberts
—	FW	WAL	James Williams
—	FW	WAL	Jack Jones
—	FW	WAL	Kieran Garnett-Hughes
—	FW	WAL	Oli Williams
—	FW	WAL	Jake Walker

== Club staff ==
=== First team ===
- Manager: Dean Martin (caretaker)
- Assistant Manager: Glyn Roberts

=== Reserves ===
- Manager: Lee Williams

=== Backroom staff ===
- Chairman: Dean Martin
- Vice-chairman: John Roberts
- Secretary: Susan Jones
- Media Officer: Tony O'Reilly
- Media Officer Assistant: Harrison Wells O'Reilly

== Honours ==
- Welsh Alliance League Division Two – Champions: 2014–15
- Vale of Clwyd and Conwy Football League Premier Division – Champions: 2012–13
- Clwyd Football League Premier League - Champions: 1992–93
- Clwyd Football League Premier League Runners-up: 1990–91
- Clwyd Football League Division One Champions: 2009–10
- Clwyd Football League Division Two Runners-up: 2008–09
- Clwyd Football League Division Three – Runners-up: 1976–77, 1979–80 (reserves)
- North Wales Coast League Intermediate Challenge Cup Finalist: 2022–23
- Cookson Cup Finalist: 2022–23
- Take Stock Van Hire Cup Winners: 2014–15
- President's Cup Winners: 1990–91, 1991–92
- REM Jones Cup Winners: 1990–91, 2009–10
