= NFA F.C. =

Football club based in North Wales

NFA
- Full name: North Football Association Football Club
- Founded: 2018
- Ground: Ffordd Derwen
- League: Ardal NW League
- 2024–25: Ardal NW League, 7th of 16
Home colours	Away colours

North Football Association Football Club, usually abbreviated as NFA, is a Welsh football club based in Rhyl, Denbighshire. The club's men's team plays in the Ardal NW League, and the women's team plays in the North Wales Coast Women's Football League.

The club plays at Ffordd Derwen in Rhyl. Their home colours are blue shirts, grey shorts, and blue socks, and their away colours are lilac shirts with grey shorts and socks.

== History ==
The club was founded in 2018, and formed both men's and women's teams in 2019.

=== Men's team ===
In 2019 the club formed a men's team, joining the Vale of Clwyd and Conwy Football League, in its First Division. As the 2019–20 season was abandoned due to the COVID-19 pandemic, the league was decided by points per game, and NFA won the league title by 0.03 PPG ahead of Llysfaen.

For the following season the North Wales Coast FA leagues were restructured, with NFA placed into the fourth-tier North Wales Coast East Football League Premier Division. However the 2020–21 season was cancelled due to the COVID-19 pandemic, and when the 2021–22 season was played NFA were in Division One. They finished tenth in their first season in the new league.

In the 2022–23 season the team finished second in the league, gaining promotion to the Premier Division. The following season they were Premier Division champions, and promoted to the third-tier Ardal Leagues. In their first season in the third tier, the team finished seventh out of sixteen teams.

=== Women's team ===
In 2019 they had a team accepted into the North Wales Women's Football League. For the 2023–24 season they were promoted to the Adran North, after finishing fourth in the North Wales Women's League. In 2025 NFA were relegated, and replaced by Berriew in the second tier. NFA joined the newly-formed North Wales Coast Women's Football League.

== Honours ==
- North Wales Coast East Football League Premier Division – Champions: 2023–24
- Vale of Clwyd and Conwy Football League First Division – Champions: 2019–20
