= Broughton United A.F.C. =

Association football club in Wales

Broughton United
- Full name: Broughton United Football Club
- Nickname: Saints
- Founded: 2024; 2 years ago
- Ground: The Airfield
- League: Ardal NW League
- 2025–26: North East Wales Division One, 2nd of 12 (promoted)
Home colours	Away colours

Broughton United Football Club are a Welsh football club from Broughton, Flintshire, Wales. They play in the Ardal NW League.

== History ==
The club shares its name with Broughton United F.C. who appeared in The Combination, an early league in English football and in five Welsh Cup competitions where they reached the quarter-finals three times.

The current Broughton United side has its own origins in the junior football scene, going as far back as 1976, and comes from the merger of the village's junior sides, Broughton Super Saints and Broughton Park. The junior teams run the full age range from under 5's to 17 years old. The club's home ground is at Brookes Avenue in Broughton.

A senior side was created in 2024 for youth players who had progressed through the junior system who were looking to play senior football. The club's debut season was 2024–25 in the tier five North East Wales Football League Championship. This was a successful season for the club where they finished as league champions, gaining promotion tier four. They finished their debut season with an 8–0 win over Skippy, meaning they had won 25 of their 28 matches, scoring 172 goals.

For the 2025–26 season the club played their home games in the village of Northop Hall, at the Northop Hall Pavilion. They finished runners-up in the North East Wales Football League Premier Division and were promoted to the Ardal North West. For the 2026–27 season they are ground-sharing with Airbus UK Broughton at The Airfield.

The club's nickname owes its lineage to the Broughton Super Saints.

== Honours ==
- North East Wales Football League Championship – Winners: 2024–25
- North East Wales Football League Division One – Runners-up: 2025–26
