= Mumbles Rangers F.C. =

Association football club in Wales

Coordinates: 51°36′21.1″N 3°59′15.1″W

Mumbles Rangers Club
- Full name: Mumbles Rangers Football Club
- Founded: 1950
- Ground: Underhill Park
- Manager: Stephen Price
- League: Ardal SW League
- 2025–26: West Wales Premier League, 2nd of 16 (promoted)

Mumbles Rangers Football Club is an amateur Welsh football team based in Mumbles, Swansea, Wales. They play in the Ardal SW League.

== History ==
Formed in 1950 by Billy Johns, BEM, the team played in the Swansea Senior Football League until the 2020–21 season when the club joined the newly formed tier four West Wales Premier League. On 9 June 2022, it was announced that the club had been promoted to the tier three Ardal SW League for the 2022–23 season. They were relegated at the end of their second season at tier three.

== Honours ==
- West Wales Premier League
  - Runners-up: 2021–22 2025–26
