= Blaen-y-Maes AFC =

Association football club in Wales

Blaen-y-Maes
- Full name: Blaen-y-Maes Association Football Club
- Founded: 1973
- Ground: Cadle Mill football pitch
- League: Swansea Senior League Premier Division
- 2025–26: Swansea Senior League Premier Division, 4th of 11

Blaen-y-Maes Association Football Club is an amateur Welsh football team from the area of Blaen-y-Maes in Swansea. The club was formed in 1973. They play in a leased pitch called the Cadle Mill football pitch. Blaen-y-Maes AFC currently plays in the Premier Division of the Swansea Senior Football League.

The club has competed in the Welsh Cup. In the 2026–27 Welsh Cup they have qualified to the third round.

== Swansea City ==
Blaen-y-Maes has some relations to the much larger Swansea City, who play in the same city. Swansea City participated in the Premier League Kicks campaign, which gifts football equipment to young players in need. Blaen-y-Maes was one of the teams who got donations from Swansea City.
