= Cwm Welfare A.F.C. =

Association football club in Wales

Cwm Welfare Association Football Club
- Full name: Cwm Welfare Association Football Club
- Nickname: The Welfare
- Founded: 1949
- Stadium: Mount Pleasant Park
- Capacity: 1,000
- Chairman: Lesley Hanson
- League: South Wales Premier League Division One West
- 2025–26: South Wales Premier League Division One West, 3rd of 12
- Website: https://cwmwelfare.com/
Home colours	Away colours

Cwm Welfare A.F.C. are a Welsh football club from the village of Beddau which is approximately six miles from the county town of Pontypridd in the Rhondda Cynon Taf in Wales. Formed in 1949, they have played in the Welsh Football League. They play in the South Wales Premier League Division One West.

== History ==
The team was formed in 1949 entering the South Wales Amateur League. They were Division Two champions in the 1959–60 season. They club subsequently played in the Pontypridd and District League, before in 1998-99 joining the South Wales Senior League. They were Division Two champions in the 2003–04 season. A number of seasons in Division One saw them finish runners-up in the 2009–10 and 2012–13 seasons. The 2013–14 season saw them go one better and finish as Division One champions. They then won the play off final, beating Trefelin gaining promotion to the Welsh Football League. Three seasons in the league saw two mid-table finished in the Welsh Football League Division Three before they finished bottom of the league in the 2016–17 season and were relegated. The then joined the South Wales Alliance League Premier Division finishing bottom in 2017–18 but were spared relegation. In the 2018–19 season they regularly suffered sizeable defeats, including losing 12–1, 16–0 and 17–0 in December 2018 and January 2019. The club finished bottom of the league again at the end of the season and were relegated to Division One for the 2019–20 season.

== Honours ==
- South Wales Senior League Division One
  - Champions: 1984–85; 1985–86; 1986–87; 1987–88; 1994–95; 1997–98; 2013–14
  - Runners-Up: 1993–94; 1994–95; 2009–10; 2012–13
- South Wales Senior League Division Two
  - Champions: 2003–04
- South Wales Amateur League Division Two
  - Champions: 1959–60
- Greyhound Cup
  - Winners: 1983–84; 1987–88; 1994–95
- Horniman Cup
  - Winners 1988–89; 1994-95
  - Runners-up: 1968–69
- Senior Amateur Cup
  - Winners: 1983–84; 1985–86; 1986–87; 1987–88; 1994–95; 1997–98
- SWFA Intermediate Cup
  - Winners: 1959–60
- Gwent Premier League County Motors Cup
  - Winners: 1997–98

== Welsh Football League history ==
Information in this section is sourced from the Football Club History Database.

Season	League	Final position
2014–15	Welsh Football League Division Three	10th
2015–16	Welsh Football League Division Three	8th
2016–17	Welsh Football League Division Three	16th (relegated)
