= Ardal Leagues =

Association football league in Wales

- Founded: 2020
- Country: Wales
- Divisions: 2
- Number of clubs: 63
- Level on pyramid: 3
- Promotion to: Cymru North; Cymru South
- Relegation to: Central Wales Football League; North East Wales Premier; North Wales Coast East Premier; North Wales Coast West Premier; Gwent Premier; South Wales Premier; West Wales Premier
- Domestic cup(s): Ardal North Cup; Ardal South Cup
- Current champions: Llanuwchllyn (NE); Bangor City 1876 (NW); Caldicot Town (SE); Pure Swansea (SW)
- Current: 2026–27 Ardal Leagues

The Ardal Leagues are a football league in Wales. The word ardal translates as "district" in English, with Wales split into four regions at this level. They have clubs with amateur/semi-professional status and sit at the third level of the Welsh football league system. The first year of their operation would have been 2020–21 but the 2020–21 Ardal North East season, 2020–21 Ardal North West season, 2020–21 Ardal South East season and 2020–21 Ardal South West season were all cancelled. The inaugural season was moved to 2021–22. The creation of the leagues mark the first time the Football Association of Wales owns and is administering tier 3 of the Welsh league system. These changes follow from a review of the Welsh football pyramid. To be eligible clubs need to meet the criteria for FAW tier 3 certification.

The league is split into two leagues, covering North and South Wales. Both Northern and Southern leagues have two regionally-based sections of sixteen clubs each:

- Ardal Northern
  - Ardal North East (2026–27 Ardal NE season)
  - Ardal North West (2026–27 Ardal NW season)
- Ardal Southern
  - Ardal South East (2026–27 Ardal SE season)
  - Ardal South West (2026–27 Ardal SW season)

The winners of each league are promoted to either the Cymru North or the Cymru South as long as they meet the FAW's tier 2 certification criteria. Subject to also meeting these criteria, the four runners-up clubs enter play-off matches with two of the clubs also gaining promotion (one from the north and one from the south).

The Ardal Leagues structure replaced the former tier 3 leagues: Welsh Football League Division One, Mid Wales Football League Division One, Welsh Alliance League Division One and the Welsh National League Premier Division, leagues based in South Wales, Mid Wales, North West Wales and North East Wales respectively.

Relegation from the Ardal Leagues is to six local tier 4 leagues, with three clubs relegated from each of the tier 3 leagues at the end of the season. The tier 4 leagues are run by each of the Area Associations of Welsh football, the West Wales Football Association, the South Wales Football Association, the Gwent County Football Association, the Central Wales Football Association, the North East Wales Football Association and the North Wales Coast Football Association.

== Ardal League teams ==
On 10 July 2020 the FAW confirmed the 64 teams in the new tier 3 leagues. In an attempt to avoid dividing the current Mid-Wales teams across all four leagues, the North-East league contains a large contingent of the Mid-Wales teams. The North-West league contains the sides near the North Wales coast. After confirmation of their inclusion STM Sports announced on 27 July that they had folded, leaving only 15 sides in the South West league. On 3 August it was confirmed that Cardiff Draconians had been promoted from the South Wales Alliance League to fill the remaining place in the league.

Since COVID-19-originated restrictions were put in place by the FAW, as from 10 August, clubs could have trained in groups of 15 and contact training would have been allowed at all-levels of football. However, competitive and exhibition matches were still not allowed to take place. Consequently, the FAW decided to cancel what was to be the Ardal Leagues' inaugural 2020–21 season on 4 February 2021, and on 26 March, Montgomery Town withdrew from the North East league for pandemic-related reasons. They were replaced by Cardiff Draconians, as the highest placed team from the Alliance League who had been awarded a licence.

=== 2026–27 season ===
The following clubs are league members for the 2026–27 season.

==== Ardal NE ====
- Bow Street
- Builth Wells
- Carno
- Cefn Albion
- Corwen
- Dolgellau Athletic
- FC Queens Park
- Kerry
- Knighton Town
- Llandrindod Wells (withdrew)
- Llanfair United
- Llangollen Town
- Llanrhaeadr
- Penycae
- Radnor Valley
- Rhos Aelwyd

==== Ardal NW ====
- Bethesda Athletic
- Broughton United
- Connah's Quay Town
- Kinmel Bay
- Llangefni Town
- Llannefydd
- Llanrwst United
- Llay Welfare
- Mynydd Isa
- Nefyn United
- NFA
- Penmaenmawr Phoenix
- Prestatyn Town
- Pwllheli
- Trearddur Bay
- Y Felinheli

==== Ardal SE ====
- Abercarn United
- Abergavenny Town
- Blaenavon Blues
- Brecon Corries
- Caldicot Town
- Chepstow Town
- Croesyceiliog
- Cwmbran Celtic
- Cwmbran Town
- Goytre
- Lliswerry
- New Inn
- Newport Corinthians
- Risca United
- Tredegar Town
- Undy Athletic

==== Ardal SW ====
- AFC Llwydcoed
- Canton
- Cardiff Airport
- Cardiff Corinthians
- Cefn Cribwr
- Clydach
- Evans & Williams
- Goytre United
- Morriston Town
- Mumbles Rangers
- Penrhiwceiber Rangers
- Penydarren
- Port Talbot Town
- Seven Sisters Onllwyn
- Taffs Well
- Ynysygerwn

==== Map ====
Locations of teams in the 2024–25 season of Ardal leagues

== League champions, runner-ups, relegated teams, and Fair Play winners ==
=== Ardal NE ===
Season	Champions	Runner-up	Relegated teams	Fair Play winners
2021–22	Chirk AAA	Caersws	Carno, Kerry, Four Crosses	Berriew
2022–23	Caersws	Cefn Albion	Corwen, Rhayader Town	Caersws
2023–24	Penrhyncoch	Bow Street	Llanrhaeadr, Welshpool Town	Penrhyncoch
2024–25	Brickfield Rangers	Bow Street	Llanidloes Town, Chirk AAA, Llansantffraid Village	TBC
2025–26	Llanuwchllyn	Knighton Town	Lex XI	

=== Ardal NW ===
Season	Champions	Runner-up	Relegated teams	Fair Play winners
2021–22	Mold Alexandra	Porthmadog	St Asaph City, Brymbo, Blaenau Amateurs	Porthmadog
2022–23	Denbigh Town	Bangor 1876	Rhostyllen	Denbigh Town
2023–24	Flint Mountain	Llay Welfare	Bethesda Athletic, Hawarden Rangers, Saltney Town	Y Felinheli
2024–25	Rhyl 1879	Holyhead Hotspur	Nantlle Vale, Menai Bridge Tigers, Conwy Borough	TBC
2025–26	Bangor City 1876	Porthmadog	St Asaph City	

=== Ardal SE ===
Season	Champions	Runner-up	Relegated teams	Fair Play winners
2021–22	Abergavenny Town	Abertillery Bluebirds	Panteg, Abertillery Excelsiors, Aberbargoed Buds	Chepstow Town
2022–23	Abertillery Bluebirds	Risca United	Croesyceiliog, Monmouth Town, RTB Ebbw Vale	Newport City
2023–24	Trethomas Bluebirds	Newport City	Aberbargoed Buds, Hay St Marys, Lliswerry	Abercarn United
2024–25	Treowen Stars	Chepstow Town	Treharris Athletic Western, Newport Corinthians	TBC
2025–26	Caerphilly Athletic	Cwmbran Town	Abertillery Bluebirds	

=== Ardal SW ===
Season	Champions	Runner-up	Relegated teams	Fair Play winners
2021–22	Pontardawe Town	Ynyshir Albions	Ton Pentre, West End, AFC Porth	Penrhiwceiber Rangers
2022–23	Caerau (Ely)	Baglan Dragons	Garden Village, Cwmamman United, Dinas Powys	Caerau (Ely)
2023–24	Penrhiwceiber Rangers	Cefn Cribwr	Mumbles Rangers, Penydarren BGC, Port Talbot Town	Swansea University
2024–25	Cardiff Draconians	Ynyshir Albions	Bridgend Street, Pontyclun	TBC
2025–26	Pure Swansea	Pontardawe Town	Treherbert, South Gower	

=== Promotion play-offs ===
==== Ardal Northern ====
Season	Ardal NE play-off finalist	Score	Ardal NW play-off finalist
2021–22	Caersws	0–5	Porthmadog
2022–23	Cefn Albion	2–4 (a.e.t.)	Bangor 1876
2023–24	Llanuwchllyn	0–0 (a.e.t.) (5–6 p)	Llay Welfare
2024–25	Llanuwchllyn	0–3	Holyhead Hotspur
2025–26	Knighton Town	0–3	Porthmadog

==== Ardal Southern ====
Season	Ardal SE play-off finalist	Score	Ardal SW play-off finalist
2021–22	Abertillery Bluebirds	0–3	Ynyshir Albions
2022–23	Risca United	0–2	Baglan Dragons
2023–24	Newport City	2–1	Cefn Cribwr
2024–25	Chepstow Town	0–2	Ynyshir Albions
2025–26	Cwmbrân Town	0–2	Pontardawe Town

== See also ==
- List of association football competitions
- Mid Wales Football League
- Welsh Alliance League
- Welsh Football League
- Welsh National League (Wrexham Area)
