= Afan United F.C. =

Association football club in Wales

Afan United
- Full name: Afan United Football Club
- Nickname: The Afan
- Founded: 2020
- Ground: Marstons Stadium
- Chairman: Remi Whitelock
- Manager: Vincent Lewis
- League: South Wales Premier League Premier Division
- 2025–26: South Wales Premier League Premier Division, 6th of 13
Home colours	Away colours

Afan United Football Club are a Welsh football club from Port Talbot in Neath Port Talbot, Wales. They play in the South Wales Premier League Championship Division, which is at the fifth tier of the Welsh football pyramid.

== History ==
The club was established in early 2020. The club gained four successive promotions as champions in the first four playing seasons, rising from Division One in the Port Talbot League to the top tier of the South Wales Premier League for the 2025–26 season.

They also have rivalries with Margam and Tata Steel United.

In May 2025 the club were awarded £300,000 by the Welsh Government towards upgrading their existing 3G pitch, LED floodlighting, fencing and for creating a new community hub.

== Honours ==
- South Wales Premier League Championship Division – Champions: 2024–25
- South Wales Premier League Division One West – Champions: 2023–24
- South Wales Premier League John Owen Cup – Winners: 2025–26
- Port Talbot Football League Premier League – Champions: 2022–23
- Port Talbot Football League Division One – Champions: 2021–22
- Port Talbot Football League League Cup – Winners: 2021–22
- Port Talbot Football League First Division Challenge Cup – Winners: 2021–22
