= C.P.D. Y Glannau =

Football club based in Denbighshire

Y Glannau
- Full name: Clwb Pel Droed Y Glannau
- Founded: 1994
- Ground: Ysgol Glan Clwyd
- League: North Wales Coast East Premier Division
- 2025–26: North Wales Coast East Premier Division, 6th of 12
- Website: cpdyglannau.cymru

C.P.D. Y Glannau is a Welsh football club based in St Asaph, Denbighshire. The team currently plays in the North Wales Coast East Premier Division.

The club was founded in 1994, aiming to promote the Welsh language and culture.

The club has competed in the Welsh Cup multiple times, including reaching the first round in 2026–27 where they were drew to play Buckley Town and lost 9–0.

== Honours ==
- NWCFA Development League - Champions: 2023–24 (second team)
