= Clydach F.C. =

Association football club in Wales

Clydach
- Full name: Clydach Football Club
- Founded: 2021
- Ground: Parc Coed Gwilym
- League: Ardal SW League
- 2024–25: Ardal SW League, 12th of 16
Home colours	Away colours

Clydach Football Club (Welsh: Clwb Pêl-Droed Clydach) is a Welsh football team based in Clydach, a village and community near Swansea, Wales. They play in the Ardal SW League.

== History ==
The club was established in 2021 through the merger of two long-standing Clydach clubs, FC Clydach and Clydach Cricket Football Club.

For the 2021–22 season the club joined the tier four West Wales Premier League having been promoted as runners-up of the Neath Premier Division. In their first season in the league they finished 6th out of 11 teams.

In 2024 it was confirmed that the club were promoted to the third-tier Ardal South West League. This followed a 4th-place finish in the West Wales Premier League. In the same year they also unveiled new changing room facilities for their women's and girls teams.

== Honours ==
- Neath & District League Premier Division – Runners-up: 2021–22
- Neath & District League Premier Division Cup – Winners: 2021–22
- Reserve Open Cup – Winners: 2021–22 (reserves)
