= New Inn A.F.C. =

Association football club in Wales

- Full name: New Inn Football Club
- Founded: 1936
- Ground: Woodfield Road
- Chairman: Anthony Williams
- Coach: Gareth Williams
- League: Ardal SE League
- 2025–26: Gwent County League Premier Division, 2nd of 16 (promoted)

New Inn Football Club are a Welsh football club from New Inn, a village south east of Pontypool, Wales. They play in the Ardal SE League, the third tier of the Welsh football pyramid.

== History ==
After finishing runners–up in the Gwent County League Premier Division in the 2025–26 season, and gaining a tier three licence, the club were promoted to the third tier for the first time in the 2026–27 season.

The club's development team plays in the Gwent Central League.

== Honours ==
- Gwent County League Premier Division – Runners-up: 2025–26
- Gwent County League Division One – Champions: 2021–22
- Gwent County League Division Three – Runners-up: 2012–13
- Gwent County FA Senior Cup – Runners–up: 2025–26
- Gwent Central League First Division – Champions: 2025–26 (development team)
- Gwent Central League Langdon Cup – Winners: 2025–26 (development team)
- Gwent Central League Benevolent Cup – Winners: 1990–91
