= Meliden F.C. =

Association football club in Wales

Meliden
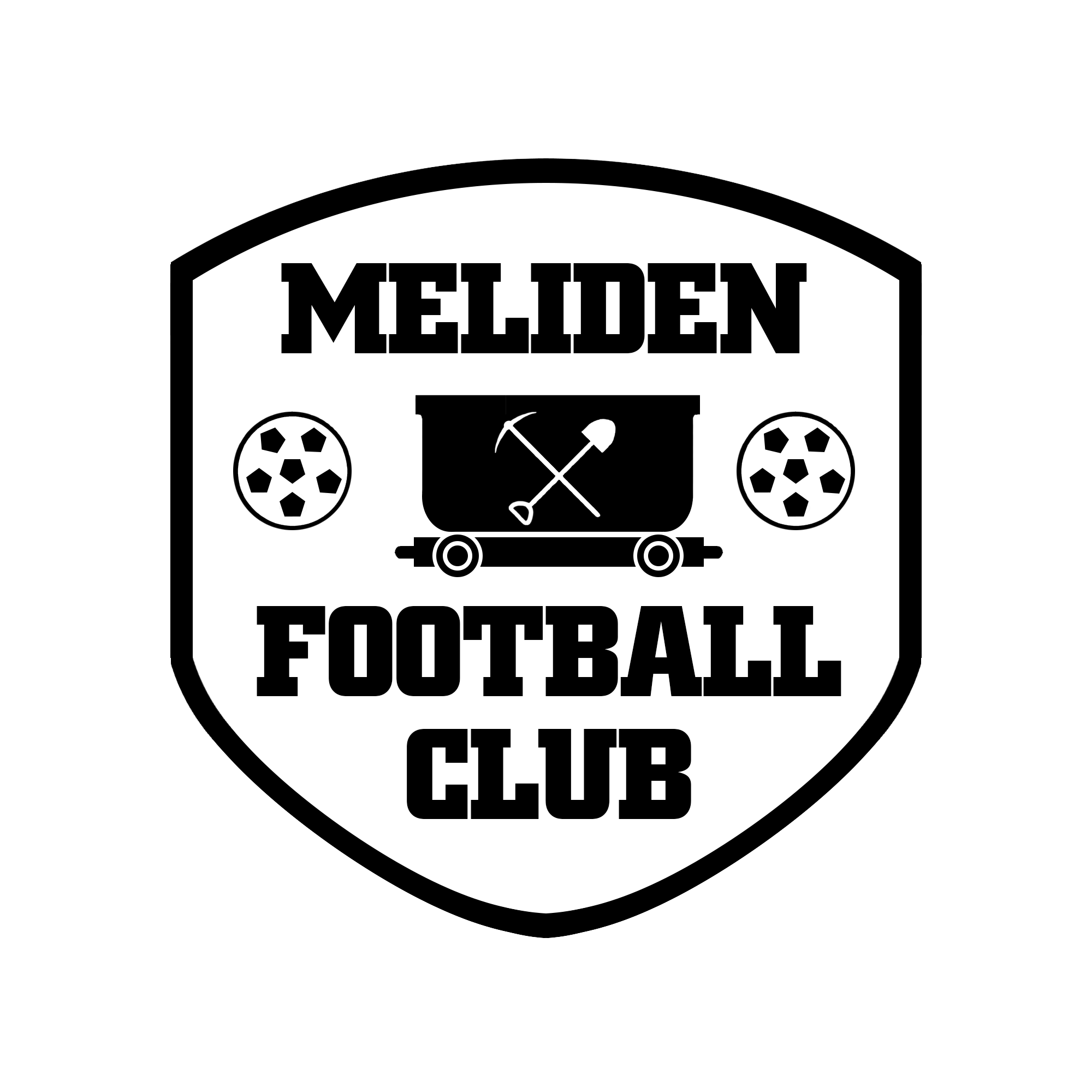
- Full name: Meliden Football Club
- Nickname: The Miners
- Founded: 1974 (reformed 2008)
- Ground: The Mine
- Chairman: Tom Fletcher
- Manager: Richard Hillier-Evans; James Sweetman; Scott Stewart
- League: North Wales Coast East Division One
- 2024–25: North Wales Coast East Premier Division, (withdrew from league)
- Website: https://www.melidenfootballclub.co.uk

Meliden Football Club is a Welsh football team based in Meliden, Denbighshire, Wales. The team played in the North Wales Coast East Football League Premier Division, until they withdrew from the league in September 2025.

== History ==
Meliden Football Club was originally founded in 1974. They played in the Clwyd Football League, and gained promotion to the Premier Division in 1994–95, but folded in 1997.

The club reformed for the 2008–09 season and initially joined the Clwyd League. In 2012 they won the Clwyd Cup and Combination Cup, and joined the Welsh Alliance League in 2012. They played seven seasons in Division Two, with their best finishing position being fifth in the first season.

In March 2019 the club announced that at the end of the 2018–19 season they would resign from the Welsh Alliance League and rejoin the Vale of Clwyd and Conwy Football League. They finished the 2019–20 season in sixth place in a season curtailed by the COVID-19 pandemic.

In 2020 the team was accepted into the Premier Division of the new North Wales Coast East Football League.

In 2023 Meliden reached two cup semi-finals, in the Cookson Cup and NWCFA Intermediate Challenge Cup, but lost both.

In October 2024 after a string of losses, Warren Adam mutually left Meliden, with Dan Sleet taking over as Manager with the return of player Luke Astley as Assistant Player/Manager.

In September 2025, the club withdrew from the North Wales Coast East League.

In June 2026, following a sabbatical for the club that lasted over 6 months, the club returned to full operations. In the 2026–27 Welsh Cup they reached the first round for the first time in the club's history but lost 11–0 to third-tier Y Felinheli at Bangor City Stadium.

== Honours ==
- Clwyd Football League Premier Division – Runners-up: 2011–12
- Clwyd Football League Division One - Runners-up: 2009–10
- Clwyd Cup – Winners: 2011–12
- Combination Cup – Winners: 2011–12
