= Llannefydd F.C. =

Association football club in Wales

Coordinates: 53°13′28″N 3°31′54″W

CPD Llannefydd FC
- Founded: 1999
- Ground: Cae Llannefydd
- Manager: Chris Morrell
- League: Ardal NW League
- 2025–26: Ardal NW League, 3rd of 16
Home colours	Away colours

CPD Llannefydd FC (Welsh: Clwb Pêl Droed Llannefydd) is a Welsh football team based in Llannefydd, Conwy County Borough. The team play in the Ardal NW League.

== History ==
In August 1999, a new playing field was unveiled in Llannefydd, after seven years of work. This was to host the newly formed football club. Llannefydd joined the Clwyd League Division Two. Their first four matches were two draws and two losses, but their first win came in September, 7–2 against Hawarden Rangers Juniors.

In 2011, the club joined the newly formed Vale of Clwyd and Conwy Football League, and were placed in Division One. They were runners-up in their first season.

Llannefydd finished 3rd in 2012–13 and won their first trophy that season, beating Bro Cernyw 3–1 in the final of the Auxiliary Cup. The next season, they progressed to the Premier Division. Llannefydd won the league title and retained the Auxiliary Cup with a 2–0 win over Machno United.

In 2015 they again reached the Auxiliary Cup final, but lost to Rhyl Athletic. In the following season, they were runners-up in the league and won the President's Cup.

The club's most notable season was 2016–17, when they won the Premier Division title, Premier Cup and Premier Auxiliary Cup and just missed out on a quadruple when losing in the President's Cup final to Abergele. They were promoted to the Welsh Alliance League Division Two where their best finish was as runner-up at the end of the 2019–20 season.

The club then joined the North Wales Coast East Football League Premier Division (tier 4) as part of the restructure of the Welsh football pyramid. After two consecutive second-place finishes, the club was promoted to the Ardal North West in 2023.

== Honours ==
- Welsh Alliance League Division Two – Runners-up: 2019–20
- North Wales Coast East Football League Premier Division – Runners-up: 2021–22, 2022–23
- Vale of Clwyd and Conwy Football League Premier Division – Champions: 2013–14, 2016–17
- Vale of Clwyd and Conwy Football League Premier Division – Runners-up: 2015–16
- Vale of Clwyd and Conwy Football League Division One – Runners-up: 2011–12
- Premier Auxiliary Cup – Winners: 2012–13, 2013–14, 2016–17
- Premier Auxiliary Cup – Runners-up: 2014–15
- Normal Precision Premier Cup – Winners: 2016–17
- President's Cup – Winners: 2015–16
- President's Cup – Runners-up: 2016–17
