= CK Swiss Valley A.F.C. =

Association football club in Wales

CK Swiss Valley
- Full name: Calsonic Kansei Swiss Valley Association Football Club
- Founded: 2011
- Ground: Calsonic Sports & Social Club
- League: West Wales Premier League
- 2025–26: West Wales Premier League, 5th of 16
Home colours

Calsonic Kansei Swiss Valley Association Football Club, commonly abbreviated to CKSV, is a Welsh football team based near Llanelli, Wales. They play in the West Wales Premier League.

== History ==
The club was founded in 2011 as a merger of Calsonic and Swiss Valley, two sides playing in the Carmarthenshire League. The new club played in Division Three, taking the place of Swiss Valley (whereas Calsonic had been in Division One), and they won the league in their first season. In 2016–17 they won Division Two.

By 2020 they had reached the Carmarthenshire League Premier Division. For the 2020–21 season the club joined the newly formed tier four West Wales Premier League.

== Honours ==
- Carmarthenshire League Division Two – Champions: 2016–17
- Carmarthenshire League Division Three – Champions: 2011–12
