= Bro Cernyw F.C. =

Association football club in Wales

Bro Cernyw
- Full name: CPD Bro Cernyw
- Founded: 1990
- Ground: Bro Cernyw Primary School
- League: North Wales Coast East Premier Division
- 2024–25: North Wales Coast East Premier Division, 12th of 15

Bro Cernyw Football Club (Welsh: Clwb Pêl Droed Bro Cernyw) is a Welsh football team based in Llangernyw, a Welsh-speaking village and community in Conwy County Borough, Wales. The team play in the North Wales Coast East Premier Division.

Euryn Williams helped to form Bro Cernyw in 1990 and played for them until 2006, scoring 683 goals. This is believed to have been a North Wales record until it was broken by Asa Thomas (who played for various clubs on Anglesey) in 2024.

== Honours ==
- Vale of Conwy Football League
  - Champions: 1993–94, 2000–01
  - Runners-up: 1991–92, 1992–93
