= C.P.D. Gronant =

Football club based in Gronant, Flintshire

Gronant
- Full name: Clwb Pel Droed Gronant
- Founded: 2018 as Llanelwy Athletic; 2022 as Gronant
- Ground: Gronant Playing Fields
- League: North East Wales Division Three
- 2024–25: North East Wales Football League Premier Division 12th of 12

C.P.D. Gronant is a Welsh football club based in Gronant, Flintshire. The team currently plays in the North East Wales Division Three.

The club was founded in 2018 as Llanelwy Athletic. Despite using the name Llanelwy (Welsh for St Asaph), they played their home games at Gronant. Their first season was described as "memorable" by local news, with the team crowned champions of the Vale of Clwyd and Conwy League Division One in early February, and going on to finish the season unbeaten. The 2019–20 season was shortened due to the COVID-19 pandemic, and the team finished second-bottom of the Premier Division. In 2020 they became inaugural members of the North Wales Coast East Football League Division One. The new league's first season was cancelled due to the pandemic, and when it was first played in 2021–22 they finished 4th out of 14 teams. They also reached the first round of the Welsh Cup that season, where they lost to Berriew.

In June 2022, the club renamed to C.P.D. Gronant. Due to a dispute over the right to use the name Gronant, they were forced to move from the North Wales Coast East Football League to the North East Wales Football League.

The club announced they would leave the North East Wales Football League after the 2024–25 season.

The club rejoined the North Wales Coast East League for the 2025–26 season, as Dunes FC, but withdrew during pre-season. In August of the same year, the club was accepted as a late entrant into the North East Wales League.

== Honours ==
- Vale of Clwyd and Conwy Football League Division One - Champions: 2018–19
- North East Wales Football League Championship Division – Runners–up: 2023–24
- Two Counties Cup - Winners: 2022–23
