= Chepstow Town F.C. =

Association football club in Wales

Coordinates: 51°38′7.5″N 2°40′55.2″W

Chepstow Town
- Full name: Chepstow Town Football Club
- Nickname: The Jockeys
- Founded: 1878
- Ground: Larkfield Park
- Chairman: Robert Moore
- Manager: Marc Ingles
- League: Ardal SE League
- 2025–26: Ardal SE League, 7th of 16
Home colours	Away colours

Chepstow Town Football Club are a Welsh football club based in Chepstow, South East Wales and founded in 1878. The team play in the Ardal SE League.

== History ==
The club was founded in 1878 as Chepstow Castle. Prior to World War I they played in the East Gwent League. Chepstow joined the Welsh Football League for the first time when football resumed in 1919–20.

In 1928 Chepstow joined the Gloucestershire Northern Senior League and they won the league title in 1931–32. In 1935 Chepstow Town withdrew from the league and rejoined the Monmouthshire Senior League after ten years away.

After World War II the club was reformed by local servicemen, absorbing Chepstow Boys Club and Fairfield FC. They rejoined the Monmouthshire County League and were promoted to the Welsh League in 1954. In the 1964–65 season they were champions of Division Two, however travel costs and financial problems meant the club had to drop out of the league in 1970.

Chepstow then entered the newly formed Gwent Premier League, in Division Three. They progressed to the Gwent County League where they won Division Three in 1984–85, Division Two in 1991–92, and Division One in 1996–97 which meant they were promoted back to the Welsh League.

In their first season back in the Welsh League, Chepstow finished as runners-up to Milford United in Division Three and were promoted. After three seasons they were relegated back to Division Three and they were relegated to the Gwent County League in 2006–07. In 2011–12 they won the Gwent County League again to confirm a return to the Welsh League, and in the following season they finished third in Division Three, gaining another promotion. They missed out on a third successive promotion by two points and were relegated in 2016. They remained in Division Three until reorganisation in 2020 placed them in the Ardal South East.

In 2024–25 they were runners-up in the Ardal South League Cup and in the Ardal South East. This meant they would play Ardal South West runners-up Ynyshir Albions in a playoff for promotion to the Cymru South. Chepstow lost 2–0 and were not promoted.

== Honours ==
- Ardal SE Runners-up: 2024–25
- Ardal Southern Cup Finalists: 2024–25
- Welsh Football League Division Two Champions: 1964–65
- Gwent County League Division One Champions: 1996–97, 2011–12
- Gwent County League Division Two Champions: 1991–92
- Gwent County League Division Three Champions: 1984–85
- Gloucestershire Northern Senior League Champions: 1931–32
- East Gwent League Division Two - Champions: 2025–26 (third team)
