= Pontarddulais Town A.F.C. =

Association football club in Wales

Pontarddulais Town
- Full name: Pontarddulais Town Association Football Club
- Nickname(s): Bont
- Founded: 1970
- Ground: Coed Bach Park
- Chairman: Gary Mahoney
- Manager: Craig Gore
- League: West Wales Premier League
- 2023–24: West Wales Premier League, 14th of 15

Pontarddulais Town Association Football Club is a Welsh football based in Pontarddulais, Swansea, Wales They play in the West Wales Premier League.

== History ==
The club was formed in 1970, although there have also been previous sides including Pontarddulais Athletic.

For the 2020–21 season the club joined the newly formed tier 4 West Wales Premier League having previously played in the Carmarthenshire League Premier Division.
