= Geoff Thomas (footballer, born 1948) =

Welsh footballer

Personal information
- Date of birth: 18 February 1948
- Place of birth: Swansea, Wales
- Date of death: 13 January 2013 (aged 64)
- Position: Midfielder

Senior career*
Years	Team	Apps	(Gls)
1965–1976	Swansea City	357	(52)
1973	→ Manchester United (loan)		
1976–	Milford United		
- * Club domestic league appearances and goals

Geoff Thomas (18 February 1948 – 13 January 2013) was a Welsh professional footballer who played for Swansea City, making 357 appearances in the Football League. He died on 13 January 2013.

In addition to his career with Swansea, he spent time a month on loan at Manchester United in December 1973. After leaving Swansea in July 1976 he joined Milford United before playing local football in Swansea with North End in the Swansea Senior League.

He was capped by Wales at youth and under-23 level.
