= Clarbeston Road A.F.C. =

Football club based in Pembrokeshire, Wales

- Nicknames: Clarby, The Road
- Founded: 1962
- Ground: Graham Roberts Playing Field, Wiston Road
- League: Pembrokeshire League Division One
- 2024–25: Pembrokeshire League Division One, 6th of 12
- Website: http://www.clarbestonroadafc.co.uk/
Home colours	Away colours

Clarbeston Road A.F.C. is a Welsh football club based in Clarbeston Road, Pembrokeshire. The men's first team currently plays in the Pembrokeshire League Division One. The club also includes a reserve team, a women's team, a number of junior teams, and the Clarby Warriors disability team.

== History ==
Clarbeston Road A.F.C. was founded in 1962.

In 1962–63 and 2007–08 Clarbeston Road won the Pembrokeshire League's Margaret Davies sportsmanship cup. In 2008 the club also received an award at the Welsh Football Trust's awards ceremony.

In November 2023 Clarbeston Road became the first football club in Pembrokeshire to gain the Disability Sport Wales (DSW) insport Club award, recognising their commitment to inclusivity. This was for their Clarby Warriors disability team, formed after an amalgamation of the club with Cleddau Warriors.

At the end of the 2023–24 season, Clarbeston Road beat Goodwick United in the final of the Pembrokeshire Senior Cup.

In July 2024 Sport Wales reported on the club's successes in promoting biodiversity in the local area.

In September 2025 it was approved for the club to extend car parking and create a mini football pitch at their ground on Wiston Road.

== Ground ==
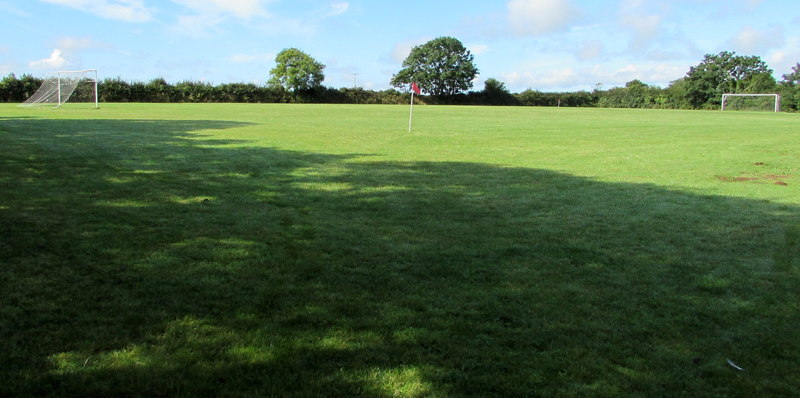
Clarbeston Road's home ground, pictured in 2015

In 2019 one of Clarbeston Road's pitches was renamed in memory of the landowner, Graham Roberts.
