= Rockspur Fords F.C. =

Football club based in Swansea

Rockspur Fords
- Full name: Rockspur Fords Football Club
- Founded: 2019
- League: West Wales Premier League
- 2025–26: West Wales Premier League, 1st of 16
Home colours	Away colours

Rockspur Fords F.C. is a Welsh football club based in Swansea. The team currently plays in the West Wales Premier League. Formed in 2019 as a merger of two Swansea Senior League teams (Rockspur and Kilvey Fords), the club has won several titles in the Swansea Senior League and West Wales Premier League.

== History ==
=== Rockspur Fords ===
The current club was founded in 2019 as a merger of Rockspur and Kilvey Fords. In the club's first season in its current form, they won the Swansea Senior League Division 1. In the 2021–22 season, the club won 4 competitions. The Swansea Senior League Division 1, Swansea Senior Cup, Swansea Open Cup, and the Swansea Charity Shield. In the following season, the club won the Swansea Senior League Division 1 for the third season in a row and the Swansea Senior Cup for the second season in a row. The club earned promotion to the West Wales Premier League. During this same season, the club took part in the 2022–23 Welsh Cup and made it to the first round, losing 1–0 to Chepstow Town.

In the club's first season in the West Wales Premier League, they finished as champions. The club also won the West Wales League Cup and made it to the second round of the 2023–24 Welsh Cup, losing on penalties to South Gower. The club went on to win the West Wales Premier League and the West Wales League Cup for a second time in the following season. In the 2025–26 season they became league champions for a third time in a row.

=== Rockspur ===
Rockspur was founded in 1933. From 2013 to 2015 they won back to back titles in the Swansea Senior League, rising from Division Three to Division One.

=== Kilvey Fords ===
Kilvey United was originally founded in 1940 but folded due to World War II. They reformed in the 1960s. In 2011 they were promoted to the Swansea Senior League Division One and finished runners-up in their first season. In 2013 the club, now known as Kilvey Fords, reached the final of the FAW Trophy, but lost 6–0 to Caernarfon Town in what was the biggest ever loss in an FAW Trophy final.

== Honours ==
=== Rockspur Fords ===
- West Wales Premier League – Champions (3): 2023–24, 2024–25, 2025–26
- Swansea Senior League Division One – Champions (3): 2019–20, 2021–22, 2022–23
- West Wales Premier League Cup – Winners (3): 2023–24, 2024–25, 2025–26
- Swansea Senior Cup – Winners (2): 2021–22, 2022–23
- Swansea Open Cup – Winners (1): 2021–22
- Swansea Charity Shield – Winners (1): 2021–22

=== Rockspur ===
- Swansea Senior League Division Two – Champions: 2014–15
- Swansea Senior League Division Three – Champions: 2013–14

=== Kilvey Fords/Kilvey United ===
- Swansea Senior League Division One – Champions: 2012–13
- Swansea Senior League Division One – Runners-up: 2011–12
- Swansea Senior League Division Two – Champions: 2010–11
- FAW Trophy – Runners-up: 2012–13
