= West Wales FA Senior Cup =

The West Wales FA Senior Cup was the regional knock-out competition for the higher ranked clubs beneath the umbrella of the West Wales Football Association until its end in 2009. It has been replaced with the WWFA Intermediate Cup, a tournament for clubs below Tier 3 in the Welsh football pyramid that play in West Wales.

The cup was open to clubs competing in the Welsh Football League, the League of Wales / Welsh Premier League following its formation in 1992, and also Swansea City. In later years the Senior Cup winners of the county leagues – Carmarthenshire, Neath & District, Pembrokeshire and Swansea – would be invited to take part.

Teams from outside the west Wales region – Barry, Bridgend Town, Merthyr Tydfil and Newport County – also reached early finals. The West Wales FA was affiliated to the South Wales FA until 1968, which allowed clubs from the latter association entrance to this competition.

Swansea City are by far the most successful team in the competition – winning the trophy 25 times in 38 finals, including one sharing of the competition with Llanelli in 1963 – but during the later years they would predominantly field a weakened team composed of reserve and youth players. They last competed in the 2005–06 competition.

== The last Senior Cup final – Reds take the plaudits ==
Llanelli were the last side to clinch the Senior Cup with a comprehensive 5–2 victory over West End in 2009.

An upset was on the cards as Welsh League outfit West End raced into a 2–0 first-half lead, only for Jordan Follows to pull one back for the Reds on the stroke of half-time.

But in the second-half the floodgates opened. Stephen Crabbe's red card didn't help West End's cause and strikes from Stuart Jones, Mark Pritchard (2) and captain Rhys Griffiths ensured that the trophy would return to Stebonheath Park for the tenth and final time.

== Competition Winners ==
Season	Winners	Score	Runners-up	Scorers	Date	Other Info
1923–24	Swansea Town		Pembroke Dock			
1924–25	Swansea Town	6-1	Llanelly		Saturday January 17, 1925	
1925–26	Swansea Town		Merthyr Town			
1926–27	Swansea Town		Bridgend Town			
1927–28	Barry AFC		Swansea Town			
1928–29	Newport County		Merthyr Town			
1929–30	Swansea Town		Newport County			
1930–31	Llanelly	5-3	Merthyr Town	Llanelly: Samuel, B Jones, Taylor 2, T Williams; Merthyr: Bayliss, Thomas, Atkins	Monday April 27, 1931	Replay after original tie ended 0-0 at Merthyr on 18/04/31
1931–32	Merthyr Town	3-2	Llanelly	Merthyr: Lowry, Alden Baggott; Llanelly: Cochrane, McIlwaine	Monday November 14, 1932	The game was delayed until two months into the following season
1932–34	Competition Suspended					
1934–35	Swansea Town		Llanelly			
1935–37	Competition Suspended					
1937–38	Milford United		Haverfordwest			
1938–39	Swansea Town		Llanelly			
1939–47	Competition Suspended					
1947–48	Llanelly		Briton Ferry Athletic			
1948–49	Swansea Town		Llanelly			
1949–50	Swansea Town		Haverfordwest Athletic			
1950–51	Llanelly		Swansea Town			
1951–52	No Competition					
1952–53	Llanelly		Swansea Town			
1953–54	Swansea Town		Llanelly			
1954–55	Swansea Town		Llanelly			
1955–56	Swansea Town		Llanelly			
1956–57	Swansea Town		Haverfordwest			
1957–58	Swansea Town		Llanelly			
1958–59	Swansea Town		Haverfordwest			
1959–60	Swansea Town		Llanelly			
1960–61	Swansea Town		Haverfordwest			
1961–62	Swansea Town		Llanelly			
1962–63	Competition Shared		Between Swansea Town & Llanelly			
1963–64	Llanelly		Swansea Town			
1964–65	Swansea Town	3-0	Llanelli	Swansea Giorgio Chinaglia		
1965–66	Swansea Town		Llanelli			
1966–67	Ammanford Town		Llanelli			
1967–68	Llanelli		Swansea Town			
1968–70	No Competition					
1970–71	Llanelli		Swansea City			
1971–72	Pembroke Borough		Llanelli			
1972–73	Pembroke Borough		Llanelli			
1973–74	No Competition					
1974–75	Swansea City		Briton Ferry Athletic			
1975–76	Swansea City		Ammanford			
1976–77	Llanelli		Swansea City			
1977–78	Pembroke Borough		Llanelli			
1978–79	Milford United		Llanelli			
1979–80	Ammanford Town		Swansea City			
1980–81	Pembroke Borough		Haverfordwest County			
1981–82	Haverfordwest County		Pontardawe Athletic			
1982–83	Pontardawe Athletic		Milford United			
1983–84	Swansea City		Briton Ferry Athletic			
1984–85	Swansea City		Ammanford Town		Sunday May 19, 1985	at Vetch Field, Swansea
1985–86	Milford United		Swansea City			
1986–87	Swansea City		Briton Ferry Athletic			
1987–88	Swansea City		Pembroke Borough			
1988–89	Haverfordwest County		Pembroke Borough			
1989–90	Swansea City		Llanelli			
1990–91	Swansea City		Llanelli			
1991–92	Haverfordwest County		Ammanford Town			
1992–93	Haverfordwest County		West End			
1993–94	Swansea City		Ammanford			
1994–95	Swansea City		Morriston Town			
1995–96	BP Llandarcy	3-2	Swansea City	BP: Davies 2, Carpenter; Swansea: Coates 2		at Vetch Field, Swansea
1996–97	BP Llandarcy	3-1	Swansea City			
1997–98	Haverfordwest County		Swansea City		Wednesday May 6, 1998	at Bridge Meadow, Haverfordwest
1998–99	Haverfordwest County		Llanelli			
1999-00	Llanelli		Carmarthen Town			
2000–01	Competition Void					
2001–02	Swansea City	6-0	Hakin United	Swansea: Watkin, Cusack, Williams 3, Draper	Tuesday April 30, 2002	at the Vetch Field, Swansea
2002–03	Swansea City	2-1	Carmarthen Town	Swansea: Pritchard, King; Carmarthen: Unknown	Thursday May 8, 2003	at Richmond Park, Carmarthen
2003–04	Briton Ferry Athletic		Ammanford			
2004–05	Briton Ferry Athletic		Carmarthen Town			
2005–06	Haverfordwest County	3-1	Carmarthen Town	H'west: Elliott, O'Sullivan 2; Carmarthen: Thomas	April 2006	at New Bridge Meadow, Haverfordwest
2006–07	Neath Athletic	2-1	Garden Village	Neath: Rastatter OG, Price (pen); Village: Rastatter	Wednesday May 16, 2007	at Llandarcy Park, Neath
2007–08	Neath Athletic	2-1 AET	Llanelli	Neath: Pockett, Pridham; Llanelli: Follows	Tuesday April 23, 2008	at Stebonheath Park, Llanelli
2008–09	Llanelli	5-2	West End	Llanelli: Follows, Jones, Pritchard 2, Griffiths; West End: Unknown		at Stebonheath Park, Llanelli
