= Johnston, Pembrokeshire =

Village, parish and community in Pembrokeshire, Wales

Johnston
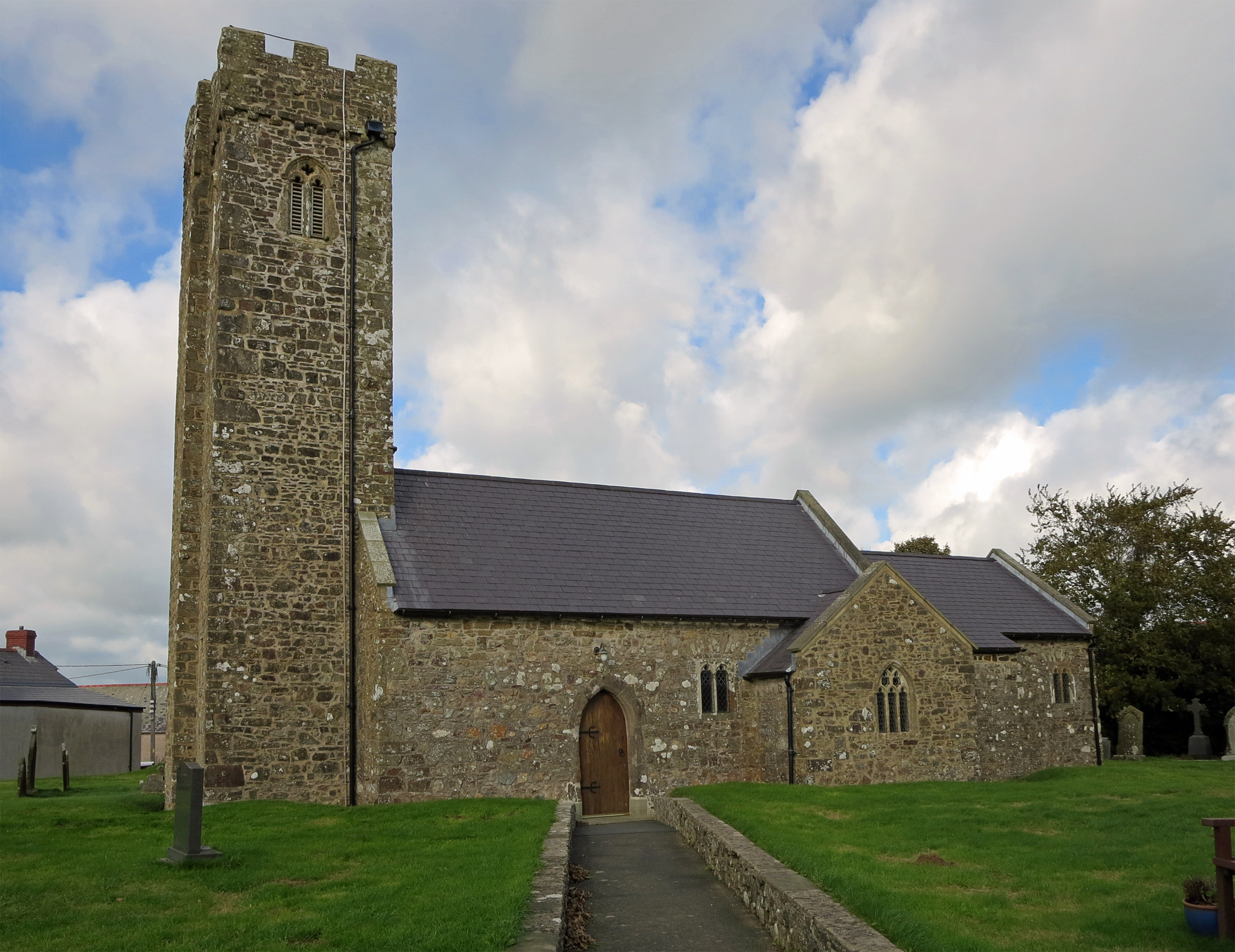
- St Peter's Church

- Location within Pembrokeshire
- Population: 1,941 (2011 census)
- OS grid reference: SM932104
- Principal area: Pembrokeshire
- Preserved county: Dyfed
- Country: Wales
- Sovereign state: United Kingdom
- Post town: HAVERFORDWEST
- Postcode district: SA62
- Dialling code: 01437
- Police: Dyfed-Powys
- Fire: Mid and West Wales
- Ambulance: Welsh
- UK Parliament: Preseli Pembrokeshire
- Senedd Cymru – Welsh Parliament: Ceredigion Penfro
- List of places UK Wales Pembrokeshire 51.75401°N 4.99760°W Map of the community

Johnston is a village, parish and community in Pembrokeshire, Wales, and a parish in the diocese of Diocese of St Davids.

It lies on the A4076 road approximately midway between Haverfordwest and Milford Haven. Until the end of the 19th century, anthracite was mined here. The village is now a dormitory for Haverfordwest and Milford Haven. The parish church has the typical tall, slim castellated tower of churches in the largely English-speaking south of Pembrokeshire, sometimes known as "Little England beyond Wales".

Originally established as an agricultural settlement, Johnston developed significantly during the 19th and early 20th centuries due to anthracite coal mining. Today, it functions largely as a commuter village.

== History ==
Johnston was founded as a small farming and mining village sometime before 1801 when 99 people lived in the village. Maps from 1579 show Johnston as an already established parish. The population steadily grew to 600 in 1951 and almost doubled in the next 10 years to 1,133. Since then Johnston has had a steady population growth.

== Demographics ==
=== Religion ===
Johnston is a majority Christian village with 62.4 per cent of people identifying as Christian, 0.2 per cent as Buddhist, 0.4 per cent as Muslim, 0.5 per cent as "Other" and 26.5 per cent as having no religion. 9.7 per cent of people did not state a religion.

=== Origin ===
The majority of people, 72.8 per cent, were born in Wales. 23.5 per cent were born elsewhere in the United Kingdom (22 per cent in England, 1.3 per cent in Scotland and 0.2 per cent in Northern Ireland). 0.3 per cent were born in Ireland; 1.2 per cent were born in countries that were members of the EU before 2001 while 0.4 per cent were born in EU countries that joined after 2001. 1.9 per cent were born in 'other countries'.

=== Identity ===
99.55 per cent of the population identifying as White; 59.8 per cent identify only as Welsh and 6.7 per cent as Welsh and British. 12.7 per cent identify only as English while 1.2 per cent identify as English and British and 1 per cent identify as English and "other". 0.8 per cent identify as Scottish only while 0.2 per cent identify as Scottish and British, and 0.2 per cent as Scottish and "other". 0.2 per cent identified as Northern Irish only. 15.5 per cent identify only as British, while 8.7 per cent identify as British and "other". 75.8 per cent have no British identity while 32.5 per cent have no Welsh identity, and 1 per cent identify as Welsh and "other".

Population
| Year | Pop. | ±% |
|---|---|---|
| 1801 | 99 | — |
| 1811 | 163 | +64.6% |
| 1821 | 186 | +14.1% |
| 1831 | 194 | +4.3% |
| 1841 | 289 | +49.0% |
| 1851 | 263 | −9.0% |
| 1881 | 209 | −20.5% |
| 1891 | 226 | +8.1% |
| 1901 | 241 | +6.6% |
| 1911 | 272 | +12.9% |
| 1921 | 322 | +18.4% |
| 1931 | 384 | +19.3% |
| 1951 | 600 | +56.2% |
| 1961 | 1,130 | +88.3% |
| 2001 | 2,249 | +99.0% |
| 2008 | 2,319 | +3.1% |
| 2010 | 2,363 | +1.9% |
| 2011 | 2,517 | +6.5% |

=== Language ===
In 2011, 11.4 per cent of inhabitants could speak Welsh, down from 13.81 per cent in 2001, but 18.5 per cent had some Welsh language ability. This is lower than the overall percentage for Pembrokeshire and Wales, which are 19.2 and 19.0 respectively.

== Governance ==
Johnston Community Council, has limited control over aspects of the running of the village.

On a county level, an electoral ward in the same name also exists. The current County Councillor is Aled Thomas, who has been the incumbent since 2022 when the previous County Councillor Kenneth Rowlands stood down.

== Education ==
Johnston CP School is a primary school with year groups, Nursery to Year 6. It has over 150 pupils. In 2017 it moved into a newly built building, previously it had been on its former site for approximately 30–35 years. Before then it was at another site in the north of Johnston.

== Transport ==
Johnston railway station serves as a railway link. Trains run in both directions every 2 hours, with two main termini being Milford Haven railway station and Manchester Piccadilly station. The station itself is unstaffed and is a request stop.

== Worship ==
The places of worship are all located at the southern end of the village. The Anglican church of St Peter, in the Diocese of St Davids, is a grade II* listed building dating from the 15th century. The nearby Baptist chapel was built in the first half of the 20th century in a modern style.

A meetinghouse for the Church of Jesus Christ of Latter-day Saints (LDS Church) was opened in December 2012 and is home to the Milford Haven Branch.

== Sport ==
A greyhound racing track existed in the village. It opened in August 1934 and was trading in 1948 but the regularity of the racing in unknown. In 1948 and 1949 the Licensing Authorities listed the track as having an attendance capacity of just 200 which is the smallest known attendance of any track. The racing was independent which means unaffiliated to the sports governing body at the time (the National Greyhound Racing Club).

Johnston A.F.C. is the villages football team. They currently play in the Pembrokeshire League Division Two.
