= St Joseph's A.F.C. =

Football club based in swansea

St Joseph's
- Full name: St Joseph's Association Football Club
- Nickname: The Saints
- Founded: 1921
- Ground: Penlan 3g ( Cae Pen Tawe )
- Chairman: Ashleigh Edwards-Davies
- Manager: Sam Carlsen/Paul Lenihan
- League: Swansea Senior League 26/27 Premier

St Joseph's A.F.C. is a Welsh football club based in the Greenhill area of Swansea. The team currently plays in the Swansea Senior Premier League.

== History ==
The Greenhill area of the city was popular with Irish people who settled there following on from immigration into the area in the nineteenth century and the founding of St Joseph's Church. In 1920, the young men who had been brought up in the community of Greenhill and educated at St Joseph's School, formed a Catholic Men Society (CMS) attached to the church. In 1921 they formed a football team playing in a Sunday School League. The strip that they wore was donated by Glasgow Celtic, brought to Swansea by a Scottish schoolteacher, Mr Marley. The Saints still play in green and white.

The club competed in the Swansea Senior League for many decades, and after finishing the 2023–24 season as champions, were promoted to the tier four West Wales Premier League for the 2024–25 season.

== Honours ==
- West Wales Premier League
  - Runners-up: 2024–25
- Swansea Senior League Division One/ Premier Division
  - Champions: 1967–68, 2005–06, 2023–24
  - Runners-up: 2018–19
- Swansea Senior League Division Two – Champions: 2012–13
- Swansea Senior League Division Three – Champions: 2011–12
- Swansea Senior League Cup – Winners: 1980–81, 2023–24
- Swansea Senior Open Cup – Winners: 1981–82, 2004–05, 2022–23
- WWFA Intermediate Cup – Winners: 1969–70, 1972–73, 1981–82, 2005–06
