= Mal Rees =

Welsh footballer (1924–2003)

Personal information
- Full name: Maldwyn James Francis Rees
- Date of birth: 21 April 1924
- Place of birth: Neath, Wales
- Date of death: 2003 (aged 78–79)
- Height: 5 ft 4 in (1.63 m)
- Position: Winger

Senior career*
Years	Team	Apps	(Gls)
1943–194?	Swansea Town	0	(0)
194?–1947	Briton Ferry Athletic		
1947–1949	Norwich City	0	(0)
1949	Briton Ferry Athletic		
1949–19??	Brighton & Hove Albion	2	(0)
19??–1950	Barry Town	22	(3)
1950–1951	Scunthorpe & Lindsey United	18	(1)
- Milford United
1952–1957	Aberystwyth Town		
- Milford United
- Port Talbot Town
- Briton Ferry Athletic
- * Club domestic league appearances and goals

Maldwyn James Francis Rees (21 April 1924 – 2003) was a Welsh footballer who played as an inside forward. He appeared in the Football League for Brighton & Hove Albion and Scunthorpe & Lindsey United, and played for many years in Welsh amateur football.

== Life and career ==
Rees was born in 1924 in Neath, which was then in Glamorgan, the youngest of six children of James Francis-Rees and his wife, Gertrude née Snow. He attended Cwrt Sart Central School in Briton Ferry, and played football as a youngster for Garthmor and for Neath schoolboys. He played for Swansea Town in the wartime competitions, regularly in 1943–44 and occasionally the following season, before joining Briton Ferry Athletic, where he was instrumental in their Welsh League Division Two West title win in 1946–47. After a trial with Norwich City at the end of that season, he turned professional with the Third Division South club. According to the Western Mail, it was "a blow to [Briton Ferry] when he signed for Norwich, because it meant that they faced their first season in Division I of the Welsh League without the 'key' man who had taken them there."

After a season during which he never appeared for Norwich's first team and was reported to have failed to settle, Rees went home to Wales. He married Peggy Bell in the summer of 1948, and resumed his career with Briton Ferry Athletic. After he was recommended to Brighton & Hove Albion by former Welsh international player Les Jones and impressed in a trial, he returned to English football, albeit briefly. He made his Football League debut on 9 September 1949, in a 1–0 win away to Newport County, but played only once more for the League side before being released. He spent what was left of the season with Barry Town, for which he made 22 Southern League appearances. Rees spent the 1950–51 season back in the Football League, under the management of Les Jones at Scunthorpe & Lindsey United, newly elected to the Third Division North. He made 18 league appearances, mostly in the first half of the season, before returning to amateur football in Wales.

Between 1952 and 1957, Rees played for Aberystwyth Town. He captained the team, played in 186 matches in which he scored 36 goals, and earned a reputation for the spectacular. A eulogistic piece on the club's website describes his 1953–54 goal of the season: "In a dazzling run from the half-way line he beat man after man, pulling out of his bag of tricks every sleight-of-foot in the soccer magician's handbook, before unleashing one of his specials." He also played for Milford United and Port Talbot Town.

Rees's death was registered in Swansea in April 2003.
