= Harry Redknapp =

English football player and manager (born 1947)

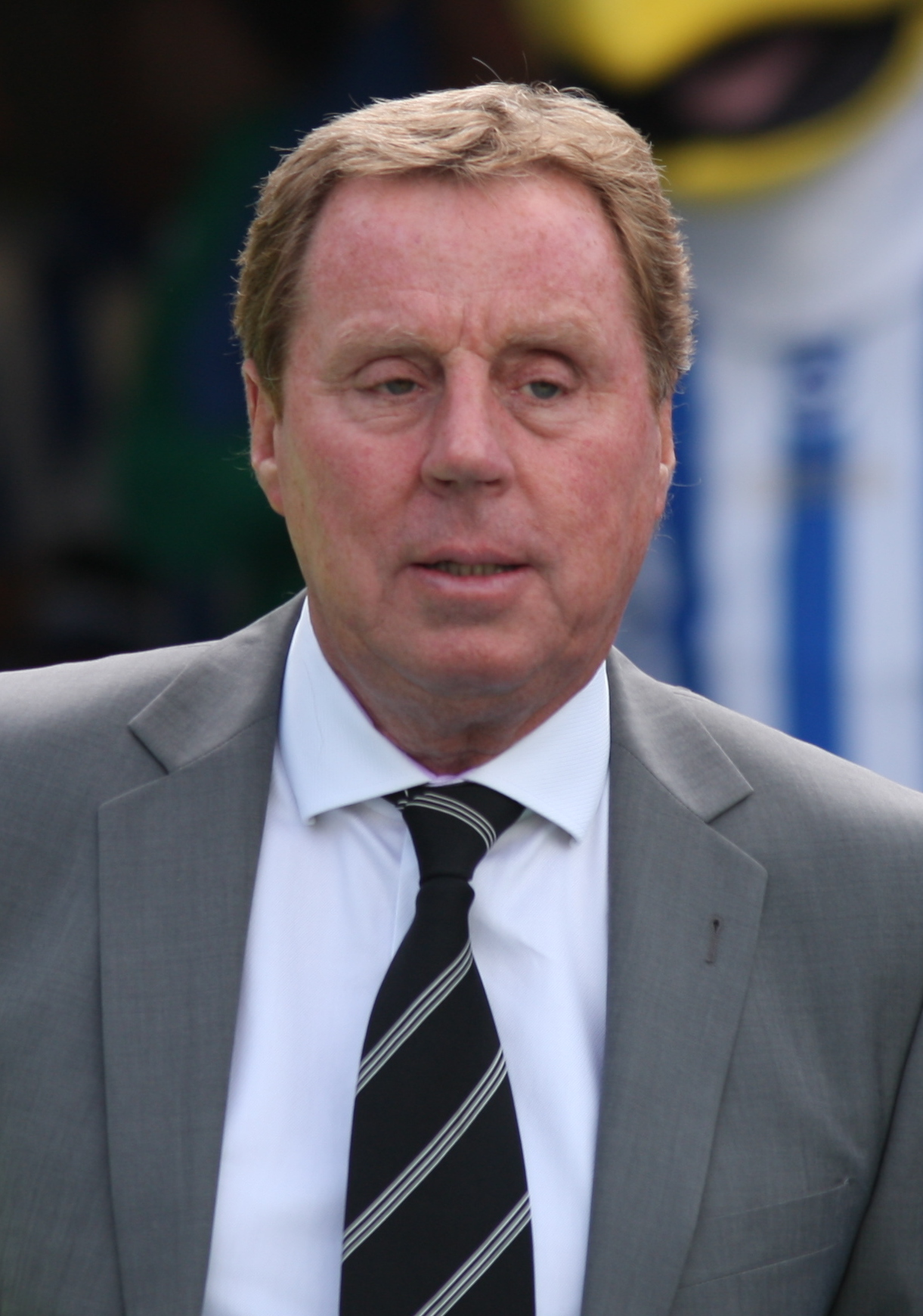
- Redknapp in 2011

Personal information
- Full name: Henry James Redknapp
- Date of birth: 2 March 1947 (age 79)
- Place of birth: Poplar, London, England
- Position: Midfielder

Youth career
- 1958–1962: Tottenham Hotspur
- 1962–1965: West Ham United

Senior career*
Years	Team	Apps	(Gls)
1965–1972	West Ham United	149	(7)
1972–1976	AFC Bournemouth	101	(5)
1976	Brentford	1	(0)
1976	Seattle Sounders	15	(0)
1976	AP Leamington	3	(0)
1977–1979	Seattle Sounders	9	(0)
1980	Phoenix Fire	0	(0)
1982	AFC Bournemouth	1	(0)
Total		279	(12)

International career
1964	England U18		

Managerial career
- 1983–1992: AFC Bournemouth
- 1994–2001: West Ham United
- 2002–2004: Portsmouth
- 2004–2005: Southampton
- 2005–2008: Portsmouth
- 2008–2012: Tottenham Hotspur
- 2012–2015: Queens Park Rangers
- 2016: Jordan
- 2017: Birmingham City
- 2023–2024: Cwm Albion
- * Club domestic league appearances and goals

Henry James Redknapp (born 2 March 1947) is an English former football manager and player. He has previously managed AFC Bournemouth, West Ham United, Portsmouth, Southampton, Tottenham Hotspur, Queens Park Rangers, and Birmingham City.

Redknapp managed Portsmouth to the 2002–03 Division One title, gaining promotion to the Premier League and preserving their top-flight status in the 2003–04 season. In his second spell at the club, he managed the side that won the 2008 FA Cup. At the conclusion of the 2009–10 season, he guided Tottenham into the UEFA Champions League.

His son, Jamie Redknapp, had played for him at Bournemouth and Southampton. He is also uncle to Frank Lampard, who played under him at West Ham United.

== Early life ==
Redknapp was born in Poplar, London, the only child of Henry Joseph William Redknapp (1922–1996) and Violet May Brown (1924–2001).

At age 15, Redknapp moved to West Ham United and played alongside Bobby Moore. In a 2008 interview, Redknapp stated as part of a tribute to Tom Finney, "I was a big Arsenal fan as a kid and I remember seeing him play against Tommy Docherty one night."

After being appointed Tottenham manager later in 2008, Redknapp stressed his Tottenham connections as well, stating:

I am a big follower of the history of the game and Tottenham have been a great club over the years. I followed Tottenham, I trained there as an 11-year-old, 12-year-old so I know the history of the club. It is a big, big club.

== Club career ==
=== West Ham United ===
During his playing career, Redknapp played as a midfielder. He began his career with Tottenham Hotspur, playing for the youth team until he was 15 years old, when he moved to West Ham United. He first broke into the first team at West Ham in the 1965–66 season, making seven appearances and scoring one goal. He made his debut for West Ham in a 1–1 draw at home to Sunderland on 23 August 1965. His first goal came in a 4–1 away win over Tottenham on 8 April 1966.

Redknapp made his first start of the 1966–67 season, and scored his second goal for the club, on 3 December 1966 in a 3–0 win over West Bromwich Albion. Redknapp made 12 League appearances scoring once during his second season. During the 1967–68 season, he made 28 League appearances and scored twice, the first in a 4–2 home win over Burnley on 21 August 1967 and the second in a 5–1 away win over Sunderland on 6 September 1967.

During the 1968–69 season, Redknapp made 42 appearances and scored three times, with 36 appearances coming in the league (along with two goals), three in the FA Cup appearances and three in the League Cup (along with one goal). His first league goal of the season came in a 4–0 win over West Brom on 31 August 1968, while the next came in a match in the League Cup against Bolton Wanderers, which West Ham won 4–0. Redknapp received a red card in a 2–0 away defeat at Leeds United on 12 October 1968. He had been booked for fouling Billy Bremner and was dismissed by the referee for dissent. His third goal of the season came in a 4–3 win over Queens Park Rangers on 2 November 1968.

Redknapp made his first appearance of the 1969–70 season on 9 August 1969 in a 1–0 home win over Newcastle United, while his first goal of the season came in a 3–0 home win over Sheffield Wednesday on 2 September 1969. Redknapp made 26 total appearances and scored one goal; 23 of his appearances came in the league.

During the 1970–71 season, Redknapp made 21 league appearances with one more coming in the League Cup. He then made a further 35 appearances during the 1971–72 season with 22 of them coming in the league. This would be his last season at the club before he moved to AFC Bournemouth for the 1972–73 season. He made 175 total appearances in both league and cup action for West Ham, scoring eight times over seven seasons.

=== AFC Bournemouth ===
Redknapp joined Third Division Bournemouth in 1972 from West Ham. He spent four seasons with the south coast side between 1972 and 1976. In the 1972–73 season, Redknapp made 37 appearances, with 34 of them coming in the league scoring once in the league and Bournemouth finished seventh in the league. He made a further 46 appearances scoring five times during the 1973–74 season with 39 appearances in the league. Redknapp made 19 (all league) appearances during the 1974–75 season as Bournemouth were relegated to the Fourth Division. In 1975–76, he only managed nine appearances.

In total, he had played 101 league matches for Bournemouth, scoring 5 goals.

At the end of the 1975–76 season, he moved to then Fourth Division side Brentford, where he made one appearance during the 1976–77 season.

=== Seattle Sounders ===
In 1976, Redknapp joined North American Soccer League (NASL) club Seattle Sounders as a player-coach. He made 15 appearances during the 1976 season as they reached the playoffs after finishing second in the Pacific Conference, Western Division, before losing to the Minnesota Kicks in the Division Championship. Before returning to Seattle, he appeared briefly for AP Leamington in the Southern League Premier Division. Redknapp then made five appearances during the 1977 season as they finished third in the Pacific Conference, Western Division, before losing out in Soccer Bowl '77 to Pelé's New York Cosmos, 2–1.

In 1980, Redknapp was contracted to play with ASL expansion team the Phoenix Fire, but the team folded in pre-season.

== International career ==
Redknapp represented England at youth level when he was 17. He was in the side that won the 1964 UEFA European Under-18 Championship after defeating Spain 4–0 in the final.

== Management and coaching career ==
=== Seattle Sounders and Oxford City ===
Redknapp began his management career as player-assistant manager of NASL club Seattle Sounders from 1976 to 1979 under Jimmy Gabriel. During his time with Seattle, Redknapp made 24 appearances, helping the side to second place in the Pacific Conference, Western Division, in his first season as player-coach, and then to third place in the Pacific Conference, Western Division, for the 1977 season, taking them to the final of the Soccer Bowl, before losing to Pelé's New York Cosmos.

During the 1978 season, Redknapp helped Seattle to a third-place finish in the National Conference, Western Division, before they lost in the first round of the playoffs, again to the New York Cosmos. In his final year in Seattle, he helped them to another third-place finish in the National Conference, Western Division, but this time they failed to qualify for the playoffs.

=== AFC Bournemouth ===
At the beginning of the 1982–83 season, Redknapp took up his first major coaching role as assistant manager to David Webb at Bournemouth, six years after leaving the club as a player. Redknapp applied for the manager's job when Webb moved to Torquay United partway through that season, but was overlooked in favour of Don Megson. Megson was sacked in late 1983 as Bournemouth were in the Third Division relegation places, and Redknapp was hired as his replacement in October 1983.

In his first season at the helm, Redknapp helped Bournemouth avoid relegation to the Fourth Division. Bournemouth also caused a shock in the FA Cup when they defeated holders Manchester United 2–0 in the third round. He led Bournemouth to victory in the inaugural Associate Members' Cup by beating Hull City in the final. Bournemouth won the Third Division title in 1987 with 97 points, breaking the club's record for the most points accumulated in a season.

After two years at this level, Bournemouth were relegated at the end of their third season. Bournemouth were in 13th position on 3 March, but injuries which depleted the squad, combined with a catastrophic loss of form, meant they won only one more match that season, and were relegated on 5 May after a 1–0 defeat at Dean Court against Leeds United.

==== Road accident ====
In June 1990, while in Italy to watch the 1990 FIFA World Cup, Redknapp was involved in a road accident along with Michael Sinclair, the chairman of York City, Fred Whitehouse, the chairman of Aston Villa, and Bournemouth's managing director, Brian Tiler. Travelling through Latina, south of Rome, at night, their chauffeur-driven minibus was in a head-on collision with a car containing three Italian soldiers. The minibus was flipped onto its roof and skidded 50 yards along the road. Sitting in the seat where Redknapp had usually sat during the trip, Tiler was killed, as were the three occupants of the other vehicle. Redknapp was doused in petrol and pulled clear of the accident by Sinclair. Redknapp suffered a fractured skull, a broken nose, cracked ribs and a gash in his left leg. Ambulance services arriving at the scene believed him dead and placed a blanket over his head. Unconscious for two days, Redknapp was flown home two weeks later in a special air ambulance paid for by Bournemouth. Though he made a full recovery, apart from losing his sense of smell and gaining a facial tic, he eventually quit Bournemouth at the end of the 1991–92 season.

=== West Ham United ===
For the next season, Redknapp was appointed assistant manager to Billy Bonds at West Ham, another of his former clubs. However, in August 1994, the club board of directors opted to turn control of the team over to Redknapp and move Bonds into an administrative role. Bonds eventually resigned outright from the club, leaving Redknapp solely in charge.

Just months before being promoted to the manager's seat at Upton Park, Redknapp was linked with the managerial vacancy at Southampton after the departure of previous manager Ian Branfoot, but the job went to Alan Ball instead.

Redknapp helped to establish the club in the FA Premier League and introduced a number of young players from the club's academy, including Michael Carrick, Joe Cole, Rio Ferdinand and Frank Lampard. The signings of Stuart Pearce, Paolo Di Canio and Trevor Sinclair helped them re-establish their careers having been signed by Redknapp. He also made mistakes in the transfer market, particularly with overseas players, including Marco Boogers, Florin Raducioiu and Paulo Futre.

Nevertheless, West Ham finished in eighth position in 1998 and fifth in 1999, which saw them qualify for the UEFA Intertoto Cup in what was their second-best ever season in the top division. In the 1999–2000 season, West Ham won the Intertoto Cup and qualified for the UEFA Cup but failed to match their performances in the Premier League. Redknapp left West Ham on 9 May 2001, one match before the end of the 2000–01 season. For some time, it was unconfirmed whether he resigned or was sacked but Redknapp shed new light on the true circumstances in October 2007:

The chairman Terry Brown had offered me a new four-year contract. What I did was talk to a fanzine, made some comments, and sometimes I should be a bit more careful. I sat down with these guys from the fanzine and they started asking me questions and I spoke to them in the way I'd talk to someone in a pub. I said a few things I shouldn't have said. He read it and got very upset. I walked into his office expecting to sign the contract and walked out without a job!

— Harry Redknapp,

=== Portsmouth ===
Redknapp became director of football for Portsmouth in 2001, and when the Leicester City manager's job became vacant with the dismissal of Peter Taylor that autumn, Redknapp was widely tipped to take over at the East Midlands club, but stayed loyal to Pompey, with the Leicester job going to Dave Bassett. It was reported in the national media that had Redknapp taken over, Bassett would have been on his coaching staff at the East Midlands club.

Redknapp kept Portsmouth in the Premier League in the 2003–04 season, but had a dispute with Portsmouth owner Milan Mandarić over his assistant Jim Smith. Redknapp had another disagreement with Mandarić over the appointment of Velimir Zajec as director of football and resigned as manager in November 2004.

=== Southampton ===
A few weeks after his departure at Portsmouth, Redknapp became manager of Southampton, a move which infuriated Portsmouth's supporters, as the two clubs are fierce local rivals. Some fans even bore T-shirts which referred to Redknapp as "Scummer" and "Judas" and called for him to "Rot in Hell".

Redknapp was tasked with keeping Southampton in the Premier League – a similar task to the one Redknapp was facing with Portsmouth, and a familiar one at the club over the previous 15 years, which he would have faced had he accepted the offer to take over a decade earlier – but ultimately was unable to achieve this, ending Southampton's 27-year spell in the top flight. Redknapp remained in charge for the 2005–06 Championship season but was unable to establish consistency needed to make Southampton promotion contenders. Redknapp was also unhappy with chairman Rupert Lowe's appointment of Clive Woodward to the club's coaching staff. After being repeatedly linked with a return to Portsmouth after they sacked Alain Perrin, Redknapp resigned as Southampton's manager in early December 2005. Lowe quoted Redknapp as referring to Portsmouth as his "spiritual home".

=== Return to Portsmouth ===
Redknapp returned to Portsmouth on 7 December 2005 with the club threatened by relegation to the Championship, although not in the relegation zone. At first it looked like Redknapp would be heading for a second successive relegation, but a fine run of form at the end of the season, aided by the takeover of Portsmouth by Alexandre Gaydamak (which provided Redknapp with more money), ensured Portsmouth's survival. In the following season, Redknapp led Portsmouth to a ninth-placed finish which was the club's highest league finish since the 1950s. In October 2007, Redknapp signed a new contract at Portsmouth lasting until 2011.

In January 2008, it emerged through the media that Redknapp was offered the vacant manager's job at Newcastle United following the sacking of Sam Allardyce. Redknapp had apparently declined the job, stating, "I have a job to do to take this club forward and to walk away would not have been the right thing to do." It was later stated by Newcastle chairman Christopher Mort that Redknapp "was interviewed for the job but he was only one of a number of people we were speaking to at that time", and at the time of Redknapp's interview the club had already been in secret talks with the eventual appointee, Kevin Keegan, for a week.

On 8 March 2008, Redknapp led Portsmouth to an FA Cup quarter-final victory over Manchester United, completing a hat-trick of FA Cup wins over Manchester United, and followed this with a semi-final victory over West Bromwich Albion at Wembley on 5 April. He guided the club to their first FA Cup Final in 69 years, where they defeated Cardiff City on 17 May 2008 to win The FA Cup 1–0, thanks to a goal scored by Nwankwo Kanu. He was the last English manager to win a major English trophy until Eddie Howe of Newcastle United won the EFL Cup in 2025.

Redknapp returned to Portsmouth to receive the Freedom of the City in a ceremony on 28 October 2008. As this event took place two days after his departure for Tottenham Hotspur, he received a mixed reception from the Portsmouth fans, despite having led the club to a long-awaited trophy in the 2008 FA Cup.

=== Tottenham Hotspur ===
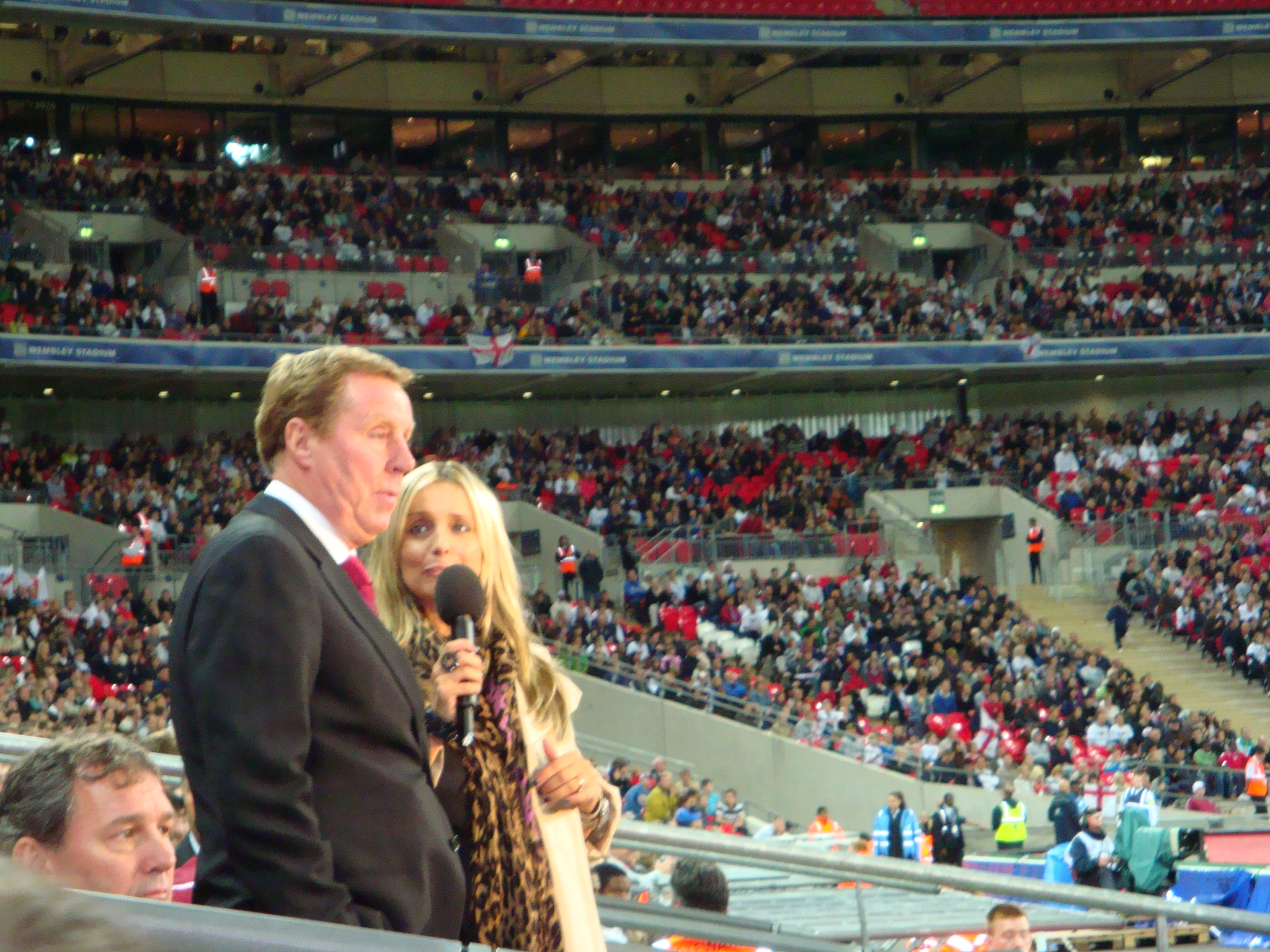
Redknapp interviewed by Louise Redknapp during Soccer Aid 2008

In October 2008, following the dismissal of Juande Ramos by Tottenham Hotspur, the club announced Redknapp had agreed to take over as the new manager at Spurs, the club where he began his playing career. Tottenham paid £5 million in compensation to Portsmouth for releasing Redknapp.

In January 2009, Redknapp signed five new players in order to add quality and much-needed depth to his squad. He brought back Jermain Defoe from his old club Portsmouth for £15.75 million and Honduran midfielder Wilson Palacios from Wigan Athletic for £12 million. Long-serving Chelsea goalkeeper Carlo Cudicini also joined on a free transfer; former Spurs player Pascal Chimbonda returned to White Hart Lane from Sunderland for a fee in the region of £3 million; and Robbie Keane, who like Chimbonda and Defoe had only left Spurs within the last year, re-joined after an unsuccessful spell at Liverpool for an initial fee of £12 million.

Redknapp made significant alterations to the squad in the summer of 2009. Striker Darren Bent was sold to Sunderland for an initial fee of £10 million, while midfielder Didier Zokora departed for Sevilla for £7.75 million. Both England international striker Peter Crouch and Croatia midfielder Niko Kranjčar arrived from Portsmouth for £9 million and £2 million respectively along with defender Sébastien Bassong from Newcastle United for £8 million.

In 2009–10, his first full campaign with the club, Redknapp guided Spurs to one of their most successful Premier League campaigns to date. Beginning with four consecutive wins, Spurs went on to finish in fourth place with 70 points, therefore gaining the chance to qualify for the UEFA Champions League via a play-off. As a result of his efforts, he won the Premier League Manager of the Year award, only the second manager to do so in a season when his side did not win the title. At the conclusion of the 2009–10 season, he guided Tottenham into the UEFA Champions League.

On 13 July 2010, it was confirmed Spurs had extended Redknapp's contract until the end of the 2013 season.

On 25 August 2010, Spurs confirmed their position in the Champions League group stage by overturning a first-leg deficit to defeat Swiss team Young Boys at White Hart Lane in the Champions League play-off. In April 2011, Spurs were eliminated in the quarter-final after a 5–0 aggregate defeat to Real Madrid.

In the 2011–12 season, Redknapp signed 40-year-old goalkeeper Brad Friedel after his contract expired with Aston Villa. He also made a season-long loan move for Manchester City striker Emmanuel Adebayor. On transfer deadline day, he signed English midfielder Scott Parker for an undisclosed fee from West Ham. Redknapp then went on to win the Premier League Manager of the Month award for September and November.

Despite leading Tottenham to their second fourth-placed finish in three years, and missing out on UEFA Champions League qualification only due to Chelsea winning the competition, Redknapp was dismissed by Tottenham on 13 June 2012, after reportedly failing to agree terms on a new contract.

=== Queens Park Rangers ===
On 24 November 2012, Redknapp, who had been working at former club Bournemouth in an advisory role, was appointed as manager of Queens Park Rangers, taking over from Mark Hughes, whose contract was terminated the previous day. QPR were bottom with only four points from 12 matches. His first match in charge of QPR came on 27 November, a 0–0 draw away to Sunderland. Redknapp earned his first win as QPR manager, and the club's first Premier League victory of the 2012–13 season, on 15 December after defeating Fulham 2–1 at Loftus Road.

On 2 January 2013, Redknapp led QPR to a 1–0 victory away from home against reigning European champions Chelsea. This was QPR's first away win in the Premier League since November 2011 and their first top flight victory at Stamford Bridge since March 1979. His first match against Tottenham since being sacked by the North London club came on 12 January 2013, with Redknapp leading QPR to a 0–0 draw at Loftus Road.

On 28 April 2013, after a 0–0 draw against fellow relegation rivals Reading, and with three matches of the season to play, QPR were relegated from the Premier League to the Championship after two seasons in the top flight. After a single season in the Championship, Redknapp managed QPR to a 1–0 victory in the Play-off Final against Derby County on 24 May 2014 at Wembley Stadium, returning the club to the Premier League. On 3 February 2015, Redknapp resigned as manager of QPR. With an imminent knee operation, Redknapp said that he could not give 100% to the job and that it would be better for someone else to take over as manager. Les Ferdinand and Chris Ramsey were placed in temporary charge. In April 2015, Redknapp expanded on his reasons for leaving QPR, stating he had also left the club because he "no longer knew who was on my side". At his time of departure, QPR were in second-last position in the Premier League with 19 points from 23 matches and a record zero points from away matches.

=== Jordan ===
In March 2016, Redknapp was appointed manager of the Jordan national team alongside his former assistant, Kevin Bond, for the country's next two qualifying matches for the 2018 FIFA World Cup. Redknapp's first match as Jordan manager, on 24 March, ended in an 8–0 win over Bangladesh. This was followed by a 5–1 defeat to Australia.

=== Birmingham City and retirement ===
On 18 April 2017, Redknapp was announced as the manager of Birmingham City until the end of the season after the resignation of Gianfranco Zola. His first match in charge was a 1–0 loss to local rivals Aston Villa. The final two matches of the season saw Redknapp's team beat Huddersfield Town 2–0, followed by a 1–0 away win at Bristol City, allowing Birmingham to escape any threat of relegation.

In May 2017, Redknapp signed a one-year deal to continue as Birmingham manager for another season. Kevin Bond was reunited with Redknapp as assistant manager, replacing the outgoing Steve Cotterill. His first signings were David Stockdale, Marc Roberts and Cheikh N'Doye.

On 16 September 2017, after five straight league defeats that left the team second bottom in the table, a statement from Birmingham City said the club were "left with no choice but to terminate the contract of the manager with immediate effect". After his sacking, Redknapp said that there was "every chance" his role as Birmingham manager would be his last managerial job. A month later, Redknapp confirmed his retirement from management after 34 years in the dugout.

On 16 February 2023, Redknapp said he would be interested in a return to club management via Leeds United after the dismissal of Jesse Marsch. On 21 February 2023, Leeds appointed Javi Gracia, putting an end to the Redknapp rumours.

=== Cwm Albion ===
On 6 December 2023, Redknapp came out of retirement aged 76 to help Swansea Senior League Division Four club Cwm Albion, in cooperation with Specsavers. He led them from bottom to 7th in the league.

== Other roles ==
In January 2016, Redknapp made a return to football as a director at Wimborne Town.

On 29 April 2016, it was announced that Redknapp was to join Australian side Central Coast Mariners as a football consultant.

In October 2017, following his departure from Birmingham City, Redknapp briefly joined League Two club Yeovil Town in a voluntary advisory role to manager Darren Way.

Since December 2020, Redknapp has been a Nexen Tire brand ambassador.

On 8 February 2021, Redknapp returned to Bournemouth to advise caretaker manager Jonathan Woodgate, though was not officially involved.

On 9 July 2021, Redknapp made a small cameo appearance in the British soap opera, EastEnders.

In 2024, Redknapp signed up to co-manage England's football team on Sunday 9 June for Soccer Aid 2024. The England team was captained by former lioness, Jill Scott, and the match was hosted at Stamford Bridge stadium against a World XI, with proceeds going to charity.

== Corruption allegations, arrest and controversy ==
On 19 September 2006, Redknapp was shown on camera by BBC Panorama taking part in what appeared to be an interest in approaching a player in a manner forbidden by FA rules. Redknapp denied that his conversation about then-Blackburn Rovers player Andy Todd with the football agent Peter Harrison amounted to "tapping up" or improperly approaching the player. Redknapp referred to Todd as a "tough bastard" during the conversation and suggested he would be interested in signing the player on a full-time basis if he was available. Redknapp told the BBC he has never taken a bung and had given Kevin Bond no reason to think otherwise and that he considers himself to be "one million percent innocent".

In the final report of the Stevens inquiry, published in June 2007, the only criticism of Redknapp concerned his ownership of a racehorse named Double Fantasy thought to have been given to him by the agent Willie McKay, which aroused some suspicion. Redknapp told the inquiry it was possible he did own the horse but insisted he had not made any money out of it because the horse was a failure and never won a race.

On 28 November 2007, Redknapp, along with Portsmouth's managing director Peter Storrie, former Portsmouth chairman Milan Mandarić, agent Willie McKay and footballer Amdy Faye had been arrested by City of London Police on suspicion of conspiracy to defraud and false accounting. Redknapp was later released without charge and announced his intention to sue the police because of his arrest, considering it as the reason for the failure of the FA to consider him for manager of the England national team after the dismissal of Steve McClaren. The High Court ruled in May 2008 that the raid by City of London Police officers, on Redknapp's home in Poole, was illegal and quashed the search warrants, calling their actions "wholly unacceptable" and ordering them to pay £1,000 damages to Redknapp as well as part of his legal costs.

Following further investigation by HM Revenue & Customs as part of the corruption enquiry, in January 2010, Redknapp was charged with two counts of cheating the public revenue, along with Milan Mandarić. The charge related to a £189,000 payment from Mandarić to Redknapp via a bank account in Monaco. The trial began at Southwark Crown Court on 23 January 2012. Part of Redknapp's defence was that he was both dyscalculic and dyslexic and therefore had difficulty in dealing with transfer contracts. He was found not guilty on both counts on 8 February 2012.

=== England manager's job ===
Redknapp's acquittal came just hours before the resignation of England national team head coach Fabio Capello. Two days later, Redknapp refused to rule himself out of the running for the job, but said it would be very difficult to combine the role with his then position as Tottenham manager. A few weeks later, the FA appointed Roy Hodgson as manager.

=== Remarks concerning England manager ===
In March 2025, Redknapp faced criticism after appearing to make a Nazi salute while referring to England manager Thomas Tuchel as a "German spy" during a charity event. He later apologised, saying the gesture was intended as a joke and had been taken out of context.

== Personal life ==
Redknapp and his wife Sandra have two sons: Jamie, a football pundit and former professional footballer; and Mark, a model. Jamie made his professional debut under his father at Bournemouth in 1990 before moving on to Liverpool and subsequently Tottenham Hotspur, later rejoining his father at Southampton before retiring in 2005. Jamie's son Beau signed for the academy of Brentford, a club Harry briefly played for, in August 2024, aged 15, and currently plays for their U18 team, also having played for their B team. Harry's grandson via his son Mark, also called Harry Redknapp, signed for Bournemouth's academy in May 2014, aged 8; he progressed through the Bournemouth youth system before playing for various non-league sides, signing for ninth-tier Andover New Street in September 2026. His nephew is manager and former England midfielder Frank Lampard Jr., whose parents are Sandra's late twin sister, Patricia, and Harry's former teammate and managerial assistant Frank Lampard Sr.

Redknapp and his wife are the fundraising presidents for the Southampton-based charity Leukaemia Busters, a role they took over in 2004 from former cricketer David Gower and his wife Thorunn.

Redknapp and his wife also own a property development company, Pierfront Developments. In August 2011, it was announced that a housing development their company was building in Southsea, Hampshire, would go ahead without affordable housing. The £600,000 they offered to the council to build affordable homes elsewhere was accepted by the council. Opponents of the scheme estimated this will only be enough to build eight homes instead of the 28 that council policy says they should be building in this development. In October 2019, planning permission was granted for the company to convert a homeless shelter in Bournemouth into flats, despite pleas from residents who told planning authorities that the development would exacerbate homelessness and put their welfare at risk.

In January 2011, Redknapp was mugged while attending a football match in Madrid. On 2 November 2011, he had an operation to unblock coronary arteries. Redknapp wrote for the online gambling company, Betfair, as its "Euro 2012 columnist".

In 1998 Redknapp published his autobiography, Harry Redknapp: My Autobiography. It was co-written with Derek McGovern. His second autobiography, Always Managing, was published in 2013. It was ghostwritten by journalist Martin Samuel.

Redknapp was a contestant in the 2018 series of I'm a Celebrity...Get Me Out of Here! He subsequently won the show, and was crowned 'King of the Jungle'.

Redknapp is the owner of racehorse, "Shakem Up'Arry" which won the TrustATrader Plate Handicap Chase at the 2024 Cheltenham Festival and "The Jukebox Man" who won the 2025 King George VI Chase at Kempton Park Racecourse.

In 2026, he was one of the 'All Stars' contestants in series 2 of I'm a Celebrity... South Africa, first aired on ITV on Easter Monday 6 April 2026.

== Career statistics ==
=== Player ===
Appearances and goals by club, season and competition
Club	Season	League		National Cup		League Cup		Total	
Club	Season	Apps	Goals	Apps	Goals	Apps	Goals	Apps	Goals
West Ham United	1965–66	7	1	0	0	0	0	7	1
West Ham United	1966–67	12	1	0	0	0	0	12	1
West Ham United	1967–68	28	2	0	0	3	0	31	2
West Ham United	1968–69	36	2	3	0	3	1	42	3
West Ham United	1969–70	23	1	1	0	2	0	26	1
West Ham United	1970–71	21	0	0	0	1	0	22	0
West Ham United	1971–72	22	0	4	0	9	0	35	0
West Ham United	Total	149	7	8	0	18	1	175	8
AFC Bournemouth	1972–73	34	1	1	0	2	0	37	1
AFC Bournemouth	1973–74	39	4	3	0	4	1	46	5
AFC Bournemouth	1974–75	19	0	0	0	0	0	19	0
AFC Bournemouth	1975–76	9	0	2	0	1	0	12	0
AFC Bournemouth	Total	101	5	6	0	7	1	114	6
Brentford	1976–77	1	0	0	0	0	0	1	0
Brentford	Total	1	0	0	0	0	0	1	0
Seattle Sounders	1976	15	0	–		–		15	0
Seattle Sounders	1977	5	0	–		–		5	0
Seattle Sounders	1978	3	0	–		–		3	0
Seattle Sounders	1979	1	0	–		–		1	0
Seattle Sounders	Total	24	0	–		–		24	0
AFC Bournemouth	1982–83	1	0	0	0	1	0	2	0
AFC Bournemouth	Total	1	0	0	0	1	0	2	0
Career total		276	12	14	0	26	2	316	14

=== Manager ===
As of 16 September 2017

Team	From	To	Record				
Team	From	To	G	W	D	L	Win %
AFC Bournemouth	19 October 1983	9 June 1992	457	180	107	170	39.39
West Ham United	10 August 1994	9 May 2001	327	121	85	121	37.00
Portsmouth	25 March 2002	24 November 2004	116	54	26	36	46.55
Southampton	8 December 2004	2 December 2005	49	13	21	15	26.53
Portsmouth	7 December 2005	26 October 2008	128	54	29	45	42.19
Tottenham Hotspur	26 October 2008	13 June 2012	198	98	50	50	49.49
Queens Park Rangers	24 November 2012	3 February 2015	105	36	26	43	34.29
Jordan	15 March 2016	29 March 2016	2	1	0	1	50.00
Birmingham City	18 April 2017	16 September 2017	13	4	1	8	30.77
Total			1,395	561	345	489	40.22

== Honours ==
=== Player ===
England U18

- UEFA European Under-18 Championship: 1964

=== Manager ===
Bournemouth

- Football League Third Division: 1986–87
- Associate Members' Cup: 1983–84

West Ham United

- UEFA Intertoto Cup: 1999

Portsmouth

- Football League First Division: 2002–03
- FA Cup: 2007–08

Tottenham Hotspur

- Football League Cup runner-up: 2008–09

Queens Park Rangers

- Football League Championship play-offs: 2014

Individual

- Premier League Manager of the Season: 2009–10
- Premier League Manager of the Month: November 1998, April 2004, October 2004, March 2005, April 2006, August 2009, September 2011, November 2011

== See also ==
- List of football managers with the most matches

== Bibliography ==
=== Autobiography ===
- Harry Redknapp: My Autobiography (CollinsWillow, 1998) ISBN 9780002188722
- Always Managing: My Autobiography (Ebury Press, 2013) ISBN 9780091917876
- A Man Walks On To a Pitch: Stories from a Life in Football (Ebury Press, 2014) ISBN 9780091955526
- It Shouldn't Happen to a Manager (Ebury Press, 2016) ISBN 9781785034565
