= WWFA Intermediate Cup =

Regional knock-out competition for clubs

- Region: Wales
- Current champions: Hakin United
- Most championships: West End/ Ragged School (7 titles)
- 2025–26

The West Wales Intermediate Challenge Cup is the regional knock-out competition for clubs beneath the umbrella of the West Wales Football Association, at the level of Tier 4 and below of the Welsh Football Pyramid in South West Wales.

The tournament invites clubs typically from the top divisions of the Carmarthenshire League, Neath & District League, Pembrokeshire League and Swansea Senior League.

== History ==
The competition started in the 1923–24 season and was known until the 1973–74 season as the West Wales Amateur Cup. Since the 1974–75 season it has been called the Intermediate Cup but is also commonly referred to as the West Wales Cup.

== Recent finals ==
| Season | Winners | Score | Runners-up | Scorers | Date | Other info |
|---|---|---|---|---|---|---|
| 2012–13 | Johnston | 3–2 | Penlan Club | | 8 May 2013 | at Liberty Stadium, Swansea |
| 2013–14 | Penlan Club | 5–3 | Seaside | | | |
| 2014–15 | Team Swansea | 10–0 | Ystradgynlais | | 27 April 2015 | at Liberty Stadium, Swansea |
| 2015–16 | Goodwick United | 2–1 | Morriston Olympic | | 3 May 2016 | at Liberty Stadium, Swansea |
| 2016–17 | Team Swansea | 1–0 | CRC Rangers | | | at Liberty Stadium, Swansea |
| 2017–18 | Goodwick United | 1–0 | Penlan Club | | | at Liberty Stadium, Swansea |
| 2018–19 | Merlins Bridge | 3–1 | Carew | | 7 May 2019 | at Liberty Stadium, Swansea |
| 2021–22 | Seven Sisters Onllwyn | 1–1 FT, 2–2 AET, Penalty Shoot Out | Trostre | | 12 May 2022 | at Liberty Stadium, Swansea |
| 2022–23 | Penlan Club | 2–1 | Hakin United | | 11 May 2023 | at Liberty Stadium, Swansea |
| 2023–24 | Penlan Club | 2–1 | Llangyfelach | | 14 May 2024 | at Liberty Stadium, Swansea |
| 2024–25 | Hakin United | 3–2 | Tenby | | 15 May 2025 | at Swansea.com Stadium, Swansea |
| 2025–26 | Hakin United | 1–0 | Penlan Club | | 14 May 2026 | at Swansea.com Stadium, Swansea |

== Previous winners ==
=== 1920s ===
- 1923–24: – Swansea Amateurs
- 1924–25: – Cwm Athletic
- 1925–26: – Swansea Town
- 1926–27: – Cwm Athletic
- 1927–28: – Cwm Athletic
- 1928–29: – Aberpergwm
- 1929–30: – Cwm Athletic

=== 1930s ===
- 1930–31: – Llanelli A
- 1931–32: – Alexandra
- 1932–33: – Skewen
- 1933–34: – Royal Fusiliers
- 1934–35: – Glynneath Welfare
- 1935–36: – Hafod Brotherhood
- 1936–37: – Alexandra
- 1937–38: – Alexandra
- 1938–39: – Swansea Nomads
- 1939–40: – No competition

=== 1940s ===
- 1940–41: – No competition
- 1941–42: – No competition
- 1942–43: – Gwalia Stars
- 1943–44: – Loughor Rovers
- 1944–45: – Loughor Rovers
- 1945–46: – Grovesend Welfare
- 1946–47: – Royal Naval Air Station
- 1947–48: – Bwlch Rangers
- 1948–49: – No competition
- 1949–50: – Goodwick United

=== 1950s ===
- 1950–51: – National Oil Refineries
- 1951–52: – Atlas Sports
- 1952–53: – Atlas Sports
- 1953–54: – Clydach United
- 1954–55: – Grovesend Welfare
- 1955–56: – N.O.R. Sports
- 1956–57: – Hakin United
- 1957–58: – Narberth
- 1958–59: – Ynysmeudwy
- 1959–60: – Clydach

=== 1960s ===
- 1960–61: – Llanelli
- 1961–62: – Llanelli Steel
- 1962–63: – Ammanford United
- 1963–64: – Llanelli Steel
- 1964–65: – Llanelli Steel
- 1965–66: – Pengelli
- 1966–67: – Pengelli
- 1967–68: – Ragged School
- 1968–69: – West End
- 1969–70: – St. Joseph's

=== 1970s ===
- 1970–71: – North End
- 1971–72: – Hafod Brotherhood
- 1972–73: – St. Joseph's
- 1973–74: – Fishguard Sports
- 1974–75: – West End
- 1975–76: – Swansea Boys Club
- 1976–77: – Velindre Sports
- 1977–78: – West End
- 1978–79: – Swansea Boys Club
- 1979–80: – Bonymaen Colts

=== 1980s ===
- 1980–81: – Ragged School
- 1981–82: – St. Joseph's
- 1982–83: – West End
- 1983–84: – Winch Wen
- 1984–85: – Suburbs
- 1985–86: – North End
- 1986–87: – Maltsters Sports
- 1986–87: – Port Tennant Colts
- 1988–89: – Trostre Sports
- 1989–90: – Competition Void

=== 1990s ===
- 1990–91: – Ragged School
- 1991–92: – North End
- 1992–93: – Ragged School
- 1993–94: – West End
- 1994–95: – Ragged School
- 1995–96: – Treboeth United
- 1996–97: – Brunswick United
- 1997–98: – West End
- 1998–99: – Hakin United
- 1999–2000: – Mountain Dew Rovers

=== 2000s ===
- 2000–01: – Ragged School
- 2001–02: – West End
- 2002–03: – Seaside
- 2003–04: – Hakin United
- 2004–05: – Winch Wen
- 2005–06: – St. Joseph's
- 2006–07: – Winch Wen
- 2007–08: – Seaside
- 2008–09: – South Gower
- 2009–10: – Coelbren Athletic

=== 2010s ===
- 2010–11: – Ragged School
- 2011–12: – Dafen Welfare
- 2012–13: – Johnston
- 2013–14: – Penlan Club
- 2014–15: – Team Swansea
- 2015–16: – Goodwick United
- 2016–17: – Team Swansea
- 2017–18: – Goodwick United
- 2018–19: – Merlins Bridge
- 2019–20: – Competition cancelled due to Covid-19 pandemic

=== 2020s ===
- 2020–21: – Competition cancelled due to Covid-19 pandemic
- 2021–22: – Seven Sisters Onllwyn
- 2022–23: – Penlan Club
- 2023–24: – Penlan Club
- 2024–25: – Hakin United
- 2025–26: – Hakin United

=== Number of competition wins ===
- Ragged School – 7
- West End – 7
- Hakin United – 5
- Cwm Athletic – 4
- St. Joseph's – 4
- Alexandra – 3
- Goodwick United – 3
- Hafod Brotherhood/ Swansea Nomads – 3
- Llanelli Steel - 3
- North End – 3
- Penlan Club – 3
- Seaside – 3
- Winch Wen – 3
- Atlas Sports – 2
- Grovesend Welfare – 2
- Llanelli / Llanelli A – 2
- Loughor Rovers – 2
- National Oil Refineries - 2
- Pengelli - 2
- Swansea Boys Club – 2
- Team Swansea - 2
- Aberpergwm – 1
- Ammanford United – 1
- Bonymaen Colts - 1
- Brunswick United – 1
- Bwlch Rangers – 1
- Clydach - 1
- Clydach United – 1
- Coelbren Athletic – 1
- Dafen Welfare – 1
- Fishguard Sports – 1
- Glynneath Welfare – 1
- Gwalia Stars – 1
- Johnston – 1
- Maltsters Sports – 1
- Merlins Bridge – 1
- Mountain Dew Rovers - 1
- Narberth - 1
- Port Tennant Colts – 1
- Royal Naval Air Station - 1
- Royal Fusiliers - 1
- Seven Sisters Onllwyn – 1
- Skewen - 1
- South Gower – 1
- Suburbs - 1
- Swansea Amateurs – 1
- Swansea Town – 1
- Treboeth United – 1
- Trostre Sports – 1
- Velindre Sports - 1
- Ynysmeudwy - 1
