= Merlins Bridge A.F.C. =

Association football club in Wales

Merlins Bridge
- Full name: Merlins Bridge Association Football Club
- Nickname: The Wizards
- Ground: Pembroke Road
- Chairman: Jason Chapman
- Manager: Mike Preddy
- League: Pembrokeshire League Division One
- 2025–26: Pembrokeshire League Division One, 6th of 12
- Website: www.merlinsbridgefc.co.uk
Home colours	Away colours

Merlins Bridge A.F.C. are a Welsh football club from Haverfordwest, Pembrokeshire in the southwest of Wales. They currently play in the Pembrokeshire League Division One. They are one of the league's most successful clubs, having won the Division One championship eleven times.

== History ==
The club joined the Pembrokeshire League for the 1963–64 season.

== Ground ==
The club initially played at Merlins Bridge Playing Field, from its foundation until September 1981 when it moved to the Lower Racecourse. For the 2022–23 season the club moved to Pembrokeshire Sports Village, a newly-built 4G pitch at Haverfordwest High VC School, with the plan of returning to Merlins Bridge for 2023–24. They played there until 2026, moving to Pembroke Road ahead of the 2026–27 season.

== Honours ==
- Pembrokeshire League
  - Division One - Champions (11): 1978–79; 1979–80; 1987–88; 1988–89; 1990–91; 1992–93; 1994–95; 1995–96; 2007–08; 2009–10; 2011–12
  - Division One - Runners-Up (8): 1977–78; 1980–81; 1989–90; 1991–92; 2005–06; 2014–15; 2016–17; 2018–19
  - Division Two - Champions (2): 1977–78 (reserves); 1986–87;
  - Division Two - Runners-Up (4): 1966–67; 1968–69 (reserves); 1973–74; 2018–19 (reserves)
  - Division Three - Runners-Up (4): 1965–66; 1976–77 (reserves); 1991–92 (reserves); 2015–16 (reserves)
  - Division Four – Champions: 1987–88 (reserves)
  - Division Five – Champions: 1986–87 (reserves)
  - Reserves Division One - Champions (3): 2004–05 (reserves); 2005–06 (reserves); 2007–08 (reserves)
  - Reserves Division One - Runners-Up (4): 1995–96 (reserves); 1998–99 (reserves); 2002–03 (reserves); 2006–07 (reserves)
- Pembrokeshire Senior Cup
  - Winners (9): 1977–78; 1978–79; 1979–80; 1986–87; 1989–90; 1995–96; 2003–04; 2016–17; 2018–19
  - Finalists (6): 1969–70; 1992–93; 1994–95; 2008–09; 2009–10; 2013–14
- West Wales Intermediate Challenge Cup
  - Winners: 2018–19
