= Ragged School F.C. =

Association football club in Wales

Ragged School
- Full name: Ragged School Football Club
- Founded: 1949
- League: Swansea Senior League Division One
- 2025–26: Swansea Senior League Division One, 1st of 10

Ragged School Football Club is an amateur Welsh football team based in Swansea, Wales. They play in the Swansea Senior League Division One.

== History ==
Founded in 1949 by Glyn Cole and named after Swansea's Ragged School, the team has seen national success, winning the FAW Trophy four times - the last time in the 2008–09 season when they beat Penycae. After Cole's death the club was run by his nephew, Maurice Hogg, for over fifty years.

They have also been winners of the West Wales Cup seven times.

Additionally they are considered one of the most successful teams in the Swansea Senior Football League, having won the competition's senior cup 14 times and having been crowned champions of the league's top division nine times.

The club withdrew from Division One of the Swansea Senior League in 2015–16 season and rejoined the league in Division Three for the 2017–18 season, finishing as divisional runners-up and gaining promotion to Division Two.

== Honours ==
- FAW Trophy – Winners (4): 1989–90, 1998–99, 2000–01, 2008–09
- West Wales Intermediate Challenge Cup – Winners (7; joint record): 1967–68, 1980–81, 1990–91, 1992–93, 1994–95, 2000–01, 2010–11
- Swansea Senior Football League Division One – Champions (9): 1977–78, 1981–82, 1983–84, 1991–92, 1999–00, 2000–01, 2007–08, 2008–09, 2009–10
- Swansea Senior Football League Division One (Tier 6) - Winners: 2025–26
- Swansea Senior Football League Division One – Runners-up (including): 2006–07, 2013–14
- Swansea Senior Football League Division Three – Runners-up: 2017–18
- Swansea Senior Football League Senior Cup – Winners (14 including): 1977–78, 1979–80, 1990–91, 1991–92, 1992–93, 2000–01, 2011–12, 2013–14
- Swansea Senior Football League Open Cup – Winners (7):
- Swansea Senior Football League Gwalia Cup – Winners (1): 2017–18

== Bibliography ==
- Swansea Senior Football League 1901-2001: 100 Years of Local Soccer. Swansea Senior Football League. 2000. ISBN 0-9532038-3-2.
