= Cwm Albion F.C. =

Association football club in Wales

Cwm Albion
- Full name: Cwm Albion Football Club
- Ground: Cwm Level Park
- Manager: Kyle Lewis
- League: Swansea Senior League Division Two
- 2024–25: Swansea Senior League Division Two, 4th of 9
Home colours

Cwm Albion Football Club is a football club based in Plasmarl, Swansea, Wales. They are currently members of the Swansea Senior League Division Two.

== History ==
Although there have been several clubs with the name Cwm Albion (plus the earlier Cwm Albions), the earliest reference to the current club is from 1985. Throughout their history they have played in the Swansea Senior League.

In the 2022–23 season, the club lost all 22 games with a minus 191 goal difference. On 6 December 2023, Harry Redknapp came out of managerial retirement at the age of 76 to help the club in cooperation with Specsavers and led them from bottom to 7th in the league. The team is now managed by Kyle Lewis.

In 2025 they won the Maes-y-Gollen Cup, their first trophy in 74 years, beating Talycopa 2–1 in their first final since 1999. In the 2025–26 season they won promotion to Division One.

== Colours ==
The club wears red and black stripes.
