= Penclawdd A.F.C. =

Football club based in Swansea

Penclawdd
- Nickname: The Donks
- Ground: Dan-Y-Graig
- League: Swansea Senior League Premier Division
- 2025–26: Swansea Senior League Premier Division, 3rd of 11

Penclawdd A.F.C. is a Welsh football club based in Penclawdd, Swansea. The team currently plays in the Swansea Senior League Premier Division.

The club has competed in the Welsh Cup, most recently in 2023–24, where they lost to Penrhiwceiber Rangers in the second qualifying round.

The club also has a women's team, which has faced Cardiff City in the FAW Women's Cup.

== Honours ==
- Swansea Senior Football League Division One (level 2) - Champions: 2023–24
- Swansea Senior Football League Gwalia Cup - Winners: 2023–24
- Swansea Senior Football League Open Cup - Winners: 2024–25, 2025–26
- Swansea Senior Football League Senior Cup - Winners: 2025–26
