= Johnston A.F.C. =

Association football club in Wales

Johnston
- Full name: Johnston Association Football Club
- Nickname: The Tigers
- Ground: Glebelands Field
- League: Pembrokeshire League Division Two
- 2024–25: Pembrokeshire League Division Two, 5th of 12

Johnston A.F.C. are a Welsh football club from Johnston, Pembrokeshire in the southwest of Wales. They currently play in the Pembrokeshire League Division Two.

== History ==
The club joined the Pembrokeshire League as a division three side for the 1965–66 season, finishing in eighth place. The team's most memorable period was in the 1980s when they won three Division One championships in a row, as well as finishing runners-up on a further four occasions.

== Honours ==
- Pembrokeshire League Division One - Champions (3) 1980–81; 1981–82; 1982–83
- Pembrokeshire League Division One - Runners-Up (5): 1979–80; 1983–84; 1985–86; 1987–88; 2012–13
- Pembrokeshire League Division Two - Champions (1) 1976–77
- Pembrokeshire League Division Two - Runners-Up (2) 2004–05; 2009–10
- Pembrokeshire League Division Three - Champions (1): 1980–81 (second team)
- Pembrokeshire League Division Three - Runners-Up (1): 1967–68
- Pembrokeshire League Division Four - Runners-Up (1): 2010–11 (second tram)
- Pembrokeshire League Reserves Division Two - Winners (1): 2002–03
- Pembrokeshire League Reserves Division Two - Runners-Up (1): 2004–05
- Pembrokeshire Senior Cup - Winners (3): 1981–82; 1984–85; 2012–13
- Pembrokeshire Senior Cup - Runners-Up (2): 1982–83; 1989–90
- West Wales Intermediate Challenge Cup – Winners: 2012–13
- West Wales Intermediate Challenge Cup – Runners-Up: 1981–82
