= Pembrokeshire Senior Cup =

Association football tournament in Wales

- Founded: 1946
- Region: Wales
- Current champions: Goodwick United
- Most championships: Hakin United (13 titles)
- 2025–26

The Pembrokeshire Senior Cup is a football knockout tournament involving teams from in Pembrokeshire, West Wales who play in leagues administered and associated with the Pembrokeshire Association Football League.

== Past winners ==
Since the league began the following clubs have been senior cup winners:

=== 1940s ===
- 1946–47: – RNAS Dale
- 1947–48: – Narberth
- 1948–49: – Pembroke Borough
- 1949–50: – HMS Harrier

=== 1950s ===
- 1950–51: – RAF (Pembroke Dock)
- 1951–52: – Goodwick United
- 1952–53: – RAF (Pembroke Dock)
- 1953–54: – RA Manobier
- 1954–55: – Goodwick United
- 1955–56: – RAF (Pembroke Dock)
- 1956–57: – Narberth
- 1957–58: – Clynderwen
- 1958–59: – Hakin United
- 1959–60: – Milford United

=== 1960s ===
- 1960–61: – Milford United
- 1961–62: – Milford United
- 1962–63: – Milford United
- 1963–64: – HMS Goldcrest
- 1964–65: – Fishguard Sports
- 1965–66: – Fishguard Sports
- 1966–67: – Fishguard Sports
- 1967–68: – Fishguard Sports
- 1968–69: – Hakin United
- 1969–70: – HMS Goldcrest

=== 1970s ===
- 1970–71: – Final not played
- 1971–72: – Fishguard Sports
- 1972–73: – Fishguard Sports
- 1973–74: – Carew
- 1974–75: – Fishguard Sports
- 1975–76: – Carew
- 1976–77: – Monkton Swifts
- 1977–78: – Merlins Bridge
- 1978–79: – Merlins Bridge
- 1979–80: – Merlins Bridge

=== 1980s ===
- 1980–81: – Monkton Swifts
- 1981–82: – Johnston
- 1982–83: – New Hedges/ Saundersfoot
- 1983–84: – Carew
- 1984–85: – Johnston
- 1985–86: – Carew
- 1986–87: – Merlins Bridge
- 1987–88: – Goodwick United
- 1988–89: – Fishguard Sports
- 1989–90: – Merlins Bridge

=== 1990s ===
- 1990–91: – New Hedges/ Saundersfoot
- 1991–92: – New Hedges/ Saundersfoot
- 1992–93: – Monkton Swifts
- 1993–94: – Saundersfoot Sports
- 1994–95: – Narberth
- 1995–96: – Merlins Bridge
- 1996–97: – Pennar Robins
- 1997–98: – Narberth
- 1998–99: – Goodwick United
- 1999–2000: – Hakin United

=== 2000s ===
- 2000–01: – Hakin United
- 2001–02: – Hakin United
- 2002–03: – Hakin United
- 2003–04: – Merlins Bridge
- 2004–05: – St Ishmaels
- 2005–06: – Hakin United
- 2006–07: – Monkton Swifts
- 2007–08: – Pennar Robins
- 2008–09: – Hakin United
- 2009–10: – Goodwick United

=== 2010s ===
- 2010–11: – Hakin United
- 2011–12: – Hakin United
- 2012–13: – Johnston
- 2013–14: – Tenby
- 2014–15: – Goodwick United
- 2015–16: – Goodwick United
- 2016–17: – Merlins Bridge
- 2017–18: – Hakin United
- 2018–19: – Merlins Bridge
- 2019–20: – Competition cancelled due to the COVID-19 pandemic

=== 2020s ===
- 2020–21: – Competition cancelled due to the COVID-19 pandemic
- 2021–22: – Hakin United
- 2022–23: – Goodwick United
- 2023–24: – Clarbeston Road
- 2024–25: – Hakin United
- 2025–26: – Goodwick United

=== Number of cup wins by clubs (since 1946–47) ===
- Hakin United – 13
- Merlins Bridge – 9
- Goodwick United – 9
- Fishguard Sports – 8
- Carew – 4
- Milford United – 4
- Monkton Swifts – 4
- Narberth – 4
- Johnston – 3
- New Hedges/Saundersfoot – 3
- RAF (Pembroke Dock) – 3
- HMS Goldcrest – 2
- Pennar Robins – 2
- Clarbeston Road – 1
- Clynderwen – 1
- HMS Harrier – 1
- Pembroke Borough – 1
- RA Manorbier – 1
- RNAS Dale – 1
- Saundersfoot Sports – 1
- St Ishmaels – 1
- Tenby – 1

== See also ==
- Carmarthenshire Senior Cup - a similar competition in neighbouring Carmarthenshire.
