= Pembrokeshire League =

Association football league in Wales

- Country: Wales
- Divisions: 5
- Number of clubs: 60
- Level on pyramid: 5–9
- Promotion to: West Wales Premier League
- Current champions: Hakin United (2025–26)
- Most championships: Hakin United (21 titles since 1945)
- Website: https://pembrokeshireleague.wales/

The Pembrokeshire League (currently the Manderwood Pembrokeshire League) is a football league in Pembrokeshire, West Wales, running from levels five to nine of the Welsh football league system.

Teams promoted from Division One may enter the West Wales Premier League if standards and facilities fall into line with the regulations of the Welsh Football League.

The Pembrokeshire League also enters teams into the West Wales Intermediate Cup, to play against clubs from the Carmarthenshire League, Neath & District League and Swansea Senior League. With Merlins Bridge beating fellow Pembrokeshire league side Carew in the 2019 final, this meant four of the last seven winners had been Pembrokeshire League teams.

== History ==
Newspaper articles from the early 1900s show the league existed in the pre-World War One period. In the 1930s there were separate regionalised leagues within Pembrokeshire. By 1933 the leagues had merged to form a single Pembrokeshire League. The league was reformed for the 1945–46 season, and has played continuously since.

=== Clubs who have played in the Welsh Football League ===
The following teams from the league have played in the Welsh Football League across the following years:

- Haverfordwest County
- Milford United (1936–37 to 2003–04 seasons)
- Monkton Swifts (1994–95 to 1999–2000 seasons)
- Pembroke Borough (1946–47 to 1994–95 seasons)

== Member clubs for 2026–27 season ==
=== Division One ===
- Carew
- Fishguard Sports
- Goodwick United
- Hakin United
- Merlins Bridge
- Milford United
- Monkton Swifts
- Narberth
- Neyland
- Pennar Robins
- St Ishmaels
- Tenby

=== Division Two ===
- Camrose
- Clarbeston Road
- Goodwick United (reserves)
- Hakin United (reserves)
- Johnston
- Kilgetty
- Merlins Bridge (reserves)
- Monkton Swifts (reserves)
- New Hedges/ Saundersfoot United
- Pendine
- Solva
- Tenby (reserves)

=== Division Three ===
- Angle
- Broad Haven
- Camrose (reserves)
- Carew (reserves)
- Clarbeston Road (reserves)
- Herbrandston
- Kilgetty (reserves)
- Lawrenny
- Letterston
- Pembroke Borough
- St Clears
- St Florence United

=== Division Four ===
- Fishguard Sports (reserves)
- Johnston (reserves)
- Manorbier United
- Milford Athletic
- Milford United (reserves)
- Newport Tigers
- Neyland (reserves)
- Pennar Robins (reserves)
- Prendergast Villa
- Solva (reserves)
- St Clears (reserves)
- St Ishmaels (reserves)

=== Division Five ===
- Broad Haven (reserves)
- Herbrandston (reserves)
- Kilgetty (thirds)
- Lawrenny (reserves)
- Letterston (reserves)
- Milford Athletic (reserves)
- Milford United (thirds)
- Narberth (thirds)
- New Hedges/ Saundersfoot United (reserves)
- Pembroke Borough (reserves)
- Pendine (reserves)
- Prendergast Villa (reserves)

== Champions: Top division ==
=== 1900s ===
- 1901–02: Milford United
- 1902–03:
- 1903–04: Pembroke Dock
- 1904–05: Milford Haven
- 1905–06: 2nd Wiltshire Regiment
- 1906–07: 2nd Wiltshire Regiment
- 1907–08: Milford United
- 1908–09: Milford United
- 1909–10: Milford Priory Mission
- 1910–11:
- 1911–12:
- 1912–13:
- 1913–14: Milford Town

A full list of the league's top flight champions since 1945–46 is as follows:

=== 1940s ===
- 1945–46: RA Manorbier
- 1946–47: RNAS Dale
- 1947–48: Milford United
- 1948–49: Pembroke Borough
- 1959–50: Milford United

=== 1950s ===
- 1950–51: Goodwick United
- 1951–52: Hakin United
- 1952–53: RA Manorbier
- 1953–54: RAF (Pembroke Dock)
- 1954–55: Hakin United
- 1955–56: RAF (Pembroke Dock)
- 1956–57: Narberth
- 1957–58: Narberth
- 1958–59: Narberth
- 1959–60: Narberth

=== 1960s ===
- 1960–61: Haverfordwest County
- 1961–62: Fishguard Sports
- 1962–63: Milford United
- 1963–64: Hakin United
- 1964–65: Pembroke Borough
- 1965–66: Fishguard Sports
- 1966–67: Fishguard Sports
- 1967–68: St Clears
- 1968–69: Hakin United
- 1969–70: Fishguard Sports

=== 1970s ===
- 1970–71: Carew
- 1971–72: Fishguard Sports
- 1972–73: Fishguard Sports
- 1973–74: Fishguard Sports
- 1974–75: Fishguard Sports
- 1975–76: Fishguard Sports
- 1976–77: Carew
- 1977–78: Goodwick United
- 1978–79: Merlins Bridge
- 1979–80: Merlins Bridge

=== 1980s ===
- 1980–81: Johnston
- 1981–82: Johnston
- 1982–83: Johnston
- 1983–84: New Hedges/Saundersfoot
- 1984–85: Carew
- 1985–86: New Hedges/Saundersfoot
- 1986–87: Fishguard Sports
- 1987–88: Merlins Bridge
- 1988–89: Merlins Bridge
- 1989–90: Fishguard Sports

=== 1990s ===
- 1990–91: Merlins Bridge
- 1991–92: Narberth
- 1992–93: Merlins Bridge
- 1993–94: Goodwick United
- 1994–95: Merlins Bridge
- 1995–96: Merlins Bridge
- 1996–97: Hakin United
- 1997–98: Hakin United
- 1998–99: Hakin United
- 1999–2000: Hakin United

=== 2000s ===
- 2000–01: Hakin United
- 2001–02: Hakin United
- 2002–03: Hakin United
- 2003–04: Monkton Swifts
- 2004–05: Monkton Swifts
- 2005–06: Monkton Swifts
- 2006–07: Monkton Swifts
- 2007–08: Merlins Bridge
- 2008–09: Hakin United
- 2009–10: Merlins Bridge

=== 2010s ===
- 2010–11: Hakin United
- 2011–12: Merlins Bridge
- 2012–13: Hakin United
- 2013–14: Hakin United
- 2014–15: Hakin United
- 2015–16: Goodwick United
- 2016–17: Hakin United
- 2017–18: Hakin United
- 2018–19: Monkton Swifts
- 2019–20: Hakin United

=== 2020s ===
- 2020–21: Season void
- 2021–22: Hakin United
- 2022–23: Goodwick United
- 2023–24: Goodwick United
- 2024–25: Goodwick United
- 2025–26: Hakin United

=== Number of titles by winning clubs (since 1945) ===
- Hakin United – 21 titles
- Fishguard Sports – 11 titles
- Merlins Bridge – 11 tiles
- Goodwick United – 7 titles
- Monkton Swifts – 5 titles
- Narberth – 5 titles
- Carew – 3 titles
- Johnston – 3 titles
- Milford United – 3 titles
- New Hedges/Saundersfoot – 2 titles
- Pembroke Borough – 2 titles
- RAF (Pembroke Dock) – 2 titles
- RA Manorbier – 2 titles
- Haverfordwest County – 1 title
- RNAS Dale – 1 title
- St Clears – 1 title

== Pembrokeshire Senior Cup ==
The league's main cup competition, the Pembrokeshire Senior Cup has been in operation since 1946–47.

== See also ==
- Football in Wales
- List of football clubs in Wales
