= Monkton Swifts F.C. =

Association football club in Wales

Monkton Swifts
- Full name: Monkton Swifts Football Club
- Founded: 1955
- Ground: Monkton Lane
- Manager: Joe Lewis
- League: Pembrokeshire League Division One
- 2024–25: Pembrokeshire League Division One, 3rd of 12

Monkton Swifts are a Welsh football club from Monkton, Pembroke, Pembrokeshire in the southwest of Wales. They spent six seasons in the Welsh Football League from 1994–95 to 1999–2000. The club currently play in the Pembrokeshire League Division One. They have been champions of this league on five occasions, the last of which was in 2018–19.

== History ==
A pre World War Two team existed called Monkton United, records of which exist with the team playing in 1926. On 5 December 1955, a meeting was held in Monkton Church Hall with the aim to form a new football club which it was hoped would be entered in the Pembrokeshire League for the 1956–57 season.

== Honours ==
- Pembrokeshire League Division One - Champions (5): 2003–04; 2004–05; 2005–06; 2006–07; 2018–19
- Pembrokeshire League Division One - Runners-Up (5): 1975–76; 1978–79; 1993–94; 2019–20, 2025–26
- Pembrokeshire League Division Two - Champions (6): 1961–62; 1969–70; 1994–95; 1995–96; 2010–11; 2015–16
- Pembrokeshire League Division Two - Runners-Up (3): 1964–65; 1968–69; 1992–93 (second team)
- Pembrokeshire League Division Three - Champions (2): 1999–2000; 2019–20 (second team)
- Pembrokeshire League Division Three - Runners-Up (2): 1975–76 (second team); 1990–91 (second team)
- Pembrokeshire League Division Five - Champions (1): 1992–93 (third team); 2022–23 (third team)
- Pembrokeshire League Reserves Division One - Champions (2): 2003–04; 2006–07
- Pembrokeshire League Reserves Division One - Runners-Up (2): 2004–05; 2005–06
- Pembrokeshire League Reserves Division Two - Champions (1): 1998–99
- Pembrokeshire Senior Cup - Winners (4): 1976–77; 1980–81; 1992–93; 2006–07
- Pembrokeshire Senior Cup - Runners-Up (6): 1974–75; 2003–04; 2007–08; 2011–12; 2022–23. 2025–26
- Eddie Merry Trophy – Winners: 2006, 2007

== Welsh Football League history ==
Information in this section is sourced from the Football Club History Database and the Welsh Soccer Archive.

Season	Pyramid Tier	League	Final position
1994–95	4	Welsh Football League Division Three	5th
1995–96	4	Welsh Football League Division Three	7th
1996–97	4	Welsh Football League Division Three	5th
1997–98	4	Welsh Football League Division Three	7th
1998–99	4	Welsh Football League Division Three	14th
1999–2000	4	Welsh Football League Division Three	14th (relegated)
