= Hakin United A.F.C. =

Association football club in Wales

Hakin United
- Full name: Hakin United Association Football Club
- Nickname: The Vikings
- Founded: 1908
- Ground: The Observatory Ground
- Capacity: 800+
- Chairman: Tom Wheeler
- Manager: Scott Davies
- League: Pembrokeshire League Division One
- 2024–25: Pembrokeshire League Division One, 2nd of 12

Hakin United are a Welsh football club from Milford Haven, Pembrokeshire in the southwest of Wales. They are currently play in the Pembrokeshire League Division One and are managed by ex–player Scott Davies. They are the league's most successful club, having since the 1945–46 season, won the Division One championship twenty times, and finished as league runners-up thirteen times. The club also holds the record for the number of Pembrokeshire Senior Cups as thirteen time winners. In season 2024-25 they won the coveted West Wales Intermediate Cup for the first time in 21 years and for the fourth time in their history, beating Tenby AFC 3-2 at the Swansea.com making them Pembrokeshire's most successful club in the Intermediate Cup competition.

The current club captain is Ryan Wilson.

In the 2022–23 Welsh Cup they pulled off major surprises when as a tier five club they beat tier two Afan Lido 0–1 in the first round, and followed that up in the second round when they also beat a tier two side Taff's Well 4–1.

== Honours ==
- Pembrokeshire League Division One - Champions (21): 1951–52; 1954–55; 1963–64; 1968–69; 1996–97; 1997–98; 1998–99; 1999–2000; 2000–01; 2001–02; 2002–03; 2008–09; 2010–11; 2012–13; 2013–14; 2014–15; 2016–17; 2017–18; 2019–20; 2021–22; 2025–26
- Pembrokeshire League Division One - Runners-Up (14): 1952–53; 1955–56; 1956–57; 1957–58; 1969–70; 1971–72; 1994–95; 1995–96; 2003–04; 2007–08; 2011–12; 2015–16; 2022–23, 2024–25
- Pembrokeshire League Division Two - Champions (2): 1948–49, 2017–18; 2022–23 (second team)
- Pembrokeshire League Division Two - Runners-Up (1): 1972–73 (second team)
- Pembrokeshire League Division Two Cup - Winners: 2025–26 (reserves)
- Pembrokeshire League Division Three - Champions (1): 2010–11 (second team)
- Pembrokeshire League Division Three - Runners-Up (3): 1981–82 (second team); 1984–85 (second team); 1992–93 (second team)
- Pembrokeshire League Division Four - Champions (1): 1969–70 (second team)
- Pembrokeshire League Reserves Division One - Champions (5): 1995–96; 1997–98; 1998–99; 1999–2000; 2000–01
- Pembrokeshire League Reserves Division One - Runners-Up (4): 1996–97; 2001–02; 2003–04; 2007–08
- Pembrokeshire Senior Cup - Winners (13): 1958–59; 1968–69; 1999–2000; 2000–01; 2001–02; 2002–03; 2005–06; 2008–09; 2010–11; 2011–12; 2017–18; 2021–22, 2024–25
- Pembrokeshire Senior Cup - Runners-Up (3):1964-65; 1998–99; 2016–17
- West Wales Intermediate Cup - Winners (5): 1956–57; 1998–99; 2003–04, 2024–25; 2025–26
- West Wales Intermediate Cup - Finalists: 2000–01; 2022–23
- Joe Lennon Memorial Cup - Winners (9): 2012; 2013; 2014; 2015; 2016; 2017; 2018; 2019; 2021
- West Wales FA Senior Cup - Finalists: 2001–02
- Wiltshire Cup – Winners: 1953–54; 1955–56; 1956–57; 1961–62; 1977–78; 1992–93; 1993–94
