= St Clears A.F.C. =

Association football club in Wales

St Clears
- Full name: St Clears Association Football Club
- Nickname: The Saints
- Founded: 1965
- Ground: Welfare Field
- League: Pembrokeshire League Division Three
- 2024–25: Pembrokeshire League Division Three, 5th of 12

St Clears A.F.C. are a Welsh football club from the town of St Clears, Carmarthenshire in the southwest of Wales. They currently play in the Pembrokeshire League Division Three.

== History ==
The present club was reformed in 1965 and entered the Pembrokeshire League. They won the third division championship in their first season before winning the second division in their second season. They followed this up with a third back-to-back championship in 1967–68 becoming Division One champions for the first, and only time to date.

The club's current badge depicts a boar. It was created by Dan Squire in 2015 to mark the club's 50th anniversary. In 2020 the badge won a "World Cup of Crests" on Twitter, which included over 400 non-league football clubs from around the world. They defeated Leicestershire-based Wirksworth Ivanhoe in the final.

== Honours ==
- Pembrokeshire League Division One - Champions (1) 1967–68
- Pembrokeshire League Division One - Runners-Up (1): 1981–82
- Pembrokeshire League Division Two - Champions (2) 1966–67; 1979–80
- Pembrokeshire League Division Two - Runners-Up (5): 1989–90; 1997–98; 2000–01; 2012–13; 2017–18, 2021–22
- Pembrokeshire League Division Three - Champions (5): 1965–66; 1967–68 (second team); 1987–88; 1995–96; 2011–12
- Pembrokeshire League Division Three - Runners-Up (1): 2008–09
- Pembrokeshire League Division Four - Runners-Up (1): 1978–79 (second team)
- Pembrokeshire League Division Five - Champions (1): 2025–26 (reserves)
- Pembrokeshire League Division Five Cup - Finalists: 2024–25 (reserves)
- Pembrokeshire League Reserves Division Two - Runners-Up (1): 1995–96
- Mond Cup - Winners: 2013–14
