= Fishguard Sports A.F.C. =

Association football club in Wales

Fishguard Sports
- Full name: Fishguard Sports Association Football Club
- Founded: 1947
- Ground: Tregroes Park
- Chairman: John Luke
- League: Pembrokeshire League Division One
- 2024–25: Pembrokeshire League Division Two, 1st of 12 (promoted)

Fishguard Sports are a Welsh football club from Fishguard, Pembrokeshire in the southwest of Wales. They currently play in the Pembrokeshire League Division One They are one of the league's most successful clubs, having since their foundation in 1947, won the Division One championship eleven times.

== Honours ==
- Pembrokeshire League Division One - Champions (11): 1961–62; 1965–66; 1966–67; 1969–70; 1971–72; 1972–73; 1973–74; 1974–75; 1975–76; 1986–87; 1989–90
- Pembrokeshire League Division One - Runners-Up (6): 1958–59; 1964–65; 1967–68; 1970–71; 1976–77; 1990–91
- Pembrokeshire League Division Two - Champions (4): 1950–51; 1968–69 (second team); 2018–19, 2024–25
- Pembrokeshire League Division Two - Runners-Up (5): 1969–70 (second team); 1970–71 (second team); 1975–76 (second team); 1977–78 (second team); 1996–97
- Pembrokeshire League Division Two North - Champions (1): 1956–57 (second team)
- Pembrokeshire League Division Two North - Runners Up (1): 1962–63 (second team)
- Pembrokeshire League Division Three – Champions (1): 2012–13
- Pembrokeshire League Division Three - Runners-Up (2): 1987–88 (second team)
- Pembrokeshire League Division Four – Runners-Up (2): 2011–12; 2017–18 (second team)
- Pembrokeshire League Division Four Cup – Winners: 2024–25 (second team)
- Pembrokeshire Senior Cup – Winners (8): 1964–65; 1965–66; 1966–67; 1967–68; 1971–72; 1972–73; 1974–75; 1988–89
- Pembrokeshire Senior Cup – Finalists (4): 1952–53; 1955–56; 1962–63; 1973–74
- Pembrokeshire League Division Two Cup – Winners: 2024–25
- West Wales Intermediate Challenge Cup – Winners: 1973–74
- West Wales Intermediate Challenge Cup – Finalists (3): 1959–60; 1985–86; 1987–88
