= Penlan A.F.C. =

Association football club in Wales

Penlan AFC
- Full name: Penlan Association Football Club
- Founded: 2006
- Ground: Mynydd Newydd Playing Fields,
- League: West Wales Premier League
- 2024–25: West Wales Premier League, 3rd of 16

Penlan Association Football Club is an amateur Welsh football team based in Penlan, Swansea, Wales. They play in the West Wales Premier League.

== History ==
Formed in 2006, the team have been champions of the top division of the Swansea Senior Football League five times since the 2011–12 season. For the 2020–21 season the club joined the newly formed tier 4 West Wales Premier League. The first season of the competition was cancelled due to the Coronavirus pandemic and in the 2021–22 season the club were the inaugural champions of the league losing only one game all season. Penlan AFC also won the West Wales Premier League Cup, claiming a historic double. Penlan again won the league in the following season.

Penlan have won the WWFA Intermediate Cup three times including becoming the first side from Swansea to win the cup back to back in the 2022–23 and 2023–24 seasons.

In October 2023 it was announced that Penlan would gain control of part of the Mynydd Newydd playing fields, which would enable them to be promoted from the West Wales Premier League.

== Honours ==
- West Wales Premier League – Champions (2): 2021–22; 2022–23
- West Wales Premier League Cup – Winners (1): 2021–22
- Swansea Senior Football League Division One – Champions (5): 2011–12; 2013–14; 2014–15; 2015–16; 2018–19
- Swansea Senior Football League Division One – Runners-up (4): 2010–11; 2016–17; 2017–18; 2019–20
- Swansea Senior Football League Division Two – Runners-up (1): 2006–07
- Swansea Senior Football League Senior Cup – Winners (3): 2016–17; 2017–18; 2018–19
- FAW Trophy – Finalists (1): 2016–17
- West Wales Intermediate Challenge Cup – Winners (3): 2013–14; 2022–23; 2023–24
- West Wales Intermediate Challenge Cup – Finalists (3): 2012–13; 2017–18; 2025–26
