= Pembroke Borough A.F.C. =

Association football club in Wales

Pembroke Borough
- Full name: Pembroke Borough Association Football Club
- Nickname: The Magpies
- Ground: London Road
- League: Pembrokeshire League Division Three
- 2025–26: Pembrokeshire League Division Three, 3rd of 12

Pembroke Borough A.F.C. are a Welsh football club from the town of Pembroke Dock, Pembrokeshire in the southwest of Wales. They are twice champions of the Welsh Football League's top division. The club currently play in the Pembrokeshire League Division Three.

== History ==
The team was formed as a successor to Pembroke Dock Athletic Club.

== Honours ==
- Welsh Football League Division One - Champions (2): 1953–54; 1955–56
- Welsh Football League Division One - Runners-Up (4): 1952–53; 1956–57; 1968–69; 1973–74
- Welsh Football League Division Two West - Champions: 1947–48
- Welsh Football League Division Two West - Runners-Up: 1946–47
- Welsh Football League Cup - Winners (4): 1953–54; 1958–59; 1985–86; 1992–93
- Welsh Football League Cup - Runners-Up (3): 1961–62; 1990–91; 1991–92
- Pembrokeshire League Division One - Champions (2): 1948–49; 1964–65
- Pembrokeshire League Division Two - Runners-up: 1991–92
- Pembrokeshire League Division Three - Champions: 1988–89; 2000–01
- Pembrokeshire League Division Three - Runners-up: 1973–74; 1995–96
- Pembrokeshire League Division Three Cup – Runners-up: 2024–25
- Pembrokeshire Senior Cup – Winners (1): 1948–49
- Pembrokeshire Senior Cup – Runners-Up (2): 1957–58; 1967–68
- West Wales FA Senior Cup – Winners (4): 1971–72; 1972–73; 1977–78; 1980–81
- West Wales FA Senior Cup - Runners-Up (2): 1987–88; 1988–89

== Welsh Football League history ==
Season	Pyramid Tier	League	Final position
1946–47	2	Welsh Football League Division Two West	2nd - Runners-Up
1947–48	2	Welsh Football League Division Two West	1st - Champions (promoted)
1948–49	1	Welsh Football League Division One	10th
1949–50	1	Welsh Football League Division One	3rd
1950–51	1	Welsh Football League Division One	5th
1951–52	1	Welsh Football League Division One	6th
1952–53	1	Welsh Football League Division One	2nd - Runners-Up
1953–54	1	Welsh Football League Division One	1st - Champions
1954–55	1	Welsh Football League Division One	
1955–56	1	Welsh Football League Division One	1st - Champions
1956–57	1	Welsh Football League Division One	2nd - Runners-Up
1957–58	1	Welsh Football League Division One	7th
1958–59	1	Welsh Football League Division One	10th
1959–60	1	Welsh Football League Division One	17th
1960–61	1	Welsh Football League Division One	8th
1961–62	1	Welsh Football League Division One	8th
1962–63	1	Welsh Football League Division One	8th
1963–64	1	Welsh Football League Division One	12th
1964–65 (Note: In this season Division 1 was renamed 'Premier Division', Division 2 East and West were replaced by 'Division 1' and 'Division 2' (effectively Division 2 and Division 3))	1	Welsh Football League Premier Division	9th
1965–66	1	Welsh Football League Premier Division	14th
1966–67	1	Welsh Football League Premier Division	16th
1967–68	1	Welsh Football League Premier Division	7th
1968–69	1	Welsh Football League Premier Division	2nd - Runners-Up
1969–70	1	Welsh Football League Premier Division	11th
1970–71	1	Welsh Football League Premier Division	15th
1971–72	1	Welsh Football League Premier Division	6th
1972–73	1	Welsh Football League Premier Division	4th
1973–74	1	Welsh Football League Premier Division	2nd - Runners-Up
1974–75	1	Welsh Football League Premier Division	9th
1975–76	1	Welsh Football League Premier Division	13th
1976–77	1	Welsh Football League Premier Division	15th
1977–78	1	Welsh Football League Premier Division	6th
1978–79	1	Welsh Football League Premier Division	8th
1979–80	1	Welsh Football League Premier Division	15th
1980–81	1	Welsh Football League Premier Division	16th
1981–82	1	Welsh Football League Premier Division	10th
1982–83	1	Welsh Football League Premier Division	14th
1983–84	1	Welsh Football League National Division	14th
1984–85	1	Welsh Football League National Division	14th
1985–86	1	Welsh Football League National Division	10th
1986–87	1	Welsh Football League National Division	16th
1987–88	1	Welsh Football League National Division	8th
1988–89	1	Welsh Football League National Division	9th
1989–90	1	Welsh Football League National Division	8th
1990–91	1	Welsh Football League National Division	10th
1991–92	1	Welsh Football League National Division	9th
1992–93 (Note: In this season the League of Wales was created as the new national tier 1 league. The Welsh Football League covered South Wales and now existed at tier 2 (Division 1); tier 3 (Division Two) and tier 3 (Division Three).)	2	Welsh Football League Division One	7th
1993–94	2	Welsh Football League Division One	6th
1994–95	2	Welsh Football League Division One	19th

== See also ==
- Category: Pembroke Borough AFC players
