= Carew A.F.C. =

Association football club in Wales

Carew
- Full name: Carew Association Football Club
- Nickname: The Rooks
- League: Pembrokeshire League Division One
- 2024–25: Pembrokeshire League Division One, 9th of 12

Carew A.F.C. are a Welsh football club from Carew, Pembrokeshire in the southwest of Wales. They currently play in the Pembrokeshire League Division One.

== History ==
The club joined the Pembrokeshire League as a division two side for the 1948–49 season, finishing fourth in their first season, moving to the first division at the end of that season. The club's most successful period was in the late 1960s to mid 1970s when the team twice won the Division One championship and were four times runners-up. A third championship was added in 1984–85.

== Honours ==
- Pembrokeshire League Division One - Champions (3) 1970–71; 1976–77; 1984–85
- Pembrokeshire League Division One - Runners-Up (6): 1968–69; 1972–73; 1973–74; 1974–75; 1986–87; 2006–07
- Pembrokeshire League Division Two - Champions (1) 2014–15
- Pembrokeshire League Division Two South - Champions (1) 1958–59
- Pembrokeshire League Division Three - Champions (1): 1969–70 (second team)
- Pembrokeshire League Division Three - Runners-Up (1): 2021–22 (second team)
- Pembrokeshire League Division Four - Runners-Up (1): 1992–93 (second team)
- Pembrokeshire League Reserves Division One - Runners-Up (1): 2000–01
- Pembrokeshire Senior Cup - Winners (4): 1973–74; 1975–76; 1983–84; 1985–86
- Pembrokeshire Senior Cup - Runners-Up (6): 1968–69; 1971–72; 1972–73; 1993–94; 2004–05, 2018–19
- West Wales Intermediate Challenge Cup – Runners-up: 2018-19
