= Narberth A.F.C. =

Association football club in Wales

Narberth
- Full name: Narberth Association Football Club
- Nickname(s): Bluebirds
- Ground: Jesse Road
- League: Pembrokeshire League Division One
- 2024–25: Pembrokeshire League Division Two, 2nd of 12 (promoted)

Narberth A.F.C. are a Welsh football club from Narberth, Pembrokeshire in the southwest of Wales. They currently play in the Pembrokeshire League Division One.

== History ==
The club's most successful period was in the late 1950s when the club won four championships in a row at the end of the decade.

== Honours ==
- Pembrokeshire League Division One - Champions (5): 1956–57; 1957–58; 1958–59; 1959–60; 1991–92
- Pembrokeshire League Division One - Runners-Up (4): 1951–52; 1962–63; 1982–83; 1997–98
- Pembrokeshire League Division Two - Runners-Up: 2024–25
- Pembrokeshire League Division Three - Runners-Up (1): 1983–84 (second team)
- Pembrokeshire League Reserves Division One – Champions (4): 1994–95; 1996–97; 2001–02; 2002–03
- Pembrokeshire League Reserves Division One – Runners-Up (2): 1997–98; 1999–2000
- Pembrokeshire Senior Cup - Winners (3): 1947–48; 1956–57; 1994-95 1997–98
- Pembrokeshire Senior Cup - Runners-Up (6): 1951–52; 1963–64; 1988–89; 1999–2000; 2001–02; 2005–06
- West Wales Amateur Cup – Winners:: 1957–58
