= South Gower A.F.C. =

Association football club in Wales

Coordinates: 51°33′48.7″N 4°12′58.2″W

South Gower
- Full name: South Gower Football Club
- Founded: 1945
- Ground: South Gower Sports Club; Scurlage
- Manager: Callum Davies
- League: West Wales Premier League
- 2025–26: Ardal SW League, 15th of 16 (relegated)
Home colours	Away colours

South Gower F.C. is a football club based in Scurlage in Wales. The club plays in the West Wales Premier League.

== History ==
During the 2008–09 season South Gower were playing in the Swansea Senior League Division One when it was decided that the club should apply for membership to the Welsh Football League. Towards the end of the season the ground was redeveloped the meet Welsh Football Ground Criteria, following an inspection membership was granted. The club finished second in the division as runners-up to Ragged School. The club took up promotion to the Welsh Football League spending two seasons in the Welsh Football League Division Three finishing 10th from 18 clubs in 2009–10 and 16th from 18 clubs in 2010–11. Following on from this the club returned to the Swansea Senior Football League.

For the 2020–21 season the club joined the newly formed Tier 4 West Wales Premier League. Following 2 seasons in the West Wales Premier league the club finished the 2022–23 season as runners-up, securing promotion to the Ardal SW League.

In the club's debut season in the Ardal South West, they finished the season seventh in the table. The team had a respectable run the FAW Welsh Cup, making it to the last 16 in the country, eventually coming out on the wrong side of a 2-1 defeat to the eventual Ardal NW champions, Flint Mountain.

== Staff and Board members ==
- 1st Team Manager : Callum Davies
- 1st Team Coaches: Adrian Giardelli, Steve Lancy, Gareth Coleman
- Secretary : Nigel Rees
- Treasurer : Paul Lancey
- Chairman: Roland Pritchard

== Current squad ==
Note: Flags indicate national team as defined under FIFA eligibility rules; some limited exceptions apply. Players may hold more than one non-FIFA nationality.

No.	Pos.	Nation	Player
-	GK	WAL	Dion Carroll
-	GK	WAL	Morgan Rees
-	DF	ENG	Jack Dixon
-	DF	WAL	Bruno Morris
-	DF	WAL	Luke Benton
-	DF	WAL	Toby Link-Jones
-	DF	WAL	Emyr Hughes
-	DF	ENG	Dominic Dixon
-	DF	WAL	Jac Barrow
-	DF	WAL	Will James

No.	Pos.	Nation	Player
-	DF	ENG	Daniel Quinn
-	DF	WAL	Matthew Turner
-	MF	JPN	Koki Izumi
-	MF	WAL	Louis Jackson
-	MF	WAL	Isaac Rees
-	MF	WAL	Jonny Rees
-	MF	WAL	Ben Bowler-Edwards
-	MF	WAL	Finn Harris
-	MF	WAL	Leo Maw
-	MF	WAL	Sean Howells

No.	Pos.	Nation	Player
-	MF	WAL	Josh Jones
-	MF	WAL	Kallum Peters
-	FW	WAL	Jack Jones
-	FW	WAL	Owen Evans
-	FW	WAL	Rhydian Hughes
-	FW	WAL	Liam Bennett
-	FW	WAL	Liam Keefe
-	FW	WAL	Charlie Morris
-	FW	WAL	Owen Morris
-	FW	WAL	Bobby Anderson
—	FW	WAL	Sam Smitham (u18)
—	DF	GHA	Harri Koscian

== Honours ==
- West Wales Premier League – Runners-up: 2022–23
- Swansea Senior Football League Division One – Runners-up: 2008–09
- West Wales Premier League Cup – Runners-up: 2022–23
- West Wales Intermediate Cup – Winners: 2008–09
- West Wales Intermediate Cup – Runners-up: 2005–06
