= Morriston Town A.F.C. =

Coordinates: 51°40′21.9″N 3°55′11.7″W

Morriston Town
- Full name: Morriston Town Football Club
- Ground: The Dingle Field, Morriston
- Manager: Sam “The Conk” Nolan
- League: Ardal SW League
- 2025–26: Ardal SW League, 6th of 16
Home colours	Away colours

Morriston Town Football Club is an amateur association football team based in Morriston, Swansea, Wales. The club plays in the Ardal SW League.

== History ==
The club was formed in the 1940s as Midland Athletic and played in the Swansea & District League prior to joining the Welsh Football League in 1951.

During their time in the Welsh League Morriston Town achieved only limited success, rising to the Welsh Premier Division in the early 1990s. However, by the 2007–08 season, the club was again languishing in the lower echelons of the Welsh League, and after finishing bottom and suffering relegation from the third division, Morriston Town left the Welsh League after more than 50 years.

As of 2020–21, Morriston Town compete in the newly formed West Wales Premier League tier 4 of Welsh football.

Morriston Town's home ground, The Dingle Field, was purchased from a local farmer during the time that the club first joined the Welsh Football League. One of the founder members helping to buy the field was a Mr. George Payne who lived in front of the fields. Located in the northern area of Morriston, The Dingle plays host to the club's three senior teams, and various youth sides.

In 1962 a memorable match at the Dingle attracted a capacity crowd in excess of 2,000 for a league game to witness Roy Paul's final game as a player when Morriston Town played Garw Athletic.

Morriston Town have shared local rivalries with fellow Swansea League clubs Morriston Olympic FC and CRC Rangers. In 2019 both rival clubs merged to form CRC Olympic.

== Honours (post-1951) ==
- Welsh Football League Division 1 (level two)
  - Champions: 1990–91
  - Runners-up: 1991–92
- Welsh Football League Division 2 West (level two)
  - Runners-up: 1951–52
- Welsh Football League Division 1 (level three)
  - Third place (promoted): 1987–88
- Welsh Football League Division 2 (level three)
  - Third place (promoted): 1969–70, 1976–77
- Welsh Football League Division 3 (level four)
  - Third place (promoted): 1997–98
- West Wales Senior Cup
  - Runners-up: 1994–95
- West Wales Premier League Cup
  - Winners: 2022–23
