= West Wales Premier League =

Association football league in Wales

- Founded: 2020
- Country: Wales
- Number of clubs: 16
- Level on pyramid: 4
- Promotion to: Ardal Leagues
- Relegation to: Carmarthenshire League; Neath & District League; Pembrokeshire League; Swansea Senior League
- Current champions: Rockspur Fords (2025–26)
- Most championships: Rockspur Fords (3 titles)

The West Wales Premier League (known for sponsorship reasons as The Macron West Wales Premier League) is a football league in Wales, at tier 4 of the Welsh Football Pyramid in South West Wales under the control of the West Wales Football Association. The league consists of teams having their grounds and headquarters West of a line drawn from Briton Ferry, Neath, northwards to Glynneath, and then again northwards to the boundary line of the South Wales Football Association. It offers promotion opportunities to the Ardal Leagues, at tier 3 of the Football Association of Wales pyramid.

Its inaugural season was due run in 2020–21 but was cancelled due to the Coronavirus pandemic. It instead started in August 2021 with 11 clubs instead of the 12 planned for the 2020–21 season as Ystradgynlais were not part of the fixture list.

== League history ==
Plans for the new league have come about through the Football Association of Wales “2020 vision and strategic plan for Welsh football”. This plan has led to a reorganisation of the Welsh football Pyramid.

The West Wales Premier League sits at tier four of the Welsh Football Pyramid, and was initially set to run with 11 member clubs. The league champions and runners-up of the league be eligible for promotion to the Ardal Leagues in South West Wales, should they secure a tier three certificate.

The new league was formed with clubs invited from the Carmarthenshire League, Neath & District League, Pembrokeshire League and Swansea Senior League. Twelve clubs joined the inaugural season of the league, with four each from the leagues in Carmarthenshire, Neath and Swansea. Currently no clubs from Pembrokeshire have joined the league.

For the 2022–23 season, the league received three applications to join the league. Ynystawe Athletic from the Swansea Senior League and Clydach and Bryn Rovers from the Neath & District League. Each of the clubs needed to meet the Tier 4 ground criteria and finish in the top two of their respective leagues to be promoted. The only one that met these criteria, Clydach joined the league for the 2022–23 season, along with West End, who had been relegated from the Ardal Leagues.

== Member clubs for the 2026–27 season ==
- AFC Glais
- CK Swiss Valley
- Cwmamman United
- Garden Village
- Giants Grave
- Llandarcy
- Llangennech
- Penlan
- Pontarddulais Town
- Pontlliw
- Rockspur Fords
- Seaside
- South Gower
- Waunarlwydd Galaxy
- West End
- Ynystawe Athletic

== Notes ==
Locations of teams in the 2025–26 West Wales Premier League

== Premier League Champions ==
=== 2020s ===
- 2020–21: – Season void
- 2021–22: – Penlan Club (1)
- 2022–23: – Penlan Club (2)
- 2023–24: – Rockspur Fords (1)
- 2024–25: – Rockspur Fords (2)
- 2025–26: – Rockspur Fords (3)

== League Cup winners ==
=== 2020s ===
- 2020–21: – Season void
- 2021–22: – Penlan Club (1)
- 2022–23: – Morriston Town (1)
- 2023–24: – Rockspur Fords (1)
- 2024–25: – Rockspur Fords (2)
- 2025–26: – Rockspur Fords (3)
