= Goodwick United A.F.C. =

Association football club in Wales

Goodwick United
- Full name: Goodwick United Association Football Club
- Founded: 1949
- Ground: Phoenix Park
- Chairman: Brian Morris
- Manager: Chris O'Sullivan
- League: Pembrokeshire League Division One
- 2025–26: Pembrokeshire League Division One, 3rd of 12
Home colours	Away colours

Goodwick United are a Welsh football club from Goodwick, Pembrokeshire in the southwest of Wales. They currently play in the Pembrokeshire League Division One.

The club was founded for the 1949–50 season as a merger of Pencw United and Dyffryn West End.

== Honours ==
- Pembrokeshire League
  - Division One - Champions (7): 1950–51; 1977–78; 1993–94; 2015–16; 2022–23; 2023–24; 2024–25
  - Division One - Runners-Up (10): 1953–54; 1984–85; 1992–93; 1998–99; 1999–2000; 2000–01; 2002–03; 2013–14; 2017–18, 2021–22
  - Division Two - Runners-Up (1): 1963–64
  - Division Three – Champions: 2024–25 (second team)
  - Division Three - Runners-Up (1): 2009–10 (second team)
  - Division Four – Champions (1): 2008–09 (second team)
  - Division Four – Runners-Up (1): 1970–71 (second team)
  - Reserves Division One – Runners-Up (1): 1994–95
- Pembrokeshire Senior Cup
  - Winners (9): 1951–52; 1954–55; 1987–88; 1998–99; 2009–10; 2014–15; 2015–16; 2022–23, 2025–26
  - Finalists (6): 1980–81; 1983–84; 1986–87; 1995–96; 1996–97; 2023–24
- Pembrokeshire League Jubilee Cup
  - Winners: 2024; 2025
- West Wales Amateur Cup/ Intermediate Challenge Cup
  - Winners: 1949–50; 2015–16;2017–18
- West Wales Intermediate Challenge Cup
  - Finalists: 1999–2000
