= Milford United F.C. =

Milford United
- Full name: Milford United Association Football Club
- Nickname: The Robins
- Founded: 1885
- League: Pembrokeshire League Division Two
- 2024–25: Pembrokeshire League Division One, 11th of 12 (relegated)

Milford United are a Welsh football club from the town of Milford Haven, Pembrokeshire in the southwest of Wales. Formed in 1885, they had a long period playing in the Welsh Football League. The club currently play in the Pembrokeshire League Division Two.

== History ==
The club played in the South Wales League in the 1908–09 season as well as playing in the Pembrokeshire League. They played in the Welsh Football League between the 1930s and 2003, when they resigned from the league. They were runners-up in Division One (then the highest level of the football league system in South Wales) in the 1948–49 season. After dropping out of the Welsh Football League, the club returned to the Pembrokeshire League.

== Honours ==
- Welsh Football League Division One (Tier 1 of the Welsh Football League) - Runners-Up (1): 1948–49
- Welsh Football League Division One (Tier 2 of the Welsh Football League) - Runners-Up (2): 1970–71; 1977–78
- Welsh Football League Division Two (Tier 3 of the Welsh Football Pyramid) - Runners-Up (1): 1999–2000
- Welsh Football League Division Two West (Tier 2 of the Welsh Football League) - Champions (2): 1936–37; 1962–63
- Welsh Football League Division Two (Tier 3 of the Welsh Football League) - Champions (1): 1976–77;
- Welsh Football League Division Three (Tier 4 of the Welsh Football Pyramid) - Champions (1): 1997–98
- Welsh Football League Cup - Winners (1): 1938–39
- Welsh Football League Cup - Runners-Up (5): 1946–57; 1949–50; 1954–55; 1956–57; 1957–58
- Pembrokeshire League Division One - Champions (3): 1947–48; 1949–50; 1962–63
- Pembrokeshire League Division One - Runners-Up (5): 1945–46; 1946–47; 1950–51; 1960–61; 1961–62
- Pembrokeshire League Division Two - Champions (1): 2025–26
- Pembrokeshire Senior Cup – Winners (4): 1959–60; 1960–61; 1961–62; 1962–63
- Pembrokeshire Senior Cup – Runners-Up (4): 1949–50; 1950–51; 1990–91, 2024–25
- Pembrokeshire League Division Two - Champions (6): 1971–72; 1974–75; 1989–90; 1996–97; 1997–98; 2004–05
- Pembrokeshire League Division Two - Runners-Up (3): 2010–11; 2014–15; 2022–23
- Pembrokeshire League Division Three - Runners-Up (1): 1970–71
- Pembrokeshire League Division Five - Runners-Up (1): 1992-95 (second team)
- Pembrokeshire League Reserves Division Two - Champions (2): 1997–98; 2004–05
- West Wales FA Senior Cup – Winners (3): 1937–38; 1978–79; 1985–86
- West Wales FA Senior Cup – Runners-Up (1): 1982–83
- Pembrokeshire League Division Two Cup – Winners: 2008–09

== Welsh Football League history ==
Season	Pyramid Tier	League	Final position
1936–37	2	Welsh Football League Division Two West	1st - Champions (promoted)
1937–38	1	Welsh Football League Division One	13th
1938–39	1	Welsh Football League Division One	3rd
1945–46	1	Welsh Football League Division One	3rd
1946–47	1	Welsh Football League Division One	9th
1947–48	1	Welsh Football League Division One	10th
1948–49	1	Welsh Football League Division One	2nd - Runners-Up
1949–50	1	Welsh Football League Division One	8th
1950–51	1	Welsh Football League Division One	6th
1951–52	1	Welsh Football League Division One	11th
1952–53	1	Welsh Football League Division One	5th
1953–54	1	Welsh Football League Division One	6th
1954–55	1	Welsh Football League Division One	15th
1955–56	1	Welsh Football League Division One	9th
1956–57	1	Welsh Football League Division One	6th
1957–58	1	Welsh Football League Division One	13th
1958–59	1	Welsh Football League Division One	7th
1959–60	1	Welsh Football League Division One	12th
1960–61	1	Welsh Football League Division One	18th
1961–62	1	Welsh Football League Division One	20th (relegated)
1962–63	2	Welsh Football League Division Two West	1st - Champions (promoted)
1963–64	1	Welsh Football League Division One	16th
1964–65	1	Welsh Football League Premier Division	16th (relegated)
1965–66	2	Welsh Football League Division One	11th
1966–67	2	Welsh Football League Division One	11th
1967–68	2	Welsh Football League Division One	14th
1969–70	2	Welsh Football League Division One	9th
1970–71	2	Welsh Football League Division One	2nd - Runners-Up (promoted)
1971–72	1	Welsh Football League Premier Division	18th (relegated)
1972–73	2	Welsh Football League Division One	18th (relegated)
1973–74	3	Welsh Football League Division Two	17th
1974–75	3	Welsh Football League Division Two	8th
1975–76	3	Welsh Football League Division Two	7th
1976–77	3	Welsh Football League Division Two	1st - Champions (promoted)
1977–78	2	Welsh Football League Division One	2nd - Runners-Up (promoted)
1978–79	1	Welsh Football League Premier Division	13th
1978–80	1	Welsh Football League Premier Division	10th
1980–81	1	Welsh Football League Premier Division	5th
1981–82	1	Welsh Football League Premier Division	5th
1982–83	1	Welsh Football League Premier Division	15th
1983–84	1	Welsh Football League National Division	16th
1984–85	1	Welsh Football League National Division	17th
1985–86	1	Welsh Football League National Division	7th
1986–87	1	Welsh Football League National Division	11th
1987–88	1	Welsh Football League National Division	17th
1988–89	1	Welsh Football League National Division	17th (relegated)
1989–90	2	Welsh Football League Premier Division	4th
1990–91	2	Welsh Football League Division One	17th (relegated)
1991–92	3	Welsh Football League Division Two	12th
1992–93 (Note: In this season the League of Wales was created as the new national tier 1 league. The Welsh Football League covered South Wales and now exists at tier 2 (Division One); tier 3 (Division Two) and tier 4 (Division Three).)	4	Welsh Football League Division Three	3rd (promoted)
1993–94	3	Welsh Football League Division Two	14th
1994–95	3	Welsh Football League Division Two	14th (relegated)
1995–96	4	Welsh Football League Division Three	12th
1996–97	4	Welsh Football League Division Three	4th
1997–98	4	Welsh Football League Division Three	1st - Champions (promoted)
1998–99	3	Welsh Football League Division Two	6th
1999–2000	3	Welsh Football League Division Two	2nd - Runners-Up (promoted)
2000–01	2	Welsh Football League Division One	13th
2001–02	2	Welsh Football League Division One	14th
2002–03	2	Welsh Football League Division One	18th (relegated)
2003–04	3	Welsh Football League Division Two	Resigned from the league (record expunged)
