= Swansea Senior Football League =

Swansea Senior Association Football League
- Founded: 1901
- Country: Wales
- Number of clubs: 28
- Level on pyramid: 5–7
- Promotion to: West Wales Premier League
- Current champions: Waunarlwydd Galaxy (2025–26)
- Website: Swansea Senior Football League

The Swansea Senior Association Football League or Swansea Senior League, is a league competition featuring non-professional association football clubs in the area of Swansea, south Wales. The league consists of six divisions, three for "first teams" and others for "reserves" and lower teams. The top division, the Premier Division is just below West Wales Premier League, and therefore sits at level 5 of the Welsh football pyramid.

== History ==
The first football league in the Swansea area was the Swansea Association League, played as early as 1897.

The current league was formed in 1901 as the Swansea Junior League, and launched a Senior League in 1903–04, followed in 1904–05 by a name change to the Swansea & District League. In the 1910–11 season the league had 75 clubs, only two fewer than the Glamorgan Football League. The league was suspended during World War I. During the 1921–22 and 1922–23 seasons, the league expanded to include a Gower Division and a Neath Division.

At the outbreak of World War II in September 1939 all local leagues in Swansea suspended football, but in October both the Swansea & District League and a second league, the Swansea Gwalia League approved a merger for the duration of the war years as the Swansea Gwalia Combination with the league operating two senior divisions. In May 1946 the leagues agreed a permanent merger, with the league to be known as the Swansea District Gwalia League. In 1947–48, the league changed its name to the current league title of the Swansea Senior Association Football League.

== Member clubs for 2026–27 season ==
The following clubs are competing in the Swansea Senior Football League during the 2026–27 season.

=== Premier Division ===
- Blaen-y-Maes
- Clase Social
- Murton Rovers
- Penclawdd
- Plough Colts
- Port Tennant Colts
- Ragged School
- St. Joseph's
- Talycopa
- Treboeth United

=== Division One ===
- Birchgrove Colts
- Brynawel
- Cwm Albion
- FC Bonymaen
- Gors
- Kingsbridge Colts
- Llangyfelach
- Rosehill Community
- St Thomas Stars

=== Division Two ===
- African Community Centre
- Au Swans
- Bonymaen Colts
- Cwmfelin Press
- Maltsters Sports
- Morriston Sports & Social
- Penllergaer
- Sandfields
- Union Rangers

== Champions ==
=== 1900s ===
- 1901–02: – Pontardawe
- 1902–03: – East Side
- 1903–04: –
- 1904–05: –
- 1905–06: –
- 1906–07: – Swansea Town
- 1907–08: – Swansea Town
- 1908–09: – Morriston
- 1909–10: – Mond Nickel Works

=== 1910s ===
- 1910–11: – Swansea United
- 1911–12: –
- 1912–13: – Milford Town
- 1913–14: – Swansea Town
- 1914–15: – No competition due to World War 1
- 1915–16: – No competition due to World War 1
- 1916–17: – No competition due to World War 1
- 1917–18: – No competition due to World War 1
- 1918–19: – No competition due to World War 1
- 1919–20: – Competition not completed

=== 1920s ===
- 1920–21: –
- 1921–22: –
- 1922–23: –
- 1923–24: – Cwm Athletic
- 1924–25: – Cwm Athletic
- 1925–26: – Cwm Athletic
- 1926–27: – Cwm Athletic
- 1927–28: – Aberpergwm
- 1928–29: –
- 1929–30: –

=== 1930s ===
- 1930–31: – Cwm Athletic
- 1931–32: – North End
- 1932–33: –
- 1933–34: –
- 1934–35: – Glynneath Welfare
- 1935–36: –
- 1936–37: –
- 1937–38: –
- 1938–39: –
- 1939–40: –

=== 1940s ===
- 1940–41: – N.O.R. Skewen
- 1941–42: –
- 1942–43: –
- 1943–44: –
- 1944–45: –
- 1945–46: –
- 1946–47: – Cwm Albions
- 1947–48: – Briton Ferry
- 1948–49: – Midland Athletic
- 1949–50: – Stepney

=== 1950s ===
- 1950–51: – Cwm Athletic
- 1951–52: – Cwm Albions
- 1952–53: – Hafod Brotherhood
- 1953–54: – Gors United
- 1954–55: – Fforestfach
- 1955–56: – Dillwyn Amateurs
- 1956–57: – Swansea Dockers
- 1957–58: – Tower United
- 1958–59: – North End
- 1959–60: – North End

=== 1960s ===
- 1960–61: – North End
- 1961–62: – Hillsborough
- 1962–63: – Tower United
- 1963–64: – Swansea Town 'A'
- 1964–65: – North End
- 1965–66: – North End
- 1966–67: – North End
- 1967–68: – St. Joseph's
- 1968–69: – United
- 1969–70: – Swansea Boys Club

=== 1970s ===
- 1970–71: – West End
- 1971–72: – Swansea Boys Club
- 1972–73: – United
- 1973–74: – West End
- 1974–75: – West End
- 1975–76: – Swansea Boys Club
- 1976–77: – West End
- 1977–78: – Ragged School
- 1978–79: – Swansea Boys Club
- 1979–80: – Swansea Boys Club

=== 1980s ===
- 1980–81: – Bonymaen Colts
- 1981–82: – Ragged School
- 1982–83: – West End
- 1983–84: – Ragged School
- 1984–85: – Siliconix
- 1985–86: – West End
- 1986–87: –
- 1987–88: – Port Tennant Colts
- 1988–89: – Blaenymaes
- 1989–90: – Blaenymaes

=== 1990s ===
- 1990–91: –
- 1991–92: –
- 1992–93: –
- 1993–94: –
- 1994–95: – West End
- 1995–96: –
- 1996–97: – West End
- 1997–98: – West End
- 1998–99: – West End
- 1999–2000: – Ragged School

=== 2000s ===
- 2000–01: – Ragged School
- 2001–02: – West End
- 2002–03: – West End
- 2003–04: – Bonymaen Colts
- 2004–05: – West End
- 2005–06: – St. Josephs
- 2006–07: – Winch Wen
- 2007–08: – Ragged School
- 2008–09: – Ragged School
- 2009–10: – Ragged School

=== 2010s ===
- 2010–11: – Swansea Dockers
- 2011–12: – Penlan Club
- 2012–13: – Kilvey United
- 2013–14: – Penlan Club
- 2014–15: – Penlan Club
- 2015–16: – Penlan Club
- 2016–17: – Team Swansea
- 2017–18: – West End Rangers
- 2018–19: – Penlan Club
- 2019–20: – Rockspur Fords

=== 2020s ===
- 2020–21: Season void
- 2021–22: – Rockspur Fords
- 2022–23: – Rockspur Fords (promoted to WWPL)
- 2023–24: – St. Joseph's (promoted to WWPL)
- 2024–25: – Port Tennant Colts
- 2025–26: – Waunarlwydd Galaxy (promoted to WWPL via play-offs)

== Senior Cup winners ==
The first league cup competition was held in 1908–09 with Mond Nickel Works being winners. They were successful in all the pre-World War competitions apart from the 1910–11 season when they were knocked out at the semi-final stage by Swansea United. A partial list of the winners of the Senior Cup competition can be found below.

Ragged School have won the cup 14 times.

- 1908–09: – Mond Nickel Works
- 1909–10: – Mond Nickel Works
- 1911–12: – Mond Nickel Works
- 1912–13: – Mond Nickel Works (replay)
- 1913–14: – Mond Nickel Works
- 1914–15: – No competition due to World War 1
- 1915–16: – No competition due to World War 1
- 1916–17: – No competition due to World War 1
- 1917–18: – No competition due to World War 1
- 1918–19: – No competition due to World War 1
- 1919–20: – Gorseinon
- 1924–25: – Cwm Athletic
- 1925–26: – Cwm Athletic
- 1926–27: – Cwm Athletic
- 1928–29: – Cwm Athletic
- 1929–30: – Cwm Athletic
- 1930–31: – Cwm Athletic
- 1931–32: – North End
- 1936–37: – Alexandra
- 1951–52: – Mumbles Albion
- 1953–54: – Swansea Boys Club
- 1954–55: – Swansea Boys Club
- 1955–56: – Swansea Boys Club
- 1958–59: – North End
- 1963–64: – Swansea Town 'A'
- 1967–68: – United
- 1968–69: – United
- 1969–70: – United
- 1970–71: – West End
- 1971–72: – United
- 1975–76: – Argyle
- 1977–78: – Ragged School
- 1979–80: – Ragged School
- 1980–81: – St. Joseph's
- 1988–89: – Blaenymaes
- 1990–91: – Ragged School
- 1991–92: – Ragged School
- 1992–93: – Ragged School
- 1993–94: – Port Tennant Colts
- 1996–97: – Maltsters Sports
- 2000–01: – Ragged School
- 2005–06: – Brunswick United
- 2008–09: – Cwm Press
- 2009–10: – Swansea Dockers
- 2010–11: – Cwm Press
- 2011–12: – Ragged School
- 2012–13: – Swansea Dockers
- 2013–14: – Ragged School
- 2014–15: – Competition suspended
- 2015–16: – Ynystawe Athletic
- 2016–17: – Penlan Club
- 2017–18: – Penlan Club
- 2018–19: – Penlan Club
- 2019–20: – Competition void - Coronavirus pandemic
- 2020–21: – Competition cancelled - Coronavirus pandemic
- 2021–22: – Rockspur Fords
- 2022–23: – Rockspur Fords
- 2023–24: — St. Joseph's
- 2024–25: — Port Tennant Colts
- 2025–26: — Penclawdd

== Other competition winners ==
=== Open Cup Finals ===
- 1981–82: – St Joseph's 2–1 West End
- 2004–05: – St Joseph's 4–1 Brunswick United
- 2014–15: – Team Swansea
- 2021–22: – Rockspur Fords
- 2022–23: – St Joseph's
- 2023–24: – Plough Colts
- 2024-25 - Penclawdd AFC
- 2025-26 - Penclawdd AFC

=== Gwalia Cup ===
- 2014–15: – Union Rangers
- 2016-17: - Penclawdd AFC
- 2022–23: – CRC Olympic
- 2023-24: - Penclawdd AFC

=== Nursery Cup ===
- 2014–15: – Morriston Olympic

=== Minor Cup ===
- 2004–05: – Gors Inn 4–1 Brunswick United 3rds
- 2007-08: - Penclawdd AFC (2nds)
- 2014–15: – Ynystawe Athletic

=== Charity Shield ===
- 2014–15: – Penlan Club
- 2021–22: – Rockspur Fords
- 2024–25: – Port Tennant Colts

=== Reserve Cup ===
- 2014–15: – Rockspur

== Notable players ==
- Lee Trundle

== Bibliography ==
- Swansea Senior Football League 1901-2001: 100 Years of Local Soccer. Swansea Senior Football League. 2000. ISBN 0-9532038-3-2.
