= 2009–10 Welsh Football League Division Three =

Welsh Football League Division Three
- Season: 2009–10
- Champions: Aberbargoed Buds
- Promoted: Aberbargoed Buds, Abertillery Bluebirds, Cwmaman Institute
- Relegated: Seven Sisters, Troedyrhiw, Llantwit Fardre, Pentwyn Dynamo, Garw
- Goals scored: 1,105
- Average goals/game: 3.61
- Biggest home win: Cwmaman Institute 6–0 Garw; 15 May 2010
- Biggest away win: Garw 1–6 Goytre; 26 September 2009; Garw 1–6 Seven Sisters; 10 October 2009; Pentwyn Dynamo 1–6 Pontyclun; 10 October 2009; South Gower 1–6 Abertillery Bluebirds; 13 February 2010
- Highest scoring: Cwmamman United 5–6 Briton Ferry Llansawel; 19 August 2009; Goytre 7–4 Garw; 23 January 2010; South Gower 7–4 Garw; 13 April 2010

The 2009–10 Welsh Football League Division Three began on 15 August 2009 and ended on 22 May 2010. Aberbargoed Buds won the league by one point.

== Team changes from 2008–09 ==
Abertillery Bluebirds were promoted from the Gwent County League and Corus Steel were promoted from the South Wales Amateur League. Briton Ferry Athletic and Llansawel merged to form Briton Ferry Lansawel. South Gower applied to join the league and were accepted replacing Llansawel.

Ystradgynlais were relegated to the Neath & District League and Merthyr Saints were relegated to the South Wales Amateur League.

AFC Llwydcoed, AFC Porth and Porthcawl Town were promoted to the Welsh Football League Division Two.

Pentwyn Dynamos, Garw and Pontypridd Town were relegated from the Welsh Football League Division Two.

== League table ==
Pos	Team	Pld	W	D	L	GF	GA	GD	Pts
1	Aberbargoed Buds (C, P)	34	21	7	6	74	41	+33	70
2	Abertillery Bluebirds (P)	34	22	3	9	81	38	+43	69
3	Cwmaman Institute (P)	34	19	11	4	70	34	+36	68
4	Briton Ferry Llansawel	34	19	7	8	65	48	+17	64
5	Pontypridd Town	34	18	9	7	67	41	+26	63
6	Corus Steel	33	16	8	9	53	42	+11	56
7	Cwmamman United	34	16	8	10	61	55	+6	56
8	Monmouth Town	34	15	6	13	82	71	+11	51
9	Goytre	34	14	6	14	66	69	−3	48
10	South Gower	34	13	8	13	61	63	−2	47
11	Newport Civil Service	34	14	4	16	50	55	−5	46
12	Seven Sisters (R)	34	13	6	15	62	58	+4	45
13	Pontyclun	34	12	5	17	58	62	−4	41
14	Troedyrhiw (R)	34	10	7	17	56	75	−19	37
15	Llantwit Fardre (R)	34	9	9	16	46	60	−14	36
16	Risca United	34	8	7	19	47	65	−18	31
17	Pentwyn Dynamo (R)	34	5	3	26	56	109	−53	18
18	Garw (R)	34	3	4	27	50	119	−69	13

Source: Welsh Football League
Rules for classification: 1) points; 2) goal difference; 3) number of goals scored.
(C) Champions; (P) Promoted; (R) Relegated

== Results ==
Home \ Away	ABB	ATB	BFL	COR	CWI	CWU	GAR	GOA	LLF	MON	NCS	PWD	PYC	PPT	RIS	SVS	SGO	TRO
Aberbargoed Buds		1–1	3–2	2–2	0–2	2–0	5–0	0–2	0–0	2–0	2–1	5–0	1–1	2–2	2–1	2–0	4–1	3–0
Abertillery Bluebirds	3–1		2–3	0–1	0–1	5–3	4–0	0–1	4–2	5–0	3–1	3–0	2–0	0–2	2–0	2–0	3–0	2–1
Briton Ferry Llansawel	1–3	2–1		4–0	1–1	0–0	5–0	1–1	2–1	3–5	2–1	3–2	1–0	3–1	1–1	3–2	2–1	3–0
Corus Steel	1–1	4–1	0–0		2–1	1–2	2–0	2–3	0–1	2–1	4–0	3–0	2–1	2–1	2–1	2–2	1–2	0–0
Cwmaman Institute	0–1	1–1	1–1	1–2		1–0	6–0	2–0	2–2	3–1	1–1	1–1	1–2	2–1	4–3	2–1	1–0	3–0
Cwmamman United	0–2	0–0	5–6	1–0	2–2		3–1	0–0	4–2	3–2	2–1	3–2	2–1	2–0	4–1	3–1	1–0	1–1
Garw	3–5	1–5	2–3	2–3	1–4	1–0		1–6	0–0	2–5	2–5	6–2	3–4	1–1	1–2	1–6	1–4	1–1
Goytre	1–2	0–4	1–0	2–1	2–3	1–3	7–4		4–2	1–2	2–2	2–1	2–2	1–2	4–4	2–1	2–3	2–1
Llantwit Fardre	2–4	0–2	1–0	2–1	1–2	1–1	3–0	0–1		2–2	1–2	2–2	1–1	2–0	0–2	2–1	1–3	1–2
Monmouth Town	1–2	1–5	3–0	2–3	1–1	5–2	5–4	5–2	4–0		4–0	4–0	2–1	3–3	2–2	2–3	1–1	3–4
Newport Civil Service	1–2	0–3	1–0	1–2	0–4	2–0	2–1	3–0	3–0	1–0		5–1	1–0	0–2	2–0	1–3	1–1	1–2
Pentwyn Dynamo	2–3	1–3	6–1	4–5	0–3	1–2	2–1	2–5	1–5	3–6	3–2		1–6	1–4	0–1	2–3	2–2	3–1
Pontyclun	2–2	0–1	2–4	1–0	1–3	3–4	3–0	4–1	5–1	1–2	0–3	3–2		0–1	3–1	1–4	2–1	2–0
Pontypridd Town	1–0	4–1	0–2	0–0	1–1	4–3	4–1	2–0	0–0	4–1	2–2	0–4	5–0		5–0	2–1	5–2	1–1
Risca United	0–3	0–1	0–2	0–1	2–3	0–1	2–3	2–0	2–2	1–2	0–1	3–2	1–1	1–1		6–1	0–3	2–1
Seven Sisters	2–1	4–1	0–2	1–1	1–1	2–2	2–1	3–0	0–3	2–1	3–0	4–0	1–2	1–2	1–1		3–0	0–3
South Gower	3–0	1–6	0–0	1–1	1–1	1–1	7–4	4–4	1–2	0–1	3–2	2–1	2–0	0–2	2–1	3–2		2–3
Troedyrhiw	3–6	2–5	1–2	1–0	1–5	3–1	1–1	1–4	2–1	3–3	0–1	7–2	4–3	1–2	2–4	1–1	2–4	

Source: Welsh Football League
Legend: Blue = home team win; Yellow = draw; Red = away team win.
