= List of foreign Cymru Premier players =

This is a list of foreign players in the Cymru Premier, which commenced play in 1992. The following players must meet both of the following two criteria:

Have played at least one Cymru Premier game. Players who were signed by Cymru Premier clubs, but only played in lower league, cup and/or European games, or did not play in any competitive games at all, are not included. Are considered foreign, i.e., outside the United Kingdom determined by the following: A player is considered foreign if his allegiance is not to play for the national teams of England, Scotland, Wales or Northern Ireland.

Details correct as of 9 July 2025

== Albania ==
- Eridion Dida – Cefn Druids – 2022

== Antigua and Barbuda ==
- Nathaniel Jarvis – Barry Town United – 2020–22

== Angola ==
- Raúl Correia – Bala Town 2020–2021, Aberystwyth Town 2021-2022
- Jelson Antonio – Cefn Druids – 2022

== Argentina ==
- Matias Etchegoyen – Aberystwyth Town – 2020

== Australia ==
- Daniel Collins – Bala Town, Rhyl – 2014, 2016–17
- Joe Faux – Cefn Druids 2019–21, Caernarfon Town (loan) 2022–25, Flint Town 2025–
- Kai Calderbank-Park – Connah's Quay Nomads – 2020–22
- Jacob Tarasenko – Bala Town – 2025–26

== Bangladesh ==
- Reasat Islam Khaton – Carmarthen Town, Llanelli Town – 2018, 2018–19

== Barbados ==
- Neil Harvey – Cefn Druids – 2015

== Belgium ==
- Tunde Owolabi - Flint Town United - 2025–

== Brazil ==
- Rodrigo Branco – Bangor City – 2016–18
- Mello – Connah's Quay Nomads – 2021–22

== British Virgin Islands ==
- Jordan Johnson – Airbus UK Broughton – 2012–13, 2014–15

== Burundi ==
- Joel Bembo-Leta – Bangor City, – 2018

== Canada ==
- John Toner – The New Saints, Bala Town – 1999–2009, 2009–10
- Simon Rayner – Barry Town United, Port Talbot Town – 2002–03, 2003–04
- Cody Ruberto – Cefn Druids – 2019–21
- Owen Degelman – Trefelin – 2026–

== Cayman Islands ==
- Jamie Wood – The New Saints – 2003–11
- Anthony Nelson – Llanelli Town – 2018–19

== China ==
- William Xie – Caernarfon Town – 2024–

== Congo (Republic of the Congo) ==
- Brandon Diau – Flint Town, Colwyn Bay – 2022–23, 2023
- Offrande Zanzala – Caernarfon Town – 2026–

== Cote d'Ivoire (Ivory Coast) ==
- Florian Yonsian – Flint Town – 2024–25

== Cyprus ==
- James Demetriou – Bangor City, Barry Town United – 2017–18, 2018

== DR Congo (Democratic Republic of the Congo) ==
- Christian Langos – Bangor City, Rhyl, Aberystwyth Town – 2015–17, 2017–18, 2018

== Egypt ==
- Hussein Mehasseb – Bala Town – 2024–

== Eritrea ==
- Haben Samson – Cardiff Metropolitan University – 2023–24

== Estonia ==
- Kevin Kauber – The New Saints – 2019

== Finland ==
- Esa Aalto – Cardiff Metropolitan University – 2018–19

== France ==
- Kevin Monteiro – Airbus UK Broughton – 2016–17
- Yves Zama – Bangor City – 2018
- Moussa Samassa – Cefn Druids – 2018–19
- Papé Diakhité – Cefn Druids – 2019–20
- Walid Gharbaoui – Airbus UK Broughton – 2019–20
- Louis Malandjou-Kondjo – Bala Town, Caernarfon Town – 2020, 2020–21
- Jean-Louis Akpa Akpro – Flint Town – 2022–24
- Wahib Tahra – Newtown – 2024–2025
- Nelson Digbeu – Bala Town – 2025–26

== Germany ==
- Christoph Azimale – Bangor City, Cefn Druids, Bala Town, Aberystwyth Town – 2016–17, 2020–21, 2022–23, 2024–25
- Jan Märtins – Pontypridd United – 2023–24

== Ghana ==
- Emmanuel Agyemang – Cefn Druids – 2021–22

== Greece ==
- Theodorakis Chrisokhou – Cefn Druids – 2016–17

== Gibraltar ==
- David Artell – Bala Town, Port Talbot Town – 2014–16, 2016

== Guinea ==
- Jacques Kpohomouh – Bangor City – 2016

== Guinea-Bissau ==
- Bruno Fernandes – Cefn Druids – 2014–15
- Pavel Vieira – Bangor City, Aberystwyth Town, Cefn Druids – 2016–17, 2020, 2021
- Yalany Baio – Bangor City, Llandudno, Cefn Druids – 2018, 2019, 2021–22
- Kalilo Djalo-Embalo – Carmarthen Town – 2020
- Edmilson Pedro Vaz – Aberystwyth Town – 2019–20
- Lassana Mendes – Bala Town – 2019–23, 2024–
- Marinho Manga – Penybont – 2026–
- Eduino Vaz – Penybont – 2026–

== Italy ==
- Marco Adaggio – Bangor City – 2007
- Filippo Mosetti Casatetto – Cefn Druids – 2017
- Jonathan Anderson – Caernarfon Town – 2020
- Derrick Amankwah – Cefn Druids – 2021
- Soulayman El Amri – Bala Town, Flint Town United – 2022–2023
- Hannoch Boakye – Newtown – 2022–
- Sam Ussher – Newtown – 2023–

== Iran ==
- Porya Ahmadi – Bangor City, Rhyl, Aberystwyth Town, Newtown – 2015–16, 2016–17, 2018–19, 2019, 2019

== Jamaica ==
- Darren Stephenson – Flint Town United, Connahs Quay Nomads – 2025–26, 2026–

== Japan ==
- Hyuga Tanner – Bala Town – 2017–18

== Kenya ==
- Adam Wilson – The New Saints – 2022–23, 2024–

== Liberia ==
- Alieu Sheriff – Bangor City – 2017–18

== Malta ==
- Udo Nwoko – Neath – 2012
- Luke Tabone – Haverfordwest County – 2023–25

== Montserrat ==
- Jamie Wood – The New Saints
- Dale Lee – Rhyl, Prestatyn Town – 2013–14, 2014
- Desean Martin – Newtown – 2024–

== Netherlands ==
- Alfons Fosu-Mensah – Llandudno – 2017–18

== New Zealand ==
- Greg Draper – The New Saints – 2011–21
- Zac Jones – Haverfordwest County – 2022–2025
- Bailey Gaughan - Cardiff Met - 2026–

== Nigeria ==
- Abiodun Baruwa – Barry Town United – 2003
- Obi Anoruo – Airbus UK Broughton – 2017
- Sergio Uyi – Bangor City – 2017
- Ismail Yakubu – Pen-y-Bont – 2020–21

== Pakistan ==
- Atif Bashir – Haverfordwest County – 2008

== Poland ==
- Bartłomiej Fogler – Port Talbot Town – 2011–12
- Krzysztof Nalborski – Aberystwyth Town – 2011–12, 2013–14
- Adrian Cieślewicz – The New Saints – 2014–
- Arkadiusz Piskorski – Cefn Druids – 2017–2020
- Wojciech Gajda – Haverfordwest County – 2020–22
- Dawid Szczepaniak – Cefn Druids, Flint Town – 2020–21, 2022–
- Jakub Ojrzyński – Caernarfon Town – 2021–22

== Portugal ==
- Namir Queni – Carmarthen Town – 2012–13
- Paulo Mendes – Aberystwyth Town, Caernarfon Town, Connah's Quay Nomads, Bala Town, Caernarfon Town – 2018–20, 2020–21, 2021–23, 2023–24, 2024–
- José Ferreira – Cefn Druids – 2021–22
- Anderson Pinto – Connah's Quay Nomads – 2022–23
- Mamudo Dabo – Airbus UK Broughton – 2022
- Benny Couto – The New Saints – 2023–24
- Nelson Sanca – Briton Ferry Llansawel – 2025

== Republic of Ireland ==
- David Forde – Barry Town United – 2001–02
- Richard Kennedy – Barry Town United, Carmarthen Town – 2001–04, 2005–06
- Vinny Whelan – Caernarfon Town – 2007
- Richie Partridge – The New Saints, Airbus UK Broughton – 2010–11, 2012–13
- Sean Thornton – Aberystwyth Town, Bala Town – 2011–13, 2014
- Declan Walker – Bangor City, Aberystwyth Town, Stalybridge Celtic – 2013–16, 2017–2019
- John Disney – Connah's Quay Nomads 2016, 2018 – 2025, Bala Town – 2016–17, 2018, 2018–25
- Tom Holland – The New Saints – 2017–19, 2020–21
- Andrew Burns – Bala Town – 2018–21
- Kurtis Byrne – The New Saints – 2018–2020
- Dean Ebbe – The New Saints, Bala Town – 2018–21, 2022
- Jordan Carroll – Flint Town – 2022–23
- Ollie Young – Pontypridd United – 2023–24
- Josh Ukek – Bala Town – 2023–24
- Eric Yahaya – Aberystwyth Town – 2023
- Uniss Kargbo – Bala Town – 2024–25
- Issa Carbone – Bala Town – 2025

== Romania ==
- Mihai Leca – The New Saints – 2016

== Saint Kitts and Nevis ==
- Matthew Berkeley – The New Saints – 2009-11
- Theo Wharton – Barry Town United – 2020–

== Saint Lucia ==
- Josh Solomon-Davies – Bala Town – 2023–24
- Bayan Aman – Trefelin – 2026–

== Seychelles ==
- Tyrone Cadeau – Briton Ferry Llansawel – 2026–

== Slovenia ==
- Gregor Zabret – Aberystwyth Town – 2021–22

== Somalia ==
- Abdi Sharif – Aberystwyth Town, Connah's Quay Nomads – 2025, 2025–

== South Africa ==
- Paul Evans – Bala Town – 2009–11

== South Korea ==
- Isaac Lee – Flint Town United – 2024–26

== Spain ==
- Guillem Bauza – Port Talbot Town – 2013–14
- Anderson Cayola – Bangor City – 2017–18
- Carlos Indja – Llanelli Town – 2018–19
- Alhagi Touray Sisay – Aberystwyth Town, Haverfordwest County – 2020, 2021–22
- Nathan Crisan – Briton Ferry Llansawel – 2024
- Sidi Sanogo Fofana – Flint Town – 2024–

== Thailand ==
- Narupon Wild – The New Saints – 2006–08

== The Gambia ==
- Ibou Touray – Rhyl – 2015–16
- Babucar Sauane – Ammanford – 2026–

== Trinidad and Tobago ==
- Vaughn Charles – Bala Town – 2018–19
- James Lester – Llanelli Town, Barry Town United 2024–26, 2026–

== United States ==
- Jay Denny – Newtown – 2017–2020
- Ivan Watkins – Haverfordwest County – 2022
- Matthew Olosunde – The New Saints – 2024–25
- Taner Dogan – Bala Town, Holywell Town – 2026, 2026–

== Uruguay ==
- Juan Torres – Cefn Druids – 2022

== Zimbabwe ==
- Alec Mudimu – Cefn Druids, Caernarfon Town, Flint Town – 2017–2020, 2022, 2023–2025
- Shama Bako – Aberystwyth Town – 2020
- Reward Mwakona – Airbus UK Broughton – 2022–23
- Panashe Makwiramiti – Haverfordwest County – 2025–
