= Oliver Southern =

English footballer (born 2002)

Personal information
- Full name: Oliver Samuel Southern
- Date of birth: 6 January 2002 (age 24)
- Place of birth: Warrington, England
- Position: Defender

Team information
- Current team: Runcorn Linnets

Youth career
- 2018–2020: Crewe Alexandra

Senior career*
Years	Team	Apps	(Gls)
2020–2021	Curzon Ashton	7	(0)
2020–2021	→ Squires Gate (loan)	1	(0)
2021–2023	Bala Town	41	(0)
2023–2024	Hereford	25	(1)
2024–2025	Warrington Town	28	(0)
2025	Warrington Rylands 1906		
2025	Prescot Cables		
2025–2026	Trafford		
2026–	Runcorn Linnets		
- * Club domestic league appearances and goals as of 23:40, 3 August 2026 (UTC)

Oliver Samuel Southern (born 6 January 2002) is an English semi-professional footballer who plays as a defender for Northern Premier League Division One West club Runcorn Linnets.

== Career ==
Southern had spells in the academies of Manchester United, Preston North End, Blackburn Rovers and Rochdale as a youngster, won a scholarship at Crewe Alexandra, before moving to National League North club Curzon Ashton to begin his senior career. While at Curzon Ashton he had a very brief loan spell at North West Counties League Premier Division club Squires Gate.

In February 2021, Southern had a trial with Norwich City, featuring for their U23 side.

On 7 August 2021, Southern signed for Cymru Premier club Bala Town. In May 2022, he extended his contract for a further year. He was part of the starting XI for Bala that won the 2023 Welsh League Cup.

On 15 May 2023, Southern signed for National League North club Hereford on a one-year contract, following his Bala team-mate Lassana Mendes to the club. He made his debut in the opening league fixture of the season. He left Hereford after just one season at the club.

On 17 July 2024, Southern signed for hometown club Warrington Town. He was released by the club after one season. In August 2025, he signed for Northern Premier League Premier Division club Warrington Rylands 1906. The following month, on 16 September, he moved to divisional rivals Prescot Cables, where he would spend two months with the club before dropping down a level to join Northern Premier League Division One West club Trafford. After Trafford's relegation, he remained in the division and joined Runcorn Linnets.

== Career statistics ==
As of end of 2024–25 season

Appearances and goals by club, season and competition
Club	Season	League			National cup (Note: Includes FA Cup, Welsh Cup)		League cup (Note: Includes EFL Cup, Welsh League Cup)		Other		Total	
Club	Season	Division	Apps	Goals	Apps	Goals	Apps	Goals	Apps	Goals	Apps	Goals
Curzon Ashton	2020–21	National League North	7	0	1	0	—		1 (Note: Appearance(s) in FA Trophy)	0	9	0
Squires Gate (loan)	2020–21	NWCFL Premier Division	1	0	—		—		—		1	0
Bala Town	2021–22	Cymru Premier	21	0	5	0	3	0	0	0	29	0
Bala Town	2022–23	Cymru Premier	20	0	4	0	5	0	2 (Note: Appearance(s) in UEFA Europa Conference League)	0	31	0
Bala Town	Total		41	0	9	0	8	0	2	0	60	0
Hereford	2023–24	National League North	25	1	1	0	—		4	0	30	1
Warrington Town	2024–25	National League North	28	0	0	0	—		0	0	28	0
Warrington Rylands 1906	2025–26	NPL Premier Division	0	0	0	0	—		0	0	0	0
Career total			102	1	11	0	8	0	7	0	128	1

== Honours ==
=== Bala Town ===
- Welsh League Cup: 2022–23
