= 2022–23 Welsh League Cup =

Nathaniel MG Cup

Tournament details
- Country: Wales
- Dates: 23 July 2022 – 28 January 2023
- Teams: 46

Final positions
- Champions: Bala Town (1st title)
- Runners-up: Connah's Quay Nomads
- All statistics correct as of 16 June 2022.

The 2022–23 Welsh League Cup (known for sponsorship purposes as The Nathaniel MG Cup) was the 31st season of the Welsh League cup competition, which was established in 1992. The reigning champions were Connah's Quay Nomads.

== Format ==
- 44 clubs in the Cymru Premier, Cymru North and Cymru South leagues entered the season's League Cup.
- Caersws and Denbigh Town were awarded the two wildcard spots for the current season.
- 2 teams from each of the Cymru North and Cymru South received byes into the second round - with those byes decided by being the first two clubs in each section of the competition to be drawn in the first round draw, These clubs joined the 12 clubs of the Cymru Premier plus the winners of the first round ties in the second round.

== First round ==
The draw for the first round was made on 21 June 2022 with matches taking place on the weekend of 23 July. Colwyn Bay and Guilsfield of the Cymru North and Cwmbran Celtic and Ammanford in the Cymru South were drawn as the clubs receiving byes in to the second round

=== Northern ===
23 July 2022	Caersws (3)	1–1 (5–3 p)	Prestatyn Town (2)	Caersws, Wales
14:30 BST	Harris 18'		Atkins 9'	Stadium: Recreation Ground; Referee: Siôn Davies

24 July 2022	Chirk AAA (2)	1–0	Conwy Borough (2)	Chirk, Wales
14:30 BST	Orbell 83'			Stadium: Holyhead Road; Attendance: 170; Referee: Alex Livesey

22 July 2022	Denbigh Town (3)	0–1	Gresford Athletic (2)	Denbigh, Wales
19:30 BST			Deacon 54'	Stadium: Central Park; Referee: James Walker

23 July 2022	Holyhead Hotspur (2)	1–2	Llandudno (2)	Holyhead, Wales
14:30 BST	Gibbs 49'		M. Williams 45'; T. Williams 23'	Stadium: The New Stadium; Referee: Alex Livesey

23 July 2022	Mold Alexandra (2)	2–3	Holywell Town (2)	Mold, Wales
14:30 BST	R. Nash 60'; Watkins 64'		Forbes 33', 66'; Andrews 80'	Stadium: Alyn Park; Attendance: 382; Referee: Iwan Griffith

23 July 2022	Penrhyncoch (2)	0–2	Buckley Town (2)	Penrhyncoch, Wales
14:30 BST			McCormick 42'; M. Moore 80'	Stadium: Cae Baker; Referee: Andy Harms

22 July 2022	Ruthin Town (2)	4–1	Porthmadog (2)	Ruthin, Wales
19:45 BST	Nash 52', 90+3'; Rickett 62'; Sullivan 81'		Perry 40'	Stadium: Memorial Playing Fields; Attendance: 227; Referee: Thomas Owen

=== Southern ===
25 July 2022	Briton Ferry Llansawel (2)	3–2	Afan Lido (2)	Briton Ferry, Wales
19:30 BST	Walters 30', 75'; Goldsworthy 90+3'		Edwards 90+2'; C. Jones 90+3' (pen.)	Stadium: Old Road Welfare Ground; Referee: Richard Harrington

23 July 2022	Goytre United (2)	1–6	Trefelin BGC (2)	Goytre, Wales
14:30 BST	A. Walters 78'		D. Thomas 4', 14'; Piper 9', 85'; Tomlinson 68'; J. Davies 79'	Stadium: Glenhafod Park Stadium; Referee: Teifion Cook

22 July 2022	Llanelli Town (2)	1–1 (0–2 p)	Abergavenny Town (2)	Llanelli, Wales
19:45 BST	Hopkins 37' (pen.)		Tandy 20'	Stadium: Stebonheath Park; Attendance: 202; Referee: George Nemes

23 July 2022	Llantwit Major (2)	0–2	Carmarthen Town (2)	Llantwit Major, Wales
14:30 BST		Report	Daley 53'; Surman 63'	Stadium: Windmill Ground; Referee: Bryn Markham-Jones

23 July 2022	Pontardawe Town (2)	1–2	Llanidloes Town (2)	Pontardawe, Wales
14:30 BST	Reed 63' (pen.)		Reynolds 50'; Bird 67'	Stadium: Parc Ynysderw; Attendance: 75; Referee: Kim Fisher

22 July 2022	Swansea University (2)	3–3 (7–6 p)	Cambrian and Clydach Vale (2)	Swansea, Wales
19:30 BST	Matras 28' (pen.); Morgan 40', 46'	Report	Bull 19'; Prosser 35'; Smith 69'	Stadium: Sketty Lane; Attendance: 112; Referee: Alex McInch

22 July 2022	Taffs Well (2)	4–1	Ynyshir Albions (2)	Taff's Well, Wales
19:30 BST	Cann 25'; James Allen 42', 45+1'; Lyon 55'	Report	Griffiths 45'	Stadium: Rhiw'r Ddar Stadium; Attendance: 253; Referee: Kris Hames

== Second round ==
The draw for the second round took place on 25 July and was conducted by Cardiff City assistant manager Tom Ramasut. The 12 JD Cymru Premier clubs enter the competition at the second round stage and are joined by Barry Town United and Cefn Druids, who were relegated from the top-flight last season. The second round ties took place over the weekend of 6 August.

On 28 July 2022, Llandudno, Abergavenny Town and Briton Ferry Llansawel were removed from the Nathaniel MG Cup for rule breaches.

- Cymru North side Llandudno beat Holyhead 2-1 in the first round, but have been removed after fielding two ineligible players.
- Abergavenny and Briton Ferry have also been removed for rule breaches.
- Afan Lido will advance in place of Briton Ferry, but Abergavenny will not be replaced by Llanelli as they have also been thrown out for a rule breach. Penybont received a bye to the third round.
- Llantwit Major, Mold Alexandra and Prestatyn Town were found proven of breaching the same rule, but those clubs were beaten in the first round.

=== Northern ===
5 August 2022	Cefn Druids (2)	0–1	Buckley Town (2)	Cefn Mawr
19:45 BST			I. Jones 21'	Stadium: The Rock; Attendance: 187; Referee: Alex Livesey

5 August 2022	Holyhead Hotspur (2)	0–1	Caernarfon Town (1)	Holyhead
19:45 BST			I. Cartwright 28'	Stadium: The New Stadium; Attendance: 421; Referee: Nicholas Pratt

6 August 2022	Connah's Quay Nomads (1)	1–1 (5–4 p)	The New Saints (1)	Connah's Quay
14:30 BST	M. Wilde 34'		D. McManus 79'	Stadium: Deeside Stadium; Attendance: 256; Referee: Mark Petch

6 August 2022	Caersws (3)	1–6	Holywell Town (2)	Caersws
14:30 BST	Mitchell 54'		Andrews 54', 84', 88'; Cairns 17'; Forbes 24', 31' (pen.)	Stadium: Recreation Ground; Referee: Huw Jones

6 August 2022	Guilsfield (2)	0–1	Ruthin Town (2)	Guilsfield
14:30 BST			G. Owen 78'	Stadium: Community Centre Ground; Referee: Karl Berry

7 August 2022	Gresford Athletic (2)	2–1	Airbus UK (1)	Gresford
13:30 BST	S. Spridgeon 51', 68'		J. Eyre 63'	Stadium: Clappers Lane; Attendance: 292; Referee: John Jones

7 August 2022	Chirk AAA (2)	1–6	Bala Town (1)	Chirk
14:30 BST	S. Rogers 67'		J. Eyre 63'; D. Edwards 4', 45+2'; L. Mendes 14'; G. Newell 50'; L. Wall 63'; R. White 84'	Stadium: Holyhead Road; Attendance: 230; Referee: Iwan Griffith

9 August 2022	Colwyn Bay (2)	1–1 (5–4 p)	Flint Town United (1)	Old Colwyn
19:45 BST	D. Allshorn 84'		J-L. Akpa-Akpro 90+3'	Stadium: Four Crosses Construction Arena; Attendance: 626; Referee: Aaron Jones

=== Southern ===
5 August 2022	Haverfordwest County (1)	4–2	Barry Town (2)	Haverfordwest
19:45 BST	L. Jenkins 33'; J. Wilson 51', 67'; R. Abbruzzese 59'		J. Graham 34'; M. Djalo 79' (pen.)	Stadium: Bridge Meadow Stadium; Referee: Benjamin Williams

5 August 2022	Afan Lido (2)	5–2	Cwmbran Celtic (2)	Aberavon
19:30 BST	C. Jones 11', 25'; J. Webber 40', 88'; C. Indjai 51'		A. McDowell 17'; L. Iles 75'	Stadium: Marston Stadium; Attendance: 173; Referee: Daniel Richardson

6 August 2022	Aberystwyth Town (1)	2–1	Llanidloes Town (2)	Aberystwyth
14:30 BST	S. Davies 37'; P. Perry 70'		A. Evans 36'	Stadium: Park Avenue; Attendance: 260; Referee: Siôn Davies

6 August 2022	Pontypridd United (1)	2–0	Carmarthen Town (2)	Pontypridd
14:30 BST	O. Jones 6'; L. Twamley 45+1'			Stadium: USW Sports Park; Attendance: 173; Referee: Alex McInch

6 August 2022	Trefelin BGC (2)	0–5	Taffs Well (2)	Port Talbot
14:30 BST			J. Allen 22'; M. Walters 47' (o.g.); D. Lyon 81'; E. Cann 86'; C. Lewis 89'	Stadium: Ynys Park Trefelin; Referee: Ieuan Lewis

6 August 2022	Ammanford (2)	2–1	Swansea University (2)	Ammanford
14:30 BST	M. Jones 45+1'; L. Samuel 65'		J. Roberts 27'	Stadium: Recreation Ground; Attendance: 167; Referee: Thomas Bevan

7 August 2022	Cardiff Metropolitan University (1)	2–1	Newtown (1)	Cyncoed
14:30 BST	E. Evans 73' (pen.); H. Owen 84'		S. Sutton 11'	Stadium: Cyncoed Campus; Attendance: 102; Referee: Ryan Kenny

== Third round ==
The draw for the 2022/23 Nathaniel MG Cup third round took place at 8:15pm on Thursday 11 August and was conducted by Sgorio's Mike Davies. Flint Town United, despite losing in the previous round were reinstated due to a competition rule breach by Colwyn Bay. The third round ties took place on 20 and 21 September.

=== Northern ===
20 September 2022	Connah's Quay Nomads (1)	1–0	Holywell Town (2)	Connah's Quay
19:45 BST	Michael Hayes 59'			Stadium: Deeside Stadium; Attendance: 903; Referee: Siôn Davies

20 September 2022	Caernarfon Town (1)	1–4	Bala Town (1)	Caernarfon
19:45 BST	Ben Wynne 47'		Christopher Venables 21'; Luke Wall 39', 49'; Kieran Smith 83'	Stadium: The Oval; Attendance: 326; Referee: Mark Petch

20 September 2022	Buckley Town (2)	2–2 (7–8 p)	Gresford Athletic (2)	Buckley
19:45 BST	Connor Littler 12'; Jake Roberts 87'		Jacob Barratt 45+2'; Luke Douglas 47' (o.g.)	Stadium: The Globe; Attendance: 238; Referee: Mark James
	Penalties
	Leonard Hamilton (penalty scored); Jake Roberts (penalty scored); Ruben Lima Teixeira (penalty scored); Max Moore (penalty missed); Patrick Hinchcliffe (penalty scored); Daniel Burgess (penalty scored); Luke Douglas (penalty scored); Christopher Roberts (penalty missed); James Mcharrie (penalty missed); Dylan Roberts (penalty scored); Iwan Jones (penalty missed)		(penalty missed) Charlie Mann; (penalty scored) Simon Smith; (penalty scored) Dominic Deacon; (penalty scored) George Macready; (penalty scored) Sam Pickering; (penalty scored) Harvey Ellis; (penalty scored) Joshua Griffiths; (penalty missed) Paul Johnson; (penalty missed) James Smith; (penalty scored) Christopher Hibbert; (penalty scored) Rhys Williams

21 September 2022	Ruthin Town (2)	1–3	Flint Town United (1)	Ruthin
19:45 BST	Sam Jones 83'		Mark Cadwallader 14'; Harley Brindley-Peagram 25'; Tyler Garratt 48'	Stadium: Memorial Playing Fields; Attendance: 232; Referee: Conor Charlton-Fleming

=== Southern ===
20 September 2022	Afan Lido (2)	2–0	Pontypridd United (1)	Aberavon
19:45 BST	Liam Griffiths 51'; Sacha Walters 53'			Stadium: Marston Stadium; Referee: Ryan Kenny

20 September 2022	Penybont (1)	1–2	Ammanford (2)	Bridgend
19:45 BST	Mael Davies 46'		Brett Enoch 28'; Callum Thomas 81'	Stadium: Bryntirion Park; Attendance: 306; Referee: Benjamin Williams

20 September 2022	Taffs Well (2)	1–1 (4–3 p)	Haverfordwest County (1)	Taff's Well
19:45 BST	Ethan Cann 23'		Jack Wilson 63'	Stadium: Rhiw'r Ddar; Attendance: 206; Referee: Richard Harrington
	Penalties
	Riccardo Mackenzie (penalty scored); Jamie Owen (penalty scored); Jan Maertins (penalty scored); Marcus Jones (penalty scored)		(penalty missed) Dylan Rees; (penalty scored) Jordan Davies; (penalty scored) Elliot Scotcher; (penalty scored) Ben Fawcett; (penalty missed) Jack Wilson

20 September 2022	Cardiff Metropolitan University (1)	2–2 (5–3 p)	Aberystwyth Town (1)	Cyncoed
19:45 BST	Matthew Chubb 45+2'; Samuel Jones 77'		Charley Edge 27'; Alexander Darlington 34'	Stadium: Cyncoed Campus; Attendance: 403; Referee: David Morgan
	Penalties
	Harry Owen (penalty scored); Samuel Jones (penalty scored); Lewis Rees (penalty scored); Christopher Craven (penalty scored); Emlyn Lewis (penalty scored)		(penalty missed) Sam Phillips; (penalty scored) Jack Thorn; (penalty scored) Charley Edge; (penalty scored) Niall Flint

== Quarter-finals ==
=== Northern ===
18 October 2022	Connah's Quay Nomads (1)	2–0	Ruthin Town (2)	Deeside
19:45	Anderson Pinto 11', 90+3'	Report		Stadium: Deeside Stadium

18 October 2022	Bala Town (1)	4–0	Gresford Athletic (2)	Bala
19:45	Lassana Mendes 18'; Nathan Peate 28'; Antony Kay 66', 76'	Report		Stadium: Maes Tegid

=== Southern ===
18 October 2022	Taff's Well (2)	2–1	Afan Lido (2)	Taffs Well
19:45	Ethan Cann 41'; Jan Maertins 75'	Report	Ben Keen 90+4'	Stadium: Rhiw'r Ddar

19 October 2022	Ammanford (2)	0–3	Cardiff Metropolitan University (1)	Ammanford
19:30		Report	Samuel Jones 31', 77'; Harry Owen 62'	Stadium: Ammanford Recreation Ground

== Semi-finals ==
26 November 2022	Connah's Quay Nomads (1)	2–0	Taff's Well (2)	Connah's Quay
14:00	Callum Bratley 56'; M. Wilde 89'			Stadium: Deeside Stadium

26 November 2022	Bala Town (1)	2–0	Cardiff Metropolitan University (1)	Bala
14:00	Chris Venables 9'; David Edwards 86'			Stadium: Maes Tegid; Attendance: 172

== Final ==
28 January 2023	Connah's Quay Nomads (1)	0–0 (3–4 p)	Bala Town (1)	Cefn-mawr
12:45				Stadium: The Rock

== Top scorers ==
Rank	Player	Club	Goals
1	(England) Danny Andrews	Holywell Town	4
1	(England) Dave Forbes	Holywell Town	4
3	(Wales) Josh Allen	Taffs Well	3
3	(Wales) Cai Jones	Afan Lido	3
