= Glynneath Town A.F.C. =

Football club based in Wales

Glynneath Town
- Full name: Glynneath Town Association Football Club
- Nickname: The Germans
- Founded: 1910
- League: Neath League Premier Division
- 2024–25: Neath League Premier Division, 3rd of 12
Home colours	Away colours

Glynneath Town A.F.C. (Welsh: Clwb Pêl-Droed Glyn-nedd) is a Welsh football club based in Glynneath, Neath Port Talbot. They currently play in the Neath League Premier Division.

== History ==
The club was founded in 1910 by the Aberpergwm mine, when they first entered the Swansea & District League. They were one of 75 clubs in the league for the 1910–11 season. In the 1919–20 season, as Aberpergwm AFC, they were winners of the Swansea & District League Division Two and the Onllwyn Cup. In 1927–28, this club won Division One of the same league, as well as the West Wales Amateur Cup. In 1932–33, they won the Neath & District League, as well as the League Cup, but were beaten in the Open Challenge Cup final by Cynon & Duffryn Rovers.

By 1934–35, the club was known as Glynneath Welfare AFC, when they again won the Swansea & District League and West Wales Amateur Cup. In 1943 and 1946, they were also finalists in the same cup. By 1953–54, they had moved to the Neath & District League and were Division Two champions. The club then played in the Welsh Football League from 1957 to 1963. In 1976–77, they won Division One were runners-up in the Division One Cup. In 1983–84, they were Division One Cup winners, beating Clydach Sports in the final. They repeated this success in the following season, alongside winning Division One and the League Cup. By this point, the club had become known as Glynneath Town AFC. In the following season, after promotion, they went on to win the Premier Cup against Parc Rangers.

In 1998–99, they lost in the Premier Cup final against Cwm Wanderers. In 2001–02, they won the Division One Cup.

In February 2024, it was reported that the club was facing a review of its licence by Neath Port Talbot County Borough Council, on the grounds of "the prevention of crime and disorder, public safety and the protection of children from harm". The club had faced numerous reports relating to alcohol-related violence, noise nuisance and under-age drinking.

In the 2023–24 season, the club were champions of the Neath & District League.

In the 2025–26 Welsh Cup, they reached the third round, and by that point were the lowest-ranked team remaining in the competition. To reach this stage, they beat Cardiff Corinthians, Margam YC, Tredegar Town, and Garden Village. In the third round, they played at home against Trearddur Bay, but lost 5–2. In that season they went on to win the Neath & District League title again, and completed a treble by winning the league's Open Cup and Premier Division Cup.

== Honours ==
- Neath & District League Premier Division / Division One (level 1) - Champions: 1932–33, 2023–24, 2025–26
- Neath & District League Division One / Division Two (level 2) - Champions: 1953–54, 1976–77, 1984–85
- Swansea & District League Division One - Champions: 1927–28, 1934–35
- Swansea & District League Division Two - Champions: 1919–20
- West Wales Amateur Cup - Winners: 1927–28, 1934–35
- West Wales Amateur Cup - Runners-up: 1942–43, 1945–46
- Neath & District League Cup - Winners: 1932–33, 1984–85
- Neath & District League Open Challenge Cup - Winners: 2025–26
- Neath & District League Open Challenge Cup - Runners-up: 1932–33
- Neath & District League Premier Cup - Winners: 1985–86, 2025–26
- Neath & District League Premier Cup - Runners-up: 1998–99
- Neath & District League Division One Cup - Winners: 1983–84, 1984–85, 2001–02
- Neath & District League Division One Cup - Runners-up: 1976–77
- Onllwyn Cup - Winners: 1919–20
