= 2017–18 Welsh Football League Division One =

Welsh Football League Division One
- Season: 2017–18
- Dates: 11 August 2017 – 19 May 2018
- Champions: Llanelli Town
- Promoted: Llanelli Town
- Matches: 240
- Goals: 876 (3.65 per match)
- All statistics correct as of 21 April 2018.

The 2017–18 Welsh Football League Division One (known as the Nathaniel Cars Welsh Football League Division One for sponsorship reasons) was the 2017–18 season of the top football league in South Wales. Together with its North Wales counterpart, the Cymru Alliance, the 16-team division forms the second tier of the Welsh football league system, one level below the nationwide Welsh Premier League. The season began on 11 August 2017 and concluded in May 2018.

== Teams ==
Locations of the 2017–18 Welsh Football League Division One teams

Barry Town United were champions in the previous season and were promoted to the 2017–18 Welsh Premier League.

The bottom two placed teams from the previous season, Risca United and Caldicot Town, were relegated to the 2017–18 Welsh Football League Division Two; they were replaced by Llanelli Town, Briton Ferry Llansawel and Cwmamman United, the top three teams from Division Two the previous season.

=== Stadia and locations ===
Team	Location	Stadium
Afan Lido	Aberavon	Marston Stadium
Briton Ferry Llansawel	Briton Ferry	Old Road
Caerau (Ely)	Ely	Cwrt-yr-Ala
Cambrian & Clydach Vale	Clydach Vale	King George's New Field
Cwmamman United	Glanamman	Grenig Park
Cwmbran Celtic	Cwmbran	Celtic Park
Goytre	Penperlleni	Plough Road
Goytre United	Goytre	Glenhafod Park Stadium
Haverfordwest County	Haverfordwest	Bridge Meadow Stadium
Llanelli Town	Llanelli	Stebonheath Park
Monmouth Town	Monmouth	Chippenham Sports Ground
Pen-y-Bont	Bridgend	Kymco Stadium
Port Talbot Town	Port Talbot	Victoria Road
Taff's Well	Taff's Well	Rhiw Dda'r
Ton Pentre	Ton Pentre	Ynys Park
Undy Athletic	Undy	The Causeway

== League table ==
Pos	Team	Pld	W	D	L	GF	GA	GD	Pts	Promotion or relegation
1	Llanelli Town (C, P)	30	24	3	3	87	33	+54	75	Promotion to the Welsh Premier League
2	Haverfordwest County	30	19	3	8	65	37	+28	60	
3	Pen-y-Bont (Note: Pen-y-Bont were deducted three points for fielding an ineligible player.)	30	18	6	6	64	37	+27	57	
4	Cambrian & Clydach Vale	30	17	3	10	58	39	+19	54	
5	Afan Lido	30	15	4	11	61	48	+13	49	
6	Goytre	30	15	3	12	51	62	−11	48	
7	Goytre United	30	13	8	9	53	52	+1	47	
8	Cwmbran Celtic	30	14	4	12	67	51	+16	46	
9	Undy Athletic	30	13	5	12	62	60	+2	44	
10	Taff's Well	30	11	5	14	52	48	+4	38	
11	Briton Ferry Llansawel	30	10	7	13	58	64	−6	37	
12	Cwmamman United	30	8	6	16	38	59	−21	30	
13	Port Talbot Town (Note: Port Talbot Town were deducted nine points.)	30	9	11	10	58	53	+5	29	Possible relegation to Welsh League Division Two
14	Monmouth Town	30	7	4	19	44	73	−29	25	Possible relegation to Welsh League Division Two
15	Caerau (Ely)	30	5	3	22	32	78	−46	18	Relegation to Welsh League Division Two
16	Ton Pentre	30	1	7	22	26	82	−56	10	Relegation to Welsh League Division Two

Source: Welsh Football League, Soccerway
Rules for classification: 1) Points; 2) Goal difference; 3) Goals scored; 4) Matches won; 5) Play-off.
(C) Champions; (P) Promoted

== Results ==
Home \ Away	AFA	BFL	CAE	CCV	CWU	CWC	GOA	GOU	HAV	LLA	MON	PYB	PTA	TAF	TON	UND
Afan Lido	—	0–1	3–0	4–1	2–1	5–0	4–0	1–6	1–2	0–4	3–1	1–2	3–3	3–2	4–2	4–1
Briton Ferry Llansawel	2–2	—	4–3	1–2	1–2	4–5	3–1	3–1	0–3	1–4	1–0	3–3	5–2	0–4	3–1	3–3
Caerau (Ely)	0–4	3–2	—	0–1	0–1	0–5	0–1	2–4	1–3	1–2	2–1	1–1	1–8	0–3	0–1	1–2
Cambrian & Clydach Vale	0–2	2–0	2–1	—	2–3	1–0	5–2	1–1	3–0	1–3	4–1	0–1	1–0	4–0	5–1	3–0
Cwmamman United	1–0	1–1	2–5	0–5	—	1–3	1–2	1–2	0–2	1–3	0–2	0–3	2–2	4–2	2–1	2–0
Cwmbran Celtic	1–2	2–1	2–0	1–3	2–2	—	4–1	0–1	2–3	1–3	3–1	3–0	0–3	1–0	1–1	3–2
Goytre	2–1	3–1	4–1	0–2	1–0	0–10	—	0–0	3–2	1–4	4–1	3–0	0–1	3–2	2–1	4–1
Goytre United	3–1	3–1	1–0	0–1	3–0	1–4	1–5	—	1–7	0–5	4–0	1–2	2–1	1–3	4–2	2–2
Haverfordwest County	3–0	2–3	5–0	1–0	2–1	1–1	5–0	2–3	—	3–1	0–0	1–2	2–2	2–1	2–1	2–1
Llanelli Town	1–2	4–1	4–1	4–2	1–0	5–3	2–0	3–3	2–0	—	4–1	1–0	2–2	5–2	3–0	0–1
Monmouth Town	2–3	2–1	2–3	4–0	1–1	1–4	2–0	1–3	3–2	2–2	—	2–4	0–0	1–3	3–0	1–6
Pen-y-Bont	2–0	2–2	2–1	0–2	2–1	3–2	2–2	0–0	3–1	0–4	2–1	—	3–0	3–1	8–0	8–1
Port Talbot Town	1–1	3–5	0–0	2–2	3–3	1–1	2–3	1–1	1–2	1–3	4–2	0–2	—	2–1	2–0	2–3
Taff's Well	2–1	0–0	2–2	4–0	0–1	3–0	3–1	2–2	0–1	1–3	3–0	0–0	0–1	—	2–0	2–4
Ton Pentre	2–2	0–4	0–2	1–1	3–3	0–2	1–3	0–0	0–2	1–3	2–4	0–2	1–5	2–2	—	1–5
Undy Athletic	0–2	2–2	6–1	2–1	3–1	2–1	0–0	2–1	1–2	1–2	4–2	3–2	2–3	1–2	1–1	—

Source: Welsh Football League
Legend: Blue = home team win; Yellow = draw; Red = away team win.
