= Cadeau =

Cadeau, the French word for gift, may refer to:

- Le Cadeau, a 1982 French–Italian film
- Dayana Cadeau (born 1966), a Haitian-born Canadian American professional bodybuilder
- Elliot Cadeau (born 2004), an American-Swedish basketball player
- Lally Cadeau (born 1948), a Canadian actor
- Rival Cadeau (born 1964), a Seychellois boxer
- Michel Cadotte (1764–1837), also rendered Michel Cadeau, a Métis fur trader of Ojibwe and French-Canadian descent
- Tyrone Cadeau (born 2004), Seychelles international footballer

== See also ==
- "Si la vie est cadeau", a song which won the 1983 Eurovision Song Contest
