= Neath & District League =

- Founded: 1931
- Country: Wales
- Number of clubs: 55
- Level on pyramid: 5-9
- Promotion to: West Wales Premier League
- Domestic cup(s): Neath & District League Cup
- Current champions: Glynneath Town (2025–26)
- Website: Official League website

The Neath & District League is a football league in South Wales. The league consists of five divisions, named the Premier Division, Division One, Two, Three, and Four. The Premier Division is a feeder to the West Wales Premier League, and therefore sits at level 5 of the Welsh football league system.

The last team to be promoted from this league was Llandarcy in 2025, who joined the tier four West Wales Premier League.

== Member clubs for 2026–27 season ==
=== Premier Division ===
- Bryncoch
- Clydach Sports
- Coed Darcy
- Cwm Wanderers
- Cwrt Herbert Colts
- Glynneath Town
- Neath Town
- Rhos
- Skewen
- Ynysmeudwy
- Ynysygerwn (reserves)
- Ystradgynlais

=== Division One ===
- Bryn Rovers
- Cilfrew Rovers
- Cimla
- Cwmamman United (reserves)
- Cwm Wanderers (reserves)
- Giants Grave (reserves)
- Glynneath Town ‘B’
- Llandarcy (reserves)
- Resolven
- Seven Sisters Onllwyn (reserves)
- Tonna

=== Division Two ===
- AFC Glais (reserves)
- AFC Pontardawe
- Bryn Rovers (reserves)
- Clydach (reserves)
- Coed Darcy (reserves)
- Cwrt Herbert Colts 'B'
- Godrergraig Athletic
- Longford
- Rhos (seconds)
- Skewen 'B'
- Ystradgynlais (seconds)

=== Division Three ===
- Bryncoch (reserves)
- Cilfrew Rovers 'B'
- Clydach (thirds)
- Coed Darcy (thirds)
- Cwm Wanderers (thirds)
- Glynneath Town 'C'
- Godrergraig Athletic (reserves)
- Ivy Athletic
- Llandarcy (thirds)
- Longford (reserves)
- Resolven (reserves)
- Ynysygerwn (thirds)

=== Division Four ===
- AFC Glais (thirds)
- Bryncoch (thirds)
- Bryn Rovers (thirds) (withdrew)
- Cimla (reserves)
- Clydach Sports (reserves)
- Cwrt Herbert Colts (thirds)
- Giants Grave (thirds)
- Godrergraig Athlteic (thirds)
- Ivy Athletic (seconds) (withdrew)
- Longford (thirds)
- Skewen (thirds)
- Tonna (seconds)
- Ynysmeudwy (seconds)

== Premier Division Champions ==
As sourced from the league's website.

Season	Premier Division
1931-32	Seven Sisters
1932-33	Aberpergwm
1933-34	Onllwyn Welfare
1934-35	Garthmoor
1935-36	Briton Ferry Athletic
1936-37	Melyncourt
1937-38	Melyncourt
1938-39	Cynlais Villa
1939-1943	No competition
1943-44	Onllwyn R.A.O.B.
1944-45	G.K.B. Port Talbot
1945-46	Resolven
1946-47	Cathan Stars
1947-48	Melyn Stars
1948-49	Penrhiwtyn Athletic
1949-50	Garthmoor
1950-51	Skewen
1951-52	Cwm Wanderers
1952-53	Cwm Wanderers
1953-54	Mond Knickel Works
1954-55	Melyncourt Corries
1955-56	Melyncourt Corries
1956-57	Melyncourt Corries
1957-58	Ynysmeudwy Athletic
1958-59	Coedffranc
1959-60	Ynysmeudwy Athletic
1960-61	BP Llandarcy
1961-62	BP Llandarcy
1962-63	Cwm Wanderers
1963-64	Cwm Wanderers
1964-65	BP Llandarcy
1965-66	Cwm Wanderers
1966-67	Cwm Wanderers
1967-68	BP Llandarcy
1968-69	BP Llandarcy
1969-70	BP Llandarcy
1970-71	Cwm Wanderers
1971-72	Cwm Wanderers
1972-73	Cwm Wanderers
1973-74	Cwm Wanderers
1974-75	Cwm Wanderers
1975-76	Briton Ferry Athletic
1976-77	Cwm Wanderers
1977-78	Red Star
1978-79	Red Star
1979-80	Red Star
1980-81	Red Star
1981-82	Red Star
1982-83	Red Star
1983-84	Trebanos
1984-85	Ferry Wanderers
1985-86	Park Rangers
1986-87	Yellow Stars
1987-88	Yellow Stars
1988-89	Yellow Stars
1989-90	Cwm Wanderers
1990-91	Cwm Wanderers
1991-92	Cwmtawe
1992-93	Cwmtawe
1993-94	Clydach Sports
1994-95	Cwm Wanderers
1995-96	Giants Grave
1996-97	Cwmtawe
1997-98	Seven Sisters
1998-99	Cilfrew Rovers
1999-00	Clydach Sports
2000-01	Llansawel
2001-02	Cwmamman United
2002-03	Llansawel
2003-04	AFC Caewern
2004-05	Llansawel
2005-06	Llansawel
2006-07	Onllwyn
2007-08	Giants Grave
2008-09	Onllwyn
2009-10	Giants Grave
2010-11	Giants Grave
2011-12	Ystradgynlais
2012-13	Ystradgynlais
2013-14	Ystradgynlais
2014-15	Giants Grave
2015-16	Giants Grave
2016-17	Cwm Wanderers
2017-18	Giants Grave
2018-19	Bryncoch
2019-20	Seven Sisters (promoted to WWPL)
2020-21	Season cancelled due to Coronavirus pandemic restrictions
2021-22	Neath Town
2022-23	Bryn Rovers (promoted to WWPL)
2023-24	Glynneath Town
2024-25	Llandarcy (promoted to WWPL)
2025-26	Glynneath Town
