= Etchegoyen =

Etchegoyen is a surname. Notable people with the surname include:

- Alain Etchegoyen (1951–2007), French philosopher and novelist
- Anne Etchegoyen (born 1980), Basque French singer and songwriter
- Horacio Etchegoyen (1919–2016), Argentine psychoanalyst
- Matias Etchegoyen (born 1995), Argentine footballer
