= Neath (1922) F.C. =

Former association football club in Wales

Neath
- Full name: Neath Football Club
- Founded: 1922
- Dissolved: 2005
- Ground: Llandarcy Park, Llandarcy, Neath
- 2004–05: Welsh Football League Division One, 16th

Neath Football Club were a Welsh football team based in village of Llandarcy near Neath. Neath Port Talbot, in Wales. The team played in the Welsh Football League. In 2005 the team merged with Skewen Athletic to form Neath Athletic.

== History ==
The club was founded in 1922 as National Oil Refineries F.C. as a works team for the local new oil refinery. The team played in the Gwalia League before becoming a founder member of the Neath League in 1931. They also appeared in the first two West Wales Amateur Cup finals losing on both occasions. They did however triumph in 1951 by beating Plasmarl and again won the trophy four years later. By the late 1940s, NOR were also playing in Welsh League Division 2 (West).

In 1954, National Oil Refineries changed their name to BP Llandarcy F.C. following the British Petroleum Company's acquisition of Llandarcy Oil Refinery. They played their games at Llandarcy Park, Llandarcy, Neath.

In 1958 they left the Welsh League. They rejoined the Neath & District League seeing success as league champions in 1961–62, 1962–63, 1964–65, 1967–68, 1968–69 and 1969–70. They returned to the Welsh Football League for the 1971–72 season. The 1977–78 season saw the club finish in third position in Division Two, gaining promotion to Division One.

In 1995-96 season and again in 1996-97 the club won the West Wales Senior Cup beating Swansea City on both occasions at the Vetch field, Swansea.

At the end of the 1997–98 season the club finished third (missing out on second spot on goal difference) and were promoted to Division One for the 1998–99 season. The club changed its name in 2000 to Neath. and were Welsh Football League Division One runners-up in 2002–03. The same season, Neath beat Bettws in the final of the Welsh Football League Cup at Ton Pentre.

At the end of the 2004–05 season, the club merged with Skewen Athletic to form Neath Athletic.

== Honours ==
- Welsh Football League Division One – Champions: 1986–87 (Tier 3)
- Welsh Football League Division One – Runners-up: 2002–03 (Tier 2)
- Neath & District League – Champions (6): 1961–62, 1962–63, 1964–65, 1967–68, 1968–69, 1969–70.
- West Wales Amateur Cup – Winners: 1950–51; 1955–56
- West Wales Amateur Cup – Winners: 1923–24; 1924–25
- Swansea Gwalia Combination – Winners: 1940–41
- WWFA Senior Cup - Winners: 1995-96, 1996-97
- Welsh Football League Cup - Runners Up: 1997-98
- Welsh Football League Cup - Winners: 2002-03
