= 2004–05 Stoke City F.C. season =

Stoke City
2004–05 season
- Chairman: Gunnar Gíslason
- Manager: Tony Pulis
- Stadium: Britannia Stadium
- Championship: 12th (61 Points)
- FA Cup: Third Round
- League Cup: First Round
- Top goalscorer: League: Gifton Noel-Williams (13); All: Gifton Noel-Williams (13)
- Highest home attendance: 23,029 vs Ipswich Town (14 September 2004)
- Lowest home attendance: 12,785 vs Cardiff City (5 April 2005)
- Average home league attendance: 16,455
Home colours

The 2004–05 season was Stoke City's 98th season in the Football League and the 38th in the second tier, now re-branded as the Football League Championship.

With supporter expectation now rising there were hopes that Stoke could soon begin to mount a serious attempt to return to the top flight. But after a poor summer in terms of transfer activity those hopes subsided, but soon returned after a good start to the season with Stoke going top of the table in early September. But any hopes of a promotion push soon vanished with some poor performances and most notably a lack of goals being scored. In fact Stoke went on a dull run of 'binary' results, from 23 October 2004 to 22 February 2005 the only score line was that of 0–0, 1–0, 0–1 and 1–1. Supporters began to vent their anger at the lack of entertainment on offer as the side fell into mid-table obscurity and a final finish of 12th the outcome of a forgettable season.

== Season review ==
=== League ===
Prior to the start of the season the Football League went through a re-branding process with the First Division been renamed the Football League Championship. Stoke had a poor summer in the transfer market with only Dave Brammer and Steve Simonsen joining the club before the start of the season. However these worries were forgotten with a fine pre-season victory over Spanish giants Valencia. Stoke began the 2004–05 season very well beating promotion favourites Wolverhampton Wanderers 2–1 on the opening day. Victories over Gillingham, Cardiff City and Derby County followed and after a thrilling win over Ipswich Town Stoke went top of the table.

However Stoke then lost their form and went seven matches without a win before beating Millwall 1–0 on Halloween. Prior to that on 22 October Stoke drew 1–1 away at Leicester City a result which sparked a dull run of results. Through until 22 February the only score line was that of 0–0, 1–0, 0–1 and 1–1 which saw manager Tony Pulis come under heavy criticism from supporters form the lack of attacking football and entertainment on offer. New signings again failed to arrive with Michael Duberry from Leeds United and Lewis Buxton from Portsmouth the only mainstays from a series of loans, however both players were defenders. Ade Akinbiyi was sold to Burnley despite there being a lack of goalscoring. The 'binary' run of results finally ended with a 3–2 win over Leicester City which prompted an upturn in results but any hopes of a late push for a play-off place was ended with an awful defeat at home to rock bottom Rotherham United.

=== FA Cup ===
Stoke drew Premier League side Arsenal away in the third round and took the lead through Wayne Thomas. But Stoke could not hold out and Arsenal scored twice to go through 2–1.

=== League Cup ===
Stoke made another poor exit in the first round losing against League One side Oldham Athletic.

== Final league table ==
Pos	Team	Pld	W	D	L	GF	GA	GD	Pts
10	Millwall	46	18	12	16	51	45	+6	66
11	Queens Park Rangers	46	17	11	18	54	58	−4	62
12	Stoke City	46	17	10	19	36	38	−2	61
13	Burnley	46	15	15	16	38	39	−1	60
14	Leeds United	46	14	18	14	49	52	−3	60

Updated to match(es) played on 9 December 2011. Source: Football League Tables
Rules for classification: 1) points; 2) goal difference; 3) number of goals scored.

== Results ==
Stoke's score comes first

=== Legend ===
Win	Draw	Loss

=== Pre-season friendlies ===
Match	Date	Opponent	Venue	Result	Attendance	Scorers
1	11 July 2004	Newcastle Town	A	4–1		Noel-Williams, Clarke, Akinbiyi, Neal
2	13 July 2004	Wrexham	A	1–1	1,821	Noel-Williams 40'
3	17 July 2004	Mansfield Town	A	1–0		Russell 28'
4	22 July 2004	AS Roma	A	0–2		
5	25 July 2004	Levski Sofia	A	1–1		Taggart
6	28 July 2004	Valencia	H	1–0	9,905	Asaba 30'
7	31 July 2004	West Bromwich Albion	H	2–1		Brammer 16', Akinbiyi 32'

=== Football League Championship ===
Match	Date	Opponent	Venue	Result	Attendance	Scorers	Report
1	8 August 2004	Wolverhampton Wanderers	H	2–1	17,066	Russell 50', Clarke 70' (pen)	Report
2	10 August 2004	Sheffield United	A	0–0	19,723		Report
3	14 August 2004	Rotherham United	A	1–1	5,925	Akinbiyi 85'	Report
4	21 August 2004	Gillingham	H	2–0	13,234	Noel-Williams 42', Akinbiyi 72'	Report
5	28 August 2004	Cardiff City	A	1–0	12,929	Noel-Williams 37'	Report
6	30 August 2004	Derby County	H	1–0	18,673	Hall 90+3'	Report
7	11 September 2004	Preston North End	A	0–3	12,759		Report
8	14 September 2004	Ipswich Town	H	3–2	23,029	Thomas (2) 45', 75', Akinbiyi 85'	Report
9	18 September 2004	Nottingham Forest	H	0–0	21,115		Report
10	25 September 2004	Burnley	A	2–2	12,981	Akinbiyi (2) 34', 50'	Report
11	28 September 2004	Leeds United	A	0–0	25,759		Report
12	2 October 2004	Queens Park Rangers	H	0–1	16,877		Report
13	16 October 2004	Reading	H	0–1	15,574		Report
14	19 October 2004	West Ham United	A	0–2	29,808		Report
15	23 October 2004	Leicester City	A	1–1	22,882	Asaba 37'	Report
16	30 October 2004	Millwall	H	1–0	14,125	Greenacre 86'	Report
17	2 November 2004	Wigan Athletic	H	0–1	15,882		Report
18	6 November 2004	Reading	A	0–1	14,831		Report
19	13 November 2004	Crewe Alexandra	H	1–0	17,640	Noel-Williams 64'	Report
20	20 November 2004	Plymouth Argyle	A	0–0	15,264		Report
21	27 November 2004	Sunderland	H	0–1	16,980		Report
22	4 December 2004	Watford	A	1–0	12,169	Noel-Williams 24'	Report
23	11 December 2004	Coventry City	H	1–0	15,744	Akinbiyi 21'	Report
24	17 December 2004	Brighton & Hove Albion	A	1–0	6,028	Akinbiyi 85'	Report
25	26 December 2004	Preston North End	H	0–0	20,350		Report
26	28 December 2004	Ipswich Town	A	0–1	26,217		Report
27	1 January 2005	Nottingham Forest	A	0–1	22,051		Report
28	3 January 2005	Burnley	H	0–1	15,689		Report
29	14 January 2005	Queens Park Rangers	A	0–1	13,559		Report
30	22 January 2005	Leeds United	H	0–1	18,372		Report
31	5 February 2005	Wigan Athletic	A	1–0	9,938	Noel-Williams 39'	Report
32	19 February 2005	Millwall	A	1–0	11,036	Jones 15'	Report
33	22 February 2005	Leicester City	H	3–2	14,076	Brammer 24', Noel-Williams 34', Taggart 59'	Report
34	26 February 2005	Coventry City	A	0–0	13,871		Report
35	5 March 2005	Brighton & Hove Albion	H	2–0	14,908	Noel-Williams (2) 39', 44' (2 pen)	Report
36	12 March 2005	Sheffield United	H	2–0	17,019	Noel-Williams (2) 57', 59'	Report
37	15 March 2005	Gillingham	A	1–2	7,766	Jones 54'	Report
38	19 March 2005	Wolverhampton Wanderers	A	1–1	28,103	Noel-Williams 41'	Report
39	2 April 2005	Rotherham United	H	1–2	16,552	Noel-Williams 83'	Report
40	5 April 2005	Cardiff City	H	1–3	12,785	Hill 40'	Report
41	9 April 2005	Derby County	A	1–3	27,640	Taggart 7'	Report
42	16 April 2005	Plymouth Argyle	H	2–0	13,017	Jones 28', Russell 41'	Report
43	19 April 2005	West Ham United	H	0–1	14,534		Report
44	23 April 2005	Crewe Alexandra	A	2–0	9,166	Neal 79', Noel-Williams 89'	Report
45	30 April 2005	Watford	H	0–1	15,229		Report
46	8 May 2005	Sunderland	A	0–1	47,350		Report

=== FA Cup ===
Round	Date	Opponent	Venue	Result	Attendance	Scorers	Report
R3	9 January 2005	Arsenal	A	1–2	36,579	Thomas 44'	Report

=== League Cup ===
Round	Date	Opponent	Venue	Result	Attendance	Scorers	Report
R1	24 August 2004	Oldham Athletic	A	1–2	2,861	Asaba 24'	Report

== Squad statistics ==
No.	Pos.	Name	League		FA Cup		League Cup		Total		Discipline	
No.	Pos.	Name	Apps	Goals	Apps	Goals	Apps	Goals	Apps	Goals	Yellow card	Red card
1	GK	(Netherlands) Ed de Goey	17	0	0	0	0	0	17	0	0	0
2	DF	(England) Wayne Thomas	35	2	1	1	1	0	37	3	6	1
3	DF	(Republic of Ireland) Clive Clarke	42	1	1	0	1	0	44	1	7	1
4	MF	(England) John Eustace	2(5)	0	0(1)	0	0	0	2(6)	0	3	0
5	DF	(England) Michael Duberry	25	0	0	0	0	0	25	0	4	1
6	DF	(England) Clint Hill	31(1)	1	0	0	1	0	32(1)	1	7	1
7	FW	(England) Carl Asaba	14(19)	1	0(1)	0	1	0	15(20)	2	4	0
8	MF	(England) Dave Brammer	42(1)	1	0	0(1)	0	0	42(2)	1	8	0
9	FW	(England) Gifton Noel-Williams	41(5)	13	0	0	0(1)	0	41(6)	13	2	1
10	FW	(Nigeria) Ade Akinbiyi	29	7	1	0	0	0	30	7	6	0
11	MF	(Scotland) Kevin Harper	8(1)	0	0	0	0	0	8(1)	0	1	0
14	GK	(England) Ben Foster	0	0	0	0	0	0	0	0	0	0
15	GK	(England) Steve Simonsen	29(2)	0	1	0	1	0	31(2)	0	2	0
16	DF	(England) Marcus Hall	19(1)	1	1	0	1	0	21(1)	1	2	0
17	MF	(England) Darel Russell	45	2	1	0	1	0	47	2	7	0
18	MF	(England) Lewis Neal	10(13)	1	0	0	1	0	11(13)	1	0	0
19	FW	(England) Chris Greenacre	18(14)	1	1	0	1	0	20(14)	1	2	0
20	DF	(Republic of Ireland) Richard Keogh	0	0	0	0	0	0	0	0	0	0
21	MF	(England) John Halls	20(2)	0	1	0	1	0	22(2)	0	5	1
22	MF	(England) Steve Guppy	0(4)	0	0	0	0	0	0(4)	0	0	0
22	DF	(England) Lewis Buxton	14(2)	0	1	0	0	0	15(2)	0	4	0
23	MF	(England) Karl Henry	14(20)	0	0(1)	0	1	0	15(21)	0	3	0
24	DF	(England) Chris Clark	1(2)	0	0	0	0	0	1(2)	0	1	0
25	DF	(Wales) Gareth Owen	0(2)	0	0	0	0	0	0(2)	0	0	0
27	DF	(England) Chris Barker	4	0	0	0	0	0	4	0	0	0
27	FW	(England) Jason Jarrett	2	0	1	0	0	0	3	0	0	0
27	FW	(Trinidad and Tobago) Kenwyne Jones	13	3	0	0	0	0	13	3	1	0
28	DF	(England) Andy Wilkinson	0(1)	0	0	0	0	0	0(1)	0	0	0
29	FW	(England) Michael Ricketts	1(10)	0	0	0	0	0	1(10)	0	2	0
30	FW	(Northern Ireland) Martin Paterson	0(3)	0	0	0	0	0	0(3)	0	0	0
31	FW	(England) Jermaine Palmer	0(1)	0	0	0	0	0	0(1)	0	0	0
32	DF	(Northern Ireland) Gerry Taggart	31	2	1	0	0	0	32	2	10	1
33	MF	(Iceland) Þórður Guðjónsson	0(2)	0	0	0	0	0	0(2)	0	0	0
34	MF	(Iceland) Tryggvi Guðmundsson	0	0	0	0	0	0	0	0	0	0
35	MF	(United States) Jay Denny	0	0	0	0	0	0	0	0	0	0
36	DF	(England) Carl Dickinson	0(1)	0	0	0	0	0	0(1)	0	0	0
