= Chris Clark (footballer, born 1984) =

English footballer

Personal information
- Date of birth: 9 June 1984 (age 42)
- Place of birth: Shoreham-by-Sea, England
- Position: Midfielder

Senior career*
| Years | Team | Apps | (Gls) |
| 2000–2005 | Portsmouth | 0 | (0) |
| 2005 | → Stoke City (loan) | 3 | (0) |
| 2008–2009 | Bognor Regis Town | | |
- * Club domestic league appearances and goals

Chris Clark (born 9 June 1984) is an English former footballer. He played in the Football League for Stoke City.

== Career ==
Clark was born in Shoreham-by-Sea and joined Portsmouth in 2000. He was loaned out to Stoke City in February 2005 and played in three matches during the 2004–05 season before returning to Portsmouth where he was then released. He went on to play non-league football with Bognor Regis Town.

== Career statistics ==
Appearances and goals by club, season and competition
| Club | Season | League | | FA Cup | | League Cup | | Total | |
| Club | Season | Apps | Goals | Apps | Goals | Apps | Goals | Apps | Goals |
|---|---|---|---|---|---|---|---|---|---|
| Stoke City | 2004–05 | 3 | 0 | 0 | 0 | 0 | 0 | 3 | 0 |
| Career total | | 3 | 0 | 0 | 0 | 0 | 0 | 3 | 0 |
