= Ystradgynlais A.F.C. =

Association football club in Wales

- Ground: Recreation Ground, Ynyscedwyn Road, Ystradgynlais
- League: Neath League Premier Division
- 2025–26: Neath League Premier Division, 6th of 12
Home colours	Away colours

Ystradgynlais AFC are a Welsh football club based in Ystradgynlais and are a member of West Wales Football Association. They currently play in the Neath League Premier Division.

== History ==
After a mixed time playing in the Welsh Football League between 2004 and 2009, they then played in the Neath Premier League. During the 2009–10 season they finished a respectable 4th in the league and won the Premier Division Cup defeating Sunnybank 4–2.

During the 2010–11 season they managed to finish a much improved 2nd in the Neath Premier League and also reached the West Wales Cup semi-final at Stebonheath Park but lost 2–1.

In the 2011–12 season they won the Neath Premier League for the first time in their history by only dropping eight points all season. They also won the Premier Division Cup for the third time by coming from behind twice to beat Seven Sisters 4–3.

For the 2020–21 season the club joined the newly formed Tier 4 West Wales Premier League. The planned inaugural season did not take place due to the Coronavirus pandemic and when the league did start in August 2021, the club were no longer part of the league, instead returning to the Neath & District League as a Division Two club. In the season after this, the club entered Division One of the Neath League. In 2023–24, the club won the division and gained promotion to the Premier Division.

== Honours ==
- West Wales Association Intermediate Cup – Runners Up: 2014–15
- Neath Premier League – Champions (3): 2011–12; 2012–13; 2013–14
- Neath Premier League – Runners-up: 2010–11
- Neath Division One – Champions: 2023-24
- Neath Premier Division Cup – Winners: 2003–04, 2009–10, 2011–12
- Neath League Open Cup – Winners: 2011–12, Runners Up: 2001–02
- Swansea Valley Cup – Winners: 2010–11
- Swansea League Intermediate Cup – Winners: 1912–13
