= Skewen Athletic F.C. =

Former association football club in Wales

Skewen Athletic
- Full name: Skewen Athletic Football Club
- Dissolved: 2005
- Ground: Tennant Park
- 2004-05: Welsh Football League Division One, 4th

Skewen Athletic Football Club were a Welsh football team based in Skewen in the county borough of Neath Port Talbot, in Wales. The team played in the Welsh Football League. In 2005 the team merged with Neath to form Neath Athletic.

== History ==
The club's history could be traced back to the 1920s when they played as Garthmoor FC. The team was founded by local builders H. Snow & Co and named after an elevated area between Neath & Briton Ferry. They initially played in the Swansea Gwalia League before moving to the Neath League where in the 1934–35 season they won the Neath & District League Championship and Open Cup.

They reached the and reached the final of the West Wales Amateur Cup in 1938–39 losing to Swansea Nomads.

They joined the Welsh Football League Division Two (West), still named 'Garthmoor' after the war, and moved ground to Cwrt Herbert. This was followed by a change of name to Neath Athletic in the early 1950s (during this period they played teams both in the Welsh Football League and the Neath League using both team names) but it was not until 1967–68 that they finally reached the top division of the Welsh Football League. In order to meet the ground criteria (an enclosed ground was needed) they moved to the Greyhound Stadium in Skewen and changed their name to Skewen Athletic. After a number of seasons they moved to Tennant Park.

The 2002–03 season saw the club finish as Welsh Football League Division Three runners–up on goal difference to Pontyclun. The next season the club finished as Welsh Football League Division Two champions, gaining promotion to Welsh Football League Division One, where they finished fourth in what was to be their only season in the top division.

At the end of the 2004–05 season, the club merged with Neath to form Neath Athletic.

== Honours ==
- Welsh Football League Division Two – Champions: 2004–05
- Welsh Football League Division Two – Runners-up: 1966–67
- Welsh Football League Division Three – Runners–up: 2002–03
- Neath & District League – Champions (3): 1934–35, 1949–50, 1950–51
- Neath Open Cup – Winners: 1934–35
- West Wales Amateur Cup – Runners-up: 1938–39
