= Giants Grave F.C. =

Association football club in Wales

Giants Grave
- Full name: Giants Grave Football Club
- Nickname: The Grave
- Founded: 1963
- Ground: Parc Newydd
- Capacity: 700
- Chairman: Michael Thomas
- Manager: Jonathan Davies
- League: West Wales Premier League
- 2025–26: West Wales Premier League, 3rd of 16

Giants Grave Football Club is an amateur Welsh football team based in Giant's Grave, Briton Ferry, Neath Port Talbot, Wales. They play in the West Wales Premier League.

== History ==
The club was founded in 1963. They played in the Neath & District League where they have won the Premier Division six times: 1995–96, 2007–08, 2009–10, 2010–11, 2014–15, 2015–16 and 2017–18.

In 2020, they joined the newly formed West Wales Premier League at the fourth tier of the Welsh football league system.

== Honours ==
- West Wales Premier League Cup – Runners-up: 2021–22
- Neath & District League
  - Premier Division – Champions (7): 1995–96; 2007–08; 2009–10; 2010–11; 2014–15; 2015–16; 2017–18
  - Division Two – Champions: 1989–90
  - Division Five – Champions: 1989–90
  - Open Cup – Winners: 2008–09; 2009–10
  - Premier Division Cup – Winners: 1994–95; 1995–96; 2001–02, 2007–08, 2008–09
