= Vinny Whelan =

Irish Gaelic footballer

Personal information
- Native name: Uinsean Ó Faoláin (Irish)
- Born: 22 June 1989 (age 37) Dublin, Ireland

Sport
- Sport: Gaelic football
- Position: Goalkeeper
Club
- Years: Club
- Naomh Maur
Inter-county
- Years: County
- 2010: Dublin U21s

Vinny Whelan (born 22 June 1989) is an Irish Gaelic footballer from Dublin. Whelan plays his club football with Naomh Maur and played at under-21 level for the Dublin county team.

Whelan has previously played professional football for Welsh club Wrexham and in the League of Ireland for Shelbourne.

== Football career ==
Whelan began his senior career with Wrexham in 2006.

The teenage keeper never made a first team appearance for the Wrexham and was sent on loan to Welsh Premier League side Caernarfon Town at the start of the 2007–08 season in order to gain first team experience. He made 17 league and cup appearances for Caernarfon Town. Whelan returned to Wrexham in December 2007 but he was unable to break into their first team.

Whelan parted ways with Wrexham at the end of the season before he moved back home in July 2008 to sign for Shelbourne after a successful trial. Following two friendly appearances against Leeds United and Millwall in 2008, Whelan made his Shelbourne competitive debut on 13 April 2009 in a 3-0 League of Ireland Cup victory over Dundalk at Tolka Park. Following the end of the 2009 season Whelan parted company with Shelbourne for whom he made 3 league and cup appearances.

== International football career ==
During his spell at the Racecourse Ground, Whelan was capped for the Republic of Ireland Under-18s. He made his Under 18 international debut during a 0-0 friendly with the Netherlands on 7 February 2007.

== Gaelic football career ==
Following his release by Shelbourne, Whelan concentrated on his Gaelic football career with his local side from Rush, St. Maurs. His impressive displays saw him become the first choice keeper for the Dublin Under-21 football panel. In 2010, Whelan won the Leinster Under-21 football championship and then the All-Ireland Under 21 Football Championship with "the Dubs".

== Honours ==
Dublin

- All-Ireland Under-21 Football Championship (1): 2010
- Leinster Under-21 Football Championship (1): 2010

Naomh Maur

- Dublin Senior B Football Championship (1): 2014
