= Briton Ferry Athletic F.C. =

Former association football club in Wales

Briton Ferry Athletic
- Full name: Briton Ferry Athletic Football Club
- Founded: 1925
- Dissolved: 2009
- Ground: Old Road, Briton Ferry
- Capacity: 2,000
- 2008–09: Welsh Football League Third Division, 11th (of 18)
Home colours	Away colours

Briton Ferry Athletic F.C. was a football club from Briton Ferry in Wales, playing their home games at Old Road. They last played in Welsh League Division Three. They merged with Llansawel to form Briton Ferry Llansawel A.F.C. on 28 April 2009.

== History ==
After being members of the Welsh League since the 1930s, in 1992 the club was one of the founder members of the League of Wales. After getting relegated in 1994, they bounced straight back as Welsh League Champions in 1994–95. They then spent another two years in Wales' top flight before being relegated again. The club dropped through the divisions to the point where in 2008 it was relegated to Division Three.

== Honours ==
- League of Wales
  - Best ever finish Seventeenth in 1992–93 & 1995–96
- Welsh League National Division (Step 1)
  - Runners-up 1991–92
- Welsh League Division 1 (Step 2)
  - Winners 1971–72, 1994–95
- Welsh League Division 2 West (Step 2)
  - Winners 1946–47
- Welsh League Cup
  - Winners 2003–04
- West Wales Senior Cup
  - Winners 2003–04, 2004–05
  - Runners-up 1947–48, 1974–75, 1983–84, 1986–87
- Neath & District League Premier Division
  - Winners 1935–36, 1975–76
  - Runners-up 1972–73, 1973–74, 1983–84
- Neath & District League Division One
  - Winners 1982–83, 1992–93
  - Runners-up 1994–95
- Neath & District League Division Four
  - Runners-up 1985–86
- Neath & District League Cup
  - Winners 1968–69, 1971–72, 1972–73, 1974–75, 1975–76
- Neath & District League Premier Division Cup
  - Runners-up 1935–36, 1971–72, 1973–74
- Neath & District League Division One Cup
  - Runners-up 1963–64
