= Cwm Wanderers A.F.C. =

Association football club in Wales

Cwm Wanderers
- Full name: Cwm Wanderers Association Football Club
- Founded: 1931
- Ground: Parc Afon Twrch
- League: Neath League Premier Division
- 2025–26: Neath League Premier Division, 2nd 12

Cwm Wanderers Association Football Club is an amateur Welsh football team based in Swansea, Wales. They play in the Neath League Premier Division.

== History ==
The club was founded in 1931. They have a long history of success in the Neath & District League, being the most successful club in that league, winning the top flight title sixteen times. The most successful period in the club's history was the 1970s when the club won the league title six times in seven years.

The joined the West Wales Premier League for its inaugural season but were relegated at the end of the 2024–25 season.

== Honours ==
- Neath & District League Premier Division
  - Champions (16): 1951–52; 1952–53; 1962–63; 1963–64; 1965–66; 1966–67; 1970–71; 1971–72; 1972–73; 1973–74; 1974–75; 1976–77; 1989–90; 1990–91; 1994–95; 2016–17
  - Runners-up: 1958–59; 1959–60, 1961–62, 1964–65, 1969–70, 1985–86, 1986–87, 1987–88, 2000–01
- Neath & District League League Cup
  - Winners: 1965–66, 1969–70, 1970–71, 1973–74, 1997–98
  - Runners-up: 1952–53, 1961–62, 1972–73, 2002–03
