= Anderson Pinto =

Portuguese footballer (born 1994)

Personal information
- Full name: Anderson Rene Pinto Nogueira
- Date of birth: February 11, 1994 (age 32)
- Place of birth: Lisbon, Portugal
- Height: 1.82 m (6 ft 0 in)
- Position: Attacking midfielder

Team information
- Current team: Dynamic Herb Cebu
- Number: 8

Youth career
- AFC Wimbledon
- Fulham
- –2011: Tottenham Hotspur

Senior career*
Years	Team	Apps	(Gls)
2011–2012	Wingate & Finchley		
2012–2013	Carshalton Athletic		
2013–2014	Banbury United		
2014	Glacis United	6	(1)
2014–2017	Europa Point	4	(0)
2018	Hendon		
2019–2020	Walton & Hersham		
2020	Royston Town	1	(0)
2020–2021	Cheshunt		
2021	Braintree Town		
2021–2022	Billericay Town	27	(1)
2022–2023	Connah's Quay Nomads	5	(0)
2023	Billericay Town	16	(1)
2023–2024	Braintree Town	5	(0)
2024	Pirin Razlog		
2024	Connah's Quay Nomads		
2024–2025	Loyola	14	(2)
2025–	Dynamic Herb Cebu	11	(3)
- * Club domestic league appearances and goals as of 06:07, April 22, 2026 (UTC)

Anderson Rene Pinto Nogueira (born 11 February 1994) is a Portuguese professional footballer who plays as either an attacking midfielder or central midfielder for Philippines Football League club Dynamic Herb Cebu.

== Career ==
=== Early career ===
Pinto was born in the city of Lisbon, Portugal. However, he played much of his youth football in England, first playing for the youth academies of AFC Wimbledon and Fulham. He also had a spell at the academy of Premier League team Tottenham Hotspur until 2011.

He signed his first professional contract with London-based club Wingate & Finchley in 2012. He had further stints with Carshalton Athletic and Banbury United, before moving abroad in 2014 to play for Gibraltar Premier Division side Glacis United. He then signed with Second Division side Europa Point, helping the club achieve promotion in 2016.

=== Career in England and Wales ===
After staying in Gibraltar with Pick Up Academy, Pinto next returned to England to sign with Hendon. After a move to play professionally in Portugal fell through, he spent the next few years around England's lower leagues, first playing with Walton & Hersham. He had a short spell with Royston Town just before the COVID-19 Pandemic, then signed for Cheshunt after trialling at Dulwich Hamlet. In 2021, he signed with National League South side Braintree Town, to date his highest step in the English football pyramid.

Over the next few years Pinto would move between a number of clubs, first leaving Braintree to sign for Billericay Town, where he made 27 appearances. He had a two-year spell at Connah's Quay Nomads in Wales' Cymru Premier, where he scored on his debut against Ruthin Town. He had repeat spells at Billericay Town in 2023, Braintree from 2023 to 2024, and Nomads in late 2024, as well as a short spell at Bulgarian side Pirin Razlog.

=== Philippines ===
Pinto would leave Nomads again in 2024, signing for Philippines Football League side Loyola. He made his debut on the club's second matchday in a win over Mendiola 1991, and scored his first goals in a win over Stallion Laguna. He ended the season with 2 goals in 14 games.

In 2025, Pinto would leave Loyola to sign for the previous season's Finals Series champions Dynamic Herb Cebu, joining the club before a campaign in the ASEAN Club Championship. He made his debut in the playoff round, where Cebu won against Kasuka of Brunei, and to date has scored 3 goals in 11 appearances in the league.
