= Jay Denny =

American soccer player

Personal information
- Full name: Jay Denny
- Date of birth: January 6, 1986 (age 40)
- Place of birth: Santa Monica, California, United States
- Height: 6 ft 0 in (1.83 m)
- Position: Midfielder

Youth career
- 1999–2003: Stoke City

Senior career*
Years	Team	Apps	(Gls)
2003–2005	Stoke City	0	(0)
2005–2006	Shrewsbury Town	14	(0)
2006–2007	Nuneaton Borough	27	(3)
2007	Brackley Town	0	(0)
2007–2009	Halesowen Town	98	(15)
2009	Leamington	8	(0)
2009–2010	Halesowen Town	36	(2)
2010–2012	Hednesford Town	109	(5)
2012	Worcester City	2	(0)
2012–2015	Solihull Moors	105	(4)
2015	Worcester City	8	(1)
2015	AFC Telford United	0	(0)
2015–2017	Halesowen Town	37	(1)
2017–2020	Newtown	26	(0)

International career
- United States U17
- United States U20
- * Club domestic league appearances and goals as of 06:46, 1 May 2018 (UTC)

Jay Denny (born January 6, 1986) is an American soccer player.

A midfielder, Denny began his career with Stoke City but never appeared for the first team. He made 14 appearances in the Football League for Shrewsbury Town. He then moved into non-League football and played for Nuneaton Borough, Brackley Town, Halesowen Town, Leamington, Halesowen Town, Hednesford Town and Worcester City before joining Solihull Moors in 2012.

In international football, Denny played for the United States at under-17 and under-20 level.

== Playing career ==
=== Stoke City ===
Denny was born in Santa Monica, California, of English parents, and has lived in England since 1994. He began his career as a trainee with Stoke City after being spotted playing for Cannock Schools district football team at thirteen years of age. He was awarded an academy scholarship at sixteen and a professional contract at eighteen, scored in the match that secured the reserve league championship in the 2003–04 season, and won the club's Young Player of the Year award. Denny was first selected for Stoke's first team for the visit of West Bromwich Albion in May 2004, but remained an unused substitute. He signed a new contract at the end of that season, and appeared on Stoke's bench on eight occasions, but without getting any time on the pitch, and was allowed to leave the club at the end of the 2004–05 season.

=== Shrewsbury Town ===
In the 2005 close season, Denny joined League Two side Shrewsbury Town on a free transfer with a sell-on clause.

Denny started for Shrewsbury on the opening day of the 2005–06 season, in a 1–0 defeat at home to Rochdale. He made seventeen appearances for Shrewsbury in all competitions.

Denny scored two goals for Shrewsbury Town in the 3–2 League Cup victory against Brighton & Hove Albion, an 89th-minute equaliser and the winner in extra time, sending Shrewsbury into the second round of the competition. His contract with the club was terminated by mutual consent in April 2006.

=== Nuneaton Borough ===
Denny then joined Conference North club Nuneaton Borough and made his debut in a Birmingham Senior Cup match against Racing Club Warwick in October 2006. Denny spent one season with Nuneaton, for whom he started twenty games and made a further seven appearances, and scored three goals, one winning goal of the season with a strike against Stalybridge Celtic. Denny was offered a contract in the United States with the Richmond Kickers but he eventually decided against the move after making a trip to Virginia. He was released by the club in May 2007 and joined Brackley Town, again joining up with former manager, Roger Ashby.

=== Halesowen Town ===
Although Denny signed for Brackley Town in the 2007 close season, he left that club after a few weeks to sign for Southern League Premier Division side Halesowen Town, then managed by Martin O'Connor. He made 43 appearances for the Yeltz, more than any other player in the 2007–08 season, and scored five goals in all competitions. One was a late equaliser at Kings Lynn, the eventual champions, and another away at Team Bath in a 3–0 league victory. Denny played alongside Darren Caskey in midfield.

Halesowen lost in the promotion play-off final to Team Bath; the winning goal was scored in the final minute of playing time. After Halesowen's semi-final, four days before the final, was abandoned, the League insisted that the final could not be delayed so the match should be replayed two days later. Thus Halesowen had to play the final just 48 hours after winning their semi-final, and their opponents had an additional 48 hours rest and preparation time. The Yeltz suffered major financial problems the following year and just missed out on the playoffs. Denny played 93 games in two seasons at Halesowen, scoring 15 goals.

Denny left Halesowen in the summer of 2009 to join up with Shamrock Rovers on trial, before eventually joining Leamington for a short spell, however, Halesowen Town's off the field problems were now seemingly resolved and manager Matty Clarke persuaded Denny to return to The Grove as club captain. He spent the season at The Grove narrowly missing out on the play-offs before signing for Southern League Premier rivals Hednesford Town.

=== Hednesford Town ===
Manager Bernard McNally signed Denny for Hednesford Town in July 2010 on a 12-month contract, one of a number of new recruits for the 2010–11 campaign. The club won the Southern League Cup, beating Hemel Hempstead Town over two legs, 5–1 on aggregate. The team followed up the cup success by qualifying for the playoffs after finishing the league season in second position behind champions Truro City. This gave the Pitmen home advantage in the semi-final against Leamington, a game they won 3–1 to progress to the playoff final against third-place finishers Salisbury City. However, after a 1–1 draw in the 90 minutes Hednesford regained the lead, but Salisbury equalised late in extra time and won the tie on penalties. Denny finished the season with two goals from 54 appearances in all competitions, one from 42 in the league. Hednesford transferred to the Northern Premier League for the 2011–12 season. Denny renewed his contract for the new season, and captained the side to another playoff campaign, but was sent off in the semi-final as Bradford Park Avenue won 5–0.

=== Worcester City ===
After training with the club during pre-season, Denny joined Worcester City on non-contract terms before the 2012–13 season. In September, having started only one game for Worcester, Denny moved to fellow Conference North team Solihull Moors, for whom he made his debut in an FA Cup second qualifying round match against Westfields.

=== Newtown ===
In June 2017, Denny joined Welsh Premier League side Newtown.

== International career ==
Denny made various appearances for the United States U-17s and U-20s national teams. He captained the U-20 squad on two occasions in a tournament in Ireland (Wales and Northern Ireland). Denny was forced to miss the U-20 squad's final training camp before selection for the CONCACAF final qualifying tournament for the 2005 under-20 World Cup because of professional commitments to Stoke City; this coincided with a change of national coaches prior to the competition and he was not selected for the tournament squad.

== Career statistics ==
Appearances and goals by club, season and competition
Club	Season	League			FA Cup		League Cup		Other		Total	
Club	Season	Division	Apps	Goals	Apps	Goals	Apps	Goals	Apps	Goals	Apps	Goals
Stoke City	2004–05	Championship	0	0	0	0	0	0	0	0	0	0
Shrewsbury Town	2005–06	League Two	14	0	0	0	2	2	1	0	17	2
Career total			14	0	0	0	2	2	1	0	17	2
