= Llansawel F.C. =

Association football club in Wales

Llansawel
- Full name: Llansawel Football Club
- Founded: 1985
- Dissolved: 2009
- Ground: Cwrt Herbert, Neath Abbey Road, Neath
- Chairman: Wyn Evans
- Manager: Barrie Colwill & Paul Vowles
- 2008–09: Welsh Football League Third Division, 16th (of 18)
- Website: llansawelfc.co.uk
Home colours	Away colours

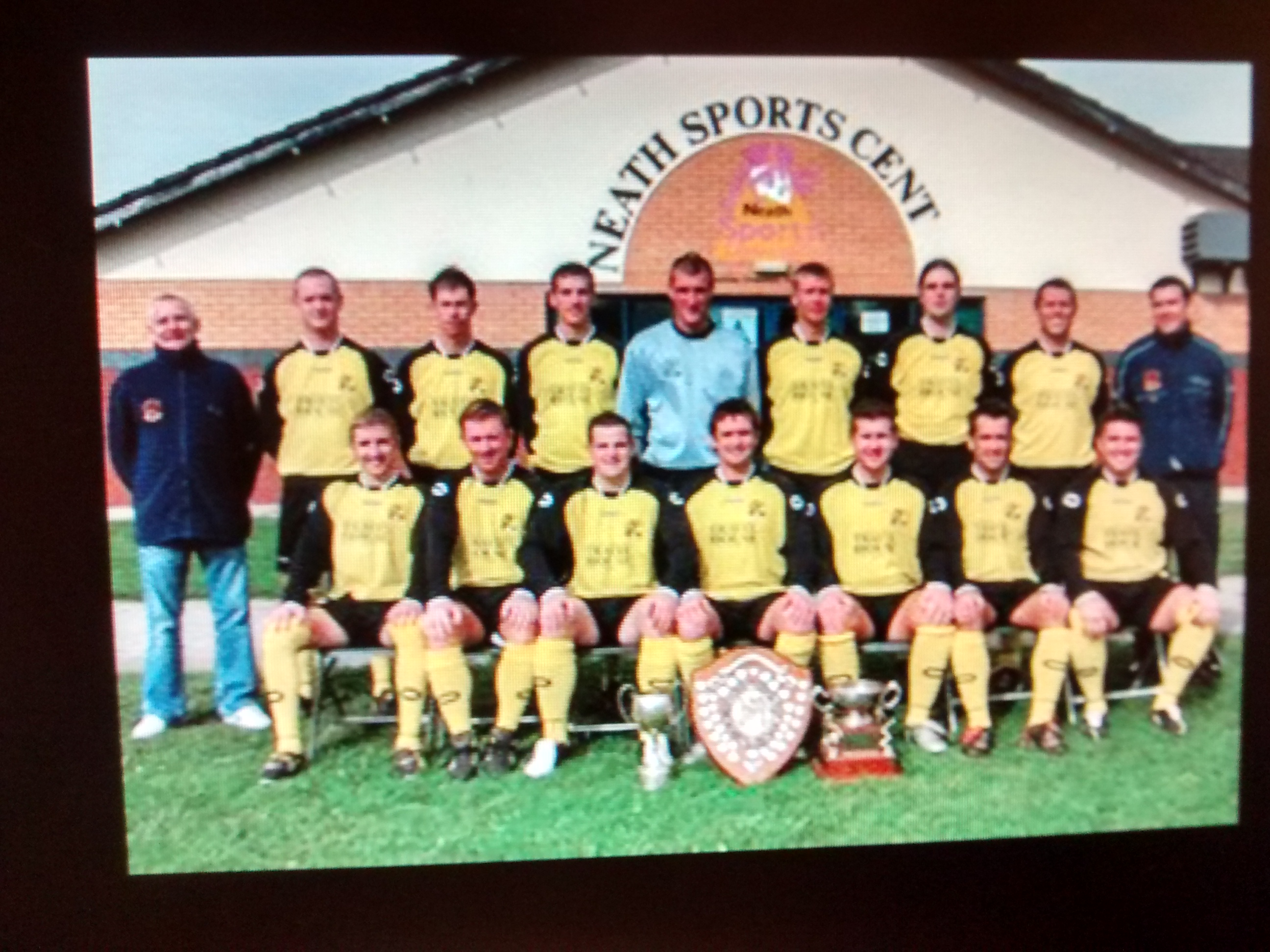
Llansawel F.C. squad 2006–2007

Llansawel F.C. was a Welsh football club that merged with Briton Ferry Athletic to form Briton Ferry Llansawel A.F.C.

== Introduction ==
Llansawel Football Club's home pitch was based at Neath Sports Centre and is the main centre pitch, situated next to the pitch is a covered 150 capacity stand. The club was formed in 1985.

== Honours ==
- Neath League Division 4 Winners – once
- 1992/1993
- Neath League Division 1 Winners – once
- 1998/1999
- Neath League Premier Division Winners – 4 times
- 2000/2001, 2002/2003, 2004/2005, 2005/2006
- Neath League Premier Division Cup Winners – 4 times
- 2000/2001, 2002/2003, 2004/2005, 2005/2006
- Neath League Open Cup Winners – 3 times
- 2002/2003, 2003/2004, 2005/2006
- Neath League Rose Bowl Winners – twice
- 2004/2005, 2005/2006
- Neath League 75th Anniversary 6-a-side Winners
- 2005/2006
- Borough Cup Winners – once
- 2005/2006
