= Seven Sisters Onllwyn F.C. =

Association football club in Wales

Coordinates: 51°45′42.8″N 3°43′13.2″W

Seven Sisters Onllwyn
- Full name: Seven Sisters Onllwyn Football Club
- Founded: 1910 / 1988 (2020 merger)
- Ground: Welfare Ground, Seven Sisters
- Capacity: 500
- Chairman: Leighton Williams
- League: Ardal SW League
- 2025–26: Ardal SW League, 14th of 16
Home colours	Away colours

Seven Sisters Onllwyn F.C. is a Welsh football team based in Seven Sisters, Neath Port Talbot, currently playing in the Ardal SW, which is at the third tier of the Welsh football pyramid. The club was founded in 2020 as a merger of Seven Sisters A.F.C. with nearby Onllwyn A.F.C.

== History ==
=== Seven Sisters ===
Football was first played in Seven Sisters in 1910. Seven Sisters A.F.C. was founded in the early 1920s. This club played for 4 years before a new "Stars" club was formed, then in 1929 the "Black and Tans" were formed. In their second season, the "Black and Tans" won all but one game, winning the John Hando Cup. In 1932 Seven Sisters won the Neath & District League. After World War II they played in the Welsh Football League where they stayed until 1997. After a season out of the league they rejoined for the 1998–99 season in Division Three, and were promoted to Division Two for 2004–05, but lasted just one season there, and left the league at the end of the 2009–10 season. The club then rejoined the Neath & District League.

In the abandoned 2019–20 season, the club were champions of the Neath & District League by points per game. For the following season the club joined the newly formed Tier 4 West Wales Premier League.

=== Onllwyn ===
A club named Onllwyn Welfare won the Neath & District League in 1934, and joined the Welsh Football League after World War II. They had left the league by 1949.

Onllwyn A.F.C. was founded in 1988 and played in the Neath & District League throughout their entire existence. This club won the league title in 2006–07 and 2008–09. In the season before the merger, they withdrew from Division Two after just 2 games, drawing 1 and losing 1.

=== Merger ===
On 13 July 2020, Seven Sisters announced a merger with Onllwyn, forming a new club, Seven Sisters Onllwyn. The first team would play in the West Wales Premier League along with two teams in the Neath & District League.

On 9 June 2022, the it was announced that the club had been promoted to the tier 3 Ardal SW League for the 2022–23 season via the vacancy route.

== Honours ==
=== Seven Sisters Onllwyn ===
- West Wales Intermediate Cup - Winners: 2021–22

=== Seven Sisters ===
- Welsh Football League Division Three - Runners-up: 2003–04
- Neath & District League Premier Division - Champions: 1931–32; 1997–98; 2019–20
- John Hando Cup - Winners: 1930–31

=== Onllwyn ===
- Neath & District League Premier Division - Champions: 1933–34 (as Onllwyn Welfare); 2006–07; 2008–09

== Committee members ==
- Secretary : Jeff Bloffwitch
- Fixture Secretary: David Herdman
- Treasurer : Andrew Loynes
- Groundsman: Richard Herdman / Lee Davies
- Committee members:
