= Tyrone Cadeau =

Seychelles footballer

Personal information
- Date of birth: 14 June 2004 (age 22)
- Place of birth: Cimla, Wales
- Position: Midfielder

Team information
- Current team: Briton Ferry Llansawel
- Number: 26

Youth career
- –2021: Pontardawe Town

Senior career*
Years	Team	Apps	(Gls)
2021–2022	Briton Ferry	5	(0)
2022–2023	Port Vale	0	(0)
2023	Matlock Town	4	(0)
2023–2024	Kidsgrove Athletic	30	(1)
2024	Stafford Rangers	6	(2)
2025	Newcastle Town	2	(0)
2025–2026	Hanley Town		
2026–	Briton Ferry Llansawel	4	(0)

International career^{‡}
2022	Wales U18		
2024–	Seychelles	9	(0)
- * Club domestic league appearances and goals ‡ National team caps and goals as of 05:58, 10 October 2026 (UTC)

Tyrone Cadeau (born 14 June 2004) is a footballer who plays as a midfielder for Cymru Premier club Briton Ferry Llansawel and the Seychelles national team.

Cadeau spent his early career with Pontardawe Town and Briton Ferry, before spending a season in the reserves at Port Vale. He ended the 2022–23 season with Matlock Town, before spending the 2023–24 campaign with Kidsgrove Athletic. He signed with Stafford Rangers following a trial period in July 2024 and joined Hanley Town via Newcastle Town in 2025. He won the Midland League Premier Division title with Hanley in the 2025–26 campaign. He rejoined Welsh club Briton Ferry Llansawel in September 2026.

== Club career ==
Cadeau began his career with Pontardawe Town of the Cymru South. He scored the reserve side's opening goal of the 2021–22 season in a win over Cwmamman United. Later he moved to Briton Ferry Llansawel of the same league and was playing for the first team. He made further appearances for the club in the 2021–22 Welsh Cup, including a defeat to Trefelin.

In 2022, Cadeau joined EFL League Two club Port Vale. He appeared for the club in the 2022–23 Staffordshire Senior Cup. He scored in a 6–3 semi-final defeat to Rushall Olympic which saw Port Vale eliminated from the competition.

In January 2023, Cadeau joined Northern Premier League Premier Division club Matlock Town as a free agent. He made four league appearances for the club over the remainder of the 2022–23 season. Later in 2023, he moved to Kidsgrove Athletic of the Northern Premier League Division One West. Soon thereafter, he opened the scoring in the third minute of a 2023–24 FA Trophy match against Gresley Rovers. The eventual 6–0 victory saw the club advance to second round of qualifying.

In July 2024, Cadeau signed with Stafford Rangers after a trial period which included a match against Sutton Coldfield Town. He signed with Newcastle Town, also of the Northern Premier League Division One West, on 23 June 2025. He moved on to Hanley Town of the Midland League on 3 October. Hanley were promoted as league champions at the end of the 2025–26 campaign.

In September 2026, he rejoined Cymru Premier club Briton Ferry Llansawel.

== International career ==
As a youth, Cadeau represented Wales as a member of the national under-18 team in the 2022 Centenary Shield. Wales went on to win the title with a win over the Republic of Ireland. Cadeau was mentioned as a key contributor of the Wales squad that won the cup for the first time in 41 years.

In 2024, Cadeau was included in the Seychelles' roster for 2026 FIFA World Cup qualification. He made his debut against the Gambia on 8 June 2024, coming on as a second-half substitute. Three days later, he was part of the starting eleven for the first time in the match against Burundi.

== Career statistics ==
=== Club ===
As of end of the 2025–26 season

Appearances and goals by club, season and competition
Club	Season	League			FA Cup		Other		Total	
Club	Season	Division	Apps	Goals	Apps	Goals	Apps	Goals	Apps	Goals
Matlock Town	2022–23	Northern Premier League; Premier Division	4	0	0	0	0	0	4	0
Kidsgrove Athletic	2023–24	Northern Premier League; Division One West	30	1	3	0	5 (Note: 2 appearances in and 1 goal FA Trophy, 3 appearances and 2 goals in the Staffordshire Senior Cup)	3	38	4
Stafford Rangers	2024–25	Northern Premier League; Division One West	6	2	0	0	0	0	6	2
Newcastle Town	2025–26	Northern Premier League; Division One West	2	0	0	0	0	0	2	0

=== International ===
As of match played 9 September 2025

Seychelles national team
Year	Apps	Goals
2024	5	0
2025	4	0
Total	9	0

== Honours ==
Hanley Town

- Midland League Premier Division: 2025–26
