= Matias Etchegoyen =

Argentine footballer

Matías Etchegoyen
Personal information
- Full name: Juan Matías Etchegoyen
- Date of birth: 24 February 1995 (age 31)
- Place of birth: Florida, Argentina
- Height: 1.79 m (5 ft 10 in)
- Position: Midfielder

Team information
- Current team: Castrumfavara

Youth career
- –2016: Club Atlético Acassuso

Senior career*
Years	Team	Apps	(Gls)
2015–2018	Club Atlético Acassuso	23	(0)
2018–2019	Varese	13	(1)
2019–2020	Metropolitanos	27	(0)
2020	Mons Calpe	3	(0)
2020–2021	Aberystwyth Town	6	(0)
2021	Sant'Angelo 1907		
2021–2022	A.O. Ypato		
2022–2023	PAS Korinthos		
2023–2024	Francavilla		
2024–2025	Sancataldese	14	(1)
2025	Fermana	15	(0)
2025	Taranto		
2025–	Castrumfavara	4	(0)
- * Club domestic league appearances and goals as of 18 January 2026

Juan Matías Etchegoyen (born 24 February 1995) is an Argentine footballer who plays as a midfielder for Italian Serie D club Castrumfavara.

== Personal life ==
Born in Florida, Argentina, Etchegoyen also holds Italian citizenship.

== Career ==
Etchegoyen went through the youth ranks with local side Club Atlético Acassuso and later broke into the first team in 2016. After two years with the Acassuso first-team, Etchegoyen moved to Italy, joining Varese.

He only spent a year in Italy before moving back to South America to join Venezuelan side Metropolitanos in 2019. He made 23 appearances picking up 13 yellow cards during his time in Venezuela.

In January 2020, he joined Gibraltar Premier Division side Mons Calpe but only made 3 appearances due to the ongoing COVID-19 pandemic in Europe, he left at the end of the season.

In October 2020, Etchegoyen joined Cymru Premier side Aberystwyth Town.
