= Lassana Mendes =

Guinea Bissau footballer (born 1992)

Personal information
- Full name: Lassana Nalatche Mendes
- Date of birth: 26 December 1992 (age 33)
- Place of birth: Guinea-Bissau
- Position: Midfielder

Team information
- Current team: Flint Town United
- Number: 7

Youth career
- La Mojonera

Senior career*
Years	Team	Apps	(Gls)
- Cádiz
- Roquetas
- Poli Ejido
–2017	Radcliffe Borough	36	(0)
2017	Stalybridge Celtic	4	(0)
2017–2019	Colwyn Bay		
2019–2023	Bala Town	103	(15)
2023–2024	Hereford	28	(3)
2024–2026	Bala Town	48	(3)
2026–	Flint Town United	15	(3)
- * Club domestic league appearances and goals as of 06:37, 7 November 2026 (UTC)

Lassana Nalatche Mendes (born 26 December 1992) is a Bissau-Guinean footballer who plays as a midfielder for Cymru Premier club Flint Town United.

== Career ==
Early in his career, Mendes played for Cádiz, Roquetas and Poli Ejido, making appearances in the Segunda División B, before moving to England with Radcliffe Borough. A brief spell at Stalybridge Celtic followed before moving to Welsh-based Northern Premier League Division One North club Colwyn Bay. He was voted supporters' and manager's player of the year during his two years at the club, and also scored their last ever goal in English football before the club transferred to the Welsh league system.

In July 2019, after an extended trial with Crewe Alexandra, Mendes signed for Cymru Premier club Bala Town. He signed a new contract in May 2022, to extend his stay for a further year. In January 2023, Mendes was sent off in a Welsh League Cup fixture for throwing the ball into the crowd.

On 12 May 2023, Mendes signed for National League North club Hereford on a one-year contract. He was suspended for the first three league fixtures of the season due to the red card received in the Welsh League Cup earlier in the year. He made his debut in the fourth league fixture of the season, after the expiry of his suspension.

Mendes returned to Bala Town in June 2024 after one season with Hereford.

In July 2026 he joined Flint Town United.

== Career statistics ==
As of match played 26 April 2025

Appearances and goals by club, season and competition
Club	Season	League			National cup (Note: Includes Welsh Cup, FA Cup)		League cup (Note: Includes Welsh League Cup, EFL Cup)		Other		Total	
Club	Season	Division	Apps	Goals	Apps	Goals	Apps	Goals	Apps	Goals	Apps	Goals
Stalybridge Celtic	2017–18	NPL Premier Division	4	0	0	0	—		—		4	0
Bala Town	2019–20	Cymru Premier	25	3	1	0	4	1	0	0	30	4
Bala Town	2020–21	Cymru Premier	24	3	0	0	0	0	2 (Note: Appearance(s) in UEFA Europa League)	0	26	3
Bala Town	2021–22	Cymru Premier	25	5	2	0	4	0	2 (Note: Appearance(s) in UEFA Europa Conference League)	0	33	5
Bala Town	2022–23	Cymru Premier	29	4	5	0	5	2	2	1	41	7
Bala Town	Total		103	15	8	0	13	3	6	1	130	19
Hereford	2023–24	National League North	28	3	3	1	—		4 (Note: Appearance(s) in FA Trophy)	0	35	4
Bala Town	2024–25	Cymru Premier	21	1	3	3	2	0	3 (Note: Two appearances in UEFA Europa Conference League; one appearance in Cymru Premier European play-offs)	0	29	4
Career total			156	19	14	4	15	3	13	1	198	27

== Honours ==
=== Bala Town ===
- Welsh League Cup: 2022–23
