= 2008–09 in Welsh football =

== FAW Premier Cup ==
The FAW Premier Cup was discontinued, 2007-08 being the last season the competition was run.

== Welsh Cup ==
Bangor City won the 2009 Welsh Cup beating Aberystwyth Town 2–0 in the final.

== Welsh League Cup ==
The New Saints won the 2009 Welsh League Cup beating Bangor City 2–0 in the final.

== Welsh Premier League ==
- Champions: Llanelli
- Relegated to Cymru Alliance: Caernarfon Town

== Welsh Football League Division One ==
- Champions: Aberaman Athletic - not promoted as failed Welsh Premier League ground requirements.

== Cymru Alliance League ==
- Champions: Bala Town - promoted to Welsh Premier League
