= Briton Ferry Llansawel A.F.C. =

Association football club in Wales

Coordinates: 51°38′31.7″N 3°48′49″W

Briton Ferry Llansawel
- Full name: Briton Ferry Llansawel Athletic Football Club
- Nickname: The Ferry
- Founded: 2009
- Ground: Old Road, Briton Ferry
- Capacity: 2,000
- Chairman: Wyn Evans
- Manager: Andy Dyer
- League: Cymru Premier
- 2025–26: Cymru Premier, 8th of 12
- Website: http://www.britonferryllansawelafc.com/
Home colours	Away colours

Briton Ferry Llansawel Association Football Club (Welsh: Clwb Pêl-droed Llansawel) is a football club based in Briton Ferry in Wales, currently playing in the Cymru Premier. The club was formed in 2009 after the merger between Briton Ferry Athletic and Llansawel.

The club's crest uses the colours green, red and yellow, which represent the colours of the two merged teams. For 2009–10 the home colours were the traditional Briton Ferry quartered red and green shirt, green shorts and red socks. The away colours were the traditional Llansawel yellow shirt, black shorts and hooped yellow and black socks.

== History ==
During the summer of 2009, representatives of Briton Ferry Athletic and Llansawel entered into discussion about the possibility of merging the two clubs. After a lengthy period of consideration, it was announced that the two clubs had merged to form Briton Ferry Llansawel.

They were to play their first season in Welsh Football League Third Division, replacing Briton Ferry Athletic. South Gower replaced Llansawel after they applied for membership to the league. In their first season the merged club finished 4th.

In 2012 the club was promoted to the Welsh Football League Second Division, and two years later were promoted again to the First Division. In 2016 they were relegated back to the Second Division but finished second in their first season and returned to the First Division.

In 2019 they were founder members of the Cymru South, where they finished 3rd in their first season. After the COVID-19 pandemic were two more third-place finishes, before winning the 2023–24 title and gaining promotion to the Cymru Premier. In their first Cymru Premier season they finished 10th. On 10 August 2025 they beat defending champions The New Saints 3–0. This was The New Saints' heaviest defeat in four years and their first loss on the opening day of the season in eight years.

== Current squad ==
As of 26 October 2026

Note: Flags indicate national team as defined under FIFA eligibility rules; some limited exceptions apply. Players may hold more than one non-FIFA nationality.

No.	Pos.	Nation	Player
1	GK	WAL	Rhys Wilson
2	DF	WAL	Luis Bates
3	DF	WAL	Dylan Packer
4	DF	WAL	Alex Gammond (captain)
5	DF	ENG	Matt Chubb
6	DF	WAL	Iestyn Jones (on loan from Swansea City)
7	MF	WAL	Ricky Lee-Owen
8	MF	WAL	Tom Price
9	FW	WAL	Tom Walters
11	FW	WAL	Corey Hurford
12	MF	WAL	Joseph Lloyd
13	GK	ENG	Will Fuller

No.	Pos.	Nation	Player
14	FW	WAL	Luke Bowen (player/coach)
15	DF	WAL	Luke Cooper
16	FW	WAL	Ruben Davies
17	MF	WAL	Tristan Jenkins
18	DF	WAL	Ryan George
19	MF	WAL	Luke Salter
20	FW	WAL	Ollie Anderson
21	DF	WAL	Jacob Jones
22	MF	WAL	Lowan Herdman
23	MF	WAL	Malcolm Nicholls
25	GK	WAL	Dylan Gilpin
26	MF	SEY	Tyrone Cadeau

=== Out on loan ===
Note: Flags indicate national team as defined under FIFA eligibility rules; some limited exceptions apply. Players may hold more than one non-FIFA nationality.

No.	Pos.	Nation	Player
10	FW	WAL	Sam Snaith (at Cardiff Met until January 2027)

== Ground ==
The club plays at the Old Road ground in Briton Ferry. Their record attendance is 1,384, achieved on 31 December 2024 in a 0–0 draw against Barry Town United.
