= 2010–11 Welsh National League (Wrexham Area) =

Guy Walmsley & Co Welsh National League
- Season: 2010–11

The 2010–11 Guy Walmsley & Co Welsh National League is the sixty-sixth season of the Welsh National League (Wrexham Area). The league began on 14 August 2010 and finished on 20 May 2011.

== Premier Division ==
Guy Walmsley & Co Welsh National League Premier Division
- Champions: Penycae
- Promoted: Penycae
- Relegated: Lex XI
- Matches: 240
- Goals: 974 (4.06 per match)
- Biggest home win: Lex XI 7–1 Llay Welfare; 14 August 2010; Venture Community 6–0 Llay Welfare; 23 April 2011; Penycae 7–1 Johnstown Youth; 26 April 2011
- Biggest away win: Lex XI 0–12 FC Cefn; 14 May 2011
- Highest scoring: Lex XI 0–12 FC Cefn; 14 May 2011

=== League table ===
Pos	Team	Pld	W	D	L	GF	GA	GD	Pts	Promotion or relegation
1	Penycae (C, P)	30	21	2	7	85	36	+49	65	Promotion to 2011–12 Cymru Alliance
2	Venture Community	30	19	6	5	83	38	+45	63	
3	Chirk AAA	30	19	4	7	61	37	+24	61	
4	Coedpoeth United	30	18	6	6	84	56	+28	60	
5	FC Cefn	30	16	7	7	92	65	+27	55	
6	Corwen	30	15	6	9	56	41	+15	51	
7	Hawarden Rangers	30	15	5	10	73	55	+18	50	
8	Overton Recreation	30	11	8	11	60	57	+3	41	
9	Mold Alexandra	30	11	6	13	53	62	−9	39	
10	Llangollen Town	30	10	7	13	65	74	−9	37	
11	Llay Welfare	30	11	4	15	51	65	−14	37	
12	Johnstown Youth	30	8	7	15	43	81	−38	31	
13	Gresford Athletic	30	7	6	17	40	61	−21	27	
14	Brymbo	30	5	7	18	43	78	−35	22	
15	Brickfield Rangers	30	5	4	21	44	85	−41	19	
16	Lex XI (R)	30	4	5	21	41	83	−42	17	Relegation to Welsh National League Division One

Updated to match(es) played on 20 May 2011. Source: Welsh National League
Rules for classification: 1) points; 2) goal difference; 3) number of goals scored.
(C) Champions; (P) Promoted; (R) Relegated

=== Results ===
Home \ Away	BRI	BRY	CAA	COE	COR	FCC	GRE	HAW	JOH	LEX	LNT	LLW	MOL	OVR	PYC	VEN
Brickfield Rangers		4–1	0–3	1–3	1–2	1–4	1–1	2–2	4–1	3–2	2–5	0–3	3–2	0–2	0–5	2–4
Brymbo	3–2		2–3	0–6	3–3	2–5	1–2	3–2	1–1	1–1	4–2	3–4	0–0	2–2	2–4	0–4
Chirk AAA	1–0	1–1		3–2	2–0	4–2	2–0	3–3	0–1	3–0	2–1	2–0	4–3	5–2	0–3	2–0
Coedpoeth United	5–2	6–4	2–1		2–1	2–1	1–0	3–2	4–2	2–1	3–5	3–5	5–1	3–3	2–1	1–1
Corwen	4–0	6–1	2–1	1–5		1–1	3–1	1–1	3–0	2–1	1–1	1–3	2–1	5–1	1–1	2–0
FC Cefn	3–3	2–1	3–2	5–3	3–3		2–1	4–0	7–2	2–1	1–4	2–3	1–0	2–3	3–2	3–3
Gresford Athletic	2–1	0–0	0–1	3–3	3–0	3–3		2–1	2–4	4–1	0–0	0–2	2–0	3–4	4–2	1–2
Hawarden Rangers	5–2	1–0	2–5	1–2	2–2	3–3	3–0		2–1	2–1	5–3	2–0	1–3	3–2	1–2	1–3
Johnstown Youth	2–1	2–3	0–0	1–5	2–0	2–4	1–1	0–5		4–2	1–5	2–0	2–2	2–1	0–3	1–3
Lex XI	1–3	0–3	0–1	0–2	0–3	0–12	3–0	0–5	2–2		5–1	7–1	2–3	2–2	0–1	1–3
Llangollen Town	3–2	0–0	1–3	2–2	0–2	3–3	4–2	2–5	1–2	4–2		4–3	5–1	1–3	0–4	3–3
Llay Welfare	5–1	1–0	4–0	0–4	0–1	3–4	1–0	0–1	6–1	2–2	1–2		1–1	0–1	0–5	1–1
Mold Alexandra	3–0	3–0	0–4	3–1	2–1	3–1	3–1	1–3	3–3	1–1	3–0	4–0		2–4	1–1	1–6
Overton Recreation	2–2	2–1	1–1	1–1	1–0	1–2	4–1	2–1	4–0	0–1	2–2	2–2	2–3		0–1	1–2
Penycae	5–1	5–2	2–0	4–0	2–1	0–2	5–1	2–4	7–1	4–1	2–0	3–0	3–1	4–3		2–4
Venture Community	2–0	4–0	0–2	1–1	1–2	6–2	3–0	2–4	0–0	7–2	5–1	6–0	3–0	3–2	1–0	

Updated to match(es) played on 20 May 2011. Source: Welsh National League
Legend: Blue = home team win; Yellow = draw; Red = away team win.

== Division One ==
Guy Walmsley & Co Welsh National League Division One
- Champions: Penyffordd
- Promoted: Penyffordd
- Matches: 156
- Goals: 698 (4.47 per match)
- Biggest home win: Saltney Town 11–0 Hawkesbury Villa; 11 December 2010; Llanuwchllyn 11–0 Hawkesbury Villa; 14 May 2011
- Biggest away win: Glyn Ceiriog 0–7 Penyffordd; 16 April 2011
- Highest scoring: Saltney Town 12–2 Castell Alun Colts; 28 August 2010

Communities First were also due to compete, but resigned mid-season so were not included in the final table.

=== League table ===
Pos	Team	Pld	W	D	L	GF	GA	GD	Pts	Promotion
1	Penyffordd (C, P)	24	18	3	3	84	31	+53	57	Promotion to Welsh National League Premier Division
2	Borras Park Albion	24	17	5	2	77	28	+49	56	
3	Saltney Town	24	15	4	5	73	45	+28	49	
4	New Brighton Villa	24	14	4	6	58	37	+21	46	
5	Castell Alun Colts	24	12	3	9	52	54	−2	39	
6	Buckley United	24	11	3	10	51	38	+13	36	
7	Acrefair Youth	24	11	4	9	65	57	+8	34 (Note: Acrefair Youth and Penley deducted three points)	
8	Garden Village	24	8	6	10	47	52	−5	30	
9	Llanuwchllyn	24	8	5	11	57	48	+9	29	
10	Penley	24	8	4	12	59	59	0	25	
11	Mold Juniors	24	4	4	16	33	67	−34	16	
12	Hawkesbury Villa	24	3	4	17	23	75	−52	13	
13	Glyn Ceiriog	24	1	3	20	19	107	−88	6	

Updated to match(es) played on 17 May 2011. Source: Welsh National League
Rules for classification: 1) points; 2) goal difference; 3) number of goals scored.
(C) Champions; (P) Promoted

=== Results ===
Home \ Away	ACY	BPA	BUC	CAC	GVY	GCE	HWK	LLC	MDJ	NBV	PEN	PFD	SAL
Acrefair Youth		1–5	2–4	3–5	4–1	3–0	4–0	3–3	6–2	2–3	4–3	4–8	1–1
Borras Park Albion	2–2		5–1	3–0	3–3	6–1	1–1	1–1	4–0	4–0	3–2	1–3	3–2
Buckley United	4–0	2–3		2–3	3–1	4–0	2–0	1–2	2–2	2–1	1–0	1–0	3–4
Castell Alun Colts	0–0	0–0	2–0		1–3	4–0	1–0	3–2	3–0	3–3	3–2	0–5	6–1
Garden Village	1–3	1–3	1–0	1–0		4–0	1–1	5–2	0–0	4–1	3–3	1–4	3–4
Glyn Ceiriog	0–4	1–4	0–6	1–3	2–4		1–5	1–0	1–1	1–1	3–9	0–7	1–5
Hawkesbury Villa	1–4	2–3	1–1	4–2	1–4	0–0		2–1	0–3	1–2	1–4	0–3	0–1
Llanuwchllyn	2–5	0–3	3–3	4–1	3–1	9–0	11–0		1–0	2–2	2–1	0–4	0–1
Mold Juniors	2–5	1–3	0–5	2–5	2–2	6–1	1–0	0–6		2–3	2–1	2–3	0–1
New Brighton Villa	3–2	2–1	1–0	3–2	5–0	7–0	3–0	5–1	3–0		4–1	2–2	2–1
Penley	1–2	1–7	3–0	0–2	2–2	6–1	3–2	2–1	6–2	3–2		4–4	2–2
Penyffordd	2–1	1–4	1–2	2–1	3–0	4–0	8–1	3–0	4–1	2–0	3–0		4–4
Saltney Town	4–0	0–5	3–2	12–2	2–1	5–4	11–0	1–1	2–1	1–0	3–0	2–4	

Updated to match(es) played on 17 May 2011. Source: Welsh National League
Legend: Blue = home team win; Yellow = draw; Red = away team win.
