= 2008–09 Welsh National League (Wrexham Area) =

Nizam-Druid Welsh National League
- Season: 2008–09

Nizam-Druid Welsh National League Premier Division
- Champions: Llangollen Town
- Promoted: Llangollen Town
- Relegated: Acrefair Youth
- Matches played: 210
- Goals scored: 839 (4 per match)

Nizam-Druid Welsh National League Division One
- Champions: FC Cefn
- Promoted: FC Cefn
- Matches played: 132
- Goals scored: 639 (4.84 per match)

The 2008–09 Nizam-Druid Welsh National League was the sixty-fourth season of the Welsh National League (Wrexham Area). The league was reduced to two divisions for senior teams this season, the remaining two divisions were made into reserves and colts leagues. The Premier Division was won by Llangollen Town, who gained promotion to the Cymru Alliance.

== Premier Division ==
=== League table ===
Pos	Team	Pld	W	D	L	GF	GA	GD	Pts	Promotion or relegation
1	Llangollen Town (C, P)	28	22	4	2	89	31	+58	70	Promotion to 2009–10 Cymru Alliance
2	Penycae	28	20	5	3	75	30	+45	65	
3	Rhos Aelwyd	28	18	6	4	77	36	+41	60	
4	Hawarden Rangers	28	17	8	3	64	28	+36	59	
5	Coedpoeth United	28	16	5	7	77	39	+38	53	
6	Castell Alun Colts	28	11	6	11	52	60	−8	39	
7	Borras Park Albion	28	12	2	14	53	55	−2	38	
8	Llay Welfare	28	9	4	15	48	68	−20	31	
9	Chirk AAA	28	8	6	14	47	54	−7	30	
10	Brickfield Rangers	28	9	3	16	55	69	−14	30	
11	Venture Community	28	6	10	12	46	54	−8	28	
12	Corwen Amateurs	28	7	7	14	45	63	−18	28	
13	Overton Recreation	28	6	9	13	40	58	−18	27	
14	Brymbo	28	4	6	18	39	81	−42	18	
15	Acrefair Youth (R)	28	3	3	22	32	113	−81	12	Relegation to Welsh National League Division One

Source: Welsh National League
Rules for classification: 1) points; 2) goal difference; 3) number of goals scored.
(C) Champions; (P) Promoted; (R) Relegated

== Division One ==
=== League table ===
Pos	Team	Pld	W	D	L	GF	GA	GD	Pts	Promotion
1	FC Cefn (C, P)	22	19	1	2	88	37	+51	58	Promotion to Welsh National League Premier Division
2	Gwersyllt Athletic	22	15	4	3	65	29	+36	49	
3	Penyffordd	22	14	4	4	66	33	+33	46	
4	New Brighton Villa	22	14	4	4	62	31	+31	46	
5	Penley	22	13	2	7	70	45	+25	41	
6	Johnstown Youth	22	11	1	10	54	46	+8	34	
7	Communities First	22	9	2	11	61	45	+16	29	
8	Garden Village	22	7	7	8	38	45	−7	28	
9	Holt Nomads	22	4	4	14	50	74	−24	16	
10	Glyn Ceiriog	22	3	5	14	35	79	−44	14	
11	Mold Juniors	22	4	0	18	30	76	−46	12	
12	Llanuwchllyn	22	1	2	19	20	99	−79	5	

Source: Welsh National League
Rules for classification: 1) points; 2) goal difference; 3) number of goals scored.
(C) Champions; (P) Promoted
