= 2011–12 Welsh National League (Wrexham Area) =

Guy Walmsley & Co Welsh National League
- Season: 2011–12

The 2011–12 Guy Walmsley & Co Welsh National League is the sixty-seventh season of the Welsh National League. The Premier Division began on 12 August 2011 and ended on 17 May 2012. Division One began on 13 August 2011 and ended on 19 May 2012.

== Premier Division ==
Guy Walmsley & Co Welsh National League Premier Division
- Champions: FC Cefn
- Promoted: FC Cefn
- Relegated: Johnstown Youth
- Matches: 240
- Goals: 1,004 (4.18 per match)
- Biggest home win: Rhydymwyn 10–0 Johnstown Youth; 10 March 2012; Gresford Athletic 10–0 Johnstown Youth; 1 May 2012
- Biggest away win: Johnstown Youth 0–10 FC Cefn; 25 February 2012
- Highest scoring: Llay Welfare 5–8 FC Cefn; 17 March 2012

=== League table ===
Pos	Team	Pld	W	D	L	GF	GA	GD	Pts	Promotion or relegation
1	FC Cefn (C, P)	30	23	3	4	100	45	+55	72	Promotion to 2012–13 Cymru Alliance
2	Rhydymwyn	30	23	0	7	100	42	+58	69	
3	Chirk AAA	30	21	2	7	94	45	+49	65	
4	Mold Alexandra	30	17	8	5	65	34	+31	59	
5	Venture Community	30	18	4	8	86	49	+37	58	
6	Hawarden Rangers	30	14	9	7	55	40	+15	51	
7	Gresford Athletic	30	15	4	11	63	46	+17	49	
8	Brymbo	30	13	5	12	62	57	+5	44	
9	Llangollen Town	30	12	7	11	70	58	+12	43	
10	Penyffordd	30	13	4	13	66	62	+4	43	
11	Coedpoeth United	30	11	3	16	65	74	−9	36	
12	Corwen	30	10	5	15	46	59	−13	35	
13	Overton Recreation	30	6	6	18	36	58	−22	24	
14	Brickfield Rangers	30	4	4	22	31	100	−69	16	
15	Llay Welfare	30	3	4	23	42	99	−57	13	
16	Johnstown Youth (R)	30	1	4	25	23	136	−113	7	Relegation to Welsh National League Division One

Updated to match(es) played on 17 May 2012. Source: Welsh National League
Rules for classification: 1) points; 2) goal difference; 3) number of goals scored.
(C) Champions; (P) Promoted; (R) Relegated

=== Results ===
Home \ Away	BRI	BRY	CAA	COE	COR	FCC	GRE	HAW	JOH	LNT	LLW	MOL	OVR	PFD	RHY	VEN
Brickfield Rangers		3–3	1–4	2–0	0–1	0–3	0–1	1–2	3–2	1–6	1–1	0–0	0–0	2–3	3–4	0–8
Brymbo	1–0		1–3	2–3	4–3	1–2	6–0	1–1	1–1	3–3	2–0	3–2	5–0	2–1	1–4	2–3
Chirk AAA	8–0	0–1		4–3	4–1	0–1	1–2	0–0	7–0	4–1	4–0	1–4	3–2	4–1	5–0	1–5
Coedpoeth United	3–2	3–1	1–5		3–1	4–1	2–4	1–5	7–3	3–0	5–1	1–2	1–3	2–3	2–3	3–3
Corwen	5–0	3–1	1–3	0–2		1–2	2–3	2–2	1–1	3–2	2–1	0–0	1–1	5–1	0–1	0–5
FC Cefn	4–2	3–1	3–4	5–1	4–2		3–2	5–1	7–3	2–0	8–1	3–2	2–1	6–3	1–2	1–1
Gresford Athletic	3–1	2–3	1–3	3–3	2–0	0–1		5–1	10–0	2–3	2–0	1–1	2–0	2–0	1–2	1–2
Hawarden Rangers	4–0	4–2	1–4	4–1	1–1	1–1	2–1		1–0	1–1	5–1	0–1	0–0	3–2	1–0	1–1
Johnstown Youth	0–1	0–2	0–2	2–1	0–2	0–10	0–2	0–4		2–2	3–4	0–6	1–5	1–6	0–6	1–9
Llangollen Town	8–1	2–2	3–1	2–3	0–1	3–2	1–0	1–3	8–1		3–1	2–1	2–2	1–3	1–3	1–2
Llay Welfare	0–5	1–2	2–4	2–2	0–1	5–8	1–3	2–3	5–1	2–2		0–0	0–2	1–2	0–8	2–6
Mold Alexandra	6–0	0–1	5–4	4–2	2–0	0–0	1–1	2–1	3–0	2–2	3–0		3–2	2–1	2–1	3–0
Overton Recreation	3–0	0–3	1–4	2–1	0–2	1–2	1–3	1–1	3–0	0–2	0–2	0–2		1–2	0–2	2–3
Penyffordd	9–1	3–2	1–1	0–1	3–1	0–3	4–1	1–0	1–1	2–3	6–4	2–2	2–2		1–2	2–1
Rhydymwyn	5–0	5–3	3–4	2–1	7–2	1–3	0–1	1–0	10–0	3–1	4–3	6–2	5–0	1–0		7–1
Venture Community	3–1	2–0	0–2	3–0	4–1	2–4	2–2	1–2	6–0	2–4	2–0	0–2	2–1	4–1	3–2	

Updated to match(es) played on 17 May 2012. Source: Welsh National League
Legend: Blue = home team win; Yellow = draw; Red = away team win.

== Division One ==
Guy Walmsley & Co Welsh National League Division One
- Champions: Saltney Town
- Promoted: Saltney Town
- Matches: 155
- Goals: 778 (5.02 per match)
- Biggest home win: Borras Park Albion 15–0 Glyn Ceiriog; 10 September 2011
- Biggest away win: Hawkesbury Villa 0–12 Saltney Town; 31 March 2012
- Highest scoring: Borras Park Albion 15–0 Glyn Ceiriog; 10 September 2011

=== League table ===
Pos	Team	Pld	W	D	L	GF	GA	GD	Pts	Promotion
1	Saltney Town (C, P)	24	19	3	2	130	28	+102	60	Promotion to Welsh National League Premier Division
2	Borras Park Albion	24	20	2	2	127	34	+93	59 (Note: Acrefair Youth, Borras Park Albion & Lex XI deducted three points)	
3	Argoed United	24	18	4	2	54	19	+35	58	
4	Castell Alun Colts	24	14	3	7	79	59	+20	45	
5	Mold Juniors	24	11	3	10	51	67	−16	36	
6	Acrefair Youth	24	11	5	8	66	52	+14	35	
7	New Brighton Villa	24	9	8	7	54	46	+8	35	
8	Penley	24	8	6	10	67	69	−2	30	
9	Lex XI	24	8	4	12	44	46	−2	25	
10	Glyn Ceiriog	24	6	0	18	29	109	−80	18	
11	Garden Village	24	3	6	15	21	65	−44	15	
12	Llanuwchllyn	23	3	3	17	37	84	−47	12	
13	Hawkesbury Villa	23	1	1	21	19	100	−81	4	

Updated to match(es) played on 19 May 2012. Source: Welsh National League
Rules for classification: 1) points; 2) goal difference; 3) number of goals scored.
(C) Champions; (P) Promoted

=== Results ===
Home \ Away	ACY	ARG	BPA	CAC	GVY	GCE	HWK	LEX	LLC	MDJ	NBV	PEN	SAL
Acrefair Youth		0–5	1–9	9–1	5–0	2–4	3–1	4–2	6–3	3–0	1–1	6–3	1–4
Argoed United	7–0		1–1	4–1	3–0	6–1	2–0	2–0	5–0	2–1	3–0	3–2	0–3
Borras Park Albion	2–1	5–2		2–4	2–1	15–0	9–2	5–3	6–3	12–0	7–2	3–3	5–2
Castell Alun Colts	1–1	1–2	2–4		3–1	4–0	6–0	4–1	5–2	4–5	3–2	3–4	1–9
Garden Village	1–1	0–0	1–5	2–8		0–1	1–0	0–0	1–4	1–0	0–4	1–1	1–8
Glyn Ceiriog	1–6	0–4	1–6	0–5	1–2		3–2	0–4	3–2	1–3	1–7	3–2	0–7
Hawkesbury Villa	1–4	0–1	0–9	1–4	2–1	1–4		0–2	2–2	2–3	0–1	2–8	0–12
Lex XI	1–2	0–1	3–4	2–4	4–0	5–2	4–0		2–0	0–1	1–2	0–0	0–6
Llanuwchllyn	2–2	1–2	0–6	3–4	2–2	1–0		1–4		2–3	3–2	0–5	0–1
Mold Juniors	0–3	0–1	0–4	1–1	2–0	6–0	7–2	2–2	4–3		1–0	3–0	3–9
New Brighton Villa	2–2	1–1	0–4	1–1	2–1	6–1	2–0	1–1	2–0	3–3		6–2	2–2
Penley	5–3	1–2	1–3	2–6	3–3	5–2	5–1	0–2	2–1	4–1	4–4		3–3
Saltney Town	2–0	1–1	1–0	1–3	4–1	8–0	7–0	5–1	9–2	7–1	4–1	8–2	

Updated to match(es) played on 19 May 2012. Source: Welsh National League
Legend: Blue = home team win; Yellow = draw; Red = away team win.
