= 2008–09 Welsh Cup =

Tournament details
- Country: Wales

Final positions
- Champions: Bangor City
- Runners-up: Aberystwyth Town

The 2008–09 FAW Welsh Cup was the 122nd season of the annual knockout tournament for competitive football teams in Wales, excluding those who play in the English League System. The 2008–09 tournament commenced on 16 August 2008, and was covered live and exclusive on S4C in the UK.

== Calendar ==
Round	Date	Fixtures	New entrants	Prize money
Preliminary Round	16 August 2008	22	44	
First Round	13 September 2008	46	70	
Second Round	4 October 2008	32	18	Losers: £500
Third Round	1 November 2008	16		Losers: £1,000
Fourth Round	31 January 2009	8		Losers: £2,500
Quarterfinals	28 February 2009	4		Losers: £5,000
Semifinals	11 April 2009	2		Losers: £10,000
Final	4 May 2009	1		Winner: £25,000; Loser: £15,000

== Preliminary round ==
The games were played on 16 August 2008.

=== South ===
Team 1	Score	Team 2
Aberbargoed Buds	3–4	Cwmaman Institute
AFC Llwydcoed	4–2	Ystradgynlais
Briton Ferry Athletic	2–1	Troedyrhiw
Carno	1–3	Tredegar Town
Cwmamman United	4–2	Llansawel
Goytre	1–3	Newport Civil Service
Llantwit Fardre	0–2	AFC Porth
Merthyr Saints	0–9	Pontyclun
Porthcawl Town	2–1^{1}	Monmouth Town
Risca United	2–2 (aet, p. 3–2)	Seven Sisters

^{1}First match was postponed and the replay was held at Lock's Lane, Porthcawl on 3 September 2008

=== Mid ===
Team 1	Score	Team 2
Tywyn/Bryncrug	2–0	Newbridge-on-Wye
Castell Alun Colts	4–0	Presteigne St Andrews
Venture Community	2–1	Dyffryn Banw
Borras Park Albion	2–3	Brickfield Rangers
Glyn Ceiriog	0–6	Coedpoeth United
Bow Street	4–2	Overton Recreation

=== North ===
Team 1	Score	Team 2
Bethesda Athletic	7–0	Corwen
Holywell Town	1–2	Nefyn United
Kerry	0–2	Llanberis
Llanllyfni	4–2	Llanfyllin Town
Llanrug United	5–1	Llanrhaeadr Ym Mochnant
Rhayader Town	2–4	Pwllheli

== First round ==
The matches were played on 13 September 2008.

Team 1	Score	Team 2
Afan Lido	3–0	Cwmamman United
AFC Llwydcoed	3–0	Porthcawl Town
Bettws	1–1 (aet, p. 3–4)	Taff's Well
Berriew	0–1	Llangollen Town
Brickfield Rangers	4–3	Nefyn United
Briton Ferry Athletic	3–1	AFC Porth
Brymbo	0–8	Mold Alexandra
Buckley Town	6–3	Penycae
Caerau (Ely)	1–2	Pentwyn Dynamos
Caerleon	1–4	Goytre United
Caldicot Town	0–1	Ammanford
Cambrian & Clydach Vale BGC	4–1	Newcastle Emlyn
Cardiff Corinthians	3–0	Ely Rangers
Castell Alun Colts	1–0	Llandyrnog United
Cefn United	w/o	Rhydymwyn
Conwy United	2–3 (aet)	Penrhyncoch
Croesyceiliog	0–3	Maesteg Park
Cwmbran Celtic	3–1	Garw
Denbigh Town	4–1	Llanllyfni
ENTO Aberaman Athletic	2–1	Barry Town
Flint Town United	4–3	Rhos Aelwyd
Glan Conwy	2–1 (aet)	Llanrwst United
Glantraeth	1–6	Bala Town
Grange Harlequins	1–5 (aet)	Newport Civil Service
Guilsfield	2–0	Ruthin Town
Halkyn United	4–2	Coedpoeth United
Hawarden Rangers	0–2	Llanfairpwll
Llanberis	2–3	Bow Street
Llandudno Junction	4–2	Penparcau
Llangefni Town	3–1	Llandudno
Llangeinor	0–2	Dinas Powys
Llanrug United	0–2	Pwllheli
Llanwern	3–0	Ton Pentre
Llay Welfare	8–1	Amlwch Town
Mynydd Isa	3–3 (aet, p. 5–6)	Holyhead Hotspur
Nantlle Vale	w/o	Chirk AAA
Newport YMCA	3–2	Cwmaman Institute
Penrhiwceiber Rangers	3–4	Pontypridd Town
Pontyclun	0–0 (aet, p. 1–3)	Bridgend Town
Risca United	2–0	Pontardawe Town
Tredegar Town	0–1	Gresford Athletic
Treharris Athletic	1–9	Bryntirion Athletic
Tywyn/Bryncrug	4–1	Bethesda Athletic
UWIC Inter Cardiff	1–3	Cwmbran Town
Venture Community	1–2	Lex XI
West End	2–3	Garden Village

== Second round ==
The matches were played between 3 and 10 October 2008.

Team 1	Score	Team 2
Aberystwyth Town	2–2 (aet, p. 3–2)	Afan Lido
Airbus UK Broughton	2–1	Welshpool Town
Bala Town	3–3 (aet, p. 5–4)	Prestatyn Town
Bangor City	1–0	GAP Connah's Quay
Brickfield Rangers	3–4	Buckley Town
Bridgend Town	3–1	Cwmbran Town
Bryntirion Athletic	1–2	Cardiff Corinthians
Cambrian & Clydach Vale BGC	0–1	Newtown
Carmarthen Town	6–1	Bow Street
CPD Penrhyncoch	3–2 (aet)	Maesteg Park
CPD Porthmadog	5–3	Caernafon Town
Denbigh Town	4–1	Chirk AAA
Dinas Powys	0–1 (aet)	Briton Ferry Athletic
Flint Town United	4–0	Mold Alexandra
Garden Village	2–0	Risca United
Gresford Athletic	4–1	Rhydymwyn
Holyhead Hotspur	2–1	Llay Welfare
Lex XI	2–1	Glan Conwy
Llandudno Junction	0–2	Pwllheli
Llanelli	4–0	Neath
Llangefni Town	3–0	Llanfairpwll
Llangollen Town	1–2	Tywyn/Bryncrug
Llanwern	1–6	AFC Llwydcoed
NEWI Cefn Druids	4–2	Halkyn United
Newport Civil Service	0–1	Caersws
Newport YMCA	3–2	Cwmbran Celtic
Pentwyn Dynamos	1–0	Ammanford
Pontypridd Town	1–4	Haverfordwest County
Port Talbot Town	1–0	ENTO Aberaman Athletic
Rhyl	8–0	Castell Alun Colts
Taff's Well	0–2	Goytre United
The New Saints	4–2	Guilsfield

== Third round ==
The matches were played on 31 October and 1 November 2008.

Team 1	Score	Team 2
Bangor City	4–0	Garden Village
Bridgend Town	1–0	Llangefni Town
Buckley Town	1–5	Airbus UK Broughton
Caersws	0–3	Aberystwyth Town
Cardiff Corinthians	0–6	Goytre United
Gresford Athletic	2–3 (aet)	Prestatyn Town
Holyhead Hotspur	2–1	Pentwyn Dynamos
Lex XI	2–0	CPD Porthmadog
AFC Llwydcoed	1–0	Flint Town United
NEWI Cefn Druids	1–0	Newtown
Newport YMCA	1–0	Briton Ferry Athletic
Port Talbot Town	7–0	Denbigh Town
Pwllheli	0–6	Carmarthen Town
Rhyl	4–0	Haverfordwest County
The New Saints	7–1	CPD Penrhyncoch
Tywyn/Bryncrug	0–3	Llanelli

== Fourth round ==
The matches were played on 30 and 31 January 2009.

Team 1	Score	Team 2
Holyhead Hotspur	1–1 (aet, p. 5–6)	Newport YMCA
Airbus UK Broughton	2–1	NEWI Cefn Druids
Prestatyn Town	5–3 (aet)	Goytre United
The New Saints	2–3	Carmarthen Town
Port Talbot Town	2–1	Llanelli
Bridgend Town	4–0	Lex XI
AFC Llwydcoed	0–3	Aberystwyth Town
Bangor City	1–1 (aet, p. 4–2)	Rhyl

== Quarterfinals ==
28 February 2009
13:30 UTC

Newport YMCA	0–1	Bridgend Town
		Plant 62'

The YMCA Ground, Newport

28 February 2009
14:00 UTC

Aberystwyth Town	5–1	Prestatyn Town
Kellaway 27'; Venables 45'; Evans 55' 67' 74'		Hoult 5'

Park Avenue, Aberystwyth

28 February 2009
14:00 UTC

Carmarthen Town	1–1 (aet)	Port Talbot Town
Fowler 118'		Rose 102'
Penalties
	4–1

Richmond Park, Carmarthen

28 February 2009
14:00 UTC

Airbus UK Broughton	0–5	Bangor City
		Seargeant 46'; Davies 48' 65'; Hoy 60'; Edwards 64'

The Airfield, Broughton

== Semifinals ==
11 April 2009
14:00 UTC+1

Bangor City	2–1	Bridgend Town
Seargeant 20'; Killackey 76'		Outlow 18'

Park Avenue, Aberystwyth

12 April 2009
14:10 UTC+1

Aberystwyth Town	3–2 (aet)	Carmarthen Town
Kellaway 25' 45'; Thomas 97'		Hudgell 66'; Palmer 90'

Bridge Meadow Stadium, Haverfordwest

== Final ==
4 May 2009
16:10 UTC+1

Aberystwyth Town	0–2	Bangor City
		Davies 44'; Seargeant 50'

Parc y Scarlets, Llanelli
