= 2010–11 Welsh Cup =

Tournament details
- Country: Wales
- Teams: 158

Final positions
- Champions: Llanelli
- Runners-up: Bangor City

Tournament statistics
- Matches played: 157

The 2010–11 FAW Welsh Cup was the 124th season of the annual knockout tournament for competitive football teams in Wales, excluding those who play in the English League System. The 2010–11 tournament commenced on 14 August 2010, and ran until the final in May 2011. The winner of the Cup will qualify to the second qualifying round of the 2011–12 UEFA Europa League.

== Calendar ==
Round	Date	Fixtures	New entrants	Prize money
Qualifying Round One	14 August 2010	30	60	
Qualifying Round Two	28 August 2010	48	66	
First Round	11 September 2010	40	32	Losers: £500
Second Round	2 October 2010	20	–	Losers: £750
Third Round	6 November 2010	16	12	Losers: £1,500
Fourth Round	29 January 2011	8	–	Losers: £2,500
Quarterfinals	26 February 2011	4	–	Losers: £6,000
Semifinals	19 April 2011	2	–	Losers: £12,500
Final	7 May 2011	1	–	Winner: £30,000; Loser: £20,000

== Qualifying round one ==
The draw for both qualifying rounds one and two was held on 9 July 2010. Qualifying round one games were played on 14 August 2010.

=== North ===
Team 1	Score	Team 2
Aberaeron	0–7	Bodedern Athletic
Caernarfon Wanderers	2–7	Bro Goronwy
Connah's Quay Town	10–3	Llanfair United
CPD Bethel	0–2	F.C. Nomads of Connah's Quay
Greenfield	5–3 (a.e.t.)	Machynlleth
Halkyn United	2–3	Amlwch Town
Llandyrnog United	1–1 (4–2 pen.)	CPD Llanystumdwy
Llanllyfni	3–3 (3–5 pen.)	Borras Park Albion
Meifod	1–2	Gaerwen
Penmaenmawr Phoenix	4–1	Glantraeth
Trearddur Bay United	1–0	Brynford United
Tregaron Turfs	2–3	Montgomery Town
Y Felinheli	2–1	Blaenau Ffestiniog

=== South ===
Team 1	Score	Team 2
Brecon Corinthians	0–5	Monmouth Town
Cardiff Hibernian	4–3 (a.e.t.)	Cwmbran Town
Corus Steel	1–0	Cwmamman United
Ferndale & District	0–3	Bridgend Street
Fochriw	2–1	Baglan Dragons
Llanwern	2–1	Tredegar Town
Newport Civil Service	2–3	Goytre
Penclawdd	0–3 (w/o)	Seven Sisters
Penrhiwceiber Constitutional Athletic	1–1 (3–4 pen.)	RTB Ebbw Vale
Pontyclun	3–1	Rhydyfelin
Risca United	0–1	Pontypridd Town
South Gower	2–0	Cadoxton Barry
STM Sports	3–0	Llantwit Fardre
Talgarth Town	0–5	Fleur de Lys
Treowen Stars	6–0	Cornelly United
Trethomas Bluebirds	2–1	Llandrindod Wells
Troedyrhiw	3–3 (3–4 pen.)	Nelson Cavaliers

== Qualifying round two ==
Qualifying round two games were played on 28 August 2010. The round included the thirty winners from qualifying round one, plus sixty-six new teams that entered at this level.

=== North ===
Team 1	Score	Team 2
Amlwch Town	1–3	Coedpoeth United
Barmouth & Dyffryn United	3–2	Hawarden Rangers
Borras Park Albion	7–3	Glan Conwy
Bro Goronwy	2–4	Connah's Quay Town
Brymbo	0–4	Waterloo Rovers
Caernarfon Town	5–1	Holywell Town
Carno	4–3 (a.e.t.)	Chirk AAA
Conwy United	2–1	Denbigh Town
Corwen	0–1	Dolgellau Athletic Amateur
CPD Dyffryn Nantlle	0–1	Llanrhaeadr ym Mochnant
CPD Gwalchmai	4–0	CPD Dyffryn Banw
Gaerwen	1–3	Greenfield
CPD Llanberis	0–4	Brickfield Rangers
Lex XI	3–2	F.C. Nomads of Connah's Quay
Llandudno Junction	2–4	Holyhead Hotspur
Llandyrnog United	4–2 (a.e.t.)	Llangollen Town
Llanidloes Town	2–1 (a.e.t.)	Llansantffraid Village
Llay Welfare	2–4	Bow Street
Montgomery Town	1–2	Penmaenmawr Phoenix
Nefyn United	2–1	Llanrwst United
Overton Recreational	1–3	Llanfairpwll
Penparcau	4–0	Gresford Athletic
Penycae	3–1	Llanrug United
Pwllheli	5–1	Bodedern Athletic
Trearddur Bay United	3–0	Mold Alexandra
Tywyn Bryncrug	3–2	Berriew
Venture Community	2–3	Johnstown Youth
Y Felinheli	3–5 (a.e.t.)	Bethesda Athletic

=== South ===
Team 1	Score	Team 2
Abertillery Bluebirds	1–2	Pontyclun
Ammanford	3–0	Presteigne St. Andrews
Bridgend Street	11–1	Fochriw
Briton Ferry Llansawel	1–2 (a.e.t.)	Pontypridd Town
Caerau	4–1	Newport YMCA
Cardiff Grange Harlequins	2–1	Llanwern
Corus Steel	3–2	Llwydcoed
Cwmaman Institute	1–0	Aberbargoed Buds
Ely Rangers	3–2	Caerleon
Goytre	5–4 (a.e.t.)	Llangeinor
Hay St. Marys	1–5	Porth
Nelson Cavaliers	2–4	Monmouth Town
Newbridge on Wye	3–5	South Gower
Newcastle Emlyn	2–1	Dinas Powys
RTB Ebbw Vale	1–4	Fleur de Lys
Seven Sisters	0–1	Croesyceiliog
STM Sports	4–3	Trethomas Bluebirds
Ton Pentre	0–1	Bettws
Treowen Stars	2–3	Treharris Athletic Western
UWIC	2–1	Cwmbran Town

== First round ==
The draw for the first round was held on 31 August 2010. Matches were played on 11 September 2010. Thirty-two new entrants joined the forty-eight winners from qualifying round two.

=== North ===
Team 1	Score	Team 2
Borras Park Albion	0–8	Rhos Aelwyd
Bow Street	2–1	Lex XI
Brickfield Rangers	3–4 (a.e.t.)	Bethesda Athletic
Caersws	4–0 (a.e.t.)	Rhayader Town
Carno	1–5	Porthmadog
Coedpoeth United	4–3	Greenfield
Cefn Druids	6–4 (a.e.t.)	Penycae
Connah's Quay Town	6–1	Johnstown Youth
Conwy United	4–1	Waterloo Rovers
CPD Gwalchmai	4–0	Barmouth & Dyffryn United
Dolgellau Athletic Amateur	1–2^{1}	Llandudno Town
Holyhead Hotspur	4–0	Technogroup Welshpool
Llandyrnog United	1–5	Flint Town United
Llangefni Town	3–2	Llanfairpwll
Llanidloes Town	1–0	Ruthin Town
Llanrhaeadr ym Mochnant	0–5	Rhyl
Nefyn United	3–2	Tywyn & Bryncrug
Penmaenmawr Phoenix	3–5	Caernarfon Town
Penrhyncoch	2–2 (6–4 pen.)	Guilsfield
Pwllheli	1–6	Gap Connah's Quay
Rhydymwyn	1–4	Buckley Town
Trearddur Bay United	7–3	Penparcau

^{1}Match was played in Llandudno, although Dolgellau was officially the home team.

=== South ===
Team 1	Score	Team 2
Barry Town	3–0	STM Sports
Bettws	0–3	Aberaman Athletic
Bridgend Town	5–3 (a.e.t.)	Monmouth Town
Bryntirion Athletic	0–0 (4–2 pen.)	Cwmbran Celtic
Caerau	1–3	Afan Lido
Cardiff Grange Harlequins	4–2 (a.e.t.)	Bridgend Street
Corus Steel	5–2	Cardiff Corinthians
Croesyceiliog	0–2	Garden Village
Cwmaman Institute	1–2	Taff's Well
Fleur de Lys	1–0	Ely Rangers
Goytre	3–1	Caerau Ely
Goytre United	5–3	Ammanford
Newcastle Emlyn	4–0	South Gower
Penrhiwceiber Rangers	0–2	Cambrian & Clydach Vale
Pontypridd Town	2–0	Pontardawe Town
Treharris Athletic Western	2–1	Pontyclun
UWIC	2–0	Caldicot Town
West End	1–2 (a.e.t.)^{1}	Porth

^{1}Match was postponed until 18 September.

== Second round ==
The draw for the second round was held on 14 September 2010. Games were played on 2 October 2010.

=== North ===
Team 1	Score	Team 2
Caernarfon Town	1–2	Guilsfield
Connah's Quay Town	1–2	Bow Street
Conwy United	1–4	Porthmadog
CPD Gwalchmai	2–2 (4–2 p.)	Buckley Town
Flint Town United	3–4	Llanidloes Town
Gap Connah's Quay	6–1	Bethesda Athletic
Holyhead Hotspur	1–0	Llangefni Town
Nefyn United	1–3	Caersws
Rhos Aelwyd	2–1 (a.e.t.)	Coedpoeth United
Rhyl	2–1	Llandudno Town
Trearddur Bay United	0–7	Cefn Druids

=== South ===
Team 1	Score	Team 2
Afan Lido	1–2	Cambrian & Clydach Vale
Barry Town	1–2 (a.e.t.)	Corus Steel
Garden Village	1–6	Aberaman Athletic
Goytre United	3–1	Fleur de Lys
Cardiff Grange Harlequins	3–0	Treharris Athletic Western
Newcastle Emlyn	1–4	UWIC
Pontypridd Town	1–2	Bryntirion Athletic
Porth	2–0	Goytre
Taff's Well	2–4	Bridgend Town

== Third round ==
The draw for the third round was held on 4 October 2010. The twelve teams competing in the 2010–11 Welsh Premier League entered the competition at this stage. Starting with this round, teams were no longer divided into north and south divisions. Matches were played on 6 November 2010, with the exception of the Airbus UK Broughton/The New Saints match, which took place on 5 November 2010, and the postponed Llanelli/Aberystwyth Town match, which took place on 13 November 2010.

Team 1	Score	Team 2
Aberaman Athletic	0–4	Cefn Druids
Airbus UK Broughton	2–3	The New Saints
Bangor City	2–1	Bryntirion Athletic
Bow Street	2–2 (5–6 p.)	UWIC
Caersws	4–2 (a.e.t.)	Llanidloes Town
Cambrian & Clydach Vale	2–3	Prestatyn Town
Corus Steel	0–2	Cardiff George Harlequins
CPD Gwalchmai	1–4	Port Talbot Town
CPD Porthmadog	0–1	Bala Town
Gap Connah's Quay	5–3 (a.e.t.)	Porth
Goytre United	2–3	Carmarthen Town
Guilsfield	1–2	Rhos Aelwyd
Haverfordwest County	3–2 (a.e.t.)	Holyhead Hotspur
Llanelli AFC	1–0 (a.e.t.)	Aberystwyth Town
Neath	1–1 (6–7 p.)	Rhyl
Newtown	1–2	Bridgend Town

== Fourth round ==
The draw for the fourth round was held on 13 November 2010. Entering this round were the 16 winners from the previous round. The matches were scheduled to take place on 29 January 2011.

Team 1	Score	Team 2
Bangor City	5–3	Haverfordwest County
Carmarthen Town	2-3 (a.e.t.)	Gap Connah's Quay
Cefn Druids	1–4	Llanelli AFC
Port Talbot Town	3–0	Caersws
Cardiff George Harlequins	1–0	Bridgend Town
Rhos Aelwyd	1–6	Prestatyn Town
Rhyl	1–2	The New Saints
UWIC	4–1	Bala Town

== Quarterfinals to Final ==
Quarter-finals
Sat 26 Feb – Port Talbot
Port Talbot Town	0
Bangor City	3
Sat 26 Feb – Connah's Quay
Gap Connah's Quay	4
UWIC Inter Cardiff	0
Sat 5 Mar – Llanelli
Llanelli	1
Prestatyn Town	0
Sat 26 Feb – Oswestry
The New Saints (a.e.t.)	2
Cardiff Grange Harlequins	0

Semi-finals
Sat 9 Apr – Rhyl
Bangor City	1
Gap Connah's Quay	0
Sat 9 Apr – Aberystwyth
Llanelli	1
The New Saints	0

Final
Sun 8 May – Llanelli
Bangor City	1
Llanelli	4
