= 2009–10 Welsh National League (Wrexham Area) =

Welsh National League
- Season: 2009–10

Welsh National League Premier Division
- Champions: Rhos Aelwyd
- Promoted: Rhos Aelwyd
- Relegated: Castell Alun Colts; Borras Park Albion
- Matches played: 182
- Goals scored: 776 (4.26 per match)

Welsh National League Division One
- Champions: Garden Village
- Promoted: Johnstown Youth
- Matches played: 156
- Goals scored: 729 (4.67 per match)

The 2009–10 Welsh National League was the sixty-fifth season of the Welsh National League (Wrexham Area). The Premier Division was won by Rhos Aelwyd, who gained promotion to the Cymru Alliance.

== Premier Division ==
=== League table ===
Pos	Team	Pld	W	D	L	GF	GA	GD	Pts	Promotion or relegation
1	Rhos Aelwyd (C, P)	26	18	6	2	90	38	+52	60	Promotion to 2010–11 Cymru Alliance
2	Chirk AAA	26	18	4	4	74	68	+6	58	
3	Venture Community	26	14	4	8	53	33	+20	46	
4	Corwen Amateurs	26	11	8	7	50	37	+13	41	
5	Castell Alun Colts (R)	26	10	6	10	66	54	+12	36	Relegation to Welsh National League Division One
6	Coedpoeth United	26	10	6	10	57	69	−12	36	
7	Brymbo	26	9	6	11	44	66	−22	33	
8	Overton Recreation	26	9	5	12	44	49	−5	32	
9	Llay Welfare	26	8	6	12	37	55	−18	30	
10	Hawarden Rangers	26	8	5	13	41	58	−17	29	
11	FC Cefn	26	6	9	11	61	71	−10	27	
12	Brickfield Rangers	26	7	5	14	49	63	−14	26	
13	Penycae	26	7	5	14	50	66	−16	26	
14	Borras Park Albion (R)	26	6	7	13	60	79	−19	25	Relegation to Welsh National League Division One

Source: Welsh National League
Rules for classification: 1) points; 2) goal difference; 3) number of goals scored.
(C) Champions; (P) Promoted; (R) Relegated

== Division One ==
=== League table ===
Pos	Team	Pld	W	D	L	GF	GA	GD	Pts	Promotion or qualification
1	Garden Village (C)	24	19	2	3	72	30	+42	59	
2	Johnstown Youth (P)	24	19	1	4	91	39	+52	58	Promotion to Welsh National League Premier Division
3	Communities First	24	15	4	5	87	50	+37	49	
4	New Brighton Villa	24	14	4	6	64	29	+35	46	
5	Acrefair Youth	24	14	3	7	69	43	+26	45	
6	Penyffordd	24	11	6	7	69	51	+18	39	
7	Penley	24	11	4	9	54	44	+10	37	
8	Llanuwchllyn	24	7	6	11	55	57	−2	27	
9	Buckley United	24	6	3	15	36	62	−26	21	
10	Mold Juniors	24	6	2	16	36	67	−31	20	
11	Glyn Ceiriog	24	2	2	20	28	93	−65	8	
12	Holt Nomads	24	3	1	20	27	104	−77	7 (Note: Holt Nomads deducted three points)	
13	Hawkesbury Villa	24	8	4	12	41	60	−19	1 (Note: Hawkesbury Villa deducted 27 points)	

Source: Welsh National League
Rules for classification: 1) points; 2) goal difference; 3) number of goals scored.
(C) Champions; (P) Promoted
