= 1960–61 Welsh Cup =

Tournament details
- Country: Wales

Final positions
- Champions: (Wales) Swansea Town
- Runners-up: (Wales) Bangor City

The 1960–61 FAW Welsh Cup is the 74th season of the annual knockout tournament for competitive football teams in Wales. The final was played at Ninian Park in Cardiff, in front of an attendance of 5,938.

== First round ==
Tie no	Home	Score	Away	Notes
1	Gresford Athletic	5–6	Overton St Mary's	
2	Rhostyllen Villa	2–5	Rhosddu	
3	Ruthin FC	v	Mold Alexandra	Mold Alexandra withdrew
4	Buckley Rovers	2–1	Holt Nomads	
5	Bradley Rangers	3–1	Thomas Marshall SC Wrexham	
6	Brymbo Steelworks	5–3	Corwen Amateurs	
7	Llay Welfare	14–1	Queens Park Rangers (Wrexham)	
8	Newtown	1–0	Caersws Amateurs	
9	Machynlleth	5–2	Llanidloes Town	
10	Llandrindod Wells	2–8	Knighton Town	
11	Towyn	1–0	Dolgellau	
12	Bala Town	2–3	Barmouth & Dyffryn United	
13	Seven Sisters	1–1	3M Gorseinon	Played at Onllwyn
replay	3M Gorseinon	7–2	Seven Sisters	
14	Cwmavon	1–6	Pontardawe Athletic	

== Second round ==
Tie no	Home	Score	Away	Notes
1	Caernarfon Town	2–3	Prestatyn Town	
2	Nantlle Vale	3–0	Penmaenmawr	
3	Holyhead Town	9–2	Nefyn United	
4	Overton St Mary's	3–2	Bradley Rangers	
5	Buckley Rovers	5–0	Denbigh Town	
6	Ruthin FC	1–1	Brymbo Steelworks	
replay	Brymbo Steelworks	3–2	Ruthin FC	
7	Druids United	2–7	Chirk AAA	
8	Rhosddu	3–11	Llay Welfare	
9	Llangollen	0–1	Rhos Aelwyd	
10	Towyn	1–0	Aberystwyth Town	
11	Barmouth & Dyffryn United	v	Builth	Builth dismissed
12	Welshpool	4–5	Knighton Town	
13	Newtown	0–2	Machynlleth	
14	Ebbw Vale	1–0	Morriston Town	
15	Briton Ferry Athletic	1–1	Pembroke Borough	
replay	Pembroke Borough	7–3	Briton Ferry Athletic	
16	3M Gorseinon	0–10	Llanelli	Played at Llanelli
17	Haverfordwest County	1–0	Ton Pentre	
18	Port Talbot Athletic	0–3	Brecon Corinthians	
19	Caerau Athletic	4–5	Pontardawe Athletic	
20	Ferndale Athletic	4–2	Cardiff Corinthians	

== Third round ==
Tie no	Home	Score	Away	Notes
1	Pwllheli & District	2–1	Borough United	
2	Llandudno	5–2	Prestatyn Town	
3	Bethesda Athletic	1–1	Porthmadog	
replay	Porthmadog	v	Bethesda Athletic	Bethesda withdrew
4	Nantlle Vale	1–1	Blaenau Ffestiniog	
replay	Blaenau Ffestiniog	0–4	Nantlle Vale	
5	Holyhead Town	4–1	Holywell Town	
6	Flint Town United	1–0	Colwyn Bay	
7	Buckley Rovers	0–5	Llay Welfare	
8	Rhos Aelwyd	1–1	Chirk AAA	
replay	Chirk AAA	3–0	Rhos Aelwyd	
9	Overton St Mary's	2–0	Brymbo Steelworks	
10	Machynlleth	1–1	Knighton Town	
replay	Knighton Town	4–2	Machynlleth	
11	Towyn	2–1	Barmouth & Dyffryn United	
12	Ferndale Athletic	3–4	Brecon Corinthians	Played at Brecon
13	Llanelli	6–2	Pontardawe Athletic	
14	Haverfordwest County	6–0	Ebbw Vale	
15	Pembroke Borough	1–1	Lovell's Athletic	
replay	Lovell's Athletic	7–1	Pembroke Borough	

== Fourth round ==
Tie no	Home	Score	Away	Notes
1	Porthmadog	3–3	Nantlle Vale	
replay	Nantlle Vale	4–4	Porthmadog	
replay	Porthmadog	2–1	Nantlle Vale	
2	Flint Town United	1–2	Holyhead Town	
3	Llandudno	1–0	Overton St Mary's	
4	Chirk AAA	3–2	Llay Welfare	
5	Rhyl	0–1	Pwllheli & District	
6	Merthyr Tydfil	2–0	Llanelli	
7	Brecon Corinthians	0–1	Lovell's Athletic	
8	Barry Town	2–1	Haverfordwest County	
9	Knighton Town	4–1	Towyn	

== Fifth round ==
Tie no	Home	Score	Away	Notes
1	Chester	2–1	Porthmadog	
2	Llandudno	0–1	Holyhead Town	
3	Chirk AAA	0–8	Bangor City	
4	Pwllheli & District	0–1	Wrexham	
5	Abergavenny Thursdays	1–3	Newport County	
6	Merthyr Tydfil	1–1	Lovell's Athletic	
replay	Lovell's Athletic	3–1	Merthyr Tydfil	
7	Knighton Town	0–16	Cardiff City	Played at Ninian Park
8	Barry Town	0–3	Swansea Town	

== Sixth round ==
Tie no	Home	Score	Away	Notes
1	Bangor City	3–1	Chester	
2	Cardiff City	2–1	Newport County	
3	Swansea Town	5–0	Holyhead Town	
4	Wrexham	2–0	Lovell's Athletic	

== Semi-finals ==
Bangor City	3–0	Wrexham

Bangor

Swansea Town	1–1	Cardiff City

Newport

=== Replay ===
Cardiff City	1–2	Swansea Town

Llanelli

== Final ==
22 April 1961
15:00

Swansea Town	3–1	Bangor City
Reynolds; B. Davies; R. Davies	Report	Ellis

Ninian Park, Cardiff
Attendance: 5,938
Referee: L Callaghan (Merthyr)
