= Welsh National League (Wrexham Area) =

Association football league in Wales

- Founded: 1945
- Folded: 2020
- Country: Wales
- Number of clubs: 26
- Level on pyramid: 3 and 4
- Last champions: Premier Division - Holywell Town; Division One - Hawarden Rangers; Reserves - Mold Alexandra; Reserves & Colts - Connah's Quay Nomads (2019–20)
- Website: League Website

The Welsh National League (Wrexham Area) was a football league in Wales and operated at level 3 and 4 of the Welsh football league system in Flintshire and Wrexham County Borough, but with some teams from Denbighshire (Corwen and Llangollen Town) and Gwynedd (Llanuwchllyn). For sponsorship purposes it was last known as the Guy Walmsley & Co Welsh National League.

== History ==
The League grew out of the Wrexham and District League which ran during the early years of the twentieth century. At that time the senior clubs in the Wrexham area played in English leagues such as The Combination and the Birmingham & District League. Their reserve sides, along with local amateur teams, contested the Wrexham and District League (1903–1912). The Wrexham and District League folded in 1912 and its clubs joined the North Wales Alliance League.

In the inter-war years, the new Welsh National League with its various sections was organised. Clubs from the Wrexham area, and the rest of North Wales, joined the Welsh National League Northern Section which ran from 1921–1930.

Teams from the Wrexham Area competed in the Wrexham and District League (1925–1939).

After World War II they re-organised as the Welsh National League (Wrexham Area).

At the end of the 2019–20 season the league folded as part of the reorganisation on the Welsh football pyramid, with the Football Association of Wales taking over running tier 3 leagues and local football associations tier 4.

== Member clubs for the final 2019–20 season ==
Locations of teams in the Welsh National League Premier Division, 2019–20 season
Locations of teams in the Welsh National League Premier Division, 2019–20 season

Club	Ground	Town
Premier Division
Brickfield Rangers	Clywedog Park	Wrexham
Brymbo	Brymbo Sports Complex	Broughton
Castell Alun Colts	Castell Alun Sports & Leisure Complex	Hope
Cefn Albion	The Myga, Cefn Mawr	Cefn
Chirk Amateur Athletic Association	Holyhead Road	Chirk
FC Queens Park	The Dunks	Caia Park
Holywell Town	Halkyn Road	Holywell
Llanuwchllyn	Church Street	Llanuwchllyn
Llay Welfare	The Ring	Llay
Mold Alexandra	Alyn Park	Mold
Penycae	Afoneitha Road	Penycae
Plas Madoc (club folded July 2020 after end of season)	The Myga, Cefn Mawr	Cefn Mawr
Rhos Aelwyd	Ponciau Park, Ponciau	Rhosllanerchrugog
Rhostyllen	Parish Hall	Rhostyllen
Saltney Town	Saltney Community Centre	Saltney
Rhydymwyn	Vicarage Road	Rhydymwyn
Division One
Cefn Mawr Rangers	The Myga, Cefn Mawr	Cefn Mawr
Coedpoeth United	Penygelli Playing Fields	Coedpoeth
Halkyn & Flint Mountain	Pant Newydd	Pentre Halkyn
Hawarden Rangers	Gladstone Playing Field	Hawarden
Johnstown Youth	Moreton Playing Fields	Johnstown
Lex XI	Stansty Park	Summerhill
Llangollen Town	Tower Fields	Llangollen
Mynydd Isa Spartans	Argoed	Mynydd Isa
New Brighton Villa	New Brighton Community Centre	New Brighton
Overton Recreation	Recreation Ground	Overton-on-Dee
Rhosllanerchrugog (resigned from league in December 2019)	Rhos Rugby Club	Rhosllanerchrugog

== Divisional Champions ==
The league underwent various restructures in its history, with the number of divisions and their names changing.

For its first season the league had just one division, the Senior Division.

Season	Senior Division
1945–46	Llay United

In 1946 two regional divisions were introduced below the Senior Division.

Season	Senior Division	East Division	West Division
1946–47	Wrexham 'A'	Gresford Athletic	Rhostyllen Sports Club
1947–48	Chirk AAA	Rhostyllen/Bersham BL	Coedpoeth
1948–49	Johnstown United	Overton St Mary's	Coedpoeth

In 1949 the regionalised divisions were merged and the resulting three divisions renamed Divisions One, Two and Three.

Season	Division One	Division Two	Division Three
1949–50	Chirk AAA	Ruabon Athletic	New Boughton
1950–51	Druids United	Penycae	Rubery Owen Rockwell
1951–52	Chirk AAA	Holt Nomads	Royal Pioneer Corps
1952–53	Overton St Mary's	Llangollen Town	Bradley Rangers

In 1953–54 Division Three was not contested due to a lack of clubs.

Season	Division One	Division Two
1953–54	Overton St Mary's	Bradley Rangers

In 1954 Division Three was revived.

Season	Division One	Division Two	Division Three
1954–55	Welshpool	Gresford Colliery	Bradley Rangers Reserves
1955–56	Buckley Wanderers	Holt Nomads	Tanyfron Youth Club
1956–57	Welshpool	Rubery Owen Rockwell	Ponciau Youth Club
1957–58	Brymbo Steelworks	Royal Pioneer Corps	Marshalls Sports Club
1958–59	Chirk AAA	Rhos Aelwyd	Tanyfron
1959–60	Chirk AAA	Buckley Rovers	Fron

In 1960 Division Three was discontinued once again.

Season	Division One	Division Two
1960–61	Chirk AAA	Pentre Broughton
1961–62	Welshpool	Rhosddu

In 1962 Division Three was revived once again.

Season	Division One	Division Two	Division Three
1962–63	Llay Welfare	Gresford Athletic	Summerhill
1963–64	Ruthin Town	Summerhill	Llanuwchllyn
1964–65	Welshpool	Buckley Rovers	Coedpoeth Sports Club
1965–66	Brymbo Steelworks	Rubery Owen Rockwell	Marshalls Sports Club
1966–67	Brymbo Steelworks	Coedpoeth Sports Club	British Celanese
1967–68	Llangollen Town	Bala Town	Rossett Villa
1968–69	Brymbo Steelworks	Rossett Villa	Burntwood & Drury

In 1969 Division Three was split into two sections, A and B.

Season	Division One	Division Two	Division Three A	Division Three B
1969–70	Brymbo Steelworks	Druids United	Gresford Athletic Reserves	Cefn Albion

In 1970 the two Division Three sections were reorganised into Divisions Three and Four.

Season	Division One	Division Two	Division Three	Division Four
1970–71	Brymbo Steelworks	Burntwood & Drury	Rhosddu	Castell Alun
1971–72	Llangollen Town	Rhosddu	Castell Alun	Druids United Reserves
1972–73	Denbigh Town	Ruabon St Marys	Hawarden Rangers	Treuddyn Villa
1973–74	Denbigh Town	Buckley Rovers	Coedpoeth Sports Club	Overton Athletic

In 1974 the four divisions were reduced to just two.

Season	Division One	Division Two
1974–75	Denbigh Town	Lex XI

In 1975 Division Three was reintroduced.

Season	Division One	Division Two	Division Three
1975–76	Denbigh Town	Coedpoeth Sports Club	Castell Alun Colts

In 1976 Division Three was discontinued once again.

Season	Division One	Division Two
1976–77	Brymbo Steelworks	Castell Alun Colts
1977–78	New Broughton	Cefn Albion

In 1978 Divisions Three and Four were revived.

Season	Division One	Division Two	Division Three	Division Four
1978–79	Brymbo Steelworks	Chirk AAA	Penley	Tunnel Cement

In 1979 Division Four was discontinued once again.

Season	Division One	Division Two	Division Three
1979–80	Cefn Albion	Ruthin Town	Grapes

NB: The NW Sport site disagrees that Division Four was not in operation for season 1979-80, and gives the four divisional winners as Cefn Albion, Ruthin Town, Ruthin Town Reserves, and Grapes, respectively.

In 1980 Division Four was once again revived.

Season	Division One	Division Two	Division Three	Division Four
1980–81	Cefn Albion	Rhostyllen Villa	Grapes	New Broughton
1981–82	Brymbo Steelworks	Grapes	Hawkesbury Villa	Coedpoeth
1982–83	Brymbo Steelworks	Rhos Aelwyd	Coedpoeth	Llay RBL

In 1983 Division Four was split into two sections, North and South.

Season	Division One	Division Two	Division Three	Division Four (North)	Division Four (South)
1983–84	Chirk AAA	Lex XI Reserves	Penycae	Connah's Quay Reserves	Johnstown Athletic

In 1984 the two Division Four sections were merged back and the four divisions renamed Premier, One, Two and Three.

Season	Premier Division	Division One	Division Two	Division Three
1984–85	Lex XI	Llay RBL	Chirk AAA Reserves	Llangollen Town Reserves
1985–86	Mold Alexandra	Llangollen Town	Penycae Reserves	Bradley
1986–87	Mold Alexandra	Llay Welfare	Corwen	Flint Town
1987–88	Lex XI	Corwen	St Marys Ruabon	New Broughton
1988–89	Lex XI	Rhostyllen Villa	Marchwiel Villa	Kelloggs
1989–90	Mold Alexandra	Bala Town	New Broughton	Kinnerton

In 1990 Division Three was discontinued.

Season	Premier Division	Division One	Division Two
1990–91	Marchwiel Villa	Llay Welfare	Bradley
1991–92	Wrexham Reserves	Treuddyn Villa	British Aerospace
1992–93	Penley	Cefn Druids Reserves	Rhostyllen/Bersham
1993–94	Penycae	Brymbo Reserves	Rhosddu
1994–95	Oswestry Town	Rhostyllen/Bersham RBL	Wrexham Colts
1995–96	Gresford Athletic	Wrexham Colts	Gresford Athletic Colts
1996–97	Wrexham Colts	Castell AC	Owens Corning
1997–98	Penley	Bala Town	Bradley Villa
1998–99	Corwen	Bradley Villa	Borras Park Albion

In 1999 Division Three was revived.

Season	Premier Division	Division One	Division Two	Division Three
1999–2000	British Aerospace	Hand Hotel	Cefn United	Buckley Town
2000–01	Gresford Athletic	Cefn United	Llay Welfare Colts	Queen's Park
2001–02	Mold Alexandra	Mynydd Isa	Queen's Park	Brynteg Village
2002–03	Castell Alun Colts	Queen's Park	Brynteg Village	Ruabon Villa
2003–04	Bala Town	Acrefair Youth	Coedpoeth United	Buckley Town Reserves
2004–05	Queen's Park	Brynteg Village	New Brighton FC	Mold Juniors
2005–06	Rhos Aelwyd	Castell Alun Colts	Bala Town Reserves	Venture Community
2006–07	Brymbo	Bala Town Reserves	Venture Community	Brymbo Reserves
2007–08	Brymbo	Airbus UK Reserves	Garden Village	FC Cefn

In 2008, all reserve and colts teams were split off, leaving two divisions for first teams and two divisions for lower teams.

Season	Premier Division	Division One	Reserves Division	Reserves & Colts Division
2008–09	Llangollen Town	FC Cefn	Bala Town	Castell AC
2009–10	Rhos Aelwyd	Garden Village	Airbus UK	Ruthin Town
2010–11	Penycae	Penyffordd	Rhos Aelwyd	Airbus UK
2011–12	FC Cefn	Saltney Town	Chirk AAA	Mold Alex
2012–13	Chirk AAA	Borras Park Albion	Ruthin Town	Buckley Town
2013–14	Mold Alexandra	FC Nomads of Connah's Quay	Penycae	FC Nomads of Connah's Quay
2014–15	Gresford Athletic	FC Queens Park	Cefn Druids	Mold Alex
2015–16	FC Nomads of Connah's Quay	Cefn Albion	Mold Alex	Saltney Town
2016–17	FC Queens Park	Lex Glyndwr	Cefn Druids	Flint Town United
2017-18	Buckley Town	Brymbo	Ruthin Town	Brickfield Rangers
2018-19	Corwen	Plas Madoc	Cefn Druids	Holywell Town FC
2019-20	Holywell Town	Hawarden Rangers	Mold Alexandra	Connah's Quay Nomads

== See also ==
- Football in Wales
- Welsh football league system
- Welsh Cup
- List of football clubs in Wales
- List of stadiums in Wales by capacity
