= Rhosllanerchrugog F.C. (2017) =

Former association football club in Wales

Rhosllanerchrugog
- Full name: Rhosllanerchrugog Football Club
- Nickname: Wasps
- Founded: 2017
- Dissolved: 2019
- Ground: Rhos Rugby Club
- League: Welsh National League (Wrexham Area) (resigned in December 2019)
Home colours

Rhosllanerchrugog F.C. was a Welsh football team from the village of Rhosllanerchrugog, Wrexham.

In June 2019, the Welsh pop-punk band Neck Deep were to become the main shirt sponsor of the club.

In December 2019 the club resigned from the league, effectively merging with Johnstown Youth.

== League history ==
Season	League	Played	Won	Drew	Lost	Goals For	Goals Against	Points	Position	Notes
2017–18	North East Wales League	26	12	3	11	77	56	39	8th of 14	Promoted due to vacancy
2018–19	Welsh National League (Wrexham Area) Division One	22	11	3	8	37	41	36	5th of 12	
2019–20	Welsh National League (Wrexham Area) Division One								N/A	Resigned mid-season, record expunged

== Cup history ==
Season	Competition	Round	Opposition	Score	Notes
2017–18	Welsh Cup	First Qualifying Round	Mynydd Isa Spartans	3–1	
2017–18	Welsh Cup	Second Qualifying Round	Penyffordd	2–3	
2017–18	FAW Trophy	Round 1	Offa Athletic	2–0	
2017–18	FAW Trophy	Round 2	Corwen	0–6	
2018–19	Welsh Cup	First Qualifying Round	Rhos Aelwyd	0–4	
2018–19	FAW Trophy	Round 2	Chirk AAA	1–8	

== See also ==
- Rhosllanerchrugog F.C. (1889), 19th century team with the same name
