= Mike Keen (footballer, born 1953) =

Welsh footballer

Personal information
- Full name: Michael Andrew Charles Keen
- Date of birth: 12 February 1963 (age 63)
- Place of birth: Wrexham, Wales
- Position: Goalkeeper

Senior career*
Years	Team	Apps	(Gls)
	Chester City	0	(0)
- Lex XI
1985–1986	Wrexham	5	(0)
- Lex XI
- * Club domestic league appearances and goals

Michael Andrew Charles Keen (born 12 February 1963) is a Welsh former footballer who played as a goalkeeper. He made appearances in the English Football League under non-contract terms with Wrexham.
