= Plas Madoc F.C. =

Former association football club in Wales

Plas Madoc
- Full name: Plas Madoc Football Club
- Nickname: Plassey
- Founded: 2017
- Dissolved: 2020; 6 years ago
- Ground: The Muga; Cefn Mawr
- Manager: Ryan Roberts
- League: Welsh National League Premier Division
- 2019–20: Welsh National League Premier Division, 12th
Home colours

Plas Madoc Football Club was a Welsh football club from Plas Madoc, Wrexham County Borough, Wales, The club was founded in 2017 and played in the Welsh National League Premier Division. On 14 July 2020, an announcement via Twitter confirmed the club had folded.

In 2023, the club re-emerged under a new alias in the area therefore "FC Plas Madoc" was founded

== History ==
A club by the name of Plasmadoc FC was formed in 1874, and through a series of mergers between various local teams is claimed to be an ancestor of the modern Cefn Druids team who formed in 1992.

The team began playing in the 2017–18 season in the North East Wales League, a competition which it won.

The following season, the team achieved second consecutive promotion when it won the Welsh National League Division One.

== Seasons ==
| Season | League | | | | | | | | | | | Welsh Cup | FAW Trophy | Other |
| Season | Tier | Division | P | W | D | L | F | A | Pts | PPG | Pos | Welsh Cup | FAW Trophy | Other |
|---|---|---|---|---|---|---|---|---|---|---|---|---|---|---|
| 2017-18 | 5 | North East Wales League | 26 | 23 | 0 | 3 | 130 | 36 | 69 | | 1 | | R2 | |
| 2018-19 | 4 | Welsh National League (Wrexham Area) Division One | 22 | 20 | 2 | 0 | 106 | 26 | 62 | | 1 | QR1 | QF | Welsh National League Division One League Cup Winners |
| 2019-20 | 3 | Welsh National League (Wrexham Area) Premier Division | 17 | 4 | 6 | 7 | 24 | 44 | 18 | 1.06 | 12 | QR2 | R2 | |

== Honours ==
=== League ===
- Welsh National League (Wrexham Area) Division One

Winner (1): 2019

- North East Wales Football League

Winner (1): 2018
