= Coedpoeth United F.C. =

Association football club in Wales

Coedpoeth United
- Full name: Coedpoeth United Football Club
- Founded: 1999; 1899 name first used
- Ground: "The Crick"; Brymbo Sports & Social Complex; Tanyfron; Wrexham County Borough
- Capacity: 1,000
- Chairman: Mark Hughes
- Manager: Jack Pawley
- League: North East Wales Division One
- 2025–26: North East Wales Division One, 5th of 12
Home colours	Away colours

Coedpoeth United Football Club is a football club based in Coedpoeth, Wrexham County Borough. They play in the North East Wales Division One.

The first team currently ground share with Brymbo F.C. at Brymbo Sports & Social Complex. The reserves play in Coedpoeth at Penygelli Playing Fields. As at start of 2024-25 season, the club is now up to 21 teams and over 300 registered players and has achieved the Silver Accreditation award.

== Early history ==
The first football club in Coedpoeth was Lloftwen, of whom there are reports in January 1878. The next club in the village was Equitable formed around 1880, and folded around 1884. Equitable entered the Welsh Cup in 1881. A club called Coedpoeth also existed at the same time and competed in the Welsh Cup from 1882 to 1884. Given that both these clubs seem to have appeared and disappeared at the same time, it is possible that they were the same club, using interchangeable names depending on the reporter.

In 1883-84 there are reports of a team called White Stars (Coedpoeth) who played near the City Arms in Minera. In 1887 there are reports of a team called North End (Coedpoeth) who played at a ground called The Terrace.

The short-lived Minera Rovers and Minera Victoria (named for a neighbouring village) contested the Welsh Amateur Cup in 1890 and 1891. By 1892 Adwy United had emerged to represent the area. Adwy United reached the semi-final of the Welsh Amateur Cup in 1895. By 1898 they were joined in the Denbighshire League by another local team, Minera St Marys. Minera St Marys only lasted one season in this competition, taking on the fixtures of Cerney Swifts and finishing second from bottom.

Adwy United were more competitive in the Denbighshire League, finishing third in 1899. They also won the St Martins Cup, beating St Martins 5–0 at The Racecourse, Wrexham. There are reports of Adwy United playing in "the same coloured jerseys" as Chirk. Whilst this does not provide a definite answer on what colours Adwy United wore, it is documented that Chirk played in white and blue.

Adwy United withdrew from the Denbighshire League in 1900 and merged with Coedpoeth Victoria to form Adwy Victoria. This team finished second in the Denbighshire League in 1901.

Coedpoeth United were first mentioned in 1907 when they joined the Wrexham & District League. They finished second in the Second Division and were promoted to the First Division for the 1908–09 season, when they finished third. The 1908–09 season also saw the introduction of a Coedpoeth United Reserves team in the Second Division, who were joined in the league by another team from the village, Coedpoeth St Davids. In 1909 the team also reached the final of the Denbighshire & Flintshire Charity Cup, and St Martins Cup. Coedpoeth United withdrew from the Wrexham & District League in 1910.

This is the last record of any football teams in Coedpoeth prior to World War One.

=== Seasons ===
Season	Club	League									Welsh Cup	Welsh Amateur Cup	Other
Season	Club	Division	P	W	D	L	F	A	Pts	Pos	Welsh Cup	Welsh Amateur Cup	Other
1881–82	Equitable (Coedpoeth)										1R		
1882–83	Coedpoeth										1R		
1883–84	Coedpoeth										1R		
1890–91	Minera Rovers											1R	
1891–92	Minera Victoria											1R	
1892–93	Adwy United											1R	
1893–94	Adwy United											1R	
1894–95	Adwy United											SF	
1895–96	Adwy United											1R	
1896–97	Adwy United											3R	
1897–98	Adwy United	Denbighshire League	11	2	4	5	16	26	8	5		1R	
1897–98	Bwlchgwyn Albion											1R	
1898–99	Adwy United	Denbighshire League	16	10	1	5	57	30	21	3		2R	St Martins Cup Winners
1898–99	Bwlchgwyn Albion											1R	
1898–99	Minera St Marys	Denbighshire League	16	4	1	11	23	62	9	9		PR	
1899–1900	Adwy United	Denbighshire League	Withdrew									2R	
1899–1900	Coedpoeth Victoria											2R	
1900–01	Adwy Victoria United	Denbighshire League	12	8	2	2	38	20	18	2		3R	
1901–02	Adwy Victoria	Denbighshire League	9	3	2	4	13	31	8	5		1R	
1907–08	Coedpoeth United	Wrexham & District League Division 2	22	16	2	4	93	32	34	2		2R	Denbighshire & Flintshire Charity Cup Semi Final
1908–09	Coedpoeth United	Wrexham & District League Div 1	20	15	0	5	63	33	30	3		1R	Denbighshire & Flintshire Charity Cup Runner Up. St Martins Cup Runner Up.
1908–09	Coedpoeth St Davids	Wrexham & District League Div 2	14	6	1	7	27	17	13	6		PR	
1909–10	Coedpoeth United	Wrexham & District League Div 1	Withdrew								1R	PR	

Champions	Runners-up	Promoted	Relegated

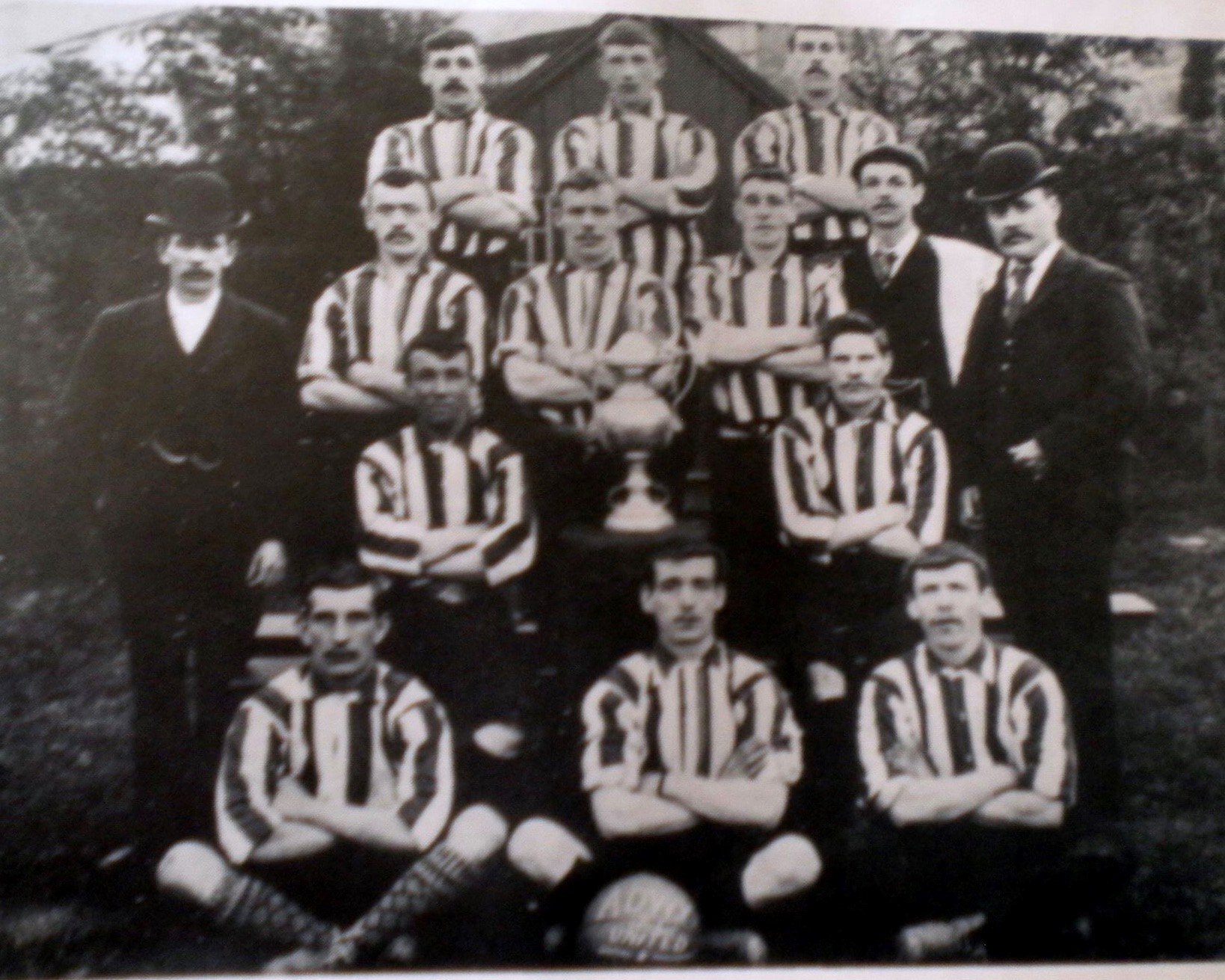
Adwy United 1899 with the St Martins Cup

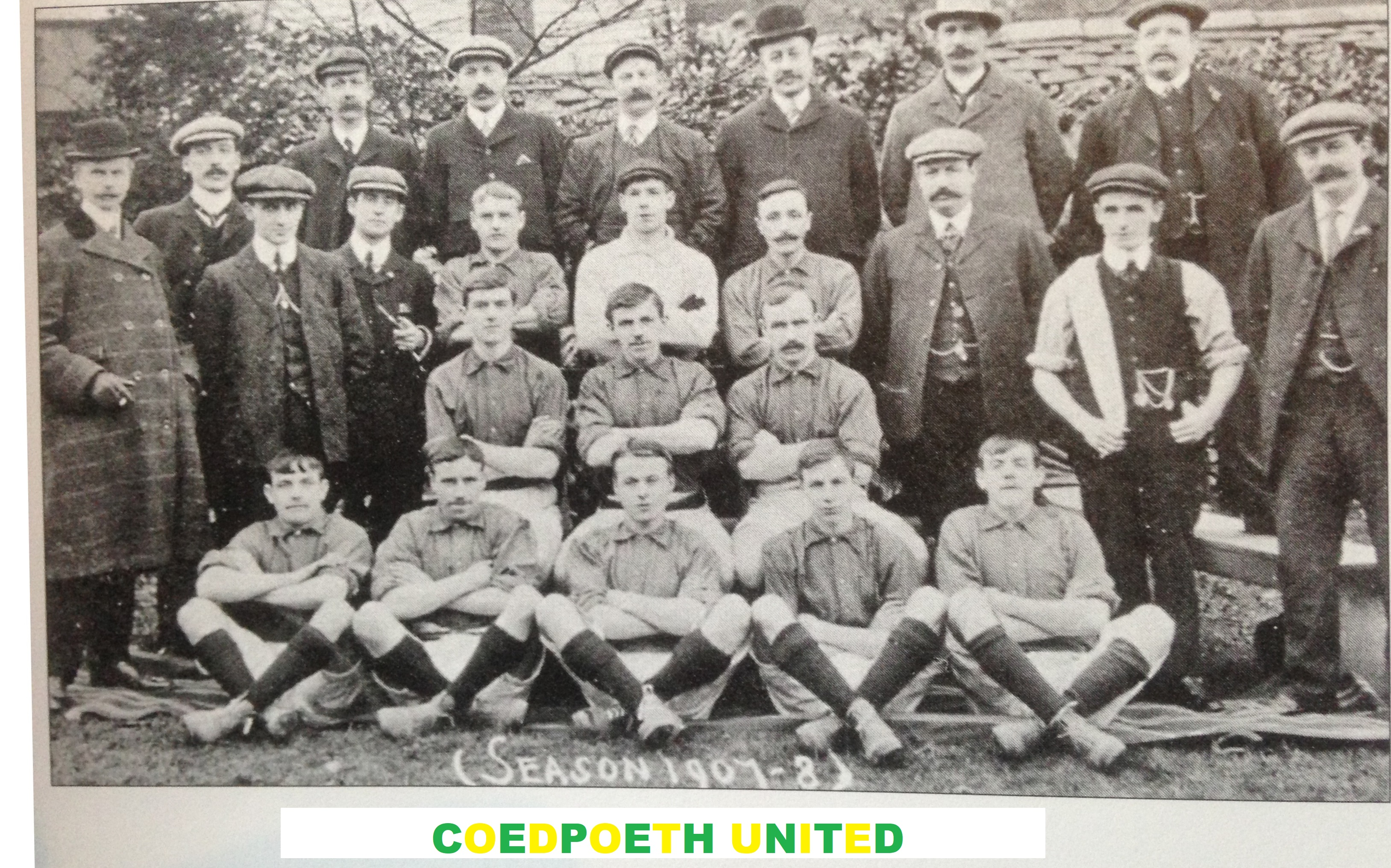
Coedpoeth United 1907–08

== Inter-war period ==
Following the end of hostilities Adwy White Stars competed for one season in the 1919-20 Ffrith & District League, a league in which Coedpoeth Athletic competed in the following season. Coedpoeth United re-emerged in 1920 in the North Wales Alliance League Division 2, a competition in which they finished as runners up, only missing out on being champions on goals scored. From 1921 to 1924 Coedpoeth entered the newly formed Welsh National League (North). Between 1935 and 1938 the club competed in the Wrexham & District League.

=== Seasons ===
Season	Club	League									Welsh Cup
Season	Club	Division	P	W	D	L	F	A	Pts	Pos	Welsh Cup
1920–21	Coedpoeth United	North Wales Alliance League Division 2	20	16	2	2	67	21	34	2	1PR
1921–22	Coedpoeth United	Welsh National League North Division 2 East	28	12	6	10	59	48	30	7	2PR
1922–23	Coedpoeth United	Welsh National League North Division 2 East	22	7	5	10	53	57	19	8	3R
1935–36	Coedpoeth United	Wrexham & District League	27	9	4	14	52	64	22	9	1R
1936–37	Coedpoeth United	Wrexham & District League	18	7	4	7	44	53	18	10	3R
1937–38	Coedpoeth United	Wrexham & District League	24	4	2	18	31	91	10	13	1R

Champions	Runners-up	Promoted	Relegated

== Post War Period ==
Following the end of World War II, Coedpoeth re-emerged in the newly formed Welsh National League Wrexham Area East. They were Champions of the East Division in 1948 and 1949. The 1949 League winning team had a 100% record, and was promoted to Welsh National League Wrexham Area Division 1. The club stayed in Division 1 for two seasons, before being relegated in 1951. The club finished as Runners Up in Division 2 in 1953 achieving Promotion back to Division 1. The team was immediately relegated again, and played a final season in Division 2 before folding at the end of the 1955 season.

=== Seasons ===
Season	Club	League									Welsh Cup
Season	Club	Division	P	W	D	L	F	A	Pts	Pos	Welsh Cup
1946–47	Coedpoeth United	Welsh National League Wrexham Area East	22	10	3	9	68	60	23	7	
1947–48	Coedpoeth United	Welsh National League Wrexham Area East	20	15	1	4	75	29	31	1	
1948–49	Coedpoeth United	Welsh National League Wrexham Area East	20	20	0	0	90	12	40	1	
1949–50	Coedpoeth United	Welsh National League Wrexham Area Division 1	32	12	6	14	69	70	30	9	1R
1950–51	Coedpoeth United	Welsh National League Wrexham Area Division 1	29	5	3	21	51	112	13	16	1R
1951–52	Coedpoeth United	Welsh National League Wrexham Area Division 2	28	15	3	10	80	56	33	4	1R
1952–53	Coedpoeth United	Welsh National League Wrexham Area Division 2	29	23	3	3	117	38	49	2	1R
1953–54	Coedpoeth United	Welsh National League Wrexham Area Division 1	30	5	4	21	21	43	14	15	3R
1954–55	Coedpoeth United	Welsh National League Wrexham Area Division 2	26	11	2	13	96	101	24	8	1R

Champions	Runners-up	Promoted	Relegated

== Coedpoeth Sports Club FC ==
Coedpoeth Sports Club
- Full name: Coedpoeth Sports Club Football Club
- Founded: 1964
- Dissolved: 1977
- Manager: Bob Squire
- 1976–77: Welsh National League Division 1, 10th

In 1964, almost a decade after the previous Coedpoeth team had folded, Coedpoeth Sports Club entered Welsh National League Wrexham Area Division 3. Managed by Councillor Bob Squire, Coedpoeth SC were immediately successful and were champions in their first season, gaining promotion to Division 2. Their stay in Division 2 lasted two seasons; in 1967 they were champions and promoted again. The club lasted five seasons in Division 1 before finishing 15th in 1972 and dropping two tiers back to Division 3. The club initially struggled back in Division 3, however in 1974 Coedpoeth SC were champions and promoted. 1976 saw the club complete a League and Cup double as they won Division 2 alongside the Horace Wynne Cup. The club finished 10th back in Division 1, however the club folded once again in 1977 after being knocked out of the Welsh Cup in the qualifying round.

=== Seasons ===
Season	Club	League									Welsh Cup	Other
Season	Club	Division	P	W	D	L	F	A	Pts	Pos	Welsh Cup	Other
1964–65	Coedpoeth Sports Club	Welsh National League Wrexham Area Division 3	28	19	4	5	121	44	42	1		
1965–66	Coedpoeth Sports Club	Welsh National League Wrexham Area Division 2	26	19	2	5	91	44	40	3		
1966–67	Coedpoeth Sports Club	Welsh National League Wrexham Area Division 2	28	21	5	2	119	37	45*	1	2R	
1967–68	Coedpoeth Sports Club	Welsh National League Wrexham Area Division 1	30	6	3	21	46	96	15	15	1R	
1968–69	Coedpoeth Sports Club	Welsh National League Wrexham Area Division 1	29	11	6	12	51	55	28	8	2R	
1969–70	Coedpoeth Sports Club	Welsh National League Wrexham Area Division 1	30	13	3	14	60	46	29	9	2R	
1970–71	Coedpoeth Sports Club	Welsh National League Wrexham Area Division 1	30	7	8	15	52	69	22	12	3R	
1971–72	Coedpoeth Sports Club	Welsh National League Wrexham Area Division 1	30	5	5	20	27	70	15	15	2R	
1972–73	Coedpoeth Sports Club	Welsh National League Wrexham Area Division 3	26	6	2	18	49	119	14	13		
1973–74	Coedpoeth Sports Club	Welsh National League Wrexham Area Division 3	25	18	5	2	79	32	41	1		
1974–75	Coedpoeth Sports Club	Welsh National League Wrexham Area Division 2	28	13	4	11	86	69	30	9		
1975–76	Coedpoeth Sports Club	Welsh National League Wrexham Area Division 2	30	23	4	3	92	31	50	1		Horace Wynne Cup Winners
1976–77	Coedpoeth Sports Club	Welsh National League Wrexham Area Division 1	30	11	6	13	45	47	28	10	QR	
1977–78	Coedpoeth Sports Club										QR	

Champions	Runners-up	Promoted	Relegated

== 1980s ==
Coedpoeth once again reformed for the start of the 1980–81 season and finished second in Welsh National League Wrexham Area Division 4, but were not promoted. The following season the club were champions of Division 4. This marked the beginning of an astonishing rise, as the club claimed the Division 3 title at its first attempt, and finished as Division 2 runners-up straight away too. The club finished 13th in its first season in Division 1 and was subsequently relegated. In 1985 the club was managed by former Wrexham, Liverpool and Chester player Stuart Mason. The club remained in Division 2 before folding in 1989.

=== Seasons ===
Season	Club	League									Welsh Cup	Other
Season	Club	Division	P	W	D	L	F	A	Pts	Pos	Welsh Cup	Other
1980–81	Coedpoeth	Welsh National League Wrexham Area Division 4	28	19	4	5	93	52	42	2		
1981–82	Coedpoeth	Welsh National League Wrexham Area Division 4	30	27	0	3	131	22	54	1		
1982–83	Coedpoeth	Welsh National League Wrexham Area Division 3	30	27	2	1	123	41	56	1		
1983–84	Coedpoeth	Welsh National League Wrexham Area Division 2	28	21	4	3	100	32	46	2		
1984–85	Coedpoeth	Welsh National League Wrexham Area Division 1	30	9	5	16	43	69	23	13		
1986–87	Coedpoeth	Welsh National League Wrexham Area Division 2	30	16	4	10	93	57	45	5		
1987–88	Coedpoeth	Welsh National League Wrexham Area Division 2	30	8	4	18	55	86	28	12		
1988–89	Coedpoeth	Welsh National League Wrexham Area Division 2	26	11	2	13	61	66	35	9		

Champions	Runners-up	Promoted	Relegated

== Recent history ==
The current Adult section of the club reformed in 1999 and joined the Welsh National League.

Steve Wilk took over as manager from Steve Jones at the start of the 2011–12 season. They finished up 3rd in the league in his first season in charge. In 2012–13, the club reached its first senior cup final for many years, losing 1–0 in the WNL Premier Division final to local rivals, Brymbo at Cefn Druids. Coedpoeth United FC finished in 8th place in the league in the season ended 2012–13.

Steve Wilk remained in charge for the start of the 2013–14 season assembling arguably the strongest squad on paper they had for many years. After a tough first round of games, with only one point on the board after 6 games, Steve Wilk resigned. Steve Jones stepped back into management (after a brief unhappy spell at Brymbo) to bring the team up to finish away from the relegation zone in 11th place.

Dur to new work commitments, Steve Jones was unable to continue as manager for the start of the 2014–15 season and so long serving player John Griffiths stepped in to become player/manager with Andy Pryde as his player assistant.

The 2015–16 season saw the appointment of former Everton, Wrexham and Wales international Dave Smallman as manager, however Smallman left after only a few games and was replaced by long time player, and reserves coach Karl Fenlon.

== Post Covid (2021–2026) ==
Following the formation of the North East Wales Football League in 2020, Coedpoeth United continued to compete in the league structure while focusing on rebuilding the club both on and off the field. Alongside improvements to the senior playing squad, the club invested in developing its youth pathway and strengthening its community presence.

During the early 2020s, Coedpoeth expanded its football provision, establishing a clear development pathway from junior football into the senior game. By the 2025–26 season, the club had over 300 players and volunteers across teams ranging from Under-7 level through to senior football.

A significant milestone came during the 2024–25 season when the club's Under-19 side completed an unbeaten league campaign, winning the league title. The entire squad committed to the club for the following season, with a number of players progressing into the senior setup as part of Coedpoeth United's long-term player development strategy.

Ahead of the 2025–26 season, former club captain Jack Pawley was appointed first-team manager after spending almost a decade as a player with the club. He succeeded Wayne Jones, who stepped down from first-team management due to personal reasons. Pawley was joined by Carl "Paddy" Partington, Aaron Camplin and Adam Taylor as part of the coaching staff. The side finished 5th in the North East Wales Football League Division One, and reached the league cup final, losing 3-2 to FC Queens Park.

== Seasons ==
For a full history see; List of football seasons involving Coedpoeth and Minera teams

Season	League										Welsh Cup	FAW Trophy	Other
Season	Tier	Division	P	W	D	L	F	A	Pts	Pos	Welsh Cup	FAW Trophy	Other
1999-2000	5	Welsh National League Wrexham Area Division 2	30	19	2	9	117	70	59	4			
2000-01	5	Welsh National League Wrexham Area Division 2	26	8	3	15	69	85	24*	12			
2001-02	5	Welsh National League Wrexham Area Division 2	26	6	4	16	41	79	22	11			
2002-03	5	Welsh National League Wrexham Area Division 2	24	14	5	5	79	43	48	4			
2003-04	5	Welsh National League Wrexham Area Division 2	28	23	4	1	92	16	73	1			
2004-05	4	Welsh National League Wrexham Area Division 1	26	18	5	3	79	43	59	3		QF	
2005-06	3	Welsh National League Wrexham Area Premier Division	32	12	8	12	63	65	44	8	1R	3R	
2006-07	3	Welsh National League Wrexham Area Premier Division	30	9	10	11	57	59	37	8	1R	QF	
2007-08	3	Welsh National League Wrexham Area Premier Division	30	11	3	16	65	71	33*	12	1R	4R	
2008-09	3	Welsh National League Wrexham Area Premier Division	28	16	5	7	77	39	53	5	1R	2R	Horace Wynne Cup Runner Up
2009-10	3	Welsh National League Wrexham Area Premier Division	26	10	6	10	57	69	36	6	3R	2R	
2010-11	3	Welsh National League Wrexham Area Premier Division	30	18	6	6	84	56	60	3	2R	4R	
2011-12	3	Welsh National League Wrexham Area Premier Division	30	11	3	16	65	74	36	11	2R	2R	
2012-13	3	Welsh National League Wrexham Area Premier Division	28	10	8	10	55	54	38	8	1R	2R	Welsh National League Premier Division League Cup Runner Up
2013-14	3	Welsh National League Wrexham Area Premier Division	30	8	8	14	61	77	32	12	1R	2R	
2014-15	3	Welsh National League Wrexham Area Premier Division	30	10	4	16	46	75	34	9	1R	3R	
2015-16	3	Welsh National League Wrexham Area Premier Division	26	1	1	24	21	111	4	14	1QR	2R	
2016-17	3	Welsh National League Wrexham Area Premier Division	26	5	3	18	34	90	18	12	1R	2R	
2017-18	3	Welsh National League Wrexham Area Premier Division	28	0	3	25	25	127	3	15	2QR	3R	
2018-19	4	Welsh National League Wrexham Area Division 1	22	11	2	8	48	53	36	6	1R	2R	Welsh National League Division 1 League Cup Semi Final
2019-20	4	Welsh National League Wrexham Area Division 1	10	6	3	1	37	16	21 (2.10 ppg)	3	1R	3R	
2021-22	4	North East Wales Football League Premier Division	22	5	7	10	45	54	22	10	1R	2R	Horace Wynne Cup R4
2022-23	4	North East Wales Football League Premier Division	18	4	3	11	23	38	15	9	1QR	1R	
2023-24	4	North East Wales Football League Premier Division	22	5	7	10	35	52	22	11	Not Entered	Not Entered	Mike Beech Memorial Cup Semi Final
2024-25	4	North East Wales Football League Premier Division	22	13	5	4	56	37	44	4	Not Entered	1R	
2025-26	4	North East Wales Football League Division 1	22	9	5	8	54	42	39	5	2QR	1QR	NE Wales Premier Cup Runner Up

The club joined the newly formed North East Wales Football League in 2020 as a Premier Division club.

== Honours ==
=== League ===
- Welsh National League Premier Division

Third (1): 2011

- U-19 Queensferry Sports Flintshire Junior & Youth Football League

Winner (1): 2019
Runner Up (1): 2018

- Welsh National League Division One

Winner (2): 1967, 1976
Runner Up (3): 1953, 1984, 2005
Third (1) : 1966

- Welsh National League Division Two

Winner (4): 1965, 1974, 1983, 2004

- Welsh National League Division Three

Winner (1): 1982
Runner Up (1): 1981

- Welsh National League East Division

Winner (2): 1948, 1949

- North Wales Alliance League Division Two

Runner Up (1): 1921

=== Cups ===
- Welsh National League Premier Division Cup

Runner Up: 2013

- North East Wales FA Junior (Horace Wynne) Cup

Winner: 1976
Runner Up: 2009

- Denbighshire and Flintshire Charity Cup

Runner Up (1): 1909
Semi Finalists: 1908

- St. Martins Cup

Runner Up (1): 1909

- North East Wales Football League Premier Cup

Runner up (1): 2025–26
