= Saltney Town F.C. =

Association football club in Wales

Coordinates: 53°10′28.6″N 2°56′21″W

Saltney Town
- Full name: Saltney Town Football Club
- Nickname: The Bordermen
- Founded: 2010
- Ground: Sandy Lane
- Manager: Daniel Sands
- League: North East Wales Division One
- 2024–25: North East Wales Premier Division, 10th of 12
- Website: http://www.saltneytownfc.co.uk

Saltney Town Football Club is a football club within the town of Saltney, on the border between England and Wales. They play in the North East Wales Division One.

== History ==
The first record of a Saltney-based football club was in 1908 when they joined The Combination. The Combination was originally composed from clubs from Manchester and Liverpool and their environment. In later years, several Welsh clubs joined. One club, Northwich Victoria, earned admission to the Football League as members of The Combination. This League ran from 1890 to 1911. Saltney had a fantastic first season in the league finishing in 2nd place, Tranmere Rovers finished 3rd! After The Combination folded in 1911 they joined the Liverpool County Football Combination.

In the 1919–20 season, Saltney-based side Crichton's Athletic was a founder member of Cheshire County League. In 1921, the side changed their name to Saltney Athletic. In 1923, the side finished in 6th position before leaving the Cheshire County League.

The history becomes a little hazy from then until the 1974–75 season when Saltney Social became founder members of Clwyd Football League, where they played for two seasons.

For the 1991–92 season, Saltney Community Centre was formed. They entered the Clwyd League system in Division 1. A great start resulted in a 3rd play finish and instant promotion to the prestigious Clwyd Premier Division. In their first effort at the Clwyd top flight they finished in a very respectable 2nd place before going one better the following year, winning the League and being duly promoted to the Welsh Alliance League. In their two seasons in the league they finished in 6th, then 11th positions before resigning from the Alliance in 1998.

The current club was formed in 2010 by two friends from the Saltney area, Marc Edwards and Andrew Johnson. Both have the ultimate vision of bringing their community together through football. The club are also known by their nickname of "The Bordermen", due to where they are situated.

In their debut season, the Bordermen were victorious in both the League Cup, and the prestigious Horace Wynne Cup, beating Llanuwchllyn and Castell Alun Colts in the respective finals. They also finished 3rd in their league, Welsh National Division 1.

== Honours ==
- League Cup

Winners (1): 2010-11

- North East Wales FA Junior (Horace Wynne) Cup

Winners (3): 1991–92, 1992–93, 2010-11

== Notes ==
Information compiled with help from:

- Football Club History Database. https://www.fchd.info/SALTNEY.HTM
- Clwyd Football League. https://web.archive.org/web/20110722075702/http://clwydfootballleague.co.uk/
- Welsh Football Data Archive. http://www.wfda.co.uk
