= F.C. Nomads of Connah's Quay =

Association football club in Wales

FC Nomads
- Full name: FC Nomads of Connah's Quay
- Founded: 2009
- Ground: Wepre Park, Connah's Quay
- Capacity: 1,000
- Chairman: Bernie Attridge
- 2018–19: Welsh National League Premier Division, 4th (of 15)
Home colours	Away colours

FC Nomads of Connah's Quay, also known as FC Nomads, is an association football club in Connah's Quay Flintshire, Wales. It was founded in 2009 when, during the 2008–09 season, stories started to circulate that Connah's Quay may lose its football team for the first time since 1890, and that they might merge with local rivals Flint. A group of long time supporters and local football experts set out to preserve football in Connah's Quay. In July 2019 the club announced that they had withdrawn from the league but had not folded.

== History ==
Connah's Quay F.C. was founded in 1890. Owing to concerns that Gap Connah's Quay Nomads were about to be dissolved, supporters of the club came together to form a phoenix club. They were placed in the Clwyd League Division Two. Gap Connah's Quay Nomads complained about the new club to the Clwyd League, accusing them of "hijacking" their name. FC Nomads responded saying it was "pettiness" after the league said there was nothing they could do as there was no rule on club names in the league's rulebook.

In their first two seasons, Nomads of Connah's Quay won both Division 1 and Division 2 unbeaten. They went a total of 55 league games unbeaten between 2009 and 2012 when they were beaten by Sychdyn. In 2013, they were promoted to Division 1 of the Welsh National League (Wrexham Area) (WNL) which they were promoted from. They won the WNL Premier Division in 2016. Normally this would have allowed them to enter the Cymru Alliance however the Football Association of Wales blocked their promotion on the grounds that their stadium did not meet league regulations. The club had agreed a groundshare with Airbus UK Broughton at their The Airfield stadium but the agreement came after the FAW's groundshare agreement deadline. In 2019, Nomads of Connah's Quay withdrew their first team from the WNL but kept the youth and veterans team running.

== League history ==
Season	League							
Season	Tier	Division	P	W	D	L	Pts	Pos
2009–10	7	Clwyd League Division 2	20	20	0	0	60	1
2010–11	6	Clwyd League Division 1	24	23	1	0	70	1
2011–12	5	Clwyd East League	18	13	3	2	42	1
2012–13	4	Welsh National League (Wrexham Area) Division One	24	20	2	2	62	2
2013–14	4	Welsh National League (Wrexham Area) Division One	20	20	0	0	51*	1
2014–15	3	Welsh National League (Wrexham Area) Premier Division	30	18	6	6	50	5
2015–16	3	Welsh National League (Wrexham Area) Premier Division	26	18	4	4	58	1
2016-17	3	Welsh National League (Wrexham Area) Premier Division	26	14	3	9	45	6
2017-18	3	Welsh National League (Wrexham Area) Premier Division	28	11	2	15	35	12
2018-19	3	Welsh National League (Wrexham Area) Premier Division	28	15	5	8	50	4

== Cup history ==
FC Nomads were knocked out of the Welsh Cup in the first round in 2015–16.
