= Penycae F.C. =

Association football club in Wales

Penycae
- Full name: Penycae Football Club
- Nickname(s): The Cae
- Founded: 1982
- Ground: The Riverside Arena
- Chairman: Colin Jackson
- Manager: Dan Richards
- League: Ardal NE League
- 2024–25: Ardal NE League, 9th of 16
Home colours	Away colours

Penycae Football Club is a Welsh football club based in Pen-y-cae, Wrexham whose first team currently plays in the Ardal NE League. Following on from the growth of the club over recent years, Penycae Football Club is now a registered business and will now operate as Penycae Football Club C.I.C (Community Interest Company). The club also has a team which acts as a pathway to the first team known as the Reserve team. The club run a number of youth teams for 10- to 15-year-olds, and mini teams for children under 10 years of age.

== History ==
Pen-y-cae Football Club had its beginnings in 1982.

In 2005 the football club secured the lease on their Afoneitha ground. The club played in the Huws Gray Cymru Alliance from 2010 until 2015, despite being in 4th position in November. In March 2020 all football ceased owing to the COVID-19 pandemic. This was to be the last season under the Welsh National League umbrella, thus handing over league control to newly named FAW Ardal Leagues. Penycae will find themselves in 20/21 (covid dependent) in a league along with Corwen, Cefn Albion, Chirk AAA and Rhos Aelwyd, and also containing teams from mid and west wales in a new structure shake up.

== The Riverside Arena ==
After securing the lease in 2005 the club began to develop the ground and has to date secured the facility with palisade fencing, added hard standing to all four sides of the pitch, a stand on one side (The Kenny Morris Memorial Stand) which provides covered accommodation for up to 150, two brick dugout areas which can seat up to 7 people, opened a clubhouse which can cater for up to 100 people, added a building adjacent to the clubhouse which house's toilets for gents, women/disabled along with a new kitchen, an outside seating area and upgraded the original pavilion which now has two changing rooms which can accommodate up to 20 players, an LPG shower system and extra spectator toilets.

In June 2019, as part of a sponsorship deal, the Riverside was renamed The SoccerMillion Riverside Arena.

=== The Karl Thomas Memorial Hall ===
In October 2011 the club were offered a portable building that had been previously used as classrooms in Rhosymedre School free of charge with the only cost being the transporting of the building to the grounds. However, not being in a financial position to afford this offer the club approached members of Karl's family to see if it was possible to release some money from the jointly run memorial fund to finance the project. They agreed with the aim of not only turning the building into a facility that all sections of the club could use but more importantly to name the building after him.

With the support and generosity of many local companies, plus a huge amount of fundraising the club were in a position to open the building and on Sunday, 28 April 2013, it was officially opened and named "The Karl Thomas Memorial Hall" by Karl's mother Heulwen, sisters Sharon and Debbie and Susan Elan Jones, MP for South Clwyd.

In November 2016 the club undertook the task of trying to secure not only a full license but also to have the hiring restrictions lifted on the building to enable the general public to hire the facility. Following months of meetings, negotiations and expense the club in April 2017 announced that "The Karl Thomas Memorial Hall" had now been awarded a full license and had the restrictions lifted.

The clubhouse can accommodate up to 80 people.

=== The Stuart Griffiths Hospitality Suite ===
This building was originally used as a catering van for match days and after its relocation due to the extension on the clubhouse it was decided to try and turn it into a spectator/sponsor facility. It is used for match sponsors and to provide any spectators with disabilities or additional needs some comfort.

The building was officially opened by Councillor John Phillips on Sunday 27 January 2019 and named in honour of club stalwart and Chairman "Stuart Griffiths" who has been a huge part of Penycae Football Club since its inception in 1982.

=== Bando's ===
In October 2016 the club took possession of and old portable building and began the task of turning it into a facility to house new toilets for gents and women/disabled along with a new kitchen and a first aid/office room. After 8 months of fundraising and obtaining grants along with the help and support they received from local companies and individuals the building was finished in April 2017. It was officially opened by Councillor John Phillips on Friday 5 May 2017, the building was named 'Bandos' in honour of David Lovell.

== First Team Squad ==
As of August 2025 Note: Flags indicate national team as defined under FIFA eligibility rules; some limited exceptions apply. Players may hold more than one non-FIFA nationality.

No.	Pos.	Nation	Player
—	GK	WAL	Gabriel Pebeyre
—	DF	ITA	Josh Mazzarella
—	DF	WAL	Will Scott
—	DF	WAL	Jac Scott
—	DF	WAL	Dyfan Smith
—	DF	WAL	Toby Green
—	DF	WAL	Ryan Dacey
—	DF	WAL	Harry Killick
—	DF	WAL	Finlay Colley
—	MF	WAL	Harry Bowen
—	MF	WAL	Osian Williams
—	MF	WAL	Jack Orbell
—	MF	WAL	Ben Buley
—	FW	ENG	Tom Edwards
—	MF	WAL	Harry Fuller
—	MF	WAL	Toby Nash
—	FW	WAL	Zac Davies (captain)
—	FW	WAL	Thomas Blaze

== Honours ==
- Welsh National League (Wrexham Area) Premier Division Champions: 1993–94, 2010–11
- Welsh National League (Wrexham Area) Premier Division Runners Up: 2000–01, 2001–02, 2002–03, 2003–04, 2008–09
- Welsh National League (Wrexham Area) Division 1 Runners Up: 1984–85
- Welsh National League (Wrexham Area) Division 3 Champions: 1983–84
- Welsh National League (Wrexham Area) Division 4 Runners Up: 1982–83
- North East Wales FA Junior (Horace Wynne) Cup Winners: 1982–83, 1983–84, 1984–85
- North East Wales Football Association Challenge Cup Finalists: 1997–98
- Welsh National League (Wrexham Area) Division 3 Cup Winners: 1983–84
- Welsh National League (Wrexham Area) Division 4 Cup Finalists: 1982–83
- Welsh National League (Wrexham Area) Reserve / Colts Division League Cup Winners: 2018–19
- Welsh National League (Wrexham Area) Reserve / Colts Division Runners Up: 2018–19
- Dave Bennett Premier Division Cup Winners: 1993–94
- Cymru Alliance Cup Runners Up: 1996–97
- FAW Welsh Trophy Winners: 2003–04
- FAW Welsh Trophy Runners Up: 2008–09
- Presidents Cup Runners Up: 2011–12
