= New Brighton Villa F.C. =

Association football club in Wales

New Brighton Villa
- Full name: New Brighton Villa Football Club
- Nickname(s): The Yellers
- Founded: 1997
- Dissolved: 2023
- Ground: Estadio de Mark Lopez
- 2022–23: North East Wales Premier Division, 5th of 10 (club folded after season)

New Brighton Villa Football Club was a Welsh football team based in New Brighton in Flintshire, north-east Wales. The team last played in the North East Wales Football League Premier Division, which is at the fourth tier of the Welsh football league system.

== History ==
The original New Brighton Villa, existed between 1987 and 1996, and competed in the Welsh National League (Wrexham Area) Premier Division before they folded. This current version of the club was founded in 1997 as New Brighton FC, before changing back to New Brighton Villa in 2008.

The club joined the newly formed North East Wales Football League in 2020 as a Premier Division club.

In June 2023, following the end of the season, the club announced it was folding with immediate effect.

== Honours ==
- Welsh National League (Wrexham Area) Division One - Runners-up: 1992–93
- Welsh National League (Wrexham Area) Division Two - Champions: 2004–05
