= Llanuwchllyn F.C. =

Association football club in Wales

Llanuwchllyn
- Full name: Clwb Pêl Droed Llanuwchllyn
- Nickname: Llan
- Founded: 1957
- Ground: Cae Gwalia, Church Street
- Capacity: c. 1,000 (100 seated)
- Coordinates: 52°54′44″N 3°36′5″W
- Chairman: Dei Charles
- Manager: Siôn Tudor Jones
- League: Cymru North
- 2025–26: Ardal NE League, 1st of 16 (promoted)

Llanuwchllyn Football Club (Welsh: Clwb Pêl Droed Llanuwchllyn) is a Welsh football team from the village of Llanuwchllyn, near Bala in Wales. They play in the Cymru North.

== History ==
=== Early years ===
The club was formed in 1957 and entered the Welsh National League (Wrexham Area) in 1963, winning the Third Division in their first season. Over the next three decades they played at the lower levels of the league before disbanding in 1986 due to financial issues.

=== Club reformation ===
The club was reformed in 1989 and returned to the Welsh National League (Wrexham Area) Division Two. For the 1999–2000 season they were promoted to Division One. After finishing third in the 2001–02 season they were promoted to the Premier Division but their stay in the top flight was to be only one season and after finishing second from bottom of the table, they were relegated back to Division One.

The club remained in Division One and most of the next decade saw them struggle, regularly finishing near the bottom of the table. The 2012–13 season saw a marked improvement with them finishing third in the league, which they then also repeated during the 2013–14 season. The following two seasons saw them go one better, finishing divisional runners-up in 2014–15 and gaining promoting back to the Premier Division at the end of the 2015–16 season as runners-up.

=== Return to the Welsh National Wrexham Premier ===
The club's first season back in the Premier Division saw them finish third, followed by a sixth place finish the following season. The following 2018–19 season came with a change of manager, and the club narrowly avoided relegation after finishing second from bottom of the table (as only 15 teams finished the season, they were granted a reprieve from relegation.) The 2019–20 season saw them finish mid-table.

=== Ardal Leagues ===
The club raised money in 2020 to allow it to undertake the works required for the club to continue in tier three after the reorganisation of the Welsh football pyramid including building a 100 seat stand. It was subsequently announced that the club would join the new national tier three Ardal Leagues for the 2020–21 season although the season was cancelled as a result of Coronavirus restrictions.

Their Ardal Northwest debut season saw them finishing sixth. At the end of the season they transferred to the Ardal Northeast for the 2022–23 season, finishing fourth. The 2023–24 season saw them undertake various ground improvement works, including a new playing surface and be granted a tier 2 licence. They finished the season third and qualified for the Ardal North play-off to determine promotion to the Cymru North. Playing Llay Welfare in the play-off final, the clubs finished 0–0 after extra time before Llay triumphed 6–5 on penalties to secure promotion.

The 2024–25 season saw the club go on a Welsh Cup run, beating Cymru Premier side Newtown in the second round and Swansea University in the third round, before exiting the competition in the fourth round, beaten by Denbigh Town. They again finished in third place in the league, qualifying for the play-off final. Playing Holyhead Hotspur, the club were defeated 3–0, again missing out on promotion. There was to be no repeat of this in the 2025–26 season with the club finishing as Ardal Northeast champions. The season also saw them reach the final of the Ardal North Cup, being defeated 2–1 by Ardal Northwest champions, Bangor City 1876. Meilir Williams had scored 52 goals during the season for the club and scored his 53rd in the final.

=== Cymru North ===
As 2025–26 Ardal NE champions, and with a tier two licence granted by the Football Association of Wales, the club were promoted to the Cymru North for the 2026–27 season.

== Honours ==
- Ardal NE
  - Champions: 2025–26
- Ardal North Play-Off Final
  - Finalists: 2023–24, 2024–25
- Ardal North Cup
  - Runners-up: – 2025–26
- Welsh National League (Wrexham Area) Division One
  - Runners-up: 2014–15; 2015–16
- Welsh National League (Wrexham Area) Division Three
  - Champions: 1963–64
