= Brymbo F.C. =

Association football club in Wales

Coordinates: 53°3′51.9″N 3°2′55.5″W

Brymbo FC
- Full name: Brymbo Football Club
- Nickname: The Steelmen
- Founded: 1943
- Ground: The Crick; Tanyfron, Wrexham; Wrexham
- Manager: Connor Richardson & Ieuan Rowe
- League: North East Wales Division Two
- 2024–25: North East Wales Championship, 6th of 15
Home colours

Brymbo Football Club are a football club based in Tanyfron, Wrexham. They play in the North East Wales Division Two. The team, originally Brymbo Steelworks F.C., was formed as part of Brymbo Steelworks.

== History ==
Brymbo Football Club was formed over 70 years ago as part of the Brymbo Steelworks Complex. During their history Brymbo F.C. have won the Welsh National League (Wrexham Area) on fourteen occasions and have numerous Cup successes, the major ones being the 1967 Welsh Amateur Cup win and the Welsh F.A. Brymbo F.C became winners of the Cymru Alliance League Cup at the first attempt under management of Gareth Powell who later went onto manage Lex XI. Gareth Powell had also managed Cefn Druids who helped the club steadily consolidated in the Cymru Alliance, helped by a renewed youth policy who strolled to the 1998–99 Cymru Alliance championship, scoring over 100 goals in the process.

=== Merger with New Broughton ===
In 1996, Brymbo merged with neighbouring village team New Broughton F.C. to create Brymbo Broughton. At that time Brymbo played in the Cymru Alliance League while New Broughton were in the Welsh National League (Wrexham Area) Premier Division. New Broughton had a good, experienced committee and were financially sound, but their playing facilities (which were council owned) did not reach the standards set for a higher level of football. Brymbo, however, had excellent facilities but were lacking experience and expertise in key off-field positions and were financially insecure.

=== Merger with Summerhill United ===
In 2005, Brymbo Broughton merged with Summerhill United to form Summerhill Brymbo. This lasted for one season before the name was reverted to Brymbo for the 2006–07 season.

In the 2018–19 season the club originally finished third in the league. After the end of the season were deducted the second highest points in Welsh league history, 63 points, and instead finished bottom of the league. The club avoided relegation from the division as FC Nomads of Connah's Quay withdrew from the league and Hawarden Rangers accepted relegation.

== Facilities ==
The club is based at The Brymbo Sports and Social Complex in Tanyfron.

The home colours are amber and black shirts with black shorts and socks.

== Honours ==
Brymbo and New Broughton Senior Teams

=== League ===
Brymbo

- Cymru Alliance

Runners-up : 1995
Third : 1996

- Welsh National League (Wrexham Area) Premier Division

Winners : 2007, 2008

Brymbo Steelworks

- Welsh National League (Wrexham Area) Premier Division

Winners : 1958, 1966, 1967, 1969, 1970, 1971, 1974, 1977, 1978, 1979, 1982, 1983, 2007, 2008
Runners-up : 1946, 1955, 1956, 1972, 1976, 1978, 1984
Third : 1962, 1968, 1980, 1981, 1988

Brymbo Broughton

- Welsh National League (Wrexham Area) Premier Division

Third : 2004

New Broughton

- Welsh National League (Wrexham Area) Premier Division

Third : 1952

- Welsh National League (Wrexham Area) Division 1

Winners : 1991, 1996
Runners-up : 1951

- Welsh National League (Wrexham Area) Division 2

Winners : 1990

- Welsh National League (Wrexham Area) Division 3

Winners : 1988

- Welsh National League (Wrexham Area) Division 4

Winners : 1981

=== Cups ===
Brymbo

- FAW Trophy

Winners : 2007

- North East Wales FA Challenge Cup

Winners : 1996

- Welsh National League (Wrexham Area) Premier Division League Cup

Winners : 2008, 2013

- Presidents Cup

Winners : 1996

Brymbo Steelworks

- FAW Trophy

Winners : 1967
Runners-up : 1980, 1983

- North East Wales FA Challenge Cup

Winners : 1970, 1971, 1982, 1983, 1985

- Welsh National League (Wrexham Area) Premier Division League Cup

Winners : 1948, 1969, 1970, 1981, 1982, 1983, 1984, 1986

New Broughton

- Welsh National League (Wrexham Area) Premier Division League Cup

Winners : 1996

- Welsh National League (Wrexham Area) Division One League Cup

Winners : 1991
