= Brickfield Rangers F.C. =

Coordinates: 53°2′32.5″N 3°0′54.9″W

Brickfield Rangers
- Full name: Brickfield Rangers Football Club
- Founded: 1976
- Ground: Clywedog Park; Wrexham
- Capacity: 1,000 Standing
- Chairman: Paul Hooson
- Manager: Gareth Wilson
- League: Cymru North
- 2025–26: Cymru North, 10th of 16
Home colours	Away colours

Brickfield Rangers F.C. is a Welsh football club based in Wrexham. They play in the Cymru North.

== History ==
The club joined Welsh National League (Wrexham Area) in 1994, and after 2000 played in the Premier Division. In 2007–08, they finished bottom of the table, but avoided relegation due to internal league re-organisation. In the 2009–10 season, they finished 12th. In the 2016–17 and 2017–18 seasons they finished as league runners-up on consecutive occasions.

The club were placed in the newly formed Tier 3 Ardal Leagues for the 2020–21 season, which was cancelled due to the coronavirus pandemic. After three seasons in the Ardal Northwest, for the 2024–25 season, the club was laterally transferred to the Ardal Northeast, winning the league at their first attempt and gaining promotion to the Tier 2 Cymru North. In their first season at Tier 2 level, the club finished in 10th place.

Brickfield Rangers has had a range of notable players come through its youth ranking system including Robbie Savage, Jim and Jeff Whitley, David Hooson, Gareth Evans and Aeron Edwards.

== Current squad ==
As of 29 August 2026

Note: Flags indicate national team as defined under FIFA eligibility rules; some limited exceptions apply. Players may hold more than one non-FIFA nationality.

No.	Pos.	Nation	Player
—	GK	WAL	Carl Jones
—	GK	WAL	Ryan Price
—	DF	WAL	Bobby Beaumont-Broadhead
—	DF	WAL	Jack Edwards
—	DF	WAL	Kiran Russell
—	DF	WAL	Matthew Williams
—	DF	ENG	Tom Williams
—	DF	WAL	Josh Watkin
—	DF	WAL	Ryan Williams
—	MF	WAL	Dennis Bates
—	MF	WAL	Dominic Doherty
—	MF	WAL	Ryan Davies
—	MF	WAL	Charley Edge
—	MF	WAL	Rob Evans

No.	Pos.	Nation	Player
—	MF	WAL	Josh Griffiths
—	MF	POR	Gerson Silva Neto
—	MF	ENG	Callum Scruton
—	MF	WAL	Alex Darlington
—	MF	WAL	Josh Evans
—	FW	WAL	Aiden Fox
—	FW	ENG	Calum Huxley
—	FW	GBS	Jardel Junior
—	FW	WAL	Danny Jones
—	FW	WAL	Jay Richardson
—	FW	WAL	Andy Vale
—	FW	ENG	Sam Flory
—	MF	WAL	Lewis Wynne (on loan from The New Saints)

== Staff ==
- Chairman: (Wales) Paul Hooson
- Vice-chairman: (Wales) Tony Williams
- First Team Manager: (Wales) Gareth Wilson
- First Team Assistant Manager: (Wales) Simon Cooke
- Secretary: (Wales) David Murray
- Disability Manager: (Wales) Del Williams
- Committee Members: Mike Derosa, Simon Mullen, Kevin Owen
- Girls Secretary: Matt Carr

== Managerial history ==
- (Wales) Andrew Ruscoe (2007)
- (Wales) David Hooson (2007–?)
- (Wales) Peter Gabriel (?–2016)
- (England) Simon Sedgewick (2016–2018)
- (Wales) Nicky Ward (2018–2019)
- (Wales) Andrew Ruscoe (2019–2020)
- (Wales) Gareth Wilson (2020–date)

== Honours ==
- Ardal NE
  - Champions: 2024–25
- Ardal North Cup
  - Finalists: 2024–25
- Welsh National League (Wrexham Area) Premier Division

Runners-Up : 2017, 2018

- Welsh National League (Wrexham Area) Division One

Runners-Up : 2000
Third : 1998, 1999
