= Lex XI F.C. =

Association football club in Wales

Lex Glyndwr XI
- Full name: Lex Glyndwr XI Football Club
- Nickname: The Lawmen
- Founded: 1965
- Ground: Stansty Park Summerhill Road, Wrexham
- Capacity: 1,250 (200 seating)
- League: North East Wales Division One
- 2025–26: Ardal NE League, 16th of 16 (relegated)
Home colours	Away colours

Lex Glyndwr XI F.C. are a Welsh football team based in Wrexham. They play in the North East Wales Division One.

== History ==
Lex Football Club was founded in 1965. Lex is the Latin word for 'law'; this name comes from the fact they were formed by a group of solicitors. Accordingly the club is also referred to by the nickname "The Lawmen".

Lex has hosted numerous great games at Stansty Park over the years and in the Summer of 2014 hosted a fundraising game between themselves and a Wrexham FC legends XI which include big names such as Karl Connolly, Dixie McNeil and Steve Watkin. Lex also hosted the 2013 North East Wales Football Association under 16's cup final, which saw Borras Park Albion YFC beat Shotton Steel YFC 4–3 on penalties in front of a 200 strong crowd.

The club withdrew from the Welsh National League in February 2019 after being unable to field a team. They rejoined later that year for the 2019–20 season as a Division One club.

The club joined the newly formed North East Wales Football League in 2020 as a Premier Division club. In 2025 they were promoted to the Ardal North West, at the third tier of the Welsh football league system. After promotion, the manager Ricky Evans left the club.

== Honours ==
- Welsh National League Premier Division - Champions: 1984–85, 1987–88, 1988–89
- North East Wales Football League Premier Division - Champions: 2024–25
- Cymru Alliance League Cup - Winners: 1990–91, 1991–92
- Cymru Alliance League Cup - Runners-up: 2003–04
- North East Wales FA Challenge Cup - Winners: 1988–89, 1990–91, 2008–09
- North East Wales FA Challenge Cup - Runners-up: 1981–82, 1982–83, 1984–85, 1994–95, 1995–96, 1998–99, 2000–01
- Mike Beech Trophy - Winners: 2024–25 (reserves)
