= Llangollen Town F.C. =

Association football club in Wales

Coordinates: 52°58′34″N 3°10′33″W

- Full name: Llangollen Town Football Club
- Nickname: The Town
- Founded: 1908
- Ground: Tower Fields, Dinbren Road, Llangollen
- Chairman: Robert Evans
- Manager: Luke Maybury
- League: Ardal NE League
- 2025–26: Ardal NE League, 12th of 16
Home colours	Away colours

Llangollen Town F.C. is a Welsh football club based in Llangollen playing in the Ardal NE League.

== History ==
The club was founded in 1908.

The club joined the Wrexham & District League in 1931, which would later be renamed to the Welsh National League (Wrexham Area).

In 2009, the club were promoted to the Cymru Alliance, finishing 11th in their first season, but were relegated due to a restructure of the Welsh leagues.

The club joined the newly formed North East Wales Football League in 2020 as a Premier Division club.

In 2022, the club were promoted to the Ardal Leagues after finishing fifth in the North East Wales Football League Premier Division, replacing Machynlleth who withdrew from the league in pre-season.

== Honours ==
- 1968 League Champions
- 1972 League Champions
- 1974 North East Wales FA Challenge Cup Winners
- 1985 Division Three Champions (Reserves)
- 1986 League Champions
- 1996 North East Wales FA Junior (Horace Wynne) Cup Winners
- 1996 Division One League Cup Winners
- 2006 Premier League Cup Winners
- 2009 League Champions and President Cup Winners

== Current squad ==
1. Ben Lloyd (gk)

2. Jack Goulbourn

3. Callum Roberts

4. Lee Emberton

5. Meuryn Hughes

6. Gwilym Keddie

7. Keiron Hughes

8. Kristian Jones (c)

9. Benjamin Wilson

10. Daniel Weir

11. Will Cooke

12. Darnell Prescott

13. Ben Realey

14. Tom Williams

15. Vinnie Cooke

16. Jake Hayward

17. Jamie Samuels

18. Jack Hanley

19. Benjamin Davies

20. George Roberts

21. Josh Pilgrim

22. Simon Williams

23. Ollie Bentley (gk)

== Other Info ==
Not to be confused with Llangollen F.C.
