= Borras Park Albion F.C. =

Borras Park Albion
- Full name: Borras Park Albion Football Club
- Founded: 1979
- Ground: Dean Road
- Capacity: n/a
- Chairman: Ivan Povey
- 2021–22: North East Wales Championship, (resigned from league)
Home colours	Away colours

Borras Park Albion Football Club are a football club based in Wrexham. They last played in the North East Wales Football League Championship.

The club was formed in 1979 from two street teams in Borras Park; Clark Road and Monmouth Road. The chairman and Manager at that time was Mr Bob Groom and his wife Shelagh (Administrator). They are now presidents of the club.

After the first year of being formed a trip was organised to New York and Borras played in a very large football tournament in Long Island. The following year a twinning was formed between TUS Plettenberg in Germany. Plettenberg is South East of Cologne, 24 km from Ludenscheid. There are many exchanges in existence but this has probably been the most successful April 2020 both Borras Park Albion and TUS Plettenberg will celebrate 40 years of Football Exchange partnerships and friendships. Approximately 800+ Children from Borras have visited Plettenberg and 800+ from Plettenberg have visited Borras.

From this small beginning the club has grown and entered the Wrexham and District Youth Football League. We now run teams in all age groups from U8's to U16's and in some cases there are multiple teams in the age groups. Each weekend over 290 players turn out for Borras Park Albion making it one of the largest Grassroots football clubs in North Wales.

The home colours are typically Yellow Shirts with Royal Blue Shorts and Socks .

The club joined the newly formed North East Wales Football League in 2020 as a Championship club. They resigned from the league's first season, 2021–22, towards the end of the season, in April 2022.

The club continues to exist playing junior level sides.

== Honours ==
=== League ===
Information sourced from FCHD.

- Welsh National League (Wrexham Area) Division One – Champions: 2012–13
- Welsh National League (Wrexham Area) Division One – Runners-up: 2000–01, 2010–11, 2011–12
- Welsh National League (Wrexham Area) Division Two – Champions: 1998–99

=== Cups ===
- Welsh National League (Wrexham Area) Division One League Cup – Winners: 2012–13
- North East Wales FA Junior (Horace Wynne) Cup – Winners: 1998–99
