= Castell Alun Colts F.C. =

- Founded: 1972
- Ground: Castell Alun Sports & Leisure Complex; Hope; Flintshire
- Chairman: Dion Williams
- Manager: Gareth Crewe
- League: North East Wales Division One
- 2024–25: North East Wales Premier Division, 8th of 12
| Home colours | Away colours |

Castell Alun Football Club are a football club based in Hope, Flintshire. They play in the North East Wales Division One. The home colours are green & black shirts, black shorts and black socks.

== History ==
The club joined the newly formed North East Wales Football League in 2020 as a Premier Division club.

== Honours ==
=== League ===
- Welsh National League (Wrexham Area) Premier Division – Champions: 2002–03
- Welsh National League (Wrexham Area) Division One – Champions: 1996–97, 2005–06
- Welsh National League (Wrexham Area) Division One – Runners-up: 2018–19
- Welsh National League (Wrexham Area) Division Two – Champions: 1976–77
- Welsh National League (Wrexham Area) Division Two – Runners-up: 1989–90, 2004–05
- Welsh National League (Wrexham Area) Division Three – Champions: 1975–76
- Welsh National League (Wrexham Area) Division Four – Champions: 1974–75

=== Cups ===
- Welsh National League (Wrexham Area) Premier Division Cup – Winners: 1997–98
- Welsh National League (Wrexham Area) Division One League Cup – Winners: 1995–96, 1996–97
- Welsh National League (Wrexham Area) Division One League Cup – Runners-up: 2011–12
- North East Wales FA Junior (Horace Wynne) Cup – Winners: 1974–75, 1979–80
