= Hawarden Rangers F.C. =

Association football club in Wales

Coordinates: 53°11′18.4″N 3°2′9.3″W

Hawarden Rangers
- Full name: Hawarden Rangers Football Club
- Founded: 1974
- Stadium: Gladstone Playing Fields
- Chairman: Lyn Owen
- Manager: Andrew Butler
- League: North East Wales Division One
- 2024–25: North East Wales Premier Division, 9th of 12
- Website: www.hawardenrangersfc.com
Home colours	Away colours

Hawarden Rangers F.C. is a Welsh football club playing in Hawarden, Flintshire, after being founded in 1974 by Elwyn Owen. They currently play in the North East Wales Division One.

The senior team were members of the North East Wales Football League Premier Division, following the restructure of the FA Wales Pyramid Structure and have previously been members of the Welsh National League (Wrexham Area) and prior to that, the Clwyd League.

The Junior sections consist of teams ranging from U6 to U19, all of which compete in the Queensferry Sports Flintshire Junior and Youth League.

== History ==
Hawarden Rangers Football Club was formed in 1974 by Elwyn Owen.

The club's patron is the grandson of Victorian Prime Minister; Sir William Gladstone. It was he, who had the foresight to leave the Gladstone Playing Fields to the local people for future enjoyment and recreation, which is the reasoning behind the Hawarden Castle gates on the club crest.

The senior setup were founder members of the Clwyd League, which was set up to improve the level in the area whilst the junior section was created in 1984 by the amalgamation of the two local teams; Hawarden Wayfarers and Hawarden Pathfinders, respectively.

Following the amalgamation, the club became Hawarden United before changing to Hawarden Rangers Football Club, which now has over 200 junior members aged between 6 – 16, and over 50 senior members split between a First Team, Reserves Team and an Under 19s Team.

In 2019, there was also the creation of a Veterans Team, managed by club legend; Mark Evans.

The club joined the newly formed North East Wales Football League in 2020 as a Premier Division club. On 9 June 2022, it was announced that the club had been promoted to the tier 3 Ardal NW League for the 2022–23 season via the vacancy route.

== Famous Past Players ==
Hawarden Rangers has a rich history of past players that have gone on to professional level, most notably;

- Barry Horne: Retired, ex-Everton F.C. defender who earned 59 caps for Wales.
- Ian Rush: Retired, former Liverpool F.C. and Wales striker who also had a stint as manager of Chester City.
- Michael Owen: Retired, previously of Liverpool F.C., Real Madrid, Newcastle, Manchester United & Stoke City. Attended Hawarden High School. Now commentates on BT Sport.
- Andy Dorman: Retired, enjoyed spells at FC Boston, New England Revolution, Scottish club St. Mirren and English side Crystal Palace. Attended Hawarden High School.
- Ian Edwards: Retired, previously of Crystal Palace, West Bromwich Albion, Chester City & Wrexham.
- David Brett: Retired, previously of Chester City & Colwyn Bay.
- Nick Henderson Retired, previously of Colwyn Bay, Cheshire Police, Nick is now the club vice-chairmen.

== Hawarden Rangers Staff ==
=== Club Officials ===
Position	Name
President	Fred Evans
Chairperson	Lyn Owen
Vice-chairman	Nick Henderson
Secretary	Dave Dickel
Treasurer	Alyson Oates
Safeguarding Officer	Claire Sumner

=== First Team Management ===
Position	Name
Manager	John Cannon
Coach	Dominic Auty
Secretary	Stuart Lawrence
Captain	Ellis Jones

=== Reserves Team Management ===
Position	Name
Manager	Liam Smith
Coach	Sam McCormick
Secretary	Stuart Lawrence
Captain	Thomas Williams

=== Development Team Management ===
Position	Name
Coach	Dominic Auty
Helper	Tom Owen
Captain	Jonathan Simpson

== Senior Teams - Honours ==
=== First Team ===
- Clwyd League – President's Cup
  - Winners: 1987–88, 2004–05
- Football Association of Wales – Fair Play Award
  - Winners: 2012–13, 2013–14, 2014–15
- NWCFA Junior Cup
  - Winners: 1981–82
- Welsh National League Division 1
  - Winners: 2019–20
- Welsh National League Division 3 – Challenge Cup
  - Winners: 2006–07

=== First Team - Player Accolades ===
League Season	Manager's Player of the Season	Player's Player of the Season	Young Player of the Season	Clubman of the Year
2021 - 2022	Aaron North	Ryan Tierney	Jonathan Simpson	Josh Williams
2019 - 2020	Tom Bridges	Tom Bridges	N/A	Charlie Bradford
2018 - 2019	Tom Williams	George Thomas	N/A	Dominic Auty
2017 - 2018	George Thomas	Craig Stewart	N/A	Tim McCarthy

=== Reserves Team ===
- North East Wales Football League - Reserves Division*
  - Winners: 2021 - 2022
- North East Wales Football League - The Reserves Cup*
  - Runners Up: 2021 - 2022
- Welsh National League Reserves Division – Challenge Cup
  - Winners: 2013–14
  - Runners Up: 2014–15, 2018–19
- Welsh National League Reserves Division – Fair Play Award
  - Winners: 2010–11, 2016–17

=== Reserves Team - Player Accolades ===
League Season	Manager's Player of the Season	Player's Player of the Season	Clubman of the Year
2021 - 2022	Alun Wilson	Ste Wilson	Eric Thomas
2019 - 2020	Ayden De Winter	Ayden De Winter	Dominic Auty
2018 - 2019	Connor Spencer-Wilson	Tom Janney	Charlie Bradford
2017 - 2018	Daniel Beach	Ellis Jones	Charlie Bradford

=== Veterans Team ===
- Welsh National League - Veterans Championship Division
  - Winners: 2021–22
- North East Wales Football Association - Veterans Cup
  - Winners: 2021–22

=== Development Team ===
- Flintshire Youth League
  - Winners: 2021–22
- Flintshire Youth League U19 – Challenge Cup
  - Runners Up: 2021–22

== Youth Teams - Honours ==
=== Under 18 ===
- NEWFA Youth Cup
  - Winners: 1977–78, 1978–79, 1979–80, 1980–81, 1982–83, 1987–88, 1988–89, 1989–90, 1991–92
- NWCFA Youth Challenge Cup
  - Winners: 1979–80, 1990–91

== Junior Teams - Honours ==
=== Under 17 ===
- NWCFA Junior Challenge Cup
  - Winners: 1997–98

=== Under 16 ===
- Clwyd Junior League – Consolation Cup
  - Winners: 1994–95
- Flintshire Junior League
  - Winners: 1987–88, 1988–89, 1996–97, 1997–98
- Flintshire Junior League – Challenge Cup
  - Winners: 1995–96, 1997–98, 1999–00, 2004–05, 2017–18, 2018–19
- NEWFA Junior Challenge Cup
  - Winners: 1987–88, 1997–98, 2018–19
- NWCFA Junior Challenge Cup
  - Winners: 1990–91

=== Under 15 ===
- Flintshire Junior League
  - Winners: 1996–97, 2015–16
- Flintshire Junior League – Challenge Cup
  - Winners: 1995–96, 1996–97, 1998–99, 2015–16
- Flintshire Junior League – Fair Play Award
  - Winners: 2014–15
- NEWFA Junior Challenge Cup
  - Winners: 2015–16
- NWCFA Junior Challenge Cup
  - Winners: 1994–95, 1995–96

=== Under 14 ===
- Clwyd Junior League – Consolation Cup
  - Winners: 1994–95
- Flintshire Junior League – Challenge Cup
  - Winners: 1990–91, 2010–11, 2018–19
- Flintshire Junior League – Fair Play Award
  - Winners: 2014–15
- NEWFA Junior Challenge Cup
  - Winners: 1990–91, 1996–97, 1999–00, 2016–17
- NWCFA Junior Challenge Cup
  - Winners: 1993–94

=== Under 14 (Comets) ===
- Flintshire Junior League – Fair Play Award
  - Winners: 2016–17

=== Under 14 (Hawks) ===
- Flintshire Junior League
  - Winners: 2016–17
- Flintshire Junior League – Challenge Cup
  - Winners: 2016–17

=== Under 13 ===
- Flintshire Junior League
  - Winners: 1995–96, 2008–09, 2018–19
- Flintshire Junior League – Challenge Cup
  - Winners: 1996–97, 2003–04, 2018–19
- Flintshire Junior League – Fair Play Award
  - Winners: 2017–18
- NEWFA Junior Challenge Cup
  - Winners: 2015–16
- NWCFA Junior Challenge Cup
  - Winners: 1994–95, 1998–99

=== Under 12 ===
- Clwyd Junior League – Consolation Cup
  - Winners: 1986–87, 1990–91
- Flintshire Junior League – Challenge Cup
  - Winners: 1996–97, 1998–99, 2001–02, 2002–03, 2016–17, 2018–19
- Flintshire Junior League – Division 1
  - Winners: 1988–89, 1992–93, 1994–95, 1996–97, 2007–08, 2016–17
- Flintshire Junior League – Division 2
  - Winners: 1991–92, 1993–94
- Flintshire Junior League – Fair Play Award
  - Winners: 2016–17
- NEWFA Junior Challenge Cup
  - Winners: 2003–04, 2016–17
- NWCFA Junior Challenge Cup
  - Winners: 1992–93

=== Under 12 (Hawks) ===
- Flintshire Junior League
  - Winners: 2014–15
- Flintshire Junior League – Challenge Cup
  - Winners: 2014–15

=== Under 11 ===
- Clwyd Junior League – Mini Tournament
  - Winners: 2002–03

=== Under 10 ===
- Clwyd Junior League
  - Winners: 1991–92
- Clwyd Junior League – Challenge Cup
  - Winners: 1991–92
- Clwyd Junior League – Mini Tournament
  - Winners: 1997–98, 1999–00, 2000–01

=== Under 9 ===
- Clwyd Junior League – Mini Tournament
  - Winners: 1995–96, 1996–97

=== Under 8 ===
- Clwyd Junior League – Mini Tournament
  - Winners: 2000–01, 2001–02
