= Rhos Aelwyd F.C. =

Association football club in Wales

Coordinates: 53°0′40″N 3°3′7″W

Rhos Aelwyd
- Full name: Rhos Aelwyd Football Club
- Founded: 1943
- Ground: Ponciau Park, Ponciau
- Chairman: Robert Edge
- Manager: Gareth Rhodri Jones
- League: Ardal NE League
- 2025–26: Ardal NE League, 11th of 16
Home colours	Away colours

Rhos Aelwyd F.C. is a Welsh football club based in Ponciau. The club are currently members of the Ardal NE League and play at Ponciau Park.

== History ==
The club was established in January 1943 in Rhosllannerchrugog and was initially a youth club. In 1958 they merged with Ponciau Aelwyd.

Playing in the Welsh National League (Wrexham Area), the club won the Division Two Cup in 1955. In 1958–59 they won both Division Two and the Division Two cup, and were promoted to Division One, which they won in 1964–65. However, the club then slipped down the divisions, ending up in Division Four, which they won in 1976–77. They won the Division Three Cup in 1982–83 and were promoted the same year. The following season they won both Division Two and the Division Two Cup.

In 1992 the club joined the Cymru Alliance. After finishing in the bottom half of the table for several seasons, they were relegated back to the Welsh National League in 1997 after finishing bottom of the league.

In 2005–06 the club won the Premier Division. After winning the League Cup in 2008–09, they won the Premier Division again in 2009–10, earning promotion back to the Cymru Alliance.

== Honours ==
- Welsh National League (Wrexham Area)
  - Premier Division champions 2005–06, 2009–10
  - League Cup winners 2008–09
  - Presidents Cup winners 2009–10
  - Division One League Cup winners 1964–65
  - Division Two champions 1958–59, 1982–83
  - Division Two League Cup winners 1954–55, 1958–59, 1982–83
  - Division Three League Cup winners 1981–82
  - Division Four champions 1976–77
- FAW Welsh Trophy
  - Winners 2007–08
  - Runners-up: 2017–18
- Welsh Alliance Barritt Cup
  - Winners 1986
- Cwpan Pantyfedwen
  - Winners 1955, 1962, 1963
- North East Wales FA Challenge Cup
  - Winners 2010–11
