= Overton Recreation F.C. =

Association football club in Wales

Overton Recreation
- Full name: Overton Recreational Football Club
- Nickname: The O's
- Founded: 1998
- Chairman: Dave Smith
- Manager: Dave Edwards
- League: North East Wales Division Two
- 2024–25: North East Wales Championship, 4th of 15
Home colours	Away colours

Overton Recreational Football Club is a Welsh football club based in Overton-on-Dee, Wrexham County Borough. Founded in 1998, they play in the North East Wales Division Two.

== History ==
The club joined the newly formed North East Wales Football League in 2020 as a Premier Division club.

== Honours ==
- Division 1 League Cup Winners: 2006–07
- Division 1 Runners Up: 2006–07
- NEWFA Two Counties Cup: – Winners: 2025–26
