= Llay Welfare F.C. =

Association football club in Wales

Coordinates: 53°5′42″N 3°0′15″W

Llay Welfare
- Full name: Llay Welfare Football Club
- Nickname: The Welly
- Founded: 1931
- Ground: The Ring, Llay
- Chairman: Keiron Fox
- League: Ardal NW League
- 2025–26: Ardal NW League, 6th of 16
Home colours	Away colours

Llay Welfare Football Club is a Welsh football club based in the village of Llay, Wrexham County Borough, who were members of the Welsh National League (Wrexham Area) up until 2020. Formed in 1931, they began their football in the Wrexham and District League which they won in 1936–37 season. They now play in the Ardal NW League.

== Former players ==
- Chris Armstrong

== Honours ==
First Team

- Ardal NW - Runners-up: 2023–24
- Welsh Amateur Cup - Winners: 1935-36
- Welsh Amateur Cup - Runners-up: 1949-50
- Welsh National League – Champions: 1962–63
- North East Wales FA Challenge Cup Winners: 1976–77
- Wrexham and District League – Runners-up: 1936–37
- Welsh National League – Runners-up: 1947–48, 1970–71
- Welsh National League – Division One Champions: 1986–87, 1990–91
- Welsh National League – Division One-Cup Winners: 1958–59

Reserves

- Welsh National League – Division One Runners-up: 1996–97
- Welsh National League – Division Two Champions: 2000–01
- Welsh National League – Division Two Runners-up: 1996–97
- Welsh National League – Division Two-Cup Winners: 1986–87, 1989–90, 2000–01, 2001–02
- Welsh National League – Division 3A Runners-up: 1969–70

Colts

- Welsh National League – Division Two-Cup Winners: 1996–97
