= Chirk AAA F.C. =

Association football club in Wales

Coordinates: 52°56′5″N 3°3′33.7″W

Chirk AAA
- Full name: Chirk Amateur Athletic Association Football Club
- Nickname: The Colliers
- Founded: 1876; 150 years ago
- Ground: Holyhead Road, Chirk
- Capacity: 1,000
- Chairman: Colin Heyward
- Manager: George Austin
- League: North East Wales Division Two
- 2025–26: North East Wales Division One, 12th of 12 (relegated)
- Website: http://www.chirkaaafc.co.uk
| Home colours | Away colours |

Chirk AAA F.C. is a Welsh football team based in Chirk, Wales. They compete in the North East Wales Division Two. They were previously in the Premier division of the Welsh National League since their relegation after one season in the Cymru Alliance. Chirk is the only former Welsh Cup winner (excepting those competing in the English football league system) who to date have not competed in the Cymru Premier of today.

Their reserve team plays in the FAW Reserve League (North East).

== History ==
Chirk, along with other local teams Wrexham, Oswestry and Druids, became founder members of the Welsh Football Association in the same year as their formation.

Chirk's early teams were formed mainly from employees from both Chirk Castle and Black Park Colliery. Chirk played friendly fixtures against other local teams and it was not until October 1877 that Chirk competed in a competitive fixture, although archive information from the Football Association suggests that the club entered the 1885–86 FA Cup, losing in the first round to Burslem Port Vale 3–0.

They won the Welsh Cup five times in the 19th century and were runners-up once.

Chirk won the Combination in the 1899–1900 season.

Albert Lockley, the Welsh international forward who played for Chirk in the late 19th century, was the great-grandfather of actor Ralf Little.

Billy Meredith started his football career at the club before playing for Manchester City and Manchester United.

== Honours ==
Taken from the Chirk AAA website

- Welsh Cup
  - Winners (5): 1886–87, 1887–88, 1889–90, 1891–92, 1893–94
- Welsh Cup
  - Runners-up (1): 1892–93
- Welsh Amateur Cup
  - Winners (3): 1958–59, 1959–60, 1962–63
- Welsh Amateur Cup
  - Runners-up (2): 1951–52, 1954–55
- FAW Trophy
  - Winners (1): 2016–17
- FAW Trophy
  - Runners-up (1): 2013–14
- The Combination
  - Champions (1): 1899–1900
- Welsh National League
  - First Division
  - Champions (8): 1947–48, 1949–50, 1951–52, 1958–59, 1959–60, 1960–61, 1983–84, 2012–13
- Welsh National League Second Division
  - Champions (2): 1978–79, 1984–85
- North Wales Alliance Cup
  - Winners (2): 1919–20, 1920–21
- Welsh National League Premier Division Cup
  - Winners (4): 1988–89, 1990–91, 1998–99, 2003–04
- Welsh National League Division 1 League Cup
  - Winners (1): 1953–54
- Welsh National League Division 2 League Cup
  - Winners (4): 1975–76, 1976–77, 1978–79, 1984–85
- North East Wales FA Junior (Horace Wynne) Cup
  - Winners (1): 1978–79
- Carlsberg Pub and Club Cup Cymru
  - Winners (1): 1996–97
- Ardal NE League
  - Champions (1): 2021–22

== Current squad ==
Note: Flags indicate national team as defined under FIFA eligibility rules; some limited exceptions apply. Players may hold more than one non-FIFA nationality.

| No. | Pos. | Nation | Player |
|---|---|---|---|
| — | GK | WAL | Oliver Farebrother |
| — | DF | WAL | Ryan Williams |
| — | DF | WAL | Matthew Williams |
| — | DF | WAL | Adam Williams |
| — | DF | WAL | Joe Roberts |
| — | DF | WAL | Jake Ellison |
| — | MF | WAL | Jack Edwards |
| — | MF | WAL | Josh Phillips |
| — | MF | WAL | Dan Burnett |
| — | MF | WAL | Josh Evans |
| — | MF | WAL | Iwan Hardy |
| — | MF | WAL | Regan Jones |
| — | MF | WAL | Steff Rogers |

| No. | Pos. | Nation | Player |
|---|---|---|---|
| — | MF | WAL | Aston Williams |
| — | MF | WAL | Ryan Davies |
| — | MF | WAL | Tristan Lloyd |
| — | MF | WAL | Jake Jones |
| — | FW | WAL | Dale Davies |
| — | FW | WAL | Spencer Parrish |
| — | FW | WAL | Louie Middlehurst |
| — | FW | ENG | Max Mcloughlin |
| — | FW | WAL | Rhys Edwards |
| — | FW | WAL | Harry Jones |
| — | FW | WAL | Nicky Williams |
| — | FW | ENG | Eduard Baker |
