= Corwen F.C. =

Association football club in Wales

Coordinates: 52°58′58″N 3°22′26″W

Corwen Football Club
- Full name: Corwen Football Club
- Founded: 1877; 148 years ago
- Ground: War Memorial Ground
- Chairperson: Carol Evans
- Manager: Adam Galdo
- League: Ardal NW League
- 2024–25: Ardal NW League, 10th of 16
Home colours	Away colours

Corwen F.C. is a Welsh football club based in Corwen, Denbighshire. They currently play in the Ardal NW League.

== History ==
The earliest mention of football in Corwen dates back to 1868 when The Hon C.H Wynn presented the town with a football upon returning from London. A friendly match took place in a field by the new footbridge in a field kindly given by Mr Jones postmaster.

Corwen Football Club was formed in September 1877, Mr J.P. Davies was the first club secretary, whilst Mr Williams was captain.

Corwen entered into the inaugural Welsh Cup in 1877. After beating neighbours Bala 1–0 after a replay, they lost heavily to Bangor.

The club merged with Llangollen in 1880, before changing name to Mountaineers Football Club in September 1881.

By November 1882 the club had resumed using the name Corwen.

== Current Incarnation ==
Corwen's recent revival started as early as 1966 in the wake of England's World Cup success when a new committee was formed. Success was soon to follow gaining promotion to the 1st Division from the 3rd Division in 2 seasons of the Welsh National League (Wrexham Area). This progress however did not continue however due to the retirement of players and others moving on to other clubs.

In 1986–87 things improved again and within two seasons they were in the reformed Premier division, winning the Division 2 League and cup double in 86/87 and the Division 1 League in 1987–88.

In 1994–95 and again in 1997–98 they finished runners up in the League but season 1998–99 they at last managed to win the championship. Promotion to the Cymru Alliance proved too testing for the team so they returned to the Welsh National Premier Division the following season.

In 2000 the club dropped 'Amateurs' from the name of the club, and are now known simply as Corwen Football Club.

2004 saw Corwen's First Team win the Division One League Cup after a win against Brymbo at Llangollen Town, after the disappointment of relegation from the Premier Division the previous season. They coupled this with promotion back to the Premier Division after finishing 3rd in the league.

In 2008 Corwen reached the F.A.W. Trophy final, where they lost 4–2 to fellow Welsh National League side Rhos Aelwyd at Cefn Druids ground. Corwen came through 3 penalty shoot outs on the way to the final.

The Reserve team, managed by Richard Crimp, gained promotion from the Welsh National League Reserves and colts Division, after finishing second in the 2009/10 season, finishing a point behind champions Ruthin Colts. The Reserve team finished 10th out 15 in their first season in the Welsh National League Reserves Division, and finished an impressive 5th out of 17 in their second season, suffering only one home defeat.

After the departure of John James and Andy Lewis, who left to take over the vacant Denbigh Town post, Corwen appointed former Ruthin Town Reserves manager Neil Jones as first team manager for the 201011 season, and was being assisted by Corwen vice chairman and striker Andrew Roberts.

Corwen finished runners up in the 2010–11 Welsh National League Premier Division League Cup, after a 1–0 defeat to Gresford Athletic, the first to take place at Cefn Druids new ground 'The Rock'.

Neil Jones stepped down as First Team manager due to work commitments at the end of the 2011–12 season, and was replaced by former chairman John Billington. John had led Corwen to the Second Round of the Welsh Cup, and a mid-table finish in the Welsh National League Premier Division.

John Billington stepped down as the First Team Manager at the end of the 2012–13 season, and has been replaced by Steve Crompton. Steve was the First Team Manager at the start of the 2012–13 season, and had previously been on the coaching staff at Welsh Premier Side Bala Town FC.

Steve stepped town at the end of the 2016–17 season after leading the team to a 4th-placed position in the league, missing out on 3rd on goal difference. He was replaced by former Bala Town FC player Danny Jellicoe.

The 2018–19 season saw the club originally finish second in the league, and gain promotion. After the end of the season, the winning club FC Queens Park were deducted three points for fielding an ineligible player and the club were crowned champions.

== Current squad ==
Note: Flags indicate national team as defined under FIFA eligibility rules; some limited exceptions apply. Players may hold more than one non-FIFA nationality.

No.	Pos.	Nation	Player
—	GK	(Wales) WAL	Nathan Aldridge
—	GK	(Wales) WAL	Nathan Roberts
—	GK	(Wales) WAL	Gethin Williams
—		(Wales) WAL	Sion Roberts
—		(Wales) WAL	Tomos Williams
—		(Wales) WAL	Wil Roberts
—		(Wales) WAL	Andrew Roberts
—		(Wales) WAL	Elystan Hughes
—		(Wales) WAL	Tommy Mutton
—		(Wales) WAL	Iorweth Jones

No.	Pos.	Nation	Player
—		(Wales) WAL	Elfyn Roberts
—		(Wales) WAL	Paul Jones
—		(Wales) WAL	James Davies
—		(Wales) WAL	Sion Hughes
—		(Wales) WAL	Joe Williams
—		(Wales) WAL	Rich Bodden
—		(Wales) WAL	Tomos Hughes
—		(Wales) WAL	Nathan Davies
—		(Wales) WAL	Scott Evans
—		(Wales) WAL	Ryan Billington

== Staff ==
- Chairperson: Carol Evans
- Vice-Chaiperson: John Billington
- Secretary: Huw Jones
- Treasurer: Martin Lyons
- Kit man: Gareth Bodden
- Groundsman: Llyr Jones
- Press Officer: Gavin Billington
