= Buckley Town F.C. =

Association football club in Wales

Buckley Town
- Full name: Buckley Town Football Club
- Nicknames: The Bucks, Trotters or The Claymen
- Founded: 1977; 49 years ago
- Ground: The Globe; Buckley
- Capacity: 1,700
- Coordinates: 53.178307°N 3.068419°W
- Chairman: Pete Edwards
- Manager: Dave Evans
- League: Cymru North
- 2025–26: Cymru North, 13th of 16
- Website: https://www.btfc.cymru
Home colours	Away colours

Buckley Town Football Club (Welsh: Clwb Pêl-Droed Tref Bwcle) is a Welsh football team based in Buckley, Flintshire, Wales. They currently play in the Cymru North.

== History ==
Buckley is an established football centre in North Wales and during the history of football in the town a number clubs have been the town's pre–eminent team – two of which prior to 1977 when the current team was founded, were known as Buckley Town.

Subsequent to the game first being introduced in the area around 1860 a club named Belmont Swifts was established and this formed the basis of what would later become Buckley Victoria Football Club. This team had their own pitch at Mill Lane and in the early to mid 1890s fielded teams in the Denbigh and Flintshire League and the Cheshire and District Junior League (from which they withdrew mid 1894–95 season).

In 1887 the first iteration of Buckley Town football club was formed and in 1895 they were competing alongside Buckley Victoria in the Denbigh & Flintshire League, playing on the Buckley cricket ground. In 1896 the 'Town' joined both the Liverpool & Wirral League (and subsequently the Wirral & District League) and also the higher ranked West Cheshire League. From being the West Cheshire's bottom placed team in 1896–97, the following season Buckley Town were 1897–98 West Cheshire League champions and thereby awarded the Pyke Cup. For the first time that season the league also included Buckley Victoria . The 'Town' began the 1898–99 season playing in the Cheshire League but financial pressures saw the club cease to play (and have their record expunged) – they also failed to fulfill their fixtures in the Wirral & District League.

Buckley Victoria existed alongside the 'Town' club and were similarly from 1897 members of both the West Cheshire League and also the Wirral and District league. The 'Vics' won the North West Coast Junior Cup in 1897. They continued as members of the West Cheshire League until 1900 and then for the 1900–01 season joined The Combination – when they joined the league it mostly comprised clubs from the Liverpool and North Wales. After one season the Buckley Victoria club withdrew from this league.

The 'Vics' were superseded as the town's leading club by Buckley Engineers. The Engineers used a pitch located at the western end of Tabernacle street and competed in the Flintshire League until 1909. They won the Flintshire League Championship in both 1906 and 1908 and the Flintshire Challenge Cup in 1907 and 1910. Between 1909 and 1912 the Engineers were members of Division 1 of the Liverpool County Combination, winning the Cup competition (the George Mahon Challenge Cup) in 1911. But their foremost success was in winning the Welsh Amateur Cup on three occasions: in 1906 beating Portmadog 4–1 in a replay; in 1907 beating Aberystwyth 2–1 also in a replay; and in 1911 the Engineers were again victors over Aberystwyth, by a 2–1 scoreline. The Engineers commenced the 1912–13 season playing in the North Wales Alliance but withdrew from the league before completion of their fixtures.

The next club to come to prominence were Buckley United who initially played on a field at Bistre Avenue. In 1914 they were competing in the wartime organised Section A of the Chester and Runcorn League By 1915 they were playing at a ground off Brunswick Road (where the Precinct stands). During the Great War the club were part of the Flintshire league and later after hostilities ceased in 1919–20 they were members of the Liverpool Combination grouping. United then joined the West Cheshire League for the 1920–21 season and finished in third position in the final table. In October 1920 the United, an amateur club with a team comprising ten colliers and a plumber, beat Wrexham in an English FA Cup third round qualifying tie The club finished as runners–up in the 1920–21 season West Cheshire League, but the next season they resigned from the league under pressure exerted by the Welsh Football Association. Their home country association, looking to bolster leagues in Wales, refused permission for the club (along with others) to be members of certain minor English based leagues. United then played in the local Flintshire League (where another town based club Buckley Athletic played). In 1925 United who played in black and white striped shirts and white shorts joined the Welsh National League (North) Division 1. They competed in this league for four seasons until 1929–30 – although during the previous season there was a subsequently withdrawn announcement that owing to financial difficulties the club was to quit the league.

There followed several seasons of no Buckley named representative team in any league outside of the towns immediate area. The Mold, Deeside and Buckley League in 1929 included both Buckley Alexandra and Buckley Amateurs; other local amateur leagues had Buckley Square United and Buckley Villa and other local based teams (Nant Mawr, Burntwood and Castle Bricks) as members; and a Buckley Victoria made a brief appearance in the Mold & District League in 1934.

The second Buckley Town club evolved from the previous Buckley United team. In 1936 the 'Town' became members of the West Cheshire League. At the end of the 1937–38 season the club provisionally resigned from the West Cheshire League but a couple of months later in July 1938 they successfully re–applied for membership and in addition made application to the Welsh FA to change their club colours to those of Arsenal (red and whte). The 'Town' team were twice runners–up in the Pyke Challenge Trophy (now the winners trophy for the West Cheshire League knock–out tournament): in 1937 (their first season in the league) they lost in a replay 2–1 to Helsby BI after a 2–2 draw in an eventful first match, at Prenton Park Tranmere, that included pitch invasions (when Buckley scored), a Helsby player being grabbed and struck in the face whilst taking a throw–in and a crowd melee on the pitch which required police intervention; they were losing finalists again in 1939, beaten 5–3 by Heswall. Additionally the club were winners of the North Coast Amateur Cup in both 1937 and 1939, beating Blaenau Festiniog on both occasions. On the stoppage of football owing to the Second World War the Buckley Town team disbanded.

Following the post war resumption of competitive football and during the 1950s and beyond to the late 1970s two Buckley based clubs, Buckley Wanderers and Buckley Rovers, competed in senior regional/county league football. Both clubs played their home matches at the Hawkesbury ground, Mill lane.

The Wanderers, who played in yellow shirts and black shorts, competed in the Flintshire League in 1947–48 and that season were losing finalists to Connahs Quay Juniors in the Flintshire League Cup final. The club moved up to the Welsh National League (Wrexham Area) Division 1 for the 1949–1950 season – the commencement of a 27-year spell in this third-tier league. In the 1955–56 season the Wanderers clinched the league title, scoring 112 goals in the 30 match campaign. They were runners–up for the title on four occasions in 1950, 1954, 1961 and 1966. In the early 1950s they were also successful in knock–out cup football: they were winners of the Welsh National League (Wrexham area) League Cup in 1950; and also victorious in the North Wales Coast Amateur Cup final of 1954. Buckley Wanderers reached the final of the Welsh Amateur Cup in April 1960, but couldn't emulate their forerunners Buckley Engineers from 49 years previously in winning the prestigious trophy and were vanquished 4–2 by Caersws Amateurs.

The Buckley Rovers club (who were founded under the auspices of the Buckley Young People's Cultural Association) initially became members of a different northern Wales competition, the Welsh League North. In 1953–54 they played in Division 3 (Halkyn region) and progressed to Division 2 Eastern for the following four seasons. After playing the 1958–59 season back in Welsh League North Division 3 the Rovers switched leagues and in 1959–60 entered the Welsh National League (Wrexham Area) and were champions of Division 2 in their first season. The Rovers were duly promoted to Division 1 for the 1960–61 season finishing 9th of 15 teams – this being the same league in which Buckley Wanderers were runners–up that season.

Both Buckley Wanderers and Buckley Rovers continued side by side in the Welsh National League (WNL) (Wrexham Area) Division 1 until the 1963–64 season when the Rovers team finished in penultimate position in the table and were relegated. Rovers topped the Division 2 table the next season and as champions were duly promoted back into Division 1 for 1965–1966. In this campaign they finished in fifth position – the Wanderers finished three places higher as league runners–up and additionally won the North Wales Coast Amateur Cup. Neither club could maintain this level of performance, particularly the Rovers who for the second consecutive season in 1970 finished in next to bottom place in the league table and were relegated back to Division 2 again. The team took four seasons until 1973–74 to gain promotion back to Division 1 as champions – scoring 100 league goals over 23 matches played. There was additional success for the Rovers team that season who were victorious in the North East Wales Junior Cup. During the period that Rovers competed in Division 2, their town rivals the Wanderers team maintained their position in Division 1 and but for an unplayed match in the 1973–74 season may have finished as runners–up instead of their recorded 4th ranked place. For two seasons after Rovers return to the top division they became the better of the two sides: in the first of these, 1974–75, they were both WNL (Wrexham Area) Division 1 runners–up and winners of the North East Wales Challenge Cup; the following season they achieved a third–place finish in the league (with the Wanderers in contrast ranked third from bottom in the table).

The 1976–77 season saw both teams finish towards the foot of Division 1 WNL (Wrexham Area) standings: Wanderers were 12th and Rovers 15th from 16 teams. This heralded the end for both clubs as in 1977 an agreement was made for the Buckley Wanderers and Buckley Rovers clubs to amalgamate under the name of Buckley Town Football Club.

== Buckley Town (1977 founded club) ==
Following their formation in 1977 Buckley Town continued playing at the same Hawkesbury ground and in the same Welsh National League (Wrexham Area) Division 1 league as their forerunners. Three seasons after their formation in 1979–80 the team were league runners–up to Cefn Albion – the 'Bucks' recording that campaign their highest proportion of wins to games during their period in the Wrexham area WNL top division (through to 1993). Also that season and for the following one too, the team were North East Wales Challenge Cup winners. There were two successive third-place finishes for the team in the league in 1983 and 1984 – in the former of these seasons the team, with 86, notched a club all-time record highest number of league goals scored.

The following season the 'Town' club plunged to a 15th (from 16 teams) finishing position (in what was now designated the Premier Division). With a club all–time record low 3 league wins, lowest league goals scored (22) and an all-time highest percentage of league match losses the team were relegated down a division to the WNL (Wrexham area) Division 1, effectively a 4th tier league – the lowest level of competition experienced by this Buckley Town team. In 1987, their second season in this lower division, the 'Bucks' recorded a then record of 21 wins from 30 league matches and took the second spot in the division (to Llay Wefare) and were promoted back to the Premier Division.

For four of the next five seasons after their promotion back to the Premier Division Buckley Town recorded bottom quarter league finishes: the 1988–89 league campaign equalled the all–time low of 22 goals scored and in 1989–90, for the only ever season, the team conceded in excess of 3 goals per league match played. This dismal run came to an abrupt end in the 1992–93 season when the club catapulted themselves to WNL (Wrexham Area) Premier Division runners–up position (second to Penley by one point). As a result, the club were elected members of the Cymru Alliance – a Welsh second-tier league home to clubs from Northern and Central Wales.

The 'Town' team found the step up difficult and had six seasons of finishes in the lower reaches of their new league. These included two seasons of the record highest number (23) of league defeats and the 1995–96 season saw a couple of unwelcome all–time club records: 107 league goals conceded (the only ever in excess of 100), which precipitated a record negative goal difference of 69. Prior to the start of the 1999–2000 millennium season the club relocated from its Hawkesbury ground to a new stadium at Globe Way. The inaugural season at the new ground saw the team record, for the first occasion in the Alliance, more league wins than losses. Results then improved to produce two consecutive top five finishes in 2001 and 2002 – in the former, in contrast to five seasons previously, the 'Bucks' conceded their record fewest number of goals (29) whilst playing at tier 2 league level.

Thereafter, for the next four seasons, the club produced its best run of results. In the 2002–03 season Buckley Town were 3rd in the Cymru Alliance, recording two positive club records at tier 2 level of 85 goals scored and largest positive goal difference of 51; their form was repeated in the Cymru Alliance League Cup in which they were runners–up to Portmadog. The 2003–04 campaign saw the team go one better in both competitions; they achieved league runners–up spot in the Alliance to Airbus UK and were Cymru Alliance League Cup winners, beating Lex XI. Progress continued and the team again went one better in the league in 2004–05 when, under the managership of Dave Taylor, Buckley Town topped the league to be crowned Cymru Alliance Champions. Unsurprisingly during this league campaign the team created club all–time league records for both the highest number of wins (23) and the fewest defeats (3). As a result of winning the Cymru Alliance Championship the club had the opportunity to accept promotion to the Cymru Premier league, however the club declined citing the cost of the necessary ground improvements to play in the tier 1 league. The following season, 2005–06, the team made runners–up spot to Glantraeth in the Cymru Alliance – although had Flint Town United not had three points deducted they would have bagged the position ahead of the 'Bucks'. Additionally for 5 out of 6 seasons between 2001 and 2006 the 'Town' won the North East Wales Challenge Cup and were victorious in the competition twice more in 2010 and 2013.

Buckley Town weren't able to sustain the level of league performance from the previous six seasons and in 2007 they slipped to 8th. With manager Simon Sedgwick at the helm for the following season the team's final league position further retreated to 14th position. Two seasons of recovery saw 4th position achieved by 2009–2010. The standard of the league strengthened in 2010–11 following an influx of six clubs from the Cymru Premier League (which reduced from 18 to 12 clubs). Gareth Thomas was appointed as manager and after an initial dip to 9th position in 2011 the team achieved a third-placed finish in 2012 and maintained their top half spot in the following season. In 2013–14 the squad was remodelled under new manager Howard Tweets but his tenure was short–lived and he was replaced by Gareth Thomas who returned and successfully kept Buckley in the Alliance league (finishing 14th of 18 clubs).

Under new manager Tom Taylor (who came in from FC Nomads with Thomas moving the opposite direction) for the 2014–15 season the again remodelled 'Bucks' finished 4th in the Cymru Alliance but the club was experiencing financial troubles and there was the possibility of it folding. With community and voluntary support and involvement, including a £10 season ticket offer the club survived. The team finished 11th of 16 clubs in the 2015–16 season: Taylor resigned the manager's post in April 2016 and a new manager, Ben Chamberlain, was appointed. He stepped down owing to new work commitments mid-way through his first season after having steered the team to only 5 wins from 20 matches. His replacement Terry Ingram left a few months into his tenure owing to ill health. Dan Moore who had been his assistant was appointed as a caretaker but he couldn't prevent the team (with a playing record of 6 wins, 4 draws and 20 defeats) finishing in bottom (16th) position of the 2016–17 Cymru Alliance. As a result, the Town club was relegated back to the third tier ranked Premier Division of the Welsh National League (Wrexham Area) – under whose umbrella the Buckley Town reserve team had been playing with some success in their lower divisions.

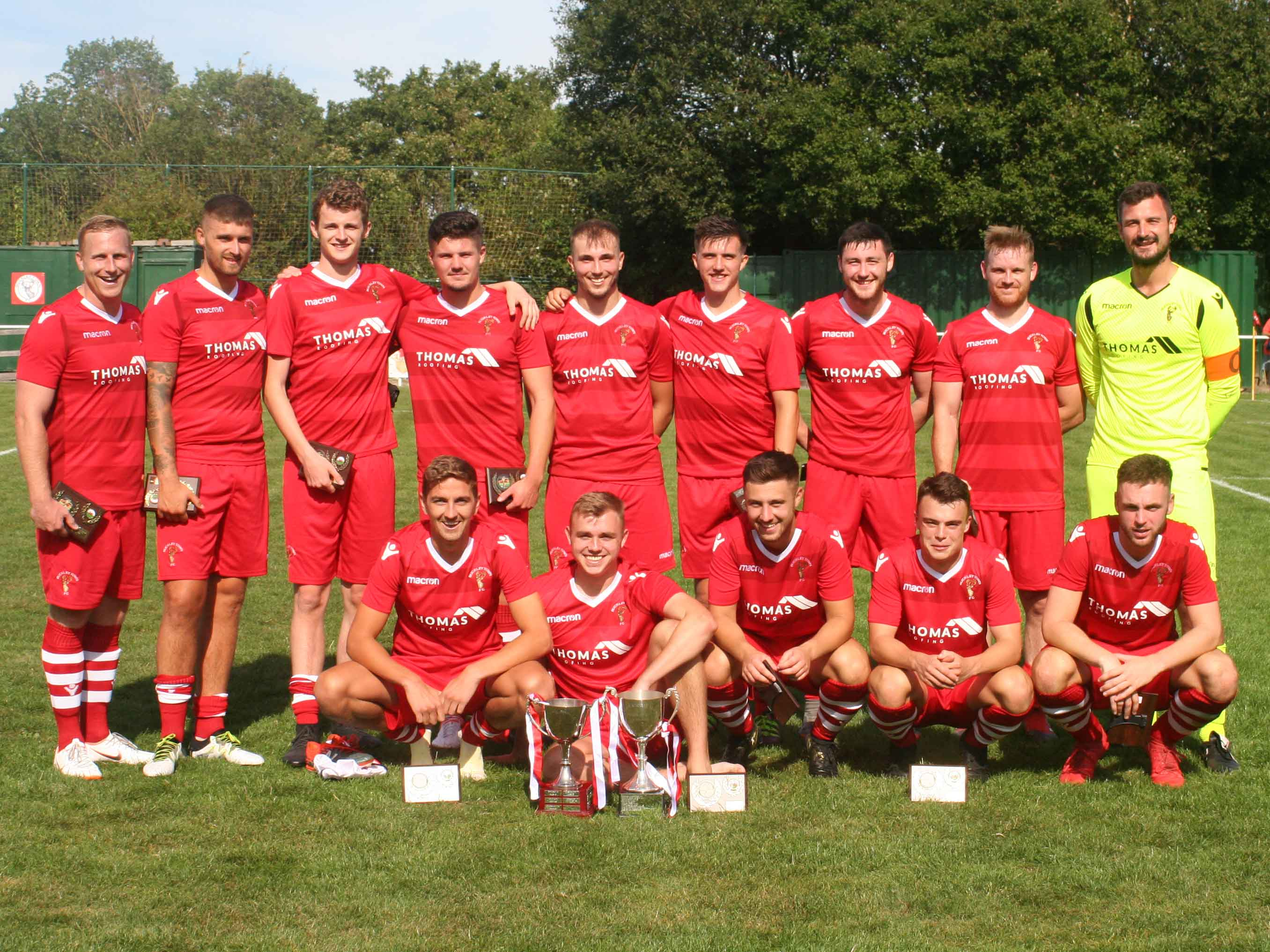
Welsh National League Presidents Cup Winners 2018

Dan Moore was formally appointed manager in May 2017 and with a team including young local talent the Buckley Town were Champions of the 2017–18 Welsh National League (Wrexham Area) Premier Division at the first attempt and thus promoted back to the Alliance. The championship was secured in the last match of the season with a 1–1 draw against closest challengers Brickfield Rangers: playing at home in front of a record 604 crowd the 'Bucks' goal was a penalty equaliser scored in the dying minutes of the game by Aled Bellis. The successful season created a couple of Buckley Town records: over the 28 game league campaign the team won 21 of their matches (a club all–time record winning percentage) and scored 83 goals, which at fractionally under 3 goals per game was a club all–time record rate. As league champions the team played in and won the Presidents Cup play–off match (against the seasons League Cup winners).

Following their promotion the 'Town' club returned to the Welsh second tier Cymru Alliance for the 2018–19 season – owing to re–organisation of the league structure this was renamed the Cymru North league at the commencement of the following season. Over the next three seasons of league activity to 2022 (with 2020–21 completely abandoned owing to the COVID-19 pandemic) the team recorded a series of Cymru North mid–table finishes. The team reached the final of the North East Wales Challenge cup in 2022 against Ruthin Town but were defeated 4–3 (with the winning goal scored in extra time).

The 'Bucks' finished in 8th position (of 16 teams) in the 2022–23 Cymru North. At the end of the campaign, after six seasons at the helm, manager Dan Moore voluntarily stepped back from this role to become head of Youth Football at the club. Former coach at the club Jason Aldcroft, who had recently left to be Assistant Manager at Burscough, was appointed manager for the 2023–24 season. After nine league matches in charge (W2; D2; L5) in October 2023 the club parted company with Aldcroft and subsequently appointed Asa Hamilton from within as player-manager. A sequence between mid October 2023 and early January 2024 of six losses in eight league matches saw the club threatened with relegation before they collected 24 points (W7; D3; L3) from the last 13 league matches of the season to finish eleventh in the sixteen team 2023–24 Cymru North.

== Globe Way Stadium ==
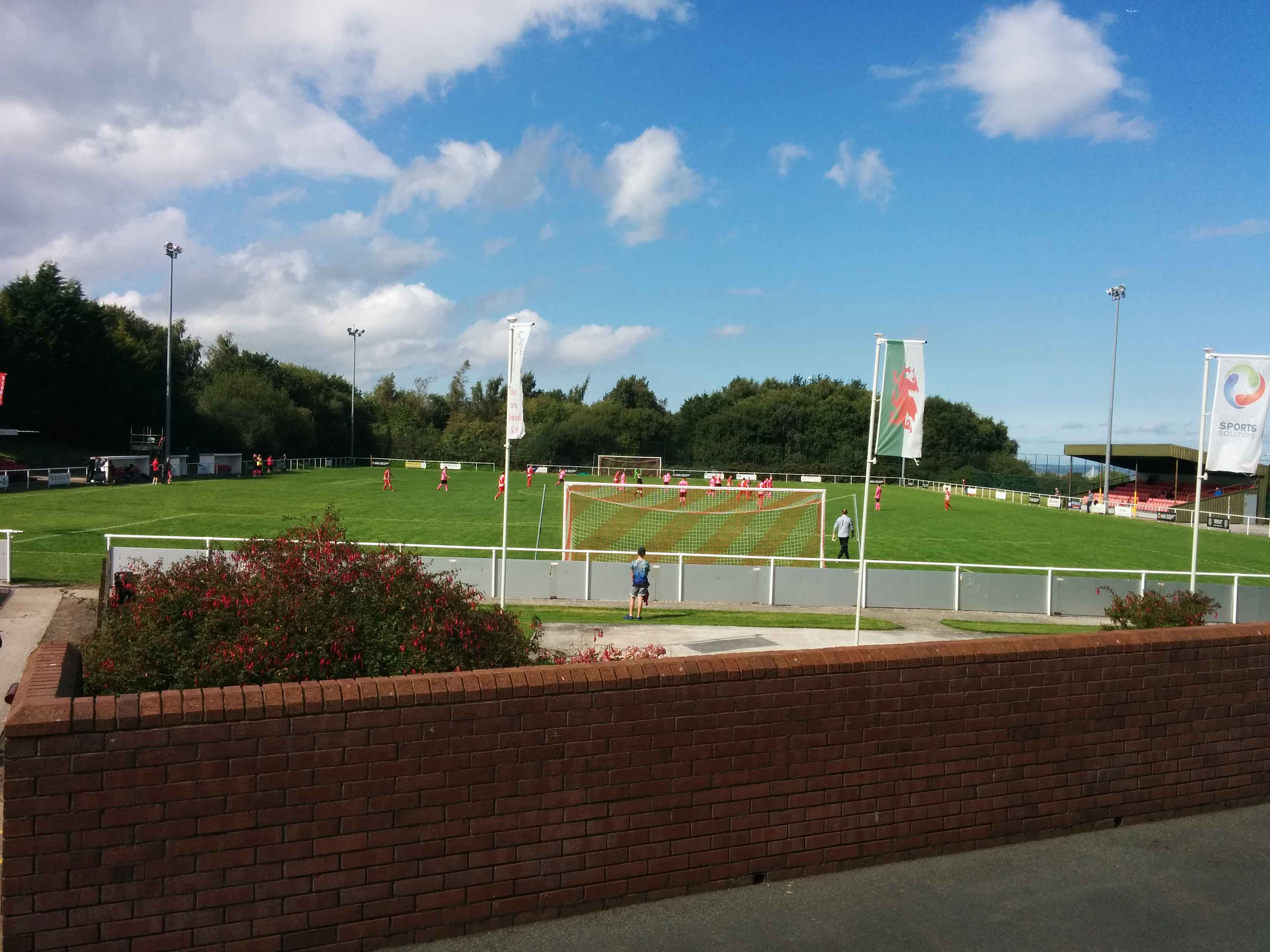
The Globe home of Buckley Town FC

The club plays its home matches at the Globe Way stadium. The club moved from its previous centrally located home at Hawkesbury (in front of the Elfed High School), to the purpose–built facility off Globe Way prior to the 1999–2000 millennium season. The Globe was built for Buckley Town Football Club with the assistance of Buckley Town Council and the Alyn & Deeside Leisure Services on reclaimed land. It is situated on the north–east outskirts of Buckley adjacent to the Etna Country Park. The capacity is 1700 with 370 seated. Wrexham have played their Reserve Team League matches at The Globe.

Since moving in the club has continued to develop and enhance the facility into a stadium: ground drains were laid around and under the playing surface to aid drainage away from what was sometimes a boggy pitch; floodlights were added in 2004; the ground was boarded out completely with a concrete path laid around the circumference of the pitch; a stand erected to provide both covered seating and standing areas along one side of the pitch; and a clubhouse erected. The club further added another stand, a standing area with a disabled access area behind the clubhouse goal in 2008 (with Buckley Town Council and the Flintshire County Council Trust assisting with the funding), a medical treatment room, a new toilet block (with assistance funding from the Welsh Ground Improvement fund) and gatehouse with turnstiles.

== Attendances ==
Through several season ticket promotional schemes Buckley Town FC have had an increase in attendances since 2015. The fan base has risen gradually, attracting football fans and groundhoppers alike. For the last game of the 2017–18 season the club achieved an all–time record attendance at The Globe with a bumper crowd of 604.

== Players ==
As of 19 September 2026

Note: Flags indicate national team as defined under FIFA eligibility rules; some limited exceptions apply. Players may hold more than one non-FIFA nationality.

No.	Pos.	Nation	Player
—	GK	ENG	Charlie Holland
—	GK	WAL	Bryn Owen (on loan from The New Saints)
—	DF	ENG	Daniel Burgess (captain)
—	DF	ENG	Thomas Dougherty
—	DF	WAL	Billy Nicholas
—	DF	WAL	Regan Nicholas
—	DF	ENG	Calum Proctor
—	MF	WAL	Aled Bellis
—	MF	ENG	Adam Boydell
—	FW	WAL	Rhys Edwards
—	MF	ENG	Liam Ellis

No.	Pos.	Nation	Player
—	MF	ENG	Ben Guest
—	MF	WAL	Paul Johnson
—	MF	WAL	Luke Mariette
—	MF	WAL	Scott McHarrie
—	MF	ENG	Cameron Meredith
—	FW	ENG	Caleb Afful (on loan from The New Saints)
—	FW	ENG	Oliver Blayney
—	FW	ENG	Lewis Hodson
—	FW	ENG	Connor Littler
—	FW	ENG	Dylan Proctor

== Honours ==
BUCKLEY TOWN (founded 1977)

First Team

- League
  - Welsh National League (Wrexham Area)
    - Premier Division (Division 1 to 1983–94)
      - Champions: 2017–18
      - Runners–up: 1979–80; 1992–93
    - Division 1 (From 1983 to 1994)'
      - Runners–up: 1986–87
  - Cymru Alliance
    - Champions: 2004–05
    - Runners–up: 2003–04; 2005–06
- Cup
  - Cymru Alliance League Cup
    - Winners: 2003–04
    - Runners–up: 2002–03
  - North East Wales FA Challenge Cup
    - Winners (9): 1979–80; 1980–81; 2000–01; 2001–02; 2002–03; 2004–05; 2005–06; 2009–10; 2012–13
    - Runners–up: 2021–22
  - Welsh National League Presidents Cup
    - Winners: 2018

––––––––––––––––––––––––––––––––––––––––––––––––––––––––––

Reserve Team

- Welsh National League (Wrexham Area)
  - Division 1
    - Runners–up: 1994–95
  - Division 2
    - Runners–up: 1993–94
  - Division 3
    - Champions: 1999–2000; 2003–04
  - Reserves Division
    - Runners–up: 2019–20
  - Reserves and Colts Division
    - Champions: 2012–13
    - Runners–up: 2016–17

== Former players ==
A notable former player is Danny Collins (Chester City, Sunderland, Stoke City and Wales International) and Ryan Shawcross (Manchester United and Stoke City) grew up in the town attending the Elfed High School

Mickey Thomas appeared for Buckley Town FC during the mid-1990s.

Ryan Hedges – Buckley Town Junior football Club.
