= 1895–96 Welsh Amateur Cup =

1895-96 Welsh Amateur Cup
Tournament details
- Country: Wales

Final positions
- Champions: Queensferry Ironopolis
- Runners-up: (England) Shrewsbury Athletic

The 1895–96 Welsh Amateur Cup was the sixth season of the Welsh Amateur Cup. The cup was won by Queensferry Ironopolis who defeated Shrewsbury Athletic 3–0 in the final, at The Racecourse, Wrexham.

== First round ==
Home team	Result	Away team	Remarks
Bangor Reserve	8-0	Holywell Reserve	
Carnarvon Ironopolis Reserve	3-1	Llandudno Reserve	
St. Asaph Athletic	1-2	Queensferry Ironopolis	
Flint Reserve	Bye		
Rhosrobin Institute	w/o	Buckley Victoria Reserves	Buckley Victoria scratched.
Mold Red Stars Reserve	3-0	Westminster Rovers Reserve	
Adwy United	0-1	New Westminster Rovers	
Buckley Victoria	4-3	Brymbo Institute Reserves	
Rhosddu Excelsior	2-9	Ruabon Albion	
Rhos Reserves	5-0	Overton Juniors	Rhos thrown out.
Wrexham Old Boys	2-0	Rhostyllen Victoria Reserve	
Wrexham Reserve	6-0	Druids Reserve	
Caersws	w/o	(England) Whitchurch Reserve	
(England) Shrewsbury Town Reserves	0-1	(England) Horeshay Albion	
(England) Shrewsbury Athletic	w/o	Newtown Royal Welsh Warehouse	Newtown Royal Welsh Warehouse scratched.
(England) Dawley Town	4-2	(England) Oswestry United Reserve	
Welshpool United	1-2	Chirk Reserve	
Newtown Reserve	2-1	(England) Ellesmere Rangers	

== Second round ==
Home team	Result	Away team	Remarks
Queensferry Ironopolis	w/o	Carnarvon Ironopolis Reserve	Carnarvon Ironopolis Reserve scratched
Bangor Reserve	4-0	Flint Reserve	
New Westminster	5-0	Mold Red Stars Reserve	
Buckley Victoria	4-1	Rhosrobin Institute	Rhosrobin awarded tie after protest.
Wrexham Reserve	2-1	Ruabon Albion	
Overton Juniors	2-0	Wrexham Old Boys	Wrexham Old Boys awarded tie after protest.
Chirk Reserve	1-3	(England) Shrewsbury Athletic	
Newtown Reserve	1-2	(England) Horeshay Albion	
(England) Dawley Town	6-1	Caersws	

== Third round ==
Home team	Result	Away team	Remarks
Queensferry Ironopolis	4-1	Bangor Reserve	
New Westminster		Rhosrobin Institute	
Wrexham Reserve	1-1	Wrexham Old Boys	Racecourse Ground, Wrexham - Wrexham Old Boys Refused To Play Extra Time - Wrexham Reserve won replay 4–1 at Racecourse Ground, Wrexham.
(England) Shrewsbury Athletic		(England) Horeshay Albion	
(England) Dawley Town	Bye		

== Fourth round ==
Home team	Result	Away team	Remarks
(England) Shrewsbury Athletic	5-1	(England) Dawley Town	
Queensferry Ironopolis	Bye		
Rhosrobin Institute	Bye		
Wrexham Reserve	Bye		

== Semi-final ==
	Result		Venue
Queensferry Ironopolis	6-0	Rhosrobin Institute	Buckley
(England) Shrewsbury Athletic	4-2	Wrexham Reserve	(England) Oswestry

== Final ==
Winner	Result	Runner-up	Venue	Crowd
Queensferry Ironopolis	3-0	(England) Shrewsbury Athletic	Racecourse Ground, Wrexham	
