= 1909–10 Welsh Amateur Cup =

1909-10 Welsh Amateur Cup
Tournament details
- Country: Wales

Final positions
- Champions: Johnstown Amateurs
- Runners-up: Bangor Reserves

The 1909–10 Welsh Amateur Cup was the 20th season of the Welsh Amateur Cup. The cup was won by Johnstown Amateurs who defeated Bangor Reserves 2–1 in the final at Sealand Road, Chester.

== First Preliminary Round ==
Home team	Result	Away team	Remarks
Cefn Albion	0-3	Acrefair United	
Johnstown Amateurs	3-2	Esclusham White Stars	

== Second Preliminary Round ==
Home team	Result	Away team	Remarks
(England) Oswestry United		Ponkey North End	Ponkey scratched
Johnstown Amateurs		Bala Press	Bala scratched
Acrefair United	2-1	Druids Reserves	
Chirk		Rhos Athletic	Rhos scratched
Buckley Rangers	0-3	Shotton Town	
Buckley Engineers	4-0	Coed Talon Villa	
(England) Boughton		Mold Town	
Flint	8-0	Ruthin	
Brynteg White Stars	6-3	Gresford	
Summerhill	4-0	Coedpoeth United	
Rossett	1-1	Brymbo Victoria	
Llanfyllin		Caersws United	Caersws scratched
(England) Shrewsbury Rovers	5-2	Welshpool	
Royal Welsh Warehouse (Newtown)	4-1	Montgomery	

== First round ==
Home team	Result	Away team	Remarks
Chirk		Johnstown Amateurs	
Acrefair United	5-1	(England) Oswestry United	
Conwy	1-0	Colwyn Bay	
Llandudno Amateurs	1-1	Llanrwst Town	
Mold Town		Buckley Engineers	
Flint		Shotton Town	
Llanfyllin	3-3	Royal Welsh Warehouse (Newtown)	
Summerhill Victoria		Summerhill	
Brynteg White Stars		Brymbo Victoria	
Llanfaes Brigade (Brecon)		Rhayader	
Llandrindod Wells	2-0	Builth Wells	
Towyn Rovers	1-0	Pwllheli	
Portmadog	2-0	Barmouth	
Llanfyllin or Caersws		Royal Welsh Warehouse (Newtown)	
(England) Shrewsbury Rovers		Newtown Excelsior	
Aberystwyth	All exempt until the 3rd round.		
Carnarvon United	All exempt until the 3rd round.		
Oak Alyn Rovers	All exempt until the 3rd round.		
Rhos Rangers	All exempt until the 3rd round.		
Bangor Reserves	All exempt until the 3rd round.		
Ruabon Rangers	All exempt until the 3rd round.		
Holyhead Swifts	All exempt until the 3rd round.		
Llanidloes United	All exempt until the 3rd round.		

== Second round ==
Home team	Result	Away team	Remarks
Llandudno Amateurs	1-0	Conwy	
Flint		Mold Town or Buckley Engineers	
(England) Ellesmere Volunteers		(England) Malpas Town	
Summerhill		Brymbo Victoria	
Rhayader	0-1	Llandrindod Wells	
Portmadog	1-1	Towyn Rovers	
Royal Welsh Warehouse (Newtown)	2-5	(England) Shrewsbury Rovers	
Acrefair United	1-1	Johnstown Amateurs	
Aberystwyth	All exempt until the 3rd round.		
Carnarvon United	All exempt until the 3rd round.		
Oak Alyn Rovers	All exempt until the 3rd round.		
Rhos Rangers	All exempt until the 3rd round.		
Bangor Reserves	All exempt until the 3rd round.		
Ruabon Rangers	All exempt until the 3rd round.		
Holyhead Swifts	All exempt until the 3rd round.		
Llanidloes United	All exempt until the 3rd round.		

== Third round ==
Home team	Result	Away team	Remarks
Bangor Reserves	5-3	Holyhead Swifts	
Llandudno Amateurs		Carnarvon United	Carnarvon United scratched.
Rhos Rangers	4-1	Flint	
Summerhill		Oak Alyn Rovers	
Ruabon Rangers	1-4	Johnstown Amateurs	
Llanidloes United	0-0	Llandrindod Wells	
Aberystwyth	1-0	Towyn Rovers	
(England) Shrewsbury Rovers		(England) Ellesmere Volunteers	

== Fourth round ==
Home team	Result	Away team	Remarks
Aberystwyth	7-0	Llanidloes United	
Summerhill	2-1	Rhos Rangers	
Llandudno Amateurs	0-0	Bangor Reserves	
Bangor Reserves	3-1	Llandudno Amateurs	Replay
(England) Ellesmere Volunteers		Johnstown Amateurs	Ellesmere scratched.

== Semi-final ==
	Result		Venue
Bangor Reserves	2-1	Aberystwyth	Porthmadog
Summerhill	2-4	Johnstown Amateurs	Esclusham Ground, Rhostyllen

== Final ==
Winner	Result	Runner-up	Venue
Johnstown Amateurs	2-1	Bangor Reserves	(England) Sealand Road, Chester
