= 1897–98 Welsh Amateur Cup =

1897-98 Welsh Amateur Cup
Tournament details
- Country: Wales

Final positions
- Champions: Rhos Eagle Wanderers
- Runners-up: (England) Singleton & Coles

The 1897–98 Welsh Amateur Cup was the eighth season of the Welsh Amateur Cup. The cup was won by Rhos Eagle Wanderers who defeated Shrewsbury based team Singleton & Coles 6–1 in the final, at Chirk.

== First round ==
Home team	Result	Away team	Result
Llandudno Swifts Reserves	6-?	Carnarvon Ironopolis Reserves	
St Asaph Athletic	5-?	Llandudno Victoria	
Bangor Reserve	6-?	Penmaenmawr Swifts	
Rhyl Town Reserves	4-?	Rhyl Amateurs	
Flint Reserve	?-5	Wrexham Old Boys	
Rossett	?-2	Stansty Villa	
Holywell Reserve	3-3	Caergwrle Wanderers Reserve	
Buckley Victoria	1-3	Mold Reserve	
Druids Reserve	6-1	Adwy United	
Rhos Albion	1-4	Rhos Eagle Wanderers	
(England) Ellesmere Rangers	8-3	Bwlchgwyn Albion	
Erddig Albion	4-3	Chirk Reserve	
(England) Singleton & Coles	4-1	Welshpool United	
(England) Oswestry United Reserve	4-0	(England) Derwen Rangers	
(England) Hanwood Rovers	0-5	Newtown Reserve	
Aberystwyth Congregational United	Bye		

== Second round ==
Home team	Result	Away team	Remarks
Llandudno Swifts Reserves	0-2	Rhyl Town Reserves	
St Asaph Athletic	0-6	Bangor Reserve	
Mold Reserve	0-4	Stansty Villa	
Caergwrle Wanderers Reserve	0-1	Wrexham Old Boys	
Rhos Eagle Wanderers	8-1	Ellesmere Rangers	
Erddig Albion	4-1	Druids Reserve	
Aberystwyth Congregational United	0-1	(England) Singleton & Coles	
Newtown Reserve	3-0	(England) Oswestry United Reserve	

== Third round ==
Home team	Result	Away team	Remarks
Rhyl Town Reserves	0-0	Bangor Reserve	
Bangor Reserve	2-0	Rhyl Town Reserves	Replay
Stansty Villa	5-0	Wrexham Old Boys	
Erddig Albion	3-3	Rhos Eagle Wanderers	Rhos Eagle Wanderers won the replay 9-1
Newtown Reserve	0-1	Singleton & Coles	

== Semi-final ==
	Result		Venue
Stansty Villa	1-1	(England) Singleton & Coles	Chirk
Rhos Eagle Wanderers	3-2	Bangor Reserve	Victoria Park, Rhyl

== Final ==
Winner	Result	Runner-up	Venue
Rhos Eagle Wanderers	6-1	(England) Singleton & Coles	Chirk
