= 1910–11 Welsh Amateur Cup =

1910-11 Welsh Amateur Cup
Tournament details
- Country: Wales

Final positions
- Champions: Buckley Engineers
- Runners-up: Aberystwyth

The 1910–11 Welsh Amateur Cup was the 21st season of the Welsh Amateur Cup. The cup was won by Buckley Engineers who defeated Aberystwyth 1–0 in the final at Newtown.

== Preliminary round ==
Home team	Result	Away team
Colwyn Bay	0-0	Llanrwst Town
Holyhead Swifts	0-1	Carnarvon United
Flint		Denbigh
Gresford	0-1	Summerhill Victoria
Royal Welsh Fusiliers (Wrexham)	2-3	Acrefair United
Gyfelia Rovers	1-2	Esclusham White Stars
Rhos Rangers	9-0	Druids Reserves
All others Bye
Johnstown Amateurs	All exempt until the 3rd round.	
Bangor Reserves	All exempt until the 3rd round.	
Aberystwyth	All exempt until the 3rd round.	
Summerhill	All exempt until the 3rd round.	
Llanidloes United	All exempt until the 3rd round.	
Buckley Engineers	All exempt until the 3rd round.	
Brymbo Victoria	All exempt until the 3rd round.	
Llanfyllin	All exempt until the 3rd round.	

== First round ==
Home team	Result	Away team
Summerhill Victoria	2-0	Green United (Brymbo)
Carnarvon United	2-0	Llanrwst Town
Ruabon	9-3	Acrefair United
Gwersyllt Rangers	6-1	Ffrith Valley
Llandudno Amateurs	6-0	Rhyl
Mold Town	2-0	Flint
Connahs Quay	10-0	Ruthin
Esclusham White Stars	2-4	Rhos Rangers

== Second round ==
Home team	Result	Away team
Carnarvon United	2-0	Llandudno Amateurs
Mold Town	2-1	Connahs Quay
Summerhill Victoria	1-3	Gwersyllt Rangers
Rhos Rangers	6-0	Ruabon
Barmouth Rovers		Dolgellau
Royal Welsh Fusiliers (Wrexham)		Royal Welsh Warehouse (Newtown)
Llandrindod Wells		Llanfaes Brigade (Brecon)
(England) Ironbridge		Chirk

== Third round ==
Home team	Result	Away team
Carnarvon United	2-5	Bangor Reserves
Mold Town	0-1	Buckley Engineers
Brymbo Victoria	4-2	Gwersyllt Rangers
Rhos Rangers	5-3	Summerhill
Barmouth	3-4	Aberystwyth
Royal Welsh Warehouse (Newtown)		Llanfyllin
Llanidloes United		Llandrindod Wells or Llanfaes Brigade (Brecon)
Chirk	1-4	Johnstown Amateurs

== Fourth round ==
Home team	Result	Away team
Bangor Reserves	1-1	Buckley Engineers
Rhos Rangers	1-1	Brymbo Victoria
Aberystwyth	3-2	Llanidloes United
Royal Welsh Warehouse (Newtown)	7-3	Johnstown Amateurs

== Semi-final ==
	Result		Venue	
Aberystwyth	3-3	Johnstown Amateurs	Oswestry	
Aberystwyth	1-1	Johnstown Amateurs	Newtown	Replay
Buckley Engineers	2-0	Rhos Rangers	Mold	

== Final ==
Winner	Result	Runner-up	Venue
Buckley Engineers	1-0	Aberystwyth	Newtown
