= 1891–92 Welsh Amateur Cup =

1891-92 Welsh Amateur Cup
Tournament details
- Country: Wales
- Teams: 34

Final positions
- Champions: Llandudno Swifts
- Runners-up: Wrexham Gymnasium

The 1891–92 Welsh Amateur Cup was the second season of the Welsh Amateur Cup. The cup was won by Llandudno Swifts who defeated Wrexham Gymnasium 2–1 in the final.

== First round ==
Home team	Result	Away team	Remarks
Chirk Reserve	7-0	Penycae Wanderers	
Rhos Reserve	1-4	(England) Oswestry St Oswald's	
Ruabon White Stars		Ruabon Reserve	Ruabon White Stars scratched
Brookside Villa	2-2	(England) Oswestry Harriers	
Cardiff Reserve			Cardiff Reserve a bye
Bagillt	6-0	Rhyl Victoria Cross	
Llandudno Swifts		Denbigh Reserve	Denbigh Reserve scratched
Connahs Quay	5-0	Holywell Reserve	
Mancott and Pentre United	6-0	Aston Hall Colliery Rangers	
Westminster Rovers Reserve	6-1	Brymbo Institute Reserve	
Moss White Stars	2-2	Buckley Victoria	
Buckley	7-1	Berse Rovers	
Llay Hall Blue Stars	4-3	Mold Red Stars	
Minera Victoria	2-3	Wrexham Victoria Reserve	
Saltney Reserve	4-3	Wrexham Gymnasium	
(England) Malpas	4-5	Rhostyllen Reserve	
Wrexham Reserve/Town Swifts	9-0	Erddig Albion	
Gresford Reserve			Gresford Reserve a bye

== Replay ==
Home team	Result	Away team	Remarks
(England) Oswestry Harriers	5-0	Brookside Villa	
Buckley Victoria		Moss White Stars	Awarded to Buckley Victoria

== Second round ==
Home team	Result	Away team	Remarks
(England) Oswestry Harriers	8-0	Ruabon Reserve	
(England) Oswestry St Oswald's		Cardiff Reserve	Cardiff Reserve scratched
Llandudno Swifts	4-0	Connahs Quay	
Mancott and Pentre United	6-4	Bagillt	
Buckley Victoria	4-1	Buckley	
Llay Hall Blue Stars	3-2	Westminster Rovers Reserve	
Wrexham Gymnasium	2-0	Wrexham Reserve/Town Swifts	
Gresford Reserve	3-2	Rhostyllen Reserve	
Chirk Reserve	Bye		
Wrexham Victoria Reserve	Bye		

== Replay ==
Home team	Result	Away team	Remarks
Buckley Victoria	3-2	Buckley	

== Third round ==
Home team	Result	Away team	Remarks
(England) Oswestry Harriers	1-2	Chirk Reserve	
Mancott and Pentre United	0-3	Llandudno Swifts	
Wrexham Victoria Reserve	2-3	Gresford Reserve	
Llay Hall Blue Stars	0-3	Buckley Victoria	
Wrexham Gymnasium	Bye		
(England) Oswestry St Oswald's	Bye		

== Fourth round ==
Home team	Result	Away team	Remarks
(England) Oswestry St Oswald's		Chirk Reserve	
Wrexham Gymnasium	5-2	Gresford Reserve	
Llandudno Swifts	Bye		
Buckley Victoria	Bye		

== Semi-final ==
	Score		Venue	Crowd
Llandudno Swifts	1-0	Chirk Reserves	The Racecourse Ground, Wrexham	
Wrexham Gymnasium	10-0	Buckley Victoria	The Racecourse Ground, Wrexham	

== Final ==
Winner	Score	Runner-up	Venue	Crowd
Llandudno Swifts	3-1	Wrexham Gymnasium	Summer Gardens, Rhyl	500

9 April 1892
17:30

Llandudno Swifts	3-1	Wrexham Gymnasium
G Allman; A Knight x2		W Harrison

Summer Gardens, Rhyl
Attendance: 500
Referee: J Taylor

Llandudno Swifts	Wrexham Gymnasium
