= 1896–97 Welsh Amateur Cup =

1896-97 Welsh Amateur Cup
Tournament details
- Country: Wales

Final positions
- Champions: (England) Coppenhall
- Runners-up: Rhos Eagle Wanderers

The 1896–97 Welsh Amateur Cup was the seventh season of the Welsh Amateur Cup. The cup was won by Coppenhall who defeated Rhos Eagle Wanderers 3–2 in the final, at Buckley. An ancient parish within the growing railway town of Crewe, Coppenhall became the first English club to win the trophy. In the same season, Coppenhall won the Crewe & District Cup, the Crewe League and the Sentinel Trophy - their successful side including George Betts (later of Nantwich and Crewe Alexandra), Ike Baker (1926 FA Cup Final referee) and Joe Foster (later of Stockport County).

== First round ==
| Home team | Result | Away team | Remarks |
|---|---|---|---|
| St Asaph Athletic | 4-3 | Penmaenmawr Swifts | |
| Bangor Reserve | 5-1 | Carnarvon Ironopolis Reserves | |
| Llandudno Swifts Reserves | 6-4 | Flint Swifts | |
| Gresford | 1-4 | Brymbo Institute Reserves | |
| Mold Red Stars | 1-3 | (England) Coppenhall | |
| Buckley Town Reserves | 1-5 | Buckley Victoria | |
| Stansty Villa | 4-3 | Westminster Rovers Reserve | |
| Ruabon Albion | 4-1 | (England) Ellesmere Rangers | |
| Rhos Reserve | | Adwy United | |
| Rhosnessney | 0-3 | Erddig Albion | |
| Chirk Reserve | 1-2 | Druids Reserve | |
| Rhos Eagle Wanderers | 4-1 | Wrexham St. Mary's | |
| Rhostyllen Victoria Reserve | 0-3 | Wrexham Old Boys | |
| (England) Shrewsbury Athletic | 2-4 | (England) Dawley Town | |
| Llanidloes Reserve | 1-1 | Newtown Royal Welsh Warehouse | |
| Newtown Excelsior | | (England) Oswestry Reserve | |
| Newtown Half Holiday | | Welshpool Reserve | Went to a Replay. |
| Welshpool Reserve | 2-1 | Newtown Half Holiday | Replay |

== Second round ==
| Home team | Result | Away team | Remarks |
|---|---|---|---|
| Llandudno Swifts Reserves | 3-1 | Penmaenmawr Swifts | |
| Bangor Reserve | Bye | | |
| Stansty Villa | 4-2 | Buckley Victoria | |
| (England) Coppenhall | 5-0 | Brymbo Institute Reserves | |
| Rhos Eagle Wanderers | 5-1 | Wrexham Old Boys | |
| Druids Reserve | 0-4 | Erddig Albion | |
| Adwy United | 1-1 | Ruabon Albion | Ruabon Albion won replay 3–2. |
| (England) Oswestry Reserve | 3-0 | Newtown Royal Welsh Warehouse | |
| Welshpool Reserve | 1-5 | (England) Shrewsbury Athletic | |

== Third round ==
| Home team | Result | Away team | Remarks |
|---|---|---|---|
| Llandudno Swifts Reserves | 5-1 | Bangor Reserves | |
| (England) Oswestry Reserve | 3-1 | (England) Shrewsbury Athletic | |
| Ruabon Albion | Bye | | |
| Rhos Eagle Wanderers | | Erddig Albion | |
| Stansty Villa | 2-6 | (England) Coppenhall | |
| | | | Incomplete |

== Fourth round ==
| Home team | Result | Away team | Remarks |
|---|---|---|---|
| Rhos Eagle Wanderers | | Ruabon Albion | |
| Llandudno Swifts Reserves | Bye | | |
| (England) Oswestry Reserve | Bye | | |
| (England) Coppenhall | Bye | | |

== Semi-final ==
| | Result | | Venue |
|---|---|---|---|
| (England) Coppenhall | 2-1 | (England) Oswestry Reserve | Wynnstay Park, Ruabon |
| Llandudno Swifts Reserves | 0-7 | Rhos Eagle Wanderers | Queensferry |

== Final ==
| Winner | Result | Runner-up | Venue |
|---|---|---|---|
| (England) Coppenhall | 3-2 | Rhos Eagle Wanderers | Buckley |
