= 1890–91 Welsh Amateur Cup =

1890-91 Welsh Amateur Cup
Tournament details
- Country: Wales
- Teams: 25

Final positions
- Champions: Wrexham Victoria
- Runners-up: Flint Town

The 1890–91 Welsh Amateur Cup was the first season of the Welsh Amateur Cup. The cup was won by Wrexham Victoria who defeated Flint Town 4–1 in the final.

== First round ==
Home team	Result	Away team	Remarks
Berse Rovers	5-3	Buckley	
Brymbo Institute Reserves	1-3	Broughton St Pauls	
Westminster Rovers Reserves	0-2	Llay Hall Blue Stars	
Minera Rovers	4-8	Rhostyllen Reserves	
Wrexham Gymnasium	3-2	Wrexham Reserves	Ordered to Replay
Wrexham Victoria	18-0	Gwenfro Red Stars	
Mancott & Pentre United	4-2	Llandudno Swifts	
Mold Reserves	0-4	Flint	
Mold Red Stars	4-4	Rhyl Victoria Cross	
Holywell Reserves	Bye		
Rhos Reserves	3-4	Rhos St Johns	
(England) Malpas	1-4	Chirk Reserves	
(England) Oswestry Reserves	8-1	Penycae Wanderers	

== Replay ==
Home team	Result	Away team	Remarks
Rhyl Victoria Cross	1-0	Mold Red Stars	
Wrexham Reserves	3-1	Wrexham Gymnasium	

== Second round ==
Home team	Result	Away team	Remarks
Broughton St Pauls	3-1	Berse Rovers	Played on the ground of Brymbo Institute
Llay Hall Blue Stars	Bye		
Wrexham Victoria	2-1	Rhostyllen Reserves	
Wrexham Reserves	Bye		
Rhyl Victoria Cross	3-4	Mancott & Pentre United	
Flint	3-2	Holywell Reserves	
(England) Oswestry Reserves	0-3	Chirk Reserves	
Rhos St Johns	Bye		

== Third round ==
Home team	Result	Away team	Remarks
Llay Hall Blue Stars	5-3	Broughton St Pauls	
Wrexham Reserves	3-5	Wrexham Victoria	
Mancott & Pentre United	1-2	Flint	
Rhos St Johns	0-7	Chirk Reserves	

== Semi-final ==
	Score		Venue	Crowd
Flint Town	3-0	Llay Hall Blue Stars	The Racecourse Ground, Wrexham	1,000
Wrexham Victoria	3-2	Chirk Reserves	The Racecourse Ground, Wrexham	1,000

== Final ==
Winner	Score	Runner-up	Venue	Crowd
Wrexham Victoria	4-1	Flint Town	The Racecourse Ground, Wrexham	1,500

20 April 1891
17:30

Wrexham Victoria	4-1	Flint Town
A Williams x2 J Pugh; G Kelly		T Bartlet

The Racecourse Ground, Wrexham
Attendance: 1,500
Referee: T E Thomas (Chirk)

Wrexham Victoria	Flint Town
