= 1894–95 Welsh Amateur Cup =

Football tournament season

1894-95 Welsh Amateur Cup
Tournament details
- Country: Wales

Final positions
- Champions: Caergwrle Wanderers
- Runners-up: Bangor Reserve

The 1894–95 Welsh Amateur Cup was the fifth season of the Welsh Amateur Cup. The cup was won by Caergwrle Wanderers who defeated Bangor Reserves 2–1 in the final, at Flint.

== First round ==
Home team	Result	Away team	Remarks
Llandudno Swifts Reserves	3-1	Dublin (Northop) White Stars	
Bangor Reserve	13-0	Mold Red Stars Reserve	
Connahs Quay	8-0	St Asaph Athletic	
Flint Swifts	w/o	Bagillt	Bagillt suspended. Flint walkover.
Buckley Victoria	2-1	Gresford Juniors	
Buckley	0-1	Caergwrle Wanderers	
Buckley Victoria Reserves	0-10	(England) Coppenhall	
Rhosrobin Institute	5-0	Westminster Rovers Reserve	
Rhos Reserve	0-11	Druids Reserve	
Overton	3-5	Brymbo Institute Reserve	
Rhostyllen Victoria Reserve	4-2	Chirk Reserve	
Ruabon	2-4	Adwy United	
(England) Wrockwardine Wood Reserve	2-1	(England) Oswestry United Reserve	
Caersws United	0-5	Welshpool United	
(England) Whitchurch Reserve	2-1	Newtown Reserve	
(England) Oswestry Rovers	6-3	Royal Welsh Warehouse (Newtown)	
(England) Horsehay Albion	4-1	(England) Shrewsbury Town Reserve	

== Second round ==
Home team	Result	Away team	Remarks
Bangor Reserve	5-0	Connahs Quay	Ordered to be replayed, but Connahs Quay withdrew.
Llandudno Swifts Reserves	1-0	Flint Swifts	Ordered to be replayed.
Flint Swifts	2-1	Llandudno Swifts Reserve	Replay
Adwy United	2-1	Rhostyllen Victoria Reserve	
Brymbo Institute Reserve	2-0	Druids Reserve	
Welshpool United	7-1	Oswestry Rovers	
Caergwrle Wanderers	4-1	Rhosrobin Institute	
Shrewsbury Town Reserve	5-0	Whitchurch	
Wrockwardine Wood Reserves	Bye		
Coppenhall Reserve	Bye		

== Third round ==
Home team	Result	Away team	Remarks
Flint Swifts	1-1	Bangor Reserve	
Bangor Reserve	4-1	Flint Swifts	Replay
Caergwrle Wanderers	3-2	(England) Coppenhall Reserve	
Welshpool United	w/o	(England) Wrockwardine Wood Reserves	Wrockwardine Wood Reserves scratched.
Adwy United	2-0	Brymbo Institute Reserves	
(England) Shrewsbury Reserve	Bye		

== Fourth round ==
Home team	Result	Away team	Remarks
Adwy United	Bye		
Bangor Reserve	Bye		
Caergwrle Wanderers	Bye		
(England) Shrewsbury Reserve	6-4	Welshpool United	

== Semi-final ==
	Result		Venue	Crowd
Caergwrle Wanderers	4-0	(England) Shrewsbury Reserve	(England) Oswestry	
Bangor Reserve	4-1	Adwy United	Flint	

== Final ==
Winner	Result	Runner-up	Venue	Crowd
Caergwrle Wanderers	2-1	Bangor Reserve	Flint	
