= 1899–1900 Welsh Amateur Cup =

1899-1900 Welsh Amateur Cup
Tournament details
- Country: Wales

Final positions
- Champions: (England) Wellington St. Georges United
- Runners-up: Llanrwst Town

The 1899–1900 Welsh Amateur Cup was the tenth season of the Welsh Amateur Cup. The cup was won by Wellington St. Georges United who defeated Llanrwst Town 2–0 in the final, at Flint.

== First round ==
Home team	Result	Away team	Remarks
Holyhead Swifts	w/o	Flint Reserve	
Carnarvon Ironopolis Reserves	Bye		
Rhyl Reserve	Bye		
Colwyn Bay	Bye		
Llanrwst Town	Bye		
Bangor Reserves	Bye		
Llandudno Swifts Reserves	Bye		
Rhyl Church Guild	Bye		
Llangollen United	3-1	Vron St. Albans	
Summerhill Albion	0-2	Broughton United	
Adwy United	1-0	Wrexham Reserve	
Rossett	Bye		
Wrexham Victoria	Bye		
Wrexham Old Boys	Bye		
Dolgelley	Bye		
(England) Ellesmere Rangers	1-5	Oswestry United Reserve	
Druids Reserve	Bye		
Ruabon Albion	Bye		
(England) Whitchurch Alexandra	Bye		
(England) Derwen Rangers	Bye		
(England) Whittington	Bye		
(England) St Martins	Bye		
Llanfyllin	Bye		
Newtown Reserve	Bye		
Welshpool Reserve	Bye		
(England) Singleton and Coles	Bye		
(England) Shrewsbury Barracks Rovers	Bye		
(England) Snailbeach White Stars	Bye		
(England) Wellington St. George's United	Bye		
Royal Welsh Warehouse	Bye		
(England) Pontesbury Half Holiday	Bye		

== Second round ==
Home team	Result	Away team	Remarks
Rhyl Church Guild	2-3	Rhyl Reserves	
Llanrwst Town	8-0	Llandudno Swifts Reserves	
Bangor Reserve	w/o	Holyhead Swifts	
Colwyn Bay	5-1	Carnarvon Ironopolis Reserves	
Rossett	4-1	Coedpoeth Victoria	
Llangollen United	1-1	Wrexham Victoria	
Llangollen United	2-6	Wrexham Victoria	Replay
Wrexham Old Boys	0-1	Broughton United	
Dolgelley	1-5	Adwy United	
(England) Oswestry United Reserve	4-1	(England) Whitchurch Alexandra	
Ruabon Albion	8-1	(England) Derwen Rangers	
(England) St Martins	3-2	Llanfyllin	
(England) Whittington	0-0	Druids Reserve	
(England) Whittington	0-4	Druids Reserve	Replay
(England) Wellington St. George's United	6-1	Welshpool Reserve	
Newtown Reserve	5-1	(England) Pontesbury Half Holiday	
Royal Welsh Warehouse	2-4	(England) Singleton and Coles	
Snailbeach White Stars	3-2	(England) Shrewsbury Barracks Rovers	

== Third round ==
Home team	Result	Away team	Remarks
Llanrwst Town	1-0	Colwyn Bay	
Rhyl Reserves	5-1	Holyhead Swifts	
Wrexham Old Boys	2-0	Rossett	
Wrexham Victoria	2-0	Adwy United	
(England) Oswestry United Reserve	3-0	Druids Reserves	
(England) St Martins	2-3	Ruabon Albion	
(England) Wellington St. George's United	w/o	Newtown Reserve	
(England) Singleton and Coles	5-0	Snailbeach White Stars	

== Fourth round ==
Home team	Result	Away team	Remarks
Wrexham Victoria	3-1	Wrexham Old Boys	
Ruabon Albion	3-1	(England) Oswestry United Reserve	
(England) Wellington St. George's United	3-1	(England) Singleton and Coles	
Llanrwst Town	7-0	Rhyl Reserves	

== Semi-final ==
	Result		Venue
Ruabon Albion	2-2	Llanrwst Town	Belle Vue, Rhyl
Llanrwst Town	2-1 (Replay)	Ruabon Albion	Buckley
(England) Wellington St. George's United	2-1	Wrexham Victoria	Welshpool

== Final ==
Winner	Result	Runner-up	Venue
(England) Wellington St. George's United	2-0	Llanrwst Town	Flint
