= 1893–94 Welsh Amateur Cup =

1893-94 Welsh Amateur Cup
Tournament details
- Country: Wales

Final positions
- Champions: Mold Red Stars
- Runners-up: (England) Wrockwardine Wood

The 1893–94 Welsh Amateur Cup was the fourth season of the Welsh Amateur Cup. The cup was won by Mold Red Stars who defeated Wrockwardine Wood 4–3 in the final, at Stansty Park, Wrexham.

== First round ==
Home team	Result	Away team	Remarks
Connah's Quay	6-0	Hawarden Rovers	
Flint Swifts	2-0	Holywell Reserve	
Bangor Reserve		Queensferry	
Bagillt	5-1	St Asaph Athletic	
Llandudno Swifts Juniors		Rhyl	
Rhosrobin Institute	3-0	Buckley Bricks	
Saltney Juniors	0-7	Gresford	
Mold Red Stars	3-1	Westminster Rovers Reserve	
Buckley	0-10	Caergwrle Wanderers Reserve	
Buckley Victoria		Dublin White Stars	
Llangollen Rovers	3-5	Wrexham Olympic	
(England) Malpas	5-2	Erddig Albion (Wrexham)	
Adwy United	0-4	Rhostyllen Victoria Reserve	
Rhos Reserve		Chirk Reserve	
Brymbo Institute Reserve		St. James's (Wrexham)	
Druids Reserve	2-2	Ruabon Rangers	
Druids Reserve	7-3	Ruabon Rangers	Druids removed for ineligible player.
Welshpool	5-1	(England) Oswestry Reserve	
(England) Shrewsbury Reserve		Royal Welsh Warehouse	
Caersws	0-5	(England) Wrockwardine Wood	
(England) Shrewsbury Railway Officers	5-2	Llanfyllin	
Newtown Reserve	Bye		

== Second round ==
Home team	Result	Away team	Remarks
Mold Red Stars	3-1	Rhosrobin Institute	Crowd of 500
Queensferry	1-0	Flint Swifts	
Bagillt	4-2	Rhyl	
(England) Shrewsbury Railway Offices	1-3	Newtown Reserves	
Connahs Quay	Bye		
Caergwrle Wanderers Reserves	7-1	Dublin White Stars	
Gresford Reserves	Bye		
Wrexham Olympic	7-1	(England) Malpas	
Ruabon Rangers	0-1	Brymbo Institute Reserves	
Rhostyllen Victoria Reserves	5-3	Chirk Reserve	
(England) Shrewsbury Reserves	2-0	Welshpool	
(England) Wrockwardine Wood	Bye		

== Third round ==
Home team	Result	Away team	Remarks
Connahs Quay	3-4	Bagillt	
Rhostyllen Victoria Reserves	0-3	Brymbo Institute Reserves	
Caergwrle Wanderers Reserve	6-1	Gresford Reserves	
(England) Wrockwardine Wood	8-2	Newtown Reserves	

== Fourth round ==
Home team	Result	Away team	Remarks
Bagillt	3-2	Queensferry	
Caergwrle Wanderers Reserves	4-5	Mold Red Stars	
Mold Red Stars		Caergwrle Wanderers Reserve	Replay
Mold Red Stars	3-2	Caergwrle Wanderers Reserve	Second Replay
Brymbo Institute Reserve	4-2	Wrexham Olympic	
(England) Wrockwardine Wood	8-1	(England) Shrewsbury Reserve	

== Semi-final ==
	Result		Venue	Crowd
(England) Wrockwardine Wood	3-3	Brymbo Institute Reserve	(England) Oswestry	
Mold Red Stars	2-2	Bagillt	Flint	1,200
Mold Red Stars	2-0	Bagillt	Connah's Quay	

== Final ==
Winner	Result	Runner-up	Venue	Crowd
Mold Red Stars	4-3	(England) Wrockwardine Wood	Stansty Park, Wrexham	2,000
