= 1919–20 Welsh Amateur Cup =

1919-20 Welsh Amateur Cup
Tournament details
- Country: Wales

Final positions
- Champions: Caerau
- Runners-up: Barmouth Comrades

The 1919–20 Welsh Amateur Cup was the 25th season of the Welsh Amateur Cup. This was the first time the Competition had been played, following a five-year gap due to World War I. The cup was won by Caerau who defeated Barmouth Comrades 4–1 in the final to become the second team from South Wales to win the Cup.

== Preliminary round ==
Home team	Result	Away team	Remarks
Bangor Comrades	1-4	Bangor Railway Institute	
Denbigh Town	8-0	Ruthin	
Colwyn Bay	5-1	Llanrwst	
Conwy	3-2	Holyhead	
Llandrindod Wells	2-1	Builth Wells	
Newtown	8-0	Llanfyllin	
Welshpool	5-1	Caersws	
Acrefair United	4-3	Ruabon	
Powells Athletic	3-0	(England) Oswestry Comrades	
Rhostyllen Juniors	1-2	Esclusham White Stars	
Vron	0-4	Rhosymedre	
Garden Village	0-5	Brymbo Green	
Gresford	4-2	Rhosnessney	
Bradley	3-0	Rhosrobin	
Llay Rangers	0-6	Ewloe	
Connahs Quay	4-2	Caergwrle	
Cwm	1-0	Rhiwderin	
Newport Barbarians	2-5	Ynysddu	
Caerau	4-0	Milford	
Aberdare Amateurs	4-1	Brecon	
Treharris	1-0	Waen Llwyd	

== First round ==
Home team	Result	Away team	Remarks
Bangor Railway Institute	7-3	Colwyn Bay	
Conwy		Denbigh Town	
Barmouth Comrades	1-1	Machynlleth	
Machynlleth	0-2	Barmouth Comrades	Replay
Porthmadog Town	Bye		
Rhayader		Welshpool	
Llandrindod Wells		Newtown	
Esclusham White Stars	3-1	Acrefair United	
Powells Athletic	1-2	Rhosymedre	
Brymbo Institute		Gresford	
Brymbo Green	4-0	Bradley	
Pentre United (Queensferry)		Connahs Quay	
Llay Hall		Ewloe	
Aberdare Amateurs	2-0	Cardiff Albions	
Caerau		Pontypridd or Porth	
Rogerstone		Cwm	
Ynysddu		Treharris	

== Second round ==
Home team	Result	Away team	Remarks
Rhosymedre	5-2	Esclusham White Stars	
Llay Hall		Connahs Quay	
Porthmadog Town	1-1	Barmouth Comrades	
Conwy	0-3	Bangor Railway Institute	
Brymbo Institute	1-0	Brymbo Green	
Aberdare Amateurs		Caerau	
Incomplete

== Third round ==
Home team	Result	Away team
Rhos		(England) Northern Nomads
Brymbo Institute		Rhosymedre
Llay Hall or Connahs Quay		Chirk
Bangor Railway Institute		Rhyl
Llandrindod Wells		Llanidloes
Barmouth Comrades		Aberystwyth
Rogerstone		Caerau
Cardiff Corinthians	Bye	

== Final ==
Winner	Result	Runner up	Venue
Caerau	4-1	Barmouth Comrades	
