= 1898–99 Welsh Amateur Cup =

1898-99 Welsh Amateur Cup
Tournament details
- Country: Wales

Final positions
- Champions: (England) Oswestry United Reserves
- Runners-up: (England) Singleton & Coles

The 1898–99 Welsh Amateur Cup was the ninth season of the Welsh Amateur Cup. The cup was won by Oswestry United Reserves who defeated Shrewsbury based team Singleton & Coles 1–0 in the final, at Welshpool.

== Preliminary round ==
Home team	Result	Away team	Remarks
Wrexham Reserve	4-0	Caergwrle Wanderers Reserve	
Minera St Marys		Stansty Villa	

== First round ==
Home team	Result	Away team	Remarks
Rhyl United Reserve	6-1	St. Asaph Athletic	
Llandudno Swifts Reserves	2-1	Flint Reserve	
Bangor Reserve	3-1	Colwyn Bay	
Flint Athletic	Bye		
Adwy United		Rossett	
Stansty Villa		Brymbo Junior	
Buckley Victoria Reserves		Wrexham Reserve	
Bwlchgwyn Albion		Erddig Albion	
(England) Whitchurch Alexandra	3-0	Rhos Eagle Wanderers Reserves	
(England) Oswestry United Reserve	11-0	(England) Derwen Rangers	
Chirk Reserve		Druids Reserve	
(England) Ellesmere Rangers	6-0	Llangollen Wanderers	
(England) Shrewsbury Barracks Rovers	0-4	Dolgelly	
(England) Snailbeach		Aberystwyth Reserves	
Llanfyllin	3-2	Newtown Reserve	
(England) Singleton and Coles	9-0	Welshpool United	

== Second round ==
Home team	Result	Away team	Remarks
Rhyl United Reserve		Llandudno Swifts Reserves	
Bangor Reserve	4-1	Flint Athletic	
Stansty Villa	5-0	Erddig Albion	
Wrexham Reserve	2-1	Adwy United	
Druids Reserve	4-0	(England) Ellesmere Rangers	
(England) Whitchurch Alex	1-3	(England) Oswestry United Reserve	
(England) Singleton and Coles	4-0	Dolgelly	
Llanfyllin		Aberystwyth Reserves	

== Third round ==
Home team	Result	Away team	Remarks
Llandudno Swifts Reserves	3-0	Bangor Reserve	
Stansty Villa		Wrexham Reserve	
Druids Reserve	1-3	Oswestry United Reserve	
Llanfyllin	1-6	(England) Singleton and Coles	

== Semi-final ==
	Result		Venue
(England) Oswestry United Reserve	4-3	Wrexham Reserve	Wynnstay Park, Ruabon
(England) Singleton and Coles	4-1	Llandudno Swifts Reserves	The Racecourse, Wrexham

== Final ==
Winner	Result	Runner-up	Venue
(England) Oswestry United Reserves	1-0	(England) Singleton & Coles	Welshpool
