= 2015–16 Cymru Alliance League Cup =

Huws Gray Cup

Tournament details
- Country: Wales
- Dates: 12 September 2015–14 May 2016
- Teams: 16

Tournament statistics
- Matches played: 15

The 2015–16 Cymru Alliance League Cup (also known as the Huws Gray Cup) is the 26th edition of the competition.

== First round ==
12 September 2015
14:30

Buckley Town	2–3	Caernarfon Town
	Report

12 September 2015
14:30

Caersws	0–4	Flint Town United
	Report

12 September 2015
14:30

Cefn Druids	1–2	Conwy Borough
	Report

12 September 2015
14:30

Denbigh Town	0–2	Gresford Athletic
	Report

12 September 2015
14:30

Holyhead Hotspur	1–3	Guilsfield
	Report

12 September 2015
14:30

Mold Alexandra	1–2	Holywell Town
	Report

12 September 2015
14:30

Prestatyn Town	4–3	Porthmadog F.C.
	Report

12 September 2015
14:30

Rhayader Town	0–1	Llanfair United
	Report

== Second round ==
14 November 2015
14:30

Guilsfield	4–5	Prestatyn Town
	Report

9 January 2016
13:30

Llanfair United	1–4	Gresford Athletic
	Report

9 March 2016
19:45

Caernarfon Town	3–1	Holywell Town
	Report

12 March 2016
14:0

Conwy Borough	1–2	Flint Town United
	Report

== Semi-finals ==
27 April 2016
19:30

Caernarfon Town	2–0	Prestatyn Town
	Report

27 April 2016
19:30

Flint Town United	4–3	Gresford Athletic
	Report

== Final ==
14 May 2016

Caernarfon Town	2–1	Flint Town United
	report

Y Morfa Stadium, Conwy

== See also ==
- Cymru Alliance League Cup
