= 1892–93 Welsh Amateur Cup =

1892-93 Welsh Amateur Cup
Tournament details
- Country: Wales

Final positions
- Champions: Wrexham Gymnasium
- Runners-up: (England) Wrockwardine Wood

The 1892–93 Welsh Amateur Cup was the third season of the Welsh Amateur Cup. The cup was won by Wrexham Gymnasium who defeated Wrockwardine Wood 1–0 in the final.

== First round ==
Home team	Result	Away team	Remarks
Holywell Reserve	5-2	Mancott & Pentre United	
Flint Swifts	1-2	Connahs Quay	
Carnarvon Ironopolis Reserve	4-5	St Asaph	
Erddig Albion	5-4	(England) Hoole Institute	
Westminster Rovers Reserve	2-2	Wrexham Gymnasium	
Westminster Rovers Reserve	3-4	Wrexham Gymnasium	
Adwy United	0-1	Brymbo Institute Reserve	
Buckley Victoria	4-3	Dublin (Northop) White Stars	
Chirk Reserve	9-0	Rhos Reserve	
Vron Amateurs		(England) Malpas	Vron Amateurs scratched
Rhostyllen Reserves	8-1	Llangollen Wanderers	
Druids Reserve	Bye		
(England) Wrockwardine Wood		Newtown Reserve	Newtown Reserve scratched
(England) Shrewsbury Reserve	7-0	Welshpool	

== Second round ==
Home team	Result	Away team	Remarks
Druids Reserves	4-1	Malpas	
Rhostyllen Reserves	2-0	Chirk Reserve	
Wrockwardine Wood	3-3	Shrewsbury Reserve	
Holywell Reserve	12-2	St Asaph Athletic	
Flint Swifts	3-0	Connahs Quay	Connahs Quay progressed after 4 replays
Buckley Victoria	1-3	Adwy United	
Wrexham Gymnasium		Hoole Institute	Hoole scratched

== Third round ==
Home team	Result	Away team	Remarks
Holywell Reserve	4-2	Connahs Quay	
Adwy United	3-4	Wrexham Gymnasium	
Druids Reserve	3-2	Rhostyllen Reserves	
(England) Wrockwardine Wood	3-3	(England) Shrewsbury Reserve	
(England) Shrewsbury Reserve		(England) Wrockwardine Wood	Replay

== Semi-final ==
Holywell Reserve	1-4	Wrexham Gymnasium	Mancott Ground, Queensferry
(England) Wrockwardine Wood	3-1	Druids Reserve	(England) Shrewsbury

== Final ==
Winner	Result	Runner-up	Venue
Wrexham Gymnasium	1-0	(England) Wrockwardine Wood	The Racecourse Ground, Wrexham

15 April 1893
15:30

Wrexham Gymnasium	1-0	Wrockwardine Wood
Hunter

The Racecourse Ground, Wrexham
Referee: T.E. Thomas, Chirk

Wrexham Gymnasium	Wrockwardine Wood
