= 1911–12 Welsh Amateur Cup =

1911-12 Welsh Amateur Cup
Tournament details
- Country: Wales

Final positions
- Champions: Rhos
- Runners-up: Summerhill

The 1911–12 Welsh Amateur Cup was the 22nd season of the Welsh Amateur Cup. The cup was won by Rhos who defeated Summerhill 2–1 in the final at Wrexham.

== Preliminary round ==
| Home team | Result | Away team |
|---|---|---|
| Caernarfon United | 1-0 | Llanrwst |
| Llandudno Junction | 0-4 | Holyhead Swifts |
| Holywell United | 2-2 | Bagillt United |
| Holywell United | 2-0 (rep) | Bagillt United |
| Denbigh | 3-0 | Shotton |
| Rossett Institute | | Green United (Brymbo) |
| Ffrith Valley | 1-3 | Tanyfron United |
| Gwersyllt | 6-0 | Gresford |
| Southsea | 6-0 | Rhosrobin Institute |
| Ruabon | 0-2 | Chirk |

== First round ==
| Home team | Result | Away team |
|---|---|---|
| Holyhead Swifts | 6-2 | Colwyn Bay |
| Caernarfon United | 8-0 | Llanberis |
| Denbigh | 6-5 | Mold |
| Rhyl | 2-0 | Holywell United |
| Southsea | 2-1 | Gwersyllt |
| Tanyfron United | 2-1 | Green United |
| Esclusham White Stars | 1-1 | Rhos |
| Acrefair | 3-1 | Chirk |
| Builth Wells | 3-2 | Llanfaes Brigade |
| Buckley Engineers | Bye to Third Round | |
| Aberystwyth | Bye to Third Round | |
| Johnstown | Bye to Third Round | |
| Bangor Reserves | Bye to Third Round | |
| Druids | Bye to Third Round | |
| Llandudno | Bye to Third Round | |
| Llanfyllin | Bye to Third Round | |
| Summerhill | Bye to Third Round | |

== Second round ==
| Home team | Result | Away team |
|---|---|---|
| Caernarfon United | 2-0 | Holyhead Swifts |
| Barmouth | 3-1 | Pwllheli |
| Tanyfron United | 0-1 | Southsea |
| Denbigh | 1-1 | Holywell United |
| Denbigh | 0-3 | Holywell United |
| Acrefair | 0-3 | Rhos |
| Llanidloes Town | 5-3 | Newtown |
| Llandrindod Wells | 1-0 | Builth Wells |
| Cardiff Corinthians | 0-0 | Llanelli |

== Third round ==
| Home team | Result | Away team |
|---|---|---|
| Caernarfon United | 0-0 | Bangor |
| Caernarfon United | 3-3 (rep) | Bangor |
| Caernarfon United | 0-6 (rep) | Bangor |
| Llandudno Amateurs | 2-0 | Holywell United |
| Rhos | 4-1 | Buckley Engineers |
| Summerhill | 4-1 (aban) | Southsea |
| Barmouth | 1-3 | Aberystwyth |
| Druids | 1-2 | Johnstown Amateurs |
| Llanfyllin | 1-1 | Llanidloes |
| Llanelli | Bye | |

== Fourth round ==
| Home team | Result | Away team |
|---|---|---|
| Aberystwyth | 10-3 | Llanelli |
| Llanidloes | 1-2 | Summerhill |
| Rhos | 3-0 | Johnstown Amateurs |
| Bangor | 3-3 | Llandudno Amateurs |
| Bangor | 6-0 | Llandudno Amateurs |

== Semi-final ==
| | Result | | Venue |
|---|---|---|---|
| Rhos | 5-4 | Aberystwyth | Newtown |
| Johnstown Amateurs | 3-2 | Bangor | Llandudno |

== Final ==
| Winner | Result | Runner-up | Venue |
|---|---|---|---|
| Rhos | 2-1 | Summerhill | Wrexham |
