= 1907–08 Welsh Amateur Cup =

1907-08 Welsh Amateur Cup
Tournament details
- Country: Wales

Final positions
- Champions: Esclusham White Stars
- Runners-up: Brymbo Victoria

The 1907–08 Welsh Amateur Cup was the eighteenth season of the Welsh Amateur Cup. The cup was won by Esclusham White Stars who defeated Brymbo Victoria 1–0 in the final, at Wrexham.

== Preliminary round ==
Home team	Result	Away team	Remarks
Llandudno Amateurs	5-1	Llanrwst	
Brymbo Institute	2-6	Summerhill	
Southsea Church Guild	1-2	Gwersyllt Victoria	
Rhos Rangers	8-0	Chirk	
Black Park	Abandoned	Johnstown Amateurs	
Cefn Albion	4-0	Llangollen Thursday	
Druids	2-2	Acrefair United	Acrefair won replay 4–0
(England) Shrewsbury (Holy Trinity)	2-3	(England) Oswestry	
Newtown North End	2-2	(England) Shrewsbury Rovers	
Montgomery	2-1	Llanfyllin	
Newtown Royal Welsh Warehouse	3-0	Llanidloes	
Colwyn Bay	All received a Bye.		
Conwy Castle	All received a Bye.		
Rhyl	All received a Bye.		
Connahs Quay Victoria	All received a Bye.		
(England) Burntwood United	All received a Bye.		
Mold	All received a Bye.		
Flint	All received a Bye.		
Brymbo Victoria	All received a Bye.		
New Broughton	All received a Bye.		
Ruthin Road (Wrexham)	All received a Bye.		
Coedpoeth United	All received a Bye.		
Rossett	All received a Bye.		
Esclusham White Stars	All received a Bye.		
Bala Press	All received a Bye.		
Barmouth Rovers	All received a Bye.		
Porthmadog	All received a Bye.		
Towyn Rovers	All received a Bye.		
Llandrindod Wells	All received a Bye.		
Builth Wells	All received a Bye.		
Buckley Engineers	Exempt until the 3rd round.		
Aberystwyth	Exempt until the 3rd round.		
Ruabon Rangers	Exempt until the 3rd round.		
Holyhead Swifts	Exempt until the 3rd round.		
Bangor Reserves	Exempt until the 3rd round.		
Oak Alyn Rovers	Exempt until the 3rd round.		
Wrexham Victoria	Exempt until the 3rd round.		
Welshpool Reserves	Exempt until the 3rd round.		

== First round ==
Home team	Result	Away team	Remarks
Llandudno Amateurs	4-1	Conwy Castle	
Colwyn Bay	6-0	Rhyl	
Bruntwood United		Flint United	Flint scratched
Mold Gwysaney Victoria	1-1	Connahs Quay Victoria	Connah's Quay scratched before replay
New Broughton	0-4	Gwersyllt Victoria	
Summerhill	1-2	Brymbo Victoria	
Rossett	2-5	Esclusham White Stars	
Coedpoeth United	2-2	Ruthin Road (Wrexham)	Coedpoeth won replay 2–1
Cefn Albion	0-1	Acrefair United	
Rhos Rangers	1-1	Johnstown Amateurs	Johnstown won replay 1–0
Bala Press	1-1	Porthmadog	Bala won replay 2–1.
Towyn Rovers	5-1	Barmouth Rovers	
(England) Oswestry	2-4	Newtown Royal Welsh Warehouse	
Montgomery	1-3	(England) Shrewsbury Rovers	
Builth Wells	Both received a Bye		
Llandrindod Wells	Both received a Bye		
Buckley Engineers	Exempt until the 3rd round.		
Aberystwyth	Exempt until the 3rd round.		
Ruabon Rangers	Exempt until the 3rd round.		
Holyhead Swifts	Exempt until the 3rd round.		
Bangor Reserves	Exempt until the 3rd round.		
Oak Alyn Rovers	Exempt until the 3rd round.		
Wrexham Victoria	Exempt until the 3rd round.		
Welshpool Reserves	Exempt until the 3rd round.		

== Second round ==
Home team	Result	Away team	Remarks
Llandudno Amateurs	2-0	Colwyn Bay	
(England) Burntwood United	Abandoned	Mold Gwysaney Victoria	Burntwood won replay 4–2
Gwersyllt Victoria	0-1	Brymbo Victoria	
Coedpoeth United	1-2	Esclusham White Stars	
Johnstown Amateurs	0-1	Acrefair United	
Towyn Rovers	2-0	Bala Press	
(England) Shrewsbury Rovers	2-2	Newtown Royal Welsh Warehouse	
Builth Wells	2-2	Llandrindod Wells	
Buckley Engineers	Exempt until the 3rd round.		
Aberystwyth	Exempt until the 3rd round.		
Ruabon Rangers	Exempt until the 3rd round.		
Holyhead Swifts	Exempt until the 3rd round.		
Bangor Reserves	Exempt until the 3rd round.		
Oak Alyn Rovers	Exempt until the 3rd round.		
Wrexham Victoria	Exempt until the 3rd round.		
Welshpool Reserves	Exempt until the 3rd round.		

== Third round ==
Home team	Result	Away team	Remarks
Holyhead Swifts	9-0	Bangor Reserves	
(England) Bruntwood United	1-0	Llandudno Amateurs	
Brymbo Victoria	4-0	Wrexham Victoria	
Buckley Engineers	2-0	Oak Alyn Rovers	
Welshpool Reserves	2-1	Ruabon Rangers	
Acrefair United	3-3	Esclusham White Stars	
Aberystwyth	6-1	Towyn Rovers	
Builth or Llandrindod		(England) Shrewsbury Rovers	Not played. Shrewsbury Rovers given a bye

== Fourth round ==
Home team	Result	Away team	Remarks
Welshpool Reserves	0-2	(England) Shrewsbury Rovers	
Esclusham White Stars	2-1	Aberystwyth	
Holyhead Swifts	1-3	Brymbo Victoria	
Buckley Engineers	3-0	(England) Burntwood United	

== Semi-final ==
	Result		Venue
Esclusham White Stars	1-0	Buckley Engineers	Wynnstay Park, Ruabon
Brymbo Victoria	3-2	(England) Shrewsbury Rovers	(England) Oswestry

== Final ==
Winner	Result	Runner-up	Venue
Esclusham White Stars	1-0	Brymbo Victoria	Wrexham
