= Cymru Alliance League Cup =

- Founded: 1990
- Abolished: 2019
- Region: North Wales
- Last champions: Flint Town United
- Most championships: Bala Town & Caarnarfon Town (4 wins each)

The Welsh Football League Challenge Cup (known as the Huws Gray Cup for sponsorship reasons) was a knock-out competition for all members of the three divisions that made up the Cymru Alliance in north Wales.

== List of winners ==
Season	Winner	Runner-up	Source
1990–91	Lex XI	Caersws	
1991–92	Lex XI	Flint Town United	
1992–93	Rhyl	Gresford Athletic	
1993–94	Welshpool Town	Rhyl	
1994–95	Wrexham Reserves	Llandrindod Wells	
1995–96	Oswestry Town	Llandudno	
1996–97	Penrhyncoch	Penycae	
1997–98	Holywell Town	Oswestry Town	
1998–99	Porthmadog	Rhydymwyn	
1999–00	Welshpool Town	Oswestry Town	
2000–01	Caernarfon Town	Welshpool Town	
2001–02	Cemaes Bay	Ruthin Town	
2002–03	Porthmadog	Buckley Town	
2003–04	Buckley Town	Lex XI	
2004–05	Bala Town	Penrhyncoch	
2005–06	Glantraeth	Bala Town	
2006–07	Bala Town	Holyhead Hotspur	
2007–08	Bala Town	Gap Queens Park	
2008–09	Bala Town	Holyhead Hotspur	
2009–10	Llandudno	Flint Town United	
2010–11	Guilsfield	Porthmadog	
2011–12	Rhyl	Caersws	
2012–13	Conwy Borough	Caersws	
2013–14	Caernarfon Town	Flint Town United	
2014–15	Caersws	Guilsfield	
2015–16	Caernarfon Town	Flint Town United	
2016–17	Caernarfon Town	Flint Town United	
2017–18	Flint Town United	Gresford Athletic	

=== Performance by club ===
Club	Winners	Runners-up	Winning Years
Bala Town	4	1	2005, 2007, 2008, 2009
Caernarfon Town	4	–	2001, 2014, 2016, 2017
Lex XI	2	1	1991, 1992
Porthmadog	2	1	1999, 2003
Rhyl	2	1	1993, 2012
Welshpool Town	2	1	1994, 2000
Caersws	1	3	2015
Oswestry Town	1	2	1996
Buckley Town	1	1	2004
Flint Town United	1	5	2018
Guilsfield	1	1	2011
Llandudno	1	1	2010
Penrhyncoch	1	1	1997
Cemaes Bay	1	–	2002
Conwy Borough	1	–	2013
Glantraeth	1	–	2006
Holywell Town	1	–	1998
Wrexham Reserves	1	–	1995
Cemaes Bay	–	1	
Gap Queens Park	–	1	
Gresford Athletic	–	1	
Holyhead Hotspur	–	1	
Penycae	–	1	
Rhydymwyn	–	1	
Ruthin Town	–	1	
