= 1904–05 Welsh Amateur Cup =

1904-05 Welsh Amateur Cup
Tournament details
- Country: Wales

Final positions
- Champions: Esclusham White Stars
- Runners-up: Bangor Reserves

The 1904–05 Welsh Amateur Cup was the fifteenth season of the Welsh Amateur Cup. The cup was won by Esclusham White Stars who defeated Bangor Reserves 4–0 in the final, at Wrexham.

== First round ==
Home team	Result	Away team	Remarks
Colwyn Bay	1-1	Bangor Reserves	Bangor won replay 5-3
Porthmadog	10-0	Rhyl Reserves	
Llandudno Amateurs	3-0	Llanrwst	
Pwllheli	0-10	Prestatyn	
Mold Alun Wanderers	1-0	Oak Alyn Rovers	
Saltney Carriage Works	2-0	Flint UAC	
Druids Reserves	3-3	Black Park	Druids won replay 5-1
(England) St Martins	0-2	Rhos Rangers	
Elan Valley	1-7	Newtown North End	
Llandinum	7-0	Welshpool	
Overton	1-1	Bersham United	Bersham won replay 6-2
Esclusham White Stars	3-2	Hightown Institute	
Broughton United Reserves	2-2	Gwersyllt	Broughton won replay 2-1
Wrexham Victoria	4-3	Gresford	
Wrexham Crescent	1-3	Brymbo Victoria	
Hope Village	3-0	Wrexham St Giles	
Buckley Engineers	All received a Bye.		
Hawarden Bridge	All received a Bye.		
Flint	All received a Bye.		
Chirk	All received a Bye.		
Knighton	All received a Bye.		
Llandrindod Wells	All received a Bye.		
(England) Singleton and Coles	All received a Bye.		
Bala Press	All received a Bye.		
Llangollen Town	All received a Bye.		
Corwen	All received a Bye.		
Llanymynech	All received a Bye.		
Llanfyllin	All received a Bye.		
(England) Oswestry	All received a Bye.		
(England) Whitchurch	All received a Bye.		
Newtown Royal Welsh Warehouse	All received a Bye.		
Towyn Rovers	All received a Bye.		

== Second round ==
Home team	Result	Away team	Remarks
Wrexham Victoria	4-0	Hope Village	
Bersham United	1-5	Brymbo Victoria	
Buckley Engineers	3-0	Flint	
Esclusham White Stars	8-1	Wrexham St Marks	
Everyone else received a Bye

== Third round ==
Home team	Result	Away team	Remarks
Llandudno Amateurs	3-3	Bangor Reserves	Bangor won replay 4-0
Porthmadog	3-0	Prestatyn	
Saltney Carriage Works	4-1	Mold Alun Wanderers	
Hawarden Bridge	2-1	Buckley Engineers	
Rhos Rangers	3-1	Chirk	
(England) Singleton and Coles		Knighton	Knighton scratched
Llangollen Town	3-1	Corwen	
(England) Oswestry	3-1	(England) Whitchurch	
Llanymynech	2-3	Llanfyllin	
Newtown Royal Welsh Warehouse	4-1	Towyn Rovers	
Llandinum	1-3	Newtown North End	
Esclusham White Stars	1-1	Wrexham Victoria	Esclusham won replay 2-1
Brymbo Victoria	1-4	Broughton United	
Druids	All received a Bye.		
Llandrindod Wells	All received a Bye.		
Bala Press	All received a Bye.		

== Fourth round ==
Home team	Result	Away team	Remarks
Porthmadog	1-1	Bangor Reserves	Bangor won replay 4–0.
Saltney Carriage Works	3-0	Hawarden Bridge	
Rhos Rangers	4-0	Druids	
Llandrindod Wells	0-4	Singleton and Coles	
Llangollen Town	2-0	Bala Press	
Llanfyllin	1-0	(England) Whitchurch	
Newtown North End	3-0	Newtown Royal Welsh Warehouse	
Esclusham White Stars		Broughton United	

== Fifth round ==
Home team	Result	Away team	Remarks
Bangor Reserves	3-1	Saltney Carriage Works	
Newtown North End	7-1	Llanfyllin	
Rhos Rangers	1-1	Llangollen Town	Llangollen won replay 1–0.
(England) Singleton and Coles	1-1	Esclusham White Stars	

== Semi-final ==
	Result		Venue
Bangor Reserves	3-1	Llangollen Town	Flint
Esclusham White Stars	3-1	Newtown North End	(England) Oswestry

== Final ==
Winner	Result	Runner-up	Venue
Esclusham White Stars	4-0	Bangor Reserves	Wrexham
