= 1908–09 Welsh Amateur Cup =

1908-09 Welsh Amateur Cup
Tournament details
- Country: Wales

Final positions
- Champions: Carnarvon United
- Runners-up: Oak Alyn Rovers

The 1908–09 Welsh Amateur Cup was the nineteenth season of the Welsh Amateur Cup. The cup was won by Carnarvon United who defeated Oak Alyn Rovers 5–1 in the final at Colwyn Bay.

== Preliminary round ==
Home team	Result	Away team	Remarks
Colwyn Bay	4-2	Llanrwst	
Ruthin Town	1-3	Denbigh Town	
Buckley Rangers	6-2	Greenfield	
Brymbo Institute	5-1	Coedpoeth St. David's	
Coedpoeth United	5-2	Southsea United	
Ruabon	2-3	Cefn Albion	
Rhos Rangers	8-1	(England) Weston Rhyn	
Druids Reserves	3-1	Chirk Reserves	
Johnstown Amateurs	2-1	Acrefair United	
Bala Press	2-0	Towyn Rovers	
Llanidloes United	10-2	Welshpool Reserves	
(England) Oswestry United Reserves	2-0	Royal Welsh Warehouse	
Montgomery	1-3	Newtown North End	

== First round ==
Home team	Result	Away team	Remarks
Beaumaris	0-3	Carnarvon United	
Denbigh Town	3-0	Rhyl Reserves	
Colwyn Bay	2-3	Llandudno Amateurs	
Burntwood United	1-3	Buckley Rangers	
Aston Hall	3-0	Connah's Quay Victoria	
Coedpoeth United	0-1	Brynteg White Stars	
Summerhill	4-2	Brymbo Institute	
Rhos Rangers	3-1	Johnstown Amateurs	
Druids Reserves	0-0	Cefn Albion	
Barmouth Rovers	1-2	Pwllheli	
Bala Press	5-2	Porthmadog	
Llanfyllin	0-0	(England) Oswestry United Reserves	
Newtown North End	1-5	Llanidloes United	
Llandrindod Wells	3-0	Builth Wells	
Conwy	Bye		
Llanfaes Brigade (Brecon)	Bye		

== Second round ==
Home team	Result	Away team	Remarks
Carnarvon United	2-0	Conwy	
Llandudno Amateurs	12-0	DenbighTown	
Summerhill	0-0	Brynteg White Stars	
Cefn Albion	1-2	Rhos Rangers	
Buckley Rangers	3-3	Aston Hall	
Bala Press	w/o	Pwllheli	Pwllheli scratched.
Llanidloes United	3-0	Llanfyllin	
Llandrindod Wells	3-3	Llanfaes Brigade (Brecon)	

== Third round ==
Home team	Result	Away team	Remarks
Carnarvon United	3-1	Bangor Reserves	
Holyhead Swifts	2-2	Llandudno Amateurs	
Llandudno Amateurs	2-0	Holyhead Swifts	Replay
Summerhill	2-0	Brymbo Victoria	
Buckley Rangers	4-1	Esclusham White Stars	
Oak Alyn Rovers	4-1	Buckley Engineers	
Rhos Rangers	1-1	Bala Press	
Bala Press	0-2	Rhos Rangers	Replay
Llanfres Brigade (Brecon)	0-0	Llanidloes United	
Llanidloes United	4-1	Llanfres Brigade (Brecon)	Replay
Aberystwyth	1-0	(England) Shrewsbury Rovers	

== Fourth round ==
Home team	Result	Away team	Remarks
Llandudno Amateurs	0-1	Carnarvon United	
Summerhill	0-4	Rhos Rangers	
Aberystwyth	2-1	Llanidloes	
Oak Alyn Rovers	2-1	Buckley Rangers	

== Semi-final ==
	Result		Venue
Aberystwyth	1-1	Carnarvon United	Towyn
Carnarvon United	2-1 (Replay)	Aberystwyth	Porthmadog
Rhos Rangers	1-3	Oak Alyn Rovers	(England) Sealand Road, Chester

== Final ==
Winner	Result	Runner-up	Venue
Carnarvon United	5-1	Oak Alyn Rovers	Colwyn Bay

24 April 1909
4:00

Carnarvon United	5-1	Oak Alyn Rovers
E.R Jones; Walter Jones; Hugh Roberts; Hugh Roberts; Walter Jones		Morris Rowlands

Colwyn Bay
Referee: Alf Slater, Llandudno

Carnarvon United	Oak Alyn Rovers
