= 1905–06 Welsh Amateur Cup =

1905-06 Welsh Amateur Cup
Tournament details
- Country: Wales

Final positions
- Champions: Buckley Engineers
- Runners-up: Porthmadog

The 1905–06 Welsh Amateur Cup was the sixteenth season of the Welsh Amateur Cup. The cup was won by Buckley Engineers who defeated Porthmadog 3–1 in a replayed final, at Welshpool.

== First round ==
Home team	Result	Away team	Remarks
Pwllheli	Bye		
Porthmadog	Bye		
Llanrwst Town	3-3	Holyhead Swifts	
Bangor Reserves	3-3	Llandudno Amateurs	
Sandycroft Artillery	1-2	Colwyn Bay	
Prestatyn	Bye		
Black Park	0-1	Druids Reserves	
Rhos Rangers	3-1	Acrefair United	
Chirk Reserves	1-3	Johnstown Amateurs	
(England) St Martins		(England) Weston Rhyn	
Llandrindod Wells			
Ruthin	1-2	Bala Press	
(England) Whitchurch		(England) Ellesmere Volunteers	Whitchurch scratched
Llanfylllin	Bye		
Llanymynech	Bye		
(England) Oswestry United Reserves	Bye		
Aberystwyth	Bye		
Towyn Rovers	Bye		
Ruthin Road (Wrexham)		Gwersyllt	
Oak Alyn Rovers		Hightown Institute (Wrexham)	
Rhosddu Villa		Rossett	
St. Mark's (Wrexham)	1-4	Gresford	
Buckley Engineers	2-0	Mold Alyn Wanderers	
Burntwood United (Buckley)	Bye		
Esclusham White Stars	Exempt Until Third Round		
Llangollen	Exempt Until Third Round		
Newtown North End	Exempt Until Third Round		
Flint United	Exempt Until Third Round		
(England) Singleton and Coles	Exempt Until Third Round		
Wrexham Victoria	Exempt Until Third Round		
Brymbo Victoria	Exempt Until Third Round		

== Second round ==
Home team	Result	Away team	Remarks
Porthmadog		Pwllheli	
Bangor Reserves	2-0	Holyhead Swifts	
Prestatyn	0-4	Colwyn Bay	
Johnstown Amateurs		(England) St Martins	
Rhos Rangers		Druids Reserves	
Corwen	1-4	Bala Press	
(England) Oswestry United Reserves		Llanfylllin	
Llanymynech		(England) Ellesmere Volunteers	
Towyn Rovers		Aberystwyth	
Oak Alyn Rovers		Rhosddu Villa	
Burntwood United	0-1	Ruthin Road (Wrexham)	
Llandrindod Wells	Bye		
Gresford	Bye		
Buckley Engineers	Bye		
Esclusham White Stars	Exempt Until Third Round		
Llangollen	Exempt Until Third Round		
Newtown North End	Exempt Until Third Round		
Flint United	Exempt Until Third Round		
(England) Singleton and Coles	Exempt Until Third Round		
Wrexham Victoria	Exempt Until Third Round		
Brymbo Victoria	Exempt Until Third Round		

== Third round ==
Home team	Result	Away team	Remarks
Porthmadog	2-0	Bangor Reserves	
Flint United	2-2	Colwyn Bay	
Colwyn Bay	1-0	Flint United	Replay
Buckley Engineers	5-2	Oak Alyn Rovers	
Esclusham White Stars	4-1	Brymbo Victoria	
Aberystwyth	0-0	Newtown North End	Abandoned due to a storm.
(England) Singleton and Coles		Llandrindod Wells	
(England) Oswestry United Reserves	5-3	Bala Press	
Llangollen	0-1	Rhos Rangers	

== Fourth round ==
Home team	Result	Away team	Remarks
(England) Singleton and Coles	1-1	Aberystwyth	
Buckley Engineers	4-2	Esclusham White Stars	
Colwyn Bay	2-4	Rhos Rangers	
Porthmadog	2-1	(England) Oswestry United Reserves	

== Semi-final ==
	Result		Venue
Porthmadog	3-2	Rhos Rangers	Belle Vue, Rhyl
Buckley Engineers	4-3	Aberystwyth	Newtown

== Final ==
Winner	Result	Runner-up	Venue
Buckley Engineers	2-2	Porthmadog	Welshpool
Buckley Engineers	3-1 (Replay)	Porthmadog	Welshpool
