= 1906–07 Welsh Amateur Cup =

1906-07 Welsh Amateur Cup
Tournament details
- Country: Wales
- Teams: 44

Final positions
- Champions: Buckley Engineers
- Runners-up: Aberystwyth

The 1906–07 Welsh Amateur Cup was the seventeenth season of the Welsh Amateur Cup. The cup was won by Buckley Engineers who defeated Aberystwyth 2–1 in a replayed final at Newtown.

== Preliminary round ==
Home team	Result	Away team	Remarks
Flint United	w/o	Sandycroft Artillery	
Rhuddlan Conservative	w/o	Rhyl Church Guild	
Rhyl Victoria	2-2	Mold Town	
Mold Town	4-1	Rhyl Victoria	Replay
Ruthin Road (Wrexham)	2-1	Brymbo Victoria	
Oak Alyn Rovers	1-2	Broughton United	
Rossett	0-4	Burntwood United	
Esclusham White Stars	1-0	St. Mark's (Wrexham)	
Rhos Athletic	0-0	Acrefair United	Acrefair won replay 8-0
Ruabon	4-0	Black Park	
(England) Weston Rhyn	1-0	Cefn Albion	
Johnstown Amateurs	7-0	Llangollen	
Bangor Reserves	All received a Bye.		
Llanrwst Town	All received a Bye.		
Llandudno Amateurs	All received a Bye.		
Colwyn Bay United	All received a Bye.		
Connah's Quay Twenties	All received a Bye.		
Bala Press	All received a Bye.		
Ffestiniog Town	All received a Bye.		
Dolgellau Meirion	All received a Bye.		
Barmouth Rovers	All received a Bye.		
Llanfyllin	All received a Bye.		
Newtown North End	All received a Bye.		
Welshpool	All received a Bye.		
Llandrindod Wells	All received a Bye.		
Llanidloes United	All received a Bye.		
Buckley Engineers	Exempt until the Third Round.		
Porthmadog	Exempt until the Third Round.		
Aberystwyth	Exempt until the Third Round.		
Rhos Rangers	Exempt until the Third Round.		
Chirk	Exempt until the Third Round.		
(England) Oswestry United Reserves	Exempt until the Third Round.		
Royal Welsh Warehouse (Newtown)	Exempt until the Third Round.		
Holyhead Swifts	Exempt until the Third Round.		

== First round ==
Home team	Result	Away team	Remarks
Llanrwst Town	1-1	Colwyn Bay United	Colwyn Bay won replay 3-1
Llandudno Amateurs	2-2	Bangor Reserves	
Connah's Quay Twenties	3-2	Flint United	
Rhuddlan Conservative	0-11	Mold Town	
Esclusham White Stars	7-0	Broughton United	
Burntwood United	5-1	Ruthin Road (Wrexham)	
(England) Weston Rhyn	0-0	Ruabon	Weston Rhyn scratched
Acrefair United	3-1	Johnstown Amateurs	
Welshpool	1-1	Newtown North End	
Llanidloes United	2-2	Llanfyllin	
Llandrindod Wells	Received a Bye.		
Buckley Engineers	Exempt until the Third Round.		
Porthmadog	Exempt until the Third Round.		
Aberystwyth	Exempt until the Third Round.		
Rhos Rangers	Exempt until the Third Round.		
Chirk	Exempt until the Third Round.		
(England) Oswestry United Reserves	Exempt until the Third Round.		
Royal Welsh Warehouse (Newtown)	Exempt until the Third Round.		
Holyhead Swifts	Exempt until the Third Round.		

== Second round ==
Home team	Result	Away team	Remarks
Mold Town	2-1	Connah's Quay Twenties	
Esclusham White Stars	1-0	Burntwood United	
Ruabon	1-0	Acrefair United	
Bala Press	1-0	Festiniog Town	
Barmouth Rovers	8-2	Dolgellau Meirion	
Llanfyllin	5-0	Newtown North End	
Llanrwst	4-0	Bangor Reserves	
Bala Press	w/o	Festiniog Town	

== Third round ==
Home team	Result	Away team	Remarks
Llanrwst	2-2	Holyhead Swifts	
Porthmadog	2-1	Bala Press	
Llandrindod Wells	3-2	Royal Welsh Warehouse (Newtown)	
Mold Town	1-2	Buckley Engineers	
Esclusham White Stars	2-1	Rhos Rangers	
Ruabon	8-0	Chirk	
Llanfyllin	2-0	(England) Oswestry United Reserves	
Barmouth Rovers	0-1	Aberystwyth	

== Fourth round ==
Home team	Result	Away team	Remarks
Esclusham White Stars	0-0	Ruabon	
Aberystwyth	2-2	Porthmadog	
Aberystwyth	3-0	Porthmadog	Replay
Llanfyllin	0-0	Holyhead Swifts	
Holyhead Swifts	5-2	Llanfyllin	Replay
Llandrindod Wells	?-4	Buckley Engineers	

== Semi-final ==
	Result		Venue
Buckley Engineers	2-1	Ruabon	Gwersyllt
Holyhead Swifts	1-1	Aberystwyth	Bangor
Aberystwyth	2-0 (Replay)	Holyhead Swifts	Porthmadog

== Final ==
Winners	Result	Runner-up	Venue	Crowd
Buckley Engineers	2-2	Aberystwyth	North End Ground, Newtown	
Buckley Engineers	2-1 (Replay)	Aberystwyth	Newtown	1,500
