= Northern Nomads F.C. =

English former football club, based in NW England

Northern Nomads
- Full name: Northern Nomads Football Club
- Founded: 1902 & 1951
- Dissolved: 1939 & 1985
- Ground: None
Traditional colours	1950s colours

Northern Nomads F.C. was an English football club primarily based in the Manchester and Liverpool areas. Established in 1902, they were known as the "Nomads" or "Roaming Brigade" as they never possessed a home ground.

== History ==
The club was founded in 1902 in Blackburn as an "occasional" club, with players representing them from the best of the local amateur teams. They were focussed generally in the cities of Liverpool and Manchester, though had no official home ground, and played at various venues in the area. They generally played a schedule of friendly matches against established clubs, including in various cup competitions including the FA Cup, FA Amateur Cup, Manchester Senior Cup and the Cheshire Senior Cup. They were basically fielding two distinct sides - a top class side that played in the major ties, and a side containing more modest amateur players from the Manchester and Wigan areas. In 1908 Northern Nomads became founder members of the Amateur Alliance League, which ran for 2 seasons.

In 1913–14 the club reached the final of the FA Amateur Cup, losing 1–0 to Bishop Auckland. After World War I the club was groundsharing with Glossop North End. In 1924–25 they reached the semi-finals, and the following season reached the final for a second time, defeating Stockton 7–1. In 1926–27 they received a bye to the first round of the FA Cup, due to their previous exploits in the Amateur Cup, but lost the tie 4–1 to Crewe Alexandra. They also competed in Welsh competitions, playing in both the Welsh Cup and Welsh Amateur Cup. The latter competition they won on two occasions, firstly in 1921 and again in 1925.

In 1933 they again joined a league, this time the Lancashire Combination, but after several seasons struggling, left after finishing bottom of the league in 1937–38. The Reserve side had joined the Liverpool County Combination playing at Burscough FC before also resigning in 1938. A further season of friendlies was played before they officially disbanded in 1939.

The club reformed in 1951, playing at Stalybridge Celtic's Bower Fold ground. In 1956 they joined the Mid-Cheshire League, which they won in their first season. They then moved up to Division Two of the Lancashire Combination, in which they played until 1964, joining the Manchester League, now playing at Witton Albion. The reserves also joined the Manchester League in 1967. The club folded again in 1985.

== 2019 revival ==
There was an attempt to revive the club and relaunch it in time for 2019/20 season, and it was announced that they would share Prestwich Heys Adie Moran Park ground. However, when the arrangements were not completed in time, Nomads were forced to search for an alternative ground. The project was shelved in 2020.

== Colours ==
The club's usual outfit was black jerseys with red facings, white knickers, black socks with white tops. For foreign tours it sometimes adopted a different scheme:

- 1905: white shirts, black knickers
- 1911: light blue shirts, white knickers, black stockings with white turnover
- 1914: black, white, and red hooped jerseys, white knickers, black stockings with white turnover,

The black, red, and white hooped design was kept on for the 1914–15 season. The 1951 incarnation originally wore amber shirts and white shorts but soon re-adopted the black/red/white shirts.

== Ground ==
The original club occasionally borrowed club grounds when it needed to have "home" games in competitions; in 1911–12 it used Prenton Park, with the Fallowfield ground reserved for important matches, in 1913–14 it used the home of Eccles Borough, and in 1914–15 played at Docks Station in Birkenhead. The 1951 revival left Bower Fold for the Belle Vue Stadium by 1957.

== Honours ==
- Amateur Alliance
  - Champions 1908–09
- Welsh Amateur Cup
  - Winners 1920–21, 1924–25
- FA Amateur Cup
  - Winners 1925–26
- Mid-Cheshire League
  - Champions 1956–57
- Manchester League Division One
  - Champions 1978–1979

== Records ==
- FA Cup
  - First Round 1926–27

== See also ==
- Northern Nomads F.C. players
