= Carnarvon United F.C. =

Former association football club in Wales

Carnarvon United
- Full name: Carnarvon United Football Club
- Nickname(s): Yellow Ones, Canaries
- Founded: August 1906
- Dissolved: 1914 replaced in 1919 by Caernarvon Athletic following World War I
- Ground: The Oval
- 1914: North Wales Coast League Division 1 (10th of 10)

Carnarvon United Football Club was a football team from Caernarfon, Gwynedd. The club was formed in 1906 after a merger by Caernarvon Celts and Caernarvon RWF (Royal Welsh Fusiliers). In 1909 the club won both the Welsh and North Wales Amateur Cups. The club also played in the Welsh Cup. After World War I, the demobilised United players formed a new club (Caernarvon Athletic), a precursor of the current club Caernarfon Town.

== Colours ==
Early years	April 1909	August 1910

== Seasons ==
Season	League	Played	Won	Drew	Lost	Points	Position	Remarks
1906–07	North Wales Coast League Division 1	12	5	3	4	13	3	
1907–08	North Wales Coast League Division 1	19	8	2	9	16*	8	2 points deducted. Match v Llanrwst Town not played.
1908–09	North Wales Coast League Division 1	20	12	4	4	28	2	
1909–10	North Wales Coast League Division 1	18	12	1	5	25	2	
1910–11	North Wales Coast League Division 1	18	12	2	4	26	2	
1911–12	North Wales Coast League Division 1	20	15	1	4	31	1	
1912–13	North Wales Coast League Division 1	20	14	0	6	28	2	
1913–14	North Wales Coast League Division 1	17	5	0	13	10	10	Match v Llanrwst Town not played.

== Cup History ==
Season	Competition	Round	Opposition	Score	Notes
1908–09	Welsh Amateur Cup	First Round	Beaumaris	3–0	
1908–09	Welsh Amateur Cup	Second Round	Conwy	2–0	
1908–09	Welsh Amateur Cup	Third Round	Bangor Reserves	3–1	
1908–09	Welsh Amateur Cup	Fourth Round	Llandudno Amateurs	1–0	
1908–09	Welsh Amateur Cup	Semi Final	Aberystwyth	1–1	
1908–09	Welsh Amateur Cup	Semi Final Replay	Aberystwyth	2–1	
1908–09	Welsh Amateur Cup	Final	Oak Alyn Rovers	5–1	Played at Colwyn Bay
1908–09	North Wales Amateur Cup	First Round	Pwllheli	14–0	
1908–09	North Wales Amateur Cup	Semi Final	Beaumaris	2–2	Played at Bangor
1908–09	North Wales Amateur Cup	Semi Final Replay	Beaumaris	2–2	Played at Bangor
1908–09	North Wales Amateur Cup	Semi Final Second Replay	Beaumaris	1–0	Played at Bangor
1908–09	North Wales Amateur Cup	Final	Conwy	1–0	Played at Bangor
1909–10	Welsh Cup	Preliminary Round	Llandudno Amateurs	2–0	
1909–10	Welsh Cup	First Round	Beaumaris	10–1	
1909–10	Welsh Cup	Second Round	Rhyl	1–2	
1909–10	Welsh Amateur Cup	Third Round	Llandudno Amateurs	w/o	Carnarvon United withdrew
1910–11	Welsh Cup	Second Round	Llandudno Amateurs	2–2	
1910–11	Welsh Cup	Second Round Replay	Llandudno Amateurs	2–2	
1910–11	Welsh Cup	Second Round Second Replay	Llandudno Amateurs	2–5	
1911–12	Welsh Cup	Preliminary Round	Llanberis United	1–1	
1911–12	Welsh Cup	Preliminary Round Replay	Llanberis United	6–2	
1911–12	Welsh Cup	First Round	Holyhead Swifts	0–2	
1912–13	Welsh Cup	Preliminary Round	Llandudno Amateurs	4–0	
1912–13	Welsh Cup	Preliminary Round Replay	Llandudno Amateurs	Abandoned	
1912–13	Welsh Cup	Preliminary Round Second Replay	Llandudno Amateurs	2–2. 3–2 AET	
1912–13	Welsh Cup	First Round	Holyhead Swifts	0–2	
1913–14	Welsh Cup	Second Preliminary Round	Holyhead Swifts	1–2	

== Honours ==
=== League ===
- North Wales Coast League Division 1

Winners : 1912
Runners-up : 1909, 1910, 1911, 1913

=== Cup ===
- Welsh Amateur Cup

Winners : 1909

- North Wales Amateur Cup

Winners : 1909, 1911
