= FAW Trophy =

- Founded: 1890; 136 years ago
- Region: Wales
- Current champions: Bangor City 1876 (2025–26)
- Most championships: Cardiff Corinthians (6 titles)

The FAW Welsh Trophy is a knock-out football competition contested annually by teams from Wales and the borders.

The Football Association of Wales is the organising body of this competition, which has been run every year since its inception in 1890–91 (except during the two World Wars and the COVID-19 pandemic) for clubs competing in the lower echelons of the Welsh football league system.

It was known as the Welsh Junior Cup until 1902, when it became the Welsh Amateur Cup, a title it held until 1974, when it was renamed the FAW Intermediate Cup. The competition took its current title in 1993.

== Eligible clubs ==
In order to play in this competition a club must compete at Level 3 or below of the Welsh football league system.

Teams playing in and below the Ardal Leagues are eligible to enter.

All applying clubs must also meet the Competition Ground Criteria requirements.

== Winners from outside Wales ==
Just like the Welsh Cup, the FAW Trophy was once open to clubs from the Marches and an English club took the trophy out of Wales on nine occasions:

- 1897: Coppenhall (Staffordshire)
- 1899: Oswestry United Reserves (Shropshire)
- 1900: Wellington St Georges United (Shropshire)
- 1921: Northern Nomads (Manchester)
- 1925: Northern Nomads (Manchester)
- 1964: Donnington Wood (Shropshire)
- 1971: Bridgnorth Town (Shropshire)
- 1974: Whitchurch Alport (Shropshire)
- 1975: Donnington Wood (Shropshire)

== Winners ==
Season	Winners	Score	Runners-up	Other Info	Venue for final
Welsh Junior Cup
1890–91	Wrexham Victoria	4–1	Flint Town		Racecourse Ground, Wrexham
1891–92	Llandudno Swifts	2–1	Wrexham Gymnasium		Summer Gardens, Rhyl
1892–93	Wrexham Gymnasium	1–0	(England) Wrockwardine Wood		Racecourse Ground, Wrexham
1893–94	Mold Red Stars	4–3	(England) Wrockwardine Wood		Stansty Park, Wrexham
1894–95	Caergwrle Wanderers	2–1	Bangor Reserves		Flint
1895–96	Queensferry Ironopolis	3–0	(England) Shrewsbury Athletic		Racecourse Ground, Wrexham
1896–97	(England) Coppenhall	3–2	Rhos Eagle Wanderers		Buckley
1897–98	Rhos Eagle Wanderers	6–1	(England) Singleton & Coles		Chirk
1898–99	(England) Oswestry United Reserves	1–0	(England) Singleton & Coles		Welshpool
1899–1900	(England) Wellington St. Georges United	2–0	Llanrwst Town		Flint
1900–01	Wrexham Victoria	1–0	(England) Singleton & Coles		Racecourse Ground, Wrexham
1901–02	Wrexham Victoria	1–0	Machynlleth Town		Oswestry United Ground, Oswestry
Welsh Amateur Cup
1902–03	Druids Reserves	4–0	Bangor Reserves		Racecourse Ground, Wrexham
1903–04	Wrexham Victoria	4–2	Druids Reserves		Oswestry
1904–05	Esclusham White Stars	4–0	Bangor Reserves		Wrexham
1905–06	Buckley Engineers	3–1	Porthmadog	Replay; first game ended 2–2	Welshpool
1906–07	Buckley Engineers	2–1	Aberystwyth	Replay; first game ended 2–2	Newtown
1907–08	Esclusham White Stars	1–0	Brymbo Victoria		Wrexham
1908–09	Caernarfon United	5–1	Oak Alyn Rovers		Colwyn Bay
1909–10	Johnstown Amateurs	2-1	Bangor Reserves		Sealand Road, Chester
1910–11	Buckley Engineers	1–0	Aberystwyth Town		Newtown
1911–12	Rhosllanerchrugog	2–1	Summerhill	Replay; first game ended 1–1	
1912–13	Johnstown Amateurs	3–1	Aberaman Athletic		
1913–14	Cardiff Corinthians	1–0	Holywell Town		Newtown
1914–19	No competition				
1919–20	Caerau	4–1	Barmouth Comrades		
1920–21	(England) Northern Nomads	1–1	Llanidloes United		
1921–22	Llanidloes Town F.C.	3–1	U.C.W. Aberystwyth		
1922–23	Acrefair United	1–0	Lovell's Athletic		
1923–24	Denbigh Town	2–1	Lovell's Athletic		
1924–25	(England) Northern Nomads	5–1	Llanidloes United	Replay; first game ended 1–1	
1925–26	Lovell's Athletic	2–0	Holywell United		
1926–27	Lovell's Athletic	2–0	Holywell United		
1927–28	Lovell's Athletic	1–0	Llanidloes United		
1928–29	Cardiff Corinthians	2–0	Aberystwyth Town		
1929–30	Cardiff Corinthians	4–3	Burntwood		
1930–31	Aberystwyth Town	5–1	Llanfairfechan		
1931–32	Machynlleth	3–0	Cardiff Corinthians		The Smithfield enclosure, Aberystwyth
1932–33	Aberystwyth Town	4–1	Llanidloes United		
1933–34	Cardiff Corinthians	2–1	Llanidloes United		
1934–35	Aberdyfi	2–1	Aberystwyth Town		
1935–36	Llay Welfare	3–1	Treharris Athletic	Replay; first game ended 1–1	
1936–37	Treharris Athletic	2–1	Llandudno		
1937–38	Abercynon Athletic	2–1	(England) Wem Town	Replay; first game ended 1–1	
1938–39	Caerau Athletic	1–0	Lovell's Athletic		
1939–40	Abercynon Athletic	3–0	Flint Athletic		
1940–45	No competition				
1945–46	Caerau Athletic	5–1	Llay United		
1946–47	Troedyrhiw	5–0	Llay United		
1947–48	Flint Town United	2–1	Troedyrhiw		
1948–49	Llay United	2–0	(England) Hanwood Welfare		
1949–50	Caerau Athletic	2–0	Llay Welfare		
1950–51	Treharris Athletic	3–1	Connahs Quay Juniors		
1951–52	Ton Pentre	6–2	Chirk AAA		
1952–53	Connahs Quay Nomads	3–2	Caersws		
1953–54	Lovell's Athletic	3–2	Overton St. Mary's		
1954–55	Newtown	4–2	Chirk AAA		
1955–56	Porthmadog	5–2	(England) Peritus		
1956–57	Porthmadog	5–2	Druids United	Replay; first game ended 2–2	
1957–58	55th Royal Artillery Tonfannau	3–1	Porthmadog		
1958–59	Chirk AAA	2–0	(England) Whitchurch Alport	Replay; first game ended 2–2	
1959–60	Chirk AAA	3–2	Caerau Athletic		
1960–61	Caersws	4–2	Buckley Wanderers		
1961–62	Cardiff Corinthians	3–2	Holywell Town		
1962–63	Chirk AAA	2–0	Caersws		
1963–64	(England) Donnington Wood	2–1	Caersws		
1964–65	Llanidloes Town	3–2	Gwynfi Welfare		
1965–66	Caerleon	1–0	Welshpool		
1966–67	Brymbo Steelworks	3–2	Cardiff College of Education		
1967–68	Cardiff College of Education	3–1	Welshpool		
1968–69	Cardiff College of Education	2–0	Tonyrefail Welfare		
1969–70	Aberystwyth Town	2–1	Cardiff College of Education		
1970–71	(England) Bridgnorth Town	2–1	Welshpool		
1971–72	Welshpool	1–0	Aberystwyth Town		
1972–73	Rhyl	2–0	(England) GKN Stanley	Replay; first game ended 0–0	
1973–74	(England) Whitchurch Alport	2–1	Cardiff College of Education		
FAW Intermediate Cup
1974–75	(England) Donnington Wood	2–0	Buckley Wanderers		
1975–76	Cardiff College of Education	2–1	(England) Shifnal Town		
1976–77	Welshpool	4–1	(England) Whitchurch Alport		
1977–78	Caernarfon Town	1–0	Llanidloes Town		
1978–79	Pontllanfraith	1–0	Flint Town United		
1979–80	Blaenau Ffestiniog	1–0	Brymbo Steelworks	Replay; first game ended 3–3	
1980–81	Connahs Quay Nomads	1–0	Newport YMCA		
1981–82	Conwy United	1–0	Blaenau Ffestiniog		
1982–83	Welshpool	4–3	Brymbo Steelworks		
1983–84	Welshpool	1–0	Caersws	Replay; first game ended 1–1	
1984–85	Cardiff Corinthians	2–1	Brecon Corinthians	Replay; first game ended 2–2	
1985–86	Aberystwyth Town	3–1	Newtown		
1986–87	Afan Lido	1–0	Taffs Well	Replay; first game ended 3–3	
1987–88	Aberystwyth Town	1–0	Newtown		
1988–89	Caersws	3–2	Aberystwyth Town		
1989–90	Ragged School	2–0	Porthcawl Town		
1990–91	Abergavenny Thursdays	2–0	Mostyn		
1991–92	Llangefni Town	2–1	Caersws	Replay; first game ended 1–1	
1992–93	Llansantffraid	3–0	Brecon Corinthians		
FAW Trophy
1993–94	Barry Town	2–1	Aberaman		
1994–95	Rhydymwyn	1–0	Taffs Well		
1995–96	Rhydymwyn	2–1	Penrhyncoch		
1996–97	Cambrian United Sky Blues	2–1	Rhyl Delta		
1997–98	Dinas Powys	2–0	Llanrwst		
1998–99	Ragged School	3–1	Barry Athletic		
1999–2000	Trefelin	6–2	Bryntirion Athletic		
2000–01	Ragged School	1–0	Gresford Athletic		
2001–02	Cefn United	2–0	Llangeinor		
2002–03	Rhydyfelin Zenith	4–1	Tillery		
2003–04	Penycae	3–2	Llanrhaeadr		
2004–05	West End	3–1	Rhydymwyn		
2005–06	West End	4–2	Cefn United		
2006–07	Brymbo	6–2	Glan Conwy		
2007–08	Rhos Aelwyd	4–2	Corwen		
2008–09	Ragged School	1–0	Penycae		Latham Park, Newtown
2009–10	Glan Conwy	5–1	Clydach Wasps		Park Avenue, Aberystwyth
2010–11	Holywell Town	3–2	Conwy United		Belle Vue, Rhyl
2011–12	Sully Sports	2–1	Holyhead Hotspur		Park Avenue, Aberystwyth
2012–13	Caernarfon Town	6–0	Kilvey Fords		Latham Park, Newtown
2013–14	Llanrug United	3–2	Chirk AAA		
2014–15	Holywell Town	4–2	Penrhyndeudraeth		Maesdu Park, Llandudno
2015–16	Abergavenny Town	1–0	Sully Sports		Dragon Park, Newport
2016–17	Chirk AAA	2–1	Penlan Club	After extra-time	Park Avenue, Aberystwyth
2017–18	Conwy Borough	4–1	Rhos Aelwyd		The Airfield, Broughton
2018–19	Cefn Albion	4–0	Pontardawe Town		Park Avenue, Aberystwyth
2019–20	Competition not completed - Coronavirus pandemic				
2020–21	No competition due to Coronavirus restrictions				
2021–22	Mold Alexandra	1–0	Baglan Dragons		Recreation Ground, Caersws
2022–23	Trethomas Bluebirds	2–1	Denbigh Town		Latham Park, Newtown
2023–24	Newport City	5–4	Penrhyncoch		Latham Park, Newtown
2024–25	Port Talbot Town	2–1	Penygraig United		Ynys Park, Trefelin
2025–26	Bangor City 1876	3–1	Pontardawe Town		Park Avenue, Aberystwyth

== Performance ==
=== Performance by club ===
Club	Winners	Runners-up	Final appearances	Last final
Cardiff Corinthians	6	1	7	1985
Aberystwyth Town	5	6	11	1989
Chirk AAA	4	4	8	2017
Lovell's Athletic	4	3	7	1954
Welshpool	4	3	7	1984
Caerau Athletic	4	1	5	1960
Wrexham Victoria	4	0	4	1904
Ragged School	4	0	4	2009
Cardiff College of Education	3	3	6	1976
Buckley Engineers	3	0	3	1911
Llanidloes United/Town	2	5	7	1978
Caersws	2	5	7	1992
Holywell Town	2	4	6	2015
Porthmadog	2	2	4	1958
Treharris Athletic	2	1	3	1951
Rhydymwyn	2	1	3	2005
Esclusham White Stars	2	0	2	1908
Northern Nomads	2	0	2	1925
Abercynon Athletic	2	0	2	1940
Donnington Wood	2	0	2	1975
Connahs Quay Nomads	2	0	2	1981
West End	2	0	2	2006
Caernarfon Town	2	0	2	2013
Flint Town United	1	2	3	1979
Brymbo Steelworks	1	2	3	1983
Llay United	1	2	3	1949
Whitchurch Alport	1	2	3	1977
Newtown	1	2	3	1988
Wrexham Gymnasium	1	1	2	1893
Rhos Eagle Wanderers	1	1	2	1898
Machynlleth	1	1	2	1932
Druids Reserves	1	1	2	1904
Denbigh Town	1	1	2	2023
Troedyrhiw	1	1	2	1948
Llay Welfare	1	1	2	1950
Conwy United	2	1	3	2018
Blaenau Ffestiniog	1	1	2	1982
Cefn United	1	1	2	2006
Penycae	1	1	2	2009
Glan Conwy	1	1	2	2010
Sully Sports	1	1	2	2016
Llandudno Swifts	1	0	1	1892
Mold Red Stars	1	0	1	1894
Caergwrle Wanderers	1	0	1	1895
Queensferry Ironopolis	1	0	1	1896
Coppenhall	1	0	1	1897
Oswestry United Reserves	1	0	1	1899
Wellington St Georges United	1	0	1	1900
Caernarfon United	1	0	1	1909
Johnstown Amateurs	1	0	1	1910
Rhosllanerchrugog	1	0	1	1912
Johnstown Athletic	1	0	1	1913
Acrefair United	1	0	1	1923
Bridgnorth Town	1	0	1	1971
Rhyl	1	0	1	1973
Barry Town	1	0	1	1994
Cambrian United Sky Blues	1	0	1	1997
Trefelin BGC	1	0	1	2000
Rhydyfelin Zenith	1	0	1	2003
Brymbo	1	0	1	2007
Rhos Aelwyd	1	1	2	2018
Llanrug United	1	0	1	2014
Abergavenny Town	1	0	1	2016
Cefn Albion	1	0	1	2019
Mold Alexandra	1	0	1	2022
Bangor Reserves	0	4	4	1910
Singleton & Coles	0	3	3	1901
Wrockwardine Wood	0	2	2	1894
Brecon Corinthians	0	2	2	1993
Aberaman Athletic	0	2	2	1994
Taffs Well	0	2	2	1995
Llanrwst Town	0	2	2	1998
Shrewsbury Athletic	0	1	1	1896
Brymbo Victoria	0	1	1	1908
Oak Alyn Rovers	0	1	1	1909
Summerhill	0	1	1	1912
Penrhyncoch	0	2	2	2024
Rhyl Delta	0	1	1	1997
Barry Athletic	0	1	1	1999
Bryntirion Athletic	0	1	1	2000
Gresford Athletic	0	1	1	2001
Llangeinor	0	1	1	2002
Tillery	0	1	1	2003
Llanrhaedr	0	1	1	2004
Clydach Wasps	0	1	1	2010
Holyhead Hotspur	0	1	1	2012
Kilvey Fords	0	1	1	2013
Penrhyndeudraeth FC	0	1	1	2015
Penlan Club	0	1	1	2017
Pontardawe Town	0	2	2	2026
Baglan Dragons	0	1	1	2022
Trethomas Bluebirds	1	0	1	2023
Newport City	1	0	1	2024
Port Talbot Town	1	0	1	2025
Bangor City 1876	1	0	1	2026
