= Buckley Victoria F.C. =

Former association football club in Wales

Buckley Victoria
- Full name: Buckley Victoria Football Club
- Founded: Appr. 1890
- Dissolved: 1903

Buckley Victoria was a Welsh football club based in Buckley, Wales. Formed around 1890, they played in the FA Cup, Welsh Cup and The Combination.

== History ==
Formed around 1890, they played in the FA Cup, Welsh Cup and The Combination.

== League history ==
| Season | League | Played | Won | Drew | Lost | Goals For | Goals Against | Points | Position | Teams in League |
|---|---|---|---|---|---|---|---|---|---|---|
| 1894–95 | Denbighshire and Flintshire League | | | | | | | | | |
| 1897–98 | West Cheshire League | 14 | 5 | 2 | 7 | 28 | 37 | 12 | 5 | 8 |
| 1898–99 | West Cheshire League | 18 | 9 | 0 | 9 | 44 | 37 | 18 | 7 | 11 |
| 1899–1900 | West Cheshire League | 10 | 6 | 0 | 4 | 33 | 15 | 12 | 3 | 6 |
| 1900–01 | The Combination | 22 | 6 | 4 | 12 | 32 | 68 | 16 | 11 | 12 |
| 1901–02 | Flintshire League | | | | | | | | | |
| 1902–03 | Flintshire League | | | | | | | | | |

== Cup history ==
| Season | Competition | Round | Opposition | Score | Notes |
|---|---|---|---|---|---|
| 1891–92 | Welsh Junior Cup | Semi Final | Wrexham Gymnasium | 0–10 | |
| 1896–97 | North Wales Coast Junior Cup | Semi Final | Caernarfon Reserves | 2–1 | |
| 1896–97 | North Wales Coast Junior Cup | Final | Llandudno Swifts Reserves | 5–0 | |
| 1897–98 | North Wales Coast Cup | Semi Final | Holywell | 1–3 | |
| 1898–99 | Welsh Cup | First Round | | Bye | |
| 1898–99 | Welsh Cup | Second Round | Caergwrle Wanderers | 2–1 | |
| 1898–99 | Welsh Cup | Third Round | Chirk | 1–2 | |
| 1898–99 | North Wales Coast Cup | Semi Final | Rhyl United | 3–1 | |
| 1898–99 | North Wales Coast Cup | Final | Bangor | 2–4 | |
| 1899–1900 | Welsh Cup | First Round | | Bye | |
| 1899–1900 | Welsh Cup | Second Round | Flint | 3–1 | |
| 1899–1900 | Welsh Cup | Third Round | Newport | w/o | Newport withdrew |
| 1899–1900 | Welsh Cup | Fourth Round | Carnarvon Ironopolis | 1–2 | |
| 1899–1900 | North Wales Coast Cup | Semi Final | Flint | | |
| 1899–1900 | North Wales Coast Cup | Final | Llandudno Swifts | 0–3 | |
| 1900–01 | FA Cup | First Qualifying Round | Birkenhead | 0–3 | |
| 1900–01 | Welsh Cup | Second Round | Llandudno | w/o | Buckley Victoria withdrew |
| 1900–01 | North Wales Coast Cup | Semi Final | Carnarvon | 4–3 | |
| 1900–01 | North Wales Coast Cup | Final | Bangor | 1–9 | |
