= Brymbo Victoria F.C. =

Former association football club in Wales

Brymbo Victoria (1900–1911)
- Full name: Brymbo Victoria Football Club
- Nickname: Vics
- Founded: Appr. 1900
- Dissolved: 1911
- Ground: Brymbo
- 1910–11: The Combination 4th (of 11)
Home colours

Brymbo Victoria (2017–2021)
- Full name: Brymbo Victoria Football Club
- Nickname: Vics
- Founded: 2017
- Dissolved: 2021
- Ground: Bronwen's Green, Blast Road, Brymbo
- League: North East Wales Football League Premier Division
Home colours

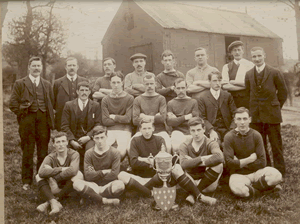

Brymbo Victoria F.C. were a Welsh football club based in Brymbo, Wales. They started the 2021–22 season as members of the North East Wales Football League Premier Division before resigning from the league in August 2021 and dissolving the club.

== History ==
For a full history see; List of football seasons involving Brymbo teams

Formed sometime around 1900 Brymbo Victoria were runners up in the Welsh Amateur Cup in 1908. They joined The Combination midway through the 1909/10 season, taking on the results of Birkenhead who had resigned mid season, finishing bottom of the league. Upon joining The Combination their colours were reported as being red and white. The 1910–11 season saw an upturn in fortunes and they finished fourth. However they folded at the end of the season.

=== Resurrection ===
The Brymbo Victoria name was resurrected more than 100 years after they last played, when in June 2017 the name was listed among the entrants for the 2017–18 North East Wales League season. This was following the decision of Brymbo Sports and Social Club to switch to Saturday football, following the demise of the Wrexham Sunday League. This club folded in 2021.

== Seasons ==
Season	League	P	W	D	L	GF	GA	Pts	Pos	Teams in League
1902-03	Flintshire League Division 1									
1903–04	Wrexham and District League Division 1	16	13	2	1	46	12	26	1	9 (+1 who withdrew)
1904–05	Wrexham and District League Division 1	16	11	1	4	46	17	23	1	9 (+3 who withdrew)
1905–06	Wrexham and District League Division 1	14	11	1	2	36	10	23	1	8 (+2 who withdrew)
1906–07	Flintshire League Division 1	14	3	7	4	19	26	10	7	10
1907–08	Wrexham and District League Division 1	18	9	3	6	40	25	21	3	10 (+2 who withdrew)
1908–09	Wrexham and District League Division 1	20	3	2	15	22	52	6	11	11
1909–10	The Combination	30	5	1	24	42	105	11	16	16
1910–11	The Combination	20	11	2	7	55	34	24	4	11
1911-2017 Club Inactive
2017–18	North East Wales League	26	8	4	14	62	73	28	10	14 (+2 who withdrew)
2018-19	North East Wales League	20	9	0	11	71	51	27	7	11
2019-20	North East Wales League	15	10	3	2	74	28	33	2	9

== Cup History ==
Season	Competition	Round	Opposition	Score	Notes
1907–08	Welsh Cup	Round 1	Buckley Engineers	2–1	Annulled, undersized pitch
1907–08	Welsh Cup	Round 1	Buckley Engineers	0–3	Replay
1907–08	Welsh Amateur Cup	Round 1	Summerhill		
1907–08	Welsh Amateur Cup	Round 2	Gwersyllt Victoria		
1907–08	Welsh Amateur Cup	Round 3	Wrexham Victoria	4–0	
1907–08	Welsh Amateur Cup	Round 4	Holyhead	3–1	
1907–08	Welsh Amateur Cup	Semi Final	Shrewsbury Rovers	3–2	Played at Oswestry
1907–08	Welsh Amateur Cup	Final	Esclusham White Stars	0–1	Played at Racecourse Ground, Wrexham
1908–09	Welsh Cup	Second Preliminary Round	Johnstown Amateurs	0–5	
1909–10	Welsh Cup	Preliminary Round	Ruabon	1–2	
1910–11	Welsh Cup	Preliminary Round	Summerhill Victoria	3–1	
1910–11	Welsh Cup	Round 1	Ruabon	1–0	
1910–11	Welsh Cup	Round 2	Johnstown	0–2	
1911-2017 Club Inactive
2017–18	Welsh Cup	First Qualifying Round	Acton	3–6	
2017–18	FAW Trophy	Round 1	Plas Madoc	3–6	
2018-19	Welsh Cup				
2018-19	FAW Trophy				

== Honours ==
=== League ===
- Wrexham and District League Division 1

Winners : 1903, 1904, 1906
Runners-up : 1905

- North East Wales League

Runners-up : 2020

=== Cups ===
- Welsh Amateur Cup

Runners-up : 1908

- St Martins Charity Cup

Winners : 1908

- Flintshire League Challenge Cup

Runners Up : 1907

== Other Info ==
Not to be confused with Brymbo Institute, Brymbo Steelworks FC or Brymbo FC.
