= Esclusham White Stars F.C. =

Former association football club in Wales

Esclusham White Stars
- Full name: Esclusham White Stars Football Club
- Nickname: Esclusham
- Founded: Appr. 1900
- Dissolved: Appr. 1930
- Ground: Rhostyllen

Esclusham White Stars was a Welsh football club based in Rhostyllen, Wales.

== History ==
Formed sometime around 1900 Esclusham White Stars won the Welsh Amateur Cup in 1905 and 1908. Esclusham also achieved some league success, they won the Wrexham District League in 1908, as well as being Runners Up in 1906, and having two Third place finishes in 1904 and 1905. Esclusham also entered the Welsh Cup, their best showing being the Second Round in 1912. They are assumed to have folded around 1930, as no record exists of the club after 1929.

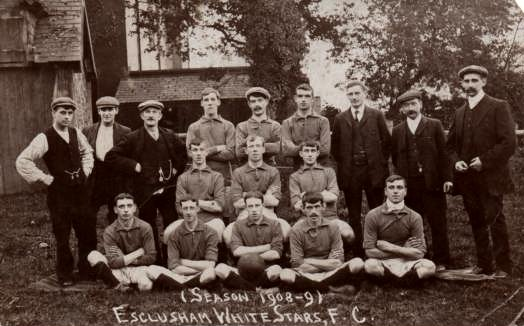

== Seasons ==
Season	League	Position
1903–04	Wrexham District League	3rd
1904–05	Wrexham District League	3rd
1905–06	Wrexham District League	2nd
1906–07	Wrexham District League	8th
1907–08	Wrexham District League	1st
1908–09	Wrexham District League	6th
1909–10	Wrexham District League	8th
1910–11	Wrexham District League	6th
1911–12	Wrexham District League	6th
1912–13	North Wales Alliance	11th
1919–20	North Wales Alliance Division 1	13th
1920–21	North Wales Alliance Division 1	13th
1926–27	Wrexham & District Amateur League	4th
1927–28	Wrexham & District Amateur League	10th
1928–29	Wrexham & District Amateur League	8th

== Cup History ==
Season	Competition	Round	Opposition	Score
1904–05	Welsh Amateur Cup	Winners	Bangor City Reserves	4–0
1907–08	Welsh Amateur Cup	Winners	Brymbo Victoria	1–0
1907–08	Denbighshire and Flintshire (Soames) Charity Cup	Runner Up	Connahs Quay	5–2
1911–12	Welsh Cup	Second Round	Rhos	3–1
1919–20	Welsh Cup	First Round	Rhos	5–1
1920–21	Welsh Cup	First Round	Gresford	1–0
1921–22	Welsh Cup	Special Preliminary Round	Oak Alyn Rovers	4–2
