= Carnarvon Ironopolis F.C. =

Former association football club in Wales

Carnarvon Ironopolis
- Full name: Carnarvon Ironopolis Football Club
- Nickname(s): the Nops
- Founded: 1891
- Dissolved: 1903
- Ground: The Oval
- 1903: North Wales Coast League Division 1 (8th of 10)
Home colours

Carnarvon Ironpolis Football Club was a football team from Caernarfon, Gwynedd.

== History ==
The club was formed in 1891 by Mr. Arthur Menzies as the factory team of De Wintens Iron Works. The team was Welsh Cup semi-finalists twice.

== Colours ==
The club wore red and black striped jerseys, with black shorts and socks.

== Ground ==
The club played at the Carnarvon Oval.

== Seasons ==
Season	League	Played	Won	Drew	Lost	Points	Position	Remarks
1895–96	North Wales Coast League Division 1	10	4	2	4	10	3	
1896–97	North Wales Coast League Division 1	9	2	2	5	6	4	
1897–98	North Wales Coast League Division 1	8	2	2	4	6	5	Table as at 02/04/1898
1898–99	North Wales Coast League Division 1	9	6	0	3	12	4	Table as at 29/04/1899
1899–1900	North Wales Coast League Division 1	14	6	2	6	12	6	2 Points Deducted
1900–01	North Wales Coast League Division 1	13	7	0	6	14	4	
1901–02	North Wales Coast League Division 1	12	9	1	2	19	1	Calculated to known results up to 24/04/02
1902–03	North Wales Coast League Division 1	14	5	2	7	14	8	All fixtures not completed

== Cup History ==
Season	Competition	Round	Opposition	Score	Remarks
1894–95	Welsh Cup	First Round		Bye	
1894–95	Welsh Cup	Second Round	Llandudno Swifts	3–2	
1895–96	Welsh Cup	First Round	Mold Red Stars	3–1	
1895–96	Welsh Cup	Second Round	Westminster Rovers	w/o	Carnarvon Ironopolis withdrew
1896–97	Welsh Cup	First Round	Rhyl Athletic	2–3	
1897–98	Welsh Cup	First Round	Portmadoc	8–0	
1897–98	Welsh Cup	Second Round	Holywell	3–3	
1897–98	Welsh Cup	Second Round Replay	Holywell	3–0	
1897–98	Welsh Cup	Third Round	Rhyl Town	3–1	Rhyl Town found in next round.
1897–98	North Wales Coast Cup	Semi Final	Bangor	1–3	Played at Llandudno
1898–99	Welsh Cup	First Round	Holywell	3–0	
1898–99	Welsh Cup	Second Round	Bangor	1–3	
1899–1900	Welsh Cup	Second Round	Portmadoc	5–0	
1899–1900	Welsh Cup	Third Round	Welshpool	4–2	
1899–1900	Welsh Cup	Fourth Round	Buckley Victoria	2–1	
1899–1900	Welsh Cup	Semi Final	Aberystwyth Town	2–2	Played at Oswestry
1899–1900	Welsh Cup	Semi Final Replay	Aberystwyth Town	0–3	Played at Towyn
1900–01	Welsh Cup	Third Round	Broughton United	1–2	
1901–02	Welsh Cup	Second Round		Bye	
1901–02	Welsh Cup	Third Round	Aberdare	w/o	Aberdare withdrew
1901–02	Welsh Cup	Fourth Round	Portmadoc	5–1	
1901–02	Welsh Cup	Semi Final	Wrexham	1–2	Played at Rhyl
1902–03	Welsh Cup	Third Round	Rhyl United	2–3	

== Honours ==
- North Wales Coast League Division 1
  - Champion: 1901–02
