= Westminster Rovers F.C. =

Former association football club in Wales

Westminster Rovers
- Full name: Westminster Rovers Football Club
- Founded: Appr. 1889
- Dissolved: 1897
- Ground: Stansty Park
Home colours

Westminster Rovers F.C. was a Welsh football club based in Wrexham, Wales.

== History ==
Formed sometime around 1889 as the team of the Westminster Colliery, Westminster Rovers were runners up in the Welsh Cup in 1892 and 1894, on both occasions losing to Chirk. They were also founding members of the Welsh Senior League, a competition which they won in 1894. They are last mentioned in 1897. The name reappeared in 1919, for one season in the Ffrith and District League.

== Colours ==
The club wore white jerseys.

== Ground ==
The club played at Stansty Park.

== Seasons ==
Season	League	P	W	D	L	GF	GA	Pts	Pos	Teams in League
1890–91	Welsh Senior League	9	2	3	4	18	18	1*	6	6
1892–93	Welsh Senior League	14	5	1	8	30	31	11	6	8
1893–94	Welsh Senior League	16	11	2	3	54	26	25	1	9
1894–95	Welsh Senior League	15	8	4	3	45	27	20	2	9
1895–96	Welsh Senior League	12	2	2	8	23	48	6	6	7
1896–97	Welsh Senior League	14	2	3	9	22	65	7	7	8
1919–20	Ffrith and District League	20	16	1	3	89	21	33	3	12

== Cup history ==
Season	Competition	Round	Opposition	Score	Notes
1889–90	Welsh Cup	Round 1	Over Wanderers	3–4	Over Wanderers withdrew after protests.
1889–90	Welsh Cup	Round 2	Wrexham	1–1	
1889–90	Welsh Cup	Round 2	Wrexham	1–1	Replay
1889–90	Welsh Cup	Round 2	Wrexham	0–1	Second Replay
1890–91	Welsh Cup	Round 1	Nantwich	w/o	
1890–91	Welsh Cup	Round 2	Gresford	4–3	
1890–91	Welsh Cup	Quarter Final	Wrexham	0–1	
1891–92	Welsh Cup	Round 1	Brymbo Institute	4–3	Replayed after protest.
1891–92	Welsh Cup	Round 1	Brymbo Institute	4–1	Replay
1891–92	Welsh Cup	Round 2	Gresford	6–1	
1891–92	Welsh Cup	Quarter Final	Crewe Alexandra Hornets		Crewe withdrew after being ordered to replay.
1891–92	Welsh Cup	Semi Final	Shrewsbury Town	0–4	Played at Chirk. Replayed after protest.
1891–92	Welsh Cup	Semi Final	Shrewsbury Town	3–1	Replay. Played at Chirk.
1891–92	Welsh Cup	Final	Chirk	1–2	Attendance 4,000. Played at Racecourse Ground, Wrexham.
1892–93	Welsh Cup	Quarter Final	Druids	0–1	
1893–94	Welsh Cup	Round 1	Rhostyllen Victoria	3–0	
1893–94	Welsh Cup	Round 2	Brymbo Institute	3–2	
1893–94	Welsh Cup	Round 3			Bye
1893–94	Welsh Cup	Quarter Final	Druids	4–3	
1893–94	Welsh Cup	Semi Final	Wrexham	5–3	Played at Racecourse Ground, Wrexham.
1893–94	Welsh Cup	Final	Chirk	0–2	Played at Wynnstay Park, Ruabon.
1894–95	Welsh Cup	Quarter Final	Newtown	0–1	
1895–96	Welsh Cup	Round 1	Flint	1–0	
1895–96	Welsh Cup	Round 2	Carnarvon Ironopolis	w/o	
1895–96	Welsh Cup	Round 3	Bangor	1–1	
1895–96	Welsh Cup	Round 3	Bangor	1–3	Replay
1896–97	Welsh Cup	Round 1	Rhostyllen Victoria	0–2	
1896–97	Denbighshire and Flintshire Charity Cup	Final	Chirk	0–1	

== Notable players ==
- Harry Trainer, centre-forward, who in 1894, while with the club, was cautioned for assault of a pub landlord, the victim accepting £5 on behalf of a hospital charity in compensation. – Wales Football International.
- Job Wilding – Wales Football International.

== Honours ==
=== League ===
- Welsh Senior League

Winners (1): 1894
Runner Up (1): 1895

=== Cups ===
- Welsh Cup

Runner Up (2): 1892, 1894

- Denbighshire and Flintshire Charity Cup

Runner Up (1): 1897
