= Llandudno Swifts F.C. =

Former association football club in Wales

Llandudno Swifts
- Full name: Llandudno Swifts Football Club
- Nickname: Swifts
- Founded: 1889
- Dissolved: 1901
- Ground: Council Ground, Llandudno

Llandudno Swifts were a Welsh football club from Llandudno that existed during the late Victorian era. The club was first mentioned in 1889. They competed in the Combination, North Wales Coast League, Welsh Cup, FA Cup and North Wales Coast Cup. The club was wound up in 1901 after a period of professionalism. Following the demise of Llandudno Swifts, a new team Llandudno Amateurs were formed. A new Llandudno Swifts team was founded in 2024, joining the North Wales Coast East Football League.

== Colours ==
Pre November 1900	November 1900 onwards

== Seasons ==
Season	League	Played	Won	Drew	Lost	Points	Position	Remarks
1893–94	North Wales Coast League Division 1	12	9	2	1	20	2	
1894–95	North Wales Coast League Division 1	8	5	1	2	11	3	
1895–96	North Wales Coast League Division 1	10	3	1	6	7	4	
1896–97	North Wales Coast League Division 1	10	8	1	1	17	1	
1897–98	North Wales Coast League Division 1	9	7	1	2	13	1	
1898–99	The Combination	28	12	3	13	27	9	
1898–99	North Wales Coast League Division 1	10	3	1	6	7	7	First team found in Combination. Presumably the Reserves. Table as at 29/04/1899
1899–1900	North Wales Coast League Division 1	14	5	2	7	12	5	
1900–01	North Wales Coast League Division 1	13	5	3	5	13	6	

== Cup history ==
Season	Competition	Round	Opposition	Score	Remarks
1891–92	Welsh Junior Cup	Final	Wrexham Gymnasium	3–1	Played at Summer Gardens, Rhyl.
1892–93	Welsh Cup	First Round	Flint	2–0	
1892–93	Welsh Cup	Second Round	Bangor	2–0	
1892–93	Welsh Cup	Third Round	Holywell	w/o	Holywell failed to appear
1892–93	Welsh Cup	Fourth Round	Shrewsbury Town	4–0	
1892–93	Welsh Cup	Semi Final	Wrexham	1–2	Played at Flint
1893–94	Welsh Cup	Bye to Fourth Round			
1893–94	Welsh Cup	Fourth Round	Chirk	2–3	
1894–95	Welsh Cup	First Round	Flint	1–0	
1894–95	Welsh Cup	Second Round	Carnarvon Ironopolis	3–2	
1894–95	Welsh Cup	Third Round	Bangor	1–1	
1894–95	Welsh Cup	Third Round Replay	Bangor	0–1	
1894–95	North Wales Coast Cup	Final	Bangor	1–2	Played at The Oval, Caernarfon.
1895–96	Welsh Cup	First Round	Bangor	2–3	A.E.T. 2–2 FT
1895–96	North Wales Coast Cup	Final	Bangor	0–2	Played at Bangor. Crowd 3,000.
1896–97	FA Cup	First Qualifying Round	Liverpool South End	0–2	
1896–97	Welsh Cup	First Round	Holywell	1–2	
1896–97	North Wales Coast Cup	Final	Bangor	5–1	Played at St Asaph
1896–97	North Wales Coast Junior Cup	Final	Buckley Victoria	0–5	Reserves. Played at Holywell
1897–98	FA Cup	First Qualifying Round	Rock Ferry	0–3	
1897–98	Welsh Cup	First Round	Bangor	0–1	
1898–99	Welsh Cup	First Round	Rhyl United	2–3	
1899–1900	FA Cup	Second Qualifying Round	Wrexham	1–2	
1899–1900	Welsh Cup	Bye to Third Round			
1899–1900	Welsh Cup	Third Round	Newtown	1–6	
1900–01	FA Cup	First Qualifying Round	Rhyl United	0–3	
1900–01	Welsh Cup	Second Round	Buckley Victoria	w/o	Buckley Victoria withdrew
1900–01	Welsh Cup	Third Round	Chirk	w/o	Llandudno withdrew

== Honours ==
=== League ===
- North Wales Coast League Division 1

Winners : 1897, 1898
Runners-up : 1894

=== Cup ===
- Welsh Amateur Cup

Winners : 1892

- North Wales Coast Cup

Winners : 1897
Runners-up : 1895, 1896

- North Wales Coast Junior Cup

Runners-up : 1897
