= 2022–23 Welsh Cup =

JD Welsh Cup
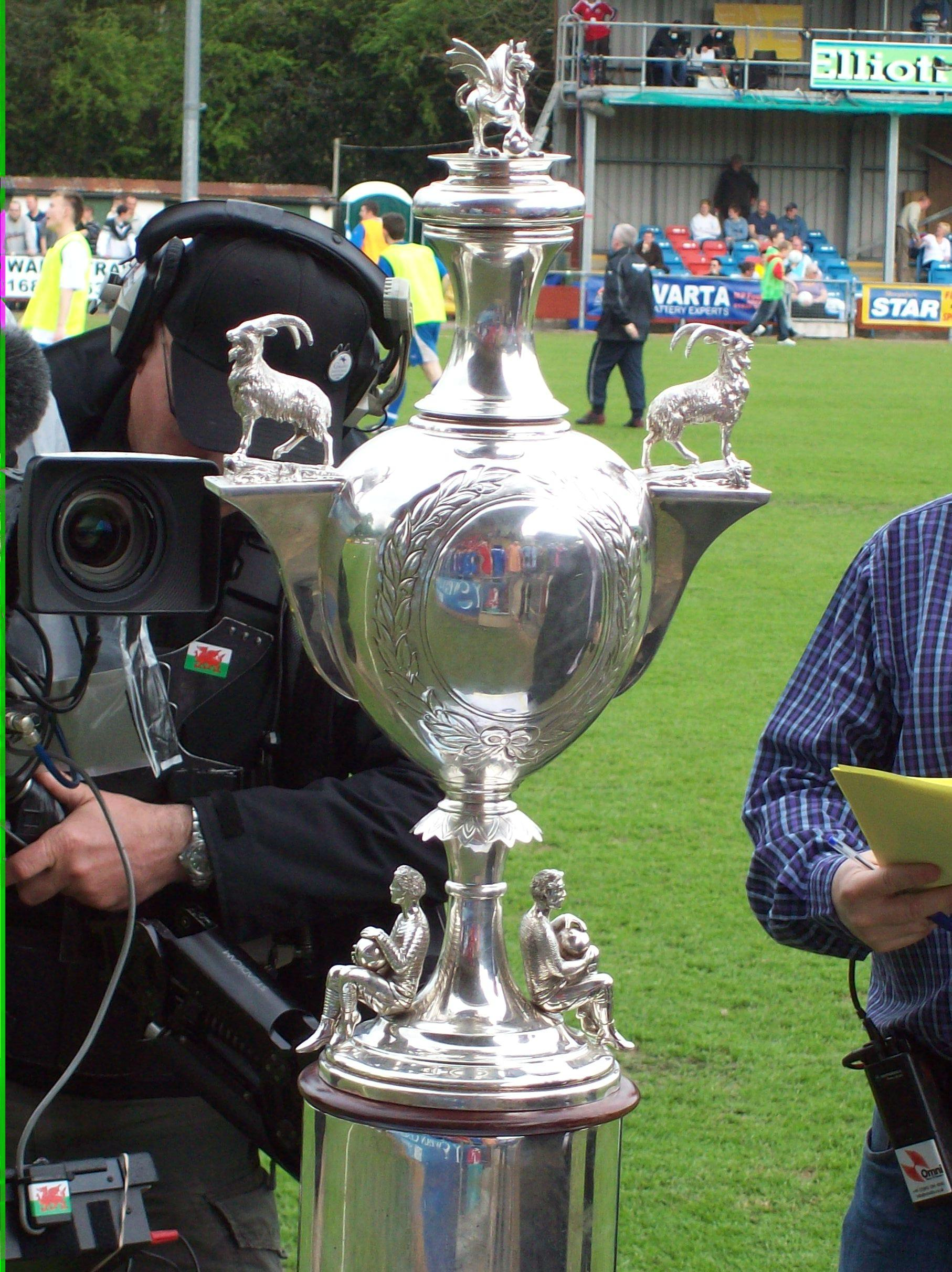
- The Welsh Cup

Tournament details
- Country: Wales
- Dates: 30 July 2022 – 30 April 2023

Final positions
- Champions: The New Saints
- Runners-up: Bala Town

The 2022–23 FAW Welsh Cup was the 135th season of the annual knockout tournament for competitive football teams in Wales. The winners qualified for the 2023–24 Europa Conference League first qualifying round.

The New Saints won the cup by defeating Bala Town in the final, their third consecutive Welsh Cup win and ninth overall. Since they qualified for the Europa Conference League based on league position, the Europa Conference League spot for winning the cup was passed to the third-placed team in the 2022–23 Cymru Premier.

== Schedule ==
| Round | Draw date | Main date | Number of fixtures | Clubs remaining | New entries this round | Divisions entering this round |
|---|---|---|---|---|---|---|
| First qualifying round | 6 July 2022 | Saturday 30 July 2022 | 97 | 194 → 97 | 194 | 49 Tier 3 teams and teams from all lower tiers. |
| Second qualifying round | 1 August 2022 | Saturday 20 August 2022 | 56 | 112 → 56 | 15 | 15 Tier 3 teams |
| First round | 22August 2022 | Saturday 17 September 2022 | 36 | 72 → 36 | 16 | 8 Cymru North teams 8 Cymru South teams |
| Second round | TBA | Saturday 8 October 2022 | 32 | 64 → 32 | 28 | 12 Cymru Premier teams 8 Cymru North teams 8 Cymru South teams |
| Third round | TBA | Saturday 12 November 2022 | 16 | 32 → 16 | None | None |
| Fourth round | TBA | Saturday 14 January 2023 | 8 | 16 → 8 | None | None |
| Fifth round | TBA | Saturday 4 February 2023 | 4 | 8 → 4 | None | None |
| Semi-Finals | TBA | Saturday 4 March 2023 | 2 | 4 → 2 | None | None |
| 2023 Welsh Cup Final | N/A | Sunday 30 April 2023 | 1 | 2 → 1 | None | None |

== Format changes ==
The National Cup Board changed the rules for the new season: five substitutes could be used, within three substitute periods for all rounds; and seedings for Round 2, introduced in the previous season, were retained with the 28 seeded clubs from the JD Cymru Premier (12), JD Cymru North (8) and JD Cymru South (8) drawn away from home.

== First qualifying round ==
The competition achieved 253 entries, surpassing the record from the previous season by ten. The first qualifying round matches were announced on 6 July at the FAW HQ in Hensol and played on the weekend of 29, 30 & 31 July 2022. There were 194 clubs in the draw with fifteen Tier 3 clubs receiving byes into Qualifying Round 2, based on their League positions at the end of last season.

The teams receiving a bye into the second qualifying round are:

- Ardal NE: Caersws, Cefn Albion, Llanfair United, Llangollen Town, Llanrhaeadr
- Ardal NW: Denbigh Town, Llangefni Town, Llanrwst United
- Ardal SE: Abertillery Bluebirds, Caldicot Town, Risca United, Undy Athletic
- Ardal SW: Cardiff Draconians, Pontyclun, Port Talbot Town

=== North ===
| Tie | Home team (tier) | Score | Away team (tier) | Kick-off | Referee | Att. |
Saturday 23 July 2022
| 37 | Llanystumdwy(5) | 1–4 | Y Felinheli(3) | 14:00 BST | Iolo Williams | |
Friday 29 July 2022
| 2 | Bangor 1876(3) | 9–2 | Llanberis(4) | 19:30 BST | Rhodri Ab Dafydd | 270 |
| 16 | Kinmel Bay(4) | 4–2 | Rhuddlan Town(4) | 19:00 BST | Michael Gray | (Played at Rhuddlan Town) |
| 23 | Llay Welfare(3) | 5–0 | Lex Glyndwr XI(4) | 18:45 BST | Stephen Wilday | |
| 39 | C.P.D. Y Rhyl 1879(3) | 1–0 | Abergele(5) | 19:00 BST | Tony Moore | |
Saturday 30 July 2022
| 1 | Amlwch Town(4) | 1–2 | Aberffraw(4) | 14:00 BST | Robin Williams | |
| 3 | Barmouth & Dyffryn United(4) | 3–1 | Blaenau Ffestiniog Amateurs(4) | 14:00 BST | Rhodri Ab Dafydd | |
| 4 | Bodedern Athletic(3) | 17–0 | Gaerwen(4) | 14:00 BST | Matthew Jones | |
| 5 | Bontnewydd(5) | 4–0 | Mountain Rangers(5) | 14:00 BST | Terry Williams | |
| 6 | Bow(5) | 2–2 (2–0 p) | Betws-y-Coed (5) | 14:00 BST | Craig Griffiths | Bow FC were removed from the competition and Betws-Y-Coed reinstated after a breach of the eligibility rules. |
| 7 | Brickfield Rangers(3) | 4–0 | Mynydd Isa Spartans(4) | 14:00 BST | Aled Williams | |
| 8 | Caerwys(5) | 0–4 | Hawarden Rangers(3) | 14:00 BST | Michael Woodward | |
| 9 | Castell Alun Colts(4) | 1–2 | Corwen(3) | 14:00 BST | Jamie Monk | |
| 10 | Cefni(5) | 3–2 | Menai Bridge Tigers(4) | 14:00 BST | William Parry | |
| 11 | Cerrigydrudion (4) | 1–4 | Llansannan(4) | 14:00 BST | Glenn Gray | |
| 12 | Coedpoeth United(4) | 0–2 | Ruabon Rovers(5) | 14:00 BST | Keith Ottley | |
| 13 | Connah's Quay Town(4) | 1–2 | Halkyn & Flint Mountain(3) | 14:00 BST | Stephen Jones | 95 |
| 14 | Glantraeth(4) | 1–0 | Bethesda Athletic(4) | 14:00 BST | Aled Williams | |
| 15 | Gronant(5) | 3–3 (1–3 p) | Greenfield(4) | 14:00 BST | Craig Williams | |
| 17 | Llandudno Albion(3) | 2–0 | St Asaph City (4) | 14:00 BST | William Peel | |
| 18 | Llandudno Junction (4) | 2–0 | Meliden(4) | 14:00 BST | Michael Gray | |
| 19 | Llandyrnog United (4) | 0–2 | Llandudno Amateurs (5) | 14:00 BST | Tony Samuel | |
| 20 | Llanfairfechan Town(4) | 4–2 | Llanfairpwll(5) | 14:00 BST | Martin Trigg | |
| 21 | Llannefydd(4) | 11–0 | Llysfaen (5) | 14:00 BST | Tony Moore | |
| 22 | Llanuwchllyn(3) | 5–1 | NFA (5) | 14:00 BST | Shaun Edwards | 73 |
| 24 | Mochdre Sports (4) | 2–2 (3–1 p) | Bro Cernyw(4) | 14:00 BST | Anthony Howard | 40 |
| 25 | Mynydd Llandegai(4) | 3–5 | Gwalchmai(4) | 14:00 BST | Arwel Jones | |
| 26 | Nefyn United(4) | 4–1 | Pwllheli(4) | 14:00 BST | Peter Owen | |
| 27 | Penmaenmawr Phoenix(4) | 2–4 | Llanrug United(4) | 14:00 BST | Scott Longley | |
| 28 | Penrhyndeudraeth(4) | 1–1 (4–2 p) | Caergybi(5) | 14:00 BST | | |
| 29 | Pentraeth(4) | 1–4 | Talysarn Celts(4) | 14:00 BST | Gwilym Evans | |
| 30 | Penycae(3) | 3–2 | Saltney Town(3) | 14:00 BST | Mark Stokes | |
| 31 | Prestatyn Sports(4) | 6–1 | Rhyl All Stars (5) | 14:00 BST | Conor Charlton-Fleming | |
| 32 | Rhostyllen(3) | 3–3 (3–4 p) | New Brighton Villa(4) | 14:00 BST | Gareth Hughes | |
| 33 | Rhydymwyn (3) | 0–6 | Rhos Aelwyd(3) | 14:00 BST | Carl Tombs | |
| 34 | Rhyl Dragons (5) | 2–3 | Caer Clwyd (5) | 14:00 BST | Wayne Geraghty | |
| 35 | Sychdyn | 0–7 | FC Queens Park(4) | 14:00 BST | Jordan Spender | |
| 36 | Y Fali(5) | 1–5 | Llannerch-Y-Medd(4) | 14:00 BST | Ian Tuck | |
| 38 | Y Glannau (5) | 6–0 | FC United of Wrexham(5) | 14:00 BST | John Morris | |
| 40 | Trearddur Bay(5) | 3–1 | Nantlle Vale(3) | 14:00 BST | Terry Atkinson | |

=== Central ===
| Tie | Home team (tier) | Score | Away team (tier) | Kick-off | Referee | Att. |
Friday 29 July 2022
| 49 | Penparcau (4) | 2–1 | Rhayader Town(3) | 19:30 BST | Aled Jones | 235 |
Saturday 30 July 2022
| 41 | Berriew | 1–2 | Knighton Town (4) | 14:00 BST | Stephen Fisher | |
| 42 | Bow Street(3) | 6–0 | Llansantffraid Village(4) | 14:00 BST | Gwilym Lewis | 64 |
| 43 | Brecon (4) | w/o | Machynlleth (4) | 14:00 BST | | (Brecon unable to fulfil fixture) |
| 44 | Carno(4) | 5–0 | Aberaeron(4) | 14:00 BST | David Hughes | |
| 45 | Dolgellau Athletic(3) | 2–1 | Builth Wells(3) | 14:00 BST | Iolo Williams | |
| 46 | Llandrindod Wells(3) | 3–1 | Four Crosses (4) | 14:00 BST | Edward Pryce | |
| 47 | Llanilar (4) | 1–2 | Waterloo Rovers(4) | 14:00 BST | David Morgan | 80 |
| 48 | Montgomery Town(4) | 5–4 | Tywyn Bryncrug(4) | 14:00 BST | Neil Bayliss | |
| 50 | Presteigne St Andrews(4) | w/o | Trefonen | 14:00 BST | | (Trefonen withdrew from competition) |
| 51 | Welshpool Town(3) | 1–2 | Abermule(4) | 14:00 BST | Ryan Davies | (Played at Abermule) |

=== South ===
| Tie | Home team (tier) | Score | Away team (tier) | Kick-off | Referee | Att. |
Friday 29 July 2022
| 61 | Canton Liberal(4) | 3–2 | Clwb Cymric(5) | 19:00 BST | Matthew John | |
| 77 | Morriston Town(4) | 0–0 (2–4 p) | Penlan Club(4) | 19:00 BST | Craig Templeton | |
| 79 | Pencoed Athletic(4) | 3–2 | Afan United | 19:30 BST | Paul Fisher | 145 |
| 86 | Rockspur | 3–2 | St Josephs(6) | 18:30 BST | David Powell | |
| 93 | Treforest(5) | 1–1 (1–3 p) | AFC Penrhiwceiber (5) | 18:30 BST | Mark Boucher | (Played at AFC Penrhiwceiber) |
| 94 | Treharris Athletic(3) | 11–0 | Merthyr Saints(4) | 19:00 BST | Kevin Russell | 137 |
Saturday 30 July 2022
| 52 | Aberbargoed Buds(4) | 3–2 | Rogerstone(4) | 14:00 BST | Joshua Howells | |
| 53 | Aber Valley(4) | w/o | Cardiff Cosmopolitan(6) | 14:00 BST | | (Match Postponed) |
| 54 | Aberystwyth Exiles(7) | 0–18 | Cardiff Airport | 14:00 BST | Duncan Lewis | 50 |
| 55 | AFC Llwydcoed(3) | 6–0 | Penarth Town | 14:00 BST | Vasilica Ciuplea | 112 |
| 56 | AFC Pontymister(4) | 2–4 | Croesyceiliog(3) | 14:00 BST | Terry Leonard | |
| 57 | AFC Whitchurch | 0–2 | Canton Rangers (5) | 14:00 BST | Geoffrey Martin | (Played at Canton Rangers) |
| 58 | Brecon Corinthians(3) | 2–1 | Caerleon(4) | 14:00 BST | Alan Jenkins | |
| 59 | Bryn Rovers | 1–4 | Calsonic Kansei Swiss Valley | 14:00 BST | Philip Harris | |
| 60 | Caerphilly Athletic(5) | 2–1 | Ely Rangers (4) | 14:00 BST | Andrew Wallen | |
| 62 | Cardiff Corinthians(4) | 4–0 | Cwmbach Royal Stars(6) | 14:00 BST | Graham Evans | (Played at Cwmbach Royal Stars) |
| 63 | Cefn Cribwr(3) | 3–1 | Mumbles Rangers(3) | 14:00 BST | Michael Pedler | |
| 64 | Cefn Fforest(5) | 0–0 (0–3 p) | Newport City(3) | 14:00 BST | Robert Thomas | |
| 65 | Chepstow Town(3) | 3–1 | Blaenavon Blues(3) | 14:00 BST | Richard Beach | |
| 66 | Clase Social | 0–3 | Ton Pentre (4) | 14:00 BST | Jeffrey Moore | (Played at Ton Pentre) |
| 67 | Cwmbrân Town(4) | 2–3 | Nelson Cavaliers(6) | 14:00 BST | Robert Rosen | 55 |
| 68 | Docks Albion(7) | 4–10 | Aberfan Social (5) | 14:00 BST | Sean Hicks | |
| 69 | Evans & Williams(4) | 2–2 (10–9 p) | South Gower(4) | 14:00 BST | Neill Crawshaw | |
| 70 | FC Tredegar( ) | 0–6 | RTB Ebbw Vale(3) | 14:00 BST | Scott Brown | 100 (Played at RTB Ebbw Vale) |
| 71 | Garden Village(3) | 5–2 | Dafen Welfare(4) | 14:00 BST | Paul Jones | |
| 72 | Garw SBGC(4) | 3–1 | Cwm Wanderers(4) | 14:00 BST | Lewys Thomas | |
| 73 | Goytre(3) | 8–0 | Ynysddu Welfare(4) | 14:00 BST | Darren Adie | |
| 74 | Hakin United | 3–0 | Cwmamman United(3) | 14:00 BST | Robert Blowes | |
| 75 | Llanrumney Athletic | 0–9 | FC Cwmaman(4) | 14:00 BST | John Cottrell | |
| 76 | Lliswerry(3) | 5–0 | Newport Saints(5) | 14:00 BST | Stephen Richards | |
| 78 | New Inn(4) | 1–3 | Newport Civil Service(4) | 14:00 BST | Nigel Baldwin | |
| 80 | Penrhiwceiber Rangers(3) | 1–0 | Caerau (Ely) (3) | 14:00 BST | Jordan Harman | |
| 81 | Pentwynmawr Athletic(5) | 1–1 (2–4 p) | Treowen Stars(3) | 14:00 BST | Jefferson Townsend | 110 |
| 82 | Penydarren BGC(3) | 6–0 | Clwb Sparta | 14:00 BST | Alun Thomas | |
| 83 | PILCS(5) | 0–2 | Newport Corinthians(4) | 14:00 BST | Christopher Parker | |
| 84 | Pill(4) | 1–0 | Cefn Hengoed | 14:00 BST | Phillip Bates | |
| 85 | Porthcawl Town Athletic(4) | 2–0 | Trostre(5) | 14:00 BST | Ryan Tudor | |
| 87 | Seven Sisters Onllwyn(3) | 1–4 | Baglan Dragons(3) | 14:00 BST | David Alder | |
| 88 | Sully Sports(5) | 1–3 | Dinas Powys(3) | 14:00 BST | Luke Mansell | 50 (Played at Dinas Powys) |
| 89 | Thornhill AFC(7) | w/o | Aberdare Town (5) | 14:00 BST | | (Thornhill withdrew from competition) |
| 90 | Tiger Bay(7) | 6–1 | Bridgend Street(4) | 14:00 BST | Sam Lloyd | |
| 91 | Tonyrefail BGC (4) | 0–0 (8–7 p) | Vale United(5) | 14:00 BST | Allen Griffiths | (Played at Vale United) |
| 92 | Tredegar Town(3) | 0–2 | Monmouth Town(3) | 14:00 BST | Paul Lewis | 56 |
| 95 | West End(4) | 3–1 | Bettws(6) | 14:00 BST | Christopher Neal | |
| 96 | Wattsville(4) | 2–2 (5–3 p) | Marshfield | 14:00 BST | Huw Marfell | |
| 97 | Ynysygerwn(3) | 7–0 | AFC Porth(4) | 14:00 BST | Christopher Byng | |

== Second qualifying round ==
The Qualifying Round 2 draw was made at the Football Association of Wales Headquarters in Hensol on 1 August with ties to be played over the weekend of Saturday 20 August.

=== North ===
| Tie | Home team (tier) | Score | Away team (tier) | Kick-off | Referee | Att. |
Saturday 20 August 2022
| 1 | Y Glannau(5) | 5–2 | Caer Clwyd(5) | 14:00 BST | Craig Griffiths | |
| 2 | New Brighton Villa(4) | 0–3 | C.P.D. Y Rhyl 1879(3) | 14:00 BST | John Spender | |
| 3 | Brickfield Rangers(3) | 1–3 | Llansannan(4) | 14:00 BST | Keith Ottley | |
| 4 | Cefn Albion(3) | 0–2 | Denbigh Town(3) | 14:00 BST | Gareth Edwards | 137 (Played at Denbigh Town) |
| 5 | Prestatyn Sports(4) | 1–4 | Hawarden Rangers(3) | 14:00 BST | Tony Samuel | |
| 6 | Penycae(3) | 3–2 | Ruabon Rovers(5) | 14:00 BST | Jamie Monk | |
| 7 | Rhos Aelwyd(3) | 0–2 | FC Queens Park(4) | 14:00 BST | Shaun Edwards | 200 |
| 8 | Flint Mountain(3) | 2–2 (3–1 p) | Llannefydd(4) | 14:00 BST | Stephen Jones | (Played at Llannefydd) |
| 9 | Corwen(3) | 2–9 | Llay Welfare(3) | 14:00 BST | Gareth Webb | |
| 10 | Kinmel Bay(4) | 0–0 (5–3 p) | Greenfield(4) | 14:00 BST | Martin Trigg | |
| 11 | Llanrwst United(3) | w/o | Betws-y-Coed(5) | 17:30 BST | | *Having been reinstated, Betws-y-Coed withdrew. |
| 12 | Llanrug United(4) | 2–2 (5–4 p) | Penrhyndeudraeth(4) | 14:00 BST | Tomos Jones | |
| 13 | Cefni(5) | 0–3 | Mochdre Sports(4) | 14:00 BST | | 100 |
| 14 | Gwalchmai(4) | 2–4 | Llandudno Albion(3) | 14:00 BST | Anthony Howard | |
| 16 | Llandudno Amateurs(5) | 2–0 | Bodedern Athletic(3) | 15:30 BST | Mark Blench | 80 |
| 17 | Glantraeth(4) | 1–1 (4–3 p) | Barmouth & Dyffryn United(4) | 14:00 BST | Mark James | |
| 18 | Y Felinheli(3) | 4–0 | Aberffraw(4) | 14:00 BST | Carl Hagan | 80 |
| 19 | Bontnewydd(5) | 0–4 | Llanuwchllyn(3) | 14:00 BST | Terry Williams | |
| 20 | Llannerch-Y-Medd(4) | 1–8 | Bangor 1876(3) | 14:00 BST | Aled Williams | |
| 21 | Llandudno Junction(4) | 0–2 | Talysarn Celts(4) | 14:00 BST | Tony Moore | |
| 22 | Trearddur Bay(4) | 6–4 | Llanfairfechan Town(4) | 14:00 BST | David Griffiths | |
Saturday 27 August 2022
| 15 | Nefyn United(4) | 2–4 | Llangefni Town(3) | 14:00 BST | Rhodri Ab Dafydd | |

=== Central ===
| Tie | Home team (tier) | Score | Away team (tier) | Kick-off | Referee | Att. |
Saturday 20 August 2022
| 23 | Llandrindod Wells(3) | 3–1 | Knighton Town(4) | 14:00 BST | Michael Pugh | |
| 24 | Carno(4) | w/o | Caersws(3) | 14:00 BST | | (Carno unable to fulfil fixture) |
| 25 | Penparcau(4) | 2–0 | Montgomery Town(4) | 13:00 BST | Gwilym Lewis | (Played at Montgomery Town) |
| 26 | Abermule(4) | 4–2 | Presteigne St Andrews(4) | 14:00 BST | Steven Bradford | 44 |
| 27 | Dolgellau Athletic(3) | 1–2 | Bow Street(3) | 14:00 BST | Ryan Davies | 83 |
| 28 | Llanrhaeadr(3) | 0–5 | Llanfair United(3) | 14:00 BST | Aled Jones | 125 |
| 29 | Machynlleth(4) | 2–2 (5–4 p) | Waterloo Rovers(4) | 14:00 BST | Richard Edwards | |

=== South ===
| Tie | Home team (tier) | Score | Away team (tier) | Kick-off | Referee | Att. |
Friday 19 August 2022
| 30 | Newport City(3) | 5–4 | Undy Athletic(3) | 19:30 BST | Scott Brown | |
| 36 | Nelson Cavaliers(6) | 3–5 | Goytre(3) | 19:30 BST | Ian Hollyoake | |
| 41 | Croesyceiliog(3) | 3–1 | Newport Civil Service(4) | 18:45 BST | Michael Pickett | |
| 54 | Cardiff Corinthians(4) | 3–0 | AFC Llwydcoed(3) | 19:15 BST | Neil Wilcox | |
Saturday 20 August 2022
| 31 | Risca United(3) | 3–2 | Caerphilly Athletic(5) | 14:00 BST | Nigel Baldwin | 64 |
| 32 | Wattsville(4) | 0–2 | Trethomas Bluebirds(3) | 14:00 BST | Joseph Gibson | 59 |
| 33 | Aber Valley(4) | 2–0 | Newport Corinthians(4) | 14:00 BST | Graham Evans | |
| 34 | Canton Liberal(4) | 1–1 (4–2 p) | Abertillery Bluebirds(3) | 14:00 BST | Alan Gitsham | |
| 35 | Monmouth Town(3) | 0–2 | Chepstow Town(3) | 14:00 BST | Darran Adie | (Played at Chepstow Town) |
| 37 | Caldicot Town(3) | 1–0 | Tiger Bay(7) | 14:00 BST | Terry Leonard | |
| 38 | Cardiff Draconians(3) | 4–4 (8–9 p) | Brecon Corinthians(3) | 14:00 BST | Dale Randall | |
| 39 | Lliswerry(3) | 0–1 | Aberbargoed Buds(4) | 14:00 BST | Phillip Bates | |
| 0 | Treowen Stars(3) | 2–2 (5–4 p) | Dinas Powys(3) | 14:00 BST | Huw Marfell | |
| 42 | RTB Ebbw Vale(3) | 3–5 | Pill(4) | 14:00 BST | Benjamin Skuse | |
| 43 | Aberfan Social(5) | 8–3 | AFC Penrhiwceiber(5) | 14:00 BST | Kevin Morgan | |
| 44 | Cefn Cribwr(3) | 2–0 | Port Talbot Town(3) | 14:00 BST | John Cottrell | |
| 45 | Hakin United(5) | 5–0 | Penlan Club(4) | 14:00 BST | Jeffrey Moore | 888 |
| 46 | Calsonic Kansei Swiss Valley(4) | 2–2 (3–1 p) | Penrhiwceiber Rangers(3) | 14:00 BST | Neill Crawshaw | 100 |
| 47 | Pontyclun(3) | 2–3 | Penydarren BGC(3) | 14:00 BST | Sam Lloyd | |
| 48 | Ton Pentre(4) | 1–0 | Cardiff Airport(4) | 14:00 BST | Andrew Wallen | |
| 49 | Garden Village(3) | 2–2 (2–3 p) | Pencoed Athletic(4) | 14:00 BST | Christopher Ball | |
| 50 | West End(4) | 3–2 | FC Cwmaman(4) | 15:00 BST | Craig Templeton | |
| 51 | Evans & Williams(4) | 0–3 | Baglan Dragons(3) | 14:00 BST | Richard Morgan | |
| 52 | Garw SBGC(4) | 2–3 | Treharris Athletic(3) | 14:00 BST | Joshua Taylor | 46 |
| 53 | Tonyrefail BGC(4) | 1–3 | Rockspur(5) | 14:00 BST | Daryl Jenkins | |
| 55 | Porthcawl Town Athletic(4) | 2–1 | Canton Rangers(5) | 14:00 BST | Gary Webber | |
| 56 | Aberdare Town(5) | 1–3 | Ynysygerwn(3) | 14:00 BST | Tegid Richards | |

== First round ==
The First Round draw was made at the Football Association of Wales Headquarters in Hensol on 22 August. Matches for this round were played on Saturday 17 September 2022. Tier 2 teams entered the competition with 16 teams competing and the remaining 16 receiving a bye into the second round.

The teams that received a bye into the Second Round were:

- Cymru North: Buckley Town, Cefn Druids, Colwyn Bay, Guilsfield, Holyhead Hotspur, Holywell Town, Llandudno, Ruthin Town
- Cymru South: Barry Town United, Briton Ferry Llansawel, Cambrian & Clydach Vale, Carmarthen Town, Goytre United, Llantwit Major, Swansea University, Taff's Well

=== North ===
| 17 September 2022 | Llanidloes Town(2) | 0–1 | Gresford Athletic(2) | Llanidloes |
| 14:30 BST | | | Christopher Hibbert 32' | Stadium: Victoria Park; Attendance: 199; Referee: Karl Berry |

| 17 September 2022 | Penparcau(4) | 1–3 | Rhyl 1879(3) | Penparcau |
| 14:30 BST | Matthew Davies 39' | | Alex Jones 32' (pen.); Andrew Gittins 56' (o.g.); Kieran Ellis 60' | Stadium: Min-y-Ddol; Referee: Aled Williams |

| 23 September 2022 | Denbigh Town(3) | 6–1 | Llanrwst United(3) | Denbigh |
| 19:30 BST | Walker 43' 43' 90+1' (pen.); Ben Lockley 45'; Nathan Brown 58' 70' | | Unknown 75' | Stadium: Central Park; Referee: Rhodri Ab Dafydd |

| 17 September 2022 | Penrhyncoch(2) | 1–1 (3–4 p) | Caersws(3) | Penrhyn-coch |
| 14:30 BST | Liam Lewis 62' | | Neil Mitchell 43' | Stadium: Cae Baker; Attendance: 128; Referee: Siôn Davies |
| | Penalties |
| | Cledan Davies (penalty missed); Tomos Evans (penalty missed); Liam Lewis (penalty scored); Daniel Owen (penalty scored); Steffan Gittins (penalty scored); Joshua Shaw (penalty missed) | | (penalty scored) Neil Mitchell; (penalty scored) Luke Evans; (penalty missed) Calum Bennett; (penalty missed) Jared Marks; (penalty scored) Craig Harris; (penalty scored) Will Evans |

| 17 September 2022 | Llansannan(4) | 1–2 | Glantraeth(4) | Llansannan |
| 14:30 BST | Leon Gierke 63' (pen.) | | Dylan Williams 60' (pen.), 78' | Stadium: Llan Siro; Referee: Martin Trigg |

| 16 September 2022 | Llandudno Amateurs(5) | 1–7 | Llanrug United(4) | Llandudno |
| 19:30 BST | Aaron Rogers 80' | | Jonathan Sadler 8'; Kevin Lloyd 33', 57'; Sion Phillips 47'; Morgan Williams 55'; Iwan Bohana 77'; Osian Williams 86' | Stadium: The Oval; Referee: William Parry |

| 17 September 2022 | Llay Welfare(3) | 3–6 | Flint Mountain(3) | Llay |
| 14:30 BST | Cole Bickerton 47'; Jared Taylor 90'; Matthew Worrall 90+1' | | Sam Molyneux 17'; Kyle Smyth 44' (pen.), 74'; Corey Smart 55', 75', 82' | Stadium: The Ring; Referee: Andy Harms |

| 17 September 2022 | Mochdre Sports(4) | 0–3 | Chirk AAA(2) | Mochdre |
| 14:30 BST | | | Louie Middlehurt 15'; Dale Davies 44', 49' | Stadium: Swan Road; Referee: Arthur Smallman |

| 16 September 2022 | Conwy Borough(2) | 3–2 | Kinmel Bay(4) | Conwy |
| 19:45 BST | Tyler Oakley-Evans 50' (o.g.); Sean McCaffery 81'; Cian Evans 90+6' | | Tate Walker 25'; Anthony Jones 81' | Stadium: Y Morfa Stadium; Referee: Conor Charlton-Fleming |

| 17 September 2022 | Porthmadog(2) | 3–4 | Mold Alexandra(2) | Porthmadog |
| 14:30 BST | Alex Boss 17', 31'; Callum Parry 54' | | Rhys Nash 39', 56', 80'; Matthew Lewis 67' | Stadium: Y Traeth; Attendance: 223; Referee: Conor Charlton-Fleming |

| 17 September 2022 | Llangefni Town(3) | 1–2 | Llandudno Albion(3) | Llangefni |
| 14:30 BST | Gerwyn Roberts 69' | | Dean Seager 50'; Adam Hold 78' (pen.) | Stadium: Bob Parry Field; Attendance: 190; Referee: Colin Dukes |

| 17 September 2022 | Talysarn Celts(4) | 0–1 | FC Queens Park(4) | Talysarn |
| 14:30 BST | | | Curtis Neary 3' | Stadium: Gloddfa Glai; Attendance: 150; Referee: Wayne Geraghty |

| 17 September 2022 | Y Felinheli(3) | 1–1 (4–2 p) | Y Glannau(5) | Y Felinheli |
| 14:30 BST | Jack Cain 26' | | Alec Williams 52' (pen.) | Stadium: Cae Seilo; Attendance: 100; Referee: Tony Samuel |
| | Penalties |
| | Osian Pritchard (penalty scored); Gavin Lloyd-Jones (penalty scored); Iwan Owen (penalty scored); Dylan Jones (penalty scored) | | (penalty scored) Harrison Bellis; (penalty scored) Jordan Davies-Jones; (penalty missed) Alec Williams; (penalty missed) Chris McQuillen |

| 17 September 2022 | Trearddur Bay(5) | 1–5 | Penycae(3) | Trearddur |
| 14:30 BST | Asa Thomas 49' | | Ben Duffy 31', 49'; Drew Wickens 59'; Joshua Mazzarella 65'; Ben Buley 88' | Stadium: Lon Isallt; Referee: William Peel |

| 17 September 2022 | Abermule(4) | 2–2 (3–5 p) | Hawarden Rangers(3) | Abermule |
| 14:30 BST | Lloyd Cornish 42', 64' | | Paul Lindfield 64'; James Ratcliffe 87' | Stadium: The Community Centre Ground; Referee: Stephen Fisher |
| | Penalties |
| | Gregory Pryce (penalty missed); George Davies (penalty scored); Gethin Stephens (penalty scored); David Laird (penalty scored) | | (penalty scored) James Ratcliffe; (penalty scored) Lewis Wright; (penalty scored) Joshua Edwards; (penalty scored) Thomas Gunson; (penalty scored) Joshua Davies |

| 17 September 2022 | Machynlleth(4) | 0–3 | Prestatyn Town(2) | Machynlleth |
| 14:30 BST | | | Liam Van Gelder 47'; Tom Hilditch 51', 80' | Stadium: Y Plas Green; Referee: Iolo Williams |

| 17 September 2022 | Llanfair United(3) | 1–2 | Llanuwchllyn(3) | Llanfair Caereinion |
| 12:00 BST | Nyasha Mwamuka 45' | | Sam Evans 10'; Daniel Roberts 65' | Stadium: Mount Field; Attendance: 55; Referee: Richard Edwards |

| 17 September 2022 | Bow Street(3) | 6–5 | Bangor 1876(3) | Rhydypennau |
| 14:30 BST | Rhydian Davies 3' (pen.), 44' (pen.); Ben Davies 18', 90+5'; Dafydd Carruthers 27'; Tomos Roberts 59' | | Cameron Barry 35'; Corrig McGonigle 45+3', 89' (pen.); Tom Clarke 48'; Gethin Thomas 76' | Stadium: Cae Piod; Attendance: 302; Referee: Aled Jones |

=== South ===
| 17 September 2022 | Calsonic Kansei Swiss Valley(4) | 1–5 | Aber Valley(4) | Llanelli |
| 14:00 BST | Michael Murphy 54' | | Zak Thomas 17'; Jacob James 29', 37'; Nathan Radzimierski 55', 61' | Stadium: Calsonic Sports & Social Club; Attendance: 250; Referee: Alan Jenkins |

| 16 September 2022 | Abergavenny Town(2) | 1–1 (4–1 p) | Treharris Athletic(3) | Abergavenny |
| 19:30 BST | Rhys Thomas 41' | | Dylan Amin 53' | Stadium: Pen-y-Pound Stadium; Referee: George Nemes |
| | Penalties |
| | Greg Preece (penalty scored); Rhys Tandy (penalty scored); Jac Evans (penalty scored); James Young (penalty scored) | | (penalty missed) Haben Samson; (penalty scored) Kallum Thomas; (penalty missed) Myles Corson |

| 17 September 2022 | Canton Liberal(4) | 5–1 | West End(4) | Canton, Cardiff |
| 14:30 BST | Tyrrell Webbe 12', 23', 25', 73'; Jack Kane 71' | | Chris Hole 50' | Stadium: Lawrenny Avenue; Referee: Kevin Morgan |

| 17 September 2022 | Afan Lido(2) | 0–1 | Hakin United(5) | Aberavon |
| 14:30 BST | | | Brennan Devonald 87' | Stadium: Marston's Stadium; Attendance: 142; Referee: Kris Hames |

| 17 September 2022 | Trefelin BGC(2) | 5–0 | Llandrindod Wells(3) | Port Talbot |
| 14:30 BST | Mark Jones 24', 32'; James Barker 34' (o.g.); Roan Piper 40'; John Hall 41' | | | Stadium: Ynys Park; Referee: Jordan Harman |

| 16 September 2022 | Risca United(3) | 4–2 | Aberbargoed Buds(4) | Llanfabon |
| 19:45 BST | Owen Thomas 28'; Joel Powell 43', 77'; Connor Hanford 83' | | Joseph Ogugua 54', 84' | Stadium: CCB Centre For Sporting Excellence; Attendance: 205; Referee: Mark Gardiner |

| 17 September 2022 | Croesyceiliog(3) | 2–1 | Ynysygerwn(3) | Croesyceiliog |
| 14:30 BST | Daniel Clouth 11', 90+7' (pen.) | | Ryan Morris 85' | Stadium: Woodland Road; Referee: Huw Marfell |

| 17 September 2022 | Pill(4) | 4–0 | Caldicot Town(3) | Newport |
| 14:30 BST | Leo Ross 3', 14', 89'; Robert Millar 8' | | | Stadium: The YMCA Ground; Referee: Joseph Gibson |

| 17 September 2022 | Llanelli Town(2) | 4–0 | Goytre(3) | Llanelli |
| 14:30 BST | Elijah Phipps 22'; Tim Parker 63'; Josef Hopkins 67' (pen.); Sean Cronin 83' (pen.) | | | Stadium: Stebonheath Park; Attendance: 122; Referee: Daniel Richardson |

| 16 September 2022 | Penydarren BGC(3) | 4–0 | Ynyshir Albions(2) | Penydarren |
| 19:30 BST | Aarran Caffell 33', 80'; Ricky Jones 54'; Joshua Brogden 67' | | | Stadium: The Bont Playing Fields; Referee: Kim Fisher |

| 17 September 2022 | Baglan Dragons(3) | 1–1 (1–4 p) | Pontardawe Town(2) | Baglan |
| 14:30 BST | Tom Randall 69' | | Gabriel Kircough 44' | Stadium: Evans Bevan Playing Fields; Referee: Thomas Bevan |
| | Penalties |
| | Kieran Parsons (penalty missed); Tom Randall (penalty missed); Lewis Holmes (penalty scored) | | (penalty scored) Lewis Reed; (penalty scored) Gabriel Kircough; (penalty scored) Simon Grmay; (penalty scored) Harri Lawson |

| 17 September 2022 | Cefn Cribwr(3) | 1–2 | Newport City(3) | Clydach Vale |
| 14:30 BST | Danny Woolfenden 31' | | Gareth Phillips 24'; Dean Clifford 76' | Stadium: King George V New Field; Attendance: 15; Referee: Luke Mansell |

| 17 September 2022 | Cwmbrân Celtic(2) | 1–0 | Ammanford(2) | Cwmbrân |
| 14:30 BST | Dominic Connor 11' | | | Stadium: Celtic Park; Referee: Ieuan Lewis |

| 17 September 2022 | Trethomas Bluebirds(3) | 6–0 | Ton Pentre(4) | Llanfabon |
| 14:30 BST | Gareth Tedstone 7'; Ethan Edwards 31'; Levi Rees 45'; Charlie Loss 45+3', 52'; Adam Raymond 86' | | | Stadium: CCB Centre For Sporting Excellence; Referee: Tegid Richards |

| 17 September 2022 | Pencoed Athletic(4) | 6–2 | Brecon Corinthians(3) | Pencoed |
| 14:30 BST | Jack Delve 27', 35', 62'; Harry Davies 58'; Jacob Sayer 70'; Jordan Gittins 83' | | Joel Evans 55', 82' | Stadium: Felindre Road; Referee: Paul Fisher |

| 17 September 2022 | Chepstow Town(3) | 1–0 | Rockspur(5) | Chepstow |
| 14:30 BST | Joshua Gibson 65' | | | Stadium: Larkfield Park |

| 17 September 2022 | Treowen Stars(3) | 0–6 | Cardiff Corinthians(4) | Newbridge |
| 14:30 BST | | | David Biggs 10'; Christopher Worsley 34'; Isaac Wigley 38'; Corey Hallett 52'; Bradley Phillips 73'; Christopher Quick 87' | Stadium: Bush Park; Referee: Phillip Bates |

| 17 September 2022 | Aberfan Social(5) | 2–0 | Porthcawl Town Athletic(4) | Aberfan |
| 14:30 BST | Jaymie Wearn 4' (pen.); Lewis Morris 15' | | | Stadium: Grove Field; Referee: Sam Lloyd |

== Second round ==
Matches for this round were played on Saturday 8 October 2022. Cymru Premier teams entered the competition in this round. The procedure of seeding the 28 clubs from the JD Cymru Premier (12), JD Cymru North (8) and JD Cymru South (8), instituted in 2021–22 the competition, was maintained. The seeded clubs were all drawn away from home in Round 2.

=== North ===
| 8 October 2022 | Risca United(3) | 1–5 | Penybont(1) | Risca |
| 14:00 | Unknown 16' | | Billy Borge 23'; Keyon Reffel 34'; Sam Snaith 48'; Kostya Georgievsky 55'; Nathan Wood 59' (pen.) | Stadium: Ty-Isaf Park |

| 8 October 2022 | Rhyl 1879(3) | 0–2 | Ruthin Town(2) | Rhyl |
| 14:30 | | | Morris 47'; Owen 73' | Stadium: Belle Vue |

| 8 October 2022 | FC Queens Park(4) | 0–3 | Airbus UK Broughton(2) | Wrexham |
| 14:30 | | | Brad Knight 25'; Jake Eyre 73'; Joe Palmer 89' | Stadium: The Dunks |

| 8 October 2022 | Prestatyn Town(2) | 2–0 | Llandudno(2) | Prestatyn |
| 14:30 | D. Atkins 55'; Sean Coulton 57' | | | Stadium: Bastion Road |

| 8 October 2022 | Pontardawe Town(3) | 0–0 (5–4 p) | Cambrian & Clydach Vale(2) | Pontardawe |
| 14:30 | | | | Stadium: Parc Ynysderw |
| | Penalties |
| | T.Aylward (penalty scored); I.Butcup (penalty scored); G.Kircough (penalty scored); R.Thomas (penalty scored); J.Dorward (penalty scored); O.O'Brien (penalty missed); T. Georgievsky (penalty missed) | | L.Reed (penalty scored); D.Thomas (penalty scored); C.Strinati (penalty missed); C.Wilcox (penalty missed); J.Welch (penalty missed); L.Eason (penalty scored); C.Davies (penalty scored) |

| 8 October 2022 | Pill(4) | 2–1 | Cardiff Metropolitan University(1) | Newport |
| 14:30 | L.Sommers 17'; B.Lawrence 72' | | Lewis Rees 56' | Stadium: The YMCA Ground |

| 8 October 2022 | Penydarren(3) | 2–1 | Swansea University(2) | Penydarren |
| 14:30 | G.Kabza 66'; Alex Long 86' | | G.Sellik 37' | Stadium: The Bont Playing Fields |

| 8 October 2022 | Penycae(3) | 1–4 | Guilsfield(2) | Wrexham |
| 14:30 | H.Killik 90' | | J.Astley 10' 60' 84'; J.Hyne 22' | Stadium: The SoccerMillion Riverside Arena |

| 8 October 2022 | Pencoed Athletic(4) | 0–0 (3–4 p) | Aberystwyth Town(1) | Pencoed |
| 14:30 | | | | Stadium: Felindre Road |
| | Penalties |
| | W.Jones (penalty missed); J.Delv (penalty scored); B.Wells (penalty scored); G.Davies (penalty scored); A.Carpenter (penalty missed) | | J.Thorn (penalty scored); A.Darlington (penalty missed); H.Arnison (penalty scored); J.Owen (penalty scored); N.Flint (penalty scored) |

| 8 October 2022 | Newport City(3) | 0–2 | Carmarthen Town(2) | Newport |
| 14:30 | | | Liam Thomas 59'; Scott Tancock 89' | Stadium: Newport Stadium |

| 8 October 2022 | Mold Alexandra(3) | 3–1 | Holyhead Hotspur(2) | Mold |
| 14:30 | S.Watkins 19'; D.Warren 51'; C.Freeman 85' | | Kenleigh Owens 39' | Stadium: Alyn Park |

| 8 October 2022 | Llanuwchllyn(3) | 0–5 | Holywell Town(2) | Bala |
| 14:30 | | | Dave Forbes 68' 69' 70'; H.Ozlu 69'; Llan Ap Gareth Jones 90' | Stadium: Church Street |

| 8 October 2022 | Llanrug United(4) | 0–3 | Gresford Athletic(2) | Llanrug |
| 14:30 | | | P.Johnson 12'; J.Barrat 19'; George Macready 72' | Stadium: Eithin Duon |

| 8 October 2022 | Llandudno Albion(3) | 0–3 | Buckley Town(2) | Llandudno |
| 14:30 | | | C.Littler 17'; J.Davis 45+3'; A.Bellis 48' | Stadium: Measdu Park |

| 8 October 2022 | Hawarden Rangers(3) | 1–6 | Bala Town(1) | Hawarden |
| 14:30 | T.Bridges 85' | | James Davies 9'; Roscow 20' 30' 49'; Nathan Peate 26'; Newell 77' | Stadium: Gladstone Playing Fields |

| 8 October 2022 | Hakin United(5) | 4–1 | Taff's Well(2) | Milford Haven |
| 14:30 | A.Bevan 21'; N.Woodrow 56'; S.Walsh 69'; J.Harding 77' | | David Lyon 28' | Stadium: The Observatory Ground |

=== South ===
| 8 October 2022 | Glantraeth(4) | 0–5 | Cefn Druids(2) | Bodorgan |
| 14:30 | | | | Stadium: Trefdraeth |

| 8 October 2022 | Flint Mountain(3) | 0–4 | Caernarfon Town(1) | Flint |
| 14:30 | | | | Stadium: Cae-y-Castell |

| 8 October 2022 | Y Felinheli(3) | 1–4 | Conwy Borough(2) | Y Felinheli |
| 14:30 | | | | Stadium: Cae Seilo |

| 8 October 2022 | Denbigh Town(3) | 1–5 | Connah's Quay Nomads(1) | Denbigh |
| 14:30 | | | | Stadium: Central Park |

| 8 October 2022 | Cwmbran Celtic(2) | 2–2 (3–0 p) | Llantwit Major(2) | Cwmbran |
| 14:30 | | | | Stadium: Celtic Park |

| 8 October 2022 | Croesyceiliog(3) | 0–5 | Briton Ferry Llansawel(2) | Cwmbran |
| 14:30 | | | | Stadium: Dennis Park |

| 8 October 2022 | Chirk AAA(2) | 1–1 (2–4 p) | The New Saints(1) | Chirk |
| 14:30 | | | | Stadium: Holyhead Road |

| 8 October 2022 | Chepstow Town(3) | 1–2 | Pontypridd United(1) | Chepstow |
| 14:30 | | | | Stadium: Larkfield Park |

| 8 October 2022 | Cardiff Corinthians(4) | 1–8 | Newtown(1) | Cardiff |
| 14:30 | | | | Stadium: The Riverside Ground |

| 8 October 2022 | Canton Liberal(4) | 1–1 (1–3 p) | Llanelli Town(2) | Canton |
| 14:30 | | | | Stadium: Lawrenny Avenue |

| 8 October 2022 | Bow Street(3) | 1–4 | Colwyn Bay(2) | Rhydypennau |
| 14:30 | | | | Stadium: Cae Piod |

| 8 October 2022 | Abergavenny Town(2) | 1–1 (2–4 p) | Goytre United | Abergavenny |
| 14:30 | | | | Stadium: Pen-Y-Pound Stadium |

| 8 October 2022 | Aberfan Social(5) | 1–5 | Trefelin(2) | Aberfan |
| 14:30 | | | | Stadium: Grove Field |

| 8 October 2022 | Aber Valley(4) | 1–3 | Barry Town United(2) | Abertridwr |
| 14:30 | | | | Stadium: Abertridwr Park |

| 8 October 2022 | Caersws(3) | 0–1 | Flint Town United(1) | Caersws |
| 17:15 | | | | Stadium: Recreation Ground |

| 8 October 2022 | Trethomas Bluebirds(3) | 2–1 | Haverfordwest County(1) | Trethomas |
| 17:45 | | | | Stadium: CCB Centre For Sporting Excellence |

== Third round ==
Matches for this round were played on Saturday 12 November 2022.

| 12 November 2022 | Cefn Druids(2) | 3–4 | Llanelli Town(2) | Cefn Mawr |
| 14:30 | | | | Stadium: The Rock |

| 12 November 2022 | Ruthin Town(2) | 3–4 | Pontypridd United(1) | Ruthin |
| 14:30 | | | | Stadium: Memorial Playing Fields |

| 12 November 2022 | Pontardawe Town(3) | 3–1 | Pill(4) | Pontardawe |
| 14:30 | | | | Stadium: Parc Ynysderw |

| 12 November 2022 | Guilsfield(2) | 6–3 | Goytre United(2) | Guilsfield |
| 14:30 | | | | Stadium: Clos Mytton |

| 12 November 2022 | Conwy Borough(2) | 0–3 | Penybont(1) | Conwy |
| 14:30 | | | | Stadium: Y Morfa Stadium |

| 12 November 2022 | Cwmbran Celtic(2) | 4–3 | Carmarthen Town(2) | Cwmbran |
| 14:30 | | | | Stadium: Celtic Park |

| 12 November 2022 | Buckley Town(2) | 2–0 | Prestatyn Town(2) | Buckley |
| 14:30 | | | | Stadium: The Globe |

| 12 November 2022 | Aberystwyth Town(1) | 1–3 | Newtown(1) | Aberystwyth |
| 14:30 | | | | Stadium: Park Avenue |

| 12 November 2022 | Connah's Quay Nomads(1) | 4–0 | Colwyn Bay(2) | Connah's Quay |
| 14:30 | | | | Stadium: Deeside Stadium |

| 12 November 2022 | Barry Town United(2) | 0–2 | Gresford Athletic(2) | Barry |
| 14:30 | | | | Stadium: Jenner Park Stadium |

| 12 November 2022 | Airbus UK Broughton(1) | 2–1 | Trefelin(2) | Broughton |
| 14:30 | | | | Stadium: The Airfield |

| 11 November 2022 | The New Saints(1) | 2–1 | Caernarfon Town(1) | Oswestry |
| 14:30 | Brobbel 3'; Redmond 76' | | Davies 89' (o.g.) | Stadium: Park Hall |

| 12 November 2022 | Bala Town(1) | 2–0 | Flint Town United(1) | Bala |
| 14:30 | | | | Stadium: Maes Tegid |

| 12 November 2022 | Penydarren(3) | 1–0 | Trethomas Bluebirds(3) | Penydarren |
| 14:30 | | | | Stadium: The Bont Playing Fields |

| 12 November 2022 | Hakin United(5) | 1–5 | Holywell Town(2) | Milford Haven |
| 14:30 | | | | Stadium: The Observatory Ground |

| 12 November 2022 | Mold Alexandra(2) | 0–4 | Briton Ferry Llansawel(2) | Mold |
| 14:30 | | | | Stadium: Alyn Park |

== Fourth round ==
Matches for this round were played on Saturday 14 January 2023 except for the Cwmbran Celtic versus Pennydarren tie which was postponed multiple times and eventually completed on 25 January.

| 14 January 2023 | Guilsfield(2) | 1–2 | Holywell Town(2) | Guilsfield |
| 14:00 | | | | Stadium: Clos Mytton |

| 14 January 2023 | Gresford Athletic(2) | 0–2 | Penybont(1) | Gresford |
| 14:00 | | | | Stadium: Clappers Lane |

| 14 January 2023 | Briton Ferry Llansawel(2) | 2–2 (8–7 p) | Buckley Town(2) | Briton Ferry |
| 14:00 | | | | Stadium: Old Road |

| 14 January 2023 | The New Saints(1) | 7–0 | Newtown(1) | Oswestry |
| 14:00 | | | | Stadium: Park Hall |

| 14 January 2023 | Pontardawe Town(2) | 1–1 (4–5 p) | Airbus UK Broughton(1) | Pontardawe |
| 14:00 | | | | Stadium: Parc Ynysderw |

| 14 January 2023 | Bala Town(1) | 2–1 | Pontypridd United(1) | Bala |
| 14:00 | | | | Stadium: Maes Tegid |

| 14 January 2023 | Llanelli Town(2) | 0–2 | Connah's Quay Nomads(1) | Llanelli |
| 17:15 | | | | Stadium: Stebonheath Park |

| 25 January 2023 | Penydarren(3) | 2–3 | Cwmbran Celtic(2) | Pennydarren |
| 19:30 | | | | Stadium: The Bont |

== Fifth round ==
Matches for this round were played on 4 and 5 February 2023.

| 4 February 2023 | Cwmbran Celtic(2) | 1–3 | The New Saints(1) | Cwmbran |
| 14:00 | | | | Stadium: Celtic Park |

| 4 February 2023 | Bala Town(1) | 2–0 | Briton Ferry Llansawel(2) | Bala |
| 14:00 | | | | Stadium: Maes Tegid |

| 4 February 2023 | Connah's Quay Nomads(1) | 5–0 | Airbus UK Broughton(1) | Connah's Quay |
| 14:00 | | | | Stadium: Deeside Stadium |

| 5 February 2023 | Penybont(1) | 2–1 | Holywell Town(2) | Bridgend |
| 12:45 | | | | Stadium: Bryntirion Park |

== Semi-finals ==
Matches for this round were played on 3 and 4 March 2023.

| 3 March 2023 | Bala Town(1) | 3–2 | Connah's Quay Nomads(1) | Flint |
| 19:45 | | | | Stadium: Essity Stadium |

| 4 March 2023 | Penybont(1) | 0–2 | The New Saints(1) | Carmarthen |
| 12:45 | | | | Stadium: Richmond Park |

== Final ==
The final was played on Sunday 30 April 2023.

| 30 April 2023 | The New Saints(1) | 6–0 | Bala Town(1) | Bangor |
| 16:45 | | Report | | Stadium: Nantporth; Referee: Nick Pratt |
