= 2020–21 Ardal NW =

Ardal NW
- Season: 2020–21
- Champions: None
- Promoted: None
- Relegated: None

The 2020–21 Ardal NW season (also known as the 2020–21 Lock Stock Ardal NW season for sponsorship reasons) was to be the first season of the new third-tier northern region football in Welsh football pyramid, part of the Ardal Leagues. Teams were to play each other twice on a home and away basis.

Due to the COVID-19 pandemic in Wales, the Football Association of Wales cancelled the 2020–21 seasons of the Ardal Leagues and below.

== Teams ==
Normally, the league is made up of 16 teams competing for one automatic promotion place to Cymru North, whilst the second place team goes into a play-off with the second place team of Ardal NE. Three teams aree relegated to tier 4.

=== Team changes ===
==== To Ardal NW ====
From Welsh Alliance League Division 1

- Denbigh Town
- Llandudno Albion
- Llanrwst United
- Nantlle Vale
- St Asaph City
- Blaenau Amateurs

Promoted from Welsh Alliance League Division 2

- Y Felinheli

From Welsh National League Premier Division

- Mold Alexandra
- Brymbo
- Llanuwchllyn
- Llay Welfare
- Saltney Town
- Rhydymwyn
- Brickfield Rangers
- Rhostyllen

Relegated from Cymru North

- Porthmadog

=== Stadia and locations ===
Locations of teams in the 2020–21 Ardal NW

| Team | Location | Home Ground | Capacity |
|---|---|---|---|
| Blaenau Amateurs | Blaenau Ffestiniog | Cae Clyd | 1,000 |
| Brickfield Rangers | Wrexham | Clywedog Park | 1,000 |
| Brymbo | Broughton | Brymbo Sports Complex | 1,000 |
| Denbigh Town | Denbigh | Central Park | 1,200 |
| Llandudno Albion | Llandudno | Maesdu Park | 1,013 |
| Llanrwst United | Llanrwst | Gwydyr Park | 2,000 |
| Llanuwchllyn | Bala | Maes Tegid | 3,000 |
| Llay Welfare | Llay | The Ring | 1,000 |
| Mold Alexandra | Mold | Alyn Park | 3,000 |
| Nantlle Vale | Penygroes | Maes Dulyn | 1,000 |
| Porthmadog | Porthmadog | Y Traeth | 2,000 |
| Rhostyllen | Rhostyllen | Vicarage Hill | 1,000 |
| Rhydymwyn | Rhydmwyn | Vicarage Road | 1,000 |
| Saltney Town | Saltney | Saltney Community Centre | 1,000 |
| St Asaph City | St Asaph | Roe Plas | 1,000 |
| Y Felinheli | Y Felinheli | Cae Seilo | 1,000 |

Source: Ardal NW Ground Information

== Season overview ==
On 28 July 2020, the Football Association of Wales announced that this league would be named Ardal NW and would be sponsored by Lock Stock Self Storage. Ardal NE & Ardal NW divisions will make up the Ardal Northern region of Tier 3 in the men's Welsh domestic game.
Since anti-COVID-19 restrictions were put in place by FAW., clubs could have trained in groups of 15 and contact training was allowed at all-levels of football. However, competitive and exhibition matches were still not allowed to take place.

== League table ==
| Pos | Team | Pld | W | D | L | GF | GA | GD | Pts | Promotion, qualification or relegation |
|---|---|---|---|---|---|---|---|---|---|---|
| 1 | Blaenau Amateurs | 0 | 0 | 0 | 0 | 0 | 0 | 0 | 0 | Promoted to Cymru North |
| 2 | Brickfield Rangers | 0 | 0 | 0 | 0 | 0 | 0 | 0 | 0 | Qualified for the Ardal Northern Play-Off |
| 3 | Brymbo | 0 | 0 | 0 | 0 | 0 | 0 | 0 | 0 | |
| 4 | Denbigh Town | 0 | 0 | 0 | 0 | 0 | 0 | 0 | 0 | |
| 5 | Llandudno Albion | 0 | 0 | 0 | 0 | 0 | 0 | 0 | 0 | |
| 6 | Llanrwst United | 0 | 0 | 0 | 0 | 0 | 0 | 0 | 0 | |
| 7 | Llanuwchllyn | 0 | 0 | 0 | 0 | 0 | 0 | 0 | 0 | |
| 8 | Llay Welfare | 0 | 0 | 0 | 0 | 0 | 0 | 0 | 0 | |
| 9 | Mold Alexandra | 0 | 0 | 0 | 0 | 0 | 0 | 0 | 0 | |
| 10 | Nantlle Vale | 0 | 0 | 0 | 0 | 0 | 0 | 0 | 0 | |
| 11 | Porthmadog | 0 | 0 | 0 | 0 | 0 | 0 | 0 | 0 | |
| 12 | Rhostyllen | 0 | 0 | 0 | 0 | 0 | 0 | 0 | 0 | |
| 13 | Rhydymwyn | 0 | 0 | 0 | 0 | 0 | 0 | 0 | 0 | |
| 14 | Saltney Town | 0 | 0 | 0 | 0 | 0 | 0 | 0 | 0 | Relegated to Tier 4 Leagues |
| 15 | St Asaph City | 0 | 0 | 0 | 0 | 0 | 0 | 0 | 0 | Relegated to Tier 4 Leagues |
| 16 | Y Felinheli | 0 | 0 | 0 | 0 | 0 | 0 | 0 | 0 | Relegated to Tier 4 Leagues |

Source: Ardal NE
Rules for classification: 1) Points; 2) Goal difference; 3) Goals scored; 4) Matches won; 5) Play-off.

== Results ==
| Home \ Away | BLA | BRI | BRY | DEN | LDA | LRU | LNW | LYW | MOL | NTL | POR | RHS | RHY | SAL | SAC | YFL |
|---|---|---|---|---|---|---|---|---|---|---|---|---|---|---|---|---|
| Blaenau Amateurs | — | | | | | | | | | | | | | | | |
| Brickfield Rangers | | — | | | | | | | | | | | | | | |
| Brymbo | | | — | | | | | | | | | | | | | |
| Denbigh Town | | | | — | | | | | | | | | | | | |
| Llandudno Albion | | | | | — | | | | | | | | | | | |
| Llanrwst United | | | | | | — | | | | | | | | | | |
| Llanuwchllyn | | | | | | | — | | | | | | | | | |
| Llay Welfare | | | | | | | | — | | | | | | | | |
| Mold Alexandra | | | | | | | | | — | | | | | | | |
| Nantlle Vale | | | | | | | | | | — | | | | | | |
| Porthmadog | | | | | | | | | | | — | | | | | |
| Rhostyllen | | | | | | | | | | | | — | | | | |
| Rhydymwyn | | | | | | | | | | | | | — | | | |
| Saltney Town | | | | | | | | | | | | | | — | | |
| St Asaph City | | | | | | | | | | | | | | | — | |
| Y Felinheli | | | | | | | | | | | | | | | | — |

Source: Ardal NE Match Fixtures
Legend: Blue = home team win; Yellow = draw; Red = away team win.
