= 2021–22 Ardal NW =

Ardal NW
- Season: 2021–22
- Champions: Mold Alexandra
- Promoted: Mold Alexandra; Porthmadog
- Relegated: St Asaph City; Brymbo; Blaenau Amateurs

== Teams ==
The league was made up of 16 teams competing for one automatic promotion place to Cymru North, whilst the second-placed team qualified for a play-off with the second-placed team of Ardal NE. Three teams were relegated to Tier 4.

=== Stadia and locations ===
Locations of teams in the 2021–22 Ardal NW

Team	Location	Home Ground	Capacity
Blaenau Amateurs	Blaenau Ffestiniog	Cae Clyd	1,000
Brickfield Rangers	Wrexham	Clywedog Park	1,000
Brymbo	Broughton	Brymbo Sports Complex	1,000
Denbigh Town	Denbigh	Central Park	1,200
Llandudno Albion	Llandudno	Maesdu Park	1,013
Llanrwst United	Llanrwst	Gwydyr Park	2,000
Llanuwchllyn	Bala	Maes Tegid	3,000
Llay Welfare	Llay	The Ring	1,000
Mold Alexandra	Mold	Alyn Park	3,000
Nantlle Vale	Penygroes	Maes Dulyn	1,000
Porthmadog	Porthmadog	Y Traeth	2,000
Rhostyllen	Rhostyllen	Vicarage Hill	1,000
Rhydymwyn	Rhydmwyn	Vicarage Road	1,000
Saltney Town	Saltney	Saltney Community Centre	1,000
St Asaph City	St Asaph	Roe Plas	1,000
Y Felinheli	Y Felinheli	Cae Seilo	1,000

Source: Ardal NW Ground Information

== League table ==
Pos	Team	Pld	W	D	L	GF	GA	GD	Pts	Promotion, qualification or relegation
1	Mold Alexandra (C, P)	30	26	2	2	107	29	+78	80	Promotion to Cymru North
2	Porthmadog (O, P)	30	22	3	5	95	25	+70	69	Qualification for the Ardal Northern play-off
3	Denbigh Town	30	21	5	4	105	37	+68	68	
4	Llanrwst United	30	13	12	5	60	35	+25	51	
5	Llay Welfare	30	16	3	11	75	60	+15	51	
6	Llanuwchllyn	30	15	5	10	67	51	+16	50	Transferred to Ardal NE
7	Llandudno Albion	30	13	6	11	67	54	+13	45	
8	Saltney Town	30	12	7	11	69	59	+10	43	
9	Nantlle Vale	30	11	7	12	52	49	+3	40	
10	Rhostyllen	30	10	5	15	66	67	−1	35	
11	Y Felinheli	30	9	8	13	41	61	−20	35	
12	Brickfield Rangers	30	9	3	18	79	75	+4	30	
13	Rhydymwyn	30	8	7	15	43	84	−41	28 (Note: Rhydymwyn were deducted three points.)	
14	St Asaph City (R)	30	7	5	18	43	78	−35	26	Relegation to Tier 4
15	Brymbo (R)	30	5	3	22	35	134	−99	15 (Note: Brymbo were deducted three points.)	Relegation to Tier 4
16	Blaenau Amateurs (R)	30	1	3	26	19	125	−106	3 (Note: Blaenau Amateurs were deducted three points.)	Relegation to Tier 4

Source: Ardal NW
Rules for classification: 1) Points; 2) Goal difference; 3) Goals scored; 4) Matches won; 5) Play-off.
(C) Champions; (O) Play-off winners; (P) Promoted; (R) Relegated

== Results ==
Home \ Away	BLA	BRI	BRY	DEN	LDA	LRU	LNW	LYW	MOL	NTL	POR	RHS	RHY	SAL	SAC	YFL
Blaenau Amateurs	—	0–9	2–3	1–4	2–2	0–4	0–2	1–4	1–6	0–3	0–4	1–7	0–3	0–7	0–2	0–1
Brickfield Rangers	9–1	—	2–1	3–3	1–3	1–2	3–4	4–3	3–5	2–1	1–3	5–2	2–3	1–5	4–2	0–1
Brymbo	2–1	0–15	—	0–10	0–5	0–4	1–3	1–2	1–6	0–7	0–2	3–2	2–3	3–1	0–5	2–2
Denbigh Town	7–0	2–1	8–1	—	3–0	2–1	3–1	7–1	1–1	3–1	0–3	4–1	1–2	4–2	4–5	6–0
Llandudno Albion	6–1	4–1	11–0	0–3	—	1–1	0–1	4–2	2–5	1–0	0–2	2–1	1–2	4–3	0–3	1–1
Llanrwst United	5–0	3–0	2–2	1–2	2–0	—	2–1	3–2	0–2	3–0	0–0	1–5	7–0	0–0	2–1	2–0
Llanuwchllyn	4–0	4–1	4–1	0–4	5–0	4–1	—	3–0	1–3	4–1	1–3	1–1	4–1	1–1	1–0	3–2
Llay Welfare	3–0	3–1	5–1	5–1	0–2	2–2	2–2	—	2–1	5–2	2–1	1–2	3–0	2–0	8–1	4–4
Mold Alexandra	4–0	2–0	3–0	4–1	4–2	1–1	2–1	0–2	—	4–2	3–2	4–1	8–2	5–1	4–0	4–1
Nantlle Vale	1–1	2–2	4–1	0–3	1–1	0–0	3–3	3–2	0–3	—	1–1	2–0	5–0	1–0	3–0	1–0
Porthmadog	3–0	5–1	10–0	0–0	3–0	0–2	1–2	4–2	1–2	2–1	—	5–1	3–0	5–1	1–0	8–0
Rhostyllen	6–0	3–0	5–0	0–2	1–5	4–4	0–0	0–2	0–2	3–2	2–5	—	1–1	4–7	4–0	1–1
Rhydymwyn	6–3	2–1	3–3	0–1	1–1	1–1	3–1	1–2	1–5	1–1	0–5	1–5	—	2–3	1–1	1–0
Saltney Town	6–0	3–3	3–2	1–1	2–2	1–1	5–2	5–0	0–5	0–2	0–4	1–0	2–1	—	5–1	1–1
St Asaph City	2–2	0–1	1–3	0–3	1–4	1–1	5–3	0–1	0–5	1–2	3–8	4–2	1–1	0–3	—	1–0
Y Felinheli	0–2	3–2	3–2	2–2	2–3	2–2	2–1	4–3	0–4	3–0	0–1	1–2	1–0	2–0	2–2	—

Source: Ardal NE Match Fixtures
Legend: Blue = home team win; Yellow = draw; Red = away team win.
