= 2022–23 Cymru South =

Third season of the second-tier Southern region football in Welsh football pyramid

Cymru South
- Season: 2022–23
- Champions: Barry Town United
- Promoted: Barry Town United
- Relegated: Ynyshir Albions; Swansea University

The 2022–23 Cymru South season (also known as the 2022–23 JD Cymru South season for sponsorship reasons) was the fourth season of the second-tier Southern region football in Welsh football pyramid. Teams played each other twice on a home and away basis.

Llantwit Major were the defending champions from the 2021–22 season but were denied a Tier 1 license, so runners-up Pontypridd Town were promoted in their place.

Barry Town United were relegated from the 2021–22 Cymru Premier, returning to the second tier after their five-year spell in the top flight. Abergavenny Town and Pontardawe Town were both promoted as champions of the Ardal SE and Ardal SW respectively, while Ardal SW runners-up Ynyshir Albions defeated Ardal SE runners-up Abertillery Bluebirds in the Ardal Southern play-off to also earn a promotion place.

== Teams ==
The league consisted of 16 clubs; 12 clubs not promoted or relegated in the previous season, 3 clubs promoted from the Ardal Southern Leagues, and 1 club relegated from the Cymru Premier.

=== Team changes ===
==== To Cymru South ====
Promoted from Ardal SE

- Abergavenny Town

Promoted from Ardal SW

- Pontardawe Town
- Ynyshir Albions

Relegated from Cymru Premier

- Barry Town United

==== From Cymru South ====
Promoted to Cymru Premier

- Pontypridd Town

Relegated to Ardal SE

- Risca United
- Undy Athletic

Relegated to Ardal SW

- Port Talbot Town

=== Stadia and Locations ===
Locations of the 2022–23 Cymru South teams

Team	Home City	Home Ground	Capacity
Abergavenny Town	Abergavenny	Pen-y-Pound Stadium	1,500
Afan Lido	Aberavon, Port Talbot	Marston's Stadium	3,000
Ammanford	Ammanford	Recreation Ground	500
Barry Town United	Barry	Jenner Park	2,650
Briton Ferry Llansawel	Briton Ferry	Old Road	1,000
Cambrian & Clydach Vale B.G.C.	Clydach Vale	King George V New Field	900
Carmarthen Town	Carmarthen	Richmond Park	2,500
Cwmbran Celtic	Cwmbran	Celtic Park	350
Goytre United	Goytre, Port Talbot	Glenhafod Park Stadium	1,500
Llanelli Town	Llanelli	Stebonheath Park	3,700
Llantwit Major	Llantwit Major	Windmill Ground	1,000
Pontardawe Town	Pontardawe	Parc Ynysderw	1,000
Swansea University	Swansea	Sketty Lane	1,500
Taff's Well	Taff's Well	Rhiw'r Ddar	2,930
Trefelin BGC	Velindre, Port Talbot	Ynys Park	1,000
Ynyshir Albions	Ynyshir	Ynyshir Oval	2,000

=== Managerial changes ===
Team	Outgoing manager	Manner of departure	Date of vacancy	Position in table	Incoming manager	Date of appointment
Trefelin BGC	(Wales) Richie Ryan	Mutual consent	3 May 2022	Pre-season	(Wales) Andrew Mumford	13 May 2022
Llantwit Major	(Wales) Karl Lewis	Resigned	25 April 2022	Pre-season	(Wales) Stevie Campbell	22 May 2022
Pontardawe Town	(Wales) Andrew Stokes	Signed by Pontypridd Town	16 May 2022	Pre-season	(Wales) Garry Taylor	23 May 2022
Abergavenny Town	(Wales) Sean Wharton	Sacked	17 September 2022	10th	(Wales) Nick Morgan	17 September 2022
Swansea University	(Wales) Wyn Thomas	Sacked	21 September 2022	16th		
Barry Town United	(Wales) Gavin Chesterfield	Signed by Cardiff City	5 November 2022	1st	(Wales) Lee Kendall	6 November 2022
Goytre United	(Wales) Mark Pike	Sacked	27 November 2022	16th	(Wales) Karl Lewis	28 November 2022
Cambrian & Cyldach	(Wales) Scott Young	Resigned	7 December 2022	7th	(Wales) Richie Ryan	21 December 2022
Trefelin BGC	(Wales) Andrew Mumford	Mutual consent	2 March 2023	10th	(Wales) Michael Waters	4 March 2023

== League table ==
Pos	Team	Pld	W	D	L	GF	GA	GD	Pts	Promotion or relegation
1	Barry Town United (C, P)	30	25	3	2	78	25	+53	78	Promotion to Cymru Premier
2	Llanelli Town	30	19	5	6	63	34	+29	62	
3	Briton Ferry Llansawel	30	17	9	4	72	33	+39	60	
4	Carmarthen Town	30	16	4	10	66	41	+25	52	
5	Cambrian & Clydach Vale BGC	30	14	5	11	64	53	+11	47	
6	Afan Lido	30	13	8	9	61	52	+9	47	
7	Llantwit Major	30	13	6	11	46	40	+6	45	
8	Cwmbran Celtic	30	10	8	12	62	53	+9	38	
9	Pontardawe Town	30	12	1	17	51	73	−22	37	
10	Ammanford	30	8	9	13	40	57	−17	33	
11	Taff's Well	30	8	8	14	50	54	−4	32	
12	Goytre United	30	8	8	14	45	67	−22	32	
13	Abergavenny Town	30	9	5	16	35	60	−25	32	
14	Trefelin BGC (Note: Trefelin BGC were reprieved from relegation after no team was relegated to the 2023–24 Cymru South from the 2022–23 Cymru Premier or moved to the 2023–24 Cymru South from the 2022–23 Cymru North.)	30	7	6	17	47	70	−23	27	
15	Swansea University (R)	30	6	8	16	30	64	−34	26	Relegation to Ardal SE or Ardal SW
16	Ynyshir Albions (R)	30	7	3	20	33	67	−34	24	Relegation to Ardal SE or Ardal SW

Source: Cymru South
Rules for classification: 1) Points; 2) Goal difference; 3) Goals scored; 4) Matches won; 5) Play-off.
(C) Champions; (P) Promoted; (R) Relegated

== Results ==
Home \ Away	ABT	AFL	AMM	BAR	BFL	CCV	CAR	CBC	GOU	LLI	LTM	PNT	SWU	TAW	TRE	YNA
Abergavenny Town	—	1–1	0–0	0–1	0–2	2–4	3–1	0–3	3–1	1–0	0–2	2–0	2–3	1–0	1–1	1–0
Afan Lido	1–1	—	2–1	1–4	3–2	1–1	3–0	2–1	2–0	0–1	2–2	3–3	7–1	1–1	3–1	1–0
Ammanford	2–1	4–2	—	3–2	1–2	1–1	0–4	3–2	2–3	0–1	3–2	3–2	2–0	0–5	1–1	2–2
Barry Town United	5–2	8–3	1–1	—	0–1	4–2	1–0	2–1	5–0	3–1	2–1	5–0	5–0	3–1	2–1	5–0
Briton Ferry Llansawel	8–0	1–1	2–1	1–1	—	0–0	1–0	1–2	4–1	1–1	3–0	8–0	2–2	0–0	2–0	2–0
Cambrian & Clydach Vale BGC	1–3	3–1	3–1	1–2	3–2	—	3–1	0–2	4–2	2–3	2–1	1–4	2–3	4–3	6–0	3–2
Carmarthen Town	4–1	0–3	2–2	0–1	2–4	1–0	—	4–3	4–1	1–3	4–1	3–1	5–0	1–1	2–1	2–0
Cwmbran Celtic	2–1	1–4	1–1	1–2	2–2	3–3	3–5	—	1–1	3–3	1–2	6–0	0–0	3–4	1–1	4–1
Goytre United	2–1	2–5	5–0	1–2	3–2	1–1	2–3	1–3	—	1–5	4–3	0–1	2–1	2–2	3–2	1–1
Llanelli Town	6–0	3–1	1–1	1–1	2–2	1–0	0–3	1–0	2–0	—	1–2	0–4	2–0	4–0	1–4	1–0
Llantwit Major	2–1	2–0	1–1	0–1	2–2	3–1	0–0	0–2	1–1	0–1	—	4–1	1–0	2–2	1–2	4–0
Pontardawe Town	4–2	1–2	2–0	1–2	0–3	0–2	1–0	3–4	4–0	1–3	0–3	—	2–3	5–2	2–1	3–0
Swansea University	1–1	1–3	2–1	0–3	1–2	1–0	0–5	1–1	0–0	0–2	0–1	2–3	—	1–1	2–4	2–1
Taff's Well	2–0	2–0	0–1	0–1	3–4	1–2	1–1	1–5	0–2	1–2	0–1	4–1	0–0	—	4–2	3–1
Trefelin BGC	1–3	2–2	4–2	1–2	1–4	2–3	0–3	3–1	2–2	0–4	0–1	5–0	2–2	0–3	—	0–3
Ynyshir Albions	0–1	2–1	1–0	0–2	1–2	2–4	1–5	1–0	1–1	2–7	3–1	0–2	2–1	4–3	2–3	—

Source: Cymru South Match Results
Legend: Blue = home team win; Yellow = draw; Red = away team win.
