= 2022–23 Ardal SE =

Ardal SE
- Season: 2022–23
- Champions: Abertillery Bluebirds
- Promoted: Abertillery Bluebirds
- Relegated: RTB Ebbw Vale; Monmouth Town; Croesyceiliog

The 2022–23 Ardal SE season (also known as the 2022–23 Floodlighting and Electrical Services Ardal SE season for sponsorship reasons) is the second season of the new third-tier southern region football in Welsh football pyramid, part of the Ardal Leagues.

== Teams ==
The league was made up of 16 teams competing for one automatic promotion place to Cymru South, whilst the second-placed team qualified for a play-off with the second-placed team of Ardal SW. Three teams are relegated to Tier 4.

=== Team changes ===
==== To Ardal SE ====
Promoted from Gwent County League Premier Division

- Lliswerry
- Blaenavon Blues
- RTB Ebbw Vale

Promoted from Mid Wales Football League East Division

- Brecon Corinthians

Relegated from Cymru South

- Risca United
- Undy Athletic

==== From Ardal SE ====
Promoted to Cymru South

- Abergavenny Town

Relegated

- Panteg
- Abertillery Excelsiors
- Aberbargoed Buds

Transferred to Ardal NE

- Llandrindod Wells
- Rhayader Town

=== Stadia and locations ===
Locations of teams in the 2022–23 Ardal SE

Team	Location	Home Ground
Abertillery Bluebirds	Abertillery	Abertillery Leisure Centre
Blaenavon Blues	Blaenavon	The Memorial Ground
Brecon Corinthians	Brecon	The Richfield
Caldicot Town	Caldicot	Jubilee Way
Chepstow Town	Chepstow	Larkfield Park
Croesyceiliog	Croesyceiliog	Woodland Road
Goytre	Penperlleni	Plough Road
Lliswerry	Newport	Newport Stadium
Monmouth Town	Penperlleni	Plough Road
Newport City	Newport	Newport Stadium
Risca United	Llanfabon	CCB Centre For Sporting Excellence
RTB Ebbw Vale	Ebbw Vale	Hilltop Stadium
Tredegar Town	Tredegar	Tredegar Leisure Complex
Treowen Stars	Newbridge	Bush Park
Trethomas Bluebirds	Llanfabon	CCB Centre For Sporting Excellence
Undy Athletic	Undy	The Causeway

Source: Ardal SE Ground Information

- (Risca United and Trethomas Bluebirds groundshare, as do Lliswerry and Newport City)

== League table ==
Pos	Team	Pld	W	D	L	GF	GA	GD	Pts	Promotion, qualification or relegation
1	Abertillery Bluebirds (C, P)	30	19	7	4	59	35	+24	64	Promotion to Cymru South
2	Risca United	30	17	11	2	63	34	+29	62	Qualification for the Ardal Southern play-off
3	Undy Athletic	30	18	5	7	65	31	+34	59	
4	Trethomas Bluebirds	30	16	8	6	68	24	+44	56	
5	Caldicot Town	30	17	1	12	53	44	+9	52	
6	Treowen Stars	30	14	9	7	55	39	+16	51	
7	Blaenavon Blues	30	14	7	9	47	34	+13	49	
8	Goytre	30	14	4	12	56	45	+11	46	
9	Chepstow Town	30	13	7	10	51	48	+3	46	
10	Newport City	30	10	4	16	38	59	−21	34	
11	Tredegar Town	30	8	7	15	38	61	−23	31	
12	Brecon Corinthians	30	8	6	16	56	72	−16	30	
13	Lliswerry	30	8	6	16	39	62	−23	30	
14	Croesyceiliog (R)	30	8	5	17	52	73	−21	29	Relegation to Tier 4
15	Monmouth Town (R)	30	5	5	20	38	70	−32	20	Relegation to Tier 4
16	RTB Ebbw Vale (R)	30	3	4	23	34	81	−47	13	Relegation to Tier 4

Source: Ardal SE
Rules for classification: 1) Points; 2) Goal difference; 3) Goals scored; 4) Matches won; 5) Play-off.
(C) Champions; (P) Promoted; (R) Relegated

== Results ==
Home \ Away	ATB	BLE	BRE	CLD	CHP	CRS	GYR	LLI	MON	NPT	RIS	RTB	TDG	TOW	TTB	UND
Abertillery Bluebirds	—	1–1	3–1	3–0	2–4	1–0	3–3	2–1	2–1	0–1	1–1	2–2	3–1	2–0	0–2	3–2
Blaenavon Blues	0–2	—	4–0	1–2	2–1	2–2	2–1	3–1	4–0	1–1	2–1	1–0	0–0	2–2	1–2	1–1
Brecon Corinthians	1–3	0–1	—	2–1	3–2	2–3	1–3	2–2	3–0	2–3	1–1	8–1	5–1	1–3	1–2	2–3
Caldicot Town	1–0	1–1	2–0	—	1–0	3–2	1–0	3–0	3–1	2–0	1–2	5–2	3–1	0–1	2–1	4–1
Chepstow Town	1–4	2–1	3–3	2–1	—	2–2	1–0	3–0	1–1	5–0	1–2	1–0	2–0	1–1	1–4	0–3
Croesyceiliog	1–2	0–3	5–2	7–2	1–2	—	2–4	2–1	3–0	1–1	2–3	2–1	1–3	3–3	1–4	0–2
Goytre	1–2	1–2	2–2	2–1	3–0	5–0	—	1–1	1–0	0–1	0–2	3–1	0–3	3–0	1–2	3–2
Lliswerry	2–3	2–1	2–3	2–0	2–3	1–1	0–1	—	2–1	1–2	2–5	1–0	4–1	1–1	2–2	0–0
Monmouth Town	1–2	0–3	2–3	0–1	3–3	5–2	2–4	0–2	—	1–7	1–2	3–1	2–3	2–1	2–2	0–2
Newport City	0–3	1–0	4–3	0–2	1–2	2–3	1–3	3–2	1–0	—	1–3	3–3	1–1	1–4	0–1	0–3
Risca United	2–2	2–0	6–1	5–1	2–2	3–1	4–1	1–0	3–3	1–0	—	4–1	1–1	1–1	0–0	0–4
RTB Ebbw Vale	1–2	2–4	1–2	0–4	2–1	1–2	1–4	1–0	2–3	2–0	1–2	—	1–2	0–3	0–3	2–2
Tredegar Town	1–1	0–1	1–1	0–6	0–1	2–1	0–4	1–3	2–1	0–2	1–1	5–2	—	1–3	0–2	2–3
Treowen Stars	1–2	2–1	1–1	4–0	0–1	4–2	2–2	1–2	3–0	2–1	0–0	4–2	2–2	—	2–1	0–2
Trethomas Bluebirds	1–2	3–0	5–0	3–0	1–1	3–0	2–0	11–0	1–1	6–0	1–1	0–0	1–2	1–2	—	0–0
Undy Athletic	1–1	1–2	2–0	1–0	3–2	4–0	4–0	4–0	1–2	2–0	1–2	5–1	3–1	1–2	2–1	—

First match(es) will be played: 6 August 2022. Source:
Legend: Blue = home team win; Yellow = draw; Red = away team win.
For upcoming matches, an "a" indicates there is an article about the rivalry between the two participants.
