= 2023–24 Cymru North =

Cymru North
- Season: 2023–24
- Champions: Holywell Town
- Promoted: Flint Town United
- Relegated: Chirk AAA; Llanidloes Town; Porthmadog
- Matches: 240

The 2023–24 Cymru North season (also known as the 2023–24 JD Cymru North season for sponsorship reasons) was the fourth season of the second-tier northern region football league in the Welsh football pyramid.

The runners-up (Flint Town United) were promoted to the 2024–25 Cymru Premier (after league winners Holywell Town were refused a promotion licence). The bottom three teams (Chirk AAA, Llanidloes Town, and Porthmadog) were relegated to either the 2024–25 Ardal NE or 2024–25 Ardal NW.

== Teams ==
The league consisted of 16 clubs - 11 teams remaining from the previous season, two teams relegated from the 2022–23 Cymru Premier, and three promoted from the Ardal Leagues.

Airbus UK Broughton and Flint Town United, who are both based in the North, were relegated from the 2022–23 Cymru Premier. Llanidloes Town were saved from having to move to the Cymru South, with the league board deciding to change the Cymru North into a 17-team league. However, on the 20th of June, Cefn Druids announced their withdrawal from the league, following the decision of their playing squad and staff to leave the club a few weeks prior thus reverting the league to its regular 16-team format.

Three teams were promoted from the Ardal Leagues, with Caersws and Denbigh Town promoted as champions of the 2022–23 Ardal NE and 2022–23 Ardal NW respectively. Bangor 1876 were promoted to the second tier for the first time, after defeating Cefn Albion in a promotion play-off. They replaced the relegated Cymru North teams of Conwy Borough, Holyhead Hotspur, and Penrhyncoch.

=== Stadia and locations ===
Locations of teams in the 2023–24 Cymru North

Team	Home City	Home Ground	Capacity
Airbus UK Broughton	Broughton	The Airfield	1,600
Bangor 1876	Bangor	Nantporth	3,000
Buckley Town	Buckley	The Globe	1,000
Caersws	Caersws	Recreation Ground	4,000
Chirk AAA	Chirk	Holyhead Road	1,000
Denbigh Town	Denbigh	Central Park	1,200
Flint Town United	Flint	Essity Stadium	3,000
Gresford Athletic	Gresford	The Rock	3,500
Guilsfield	Guilsfield	Community Centre Ground	1,100
Holywell Town	Holywell	Halkyn Road	2,000
Llandudno	Llandudno	OPS Wind Arena	1,013
Llanidloes Town	Llanidloes	Victoria Park	4,000
Mold Alexandra	Mold	Alyn Park	3,000
Porthmadog	Porthmadog	Y Traeth	2,000
Prestatyn Town	Prestatyn	Bastion Road	2,500
Ruthin Town	Ruthin	Memorial Playing Fields	2,000

=== Personnel and kits ===
Team	Manager	Captain	Kit manufacturer	Shirt sponsor (chest)
Airbus UK Broughton	(Wales) Mark Allen	(Wales) Steve Tomassen	Adidas	Gardner Aerospace
Bangor 1876	(Wales) Michael Johnston	(Wales) Jamie Petrie	Joma	Watkin Property Ventures
Buckley Town	(Wales) Asa Hamilton	(Wales) Josh Jones	TAG Sportswear	Thomas Roofing
Caersws	(Wales) Luke Williams	(Wales) Harry Cottam	Macron	Gellidywyll Holiday Home Park
Chirk AAA	(Wales) Jack Ellis/ (England) Gary Jones	(Wales) Ashton Williams	Macron	Planet Vape
Denbigh Town	(Wales) Dewi Llion	(Wales) Paul Fleming	Umbro	Travelsport
Flint Town United	(Wales) Lee Fowler	(Wales) Jay Owen	Macron	Essity
Gresford Athletic	(Wales) Eddie Maurice-Jones	(Wales) Josh Griffiths	Macron	Eurogold
Guilsfield	(England) Nathan Leonard	(Wales) Jojo Harries	Macron	Hardings Garden Centre
Holywell Town	(England) Johnny Haseldin	(England) James Graham	Joma	Achieve More Training
Llandudno	(Wales) Jordan Hadaway	(Wales) Ross Weaver	Umbro	Offshore Painting Services
Llanidloes Town	(Wales) Andy Evans	(England) Ed Clarke	Errea	Hafren Furnishers
Mold Alexandra	(Wales) Mike Cunningham	(England) Rhys Nash	Joma	Vision
Porthmadog	(Wales) Craig Papirnyk	(Wales) Iddon Price	Joma	Aspects
Prestatyn Town	(England) Matty Roberts	(England) Jono Cahill	Joma	Lola's Bar
Ruthin Town	(England) Dave Evans	(Wales) Osian Davies	Macron	GJ Teeson Ltd

=== Managerial changes ===
Team	Outgoing manager	Manner of departure	Date of vacancy	Position in table	Incoming manager	Date of appointment
Buckley Town	(Wales) Dan Moore	Resigned	15 April 2023	Pre-season	(England) Jason Aldcroft	28 April 2023
Chirk AAA	(Wales) Andy Pryde	Resigned	15 April 2023	Pre-season	(Wales) Jack Ellis/ (England) Gary Jones	18 April 2023
Llanidloes Town	(Wales) Chris Davies	Resigned	25 May 2023	Pre-season	(Wales) Adam Worton/ (Wales) Dave Jarman	7 June 2023
Llanidloes Town	(Wales) Adam Worton/ (Wales) Dave Jarman	Resigned	10 June 2023	Pre-season	(England) Lawrence Wilson	23 June 2023
Llandudno	(Wales) Sean Eardley	Resigned	5 June 2023	Pre-season	(Wales) Jordan Hadaway	7 July 2023
Prestatyn Town	(England) Chris Jones	Sacked	1 October 2023	13th	(England) Karl Clair	2 October 2023
Caersws	(Wales) Mark Griffiths	Resigned	3 October 2023	10th	(Wales) Luke Williams (Note: Griffiths stepped down as joint-manager, but Williams continued in his role.)	
Buckley Town	(England) Jason Aldcroft	Resigned	10 October 2023	13th	(Wales) Asa Hamilton	13 October 2023
Llanidloes Town	(England) Lawrence Wilson	Sacked	12 October 2023	15th	(Wales) Andy Evans	2 December 2023
Prestatyn Town	(England) Karl Clair	Resigned	12 January 2024	13th	(England) Matty Roberts	12 January 2024
Ruthin Town	(England) Phil Hudson	Resigned	20 March 2024	10th	(England) Dave Evans	20 March 2024

== League table ==
Pos	Team	Pld	W	D	L	GF	GA	GD	Pts	Promotion or relegation
1	Holywell Town (Note: Holywell Town were ineligible for promotion after being refused a licence for the 2024–25 Cymru Premier.) (C)	30	26	3	1	79	17	+62	81	
2	Flint Town United (P)	30	25	3	2	94	30	+64	78	Promotion to Cymru Premier
3	Airbus UK Broughton	30	23	5	2	84	28	+56	74	
4	Mold Alexandra	30	18	1	11	66	50	+16	55	
5	Bangor 1876	30	17	2	11	62	55	+7	53	
6	Denbigh Town	30	15	4	11	71	60	+11	49	
7	Ruthin Town	30	12	6	12	58	52	+6	42	
8	Guilsfield	30	11	7	12	48	46	+2	40	
9	Caersws	30	10	9	11	60	53	+7	39	
10	Gresford Athletic	30	10	7	13	47	54	−7	37	
11	Buckley Town	30	10	6	14	54	60	−6	36	
12	Llandudno	30	10	1	19	59	80	−21	31	
13	Prestatyn Town	30	7	5	18	39	74	−35	23 (Note: Prestatyn Town were deducted three points for fielding an ineligible player against Mold Alexandra on 31 December 2023.)	
14	Porthmadog (R)	30	6	4	20	35	66	−31	22	Relegation to Ardal NE or Ardal NW
15	Chirk AAA (R)	30	3	4	23	32	82	−50	13	Relegation to Ardal NE or Ardal NW
16	Llanidloes Town (R)	30	2	3	25	25	106	−81	9	Relegation to Ardal NE or Ardal NW

Source: Cymru North
Rules for classification: 1) Points; 2) Goal difference; 3) Goals scored; 4) Matches won; 5) Play-off.
(C) Champions; (P) Promoted; (R) Relegated

== Results ==
Teams play each other twice on a home and away basis.

Home \ Away	AIR	BAN	BUC	CAE	CHI	DEN	FTU	GRE	GUI	HWL	LND	LID	MOL	POR	PRE	RUT
Airbus UK Broughton	—	4–0	2–2	3–3	3–2	3–1	3–0	0–0	3–0	1–1	2–1	2–0	5–3	2–1	6–0	2–0
Bangor 1876	1–2	—	3–0	2–0	3–2	2–1	1–4	1–3	2–1	1–4	0–3	6–0	1–0	4–1	1–4	0–0
Buckley Town	1–3	2–3	—	2–1	3–2	1–2	0–3	2–2	0–1	1–2	2–3	3–0	0–3	1–1	5–1	2–2
Caersws	3–3	2–3	2–2	—	3–2	1–1	1–2	1–1	2–3	1–2	2–1	5–0	4–0	1–2	2–1	5–1
Chirk AAA	0–5	0–1	0–1	2–2	—	0–1	1–4	0–0	2–2	0–2	3–2	2–0	1–4	1–1	0–3	1–2
Denbigh Town	2–0	2–2	6–5	4–1	6–1	—	1–2	2–5	2–2	1–5	4–1	6–2	3–2	3–1	4–3	2–1
Flint Town United	1–0	4–2	2–0	3–2	3–0	2–1	—	3–0	1–1	1–1	5–1	9–4	6–3	3–0	2–1	7–0
Gresford Athletic	0–3	1–3	2–1	1–3	6–0	1–2	2–4	—	1–1	0–5	3–1	4–1	1–5	2–3	2–2	1–2
Guilsfield	1–2	1–2	0–1	2–2	4–0	4–1	1–3	0–1	—	0–2	2–3	1–1	0–3	4–0	3–1	2–1
Holywell Town	1–2	2–1	3–0	3–1	2–1	3–0	1–0	4–1	4–2	—	2–1	4–0	3–0	1–0	4–0	1–0
Llandudno	1–5	2–4	1–5	2–3	4–1	2–2	1–5	2–3	0–2	0–4	—	6–1	1–2	3–2	3–2	2–1
Llanidloes Town	1–5	0–4	2–2	1–3	1–2	0–7	0–3	0–2	1–4	0–2	3–2	—	1–5	1–2	1–1	1–3
Mold Alexandra	0–3	3–1	1–2	2–1	5–2	2–0	0–4	1–0	3–0	1–3	1–0	4–1	—	5–1	3–0	0–3
Porthmadog	0–3	0–4	1–3	1–1	4–1	2–1	1–3	0–1	0–1	0–3	2–3	0–1	1–2	—	3–1	2–3
Prestatyn Town	0–4	3–4	4–2	0–0	2–1	0–3	0–4	1–0	1–1	0–4	2–3	1–0	1–1	3–2	—	1–2
Ruthin Town	2–3	4–0	2–3	1–2	3–2	4–0	1–1	1–1	1–2	1–1	5–4	6–1	1–2	1–1	4–0	—

Source: Cymru North Match Results
Legend: Blue = home team win; Yellow = draw; Red = away team win.
