= 2022–23 Ardal NW =

Ardal NW
- Season: 2022–23
- Champions: Denbigh Town
- Promoted: Denbigh Town; Bangor 1876
- Relegated: Rhostyllen
- Matches played: 182
- Goals scored: 714 (3.92 per match)
- Top goalscorer: 37 Goals: Corrig McGonigle (Bangor 1876)
- Biggest home win: Denbigh Town 9-1 Brickfield Rangers (13 January 2023); Denbigh Town 8-0 C.P.D. Y Felinheli (20 January 2023)
- Biggest away win: Saltney Town 0-5 Denbigh Town (12 November 2022); Llangefni Town 2-7 Bangor 1876 (9 December 2022); Hawarden Rangers 0-5 Flint Mountain (4 February 2023); Llandudno Albion 2-7 Rhostyllen (1 April 2023); Brickfield Rangers 0-5 Flint Mountain (19 April 2023)
- Highest scoring: Rhostyllen 6–6 Llay Welfare (15 April 2023)
- Highest attendance: 840 *Bangor 1876 2-1 C.P.D. Y Rhyl 1879 (8 April 2023)
- Lowest attendance: 27 *Saltney Town 0-2 Llanrwst United (15 April 2023)
- Average attendance: 100

The 2022–23 Ardal NW season (also known as the 2022–23 Lock Stock Ardal NW season for sponsorship reasons) is the second season of the new third-tier northern region football in Welsh football pyramid, part of the Ardal Leagues.

== Teams ==
The league was made up of 16 teams competing for one automatic promotion place to Cymru North, whilst the second-placed team qualified for a play-off with the second-placed team of Ardal NE. Three teams are relegated to Tier 4.

On 21 September 2022, Rhydymwyn FC notified the Football Association of Wales of their withdrawal from the Ardal Leagues. Announcing on Social Media, Rhydymwyn FC said: “Sad day today to announce Rhydymwyn FC & Rhydymwyn Development have resigned from @ArdalNorthwest and the Wales FA Reserve League. Our Juniors & mini teams will continue. Further statement from the club will be announced in due course.”

Bodedern Athletic withdrew from the Ardal Leagues on 7 December 2022. In a statement, Bodedern Athletic said: “A difficult decision has been made that Bodedern Athletic have withdrawn their membership of the Ardal North West League. After a club meeting, the small group of volunteers running the club felt they had on option but to resign. The last couple of months have been difficult in trying to field a team, as many players have departed for various reasons, and not being able to sign players because of having transfer windows in Tier 3 of Welsh football. With no help or assistance from the League there was only one outcome.”

On 24 February 2023, Llandudno Albion announced that the club will disband at the end of the current season due to the difficulty in securing a home ground. A statement on the club's Facebook page said: "After 9 years, 272 games, 862 goals, three promotions, five trophies and a FAW trophy final, this will be the last season for Llandudno Albion. As part of the tier 3 licence for next season we must have a ground share agreement in place by March 1st which is obviously not possible at Llandudno at the moment.”

=== Team changes ===
==== To Ardal NW ====
Promoted from North East Wales Football League Premier Division

- Flint Mountain
- Hawarden Rangers

Promoted from North Wales Coast East Football League Premier Division

- C.P.D. Y Rhyl 1879

Promoted from North Wales Coast West Football League Premier Division

- Bodedern Athletic
- Bangor 1876

Relegated from Cymru North

- Llangefni Town

==== From Ardal NW ====
Promoted to Cymru North

- Mold Alexandra
- Porthmadog

Relegated

- St Asaph City
- Brymbo
- Blaenau Amateurs

Transferred to Ardal NE

- Llanuwchllyn

=== Stadia and locations ===
Locations of teams in the 2022–23 Ardal NW

Team	Location	Home Ground	Capacity
Bangor 1876	Bangor	Treborth	3,400
Bodedern Athletic	Bodedern	Cae Ty Cristion	1,000
Brickfield Rangers	Wrexham	Clywedog Park	1,000
C.P.D. Y Rhyl 1879	Rhyl	Belle Vue	3,000
Denbigh Town	Denbigh	Central Park	1,200
Flint Mountain	Pentre Halkyn	Cae-y-Castell	2,000
Hawarden Rangers	Hawarden	Gladstone Playing Fields	1,000
Llandudno Albion	Llandudno	Maesdu Park	1,013
Llangefni Town	Llangefni	Cae Bob Parry	4,500
Llanrwst United	Llanrwst	Gwydyr Park	2,000
Llay Welfare	Llay	The Ring	1,000
Nantlle Vale	Penygroes	Maes Dulyn	1,000
Rhostyllen	Rhostyllen	Vicarage Hill	1,000
Rhydymwyn	Rhydmwyn	Vicarage Road	1,000
Saltney Town	Saltney	Saltney Community Centre	1,000
Y Felinheli	Y Felinheli	Cae Seilo	1,000

Source: Ardal NW Ground Information

== Personnel ==
Team	Head coach	Captain
Bangor 1876	(Wales) Michael Johnston	(Wales) Les Davies
Bodedern Athletic	(Wales) Ricky Williams	(Wales) Casey Boylan
Brickfield Rangers	(Wales) Gareth Wilson	(Wales) Chris Dixon
Denbigh Town	(Wales) Dewi Llion	(Wales) Paul Fleming
Y Felinheli	(Wales) Euron Davies	(Wales) Aled Griffith
Flint Mountain	(England) Aden Shannon	(Wales) Peter Martin
Hawarden Rangers	(Wales) Andy Butler	(England) Ellis Jones
Llandudno Albion	(Wales) Darren Jones	(Wales) Joel Lloyd
Llangefni Town	(Wales) James Saxon	(Wales) James Saxon
Llanrwst United	(Wales) Barry Owen	(Wales) Thomas Jones
Llay Welfare	(England) Mike Gadie	(Wales) Dean Bryan
Nantlle Vale	(Wales) Sion Eifion Jones	(Wales) Matthew Davies
Rhostyllen	(Wales) Warren Aykroyd-Duckett	(Wales) Steven Jones
Rhydymwyn	(England) Anthony Weaver	(Wales) Harry Massey
Y Rhyl 1879	(Wales) Gareth Thomas	(Wales) Reece Fairhurst
Saltney Town	(Wales) Andy Dutton	(Wales) Tom Wells

== League table ==
Pos	Team	Pld	W	D	L	GF	GA	GD	Pts	Promotion, qualification or relegation
1	Denbigh Town (C, P)	26	22	1	3	89	25	+64	67	Promotion to Cymru North
2	Bangor 1876 (O, P)	26	21	2	3	82	34	+48	65	Qualification for the Ardal Northern play-off
3	C.P.D. Y Rhyl 1879	26	19	2	5	63	32	+31	59	
4	Flint Mountain	26	16	4	6	60	36	+24	52	
5	Nantlle Vale	26	12	3	11	44	45	−1	39	
6	Llangefni Town	26	10	6	10	42	47	−5	36	
7	Llanrwst United	26	10	5	11	43	46	−3	35	
8	Brickfield Rangers	26	10	5	11	46	66	−20	35	
9	Llay Welfare	26	9	6	11	51	56	−5	33	
10	Saltney Town	26	7	5	14	37	51	−14	26	
11	Llandudno Albion	26	6	2	18	40	64	−24	20	Club folded
12	C.P.D. Y Felinheli	26	5	4	17	31	67	−36	19	
13	Hawarden Rangers	26	5	3	18	36	61	−25	18	
14	Rhostyllen (R)	26	3	6	17	50	84	−34	15	Relegation to Tier 4
15	Bodedern Athletic	0	0	0	0	0	0	0	0	Club withdrew
16	Rhydymwyn	0	0	0	0	0	0	0	0	Club withdrew

Source: Ardal NW
Rules for classification: 1) Points; 2) Goal difference; 3) Goals scored; 4) Matches won; 5) Play-off.
(C) Champions; (O) Play-off winners; (P) Promoted; (R) Relegated

== Results ==
Home \ Away	BAN	BOD	BRI	CPD	DEN	FLT	HAW	LDA	LGT	LRU	LYW	NTL	RHS	RHY	SAL	YFL
Bangor 1876	—		6–0	2–1	0–2	5–0	3–2	4–2	1–2	2–0	2–2	3–1	6–2	8–1	5–4	5–0
Bodedern Athletic		—					0–3		4–1							
Brickfield Rangers	0–3	1–2	—	0–2	1–3	0–5	3–2	2–3	3–2	3–3	3–1	1–2	4–2		2–2	3–2
C.P.D. Y Rhyl 1879	1–2		3–3	—	0–4	3–0	3–0	3–2	4–0	1–0	4–2	3–4	4–2		3–0	4–0
Denbigh Town	1–0	2–0	9–1	2–1	—	2–0	2–1	6–2	2–2	0–2	4–0	4–1	8–1		5–2	8–0
Flint Mountain	2–3		2–0	1–1	3–1	—	4–3	2–1	1–2	2–3	5–2	1–1	5–0		2–1	3–2
Hawarden Rangers	0–2		1–2	0–2	1–3	0–5	—	1–2	1–3	1–2	2–1	2–0	5–5	1–0	2–2	2–3
Llandudno Albion	0–2		2–3	1–5	0–2	1–2	1–2	—	2–0	1–1	2–3	0–1	2–7		2–1	1–2
Llangefni Town	2–7		0–0	1–2	0–2	0–0	2–0	1–4	—	2–1	1–1	2–3	5–2		4–3	3–1
Llanrwst United	1–3		3–3	1–3	1–3	0–1	4–3	4–0	0–2	—	0–1	3–4	3–1		0–4	3–2
Llay Welfare	1–3		3–0	0–1	4–2	1–4	4–0	3–2	3–2	3–3	—	2–3	2–2		1–0	0–1
Nantlle Vale	3–4	4–0	3–1	1–2	0–1	0–2	1–2	1–1	2–0	0–0	1–3	—	4–3		0–1	1–2
Rhostyllen	3–3		0–1	1–2	0–2	3–3	1–3	2–4	0–2	0–1	6–6	1–4	—		1–1	2–0
Rhydymwyn					1–7							2–3		—		
Saltney Town	2–4	6–2	1–3	2–3	0–5	0–3	1–0	1–0	0–0	0–2	1–0	0–1	4–1	1–1	—	2–0
Y Felinheli	0–2		1–4	1–2	2–6	1–2	0–0	3–2	2–2	1–2	2–2	1–2	0–2		2–2	—

First match(es) will be played: 27 August 2022. Source:
Legend: Blue = home team win; Yellow = draw; Red = away team win.
For upcoming matches, an "a" indicates there is an article about the rivalry between the two participants.

== Top Goalscorers - League Only ==
37 Goals: Corrig McGonigle (Bangor 1876)
19 Goals: Nathan Brown (Denbigh Town)
18 Goals: Matthew Worrall (Denbigh Town, Llay Welfare)
17 Goals: Andrew Vale (Brickfield Rangers)
16 Goals: Matty Jones (Llangefni Town)
