= 2022–23 Ardal SW =

Ardal SW
- Season: 2022–23
- Champions: Caerau (Ely)
- Promoted: Caerau (Ely); Baglan Dragons
- Relegated: Dinas Powys; Garden Village; Cwmamman United

The 2022–23 Ardal SW season (also known as the 2022–23 Floodlighting and Electrical Services Ardal SW season for sponsorship reasons) is the second season of the new third-tier southern region football in Welsh football pyramid, part of the Ardal Leagues.

== Teams ==
The league was made up of 16 teams competing for one automatic promotion place to Cymru South, whilst the second place team qualified for a play-off with the second-placed team of Ardal SE. Three teams are relegated to Tier 4.

=== Team changes ===
==== To Ardal SW ====
Promoted from South Wales Alliance League Premier Division

- Baglan Dragons
- Cefn Cribwr

Promoted from West Wales Premier League

- Mumbles Rangers
- Seven Sisters Onllwyn

Relegated from Cymru South

- Port Talbot Town

==== From Ardal SW ====
Promoted to Cymru South

- Pontardawe Town
- Ynyshir Albions

Relegated

- Ton Pentre
- West End
- AFC Porth

=== Stadia and locations ===
Locations of teams in the 2022–23 Ardal SW

Team	Location	Home Ground	Capacity
AFC Llwydcoed	Llwydcoed	Welfare Ground	1,000
Baglan Dragons	Baglan	Evans Bevan Playing Fields	1,000
Caerau (Ely)	Cardiff	Cwrt-yr-Ala	1,000
Cardiff Draconians	Cardiff	Lydstep Park	1,000
Cefn Cribwr	Clydach Vale	King George V New Field	900
Cwmamman United	Glanamman	Grenig Park	1,500
Dinas Powys	Dinas Powys	The Murch	1,500
Garden Village	Kingsbridge	Stafford Common	2,000
Mumbles Rangers	Swansea	Sketty Lane	1,500
Penrhiwceiber Rangers	Penrhiwceiber	Glasbrook Field	1,000
Penydarren BGC	Penydarren	The Bont Playing Fields	1,000
Pontyclun	Pontyclun	Ivor Park	1,000
Port Talbot Town	Port Talbot	Victoria Road	6,000
Seven Sisters Onllwyn	Neath	Welfare Ground	500
Treharris Athletic	Trelewis	Parc Taf Bargoed	1,000
Ynysygerwn	Llandarcy	Llandarcy Academy of Sport	1,000

Source: Ardal SW Ground Information

- (Cefn Cribwr are ground sharing at Cambrian & Clydach Vale, whilst Mumbles Rangers share at Swansea University)

== League table ==
Pos	Team	Pld	W	D	L	GF	GA	GD	Pts	Promotion, qualification or relegation
1	Caerau (Ely) (C, P)	30	21	3	6	78	34	+44	66	Promotion to Cymru South
2	Baglan Dragons (O, P)	30	19	7	4	78	21	+57	64	Qualification for the Ardal Southern play-off
3	Pontyclun	30	19	5	6	48	25	+23	62	
4	Penrhiwceiber Rangers	30	16	9	5	59	37	+22	57	
5	Cefn Cribwr	30	13	9	8	70	41	+29	48	
6	Penydarren BGC	30	14	6	10	71	54	+17	48	
7	Ynysygerwn	30	13	7	10	57	46	+11	46	
8	AFC Llwydcoed	30	11	5	14	60	67	−7	38	
9	Mumbles Rangers	30	10	8	12	45	63	−18	38	
10	Treharris Athletic Western	30	10	7	13	50	59	−9	37	Transferred to Ardal SE
11	Seven Sisters Onllwyn	30	11	2	17	38	72	−34	35	
12	Port Talbot Town	30	9	6	15	41	63	−22	33	
13	Cardiff Draconians	30	8	5	17	47	62	−15	29	
14	Garden Village (R)	30	8	3	19	43	76	−33	27	Relegation to Tier 4
15	Cwmamman United (R)	30	7	6	17	34	67	−33	27	Relegation to Tier 4
16	Dinas Powys (R)	30	4	6	20	34	66	−32	18	Relegation to Tier 4

Source: Ardal SW
Rules for classification: 1) Points; 2) Goal difference; 3) Goals scored; 4) Matches won; 5) Play-off.
(C) Champions; (O) Play-off winners; (P) Promoted; (R) Relegated

== Results ==
Home \ Away	LWY	BGD	CRU	CDD	CFN	CWM	DIP	GAV	MUR	PNR	PNY	PTY	PTT	SSO	TRH	YNS
AFC Llwydcoed	—	0–5	4–4	3–1	1–2	2–1	0–4	1–1	8–1	3–3	2–0	2–3	0–1	1–2	6–0	1–1
Baglan Dragons	4–0	—	0–2	3–0	2–0	6–0	5–0	2–0	3–0	1–0	3–0	2–0	4–0	8–0	2–1	4–0
Caerau (Ely)	3–2	2–0	—	2–0	3–1	3–1	6–1	5–1	3–4	4–2	1–0	0–1	4–0	6–0	3–1	2–3
Cardiff Draconians	1–1	4–2	0–2	—	2–2	3–0	3–2	2–1	0–2	1–2	1–5	1–3	3–1	3–3	3–4	2–3
Cefn Cribwr	6–3	1–1	1–3	3–1	—	4–1	8–0	8–0	1–1	2–2	2–2	3–0	3–2	1–0	6–1	1–1
Cwmamman United	2–1	1–1	0–1	1–0	0–4	—	0–2	0–2	2–1	0–2	2–1	0–1	1–2	3–1	1–3	0–0
Dinas Powys	0–2	1–4	0–3	0–3	0–1	2–2	—	8–0	1–2	1–3	0–0	0–0	1–2	1–2	0–1	0–2
Garden Village	1–2	1–1	2–3	1–3	3–2	0–1	3–4	—	1–5	2–1	2–1	1–2	2–1	4–0	3–1	0–2
Mumbles Rangers	1–2	0–3	2–1	3–2	1–1	2–2	1–1	3–2	—	1–5	0–1	2–1	1–1	1–4	2–2	1–3
Penrhiwceiber Rangers	3–1	0–0	0–3	3–2	0–0	2–2	2–0	2–1	1–1	—	3–1	2–0	2–0	1–2	1–1	3–0
Penydarren BGC	6–0	2–5	3–3	2–0	3–3	6–1	2–1	3–2	1–1	4–4	—	0–1	4–0	8–2	5–4	3–2
Pontyclun	2–0	2–0	0–0	1–0	1–0	2–3	1–1	4–1	2–0	0–2	3–0	—	3–0	2–0	1–1	2–1
Port Talbot Town	4–5	1–1	3–2	1–1	3–1	5–5	2–1	1–0	1–2	0–2	1–2	2–4	—	1–1	2–0	1–1
Seven Sisters Onllwyn	0–3	0–3	0–2	4–2	2–0	2–0	2–0	3–0	3–2	1–2	1–2	0–3	0–1	—	1–3	0–4
Treharris Athletic	3–1	1–1	0–1	1–2	2–1	3–0	1–1	2–3	1–2	2–2	2–1	1–1	3–1	4–0	—	1–3
Ynysygerwn	2–3	2–2	2–1	1–1	0–2	3–2	3–1	3–3	4–0	1–2	2–3	0–2	4–1	1–2	3–0	—

First match(es) will be played: 6 August 2022. Source:
Legend: Blue = home team win; Yellow = draw; Red = away team win.
For upcoming matches, an "a" indicates there is an article about the rivalry between the two participants.
