= Baglan Dragons F.C. =

Association football club in Wales

Coordinates: 51°37′0.7″N 3°48′38.3″W

Baglan Dragons
- Full name: Baglan Dragons Football Club
- Founded: 1950
- Ground: Evans Bevan Playing Fields
- League: Cymru South
- 2025–26: Cymru South, 14th of 16

Baglan Dragons Football Club is a Welsh football team based in Baglan, Port Talbot, Wales. They play in the Cymru South.

== History ==
The club was formed in 1950 as Red Dragon & Baglan.

By the late 1990s they were playing in the South Wales Amateur League, and were Division Two champions in the 2002–03 season. In 2004 the club changed its name to Baglan Red Dragons and 2009 changed to Baglan Dragons. The club were relegated from Division One at the end of the 2010–11 season, but regained their place in Division One at the end of the following season after a third-place finish in Division Two.

In 2015–16 the club joined the South Wales Alliance League Division One in its inaugural season and obtained promotion in the first season, finishing as runners-up. The club continued to play in the South Wales Alliance League Premier Division until they won the division in 2021–22, earning promotion to the Ardal SW. In that season they also reached the final of the FAW Trophy, finishing runners-up to Mold Alexandra. In the club's one and only season in the third tier, they secured a second-place finish and qualified for the Ardal Southern Play-off. They won this game 2–0 against Risca United and gained promotion to the Cymru South for the first time in their history. In their first season they finished 10th in the league. In the following season, the club improved on their previous season by 2 places to finish 8th in the league. In the 2025–26 season they fell to 14th.

== Honours ==
- Ardal SW League – Runners-up: 2022–23
- Ardal Southern Play-off – Winners: 2022–23
- South Wales Alliance League Premier Division: – Champions: 2021–22
- South Wales Alliance League Division One: – Runners-up: 2015–16
- South Wales Amateur League Division Two: – Champions: 2002–03
- FAW Trophy – Runners-up: 2021–22
