= 2023–24 Cymru South =

Fourth season of the second-tier Southern Welsh football

Cymru South
- Season: 2023–24
- Champions: Briton Ferry Llansawel
- Promoted: Briton Ferry Llansawel
- Relegated: Abergavenny Town; Abertillery Bluebirds; Pontardawe Town
- Top goalscorer: Alex Bonthron (30 goals)
- Biggest home win: Llanelli 9-0 Abertillery Bluebirds; 20 October 2023)
- Biggest away win: Abertillery Bluebirds 0-7 Ammanford; 20 October 2023)
- Highest scoring: Pontardawe Town 3-6 Caerau Ely; 27 January 2024)
- Longest winning run: Briton Ferry (7 games)
- Longest unbeaten run: Briton Ferry/Llanelli (9 games)
- Longest winless run: Abergavenny Town (13 games)
- Longest losing run: Abergavenny Town (11 games)
- Highest attendance: 1,201 - Briton Ferry vs Ammanford (9 April 2024)

The 2023–24 Cymru South season (also known as the 2023–24 JD Cymru South season for sponsorship reasons) was the fourth season of the second-tier Southern region football in Welsh football pyramid.

The winners (Briton Ferry Llansawel) were promoted to the 2024–25 Cymru Premier. The bottom three teams (Abergavenny Town, Abertillery Bluebirds, and Pontardawe Town) were relegated to either the 2024–25 Ardal SE or 2024–25 Ardal SW.

== Teams ==
The league consisted of 16 clubs; 13 clubs remaining from the previous season, and 3 clubs promoted from the Ardal Southern Leagues.

The champions of the Ardal SE and Ardal SW leagues from 2022 to 2023, Caerau (Ely) and Abertillery Bluebirds respectively, were both promoted after achieving the necessary license. After defeating Risca United in the play-off final, Baglan Dragons were promoted, securing their second consecutive promotion. They replaced the promoted Cymru South team of Barry Town United, and relegated Cymru South teams of Swansea University and Ynyshir Albions.

As both teams relegated from the 2022–23 Cymru Premier were based in the North, no teams were relegated into the Cymru South. Instead, Trefelin BGC were given a reprieve from relegation.

=== Stadia and Locations ===
Locations of the 2023–24 Cymru South teams

Team	Home City	Home Ground	Capacity
Abergavenny Town	Abergavenny	Pen-y-Pound Stadium	1,500
Abertillery Bluebirds	Abertillery	Cwm Nant-Y-Groes	1,000
Afan Lido	Aberavon, Port Talbot	Marston's Stadium	3,000
Ammanford	Ammanford	Recreation Ground	1,000
Baglan Dragons	Baglan, Port Talbot	Evans Bevan Playing Field	1,000
Briton Ferry Llansawel	Briton Ferry	Old Road	1,000
Cambrian & Clydach Vale BGC	Clydach Vale	King George V New Field	900
Caerau (Ely)	Ely, Cardiff	Cwrt-yr-Ala Road	1,000
Carmarthen Town	Carmarthen	Richmond Park	2,500
Cwmbran Celtic	Cwmbran	Celtic Park	350
Goytre United	Goytre, Port Talbot	Glenhafod Park Stadium	1,500
Llanelli Town	Llanelli	Stebonheath Park	3,700
Llantwit Major F.C.	Llantwit Major	Windmill Ground	1,000
Pontardawe Town	Pontardawe	Parc Ynysderw	1,000
Taff's Well A.F.C.	Taff's Well	Rhiw'r Ddar	2,930
Trefelin BGC	Velindre, Port Talbot	Ynys Park	1,000

== Personnel and kits ==
Team	Head coach	Captain	Kit manufacturer	Front shirt sponsor
Abergavenny Town	(Wales) Darren Brown	(Wales) Rhys Schwank	Joma	Trade Centre Wales
Abertillery Bluebirds	(Wales) Josh Anderson	(Wales) Richard Crees	Joma	Ensinger
Afan Lido	(Wales) Paul Evans	(Wales) Liam Griffiths	Macron	
Ammanford	(Wales) Gruff Harrison	(Wales) Luke Harris	Joma	Morganstone
Baglan Dragons	(Wales) Carl Clement	(Wales) Lewis Holmes	Joma	Pinetree Car Superstore
Briton Ferry Llansawel	(Wales) Andy Dyer	(Wales) Alex Gammond	Macron	
Cambrian & Clydach Vale BGC	(Wales) Richie Ryan	(Wales) Ceri Morgan	Joma	Pinetree Car Superstore
Caerau (Ely)	(Wales) Dean Wheeler	(Wales) Jack Ashford	Classic Sportswear	Mr Homes
Carmarthen Town	(Wales) Mark Aizlewood	(Wales) Greg Walters	Kappa	A.T.B. Davies & Son
Cwmbran Celtic	(Wales) James Kinsella	(Wales) Andrew Larcombe	Hummel	Avondale Motor Park
Goytre United	(Wales) Laurie Marsh	(Wales) Jordan Edwards	Joma	CXJ Building Sponsors
Llanelli Town	(Wales) Lee John	(Wales) Josef Hopkins	Joma	First Choice Flooring Wales
Llantwit Major	(Wales) Ben Stait	(Wales) Ioan Emanuel	Tor Sports	
Pontardawe Town	(Wales) Garry Taylor	(Wales) Craig Davies	Ffigar	
Taff's Well	(Wales) Geza Hajgato/ (Wales) Nathan Cotterall	(United States) Vaughn Fowler	Macron	Gentles Construction
Trefelin BGC	(Wales) Andy Hill	(Wales) Ceri Williams	Macron	

=== Managerial changes ===
Team	Outgoing manager	Manner of departure	Date of vacancy	Position in table	Incoming manager	Date of appointment
Taff's Well	(Wales) Craig Sampson	Resigned	17 May 2023	Pre-season	(Wales) Geza Hajgato/ (Wales) Nathan Cotterall	17 May 2023
Abergavenny Town	(Wales) Nicky Morgan	Resigned	14 August 2023	15th	(Wales) Danny Elliott	15 August 2023
Llantwit Major	(Wales) Stevie McCarthy-Campbell	Sacked	18 August 2023	10th	(Wales) Ben Stait	28 August 2023
Goytre United	(Wales) Karl Lewis	Resigned	16 September 2023	10th	(Wales) Laurie Marsh	13 October 2023
Briton Ferry Llansawel	(Wales) Andy Hill	Sacked	24 September 2023	3rd	(Wales) Andy Dyer	26 October 2023
Trefelin BGC	(Wales) Mike Waters	Mutual consent	11 October 2023	12th	(Wales) Andy Hill	19 October 2023
Cambrian & Clydach Vale BGC	(Wales) Richard Ryan	Mutual consent	11 October 2023	8th	(Wales) Gareth Evans	15 November 2023
Abertillery Bluebirds	(Wales) Ben Murphy	Resigned	7 December 2023	15th	(Wales) Josh Anderson	8 December 2023
Abergavenny Town	(Wales) Danny Elliott	Resigned	26 February 2024	16th	(Wales) Darren Brown	26 February 2024

== League table ==
Pos	Team	Pld	W	D	L	GF	GA	GD	Pts	Promotion or relegation
1	Briton Ferry Llansawel (C, P)	30	23	2	5	87	39	+48	71	Promotion to Cymru Premier
2	Llanelli Town	30	20	4	6	80	40	+40	64	
3	Ammanford	30	17	6	7	60	42	+18	57	
4	Cambrian & Clydach Vale BGC	30	14	8	8	60	37	+23	50	
5	Caerau (Ely)	30	15	4	11	72	60	+12	49	
6	Carmarthen Town	30	12	11	7	50	39	+11	47	
7	Afan Lido	30	14	4	12	68	56	+12	46	
8	Goytre United	30	12	7	11	58	59	−1	43	
9	Cwmbran Celtic	30	12	6	12	69	64	+5	42	
10	Baglan Dragons	30	11	8	11	46	41	+5	41	
11	Trefelin BGC	30	10	8	12	47	63	−16	38	
12	Llantwit Major	30	9	8	13	44	54	−10	35	
13	Taff's Well	30	8	8	14	44	49	−5	32	
14	Pontardawe Town (R)	30	8	8	14	52	70	−18	32	Relegation to Ardal SE or Ardal SW
15	Abertillery Bluebirds (R)	30	3	6	21	34	94	−60	15	Relegation to Ardal SE or Ardal SW
16	Abergavenny Town (R)	30	2	2	26	20	84	−64	8	Relegation to Ardal SE or Ardal SW

Source: Cymru South
Rules for classification: 1) Points; 2) Goal difference; 3) Goals scored; 4) Matches won; 5) Play-off.
(C) Champions; (P) Promoted; (R) Relegated

== Results ==
Teams play each other twice on a home and away basis.

Home \ Away	ABT	ATB	AFL	AMM	BGD	BFL	CRU	CCV	CAR	CBC	GOU	LLI	LTM	PNT	TAW	TRE
Abergavenny Town	—	3–1	1–2	0–1	2–3	0–3	1–3	0–2	0–2	2–1	1–1	1–5	0–1	1–2	2–4	0–2
Abertillery Bluebirds	1–1	—	2–5	0–7	0–3	0–3	3–5	0–2	2–0	1–4	0–4	1–1	1–0	2–2	1–1	2–5
Afan Lido	6–0	3–0	—	4–2	0–2	3–2	3–1	2–5	4–1	2–1	1–2	0–3	4–1	2–3	2–2	5–2
Ammanford	3–1	3–2	2–4	—	2–2	2–1	1–1	3–1	2–2	4–3	0–1	1–3	0–1	2–1	1–0	1–1
Baglan Dragons	2–0	1–1	0–1	1–3	—	1–2	2–0	0–2	2–2	3–3	2–1	1–2	0–0	1–2	1–0	4–1
Briton Ferry Llansawel	3–0	2–1	2–1	4–0	2–0	—	5–3	3–4	3–1	3–2	3–2	2–0	5–0	4–1	1–0	5–0
Caerau (Ely)	4–0	6–1	3–2	1–2	3–0	2–2	—	1–3	2–4	4–2	3–0	1–2	3–2	3–1	1–0	2–0
Cambrian & Clydach Vale BGC	6–0	5–2	1–1	0–0	2–0	3–2	2–2	—	0–1	2–3	1–1	1–1	1–2	0–2	1–1	0–0
Carmarthen Town	4–1	1–0	3–3	0–1	0–0	2–2	1–1	2–0	—	3–0	2–2	0–1	0–3	1–1	2–0	6–1
Cwmbran Celtic	6–0	1–2	2–0	2–1	1–1	2–4	3–2	3–4	0–1	—	3–1	3–1	2–1	4–4	1–1	4–1
Goytre United	3–2	4–2	1–1	2–6	3–2	2–3	6–2	1–0	0–1	2–3	—	2–1	2–2	4–1	1–3	0–3
Llanelli Town	4–0	9–0	3–2	1–2	2–1	2–5	4–0	2–1	4–3	3–2	4–1	—	2–1	5–0	3–1	1–2
Llantwit Major	4–0	3–2	1–0	0–0	1–4	3–1	1–4	2–2	1–2	1–1	0–1	2–5	—	0–0	1–3	3–1
Pontardawe Town	1–0	2–2	2–3	1–3	1–2	2–4	3–6	0–3	1–1	3–3	4–4	1–3	3–2	—	1–3	0–1
Taff's Well	3–1	2–1	4–1	1–3	1–4	0–3	1–2	0–2	1–1	6–2	1–2	1–1	2–2	0–2	—	1–2
Trefelin BGC	1–0	6–1	2–1	1–2	1–1	0–3	3–1	0–4	1–1	1–2	2–2	2–2	3–3	1–5	1–1	—

Source: Cymru South Match Results
Legend: Blue = home team win; Yellow = draw; Red = away team win.

== Season statistics ==
As of 19 May 2024

=== Top scorers ===
Rank	Player	Club	Goals
1	(Wales) Alex Bonthron	Cwmbran Celtic	30
2	(Wales) Luke Bowen	Briton Ferry Llansawel	29
3	(Wales) Lewis Reed	Ammanford	25
4	(Wales) Keane Watts	Goytre United	19
5	(Wales) Roan Piper	Trefelin	18

=== Monthly awards ===
Month	Manager of the Month		Player of the Month	
Month	Manager	Club	Player	Club
August	Carl Clement	Baglan Dragons	Sean Cronin	Llanelli
September	Dean Wheeler	Caerau Ely	Ryan Bevan	Llanelli
October	Lee John	Llanelli	Luke Bowen	Briton Ferry Llansawel
November	Nathan Cotterrall/Geza Hajgato	Taffs Well	Ethan Cann	Llanelli
December	Mark Aizlewood	Carmarthen Town	Alex Bonthron	Cwmbran Celtic
January	Ben Stait	Llantwit Major	Joel Woodington	Llantwit Major
February	Gruff Harrison	Ammanford	Lewis Reed	Ammanford
March	Andy Dyer	Briton Ferry Llansawel	Joe Hopkins	Llanelli
April	James Kinsella	Cwmbran Celtic	Luke Bowen	Briton Ferry Llansawel
