= 2022–23 Ardal NE =

Ardal NE
- Season: 2022–23
- Champions: Caersws
- Promoted: Caersws
- Relegated: Rhayader Town; Corwen

The 2022–23 Ardal NE season (also known as the 2022–23 Lock Stock Ardal NE season for sponsorship reasons) is the second season of the new third-tier northern region football in Welsh football pyramid, part of the Ardal Leagues.

== Teams ==
The league was made up of 16 teams competing for one automatic promotion place to Cymru North, whilst the second-placed team qualified for a play-off with the second-placed team of Ardal NW. The bottom three teams are relegated to Tier 4.

Machynlleth have notified the Football Association of Wales of their withdrawal from the Ardal Leagues. Notifying the league, Machynlleth said: “This decision has come about due to lack of players and commitment".

The FAW’s National Game Board (NGB) met on Tuesday, July 5 to discuss who will replace Machynlleth after their late exit. It was opted to promote the Denbighshire based team of Llangollen Town out of the options available.

On 19 July 2022, the league suffered another blow after Berriew became the latest club to withdraw from the North East division. Explaining their decision, they released a statement that read: “The Club has lost a significant number of senior players during the close season and have not been able to replace them."

No team replaced Berriew, as the season was due to start so soon, and the league was played with 15 teams.

=== Team changes ===
==== To Ardal NE ====
Promoted from Mid Wales Football League East Division

- Builth Wells

Promoted from North East Wales Premier Division

- Llangollen Town

Relegated from Cymru North

- Llanrhaeadr

Transferred from Ardal NW

- Llanuwchllyn

Transferred from Ardal SE

- Llandrindod Wells
- Rhayader Town

==== From Ardal NE ====
Promoted to Cymru North

- Chirk AAA

Relegated

- Carno
- Kerry
- Four Crosses

Withdrew from the league

- Penparcau
- Machynlleth
- Berriew

=== Stadia and locations ===
Locations of teams in the 2022–23 Ardal NE

| Team | Location | Home Ground | Capacity |
|---|---|---|---|
| Bow Street | Rhydypennau | Cae Piod | 1,000 |
| Builth Wells | Builth Wells | Lant Fields | 1,000 |
| Caersws | Caersws | Recreation Ground | 3,500 |
| Cefn Albion | Rhosymedre | The Rock | 3,000 |
| Corwen | Corwen | War Memorial Park | 1,000 |
| Dolgellau Athletic | Dolgellau | Cae Marian | 2,000 |
| Llandrindod Wells | Llandrindod Wells | Lant Avenue Broadway | 1,000 |
| Llanfair United | Llanfair Caereinion | Mount Field | 2,000 |
| Llangollen Town | Llangollen | Tower Fields | 1,100 |
| Llanrhaeadr | Llanrhaeadr-ym-Mochnant | The Recreation Field | 1,000 |
| Llanuwchllyn | Bala | Maes Tegid | 3,000 |
| Penycae | Pen-y-cae | The SoccerMillion Riverside Arena | 2,000 |
| Rhayader Town | Rhayader | The Weirglodd | 2,200 |
| Rhos Aelwyd | Rhosllanerchrugog | Ponciau Park | 1,000 |
| Welshpool Town | Welshpool | Maes y Dre | 3,000 |

Source: Ardal NE Ground Information

== Personnel ==
| Team | Head coach | Captain |
|---|---|---|
| Bow Street | (Wales) Llyr Hughes | (Wales) Steffan Richards |
| Builth Wells | (Wales) Stuart Turpin | (Wales) Chris Roff |
| Caersws | (England) Mark Griffiths | (Wales) Matthew Mumford |
| Cefn Albion | (Wales) Ian Andrews | (Wales) Nathan Williams |
| Corwen | (Republic of Ireland) Ben Heath | (Wales) Scott Evans |
| Dolgellau | (Wales) Owain Williams | (Wales) Jonathan Sutton |
| Llandrindod Wells | (Wales) Gareth Jones | (Wales) Shaun Nicholls |
| Llanfair United | (England) Lawrence WIlson | (Wales) Ben Jones |
| Llangollen | (Wales) Luke Maybury | (Wales) Kristian Jones |
| Llanrheadr | (Wales) Mike Barton | (Wales) Joe Vaughan |
| Llanuwchllyn | (Wales) Sion Tudor | (Wales) Iolo Jones |
| Penycae | (England) Daniel Richards | (Wales) Adam Peters |
| Rhayader | (Wales) Dai Davies | (Wales) Joe Wozencraft |
| Rhos Aelwyd | (Wales) Aled Parry | (Wales) Aled Robertson |
| Welshpool Town | (Wales) Russell Cadwallader | (England) Ricky Litchfield |

== League table ==
| Pos | Team | Pld | W | D | L | GF | GA | GD | Pts | Promotion, qualification or relegation |
|---|---|---|---|---|---|---|---|---|---|---|
| 1 | Caersws (C, P) | 28 | 22 | 3 | 3 | 89 | 26 | +63 | 69 | Promotion to Cymru North |
| 2 | Cefn Albion | 28 | 18 | 6 | 4 | 74 | 22 | +52 | 60 | Qualification for the Ardal Northern play-off |
| 3 | Bow Street | 28 | 17 | 6 | 5 | 66 | 26 | +40 | 57 | |
| 4 | Llanuwchllyn | 28 | 16 | 2 | 10 | 63 | 38 | +25 | 50 | |
| 5 | Llanfair United | 28 | 14 | 3 | 11 | 51 | 49 | +2 | 45 | |
| 6 | Rhos Aelwyd | 28 | 11 | 8 | 9 | 44 | 38 | +6 | 41 | |
| 7 | Llandrindod Wells | 28 | 12 | 4 | 12 | 55 | 58 | −3 | 40 | |
| 8 | Builth Wells | 28 | 11 | 6 | 11 | 51 | 54 | −3 | 39 | |
| 9 | Llanrhaeadr | 28 | 11 | 4 | 13 | 54 | 63 | −9 | 37 | |
| 10 | Welshpool Town | 28 | 10 | 3 | 15 | 54 | 67 | −13 | 33 | |
| 11 | Penycae | 28 | 9 | 6 | 13 | 48 | 64 | −16 | 33 | |
| 12 | Dolgellau Athletic | 28 | 9 | 3 | 16 | 38 | 59 | −21 | 30 | |
| 13 | Llangollen Town | 28 | 6 | 8 | 14 | 36 | 62 | −26 | 26 | |
| 14 | Corwen (R) | 28 | 4 | 7 | 17 | 34 | 80 | −46 | 19 | Relegation to Tier 4 |
| 15 | Rhayader Town (R) | 28 | 4 | 3 | 21 | 23 | 74 | −51 | 12 (Note: Rhyader Town were deducted three points for fielding an ineligible player.) | Relegation to Tier 4 |

Source: Ardal NE
Rules for classification: 1) Points; 2) Goal difference; 3) Goals scored; 4) Matches won; 5) Play-off.
(C) Champions; (P) Promoted; (R) Relegated

== Results ==
| Home \ Away | BOW | BUI | CAE | CFN | COR | DOL | LDW | LFU | LGN | LRH | LNW | PYC | RHY | RHO | WEL |
|---|---|---|---|---|---|---|---|---|---|---|---|---|---|---|---|
| Bow Street | — | 3–2 | 2–3 | 2–2 | 2–2 | 3–0 | 2–0 | 6–0 | 1–1 | 4–3 | 1–1 | 3–1 | 4–0 | 4–0 | 3–0 |
| Builth Wells | 2–0 | — | 2–0 | 1–1 | 2–4 | | 1–1 | 3–1 | 4–2 | 1–2 | 2–2 | 2–3 | 3–1 | 1–4 | 3–1 |
| Caersws | 0–0 | 6–0 | — | 1–1 | 7–0 | 5–1 | 3–0 | 2–1 | 2–0 | 3–0 | 3–0 | 2–1 | 2–1 | 3–0 | 5–2 |
| Cefn Albion | 1–2 | 2–0 | 2–3 | — | 5–0 | 5–0 | 3–1 | 6–1 | 7–1 | 3–0 | 1–0 | 2–2 | 1–0 | 3–0 | 5–0 |
| Corwen | 1–2 | 0–0 | 1–5 | 0–3 | — | 1–1 | 0–7 | 1–5 | 3–2 | 2–4 | 0–3 | 1–2 | 4–0 | 2–2 | 0–4 |
| Dolgellau Athletic | 0–4 | 0–2 | 3–4 | 0–3 | 3–0 | — | 3–1 | 0–2 | 2–3 | 3–2 | | 5–2 | 1–0 | 1–0 | 3–0 |
| Llandrindod Wells | 0–4 | 1–1 | 1–5 | 2–1 | 1–4 | 1–0 | — | 2–3 | 2–1 | 2–2 | 0–1 | 3–1 | 5–0 | 2–1 | 2–1 |
| Llanfair United | 1–0 | 0–3 | 2–0 | 2–1 | 1–0 | 4–1 | 0–3 | — | 1–1 | 2–0 | 0–3 | 2–2 | 4–0 | 0–0 | 6–2 |
| Llangollen Town | 0–0 | 0–0 | 0–5 | 0–2 | 3–3 | 2–5 | 4–3 | 0–3 | — | 2–1 | 2–4 | 1–0 | 0–0 | 1–2 | 2–4 |
| Llanrhaeadr | 0–4 | 1–4 | 0–6 | 2–2 | 4–1 | 1–0 | 4–2 | 4–3 | 1–3 | — | 0–4 | 3–0 | 10–3 | 0–0 | 2–2 |
| Llanuwchllyn | 1–2 | 5–3 | 1–4 | 0–3 | 5–1 | 2–0 | 3–4 | 1–4 | 0–1 | 0–1 | — | 4–1 | 5–0 | 1–0 | 2–1 |
| Penycae | 0–3 | 3–2 | 1–4 | 1–1 | 1–1 | 1–2 | 4–1 | 3–1 | 1–1 | 3–1 | 0–5 | — | 4–1 | 2–2 | 4–6 |
| Rhayader Town | 3–1 | 1–3 | 0–3 | 0–5 | 3–0 | 2–2 | 1–2 | 1–2 | 1–0 | 2–1 | 1–3 | 0–1 | — | 1–1 | 0–1 |
| Rhos Aelwyd | 0–3 | 7–1 | 2–1 | 0–1 | 1–1 | 1–1 | | 2–0 | 3–1 | 1–2 | 1–0 | 4–0 | 3–1 | — | 3–2 |
| Welshpool Town | 2–1 | 3–0 | 2–2 | 1–2 | 2–1 | 3–1 | 3–4 | 2–0 | 2–2 | 1–3 | 2–5 | 1–4 | 3–0 | 1–2 | — |

First match(es) will be played: 6 August 2022. Source:
Legend: Blue = home team win; Yellow = draw; Red = away team win.
For upcoming matches, an "a" indicates there is an article about the rivalry between the two participants.

== Top Goalscorers - League Only ==
As at 16 May 2023
20 Goals: Glunn Coney (Caersws)
18 Goals: Jack Evans (Llandrindod Wells)
15 Goals: Ben Wilson (Llangollen Town)
15 Goals: Callum Mannion (Cefn Albion)
14 Goals: Ryan Knott (Welshpool Town)
