= 2022–23 Cymru North =

Welsh football League pyramid season

Cymru North
- Season: 2022–23
- Champions: Colwyn Bay
- Promoted: Colwyn Bay
- Relegated: Holyhead Hotspur; Penrhyncoch; Conwy Borough
- Top goalscorer: Dan Atkins Prestatyn Town - 22
- Biggest home win: Prestatyn Town 8-0 Cefn Druids
- Biggest away win: Cefn Druids 1-7 Colwyn Bay
- Highest attendance: 1,585 - Llandudno vs Colwyn Bay (29 July 2022)

The 2022–23 Cymru North season (also known as the 2022–23 JD Cymru North season for sponsorship reasons) was the fourth season of the second-tier Northern region football in the Welsh football pyramid. Teams played each other twice on a home and away basis.

== Teams ==
The league consisted of 16 clubs.

=== Team changes ===
==== To Cymru North ====
Promoted from Ardal NE

- Chirk AAA

Promoted from Ardal NW

- Mold Alexandra
- Porthmadog

Relegated from Cymru Premier

- Cefn Druids

==== From Cymru North ====
Promoted to Cymru Premier

- Airbus UK Broughton

Relegated to Ardal NE

- Llanrhaeadr

Relegated to Ardal NW

- Llangefni Town

Resigned from the league

- Bangor City

=== Stadia and locations ===
Locations of teams in the 2022–23 Cymru North

Team	Home City	Home Ground	Capacity
Buckley Town	Buckley	The Globe	1,000
Cefn Druids	Rhosymedre	The Rock	3,500
Chirk AAA	Chirk	Holyhead Road	1,000
Colwyn Bay	Old Colwyn	4 Crosses Construction Arena	2,509
Conwy Borough	Conwy	Y Morfa Stadium	2,500
Gresford Athletic	Gresford	Clappers Lane	2,000
Guilsfield	Guilsfield	Community Centre Ground	1,100
Holyhead Hotspur	Holyhead	The New Oval	2,000
Holywell Town	Holywell	Halkyn Road	2,000
Llandudno	Llandudno	OPS Wind Arena	1,013
Llanidloes Town	Llanidloes	Victoria Park	4,000
Mold Alexandra	Mold	Alyn Park	3,000
Penrhyncoch	Penrhyn-coch	Cae Baker	800
Porthmadog	Porthmadog	Y Traeth	2,000
Prestatyn Town	Prestatyn	Bastion Road	2,500
Ruthin Town	Ruthin	Memorial Playing Fields	2,000

=== Personnel and kits ===
Team	Manager	Captain	Kit manufacturer	Shirt sponsor (chest)
Buckley Town	(Wales) Dan Moore	(Wales) Joshua Jones	TAG Sportswear	Thomas Roofing
Cefn Druids	(England) Neil Ashton	(England) Michael Jones	Macron	Global Travel Worldwide
Chirk AAA	(Wales) Andy Pryde	(Wales) Ashton Williams	Macron	Planet Vape
Colwyn Bay	(Wales) Steve Evans	(England) Tom McCready	Hope & Glory Sportswear	GO2 People
Conwy Borough	(England) Stu Howson	(Wales) Iolo Hughes	SKkits	Mel Owen Electrical Solutions
Gresford Athletic	(Wales) Eddie Maurice-Jones	(Wales) Joshua Griffiths	Macron	Eurogold
Guilsfield	(England) Nathan Leonard	(Wales) Sam Litchfield	Macron	Hardings Garden Centre
Holyhead Hotspur	(Wales) Darren Garney	(Wales) Alex Jones	Joma	C.L. Jones
Holywell Town	(England) Johnny Haseldin	(England) James Graham	Joma	Achieve More Training
Llandudno	(Wales) Sean Eardley	(Wales) Danny Hughes	Umbro	Offshore Painting Services
Llanidloes Town	(Wales) Chris Davies	(England) Ed Clarke	Errea	Hafren Furnishers
Mold Alexandra	(Wales) Mike Cunningham	(England) Rhys Nash	Joma	Vision
Penrhyncoch	(Wales) Gari Lewis	(Wales) Owain James	Joma	Sterling Asset Management
Porthmadog	(Wales) Craig Papirnyk	(Wales) Iddon Price	Joma	Aspects
Prestatyn Town	(England) Chris Jones	(England) Kyle Parle	Joma	Lola's Bar
Ruthin Town	(England) Phil Hudson	(Wales) Osian Davies	Macron	GJ Teeson Ltd

=== Managerial changes ===
Team	Outgoing manager	Manner of departure	Date of vacancy	Position in table	Incoming manager	Date of appointment
Penrhyncoch	(Wales) Aneurin Thomas	Resigned	24 April 2022	Pre-season	(Wales) Gari Lewis	20 June 2022
Cefn Druids	(Republic of Ireland) Andy Turner	End of interim spell	28 April 2022	Pre-season	(England) Neil Ashton	28 April 2022
Prestatyn Town	(England) John Barnes	Resigned	8 May 2022	Pre-season	(England) Chris Jones	25 May 2022
Conwy Borough	(England) Stuart Howson	Sacked	20 September 2022	16th	(Wales) Anthony Weaver	23 September 2022

== League table ==
Pos	Team	Pld	W	D	L	GF	GA	GD	Pts	Promotion or relegation
1	Colwyn Bay (C, P)	30	27	2	1	101	24	+77	83	Promotion to Cymru Premier
2	Holywell Town	30	26	1	3	75	22	+53	79	
3	Llandudno	30	20	6	4	70	23	+47	66	
4	Guilsfield	30	17	6	7	58	37	+21	57	
5	Ruthin Town	30	16	3	11	48	44	+4	51	
6	Prestatyn Town	30	14	4	12	66	50	+16	46	
7	Cefn Druids	30	13	4	13	48	64	−16	43	
8	Buckley Town	30	12	6	12	53	61	−8	42	
9	Mold Alexandra	30	10	5	15	41	52	−11	35	
10	Gresford Athletic	30	10	5	15	32	43	−11	35	
11	Porthmadog	30	10	3	17	36	53	−17	33	
12	Llanidloes Town	30	7	6	17	42	63	−21	27	
13	Chirk AAA	30	5	11	14	32	49	−17	26	
14	Conwy Borough (R)	30	5	8	17	33	64	−31	23	Relegation to Ardal NE or Ardal NW
15	Penrhyncoch (R)	30	3	7	20	31	72	−41	16	Relegation to Ardal NE or Ardal NW
16	Holyhead Hotspur (R)	30	2	9	19	24	69	−45	15	Relegation to Ardal NE or Ardal NW

Source: Cymru North
Rules for classification: 1) Points; 2) Goal difference; 3) Goals scored; 4) Matches won; 5) Play-off.
(C) Champions; (P) Promoted; (R) Relegated

== Results ==
Home \ Away	BUC	CDR	CHI	COL	CON	GRE	GUI	HDH	HWL	LND	LID	MOL	PEN	POR	PRE	RUT
Buckley Town	—	5–0	1–0	1–4	2–2	3–2	0–1	2–2	0–2	1–0	4–3	2–1	2–1	3–1	3–3	2–1
Cefn Druids	3–1	—	6–1	1–7	3–0	0–1	0–2	2–0	0–3	1–1	3–2	2–1	4–1	1–3	1–2	1–2
Chirk AAA	2–2	0–0	—	1–2	1–1	0–0	1–1	0–0	0–2	1–6	0–3	3–1	0–0	2–1	2–1	1–2
Colwyn Bay	5–2	4–1	2–0	—	5–0	2–0	6–0	4–0	1–3	1–1	4–2	4–0	3–0	2–0	2–1	4–1
Conwy Borough	1–1	1–1	1–1	0–3	—	1–3	0–3	2–1	1–4	1–2	0–0	0–1	3–1	0–2	2–3	0–1
Gresford Athletic	0–3	2–1	2–2	0–2	0–1	—	0–0	1–3	1–2	1–4	2–0	0–1	3–2	3–1	1–1	1–0
Guilsfield	3–2	0–1	2–0	2–3	2–2	2–1	—	4–0	1–2	0–0	2–2	4–0	4–1	4–0	1–3	3–0
Holyhead Hotspur	2–0	1–1	0–0	0–4	1–1	0–2	0–4	—	0–6	0–4	2–3	2–2	1–1	1–2	0–2	1–2
Holywell Town	2–1	4–0	2–0	1–6	3–1	2–0	4–0	0–0	—	1–2	2–1	2–0	2–0	4–0	1–0	2–0
Llandudno	5–0	4–0	3–1	2–2	1–0	2–0	2–1	5–2	3–0	—	4–0	1–2	2–2	0–1	5–2	0–1
Llanidloes Town	4–1	1–2	2–0	2–3	0–2	2–2	2–2	3–1	0–3	0–1	—	3–2	1–1	2–3	0–3	2–1
Mold Alexandra	2–0	3–4	1–0	0–3	5–2	1–2	0–1	3–1	0–2	0–3	4–0	—	3–1	2–2	1–1	1–2
Penrhyncoch	3–4	2–5	1–1	0–2	2–5	1–0	1–2	2–1	0–5	0–2	2–0	2–2	—	0–3	1–2	1–1
Porthmadog	1–1	1–2	0–5	0–2	3–1	0–1	1–2	1–1	2–3	0–2	3–0	0–1	2–1	—	2–0	0–4
Prestatyn Town	1–2	8–0	1–5	2–3	5–2	1–0	3–4	4–1	1–2	1–2	2–2	2–0	5–0	2–1	—	3–1
Ruthin Town	4–2	1–2	3–2	1–6	4–0	3–1	0–1	2–0	1–4	1–1	2–0	1–1	2–1	1–0	3–1	—

Source: Cymru North Match Results
Legend: Blue = home team win; Yellow = draw; Red = away team win.
