= Llandudno Albion F.C. =

Association football club in Wales

Coordinates: 53°18′56.876″N 3°49′46.553″W

Llandudno Albion
- Full name: Llandudno Albion Football Club
- Nickname: Albion
- Founded: 2014
- Dissolved: 2023
- Chairman: Paul Cheung
- 2022–23: Ardal NW League, 11th of 14

Llandudno Albion Football Club was a Welsh football team based in Llandudno, in Conwy County Borough, Wales.

== History ==
The club was formed in the summer of 2014 and accepted into the Vale of Clwyd and Conwy League Division One. They finished runners-up in their first year in the league, gaining promotion to the Premier Division. They were champions in their first season in that league. In the Welsh Alliance League Division Two they were champions again at their first attempt, securing their third successive promotion. In the Welsh Alliance League Division One In their first season they finished seventh.

In February 2023, the club announced that they would fold at the end of the 2022–23 season.

== Honours ==
- Welsh Alliance League Division Two – Champions: 2016–17
- Vale of Clwyd and Conwy League Premier Division – Champions: 2015–16
- Vale of Clwyd and Conwy League Division One – Runners-up: 2014–15
- NWCFA Intermediate Cup – Runners-up: 2015–16
- North Wales Coast FA Junior Challenge Cup – Winners: 2014–15
- REM Jones Cup – Winners: 2014–15
- Presidents Cup – Runners-up: 2014–15;
- Vale of Clwyd and Conwy League Premier Division Cup – Runners-up: 2015–16
- Mawddach Challenge Cup – Winners: 2017–18
