= Rhostyllen F.C. =

Association football club in Wales

Coordinates: 53°1′53.2″N 3°1′50.4″W

Rhostyllen
- Full name: Rhostyllen Football Club
- Nickname: The Village
- Founded: 2015
- Ground: Vicarage Hill; Rhostyllen; Wrexham
- League: North East Wales Division One
- 2025–26: North East Wales Division One, 3rd of 12
Home colours

Rhostyllen Football Club is a Welsh football club from Rhostyllen in Wrexham County Borough. The club was founded in 2015 and they play in the North East Wales Division One.

== History ==
The first football club in Rhostyllen dates back to 1879 and existed until 1881. The club then reformed as Rhostyllen Victoria in 1881 and contested the Welsh Cup. On 15 April 1889 during a match between Wales and Scotland at The Racecourse, Wrexham, Alf Pugh, a Rhostyllen Victoria player, became the first ever player to be substituted in international football.

The current incarnation were formed in 2015, and began playing in the 2015–16 season in the North East Wales League, a competition which it won.

The following season, the team achieved second consecutive promotion when it finished second in the Welsh National League Division One.

== Seasons ==
Season	League										Welsh Cup	FAW Trophy	Other
Season	Division	P	W	D	L	F	A	Pts	Pos	PPG	Welsh Cup	FAW Trophy	Other
2015-16	North East Wales Football League	20	16	3	1	121	31	51	1			SF	North East Wales FA Junior (Horace Wynne) Cup Winners
2016-17	Welsh National League Division One	22	16	2	4	114	35	50	2		QR1	3R	Welsh National League Division One League Cup Winners
2017-18	Welsh National League Premier Division	28	11	3	5	50	64	35	11		QR2	2R	
2018-19	Welsh National League Premier Division	28	7	3	18	38	85	24	11		1R	3R	
2019-20	Welsh National League Premier Division	18	13	2	3	64	28	-13	16	-0.71			

== Honours ==
=== League ===
- Welsh National League Division One

Runner Up (1): 2017

- North East Wales Football League

Winner (1): 2016

=== Cups ===
- North East Wales FA Junior (Horace Wynne) Cup

Winner (1): 2016
Finalist: 2024–25

- Welsh National League Division One League Cup

Winner (1): 2017
