= John Danby (footballer) =

English footballer (born 1983)

Personal information
- Full name: John Robert Danby
- Date of birth: 20 September 1983 (age 43)
- Place of birth: Stoke, England
- Height: 6 ft 2 in (1.88 m)
- Position: Goalkeeper

Team information
- Current team: Bangor City 1876
- Number: 1

Senior career*
Years	Team	Apps	(Gls)
2001–2006	Kidderminster Harriers	76	(0)
2006–2010	Chester City	161	(0)
2010–2011	Eastwood Town	40	(0)
2011–2014	Chester	100	(0)
2014–2015	Bradford Park Avenue	32	(0)
2015–2019	Connah's Quay Nomads	119	(0)
2019–2021	Flint Town United	28	(0)
2022–2025	Flint Mountain	53	(0)
2025–2026	Holywell Town	27	(0)
2026–	Bangor City 1876	7	(0)
- * Club domestic league appearances and goals as of 16:28, 12 September 2026 (UTC)

John Robert Danby (born 20 September 1983) is an English footballer who plays as a goalkeeper for Cymru North team Bangor City 1876.

Danby played for much of his career at Chester City, and the subsequent phoenix club Chester, although he has also played for Kidderminster Harriers, Eastwood Town, Bradford Park Avenue, Connah's Quay Nomads and Flint Town United.

== Career ==
Born in Stoke, Danby came through youth system and spent five seasons with Kidderminster Harriers before beigh released and signed for Chester City in 2006. Danby's time with Kidderminster saw them relegated out of The Football League in 2004–05 but he established himself as a promising young goalkeeper.

He went on to enjoy a successful 2006–07 season with Chester and was named the club's player of the season. Despite the signing of the experienced Gavin Ward, Danby was selected in goal for Chester's opening game of the 2007–08 season against Chesterfield. In two full seasons he did not miss any of Chester's competitive first–team matches, although he went off injured in a Football League Trophy tie against Crewe Alexandra in September 2007 and in a league match against Darlington in March 2008.

On 12 August 2008, Danby made his 128th consecutive start for Chester in The Football League at Barnet, to break a record set more than 40 years earlier by Mike Metcalf. But his hopes of completing a third successive season without missing a match were ended after he injured his shoulder at Notts County on 4 April 2009 and was ruled out for the remainder of the campaign. Therefore, Chester brought in James Spencer in on loan.

Following the expulsion of Chester City from the Conference in February 2010, he joined Eastwood Town in March 2010.

He later rejoined the phoenix club Chester on 9 June 2011 despite reported interest from three Football Conference sides. John became first choice goalkeeper in two consecutive Chester championships in Northern Premier League and Conference North, also winning Non-league Goalkeeper of the Year award in 2012. He started the third season as number one but fell out of favour midway through the campaign after manager Neil Young left the club. Later, Danby, whose contract was part-time, had been unable to train with the squad following the switch to daytime training for the 2014–15 season owing to his personal training business.

In September 2014 he joined Conference North side Bradford Park Avenue, where he spent one season.

Danby switched to the Welsh Premier League joining Connah's Quay Nomads in May 2015. He made his competitive Nomads debut in August as the club reached the Europa League for the first time where he kept two European clean sheets in the defeat of Norwegian side Stabek, while along with The Nomads' defence, conceded the fewest goals in the league. This included a run of four successive clean sheets at the beginning of the campaign, and reached a total of 15 clean sheets by the end of the season. As a result, Danby was named in the Welsh Premier League Team of the Season by the Managers of opposing WPL sides. Danby went on to make a total of 175 starts in all competitions for The Nomads within four seasons, winning the Welsh Cup in the 2017/18 season. Danby's last act as a Nomads player was to find himself voted on to the bench of the Welsh Premier League Team of the Season in June 2019.

At the end of the 2018–19 season John Danby was released by Connah's Quay Nomads and joined second-tier Welsh side Flint Town United, after one season in Cymru North he returned to the Welsh Premier League as the club finished second and was promoted. He departed the club in February 2021 due to work and family commitments.

In July 2026 he signed for Bangor City 1876.

== Career statistics ==
As of match played 20 July 2025

Appearances and goals by club, season and competition
Club	Season	League			National Cup		League Cup		Other		Total	
Club	Season	Division	Apps	Goals	Apps	Goals	Apps	Goals	Apps	Goals	Apps	Goals
Kidderminster Harriers	2001–02	Third Division	3	0	0	0	0	0	0	0	3	0
Kidderminster Harriers	2002–03	Third Division	0	0	0	0	0	0	0	0	0	0
Kidderminster Harriers	2003–04	League Two	9	0	0	0	0	0	0	0	9	0
Kidderminster Harriers	2004–05	League Two	37	0	0	0	1	0	1 (Note: Appearance(s) in Football League Trophy)	0	39	0
Kidderminster Harriers	2005–06	Conference National	27	0	0	0	—		2 (Note: One appearance in Football League Trophy, one appearance in FA Trophy)	0	29	0
Kidderminster Harriers	Total		76	0	0	0	1	0	3	0	80	0
Chester City	2006–07	League Two	46	0	5	0	1	0	2	0	54	0
Chester City	2007–08	League Two	46	0	1	0	1	0	2	0	50	0
Chester City	2008–09	League Two	41	0	1	0	1	0	1	0	44	0
Chester City	2009–10	Conference Premier	28	0	2	0	—		1 (Note: Appearance(s) in FA Trophy)	0	31	0
Chester City	Total		161	0	9	0	3	0	6	0	179	0
Eastwood Town	2010–11	Conference North	40	0	2	0	—		3	0	45	0
Chester	2011–12	NPL Premier Division	29	0	—		—		6 (Note: Five appearances in FA Trophy, one in Cheshire Senior Cup)	0	35	0
Chester	2012–13	Conference North	41	0	4	0	—		2	0	47	0
Chester	2013–14	Conference Premier	30	0	1	0	—		2 (Note: One appearance in FA Trophy, one appearance in Cheshire Senior Cup)	0	33	0
Chester	Total		100	0	5	0	0	0	10	0	115	0
Bradford Park Avenue	2014–15	Conference North	32	0	2	0	—		1	0	35	0
Connah's Quay Nomads	2015–16	Welsh Premier League	30	0	4	0	4	0	0	0	38	0
Connah's Quay Nomads	2016–17	Welsh Premier League	30	0	4	0	4	0	4 (Note: Appearance(s) in UEFA Europa League)	0	42	0
Connah's Quay Nomads	2017–18	Welsh Premier League	32	0	5	0	0	0	3 (Note: Two appearances in UEFA Europa League, one appearance in Scottish Challenge Cup)	0	40	0
Connah's Quay Nomads	2018–19	Welsh Premier League	27	0	5	0	1	0	6 (Note: Two appearances in UEFA Europa League, four appearances in Scottish Challenge Cup)	0	39	0
Connah's Quay Nomads	Total		119	0	18	0	9	0	13	0	159	0
Flint Town United	2019–20	Cymru North	17	0	1	0	1	0	0	0	19	0
Flint Town United	2020–21	Welsh Premier League	11	0	0	0	0	0	0	0	11	0
Flint Town United	Total		28	0	1	0	1	0	0	0	30	0
Flint Mountain	2022–23	Ardal NW	18	0	1	0	2	0	1 (Note: Appearance(s) in FAW Trophy)	0	22	0
Flint Mountain	2023–24	Ardal NW	23	0	4	0	2	0	4 (Note: Three appearances in FAW Trophy, one appearance in North East Wales Challenge Cup)	0	33	0
Flint Mountain	2024–25	Cymru North	12	0	0	0	1	0	0	0	13	0
Flint Mountain	Total		53	0	5	0	5	0	5	0	68	0
Career total			609	0	42	0	19	0	41	0	711	0

== Career honours ==
Chester City

- Player of the Season: 2006–07
- Club record: Most consecutive Football League starts (133)

Chester FC

- Non-League goalkeeper of the year 2011–12
- Northern Premier League Winners 2011–12
- Peter Swales Shield Winners 2012
- Conference North Winners 2012–13

Connah's Quay Nomads

- Welsh Premier League Team of the Year: 2016–17, 2017–18
