= Aston Park Rangers F.C. =

Football club based in Flintshire

Aston Park Rangers
- Full name: Aston Park Rangers Football Club
- Founded: 1981
- Ground: 33 Pitch
- Chairman: Arran Whitehouse
- Manager: Scott Lamond & Mark Onens
- League: North East Wales Division One
- 2025–26: North East Wales Division Two, 2nd of 8 (promoted)
Home colours

Aston Park Rangers Football Club is a Welsh football club based in Aston, Flintshire. The team currently plays in the North East Wales Division One.

The club was founded in 1981 and has run junior teams since its foundation from ages under 6 to under 19, only entering men's football for the first time in the early 2000s. The club's junior teams have had success locally and in 2024 founded a girls section. Gary Speed played for Aston Park Rangers' junior teams while he was at school.

== History ==
The club was founded in 1981. They ran many junior sides until forming a men's team for the first time in the early 2000s, joining the Clwyd League.

The 2000s brought success for the club's new men's team. In the 2003–04 season they won the Division One title. They won the Premier Cup twice, in 2004–05 and 2006–07, and their third team won the Halkyn Cup twice in a row in 2007–08 and 2008–09.

For the 2011–12 season they were founding members of the Clwyd East Football League. In that season they went on to win the Horace Wynne Cup. In 2015 they beat Cefn Albion 2–1 to lift the Clwyd Cup, a result described as surprising by North Wales Live as Albion had already won four trophies that season. The club withdrew from the league during the 2017–18 season and the men's team folded.

After a three year hiatus the first team was reformed by then U15s coaches Christopher Foster and Arran Whitehouse as a pathway for the youth set-up and the club returned to men's football for the 2022–23 season, joining the North East Wales Football League. Their first game back in men's football was against another new side, Holywell United, and they won 2–0. The result by way of an own goal and a Kallum Pierce penalty

In the 2025–26 season and under the new management of Scott Lamond they reached the final of the inaugural NEWFA Trophy, and won 3–0 against Yr Wyddgrug to win the trophy. James Redfern and Jack Fox-Cody with the goals. The team were also promoted as runners-up in the North East Wales League Division Two.

The 2026-27 season saw the club create a separate XI team that compete in division two of the North East Wales Reserve League.

The 2026-27 season also welcomed the formation of a women's recreational team that compete in the North East Wales Recreational League.

== Honours ==
- Clwyd League Division One - Champions: 2003–04
- Horace Wynne Cup - Winners: 2011–12
- NEWFA Trophy - Winners: 2025–26
- Clwyd Cup - Winners: 2015–16
- Premier Cup - Winners: 2004–05, 2006–07
- Halkyn Cup - Winners: 2007–08, 2008–09 (third team)

== Players ==
=== Current Squad ===
Note: Flags indicate national team as defined under FIFA eligibility rules; some limited exceptions apply. Players may hold more than one non-FIFA nationality.

No.	Pos.	Nation	Player
—	GK	WAL	Jay Jay Bell
—	GK	WAL	Marley Edwards
—	DF	ENG	Rhys Jones
—	DF	ENG	Billy Hart
—	DF	WAL	Liam Williams
—	DF	WAL	Charlie Forrester
—	DF	WAL	Matthew Dixon
—	DF	ENG	Matthew Leedham
—	DF	ENG	Tom Barbet
—	DF	WAL	Lewis Jones
—	DF	WAL	Sam Williams
—	DF	WAL	Riley Edwards
—	DF	WAL	Harrison Pendrey
—	DF	ENG	DJ Marsh
—	DF	WAL	Lewis Cooke
—	DF	WAL	Charlie Jones
—	MF	ENG	Tom Beacher

No.	Pos.	Nation	Player
—	MF	ENG	Kieren Green
—	MF	WAL	Dougie McDonagh
—	MF	ENG	Morgan Collins
—	MF	CAN	Jack Woodward
—	MF	ENG	Adam Randles
—	MF	ENG	Mason Mostyn-Jones
—	MF	ENG	Liam Ellis
—	MF	ENG	Ethan Thomas
—	MF	WAL	Rhys Chester
—	MF	WAL	Kevin Higgins
—	MF	WAL	Kian Edwards
—	MF	CYP	Harrison Keen
—	FW	POR	Estevao Gomes
—	FW	WAL	Mason Lowery
—	FW	ENG	Tommy Gardner
—	FW	WAL	Kallum Pierce
—	FW	ENG	James Redfern
—	FW	ENG	Kyle Molyneux
—	FW	WAL	Jack Fox-Cody
—	FW	WAL	Joey Robinson
—	FW	WAL	Lennon Young
—	FW	ENG	Lee Molyneux
—	FW	ENG	Ryan Edge
—	FW	ENG	Jake Molyneux
—	FW	WAL	Nathan Chester
