= 2024–25 Cymru North =

Cymru North
- Season: 2024–25
- Champions: Colwyn Bay (2nd title)
- Promoted: Colwyn Bay
- Relegated: Bangor 1876; Llay Welfare; Prestatyn Town
- Matches: 240
- Goals: 904 (3.77 per match)
- Top goalscorer: Danny Warren (24 goals)
- Biggest home win: Caersws 8–0 Prestatyn Town (2 November 2024)
- Biggest away win: Gresford Athletic 0–7 Flint Mountain (17 January 2025)
- Highest scoring: Airbus UK Broughton 8–3 Holywell Town (25 October 2024)
- Longest winning run: 16 – Colwyn Bay (23 August 2024–8 February 2025)
- Longest unbeaten run: 29 – Colwyn Bay (6 August 2024–end of season)
- Longest winless run: 12 – Prestatyn Town (13 September 2024–25 January 2025)/Llay Welfare (21 December 2024–29 March 2025)
- Longest losing run: 12 – Prestatyn Town (13 September 2024–25 January 2025)
- Highest attendance: 1378 - Colwyn Bay 0–4 Llandudno (5 April 2024)
- Lowest attendance: 23 - Ruthin Town 0–2 Caersws (28 September 2024)
- Average attendance: 267

The 2024–25 Cymru North season (also known as the 2024–25 JD Cymru North season for sponsorship reasons) was the fifth season of the second-tier northern region football league in the Welsh football pyramid.

== Teams ==
The league consisted of 16 clubs - 12 teams remaining from the previous season, one team relegated from the Cymru Premier, and three promoted from the Ardal Leagues.

Penrhyncoch and Flint Mountain were promoted as champions of the 2023–24 Ardal NE and 2023–24 Ardal NW respectively, while Ardal NW runners-up Llay Welfare defeated Ardal NE third-placed team Llanuwchllyn in the Ardal Northern play-off to also earn promotion. The three promoted teams replaced the three relegated 2023–24 Cymru North teams (Chirk AAA, Llanidloes Town, and Porthmadog). Colwyn Bay were relegated from the 2023–24 Cymru Premier, replacing the promoted 2023–24 Cymru North runners-up (Flint Town United).

=== Stadia and locations ===
Locations of teams in the 2024–25 Cymru North

Team	Home City	Home Ground	Capacity
Airbus UK Broughton	Broughton	The Airfield	1,600
Bangor 1876	Bangor	Nantporth	3,000
Buckley Town	Buckley	The Globe	1,000
Caersws	Caersws	Recreation Ground	4,000
Colwyn Bay	Old Colwyn	Llanelian Road	3,000
Denbigh Town	Denbigh	Central Park	1,200
Flint Mountain	Flint	Essity Stadium	3,000
Gresford Athletic	Gresford	The Airfield	1,600
Guilsfield	Guilsfield	Community Centre Ground	1,100
Holywell Town	Holywell	Halkyn Road	2,000
Llandudno	Llandudno	OPS Wind Arena	1,013
Llay Welfare	Llay	The Ring	1,000
Mold Alexandra	Mold	Alyn Park	3,000
Penrhyncoch	Penrhyncoch	Cae Baker	1,000
Prestatyn Town	Prestatyn	Bastion Road	2,500
Ruthin Town	Ruthin	Memorial Playing Fields	2,000

=== Personnel and kits ===
Team	Manager	Captain	Kit manufacturer	Shirt sponsor (chest)
Airbus UK Broughton	(Wales) Mark Allen	(Wales) Joe Palmer	Adidas	Gardner Aerospace
Bangor 1876	(Wales) Michael Johnston	(Wales) Tomos Clarke	Joma	Watkin Property Ventures
Buckley Town	(Wales) Asa Hamilton	(Wales) Callum Humphries	TAG Sportswear	Thomas Roofing
Caersws	(Wales) Neil Lewis	(Wales) Harry Cottam	Macron	Gellidywyll Holiday Home Park
Colwyn Bay	(England) Michael Wilde	(Wales) Sam Hart	Hope + Glory	KHS
Denbigh Town	(Wales) Dewi Llion	(Wales) Kieron Roberts	Macron	Travelsport & Lock Stock Self Storage
Flint Mountain	(England) Aden Shannon	(England) Joe Holt	Arrow Sportswear	Double Time Distribution
Gresford Athletic	(Wales) Eddie Maurice-Jones	(Wales) Josh Griffiths	Macron	Eurogold
Guilsfield	(Wales) Gavin Allen	(Wales) Jake Cook	Macron	Hardings Garden Centre
Holywell Town	(England) Johnny Haseldin	(England) Danny Andrews	Joma	Achieve More Training
Llandudno	(Wales) Jordan Hadaway	(Wales) Ross Weaver	Macron	Offshore Painting Services
Llay Welfare	(England) Jord Scott	(Wales) Max Peate	Joma	AST Plastic Containers
Mold Alexandra	(Wales) Barry Owen	(England) Henry Nash	Joma	Vision
Penrhyncoch	(Wales) Gari Lewis	(Wales) Tom Evans	Joma	Sterling
Prestatyn Town	(Wales) Gareth Thomas	(Wales) James Stead	Joma	Lola's Bar
Ruthin Town	(England) Dave Evans	(Wales) Osian Davies	Macron	GJ Teeson Ltd

=== Managerial changes ===
Team	Outgoing manager	Manner of departure	Date of vacancy	Position in table	Incoming manager	Date of appointment
Mold Alexandra	(Wales) Mike Cunningham	Resigned	10 April 2024	Pre-season	(Wales) Barry Owen	21 May 2024
Colwyn Bay	(Wales) Steve Evans	Sacked	21 April 2024	Pre-season	(England) Michael Wilde	11 May 2024
Llay Welfare	(England) Mike Gadie	Changed role	12 May 2024	Pre-season	(Wales) Mike Price	12 May 2024
Guilsfield	(England) Nathan Leonard	Resigned	13 June 2024	Pre-season	(England) Matt Burton	25 September 2024
Llay Welfare	(Wales) Mike Price	Resigned	27 June 2024	Pre-season	(England) Phil Hudson	27 June 2024
Prestatyn Town	(Wales) Matty Roberts	Resigned	23 August 2024	14th	(Wales) Chris Morrell	9 September 2024
Prestatyn Town	(Wales) Chris Morrell	Resigned	6 October 2024	15th	(Wales) Gareth Thomas	17 November 2024
Llay Welfare	(England) Phil Hudson	Mutual consent	24 October 2024	16th	(England) Jord Scott	25 October 2024
Guilsfield	(England) Matt Burton	Resigned	18 November 2024	12th	(Wales) Gavin Allen	18 November 2024
Caersws	(Wales) Luke Williams	Sacked	1 March 2025	12th	(Wales) Neil Lewis	1 March 2025

== League table ==
Pos	Team	Pld	W	D	L	GF	GA	GD	Pts	Promotion or relegation
1	Colwyn Bay (C, P)	30	26	3	1	88	22	+66	81	Promotion to the Cymru Premier
2	Airbus UK Broughton	30	25	3	2	102	30	+72	78	
3	Holywell Town	30	18	3	9	56	41	+15	57	
4	Llandudno	30	15	4	11	65	60	+5	49	
5	Buckley Town	30	14	5	11	48	47	+1	47	
6	Guilsfield	30	13	6	11	59	52	+7	45	
7	Flint Mountain	30	13	5	12	68	56	+12	44	
8	Mold Alexandra	30	13	5	12	52	48	+4	44	
9	Denbigh Town	30	12	7	11	68	62	+6	43	
10	Penrhyncoch	30	11	7	12	48	52	−4	40	
11	Gresford Athletic	30	11	5	14	44	67	−23	38	
12	Caersws	30	10	4	16	47	55	−8	34	
13	Ruthin Town	30	8	5	17	40	59	−19	29	
14	Bangor 1876 (R)	30	8	4	18	46	64	−18	28	Relegation to the Ardal NW
15	Prestatyn Town (R)	30	4	1	25	38	105	−67	13	Relegation to the Ardal NW
16	Llay Welfare (R)	30	3	5	22	35	84	−49	11 (Note: Llay Welfare were deducted three points for fielding an ineligible player against Gresford Athletic on 26 July 2024.)	Relegation to the Ardal NW

Source: Cymru North
Rules for classification: 1) Points; 2) Goal difference; 3) Goals scored; 4) Matches won; 5) Play-off.
(C) Champions; (P) Promoted; (R) Relegated

== Results ==
Teams play each other twice on a home and away basis.

Home \ Away	AIR	BAN	BUC	CAE	COL	DEN	FLT	GRE	GUI	HWL	LND	LYW	MOL	PRC	PRE	RUT
Airbus UK Broughton	—	4–1	3–2	5–0	1–1	7–0	4–1	2–0	1–1	8–3	5–0	1–0	1–1	2–0	7–3	7–0
Bangor 1876	1–7	—	0–2	1–2	1–3	3–4	4–1	1–0	1–4	2–2	2–3	3–0	3–0	1–1	4–2	3–0
Buckley Town	2–3	2–1	—	2–4	1–2	0–5	2–1	3–0	1–1	2–0	3–3	3–0	1–2	0–0	3–2	0–0
Caersws	2–3	0–0	3–0	—	1–2	1–1	0–1	0–1	5–3	2–0	1–5	3–2	0–1	1–2	8–0	2–1
Colwyn Bay	6–3	0–4	3–1	3–1	—	1–0	2–1	6–0	3–2	2–0	3–0	1–1	5–0	4–0	7–0	3–0
Denbigh Town	0–4	2–1	1–2	2–0	2–4	—	0–2	5–1	3–2	2–4	6–2	5–0	1–1	3–0	2–1	2–2
Flint Mountain	1–2	4–0	3–4	2–3	1–5	4–4	—	1–0	1–5	1–1	2–1	4–2	3–0	5–1	3–2	7–0
Gresford Athletic	0–3	2–0	1–3	3–1	0–5	3–3	0–7	—	1–0	3–0	3–4	1–1	2–2	1–1	6–2	1–0
Guilsfield	1–2	2–1	1–0	1–2	0–5	4–3	1–1	4–1	—	2–1	1–1	6–1	1–2	4–2	2–2	3–1
Holywell Town	2–1	2–1	2–0	3–1	0–2	0–2	1–2	0–0	2–1	—	3–1	2–0	1–0	2–1	6–0	5–1
Llandudno	1–2	0–2	2–3	2–0	1–1	2–2	1–0	5–2	4–0	0–2	—	3–2	3–1	3–0	3–2	5–2
Llay Welfare	0–5	1–1	1–2	1–0	1–2	3–2	1–1	1–3	1–2	2–5	1–3	—	2–4	1–1	3–2	3–5
Mold Alexandra	0–3	6–1	3–1	2–2	0–1	2–1	2–1	1–3	0–1	2–3	3–1	4–1	—	1–2	7–0	2–0
Penrhyncoch	1–3	3–2	0–0	4–1	0–1	4–2	6–1	2–4	1–1	0–1	5–0	1–0	0–0	—	4–2	1–3
Prestatyn Town	0–2	4–1	0–2	1–0	0–4	1–2	1–5	0–2	1–3	0–1	1–4	6–2	1–3	1–2	—	1–0
Ruthin Town	0–1	1–0	0–1	1–1	0–1	1–1	1–1	4–0	2–0	0–2	0–2	3–1	3–0	2–3	7–0	—

Source: Cymru North Match Results
Legend: Blue = home team win; Yellow = draw; Red = away team win.
