= Ruabon Rovers F.C. =

Association football club in Wales

Ruabon Rovers
- Full name: Ruabon Rovers Football Club
- Nickname: Rovers
- Founded: 2020
- Ground: The Rec
- League: North East Wales Division Two
- 2025–26: North East Wales Division One, 11th of 12 (relegated)

Ruabon Rovers Football Club are a Welsh football club from the village of Ruabon in Wrexham County Borough, Wales. They play in the North East Wales Division Two.

== History ==
The village of Ruabon can be regarded as the ‘birthplace of pêl-droed‘. The Football Association of Wales' founder Llewelyn Kenrick was born, raised, and died in the village. In May 1876, a meeting was called, in the ballroom of the Wynnstay Arms Hotel in Ruabon where the name was agreed as the "Football Association of Wales" and the constitution was drawn up.

Given Ruabon’s significance to the early days of Welsh football, a club from the village played in the first edition of the Welsh Cup in the 1877-78 season. In October 1872, Ruabon Rovers were founded by brothers David and George Thomson before in 1874 the club became Plasmadoc F.C. before changing their name to Druids F.C. in 1876.

In 2020 a club with the same name was formed to play in the North East Wales Football League. Unfortunately, given the cancellation of season due to the Coronavirus Pandemic, their first season was postponed to the 2021–22 season when they finished 3rd in the tier five Championship. The following season they won the Championship, gaining promotion to the tier four Premier Division.

== Honours ==
- North East Wales Football League Championship Division – Champions: 2022–23
