= Cefn Mawr Rangers F.C. =

Association football club in Wales

Cefn Mawr Rangers
- Full name: Cefn Mawr Rangers Football Club
- Nickname: Rangers
- Founded: 2016
- Ground: The Muga, Cefn Mawr
- 2021–22: North East Wales Premier Division, 7th of 12 (withdrew from league after season)

Cefn Mawr Rangers Football Club is a Welsh football team based in Cefn Mawr, in the community of Cefn within the County Borough of Wrexham, Wales. The team last played in the North East Wales Football League Premier Division, which is at the fourth tier of the Welsh football league system. They currently run junior level teams.

== History ==
The club was established in 2016 to reform Flexsys FC after a five year gap. In their first season they played in the North East Wales League, finishing third and gaining promotion to the Welsh National League (Wrexham Area), also winning the Horace Wynne Cup and Queensway Presidential Cup. The club had planned to play in the North East Wales Football League Premier Division for the 2022–23 season but resigned from the league in July 2022.

== Honours ==
- Welsh National League (Wrexham Area) Division One – Runners-up: 2018–19
- North East Wales FA Junior (Horace Wynne) Cup – Winners: 2016–17
- Queensway Presidential Cup – Winners: 2016–17
