= Connah's Quay Town F.C. =

Men's football club in Wales

Connah's Quay Town Football Club
- Full name: Connah’s Quay Town Football Club
- Nickname: Town
- Founded: 2020
- Ground: Deeside Stadium
- Manager: Gavin Parry
- League: Ardal NW League
- 2025–26: Ardal NW League, 15th of 16
- Website: https://www.cqtownfc.com/

Connah's Quay Town FC is a Welsh football team based in Connah's Quay, Flintshire, Wales. The team currently plays in the Ardal NW League.

The current team was formed in 2020. In 2024, the club was promoted to the Ardal Leagues, and moved to the Deeside Stadium. The Club is led by First Team Manager Gavin Parry, and Assistant Manager Bobby Raggett.

The previous Connah's Quay Town club was founded in 2009, and played in the Welsh Alliance League.

== Honours ==
- North East Wales Football League Premier Division – Runners–up: 2022–23, 2023–24
- North East Wales Football League Championship Division – Champions: 2021–22
- North East Wales Football League Reserves Division - Champions: 2024-25

- North East Wales Two Counties Cup – Winners: 2021–22
- Mike Beech Memorial Trophy - Winners: 2021–22
- Premier Cup – Winners: 2022–23
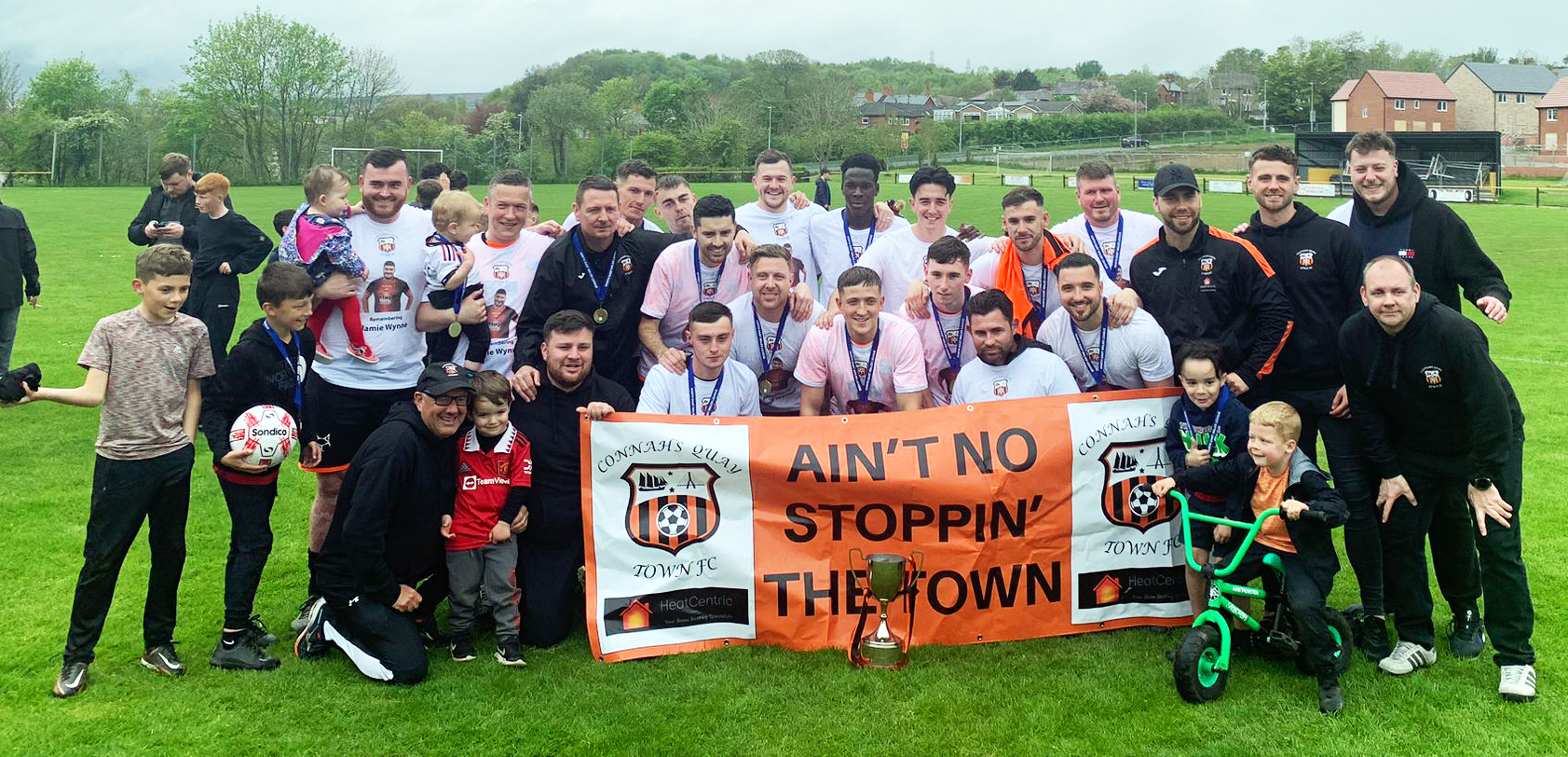
  Connah's Quay Town FC - Premier Cup Winners 2022-2023

== Staff ==
- Chairperson: Rob Ross
- Vice-Chairperson: Scott Clarke
- Secretary: Debi Ross
- Sporting Director: Llewys Benbow
- Press Officer: Vince Froggatt
- First Team Manager: Gavin Parry
- First Team Assistant Manager: Bobby Raggett
- First Team Coach: Stephen Hopkins
- First Team Goalkeeping Coach: Ryan Stretton
- First Team First Aider : Connor Woolley
- Reserves Team Manager: Zak Williams
- Reserves Team Assistant Manager: Ashley Whales
- Reserves Team Coach: Paul Joyner
- Reserves Team First Aider : Joe Ross
