= Bellevue F.C. =

Football club based in Wrexham

- Full name: Bellevue Football Club
- Ground: Wrexham Recreation Ground, Court Road, Wrexham
- Manager: Anne Marie Withers
- League: North East Wales Division Three
- 2024–25: North East Wales Championship, 12th of 15 (relegated)
- Website: https://www.bellevue-fc.cymru
| Home colours | Away colours |

Bellevue Football Club is a Welsh football club based in Wrexham. They currently play in the North East Wales Division Three. The club has won a number of awards for their work in equality, diversity, and inclusion since forming in 2016.

== History ==
The club was founded in 2016 after a discussion about starting a football team, between a group of friends under a tree at Bellevue Park in Wrexham. This is the tree represented prominently on the club badge. In 2017 they joined the North East Wales League.

The club emphasises inclusion of people from all backgrounds - in May 2025 it was reported that its teams included 17 different nationalities. They have also been described as the "most diverse football club in the world".

In January 2022 a match was played against a team from Wrexham Town Police Station, aiming to "break down barriers" through the use of football.

Anne Marie Withers is the head coach of the men's team. She is the first female coach of a men's team in North Wales.
