= FC Queens Park =

- Full name: FC Queens Park
- Founded: 2013
- Ground: Queensway Stadium Caia Park, Wrexham
- Manager: Craig Roberts
- League: Ardal NE League
- 2025–26: North East Wales Division One, 1st of 12 (promoted)
Home colours	Away colours

FC Queens Park are a football team based in Caia Park, Wrexham, Wales. They play in the Ardal NE League.

== History ==
FC Queens Park were formed in 2013. In their first season they entered the Clwyd East League, a competition which they won at the first attempt and were subsequently promoted. Further success followed when they won the 2014–15 Welsh National League First Division, and again achieved promotion. FC Queens Park adapted well to life in Welsh National League Premier Division when they finished 3rd in 2015–16. In the 2016–17 season the club achieved their third promotion in four season when they became champions of Welsh National League Premier Division. They were promoted to play in the Cymru Alliance for the 2017–18 season.

The club joined the newly formed North East Wales Football League in 2020 as a Premier Division club.

== League history ==
Season	League							
Season	Tier	Division	Played	Won	Drew	Lost	Points	Position
2013-14	5	Clwyd East Football League	20	19	1	0	58	1
2014-15	4	Welsh National League First Division	24	19	3	2	60	1
2015-16	3	Welsh National League Premier Division	26	17	2	7	53	3
2016-17	3	Welsh National League Premier Division	26	22	1	3	67	1
2017-18	2	Cymru Alliance	28	2	3	23	9	14
2018-19	3	Welsh National League Premier Division	28	20	3	5	60	2*
2019-20	3	Welsh National League Premier Division	20	12	4	4	20	4
2020-21	4	North East Wales League Premier Division						

== Cup history ==
Season	Cup	Round	Opposition	Score
2015-16	Welsh Cup	First Round	Penrhyndeudraeth	0-2
2015-16	FAW Trophy	Round 2	Halkyn United	5-3
2015-16	FAW Trophy	Round 3	Llanidloes Town	4-2
2015-16	FAW Trophy	Round 4	Rhos Aelwyd	4-3
2015-16	FAW Trophy	Round 5	Penrhyncoch	1-0
2015-16	FAW Trophy	Quarter Final	Llandudno Junction	3-1
2015-16	FAW Trophy	Semi Final	Abergavenny Town	0-7
2016-17	Welsh Cup	Qualifier Round 2	Corwen	1-4
2016-17	FAW Trophy	Round 3	Rhos Aelwyd	5-3
2016-17	FAW Trophy	Round 4	St Asaph City	1-2

== Honours ==
=== League ===
- North East Wales Football League Premier Division (Tier 4)

Winner (1): 2022–23

- North East Wales Football League Division One (Tier 4)

Winner (1}: 2025–26

- Welsh National League Premier Division

Winner (1): 2016–17
Third (1): 2015–16

- Welsh National League Division One

Winner (1): 2014–15

- Clwyd East Football League

Winner (1): 2013–14

=== Cups ===
- North East Wales FA Challenge Cup

Runner-Up (1): 2017

- Welsh National League Division One League Cup

Winner (1): 2015

- North East Wales FA Junior (Horace Wynne) Cup

Winner (4): 2013–14, 2021–22; 2022–23, 2024–25

- Mike Beech Memorial Trophy

Winner: 2022–23

- North East Wales Football League Premier Cup

Winner: 2025–26

== Notes ==
Also see GAP Queens Park, who folded in 2008 after playing the Cymru Alliance.
