= 2023–24 Ardal NW =

Ardal NW
- Season: 2023–24
- Champions: Flint Mountain
- Promoted: Flint Mountain; Llay Welfare
- Relegated: Bethesda Athletic; Hawarden Rangers; Saltney Town

The 2023–24 Ardal NW season (also known as the 2023–24 Lock Stock Ardal NW season for sponsorship reasons) was the third season of the new third-tier northern region football league in the Welsh football pyramid, part of the Ardal Leagues.

The winners (Flint Mountain) were promoted to the 2024–25 Cymru North. The runners-up (Llay Welfare) were also promoted after winning the Ardal Northern play-off. The bottom three teams (Bethesda Athletic, Hawarden Rangers, and Saltney Town) were relegated to Tier 4.

== Teams ==
The league was made up of sixteen teams; ten teams remaining from the previous season, four teams promoted from Tier 4, and two teams relegated from the 2022–23 Cymru North.

The teams promoted from Tier 4 were St Asaph City and Llannefydd from the North Wales Coast East Football League Premier Division, and Bethesda Athletic and Pwllheli from the North Wales Coast West Football League Premier Division (replacing the relegated Ardal NE team of Rhostyllen, the withdrawn Ardal NE teams of Bodedern Athletic and Rhydymwyn, and the folded team of Llandudno Albion). The teams relegated from the Cymru North were Conwy Borough and Holyhead Hotspur (replacing the promoted Ardal NE teams of Denbigh Town and Bangor 1876).

=== Stadia and locations ===
Locations of teams in the 2023–24 Ardal NW

Team	Location	Home Ground	Capacity
Bethesda Athletic	Bethesda	Parc Meurig	500
Brickfield Rangers	Wrexham	Clywedog Park	1,000
Conwy Borough	Conwy	Y Morfa Stadium	2,500
Flint Mountain	Pentre Halkyn	Cae-y-Castell	2,000
Hawarden Rangers	Hawarden	Gladstone Playing Fields	1,000
Holyhead Hotspur	Holyhead	The New Oval	
Llangefni Town	Llangefni	Cae Bob Parry	4,500
Llannefydd	Llannefydd	Cae Llannefydd	
Llanrwst United	Llanrwst	Gwydyr Park	2,000
Llay Welfare	Llay	The Ring	1,000
Nantlle Vale	Penygroes	Maes Dulyn	1,000
Pwllheli	Pwllheli	Leisure Centre	200
Saltney Town	Saltney	Saltney Community Centre	1,000
St Asaph City	St Asaph	Roe Plas	
Y Felinheli	Y Felinheli	Cae Seilo	1,000
Y Rhyl 1879	Rhyl	Belle Vue	3,000

Source: Ardal NW Ground Information

== Personnel ==
Team	Head coach	Captain
Bethesda Athletic		
Brickfield Rangers	(Wales) Gareth Wilson	(Wales) Chris Dixon
Conwy Borough		
Flint Mountain	(England) Aden Shannon	(Wales) Peter Martin
Hawarden Rangers	(Wales) Andy Butler	(England) Ellis Jones
Holyhead Hotspur	Darren Garmey	
Llangefni Town	(Wales) James Saxon	(Wales) James Saxon
Llanrwst United	(Wales) Barry Owen	(Wales) Thomas Jones
Llay Welfare	(England) Mike Gadie	(Wales) Dean Bryan
Llannefydd		
Nantlle Vale	(Wales) Sion Eifion Jones	(Wales) Matthew Davies
Pwllheli	Martyn Smith	
Saltney Town	(Wales) Andy Dutton	(Wales) Tom Wells
St Asaph City		
Y Felinheli	(Wales) Euron Davies	(Wales) Aled Griffith
Y Rhyl 1879	(Wales) Gareth Thomas	(Wales) Reece Fairhurst

== League table ==
Pos	Team	Pld	W	D	L	GF	GA	GD	Pts	Promotion, qualification or relegation
1	Flint Mountain (C, P)	30	22	2	6	82	34	+48	68	Promotion to Cymru North
2	Llay Welfare (O, P)	30	21	3	6	66	33	+33	66	Qualification for the Ardal Northern play-off
3	Y Rhyl 1879	30	19	3	8	57	41	+16	60	
4	Holyhead Hotspur	30	17	5	8	63	36	+27	56	
5	Nantlle Vale	30	17	4	9	62	44	+18	55	
6	St Asaph City	30	13	8	9	63	54	+9	47	
7	Brickfield Rangers	30	13	5	12	44	52	−8	44	
8	Llangefni Town	30	11	8	11	55	46	+9	41	
9	Llannefydd	30	12	5	13	57	58	−1	41	
10	Llanrwst United	30	11	7	12	52	46	+6	40	
11	Pwllheli	30	12	3	15	53	64	−11	39	
12	Y Felinheli	30	10	2	18	38	63	−25	32	
13	Conwy Borough	30	8	7	15	56	70	−14	31	
14	Bethesda Athletic (R)	30	9	2	19	53	63	−10	29	Relegation to Tier 4
15	Hawarden Rangers (R)	30	6	3	21	44	84	−40	21	Relegation to Tier 4
16	Saltney Town (R)	30	3	5	22	33	90	−57	14	Relegation to Tier 4

Source: Ardal Northern
Rules for classification: 1) Points; 2) Goal difference; 3) Goals scored; 4) Matches won; 5) Play-off.
(C) Champions; (O) Play-off winners; (P) Promoted; (R) Relegated

== Results ==
Home \ Away	BET	BRI	CON	FLT	HAW	HOL	LGT	LLA	LRU	LYW	NTL	PWL	SAL	STA	YFL	RHY
Bethesda Athletic	—	3–2	5–8	1–2	4–0	1–2	1–2	6–1	1–5	1–3	0–2	1–3	3–2	1–1	4–0	1–2
Brickfield Rangers	5–3	—	3–0	0–3	2–1	3–2	0–0	1–1	4–3	0–1	1–2	2–0	1–0	2–3	1–0	0–1
Conwy Borough	0–2	1–1	—	1–5	2–3	0–3	1–1	8–3	2–0	1–1	0–3	3–1	2–2	1–5	1–2	3–0
Flint Mountain	2–1	4–1	2–3	—	4–2	4–1	4–2	2–0	1–0	2–1	1–0	3–1	5–2	0–2	1–0	6–1
Hawarden Rangers	2–2	1–2	0–1	0–3	—	1–4	1–7	2–1	3–1	1–2	2–3	2–4	3–1	3–3	4–1	1–2
Holyhead Hotspur	4–0	6–1	2–0	1–0	1–1	—	1–1	2–0	1–1	2–1	4–0	3–3	8–0	1–0	1–0	1–4
Llangefni Town	2–0	0–1	2–0	0–0	1–2	1–1	—	2–3	1–2	0–2	1–1	4–2	6–2	2–2	3–0	1–3
Llannefydd	1–2	3–0	4–2	1–6	6–1	1–2	5–2	—	2–0	2–0	2–4	4–4	6–1	1–1	2–2	0–2
Llanrwst United	3–2	2–1	1–1	3–2	4–1	3–1	1–2	1–2	—	2–3	1–1	1–1	3–1	3–1	1–1	2–4
Llay Welfare	2–1	3–0	2–1	1–5	6–0	2–0	2–1	1–0	1–1	—	3–2	6–0	1–0	4–2	6–1	1–0
Nantlle Vale	0–3	4–0	3–3	2–2	4–3	2–0	2–0	0–1	1–0	2–3	—	4–2	7–1	3–2	2–1	4–2
Pwllheli	1–0	0–3	2–3	0–2	4–2	2–1	3–1	0–2	2–0	1–2	1–2	—	1–2	2–0	2–0	3–0
Saltney Town	0–2	2–3	1–1	1–5	3–0	0–2	1–1	0–2	1–3	1–1	0–1	1–3	—	1–4	3–0	0–5
St Asaph City	1–0	3–3	4–3	3–2	3–2	3–2	1–3	0–0	0–0	2–1	2–0	3–4	5–1	—	4–2	1–2
Y Felinheli	4–2	0–1	4–3	2–0	1–0	1–3	1–2	2–0	0–4	0–4	2–1	3–1	4–1	3–0	—	0–2
Y Rhyl 1879	1–0	0–0	3–1	1–4	2–0	0–1	1–4	2–1	2–1	2–0	1–0	4–0	2–2	2–2	4–1	—

Source: Ardal Northern
Legend: Blue = home team win; Yellow = draw; Red = away team win.
