= C.P.D. Sychdyn United =

Football club based in Flintshire

Sychdyn United
- Full name: Clwb Pel Droed Sychdyn United
- Nickname: The CPD
- Founded: 1946
- Ground: Maes Bodlonfa, Mold
- League: North East Wales Division Two
- 2025–26: North East Wales Division Two, 3rd of 8
Home colours	Away colours

C.P.D. Sychdyn United is a Welsh football club based in Sychdyn, Flintshire. They currently play in the North East Wales Division Two.

== History ==
In 1985–86 Sychdyn won the NWCFA Junior Cup. They played Anglesey side Llanerchymedd in the final, and after the first game finished 2–2 after extra time, they won a replay 3–0 to win the cup. In the same season they won the Clwyd League Division One and were runners-up in the Clwyd Cup.

In 2016 Sychdyn finished runners-up in the North East Wales League but were denied promotion in favour of eighth-place Maesgwyn. The following season they won the North East Wales League title, as well as lifting the Premier Cup, their first trophies since the mid-1980s. However they were again denied promotion and folded as a result. They reformed and rejoined the league in 2019.

In 2020 the North East Wales Football League was formed and they were placed in the Championship Division, at the fifth tier of Welsh football.

During the 2023–24 season the club was renamed to Sychdyn United.

In 2025 Sychdyn beat third-tier Lex XI in the Welsh Cup second qualifying round. In the first round they were drawn away at Cymru North side Penrhyncoch and lost 2–0.

== Honours ==
- North East Wales League - Champions: 2016–17
- North East Wales League - Runners-up: 2015–16
- Clwyd League Division One - Champions: 1985–86
- NWCFA Junior Cup - Winners: 1985–86
- Clwyd Cup - Runners-up: 1985–86
