= C.P.D. Yr Wyddgrug =

Football club based in Flintshire

Yr Wyddgrug
- Full name: Clwb Pêl-Droed Yr Wyddgrug
- Founded: 2023
- League: North East Wales Division Two
- 2025–26: North East Wales Division Two, 5th of 8

Clwb Pêl-Droed Yr Wyddgrug is a Welsh football club based in Mold (Welsh: Yr Wyddgrug), Flintshire. The team plays in the North East Wales Division Two.

== History ==
The club was founded in 2023, aiming to promote the Welsh language. The club's first match was against FC Plas Madoc, which they lost 8–3.

The club competed in the 2023–24 Welsh Cup, losing 11–1 in the first qualifying round to Hawarden Rangers.

In the 2025–26 season they reached the final of the first ever NEWFA Trophy, but lost 3–0 to Aston Park Rangers.
