= Penyffordd F.C. =

Association football club in Wales

Penyffordd
- Full name: Penyffordd Football Club
- Nickname(s): Peny, Lions
- Founded: 2017
- Ground: Abbott’s Lane
- Coach: Stuart Tunnicliffe
- League: North East Wales Division One
- 2024–25: North East Wales Premier Division, 6th of 12

Penyffordd Football Club (Welsh: Clwb Pêl-droed Penyffordd) are a Welsh football club from Penyffordd, Flintshire, Wales. They play in the North East Wales Division One. Their senior men's team compete using the name Penyffordd Lions.

== History ==
The current club originated from the ashes of the old Penyffordd FC team, who competed in Welsh National League (Wrexham Area) Premier Division, and had won numerous cups during their history, but folded at the end of the 2015–16 season in July 2016.

Much of the base of the new team, which was called Penyffordd Lions, came from the local Sunday League team, the Red Lion Strollers. These players made the transition back to senior football to ensure the village had a senior football team again. The suffix of “Lions” was a reference to the Red Lions heritage.

The club's debut season of 2017–18 saw them finish as runners-up in the North East Wales League, and winning the North East Wales FA Junior (Horace Wynne) Cup as well as the Presidents Cup. They maintained their position within the North East Wales League, consistently being one of the stronger sides in the fifth-tier league, before achieving promotion to the fourth tier at the end of the 2021–22 season when they finished as runners-up in the North East Wales Football League Championship

The club announced at the start of the 2022–23 season that the Penyffordd Lions and the village's youth football club, the Penyffordd Juniors, had merged to create one club for the community, readopting the club name Penyffordd Football Club for the whole club system. The separate sections of the club kept the names of “Lions” and “Juniors” to differentiate. The season saw them perform well as a newly promoted club, finishing in third position in the North East Wales Football League Premier Division. The club also achieved a double-winning cup campaign for the 2023–24 season by winning both the NEWFL Premier League Cup and NEWFA Horace Wynne Cup, as well as again finishing third in the league.

== Honours ==
=== Penyffordd Lions ===
- North East Wales Football League Championship – Runners-up: 2021–22
- North East Wales League - Runners-up: 2017–18
- North East Wales FA Junior (Horace Wynne) Cup – Winners: 2017–18, 2023–24
- North East Wales Football League Premier League Cup – Winners: 2023–24
- North East Wales Football League Presidents Cup – Winners: 2017–18

=== Penyffordd ===
- Welsh National League (Wrexham Area) Division One – Champions: 2010–11
- Welsh National League (Wrexham Area) Division Two – Runners-up: 2005-06
- North East Wales FA Junior (Horace Wynne) Cup – Winners: 2006–07, 2009–10
