= Chirk Town F.C. =

Association football club in Wales

Chirk Town
- Full name: Chirk Town Football Club
- Founded: 2019
- Dissolved: 2022
- Manager: Chris Hughes
- League: North East Wales Football League Premier Division
- 2019–20: North East Wales League, 1st

Chirk Town Football Club were a football team based in Weston Rhyn, Shropshire. The team last played in the North East Wales Football League Premier Division in the 2021–22 season, which is at the fourth tier of the Welsh football league system.

== History ==
The club were formed in 2019 and joined the North East Wales League, which they won at their first attempt, edging out Brymbo Victoria on points-per-game in a season curtailed by the COVID-19 pandemic.

The club joined the newly formed North East Wales Football League in 2020 as a Premier Division club.

The club withdrew from the league late in the 2021–22 season and folded.

== Honours ==
- North East Wales League - Champions: 2019–20
- Graham Edwards Memorial Trophy - Winners: 2019
