= North East Wales Football League =

- Founded: 2020
- Country: Wales
- Other club from: England (1 team)
- Number of clubs: 32
- Level on pyramid: 4–6
- Promotion to: Ardal Leagues
- Current champions: FC Queens Park (2025–26)

The North East Wales Football League represents the North East Wales area at the fourth, fifth and sixth tiers of the Welsh football league system. It was established in 2020 as a successor to the North East Wales League following a reorganisation of the Welsh football pyramid. The league has three divisions:

- Division One at Tier 4, which offers a promotion route to the Tier 3 Ardal Leagues,
- Division Two at Tier 5, and
- Division Three at Tier 6

== History ==
The league was established in 2020. After the member clubs for the first season were announced, the list was amended before the season was due to commence due to clubs folding and moving divisions. The proposed inaugural season was abandoned due to the Coronavirus pandemic. It was eventually launched in July 2021 for the 2021–22 season with some changes to the list of participating teams.

Until 2025 the league had two divisions, the Premier Division and the Championship Division. In 2025 the league switched to three divisions, numbered Divisions One, Two and Three.

== Member clubs for 2026–27 season ==
=== North East Wales Football League Division One ===
Club	Location	Home ground
Acton	Acton	Spider Park
Aston Park Rangers	Aston	33 Pitch
Castell Alun Colts	Hope	Castell Alun Sports & Leisure Complex
Coedpoeth United	Coedpoeth	Penygelli Playing Fields
Greenfield	Greenfield	Bagillt Road
Hawarden Rangers	Hawarden	Gladstone Playing Fields
Lex XI	Stansty	Stansty Park
Penyffordd Lions	Penyffordd	Abbott's Lane
Rhostyllen	Rhostyllen	Vicarage Hill
Rhydymwyn	Rhydymwyn	Dolfechlas Road
Saltney Town	Saltney	Sandy Lane

=== North East Wales Football League Division Two ===
- AFC Deeside
- Brymbo
- Caerwys
- Cefn Druids
- Chirk AAA
- Holywell United
- Overton Recreation
- Ruabon Rovers
- Sychdyn United
- Yr Wyddgrug

=== North East Wales Football League Division Three ===
- AFC Weston Rhyn
- Bellevue
- Cei Connah
- Deeside Dragons
- Gronant
- Halkyn United
- Johnstown Youth
- Marchwiel Saints
- Mostyn
- Skippy
- Wrexham Foresters

== League Champions ==
Season	Premier Division	Championship
2020–21	Season void	Season void
2021–22	Greenfield	Connah's Quay Town
2022–23	FC Queens Park	Ruabon Rovers
2023–24	Corwen	FC Plas Madoc
2024–25	Mynydd Isa	Broughton United

Season	Division One	Division Two	Division Three
2025–26	FC Queens Park	Acton	Caerwys

== Cup Winners ==
Season	Premier Cup	Two Counties Cup	Mike Beech Memorial Trophy
2020–21	Season void	Season void	Season void
2021–22	Cefn Mawr Rangers	Connah's Quay Town	Connah's Quay Town
2022–23	Connah's Quay Town	Gronant	FC Queens Park
2023–24	Penyfford Lions	Acton	Mynydd Isa
2024–25	Mynydd Isa	Acton	Lex XI reserves
2025–26	FC Queens Park	Overton Recreation	

== Former clubs ==
The inaugural 2021–22 season saw a number of clubs resigning from the league structure. Premier Division club Brymbo Victoria left the league in August 2021 and dissolved and Chirk Town also resigned from the Premier Division late in the season and folded. In the Championship AFC Bagillt resigned in October 2021, Railway Rovers in March 2022 and Brymbo Lodge, both in March 2022 and Borras Park Albion in April.

Ahead of the 2022–23 season Cefn Mawr Rangers also resigned from the league. During that season, Saltney Ferry withdrew, and after the end of the season New Brighton Villa folded.

The 2024–25 season also saw a number a clubs leave the league - in the Premier Division both Caerwys and FC Plas Madoc left the league, and just before the end of the season, Deeside United also left the Championship. Gronant also announced they would depart from the league at the end of the season.

== See also ==
- Football in Wales
- Welsh football league system
