= NEWFA Junior Cup =

Association football tournament in Wales

- Region: Wales
- Current champions: FC Queens Park
- Most championships: FC Queens Park (5 wins)
- 2025–26

The North East Wales FA Junior Cup (known as the Horace Wynne Cup) is a football knockout tournament involving teams from in North Wales who play in leagues administered and associated with the North East Wales Football Association.

== Previous winners ==
Information sourced from NEWFA Handbook 2017.

=== 1970s ===
- 1971–72: – St Marys Ruabon
- 1972–73: – BICC
- 1973–74: – Buckley Rovers
- 1974–75: – Castell Alun Colts
- 1975–76: – Coedpoeth SC
- 1976–77: – Cefn Albion
- 1977–78: – Penley
- 1978–79: – Chirk AAA
- 1979–80: – Castell Alun Colts

=== 1980s ===
- 1980–81: – Tunnel Cement
- 1981–82: – Grapes
- 1982–83: – Penycae
- 1983–84: – Penycae
- 1984–85: – Penycae
- 1985–86: – Overton Athletic
- 1986–87: – Bradley SC
- 1987–88: – Bradley SC
- 1988–89: – Penley
- 1989–90: – New Broughton

=== 1990s ===
- 1990–91: – Penley
- 1991–92: – Saltney CC
- 1992–93: – Saltney CC
- 1993–94: – Rhosddu
- 1994–95: – Rhostyllen/ Bersham Royal British Legion
- 1995–96: – Llangollen Town
- 1996–97: – Bala Town
- 1997–98: – Bradley Villa
- 1998–99: – Borras Park Albion
- 1999–2000: – The Hand Chirk

=== 2000s ===
- 2000–01: – Cefn United
- 2001–02: – Mynydd Isa
- 2002–03: – Rhostyllen United
- 2003–04: – Summerhill United
- 2004–05: – Brynteg Village
- 2005–06: – Venture Community
- 2006–07: – Penyffordd
- 2007–08: – Penley
- 2008–09: – Garden Village
- 2009–10: – Penyffordd

=== 2010s ===
- 2010–11: – Saltney Town
- 2011–12: – Aston Park Rangers
- 2012–13: – Point of Ayr
- 2013–14: – FC Queens Park
- 2014–15: – Cefn Albion
- 2015–16: – Rhostyllen
- 2016–17: – Cefn Mawr Rangers
- 2017–18: – Penyffordd Lions
- 2018–19: – Flint Mountain
- 2019–20: – Competition not completed - Covid-19 pandemic

=== 2020s ===
- 2020–21: – No competition - Covid-19 pandemic
- 2021–22: – FC Queens Park
- 2022–23: – FC Queens Park
- 2023–24: – Penyffordd Lions
- 2024–25: – FC Queens Park
- 2025–26: – FC Queens Park

== Number of competition wins ==
- FC Queens Park – 5
- Penley – 4
- Penyffordd/ Penyffordd Lions – 4
- Penycae – 3
- Saltney CC/ Town – 3
- Bradley SC – 2
- Castell Alun Colts – 2
- Cefn Albion – 2
- Aston Park Rangers – 1
- Bala Town – 1
- BICC – 1
- Borras Park Albion – 1
- Bradley Villa – 1
- Buckley Rovers – 1
- Brynteg Village – 1
- Cefn Mawr Rangers – 1
- Cefn United – 1
- Chirk AAA – 1
- Coedpoeth SC – 1
- Flint Mountain – 1
- Garden Village – 1
- Grapes – 1
- Llangollen Town – 1
- Mynydd Isa – 1
- New Broughton – 1
- Overton Athletic – 1
- Point of Ayr – 1
- Rhosddu – 1
- Rhostyllen – 1
- Rhostyllen/ Bersham Royal British Legion – 1
- Rhostyllen United – 1
- St Marys Ruabon – 1
- Summerhill United – 1
- The Hand – 1
- Tunnel Cement – 1
- Venture – 1
