= Clwyd East Football League =

Welsh football league

North East Wales League
- Founded: 2011
- Folded: 2020
- Country: Wales
- Other club from: England (1 team)
- Number of clubs: 10
- Level on pyramid: 5
- Promotion to: Welsh National League (Wrexham Area)
- Last champions: Chirk Town (2019–20)

The North East Wales League represented the North East Wales area at the fifth tier of the Welsh football league system. It began life in 2011 as the Clwyd East League, and was renamed as the North East Wales League in 2015. It folded in 2020 due a reorganisation of football in the Welsh football pyramid. It was replaced by a new league at tiers 4 and 5 called the North East Wales Football League.

== History ==
Season	Winners	Runner up	Third
2011-12	FC Nomads of Connah's Quay	Point of Ayr	Aston Park Rangers
2012-13	Point of Ayr	Aston Park Rangers	Shotton Steel
2013-14	FC Queens Park	AFC Brynford	Aston Park Rangers
2014-15	Cefn Albion	Aston Park Rangers	Flint Mountain
2015-16	Rhostyllen	Sychdyn	Mold Town United
2016-17	Sychdyn	Mynydd Isa Spartans	Cefn Mawr Rangers
2017-18	Plas Madoc	Penyffordd Lions	Offa Athletic
2018-19	Flint Mountain	Acton	Mold Town United
2019-20	Chirk Town	Brymbo Victoria	Penyffordd Lions

== Member clubs for final 2019–20 season ==
=== Premier Division ===
- Acton
- Bellevue
- Borras Park Albion
- Bradley Park (resigned from the league in January 2020)
- Brymbo Victoria
- Caerwys
- Chirk Town
- Mold Town United
- Penyffordd Lions
- Sychdyn

== See also ==
- Football in Wales
- Welsh football league system
