= Cae-y-Castell =

Football stadium in Flintshire, Wales

Coordinates: 53°14′57″N 3°07′33″W

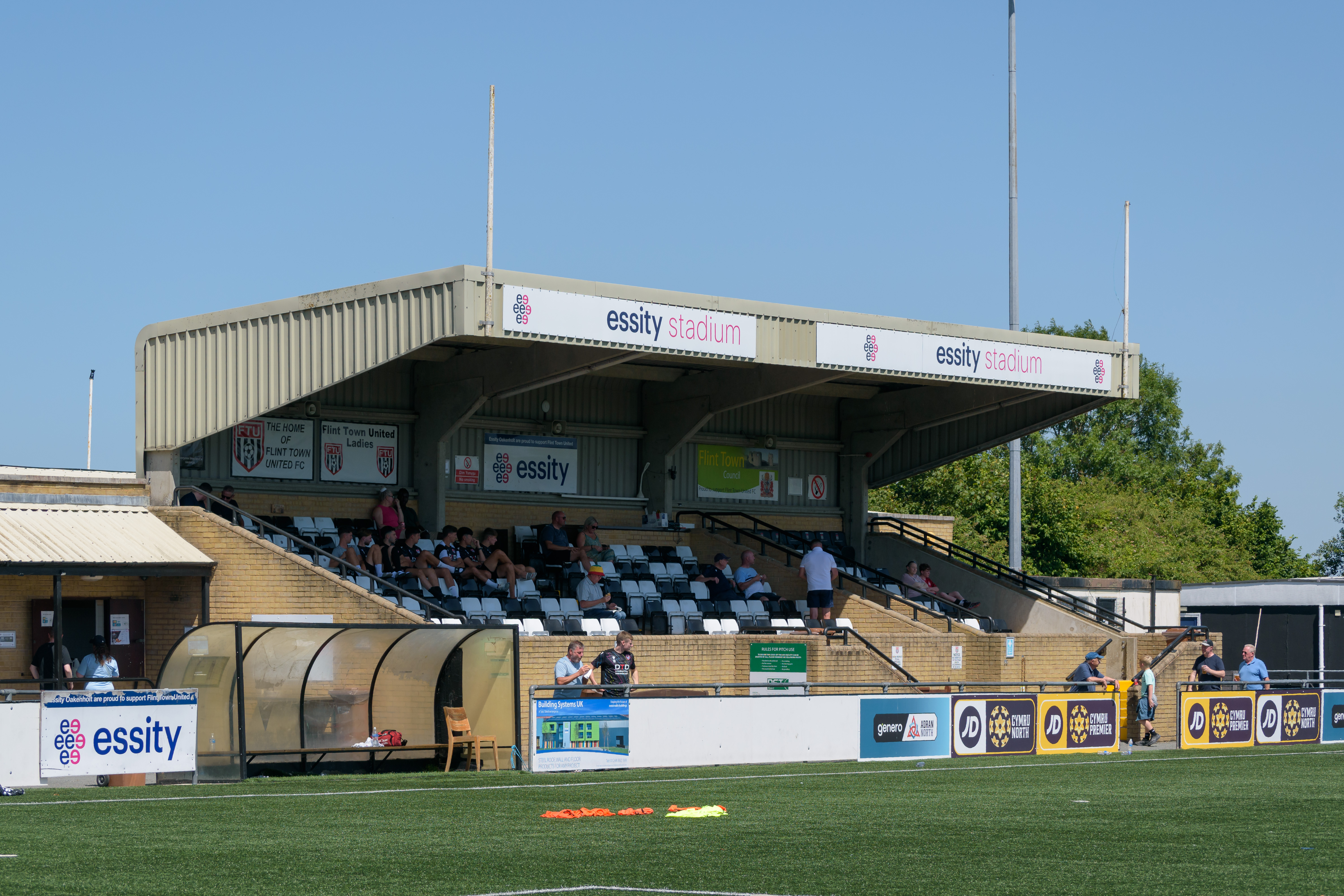
- Main Stand in 2025
- Interactive map of Cae-y-Castell
- Capacity: 3,000 (250 Seated)
- Surface: Artificial Turf

Construction
- Opened: 1993

Tenants
- Flint Town United F.C. FC Mountain (2022 - 2025) Connah's Quay Nomads FC (2023 - )

Cae-y-Castell (currently known as the Essity Stadium for sponsorship reasons) is a football stadium in Flint, Flintshire, Wales. Located on the banks of the Dee Estuary close to Flint Castle, it is the home ground of Flint Town United and is also used by Connah's Quay Nomads and Flint Rugby Club.

== History ==
The stadium was opened in 1993 after Flint moved from their previous Holywell Road ground.

In 2006–07, Connah's Quay Nomads were tenants at the ground.

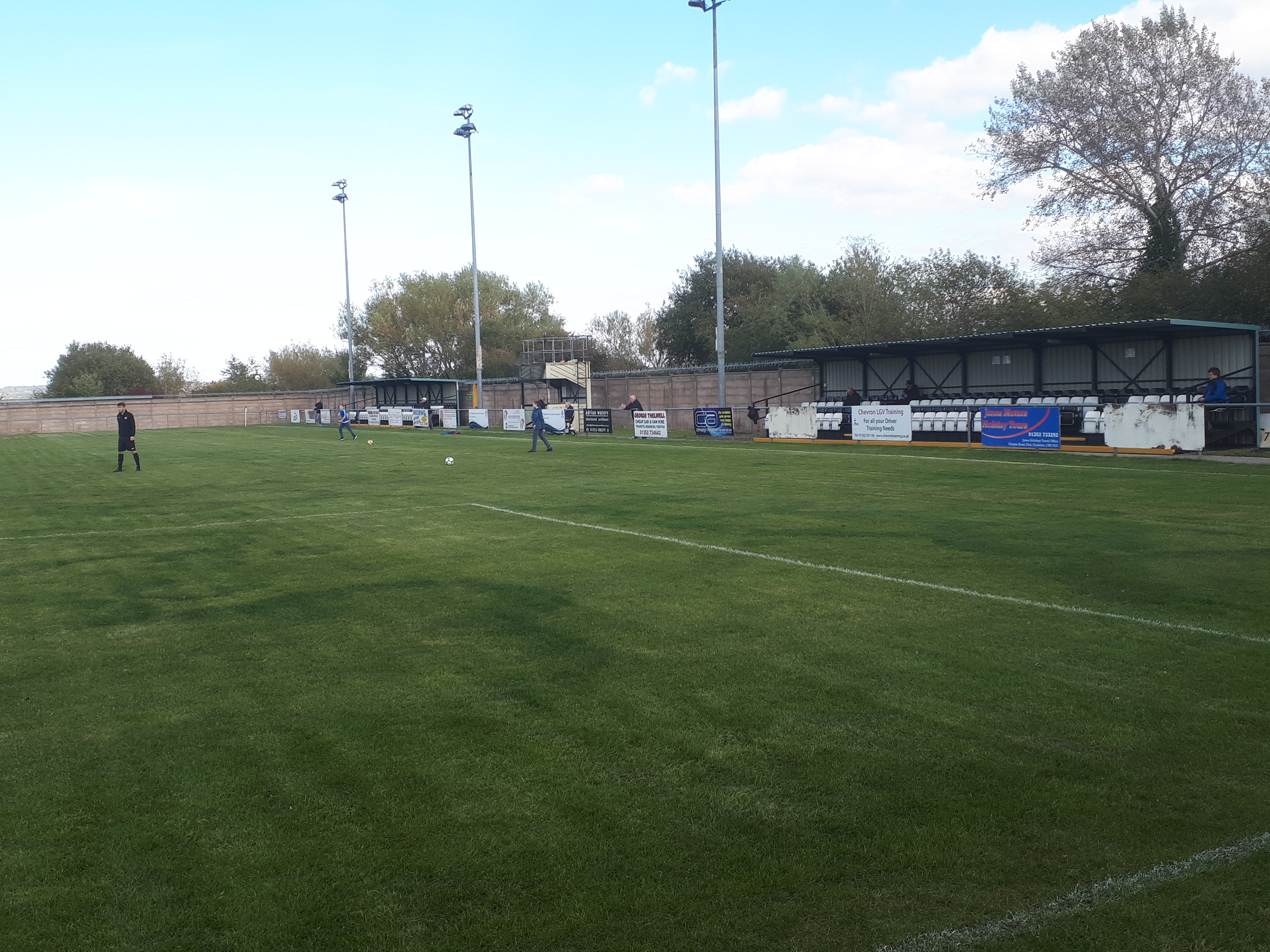
Smaller stands behind the goal at Cae-Y-Castell

In 2019, the stadium was renamed The Essity Stadium as part of a deal with the club's main sponsors.

In 2022, the club announced that an artificial pitch would be installed at the stadium. Later that year, Halkyn & Flint Mountain F.C. (now FC Mountain) announced they had agreed to use the ground. The new pitch was installed in September 2022.

In 2023, Connah's Quay Nomads announced they would be moving to Cae-y-Castell for the 2023-24 season.

== Proposed renovation ==
In 2019, Flint Town United and Connah's Quay Nomads began exploring a groundshare agreement which would see the stadium upgraded to UEFA Category 2, allowing it to host European qualifiers for both clubs as well as youth international fixtures.
