= FC Mountain =

Association football club in Wales

- Full name: FC Mountain
- Nickname: Mountain
- Founded: 2009
- Ground: Bastion Road, Prestatyn
- Capacity: 3,000 (250 Seated)
- Manager: vacant
- League: North Wales Coast East Premier Division
- 2025–26: Cymru North, 14th of 16 (relegated to Tier 4)

FC Mountain (formerly Flint Mountain F.C. and Halkyn & Flint Mountain F.C.) is a Welsh football team currently based in Prestatyn, Denbighshire. The team play in the North Wales Coast East Premier Division.

== History ==
The club was formed in 2009 as Flint Mountain FC and joined the Clwyd Football League. They played on a number of pitches in and around Flint before playing at Northop Hall Pavilion, home of Northop Hall Ladies team. In 2011 the league was split so they joined the new Clwyd East Football League. In 2015 this league was renamed to the North East Wales League. The 2018–19 season was one of great success for the club as they claimed the North East Wales League title and the North East Wales FA Horace Wynne Cup, as part of a quadruple-winning season. They moved into the Welsh National League (Wrexham Area) football system the following season as on the back of their promotion as champions.

Prior to the 2019–20 season commencing, Flint Mountain announced they would be moving once more, from the Northop Hall Pavilion to Halkyn United’s old pitch, Pant Newydd. As a result of the relocation, the team changed its name to Halkyn & Flint Mountain to acknowledge the move to Pentre Halkyn.

The club joined the newly formed North East Wales Football League in 2020 as a Premier Division club. In May 2022 they announced they would be moving ground to groundshare Cae-y-Castell, home of Flint Town United.

On 9 June 2022, it was announced that the club had been promoted to the tier 3 Ardal NW League for the 2022–23 season. The following day the team announced that after approval from the North East Wales Football Association, the club had reverted to its previous name of Flint Mountain Football Club with immediate effect.

In the 2023–24 season, Flint Mountain won the Ardal North West and NEWFA Challenge Cup, and reached the final of the Ardal North Cup. In June 2025, four new investors were announced as imminently to become involved and the club moved to another ground, as tenants at Bastion Road, home of Prestatyn Town.

After finishing 14th in the 2025–26 Cymru North, the club requested a volunary demotion from the league with the Football Association of Wales and as a result, were demoted to tier four for the 2026–27 season. The club also confirmed the same day they would be known going forward as FC Mountain. For the 2026–27 season they moved to the North Wales Coast East Football League Premier Division. In November 2026 they were banned from football due to non-payment of a fine. The club chairman, Jamie Welsh, stated that he hoped that the situation could be resolved within a week.

== Honours ==
- Ardal NW - Champions: 2023–24
- The Sovereign Trophies Auxiliary Cup - Winners: 2011–12
- North East Wales Premier Division – Runners-up: 2021–22
- North East Wales League - Champions: 2018–19
- North East Wales FA Challenge Cup – Winners: 2023–24
- North East Wales FA Junior (Horace Wynne) Cup – Winners: 2018–19
- North East Wales FA Junior (Horace Wynne) Cup – Runners-up: 2014–15
- Presidents Cup – Winners: 2018–19
- Presidents Cup – Runners-up: 2014–15
- Mike Beech Memorial Trophy – Winners: 2018–19
- Premier Cup – Runners-up: 2018–19
- North East Wales FA Reserve Cup – Winners: 2023–24 (reserves)
